= Roman Bravo-Young =

American wrestler (born 1999)

Personal information
- Full name: Roman Guillermo Bravo-Young
- Nickname: RBY
- Nationality: American
- Born: January 28, 1999 (age 27) Tucson, Arizona, U.S.

Sport
- Country: Mexico (2023–present); United States (2016–2023)
- Sport: Wrestling
- Weight class: 57 kg (126 lb)
- Events: Freestyle and Folkstyle
- College team: Penn State
- Club: Cowboy Wrestling Club RTC, Nittany Lion Wrestling Club (formerly)
- Coached by: David Taylor; Cael Sanderson
Medal record
Men's freestyle wrestling
Representing Mexico
World Championships
Silver medal – second place	2026 Astana	57 kg
Central American and Caribbean Games
Gold medal – first place	2026 Santo Domingo	57 kg
Pan American Championships
Gold medal – first place	2025 Monterrey	57 kg
Grand Prix
Gold medal – first place	2023 Mexico City	57 kg
Gold medal – first place	2024 Sangju	57 kg
Gold medal – first place	2024 Warsaw	57 kg
Gold medal – first place	2024 Nice	57 kg
Silver medal – second place	2025 Ulaanbaatar	57 kg
Bronze medal – third place	2025 Zagreb	57 kg
Silver medal – second place	2026 Zagreb	57 kg
Representing the United States
U20 Pan American Championships
Gold medal – first place	2019 Guatemala City	61 kg
Men's collegiate wrestling
Representing the Penn State Nittany Lions
NCAA Division I Championships
Gold medal – first place	2021 St. Louis	133 lb
Gold medal – first place	2022 Detroit	133 lb
Silver medal – second place	2023 Tulsa	133 lb
Big Ten Championships
Gold medal – first place	2021 State College	133 lb
Gold medal – first place	2022 Lincoln	133 lb
Gold medal – first place	2023 Ann Arbor	133 lb
Silver medal – second place	2020 Piscataway	133 lb

Roman Guillermo Bravo-Young (born January 28, 1999) is an American freestyle and graduated folkstyle wrestler who competes at 57 kilograms. In freestyle, he represented Mexico at the 2024 Summer Olympics, was the Pan American champion in 2025 and the Central American and Caribbean Games champion in 2026.

In folkstyle, Bravo-Young was the 2021 and 2022 NCAA Division I National champion at 133 pounds and a four-time All-American for the Pennsylvania State University.

== Career ==
=== High school ===
Roman was born and raised in Tucson, Arizona. Attended Sunnyside High School in Tucson, Arizona, where he was an undefeated four-time state champion with a 182–0 record. Also a US U17 World Team member in freestyle, Bravo-Young committed to the Pennsylvania State University.

=== Pennsylvania State University ===
==== 2018–2019 ====
Before the folkstyle season started, Bravo-Young placed second at the US U23 National championships in freestyle.

As a true freshman at 133 pounds, he earned a Keystone Classic title and placed third at the Southern Scuffle. After placing fifth at the Big Ten Championships, Bravo-Young became an All-American with an eighth-place finish at the NCAA National Championships, closing out the year with a 25–7 record.

Bravo-Young then placed second at the U20 US Open and grabbed a gold medal from the U20 Pan American Championships in freestyle.

==== 2019–2020 ====
As a sophomore, Bravo-Young won the Black Knight Invitational and Wilkes Open, and only lost one match during regular season to top-ranked Seth Gross. After improving to a second-place finish at the Big Ten Championships, the NCAA National Championships were canceled due to the COVID-19 pandemic, cutting his season short with a 20–2 record.

==== 2020–2021 ====
During the pandemic, Bravo-Young competed in freestyle, taking out NCAA finalist Jack Mueller at FloWrestling: Dake vs. Chamizo, Shelton Mack at the NLWC II, and eventual UFC champion Aljamain Sterling at the NLWC IV.

Going back to folkstyle, Bravo-Young had an undefeated regular season, and claimed his first Big Ten title with a win over rival Austin DeSanto from Iowa. At the NCAA Championships, Bravo-Young became a national champion with a hard-fought win in sudden-victory over NCAA finalist Daton Fix from Oklahoma State, after an undefeated tournament. He closed out the season with a 14–0 record and was named the Penn State Male Athlete of the Year.

==== 2021–2022 ====
After another undefeated regular season, Bravo-Young claimed his second Big Ten title with another win over Austin DeSanto. At the NCAA Championships, Bravo-Young became a two-time national champion with another win over Daton Fix, capping yet another perfect season with a 22–0 record.

==== 2022–2023 ====
In his extra season, granted to athletes due to the 2020 season being cut short, Bravo-Young once again went undefeated during regular season and claimed his third Big Ten title. At the NCAA Championships, he advanced to the finals, but was defeated by Vito Arujau from Cornell to claim runner-up honors, ending his season with a 20–1 record. Bravo-Young graduated as a two-time NCAA national champion, four-time All-American, and three-time Big Ten champion, with an overall record of 100–10.

In June, Bravo-Young competed in submission grappling against UFC veteran Alex Perez at the UFC Fight Pass Invitational 4, with the match ending in a draw.

=== Mexico ===
==== 2023 ====
In July, Bravo-Young announced he would transfer and represent Mexico in freestyle, his grandparents' native country. By the end of the month, Bravo-Young claimed the Mexican National Qualifier title, wearing the Mexican singlet for the first time.

In December, Bravo-Young claimed the Mexico Grand Prix title down at 57 kilograms, defeating all three opponents by technical fall.

==== 2024 ====
To start off January, Bravo-Young claimed a gold medal from the Grand Prix de France Henri Deglane, scoring wins over African champion Diamantino Iuna Fafé and US National Team member Daniel Deshazer.

In March, Bravo-Young competed at the Pan American Olympic Qualification Tournament, in an attempt to qualify Mexico for the Summer Olympics. After victories over Enrique Herrera and Pedro Mejías to make the semifinals, Bravo-Young was able to defeat Óscar Tigreros to become a 2024 Summer Olympian.

In June, Bravo-Young competed at the Poland Open, where he grabbed wins over African champions Gamal Mohamed and Diamantino Iuna Fafé on his way to a championship.

In August, Bravo-Young made his Olympic debut at the 2024 Summer Olympics, where after dropping his opening match to four-time European champion and two-time U23 World champion Arsen Harutyunyan from Armenia, he was eliminated from the tournament.

In November, Bravo-Young competed at the Korea Open, defeating his two Japanese opponents to claim the championship.

==== 2025 ====
To start off 2025, Bravo-Young competed at the prestigious Golden Grand Prix Ivan Yarygin in January, where he went 1–1. Next, he claimed a bronze medal at the Grand Prix Zagreb Open, earning three victories over international competition and a loss to three-time NCAA champion and Olympic finalist Spencer Lee in a highly anticipated contest.

In May, after three victories over foreign opposition, Bravo-Young claimed the gold medal at the Pan American Championships. He gave Mexico its first gold medal performance in 32 years at the tournament.

Bravo-Young competed at the Ulaanbaatar Open in June, in Mongolia. After a win over Turkey, he pinned India's Olympic bronze medalist Aman Sehrawat in the semifinals before suffering a loss to Mongolia.

Bravo-Young finished out the season in September at the World Championships, where he beat Germany and Iran before falling to eventual champion from North Korea Han Chong-song in the quarterfinals. After recovering with a win over Puerto Rico's Darian Cruz in repechage, he fell in the bronze-medal bout to Arsen Harutyunyan from Armenia, in a rematch from the 2024 Summer Olympics and the 2016 U17 World Championships.

==== 2026 ====
Bravo-Young stepped on the mat once again at the Zagreb Open in February, defeating notable representatives of India, the United States and Iran to reach the finals, where he suffered an ankle injury early in the match after getting scored on by Spencer Lee's offense, which forced him to withdraw with a silver medal.

After several months off the mat, Bravo-Young gave Mexico a gold medal performance at the Central American and Caribbean Games, taking out the representatives from Colombia, Cuba, the Dominican Republic, Venezuela and Puerto Rico on his way to the top of the podium.

In November, after three victories over opponents. Bravo-Young faced Spencer Lee in the finals at the 2026 World Wrestling Championship, where he fell to the American by a score of 10-0 earning him a silver medal. This accomplishments resulted in Bravo Young becoming the first Mexican wrestler to reach the Senior World Championship finals along with being the first Mexican wrestler to medal at the Senior World Championship

== Wrestling style ==
Bravo-Young is known for his footwork, speed, and agility. Defensively, he is known for employing acrobatic flips to get out of dangerous situations. Bravo-Young sometimes trains with former UFC champion Dominick Cruz, who has some of the most versatile footwork in mixed martial arts.

== Personal life ==
Bravo-Young was engaged to soccer player Ellie Bravo-Young (née Wheeler) at CPKC Stadium on March 15, 2025. He proposed to her on the field after her game with the Kansas City Current. The couple married in Tucson, Arizona, on December 27, 2025.

== Freestyle record ==
Senior Freestyle Matches
Res.	Record	Opponent	Score	Date	Event	Location
2026 Central American and Caribbean Games (gold) at 57 kg
Win	44–9	(Puerto Rico) Darian Cruz	TF 11–0	July 30–31, 2026	2026 Central American and Caribbean Games	Santo Domingo, Dominican Republic
Win	43–9	(Dominican Republic) Maximilian Leete	TF 10–0	July 30–31, 2026	2026 Central American and Caribbean Games	Santo Domingo, Dominican Republic
Win	42–9	(Cuba) Vladimir Vila	TF 11–1	July 30–31, 2026	2026 Central American and Caribbean Games	Santo Domingo, Dominican Republic
Win	41–9	(Venezuela) Pedro Mejías	TF 10–0	July 30–31, 2026	2026 Central American and Caribbean Games	Santo Domingo, Dominican Republic
Win	40–9	(Colombia) Duvan Garcia	TF 10–0	July 30–31, 2026	2026 Central American and Caribbean Games	Santo Domingo, Dominican Republic
2026 Grand Prix Zagreb Open (silver) at 57 kg
Loss	39–9	(United States) Spencer Lee	VIN (0–4)	February 4, 2026	2026 Grand Prix Zagreb Open	Zagreb, Croatia
Win	39–8	(Iran) Milad Valizadeh	TF 10–0	February 4, 2026	2026 Grand Prix Zagreb Open	Zagreb, Croatia
Win	38–8	(United States) Anthony Knox	TF 12–2	February 4, 2026	2026 Grand Prix Zagreb Open	Zagreb, Croatia
Win	37–8	(India) Atish Todkar	TF 10–0	February 4, 2026	2026 Grand Prix Zagreb Open	Zagreb, Croatia
2025 World Championships 5th at 57 kg
Loss	36–8	(Armenia) Arsen Harutyunyan	4–7	September 14–15, 2025	2025 World Championships	Zagreb, Croatia
Win	36–8	(Puerto Rico) Darian Cruz	6–2	September 14–15, 2025	2025 World Championships	Zagreb, Croatia
Loss	35–9	(North Korea) Han Chong-song	3–4	September 14–15, 2025	2025 World Championships	Zagreb, Croatia
Win	35–8	(Iran) Ali Momeni	Fall	September 14–15, 2025	2025 World Championships	Zagreb, Croatia
Win	34–8	(Germany) Niklas Stechele	TF 10–0	September 14–15, 2025	2025 World Championships	Zagreb, Croatia
2025 Ulaanbaatar Open (silver) at 57 kg
Loss	33–8	(Mongolia) Batkhuyagiin Mönkh-Erdene	3–6	June 1, 2025	2025 Ulaanbaatar Open	Ulaanbaatar, Mongolia
Win	33–7	(India) Aman Sehrawat	Fall	June 1, 2025	2025 Ulaanbaatar Open	Ulaanbaatar, Mongolia
Win	32–7	(Turkey) Bekir Keser	TF 12–2	June 1, 2025	2025 Ulaanbaatar Open	Ulaanbaatar, Mongolia
2025 Pan American Championships (gold) at 57 kg
Win	31–7	(Puerto Rico) Lucas Rodriguez	TF 12–0	May 11, 2025	2025 Pan American Championships	Monterrey, Mexico
Win	30–7	(Venezuela) Pedro Mejias	4–0	May 11, 2025	2025 Pan American Championships	Monterrey, Mexico
Win	29–7	(United States) Liam Cronin	TF 10–0	May 11, 2025	2025 Pan American Championships	Monterrey, Mexico
2025 Grand Prix Zagreb Open (bronze) at 57 kg
Win	28–7	(Georgia (country)) Luka Gvinjilia	11–2	February 5, 2025	2025 Grand Prix Zagreb Open	Zagreb, Croatia
Loss	27–7	(United States) Spencer Lee	3–6	February 5, 2025	2025 Grand Prix Zagreb Open	Zagreb, Croatia
Win	27–6	(United States) Daniel Deshazer	6–2	February 5, 2025	2025 Grand Prix Zagreb Open	Zagreb, Croatia
Win	26–6	(Ukraine) Kamil Kerymov	9–6	February 5, 2025	2025 Grand Prix Zagreb Open	Zagreb, Croatia
2025 Ivan Yarygin Golden Grand Prix DNP at 57 kg
Loss	25–6	(Russia) Akhmed Khamidov	5–7	January 22, 2025	2025 Golden Grand Prix Ivan Yarygin	Krasnoyarsk, Russia
Win	25–5	(Russia) Ayanday Ondar	4–1	January 22, 2025	2025 Golden Grand Prix Ivan Yarygin	Krasnoyarsk, Russia
2024 Korea Open (gold) at 57 kg
Win	24–5	(Japan) Fuga Sasaki	8–2	November 23, 2024	2024 Korea Open	(South Korea) Sangju, Korea
Win	23–5	(Japan) Ban Sawatani	Fall	November 23, 2024	2024 Korea Open	(South Korea) Sangju, Korea
2024 Summer Olympics 12th at 57 kg
Loss	22–5	(Armenia) Arsen Harutyunyan	TF 3–13	August 8, 2024	2024 Summer Olympics	Paris, France
2024 Poland Open (gold) at 57 kg
Win	22–4	(Guinea-Bissau) Diamantino Iuna Fafé	TF 13–2	June 23, 2024	2024 Poland Open	Warsaw, Poland
Win	21–4	(Egypt) Gamal Mohamed	Fall	June 23, 2024	2024 Poland Open	Warsaw, Poland
2024 Pan American Olympic Qualification Tournament (gold) at 57 kg
Win	20–4	(Colombia) Óscar Tigreros	TF 14–4	March 1, 2024	2024 Pan American Olympic Qualification Tournament	Acapulco, Mexico
Win	19–4	(Venezuela) Pedro Mejías	10–6	March 1, 2024	2024 Pan American Olympic Qualification Tournament	Acapulco, Mexico
Win	18–4	(Peru) Enrique Herrera	TF 11–0	March 1, 2024	2024 Pan American Olympic Qualification Tournament	Acapulco, Mexico
2024 Henri Deglane Grand Prix (gold) at 57 kg
Win	17–4	(United States) Daniel Deshazer	2–1	January 20, 2024	Grand Prix de France Henri Deglane 2024	Nice, France
Win	16–4	(Guinea-Bissau) Diamantino Iuna Fafé	Fall	January 20, 2024	Grand Prix de France Henri Deglane 2024	Nice, France
Win	15–4	(United States) Kael Lauridsen	TF 14–4	January 20, 2024	Grand Prix de France Henri Deglane 2024	Nice, France
Win	14–4	(Morocco) Ben Hachem Tarik	TF 10–0	January 20, 2024	Grand Prix de France Henri Deglane 2024	Nice, France
2023 Mexico Grand Prix (gold) at 57 kg
Win	13–4	(Mexico) M García	TF 10–0	December 2, 2023	2023 Mexico Grand Prix	Mexico City, Mexico
Win	12–4	(Mexico) Jorge Olvera	TF 12–0	December 2, 2023	2023 Mexico Grand Prix	Mexico City, Mexico
Win	11–4	(Mexico) Pedro Flores Salazar	TF 10–0	December 2, 2023	2023 Mexico Grand Prix	Mexico City, Mexico
2023 MEX National Qualifier (gold) at 61 kg
Win	10–4	(Mexico) Jorge Olvera	TF 10–0	July 29, 2023	2023 4th Mexican National Qualifier	Oaxtepec, Mexico
Win	9–4	(Mexico) Hugo Calderón	TF 10–0	July 29, 2023	2023 4th Mexican National Qualifier	Oaxtepec, Mexico
Win	8–4	(Jamaica) Aljamain Sterling	6–4	December 22, 2020	NLWC IV	(United States) State College, Pennsylvania
Win	7–4	(United States) Shelton Mack	TF 11–0	October 20, 2020	NLWC II	(United States) State College, Pennsylvania
Win	6–4	(United States) Jack Mueller	8–1	July 25, 2020	FloWrestling: Dake vs. Chamizo	(United States) Austin, Texas
2018 US U23 Nationals (silver) at 61 kg
Loss	5–4	(United States) Vitali Arujau	TF 0–10	June 1–3, 2018	2018 US U23 National Championships	(United States) Akron, Ohio
Loss	5–3	(United States) Vitali Arujau	TF 4–15	June 1–3, 2018	2018 US U23 National Championships	(United States) Akron, Ohio
Win	5–2	(United States) Charles Tucker	4–2	June 1–3, 2018	2018 US U23 National Championships	(United States) Akron, Ohio
Win	4–2	(United States) Sean Fausz	TF 11–0	June 1–3, 2018	2018 US U23 National Championships	(United States) Akron, Ohio
Win	3–2	(United States) Larry Henderson	TF 12–2	June 1–3, 2018	2018 US U23 National Championships	(United States) Akron, Ohio
Win	2–2	(United States) Mikel Perales	TF 13–2	June 1–3, 2018	2018 US U23 National Championships	(United States) Akron, Ohio
Win	1–2	(United States) Drew West	TF 12–2	June 1–3, 2018	2018 US U23 National Championships	(United States) Akron, Ohio
2017 US Open DNP at 57 kg
Loss	0–2	(United States) Jarrod Patterson	5–12	April 26–29, 2017	2017 US Open National Championships	(United States) Las Vegas, Nevada
Loss	0–1	(United States) Tony Ramos	TF 2–12	April 26–29, 2017	2017 US Open National Championships	(United States) Las Vegas, Nevada

== NCAA record ==
NCAA Division I Record
Res.	Record	Opponent	Score	Date	Event
End of 2022–2023 Season (senior year+)
2023 NCAA Championships (silver) at 133 lbs
Loss	100–10	Vito Arujau	4–10	March 16–18, 2023	2023 NCAA Division I Wrestling Championships
Win	100–9	Michael McGee	SV–1 6–4	March 16–18, 2023	2023 NCAA Division I Wrestling Championships
Win	99–9	Aaron Nagao	4–1	March 16–18, 2023	2023 NCAA Division I Wrestling Championships
Win	98–9	Brayden Palmer	5–2	March 16–18, 2023	2023 NCAA Division I Wrestling Championships
Win	97–9	Ethan Oakley	MD 12–3	March 16–18, 2023	2023 NCAA Division I Wrestling Championships
2023 Big Ten Conference (gold) at 133 lbs
Win	96–9	Aaron Nagao	5–2	March 9–10, 2023	2023 Big Ten Conference Championships
Win	95-9	Dylan Ragusin	8–2	March 9–10, 2023	2023 Big Ten Conference Championships
Win	94-9	Brody Teske	MD 13–2	March 9–10, 2023	2023 Big Ten Conference Championships
Win	93–9	Mason Prinkey	Fall	February 19, 2023	Clarion - Penn State Dual
Win	92–9	King Sandoval	TF 29–13	February 12, 2023	Penn State - Maryland Dual
Win	91–9	Jesse Mendez	8–2	February 3, 2023	Penn State - Ohio State Dual
Win	90–9	Brody Teske	Fall	January 27, 2023	Iowa - Penn State Dual
Win	89–9	Rayvon Foley	Fall	January 22, 2023	Michigan State - Penn State Dual
Win	88–9	Dylan Ragusin	4–2	January 20, 2023	Michigan - Penn State Dual
Win	87–9	Taylor LaMont	MD 14–5	January 6, 2023	Penn State - Wisconsin Dual
Win	86–9	Ramazan Attasauov	MD 10–2	December 20, 2022	Iowa State - Penn State Dual
Win	85–9	Jace Palmer	TF 26–11	December 19, 2022	Penn State - North Carolina Dual
Win	84–9	Vince Perez	Fall	December 19, 2022	Central Michigan - Penn State Dual
Win	83–9	Gabe Whisenhunt	MD 17–8	December 11, 2022	Oregon State - Penn State Dual
Win	82–9	Richie Koehler	MD 23–9	December 2, 2022	Penn State - Rider Dual
Win	81–9	Gable Strickland	TF 23–8	November 11, 2022	Lock Haven - Penn State Dual
Start of 2022–2023 Season (senior year+)
End of 2021–2022 Season (senior year)
2022 NCAA Championships (gold) at 133 lbs
Win	80–9	Daton Fix	3–2	March 17–19, 2022	2022 NCAA Division I Wrestling Championships
Win	79–9	Austin DeSanto	3–2	March 17–19, 2022	2022 NCAA Division I Wrestling Championships
Win	78–9	Brian Courtney	13–6	March 17–19, 2022	2022 NCAA Division I Wrestling Championships
Win	77–9	Josh Koderhandt	Fall	March 17–19, 2022	2022 NCAA Division I Wrestling Championships
Win	76–9	Dominic LaJoie	MD 16–4	March 17–19, 2022	2022 NCAA Division I Wrestling Championships
2022 Big Ten Conference (gold) at 133 lbs
Win	75–9	Austin DeSanto	3–1	March 5–6, 2022	2022 Big Ten Conference Championships
Win	74-9	Dylan Ragusin	4–0	March 5–6, 2022	2022 Big Ten Conference Championships
Win	73-9	Matt Ramos	MD 11–3	March 5–6, 2022	2022 Big Ten Conference Championships
Win	72–9	Richie Koehler	TF 26–11	February 20, 2022	Rider - Penn State Dual
Win	71–9	Dominick Serrano	TF 23–8	February 6, 2022	Nebraska - Penn State Dual
Win	70–9	Brady Koontz	Fall	February 4, 2022	Ohio State - Penn State Dual
Win	69–9	Austin DeSanto	3–2	January 28, 2022	Penn State - Iowa Dual
Win	68–9	Dylan Ragusin	8–1	January 21, 2022	Penn State - Michigan Dual
Win	67–9	Joey Olivieri	11–5	January 16, 2022	Rutgers - Penn State Dual
Win	66–9	King Sandoval	TF 17–1	January 7, 2022	Penn State - Maryland Dual
Win	65–9	Michael McGee	6–2	December 21, 2021	Penn State - Arizona State Dual
Win	64–9	Dominic LaJoie	MD 21–9	December 20, 2021	Cornell - Penn State Dual
Win	63–9	Kyle Biscoglia	Fall	December 20, 2021	Northern Iowa - Penn State Dual
Win	62–9	Sheldon Seymour	MD 19–7	December 5, 2021	Lehigh - Penn State Dual
Win	61–9	Dominice Carone	TF 26–11	November 18, 2021	Army - Penn State Dual
Win	60–9	Anthony Petrillo	Fall	November 13, 2021	Sacred Heart - Penn State Dual
Win	59–9	Jason Shaner Jr.	8–3	November 13, 2021	Oregon State - Penn State Dual
Start of 2021–2022 Season (senior year)
End of 2020–2021 Season (junior year)
2021 NCAA Championships (gold) at 133 lbs
Win	58–9	Daton Fix	SV 4–2	March 18–20, 2021	2021 NCAA Division I Wrestling Championships
Win	57–9	Korbin Myers	5–3	March 18–20, 2021	2021 NCAA Division I Wrestling Championships
Win	56–9	Louie Hayes	4–1	March 18–20, 2021	2021 NCAA Division I Wrestling Championships
Win	55–9	Kyle Burwick	MD 11–3	March 18–20, 2021	2021 NCAA Division I Wrestling Championships
Win	54–9	Sean Carter	TF 20–5	March 18–20, 2021	2021 NCAA Division I Wrestling Championships
2021 Big Ten Conference (gold) at 133 lbs
Win	53–9	Austin DeSanto	5–2	March 6–7, 2021	2021 Big Ten Conference Championships
Win	52-9	Chris Cannon	8–3	March 6–7, 2021	2021 Big Ten Conference Championships
Win	51-9	Jacob Rundell	9–3	March 6–7, 2021	2021 Big Ten Conference Championships
Win	50–9	Jackson Cockrell	MD 24–13	February 21, 2021	Maryland - Penn State Dual
Win	49–9	Jordan Decatur	TF 27–8	February 19, 2021	Penn State - Ohio State Dual
Win	48–9	Dylan Ragusin	9–2	February 14, 2021	Penn State - Michigan Dual
Win	47–9	Kyle Burwick	11–6	February 2, 2021	Penn State - Wisconsin Dual
Win	46–9	Dylan Utterback	Fall	January 30, 2021	Penn State - Northwestern Dual
Win	45–9	Kyle Luigs	11–8	January 30, 2021	Penn State - Indiana Dual
Start of 2020-2021 Season (junior year)
End of 2019-2020 Season (sophomore year)
2020 Big Ten Conference (silver) at 133 lbs
Loss	44–9	Sebastian Rivera	2-7	March 8, 2020	2020 Big Ten Championships
Win	44–8	Austin DeSanto	3-2	March 8, 2020	2020 Big Ten Championships
Win	43–8	Sammy Alvarez	5-2	March 8, 2020	2020 Big Ten Championships
Win	42–8	Josh Vega	Fall	February 23, 2020	American - Penn State Dual
Win	41–8	Jordan Decatur	10-4	February 15, 2020	Ohio State - Penn State Dual
Win	40–8	Boo Dryden	TF 23–8	February 9, 2020	Penn State - Minnesota Dual
Loss	39–8	Seth Gross	5-6	February 7, 2020	Penn State - Wisconsin Dual
Win	39–7	King Sandoval	TF 24–9	February 2, 2020	Maryland - Penn State Dual
Win	38–7	Austin DeSanto	Injury	January 31, 2020	Penn State - Iowa Dual
Win	37–7	Ridge Lovett	MD 11–3	January 24, 2020	Penn State - Nebraska Dual
Win	36–7	Sammy Alvarez	SV-2 4–2	January 19, 2020	Rutgers - Penn State Dual
Win	35–7	Dylan Utterback	TF 23–8	January 12, 2020	Northwestern - Penn State Dual
2019 Wilken Open (gold) at 133 lbs
Win	34–7	Jaret Lane	9-3	December 22, 2019	2019 Wilken Open
Win	33–7	Brandon Loperfido	MD 14–5	December 22, 2019	2019 Wilken Open
Win	32–7	Justin Mastroianni	TF 23–7	December 22, 2019	2019 Wilken Open
Win	31–7	Carmen Ferrante	MD 21–9	December 8, 2019	Pennsylvania - Penn State Dual
Win	30–7	Jaret Lane	7-2	December 6, 2019	Penn State - Lehigh Dual
Win	29–7	Josh Kramer	7-6	November 22, 2019	Penn State - Arizona State Dual
2019 Black Knight Invite (gold) at 133 lbs
Win	28–7	Austin Assad	MD 17–9	November 17, 2019	2019 Black Knight Invitational
Win	27–7	Andrew Wert	9-4	November 17, 2019	2019 Black Knight Invitational
Win	26–7	Shawn Orem	MD 20–9	November 17, 2019	2019 Black Knight Invitational
Win	25–7	Casey Cobb	MD 17–6	November 10, 2019	Navy - Penn State Dual
Start of 2019-2020 Season (sophomore year)
End of 2018-2019 Season (freshman year)
2019 NCAA Championships 8th at 133 lbs
Loss	24–7	Ethan Lizak	5-8	March 22, 2019	2019 NCAA Division I Wrestling Championships
Loss	24–6	John Erneste	MD 0–10	March 22, 2019	2019 NCAA Division I Wrestling Championships
Win	24–5	Micky Phillippi	4-3	March 22, 2019	2019 NCAA Division I Wrestling Championships
Win	23–5	Ben Thornton	3-1	March 22, 2019	2019 NCAA Division I Wrestling Championships
Win	22–5	Charles Tucker	6-2	March 22, 2019	2019 NCAA Division I Wrestling Championships
Loss	21–5	Austin DeSanto	2-7	March 22, 2019	2019 NCAA Division I Wrestling Championships
Win	21–4	Mario Guillen	8-2	March 22, 2019	2019 NCAA Division I Wrestling Championships
2019 Big Ten Conference 5th at 133 lbs
Win	20–4	Stevan Mićić	MFOR	March 10, 2019	2019 Big Ten Championships
Loss	19–4	Austin DeSanto	8-13	March 10, 2019	2019 Big Ten Championships
Win	19–3	Dylan Duncan	3-2	March 10, 2019	2019 Big Ten Championships
Win	18–3	Jens Lantz	MD 14–5	March 10, 2019	2019 Big Ten Championships
Loss	17–3	Luke Pletcher	5-8	March 10, 2019	2019 Big Ten Championships
Win	17–2	Jevon Parrish	MD 17–5	March 10, 2019	2019 Big Ten Championships
Win	16–2	Derek Spann	MD 14–5	February 24, 2019	Buffalo - Penn State Dual
Win	15–2	Luke Pletcher	TB-2 2–1	February 8, 2019	Penn State - Ohio State Dual
Loss	14–2	Ben Thornton	3-7	January 25, 2019	Penn State - Purdue Dual
Win	14–1	Jevon Parrish	MD 20–7	January 20, 2019	Nebraska - Penn State Dual
Win	13–1	Jens Lantz	MD 12–4	January 13, 2019	Wisconsin - Penn State Dual
Win	12–1	Colin Valdiviez	15-9	January 11, 2019	Penn State - Northwestern Dual
2019 Southern Scuffle (bronze) at 133 lbs
Win	11–1	Sean Nickell	MD 10–1	January 2, 2019	2019 Southern Scuffle
Win	10–1	Mason Pengilly	11-4	January 2, 2019	2019 Southern Scuffle
Loss	9–1	Austin Gomez	Fall	January 2, 2019	2019 Southern Scuffle
Win	9–0	Collin Gerardi	8-6	January 2, 2019	2019 Southern Scuffle
Win	8–0	Nick Farro	4-1	January 2, 2019	2019 Southern Scuffle
Win	7–0	Dalton Young	4-3	January 2, 2019	2019 Southern Scuffle
Win	6–0	Ryan Millhof	MD 14–1	December 14, 2018	Arizona State - Penn State Dual
Win	5–0	Brandon Paetzell	MD 13–5	December 2, 2018	Lehigh - Penn State Dual
Win	4–0	David Campbell	MD 21–7	November 30, 2018	Penn State - Bucknell Dual
2018 Keystone Classic (gold) at 133 lbs
Win	3–0	Chandler Olson	TF 24–9	November 18, 2018	2018 Keystone Classic
Win		Lukus Stricker	INJ	November 18, 2018	2018 Keystone Classic
Win	2–0	Jon Guevara	Fall	November 18, 2018	2018 Keystone Classic
Win	1–0	Tim Rooney	Fall	November 11, 2018	Kent State - Penn State Dual
Start of 2018-2019 Season (freshman year)

=== Stats ===
Season	Year	School	NCAA	Weight Class	Record	Win
2023	Senior+	Pennsylvania State University	2nd	133	20–1	95.24%
2022	Senior	Pennsylvania State University	1st	133	22–0	100.00%
2021	Junior	Pennsylvania State University	1st	133	14–0	100.00%
2020	Sophomore	Pennsylvania State University	N/A	133	20–2	90.91%
2019	Freshman	Pennsylvania State University	8th	133	24–7	77.42%
Career					100–10	90.91%

== Submission grappling record ==
1 Match, 0 Wins, 0 Losses, 1 Draw
Result	Rec.	Opponent	Method	Event	Division	Type	Year	Location
Draw	0–0–1	(United States) Alex Perez	Draw (time limit)	UFC Fight Pass Invitational 4	145 lbs	Nogi	June 29, 2023	(United States) Las Vegas, Nevada
