= 2026 World Wrestling Championships – Men's freestyle 57 kg =

Wrestling competitions

Men's freestyle 57 kg at the 2026 World Championships
- Venue: Barys Arena
- Dates: 31 October – 1 November 2026
- Competitors: 34 from 34 nations

Medalists
| gold medal | Spencer Lee | United States |
| silver medal | Roman Bravo-Young | Mexico |
| bronze medal | Han Chong-song | North Korea |
| bronze medal | Abubakar Mutaliev | Russia |

The men's freestyle 57 kilograms is a competition featured at the 2026 World Wrestling Championships, and was held in Astana, Kazakhstan on 31 October and 1 November 2026.

This freestyle wrestling competition consists of a single-elimination tournament, with a repechage used to determine the winner of two bronze medals. The two finalists face off for gold and silver medals. Each wrestler who loses to one of the two finalists moves into the repechage, culminating in a pair of bronze medal matches, featuring the semifinal losers each facing the remaining repechage opponent from their half of the bracket.

== Results ==
Legend

- F — Won by fall
- WO — Won by walkover

=== Finals ===
| Semifinals | | Final |
| Han Chong-song (PRK) | 1 |
| Roman Bravo-Young (MEX) | 4 | Roman Bravo-Young (MEX) | 0 |
| Islam Bazarganov (AZE) | 10 | Spencer Lee (USA) | 10 |
| Spencer Lee (USA) | 5^{F} |

=== Top half ===
==== Section 1 ====
Round of 64
Andrei Vitan (MDA) | 6
Abdymalik Karachov (KGZ) | 11

Round of 32
Han Chong-song (PRK) | 10^{F}
Muhammet Karavuş (TUR) | 2
Isaac Wong (HKG) | 0
Azamat Tuskaev (SRB) | 10
Abdymalik Karachov (KGZ) | 4
Diamantino Iuna Fafé (GBS) | 0
Mouadh Chibani (ALG) | 0
Aryan Tsiutryn (BLR) | 10

Round of 16
Han Chong-song (PRK) | 8
Azamat Tuskaev (SRB) | 1
Abdymalik Karachov (KGZ) | 3
Aryan Tsiutryn (BLR) | 5

Quarterfinals
Han Chong-song (PRK) | 7
Aryan Tsiutryn (BLR) | 3

==== Section 2 ====
Round of 64

Round of 32
Roberti Dingashvili (GEO) | 0
Batkhuyagiin Mönkh-Erdene (MGL) | 5
Timothy Levine (CAN) | 2
Pedro Mejías (VEN) | 9
John Leopold (MRI) | WO
Asadbek Saidturaev (UZB)
Meirambek Kartbay (KAZ) | 2
Roman Bravo-Young (MEX) | 5

Round of 16
Batkhuyagiin Mönkh-Erdene (MGL) | 7
Pedro Mejías (VEN) | 2
John Leopold (MRI) | 0
Roman Bravo-Young (MEX) | 10

Quarterfinals
Batkhuyagiin Mönkh-Erdene (MGL) | 3
Roman Bravo-Young (MEX) | 4

=== Bottom half ===
==== Section 3 ====
Round of 64

Round of 32
Islam Bazarganov (AZE) | 10
Rahul Deswal (IND) | 0
Thomas Epp (SUI) | 21
Makaya Katendi (ANG) | 14
Yamato Ogawa (JPN) | 3
Aiaal Belolyubskii (TJK) | 1
Niklas Stechele (GER) | 3
Darian Cruz (PUR) | 1

Round of 16
Islam Bazarganov (AZE) | 11
Thomas Epp (SUI) | 0
Yamato Ogawa (JPN) | 4
Niklas Stechele (GER) | 0

Quarterfinals
Islam Bazarganov (AZE) | 12
Yamato Ogawa (JPN) | 2

==== Section 4 ====
Round of 64
Yun Min-hyeok (KOR) | 13
Xie Qingkan (CHN) | 8

Round of 32
Vladimir Egorov (MKD) | 0
Abubakar Mutaliev (RUS) | 10
Manvel Khndzrtsyan (ARM) | 11
Yun Min-hyeok (KOR) | 0
Roman Hutsuliak (UKR) | 0
Milad Valizadeh (IRI) | 11
Edwin Segura (GUA) | 0
Spencer Lee (USA) | 11

Round of 16
Abubakar Mutaliev (RUS) | 8
Manvel Khndzrtsyan (ARM) | 7
Milad Valizadeh (IRI) | 2
Spencer Lee (USA) | 12

Quarterfinals
Abubakar Mutaliev (RUS) | 0
Spencer Lee (USA) | 11

=== Repechage ===
Repechage round 2
Meirambek Kartbay (KAZ) | WO
~~John Leopold (MRI)~~
Edwin Segura (GUA) | 0
Milad Valizadeh (IRI) | 10

Repechage round 3
Meirambek Kartbay (KAZ) | 8
Batkhuyagiin Mönkh-Erdene (MGL) | 10
Milad Valizadeh (IRI) | 13
Abubakar Mutaliev (RUS) | 17^{F}

Bronze medals
Batkhuyagiin Mönkh-Erdene (MGL) | 1
Han Chong-song (PRK) | 3
Abubakar Mutaliev (RUS) | 6
Islam Bazarganov (AZE) | 2

== Final standing ==
| Rank | Athlete |
|---|---|
| 1st place, gold medalist(s) | Spencer Lee (USA) |
| 2nd place, silver medalist(s) | Roman Bravo-Young (MEX) |
| 3rd place, bronze medalist(s) | Han Chong-song (PRK) |
| 3rd place, bronze medalist(s) | Abubakar Mutaliev (RUS) |
| 5 | Batkhuyagiin Mönkh-Erdene (MGL) |
| 5 | Islam Bazarganov (AZE) |
| 7 | Milad Valizadeh (IRI) |
| 8 | Aryan Tsiutryn (BLR) |
| 9 | Abdymalik Karachov (KGZ) |
| 10 | Meirambek Kartbay (KAZ) |
| 11 | Yamato Ogawa (JPN) |
| 12 | Manvel Khndzrtsyan (ARM) |
| 13 | Azamat Tuskaev (SRB) |
| 14 | Pedro Mejías (VEN) |
| 15 | Thomas Epp (SUI) |
| 16 | Yun Min-hyeok (KOR) |
| 17 | Niklas Stechele (GER) |
| 18 | Makaya Katendi (ANG) |
| 19 | Xie Qingkan (CHN) |
| 20 | Andrei Vitan (MDA) |
| 21 | Timothy Levine (CAN) |
| 22 | Darian Cruz (PUR) |
| 23 | Aiaal Belolyubskii (TJK) |
| 24 | Muhammet Karavuş (TUR) |
| 25 | Asadbek Saidturaev (UZB) |
| 26 | Diamantino Iuna Fafé (GBS) |
| 27 | Roberti Dingashvili (GEO) |
| 28 | Vladimir Egorov (MKD) |
| 29 | Isaac Wong (HKG) |
| 30 | Mouadh Chibani (ALG) |
| 31 | Rahul Deswal (IND) |
| 32 | Roman Hutsuliak (UKR) |
| 33 | Edwin Segura (GUA) |
| — | John Leopold (MRI) |
