= Spencer Lee =

American wrestler (born 1998)

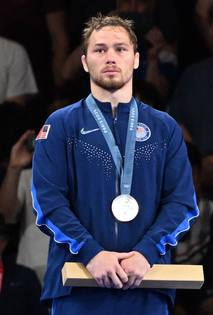
- Lee at the 2024 Summer Olympics

Personal information
- Full name: Spencer Richard Lee
- Born: October 14, 1998 (age 28) Denver, Colorado, U.S.
- Home town: Murrysville, Pennsylvania, U.S.
- Height: 5 ft 4 in (163 cm)
- Weight: 57 kg (126 lb)
- Website: hoo.be/spencerlee365

Sport
- Country: United States
- Sport: Wrestling
- Events: Freestyle and Folkstyle
- College team: Iowa
- Club: Hawkeye Wrestling Club; Titan Mercury Wrestling Club; Young Guns Wrestling Club
- Coached by: Tom Brands; Terry Brands

Achievements and titles
- Olympic finals: (silver) (2024)
Medal record
Men's freestyle wrestling
Representing the United States
Olympic Games
Silver medal – second place	2024 Paris	57 kg
World Championships
Gold medal – first place	2026 Astana	57 kg
Pan American Championships
Gold medal – first place	2024 Acapulco	57 kg
Grand Prix
Gold medal – first place	2023 New York City	57 kg
Gold medal – first place	2025 Nice	57 kg
Gold medal – first place	2025 Zagreb	57 kg
Gold medal – first place	2026 Zagreb	57 kg
Gold medal – first place	2026 Tirana	57 kg
US National Championships
Gold medal – first place	2019 Fort Worth	57 kg
Gold medal – first place	2023 Fort Worth	57 kg
Silver medal – second place	2026 Las Vegas	57 kg
U20 World Championships
Gold medal – first place	2015 Salvador	50 kg
Gold medal – first place	2016 Mâcon	50 kg
U17 World Championships
Gold medal – first place	2014 Snina	50 kg
Men's collegiate wrestling
Representing Iowa Hawkeyes
NCAA Division I Championships
Gold medal – first place	2018 Cleveland	125 lb
Gold medal – first place	2019 Pittsburgh	125 lb
Gold medal – first place	2021 St. Louis	125 lb
Big Ten Championships
Gold medal – first place	2020 Piscataway	125 lb
Gold medal – first place	2021 State College	125 lb
Gold medal – first place	2023 Ann Arbor	125 lb
Silver medal – second place	2019 Minneapolis	125 lb
Bronze medal – third place	2018 East Lansing	125 lb

Spencer Richard Lee (born October 14, 1998) is an American freestyle and former folkstyle wrestler who competes at 57 kilograms. In freestyle, he earned a silver medal at the 2024 Summer Olympics, and earned Gold medal at 2026 World championships joining the prestigious club of World champions. Is also a three-time US World and Olympic Team Member and three-time age-group world champion.

In folkstyle, Lee won the James E. Sullivan Award and the Dan Hodge Trophy twice, as well as three NCAA Division I national championships out of the University of Iowa. Lee was often considered one of the most dominant athletes in college athletics.

== Career ==
=== Background ===
Lee was born in Denver, Colorado, but grew up in Saegertown, Pennsylvania before moving to Murrysville, where he attended Franklin Regional High School.

While in high school, Lee became a three-time PIAA Class AAA state champion and recorded 144 wins before suffering his first and only loss in a dramatic upset while going for a fourth state title. The wrestler he lost to, Austin DeSanto, would eventually become his college teammate. In freestyle wrestling, Lee became a two-time U20 World champion and a U17 World champion during his high school years.

Before his senior year, Lee committed to wrestle at the University of Iowa. A multiple-time national champion in different tournaments, Lee was the top-ranked wrestler in the country at the time of his commitment.

=== College ===
==== 2017–2018 ====
Lee initially competed under a redshirt during his first year of collegiate wrestling, winning the UNI Open and placing sixth at the Midland Championships before having it pulled and competing as a true freshman instead.

During regular season, Lee recorded wins over NCAA champions and All-Americans, before placing third at the Big Ten Championships. At the NCAA championships, Lee had an outstanding run into the finals, where he defeated undefeated-in-the-season Nick Suriano to claim his first national championship.

Lee was named the Big Ten Freshman of the Year and closed out the year with a 22–2 record.

==== 2018–2019 ====
After an action-packed regular season, where he notably placed second at the Midland Championships, Lee placed second at the Big Ten Championships and headed off to the NCAA tournament. Lee captured his second-straight national crown after running through the bracket, defeating Jack Mueller in the finals and closing out the year 23–3.

==== 2019–2020 ====
In December 2019, Lee made his senior-level debut, becoming the US National champion in freestyle and qualifying for the US Olympic Team Trials with notable wins over eventual World champion Vito Arujau and NCAA champions Darian Cruz and Nathan Tomasello.

During his third season in college, Lee compiled an 18–0 record, grabbed his first Big Ten Conference title and was a favorite heading into the NCAA championships. However, the national tournament was cancelled as a result of the COVID-19 pandemic.

After the cut-short season, Lee was awarded the James E. Sullivan Award as the most outstanding athlete in the United States and the Dan Hodge Trophy as the best college wrestler in the country. He was also named the Big Ten Wrestler of the Year after outscoring the opposition 234 to 18.

The US Olympic Team Trials, where Lee was set to compete in, were delayed for 2021 due to the COVID-19 pandemic.

==== 2020–2021 ====
Before folkstyle season started, Lee pinned four-time All-American Zach Sanders at the HWC 1 in freestyle.

Lee then pinned all of his opponents in the first period during regular season, grabbed his second Big Ten title and became a three-time NCAA champion, dominating everyone throughout the season. Lee later revealed he had torn his left ACL eight days before the tournament to match a torn right ACL suffered in the 2019 NCAA finals.

Lee was then named the Dan Hodge Trophy winner for the second straight time, along with Gable Steveson. He was repeated as the Big Ten Wrestler of the Year.

Lee was then set to compete at the US Olympic Team Trials in freestyle, however, he opted against participating due to his knee injuries.

===== 2021–2022 =====
Since the NCAA granted athletes an extra year of eligibility after the 2020 season was cut short, Lee was set to compete in his last year of collegiate wrestling. However, he achieved a 3–0 record before being pulled out of the season due to requiring surgery on both knees after recurring injuries, using a medical redshirt.

==== 2022–2023 ====
Lee started off his final year of folkstyle wrestling undefeated in dual action and claiming the Soldier Salute and Big Ten titles. At the NCAA tournament, where he was looking for a fourth national title, Lee cruised to the semifinals, where he faced Matt Ramos, whom he had previously pinned at a dual meet. After an electric match, Lee was defeated by Ramos in one of the biggest upsets in the sports' history, and proceeded to medical forfeit out of the tournament, placing sixth.

Lee graduated with three NCAA Division I National titles and Big Ten Conference titles, and a record of 98–6. After his college career was over, Lee switched his focus to freestyle.

=== Freestyle ===
==== 2023 ====
In April, Lee wrestled in his first freestyle tournament since 2019, at the US Open National Championships. After three straight wins to reach the semis, where he was set to wrestle Nick Suriano, Lee forfeited out of the tournament due to his knee injuries, placing sixth.

Lee then competed at the Bill Farrell Memorial in November. He racked up dominant wins over the likes of Commonwealth Games medalist Muhammad Bilal and U20 World silver medalist Luke Lilledahl to make the finals, where he defeated NCAA and US Open champion Nico Megaludis to claim gold and qualify for the 2024 US Olympic Trials.

Despite having already qualified for the US Olympic Trials, Lee competed at the US Senior Nationals on December, where he once again defeated Megaludis and picked up a gold medal to extend his win-streak.

==== 2024 ====
To start off February, Lee competed internationally for the first time since 2016, grabbing a Pan American title with quick victories over 2020 Olympian Óscar Tigreros and multiple-time Pan American medalist Pedro Mejías.

In April, Lee competed at the US Olympic Team Trials, defeating NCAA champion Nico Megaludis for a third time and reigning US World Team Member Zane Richards to advance to the best-of-three finals, where he faced World champion and former teammate Thomas Gilman. He defeated Gilman twice in a row to become the US Olympic Team Member at 57 kilograms.

Lee then competed at the World Qualification Tournament, in an attempt to qualify the weight for the United States and earn the right to compete at the 2024 Summer Olympics. After a quick win over Morocco, Lee defeated U23 World medalist Zou Wanhao from China in a tight, high-scoring match to advance in the tournament. Then, he defeated European champion Vladimir Egorov from North Macedonia in a battle of continental champions, to make the semifinals, where he reigned over two-time Asian medalist Rakhat Kalzhan from Kazakhstan. This result made Lee a 2024 Summer Olympian.

In August, Lee made his Olympic debut at the 2024 Summer Olympics in Paris. On the first day, he earned a rematch win over Zou Wanhao from China, as well as two technical falls over two-time U23 World medalist Bekzat Almaz Uulu from Kyrgyzstan and two-time Olympian Gulomjon Abdullaev from Uzbekistan, advancing to the finals and securing a medal. On the next day, he contested the gold-medal match against Olympic silver medalist and World champion Rei Higuchi from Japan, losing in a tight bout and earning the silver medal after his first defeat on the senior level.

Lee was then expected to compete at the Kunayev D.A. in Kazakhstan in December, though he later withdrew from the tournament to close out the year.

==== 2025 ====
To start off January, Lee claimed the gold medal at the Grand Prix de France Henri Deglane after earning five technical falls over foreign opposition. In February, he ran through the Grand Prix Zagreb Open, notably defeating European medalist Islam Bazarganov and two-time NCAA champion Roman Bravo-Young in a highly anticipated bout.

Lee then bumped up to 59.5 kilograms to meet 61-kilogram World Champion Masanosuke Ono on February 26, headlining FloWrestling: Night in America. He lost the bout on points, marking the second loss in his career.

As a returning Olympic medalist, Lee accepted his berth to June's Final X and defeated US Open champion Luke Lilledahl twice in a row in a best-of-three series to make his first world team.

2026

Spencer Lee captured his first senior-level gold medal at the 2026 World Wrestling Championships in the 57kg division. His tournament included a dramatic semi final deficit against Azerbaijan's Islam Bazarganov before turning him for the fall, sending Lee to the Finals. In the finals Lee dominated former Penn State national champion, Roman bravo-young, winning 10-0 by technical superiority in just 26 seconds. Even more impressive is achieving the feat after tearing his ACL just 3 weeks prior to the tournament. After winning Olympic silver in 2024, and numerous injuries throughout his career, Lee finally achieved his dream of reaching the top of senior international wrestling world.

== Personal life ==
Lee's mother, Cathy, was a French Olympic alternate judoka and his father, Larry, also practiced the sport. Lee is a Pokémon enthusiast.

== Freestyle record ==
Senior Freestyle Matches
Res.	Record	Opponent	Score	Date	Event	Location
2026 US World Team Trials (gold) at 57 kg
Win	55–5	(United States) Luke Lilledahl	8–4	June 19, 2026	2026 Final X	(United States) Newark, New Jersey
Win	54–5	(United States) Luke Lilledahl	7–1	June 19, 2026	2026 Final X	(United States) Newark, New Jersey
Win	53–5	(United States) Anthony Knox	TF 13–3	May 14–15, 2026	2026 US World Team Trials Challenge	(United States) Louisville, Kentucky
Win	52–5	(United States) Brody Teske	TF 12–2	May 14–15, 2026	2026 US World Team Trials Challenge	(United States) Louisville, Kentucky
2026 US Open (silver) at 57 kg
Loss	51–5	(United States) Luke Lilledahl	4–5	April 24–25, 2026	2026 US Open National Championships	(United States) Las Vegas, Nevada
Win	51–4	(United States) Anthony Knox	Fall	April 24–25, 2026	2026 US Open National Championships	(United States) Las Vegas, Nevada
Win	50–4	(United States) Ezekiel Witt	TF 10–0	April 24–25, 2026	2026 US Open National Championships	(United States) Las Vegas, Nevada
Win	49–4	(United States) Koda Holeman	TF 10–0	April 24–25, 2026	2026 US Open National Championships	(United States) Las Vegas, Nevada
2026 Muhamet Malo Ranking Series (gold) at 57 kg
Win	48–4	(Russia) Ramiz Gamzatov	TF 10–0	February 25, 2026	2026 Muhamet Malo Tournament	Tirana, Albania
Win	47–4	(Germany) Horst Lehr	TF 14–4	February 25, 2026	2026 Muhamet Malo Tournament	Tirana, Albania
Win	46–4	(Georgia (country)) Roberti Dingashvili	TF 15–4	February 25, 2026	2026 Muhamet Malo Tournament	Tirana, Albania
Win	45–4	(India) Atish Todkar	TF 10–0	February 25, 2026	2026 Muhamet Malo Tournament	Tirana, Albania
2026 Grand Prix Zagreb Open (gold) at 57 kg
Win	44–4	(Mexico) Roman Bravo-Young	VIN (4–0)	February 4, 2026	2026 Grand Prix Zagreb Open	Zagreb, Croatia
Win	43–4	(Japan) Fuga Sasaki	10–2	February 4, 2026	2026 Grand Prix Zagreb Open	Zagreb, Croatia
Win	42–4	(Serbia) Azamat Tuskaev	4–0	February 4, 2026	2026 Grand Prix Zagreb Open	Zagreb, Croatia
Loss	41–4	(Ukraine) Andriy Yatsenko	Fall	November 29, 2025	RAF 03	(United States) Chicago, Illinois
2025 World Championships 9th at 57 kg
Loss	41–3	(Armenia) Arsen Harutyunyan	TF 3–14	September 14, 2025	2025 World Championships	Zagreb, Croatia
Win	41–2	(Turkey) Yusuf Demir	TF 10–0	September 14, 2025	2025 World Championships	Zagreb, Croatia
2025 US World Team Trials (gold) at 57 kg
Win	40–2	(United States) Luke Lilledahl	6–0	June 14, 2025	2025 Final X	(United States) Newark, New Jersey
Win	39–2	(United States) Luke Lilledahl	7–2	June 14, 2025	2025 Final X	(United States) Newark, New Jersey
Loss	38–2	(Japan) Masanosuke Ono	2–3	February 26, 2025	FloWrestling: Night in America – 59.5 kg	(United States) Coralville, Iowa
2025 Grand Prix Zagreb Open (gold) at 57 kg
Win	38–1	(Azerbaijan) Islam Bazarganov	6–2	February 5, 2025	2025 Grand Prix Zagreb Open	Zagreb, Croatia
Win	37–1	(Mexico) Roman Bravo-Young	6–3	February 5, 2025	2025 Grand Prix Zagreb Open	Zagreb, Croatia
Win	36–1	(Georgia (country)) Luka Gvinjilia	TF 11–0	February 5, 2025	2025 Grand Prix Zagreb Open	Zagreb, Croatia
2025 Henri Deglane Grand Prix (gold) at 57 kg
Win	35–1	(Switzerland) Tomas Epp	TF 10–0	January 18, 2025	Grand Prix de France Henri Deglane 2025	Nice, France
Win	34–1	(Ecuador) Guesseppe Rea	TF 10–0	January 18, 2025	Grand Prix de France Henri Deglane 2025	Nice, France
Win	33–1	(Switzerland) Sayed Jamshidi	TF 10–0	January 18, 2025	Grand Prix de France Henri Deglane 2025	Nice, France
Win	32–1	(France) Gaspard Cheynoux	TF 10–0	January 18, 2025	Grand Prix de France Henri Deglane 2025	Nice, France
Win	31–1	(Morocco) Ben Tarik	TF 10–0	January 18, 2025	Grand Prix de France Henri Deglane 2025	Nice, France
2024 Summer Olympics (silver) at 57 kg
Loss	30–1	(Japan) Rei Higuchi	2–4	August 9, 2024	2024 Summer Olympics	Paris, France
Win	30–0	(Uzbekistan) Gulomjon Abdullaev	TF 14–4	August 8, 2024	2024 Summer Olympics	Paris, France
Win	29–0	(Kyrgyzstan) Bekzat Almaz Uulu	TF 12–2	August 8, 2024	2024 Summer Olympics	Paris, France
Win	28–0	(China) Zou Wanhao	3–2	August 8, 2024	2024 Summer Olympics	Paris, France
2024 World Olympic Qualification Tournament (gold) at 57 kg
Win	27–0	(Kazakhstan) Rakhat Kalzhan	TF 10–0	May 11, 2024	2024 World Olympic Qualification Tournament	Istanbul, Turkey
Win	26–0	(North Macedonia) Vladimir Egorov	TF 12–2	May 11, 2024	2024 World Olympic Qualification Tournament	Istanbul, Turkey
Win	25–0	(China) Zou Wanhao	10–9	May 11, 2024	2024 World Olympic Qualification Tournament	Istanbul, Turkey
Win	24–0	(Morocco) Ben Tarik	TF 10–0	May 11, 2024	2024 World Olympic Qualification Tournament	Istanbul, Turkey
2024 US Olympic Team Trials (gold) at 57 kg
Win	23–0	(United States) Thomas Gilman	Fall	April 20, 2024	2024 US Olympic Team Trials	(United States) State College, Pennsylvania
Win	22–0	(United States) Thomas Gilman	6–3	April 20, 2024	2024 US Olympic Team Trials	(United States) State College, Pennsylvania
Win	21–0	(United States) Zane Richards	13–6	April 19, 2024	2024 US Olympic Team Trials	(United States) State College, Pennsylvania
Win	20–0	(United States) Nico Megaludis	8–0	April 19, 2024	2024 US Olympic Team Trials	(United States) State College, Pennsylvania
2024 Pan American Championships (gold) at 57 kg
Win	19–0	(Venezuela) Pedro Mejías	TF 12–2	February 24, 2024	2024 Pan American Continental Championships	Acapulco, Mexico
Win	18–0	(Brazil) Davi Silva Giovannetti	TF 10–0	February 24, 2024	2024 Pan American Continental Championships	Acapulco, Mexico
Win	17–0	(Colombia) Óscar Tigreros	TF 10–0	February 24, 2024	2024 Pan American Continental Championships	Acapulco, Mexico
2023 US Nationals (gold) at 57 kg
Win	16–0	(United States) Nico Megaludis	6–2	December 16–17, 2023	2023 US National Championships	(United States) Fort Worth, Texas
Win	15–0	(United States) Josh Rodriguez	TF 12–1	December 16–17, 2023	2023 US National Championships	(United States) Fort Worth, Texas
Win	14–0	(United States) Gary Steen	TF 10–0	December 16–17, 2023	2023 US National Championships	(United States) Fort Worth, Texas
2023 Bill Farrell Memorial (gold) at 57 kg
Win	13–0	(United States) Nico Megaludis	7–4	November 18, 2023	2023 Bill Farrell Memorial International	(United States) New York City, New York
Win	12–0	(United States) Luke Lilledahl	TF 11–0	November 18, 2023	2023 Bill Farrell Memorial International	(United States) New York City, New York
Win	11–0	(United States) Devan Turner	TF 11–0	November 18, 2023	2023 Bill Farrell Memorial International	(United States) New York City, New York
Win	10–0	(Pakistan) Muhammad Bilal	TF 10–0	November 18, 2023	2023 Bill Farrell Memorial International	(United States) New York City, New York
2023 US Open 6th at 57 kg
Loss		(United States) Nick Suriano	FF	April 27, 2023	2023 US Open National Championships	(United States) Las Vegas, Nevada
Win	9–0	(United States) Caleb Smith	9–4	April 27, 2023	2023 US Open National Championships	(United States) Las Vegas, Nevada
Win	8–0	(United States) Sheldon Seymour	TF 10–0	April 27, 2023	2023 US Open National Championships	(United States) Las Vegas, Nevada
Win	7–0	(United States) Darrion Harris	TF 10–0	April 27, 2023	2023 US Open National Championships	(United States) Las Vegas, Nevada
Win	6–0	(United States) Zach Sanders	Fall	November 1, 2020	HWC Showdown Open	(United States) Iowa City, Iowa
2019 US Nationals (gold) at 57 kg
Win	5–0	(United States) Nathan Tomasello	8–2	December 20–22, 2019	2019 US Senior National Championships	(United States) Fort Worth, Texas
Win	4–0	(United States) Vitali Arujau	TF 14–4	December 20–22, 2019	2019 US Senior National Championships	(United States) Fort Worth, Texas
Win	3–0	(United States) Darian Cruz	TF 10–0	December 20–22, 2019	2019 US Senior National Championships	(United States) Fort Worth, Texas
Win	2–0	(United States) Shane Kim	TF 10–0	December 20–22, 2019	2019 US Senior National Championships	(United States) Fort Worth, Texas
Win	1–0	(United States) Jacob Moran	TF 10–0	December 20–22, 2019	2019 US Senior National Championships	(United States) Fort Worth, Texas

== NCAA record ==
NCAA Division I Record
Res.	Record	Opponent	Score	Date	Event
End of 2022–2023 Season (senior extra-year)
2023 NCAA Championships 6th at 125 lbs
Loss	98–6	Matt Ramos	Fall	March 16–18, 2023	2023 NCAA Division I Wrestling Championships
Win	98–5	Anthony Noto	MD 14–4	March 16–18, 2023	2023 NCAA Division I Wrestling Championships
Win	97–5	Jack Medley	TF 17–0	March 16–18, 2023	2023 NCAA Division I Wrestling Championships
Win	96–5	Tucker Owens	Fall	March 16–18, 2023	2023 NCAA Division I Wrestling Championships
2023 Big Ten Conference (gold) at 125 lbs
Win	95–5	Liam Cronin	8–2	March 3–5, 2023	2023 Big Ten Conference Championships
Win	94–5	Patrick McKee	TF 20–2	March 3–5, 2023	2023 Big Ten Conference Championships
Win	93–5	Jack Medley	TF 17–0	March 3–5, 2023	2023 Big Ten Conference Championships
Win	92–5	Reece Witcraft	Fall	February 19, 2023	Iowa - Oklahoma State Dual
Win	91–5	Jack Medley	MD 11–2	February 10, 2023	Iowa - Michigan Dual
Win	90–5	Patrick McKee	7–1	February 3, 2023	Iowa - Minnesota Dual
Win	89–5	Marco Vespa	TF 18–2	January 27, 2023	Iowa - Penn State Dual
Win	88–5	Eric Barnett	Fall	January 22, 2023	Iowa - Wisconsin Dual
Win	87–5	Liam Cronin	Fall	January 20, 2023	Iowa - Nebraska Dual
Win	86–5	Michael DeAugustino	Fall	January 13, 2023	Iowa - Northwestern Dual
Win	85–5	Matt Ramos	Fall	January 8, 2023	Iowa - Purdue Dual
Win	84–5	Maximo Renteria	Fall	January 6, 2023	Iowa - Illinois Dual
2022 Soldier Salute (gold) at 125 lbs
Win	83–5	Drake Ayala	Fall	December 29–30, 2022	2022 Soldier Salute
Win	82–5	Jore Volk	MD 15–5	December 29–30, 2022	2022 Soldier Salute
Win	81–5	Charlie Farmer	TF 19–1	December 29–30, 2022	2022 Soldier Salute
Win	80–5	Damion Ryan	Fall	December 29–30, 2022	2022 Soldier Salute
Win	79–5	Corey Cabanban	MD 16–5	December 4, 2022	Iowa - Iowa State Dual
Start of 2022–2023 Season (senior extra-year)
End of 2021–2022 Season (senior extra-year)
Win	78–5	Jakob Camacho	6–1	December 21, 2021	North Carolina State - Iowa Dual
Win	77–5	Jaret Lane	MD 8–0	December 20, 2021	Lehigh - Iowa Dual
Win	76–5	Brock Bergelin	TF 17–0	December 20, 2021	Central Michigan - Iowa Dual
Start of 2021-2022 Season (senior extra-year)
End of 2020-2021 Season (senior year)
2021 NCAA Championships (gold) at 125 lbs
Win	75–5	Brandon Courtney	7–0	March 18–20, 2021	2021 NCAA Division I Wrestling Championships
Win	74–5	Drew Hildebrandt	MD 11–0	March 18–20, 2021	2021 NCAA Division I Wrestling Championships
Win	73–5	Devin Schroder	MD 10–2	March 18–20, 2021	2021 NCAA Division I Wrestling Championships
Win	72–5	Killian Cardinale	MD 15–5	March 18–20, 2021	2021 NCAA Division I Wrestling Championships
Win	71–5	Patrick McCormick	TF 17–1	March 18–20, 2021	2021 NCAA Division I Wrestling Championships
2021 Big Ten Conference (gold) at 125 lbs
Win	70–5	Devin Schroder	TF 21–3	March 6–7, 2021	2021 Big Ten Conference Championships
Win	69–5	Rayvon Foley	Fall	March 6–7, 2021	2021 Big Ten Conference Championships
Win	68–5	Dylan Ragusin	TF 19–4	March 6–7, 2021	2021 Big Ten Conference Championships
Win	67–5	Brady Koontz	Fall	February 7, 2021	Iowa - Ohio State Dual
Win	66–5	Justin Cardani	Fall	January 31, 2021	Iowa - Illinois Dual
Win	65–5	Patrick McKee	Fall	January 22, 2021	Iowa - Minnesota Dual
Win	64–5	Liam Cronin	Fall	January 15, 2021	Nebraska - Iowa Dual
Start of 2020-2021 Season (senior year)
End of 2019-2020 Season (junior year)
2020 Big Ten Conference (gold) at 125 lbs
Win	63–5	Devin Schroder	MD 16–2	March 8, 2020	2020 Big Ten Conference Championships
Win	62–5	Jack Medley	TF 19–3	March 8, 2020	2020 Big Ten Conference Championships
Win	61–5	Nicolas Aguilar	Fall	March 8, 2020	2020 Big Ten Conference Championships
Win	60–5	Nick Piccininni	MD 12–3	February 23, 2020	Oklahoma State - Iowa Dual
Win	59–5	Forfeit	FF	February 15, 2020	Minnesota - Iowa Dual
Win	58–5	Jack Medley	8–1	February 8, 2020	Iowa - Michigan Dual
Win	57–5	Logan Griffin	Fall	February 2, 2020	Iowa - Michigan State Dual
Win	56–5	Brandon Meredith	TF 16–1	January 31, 2020	Penn State - Iowa Dual
Win	55–5	Hunter Lucas	TF 18–0	January 24, 2020	Ohio State - Iowa Dual
Win	54–5	Alex Thomsen	TF 18–0	January 18, 2020	Nebraska - Iowa Dual
Win	53–5	Devin Schroder	TF 15–0	January 12, 2020	Iowa - Purdue Dual
Win	52–5	Liam Cronin	TF 15–0	January 10, 2020	Iowa - Indiana Dual
2019 Midlands Championships 5th at 125 lbs
Win	51–5	Connor Ryan	Fall	December 29, 2019	2019 Midlands Invitational Championships
Win	50–5	Christian Moody	Fall	December 29, 2019	2019 Midlands Invitational Championships
Win	49–5	Liam Cronin	Fall	December 29, 2019	2019 Midlands Invitational Championships
Win	48–5	Michael Cullen	TF 16–0	December 1, 2019	Wisconsin - Iowa Dual
Win	47–5	Alex Mackall	TF 17–2	November 24, 2019	Iowa - Iowa State Dual
Win	46–5	Fabian Gutierrez	MD 16–5	November 17, 2019	Chattanooga - Iowa Dual
Start of 2019-2020 Season (junior year)
End of 2018-2019 Season (sophomore year)
2019 NCAA Championships (gold) at 125 lbs
Win	45–5	Jack Mueller	5–0	March 23, 2019	2019 NCAA Division I Wrestling Championships
Win	44–5	Nick Piccininni	11–4	March 23, 2019	2019 NCAA Division I Wrestling Championships
Win	43–5	Sean Russell	Fall	March 23, 2019	2019 NCAA Division I Wrestling Championships
Win	42–5	Sean Fausz	MD 10–1	March 23, 2019	2019 NCAA Division I Wrestling Championships
Win	41–5	Bryce West	TF 18–0	March 23, 2019	2019 NCAA Division I Wrestling Championships
2019 Big Ten Conference (silver) at 125 lbs
Loss	40–5	Sebastian Rivera	4–6	Mar 10, 2019	2019 Big Ten Championships
Win	40–4	Sean Russell	MD 8–0	Mar 10, 2019	2019 Big Ten Championships
Win	39–4	Elijah Oliver	Fall	Mar 10, 2019	2019 Big Ten Championships
Loss	38–4	Nick Piccininni	Fall	Feb 24, 2019	Iowa - Oklahoma State Dual
Win	38–3	Ethan Rotondo	Fall	Feb 17, 2019	Iowa - Wisconsin Dual
Win	37–3	Elijah Oliver	Fall	February 15, 2019	Indiana - Iowa Dual
Win	36–3	Brandon Cray	Fall	February 8, 2019	Maryland - Iowa Dual
Win	35–3	Zeke Moisey	MD 18–4	February 3, 2019	Iowa - Nebraska Dual
Win	34–3	Travis Piotrowski	Fall	Jan 25, 2019	Iowa - Illinois Dual
Win	33–3	Nick DeNora	Fall	January 18, 2019	Rutgers - Iowa Dual
Win	32–3	Sean Russell	4–0	January 13, 2019	Iowa - Minnesota Dual
2018 Midlands Championships (silver) at 125 lbs
Loss	31–3	Sebastian Rivera	3–7	December 29, 2018	2018 Midlands Invitational Championships
Win	31–2	Pat Glory	12–6	December 29, 2018	2018 Midlands Invitational Championships
Win	30–2	Drew Hildebrandt	TF 18–0	December 29, 2018	2018 Midlands Invitational Championships
Win	29–2	Bryce West	TF 17–0	December 29, 2018	2018 Midlands Invitational Championships
Win	28–2	Malik Heinselman	Fall	December 29, 2018	2018 Midlands Invitational Championships
Win	27–2	Luke Resnick	TF 15–0	December 8, 2018	Lehigh - Iowa Dual
Win	26–2	Alex Mackall	MD 13–4	December 1, 2018	Iowa State - Iowa Dual
Win	25–2	Pat Glory	TF 18–2	November 16, 2018	Princeton - Iowa Dual
Win	24–2	Alejandro Hernandez-Figueroa	TF 18–0	November 9, 2018	Iowa - CSU Bakersfield Dual
Win	23–2	Tomas Gutierrez	TF 16–0	November 9, 2018	Iowa - Kenn State Dual
Start of 2018-2019 Season (sophomore year)
End of 2017-2018 Season (freshman year)
2018 NCAA Championships (gold) at 125 lbs
Win	22–2	Nick Suriano	5–1	March 17, 2018	2018 NCAA Division I Wrestling Championships
Win	21–2	Nathan Tomasello	Fall	March 17, 2018	2018 NCAA Division I Wrestling Championships
Win	20–2	Nick Piccininni	Fall	March 17, 2018	2018 NCAA Division I Wrestling Championships
Win	19–2	Luke Welch	TF 18–0	March 17, 2018	2018 NCAA Division I Wrestling Championships
Win	18–2	Alonzo Allen	TF 18–0	March 17, 2018	2018 NCAA Division I Wrestling Championships
2018 Big Ten Conference (bronze) at 125 lbs
Win	17–2	Luke Welch	TF 16–0	Mar 3, 2018	2018 Big Ten Championships
Win	16–2	Sebastian Rivera	MD 12–0	Mar 3, 2018	2018 Big Ten Championships
Loss	15–2	Nathan Tomasello	1–2	Mar 3, 2018	2018 Big Ten Championships
Win	15–1	Rayvon Foley	Fall	Mar 3, 2018	2018 Big Ten Championships
Win	14–1	Sinjin Briggs	Fall	Feb 18, 2018	Iowa - Iowa State Dual
Win	13–1	Carson Kuhn	Fall	Feb 10, 2018	Iowa - Penn State Dual
Win	12–1	Sebastian Rivera	7–4	February 4, 2018	Northwestern - Iowa Dual
Win	11–1	Ethan Lizak	TF 15–0	February 2, 2018	Minnesota - Iowa Dual
Win	10–1	Drew Mattin	TF 15–0	Jan 27, 2018	Michigan - Iowa Dual
Win	9–1	Nathan Tomasello	3–2	Jan 21, 2018	Iowa - Ohio State Dual
Win	8–1	Nick Piccininni	10–5	January 14, 2018	Oklahoma State - Iowa Dual
Win	7–1	Rayvon Foley	Fall	January 5, 2018	Michigan State - Iowa Dual
2017 Midlands Championships 6th at 125 lbs
Loss	6–1	Ronnie Bresser	1–3	December 29, 2017	2017 Midlands Invitational Championships
Win	6–0	Sean Russell	TF 15–0	December 29, 2017	2017 Midlands Invitational Championships
Win	5–0	Travis Piotrowski	TF 17–2	December 29, 2017	2017 Midlands Invitational Championships
Win	4–0	Killian Cardinale	Fall	December 29, 2017	2017 Midlands Invitational Championships
2017 UNI Open (gold) at 125 lbs
Win	3–0	Skyler Petry	Fall	December 9, 2017	2017 UNI Open Tournament
Win	2–0	Johnny Jimenez	Fall	December 9, 2017	2017 UNI Open Tournament
Win	1–0	Dack Punke	TF 16–0	December 9, 2017	2017 UNI Open Tournament
Start of 2017-2018 Season (freshman year)

=== Stats ===
Season	Year	School	Rank	Weigh Class	Record	Win	Bonus
2023	Senior++	University of Iowa	#1 (6th)	125	20-1	95.24%	85.71
2022	Senior+	University of Iowa	DNQ	125	3–0	100.00%	66.67%
2021	Senior	University of Iowa	#1 (1st)	125	12–0	100.00%	91.67%
2020	Junior	University of Iowa	#1 (COVID)	125	18–0	100.00%	88.89%
2019	Sophomore	University of Iowa	#3 (1st)	125	23–3	88.46%	73.08%
2018	Freshman	University of Iowa	#3 (1st)	125	22–2	91.67%	75.00%
Career					98–6	94.23%	81.73%
