= 2025 World Wrestling Championships – Men's freestyle 57 kg =

Wrestling competitions

Men's freestyle 57 kg at the 2025 World Championships
- Venue: Arena Zagreb
- Dates: 14–15 September 2025
- Competitors: 31 from 29 nations

Medalists
gold medal	Han Chong-song	North Korea
silver medal	Bekzat Almaz Uulu	Kyrgyzstan
bronze medal	Arsen Harutyunyan	Armenia
bronze medal	Gulomjon Abdullaev	Uzbekistan

The men's freestyle 57 kilograms is a competition featured at the 2025 World Wrestling Championships, and was held in Zagreb, Croatia on 14 and 15 September 2025.

This freestyle wrestling competition consists of a single-elimination tournament, with a repechage used to determine the winner of two bronze medals. The two finalists face off for gold and silver medals. Each wrestler who loses to one of the two finalists moves into the repechage, culminating in a pair of bronze medal matches, featuring the semifinal losers each facing the remaining repechage opponent from their half of the bracket.

== Results ==
Legend

- F — Won by fall
- WO — Won by walkover

=== Final ===
Final
Han Chong-song (PRK)	12
Bekzat Almaz Uulu (KGZ)	9

=== Top half ===
Round of 32
Kim Sung-gwon (KOR)	1
Yusuf Demir (TUR)	2
Vladyslav Abramov (UKR)	0
Arsen Harutyunyan (ARM)	10
Azamat Tuskaev (SRB)	4
Batkhuyagiin Mönkh-Erdene (MGL)	6
Darian Cruz (PUR)	0
Han Chong-song (PRK)	8
Li Mingzhuo (CHN)	8
Guesseppe Rea (ECU)	10
Ali Momeni (IRI)	6
Thomas Epp (SUI)	1
Niklas Stechele (GER)	0
Roman Bravo-Young (MEX)	10

Round of 16
Spencer Lee (USA)	10
Yusuf Demir (TUR)	0
Arsen Harutyunyan (ARM)	13
Batkhuyagiin Mönkh-Erdene (MGL)	8
Han Chong-song (PRK)	10
Guesseppe Rea (ECU)	0
Ali Momeni (IRI)	0
Roman Bravo-Young (MEX)	6^{F}

Quarterfinals
Spencer Lee (USA)	3
Arsen Harutyunyan (ARM)	14
Han Chong-song (PRK)	4
Roman Bravo-Young (MEX)	3

Semifinals
Arsen Harutyunyan (ARM)	1
Han Chong-song (PRK)	4^{F}

=== Bottom half ===
Round of 32
~~Aman Sehrawat (IND)~~
Vladimir Egorov (MKD)	WO
Hussein Khudur (IRQ)	12
Peter Hammer (CRC)	0
Ivaylo Tisov (BUL)	8
Rin Sakamoto (JPN)	18
Garette Saunders (CAN)	0
Bekzat Almaz Uulu (KGZ)	11
Islam Bazarganov (AZE)	10
Roberti Dingashvili (GEO)	1
Aiaal Belolyubskii (TJK)	3
Musa Mekhtikhanov (UWW)	7
Adilet Almukhamedov (KAZ)	3
Aryan Tsiutryn (UWW)	6
Salaheddine Kateb (ALG)	2
Gulomjon Abdullaev (UZB)	13

Round of 16
Vladimir Egorov (MKD)	10
Hussein Khudur (IRQ)	0
Rin Sakamoto (JPN)	4
Bekzat Almaz Uulu (KGZ)	9
Islam Bazarganov (AZE)	0
Musa Mekhtikhanov (UWW)	3
Aryan Tsiutryn (UWW)	1
Gulomjon Abdullaev (UZB)	4

Quarterfinals
Vladimir Egorov (MKD)	5
Bekzat Almaz Uulu (KGZ)	16
Musa Mekhtikhanov (UWW)	2
Gulomjon Abdullaev (UZB)	4

Semifinals
Bekzat Almaz Uulu (KGZ)	8
Gulomjon Abdullaev (UZB)	0

=== Repechage ===
Repechage round 1
Darian Cruz (PUR)	7
Guesseppe Rea (ECU)	0
Garette Saunders (CAN)	WO
Rin Sakamoto (JPN)

Repechage round 2
Darian Cruz (PUR)	2
Roman Bravo-Young (MEX)	6
Garette Saunders (CAN)	0
Vladimir Egorov (MKD)	10

Bronze medals
Roman Bravo-Young (MEX)	4
Arsen Harutyunyan (ARM)	7
Vladimir Egorov (MKD)	1
Gulomjon Abdullaev (UZB)	3

== Final standing ==
Rank	Athlete
1st place, gold medalist(s)	Han Chong-song (PRK)
2nd place, silver medalist(s)	Bekzat Almaz Uulu (KGZ)
3rd place, bronze medalist(s)	Arsen Harutyunyan (ARM)
3rd place, bronze medalist(s)	Gulomjon Abdullaev (UZB)
5	Roman Bravo-Young (MEX)
5	Vladimir Egorov (MKD)
7	Musa Mekhtikhanov (UWW)
8	Rin Sakamoto (JPN)
9	Spencer Lee (USA)
10	Garette Saunders (CAN)
11	Hussein Khudur (IRQ)
12	Batkhuyagiin Mönkh-Erdene (MGL)
13	Darian Cruz (PUR)
14	Aryan Tsiutryn (UWW)
15	Islam Bazarganov (AZE)
16	Guesseppe Rea (ECU)
17	Ali Momeni (IRI)
18	Yusuf Demir (TUR)
19	Li Mingzhuo (CHN)
20	Ivaylo Tisov (BUL)
21	Azamat Tuskaev (SRB)
22	Adilet Almukhamedov (KAZ)
23	Aiaal Belolyubskii (TJK)
24	Salaheddine Kateb (ALG)
25	Kim Sung-gwon (KOR)
26	Thomas Epp (SUI)
27	Roberti Dingashvili (GEO)
28	Vladyslav Abramov (UKR)
29	Niklas Stechele (GER)
30	Peter Hammer (CRC)
—	Aman Sehrawat (IND)
