= Wrestling at the 2024 Summer Olympics – Men's freestyle 57 kg =

Men's freestyle 57 kg at the Games of the XXXIII Olympiad
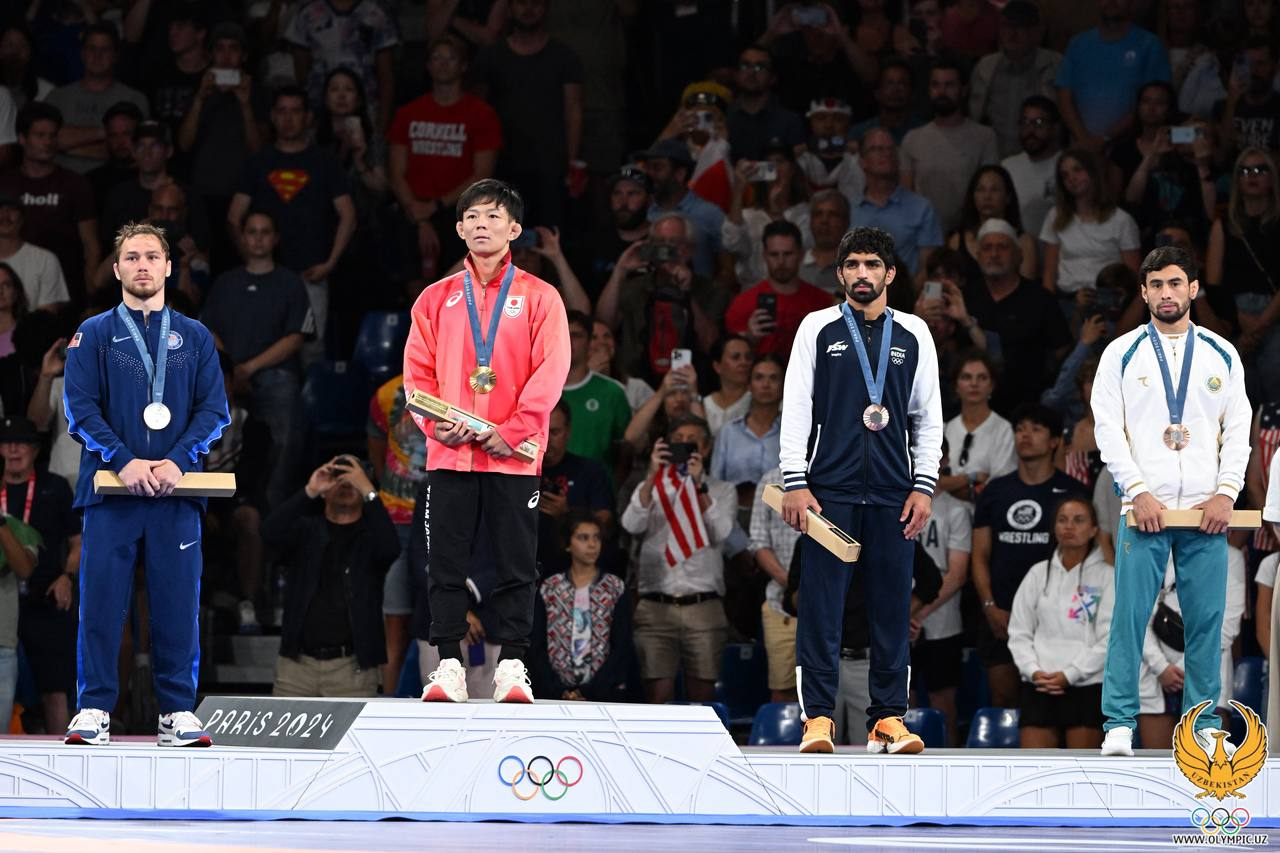
- Medalists Spencer Lee, Rei Higuchi, Aman Sehrawat, and Gulomjon Abdullaev stand on the podium at the award ceremony
- Venue: Grand Palais Éphémère
- Date: 8–9 August 2024
- Competitors: 16 from 16 nations

Medalists
| 1st place, gold medalist(s) | | Rei Higuchi | Japan |
| 2nd place, silver medalist(s) | | Spencer Lee | United States |
| 3rd place, bronze medalist(s) | | Aman Sehrawat | India |
| 3rd place, bronze medalist(s) | | Gulomjon Abdullaev | Uzbekistan |

Men's freestyle 57 kilograms competition at the 2024 Summer Olympics in Paris, France, took place on 8–9 August 2024 at the Grand Palais Éphémère in Champ de Mars.

== Background ==
This is the 26th appearance of men's freestyle bantamweight category.

- 1904 -56.7kg (demonstration event)
- 1908 -54kg,

1912-1920 not held

- 1924-1936 -56kg
- 1948-1996 -57kg
- 2000 -58kg
- 2004-2012 -55kg
- 2016-current -57kg

Return 2016 silver medalist Rei Higuchi won the event by defeating Spencer Lee in the final, India's Aman and Uzbekistan's Gulomjon Abdullaev won the bronze medals respectively.

== Format ==
This freestyle wrestling competition consists of a single-elimination tournament, with a repechage used to determine the winner of two bronze medals. The two finalists face off for gold and silver medals. Each wrestler who loses to one of the two finalists moves into the repechage, culminating in a pair of bronze medal matches featuring the semifinal losers each facing the remaining repechage opponent from their half of the bracket.

== Rules ==
A typical bout consists of two halves of three minutes each separated by a 30-second break. The two competitors compete on a mat, which is nine meters in diameter. Wrestlers try to score points by executing various legal maneuvers. Points ranging from one to five are awarded by the mat referee depending on the degree of difficulty of the maneuvers. Points are also awarded to the opponent in case of infractions such as illegal holds, passivity etc. A wrestler is automatically disqualified if three cautions are awarded during a bout. Forcing an opponent's shoulders to the mat results in an instant victory by fall.

During the course of a match, if a wrestler builds a 10-point advantage over the opponent, the bout is stopped and the leader is declared as the winner by technical superiority. The total scores are totaled at the end of the stipulated six-minute period, and the wrestler with the maximum points wins. In case of a tie, the wrestler who has scored the last point is declared the winner. A competitor might also be declared a winner if the opponent does not turn up or is medically unfit to compete.

== Qualification ==
Sixteen quota places were available with each nation restricted to a maximum of one spot. Five quota places were awarded at the 2023 World Wrestling Championships, which took place from the 16th to 24th of September in Belgrade, Serbia. The finalists of each category in the four continental qualification tournaments (Asia, Europe, the Americas, and the joint Africa & Oceania) were awarded quota places. The remainder of the total quota was allocated at the 2024 World Wrestling Olympic Qualification Tournament, offering a minimum of three quota places.

== Schedule ==
All times are Central European Time (UTC+02:00)

| Date | Time | Event |
|---|---|---|
| 8 August 2024 | 11:30 | Qualification rounds |
| 8 August 2024 | 18:15 | Semifinals |
| 9 August 2024 | 11:00 | Repechage |
| 9 August 2024 | 19:30 | Finals |

== Results ==
Sixteen athletes qualified for the competition.

Legend

- F — Won by fall
- WO — Won by walkover

=== Main bracket ===
Round of 16
Rei Higuchi (JPN) | WO
Alireza Sarlak (IRI)
Darian Cruz (PUR) | 4^{F}
Gamal Mohamed (EGY) | 1
Aman Sehrawat (IND) | 10
Vladimir Egorov (MKD) | 0
Diamantino Iuna Fafé (GBS) | 6
Zelimkhan Abakarov (ALB) | 7
Meirambek Kartbay (KAZ) | 1
Bekzat Almaz Uulu (KGZ) | 4
Spencer Lee (USA) | 3
Zou Wanhao (CHN) | 2
Gulomjon Abdullaev (UZB) | 11
Aliabbas Rzazade (AZE) | 4
Roman Bravo-Young (MEX) | 3
Arsen Harutyunyan (ARM) | 13

Quarterfinals
Rei Higuchi (JPN) | 12
Darian Cruz (PUR) | 2
Aman Sehrawat (IND) | 12
Zelimkhan Abakarov (ALB) | 0
Bekzat Almaz Uulu (KGZ) | 2
Spencer Lee (USA) | 12
Gulomjon Abdullaev (UZB) | 12
Arsen Harutyunyan (ARM) | 5

Semifinals
Rei Higuchi (JPN) | 10
Aman Sehrawat (IND) | 0
Spencer Lee (USA) | 14
Gulomjon Abdullaev (UZB) | 4

Final
Rei Higuchi (JPN) | 4
Spencer Lee (USA) | 2

=== Repechage ===
Repechage
Alireza Sarlak (IRI)
Darian Cruz (PUR) | WO
Zou Wanhao (CHN) | 4
Bekzat Almaz Uulu (KGZ) | 7^{F}

Bronze medal matches
Darian Cruz (PUR) | 5
Aman Sehrawat (IND) | 13
Bekzat Almaz Uulu (KGZ) | 1
Gulomjon Abdullaev (UZB) | 5

== Final standing ==
| Rank | Athlete |
|---|---|
| 1st place, gold medalist(s) | Rei Higuchi (JPN) |
| 2nd place, silver medalist(s) | Spencer Lee (USA) |
| 3rd place, bronze medalist(s) | Aman Sehrawat (IND) |
| 3rd place, bronze medalist(s) | Gulomjon Abdullaev (UZB) |
| 5 | Darian Cruz (PUR) |
| 5 | Bekzat Almaz Uulu (KGZ) |
| 7 | Arsen Harutyunyan (ARM) |
| 8 | Zelimkhan Abakarov (ALB) |
| 9 | Diamantino Iuna Fafé (GBS) |
| 10 | Zou Wanhao (CHN) |
| 11 | Aliabbas Rzazade (AZE) |
| 12 | Roman Bravo-Young (MEX) |
| 13 | Meirambek Kartbay (KAZ) |
| 14 | Gamal Mohamed (EGY) |
| 15 | Vladimir Egorov (MKD) |
| LFO | Alireza Sarlak (IRI) |
