= 2023 Big Ten Wrestling Championships – 133 lbs =

133 pounds at the 2023 Big Ten Wrestling Championships
- Site: Crisler Center; Ann Arbor, Michigan
- Competitors: 14

Medalists
- 1st place, gold medalist(s): Roman Bravo-Young (Penn State)
- 2nd place, silver medalist(s): Aaron Nagao (Minnesota)
- 3rd place, bronze medalist(s): Lucas Byrd (Illinois)

The 133-pound competition at the 2023 Big Ten Wrestling Championships in Ann Arbor, Michigan, took place from March 4–5, 2023 at the Crisler Center.

The competition consisted of a triple-elimination tournament to determine the top ten wrestlers of the Big Ten's 133-pound weight class. The top nine wrestlers would qualify for the 2023 NCAA Division I Wrestling Championships.

== Preliminary seeds ==
The Big Ten announced the preliminary seeds on February 27, 2023.

Seed	Wrestler
1	Roman Bravo-Young (Penn State)
2	Jesse Mendez (Ohio State)
3	Lucas Byrd (Illinois)
4	Chris Cannon (Northwestern)
5	Dylan Ragusin (Michigan)
6	Aaron Nagao (Minnesota)
7	Joe Heilmann (Rutgers)
8	Brody Teske (Iowa)
9	RayVon Foley (Michigan State)
10	Taylor Lamont (Wisconsin)
11	Henry Porter (Indiana)
12	Kyle Burwick (Nebraska)
13	Dustin Norris (Purdue)
14	Jackson Cockrell (Maryland)

== Results ==
Legend

- F — Won by fall
- MF — Won by medical forfeit

=== Championship bracket ===
First Round
1	Roman Bravo-Young (PSU)
BYE
9	RayVon Foley (MSU)	1
8	Brody Teske (IOWA)	4
5	Dylan Ragusin (MICH)	10
12	Kyle Burwick (NEB)	4
13	Dustin Norris (PUR)	4
4	Chris Cannon (NU)	7
3	Lucas Byrd (ILL)	14^{F}
14	Jackson Cockrell (MD)	3
11	Henry Porter (IND)	2
6	Aaron Nagao (MINN)	10
7	Joe Heilmann (RUT)	5
10	Taylor Lamont (WIS)	2
BYE
2	Jesse Mendez (OSU)

Quarterfinals
1	Roman Bravo-Young (PSU)	13
8	Brody Teske (IOWA)	2
5	Dylan Ragusin (MICH)	5^{F}
4	Chris Cannon (NU)	1
3	Lucas Byrd (ILL)	2
6	Aaron Nagao (MINN)	4
7	Joe Heilmann (RUT)	0
2	Jesse Mendez (OSU)	4

Semifinals
1	Roman Bravo-Young (PSU)	8
5	Dylan Ragusin (MICH)	2
6	Aaron Nagao (MINN)	6
2	Jesse Mendez (OSU)	4

1st-Place Match
1	Roman Bravo-Young (PSU)	5
6	Aaron Nagao (MINN)	2

=== Consolation bracket ===
Consolation Round 1
BYE
9	RayVon Foley (MSU)
12	Kyle Burwick (NEB)	1
13	Dustin Norris (PUR)	3
14	Jackson Cockrell (MD)	0
11	Henry Porter (IND)	2^{F}
10	Taylor Lamont (WIS)
BYE

Consolation Round 2
9	RayVon Foley (MSU)	2
7	Joe Heilmann (RUT)	5
13	Dustin Norris (PUR)	0
3	Lucas Byrd (ILL)	8
11	Henry Porter (IND)	1
4	Chris Cannon (NU)	8
10	Taylor Lamont (WIS)	1
8	Brody Teske (IOWA)	4

Consolation Quarterfinals
7	Joe Heilmann (RUT)	0
3	Lucas Byrd (ILL)	8
4	Chris Cannon (NU)	9
8	Brody Teske (IOWA)	4
7th-Place Match
7	Joe Heilmann (RUT)	4
8	Brody Teske (IOWA)	8

Consolation Semifinals
3	Lucas Byrd (ILL)	6
5	Dylan Ragusin (MICH)	1
4	Chris Cannon (NU)	4
2	Jesse Mendez (OSU)	2
5th-Place Match
5	Dylan Ragusin (MICH)	5
2	Jesse Mendez (OSU)	3

3rd-Place Match
3	Lucas Byrd (ILL)	3
4	Chris Cannon (NU)	1

=== 9th-place bracket ===
9th-Place Quarterfinals
10	Taylor Lamont (WIS)
BYE
11	Henry Porter (IND)	6
14	Jackson Cockrell (MD)	2
13	Dustin Norris (PUR)	17
12	Kyle Burwick (NEB)	2
BYE
9	Rayvon Foley (MSU)

9th-Place Semifinals
10	Taylor Lamont (WIS)	7
11	Henry Porter (IND)	4
13	Dustin Norris (PUR)	2^{F}
9	Rayvon Foley (MSU)	0

9th-Place Match
10	Taylor Lamont (WIS)	3
13	Dustin Norris (PUR)	1

== Final standings ==
Note: Top-9 wrestlers qualify for the 2023 NCAA Division I Wrestling Championships.

Rank	Wrestler
1st place, gold medalist(s)	Roman Bravo-Young (Penn State)
2nd place, silver medalist(s)	Aaron Nagao (Minnesota)
3rd place, bronze medalist(s)	Lucas Byrd (Illinois)
4	Chris Cannon (Northwestern)
5	Dylan Ragusin (Michigan)
6	Jesse Mendez (Ohio State)
7	Brody Teske (Iowa)
8	Joe Heilmann (Rutgers)
9	Taylor Lamont (Wisconsin)
10	Dustin Norris (Purdue)
11	RayVon Foley (Michigan State)
11	Henry Porter (Indiana)
13	Kyle Burwick (Nebraska)
13	Jackson Cockrell (Maryland)
