= 2025 Ulaanbaatar Open =

- Host city: Ulaanbaatar, Mongolia
- Dates: 29 May-1 June 2025
- Stadium: Buyant Ukhaa Sport Palace

Champions
- Freestyle: Mongolia
- Greco-Roman: Kyrgyzstan
- Women: Mongolia

The 2025 Ulaanbaatar Open, was a wrestling event that took place in Ulaanbaatar, Mongolia between 29 May and 1 June 2025.It was the third of the ranking series of United World Wrestling in 2025. With an aim to reward wrestlers participating in Ranking Series tournaments, the United World Wrestling awarded prize money to the medal winners in all weight classes with a total prize money of 390,000 Swiss Francs. The gold medal winners at the four Ranking Series tournaments in 2023 will receive 1500 Swiss Francs with the silver medallists getting 750 Swiss Francs. The two bronze medallists will receive 500 Swiss Francs each.

== Ranking Series ==
Ranking Series Calendar 2025:

- 1st Ranking Series: 5-9 February, Croatia, Zagreb ⇒ 2025 Grand Prix Zagreb Open
- 2nd Ranking Series: 26 February-2 March, Tirana, Albania ⇒ 2025 Muhamet Malo Tournament
- 3rd Ranking Series: 29 May-1 June, Mongolia, Ulaanbaatar ⇒ 2025 Ulaanbaatar Open
- 4th Ranking Series: 17-20 July, Hungary, Budapest ⇒ 2025 Polyák Imre, Varga János & Kozma István Memorial Tournament

== Medal table ==
* Host nation (Mongolia)

Rank	Nation	Gold	Silver	Bronze	Total
1	Mongolia*	7	10	12	29
2	India	6	7	8	21
3	Turkey	5	3	5	13
4	Kyrgyzstan	4	2	6	12
5	Iran	4	2	0	6
–	United World Wrestling	3	3	4	10
6	Qatar	1	0	1	2
7	Mexico	0	1	0	1
7	South Korea	0	1	0	1
7	Tajikistan	0	1	0	1
Totals (9 entries)		30	30	36	96

== Team ranking ==
Rank	Men's freestyle		Men's Greco-Roman		Women's freestyle	
Rank	Team	Points	Team	Points	Team	Points
1	Mongolia	177	Kyrgyzstan	170	Mongolia	207
2	India	129	Turkey	167	India	202
3	Iran	95	India	163	Turkey	55
4	Turkey	90	Mongolia	102	Brazil	12
5	Kyrgyzstan	71	Qatar	40	Jordan	10

== Medal overview ==
=== Men's freestyle ===
Event	Gold	Silver	Bronze
57 kg	Batkhuyagiin Mönkh-Erdene; Mongolia	Roman Bravo-Young; Mexico	Aman Sehrawat; India
57 kg	Batkhuyagiin Mönkh-Erdene; Mongolia	Roman Bravo-Young; Mexico	Mönkh-Erdeniin Davaabandi; Mongolia
61 kg	Tümenbilegiin Tüvshintulga; Mongolia	Udit Kumar; India	Anzor Mazhidov; United World Wrestling
61 kg	Tümenbilegiin Tüvshintulga; Mongolia	Udit Kumar; India	Bekbolot Myrzanazar Uulu; Kyrgyzstan
65 kg	Taiyrbek Zhumashbek Uulu; Kyrgyzstan	Dzhambulat Kizinov; United World Wrestling	Ahmet Duman; Turkey
65 kg	Taiyrbek Zhumashbek Uulu; Kyrgyzstan	Dzhambulat Kizinov; United World Wrestling	Ikromzhon Khadzhimurodov; Kyrgyzstan
70 kg	Konstantin Kaprynov; United World Wrestling	Ali Akbar Fazli; Iran	Zagir Shakhiev; United World Wrestling
70 kg	Konstantin Kaprynov; United World Wrestling	Ali Akbar Fazli; Iran	Tömör-Ochiryn Tulga; Mongolia
74 kg	Younes Emami; Iran	Amir Mohammad Yazdani; Iran	Orozobek Toktomambetov; Kyrgyzstan
74 kg	Younes Emami; Iran	Amir Mohammad Yazdani; Iran	Jaideep Narwal; India
79 kg	Fariborz Babaei; Iran	Magomet Evloev; Tajikistan	Amit Chhikara; India
86 kg	Osman Göçen; Turkey	Bat-Erdeniin Byambadorj; Mongolia	Naadambatyn Batbilgüün; Mongolia
92 kg	Askhab Saadulaev; United World Wrestling	Deepak Punia; India	Byambasürengiin Bat-Erdene; Mongolia
97 kg	Ahmad Bazri; Iran	Ganbaataryn Gankhuyag; Mongolia	Vicky Hooda; India
97 kg	Ahmad Bazri; Iran	Ganbaataryn Gankhuyag; Mongolia	Resul Güne; Turkey
125 kg	Mönkhtöriin Lkhagvagerel; Mongolia	Dzianis Khramiankou; United World Wrestling	Hakan Büyükçıngıl; Turkey

=== Men's Greco-Roman ===
Event	Gold	Silver	Bronze
55 kg	Anil Mor; India	Ulan Muratbek Uulu; Kyrgyzstan	Mönkh-Erdeniin Davaabandi; Mongolia
60 kg	Enes Başar; Turkey	Suraj Vashisht; India	Akyl Sulaimanov; Kyrgyzstan
63 kg	Kerem Kamal; Turkey	Chung Han-jae; South Korea	Aref Mohammadi; Qatar
67 kg	Razzak Beishekeev; Kyrgyzstan	Murat Fırat; Turkey	Neeraj Chhikara; India
72 kg	Danial Sohrabi; Iran	Mehmet Mustafa Şahin; Turkey	Yryskeldi Khamzaev; Kyrgyzstan
77 kg	Ahmet Yılmaz; Turkey	Yryskeldi Maksatbek Uulu; Kyrgyzstan	Nishant Phogat; India
82 kg	Shahin Badaghi; Qatar	Prince; India	Burhan Akbudak; Turkey
87 kg	Asan Zhanyshov; Kyrgyzstan	Tsogtbaataryn Batbayar; Mongolia	Karan Kamboj; India
97 kg	Uzur Dzhuzupbekov; Kyrgyzstan	Nitesh Siwach; India	Ganbaataryn Gankhuyag; Mongolia
130 kg	Hamza Bakır; Turkey	Batbayaryn Nambardagva; Mongolia	Erlan Manatbekov; Kyrgyzstan

=== Women's freestyle ===
Event	Gold	Silver	Bronze
50 kg	Natalia Pudova; United World Wrestling	Evin Demirhan Yavuz; Turkey	Neelam Sirohi; India
53 kg	Antim Panghal; India	Natalia Malysheva; United World Wrestling	Chinboldyn Otgontuyaa; Mongolia
55 kg	Batkhuyagiin Khulan; Mongolia	Pushpa Yadav; India	Bayanmönkhiin Otgontuyaa; Mongolia
57 kg	Neha Sharma; India	Khürelkhüügiin Bolortuyaa; Mongolia	Elvira Süleyman Kamaloğlu; Turkey
59 kg	Muskan Nandal; India	Togtokhyn Altjin; Mongolia	Enkhbatyn Gantuyaa; Mongolia
62 kg	Pürevdorjiin Orkhon; Mongolia	Sükheegiin Tserenchimed; Mongolia	Alina Kasabieva; United World Wrestling
65 kg	Tüvshinjargalyn Enkhjin; Mongolia	Shiksha Kharb; India	Nyamsürengiin Narkhajid; Mongolia
68 kg	Enkhsaikhany Delgermaa; Mongolia	Batsükhiin Gantsetseg; Mongolia	Myagmarsürengiin Batsüren; Mongolia
72 kg	Harshita Mor; India	Zorigtyn Bolortungalag; Mongolia	Kristina Bratchikova; United World Wrestling
76 kg	Reetika Hooda; India	Enkh-Amaryn Davaanasan; Mongolia	Gan-Ochiryn Urtnasan; Mongolia

== Participating nations ==
180 wrestlers from 13 countries:

1. Australia (1)
2. Brazil (1)
3. India (31)
4. Iran (9)
5. Jordan (1)
6. Kyrgyzstan (18)
7. South Korea (5)
8. Mexico (1)
9. Mongolia (72) (Host)
10. Qatar (2)
11. Singapore (1)
12. Tajikistan (1)
13. Turkey (18)
14. United World Wrestling (Russia+Belarus) (19)

== Results ==
=== Men's freestyle ===
==== Men's freestyle 57 kg ====
Round of 16
Almaz Smanbekov (KGZ)	12
Sarantuyaagiin Jigüür (MGL)	2
Lev Pavlov (UWW)	0
Rahul Deswal (IND)	5

Quarterfinals
Aman Sehrawat (IND)	11
Almaz Smanbekov (KGZ)	1
Roman Bravo-Young (MEX)	12
Bekir Keser (TUR)	2
Batkhuyagiin Mönkh-Erdene (MGL)	7
Mönkh-Erdeniin Davaabandi (MGL)	2
Rahul Deswal (IND)	7
Abdymalik Karachov (KGZ)	0

Semifinals
Aman Sehrawat (IND)	11
Roman Bravo-Young (MEX)	14^{F}
Batkhuyagiin Mönkh-Erdene (MGL)	6
Rahul Deswal (IND)	3

Final
Roman Bravo-Young (MEX)	3
Batkhuyagiin Mönkh-Erdene (MGL)	6

Bronze medal match
Bekir Keser (TUR)	2
Aman Sehrawat (IND)	12
Mönkh-Erdeniin Davaabandi (MGL)	9
Rahul Deswal (IND)	7

==== Men's freestyle 61 kg ====
Round of 16
Anzor Mazhidov (UWW)	7
Dzmitry Shamela (UWW)	7
Georgii Okorokov (AUS)	6
Bekbolot Myrzanazar Uulu (KGZ)	17

Quarterfinals
Tümenbilegiin Tüvshintulga (MGL)	4
Anzor Mazhidov (UWW)	0
Zandanbudyn Zanabazar (MGL)	8
Namsrain Ganbayar (MGL)	0
Bekzat Almaz Uulu (KGZ)	7
Artem Gobaev (UWW)	7
Bekbolot Myrzanazar Uulu (KGZ)	0
Udit Kumar (IND)	11

Semifinals
Tümenbilegiin Tüvshintulga (MGL)	9
Zandanbudyn Zanabazar (MGL)	1
Artem Gobaev (UWW)	1
Udit Kumar (IND)	2

Final
Tümenbilegiin Tüvshintulga (MGL)	6
Udit Kumar (IND)	4

Bronze medal match
Anzor Mazhidov (UWW)	6^{F}
Zandanbudyn Zanabazar (MGL)	3
Bekbolot Myrzanazar Uulu (KGZ)	3^{F}
Artem Gobaev (UWW)	0

==== Men's freestyle 65 kg ====
Round of 16
Taiyrbek Zhumashbek Uulu (KGZ)	3
Yun Jun-sik (KOR)	2

Quarterfinals
Byambasürengiin Zeneemeder (MGL)	1
Taiyrbek Zhumashbek Uulu (KGZ)	9
Rohit Singh (IND)	0
Ahmet Duman (TUR)	13
Ikromzhon Khadzhimurodov (KGZ)	3^{F}
Tseveensürengiin Tsogbadrakh (MGL)	3
Dzhambulat Kizinov (UWW)	6
Davaanyamyn Törbayar (MGL)	3

Semifinals
Taiyrbek Zhumashbek Uulu (KGZ)	3
Ahmet Duman (TUR)	3
Ikromzhon Khadzhimurodov (KGZ)	3
Dzhambulat Kizinov (UWW)	8

Final
Taiyrbek Zhumashbek Uulu (KGZ)	6
Dzhambulat Kizinov (UWW)	0

Repechage round 1
Yun Jun-sik (KOR)	6
Byambasürengiin Zeneemeder (MGL)	5

Bronze medal match
Yun Jun-sik (KOR)	5
Ahmet Duman (TUR)	10
Davaanyamyn Törbayar (MGL)	2
Ikromzhon Khadzhimurodov (KGZ)	12

==== Men's freestyle 70 kg ====
Round of 16
Konstantin Kaprynov (UWW)	5
Zagir Shakhiev (UWW)	1

Quarterfinals
Jeon Jin-su (KOR)	0
Konstantin Kaprynov (UWW)	6
Altangereliin Ankh-Erdene (MGL)	4
Ösökhbayaryn Baatarkhüü (MGL)	4
Vishal Kaliramana (IND)	2
Mohammad-Ali Amouzad (IRI)	3
Tömör-Ochiryn Tulga (MGL)	1
Ali Akbar Fazli (IRI)	5

Semifinals
Konstantin Kaprynov (UWW)	10
Ösökhbayaryn Baatarkhüü (MGL)	0
Mohammad-Ali Amouzad (IRI)	6
Ali Akbar Fazli (IRI)	10

Final
Konstantin Kaprynov (UWW)	6
Ali Akbar Fazli (IRI)	0

Repechage round 1
Zagir Shakhiev (UWW)	11
Jeon Jin-su (KOR)	1

Bronze medal match
Zagir Shakhiev (UWW)	17
Ösökhbayaryn Baatarkhüü (MGL)	6
Tömör-Ochiryn Tulga (MGL)	7
Mohammad-Ali Amouzad (IRI)	5

==== Men's freestyle 74 kg ====
Round of 16
Shinebayaryn Deleg (MGL)	12
Batsükhiin Batbayar (MGL)	1

Quarterfinals
Orozobek Toktomambetov (KGZ)	10
Shinebayaryn Deleg (MGL)	0
Soner Demirtaş (TUR)
Amir Mohammad Yazdani (IRI)	WO
Erdenebatyn Tögsjargal (MGL)	1
Younes Emami (IRI)	5^{F}
Hossein Abouzari (IRI)	5
Jaideep Narwal (IND)	8^{F}

Semifinals
Orozobek Toktomambetov (KGZ)	6
Amir Mohammad Yazdani (IRI)	6
Younes Emami (IRI)	5
Jaideep Narwal (IND)	3

Final
Amir Mohammad Yazdani (IRI)	3
Younes Emami (IRI)	4

Bronze medal match
Soner Demirtaş (TUR)
Orozobek Toktomambetov (KGZ)	WO
Erdenebatyn Tögsjargal (MGL)	4
Jaideep Narwal (IND)	11^{F}

==== Men's freestyle 79 kg ====
Pos	Athlete	Pld	W	L	CP	TP	TJK	IND	MGL
1	Magomet Evloev (TJK)	2	2	0	6	12	—	6–0	6–0
2	Amit Chhikara (IND)	2	1	1	5	4	0–3 PO	—	4–2 Fall
3	Olonbayaryn Süldkhüü (MGL)	2	0	2	0	2	0–3 PO	0–5 FA	—

Source: UWW

Pos	Athlete	Pld	W	L	CP	TP	IRI	MGL	MGL
1	Fariborz Babaei (IRI)	2	2	0	9	17	—	11–0	6–0 Fall
2	Javkhlankhüügiin Dalaitseren (MGL)	2	1	1	4	13	0–4 SU	—	13–0
3	Tsend-Ayuushiin Damdinpürev (MGL)	2	0	2	0	0	0–5 FA	0–4 SU	—

Source: UWW

Semifinals
Magomet Evloev (TJK)	8^{F}
Javkhlankhüügiin Dalaitseren (MGL)	0
Fariborz Babaei (IRI)	9
Amit Chhikara (IND)	3

Final
Magomet Evloev (TJK)	0
Fariborz Babaei (IRI)	4
Third place
Javkhlankhüügiin Dalaitseren (MGL)	14
Amit Chhikara (IND)	14^{F}

==== Men's freestyle 86 kg ====
Pos	Athlete	Pld	W	L	CP	TP	MGL	MGL	IND	KOR
1	Naadambatyn Batbilgüün (MGL)	3	3	0	9	21	—	2–1	14–11	5–1
2	Gan-Ochiryn Dayanbileg (MGL)	3	2	1	10	20	1–3 PO1	—	7–2 Fall	12–2
3	Ashish Sehrawat (IND)	3	1	2	5	24	1–3 PO1	0–5 FA	—	11–1
4	Hwang Tae-gyu (KOR)	3	0	3	3	4	1–3 PO1	1–4 SU1	1–4 SU1	—

Source: UWW

Pos	Athlete	Pld	W	L	CP	TP	TUR	MGL	KGZ
1	Osman Göçen (TUR)	2	2	0	7	24	—	16–5	8–0
2	Bat-Erdeniin Byambadorj (MGL)	2	1	1	4	15	1–4 SU1	—	10–6
3	Bekzat Rakhimov (KGZ)	2	0	2	1	6	0–3 PO	1–3 PO1	—

Source: UWW

Semifinals
Naadambatyn Batbilgüün (MGL)	0
Bat-Erdeniin Byambadorj (MGL)	3^{F}
Osman Göçen (TUR)	4^{F}
Gan-Ochiryn Dayanbileg (MGL)	0

Final
Bat-Erdeniin Byambadorj (MGL)	0
Osman Göçen (TUR)	7
Bronze medal
Naadambatyn Batbilgüün (MGL)	10
Gan-Ochiryn Dayanbileg (MGL)	0

==== Men's freestyle 92 kg ====
Pos	Athlete	Pld	W	L	CP	TP	UWW	IND	MGL	MGL	MGL
1	Askhab Saadulaev (UWW)	4	4	0	17	22	—	WO	7–2	5–0 Fall	10–0
2	Deepak Punia (IND)	4	3	1	12	23	0–5 IN	—	4–1	10–0	9–0 Fall
3	Byambasürengiin Bat-Erdene (MGL)	4	2	2	10	8	1–3 PO1	1–3 PO1	—	5–0	WO
4	Tömörbaataryn Demchigdorj (MGL)	4	1	3	4	10	0–5 FA	0–4 SU	0–3 PO	—	10–0
—	Dembereliin Delgerdalai (MGL)	4	0	4	0	0	0–4 SU	0–5 FA	0–5 FO	0–4 SU	—

Source: UWW

==== Men's freestyle 97 kg ====
Round of 16
Kim Pu-reun (KOR)	0
Vicky Hooda (IND)	10
Irbeg Tavgazov (UWW)	5
Demüüliin Sarantsogt (MGL)	0

Quarterfinals
Ganbayaryn Tüvshintör (MGL)	0
Vicky Hooda (IND)	10
Uladzislau Kazlou (UWW)	0
Ganbaataryn Gankhuyag (MGL)	5
Bady-Maadyr Samdan (UWW)	3
Resul Güne (TUR)	8^{F}
Irbeg Tavgazov (UWW)	0
Ahmad Bazri (IRI)	5

Semifinals
Vicky Hooda (IND)	2
Ganbaataryn Gankhuyag (MGL)	4
Resul Güne (TUR)	0
Ahmad Bazri (IRI)	8

Final
Ganbaataryn Gankhuyag (MGL)	0
Ahmad Bazri (IRI)	8

Bronze medal match
Uladzislau Kazlou (UWW)	0
Vicky Hooda (IND)	5
Irbeg Tavgazov (UWW)	2
Resul Güne (TUR)	4

==== Men's freestyle 125 kg ====
Pos	Athlete	Pld	W	L	CP	TP	MGL	UWW	MGL
1	Mönkhtöriin Lkhagvagerel (MGL)	2	2	0	6	15	—	9–2	6–2
2	Dzianis Khramiankou (UWW)	2	1	1	3	14	1–3 PO1	—	12–7
3	Darmaabazaryn Narantulga (MGL)	2	0	2	2	9	1–3 PO1	1–3 PO1	—

Source: UWW

Pos	Athlete	Pld	W	L	CP	TP	TUR	MGL	IND
1	Hakan Büyükçıngıl (TUR)	2	2	0	9	17	—	6–0 Fall	11–1
2	Batbayaryn Nambardagva (MGL)	2	1	1	3	6	0–5 FA	—	6–2
3	Dinesh Dhankhar (IND)	2	0	2	2	3	1–4 SU1	1–3 PO1	—

Source: UWW

Semifinals
Mönkhtöriin Lkhagvagerel (MGL)	5
Batbayaryn Nambardagva (MGL)	1
Hakan Büyükçıngıl (TUR)	1
Dzianis Khramiankou (UWW)	12

Final
Mönkhtöriin Lkhagvagerel (MGL)	5
Dzianis Khramiankou (UWW)	0
Third place
Batbayaryn Nambardagva (MGL)	1
Hakan Büyükçıngıl (TUR)	11

=== Men's Greco-Roman ===
==== Men's Greco-Roman 55 kg ====
Pos	Athlete	Pld	W	L	CP	TP	IND	KGZ	MGL	MGL	SGP
1	Anil Mor (IND)	4	4	0	17	32	—	4–3 Fall	11–0	8–0	9–0
2	Ulan Muratbek Uulu (KGZ)	4	3	1	13	23	0–5 FA	—	8–0	4–0 Fall	8–0
3	Mönkh-Erdeniin Davaabandi (MGL)	4	2	2	8	17	0–4 SU	0–4 SU	—	8–0	9–0
4	Mönkhzayaagiin Sumiyaabazar (MGL)	4	1	3	4	10	0–4 SU	0–5 FA	0–4 SU	—	10–2'
5	Alexander Cuevas (SGP)	4	0	4	1	2	0–4 SU	0–4 SU	0–4 SU	1–4 SU1	—

Source: UWW

==== Men's Greco-Roman 60 kg ====
Pos	Athlete	Pld	W	L	CP	TP	TUR	IND	KGZ	KGZ	MGL
1	Enes Başar (TUR)	4	4	0	15	42	—	8–0	16–5	8–3	10–2
2	Suraj Vashisht (IND)	4	3	1	10	22	0–4 SU	—	5–0	9–0	8–5
3	Akyl Sulaimanov (KGZ)	4	2	2	8	21	1–4 SU1	0–3 PO	—	9–0	7–3
4	Kurmanbek Zhaparov (KGZ)	4	1	3	4	9	1–3 PO1	0–4 SU	0–4 SU	—	6–4'
5	Namsrain Ganbayar (MGL)	4	0	4	4	14	1–4 SU1	1–3 PO1	1–3 PO1	1–3 PO1	—

Source: UWW

==== Men's Greco-Roman 63 kg ====
Pos	Athlete	Pld	W	L	CP	TP	TUR	KOR	KGZ
1	Kerem Kamal (TUR)	2	2	0	6	8	—	4–2	4–1
2	Chung Han-jae (KOR)	2	1	1	5	11	1–3 PO1	—	9–1
3	Doolotbek Choibekov (KGZ)	2	0	2	2	2	1–3 PO1	1–4 SU1	—

Source: UWW

Pos	Athlete	Pld	W	L	CP	TP	IRI	QAT	IND
1	Mohammad Mehdi Keshtkar (IRI)	2	2	0	6	8	—	2–2	6–5
2	Aref Mohammadi (QAT)	2	1	1	5	10	1–3 PO1	—	8–0
3	Chetan Sharma (IND)	2	0	2	1	5	1–3 PO1	0–4 SU	—

Source: UWW

Semifinals
Kerem Kamal (TUR)	6
Aref Mohammadi (QAT)	3
Mohammad Mehdi Keshtkar (IRI)	1
Chung Han-jae (KOR)	2

Final
Kerem Kamal (TUR)	6
Chung Han-jae (KOR)	6
Third place
Aref Mohammadi (QAT)	6
Mohammad Mehdi Keshtkar (IRI)	1

==== Men's Greco-Roman 67 kg ====
Pos	Athlete	Pld	W	L	CP	TP	KGZ	TUR	IND
1	Razzak Beishekeev (KGZ)	2	2	0	7	14	—	5–1	9–0
2	Murat Fırat (TUR)	2	1	1	5	9	1–3 PO1	—	8–0
3	Neeraj Chhikara (IND)	2	0	2	0	0	0–4 SU	0–4 SU	—

Source: UWW

==== Men's Greco-Roman 72 kg ====
Pos	Athlete	Pld	W	L	CP	TP	IRI	TUR	KGZ	IND	MGL
1	Danial Sohrabi (IRI)	4	4	0	16	29	—	3–1	10–1	8–0 Fall	8–0
2	Mehmet Mustafa Şahin (TUR)	4	3	1	12	24	1–3 PO1	—	9–0	3–1	11–2
3	Yryskeldi Khamzaev (KGZ)	4	2	2	8	17	1–4 SU1	0–4 SU	—	8–3	8–0
4	Ankit Gulia (IND)	4	1	3	7	4	0–5 FA	1–3 PO1	1–3 PO1	—	WO
5	Batsaikhany Zandanbat (MGL)	4	0	4	1	2	0–4 SU	1–4 SU1	0–4 SU	0–5 IN	—

Source: UWW

==== Men's Greco-Roman 77 kg ====
Pos	Athlete	Pld	W	L	CP	TP	IND	MGL	MGL
1	Nishant Phogat (IND)	2	2	0	6	9	—	3–1	6–4
2	Zandanbudyn Sumiyaabazar (MGL)	2	1	1	6	5	1–3 PO1	—	4–1 Fall
3	Nyam-Erdeniin Orgil (MGL)	2	0	2	1	5	1–3 PO1	0–5 FA	—

Source: UWW

Pos	Athlete	Pld	W	L	CP	TP	TUR	KGZ	MGL
1	Ahmet Yılmaz (TUR)	2	2	0	8	21	—	11–3	10–1
2	Yryskeldi Maksatbek Uulu (KGZ)	2	1	1	5	12	1–4 SU1	—	9–0
3	Dashjamtsiin Lkhagvasüren (MGL)	2	0	2	1	1	1–4 SU1	0–4 SU	—

Source: UWW

Semifinals
Nishant Phogat (IND)	0
Yryskeldi Maksatbek Uulu (KGZ)	8
Ahmet Yılmaz (TUR)	11
Zandanbudyn Sumiyaabazar (MGL)	0

Final
Yryskeldi Maksatbek Uulu (KGZ)	1
Ahmet Yılmaz (TUR)	5
Third place
Nishant Phogat (IND)	11
Zandanbudyn Sumiyaabazar (MGL)	0

==== Men's Greco-Roman 82 kg ====
Pos	Athlete	Pld	W	L	CP	TP	KGZ	TUR	IND
1	Shahin Badaghi (QAT)	2	2	0	9	9	—	9–0	WO
2	Prince (IND)	2	1	1	5	0	0–4 SU	—	WO
3	Burhan Akbudak (TUR)	2	0	2	0	0	0–5 IN	0–5 IN	—

Source: UWW

==== Men's Greco-Roman 87 kg ====
Pos	Athlete	Pld	W	L	CP	TP	KGZ	MGL	IND	TUR
1	Asan Zhanyshov (KGZ)	3	3	0	13	17	—	8–0	9–0	WO
2	Tsogtbaataryn Batbayar (MGL)	3	2	1	10	8	0–4 SU	—	8–2 Fall	WO
3	Karan Kamboj (IND)	3	1	2	5	7	0–4 SU	0–5 FA	—	5–5 Ret
4	Alperen Berber (TUR)	3	0	3	0	5	0–5 IN	0–5 IN	0–5 IN	—

Source: UWW

==== Men's Greco-Roman 97 kg ====
Pos	Athlete	Pld	W	L	CP	TP	KGZ	IND	MGL	MGL
1	Uzur Dzhuzupbekov (KGZ)	3	3	0	10	24	—	5–4	10–6	9–1
2	Nitesh Siwach (IND)	3	2	1	8	18	1–3 PO1	—	5–3	9–0
3	Ganbaataryn Gankhuyag (MGL)	3	1	2	5	18	1–3 PO1	1–3 PO1	—	9–7
4	Byambasürengiin Bat-Erdene (MGL)	3	0	3	2	8	1–4 SU1	0–4 SU	1–3 PO1	—

Source: UWW

==== Men's Greco-Roman 130 kg ====
Pos	Athlete	Pld	W	L	CP	TP	TUR	MGL	KGZ	IND	MGL
1	Hamza Bakır (TUR)	4	4	0	16	33	—	8–0	9–1	8–0	8–0
2	Batbayaryn Nambardagva (MGL)	4	3	1	10	21	0–4 SU	—	6–1	7–0	8–0
3	Erlan Manatbekov (KGZ)	4	2	2	11	15	1–4 SU1	1–3 PO1	—	9–0	4–0 Fall
4	Prem Saroha (IND)	4	1	3	3	4	0–4 SU	0–3 PO	0–4 SU	—	4–0
5	Batbayaryn Törbat (MGL)	4	0	4	0	0	0–4 SU	0–4 SU	0–5 FA	0–3 PO	—

Source: UWW

=== Women's freestyle ===
==== Women's freestyle 50 kg ====
Pos	Athlete	Pld	W	L	CP	TP	TUR	MGL	MGL	MGL
1	Evin Demirhan Yavuz (TUR)	3	3	0	11	16	—	4–1	4–1	8–7 Fall
2	Byambasürengiin Mönkhnar (MGL)	3	2	1	7	11	1–3 PO1	—	7–4	3–3
3	Ganbatyn Oyundari (MGL)	3	1	2	7	5	1–3 PO1	1–3 PO1	—	WO
4	Mönkhbatyn Mönkhgerel (MGL)	3	0	3	1	10	0–5 FA	1–3 PO1	0–5 IN	—

Source: UWW

Pos	Athlete	Pld	W	L	CP	TP	UWW	IND	UWW
1	Natalia Pudova (UWW)	2	2	0	7	18	—	6–5	12–1
2	Neelam Sirohi (IND)	2	1	1	4	11	1–3 PO1	—	6–0
3	Aiana Ukheeva (UWW)	2	0	2	1	1	1–4 SU1	0–3 PO	—

Source: UWW

Semifinals
Evin Demirhan Yavuz (TUR)	8^{F}
Neelam Sirohi (IND)	5
Natalia Pudova (UWW)	4^{F}
Byambasürengiin Mönkhnar (MGL)	2

Final
Evin Demirhan Yavuz (TUR)	6
Natalia Pudova (UWW)	7
Bronze medal
Neelam Sirohi (IND)	9
Byambasürengiin Mönkhnar (MGL)	1

==== Women's freestyle 53 kg ====
Pos	Athlete	Pld	W	L	CP	TP	IND	UWW	MGL
1	Antim Panghal (IND)	2	2	0	9	17	—	11–0	6–0 Fall
2	Natalia Malysheva (UWW)	2	1	1	3	3	0–4 SU	—	3–0
3	Tsogt-Ochiryn Namuuntsetseg (MGL)	2	0	2	0	0	0–5 FA	0–3 PO	—

Source: UWW

Pos	Athlete	Pld	W	L	CP	TP	MGL	MGL	TUR
1	Chinboldyn Otgontuyaa (MGL)	2	2	0	10	19	—	4–0 Fall	15–7 Fall
2	Odonchimegiin Ariunzayaa (MGL)	2	1	1	4	11	0–5 FA	—	11–0
3	Aysun Erge (TUR)	2	0	2	0	7	0–5 FA	0–4 SU	—

Source: UWW

Semifinals
Antim Panghal (IND)	10
Odonchimegiin Ariunzayaa (MGL)	0
Chinboldyn Otgontuyaa (MGL)	4
Natalia Malysheva (UWW)	11

Final
Antim Panghal (IND)	10
Natalia Malysheva (UWW)	0
Third place
Odonchimegiin Ariunzayaa (MGL)	2
Chinboldyn Otgontuyaa (MGL)	5

==== Women's freestyle 55 kg ====
Pos	Athlete	Pld	W	L	CP	TP	KGZ	IND	MGL	MGL
1	Batkhuyagiin Khulan (MGL)	3	3	0	13	15	—	10–0 Fall	5–0	WO
2	Pushpa Yadav (IND)	3	2	1	8	21	0–5 FA	—	10–0	11–0
3	Bayanmönkhiin Otgontuyaa (MGL)	3	1	2	3	11	0–3 PO	0–4 SU	—	11–2
4	Bolormaagiin Dölgöön (MGL)	3	0	3	1	2	0–5 IN	0–4 SU	1–3 PO1	—

Source: UWW

==== Women's freestyle 57 kg ====
Pos	Athlete	Pld	W	L	CP	TP	MGL	BRA	MGL
1	Khürelkhüügiin Bolortuyaa (MGL)	2	2	0	10	13	—	10–0 Fall	3–3 Fall
2	Ana França (BRA)	2	1	1	3	2	0–5 FA	—	2–1
3	Baljinnyamyn Enkhtüvshin (MGL)	2	0	2	1	4	0–5 FA	1–3 PO1	—

Source: UWW

Pos	Athlete	Pld	W	L	CP	TP	IND	TUR	MGL
1	Neha Sangwan (IND)	2	2	0	8	13	—	7–4	6–0 Fall
2	Elvira Süleyman Kamaloğlu (TUR)	2	1	1	5	19	1–3 PO1	—	15–5
3	Ürjingiin Mönkhchimeg (MGL)	2	0	2	1	5	0–5 FA	1–4 SU1	—

Source: UWW

Semifinals
Khürelkhüügiin Bolortuyaa (MGL)	4
Elvira Süleyman Kamaloğlu (TUR)	0
Neha Sangwan (IND)	11
Ana França (BRA)	0

Final
Khürelkhüügiin Bolortuyaa (MGL)	0
Neha Sangwan (IND)	4
Third place
Elvira Süleyman Kamaloğlu (TUR)	7^{F}
Ana França (BRA)	2

==== Women's freestyle 59 kg ====
Pos	Athlete	Pld	W	L	CP	TP	IND	MGL	MGL	MGL	TUR
1	Muskan Nandal (IND)	4	4	0	14	35	—	9–0	8–2	13–5 Fall	5–4
2	Togtokhyn Altjin (MGL)	4	3	1	13	10	0–3 PO	—	6–1	2–0 Fall	2–0 Fall
3	Enkhbatyn Gantuyaa (MGL)	4	2	2	9	20	1–3 PO1	1–3 PO1	—	12–1	5–2
4	Batkhuyagiin Anudari (MGL)	4	1	3	4	12	0–5 FA	0–5 FA	1–4 SU1	—	6–6
5	Bediha Gün (TUR)	4	0	4	3	12	1–3 PO1	0–5 FA	1–3 PO1	1–3 PO1	—

Source: UWW

==== Women's freestyle 62 kg ====
Pos	Athlete	Pld	W	L	CP	TP	MGL	UWW	IND
1	Pürevdorjiin Orkhon (MGL)	2	1	1	5	7	—	0–10	7–1 Fall
2	Alina Kasabieva (UWW)	2	1	1	4	10	4–0 SU	—	0–5
3	Manisha Bhanwala (IND)	2	1	1	3	6	0–5 FA	3–0 PO	—

Source: UWW

Pos	Athlete	Pld	W	L	CP	TP	MGL	UWW	MGL
1	Sükheegiin Tserenchimed (MGL)	2	2	0	8	21	—	11–0	10–0
2	Ekaterina Koshkina (UWW)	2	1	1	5	8	0–4 SU	—	8–0 Fall
3	Erdenebilegiin Saruul (MGL)	2	0	2	0	0	0–4 SU	0–5 FA	—

Source: UWW

Semifinals
Pürevdorjiin Orkhon (MGL)	15
Ekaterina Koshkina (UWW)	11
Sükheegiin Tserenchimed (MGL)	5^{F}
Alina Kasabieva (UWW)	5

Final
Pürevdorjiin Orkhon (MGL)	11
Sükheegiin Tserenchimed (MGL)	2
Third place
Ekaterina Koshkina (UWW)
Alina Kasabieva (UWW)	WO

==== Women's freestyle 65 kg ====
Pos	Athlete	Pld	W	L	CP	TP	MGL	IND	MGL	MGL	UWW
1	Tüvshinjargalyn Enkhjin (MGL)	4	4	0	18	23	—	4–0 Fall	4–0 Fall	6–0 Fall	9–2
2	Shiksha Kharb (IND)	4	3	1	11	28	0–5 FA	—	7–2	10–0	11–0
3	Nyamsürengiin Narkhajid (MGL)	4	2	2	8	19	0–5 FA	1–3 PO1	—	7–1	10–0
4	Erdene-Ochiryn Odgerel (MGL)	4	1	3	6	1	0–5 FA	0–4 SU	1–3 PO1	—	WO
5	Valeria Dondupova (UWW)	4	0	4	1	2	1–3 PO1	0–4 SU	0–4 SU	0–5 IN	—

Source: UWW

==== Women's freestyle 68 kg ====
Pos	Athlete	Pld	W	L	CP	TP	MGL	MGL	MGL	IND	JOR
1	Enkhsaikhany Delgermaa (MGL)	4	4	0	15	37	—	7–0	10–0	10–0	10–0
2	Batsükhiin Gantsetseg (MGL)	4	3	1	13	36	0–3 PO	—	10–0	16–3	10–0 Fall
3	Myagmarsürengiin Batsüren (MGL)	4	2	2	9	17	0–4 SU	0–4 SU	—	6–5 Fall	11–0
4	Monika Sheoran (IND)	4	1	3	6	16	0–4 SU	1–4 SU1	0–5 FA	—	8–0 Fall
5	Balqis Taaibin (JOR)	4	0	4	0	0	0–4 SU	0–5 FA	0–4 SU	0–5 FA	—

Source: UWW

==== Women's freestyle 72 kg ====
Pos	Athlete	Pld	W	L	CP	TP	IND	MGL	UWW	MGL	MGL
1	Harshita Mor (IND)	4	4	0	15	37	—	13–0 Fall	11–0	14–4	WO
2	Zorigtyn Bolortungalag (MGL)	4	3	1	13	36	0–5 FA	—	8–2	2–0 Fall	WO
3	Kristina Bratchikova (UWW)	4	2	2	9	17	0–4 SU	1–3 PO1	—	6–3 Fall	WO
4	Dorjsürengiin Tsogzolmaa (MGL)	4	1	3	6	16	1–4 SU1	0–5 FA	0–5 FA	—	WO
—	Byambasürengiin Naidansüren (MGL)	4	0	4	0	0	0–5 FO	0–5 FO	0–5 FO	0–5 FO	—

Source: UWW

==== Women's freestyle 76 kg ====
Pos	Athlete	Pld	W	L	CP	TP	IND	MGL	MGL	MGL
1	Reetika Hooda (IND)	3	3	0	11	18	—	5–2	4–0	9–1 Fall
2	Enkh-Amaryn Davaanasan (MGL)	3	2	1	9	12	1–3 PO1	—	4–1	6–2 Fall
3	Gan-Ochiryn Urtnasan (MGL)	3	1	2	6	10	0–3 PO	1–3 PO1	—	9–2 Fall
4	Otgonbatyn Tselmüün (MGL)	3	0	3	0	5	0–5 FA	0–5 FA	0–5 FA	—

Source: UWW
