= 2023 U23 World Wrestling Championships – Men's freestyle 57 kg =

Wrestling competitions

Men's freestyle 57 kg at the 2023 U23 World Championships
- Venue: Tirana Olympic Park
- Dates: 24–25 October
- Competitors: 21 from 18 nations

Medalists
gold medal	Nachyn Mongush	Authorised Neutral Athletes
silver medal	Manvel Khndzrtsyan	Armenia
bronze medal	Bekzat Almaz Uulu	Kyrgyzstan
bronze medal	Batkhuyagiin Mönkh-Erdene	Mongolia

The men's freestyle 57 kg is a competition featured at the 2023 U23 World Wrestling Championships, and was held in Tirana, Albania on 24 and 25 October 2023.

This freestyle wrestling competition consists of a single-elimination tournament, with a repechage used to determine the winner of two bronze medals. The two finalists face off for gold and silver medals. Each wrestler who loses to one of the two finalists moves into the repechage, culminating in a pair of bronze medal matches featuring the semifinal losers each facing the remaining repechage opponent from their half of the bracket.

== Results ==
Legend

- F — Won by fall

=== Final ===
Final
Nachyn Mongush (ANA)	11
Manvel Khndzrtsyan (ARM)	0

=== Top half ===
Round of 32
Diamantino Iuna Fafé (GBS)	9
Yusuf Demir (TUR)	11
Nachyn Mongush (ANA)	10
Luka Gvinjilia (GEO)	0
Jacob Morán (PUR)	12
Thomas Epp (SUI)	2

Round of 16
Ben Hachem Tarik (MAR)	2
Dzmitry Shamela (ANA)	14
Yusuf Demir (TUR)	2
Bekzat Almaz Uulu (KGZ)	11
Yerassyl Mukhtaruly (KAZ)	1
Nachyn Mongush (ANA)	7
Jacob Morán (PUR)	0
Tatsuya Tsukaoka (JPN)	2

Quarterfinals
Dzmitry Shamela (ANA)	1
Bekzat Almaz Uulu (KGZ)	9^{F}
Nachyn Mongush (ANA)	7
Tatsuya Tsukaoka (JPN)	6

Semifinals
Bekzat Almaz Uulu (KGZ)	6
Nachyn Mongush (ANA)	6

=== Bottom half ===
Round of 32
Anton Vlas (MDA)	0
Heorhii Kazanzhy (UKR)	10
Cooper Flynn (USA)	4
Vasyl Ilnytskyi (POL)	1

Round of 16
Shubham Kaushik (UWW)	10
Khalil Barkouti (TUN)	0
Heorhii Kazanzhy (UKR)	2
Batkhuyagiin Mönkh-Erdene (MGL)	9
Manvel Khndzrtsyan (ARM)	11
Cooper Flynn (USA)	0
Rahman Imanov (AZE)	6
Niklas Stechele (GER)	10

Quarterfinals
Shubham Kaushik (UWW)	2
Batkhuyagiin Mönkh-Erdene (MGL)	13
Manvel Khndzrtsyan (ARM)	2
Niklas Stechele (GER)	1

Semifinals
Batkhuyagiin Mönkh-Erdene (MGL)	3
Manvel Khndzrtsyan (ARM)	13

=== Repechage ===
Repechage round 1
Luka Gvinjilia (GEO)	0
Yerassyl Mukhtaruly (KAZ)	6

Repechage round 2
Yerassyl Mukhtaruly (KAZ)	14
Tatsuya Tsukaoka (JPN)	2
Cooper Flynn (USA)	2
Niklas Stechele (GER)	3

Bronze medals
Yerassyl Mukhtaruly (KAZ)	3
Bekzat Almaz Uulu (KGZ)	6
Niklas Stechele (GER)	5
Batkhuyagiin Mönkh-Erdene (MGL)	7

== Final standing ==
Rank	Athlete
1st place, gold medalist(s)	Nachyn Mongush (ANA)
2nd place, silver medalist(s)	Manvel Khndzrtsyan (ARM)
3rd place, bronze medalist(s)	Bekzat Almaz Uulu (KGZ)
3rd place, bronze medalist(s)	Batkhuyagiin Mönkh-Erdene (MGL)
5	Yerassyl Mukhtaruly (KAZ)
5	Niklas Stechele (GER)
7	Heorhii Kazanzhy (UKR)
8	Shubham Kaushik (UWW)
9	Tatsuya Tsukaoka (JPN)
10	Dzmitry Shamela (ANA)
11	Jacob Morán (PUR)
12	Yusuf Demir (TUR)
13	Cooper Flynn (USA)
14	Diamantino Iuna Fafé (GBS)
15	Rahman Imanov (AZE)
16	Thomas Epp (SUI)
17	Ben Hachem Tarik (MAR)
18	Vasyl Ilnytskyi (POL)
19	Khalil Barkouti (TUN)
20	Anton Vlas (MDA)
21	Luka Gvinjilia (GEO)
