= Gulomjon Abdullaev =

Uzbekistani freestyle wrestler

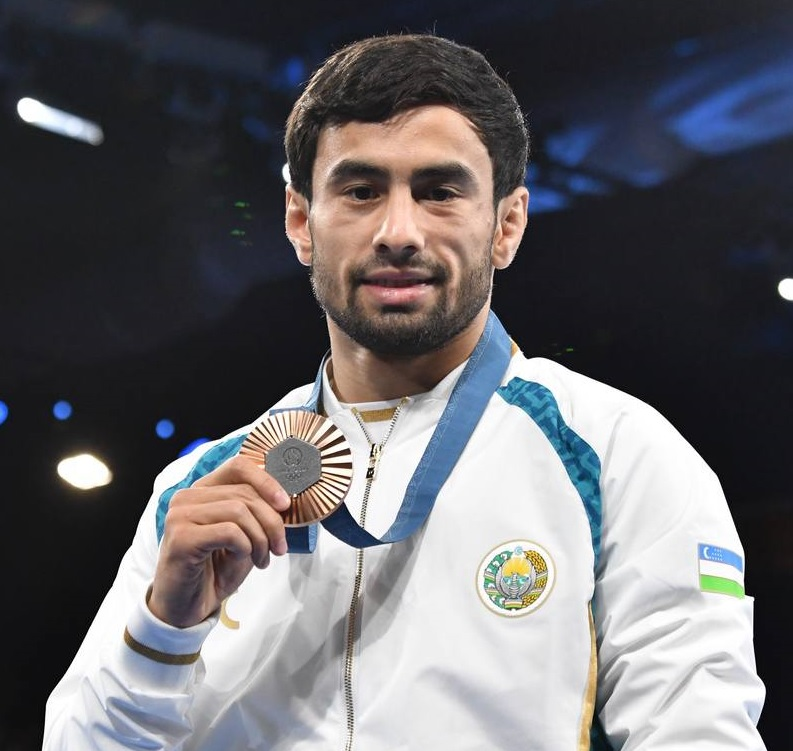
- Gulomjon Abdullaev at the 2024 Summer Olympics

Personal information
- Born: 11 November 1998 (age 27) Tashkent, Uzbekistan
- Height: 168 cm (5 ft 6 in)

Sport
- Country: Uzbekistan
- Sport: Wrestling
- Weight class: 57 kg
- Event: Freestyle

Achievements and titles
- Olympic finals: (bronze) (2024)
- World finals: (bronze) (2025)
- Regional finals: (bronze) (2026)
Medal record
Men's freestyle wrestling
Representing Uzbekistan
Olympic Games
Bronze medal – third place	2024 Paris	57 kg
World Championships
Bronze medal – third place	2025 Zagreb	57 kg
Asian Championships
Bronze medal – third place	2026 Bishkek	61 kg
Islamic Solidarity Games
Gold medal – first place	2021 Konya	57 kg
Bronze medal – third place	2025 Riyadh	57 kg
Waclaw Ziolkowski Memorial
Gold medal – first place	2021 Warsaw	61 kg
Yasar Dogu Tournament
Silver medal – second place	2022 Istanbul	61 kg
Silver medal – second place	2020 Istanbul	57 kg
Ivan Yarygin Cup
Bronze medal – third place	2024 Krasnoyarsk	57 kg
Olympic Qualification Tournament
Gold medal – first place	2021 Almaty	57 kg
World Juniors Championships
Bronze medal – third place	2016 Macon	55 kg
Asian Juniors Championships
Gold medal – first place	2018 New Delhi	57 kg
Gold medal – first place	2016 Manila	55 kg
Asian Cadets Championships
Bronze medal – third place	2015 New Delhi	55 kg
Men's collegiate wrestling
Representing the Menlo Oaks
NAIA Championships
Gold medal – first place	2023 Wichita	133 lb

Gulomjon Abdullaev (born 11 November 1998) is an Uzbekistani freestyle wrestler who competes at 57 kilograms. A 2016 Junior World Championship bronze medalist, Abdullaev qualified to represent Uzbekistan at the 2020 Summer Olympics after sweeping out the 2021 Asian Olympic Qualification Tournament.

== Career ==
In 2022, he won the silver medal in his event at the Yasar Dogu Tournament held in Istanbul, Turkey. He won the gold medal in his event at the 2021 Islamic Solidarity Games held in Konya, Turkey. He competed in the 57 kg event at the 2022 World Wrestling Championships held in Belgrade, Serbia.

He also was a collegiate wrestler for Menlo College in Atherton, California, USA, where he was an NAIA national champion, winning 7–3 in the championship match.

He competed at the 2024 Asian Wrestling Olympic Qualification Tournament in Bishkek, Kyrgyzstan and he earned a quota place for Uzbekistan for the 2024 Summer Olympics in Paris, France. He won one of the bronze medals in the men's freestyle 57 kg event at the 2024 Summer Olympics.
