= 2025 Golden Grand Prix Ivan Yarygin =

Freestyle wrestling international tournament in Krasnoyarsk, Russia

Ivan Yarygin 2025
- Host city: Krasnoyarsk, Russia
- Dates: 22-27 January 2025
- Stadium: Ivan Yarygin Sports Palace

The XXXVI (36th) Golden Grand Prix Ivan Yarygin 2025, also known as Ivan Yarygin (Yariguin) 2025, Ivan Yarygin's cup is a freestyle wrestling international tournament that being hold in Krasnoyarsk, Russia between 23 and 26 January 2025.

== Event videos ==
The event will air freely on the wrestlingtv.ru channel.

Broadcasting
23 January 2025 Mat A	23 January 2025 Mat B	23 January 2025 Mat C
24 January 2025 Mat A	24 January 2025 Mat B	24 January 2025 Mat C
25 January 2025 Mat A	25 January 2025 Mat B	25 January 2025 Mat C
26 January 2025 Mat A	26 January 2025 Mat B	26 January 2025 Mat C

== Medal table ==
=== By Countries ===
Rank	Nation	Gold	Silver	Bronze	Total
1	Russia	17	16	32	65
2	Belarus	2	0	3	5
3	Kazakhstan	1	1	1	3
4	Mongolia	0	2	0	2
5	Uzbekistan	0	1	1	2
6	Iran	0	0	2	2
7	Hungary	0	0	1	1
Totals (7 entries)		20	20	40	80

=== By Regions ===
Rank	Nation	Gold	Silver	Bronze	Total
1	Dagestan	6	5	7	18
2	Khanty-Mansi Autonomous Okrug	3	0	1	4
3	Belarus	2	0	3	5
4	Saint Petersburg	1	1	3	5
5	Kazakhstan	1	1	1	3
6	Tuva	1	1	0	2
7	Krasnoyarsk Krai	1	0	3	4
8	Kemerovo Oblast	1	0	1	2
9	Chuvashia	1	0	0	1
9	(Autonomous Republic of Crimea) Crimea	1	0	0	1
9	Khakassia	1	0	0	1
9	Novgorod Oblast	1	0	0	1
13	Krasnodar Krai	0	3	2	5
14	(Sakha Republic) Yakutia	0	2	2	4
15	Buryatia	0	2	1	3
16	Mongolia	0	2	0	2
17	Bryansk Oblast	0	1	1	2
17	Uzbekistan	0	1	1	2
19	Moscow	0	1	0	1
20	Iran	0	0	2	2
20	Kaliningrad Oblast	0	0	2	2
20	Rostov Oblast	0	0	2	2
23	Chechnya	0	0	1	1
23	Hungary	0	0	1	1
23	Irkutsk Oblast	0	0	1	1
23	Moscow Oblast	0	0	1	1
23	(North Ossetia–Alania) North Ossetia-Alania	0	0	1	1
23	Perm Krai	0	0	1	1
23	Sevastopol	0	0	1	1
23	Tatarstan	0	0	1	1
Totals (30 entries)		20	20	40	80

== Medal overview ==
=== Men's freestyle ===
Event	Gold	Silver	Bronze
57 kg	Nachyn Mongush; Tuva	Lev Pavlov; Yakutia	Artur Chebodaev; Krasnoyarsk Krai
57 kg	Nachyn Mongush; Tuva	Lev Pavlov; Yakutia	Yunus Yavbatirov; Dagestan
61 kg	Zaur Uguev; Dagestan	Muslim Mekhtikhanov; Dagestan	Anzor Mazhidov; Dagestan
61 kg	Zaur Uguev; Dagestan	Muslim Mekhtikhanov; Dagestan	Aleksandr Avelov; Yakutia
65 kg	Ibragim Ibragimov; Dagestan	Ramazan Ferzaliev; Dagestan	Aripgadzhiyav Abdulaev; Kaliningrad Oblast
65 kg	Ibragim Ibragimov; Dagestan	Ramazan Ferzaliev; Dagestan	Chayaan Mongush; Irkutsk Oblast
70 kg	David Baev; Khanty-Mansi Autonomous Okrug	Konstantin Kaprynov; Yakutia	Magomed-Emi Eltemirov; Chechnya
70 kg	David Baev; Khanty-Mansi Autonomous Okrug	Konstantin Kaprynov; Yakutia	Kurban Shiraev; Dagestan
74 kg	Zaurbek Sidakov; Khanty-Mansi Autonomous Okrug	Magoma Dibirgadzhiev; Dagestan	Amir Mohammad Yazdani; Iran
74 kg	Zaurbek Sidakov; Khanty-Mansi Autonomous Okrug	Magoma Dibirgadzhiev; Dagestan	Timur Bizhoev; Krasnodar Krai
79 kg	Akhmed Usmanov; Dagestan	Gadzhimurad Alikhmaev; Bryansk Oblast	Akhmed Manilov; Kaliningrad Oblast
79 kg	Akhmed Usmanov; Dagestan	Gadzhimurad Alikhmaev; Bryansk Oblast	Dzhamal Akhmadudinov; Dagestan
86 kg	Artur Naifonov; Khanty-Mansi Autonomous Okrug	Arslan Bagaev; Moscow	Ada Bagomedov; Dagestan
86 kg	Artur Naifonov; Khanty-Mansi Autonomous Okrug	Arslan Bagaev; Moscow	Dmitrii Zainidinov; Krasnoyarsk Krai
92 kg	Azamat Zakuev; Crimea	Magomed-Tagir Khaniev; Dagestan	Magomedsharif Biyakaev; Dagestan
92 kg	Azamat Zakuev; Crimea	Magomed-Tagir Khaniev; Dagestan	Alan Bagaev; Khanty-Mansi Autonomous Okrug
97 kg	Magomed Kurbanov; Dagestan	Bady-Maadyr Samdan; Tuva	Irbeg Tavgazov; North Ossetia
97 kg	Magomed Kurbanov; Dagestan	Bady-Maadyr Samdan; Tuva	Konstantin Pshenichnikov; Kemerovo Oblast
125 kg	Zelimkhan Khizriev; Saint Petersburg	Artiom Pukhovsky; Krasnodar Krai	Igor Ovsyannikov; Krasnoyarsk Krai
125 kg	Zelimkhan Khizriev; Saint Petersburg	Artiom Pukhovsky; Krasnodar Krai	Morteza Jan-Mohammadzadeh; Iran

=== Women's freestyle ===
Event	Gold	Silver	Bronze
50 kg	Nadezhda Sokolova; Novgorod Oblast	Elizaveta Smirnova; Dagestan	Viyaleta Chyryk; Belarus
50 kg	Nadezhda Sokolova; Novgorod Oblast	Elizaveta Smirnova; Dagestan	Aktenge Keunimjaeva; Uzbekistan
53 kg	Natalia Malysheva; Khakassia	Anzhelika Vetoshkina; Saint Petersburg	Natia Svanidze; Rostov Oblast
53 kg	Natalia Malysheva; Khakassia	Anzhelika Vetoshkina; Saint Petersburg	Viktoriia Vaulina; Perm Krai
55 kg	Ekaterina Verbina; Dagestan	Aleksandra Skirenko; Krasnodar Krai	Kristina Ponomareva; Bryansk Oblast
55 kg	Ekaterina Verbina; Dagestan	Aleksandra Skirenko; Krasnodar Krai	Sevil Nazarova; Yakutia
57 kg	Veronika Chumikova; Chuvashia	Laylokhon Sobirova; Uzbekistan	Kristina Mikhneva; Sevastopol
57 kg	Veronika Chumikova; Chuvashia	Laylokhon Sobirova; Uzbekistan	Erzhema Zhamsaranova; Buryatia
59 kg	Anastasiia Sidelnikova; Kemerovo Oblast	Ulyana Tukurenova; Buryatia	Marina Simonian; Rostov Oblast
59 kg	Anastasiia Sidelnikova; Kemerovo Oblast	Ulyana Tukurenova; Buryatia	Nadzeya Bulanaya; Belarus
62 kg	Veranika Ivanova; Belarus	Viktoriia Khusainova; Kazakhstan	Ekaterina Koshkina; Tatarstan
62 kg	Veranika Ivanova; Belarus	Viktoriia Khusainova; Kazakhstan	Tynys Dubek; Kazakhstan
65 kg	Dinara Kudaeva; Krasnoyarsk Krai	Valeria Dondupova; Buryatia	Ekaterina Oleinikova; Saint Petersburg
65 kg	Dinara Kudaeva; Krasnoyarsk Krai	Valeria Dondupova; Buryatia	Elizaveta Petliakova; Saint Petersburg
68 kg	Alina Shauchuk; Belarus	Enkhsaikhany Delgermaa; Mongolia	Noémi Szabados; Hungary
68 kg	Alina Shauchuk; Belarus	Enkhsaikhany Delgermaa; Mongolia	Alina Shevchenko; Moscow Oblast
72 kg	Kseniia Burakova; Dagestan	Kristina Bratchikova; Krasnodar Krai	Vusala Parfianovich; Dagestan
72 kg	Kseniia Burakova; Dagestan	Kristina Bratchikova; Krasnodar Krai	Olesia Bezuglova; Saint Petersburg
76 kg	Elmira Syzdykova; Kazakhstan	Enkh-Amaryn Davaanasan; Mongolia	Olga Kozyreva; Krasnodar Krai
76 kg	Elmira Syzdykova; Kazakhstan	Enkh-Amaryn Davaanasan; Mongolia	Anastasiya Zimiankova; Belarus

== Participating nations ==
17 nations participated.

- Azerbaijan
- Belarus
- China
- Cuba
- Hungary
- India
- Iran
- Kazakhstan
- Kyrgyzstan
- North Macedonia
- Mexico
- Mongolia
- Russia
- South Korea
- Tajikistan
- Turkey
- Uzbekistan
