= Batkhuyagiin Mönkh-Erdene =

Mongolian wrestler (born 2001)

Personal information
- Native name: Батхуягийн Мөнх-Эрдэнэ
- Nationality: Mongolia
- Born: 27 November 2001 (age 24) Tes, Uvs, Mongolia
- Height: 160 cm (5 ft 3 in)

Sport
- Sport: Amateur wrestling
- Weight class: 57 kg
- Event: Freestyle

Achievements and titles
- Regional finals: (silver) (2025)
Medal record
Men's freestyle wrestling
Representing Mongolia
Asian Championships
| Silver medal – second place | 2026 Bishkek | 57 kg |
| Bronze medal – third place | 2025 Amman | 57 kg |
Golden Grand Prix Ivan Yarygin
| Gold medal – first place | 2026 Krasnoyarsk | 57 kg |
Grand Prix
| Gold medal – first place | 2025 Ulaanbaatar | 57 kg |
| Bronze medal – third place | 2025 New York | 57 kg |
U23 World Championships
| Bronze medal – third place | 2023 Tirana | 57 kg |

Batkhuyagiin Mönkh-Erdene (Mongolian: Батхуягийн Мөнх-Эрдэнэ, born 27 November 2001) is a Mongolian freestyle wrestler.

== Career ==
Mönkh-Erdene won a bronze medal in a 57 kg event at the 2025 Asian Wrestling Championships held in Amman, Jordan.

He also won the bronze medal in the 57 kg event at the 2023 U23 World Wrestling Championships in Tirana, Albania.

Mönkh-Erdene made his debut as a member of the Mongolian national team at a 2025 World Championships in the 57 kg event, where he beat 2020 European and 2020 Golden Grand Prix Ivan Yarygin′s champion Azamat Tuskaev 6-4 in the 1/32 final but lost to Arsen Harutyunyan by 8-13 in the next bout.

Mönkh-Erdene won the gold medal in the 57 kg event at the 2026 Golden Grand Prix Ivan Yarygin held in January 2026, Russian Krasnoyarsk, with wins over 2024 U23 Russian National Champion Yunus Yavbatirov (11-9), 2018 U20 World and 2021 U23 European Champion Idrisov Akhmed (5-1), 2025 U23 European Champion and multiple U21 Russian National Champion Lev Pavlov (2-1), reigning World and Asian Champion Han Chong-song (technical fall), and reigning Russian National Champion Musa Mekhtikhanov (8-6). He was voted the best foreign wrestler of the tournament.
