= Kyle Crutchmer =

American collegiate wrestler and mixed martial artist

- Born: May 5, 1993 (age 33); Tulsa, Oklahoma, U.S.
- Height: 5 ft 8 in (1.73 m)
- Weight: 170 lb (77 kg; 12 st)
- Division: Middleweight (2018) Welterweight (2019–present)
- Fighting out of: San Jose, California, U.S.
- Team: American Kickboxing Academy (2017–2023); Fortis MMA (2023–present)
- Wrestling: NCAA Division I Wrestling
- Years active: 2018–present

Mixed martial arts record
- Total: 12
- Wins: 10
- By knockout: 2
- By submission: 3
- By decision: 5
- Losses: 2
- By decision: 2

Other information
- University: Oklahoma State University
- Notable school: Union High School
- Mixed martial arts record from Sherdog

Kyle Crutchmer (born May 5, 1993) is an American professional mixed martial artist, freestyle wrestler and graduated collegiate wrestler, who competes in the welterweight division. He has previously competed inBellator MMA. As a folkstyle wrestler, he was a two-time NCAA All-American and two-time Big 12 champion.

== Early life ==
Crutchmer was born and raised in Tulsa, Oklahoma. He is the son of Kevin and Tina Crutchmer and has three siblings, Brian, Justin and Kayla. He has a very strong relationship with his stepbrother Brian, whom he grew up with since he was a baby when his mother abandoned him. Since then, they attended high school and college together and even wrestled in the same team. In Union High School he was a two-sport varsity athlete, competing in football (since his sophomore year) and wrestling. He was also a standout football player, helping his school win three OSSAA team titles.

== Wrestling career ==
=== High school ===
Crutchmer started wrestling in sixth grade. While competing for Union High School, he won two 6A OSSAA individual titles, an NHSCA Junior National title and compiled an 198–30 record in folkstyle. He was also highly successful in freestyle, as he won the USAW Fargo Junior Nationals in 2012 and placed second and third at the FILA Age-group Nationals.

=== College ===
Originally, Crutchmer was going to commit to the Sooners, but he ended up choosing the Cowboys as John Smith convinced him to and also to wrestle with his brother.

In his redshirt season (2012–2013), he compiled a 15–1 record in open tournaments at 174 pounds. As a freshman (2013–2014), he compiled a 20–8 record at three different weight classes throughout the season but did not compete at the Big 12's or the NCAA's. As a sophomore (2014–2015), he compiled a 21–7 record and won his first Big 12 title, helping the Cowboys to win the team title. At the NCAA's of that year, he went 4–2 to place fifth, earning All-American honors. As a junior (2015–2016), he compiled a 15–4 record, however, he suffered a season-ending injury at a dual match against the Sooners, leaving him unable to compete at the NCAA's or the Big 12's. As a senior (2016–2017), he compiled a 23–7 record and won his second Big 12 title at 174 pounds. At the NCAA championships, he compiled 5 wins and 2 losses to place seventh and earn All-American honors for the second time in his NCAA career.

Overall, Crutchmer was a two-time All-American and two-time Big 12 champion with a record of 79 victories and 26 defeats as a collegiate wrestler.

=== Freestyle ===
==== 2013 ====
Fresh out of high school, Crutchmer made his senior freestyle debut at the 2013 US University National Championships in May. He won three straight matches but was subsequently thrown to the consolation bracket by Alex Meyer in a 29-point match. He was ultimately eliminated in his next bout by Gabe Dean, an eventual heavily accomplished wrestler.

==== 2014 ====
While he was still a freshman in college, Crutchmer competed at the 2014 US National University Championships. He won his first five bouts by technical fall and the last one before the best-of-three finals by points. At the best-of-three, he defeated his opponent two times to none, winning the championship at 80 kilograms.

==== 2017 ====
After a big break of three years, Crutchmer competed at the US Open. He won his first match by technical fall but subsequently lost to two-time NCAA champion Gabe Dean and got thrown to the consolation bracket. He bounced back and defeated four opponents before losing once again and proceeding to face Pat Downey at the fifth place match. He lost the match on points and placed sixth, qualifying for the WTT Challenge Tournament.

At the World Team Trials Challenge tournament, he was eliminated in the quarterfinals by Pat Downey and was thrown to the consolation bracket, where he defeated eventual Greco-Roman World Team Member Joe Rau and was subsequently downed by Richard Perry.

== Mixed martial arts career ==
=== Early career ===
Soon after he graduated, he started training at American Kickboxing Academy. A couple of months later, he made his professional MMA debut. He compiled an undefeated 4–0 record before signing with Bellator MMA.

=== Bellator MMA ===
Crutchmer was scheduled to make his promotional debut against Antonio Jones on November 8, 2019, at Bellator 233. However, Jones withdrew from the bout and was replaced by Robert Gidron. He won the fight by unanimous decision.

In his next bout, Crutchmer faced Scott Futrell in a 175-pounds catchweight on February 21, 2020, at Bellator 239. He won the fight by submission in the first round.

Crutchmer faced Kemran Lachinov on October 15, 2020, at Bellator 249. He lost the bout by unanimous decision, marking the first loss of his mixed martial arts career.

Crutchmer faced undefeated Levan Chokheli at Bellator 260 on June 11, 2021. He won the bout via unanimous decision.

Crutchmer faced Oliver Enkamp on December 3, 2021, at Bellator 272. He won the bout via unanimous decision.

Crutchmer faced Michael Lombardo on April 15, 2022, at Bellator 277. He won the bout via unanimous decision.

Crutchmer faced Jaleel Willis on December 9, 2022, at Bellator 289. He lost the fight via unanimous decision.

Crutchmer, replacing Roman Faraldo, faced Bobby Nash on June 16, 2023, at Bellator 297. He won the bout in the first round, dropping Nash with a punch and finishing the bout via ground and pound.

== Personal life ==
In March 2020, Crutchmer and his girlfriend gave birth to their daughter.

== Championships and accomplishments ==
=== Amateur wrestling ===
==== Folkstyle ====
- National Collegiate Athletic Association
  - NCAA Division I All-American out of Oklahoma State University (2015, 2017)
  - NCAA Division I 174 lb - 5th Place out of Oklahoma State University (2015)
  - NCAA Division I 174 lb - 7th Place out of Oklahoma State University (2017)
- Big 12 Conference
  - Big 12 174 lb Conference Championship out of Oklahoma State University (2015, 2017)

==== Freestyle ====
- United World Wrestling
  - 2017 US Open Championships - 6th Place
  - 2014 US University National Championships - 1st Place
  - 2013 FILA Junior Nationals - 3rd place
  - 2010 FILA Cadet Nationals - 2nd place
- USA Wrestling
  - USA Wrestling Fargo All-American (2009, 2010, 2011, 2012)
  - 2012 Fargo Junior Nationals - 1st place
  - 2011 Fargo Junior Nationals - 4th place
  - 2011 Southern Plains Junior Regionals - 1st place
  - 2010 Fargo Junior Nationals - 6th place
  - 2010 Southern Plains Junior Regionals - 1st place
  - 2009 Fargo Cadet Nationals - 4th place

== Mixed martial arts record ==
Professional record breakdown
12 matches	10 wins	2 losses
By knockout	2	0
By submission	3	0
By decision	5	2

Res.	Record	Opponent	Method	Event	Date	Round	Time	Location	Notes
Win	10–2	Bobby Nash	TKO (punches)	Bellator 297	June 16, 2023	1	3:42	Chicago, Illinois, United States	
Loss	9–2	Jaleel Willis	Decision (unanimous)	Bellator 289	December 9, 2022	3	5:00	Uncasville, Connecticut, United States	
Win	9–1	Michael Lombardo	Decision (unanimous)	Bellator 277	April 15, 2022	3	5:00	San Jose, California, United States	
Win	8–1	Oliver Enkamp	Decision (unanimous)	Bellator 272	December 3, 2021	3	5:00	Uncasville, Connecticut, United States	
Win	7–1	Levan Chokheli	Decision (unanimous)	Bellator 260	June 11, 2021	3	5:00	Uncasville, Connecticut, United States	
Loss	6–1	Kemran Lachinov	Decision (unanimous)	Bellator 249	October 15, 2020	3	5:00	Uncasville, Connecticut, United States	
Win	6–0	Scott Futrell	Submission (anaconda choke)	Bellator 239	February 21, 2020	1	2:58	Thackerville, Oklahoma, United States	Catchweight (175 lb) bout.
Win	5–0	Robert Gidron	Decision (unanimous)	Bellator 233	November 8, 2019	3	5:00	Thackerville, Oklahoma, United States	
Win	4–0	Josh Weston	Decision (unanimous)	XFL 356	February 1, 2019	3	5:00	Tulsa, Oklahoma, United States	
Win	3–0	Brandon Wright	TKO (punches)	XFL 352	September 29, 2018	1	3:59	Tulsa, Oklahoma, United States	Welterweight debut.
Win	2–0	Rocky Rosas	Submission (arm-triangle choke)	XFL: Rage on the River	August 3, 2018	2	1:08	Tulsa, Oklahoma, United States	Catchweight (175 lbs) bout.
Win	1–0	Ronald Beasley	Technical Submission (guillotine choke)	XFL 348	June 9, 2018	1	1:23	Miami, Oklahoma, United States	Middleweight debut.

== Freestyle record ==
Senior Freestyle Matches
Res.	Record	Opponent	Score	Date	Event	Location
2017 US World Team Trials at 86kg
Loss	17–7	(United States) Richard Perry	3-9	June 9–10, 2017	2017 US World Team Trials Challenge Tournament	(United States) Lincoln, Nebraska
Win	17–6	(United States) Joe Rau	5-2	June 9–10, 2017	2017 US World Team Trials Challenge Tournament	(United States) Lincoln, Nebraska
Loss	16–6	(United States) Pat Downey	TF 1–14	June 9–10, 2017	2017 US World Team Trials Challenge Tournament	(United States) Lincoln, Nebraska
2017 US Open 6th at 86kg
Loss	16–5	(United States) Pat Downey	3-7	April 26–29, 2017	2017 US Open Wrestling Championships	(United States) Las Vegas, Nevada
Loss	16–4	(United States) Nick Heflin	2-7	April 26–29, 2017	2017 US Open Wrestling Championships	(United States) Las Vegas, Nevada
Win	16–3	(United States) Timothy Dudley	7-2	April 26–29, 2017	2017 US Open Wrestling Championships	(United States) Las Vegas, Nevada
Win	15–3	(United States) John Staudenmayer	6-0	April 26–29, 2017	2017 US Open Wrestling Championships	(United States) Las Vegas, Nevada
Win	14–3	(United States) Vic Avery	11-7	April 26–29, 2017	2017 US Open Wrestling Championships	(United States) Las Vegas, Nevada
Win	13–3	(United States) Xavier Montalvo	TF 14–0	April 26–29, 2017	2017 US Open Wrestling Championships	(United States) Las Vegas, Nevada
Loss	12–3	(United States) Gabe Dean	TF 4–15	April 26–29, 2017	2017 US Open Wrestling Championships	(United States) Las Vegas, Nevada
Win	12–2	(United States) Paul Rademacher	TF 10–0	April 26–29, 2017	2017 US Open Wrestling Championships	(United States) Las Vegas, Nevada
2014 US University Nationals (gold) at 80kg
Win	11–2	(United States) Tanner Weatherman	6-3	May 22–25, 2014	2014 US University National Championships	(United States) Akron, Ohio
Win	10–2	(United States) Tanner Weatherman	6-3	May 22–25, 2014	2014 US University National Championships	(United States) Akron, Ohio
Win	9–2	(United States) Micah Barnes	2-1	May 22–25, 2014	2014 US University National Championships	(United States) Akron, Ohio
Win	8–2	(United States) Tyler Rill	TF 11–0	May 22–25, 2014	2014 US University National Championships	(United States) Akron, Ohio
Win	7–2	(United States) John Staudenmayer	TF 13–2	May 22–25, 2014	2014 US University National Championships	(United States) Akron, Ohio
Win	6–2	(United States) Timothy Schaefer	TF 11–0	May 22–25, 2014	2014 US University National Championships	(United States) Akron, Ohio
Win	5–2	(United States) Travis Edwards	TF 12–1	May 22–25, 2014	2014 US University National Championships	(United States) Akron, Ohio
Win	4–2	(United States) Carson Powell	TF 10–0	May 22–25, 2014	2014 US University National Championships	(United States) Akron, Ohio
2013 US University Nationals at 84kg
Loss	3–2	(United States) Gabe Dean	TF 1–11	May 24–26, 2013	2013 US University National Championships	(United States) Akron, Ohio
Loss	3–1	(United States) Alex Meyer	TF 8-21	May 24–26, 2013	2013 US University National Championships	(United States) Akron, Ohio
Win	3–0	(United States) Victor Terrell	11-6	May 24–26, 2013	2013 US University National Championships	(United States) Akron, Ohio
Win	2–0	(United States) Blake Stauffer	2-0	May 24–26, 2013	2013 US University National Championships	(United States) Akron, Ohio
Win	1–0	(United States) Ryan Ward	TF 10–0	May 24–26, 2013	2013 US University National Championships	(United States) Akron, Ohio

== NCAA record ==
NCAA Championships Matches
Res.	Record	Opponent	Score	Date	Event
2017 NCAA Championships 7th at 174 lbs
Win	9–4	Jake Residori	9-4	March 17, 2017	2017 NCAA Division I Wrestling Championships
Loss	8–4	Zac Brunson	5-8	March 17, 2017	2017 NCAA Division I Wrestling Championships
Win	8–3	Alex Meyer	13-10	March 17, 2017	2017 NCAA Division I Wrestling Championships
Win	7–3	Christian Brucki	5-3	March 17, 2017	2017 NCAA Division I Wrestling Championships
Win	6–3	Ethan Ramos	5-3	March 17, 2017	2017 NCAA Division I Wrestling Championships
Win	5–3	Jacob Morrissey	MD 15–4	March 17, 2017	2017 NCAA Division I Wrestling Championships
Loss	4–3	Jake Residori	5-6	March 17, 2017	2017 NCAA Division I Wrestling Championships
2015 NCAA Championships 5th at 174 lbs
Win	4–2	Michael Evans	TB 2–1	March 20, 2015	2015 NCAA Division I Wrestling Championships
Loss	3–2	Logan Storley	TB 7–9	March 20, 2015	2015 NCAA Division I Wrestling Championships
Loss	3–1	Tyler Wilps	SV-1 1–3	March 20, 2015	2015 NCAA Division I Wrestling Championships
Win	3–0	Joe Latham	5-2	March 20, 2015	2015 NCAA Division I Wrestling Championships
Win	2–0	Blaise Butler	5-2	March 20, 2015	2015 NCAA Division I Wrestling Championships
Win	1–0	Jadaen Bernstein	5-3	March 20, 2015	2015 NCAA Division I Wrestling Championships

=== Stats ===
Season	Year	School	Rank	Weigh Class	Record	Win	Bonus
2017	Senior	Oklahoma State University	#11 (7th)	174	23-7	76.67%	26.67%
2016	Junior	Oklahoma State University	#11 (DNQ)	174	15-4	78.95%	31.58%
2015	Sophomore	Oklahoma State University	#9 (5th)	174	21-7	75.00%	10.71%
2014	Freshman	Oklahoma State University	#25 (DNQ)	174	20-8	71.43%	21.43%
Career					79-26	75.24%	21.90%

== See also ==
- List of male mixed martial artists
