= Pat Downey (wrestler) =

American wrestler and MMA fighter (born 1992)

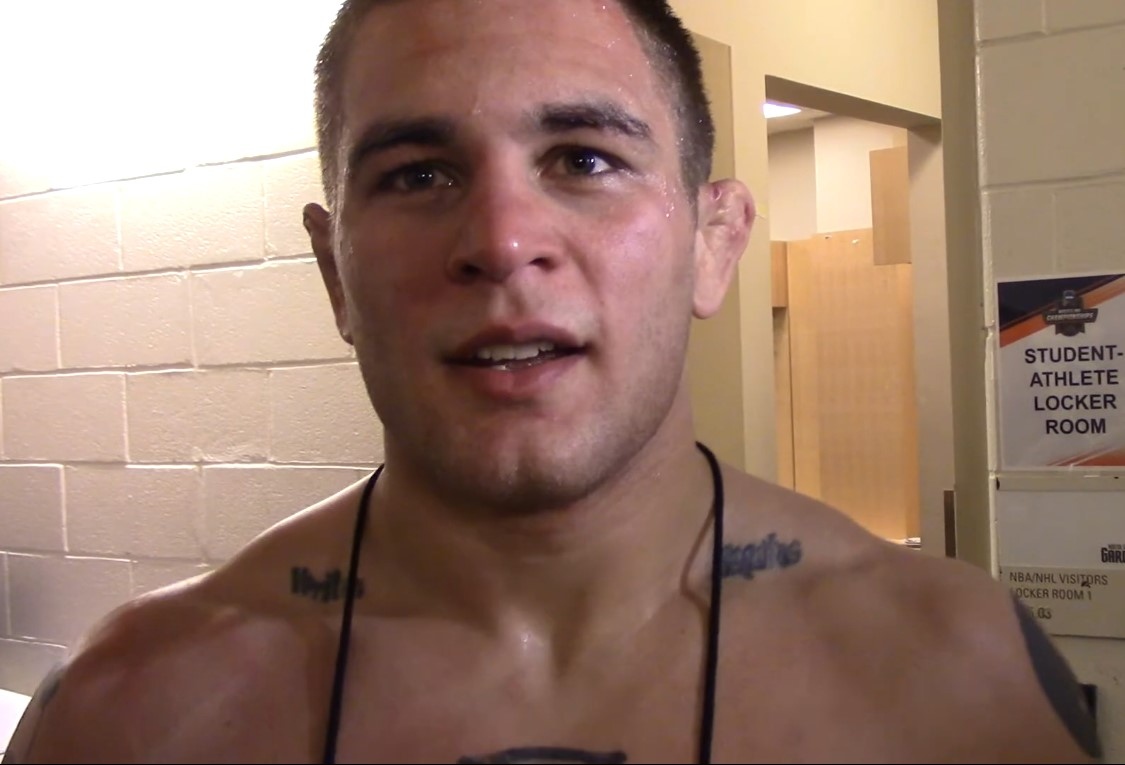
- Downey in 2016
- Born: James Patrick Downey III; August 7, 1992 (age 34); Baltimore, Maryland, U.S.
- Other names: Lizard King, The Excuse
- Weight: 185 lb (84 kg; 13.2 st)
- Division: Middleweight (2021–present)
- Fighting out of: Deerfield Beach, Florida, U.S.
- Team: Sanford MMA
- Wrestling: NCAA Division I Wrestling
- Years active: 2021–present

Mixed martial arts record
- Total: 2
- Wins: 1
- By submission: 1
- Losses: 1
- By knockout: 1

Other information
- University: Iowa State University
- Website: pd3grapplingacademy.com
- Mixed martial arts record from Sherdog

James Patrick Downey III (born August 7, 1992) is an American wrestler and professional mixed martial artist who competes in the middleweight division. As a freestyle wrestler, Downey competed at 86 kilograms and was a 2019 Pan American Games medalist and the 2019 US Open national champion. In collegiate wrestling, he was an NCAA Division I All-American in 2016 for the Iowa State Cyclones and an NJCAA champion for Iowa Central Community College.

== Folkstyle career ==
=== High school ===
Downey attended North County High School and Loch Raven High School, where he was a three-sport athlete, competing in wrestling, football and lacrosse. After placing third at the MPSSAA championships as a freshman, he went on to win the tournament every year and also won the NHSCA and USAW National Championships before his graduation in 2011. As a football player, he set a school record for total offense in a game with 420 total yards on 315 yards passing and 105 yards rushing his senior year and was one of three Maryland prep quarterbacks selected to the prestigious Super-22 Team. A legally problematic high schooler, Downey was multiple times denied of wrestling and playing football due to multiple charges.

=== College ===
==== University of Nebraska ====
After being invited to train at the United States Olympic Training Center by Bobby Douglas, he started residing and training in there. During his stay, he met Olympic Gold medalist and University of Nebraska graduate Jordan Burroughs, who played a big part on Downey's recruiting. He was accepted by the Nebraska Cornhuskers and was supposed to attend the University of Nebraska, but as a recently turned 21 year–old, he got sidetracked on partying. This caused head coach Mark Manning's decision of cutting Downey off the team, suggesting him to start a mixed martial arts career after breaking his thumb in a street fight.

==== Iowa Central Community College ====
After his deflected time at UNL, Downey attended Iowa Central Community College, an NJCAA level school. As a redshirt freshman competing at 197 pounds, he compiled an undefeated record and became the '15 NJCAA champion (helping the Tritons reach the team championship). He also went 10–1 against NCAA Division I competition, recording notable victories over Hawkeyes, Cornhuskers, Quakers, Sun Devils, etc.

==== Iowa State University ====
After putting things back on track, Downey was given two options; Iowa State University and University of Iowa. He ended up deciding to wear the Cyclones' cardinal and gold clothes, stating that some of the factors of his decision were his connections with coaches Kevin Jackson and Trent and Travis Paulson and his preference of the teammates. During his sophomore season (2015–16), he competed just three times and lost one of the matches, but still was the starter for the post-season at 197 pounds. He placed third at the Big 12 Conference championships and entered the NCAA championships unseeded. He performed well, taking out multiple high-seeded wrestlers to place fifth, earning All-American honors.

As a junior, he was finding high success at 184 pounds during the regular season, posting seven wins and no losses. On February 23, 2017, it was announced that Downey had been kicked off the wrestling team due to "repeated violations of team rules", as quoted by head coach Kevin Jackson. Despite some talks about a potential run as an Iowa Hawkeye, this finished Downey's collegiate wrestling career and he earned his degree from ISU via online courses.

== Freestyle career ==
=== Junior level ===
Downey was a standout junior level freestyle wrestler until 2014, year in which his eligibility to compete at this level expired. After failing to make the 2012 Senior US Olympic Team, he made the Junior World Team and went on to win a silver medal at the World Championships. He was also a FILA and USAW National Champion.

=== Senior level ===
==== 2011–2016 ====
He made his debut in 2011 (fresh out of high school) at the OTT qualifiers in an attempt to make the Olympic Team, but was unsuccessful after losing in the first round to eventual UFC champion and then NCAA DII champion Kamaru Usman. He competed just once between 2012 and 2013 and made his return in 2014. In this year, he won the Northern Plains tournament, placed sixth at the University Nationals and attended the World Team Trials. A year later, he competed at the ASICS US Nationals, the Northern Plains and the Bill Farrell Memorial but did not place, unlike the University Nationals in where he placed fourth. In 2016, he just wrestled one match.

==== 2017–2018 ====
In 2017, he made a return to freestyle in big fashion with a fifth-place finish at the US Open, which qualified him for the World Team Trials. At the WTT, he defeated two-time All-American turned MMA fighter Kyle Crutchmer but subsequently dropped his next two bouts. To close the year, he racked up a bronze medal from the Dave Schultz Memorial Invitational. In 2018, he once again placed at the US Open and (unlike the previous year) at the World Team Trials.

==== 2019–2020 ====
Downey completed his best year of competition as of now in 2019, as he racked up titles from the Dave Schultz Memorial International and the US Open and made the World Team after defeating Nick Heflin in the challenge finals and the defending World Champion David Taylor could not make it to Final X. After successfully making the team, Downey won a prestigious Pan American Games medal and went 2–1 at the World Championships. He then participated in a Super Fight against the accomplished submission grappler Nick Rodriguez, whom he tech'd after scoring 12 points to none.

In 2020, he won a bronze medal at the Matteo Pellicone Ranking Series in Italy and had a brief appearance at the Ivan Yarygin Golden Grand Prix. In February 2020, Downey competed at a special event where he faced the often referred as "Greatest Submission Grappler of All Time" Gordon Ryan. This event consisted of a freestyle wrestling match and a submission grappling match. In the wrestling match, Downey tech'd Ryan in seconds. In the sub only portion of the match, Downey tapped out to Ryan via 3/4 nelson.

Downey was scheduled to compete at the 2020 US Olympic Team Trials on April 4 at State College, Pennsylvania. However, the event was postponed for 2021 along with the Summer Olympics due to the COVID-19 pandemic, leaving all the qualifiers unable to compete.

After the Olympic Trials were postponed, Downey participated in the first wrestling event of the United States during the COVID-19 pandemic on June 28, at Rumble on the Rooftop. He faced Greco-Roman World Team Member Joe Rau in a mixed-rules match, this consisted in one period of Greco-Roman rules and other of freestyle rules, with no technical falls. After choosing Greco-Roman in the first period, Downey was down 9 points to none and could just pick up four points during the freestyle period, dropping the match 4–9.

===== Controversies =====
After several tweets where he made comments towards Greco-Roman and women's wrestling, Downey was dropped by the NJRTC, terminated by Paradigm Sport Management and Barbarian Appel and also lost his spot at the FloWrestling: Dake vs. Chamizo card where he was supposed to wrestle 2018 World Champion David Taylor on July 25, in a 5–day period.

==== 2021 ====
After more than a year of inactivity, Downey wrestled at the UWW Matteo Pellicone Ranking Series on March 7, at 92 kilograms, where he went 0–4. Downey then competed at the rescheduled US Olympic Team Trials in April, finishing fourth after going 1–2.

Downey was scheduled to face two-time US Open National champion at 97 kg Kyven Gadson on August 13 in an adapted folkstyle match at the Stalemates Street League event. However, Downey did not show up to the event. He was then scheduled to trim down to 79 kilograms and compete at the 2021 US World Team Trials on September 11–12, but once again did not show up.

==== 2025–2026 ====
Downey began competing in Real American Freestyle (RAF) in 2025. He faced Yoel Romero for the interim RAF Light Heavyweight Championship at RAF 04 on December 20, 2025, losing via technical fall.

Downey faced Zac Braunagel on July 18, 2026 at RAF 11 and lost by technical fall.

== Legal issues ==
In November 2009, Downey was charged with first-degree assault, after Baltimore Police stated he had beaten up a Towson University student in a parking lot. According to police, Downey broke the student's jaw and knocked off four of his teeth. In June 4 of 2010, Downey was once again charged with second-degree assault along with former teammate from North County HS Patrick Carey, after allegedly brawling with two Navy football players at a night club. Downey was also charged with assault and robbery in September 2010, when he was accused of beating up a classmate who sold him and two of Downey's friends marijuana after refusing to pay him, however, charges were dropped due to repeated changes in the victim's testimony.

After a trial that took place in July 2011, where Downey was facing up to 35 years of prison, Downey pled guilty to his crimes committed in November 2009, spending six days in jail. In 2017, Downey referred to his antics as a high schooler:

"The whole street thug persona that I was getting labeled as, there was no doubt about it. I wasn’t running with the right crew, and I wasn’t living right. You don’t catch three felony assault charges if you’re doing everything right. Obviously, I was in the wrong places at the wrong times with the wrong people. I cleaned my act up tenfold. I had to change to get the results I wanted. If I didn’t, I was going to lose my life.”

== Mixed martial arts career ==
=== Bellator MMA ===
Downey was formerly signed with Paradigm Sport Management and is now signed with SuckerPunch Entertainment. Downey first announced his intentions of pursuing mixed martial arts in 2018 and was scheduled to make his amateur debut in 2019 in a cancelled bout. Downey was rumored to make his professional debut on May 21, 2021, at LFA 108, in a middleweight bout, but an appearance never materialized.

On January 6, 2022, it was announced that Downey had signed with Bellator MMA and will reportedly make his debut later in the year. Downey was scheduled to make his MMA debut against Daniel Compton on April 15, 2022, at Bellator 277. After developing Red skin syndrome, Downey was forced to pull out of the bout.

Downey made his MMA and Bellator debut, facing Keyes Nelson, on August 12, 2022, at Bellator 284. He won the fight via arm-triangle choke 36 seconds into the bout.

Downey faced Christian Echols on December 9, 2022, at Bellator 289. Despite being a nearly 20-to-1 favorite, he lost the fight via knockout in the first round.

In February 2023, it was announced that Downey was released from Bellator.

== Mixed martial arts record ==
Professional record breakdown
2 matches	1 win	1 loss
By knockout	0	1
By submission	1	0

Res.	Record	Opponent	Method	Event	Date	Round	Time	Location	Notes
Loss	1–1	Christian Echols	KO (punches)	Bellator 289	December 9, 2022	1	2:27	Uncasville, Connecticut, United States	
Win	1–0	Keyes Nelson	Submission (arm-triangle choke)	Bellator 284	August 12, 2022	1	0:36	Sioux Falls, South Dakota, United States	Middleweight debut.

== Submission grappling career ==
In February 2020, Downey competed at a special event where he faced the often referred as "Greatest Submission Grappler of All Time" Gordon Ryan in two matches, one consisting of wrestling rules and the other of grappling rules. In the grappling match, Downey was submitted via a half nelson hold. He was then slated to face Nick Rodriguez with submission grappling rules in March, in a rematch from their freestyle wrestling match in 2019, but the event was cancelled due to the COVID-19 pandemic.

Downey made his return to the sport at Subversiv 5 on May 1, 2021, defeating Rasheed Perez by unanimous decision. Downey then competed at the Third Coast Grappling Middleweight Grand Prix on June 19, being eliminated in the first match by Pedro Marinho. He was then scheduled to compete at a Sub Spectrum event on August 14, one day after a wrestling match with Kyven Gadson, but did not show up to either event.

Downey competed in the over 80 kg division of the Craig Jones Invitational on August 16–17, 2024. He defeated Luke Rockhold by decision in the opening round and lost to Adam Bradly in the quarter-final by decision. He was later awarded the first stripe on his Brazilian jiu-jitsu white belt after the performance.

Downey entered the IBJJF No Gi World Championship 2024 as a blue belt. He won all five matches but was disqualified in the final due to unsportsmanlike conduct after a fight broke out between him and his opponent. Downey was later suspended from IBJJF competition for five years as a result of his conduct.

Downey competed against Andre Petroski in the co-main event of Fury Pro Grappling 12 on December 28, 2024. He won the match by golden score in overtime. Downey entered the Mat Assassin Grand Prix on January 19, 2025. He won his first two matches before being submitted in the semi-finals.

Downey was scheduled to face Deron Winn in a no gi submission grappling superfight at Spokane Submission Series 4 on March 1, 2025. Both Downey and Winn withdrew from the match.

Downey competed against Chris Weidman at Fury Pro Grappling 13 on May 23, 2025. He won the match by golden score in overtime

== Submission grappling record ==
3 Matches, 1 Win, 2 Losses (2 Submissions)
Result	Rec.	Opponent	Method	Event	Division	Type	Year	Location
2021 3CG Grand Prix IV DNP at 85 kg
Loss	1–2	(Brazil) Pedro Marinho	Submission (heel hook)	3CG 7: The Middleweights	85 kg	Nogi	June 19, 2021	(United States) Houston, Texas
Win	1–1	(United States) Rasheed Perez	Decision (unanimous)	Subversiv 5	Superfight	Nogi	May 2, 2021	(United States) Miami, Florida
Loss	0–1	(United States) Gordon Ryan	Submission (power half)	BJJ Fanatics	Superfight	Nogi	February 29, 2020	(United States) Beverly, Massachusetts

== Freestyle record ==
Senior Freestyle Matches
Res.	Record	Opponent	Score	Date	Event	Location
Real American Freestyle
Loss	62–43	(United States) Zac Braunagel	TF 2–12	July 18, 2026	RAF 11	(United States) Milwaukee, Wisconsin
Loss	62–42	(Cuba) Yoel Romero	TF 0–10	December 20, 2025	RAF 04	(United States) Fishers, Indiana
Win	62–41	(United States) Joaquin Buckley	TF 12–0	November 29, 2025	RAF 03	(United States) Chicago, Illinois
Loss	61–41	(United States) Jake Varner	1–5	October 25, 2025	RAF 02	(United States) State College, Pennsylvania
2020 US Olympic Team Trials 4th at 86 kg
Loss	61–40	(United States) Zahid Valencia	TF 1–11	April 2–3, 2021	2020 US Olympic Team Trials	(United States) Fort Worth, Texas
Win	61–39	(United States) Aaron Brooks	TF 11–0	April 2–3, 2021	2020 US Olympic Team Trials	(United States) Fort Worth, Texas
Loss	60–39	(United States) Bo Nickal	TF 3–13	April 2–3, 2021	2020 US Olympic Team Trials	(United States) Fort Worth, Texas
2021 Matteo Pellicone Ranking Series DNP at 92 kg
Loss	60–38	(Turkey) Selim Yaşar	1–6	March 7, 2021	Matteo Pellicone Ranking Series 2021	Rome, Italy
Loss	60–37	(Turkey) Erhan Yaylacı	2–11	March 7, 2021	Matteo Pellicone Ranking Series 2021	Rome, Italy
Win	60–36	(United States) Gordon Ryan	TF 11–0	February 29, 2020	2020 BJJ Fanatics Grand Prix	(United States) Beverly, Massachusetts
2020 Ivan Yarygin Grand Prix 14th at 86 kg
Loss	59–36	(Russia) Soslan Ktsoyev	6–6	January 23–26, 2020	Golden Grand Prix Ivan Yarygin 2020	Krasnoyarsk, Russia
2020 Matteo Pellicone RS (bronze) at 86 kg
Win	59–35	(Ukraine) Illia Archaia	13–7	January 15–18, 2020	Matteo Pellicone Ranking Series 2020	Rome, Italy
Loss	58–35	(United States) Alex Dieringer	2–3	January 15–18, 2020	Matteo Pellicone Ranking Series 2020	Rome, Italy
Win	58–34	(Puerto Rico) Ethan Ramos	9–5	January 15–18, 2020	Matteo Pellicone Ranking Series 2020	Rome, Italy
Win	57–34	(Turkey) OsmaOsman Göçenyle="font-size:88%"|12–5		January 15–18, 2020	Matteo Pellicone Ranking Series 2020	Rome, Italy
Win	56–34	(United States) Nick Rodriguez	TF 12–0	October 4–5, 2019	2019 Who's Number One	(United States) Iowa City, Iowa
2019 World Championships 9th at 86 kg
Loss	55–34	(Germany) Ahmed Dudarov	TF 0–13	September 21–22, 2019	2019 World Championships	Nur-Sultan, Kazakhstan
Win	55–33	(Poland) Zbigniew Baranowski	8–2	September 21–22, 2019	2019 World Championships	Nur-Sultan, Kazakhstan
Win	54–33	(Armenia) Hovhannes Mkhitaryan	TF 11–1	September 21–22, 2019	2019 World Championships	Nur-Sultan, Kazakhstan
2019 Pan American Games (bronze) at 86 kg
Win	53–33	(Canada) Alexander Moore	Fall	August 10, 2019	2019 Pan American Games	Lima, Peru
Loss	52–33	(Cuba) Yurieski Torreblanca	2–7	August 10, 2019	2019 Pan American Games	Lima, Peru
Win	52–32	(Jamaica) Angus Arthur	TF 14–3	August 10, 2019	2019 Pan American Games	Lima, Peru
2019 Yasar Dogu 5th at 86 kg
Loss	51–32	(Turkey) Osman Göçen	6–7	July 11–14, 2019	2019 Yasar Dogu International	Istanbul, Turkey
Loss	51–31	(India) Deepak Punia	5–11	July 11–14, 2019	2019 Yasar Dogu International	Istanbul, Turkey
2019 US World Team Trials (gold) at 86kg
Win	51–30	(United States) Nick Heflin	4–0	May 17–19, 2019	2019 US World Team Trials Challenge	(United States) Raleigh, North Carolina
Win	50–30	(United States) Nick Heflin	6–2	May 17–19, 2019	2019 US World Team Trials Challenge	(United States) Raleigh, North Carolina
2019 US Open (gold) at 86 kg
Win	49–30	(United States) Nick Heflin	10–4	April 24–27, 2019	2019 US Open National Championships	(United States) Las Vegas, Nevada
Win	48–30	(United States) Myles Martin	9–7	April 24–27, 2019	2019 US Open National Championships	(United States) Las Vegas, Nevada
Win	47–30	(United States) Kenneth Courts	9–4	April 24–27, 2019	2019 US Open National Championships	(United States) Las Vegas, Nevada
Win	46–30	(United States) Kevin Parker	Fall	April 24–27, 2019	2019 US Open National Championships	(United States) Las Vegas, Nevada
Win	45–30	(United States) Pat Romero	TF 13–0	April 24–27, 2019	2019 US Open National Championships	(United States) Las Vegas, Nevada
Win	44–30	(United States) Cameron Caffey	10–4	April 24–27, 2019	2019 US Open National Championships	(United States) Las Vegas, Nevada
2019 Granma y Cerro Pelado 7th at 86 kg
Loss	43–30	(Dominican Republic) Yorli Jimenez		February 15–23, 2019	2019 Granma y Cerro Pelado International	Havana, Cuba
Loss	43–29	(Cuba) Yurieski Torreblanca		February 15–23, 2019	2019 Granma y Cerro Pelado International	Havana, Cuba
2019 Dave Schultz M. International (gold) at 86 kg
Win	43–28	(United States) Kenneth Courts	TF 12–2	January 24–26, 2019	2019 Dave Schultz Memorial International	(United States) Colorado Springs, Colorado
Win	42–28	(United States) Brett Pfarr	7–4	January 24–26, 2019	2019 Dave Schultz Memorial International	(United States) Colorado Springs, Colorado
Win	41–28	(United States) Josh Asper	6–4	January 24–26, 2019	2019 Dave Schultz Memorial International	(United States) Colorado Springs, Colorado
2018 Alany International 12th at 86 kg
Loss	40–28	(Russia) Slavik Naniev	4–7	December 7–9, 2018	2018 Alany International	Vladikavkaz, Russia
2018 US World Team Trials 4th at 86 kg
Loss	40–27	(United States) Richard Perry	4–7	July 23, 2018	2018 US World Team Trials True Thirds	(United States) Bethlehem, Pennsylvania
Win	40–26	(United States) Joe Rau	7–0	May 18–20, 2018	2018 US World Team Trials Challenge	(United States) Rochester, Minnesota
Win	39–26	(United States) Ryan McWatters	10–5	May 18–20, 2018	2018 US World Team Trials Challenge	(United States) Rochester, Minnesota
Loss	38–26	(United States) Joe Rau	2–7	May 18–20, 2018	2018 US World Team Trials Challenge	(United States) Rochester, Minnesota
2018 US Open 7th at 86 kg
Win	38–25	(United States) Brandon Supernaw	TF 10–0	April 24–28, 2018	2018 US Open National Championships	(United States) Las Vegas, Nevada
Loss	37–25	(United States) Nick Reenan	Fall	April 24–28, 2018	2018 US Open National Championships	(United States) Las Vegas, Nevada
Win	37–24	(United States) Noe Garcia	Fall	April 24–28, 2018	2018 US Open National Championships	(United States) Las Vegas, Nevada
Win	36–24	(United States) Anthony Lodermeier	TF 12–2	April 24–28, 2018	2018 US Open National Championships	(United States) Las Vegas, Nevada
Loss	35–24	(United States) Dominic Ducharme	10–18	April 24–28, 2018	2018 US Open National Championships	(United States) Las Vegas, Nevada
2017 Dave Schultz M. Invitational (bronze) at 86 kg
Win	35–23	(Japan) Takahiro Murayama	TF 10–0	November 1–4, 2017	2017 Dave Schultz Memorial Invitational	(United States) Colorado Springs, Colorado
Loss	34–23	(United States) Richard Perry	1–2	November 1–4, 2017	2017 Dave Schultz Memorial Invitational	(United States) Colorado Springs, Colorado
Win	34–22	(South Korea) Kim Gwan-uk	2–1	November 1–4, 2017	2017 Dave Schultz Memorial Invitational	(United States) Colorado Springs, Colorado
Loss	33–22	(Russia) Aleksander Musalaliev	2–3	November 1–4, 2017	2017 Dave Schultz Memorial Invitational	(United States) Colorado Springs, Colorado
2017 US World Team Trials DNP at 86 kg
Loss	33–21	(United States) Austin Trotman	5–14	June 9–10, 2017	2017 US World Team Trials Challenge	(United States) Lincoln, Nebraska
Loss	33–20	(United States) David Taylor	TF 0–10	June 9–10, 2017	2017 US World Team Trials Challenge	(United States) Lincoln, Nebraska
Win	33–19	(United States) Kyle Crutchmer	TF 14–1	June 9–10, 2017	2017 US World Team Trials Challenge	(United States) Lincoln, Nebraska
2017 US Open 5th at 86 kg
Win	32–19	(United States) Kyle Crutchmer	7–3	April 26–29, 2017	2017 US Open National Championships	(United States) Las Vegas, Nevada
Loss	31–19	(United States) Bo Nickal	TF 2–12	April 26–29, 2017	2017 US Open National Championships	(United States) Las Vegas, Nevada
Win	31–18	(United States) Gabe Dean	7–6	April 26–29, 2017	2017 US Open National Championships	(United States) Las Vegas, Nevada
Win	30–18	(United States) Josh Asper	7–2	April 26–29, 2017	2017 US Open National Championships	(United States) Las Vegas, Nevada
Loss	29–18	(United States) David Taylor	TF 0–10	April 26–29, 2017	2017 US Open National Championships	(United States) Las Vegas, Nevada
Win	29–17	(United States) Peter Renda	9–6	April 26–29, 2017	2017 US Open National Championships	(United States) Las Vegas, Nevada
Win	28–17	(United States) Ryan McWatters	TF 14–4	April 26–29, 2017	2017 US Open National Championships	(United States) Las Vegas, Nevada
Win	27–17	(United States) Vic Avery	6–4	April 26–29, 2017	2017 US Open National Championships	(United States) Las Vegas, Nevada
2016 Poland Open 14th at 86 kg
Loss	26–17	(Turkey) Fırat Binici	3–6	June 15–17, 2016	2016 Poland Open	Spala, Poland
2015 Bill Farrell International Open DNP at 86 kg
Loss	26–16	(United States) Richard Perry	7–8	November 5–7, 2015	2015 Bill Farrell International Open	(United States) New York City, New York
Win	26–15	(United States) Tyler Caldwell	7–4	November 5–7, 2015	2015 Bill Farrell International Open	(United States) New York City, New York
Win	25–15	(United States) Tyrel Todd	11–6	November 5–7, 2015	2015 Bill Farrell International Open	(United States) New York City, New York
Win	24–15	(Iran) Alireza Asadinia	Fall	November 5–7, 2015	2015 Bill Farrell International Open	(United States) New York City, New York
Loss	23–15	(United States) Ryan Loder	12–16	November 5–7, 2015	2015 Bill Farrell International Open	(United States) New York City, New York
Win	23–14	(South Korea) Gwon Hyeok-beom	9–5	November 5–7, 2015	2015 Bill Farrell International Open	(United States) New York City, New York
2015 US University Nationals 4th at 86 kg
Loss	22–14	(United States) Ryan Loder	5–5	May 28–31, 2015	2015 US University National Championships	(United States) Akron, Ohio
Win	22–13	(United States) Sam Brooks	7–7	May 28–31, 2015	2015 US University National Championships	(United States) Akron, Ohio
Win	21–13	(United States) Aaron Studebaker	TF 10–0	May 28–31, 2015	2015 US University National Championships	(United States) Akron, Ohio
Win	20–13	(United States) Glenn Climmons	8–5	May 28–31, 2015	2015 US University National Championships	(United States) Akron, Ohio
Loss	19–13	(United States) Hayden Zillmer	5–8	May 28–31, 2015	2015 US University National Championships	(United States) Akron, Ohio
Win	19–12	(United States) Montrail Johnson	TF 10–0	May 28–31, 2015	2015 US University National Championships	(United States) Akron, Ohio
Win	18–12	(United States) Nicholas Veling	TF 12–2	May 28–31, 2015	2015 US University National Championships	(United States) Akron, Ohio
Win	17–12	(United States) Lawrence Thomas	8–4	May 28–31, 2015	2015 US University National Championships	(United States) Akron, Ohio
2015 Northern Plains DNP at 86 kg
Loss	16–12	(United States) Victor Terrell	3–7	May 14–16, 2015	2015 Northern Plains Regional Championships	(United States) Waterloo, Iowa
Win	16–11	(United States) Cody Caldwell	TF 12–1	May 14–16, 2015	2015 Northern Plains Regional Championships	(United States) Waterloo, Iowa
Win	15–11	(United States) Dane Pestano	TF 10–0	May 14–16, 2015	2015 Northern Plains Regional Championships	(United States) Waterloo, Iowa
2015 ASICS US Nationals DNP at 86 kg
Loss	14–11	(United States) Richard Perry	Fall	May 5–9, 2015	2015 ASICS US Senior Nationals	(United States) Las Vegas, Nevada
Win	14–10	(United States) Robert Hamlin	6–5	May 5–9, 2015	2015 ASICS US Senior Nationals	(United States) Las Vegas, Nevada
Win	13–10	(United States) Adam Fierro	7–2	May 5–9, 2015	2015 ASICS US Senior Nationals	(United States) Las Vegas, Nevada
Loss	12–10	(United States) Deron Winn	1–7	May 5–9, 2015	2015 ASICS US Senior Nationals	(United States) Las Vegas, Nevada
Win	12–9	(United States) Quentin Wright	Fall	May 5–9, 2015	2015 ASICS US Senior Nationals	(United States) Las Vegas, Nevada
2014 US World Team Trials DNP at 86 kg
Loss	11–9	(United States) Enock Francois	Fall	May 29 – June 1, 2014	2014 US World Team Trials	(United States) Madison, Wisconsin
Loss	11–8	(United States) Robert Hamlin	4–7	May 29 – June 1, 2014	2014 US World Team Trials	(United States) Madison, Wisconsin
2014 University Nationals 6th at 86 kg
Loss	11–7	(United States) Chris Perry	4–10	May 22–25, 2014	2014 US University National Championships	(United States) Akron, Ohio
Win	11–6	(United States) John Lampe	TF 10–0	May 22–25, 2014	2014 US University National Championships	(United States) Akron, Ohio
Win	10–6	(United States) Kenneth Courts	17–13	May 22–25, 2014	2014 US University National Championships	(United States) Akron, Ohio
Win	9–6	(United States) Rory Bonner	TF 11–1	May 22–25, 2014	2014 US University National Championships	(United States) Akron, Ohio
Win	8–6	(United States) Trent Noon	6–4	May 22–25, 2014	2014 US University National Championships	(United States) Akron, Ohio
2014 Northern Plains Regionals (gold) at 86 kg
Win	7–6	(United States) Bruce Toal	TF 11–1	May 8–10, 2014	2014 Northern Plains Regional Championships	(United States) Waterloo, Iowa
Win	6–6	(United States) Justin Koethe	TF 11–0	May 8–10, 2014	2014 Northern Plains Regional Championships	(United States) Waterloo, Iowa
Win	5–6	(United States) Dan Olsen	Fall	May 8–10, 2014	2014 Northern Plains Regional Championships	(United States) Waterloo, Iowa
2012 NYAC International DNP at 84 kg
Loss	4–6	(Canada) Tamerlan Tagziev	0–5, 0–5	November 8–10, 2012	2012 NYAC Holiday International Open	(United States) New York City, New York
Win	4–5	(Canada) Mathieu Deschatelets	4–1, 6–0	November 8–10, 2012	2012 NYAC Holiday International Open	(United States) New York City, New York
Loss	3–5	(Russia) Selim Yaşar	0–3, 2–1, 0–1	November 8–10, 2012	2012 NYAC Holiday International Open	(United States) New York City, New York
2011 US OTT Qualifier DNP at 84 kg
Loss	3–4	(United States) Evan Brown	1–0, 0–1, 0–4	December 3, 2011	2011 US Olympic Team Trials Qualifier	(United States) Las Vegas, Nevada
Win	3–3	(United States) Cody Powers	Fall	December 3, 2011	2011 US Olympic Team Trials Qualifier	(United States) Las Vegas, Nevada
Loss	2–3	(Nigeria) Kamaru Usman	1–1, 3–3, 0–4	December 3, 2011	2011 US Olympic Team Trials Qualifier	(United States) Las Vegas, Nevada
2011 NYAC International DNP at 84 kg
Loss	2–2	(United States) Kurt Brenner	1–3, 4–0, 3–5	November 11–13, 2011	2011 NYAC Holiday International Open	(United States) New York City, New York
Win	2–1	(United States) Eyad Abujaradeh	1–0, 5–0	November 11–13, 2011	2011 NYAC Holiday International Open	(United States) New York City, New York
Loss	1–1	(United States) Bryce Hasseman	1–1, 0–4	November 11–13, 2011	2011 NYAC Holiday International Open	(United States) New York City, New York
Win	1–0	(United Kingdom) Nathanael Ackerman	1–0, 4–3	November 11–13, 2011	2011 NYAC Holiday International Open	(United States) New York City, New York

== NCAA record ==
NCAA Division I Record
Res.	Record	Opponent	Score	Date	Event
End of 2016-2017 Season (junior year)
Win	17–4	Drew Foster	9–5	January 20, 2017	Northern Iowa - Iowa State Dual
Win	16–4	Daniel Chaid	6–4	January 14, 2017	Iowa State - North Carolina Dual
Win	15–4	Conner Small	MD 19–7	January 6, 2017	Arizona State - Iowa State Dual
Win	14–4	Casey Crawford	Fall	November 13, 2016	Harold Nichols Open
Win	13–4	Tyler McNutt	Fall	November 6, 2016	Iowa State - North Dakota State Dual
Win	12–4	Nate Rotert	8–6	November 4, 2016	Iowa State - South Dakota State Dual
Start of 2016-2017 Season (junior year)
End of 2015-2016 Season (sophomore year)
2016 NCAA Championships 5th at 197 lbs
Win	11–4	Jared Haught	Fall	March 15–17, 2016	2016 NCAA Division I Wrestling Championships
Loss	10–4	Nathan Burak	SV-1 1-3	March 15–17, 2016	2016 NCAA Division I Wrestling Championships
Win	10–3	Brett Harner	3-2	March 15–17, 2016	2016 NCAA Division I Wrestling Championships
Win	9–3	Shawn Scott	5-3	March 15–17, 2016	2016 NCAA Division I Wrestling Championships
Loss	8–3	Brett Pfarr	MD 3-12	March 15–17, 2016	2016 NCAA Division I Wrestling Championships
Win	8–2	Jared Haught	TB-1 Fall	March 15–17, 2016	2016 NCAA Division I Wrestling Championships
Win	7–2	Phil Wellington	SV-1 3-1	March 15–17, 2016	2016 NCAA Division I Wrestling Championships
2016 Big 12 Championships (bronze) at 197 lbs
Win	6–2	Trent Noon	3–1	March 3–6, 2016	2016 Big 12 Conference Championships
Win	5–2	Derek Thomas	4–1	March 3–6, 2016	2016 Big 12 Conference Championships
Loss	4–2	Preston Weigel	2–6	March 3–6, 2016	2016 Big 12 Conference Championships
Win	4–1	Jake Smith	4–1	March 3–6, 2016	2016 Big 12 Conference Championships
Win	3–1	Brad Johnson	8–5	March 3–6, 2016	2016 Big 12 Conference Championships
Loss	2–1	Brett Pfarr	MD 1–12	February 19, 2016	Iowa State - Minnesota Dual
Win	2–0	Bubba Scheffel	5–4	February 14, 2016	West Virginia - Iowa State Dual
Win	1–0	Cody Krumwiede	5–2	February 5, 2016	Iowa State - Northern Iowa Dual
Start of 2015-2016 Season (sophomore year)
End of 2014-2015 Season (freshman year)

=== Stats ===
Season	Year	School	Rank	Weigh Class	Record	Win	Bonus
2017	Junior	Iowa State University	#7 (DNQ)	184	7–0	100.00%	57.14%
2016	Sophomore	Iowa State University	#5 (5th)	197	11–4	73.33%	13.33%
2015	Freshman	Iowa Central Community College	#1 (NJCAA)	197	10–1	90.91%	36-36%
Career					28–5	84.85%	30.30%
