= Bo Nickal =

American wrestler and mixed martial artist (born 1996)

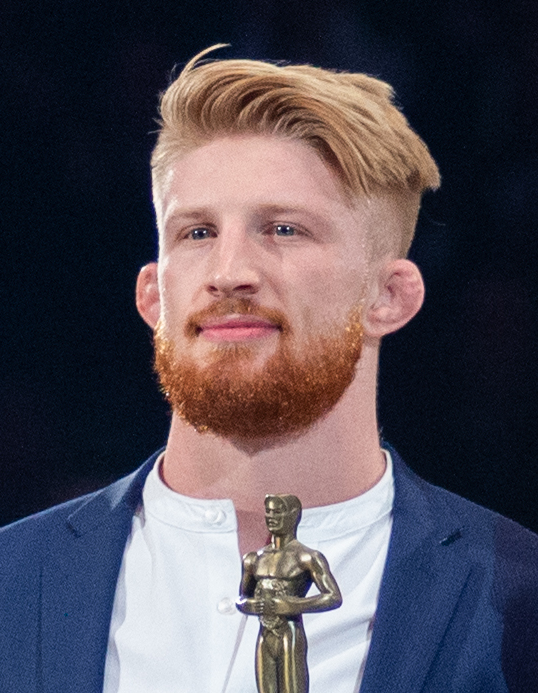
- Nickal in 2020
- Born: Bo Dean Nickal; January 14, 1996 (age 30); Rifle, Colorado, U.S.
- Height: 6 ft 1 in (1.85 m)
- Weight: 185 lb (84 kg; 13 st 3 lb)
- Division: Middleweight (2022–present)
- Reach: 75 in (191 cm)
- Style: Wrestling
- Stance: Southpaw
- Fighting out of: State College, Pennsylvania, U.S.
- Team: American Top Team
- Rank: Purple belt in Brazilian Jiu-Jitsu
- Wrestling: NCAA Division I Wrestling
- Years active: 2022–present

Mixed martial arts record
- Total: 10
- Wins: 9
- By knockout: 4
- By submission: 4
- By decision: 1
- Losses: 1
- By knockout: 1

Amateur record
- Total: 2
- Wins: 2
- By knockout: 1
- By submission: 1
- Losses: 0

Other information
- University: Pennsylvania State University
- Notable school: Allen High School (TX)
- Website: bonickal.com
- Mixed martial arts record from Sherdog
Medal record
Men's freestyle wrestling
Representing United States
U23 World Championships
Gold medal – first place	2019 Budapest	92 kg
US National Championships
Gold medal – first place	2019 Las Vegas	92 kg
Men's collegiate wrestling
Representing the Penn State Nittany Lions
NCAA Division I Championships
Gold medal – first place	2017 St. Louis	184 lb
Gold medal – first place	2018 Cleveland	184 lb
Gold medal – first place	2019 Pittsburgh	197 lb
Silver medal – second place	2016 New York	174 lb
Big Ten Championships
Gold medal – first place	2016 Iowa City	174 lb
Gold medal – first place	2018 East Lansing	184 lb
Gold medal – first place	2019 Minneapolis	197 lb
Bronze medal – third place	2017 Bloomington	184 lb

Bo Dean Nickal (born January 14, 1996) is an American professional mixed martial artist, freestyle wrestler, and graduated folkstyle wrestler who currently competes in the middleweight division of the Ultimate Fighting Championship (UFC). He also competes in the light heavyweight division of Real American Freestyle (RAF), where he was the inaugural RAF Light Heavyweight Champion. As of October 24, 2026, he is #13 in the Meta UFC middleweight rankings.

In freestyle wrestling, he claimed the 2019 U23 World Championship and the US Open national championship, and was a finalist at the 2020 US Olympic Team Trials and a Final X contestant in 2019. As a collegiate wrestler, Nickal was a three-time NCAA Division I national champion (finalist in 2016) and a three-time Big Ten Conference champion out of Pennsylvania State University.

Considered one of the most accomplished Nittany Lions of all time, Nickal earned the 2019 Dan Hodge Trophy as the nation's most outstanding collegiate wrestler, was a two-time Schalles Award winner as the nation's best pinner and was also named the 2019 Big Ten Athlete of the Year.

== Wrestling career ==
=== Background and high school ===
Nickal was born in Rifle, Colorado, but moved to Wyoming at a young age, where he started wrestling around five or six years old. In fifth grade, he moved to Rio Rancho, New Mexico. Nickal made the varsity high school team while in eighth grade and placed second at the New Mexico state tournament that same season.

As a high school freshman, he moved once again, now to Allen High School in Allen, Texas. He placed second at the Texas state tournament his freshman year, and then won every state tournament he competed in from his sophomore-year onward, becoming a three-time Texas state champion. As a junior, he placed fifth at the 2013 U17 World Championships in freestyle. After finishing his junior year, Nickal committed to wrestle as a Nittany Lion at the Pennsylvania State University. He graduated from high school with a 183–7 record, including 131 pins, and was the pound-for-pound ninth-ranked wrestler in the nation.

=== Pennsylvania State University ===
==== 2014–2015 ====
Nickal opted to compete under a redshirt during his first collegiate year, compiling a 15–2 record in open tournaments while wrestling unattached at 174 pounds.

==== 2015–2016 ====
Entering his freshman season ranked fourteenth in the country, Nickal won his first eighteen matches, claiming titles from the Nittany Lion Open and the Southern Scuffle and notable victories over returning NCAA runner-up Brian Realbuto, multiple DI All-Americans in Zach Epperly, Bryce Hammond and Ethan Ramos, and future NCAA champion Myles Martin. In his nineteenth match, Nickal, now the top-ranked 174-pounder in the country, was defeated by Nate Jackson on points, ending his streak. Afterwards, Nickal bounced back with eight straight wins, including another one over Martin, to finish the regular season with a record of 26–1. At the Big Ten Conference Championships, Nickal claimed three bonus point-victories, including a fall over Martin and a major over Zac Brunson in the finale. Nickal entered the NCAA's as the top-seed, defeating his first three opponents to make the semifinals, where he avenged his regular season loss to Nate Jackson on points, advancing to the finals. In the finals, Nickal faced the eleventh seed in Myles Martin, whom he had already defeated three times earlier, but was defeated by the opposition in a close and frenetic upset, claiming runner-up honors.

Nickal then went up to 86 kilograms for the 2016 US Last Chance World Trials Qualifier (freestyle) in April, where he placed fourth after recording a 5–2 record. He then attempted to make the 2016 U20 US World Team, but was stopped by Zahid Valencia.

==== 2016–2017 ====
As a sophomore, Nickal moved up to the 184 pounds division. During his unbeaten regular season, Nickal pinned his way to the Keystone Classic title and went 14–0 in dual meets, dominantly avenging his NCAA championship loss to Myles Martin, and also including wins over returning NCAA runner-up TJ Dudley and returning All-Americans Sammy Brooks and Nolan Boyd (both by fall). In the postseason, Nickal was upset in the semifinals of the Big Ten Championships by rival Myles Martin, but came back to place third, beating TJ Dudley for the second time. At the NCAA's, Nickal got a technical fall in the first round and three straight falls to make his second finals, notably pinning Dudley and Sammy Brooks. In the finale, Nickal faced undefeated-in-the-season and defending two-time NCAA champion Gabe Dean, whom he was able to edge by a point, claiming his first NCAA title and denying Dean his third.

Fresh off his first collegiate championship, Nickal went back up to 86 kilos to place fourth at the US Freestyle Open, going 4–2.

==== 2017–2018 ====
As a junior, Nickal compiled 23 wins and no losses during regular season, with 21 bonus–point victories, claimed multiple tournament titles and wins over the likes of Domenic Abounader and his nemesis Myles Martin. At the Big Ten Championships, Nickal claimed his second title by beating Martin in the finale, advancing to the NCAAs as the favorite top–seed. At the National tournament, he earned notable wins over '16 MAC champion Jordan Ellingwood, freshman phenom from Cornell Max Dean and Michigan's Domenic Abounader to make the finale, where he scored one of his signature pins in his career over Myles Martin, ending the rivalry, claiming his second NCAA title and clinching the team title for PSU. Due to his dominance, he was awarded the NCAA Championship Outstanding Wrestler award (MVP) and the prestigious Schalles Award as the nation's top pinner.

==== 2018–2019 ====
As a redshirt senior, Nickal moved up once again to 197 pounds. At this new weight class, he comfortably won the Big Ten Conference Championship for the second time consecutively and third time overall. At his last NCAA tournament, he dominated all three matches to get to the final, pinning his first two opponents and getting a major in the semifinals. In the finals, Nickal defeated the second seeded Kollin Moore by points (5-1) to claim the NCAA title, becoming one of the four Penn State wrestlers to win three NCAA National Championships and the third one (along with David Taylor and Jason Nolf) to be a four-time NCAA Finalist. At the end of the season, he was awarded the Dan Hodge Trophy as nation's best college wrestler and the Schalles Award (for the second time consecutively) as US' top pinner. He was also named 2019 Co-Big Ten wrestler of the Year, Penn State Male Athlete of the Year, and Big Ten Male Athlete of the Year.

=== Freestyle career ===
==== 2019 ====
Once his final run in collegiate wrestling was over, Nickal immediately turned his focus solely to freestyle. Going back to the style after two years, Nickal competed at the US Open, bulking up to 92 kilograms instead of going down to 86 kilos due to teammate David Taylor being the returning World Champion in the weight class. He walked through his competition, stopping five opponents (three by technical fall and two by fall) and earning the championship.

After winning the US Open, Nickal automatically advanced to the finals of the US World Team Trials Challenge Tournament, in which he faced Michael Macchiavello in a best-of-three rematch. He dominated the first match winning by technical fall (10–0) and in the second match he would outscore his opponent 5–0, without letting him to score a point in either match.

Nickal wrestled in two straight matches against returning World Champion J'den Cox for the spot to represent the United States at the 2019 World Championships. In the first match, he was outscored 2–4 and wasn't able to score offensively, and in the second, he wasn't able to score a single point, while Cox scored 5 of his own, losing the series.

As a 23-year old Final X contestant, Nickal had the right to compete at the US U23 World Team Trials against the Challenge Tournament winner, Jakob Woodley. The special wrestle-offs took place during the Fargo Nationals. Nickal dominated 12–4 in the first match and 8–2 in the second match, earning the right to represent United States at the U23 World Championships.

At the U23 World Championships, Nickal defeated three opponents (one by fall, one by technical fall and one by points) including Shamil Zubairov, the returning champion, to get to the finals, where he faced 2018 Russian National champion Batyrbek Tsakulov (whom he had lost to at the 2013 Cadet World Championships). Nickal was able to avenge his loss with a 12–2 technical fall victory to earn the championship.

==== 2020 ====
By the start of 2020, Nickal moved up to 97 kilograms in an attempt to take out reigning Olympic Gold medalist Kyle Snyder. He effortlessly passed the first round by technical fall before facing Mohammad Hossein Mohammadian (winner of the championship), who would nullify Nickal to a 0–10 technical fall, marking the first time he had been defeated in such fashion in freestyle (since graduating) or college. In the consolation bracket, he would also have a tough time, as he had a close match with Alisher Yergali in which he was down 11–12 but was able to secure a last second takedown and earn a 13–12 point-victory. Next in the bracket was Kyle Snyder, however, Nickal did not appear on the mat, forcing the match to be ruled as a forfeit victory for Snyder and also eliminating Nickal from the tournament, placing seventh.

As a 2019 U23 World Champion, Nickal qualified for the 2020 US Olympic Team Trials. He was scheduled to compete at the event on April, however, it was postponed for 2021 due to the coronavirus pandemic along with the 2020 Summer Olympics. As a champion at a non-olympic weight, Nickal was supposed to decide whether he was going to compete at 86 or 97 kilograms, but this decision never became public as the events were postponed. On September 21, he announced that he would compete at 86 kilograms in 2021.

Nickal returned to the mats against Alex Dieringer on September 19, at the NLWC I, making his debut at 86 kilograms since completely crossing over. Dieringer scored the first point via push-out early in the first period, however, he was put on the shot-clock due to passivity with 1 minute and 30 seconds left on the match. Nickal tied it up after defending the attacks of his opponent, earning a point and therefore the criteria as the last one to do so. He was able to earn the victory via criteria after neither of them were able to score more points. Nickal was later scheduled to wrestle 2020 US National runner-up Nate Jackson on November 24, at the NLWC III, but was removed from the card a day before the event.

==== 2021 ====
After a somewhat inactive previous year, Nickal wrestled two-time NCAA Division I National Champion Gabe Dean in a rematch from their 2017 NCAA championship match, on February 23, at the NLWC V. After a scramble-full match, Nickal was defeated by Dean in a close bout.

In early April, Nickal competed at the rescheduled US Olympic Team Trials as the sixth seed, in an attempt to represent the United States at the 2020 Summer Olympics. In the challenge tournament Nickal defeated '21 NCAA champion from Penn State Carter Starocci (round of 16), '19 US Open champion and third-seeded Pat Downey (quarterfinals), and '19 US National champion Zahid Valencia (semifinals). In the best–of–three finals, Nickal faced fellow Penn State legend and '18 World Champion David Taylor. Nickal lost twice by scores of 0–4 and 0–6, failing to make the US Olympic Team and break Taylor's 45–match win streak. Taylor would go on to claim the gold medal at the Summer Olympics. In regards to their close relationship, Taylor then stated:

"It was a weird emotion," Taylor said. "We had a discussion leading up to it, and we have such a deep room in the wrestling club, especially at 86 kilos, so we're challenged every single day and none of us would be where we are without each other. Bo's amazing, and I wouldn't be where I am without Bo."

== Mixed martial arts career ==
=== Early career ===
On November 10, 2019, it was announced that Nickal had signed an MMA management deal with First Round Management, expecting to make the transition to the sport. It was also announced that Nickal had serious plans on partnering with Dan Lambert and opening a new American Top Team facility at Pleasant Gap, Pennsylvania. The building process started on October 23, 2020, and the gym became active on July 2, 2021.

After the 2020 US Olympic Trials for wrestling, Nickal made his amateur mixed martial arts debut against David Conley on September 24, 2021, winning via arm-triangle choke submission in round one. In his next bout, Nickal scored a one-punch knockout over Billy Goode on November 5, 2021.

Nickal made his professional MMA debut in the middleweight division against John Noland on June 3, 2022, at the Greater Richmond Convention Center in Richmond, Virginia as part of Jorge Masvidal's iKon FC event. Nickal won the fight via knockout less than a minute into the first round.

=== Dana White's Contender Series ===
For his second professional match, Nickal faced Zachary Borrego on August 9, 2022, at Dana White's Contender Series 49. At weight ins, Borrego missed weight by 1.5 pounds, coming in at 187.5 lbs. The bout proceeded at catchweight and Borrego was fined a percentage of his purse, which went to Nickal. He won the fight via rear-naked choke submission early in the first round. Nickal was not awarded a contract due to his inexperience, with UFC president Dana White instead opting to arrange another fight for Nickal on the Contender Series.

Nickal faced Donovan Beard at Dana White's Contender Series 56 on September 27, 2022. Nickal submitted Beard in 52 seconds via triangle choke, once again not absorbing a significant strike. After this performance, Nickal was awarded his first UFC contract.

=== Ultimate Fighting Championship ===
Nickal was scheduled to make his UFC debut against Jamie Pickett on December 10, 2022, at UFC 282. However, Nickal withdrew due to injury. The bout was rescheduled for March 4, 2023, at UFC 285. He won the fight via an arm-triangle choke submission in the first round. This win earned him the Performance of the Night award. Following the fight, Pickett's manager announced plans to appeal the fight to the Nevada State Athletic Commission on the grounds that Nickal took advantage of an uncalled groin shot to win the fight.

Nickal was scheduled to face Tresean Gore on July 8, 2023, at UFC 290. However, Gore withdrew just days before the event due to a torn ligament in his wrist. He was replaced by promotional newcomer Val Woodburn. Nickal finished the bout 38 seconds into the first round via TKO stoppage.

Nickal faced Cody Brundage on April 13, 2024, at UFC 300. He won the fight by rear-naked choke submission in the second round.

Nickal faced Paul Craig on November 16, 2024, at UFC 309. He won the fight by unanimous decision.

Nickal faced former ONE Middleweight and ONE Light Heavyweight World Champion Reinier de Ridder on May 3, 2025, at UFC on ESPN 67. He lost the fight by knockout in the second round after a knee to the body.

Nickal faced Rodolfo Vieira on November 15, 2025, at UFC 322. He won the fight by head kick knockout in the third round. This fight earned him another Performance of the Night award.

Nickal faced Kyle Daukaus on June 14, 2026 at UFC Freedom 250. He won the fight by technical knockout in the first round.

Nickal was scheduled to face Joe Pyfer on December 12, 2026 at UFC 335. However, the bout was rescheduled to headline UFC Fight Night 299 on February 13, 2027 in Cleveland.

== Submission grappling career ==
Nickal competed in the first submission grappling match of his combat sports career at Third Coast Grappling 3 on December 7, 2019, when he faced Gordon Ryan in the main event. Nickal was submitted with a triangle choke.

Nickal represented iKon FC in a team grappling tournament at UFC Fight Pass Invitational 2 on July 3, 2022. He fought Eliot Kelly to a draw in the opening round and fought Oliver Taza to a draw in the final, with iKon FC taking second place in the tournament.

== Personal life ==
Nickal is the son of Jason and Sandy Nickal. His parents were both college athletes, as Sandy played basketball at San Diego State University and Jason played football at Chadron State College. Jason coached Nickal as a youth until he went off to college at Penn State. In 2026, Jason was reported as being head wrestling coach at State College High School. His mother Sandy is a former amateur boxer.

Nickal is a Christian. He stated his faith in God helps alleviate the pressure he feels in competition, "Win or lose, I'm still the same person and my family loves me and I still serve a great God, and, you know, that's just part of His plan for my life is to wrestle. So I do feel like it's important, but at the end of the day that's not what defines me. I just have placed my identity in Jesus Christ and I go out there and compete freely and the best I can every match." As a child, his favorite wrestler was two-time Olympic Gold Medalist John Smith. Apart from wrestling, he is also an enthusiast of spikeball and likes American football, his favorite player being former Detroit Lions player Barry Sanders.

Nickal married Maddie Holmberg, daughter of NFL lineback Rob Holmberg, on December 12, 2020. The couple had their second child in 2025.

Nickal is a friend of President Donald Trump. The two met in 2019 when Nickal visited the White House. On the first day of the 2026 Republican National Convention, Nickal and fellow UFC fighter Justin Gaethje introduced Trump together.

While on the John Rondi Show, Bo Nickal has claimed to be able to read minds and perceive people’s thoughts, as well as being capable of reaching a higher level of self awareness.

== Championships and accomplishments ==
=== Mixed martial arts ===
- Ultimate Fighting Championship
  - Performance of the Night (Two times) vs. Jamie Pickett and Rodolfo Vieira
  - UFC Honors Awards
    - 2023: Fan's Choice Debut of the Year Winner vs. Jamie Pickett
  - UFC.com Awards
    - 2023: Ranked #2 Newcomer of the Year
- ESPN
  - 2023 Rookie of the Year
- GiveMeSport
  - 2023 UFC Debut Fighter of the Year

== Mixed martial arts record ==
Professional record breakdown
10 matches	9 wins	1 loss
By knockout	4	1
By submission	4	0
By decision	1	0

Res.	Record	Opponent	Method	Event	Date	Round	Time	Location	Notes
Win	9–1	Kyle Daukaus	TKO (punches and elbows)	UFC Freedom 250	June 14, 2026	1	4:34	Washington, D.C., United States	
Win	8–1	Rodolfo Vieira	KO (head kick)	UFC 322	November 15, 2025	3	2:24	New York City, New York, United States	Performance of the Night.
Loss	7–1	Reinier de Ridder	TKO (knee to the body)	UFC on ESPN: Sandhagen vs. Figueiredo	May 3, 2025	2	1:53	Des Moines, Iowa, United States	
Win	7–0	Paul Craig	Decision (unanimous)	UFC 309	November 16, 2024	3	5:00	New York City, New York, United States	
Win	6–0	Cody Brundage	Submission (rear-naked choke)	UFC 300	April 13, 2024	2	3:38	Las Vegas, Nevada, United States	
Win	5–0	Val Woodburn	TKO (punches)	UFC 290	July 8, 2023	1	0:38	Las Vegas, Nevada, United States	
Win	4–0	Jamie Pickett	Submission (arm-triangle choke)	UFC 285	March 4, 2023	1	2:54	Las Vegas, Nevada, United States	Performance of the Night.
Win	3–0	Donovan Beard	Submission (triangle choke)	Dana White's Contender Series 56	September 27, 2022	1	0:52	Las Vegas, Nevada, United States	
Win	2–0	Zachary Borrego	Submission (rear-naked choke)	Dana White's Contender Series 49	August 9, 2022	1	1:02	Las Vegas, Nevada, United States	Catchweight (187.5 lb) bout; Borrego missed weight.
Win	1–0	John Noland	KO (punches)	Jorge Masvidal's iKON FC 3	June 3, 2022	1	0:33	Richmond, Virginia, United States	Middleweight debut.

Amateur record breakdown		
2 matches	2 wins	0 losses
By knockout	1	0
By submission	1	0

Res.	Record	Opponent	Method	Event	Date	Round	Time	Location	Notes
Win	2–0	Billy Goode	KO (punch)	Island Fights 70	November 5, 2021	1	0:56	Pensacola, Florida, United States	
Win	1–0	David Conley	Submission (guillotine choke)	Island Fights 69	September 24, 2021	1	2:02	Pensacola, Florida, United States	

== Freestyle record ==
Senior freestyle wrestling matches
Res.	Record	Opponent	Score	Date	Event	Location
RAF 01 205 lb (Won Inaugural RAF Light Heavyweight Championship)
Win	29–10	(United States) Jacob Cardenas	6–4	August 30, 2025	RAF 01	(United States) Cleveland, Ohio
2020 US Olympic Team Trials (silver) at 86 kg
Loss	28–10	(United States) David Taylor	0–6	April 2–3, 2021	2020 US Olympic Team Trials	(United States) Fort Worth, Texas
Loss	28–9	(United States) David Taylor	0–4	April 2–3, 2021	2020 US Olympic Team Trials	(United States) Fort Worth, Texas
Win	28–8	(United States) Zahid Valencia	12–5	April 2–3, 2021	2020 US Olympic Team Trials	(United States) Fort Worth, Texas
Win	27–8	(United States) Pat Downey	TF 13–3	April 2–3, 2021	2020 US Olympic Team Trials	(United States) Fort Worth, Texas
Win	26–8	(United States) Carter Starocci	6–1	April 2–3, 2021	2020 US Olympic Team Trials	(United States) Fort Worth, Texas
Loss	25–8	(United States) Gabe Dean	2–3	February 23, 2021	NLWC V	(United States) State College, Pennsylvania
Win	25–7	(United States) Alex Dieringer	1–1	September 19, 2020	NLWC I	(United States) State College, Pennsylvania
2020 Matteo Pellicone Ranking Series 7th at 97 kg
Win	24–7	(Kazakhstan) Alisher Yergali	13–12	January 15–18, 2020	Matteo Pellicone Ranking Series 2020	Rome, Italy
Loss	23–7	(Iran) Mohammad Mohammadian	TF 0–10	January 15–18, 2020	Matteo Pellicone Ranking Series 2020	Rome, Italy
Win	23–6	(Germany) George Stark Serege	TF 11–1	January 15–18, 2020	Matteo Pellicone Ranking Series 2020	Rome, Italy
2019 U23 World Championships (gold) at 92 kg
Win	22–6	(Russia) Batyrbek Tsakulov	TF 12–2	October 30, 2019	2019 U23 World Championships	Budapest, Hungary
Win	21–6	(Azerbaijan) Shamil Zubairov	9–1	October 29, 2019	2019 U23 World Championships	Budapest, Hungary
Win	20–6	(Japan) Takumi Tanizaki	Fall	October 29, 2019	2019 U23 World Championships	Budapest, Hungary
Win	19–6	(Iran) Hossein Shahbazigazvar	TF 12–2	October 29, 2019	2019 U23 World Championships	Budapest, Hungary
2019 US U23 World Team Trials (gold) at 92 kg
Win	18–6	(United States) Jake Woodley	12–4	July 16, 2019	2019 Fargo Nationals (special wrestle-off)	(United States) Fargo, North Dakota
Win	17–6	(United States) Jake Woodley	8–2	July 16, 2019	2019 Fargo Nationals (special wrestle-off)	(United States) Fargo, North Dakota
2019 US World Team Trials (silver) at 92 kg
Loss	16–6	(United States) J'den Cox	0–5	June 8, 2019	2019 Final X: Rutgers	(United States) New Brunswick, New Jersey
Loss	16–5	(United States) J'den Cox	2–4	June 7, 2019	2019 Final X: Rutgers	(United States) New Brunswick, New Jersey
Win	16–4	(United States) Michael Macchiavello	5–0	May 19, 2019	2019 US World Team Trials Challenge Tournament	(United States) Lincoln, Nebraska
Win	15–4	(United States) Michael Macchiavello	TF 10–0	May 18, 2019	2019 US World Team Trials Challenge Tournament	(United States) Lincoln, Nebraska
2019 US Open (gold) at 92 kg
Win	14–4	(United States) Hayden Zillmer	TF 13–3	April 24–27, 2019	2019 US Open National Championships	(United States) Las Vegas, Nevada
Win	13–4	(United States) Michael Macchiavello	TF 14–4	April 24–27, 2019	2019 US Open National Championships	(United States) Las Vegas, Nevada
Win	12–4	(United States) Scottie Boykin	TF 10–0	April 24–27, 2019	2019 US Open National Championships	(United States) Las Vegas, Nevada
Win	11–4	(United States) Patrick Rhoads	Fall	April 24–27, 2019	2019 US Open National Championships	(United States) Las Vegas, Nevada
Win	10–4	(United States) Jamal Lewis	Fall	April 24–27, 2019	2019 US Open National Championships	(United States) Las Vegas, Nevada
2017 US Open 4th at 86 kg
Loss	9–4	(United States) Nick Heflin	8–10	April 29, 2017	2017 US Open National Championships	(United States) Las Vegas, Nevada
Win	9–3	(United States) Pat Downey	TF 12–2	April 29, 2017	2017 US Open National Championships	(United States) Las Vegas, Nevada
Loss	8–3	(United States) Richard Perry	8–10	April 29, 2017	2017 US Open National Championships	(United States) Las Vegas, Nevada
Win	8–2	(United States) John Staudenmayer	TF 10–0	April 28, 2017	2017 US Open National Championships	(United States) Las Vegas, Nevada
Win	7–2	(United States) Timmy McCall	TF 10–0	April 28, 2017	2017 US Open National Championships	(United States) Las Vegas, Nevada
Win	6–2	(United States) Randy Keesler	TF 10–0	April 28, 2017	2017 US Open National Championships	(United States) Las Vegas, Nevada
2016 US Last Chance OTT 4th at 86 kg
Loss	5–2	(United States) Nick Heflin	Fall	April 3, 2016	2016 US Last Chance Olympic Team Trials Qualifier	(United States) Cedar Falls, Iowa
Win	5–1	(United States) Robert Hamlin	10–8	April 3, 2016	2016 US Last Chance Olympic Team Trials Qualifier	(United States) Cedar Falls, Iowa
Win	4–1	(United States) Victor Terrell	TF 10–0	April 3, 2016	2016 US Last Chance Olympic Team Trials Qualifier	(United States) Cedar Falls, Iowa
Win	3–1	(United States) Frank Richmond	14–10	April 3, 2016	2016 US Last Chance Olympic Team Trials Qualifier	(United States) Cedar Falls, Iowa
Loss	2–1	(United States) Kevin Steinhaus	TF 1–12	April 3, 2016	2016 US Last Chance Olympic Team Trials Qualifier	(United States) Cedar Falls, Iowa
Win	2–0	(United States) Austin Faunce	TF 10–0	April 3, 2016	2016 US Last Chance Olympic Team Trials Qualifier	(United States) Cedar Falls, Iowa
Win	1–0	(United States) Wesley Schultz	TF 10–0	April 3, 2016	2016 US Last Chance Olympic Team Trials Qualifier	(United States) Cedar Falls, Iowa

== NCAA record ==
NCAA Division I Record
Res.	Record	Opponent	Score	Date	Event
End of 2018–2019 Season (senior year)
2019 NCAA Championships (gold) at 197 lbs
Win	120–3	Kollin Moore	5–1	March 21–23, 2019	2019 NCAA Division I National Championships
Win	119–3	Patrick Brucki	Fall	March 21–23, 2019	2019 NCAA Division I National Championships
Win	118–3	Nathan Traxler	MD 14–4	March 21–23, 2019	2019 NCAA Division I National Championships
Win	117–3	Josh Hokit	Fall	March 21–23, 2019	2019 NCAA Division I National Championships
Win	116–3	Ethan Laird	Fall	March 21–23, 2019	2019 NCAA Division I National Championships
2019 Big Ten Conference (gold) at 197 lbs
Win	115–3	Kollin Moore	10–3	March 9–10, 2019	2019 Big Ten Conference Championships
Win	114–3	Eric Schultz	MD 10–2	March 9–10, 2019	2019 Big Ten Conference Championships
Win	113–3	Brad Wilton	TF 19–4	March 9–10, 2019	2019 Big Ten Conference Championships
Win	112–3	Brett Perry	Fall	February 24, 2019	Buffalo - Penn State Dual
Win	111–3	Matt Wroblewski	TF 19–3	February 17, 2019	Penn State- Illinois Dual
Win	110–3	Brad Wilton	Fall	February 15, 2019	Michigan State - Penn State Dual
Win	109–3	Kollin Moore	Fall	February 8, 2019	Penn State - Ohio State Dual
Win	108–3	Jackson Striggow	Fall	February 2, 2019	Michigan - Penn State Dual
Win	107–3	Kleimola Jake	Fall	January 27, 2019	Penn State - Indiana State Dual
Win	106–3	Christian Brunner	MD 17–6	January 25, 2019	Penn State - Purdue Dual
Win	105–3	Eric Schultz	8–6	January 20, 2019	Nebraska - Penn State Dual
Win	104–3	Beau Breske	MD 14–4	January 13, 2019	Wisconsin - Penn State Dual
Win	103–3	Zack Chakonis	Fall	January 11, 2019	Penn State - Northwestern Dual
2019 Southern Scuffle (gold) at 197 lbs
Win	102–3	Nathan Traxler	Fall	January 1–2, 2019	2019 Southern Scuffle
Win	101–3	Tom Sleigh	Fall	January 1–2, 2019	2019 Southern Scuffle
Win	100–3	Joshua Roetman	Fall	January 1–2, 2019	2019 Southern Scuffle
Win	99–3	Luke McGonigal	Fall	January 1–2, 2019	2019 Southern Scuffle
Win	98–3	Tyrie Houghton	Fall	January 1–2, 2019	2019 Southern Scuffle
Win	97–3	Austyn Harris	Fall	December 14, 2018	Arizona State - Penn State Dual
Win	96–3	Jake Jakobsen	TF 19–4	December 14, 2018	Lehigh - Penn State Dual
Win	95–3	Drew Phipps	MD 16–6	November 30, 2018	Penn State - Bucknell Dual
2018 Keystone Classic (gold) at 197 lbs
Win	94–3	Stephen Loiseau	MD 18–4	November 18, 2018	2018 Keystone Classic
Win	93–3	Ethan Laird	Fall	November 18, 2018	2018 Keystone Classic
Win	92–3	Benjamin Markulec	Fall	November 18, 2018	2018 Keystone Classic
Win	91–3	Shane Mast	Fall	November 11, 2018	Maryland - Ohio State Dual
Start of 2018–2019 Season (senior year)
End of 2017–2018 Season (junior year)
2018 NCAA Championships (gold) at 184 lbs
Win	90–3	Myles Martin	Fall	March 15–17, 2018	2018 NCAA Division I National Championships
Win	89–3	Domenic Abounader	6–3	March 15–17, 2018	2018 NCAA Division I National Championships
Win	88–3	Max Dean	13–7	March 15–17, 2018	2018 NCAA Division I National Championships
Win	87–3	Jordan Ellingwood	10–4	March 15–17, 2018	2018 NCAA Division I National Championships
Win	86–3	Martin Mueller	MD 16–4	March 15–17, 2018	2018 NCAA Division I National Championships
2018 Big Ten Conference (gold) at 184 lbs
Win	85–3	Myles Martin	7–4	March 3–4, 2018	2018 Big Ten Conference Championships
Win	83–3	Emery Parker	5–2	March 3–4, 2018	2018 Big Ten Conference Championships
Win	84–3	Brandon Krone	Fall	March 3–4, 2018	2018 Big Ten Conference Championships
Win	82–3	Brett Perry	Fall	February 18, 2018	Buffalo - Penn State Dual
Win	81–3	Mitch Bowman	Fall	February 10, 2018	Iowa - Penn State Dual
Win	80–3	Myles Martin	MD 10–2	February 3, 2018	Ohio State - Penn State Dual
Win	79–3	Nicholas Gravina	6–5	January 28, 2018	Penn State - Rutgers Dual
Win	78–3	Dylan Anderson	Fall	January 26, 2018	Minnesota - Penn State Dual
Win	77–3	Niko Capello	Fall	January 21, 2018	Penn State - Maryland Dual
Win	76–3	Max Lyon	Fall	January 19, 2018	Purdue - Penn State Dual
Win	75–3	Shwan Shadaia	Fall	January 14, 2018	Penn State -Michigan State Dual
Win	74–3	Domenic Abounader	5–2	January 12, 2018	Penn State - Michigan Dual
2018 Southern Scuffle (gold) at 184 lbs
Win	73–3	Drew Foster	MD 10–2	January 1–2, 2018	2018 Southern Scuffle
Win	72–3	Nick Renan	MD 12-4	January 1–2, 2018	2018 Southern Scuffle
Win	71–3	Stanley Smeltzer	Fall	January 1–2, 2018	2018 Southern Scuffle
Win	70–3	Austin Flores	Fall	January 1–2, 2018	2018 Southern Scuffle
Win	69–3	Nick Mosco	Fall	January 1–2, 2018	2018 Southern Scuffle
Win	68–3	Norman Conley	Fall	December 17, 2017	Indiana - Penn State Dual
Win	67–3	Ryan Preisch	TF 19–4	December 14, 2017	Penn State - Lehigh Dual
2017 Keystone Classic (gold) at 184 lbs
Win	66–3	Mitch Sliga	Fall	November 19, 2017	2017 Keystone Classic
Win	65–3	Josh Murphy	Fall	November 19, 2017	2017 Keystone Classic
Win	64–3	Kanon Dean	TF 24–9	November 19, 2017	2017 Keystone Classic
Win	63–3	Ben Wagner	Fall	November 19, 2017	2017 Keystone Classic
Win	62–3	Steve Schneider	MD 15–6	November 17, 2017	Penn State - Binghamton Dual
Win	61–3	Drew Phipps	TF 16–6	November 12, 2017	Bucknell - Penn State Dual
Win	60–3	Noah Steward	Fall	November 11, 2017	Army - Penn State Dual
Start of 2017–2018 Season (junior year)
End of 2016–2017 Season (sophomore year)
2017 NCAA Championships (gold) at 184 lbs
Win	59–3	Gabe Dean	4–3	March 16–18, 2017	2017 NCAA Division I National Championships
Win	58–3	Sammy Brooks	Fall	March 16–18, 2017	2017 NCAA Division I National Championships
Win	57–3	TJ Dudley	Fall	March 16–18, 2017	2017 NCAA Division I National Championships
Win	56–3	Steve Schneider	Fall	March 16–18, 2017	2017 NCAA Division I National Championships
Win	55–3	Mitch Sliga	TF 15–0	March 16–18, 2017	2017 NCAA Division I National Championships
2017 Big Ten Conference (bronze) at 184 lbs
Win	54–3	TJ Dudley	14–9	March 4–5, 2017	2017 Big Ten Conference Championships
Win	53–3	Emery Parker	8–2	March 4–5, 2017	2017 Big Ten Conference Championships
Loss	52–3	Myles Martin	4–6	March 4–5, 2017	2017 Big Ten Conference Championships
Win	52–2	Hunter Ritter	Fall	March 4–5, 2017	2017 Big Ten Conference Championships
Win	51–2	Nolan Boyd	Fall	February 19, 2017	Penn State- Oklahoma State Dual
Win	50–2	Idris White	Fall	February 12, 2017	Maryland - Penn State Dual
Win	49–2	Emery Parker	MD 18–5	February 10, 2017	Illinois -Penn State Dual
Win	48–2	Myles Martin	8–2	February 3, 2017	Penn State - Ohio State Dual
Win	47–2	Mitch Sliga	MD 10–1	Januany 29, 2017	Penn State - Northwestern Dual
Win	46–2	Hunter Ritter	Fall	January 27, 2017	Penn State - Wisconsin Dual
Win	45–2	Sammy Brooks	Fall	January 20, 2017	Penn State - Iowa Dual
Win	44–2	Nicholas Gravina	Fall	January 13, 2017	Rutgers - Penn State Dual
Win	43–2	TJ Dudley	10–5	January 8, 2017	Penn State - Nebraska Dual
Win	42–2	Robert Steveson	Fall	January 6, 2017	Penn State - Minnesota Dual
Win	41–2	Steve Schneider	TF 18–7	December 12, 2016	Binghamton - Penn State Dual
Win	40–2	Kyle Gentile	Fall	December 4, 2016	Lehigh - Bucknell Dual
2016 Keystone Classic (gold) at 184 lbs
Win	39–2	Mitch Sliga	Fall	November 20, 2016	2016 Keystone Classic
Win	38–2	Anthony Mancini	Fall	November 20, 2016	2016 Keystone Classic
Win	37–2	Kayne MacCallum	Fall	November 20, 2016	2016 Keystone Classic
Win	36–2	Elliot Antler	Fall	November 20, 2016	2016 Keystone Classic
Win	35–2	Austin Flores	Fall	November 13, 2016	Standford - Penn State Dual
Win	34–2	Samson Imonode	Fall	November 11, 2016	Penn State - Army Dual
Start of 2016–2017 Season (sophomore year)
End of 2015–2016 Season (freshman year)
2016 NCAA Championships (silver) at 174 lbs
Loss	33–2	Myles Martin	9–11	March 17–19, 2016	2016 NCAA Division I National Championships
Win	33–1	Nate Jackson	4–3	March 17–19, 2016	2016 NCAA Division I National Championships
Win	32–1	Chandler Rogers	MD 15–4	March 17–19, 2016	2016 NCAA Division I National Championships
Win	31–1	Micah Barnes	7–2	March 17–19, 2016	2016 NCAA Division I National Championships
Win	30–1	Josef Johnson	MD 10–2	March 17–19, 2016	2016 NCAA Division I National Championships
2016 Big Ten Conference (gold) at 174 lbs
Win	29–1	Zac Brunson	MD 18–9	March 5–6, 2016	2016 Big Ten Conference Championships
Win	28–1	Myles Martin	Fall	March 5–6, 2016	2016 Big Ten Conference Championships
Win	27–1	Phillip Bakuckas	MD 15–3	March 5–6, 2016	2016 Big Ten Conference Championships
Win	26–1	Hestin Lamons	TF 17–2	February 21, 2016	Oklahoma State - Penn State Dual
Win	25–1	Travis Curley	TF 24–9	Feb 13, 2016	Michigan State - Penn State Dual
Win	24–1	Gordon Wolf	MD 14–6	Feb 12, 2016	Penn State - Lehigh Dual
Win	23–1	Myles Martin	11–5	February 5, 2016	Ohio State - Penn State Dual
Win	22–1	Davonte Mahomes	INJ	January 31, 2016	Michigan - Penn State Dual
Win	21–1	Zac Brunson	Fall	Jan 23, 2016	Penn State - Illinois Dual
Win	20–1	Mitch Sliga	Fall	Jan 17, 2016	Penn State - Northwestern Dual
Win	19–1	Micah Barnes	10–3	January 15, 2016	Nebraska - Penn State Dual
Loss	18–1	Nate Jackson	6–7	January 12, 2016	Penn State - Indiana Dual
Win	18–0	Jacob Morrissey	TF 16–1	January 8, 2016	Penn State - Purdue Dual
2016 Southern Scuffle (gold) at 174 lbs
Win	17–0	Ethan Ramos	11–7	January 1–2, 2016	2016 Southern Scuffle
Win	16–0	Brian Realbuto	14–7	January 1–2, 2016	2016 Southern Scuffle
Win	15–0	Mike Ottinger	4–3	January 1–2, 2016	2016 Southern Scuffle
Win	14–0	Fox Baldwin	MD 15–6	January 1–2, 2016	2016 Southern Scuffle
Win	13–0	Movahedi Sohrab	TF 20–2	January 1–2, 2016	2016 Southern Scuffle
Win	12–0	Randy Roden	TF 17–1	January 1–2, 2016	2016 Southern Scuffle
Win	11–0	Wayne Stinson	Fall	December 19, 2015	Penn State - Rider Dual
Win	10–0	Ricky Robertson	MD 15–2	December 19, 2015	Wisconsin - Penn State Dual
2015 Nittany Lion Open (gold) at 174 lbs
Win	9–0	Myles Martin	4–3	December 6, 2015	2015 Nittany Lion Open
Win	8–0	Anthony Pafumi	Fall	December 6, 2015	2015 Nittany Lion Open
Win	7–0	Domenic Prezzia	Fall	December 6, 2015	2015 Nittany Lion Open
Win	6–0	Nick Stephani	TF 25–8	December 6, 2015	2015 Nittany Lion Open
Win	5–0	Graham Ratermann	Fall	December 6, 2015	2015 Nittany Lion Open
Win	4–0	Keaton Subjeck	MD 12–4	November 22, 2015	Penn State - Stanford Dual
Win	3–0	Bryce Hammond	Fall	November 20, 2015	Penn State – CSU Bakersfield Dual
Win	2–0	Zach Epperly	6–2	November 15, 2015	Penn State – Virginia State Dual
Win	1–0	Tyler Wood	TF 21–6	November 13, 2015	Lock Havon – Penn State Dual
Start of 2015–2016 Season (freshman year)

=== Stats ===
Season	Year	School	Rank	Weigh Class	Record	Win	Bonus
2019	Senior	Penn State University	#1 (1st)	197	30–0	100.00%	90.00%
2018	Junior	Penn State University	#1 (1st)	184	31–0	100.00%	74.19%
2017	Sophomore	Penn State University	#2 (1st)	184	26–1	96.30%	77.78%
2016	Freshman	Penn State University	#1 (2nd)	174	33–2	94.29%	65.71%
Career					120–3	97.65%	76.77%

== Submission grappling record ==
3 Matches, 0 Wins, 1 Loss (1 Submission), 2 Draws
Result	Rec.	Opponent	Method	Event	Division	Type	Year	Location
Draw	0–1–2	(Canada) Oliver Taza	Draw (time limit)	UFC Fight Pass Invitational 2	Open	Nogi	July 3, 2022	(United States) Las Vegas, Nevada
Draw	0–1–1	(United States) Elliot Kelly	Draw (time limit)	UFC Fight Pass Invitational 2	Open	Nogi	July 3, 2022	(United States) Las Vegas, Nevada
Loss	0–1	(United States) Gordon Ryan	Submission (triangle choke)	Third Coast Grappling 3	Superfight	Nogi	December 7, 2019	(United States) Houston, Texas

Achievements
New championship	1st RAF Light Heavyweight Champion; August 30, 2025 – February 27, 2026; Stripped	Vacant Title next held by Kyle Snyder
