= Bellator 272 =

Bellator mixed martial arts event in 2021

Bellator 272: Pettis vs. Horiguchi
- The poster for Bellator 272: Pettis vs. Horiguchi
- Promotion: Bellator MMA
- Date: December 3, 2021
- Venue: Mohegan Sun Arena
- City: Uncasville, Connecticut, United States

Event chronology
| Bellator 271: Cyborg vs. Kavanagh | Bellator 272: Pettis vs. Horiguchi | Bellator 273: Bader vs. Moldavsky |

Bellator 272: Pettis vs. Horiguchi was a mixed martial arts event produced by Bellator MMA that took place on December 3, 2021 at the Mohegan Sun Arena in Uncasville, Connecticut.

== Background ==
Sergio Pettis made his first defence of the Bellator Bantamweight World Championship after winning his first major promotional title in May when he defeated then-champ Juan Archuleta by unanimous decision in the main event of Bellator 258. Kyoji Horiguchi, meanwhile, competed under the Bellator banner for the first time as a rostered fighter on a multifight deal. In June 2019, Horiguchi was lent by RIZIN to Bellator for a one-off fight against Darrion Caldwell – a bout Horiguchi won by unanimous decision to become champion. He later vacated the title after Horiguchi suffered a knee injury that forced him to relinquish the title while he was recovering from surgery.

A featherweight bout between John de Jesus and Keoni Diggs was scheduled for this event. However, Diggs had to pull out for unknown reasons and was replaced by Kai Kamaka III.

A lightweight bout between Dan Moret and Mandel Nallo was scheduled for this event. Nallo subsequently pulled out of the bout and was replaced by Ricardo Seixas. Seixas would pull out of the bout for unknown reasons and was replaced by Spike Carlyle, with the bout being a catchweight bout at 160 lb.

A lightweight bout between Jay Jay Wilson and Alfie Davis was scheduled for this event, however Davis pulled out of the bout for unknown reasons.

At the weigh-ins, Jared Scoggins missed weight for his bout, weighing in at 140 pounds, 4 pounds over the bantamweight non-title fight limit. The bout proceeded at catchweight and Scoggins was fined 35% of his purse which went to his opponent Josh Hill.

== Results ==
Main Card (Showtime)
| Weight class | | | | Method | Round | Time | Notes |
|---|---|---|---|---|---|---|---|
| Bantamweight | Sergio Pettis (c) | def. | Kyoji Horiguchi | KO (spinning backfist) | 4 | 3:24 | (Note: For the Bellator Bantamweight World Championship.) |
| Featherweight | Jeremy Kennedy | def. | Emmanuel Sanchez | Decision (unanimous) (30–27, 30–27, 30–27) | 3 | 5:00 |
| Catchweight (140 lb) | Josh Hill | def. | Jared Scoggins | KO (punch) | 2 | 0:56 | (Note: Originally a bantamweight bout; Scoggins missed weight.) |
| Middleweight | Johnny Eblen | def. | Collin Huckbody | TKO (punches) | 1 | 1:11 |
Preliminary card (Youtube/Pluto TV)
| Lightweight | Alexandr Shabliy | def. | Bobby King | Decision (unanimous) (30–27, 30–27, 30–27) | 3 | 5:00 |
| Featherweight | Kai Kamaka III | def. | John de Jesus | Decision (unanimous) (29–28, 29–28, 29–28) | 3 | 5:00 |
| Welterweight | Levan Chokheli | def. | Vinicius de Jesus | Decision (unanimous) (29–28, 30–27, 30–27) | 3 | 5:00 |
| Lightweight | Justin Montalvo | def. | Jacob Bohn | Decision (unanimous) (29–27, 29–28, 29–28) | 3 | 5:00 |
| Lightweight | Mike Hamel | def. | Killys Mota | Decision (split) (28–29, 29–28, 30–27) | 3 | 5:00 |
| Catchweight (160 lb) | Spike Carlyle | def. | Dan Moret | Technical Submission (rear-naked choke) | 3 | 2:58 |
| Welterweight | Kyle Crutchmer | def. | Oliver Enkamp | Decision (unanimous) (30–27, 30–27, 30–27) | 3 | 5:00 |

== See also ==
- 2021 in Bellator MMA
- List of Bellator MMA events
- List of current Bellator fighters
