= Gabe Dean =

American wrestler (born 1994)

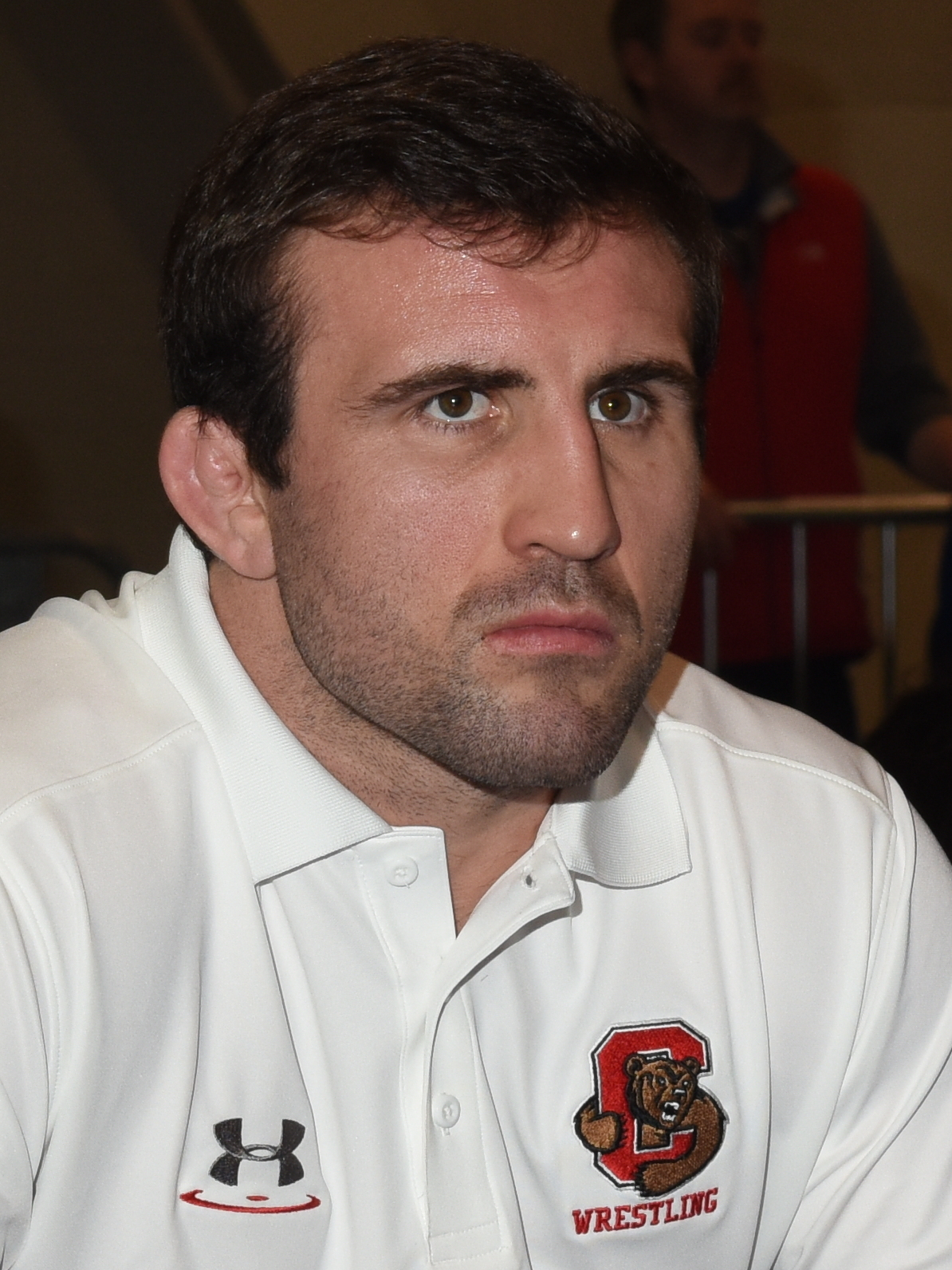
- Dean in 2019

Personal information
- Full name: Gabriel Curtis Dean
- Born: June 19, 1994 (age 32) Lowell, Michigan, U.S.
- Height: 5 ft 10 in (178 cm)
- Weight: 86 kg (190 lb)

Sport
- Country: United States
- Sport: Wrestling
- Events: Freestyle, Greco-Roman, and Folkstyle
- College team: Cornell
- Club: Spartan Combat RTC
- Coached by: Rob Koll
Medal record
Men's freestyle wrestling
Representing the United States
Pan American Championships
Bronze medal – third place	2017 Lauro de Freitas	86 kg
US National Championships
Gold medal – first place	2020 Coralville (SN)	86 kg
Junior World Championships
Bronze medal – third place	2014 Zagreb	84 kg
Greco-Roman wrestling
Representing United States
Pan American Championships
Silver medal – second place	2015 Santiago	85 kg
Men's collegiate wrestling
Representing the Cornell Big Red
NCAA Division I Championships
Gold medal – first place	2015 St. Louis	184 lb
Gold medal – first place	2016 New York	184 lb
Silver medal – second place	2017 St. Louis	184 lb
Bronze medal – third place	2014 Oklahoma City	184 lb
EIWA Championships
Gold medal – first place	2014 Philadelphia	184 lb
Gold medal – first place	2015 Bethlehem	184 lb
Gold medal – first place	2016 Princeton	184 lb
Gold medal – first place	2017 Lewisburg	184 lb

Gabriel Curtis Dean (born June 19, 1994) is an American retired freestyle and Greco-Roman wrestler and graduated folkstyle wrestler who formerly competed at 86 kilograms. In freestyle, he was the 2020 US National Champion, a '17 Pan American Championship medalist, and a '14 Junior World Championship medalist. He was also the '15 Pan American Championship runner–up in Greco-Roman. As a collegiate wrestler, Dean was a two–time NCAA Division I champion, a four–time EIWA Conference champion, and a four–time NCAA Division I All-American for the Cornell Big Red.

== Folkstyle career ==
=== High school ===
Dean was born in Lowell, Michigan, where he went on to attend Lowell High School. His father David was an NCAA Division I National runner-up out of the University of Minnesota, which led to Gabriel's early start in the sport of wrestling. During his high school years, Dean was a standout wrestler and football player, and as a quarterback, he led his team to a state title and runner–up finishes and was a two–time All-State player. In wrestling, he went on to make the finals of the MHSAA state tournament, winning the title in an undefeated run as a junior and ending his senior year as the runner–up.

=== College ===
Dean chose to attend the Cornell University and wrestle there. During his four years of collegiate wrestling, Dean went on to become one of the most decorated athletes in the history of the team, claiming two NCAA titles and four EIWA conference titles, as well as racking up four All-American honors and a runner–up finish as a senior, where he lost to eventual three–timer Bo Nickal from Penn State in a legendarily close match. In regards to honors, Dean was a two–time EIWA and Ivy League Wrestler of the Year, as well as the Rookie of the Year as a freshman.

== International career ==
=== 2013–2017 ===
Dean, who was graduating high school, made his senior freestyle debut in May 2013, when he went on to place third at the Northeastern Regionals and sixth at the US University Nationals. At the 2015 Pan American Championships, Dean made his Greco-Roman debut with no previous training in the discipline, and went on to place second. In April 2017, Dean decided to wrestle at the US Open in freestyle, and went on to place sixth. Afterwards, he placed third at the Pan American Championships, with technical falls over former Olympian from Colombia Carlos Izquierdo and South American Games runner–up from Peru Pool Ambrocio. Dean then announced he would try his hand as a Greco–Roman wrestler, but after competing and losing in his first match at the 2017 US U23 World Team Trials, he decided to retire.

=== 2020–2021 ===
In October 2020, Dean opted to come out of retirement to compete at the US Nationals, where he claimed the title after defeating former All-American Nate Jackson in the finals. Next, he competed at the Flo 8-Man Challenge: 195 lbs, where he lost in the first match to Taylor Lujan (whom he had tech'd weeks earlier) after dominating prior to a pin. Dean then confirmed he would take a run for the US Olympic Team Trials. In November, Dean wrestled World Champion David Taylor at the NLWC III and went to a fairly close decision loss.

To start off the 2021 year, he earned the biggest win of his career when he defeated U23 World Champion Bo Nickal at the NLWC III, while also earning revenge from the '17 NCAA's, before being tech'd by three–time World and Olympic champion at 97 kg Kyle Snyder. On March, he earned a spot at the US Olympic Team Trials when he won the US Last Chance Olympic Trials Qualifier as the top–seed, defeating Nate Jackson and NCAA champion Drew Foster in the process. At the US Olympic Team Trials, Dean defeated former NCAA champion Myles Martin before being downed himself by David Taylor in a rematch, failing to make the team. After his last run, Dean returned to retirement from competition.

== Freestyle record ==
Senior Freestyle Matches
Res.	Record	Opponent	Score	Date	Event	Location
2020 US Olympic Team Trials DNP at 86 kg
Loss	27–11	(United States) David Taylor	0–4	April 2, 2021	2020 US Olympic Team Trials	(United States) Fort Worth, Texas
Win	27–10	(United States) Myles Martin	2–1	April 2, 2021	2020 US Olympic Team Trials	(United States) Fort Worth, Texas
2020 US Last Chance OTT (gold) at 86 kg
Win	26–10	(United States) Nate Jackson	7–2	March 27, 2021	2020 US Last Chance Olympic Team Trials Qualifier	(United States) Fort Worth, Texas
Win	25–10	(United States) Drew Foster	8–0	March 27, 2021	2020 US Last Chance Olympic Team Trials Qualifier	(United States) Fort Worth, Texas
Win	24–10	(United States) C.J. Brucki	TF 12–2	March 27, 2021	2020 US Last Chance Olympic Team Trials Qualifier	(United States) Fort Worth, Texas
Win	23–10	(United States) Jonathan Loew	FF	March 27, 2021	2020 US Last Chance Olympic Team Trials Qualifier	(United States) Fort Worth, Texas
Win	22–10	(United States) Jake Hendricks	TF 10–0	March 27, 2021	2020 US Last Chance Olympic Team Trials Qualifier	(United States) Fort Worth, Texas
Loss	21–10	(United States) Kyle Snyder	TF 2–13	February 23, 2021	NLWC V	(United States) State College, Pennsylvania
Win	21–9	(United States) Bo Nickal	3–2	February 23, 2021	NLWC V	(United States) State College, Pennsylvania
Loss	20–9	(United States) David Taylor	2–6	November 24, 2020	NLWC III	(United States) State College, Pennsylvania
2020 US Nationals (gold) at 86 kg
Win	20–8	(United States) Nate Jackson	1–1	October 10–11, 2020	2020 US Senior Nationals	(United States) Coralville, Iowa
Win	19–8	(United States) Trent Hidlay	2–1	October 10–11, 2020	2020 US Senior Nationals	(United States) Coralville, Iowa
Win	18–8	(United States) Taylor Lujan	TF 10–0	October 10–11, 2020	2020 US Senior Nationals	(United States) Coralville, Iowa
Win	17–8	(United States) Nathan Haas	Fall	October 10–11, 2020	2020 US Senior Nationals	(United States) Coralville, Iowa
Win	16–8	(United States) Leonardo Tarantino	TF 12–1	October 10–11, 2020	2020 US Senior Nationals	(United States) Coralville, Iowa
Flo 8-Man Challenge DNP at 195 lbs
Loss	15–8	(United States) Taylor Lujan	Fall	October 31, 2020	FloWrestling 8-Man Challenge	(United States) Austin, Texas
2017 Pan American Championships (bronze) at 86 kg
Win	15–7	(Peru) Pool Ambrocio	TF 12–2	May 5–7, 2017	2017 Pan American Wrestling Championships	Lauro de Freitas, Brazil
Loss	14–7	(Cuba) Yurieski Torreblanca	4–6	May 5–7, 2017	2017 Pan American Wrestling Championships	Lauro de Freitas, Brazil
Win	14–6	(Colombia) Carlos Izquierdo	TF 11–0	May 5–7, 2017	2017 Pan American Wrestling Championships	Lauro de Freitas, Brazil
2017 US Open 6th at 86 kg
Win	13–6	(United States) TJ Dudley	8–8	April 26–29, 2017	2017 US Open National Championships	(United States) Las Vegas, Nevada
Loss	12–6	(United States) Pat Downey	6–7	April 26–29, 2017	2017 US Open National Championships	(United States) Las Vegas, Nevada
Win	12–5	(United States) Austin Trotman	13–10	April 26–29, 2017	2017 US Open National Championships	(United States) Las Vegas, Nevada
Loss	11–5	(United States) Nick Heflin	3–6	April 26–29, 2017	2017 US Open National Championships	(United States) Las Vegas, Nevada
Win	11–4	(United States) Kyle Crutchmer	TF 15–4	April 26–29, 2017	2017 US Open National Championships	(United States) Las Vegas, Nevada
Win	10–4	(United States) John Rizqallah	TF 10–0	April 26–29, 2017	2017 US Open National Championships	(United States) Las Vegas, Nevada
2013 US University Nationals 6th at 84 kg
Loss	9–4	(United States) Alex Meyer	5–6	May 23–26, 2013	2013 ASICS US University National Championships	(United States) Akron, Ohio
Loss	9–3	(United States) Max Thomusseit	1–3	May 23–26, 2013	2013 ASICS US University National Championships	(United States) Akron, Ohio
Win	9–2	(United States) Nathaniel Brown	INJ	May 23–26, 2013	2013 ASICS US University National Championships	(United States) Akron, Ohio
Win	8–2	(United States) Kyle Crutchmer	TF 11–1	May 23–26, 2013	2013 ASICS US University National Championships	(United States) Akron, Ohio
Win	7–2	(United States) James Mannier	TF 10–0	May 23–26, 2013	2013 ASICS US University National Championships	(United States) Akron, Ohio
Win	6–2	(United States) Kris Klapprodt	14–8	May 23–26, 2013	2013 ASICS US University National Championships	(United States) Akron, Ohio
Loss	5–2	(United States) Kenneth Courts	Fall	May 23–26, 2013	2013 ASICS US University National Championships	(United States) Akron, Ohio
Win	5–1	(United States) Derek Thomas	TF 12–2	May 23–26, 2013	2013 ASICS US University National Championships	(United States) Akron, Ohio
Win	4–1	(United States) Brian Engdahl	TF 11–0	May 23–26, 2013	2013 ASICS US University National Championships	(United States) Akron, Ohio
2013 NE Regionals (bronze) at 84 kg
Win	3-1	(United States) Scott Gibbons	3–0, 5–2	May 3–5, 2013	2013 NE Regional Championships	(United States) East Stroudsburg, Pennsylvania
Win	2–1	(United States) Tyler Wood	6–0, 5–0	May 3–5, 2013	2013 NE Regional Championships	(United States) East Stroudsburg, Pennsylvania
Loss	1–1	(United States) Enock Francois	0–2, 0–1	May 3–5, 2013	2013 NE Regional Championships	(United States) East Stroudsburg, Pennsylvania
Win	1–0	(United States) Andrew Detwiler	Fall	May 3–5, 2013	2013 NE Regional Championships	(United States) East Stroudsburg, Pennsylvania

== Greco-Roman record ==
Senior Greco-Roman Matches
Res.	Record	Opponent	Score	Date	Event	Location
2017 US U23 World Team Trials at 85 kg
Loss	2–2	(United States) Spencer Wilson	TF 2–10	October 7, 2017	2017 US U23 World Team Trials	(United States) Rochester, Minnesota
2015 Pan American Championships (silver) at 85 kg
Loss	2–1	(Cuba) Gilberto Piquet Herrera	0–4	April 24–26, 2015	2015 Pan American Championships	Santiago, Chile
Win	2–0	(Puerto Rico) Luis Betancourt	INJ	April 24–26, 2015	2015 Pan American Championships	Santiago, Chile
Win	1–0	(Venezuela) Querys Pérez	6–1	April 24–26, 2015	2015 Pan American Championships	Santiago, Chile

== NCAA record ==
NCAA Championships Matches
Res.	Record	Opponent	Score	Date	Event
2017 NCAA Championships (silver) at 184 lbs
Loss	19–2	Bo Nickal	3–4	March 16–18, 2017	2017 NCAA Division I Wrestling Championships
Win	19–1	Nolan Boyd	9–3	March 16–18, 2017	2017 NCAA Division I Wrestling Championships
Win	18–1	Jack Dechow	TB–1 4–3	March 16–18, 2017	2017 NCAA Division I Wrestling Championships
Win	17–1	Jordan Ellingwood	MD 11–3	March 16–18, 2017	2017 NCAA Division I Wrestling Championships
Win	16–1	Michael Coleman	MD 21–12	March 16–18, 2017	2017 NCAA Division I Wrestling Championships
2016 NCAA Championships (gold) at 184 lbs
Win	15–1	Timothy Dudley	5–3	March 17–19, 2016	2016 NCAA Division I Wrestling Championships
Win	14–1	Pete Renda	9–4	March 17–19, 2016	2016 NCAA Division I Wrestling Championships
Win	13–1	Nolan Boyd	10–4	March 17–19, 2016	2016 NCAA Division I Wrestling Championships
Win	12–1	Thomas Sleigh	Fall	March 17–19, 2016	2016 NCAA Division I Wrestling Championships
Win	11–1	Jack Dechow	3–1	March 17–19, 2016	2016 NCAA Division I Wrestling Championships
2015 NCAA Championships (gold) at 184 lbs
Win	10–1	Nathaniel Brown	6–2	March 19–21, 2015	2015 NCAA Division I Wrestling Championships
Win	9–1	Victor Avery	TB–2 4–3	March 19–21, 2015	2015 NCAA Division I Wrestling Championships
Win	8–1	Sammy Brooks	3–2	March 19–21, 2015	2015 NCAA Division I Wrestling Championships
Win	7–1	Timothy Dudley	9–8	March 19–21, 2015	2015 NCAA Division I Wrestling Championships
Win	6–1	Patrick Kissell	MD 10–1	March 19–21, 2015	2015 NCAA Division I Wrestling Championships
2014 NCAA Championships (bronze) at 184 lbs
Win	5–1	Jack Dechow	5–4	March 20–22, 2014	2014 NCAA Division I Wrestling Championships
Win	4–1	Lawrence Thomas	Fall	March 20–22, 2014	2014 NCAA Division I Wrestling Championships
Loss	3–1	Ed Ruth	3–5	March 20–22, 2014	2014 NCAA Division I Wrestling Championships
Win	3–0	Jacob Swartz	11–4	March 20–22, 2014	2014 NCAA Division I Wrestling Championships
Win	2–0	John Rizqallah	11–4	March 20–22, 2014	2014 NCAA Division I Wrestling Championships
Win	1–0	Lelund Weatherspoon	MD 12–4	March 20–22, 2014	2014 NCAA Division I Wrestling Championships
