= Oliver Enkamp =

Swedish mixed martial arts fighter

- Born: Miko Eric Oliver Enkamp; August 10, 1991 (age 35); Täby kyrkby, Sweden
- Other names: The Future
- Nationality: Swedish
- Height: 6 ft 0 in (1.83 m)
- Weight: 170 lb (77 kg; 12 st 2 lb)
- Division: Welterweight
- Reach: 77.0 in (196 cm)
- Style: Kickboxing, Muay Thai, Karate
- Fighting out of: Stockholm, Sweden
- Team: Pancrase Gym Sweden
- Rank: Black belt in Karate
- Years active: 2013–present

Kickboxing record
- Total: 1
- Wins: 1
- By knockout: 1

Mixed martial arts record
- Total: 15
- Wins: 11
- By knockout: 2
- By submission: 7
- By decision: 2
- Losses: 4
- By knockout: 1
- By decision: 3

Other information
- Mixed martial arts record from Sherdog

Miko Eric Oliver Enkamp (born August 10, 1991) is a Swedish mixed martial artist who competes in the Welterweight division. He has previously competed for the UFC and Bellator MMA.

== Background ==
=== Karate ===
Enkamp grew up with martial arts as his family runs Combat Academy - a martial arts center in Täby - where he himself started training already at a couple of years old. Having a permanent training partner in his brother would pay off and he was, among other things, selected to the Swedish junior national team in karate after traveling around Europe and competing in both kata (his brother Jesse's specialty) and kumite. During the years he was active in karate, he visited Okinawa in Japan several times to learn more directly from the birthplace of karate.

=== Kickboxing ===
As a teenager, his interests expanded and he started training kickboxing after watching matches in K-1 on Eurosport. At this time, in addition to karate training, the club also had two kickboxing coaches named Anders Carlsson and Roger Wikström who helped him develop and became something of a mentor to Enkamp.

=== Submission grappling ===
At the same time as the sport of MMA gained momentum, Enkamp became interested in grappling and began training at the club Pancrase Gym to add submissions to its technical register. Shortly afterwards, he started competing in this, which led him to a gold in the SGL - Swedish Grappling League. Oliver attributes his creativity and movement patterns on the ground to all the years he practiced breakdance as a teenager.

=== Muay Thai ===
As soon as Enkamp graduated from high school, he went to the Tiger Muay Thai facility in Phuket, Thailand to study Muay Thai. He stayed there for nine weeks to train and compete in his first professional Muay Thai match. This match was shared on the Tiger Muay Thai training camp's Youtube channel, where he won with a front kick knockout in the second round.

== Mixed martial arts career ==
=== Early career ===
==== Amateur ====
In 2009, Enkamp received an invitation to the summer camp MMA-Academy and he signed up as the only participant from the club. Once in place, a whole new world opened up for him when he realized how deep one could dive into the technical and tactical aspects of the sport. It was the starting shot for what would be his professional MMA career. In 2010 he started competing in shootfighting (today called MMA class-B) and the following year they introduced Amateur MMA (today called MMA class-A) which he competed successfully in and became the first Swedish champion in 2011 after a six-second KO in the final match. The following year, 2012, he defended his title as Swedish champion in welterweight (-77.1 kg) before he with an amateur result of 14-1 decided to start competing professionally.

==== Professional ====
Prior to his professional debut, Enkamp went to the Alliance Training Center in San Diego, CA, USA. There he lived upstairs in the gym for two months and trained with i.a. Ross Pearson, Jeremy Stephens, Brandon Vera, Phil Davis and Dominick Cruz. As prepared as he could be, he went since his debut match on March 9, 2013 at IRFA 4 against the Finn Kari Paivinen and won via reverse triangle throttling in the third round.

Before the next match in IRFA, Enkamp played a match at the Scanian organization Trophy MMA's second gala where he 1 June 2013 won his second professional match via rear-naked in the second round against the Swede Erik Greissen. After that, he spent a summer with his brother in Hawaii and visited BJ Penn's gym in Hilo.

Then back under IRFA's flag, he met Georg the Swede Guram Kutateladze on April 5, 2014 at IRFA 6 and won by unanimous decision.

When he then returned to the USA, he made it to the American Top Team to wrestle with e.g. Thiago Alves and sparred with Gleison Tibau. Six months later at IRFA 7 on 22 November 2014, Enkamp met the Pole Lukasz Bieniek, whom he defeated via submission late in the second round.

In the spring of 2015, Enkamp flew to Las Vegas to participate in the competitions for the TV series The Ultimate Fighter, where he joined the European team coached by Conor McGregor. The following summer, there was a training trip to Lyoto Machida's dojo in Belém, Brazil, where he made good contact with the former UFC champion and advice on what would lead him to a future contract with the UFC. However, a knee injury from training in Brazil put a stop to the TUF opportunity.

On September 17, 2016 at IRFA 10, it was time for the next match. This time against the Dutchman Arne Boekee in the gala's main match which Enkamp defeated via armbar / triangle in the second round.

==== Superior Challenge ====
Less than a month after his last match in IRFA, Enkamp went up against the Brazilian Rickson Pontes at SC 14. After a tough match, Enkamp won via unanimous decision and was noticed by Swedish newspapers.

About six months later, April 1, 2017 came the next match in SC 15 where he met the Dane Frodi Vitalis Hansen and won via TKO already in the first round.

=== Ultimate Fighting Championship ===
Enkamp, as a replacement for Emil Weber Meek, made his UFC debut on short notice on 28 May 2017 at UFC Fight Night: Gustafsson vs. Teixeira. He lost the fight by unanimous decision.

Enkamp faced Danny Roberts on 17 March 2018 at UFC Fight Night: Werdum vs. Volkov. He lost the fight via knockout in the first round.

After his second straight loss, he was released from the UFC.

=== Bellator MMA ===
Enkamp made his Bellator debut against Walter Gahadza on June 22, 2019 at Bellator 223. He won the bout via rear-naked choke at the end of the first round.

Enkamp's next match in Bellator was confirmed on August 8 and it was against the Italian Giorgio Pietrini on October 12, 2019 at Bellator 230 and was the second main match, co-main. On 17 September, MMAjunkie announced that Giorgio Pietrini had been removed from the card due to illness and that Bellator was looking for a new opponent for Enkamp, and on 26 September, Enkamp himself announced via instagram that the match had been canceled.

In his sophomore performance, Enkamp faced Lewis Long on February 22, 2022 at Bellator 240. He scored a highlight finish, knocking out spinning back fist in the first round.

Enkamp faced Emmanuel Dawa on October 10, 2020 at Bellator 248. He scored a Japanese necktie to win the bout in the first round.

Enkamp faced Kyle Crutchmer on December 3, 2021 at Bellator 272. He lost his first Bellator bout via unanimous decision.

Enkamp faced Mark Lemminger on May 13, 2022 at Bellator 281. He won this fight scoring a buggy choke, the first in Bellator history, in the third round.

Enkamp was scheduled to face Luca Poclit on February 25, 2023 at Bellator 291. However, Enkamp had to pull out of the bout due to injury.

Enkamp was rebooked to face Luca Poclit on May 12, 2023 at Bellator 296 He lost the fight by unanimous decision.

Enkamp was scheduled to face French fighter Baïssangour Chamsoudinov on November 16, 2024 at Bellator Champions Series 6. However, this event was later cancelled due to unspecified reasons.

== Personal life ==
Oliver's brother, Jesse, runs a successful Youtube channel with a million subscribers, where he discusses karate and other topics related to martial arts. Oliver makes frequent appearances on the channel with his brother covering his training camps and other aspects of his MMA career.

== Mixed martial arts record ==
Professional record breakdown
15 matches	11 wins	4 losses
By knockout	2	1
By submission	7	0
By decision	2	3

Res.	Record	Opponent	Method	Event	Date	Round	Time	Location	Notes
Loss	11–4	Luca Poclit	Decision (unanimous)	Bellator 296	May 12, 2023	3	5:00	Paris, France	
Win	11–3	Mark Lemminger	Submission (inverted triangle)	Bellator 281	May 13, 2022	3	0:25	London, England	
Loss	10–3	Kyle Crutchmer	Decision (unanimous)	Bellator 272	December 3, 2021	3	5:00	Uncasville, Connecticut, United States	
Win	10–2	Emmanuel Dawa	Submission (japanese necktie)	Bellator 248	October 10, 2020	1	4:10	Paris, France	
Win	9–2	Lewis Long	KO (spinning backfist)	Bellator 240	February 22, 2020	1	4:10	Dublin, Ireland	
Win	8–2	Walter Gahadza	Submission (rear-naked choke)	Bellator 223	June 22, 2019	1	4:54	London, England	
Loss	7–2	Danny Roberts	KO (punch)	UFC Fight Night: Werdum vs. Volkov	March 17, 2018	1	2:12	London, England	
Loss	7–1	Nordine Taleb	Decision (unanimous)	UFC Fight Night: Gustafsson vs. Teixeira	May 28, 2017	3	5:00	Stockholm, Sweden	
Win	7–0	Frodi Vitalis Hansen	TKO (punches)	Superior Challenge 15	April 1, 2017	1	4:50	Stockholm, Sweden	
Win	6–0	Rickson Pontes	Decision (unanimous)	Superior Challenge 14	October 8, 2016	3	5:00	Stockholm, Sweden	
Win	5–0	Arne Boekee	Submission (triangle choke)	International Ring Fight Arena 10	September 17, 2016	2	2:25	Stockholm, Sweden	
Win	4–0	Łukasz Bieniek	Submission (rear-naked choke)	International Ring Fight Arena 7	November 22, 2014	2	4:52	Solna, Sweden	Catchweight (161 lb) bout.
Win	3–0	Guram Kutateladze	Decision (unanimous)	International Ring Fight Arena 6	April 5, 2014	3	5:00	Solna, Sweden	Catchweight (161 lb) bout.
Win	2–0	Erik Greisson	Submission (rear-naked choke)	Trophy MMA 2	June 1, 2013	2	3:17	Malmö, Sweden	Welterweight debut.
Win	1–0	Kari Paivinen	Submission (inverted triangle choke)	International Ring Fight Arena 4	March 9, 2013	3	1:50	Solna, Sweden	Catchweight (161 lb) bout.

== See also ==
- List of male mixed martial artists
