= Final X: Lincoln (2019) =

Amateur wrestling event in 2019

- Promotion: USA Wrestling
- Date: June 14-15, 2019
- Venue: Bob Devaney Sports Center
- City: Lincoln, Nebraska

Event chronology
Final X: Rutgers	Final X: Lincoln (2019)	Final X Special Wrestle-off: Dake vs. Dieringer

Final X: Lincoln (2019) was an amateur wrestling event produced by USA Wrestling and FloSports held on June 14-15, 2019 at the Bob Devaney Sports Center in Lincoln, Nebraska.

== History ==
This event was the second that took place at the Bob Devaney Sports Center after one of last year's, also called Final X: Lincoln.

The headline was a rematch series between Jordan Burroughs and Isaiah Martinez. The pair had already wrestled at '18 Final X, resulting on Burroughs defeating Martinez twice, including a technical fall in the second match. After making the '18 World Team, Burroughs went on to place third at the World Championships and was now looking to make his ninth straight US World/Olympic Team.

The headline of the first session was a Greco-Roman match between eventual Pan American Champion G'Angelo Hancock and Lucas Sheridan. This was Hancock's attempt to make his fifth US World Team (including age-group).

== Results ==
Final X: Lincoln
Weight Class					Method	Round	Time	Notes
Session II
74kg	FS	(United States) Jordan Burroughs	def.	(United States) Isaiah Martinez	7–1, 5–6, 5–4	6	3:00	
57kg	FS	(United States) Daton Fix	def.	(United States) Thomas Gilman	6–3, 2–3, 6–1	6	3:00	
70kg	FS	(United States) James Green	def.	(United States) Ryan Deakin	4–3, TF 11–0	3	0:18	
97kg	FS	(United States) Kyle Snyder	def.	(United States) Kyven Gadson	TF 10–0, 4–0	3	3:00	
61kg	FS	(United States) Tyler Graff	def.	(United States) Joe Colon	TF 12–2, 9–2	3	3:00	
130kg	GR	(United States) Adam Coon	def.	(United States) Cohlton Schultz	5–1, Fall	3	1:42	
76kg	WFS	(United States) Adeline Gray	def.	(United States) Precious Bell	TF 10–0, Fall	2	1:57	
53kg	WFS	(United States) Sarah Hildebrandt	def.	(United States) Katherine Shai	8–0, 3–0	4	3:00	
62kg	FS	(United States) Kayla Miracle	def.	(United States) Mallory Velte	4–0, TF 12–2	4	1:42	
Session I
97kg	GR	(United States) G'Angelo Hancock	def.	(United States) Lucas Sheridan	5–2, Fall	4	0:23	
63kg	GR	(United States) Ryan Mango	def.	(United States) Xavier Johnson	6–5, TF 13–2	3	1:06	
72kg	GR	(United States) Raymond Bunker	def.	(United States) Alex Mossing	7–0, 3–1	2	3:00	
55kg	WFS	(United States) Jacarra Winchester	def.	(United States) Dominique Parrish	8–3, TF 10-0	3	2:59	
60kg	GR	(United States) Ildar Hafizov	def.	(United States) Leslie Fuenffinger	TF 9–0, 7–5	3	3:00	
59kg	WFS	(United States) Alli Ragan	def.	(United States) Lauren Louive	TF 10–0, TF 10–0	2	1:47	

== See also ==
- Final X
