= 2016 Grand Prix Zagreb Open =

- Host city: Zagreb, Croatia
- Dates: 23–24 January 2016
- Stadium: Dom Sportova

The 2016 Grand Prix Zagreb Open was a Greco-Roman wrestling event held in Zagreb, Croatia, between 23 and 24 January 2016.

== Medal table ==
Rank	Nation	Gold	Silver	Bronze	Total
1	Hungary	3	2	3	8
2	Croatia	2	0	1	3
3	Serbia	1	3	4	8
4	Poland	1	1	3	5
5	Czech Republic	1	0	1	2
6	United States	0	1	3	4
7	Slovakia	0	1	0	1
8	Austria	0	0	1	1
Totals (8 entries)		8	8	16	32

== Team ranking ==
Rank	Men's Greco-Roman	
Rank	Team	Points
1	Hungary	91
2	Poland	84
3	Serbia	77
4	Croatia	70
5	United States	44
6	Czech Republic	36
7	Austria	14
8	Austria	9
9	Bulgaria	6
10	Germany	6

== Greco-Roman ==
Event	Gold	Silver	Bronze
59 kg	Peter Modos; Hungary	Tamas Nad; Serbia	Dawid Ersetic; Poland
59 kg	Peter Modos; Hungary	Tamas Nad; Serbia	Kristijan Fris; Serbia
66 kg	Danijel Janečić; Croatia	Ottó Losonczi; Hungary	Mate Nemeš; Serbia
66 kg	Danijel Janečić; Croatia	Ottó Losonczi; Hungary	Jesse Thielke; United States
71 kg	Tamás Lőrincz; Hungary	Istvan Leva; Slovakia	Jan Zizka; Czech Republic
71 kg	Tamás Lőrincz; Hungary	Istvan Leva; Slovakia	Aleksandar Maksimović; Serbia
75 kg	Božo Starčević; Croatia	Arkadiusz Kułynycz; Poland	Edgar Babayan; Poland
75 kg	Božo Starčević; Croatia	Arkadiusz Kułynycz; Poland	Neven Žugaj; Croatia
80 kg	Viktor Nemeš; Serbia	Laszlo Szabo; Hungary	Michael Wagner; Austria
80 kg	Viktor Nemeš; Serbia	Laszlo Szabo; Hungary	Zoltan Keri; Hungary
85 kg	Damian Janikowski; Poland	Petar Balo; Serbia	Patrick Martinez; United States
85 kg	Damian Janikowski; Poland	Petar Balo; Serbia	Tadeusz Michalik; Poland
98 kg	Artur Omarov; Czech Republic	Joe Rau; United States	Daniel Miler; United States
98 kg	Artur Omarov; Czech Republic	Joe Rau; United States	Zsolt Torok; Hungary
130 kg	Bálint Lám; Hungary	Boban Živanović; Serbia	Arnold Pap; Hungary
130 kg	Bálint Lám; Hungary	Boban Živanović; Serbia	Nemanja Pavlović; Serbia

== Participating nations ==
87 competitors from 12 nations participated.

- Argentina (2)
- Austria (5)
- Bulgaria (1)
- Croatia (17)
- Czech Republic (6)
- Germany (1)
- Hungary (13)
- Poland (17)
- Serbia (12)
- Slovakia (2)
- Slovenia (2)
- United States (9)
