= Final X: Rutgers =

Amateur wrestling event in 2019

- Promotion: USA Wrestling
- Date: June 7-8, 2019
- Venue: Rutgers Athletic Center
- City: Piscataway, New Jersey

Event chronology
Final X Lehigh	Final X: Rutgers	Final X: Lincoln (2019)

Final X: Rutgers was an amateur wrestling event produced by USA Wrestling and FloSports held on June 7-8, 2019 at the Rutgers Athletic Center in Piscataway, New Jersey.

== History ==
This event was originally headlined by the returning World Champion David Taylor and US Open champion Pat Downey. However, on late May, it was announced that Taylor had to withdraw from the series due to an injury suffered at Beat The Streets. This resulted on Downey earning the spot for the World Championships.

After the original headline had fallen apart, it was replaced by the co-main event, a series between another returning World Champion in J'den Cox and another US Open champion Bo Nickal.

The second (and ultimately last) match between Yianni Diakomihalis and Zain Retherford was very controversial due to its ruling and final result, as it was first thought that Diakomihalis had won the match 8 points to 6, leading to a third match. However, the match was ultimately ruled a 6-6 criteria decision win for Retherford. Due to the controversy, a wrestle-off took place in a special event.

== Results ==
Second Session
Weight class				Method	Round	Time	Notes
MFS 92 kg	J'den Cox	def.	Bo Nickal	4-2; 5-0	2; 2	6:00; 6:00
MFS 65 kg	Zain Retherford	def.	Yianni Diakomihalis	10-4; 6-6	2; 2	6:00; 6:00
MFS 125 kg	Nick Gwiazdowski	def.	Gable Steveson	4-4; 3-3	2; 2	6:00; 6:00
WFS 50 kg	Whitney Conder	def.	Victoria Anthony	7-4; Fall	2; 1	6:00; 1:57
WFS 68 kg	Tamyra Mensah-Stock	def.	Alexandria Glaude	Fall; TF 10-0	2	4:50
GR 77 kg	Pat Smith	def.	Kamal Bey	TF 2-11; 2-1; 6-3	2; 2; 2	3:51; 6:00; 6:00
WFS 65 kg	Forrest Molinari	def.	Maya Nelson	3-5; TF 12-2; 4-1	2; 2; 2	6:00; 4:49; 6:00
First Session
WFS 57 kg	Jenna Burkert	def.	Becka Leathers	4-2; 5-0	2; 2	6:00; 6:00
GR 67 kg	Ellis Coleman	def.	Jamel Johnson	Fall; 6-0	2; 2	4:05; 6:00
GR 55 kg	Max Nowry	def.	Brady Koontz	3-0; 11-5	2; 2	6:00; 6:00
GR 82 kg	John Stefanowicz	def.	Kendrick Sanders	8-5; 3-2	2; 2	6:00; 6:00
WFS 72 kg	Victoria Francis	def.	Alyvia Fiske	7-2; Fall	2; 2	6:00; 3:30
GR 87 kg	Joe Rau	def.	Ben Provisor	2-1; 5-1	2; 2	6:00; 6:00

== See also ==
- Final X
