= 2016 NCAA Division I Wrestling Championships =

2016 NCAA Division I Wrestling Tournament
- Teams: 72
- Format: Double-elimination
- Finals site: New York, New York; Madison Square Garden
- Champions: Penn State Nittany Lions (6th title)
- Runner-up: Oklahoma State Cowboys (45th title game)
- Semifinalists: Ohio State Buckeyes; Virginia Tech Hokies Iowa Hawkeye
- Winning coach: Cael Sanderson (5th title)
- MVP: Kyle Snyder ((Ohio State))
- Attendance: 110,194
- Television: ESPN Networks

The 2016 NCAA Division I Wrestling Championships took place from March 17 to March 19 in New York, New York at the Madison Square Garden. The tournament was the 86th NCAA Division I Wrestling Championships, and featured seventy two teams across that level.

Penn State won their sixth title after their streak of four titles was broken by Ohio State in 2015. PSU's head coach Cael Sanderson was named NCAA Coach of the Year.

== Team results ==
- Note: Top 10 only
- (H): Team from hosting U.S. state

Rank	Team	Points
1	Penn State	123
2	Oklahoma State	97 1/2
3	Ohio State	86
4	Virginia Tech	82
5	Iowa	81
6	Missouri	74 1/2
7	Cornell (H)	67
8	Nebraska	58
9	Illinois	50 1/2
9	Michigan	50 1/2

== Individual results ==
- Note: Table does not include wrestlebacks
- (H): Individual from hosting U.S. State

Weight	First	Second	Third
125 lbs	Nico Megaludis; Penn State	Thomas Gilman; Iowa	Nathan Tomasello; Ohio State
133 lbs	Nahshon Garrett; Cornell (H)	Cory Clark; Iowa	Cody Brewer; Oklahoma Sooners
141 lbs	Dean Heil; Oklahoma State	Bryce Meredith; Wyoming	Joey McKenna; Stanford
149 lbs	Zain Retherford; Penn State	Brandon Sorensen; Iowa	Lavion Mayes; Missouri
157 lbs	Isaiah Martinez; Illinois Fighting Illini	Jason Nolf; Penn State	Nick Brascetta; Virginia Tech Hokies
165 lbs	Alex Dieringer; Oklahoma State	Isaac Jordan; Wisconsin	Bo Jordan; Ohio State
174 lbs	Myles Martin; Ohio State	Bo Nickal; Penn State	Zach Epperly; Virginia Tech Hokies
184 lbs	Gabe Dean; Cornell (H)	Timothy Dudley; Nebraska	Pete Renda; NC State
197 lbs	J'den Cox; Missouri	Morgan McIntosh; Penn State	Brett Pfarr; Minnesota
285 lbs	Kyle Snyder; Ohio State	Nick Gwiazdowski; NC State	Adam Coon; Michigan
