= Final X =

Annual American wrestling event

- Genre: Sports
- Created by: USA Wrestling
- Country of origin: United States

Original release
- Network: FloSports
- Release: June 8, 2018

Final X is an annual series of wrestling events that determine the US Senior World/Olympic Team Members at each weight class.

== History ==
Final X was founded on January 16, 2018, after FloSports and USA Wrestling partnered and launched the series. The first event took place at Lincoln, Nebraska on June 8, 2018, and since then the events have been aired on FloWrestling.

In the events of 2018, there were only two disciplines; freestyle and women's freestyle. In 2019, Greco-Roman was also featured, presenting all of the three Olympic disciplines.

== Overview ==
Final X events are separated into two different formats:

- Regular events: Events that provide full cards and go as planned.
- Wrestle-offs events: Events that provide only one match that had inconveniences in the past.

== Function ==
Before 2018, the US World Team (one American wrestler per weight class competes at the World Championships) was defined in an event simply called "US World Team Trials". Since 2018, Final X has consisted on a best-of-three series that determines the representative of the United States at the World Championships.

== Events ==
| # | Event | Date | Venue | Location | Attendance | Ref. |
|---|---|---|---|---|---|---|
| 12 | Final X (2026) | June 19, 2026 | Prudential Center | Newark, New Jersey, U.S. | | |
| 11 | Final X (2025) | June 14, 2025 | Prudential Center | Newark, New Jersey, U.S. | Unknown | |
| 10 | Final X: Newark | June 10, 2023 | Prudential Center | Newark, New Jersey, U.S. | Unknown | |
| 9 | Final X: New York | June 8, 2022 | Madison Square Garden | New York, New York, U.S. | Unknown | |
| 8 | Final X: Stillwater | June 3, 2022 | Gallagher-Iba Arena | Stillwater, Oklahoma, U.S. | Unknown | |
| 7 | Final X Special Wrestle-off: Yianni vs. Zain | Sep 2, 2019 | Marts Center | Wilkes-Barre, Pennsylvania, U.S. | Unknown | |
| 6 | Final X Special Wrestle-off: Dake vs. Dieringer | Aug 17, 2019 | Round Rock High School | Round Rocks, Texas, U.S. | 1,334 | |
| 5 | Final X: Lincoln | Jun 14–15, 2019 | Bob Devaney Sports Center | Lincoln, Nebraska, U.S. | Unknown | |
| 4 | Final X: Rutgers | Jun 7–8, 2019 | Rutgers Athletic Center | Piscataway, New Jersey, U.S. | 5,345 | |
| 3 | Final X: Lehigh | Jun 22–23, 2018 | Grace Hall | Bethlehem, Pennsylvania, U.S. | Unknown | |
| 2 | Final X: State College | Jun 15–16, 2018 | Rec Hall | State College, Pennsylvania, U.S. | Unknown | |
| 1 | Final X: Lincoln | Jun 8–9, 2018 | Bob Devaney Sports Center | Lincoln, Nebraska, U.S. | 4,622 | |
