= 2017 NCAA Division I Wrestling Championships =

American collegiate wrestling tournament

Tournament information
- Sport: College wrestling
- Location: St. Louis, Missouri
- Venue(s): Scottrade Center

Final positions
- Champions: Penn State (7)
- 1st runners-up: Ohio State
- 2nd runners-up: Oklahoma State

Tournament statistics
- Attendance: 111,454
- MVP: Zain Retherford (Penn State)

In 2017, the NCAA Division I Wrestling Championships, a U.S. college wrestling tournament, was held in St. Louis, Missouri. The winning team was Penn State, and Kyle Snyder won the individual heavyweight competition.

== Team results ==
| Rank | School | Points | 1st | 2nd | 3rd | 4th | 5th | 6th | 7th | 8th | Total |
|---|---|---|---|---|---|---|---|---|---|---|---|
| 1 | Penn State | 146.5 | 5 | 0 | 0 | 0 | 1 | 0 | 0 | 0 | 6 |
| 2 | Ohio State | 110.00 | 1 | 1 | 2 | 1 | 1 | 0 | 0 | 0 | 6 |
| 3 | Oklahoma State | 103.0 | 1 | 0 | 0 | 2 | 2 | 2 | 1 | 0 | 8 |
| 4 | Iowa | 97.0 | 1 | 0 | 3 | 1 | 0 | 0 | 0 | 0 | 5 |
| 5 | Missouri | 86.5 | 1 | 2 | 0 | 0 | 1 | 1 | 0 | 0 | 5 |
| 6 | Virginia Tech | 63.5 | 0 | 0 | 0 | 2 | 1 | 1 | 0 | 1 | 5 |
| 7 | Minnesota | 62.5 | 0 | 2 | 0 | 0 | 0 | 0 | 1 | 1 | 4 |
| 8 | Cornell | 60.5 | 0 | 1 | 0 | 0 | 1 | 1 | 0 | 1 | 4 |
| 9 | Nebraska | 59.5 | 0 | 0 | 1 | 0 | 2 | 1 | 0 | 0 | 4 |
| 10 | Michigan | 47.5 | 0 | 0 | 1 | 2 | 0 | 0 | 0 | 0 | 3 |
| 11 | Illinois | 43.5 | 0 | 1 | 0 | 0 | 0 | 1 | 1 | 0 | 3 |
| 12 | Lehigh | 40.0 | 1 | 0 | 0 | 0 | 0 | 0 | 0 | 1 | 2 |
| 13 | Wisconsin | 39.5 | 0 | 1 | 0 | 1 | 0 | 0 | 0 | 0 | 2 |
| 14 | Arizona State | 39.0 | 0 | 0 | 2 | 0 | 0 | 0 | 0 | 0 | 2 |
| 15 | Virginia | 29.5 | 0 | 1 | 0 | 0 | 0 | 1 | 0 | 0 | 2 |
| 16 | South Dakota State | 28.5 | 0 | 1 | 0 | 0 | 0 | 0 | 0 | 1 | 2 |
| 17 | NC State | 26 | 0 | 0 | 1 | 0 | 0 | 0 | 0 | 0 | 1 |
| 18 | Northern Iowa | 25.5 | 0 | 0 | 0 | 0 | 1 | 0 | 1 | 0 | 2 |
| 19 | Rutgers | 24.5 | 0 | 0 | 0 | 0 | 0 | 1 | 1 | 0 | 2 |
| 20 | Edinboro | 20.5 | 0 | 0 | 0 | 0 | 0 | 0 | 1 | 0 | 1 |
| 21 | Rider | 20.0 | 0 | 0 | 0 | 0 | 0 | 0 | 2 | 0 | 2 |
| 21 | Wyoming | 20.0 | 0 | 0 | 0 | 1 | 0 | 0 | 0 | 0 | 1 |
| 23 | Central Michigan | 19.5 | 0 | 0 | 0 | 0 | 0 | 0 | 0 | 0 | 0 |
| 24 | Stanford | 16.0 | 0 | 0 | 0 | 0 | 0 | 0 | 1 | 0 | 1 |
| 25 | Princeton | 15.5 | 0 | 0 | 0 | 0 | 0 | 0 | 1 | 0 | 1 |

== Championship finals ==
| Weight class | 1st | 2nd | 3rd |
|---|---|---|---|
| 125 lbs | Darian Cruz (LEH) | Ethan Lizak (MINN) | Thomas Gilman (IOWA) |
| 133 lbs | Cory Clark (IOWA) | Seth Gross (SDSU) | Nathan Tomasello (OHST) |
| 141 lbs | Dean Heil (OKST) | George DiCamillo (UVA) | Kevin Jack (NCST) |
| 149 lbs | Zain Retherford (PSU) | Lavion Mayes (MIZZ) | Brandon Sorensen (IOWA) |
| 157 lbs | Jason Nolf (PSU) | Joey Lavalee (MIZZ) | Michael Kemmerer (IOWA) |
| 165 lbs | Vincenzo Joseph (PSU) | Isaiah Martinez (ILL) | Logan Massa (MICH) |
| 174 lbs | Mark Hall (PSU) | Bo Jordan (OHST) | Zahid Valencia (ASU) |
| 184 lbs | Bo Nickal (PSU) | Gabe Dean (COR) | TJ Dudley (NEB) |
| 197 lbs | J'den Cox (MIZZ) | Brett Pfarr (MINN) | Kollin Moore (OHST) |
| 285 lbs | Kyle Snyder (OHST) | Connor Medbery (WISC) | Tanner Hall (ASU) |
