= Joe Rau =

American wrestler (born 1991)

Joe Rau OLY
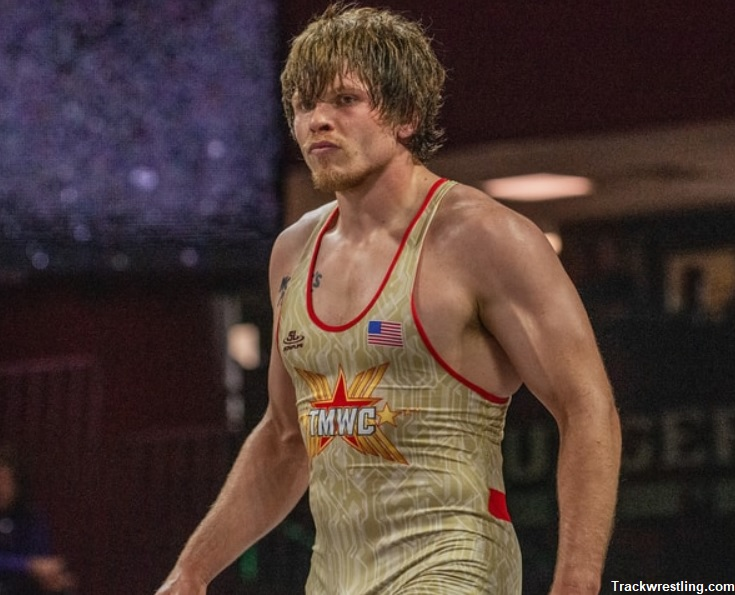
- Rau in 2020

Personal information
- Full name: Josef Patrick Rau
- Born: March 17, 1991 (age 35) Chicago, Illinois, U.S.
- Height: 6 ft 1 in (185 cm)

Sport
- Country: United States
- Sport: Wrestling
- Weight class: 97 kg
- Events: Greco-Roman and Folkstyle
- College team: Elmhurst University
- Club: Titan Mercury Wrestling Club; Minnesota Storm
- Team: USA
Medal record
Men's Greco-Roman wrestling
Representing the United States
Pan American Championships
Gold medal – first place	2015 Santiago de Chile	80 kg
Gold medal – first place	2020 Ottawa	87 kg
Gold medal – first place	2023 Buenos Aires	97 kg
Grand Prix
Silver medal – second place	2016 Zagreb	98 kg
Bronze medal – third place	2015 Madrid	98 kg
Dan Kolov & Nikola Petrov Tournament
Bronze medal – third place	2024 Sofia	97 kg
Dave Schultz Memorial International
Silver medal – second place	2015 Colorado Springs	80 kg
Bronze medal – third place	2019 Colorado Springs	87 kg
Men's collegiate wrestling
Representing Elmhurst University
NCAA Division III Championships
Gold medal – first place	2013 Cedar Rapids	184 lb
Bronze medal – third place	2012 La Crosse	184 lb

Josef Patrick "Joe" Rau (/raʊ/; born March 17, 1991) is an American Greco-Roman wrestler.

== High school career ==
Rau wrestled for St. Patrick High School in Chicago, Illinois, but never placed at the state tournament. He was an Illinois state qualifier, two-time conference champion and freestyle state champion.

== College career ==
At Elmhurst College, Rau was coached by past NCAA champion Steve Marianetti and won the 184 pound title at the 2013 NCAA Division III Wrestling Championships. He is a three-time NCAA DIII All-American and 2014 University Nationals Champion. Rau was named Conference Wrestler of the Year, Elmhurst College Athlete of the Year and became two-time place winner at Midlands Championships.

== Senior career ==
Joe Rau is a two-time Senior World Team Member (2014, 2019), and two-time U.S. Open champion (2016, 2019).

He competed in the 97 kg event at the 2024 Summer Olympics in Paris, France.

In 2021, he placed fifth in several international tournaments in Europe: Grand Prix of Zagreb Open in Croatia, the Olympic Preparation Tournament in Hungary and the ranking tournament Matteo Pellicone in Italy.

In 2020, Rau won gold at the Pan-American Championships and the Pan-American Olympic Qualifier. In doing so, effectively secured the Olympic spot for Team USA at 87 kg for the 2020 Olympics in Tokyo, Japan.

In 2019, he became Final X champion after scoring on Ben Provisor in the last seconds of the last finals match. Rau won the U.S. Open and came third at the Dave Schultz Memorial International. He placed fourth at the same tournament in Freestyle.

In 2018, Rau earned gold at the Lavrikov Championships in Russia and the Bill Farrell Memorial International in Freestyle. In Greco-Roman he took third at the Bill Farrell Memorial International. He placed second in the Haparanda Cup in Sweden and the U.S. Open. He came in fourth at the World Team Trials Challenge Tournament in Freestyle.

In 2017, after failing to qualify for the World Team in Greco-Roman, he earned a spot in the freestyle trials by way of a last chance qualifier. Rau became runner-up in the U.S. World Team Trials and U.S. Open.

In 2016, he won Olympic Team Trials, U.S. Open. He took silver at the Grand Prix of Zagreb Open and bronze at Pan-American Games Qualifier. He took ninth at the Second World Olympic Games Qualifier.

In 2015, Rau won the Pan-American Championships as well as a host of other domestic and international tournaments: Senior Nationals & Trials Qualifier, Bill Farrell International Tournament and the Grand Prix Zagreb Open. Additionally he took second at the Dave Schultz Memorial International, third at the Grand Prix of Spain and the Hungarian Grand Prix. He came in fourth in the U.S. Open.

In 2014, Rau became Phase II World Team Trials champion. He competed at the 2014 World Wrestling Championships at 80 kg. He lost in the first round to Jonas Bossert of Switzerland by fall. He won gold at the University Nationals Championships and Northern Plains Regional Championships.

In 2013, he became the runner-up at the New York AC International Tournament and took fourth place in the U.S. Open.

In 2012, Rau came in third at the Canada Cup in Freestyle.

As of October 2025, he was the head coach of Beat the Streets Wrestling in New York.
