= Nathan Tomasello =

American wrestler (born 1994)

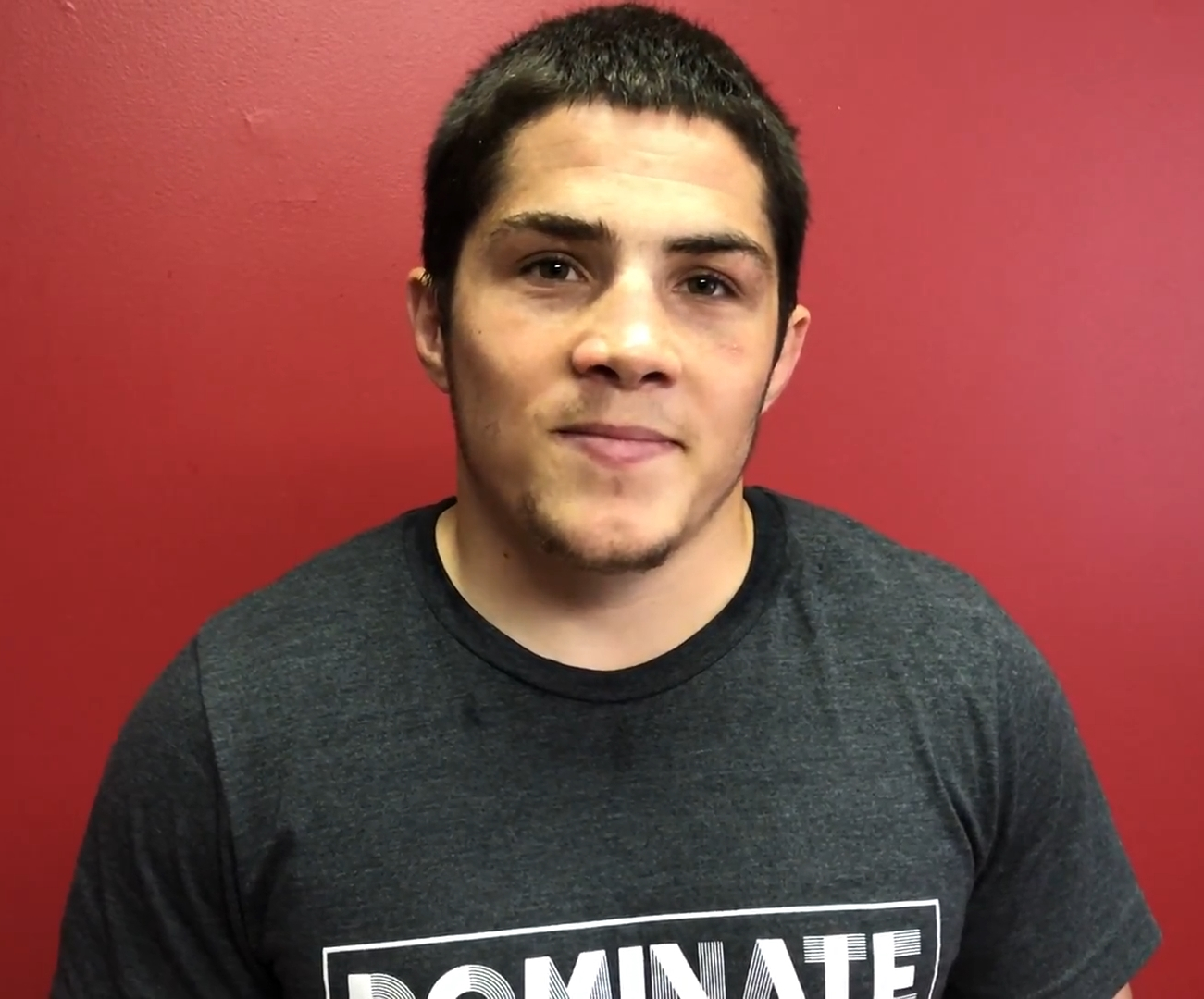
- Nathan Tomasello in June 2018

Personal information
- Full name: Nathan Khalid Tomasello
- National team: American
- Born: May 1, 1994 (age 32) Parma, Ohio, U.S.
- Height: 1.52 m (5 ft 0 in)
- Weight: 125 lb (57 kg)
- Website: natowrestling.com

Sport
- Country: United States
- Sport: Wrestling
- Events: Freestyle and Folkstyle
- College team: Ohio State
- Club: Titan Mercury WC; Oklahoma RTC
- Coached by: Sam Hazewinkel
Medal record
Men's freestyle wrestling
Representing the United States
US National Championships
Silver medal – second place	2019 Fort Worth (SN)	57 kg
Bronze medal – third place	2017 Las Vegas	57 kg
Men's collegiate wrestling
Representing the Ohio State Buckeyes
NCAA Division I Championships
Gold medal – first place	2015 St. Louis	125 lb
Bronze medal – third place	2016 New York	125 lb
Bronze medal – third place	2017 St. Louis	133 lb
Bronze medal – third place	2018 Cleveland	125 lb
Big Ten Championships
Gold medal – first place	2015 Columbus	125 lb
Gold medal – first place	2016 Iowa City	125 lb
Gold medal – first place	2017 Bloomington	133 lb
Gold medal – first place	2018 East Lansing	125 lb

Nathan Khalid Tomasello (born May 1, 1994) is an American freestyle and graduated folkstyle wrestler who competes at 57 kilograms. He currently competes in the Bantamweight division of Real American Freestyle (RAF), where he is a former RAF Bantamweight Champion.

In freestyle, Tomasello has medaled at multiple national and international competitions, most notably the Alexander Medved Prizes, Bill Farrell Memorial, and US Nationals. In college, he was an NCAA champion in 2015, a four–time Big Ten Conference champion, and a four–time All–American for the Ohio State Buckeyes.

== Folkstyle career ==
=== High school ===
As a high schooler, Tomasello was a four–time Ohio (OHSAA) state champion in Division II out of the Cuyahoga Valley Christian Academy. He graduated with an undefeated record of 51 wins and no losses as a senior and 178 wins with 5 losses overall. Tomasello was then recruited by the Ohio State University.

=== College ===
During his first collegiate season (2013–14), Tomasello was redshirted and compiled an undefeated 19–0 record competing in open tournaments. As a freshman, Tomasello claimed the NCAA and Big Ten Conference titles after a highly successful regular season, ending his season with a 33–4 record. As a sophomore and a junior, Tomasello remained undefeated throughout both regular seasons, claimed the B1G titles, but both times lost in the semifinals of the national tournaments and came back for third, becoming a three–time All–American. In his final year, his only loss during regular season was to freshman phenom from Iowa Spencer Lee, a multiple–time age–group freestyle World Champion, and would go on to compile a 7–1 record during this time frame. After becoming a four–time B1G champion, at his last NCAAs, Tomasello was once again knocked off on the semifinals, coming back to place third, giving an end to an outstanding career.

== Freestyle career ==
=== 2014–2017 ===
During his first years competing in the senior freestyle level (2014–2016), Tomasello racked up experience from the US Nationals and the US Olympic Team Trials.

Throughout 2017, Tomasello claimed the Ion Corneanu Memorial International, placed third at the US Open and the US World Team Trials and second at the US U23 World Team Trials, and Alexandr Medved Prizes.

=== 2019–2021 ===
After not competing in 2018, Thomasello placed sixth at the 2019 US Open and second at the Bill Farrell Memorial as well as the US Senior Nationals, qualifying for the 2020 US Olympic Team Trials with the latter result. In 2020, Thomasello only got to compete once due to the COVID-19 pandemic, placing second at the Cerro Pelado International.

After more than a year of inactiveness, Tomasello competed at the rescheduled US Olympic Team Trials in April 1–3, 2021 as the seventh seed, in an attempt to represent the United States at the 2020 Summer Olympics. After losing first round to US National Champion Vito Arujau, he bounced back with two straight victories to place third.

Tomasello then registered to compete at the prestigious 2021 Poland Open in early June, and moved from 57 to 61 kg on a days notice. Tomasello ultimately went 0–3, suffering dominant losses.

Tomasello came back in big fashion 2021 US World Team Trials from September 11 to 12, intending to represent the country at the World Championships at 61 kilograms. He scored brilliant upsets over 2019 NCAA champion Nick Suriano and returning World medalist Joe Colon to make his way to the best-of-three finale, where he faced Pan American Games gold medalist Daton Fix. He was dropped in two straight matches, placing second at the tournament.

== Freestyle record ==
Senior Freestyle Matches
Res.	Record	Opponent	Score	Date	Event	Location
2026 Henri Deglane Grand Prix DNP at 61 kg
Win	65-33	(Germany) Florian Richter	TF 10-0	January 10, 2026	2026 Henri Deglane Grand Prix	Nice, France
Loss	64-33	(Moldova) Leomid Colesnic	2-7	January 10, 2026	2026 Henri Deglane Grand Prix	Nice, France
Loss	64-32	(United States) Austin DeSanto	TF 0-10	January 10, 2026	2026 Henri Deglane Grand Prix	Nice, France
RAF 05 135 lb (Lost RAF Bantamweight Championship)
Loss	64-31	(United States) Austin DeSanto	TF 1-11	January 10, 2026	RAF 05	(United States) Sunrise, Florida
RAF 02 135 lb (Retained RAF Bantamweight Championship)
Win	64-30	(United States) Matt Ramos	5-3	October 25, 2025	RAF 02	(United States) State College, Pennsylvania
RAF 01 135 lb (Won Inaugural RAF Bantamweight Championship)
Win	63-30	(United States) Matt Ramos	4-3	August 30, 2025	RAF 01	(United States) Cleveland, Ohio
2025 US Open 8th at 61 kg
Loss		(United States) Fernando Barreto	DQ	April 23, 2025	2025 CLAW US Open	(United States) Las Vegas, Nevada
Loss		(United States) Austin DeSanto	DQ	April 23, 2025	2025 CLAW US Open	(United States) Las Vegas, Nevada
Win	62-30	(United States) Nico Megaludis	6–3	April 23, 2025	2025 CLAW US Open	(United States) Las Vegas, Nevada
Loss	61-30	(United States) Marcus Blaze	1-2	April 23, 2025	2025 CLAW US Open	(United States) Las Vegas, Nevada
Win	61-29	(United States) Nic Bouzakis	Fall	April 23, 2025	2025 CLAW US Open	(United States) Las Vegas, Nevada
Win	60-29	(United States) Michael Tortorice	TF 13–2	April 23, 2025	2025 CLAW US Open	(United States) Las Vegas, Nevada
Win	59-29	(United States) Daniel DeShazer	7-0	February 26, 2025	FloWrestling: Night in America – 62 kg	(United States) Coralville, Iowa
2024 Last Chance Olympic Trials Qualifier (silver) at 57 kg
Loss	58-29	(United States) Jax Forrest	TF 0-10	April 7, 2024	2024 Last Chance Olympic Trials Qualifier	(United States) Fairfax, Virginia
Win	58-28	(United States) Brandon Courtney	TF 10–0	April 7, 2024	2024 Last Chance Olympic Trials Qualifier	(United States) Fairfax, Virginia
Win	56-29	(United States) Haakon Peterson	TF 10–0	April 7, 2024	2024 Last Chance Olympic Trials Qualifier	(United States) Fairfax, Virginia
Win	55-29	(United States) Anthony Molton	TF 13–2	April 7, 2024	2024 Last Chance Olympic Trials Qualifier	(United States) Fairfax, Virginia
2023 World Team Trials 4th at 61 kg
Loss	54-29	(United States) Austin DeSanto	TF 4-15	May 20, 2023	2023 World Team Trials	(United States) Colorado Springs, Colorado
Win	54-28	(United States) Seth Gross	TF 10–0	May 20, 2023	2023 World Team Trials	(United States) Colorado Springs, Colorado
Loss	53-28	(United States) Nahshon Garrett	TF 0-10	May 20, 2023	2023 World Team Trials	(United States) Colorado Springs, Colorado
2023 US Open DNP at 61 kg
Loss	53-27	(United States) Nahshon Garrett	TF 0-10	April 26, 2023	2023 US Open	(United States) Las Vegas, Nevada
		(United States) Joe Colon	FF	April 26, 2023	2023 US Open	(United States) Las Vegas, Nevada
Loss	53-26	(United States) Vito Arujau	3-8	April 26, 2023	2023 US Open	(United States) Las Vegas, Nevada
Win	53-25	(United States) Daniel DeShazer	4–0	April 26, 2023	2023 US Open	(United States) Las Vegas, Nevada
2023 Dan Kolov & Nikola Petrov Tournament DNP at 61kg
Loss	52-25	(Georgia (country)) Nika Zakashvili	6-9	March 2, 2023	2023 Dan Kolov & Nikola Petrov Tournament	Sofia, Bulgaria
2021 US World Team Trials (silver) at 61 kg
Loss	52–24	(United States) Daton Fix	0–7	September 12, 2021	2021 US World Team Trials	(United States) Lincoln, Nebraska
Loss	52–23	(United States) Daton Fix	3–8	September 12, 2021	2021 US World Team Trials	(United States) Lincoln, Nebraska
Win	52–22	(United States) Joe Colon	TF 15–2	September 11, 2021	2021 US World Team Trials	(United States) Lincoln, Nebraska
Win	51–22	(United States) Nick Suriano	3–0	September 11, 2021	2021 US World Team Trials	(United States) Lincoln, Nebraska
Win	50–22	(United States) Daniel Deshazer	TF 11–1	September 11, 2021	2021 US World Team Trials	(United States) Lincoln, Nebraska
2021 Poland Open DNP at 61 kg
Loss	49–22	(India) Ravi Kumar Dahiya	5–9	June 9, 2021	2021 Poland Open	Warsaw, Poland
Loss	49–21	(Uzbekistan) Gulomjon Abdullaev	TF 1–12	June 9, 2021	2021 Poland Open	Warsaw, Poland
Loss	49–20	(Kazakhstan) Adlan Askarov	TF 0–14	June 9, 2021	2021 Poland Open	Warsaw, Poland
2020 US Olympic Team Trials (bronze) at 57 kg
Win	49–19	(United States) Zane Richards	12–6	April 2–3, 2021	2020 US Olympic Team Trials	(United States) Fort Worth, Texas
Win	48–18	(United States) Sean Russell	13–6	April 2–3, 2021	2020 US Olympic Team Trials	(United States) Fort Worth, Texas
Loss	47–18	(United States) Vito Arujau	2–3	April 2–3, 2021	2020 US Olympic Team Trials	(United States) Fort Worth, Texas
2020 Cerro Pelado (silver) at 57 kg
Loss	47-17	(Cuba) Reineri Andreu	1-3	February 9–17, 2020	2020 Granma y Cerro Pelado International Open	Havana, Cuba
Win	47-16	(Uzbekistan) Nodirjon Safarov	7-0	February 9–17, 2020	2020 Granma y Cerro Pelado International Open	Havana, Cuba
Win	46-16	(Cuba) Santiago Hernandez	TF 12-2	February 9–17, 2020	2020 Granma y Cerro Pelado International Open	Havana, Cuba
2019 US Nationals (silver) at 57 kg
Loss	45-16	(United States) Spencer Lee	2-8	December 22, 2019	2019 US Nationals - US Olympic Trials Qualifier	(United States) Ford Worth, Texas
Win	45-15	(United States) Nahshon Garrett	TF 13-2	December 22, 2019	2019 US Nationals - US Olympic Trials Qualifier	(United States) Ford Worth, Texas
Win	44-15	(United States) Frank Perelli	TF 10-0	December 22, 2019	2019 US Nationals - US Olympic Trials Qualifier	(United States) Ford Worth, Texas
Win	43-15	(United States) Gabriel Townsell	TF 13-2	December 22, 2019	2019 US Nationals - US Olympic Trials Qualifier	(United States) Ford Worth, Texas
Win	42-15	(United States) Daniel DeShazer	9-2	December 22, 2019	2019 US Nationals - US Olympic Trials Qualifier	(United States) Ford Worth, Texas
2019 Bill Farrell Memorial (silver) at 57 kg
Loss	41-15	(United States) Seth Gross	TF 1-11	November 16, 2019	2019 Bill Farrell Memorial International Open	(United States) New York, New York
Win	41-14	(United States) Zane Richards	8-6	November 16, 2019	2019 Bill Farrell Memorial International Open	(United States) New York, New York
Win	40-14	(United States) Sean Russell	9-5	November 16, 2019	2019 Bill Farrell Memorial International Open	(United States) New York, New York
Win	39-14	(Ecuador) Guesseppe Rea	TF 11-0	November 16, 2019	2019 Bill Farrell Memorial International Open	(United States) New York, New York
Win	38-14	(Honduras) Brandon Escobar	TF 10-0	November 16, 2019	2019 Bill Farrell Memorial International Open	(United States) New York, New York
2019 US Open 6th at 57 kg
Loss	37-14	(United States) Thomas Gilman	DQ	April 28, 2019	2019 US Open Wrestling Championships	(United States) Las Vegas, Nevada
Win	37-13	(United States) Frank Perrelli	TF 10-0	April 28, 2019	2019 US Open Wrestling Championships	(United States) Las Vegas, Nevada
Win	36-13	(United States) Eddie Klimara	TF 12-1	April 28, 2019	2019 US Open Wrestling Championships	(United States) Las Vegas, Nevada
Win	35-13	(United States) Skyler Petry	TF 12-2	April 28, 2019	2019 US Open Wrestling Championships	(United States) Las Vegas, Nevada
2017 US U23 World Team Trials (silver) at 57 kg
Loss	34-13	(United States) Daton Fix	4-7	October 8, 2017	2017 US U23 World Team Trials	(United States) Rochester, Minnesota
Loss	34-12	(United States) Daton Fix	7-8	October 8, 2017	2017 US U23 World Team Trials	(United States) Rochester, Minnesota
Win	34-11	(United States) Timothy Lambert	TF 10-0	October 8, 2017	2017 US U23 World Team Trials Challenge Tournament	(United States) Rochester, Minnesota
Win	33-11	(United States) Gage Curry	TF 12-1	October 8, 2017	2017 US U23 World Team Trials Challenge Tournament	(United States) Rochester, Minnesota
2017 Alexander Medved Prizes (silver) at 57 kg
Loss	32-11	(Russia) Nikolai Okhlopkov	1-5	September 16, 2017	2017 Alexander Medved Prizes Memorial International	Minsk, Belarus
Win	32-10	(Russia) Michail Ivanov	6-1	September 16, 2017	2017 Alexander Medved Prizes Memorial International	Minsk, Belarus
Win	31-10	(Ukraine) Armen Arakelian	TF 10-0	September 16, 2017	2017 Alexander Medved Prizes Memorial International	Minsk, Belarus
Win	30-10	(Kazakhstan) Azamat Toibek	TF 13-2	September 16, 2017	2017 Alexander Medved Prizes Memorial International	Minsk, Belarus
2017 Ion Corneanu Memorial (gold) at 57 kg
Win	29-10	(Russia) Nikolai Okhlopkov	8-1	June 23, 2017	2017 Ion Corneanu & Ladislau Simon Memorial	Bucharest, Romania
Win	28-10	(Romania) Ivan Guidea	11-5	June 23, 2017	2017 Ion Corneanu & Ladislau Simon Memorial	Bucharest, Romania
Win	27-10	(Moldova) Ivan Zamfirov	TF 12-2	June 23, 2017	2017 Ion Corneanu & Ladislau Simon Memorial	Bucharest, Romania
2017 US World Team Trials Challenge (silver) at 57 kg
Win	26-10	(United States) Tyler Graff	6-2	June 10, 2017	2017 US World Team Trials Challenge Tournament	(United States) Lincoln, Nebraska
Loss	25-10	(United States) Thomas Gilman	2-6	June 10, 2017	2017 US World Team Trials Challenge Tournament	(United States) Lincoln, Nebraska
Win	25-9	(United States) Alan Waters	8-5	June 10, 2017	2017 US World Team Trials Challenge Tournament	(United States) Lincoln, Nebraska
Win	24-9	(United States) Frank Perrelli	7-3	June 10, 2017	2017 US World Team Trials Challenge Tournament	(United States) Lincoln, Nebraska
2017 US Open (bronze) at 57 kg
Win	23-9	(United States) Frank Perrelli	9-7	April 28, 2017	2017 US Open Wrestling Championships	(United States) Las Vegas, Nevada
Win	22-9	(United States) Zach Sanders	6-4	April 28, 2017	2017 US Open Wrestling Championships	(United States) Las Vegas, Nevada
Loss	21-9	(United States) Tony Ramos	2-2	April 28, 2017	2017 US Open Wrestling Championships	(United States) Las Vegas, Nevada
Win	21-8	(United States) Nico Megaludis	5-4	April 28, 2017	2017 US Open Wrestling Championships	(United States) Las Vegas, Nevada
Win	20-8	(United States) Paul Konrath	TF 10-0	April 28, 2017	2017 US Open Wrestling Championships	(United States) Las Vegas, Nevada
Win	19-8	(United States) Sean Donnelly	TF 10-0	April 28, 2017	2017 US Open Wrestling Championships	(United States) Las Vegas, Nevada
2016 US Olympic Team Trials Challenge at 57 kg
Loss	18-8	(United States) Alan Waters	0-6	April 9, 2016	2016 US Olympic Team Trials Challenge Tournament	(United States) Iowa City, Iowa
Win	18-7	(United States) Angel Escobedo	Injury	April 9, 2016	2016 US Olympic Team Trials Challenge Tournament	(United States) Iowa City, Iowa
Loss	17-7	(United States) Tyler Graff	TF 0-10	April 9, 2016	2016 US Olympic Team Trials Challenge Tournament	(United States) Iowa City, Iowa
Win	17-6	(United States) Nico Megaludis	4-3	April 9, 2016	2016 US Olympic Team Trials Challenge Tournament	(United States) Iowa City, Iowa
2015 US Nationals 5th at 57 kg
Win	16-6	(United States) Joe Colon	Injury	December 18, 2015	2015 US Senior National Wrestling Championships	(United States) Las Vegas, Nevada
Loss	15-6	(United States) Coleman Scott	TF 0-10	December 18, 2015	2015 US Senior National Wrestling Championships	(United States) Las Vegas, Nevada
Win	15-5	(United States) Ali Naser	3-1	December 18, 2015	2015 US Senior National Wrestling Championships	(United States) Las Vegas, Nevada
Win	14-5	(Serbia) Stevan Mićić	4-2	December 18, 2015	2015 US Senior National Wrestling Championships	(United States) Las Vegas, Nevada
Loss	13-5	(United States) Joe Colon	Fall	December 18, 2015	2015 US Senior National Wrestling Championships	(United States) Las Vegas, Nevada
Win	13-4	(United States) Dan Mitcheff	TF 10-0	December 18, 2015	2015 US Senior National Wrestling Championships	(United States) Las Vegas, Nevada
Win	12-4	(United States) Rene Ruiz	TF 10-0	December 18, 2015	2015 US Senior National Wrestling Championships	(United States) Las Vegas, Nevada
2015 Bill Farrell Memorial at 57 kg
Loss	11-4	(United States) Ali Naser	6-6	November 7, 2015	2015 Bill Farrell Memorial International	(United States) New York, New York
Win	11-3	(United States) Obenson Blanc	4-3	November 7, 2015	2015 Bill Farrell Memorial International	(United States) New York, New York
Win	10-3	(United States) Nick Simmons	5-3	November 7, 2015	2015 Bill Farrell Memorial International	(United States) New York, New York
Loss	9-3	(United States) Daniel Dennis	2-5	November 7, 2015	2015 Bill Farrell Memorial International	(United States) New York, New York
Win	9-2	(United States) Bradley Pataky	9-1	November 7, 2015	2015 Bill Farrell Memorial International	(United States) New York, New York
Win	8-2	(Canada) Michael Arciaga	TF 10-0	November 7, 2015	2015 Bill Farrell Memorial International	(United States) New York, New York
2015 ASICS US Senior Nationals at 57 kg
Loss	7-2	(United States) Matt McDonough	4-6	June 7, 2015	2015 ASICS USA Wrestling National Championships	(United States) Las Vegas, Nevada
Win	7-1	(United States) Frank Perrelli	9-1	June 7, 2015	2015 ASICS USA Wrestling National Championships	(United States) Las Vegas, Nevada
Win	6-1	(United States) Brad Pataky	10-5	June 7, 2015	2015 ASICS USA Wrestling National Championships	(United States) Las Vegas, Nevada
Win	5-1	(United States) Devane Dodgens	TF 10-0	June 7, 2015	2015 ASICS USA Wrestling National Championships	(United States) Las Vegas, Nevada
Loss	4-1	(United States) Tyler Graff	Fall	June 7, 2015	2015 ASICS USA Wrestling National Championships	(United States) Las Vegas, Nevada
2014 Northeast Regional (gold) at 57 kg
Win	4-0	(United States) Ben Willeford	TF 10-0	May 4, 2014	2014 Phil Portuese NE Regional	(United States) East Stroudsburg, Pennsylvania
Win	3-0	(United States) Steven Mytych	TF 11-0	May 4, 2014	2014 Phil Portuese NE Regional	(United States) East Stroudsburg, Pennsylvania
Win	2-0	(United States) Tanner Shoap	TF 13-2	May 4, 2014	2014 Phil Portuese NE Regional	(United States) East Stroudsburg, Pennsylvania
Win	1-0	(United States) Joshjos Antoine	TF 11-0	May 4, 2014	2014 Phil Portuese NE Regional	(United States) East Stroudsburg, Pennsylvania

== NCAA record ==
NCAA Division I Record
Res.	Record	Opponent	Score	Date	Event
End of 2017-2018 Season (senior year)
2018 NCAA Championships (bronze) at 125 lbs
Win	100-8	Ethan Lizak	SV-1 8-6	March 17, 2018	2018 NCAA Division I National Championships
Win	99-8	Sebastian Rivera	Fall	March 17, 2018	2018 NCAA Division I National Championships
Loss	98-8	Spencer Lee	Fall	March 17, 2018	2018 NCAA Division I National Championships
Win	98-7	Taylor LaMont	MD 12-4	March 17, 2018	2018 NCAA Division I National Championships
Win	97-7	Ryan Millhof	INJ	March 17, 2018	2018 NCAA Division I National Championships
Win	96-7	Gabe Townsell	Fall	March 17, 2018	2018 NCAA Division I National Championships
2018 Big Ten Conference (gold) at 125 lbs
Win	95-7	Ethan Lizak	10-7	March 4, 2018	2018 Big Ten Conference Championships
Win	94-7	Spencer Lee	2-1	March 4, 2018	2018 Big Ten Conference Championships
Win	93-7	Luke Welch	MD 14-3	March 4, 2018	2018 Big Ten Conference Championships
Win	92-7	Carson Kuhn	TF 21-6	March 4, 2018	2018 Big Ten Conference Championships
Win	91-7	Sean Fausz	12-6	Feb 18, 2018	Ohio State- North Carolina State Dual
Win	90-7	Drew Mattin	TF 20-5	Feb 11, 2019	Ohio State - Michigan Dual
Win	89-7	Carson Kuhn	MD 21-12	Feb 8, 2019	Ohio State - Penn State Dual
Win	88-7	Luke Welch	MD 18-5	January 28, 2018	Purdue - Ohio State Dual
Win	87-7	Rayvon Foley	7-3	Jan 26, 2018	Ohio State - Michigan State Dual
Loss	86-7	Spencer Lee	2-3	Jan 21, 2018	Iowa - Ohio State
Win	86-6	Ethan Lizak	TF 18-3	January 12, 2018	Minnesota - Ohio State Dual
Win	85-6	Brandon Cray	TF 18-2	January 5, 2018	Ohio State - Maryland Dual
Start of 2017-2018 Season (senior year)
End of 2016-2017 Season (junior year)
2017 NCAA Championships (bronze) at 133 lbs
Win	84-6	Stevan Mićić	5-2	March 18, 2017	2017 NCAA Division I National Championships
Win	83-6	Eric Montoya	4-1	March 18, 2017	2017 NCAA Division I National Championships
Loss	82-6	Cory Clark	4-7	March 18, 2017	2017 NCAA Division I National Championships
Win	82-5	Zane Richards	3-1	March 18, 2017	2017 NCAA Division I National Championships
Win	81-5	Cam Sykora	MD 21-7	March 18, 2017	2017 NCAA Division I National Championships
Win	80-5	Korbin Myers	MD 13-4	March 18, 2017	2017 NCAA Division I National Championships
2017 Big Ten Conference (gold) at 133 lbs
Win	79-5	Cory Clark	5-4	March 3, 2017	2017 Big Ten Conference Championships
Win	78-5	Stevan Mićić	6-5	March 3, 2017	2017 Big Ten Conference Championships
Win	77-5	Scott DelVecchio	6-4	March 3, 2017	2017 Big Ten Conference Championships
Win	76-5	Mark Grey	Fall	February 18, 2018	Ohio State - Cornell Dual
Win	75-5	Mitch McKee	Fall	Feb 12, 2017	Ohio State - Minnesota Dual
Win	74-5	Eric Montoya	5-2	Feb 10, 2017	Ohio State - Nebraska Dual
Win	73-5	Scott DelVecchio	6-5	February 6, 2017	Rutgers - Ohio State Dual
Win	72-5	George Carpenter	TF 22-7	February 3, 2017	Penn State - Ohio State Dual
Win	71-5	Phillip Laux	10-3	Jan 27, 2017	Ohio State - Iowa Dual
Win	70-5	Billy Rappo	MD 15-5	Jan 22, 2017	Maryland - Ohio State Dual
Win	69-5	Zane Richards	MD 12-4	January 15, 2017	Illinois - Ohio State Dual
Win	68-5	Michael Cullen	MD 18-5	January 6, 2017	Ohio State - Wisconsin Dual
Win	67-5	Jason Isparides	TF 20-4	December 18, 2016	Northwestern - Ohio State Dual
Win	66-5	Jaydin Eierman	MD 12-2	December 8, 2016	Missouri - Ohio State Dual
2016 Cliff Keen Las Vegas Invitational (gold) at 133 lbs
Win	65-5	Stevan Mićić	3-2	December 3, 2016	2016 Cliff Keen Las Vegas Invitational
Win	64-5	Mark Grey	8-3	December 3, 2016	2016 Cliff Keen Las Vegas Invitational
Win	63-5	Ali Naser	9-4	December 3, 2016	2016 Cliff Keen Las Vegas Invitational
Win	62-5	Shayne Wireman	10-3	December 3, 2016	2016 Cliff Keen Las Vegas Invitational
Win	61-5	Dom Latona	TF 22-7	December 3, 2016	2016 Cliff Keen Las Vegas Invitational
Start of 2016-2017 Season (junior year)
End of 2015-2016 Season (sophomore year)
2016 NCAA Championships (bronze) at 125 lbs
Win	60-5	David Terao	5-3	March 19, 2016	2016 NCAA Division I National Championships
Win	59-5	Conor Youtsey	MD 10-1	March 19, 2016	2016 NCAA Division I National Championships
Loss	58-5	Thomas Gilman	SV–1 Fall	March 19, 2016	2016 NCAA Division I National Championships
Win	58-4	Dylan Peters	10-4	March 19, 2016	2016 NCAA Division I National Championships
Win	57-4	Elijah Oliver	MD 11-2	March 19, 2016	2016 NCAA Division I National Championships
Win	56-4	Kyle Larson	TF 18-0	March 19, 2016	2016 NCAA Division I National Championships
2016 Big Ten Conference (gold) at 125 lbs
Win	55-4	Nico Megaludis	TB-1 3-1	March 6, 2016	2016 Big Ten Conference Championships
Win	54-4	Tim Lambert	10-5	March 6, 2016	2016 Big Ten Conference Championships
Win	53-4	Sean McCabe	TF 20-5	March 6, 2016	2016 Big Ten Conference Championships
Win	52-4	Ben Thornton	TF 20-2	March 6, 2016	2016 Big Ten Conference Championships
Win	51-4	Sean Russell	Fall	Feb 22, 2016	Edinboro -Ohio State Dual
Win	50-4	John Jimenez	TF 20-5	February 12, 2016	Wisconsin - Ohio State Dual
Win	49-4	Nico Megaludis	3-1	Feb 5, 2016	Ohio State - Penn State Dual
Win	48-4	Luke Schroeder	Fall	Jan 31, 2016	Ohio State - Purdue Dual
Win	47-4	Elijah Oliver	MD 17-5	January 29, 2016	Ohio State - Indiana Dual
Win	46-4	Mitch Rogaliner	TF 21-6	January 24, 2016	Michigan State - Ohio State Dual
Win	45-4	Tim Lambert	MD 16-5	January 17, 2016	Nebraska - Ohio State Dual
Win	44-4	Conor Youtsey	4-2	January 9, 2016	Michigan - Ohio State Dual
Win	43-4	Francis Edelen	TF 18-3	January 3, 2016	Ohio State - Illinois Dual
Win	42-4	Barlow McGhee	MD 10-1	December 12, 2015	Ohio State - Missouri Dual
2015 Cliff Keen Invitational (gold) at 125 lbs
Win	41-4	Joey Dance	5-4	December 5, 2015	2015 Cliff Keen Las Vegas Invitational
Win	40-4	Ryan Milhoff	MD 11-3	December 5, 2015	2015 Cliff Keen Las Vegas Invitational
Win	39-4	Paul Petrov	9-4	December 5, 2015	2015 Cliff Keen Las Vegas Invitational
Win	38-4	Skylar Petry	MD 14-3	December 5, 2015	2015 Cliff Keen Las Vegas Invitational
Win	37-4	Connor Bolling	Fall	December 5, 2015	2015 Cliff Keen Las Vegas Invitational
Win	36-4	Evan Cheek	TF 23-7	November 24, 2015	Ohio State - Cleveland State Dual
Win	35-4	Ares Carpio	MD 16-6	November 20, 2015	Arizona State - Ohio State Dual
Win	34-4	Nick Herrmann	MD 14-6	November 13, 2015	Virginia - Ohio State Dual
Start of 2015-2016 Season (sophomore year)
End of 2014-2015 Season (freshman year)
2015 NCAA Championships (gold) at 125 lbs
Win	33-4	Zeke Moisey	9-5	March 21, 2015	2015 NCAA Division I National Championships
Win	32-4	Alan Waters	4-2	March 21, 2015	2015 NCAA Division I National Championships
Win	31-4	Kory Mines	TF 16-1	March 21, 2015	2015 NCAA Division I National Championships
Win	30-4	Ben Willeford	MD 11-3	March 21, 2015	2015 NCAA Division I National Championships
Win	29-4	Joe DeAngelo	MD 10-2	March 21, 2015	2015 NCAA Division I National Championships
2015 Big Ten Conference (gold) at 125 lbs
Win	28-4	Thomas Gilman	3-2	March 7, 2015	2015 Big Ten Conference Championships
Win	27-4	Jesse Delgado	3-2	March 7, 2015	2015 Big Ten Conference Championships
Win	26-4	Conor Youtsey	5-2	March 7, 2015	2015 Big Ten Conference Championships
Win	25-4	John Jimenez	7-2	March 7, 2015	2015 Big Ten Conference Championships
Win	24-4	Scott Parker	10-3	February 21, 2015	Ohio State - Lehigh Dual (National Duals)
Win	23-4	Kory Mines	MD 13-2	February 15, 2015	Ohio State - Edinboro Dual
Win	22-4	Ethan Lizak	MD 19-6	February 6, 2015	Minnesota - Ohio State Dual
Win	21-4	Josh Patrick	TF 23-8	Feb 1, 2015	Ohio State - Rutgers Dual
Win	20-4	Aaron Assad	MD 11-5	Jan 30, 2015	Purdue - Ohio State Dual
Win	19-4	Josh Polacek	TF 15-0	January 25, 2015	Ohio State - Maryland Dual
Win	18-4	Forfeit	FF	January 23, 2015	Indiana - Ohio State Dual
Win	17-4	Conor Youtsey	MD 16-7	Jan 18, 2015	Ohio State - Michigan Dual
Win	16-4	Mitch Rogaliner	TF 25-9	Jan 16, 2015	Ohio State - Michigan State Dual
Win	15-4	Jordan Conaway	11-2	January 11, 2015	Penn State - Ohio State Dual
Loss	14-4	Thomas Gilman	TB–1 1-2	January 4, 2015	Iowa - Ohio State Dual
Loss	14-3	Alan Waters	8-11	December 14, 2014	Missouri - Ohio State Dual
2014 Cliff Keen Las Vegas Invitational (bronze) at 125 lbs
Win	14-2	Trey Andrews	11-4	December 5, 2014	2014 Cliff Keen Las Vegas Invitational
Win	13-2	Josh Martinez	6-2	December 5, 2014	2014 Cliff Keen Las Vegas Invitational
Win	12-2	Ronnie Bresser	4-3	December 5, 2014	2014 Cliff Keen Las Vegas Invitational
Win	11-2	Conor Youtsey	8-3	December 5, 2014	2014 Cliff Keen Las Vegas Invitational
Loss	10-2	Dylan Peters	Fall	December 5, 2014	2014 Cliff Keen Las Vegas Invitational
Win	10-1	Zeke Moisey	15-10	December 5, 2014	2014 Cliff Keen Las Vegas Invitational
Win	9-1	Kevin Hunt	Fall	December 5, 2014	2014 Cliff Keen Las Vegas Invitational
Win	8-1	Will Mason	MD 18-8	November 24, 2014	Ohio State - Virginia Dual
Loss	7-1	Joey Dance	6-7	November 23, 2014	Ohio State - Virginia Tech Dual
Win	7-0	Sean Badua	Fall	November 15, 2014	Ohio State - Army Dual
Win	6-0	Judson Preskitt	Fall	November 15, 2014	Arizona State - Ohio State Dual
Win	5-0	Edilberto Vinas	TF 20-5	November 13, 2014	Kent State - Ohio State Dual
2014 Michigan State Open (gold) at 125 lbs
Win	4-0	Stevan Mićić	MD 11-2	November 2, 2014	2014 Michigan State Open
Win	3-0	Johnson Mai	MD 18-5	November 2, 2014	2014 Michigan State Open
Win	2-0	Zeke Moisey	MD 19-6	November 2, 2014	2014 Michigan State Open
Win	1-0	Robert Elliot	TF 16-0	November 2, 2014	2014 Michigan State Open
Start of 2014-2015 Season (freshman year)

=== Stats ===
Season	Year	School	Rank	Weigh Class	Record	Win	Bonus
2018	Senior	Ohio State University	#2 (3rd)	125	16–2	88.89%	55.56%
2017	Junior	Ohio State University	#1 (3rd)	133	24–1	96.00%	48.00%
2016	Sophomore	Ohio State University	#1 (3rd)	125	27–1	96.43%	67.86%
2015	Freshman	Ohio State University	#3 (1st)	125	33–4	88.19%	51.35%
Career					100–8	92.59%	55.69%

== Awards and honors ==
2019

- (silver) US Nationals (57 kg)

2018

- (bronze) NCAA Division I (125 lbs)
- (gold) Big Ten Conference (125 lbs)

2017

- (silver) US World Trials Challenge (57 kg)
- (silver) US World Trials (U23) (57 kg)
- (bronze) US Open (57 kg)
- (bronze) NCAA Division I (133 lbs)
- (gold) Big Ten Conference (133 lbs)

2016

- (bronze) NCAA Division I (125 lbs)
- (gold) Big Ten Conference (125 lbs)

2015

- (gold) NCAA Division I (125 lbs)
- (gold) Big Ten Conference (125 lbs)

Achievements
New championship	1st RAF Bantamweight Champion; August 30, 2025 – January 10, 2026	Succeeded by Austin DeSanto
