= Vito Arujau =

American wrestler (born 1999)

Personal information
- Full name: Vitali Arujau
- Born: June 1, 1999 (age 27) Gomel, Belarus
- Home town: Syosset, New York, U.S.
- Height: 1.70 m (5 ft 7 in)
- Weight: 65 kg (143 lb)

Sport
- Country: United States
- Sport: Wrestling
- Events: Freestyle and Folkstyle
- College team: Cornell University
- Club: Spartan Combat RTC; Titan Mercury Wrestling Club
- Team: USA
- Coached by: Mike Grey; Vugar Orujov
Medal record
Men's freestyle wrestling
Representing the United States
World Championships
Gold medal – first place	2023 Belgrade	61 kg
Bronze medal – third place	2024 Tirana	61 kg
Pan American Championships
Gold medal – first place	2021 Guatemala	57 kg
Gold medal – first place	2023 Buenos Aires	61 kg
Grand Prix
Silver medal – second place	2025 Warsaw	61 kg
Bronze medal – third place	2022 Warsaw	57 kg
Bronze medal – third place	2023 Budapest	61 kg
Bronze medal – third place	2026 Tirana	65 kg
US National Championships
Gold medal – first place	2020 Coralville	57 kg
Gold medal – first place	2023 Las Vegas	61 kg
Bronze medal – third place	2019 Fort Worth	57 kg
U20 World Championships
Silver medal – second place	2019 Tallinn	57 kg
U17 World Championships
Silver medal – second place	2016 Tbilisi	58 kg
Men's collegiate wrestling
Representing the Cornell Big Red
NCAA Division I Championships
Gold medal – first place	2023 Tulsa	133 lb
Gold medal – first place	2024 Kansas City	133 lb
Bronze medal – third place	2022 Detroit	125 lb
EIWA Championships
Gold medal – first place	2022 Ithaca	125 lb
Gold medal – first place	2023 Philadelphia	133 lb
Silver medal – second place	2019 Vestal	125 lb
Silver medal – second place	2024 Lewisburg	133 lb

Vitali Arujau (Belarusian: Віталій Аруджаў; Azerbaijani: Vitali Orucov; born June 1, 1999) is an American freestyle and former folkstyle wrestler who competes at 65 kilograms and formerly at 61 kilograms. In freestyle, he became the World Champion in 2023 and a two-time World medalist in 2024, among other feats.

In folkstyle, Arujau was a two-time NCAA Division I national champion, a four-time All American and a two-time EIWA Conference champion out of Cornell University.

== Background ==
Arujau was born Azerbaijani descent family in Gomel, Belarus, and moved to the United States at the age of two, after his mother won the green card lottery. His father, Vugar Orujov, was a two-time World champion in freestyle wrestling. His mother, Zhanna Sarnauskaya, was a USSR National champion in solo kayaking.

After a short stay in California, the Arujau family moved to Long Island, New York, where he would start wrestling at the age of ten, under his father's guidance.

== Career ==
=== High school ===
Arujau attended Syosset High School in Syosset, New York. He started wrestling on the varsity team as an eighth grader and placed second at the state tournament that year, losing to eventual teammate Yianni Diakomihalis in the 99-pound final. After his setback in the state finals, he did not lose another match during high-school career and graduated with a 216–1 record and four NYSPHSAA Division I state titles to his name.

In freestyle, Arujau was a U17 World silver medalist and a multiple-time U17 US National champion while in high school. In 2015, fresh off his second state title, Arujau committed to Cornell University.

=== Cornell University ===
==== 2017–2018 ====
Arujau chose to grayshirt during his first year at Cornell, racking up a 9–1 record and a Cleveland State Open title while wrestling unattached during 2017.

Focusing in freestyle during 2018, Arujau recorded a fourth-place finish at the U20 US Open and a runner-up finish at the U20 US World Team Trials before claiming the U23 US World Team Trials title at 61 kilograms. However, he was forced to pull out from the U23 World Championships.

==== 2018–2019 ====
As a freshman, Arujau went 5–1 at 133 pounds before moving down to 125, improving to 23–1 during regular season. At the EIWA Conference Championships, Arujau placed second, losing a close match to eventual NCAA champion Pat Glory in the finals. At the NCAA championships, Arujau placed fourth to become an All-American, earning upset victories over the second and fourth seeds as the eight seed himself. He closed out the season with a 31–4 record.

Fresh off All-American honors, Arujau switched back to freestyle, cut down to 57 kilograms and placed fourth at the US Open National championships in April. In May, he decided to compete at the US World Team Trials in the U20 level, sweeping the field with six victories to earn the spot. Arujau then claimed a silver medal at the U20 World Championships in August, notably defeating returning champion Akhmed Idrisov in the semifinals.

In December, Arujau went back up to the senior level and placed third at the US National Championships, notably defeating reigning NCAA champion Nick Suriano before falling to three-time age-group world champion Spencer Lee. This result had him qualify for the US Olympic Team Trials in 2020.

==== 2020 ====
Arujau chose to take an Olympic redshirt for the 2019–2020 folkstyle season and focused in freestyle instead. In January, Arujau competed at the prestigious Golden Grand Prix Ivan Yarygin, and was eliminated after a close opening match.

He was then set to compete at the US Olympic Team Trials in April, however, the event was postponed for 2021 along with the Summer Olympics due to the COVID-19 pandemic. In July, he defeated Sammy Alvarez at FloWrestling: Dake vs. Chamizo, and was set to wrestle NCAA finalist Jack Mueller at Beat The Streets in September, but was forced to pull out. He ended up defeating Mueller a month later at the US National Championships, along with four others to claim his first national title.

Arujau was expected to compete in folkstyle during the 2020–2021 season. However, it was announced on November 13, 2020, that the Ivy League had canceled all winter sports for the season.

Arujau then took part at the FloWrestling: RTC Cup in December, notably defeating NCAA champions Darian Cruz in one match and Nahshon Garrett twice, as well as Jack Mueller once again.

==== 2021 ====
A few days after a quick victory over Michael Colaiocco at SCRTC I in January, Arujau secured a fifth-place finish at the Henri Deglane Grand Prix of France, defeating two foreign opponents yet losing to World silver medalist and fellow American Thomas Gilman and U20 World medalist Beka Bujiashvili.

He followed that up in February with three wins at the America's Cup and two wins at the NLWC V, all over All-Americans. In March he got a victory in a dual meet against the NJRTC.

Arujau then competed at the rescheduled US Olympic Team Trials in April, in an attempt to represent the United States at the 2020 Summer Olympics. He cruised to the best-of-three finals by defeating NCAA champion Nathan Tomasello and U20 World Champion Daton Fix. In the finals, Arujau fell twice to eventual Olympic bronze medalist Thomas Gilman, earning runner–up honors.

As the US Olympic alternate, Arujau competed at the Pan American Continental Championships in May, replacing an injured Thomas Gilman. He racked up three quick victories to claim the championship.

==== 2021–2022 ====
After two seasons off, Arujau returned to the Cornell lineup competing at 125 pounds after a season-opener match at 133 pounds, and finished the regular season with a 10–1 record. He avenged his lone loss with a major decision and claimed his first EIWA title against Pat Glory in the post-season. The second-seed at the NCAA tournament, Arujau made the semifinals to set up a rubber-match with Glory, where he was in the losing-end of a major decision. He then recovered with a pair of wins in the consolation side of the bracket to claim third place, become a two-time All-American and close out the season at 19–2.

In May, he swept the field at the US World Team Trials Challenge tournament to qualify for Final X, where he fell twice to returning World champion Thomas Gilman in June. In July, he claimed a bronze medal from the Poland Open, and accepted an offer for the U23 US World Team spot as a Final X contestant. At the U23 World Championships, Arujau was eliminated in the opening round.

==== 2022–2023 ====
Back to folkstyle, Arujau compiled a 16–1 record and a Cliff Keen Invitational title during regular season, before claiming his second EIWA title at 133 pounds. At the NCAA tournament, Arujau avenged his lone loss to Sam Latona before upsetting three-time NCAA finalist Daton Fix to cruise to the finals and pull off another upset, now over two-time and reigning NCAA champion Roman Bravo-Young, becoming a national champion. After the tournament, Arujau was named the Outstanding Wrestler.

Fresh off an NCAA title, Arujau moved up to 61 kilograms and became the US Open champion with wins over NCAA champions Nahshon Garrett and Nathan Tomasello and multiple-time All-American Austin DeSanto. In May, he claimed his second Pan American title with four technical fall victories.

In June, Arujau defeated Nahshon Garrett in two straight high-action matches at Final X to make the US World Team. In July, he took third at the Polyák Imre & Varga János Memorial Tournament, with a lone close loss to reigning World champion Zelimkhan Abakarov.

In September, Arujau competed at the World Championships, where after four dominant victories to make the finals, he defeated former World champion Abasgadzhi Magomedov in a tight-scored match to become the second World champion in the Arujau family, after his father Vugar.

==== 2023–2024 ====
Back to folkstyle off of his World Championship performance in Belgrade, Arujau returned for his senior year at Cornell. After a 10–1 regular season, Arujau fell to freshman phenom Ryan Crookham in the EIWA Championship finals, who also handed him his lone regular season loss. At the NCAA tournament, Arujau, the sixth-seed, cruised to the finals by avenging his losses to Crookham with a major decision, and became a two-time NCAA Division I National champion with a win over four-time NCAA finalist Daton Fix in the finals. He closed out the year with a 18–2 record and finished his collegiate career with back-to-back titles. While at Cornell he was a member of Quill and Dagger.

=== Post-collegiate career ===
==== 2024 ====
Arujau was then expected to trim down to 57 kilograms in order to compete at the US Olympic Team Trials in April, with a bid directly to the semifinals as a World champion in a non-Olympic weight class. However, he decided to stay at 61 kilograms and focus in the US World Team Trials.

In September, Arujau competed at the US World Team Trials, sitting in the best-of-three finals as the returning World champion. He defeated U17 World champion Marcus Blaze twice in a row in order to book his second-straight trip to the World Championships, set to take place in October.

By the end of October, Arujau competed at the World Championships, attempting to defend his title. Opening up with wins over India and European champion Azamat Tuskaev from Serbia, he was then knocked off by reigning U20 World champion Masanosuke Ono from Japan in the semifinals, falling into the bronze medal match. Arujau became a two-time World medalist, clinging to a victory over Olympic champion Zaur Uguev from Russia in order to earn the bronze.

==== 2025 ====
In April, Arujau accepted his berth to Final X as a returning World medalist, and will compete against US National champion Jax Forrest for the US World Team spot in June.

== Freestyle record ==
Senior Freestyle Matches
Res.	Record	Opponent	Score	Date	Event	Location
2026 US Open 7th at 65 kg
Win		(United States) Brock Hardy	FF	April 24–25, 2026	2026 US Open National Championships	(United States) Las Vegas, Nevada
Loss	76–20	(United States) David Evans	6–10	April 24–25, 2026	2026 US Open National Championships	(United States) Las Vegas, Nevada
Win	76–19	(United States) Nick Suriano	2–0	April 24–25, 2026	2026 US Open National Championships	(United States) Las Vegas, Nevada
Loss	75–19	(United States) Beau Bartlett	10–16	April 24–25, 2026	2026 US Open National Championships	(United States) Las Vegas, Nevada
Win	75–18	(United States) Connor Thorpe	TF 11–0	April 24–25, 2026	2026 US Open National Championships	(United States) Las Vegas, Nevada
Win	74–18	(United States) Jahleel Armstrong	TF 10–0	April 24–25, 2026	2026 US Open National Championships	(United States) Las Vegas, Nevada
2026 Muhamet Malo Ranking Series (bronze) at 65 kg
Win	73–18	(Ecuador) Josh Kramer	11–7	February 25, 2026	2026 Muhamet Malo Tournament	Tirana, Albania
Loss	72-18	(Azerbaijan) Rashid Babazade	15–18	February 25, 2026	2026 Muhamet Malo Tournament	Tirana, Albania
Win	72–17	(The Bahamas) Shannon Hanna	4–0	February 25, 2026	2026 Muhamet Malo Tournament	Tirana, Albania
Win		(Kazakhstan) Assylzhan Yessengeldi	FF	February 25, 2026	2026 Muhamet Malo Tournament	Tirana, Albania
Win	71–17	(Poland) Krzysztof Bieńkowski	6–0	February 25, 2026	2026 Muhamet Malo Tournament	Tirana, Albania
2025 Poland Open (silver) at 61 kg
Loss	70-17	(Ukraine) Kamil Kerymov	4-5	August 3, 2025	2025 Poland Open	Warsaw, Poland
Win	70-16	(United States) Devan Turner	2-0	August 3, 2025	2025 Poland Open	Warsaw, Poland
Win	69-16	(Ukraine) Andrii Dzhelep	9-6	August 3, 2025	2025 Poland Open	Warsaw, Poland
2025 US World Team Trials (silver) at 61 kg
Loss	68–16	(United States) Jax Forrest	2–7	July 14, 2025	2025 US Fargo National Championships	(United States) Fargo, North Dakota
Loss	68–15	(United States) Jax Forrest	3–4	July 14, 2025	2025 US Fargo National Championships	(United States) Fargo, North Dakota
2024 World Championships (bronze) at 61 kg
Win	68–14	Zaur Uguev	8–3	October 30–31, 2024	2024 World Championships	Tirana, Albania
Loss	67–14	(Japan) Masanosuke Ono	TF 0–12	October 30–31, 2024	2024 World Championships	Tirana, Albania
Win	67–13	(Serbia) Azamat Tuskaev	6–3	October 30–31, 2024	2024 World Championships	Tirana, Albania
Win	66–13	(India) Udit Kumar	4–2	October 30–31, 2024	2024 World Championships	Tirana, Albania
2024 US World Team Trials (gold) at 61 kg
Win	65–13	(United States) Marcus Blaze	3–1	September 15, 2024	2024 US World Team Trials	(United States) Omaha, Nebraska
Win	64–13	(United States) Marcus Blaze	2–1	September 15, 2024	2024 US World Team Trials	(United States) Omaha, Nebraska
2023 World Championships (gold) at 61 kg
Win	63–13	(Russia) Abasgadzhi Magomedov	10–9	September 16–17, 2023	2023 World Championships	Belgrade, Serbia
Win	62–13	(Kyrgyzstan) Taiyrbek Zhumashbek Uulu	TF 12–2	September 16–17, 2023	2023 World Championships	Belgrade, Serbia
Win	61–13	(Japan) Kodai Ogawa	8–2	September 16–17, 2023	2023 World Championships	Belgrade, Serbia
Win	60–13	(Bulgaria) Stilyan Iliev	TF 10–0	September 16–17, 2023	2023 World Championships	Belgrade, Serbia
Win	59–13	(Kazakhstan) Ossimzhan Dastanbek	TF 10–0	September 16–17, 2023	2023 World Championships	Belgrade, Serbia
2023 Polyàk Imre Memorial (bronze) at 61 kg
Win		(Kazakhstan) Vladimir Khudrin	FF	July 13–16, 2023	2023 Polyák Imre & Varga János Memorial Tournament	Budapest, Hungary
Win	58-13	(Mongolia) Naramkhuu Narmandakh	TF 10–0	July 13–16, 2023	2023 Polyák Imre & Varga János Memorial Tournament	Budapest, Hungary
Loss	57–13	(Albania) Zelimkhan Abakarov	0–2	July 13–16, 2023	2023 Polyák Imre & Varga János Memorial Tournament	Budapest, Hungary
2023 US World Team Trials (gold) at 61 kg
Win	57–12	(United States) Nahshon Garrett	6–5	June 10, 2023	2023 Final X Newark	(United States) Newark, New Jersey
Win	56–12	(United States) Nahshon Garrett	13–10	June 10, 2023	2023 Final X Newark	(United States) Newark, New Jersey
2023 Pan American Championships (gold) at 61 kg
Win	55–12	(Brazil) Juan de Andrade	TF 10–0	May 6, 2023	2023 Pan American Continental Championships	Buenos Aires, Argentina
Win	54–12	(Puerto Rico) Joseph Silva	TF 11–0	May 6, 2023	2023 Pan American Continental Championships	Buenos Aires, Argentina
Win	53–12	(Canada) Jason Luneau	TF 14–4	May 6, 2023	2023 Pan American Continental Championships	Buenos Aires, Argentina
Win	52–12	(Argentina) Wilson Ojeda	TF 10–0	May 6, 2023	2023 Pan American Continental Championships	Buenos Aires, Argentina
2023 US Open (gold) at 61 kg
Win	51–12	(United States) Austin DeSanto	TF 10–0	April 27–28, 2023	2023 US Open National Championships	(United States) Las Vegas, Nevada
Win	50–12	(United States) Nathan Tomasello	8–3	April 27–28, 2023	2023 US Open National Championships	(United States) Las Vegas, Nevada
Win	49–12	(United States) Nahshon Garrett	9–2	April 27–28, 2023	2023 US Open National Championships	(United States) Las Vegas, Nevada
Win	48–12	(United States) Jack Huffman	TF 14–2	April 27–28, 2023	2023 US Open National Championships	(United States) Las Vegas, Nevada
Win	47–12	(United States) Gage Curry	TF 10–0	April 27–28, 2023	2023 US Open National Championships	(United States) Las Vegas, Nevada
2022 U23 World Championships 10th at 57 kg
Loss	46–12	(Kyrgyzstan) Bekzat Almaz Uulu	6–11	October 21, 2022	2022 U23 World Championships	Pontevedra, Spain
2022 Poland Open (bronze) at 57 kg
Win	46–11	(Georgia (country)) Giorgi Gegelashvili	TF 12–2	July 20, 2022	2022 Poland Open	Warsaw, Poland
Win	45–11	(China) Zou Wanhao	8–2	July 20, 2022	2022 Poland Open	Warsaw, Poland
Loss	44–11	(Ukraine) Andriy Yatsenko	6–9	July 20, 2022	2022 Poland Open	Warsaw, Poland
Win	44–10	(Georgia (country)) Roberti Dingashvili	11–3	July 20, 2022	2022 Poland Open	Warsaw, Poland
2022 US World Team Trials (silver) at 57 kg
Loss	43–10	(United States) Thomas Gilman	TF 2–12	June 3, 2022	2022 Final X: Stillwater	(United States) Stillwater, Oklahoma
Loss	43–9	(United States) Thomas Gilman	TF 2–14	June 3, 2022	2022 Final X: Stillwater	(United States) Stillwater, Oklahoma
Win	43–8	(United States) Jakob Camacho	TF 13–0	May 21–23, 2022	2022 US World Team Trials Challenge	(United States) Coralville, Iowa
Win	42–8	(United States) Jakob Camacho	TF 10–0	May 21–23, 2022	2022 US World Team Trials Challenge	(United States) Coralville, Iowa
Win	41–8	(United States) Zane Richards	7–0	May 21–23, 2022	2022 US World Team Trials Challenge	(United States) Coralville, Iowa
Win		(United States) Greg Diakomihalis	FF	May 21–23, 2022	2022 US World Team Trials Challenge	(United States) Coralville, Iowa
2021 Pan American Championships (gold) at 57 kg
Win	40–8	(Mexico) Roberto Blanco	TF 10–0	May 30, 2021	2021 Pan American Continental Championships	Guatemala City, Guatemala
Win	39–8	(Dominican Republic) Alexander Fernández	TF 11–0	May 30, 2021	2021 Pan American Continental Championships	Guatemala City, Guatemala
Win	38–8	(Brazil) Bryan Oliveira	TF 10–0	May 30, 2021	2021 Pan American Continental Championships	Guatemala City, Guatemala
2020 US Olympic Team Trials (silver) at 57 kg
Loss	37–8	(United States) Thomas Gilman	2–2	April 2–3, 2021	2020 US Olympic Team Trials	(United States) Fort Worth, Texas
Loss	37–7	(United States) Thomas Gilman	Fall	April 2–3, 2021	2020 US Olympic Team Trials	(United States) Fort Worth, Texas
Win	37–6	(United States) Daton Fix	7–5	April 2–3, 2021	2020 US Olympic Team Trials	(United States) Fort Worth, Texas
Win	36–6	(United States) Nathan Tomasello	3–2	April 2–3, 2021	2020 US Olympic Team Trials	(United States) Fort Worth, Texas
Win	35–6	(Ecuador) Guesseppe Rea	16–8	March 5, 2021	The East Coast Clash: NJRTC vs. Spartan Combat RTC	(United States) Allentown, Pennsylvania
Win	34–6	(United States) Zach Sanders	6–0	February 23, 2021	NLWC V	(United States) State College, Pennsylvania
Win	33–6	(United States) Sean Russell	TF 14–3	February 23, 2021	NLWC V	(United States) State College, Pennsylvania
2021 America's Cup (bronze) for TBD at 57 kg
Win	32–6	(United States) Frank Perrelli	TF 15–5	February 10–11, 2021	2021 America's Cup	(United States) Concord, North Carolina
Win	31–6	(United States) Sean Rusell	TF 10–0	February 10–11, 2021	2021 America's Cup	(United States) Concord, North Carolina
Win	30–6	(United States) Daniel Deshazer	TF 10–0	February 10–11, 2021	2021 America's Cup	(United States) Concord, North Carolina
2021 Henri Deglane Grand Prix 5th at 57 kg
Loss	29–6	(Georgia (country)) Beka Bujiashvili	13–15	January 16, 2021	Grand Prix de France Henri Deglane 2021	Nice, France
Win	29–5	(Romania) Răzvan-Marian Kovacs	8–2	January 16, 2021	Grand Prix de France Henri Deglane 2021	Nice, France
Win	28–5	(Finland) Anvar Suviniitty	TF 11–1	January 16, 2021	Grand Prix de France Henri Deglane 2021	Nice, France
Loss	27–5	(United States) Thomas Gilman	2–6	January 16, 2021	Grand Prix de France Henri Deglane 2021	Nice, France
Win	27–4	(United States) Michael Colaiocco	TF 11–0	January 8, 2021	SCRTC I	(United States) Austin, Texas
FloWrestling RTC Cup (bronze) for SPWC at 59 kg
Win	26–4	(United States) Darian Cruz	TF 11–0	December 4–5, 2020	FloWrestling RTC Cup	(United States) Austin, Texas
Win	25–4	(United States) Nahshon Garrett	7–5	December 4–5, 2020	FloWrestling RTC Cup	(United States) Austin, Texas
Win	24–4	(United States) Nahshon Garrett	14–9	December 4–5, 2020	FloWrestling RTC Cup	(United States) Austin, Texas
Win	23–4	(United States) Jack Mueller	TF 11–0	December 4–5, 2020	FloWrestling RTC Cup	(United States) Austin, Texas
2020 US Nationals (gold) at 57 kg
Win	22–4	(United States) Dylan Ragusin	TF 13–3	October 10–11, 2020	2020 US Senior National Championships	(United States) Coralville, Iowa
Win	21–4	(United States) Jack Mueller	11–6	October 10–11, 2020	2020 US Senior National Championships	(United States) Coralville, Iowa
Win	20–4	(United States) Jakob Camacho	TF 11–0	October 10–11, 2020	2020 US Senior National Championships	(United States) Coralville, Iowa
Win	19–4	(United States) Jackson Nielsen	TF 10–0	October 10–11, 2020	2020 US Senior National Championships	(United States) Coralville, Iowa
Win	18–4	(United States) Jonathan Gurule	TF 11–0	October 10–11, 2020	2020 US Senior National Championships	(United States) Coralville, Iowa
Win	17–4	(United States) Sammy Alvarez	TF 16–5	July 25, 2020	FloWrestling: Dake vs. Chamizo	(United States) Austin, Texas
2020 Ivan Yarygin Grand Prix 16th at 57 kg
Loss	16–4	(Russia) Aleksandr Sabanov	11–12	January 23–26, 2020	Golden Grand Prix Ivan Yarygin 2020	Krasnoyarsk, Russia
2019 US Nationals (bronze) at 57 kg
Win		(United States) Nick Suriano	FF	December 20–22, 2019	2019 US Senior Nationals – US Olympic Trials Qualifier	(United States) Fort Worth, Texas
Win	16–3	(United States) Zach Sanders	TF 10–0	December 20–22, 2019	2019 US Senior Nationals – US Olympic Trials Qualifier	(United States) Fort Worth, Texas
Loss	15–3	(United States) Spencer Lee	TF 4–14	December 20–22, 2019	2019 US Senior Nationals – US Olympic Trials Qualifier	(United States) Fort Worth, Texas
Win	15–2	(United States) Nick Suriano	2–2	December 20–22, 2019	2019 US Senior Nationals – US Olympic Trials Qualifier	(United States) Fort Worth, Texas
Win	14–2	(United States) Zach Sanders	TF 10–0	December 20–22, 2019	2019 US Senior Nationals – US Olympic Trials Qualifier	(United States) Fort Worth, Texas
Win	13–2	(United States) Desmond Moore	TF 10–0	December 20–22, 2019	2019 US Senior Nationals – US Olympic Trials Qualifier	(United States) Fort Worth, Texas
2019 US Open 4th at 57 kg
Loss	12–2	(United States) Zane Richards	2–8	April 24–27, 2019	2019 US Open National Championships	(United States) Las Vegas, Nevada
Win	12–1	(United States) Zach Sanders	TF 11–1	April 24–27, 2019	2019 US Open National Championships	(United States) Las Vegas, Nevada
Win	11–1	(United States) Josh Rodriguez	3–2	April 24–27, 2019	2019 US Open National Championships	(United States) Las Vegas, Nevada
Loss	10–1	(United States) Daton Fix	TF 8–18	April 24–27, 2019	2019 US Open National Championships	(United States) Las Vegas, Nevada
Win	10–0	(United States) Jesse Delgado	14–10	April 24–27, 2019	2019 US Open National Championships	(United States) Las Vegas, Nevada
Win	9–0	(United States) Britain Longmire	TF 11–0	April 24–27, 2019	2019 US Open National Championships	(United States) Las Vegas, Nevada
2018 US U23 World Team Trials (gold) at 61 kg
Win	8–0	(United States) Roman Bravo-Young	TF 10–0	June 1–3, 2018	2018 US U23 World Team Trials	(United States) Akron, Ohio
Win	7–0	(United States) Roman Bravo-Young	TF 15–4	June 1–3, 2018	2018 US U23 World Team Trials	(United States) Akron, Ohio
Win	6–0	(United States) Nick Piccininni	TF 10–0	June 1–3, 2018	2018 US U23 World Team Trials	(United States) Akron, Ohio
Win	5–0	(United States) Joe Nelson	TF 10–0	June 1–3, 2018	2018 US U23 World Team Trials	(United States) Akron, Ohio
Win	4–0	(United States) Rahsun Lawrence	TF 10–0	June 1–3, 2018	2018 US U23 World Team Trials	(United States) Akron, Ohio
Win	3–0	(United States) Jeffrey Jokerst	TF 11–0	June 1–3, 2018	2018 US U23 World Team Trials	(United States) Akron, Ohio
Win	2–0	(United States) Tony DeCesare	TF 10–0	June 1–3, 2018	2018 US U23 World Team Trials	(United States) Akron, Ohio
Win	1–0	(United States) Warren Stanfield	TF 14–1	June 1–3, 2018	2018 US U23 World Team Trials	(United States) Akron, Ohio

== NCAA record ==
=== Stats ===
Season	Year	School	NCAA	Weight Class	Record	Win
2024	Senior	Cornell University	1st	133	18–2	90.00%
2023	Junior	Cornell University	1st	133	25–1	96.15%
2022	Sophomore	Cornell University	3rd	125	19–2	90.48%
2021	Olympic RS	Cornell University				
2020	Olympic RS	Cornell University				
2019	Freshman	Cornell University	4th	125	31–3	91.18%
2018	Grayshirt	Unattached	UR	133	9–1	90.00%
Career					102–9	91.89%
