= RAF 01 =

2025 wrestling event

RAF 01: Hendrickson vs. Elders
- The poster for RAF 01: Hendrickson vs. Elders
- Promotion: Real American Freestyle
- Date: August 30, 2025
- Venue: Wolstein Center
- City: Cleveland, Ohio
- Attendance: 4,500

Event chronology
RAF 01: Hendrickson vs. Elders	RAF 02: Dake vs. Makoev

RAF 01: Hendrickson vs. Elders was a freestyle wrestling event that took place on August 30, 2025, at the Wolstein Center of Cleveland State University in Cleveland, Ohio.

It was the inaugural flagship event produced by the Real American Freestyle (RAF) promotion, and aired live on Fox Nation.

== Background ==
The event began with a tribute to Real American Freestyle (RAF) co-founder Hulk Hogan, who had died in July 2025.

Commentary for the event's live Fox Nation broadcast was provided by Kurt Angle, Bubba Jenkins and Chael Sonnen.

Ben Askren was originally supposed to compete on the card, but had to withdraw after suffering complications from pneumonia.

Holly Holm was the surprise replacement for Kennedy Blades, who was not cleared for the event by NCAA. Most Valuable Promotions granted Holm an exemption to compete as Blades' replacement.

Tito Ortiz challenged Chael Sonnen during the broadcast to a future match, which Sonnen accepted. Mason Parris challenged RAF Heavyweight Champion Wyatt Hendrickson during the broadcast to a match at RAF 04, which Hendrickson accepted.

== Results ==
Main card (Fox Nation)
Weight class				Method	Round	Time	Notes
Heavyweight	(United States) Wyatt Hendrickson	def.	(Egypt) Mostafa Elders	Technical fall (14–1)	2	1:08	(Note: For the inaugural RAF Heavyweight Championship.)
Light Heavyweight	(United States) Bo Nickal	def.	(United States) Jacob Cardenas	Decision (6–4)	3	2:00	(Note: For the inaugural RAF Light Heavyweight Championship.)
Women's Middleweight	(Mexico) Alejandra Rivera	def.	(United States) Holly Holm	Decision (9–7)	3	2:00
Cruiserweight	(United States) Kyle Dake	def.	(United States) Dean Hamiti	Technical fall (11–0)	2	1:57	(Note: For the inaugural RAF Cruiserweight Championship.)
Featherweight	(United States) Real Woods	def.	(United States) Darrion Caldwell	Pinfall	2	1:29	(Note: For the inaugural RAF Featherweight Championship.)
Women's Strawweight	(United States) Sarah Hildebrandt	def.	(Mexico) Zeltzin Hernandez	Technical fall (11–0)	3	1:24	(Note: For the inaugural RAF Women's Strawweight Championship.)
Middleweight	(United States) Evan Wick	def.	(United States) Jason Nolf	Decision (10–8)	3	2:00	(Note: For the inaugural RAF Middleweight Championship.)
Lightweight	(Mexico) Austin Gomez	def.	(United States) Lance Palmer	Technical fall (11–0)	1	1:02
Lightweight	(United States) Yianni Diakomihalis	def.	(India) Bajrang Punia	Decision (5–1)	3	2:00	(Note: For the inaugural RAF Lightweight Championship.)
Bantamweight	(United States) Nathan Tomasello	def.	(United States) Matt Ramos	Decision (4–3)	3	2:00	(Note: For the inaugural RAF Bantamweight Championship.)

== Bonus awards ==
The following athletes received bonuses.

- Performance of the Night: Evan Wick

== See also ==
- List of RAF events
