= Daton Fix =

American wrestler (born 1998)

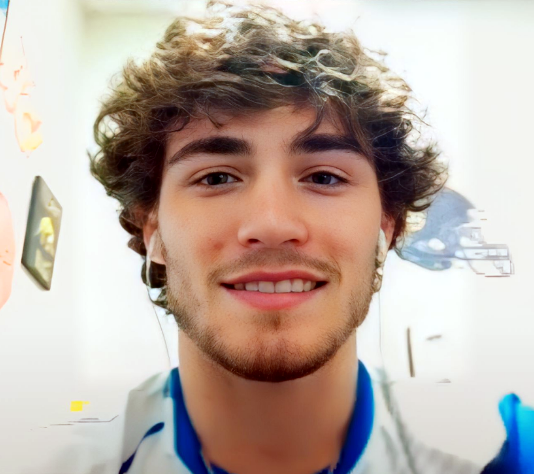
- Fix in 2017

Personal information
- Full name: Daton Duain Fix
- Born: March 11, 1998 (age 28) Sand Springs, Oklahoma, U.S.
- Height: 5 ft 4 in (163 cm)
- Weight: 61 kg (134 lb)

Sport
- Country: United States
- Sport: Wrestling
- Events: Freestyle; Folkstyle
- College team: Oklahoma State
- Club: Team BIG
- Coached by: John Smith
Medal record
Men's freestyle wrestling
Representing the United States
World Championships
Silver medal – second place	2021 Oslo	61 kg
Pan American Games
Gold medal – first place	2019 Lima	57 kg
Pan American Championships
Gold medal – first place	2022 Acapulco	61 kg
Grand Prix
Gold medal – first place	2023 Warsaw	61 kg
Gold medal – first place	2025 Varna	61 kg
US Open Championships
Gold medal – first place	2019 Las Vegas	57 kg
Silver medal – second place	2018 Las Vegas	57 kg
U20 World Championships
Gold medal – first place	2017 Tampere	55 kg
Bronze medal – third place	2016 Macon	55 kg
Bronze medal – third place	2018 Trnava	55 kg
Youth Olympic Games
Silver medal – second place	2014 Nanjing	54 kg
U17 World Championships
Bronze medal – third place	2015 Sarajevo	54 kg
Men's collegiate wrestling
Representing the Oklahoma State Cowboys
NCAA Division I Championships
Silver medal – second place	2019 Pittsburgh	133 lb
Silver medal – second place	2021 St. Louis	133 lb
Silver medal – second place	2022 Detroit	133 lb
Silver medal – second place	2024 Kansas City	133 lb
Big 12 Championships
Gold medal – first place	2019 Tulsa	133 lb
Gold medal – first place	2021 Tulsa	133 lb
Gold medal – first place	2022 Tulsa	133 lb
Gold medal – first place	2023 Tulsa	133 lb
Gold medal – first place	2024 Tulsa	133 lb

Daton Duain Fix (born March 11, 1998) is an American freestyle and former folkstyle wrestler who competes at 61 kilograms. In freestyle, Fix is most notably a World Championship runner-up and U20 World champion, a Pan American Games gold medalist and a US National champion.

In folkstyle, Fix was a four-time NCAA Division I National runner-up, five-time NCAA All-American and a five-time Big 12 Conference champion for the Oklahoma State Cowboys.

== Folkstyle career ==
=== High school ===
Fix attended Charles Page High School in Oklahoma, where he was coached by his father Derek ('83 Cadet World Champion) and Kelly Smith. There, he went undefeated in his high school career, compiling 168 wins and no losses, and racking up four state titles. Nationally, he was a multiple-time folkstyle US national champion. He was named the Junior Hodge Trophy winner in 2017.

=== College ===
In November 2016, Fix, the number-one recruit in the country pound-for-pound, committed to John Smith from the Oklahoma State University, staying in his home state of Oklahoma.

==== 2017–2018 ====
As a redshirt athlete, Fix became the Reno Tournament champion, compiling notable victories over ninth-ranked Ronnie Bresser (who would go on to become an All-American later in the season) and eight-ranked Sean Fausz.

==== 2018–2019 ====
During the 2018 part of the season, Fix won titles from the Oklahoma City Open and the Reno Tournament, and also went 5–0 in dual meets, compiling notable victories over returning two-time All-American and '17 NCAA runner-up Ethan Lizak and returning All-American Montorie Bridges. To kick off 2019, Fix claimed the Southern Scuffle title and went on to win three more dual meets, where he defeated returning NCAA runner-up Nick Suriano in one of them, although very controversially. Fix's first collegiate loss came shortly after, by the hands of Micky Phillippi, in a close 1–3 decision loss. He bounced back with a win over the nationally ranked Austin Gomez and five more dual wins, including victories over third-ranked Austin DeSanto and John Erneste (both would become All-Americans in the post-season), to end regular season as the top-ranked 133-pounder in the United States.

In the post-season, Fix went 4–0 at the Big 12 Conference Championships to claim the title and enter the NCAA's as the top-seed. At the NCAA tournament, Fix downed four opponents to make the finals, including the fifth and eight seeds Luke Pletcher and John Erneste. In the final, he faced Nick Suriano in an anticipated rematch, where after a very close match, Fix claimed runner-up honors when he was defeated after Suriano claimed two points during the second sudden victory period. He closed out the season with 34 wins and two losses.

==== 2020–2021 ====
Fix did not compete in the NCAA in 2019–2020, as he took an Olympic redshirt to prepare for the US Olympic Team Trials. He was expected to compete for the Cowboys from the start of the season, however, his USADA suspension led him unable to, and became eligible on February 10, 2021, to return. Fix came back on February 14, winning one extra match by technical fall before pinning his way to the Cowboy Challenge title in three matches. In the final dual of the season, Fix claimed his fourth straight pin to roll into the post-season with an undefeated 5–0 record. At the Big 12 Conference Championships, Fix compiled four more wins to claim his second title, helping the Cowboys reach the team crown. At the NCAA's, Fix compiled three bonus points victories to make the semifinals, where he edged B1G runner-up and former All-American from Iowa Austin DeSanto to make his second final. In the finale he faced B1G champion and Penn State star Roman Bravo-Young, where after going into overtime, Fix was defeated the same way and by the same score as in his other finals match against Nick Suriano, once again claiming runner-up honors.

== Freestyle career ==
=== Age-group ===
As a cadet, Fix won two Cadet Pan American titles, in 2013 and 2014. That same year, he went on to place tenth at the Cadet World Championships and second at the Youth Summer Olympics. The following year (2015), he earned a bronze medal from the Cadet World Championships after making his second US World Team, and in 2016, Fix earned another bronze, now at the Junior World Championships. In 2017, Fix became a Junior World Champion, while sweeping all five opponents with a combined score of 53–1, with the lone point being surrendered at the finals, where he tech'd Russia's Ismail Gadzhiev 12–1. After making his fifth age-group US World Team, the returning World Champion was defeated in the semifinals, before coming back and earning his third World Championship bronze.

=== Senior level ===
==== 2016–2017 ====
Fix won his first two senior matches at the 2016 and 2017 Beat the Streets events, against '13 Cadet World Championship bronze medalist from Iran Heirollah Ghahremani (TF 14–3) and Joey Melendez (TF 14–1). In October, Fix, who at this point had never wrestled an official collegiate match, became the US U23 World Team Member, with three wins on the Challenge Tournament, and two straight over NCAA DI champion and two-time All-American Nathan Tomasello in the best-of-three. At the U23 World Championships, Fix was eliminated in the opening match to place nineteenth.

==== 2018 ====
To start off the year, the incoming Cowboy placed second at the US Open National Championships, losing to '14 NCAA champion Tony Ramos by criteria in the finals. He then went on to become a Final X contestant after dominantly winning the US World Team Trials Challenge Tournament. At Final X: Lincoln ('18), Fix dropped two straight matches to returning World Championship runner-up Thomas Gilman, losing his chance to make his first US World Team.

==== 2019 ====
After his college freshman season was over, the '19 NCAA DI National runner-up won his first US Open National title, with wins over '18 US U23 National Champion Vito Arujau (TF 18–8) in the quarterfinals, '17 NCAA champion Darian Cruz (2–0) and Thomas Gilman in a rematch (8–4). As the US National champion, Fix sat out during the US World Team Trials Challenge Tournament, and waited for the winner to battle at Final X: Lincoln ('19). Fix ended up facing his rival Thomas Gilman at Final X, and after a dominant 9–1 victory in the first match, Fix was forced to go through a third match when he was defeated 2–3 by Gilman. Fix was able to drop Gilman with a 6–3 decision to make his first US World Team.

Fix then won the Pan American Games gold medal, with a notable victory over the heavily accomplished Cuban Reineri Andreu. At the World Championships, Fix started off dominant by tech'ing '19 European Championship bronze medalist Vladimir Egorov, but was subsequently defeated by '17 World Champion Yuki Takahashi, in a closely contested 2–4 loss. In October, it was announced that Fix would be taking an Olympic Redshirt instead of participating in NCAA wrestling for 2019–20.

==== 2020 ====
After his run at the World Championships, Fix came back on January, at the Matteo Pellicone Ranking Series. After two wins, he was dropped twice, by his rival Thomas Gilman and Minghu Liu respectively, to place fifth.

Fix was then scheduled to compete at the '20 US Olympic Team Trials on April 4 at State College, Pennsylvania. However, the event was postponed for 2021 along with the Summer Olympics due to the COVID-19 pandemic, leaving all the qualifiers unable to compete.

On September, it was announced that Fix had been given a one-year long suspension by USADA, after failing a test for ostarine, which was retroactive to February 10, 2021, because his provisional suspension started on February 10, 2020. Fix claims that he ingested the substance when he drank from a contaminated water bottle, which his father Derek had prepared for himself and left in the refrigerator, before Daton drank it.

==== 2021 ====
After his suspension was lifted and the NCAA season ended, Fix competed at the rescheduled US Olympic Team Trials in April 2 as the second seed, in an attempt to represent the United States at the 2020 Summer Olympics. After beating Sean Russell, he was defeated by Vito Arujau in the semifinals and subsequently forfeited out of the tournament.

Fix then registered to come back at the 2021 US World Team Trials on September 11–12, intending to represent the country at the World Championships at 61 kilograms. He made the best-of-three after a successful first day, tech'ing youngster Carter Young and NCAA champion Seth Gross, and neutralizing 2020 Pan American Champion Tyler Graff to advance. Fix repeated his 2019 feat and became a two-time US World Team Member, now at 61 kilos, by putting a clinic on NCAA champion Nathan Tomasello twice in a row. As a result, he represented the United States at the 2021 World Championships from October 2 to 3 in Oslo, Norway.

Fix had an outstanding first day, racking up 41 points to none against four opponents, including Individual World Cup medalist Georgi Vangelov and European Champion Arsen Harutyunyan, driving them to flawless technical falls. In the finale, he wrestled reigning Individual World Cup and European champion Abasgadzhi Magomedov for the gold medal, where he was closely defeated on points, claiming the silver medal.

==== 2022 ====
Back from his stellar performance at the 2021 World Championships, Fix quickly dismantled World Championship competitor Giusseppe Rea from Colombia on February 12, at Bout at the Ballpark. A couple hours later, he downed fellow two-time All-American Austin DeSanto from Iowa in folkstyle, competing for the Cowboys. On May 8, he racked up the Pan American Championship.

== Freestyle record ==
Senior Freestyle Matches
Res.	Record	Opponent	Score	Date	Event	Location
2025 US Open DNP at 61 kg
Loss		(United States) Fernando Barreto	FF	April 25–26, 2025	2025 US Open National Championships	(United States) Las Vegas, Nevada
Loss	55-15	(United States) Ben Davino	INJ	April 25–26, 2025	2025 US Open National Championships	(United States) Las Vegas, Nevada
Win	55-14	(United States) Ethan Oakley	TF 10-0	April 25–26, 2025	2025 US Open National Championships	(United States) Las Vegas, Nevada
Win	54-14	(United States) Bennie Fielding	TF 10-0	April 25–26, 2025	2025 US Open National Championships	(United States) Las Vegas, Nevada
2025 Dan Kolov & Nikola Petrov (gold) at 61 kg
Win	53–14	(United States) Devan Turner	3-0	January 23–26, 2025	2025 Dan Kolov & Nikola Petrov Tournament	Sofia, Bulgaria
Win	52-14	(Romania) Razvan Kovacs	TF 10–0	January 23–26, 2025	2025 Dan Kolov & Nikola Petrov Tournament	Sofia, Bulgaria
Win	51-14	(Ukraine) Yaroslac Hurskyy	TF 10–0	January 23–26, 2025	2025 Dan Kolov & Nikola Petrov Tournament	Sofia, Bulgaria
2024 US World Team Trials (bronze) at 61 kg
Loss	50-14	(United States) Marcus Blaze	2-3	September 14–15, 2024	2024 US World Team Trials	(United States) Omaha, Nebraska
Win	49-13	(United States) Austin DeSanto	6-0	September 14–15, 2024	2024 US World Team Trials	(United States) Omaha, Nebraska
Win	48-13	(United States) Nasir Bailey	TF 10-0	September 14–15, 2024	2024 US World Team Trials	(United States) Omaha, Nebraska
2023 Poland Open (gold) at 61 kg
Win	48-13	(United States) Austin DeSanto	6-3	July 26-30, 2023	2023 Poland Open	Warsaw, Poland
Win	47-13	(Bulgaria) Georgi Vangelov	5-1	July 26-30, 2023	2023 Poland Open	Warsaw, Poland
Win	46-13	(Georgia (country)) Ramaz Turmanidze	TF 10-0	July 26-30, 2023	2023 Poland Open	Warsaw, Poland
2023 Final X (bronze) at 61 kg
Win	45-13	(United States) Austin DeSanto	9-0	June 10, 2023	2023 Final X: Newark	(United States) Newark, New Jersey
2023 US World Team Trials (silver) at 61 kg
Loss	44-13	(United States) Nahshon Garrett	4-12	May 20-21, 2023	2023 World Team Trials	(United States) Colorado Springs, Colorado
Win	44-12	(United States) Seth Gross	8-2	May 20-21, 2023	2023 World Team Trials	(United States) Colorado Springs, Colorado
Win	43-12	(United States) Joe Colon	3-0	May 20-21, 2023	2023 World Team Trials	(United States) Colorado Springs, Colorado
2022 US World Team Trials (silver) at 61 kg
Loss	42–12	(United States) Seth Gross	5–9	June 3, 2022	2022 Final X: Stillwater	(United States) Stillwater, Oklahoma
Loss	42–11	(United States) Seth Gross	4–5	June 3, 2022	2022 Final X: Stillwater	(United States) Stillwater, Oklahoma
Win	42–10	(United States) Seth Gross	5–5	June 3, 2022	2022 Final X: Stillwater	(United States) Stillwater, Oklahoma
2022 Pan American Championships (gold) at 61 kg
Win	41–10	(Canada) Logan Sloan	Fall	May 8, 2022	2022 Pan American Continental Championships	Acapulco, Mexico
Win	40–10	(Mexico) Pedro Flores	TF 10–0	May 8, 2022	2022 Pan American Continental Championships	Acapulco, Mexico
Win	39–10	(Puerto Rico) Joe Silva	TF 11–0	May 8, 2022	2022 Pan American Continental Championships	Acapulco, Mexico
Win	38–10	(Ecuador) Giusseppe Rea	TF 10–0	February 12, 2022	2022 Bout at the Ballpark	(United States) Arlington, Texas
2021 World Championships (silver) at 61 kg
Loss	37–10	(Russia) Abasgadzhi Magomedov	1–4	October 3, 2021	2021 World Championships	Oslo, Norway
Win	37–9	(Armenia) Arsen Harutyunyan	TF 10–0	October 2, 2021	2021 World Championships	Oslo, Norway
Win	36–9	(India) Ravinder Dahiya	TF 10–0	October 2, 2021	2021 World Championships	Oslo, Norway
Win	35–9	(France) Arman Eloyan	TF 10–0	October 2, 2021	2021 World Championships	Oslo, Norway
Win	34–9	(Bulgaria) Georgi Vangelov	TF 11–0	October 2, 2021	2021 World Championships	Oslo, Norway
2021 US World Team Trials (gold) at 61 kg
Win	33–9	(United States) Nathan Tomasello	7–0	September 12, 2021	2021 US World Team Trials	(United States) Lincoln, Nebraska
Win	32–9	(United States) Nathan Tomasello	8–3	September 12, 2021	2021 US World Team Trials	(United States) Lincoln, Nebraska
Win	31–9	(United States) Tyler Graff	2–0	September 11, 2021	2021 US World Team Trials	(United States) Lincoln, Nebraska
Win	30–9	(United States) Seth Gross	TF 11–0	September 11, 2021	2021 US World Team Trials	(United States) Lincoln, Nebraska
Win	29–9	(United States) Carter Young	TF 13–2	September 11, 2021	2021 US World Team Trials	(United States) Lincoln, Nebraska
2020 US Olympic Team Trials DNP at 57 kg
Loss	28–9	(United States) Vito Arujau	5–7	April 2–3, 2021	2020 US Olympic Team Trials	(United States) Fort Worth, Texas
Win	28–8	(United States) Sean Russell	TF 11–0	April 2–3, 2021	2020 US Olympic Team Trials	(United States) Fort Worth, Texas
2020 Matteo Pellicone Ranking Series 5th at 57 kg
Loss	27–8	(China) Minghu Liu	2–3	January 16, 2020	Matteo Pellicone Ranking Series 2020	Rome, Italy
Loss	27–7	(United States) Thomas Gilman	1–2	January 16, 2020	Matteo Pellicone Ranking Series 2020	Rome, Italy
Win	27–6	(Venezuela) Pedro Mejías	TF 11–0	January 16, 2020	Matteo Pellicone Ranking Series 2020	Rome, Italy
Win	26–6	(China) Wanhao Zou	7–1	January 16, 2020	Matteo Pellicone Ranking Series 2020	Rome, Italy
2019 World Championships 12th at 57 kg
Loss	25–6	(Japan) Yuki Takahashi	2–4	September 19, 2019	2019 World Championships	Nur-Sultan, Kazakhstan
Win	25–5	(North Macedonia) Vladimir Egorov	TF 12–1	September 19, 2019	2019 World Championships	Nur-Sultan, Kazakhstan
2019 Pan American Games (gold) at 57 kg
Win	24–5	(Dominican Republic) Juan Rubelín Ramírez	6–3	August 9, 2019	2019 Pan American Games	Lima, Peru
Win	23–5	(Cuba) Reineri Andreu	4–1	August 9, 2019	2019 Pan American Games	Lima, Peru
Win	22–5	(Venezuela) Pedro Mejías	TF 10–0	August 9, 2019	2019 Pan American Games	Lima, Peru
2019 US World Team Trials (gold) at 57 kg
Win	21–5	(United States) Thomas Gilman	6–3	June 14–15, 2019	2019 Final X: Lincoln	(United States) Lincoln, Nebraska
Loss	20–5	(United States) Thomas Gilman	2–3	June 14–15, 2019	2019 Final X: Lincoln	(United States) Lincoln, Nebraska
Win	20–4	(United States) Thomas Gilman	9–1	June 14–15, 2019	2019 Final X: Lincoln	(United States) Lincoln, Nebraska
2019 US Open (gold) at 57 kg
Win	19–4	(United States) Thomas Gilman	8–4	April 24–27, 2019	2019 US Open National Championships	(United States) Las Vegas, Nevada
Win	18–4	(United States) Darian Cruz	2–0	April 24–27, 2019	2019 US Open National Championships	(United States) Las Vegas, Nevada
Win	17–4	(United States) Vitali Arujau	TF 18–8	April 24–27, 2019	2019 US Open National Championships	(United States) Las Vegas, Nevada
Win	16–4	(United States) Graham Shore	8–0	April 24–27, 2019	2019 US Open National Championships	(United States) Las Vegas, Nevada
Win	15–4	(United States) James Hicks	TF 10–0	April 24–27, 2019	2019 US Open National Championships	(United States) Las Vegas, Nevada
Win	14–4	(United States) Ian Timmins	TF 12–1	April 24–27, 2019	2019 US Open National Championships	(United States) Las Vegas, Nevada
2018 US World Team Trials (silver) at 57 kg
Loss	13–4	(United States) Thomas Gilman	1–2	June 9–10, 2018	2018 Final X: Lincoln	(United States) Lincoln, Nebraska
Loss	13–3	(United States) Thomas Gilman	3–6	June 9–10, 2018	2018 Final X: Lincoln	(United States) Lincoln, Nebraska
Win	13–2	(United States) Zach Sanders	TF 10–0	June 9–10, 2018	2018 US World Team Trials Challenge Tournament	(United States) Lincoln, Nebraska
Win	12–2	(United States) Zane Richards	9–2	June 9–10, 2018	2018 US World Team Trials Challenge Tournament	(United States) Lincoln, Nebraska
Win	11–2	(United States) Eddie Klimara	TF 14–2	June 9–10, 2018	2018 US World Team Trials Challenge Tournament	(United States) Lincoln, Nebraska
2018 US Open (silver) at 57 kg
Loss	10–2	(United States) Tony Ramos	2–2	April 24–28, 2018	2018 US Open National Championships	(United States) Las Vegas, Nevada
Win	10–1	(United States) David Terao	TF 10–0	April 24–28, 2018	2018 US Open National Championships	(United States) Las Vegas, Nevada
Win	9–1	(United States) Daniel Deshazer	4–0	April 24–28, 2018	2018 US Open National Championships	(United States) Las Vegas, Nevada
Win	8–1	(United States) Britain Longmire	TF 10–0	April 24–28, 2018	2018 US Open National Championships	(United States) Las Vegas, Nevada
2017 U23 World Championships 19th at 57 kg
Loss	7–1	(Azerbaijan) Parviz Ibrahimov	2–5	November 21–26, 2017	2017 U23 World Championships	Bydgoszcz, Poland
2017 US U23 World Team Trials (gold) at 57 kg
Win	7–0	(United States) Nathan Tomasello	7–4	October 7–8, 2017	2017 US U23 World Team Trials	(United States) Rochester, Minnesota
Win	6–0	(United States) Nathan Tomasello	8–7	October 7–8, 2017	2017 US U23 World Team Trials	(United States) Rochester, Minnesota
Win	5–0	(United States) Josh Rodriguez	8–3	October 7–8, 2017	2017 US U23 World Team Trials Challenge Tournament	(United States) Rochester, Minnesota
Win	4–0	(United States) Liam Cronin	TF 10–0	October 7–8, 2017	2017 US U23 World Team Trials Challenge Tournament	(United States) Rochester, Minnesota
Win	3–0	(United States) Alexander Mackall	TF 10–0	October 7–8, 2017	2017 US U23 World Team Trials Challenge Tournament	(United States) Rochester, Minnesota
Win	2–0	(United States) Joey Melendez	TF 14–1	May 17, 2017	2017 Beat The Streets: Times Square	(United States) New York City, New York
Win	1–0	(Iran) Kheyrolla Ghahramani	TF 14–3	May 19, 2016	2016 Beat The Streets: United in the Square	(United States) New York City, New York

== NCAA record ==
=== Stats ===
Season	Year	School	NCAA	Weight Class	Record	Win
2024	Senior+	Oklahoma State University	2nd	133	21–1	95.45%
2023	Senior	Oklahoma State University	4th	133	30–2	93.75%
2022	Junior	Oklahoma State University	2nd	133	25–1	96.15%
2021	Sophomore	Oklahoma State University	2nd	133	13–1	92.86%
2020	Olympic RS	Oklahoma State University		133		
2019	Freshman	Oklahoma State University	2nd	133	34–2	94.44%
2018	Redshirt	Oklahoma State University		125	5–0	100.00%
Career					128–7	94.81%
