= RAF 02 =

2025 wrestling event

RAF 02: Dake vs. Makoev
- The poster for RAF 02: Dake vs. Makoev
- Promotion: Real American Freestyle
- Date: October 25, 2025
- Venue: Bryce Jordan Center
- City: State College, Pennsylvania
- Attendance: 3,000

Event chronology
RAF 01: Hendrickson vs. Elders	RAF 02: Dake vs. Makoev	RAF 03: Mendes vs. Chandler

RAF 02: Dake vs. Makoev was a freestyle wrestling event that took place on October 25, 2025 at the Bryce Jordan Center of Pennsylvania State University in State College, Pennsylvania.

It was the second flagship event produced by the Real American Freestyle (RAF) promotion, and aired live on Fox Nation.

== Background ==
Tickets for the event went on sale through Ticketmaster on September 18, 2025. The event was rescheduled from its original date of November 8, 2025, as that would have conflicted with a Penn State Nittany Lions football home game.

Commentary for the event's live Fox Nation broadcast was provided by Kurt Angle, Bubba Jenkins, Bo Nickal, and Julianna Peña.

Kyle Snyder suffered a knee injury prior to the event, and was replaced by Alexander Romanov.

Roman Bravo-Young suffered an injury prior to the event, and was replaced by Matt Ramos.

Andriy Yatsenko was replaced by Austin DeSanto.

== Results ==
Main card (Fox Nation)
Weight class				Method	Round	Time	Notes
Cruiserweight	(United States) Kyle Dake (c)	def.	(Slovakia) Boris Makoev	Decision (7–1)	3	2:00	(Note: For the RAF Cruiserweight Championship.)
Women's Flyweight	(United States) Helen Maroulis	def.	(Canada) Samantha Stewart	Decision (6–0)	3	2:00	(Note: For the inaugural RAF Women's Flyweight Championship.)
Bantamweight	(United States) Nathan Tomasello (c)	def.	(United States) Matt Ramos	Decision (5–3)	3	2:00	(Note: For the RAF Bantamweight Championship.)
Welterweight	(United States) David Carr	def.	(Egypt) Amr Reda Hussen	Technical fall (18–6)	2	1:44	(Note: For the inaugural RAF Welterweight Championship.)
Heavyweight	(United States) Jake Varner	def.	(United States) Pat Downey	Decision (5–1)	3	2:00
Cruiserweight	(United States) Nate Jackson	def.	(United States) Carter Starocci	Decision (7–2)	3	2:00
Openweight	(United States) Cayden Henschel	def.	(United States) Keelon Jimison	Technical fall (11–1)	3	1:29
Heavyweight	(United States) Mason Parris	def.	(Moldova) Alexander Romanov	Technical fall (11–0)	2	1:51
Welterweight	(Slovakia) Tajmuraz Salkazanov	def.	(United States) James Green	Decision (criteria) (4–4)	3	2:00
Bantamweight	(United States) Austin DeSanto	def.	(United States) Nico Megaludis	Technical fall (10–0)	3	1:17

== Bonus awards ==
The following athletes received bonuses.

- Match of the Night: Nate Jackson vs. Carter Starocci

== See also ==
- List of RAF events
