= Nick Suriano =

American wrestler (born 1997)

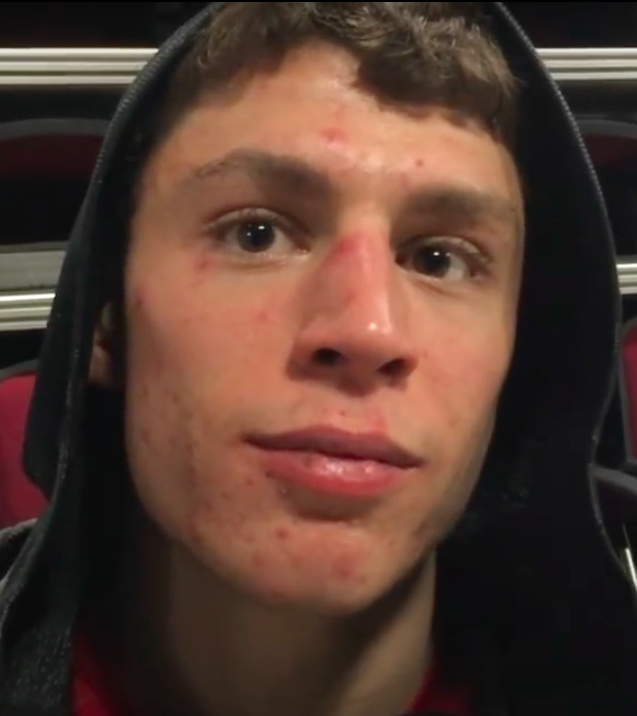
- Suriano after the 2018 NCAA championships

Personal information
- Full name: Nicholas Raymond Suriano
- Born: April 14, 1997 (age 29) Paramus, New Jersey, U.S.
- Height: 5 ft 6 in (168 cm)

Sport
- Country: United States
- Sport: Wrestling
- Weight class: 125 lb (57 kg)
- Events: Freestyle and Folkstyle
- College team: Michigan; Rutgers
- Club: NYCRTC; NJRTC
- Coached by: Sean Bormet
Medal record
Men's freestyle wrestling
Representing the United States
Pan American Championships
Gold medal – first place	2024 Acapulco	61 kg
Grand Prix de France Henri Deglane
Gold medal – first place	2021 Nice	57 kg
Gold medal – first place	2023 Nice	57 kg
Matteo Pellicone Ranking Series
Silver medal – second place	2021 Rome	57 kg
Men's collegiate wrestling
Representing the Michigan Wolverines
NCAA Division I Championships
Gold medal – first place	2022 Detroit	125 lb
Big Ten Championships
Gold medal – first place	2022 Lincoln	125 lb
Representing the Rutgers Scarlet Knights
NCAA Division I Championships
Gold medal – first place	2019 Pittsburgh	133 lb
Silver medal – second place	2018 Cleveland	125 lb
Big Ten Championships
Gold medal – first place	2019 Minneapolis	133 lb

Nicholas Raymond Suriano (born April 14, 1997) is an American freestyle and folkstyle wrestler who competes at 57 kilograms. In freestyle, he claimed the 2021 Henri Deglane Grand Prix gold medal and the 2021 Matteo Pellicone Ranking Series silver medal. As a folkstyle wrestler, Suriano was the 2022 NCAA Division I national and Big Ten Conference champion at 125 pounds for the Michigan Wolverines, repeating what he accomplished in 2019 at 133 pounds at Rutgers University, where he also was an NCAA finalist in 2018. Suriano is also the creator of "Handsome Tuesday", a weekly posting encouraging confidence and reminding everyone they are indeed Handsome, and deserve to have themselves a "Handsome Tuesday".

== Wrestling career ==
=== High school ===
Suriano was born and raised in New Jersey, where he played football as a defensive back in his youth and was introduced to wrestling by his father at age seven. At age 12, he quit football to focus on wrestling. Suriano then attended Bergen Catholic High School and became one of the most accomplished wrestlers in the history of his home state; accumulating eight NJSIAA state titles overall, four individual and four team championships, the first New Jersey wrestler to do so. Suriano was undefeated with a record of 159–0 and also picked up runner-up honors to eventual rival Daton Fix at the 2014 US Cadet Nationals in freestyle.

=== College years ===
In high school, Suriano committed to Pennsylvania State University to wrestle as a Nittany Lion for Cael Sanderson.

==== 2016–2017 ====
As a freshman, Suriano compiled 16 victories and three defeats (two losses were by injury default), with notable wins over the season's NCAA champion and finalist Darian Cruz and Ethan Lizak, the season's B1G runner–up Tim Lambert and eventual NCAA DII National champion Jose Rodriguez. He was the third seed at the NCAAs; however, he suffered a broken ankle in a match against Nick Piccininni and was unable to compete at the Big Ten Conference championships or the NCAA championships.

==== 2017–2018 ====
After his injury, Suriano transferred to Rutgers University to wrestle as a Scarlet Knight beginning his sophomore year. He had a highly successful first year at Rutgers, with 25 wins and one loss, compiling notable victories over eventual three-time All-American Sebastian Rivera (twice) and eventual two-timers Ronnie Bresser and Zeke Moisey. At the Big Ten Championships, he won his first bout; however, he was forced to medical forfeit his next matches and was eliminated. Entering the NCAAs undefeated, he made his way to the finals by defeating four opponents, including the defending champion Darian Cruz and two other seeded wrestlers. At the finals, he fell to Iowa's Spencer Lee, thus finishing as national runner-up.

==== 2018–2019 ====
In his junior season, he moved up a weight class from 125 to 133 pounds. He ended the year with a 26–3 record and notable victories in regular-season over defending MAC champion John Erneste (eventual two–time MAC champion and All-American) and eventual ACC champion Micky Phillippi. At the Big Ten Conference championships, he defeated four opponents, including future two–time All–Americans Luke Pletcher and Austin DeSanto and future three-timer Ethan Lizak to win his weight class. At the NCAA championships, he made the final after beating three opponents including Stevan Mićić and Ethan Lizak. In the final, he faced Daton Fix, whom he defeated in the second sudden victory period to become the champion at 133 pounds, the first-ever national champion at Rutgers (his teammate Anthony Ashnault would become the second later in the tournament).

==== 2019–2020 ====
Suriano upset '19 Pan American champion and '18 world medalist Joe Colon at the annual Beat the Streets event on May 6 in a freestyle match. In September, Suriano announced he had taken an Olympic redshirt for the season to pursue freestyle aspirations.

At the prestigious Bill Farrell Memorial in November, Suriano dropped to 57 kilograms and won by tech over former DI All-American and two-time Big 12 champion from Oklahoma State Eddie Klimara and Canadian Dragos Robertson in his first two matches, before losing to fellow NCAA champion from Wisconsin Seth Gross. In the consolation bracket, he defeated former four-time DI All-American and '12 graduate from Minnesota Zach Sanders, '16 US University National champion and two-time D-I All-American Zane Richards (technical fall), and two-time US Open national runner-up and '16 NCAA champion Nahshon Garrett to place third.

Suriano competed at the US Nationals in late December, where he defeated future Pan American champion Shelton Mack and '13 NCAA All-American Britain Longmire in his first two matches, before losing a close match against 2019 Junior World finalist and D-I All-American from Cornell Vito Arujau. In the consolation bracket, he once again defeated Zane Richards and added fellow NCAA champion Darian Cruz to the list by technical fall before forfeiting the third-place match against Arujau, to place fourth and qualify for the 2020 US Olympic Team Trials.

==== 2021 ====
Suriano was scheduled to wrestle at the 2020 US Olympic Team Trials on April 4–5. However, the event was postponed along with the 2020 Summer Olympics due to the COVID-19 pandemic. Both competitions were rescheduled to take place in 2021.

After more than a year of inactiveness in any ruleset and social spectrum, Suriano competed at the Henri Deglane Grand Prix of France on January 16, in his first international tournament overseas. In the quarterfinals, he dominantly shut down '19 European Games and '15 Junior World Champion from Azerbaijan Mahir Amiraslanov, with seven unanswered points. Next, he took out '13 Junior World Championship bronze medalist from Georgia Beja Bujiashvili, four points to one to make the finals, where he outmatched Islam Bazarganov from Azerbaijan, seven points to one, to claim the championship.

Suriano then wrestled at the prestigious Matteo Pellicone Ranking Series on March 7. In the first round, he was edged by '18 World Championship runner-up Nurislam Sanayev, as Sanayev received two points off Suriano grabbing fingers and a point off passiveness, against a two-point takedown from Suriano. In his next three matches, he got an injury default from Daulet Temirzhanov and decisions from three–time Junior World Champion Ahmet Peker and '19 Yasar Dogu International champion Givi Davidovi. In the gold-medal match, he got a rematch against Sanayev, whom he once again lost to, claiming the silver medal.

Suriano was then slated to compete at the rescheduled US Olympic Team Trials in April 2–3 as the fifth seed, in an attempt to represent the United States at the 2020 Summer Olympics. However, it was officially announced in the day of the event, that Suriano had been forced to withdraw from the event due to a COVID-19 positive test. Suriano was considered by many as one of the favorites to claim the Olympic spot despite his seed. He was then registered to come back to competition on June 8, at the prestigious Poland Open. However, it was announced hours before his scheduled appearance that Suriano had withdrawn from the event for unknown reasons.

On July 21, it was announced that Suriano had officially finished his career at Rutgers University and entered the transfer portal.

Instead, he registered to come back at the 2021 US World Team Trials from September 11 to 12, intending to represent the country at the World Championships at 61 kilograms. After making the quarterfinals, Suriano was upset by 2015 NCAA champion Nathan Tomasello on points, dropping his chances of a World Team spot. He beat 2021 Pan American Champion Shelton Mack in the consolation bracket, but chose to forfeit his next match the next day.

==== 2022 ====
On November 28, 2021, it was revealed that Suriano had transferred to the University of Michigan and would compete at 125 pounds for the Michigan Wolverines in his return to college wrestling. Suriano went 8–0 during regular season before claiming his third Big Ten Conference championship. The top-seed, he went straight to the finals despite facing and beating returning NCAA finalist Brandon Courtney and returning All-American Sam Latona. Suriano won his second National title by beating fellow New Jersey native Pat Glory, capping off his college career.

==== 2024 ====
Suriano won the gold medal in the men's 61 kg event at the 2024 Pan American Wrestling Championships held in Acapulco, Mexico.

== Freestyle record ==
Senior Freestyle Matches
Res.	Record	Opponent	Score	Date	Event	Location
2024 US Olympic Team Trials DNP at 57 kg
Loss		(United States) Jax Forrest	FF	April 19, 2024	2024 US Olympic Team Trials	(United States) State College, Pennsylvania
Loss	31–9	(United States) Daton Fix	1–5	April 19, 2024	2024 US Olympic Team Trials	(United States) State College, Pennsylvania
Win	31–8	(United States) Marcus Blaze	4–2	April 19, 2024	2024 US Olympic Team Trials	(United States) State College, Pennsylvania
2024 Pan American Championships (gold) at 61 kg
Win	30–8	(Mexico) Carlos Lavat Cortes	Fall	February 23, 2024	2024 Pan American Continental Championships	Acapulco, Mexico
Win		(Guatemala) Edwin Segura	FF	February 23, 2024	2024 Pan American Continental Championships	Acapulco, Mexico
Win	29–8	(Peru) Jose Benites Vasquez	TF 12–2	February 23, 2024	2024 Pan American Continental Championships	Acapulco, Mexico
Win	28–8	(Puerto Rico) Joe Silva	3–2	February 23, 2024	2024 Pan American Continental Championships	Acapulco, Mexico
2023 US Open (silver) at 57 kg
Loss	27–8	(United States) Zane Richards	3–3	April 27–28, 2023	2023 US Open National Championships	(United States) Las Vegas, Nevada
Win		(United States) Spencer Lee	FF	April 27–28, 2023	2023 US Open National Championships	(United States) Las Vegas, Nevada
Win	27–7	(United States) Cooper Flynn	7–1	April 27–28, 2023	2023 US Open National Championships	(United States) Las Vegas, Nevada
Win	26–7	(United States) Austin Assad	5–0	April 27–28, 2023	2023 US Open National Championships	(United States) Las Vegas, Nevada
Win	25–7	(United States) Jakob Lyons	Fall	April 27–28, 2023	2023 US Open National Championships	(United States) Las Vegas, Nevada
2023 Ibrahim Moustafa 5th at 57 kg
Loss	24–7	(Kazakhstan) Rakhat Kalzhan	1–2	February 23–26, 2023	2023 Ibrahim Moustafa	Alexandria, Egypt
Loss	24–6	(Turkey) Süleyman Atlı	3–9	February 23–26, 2023	2023 Ibrahim Moustafa	Alexandria, Egypt
Win	24–5	(Georgia (country)) Beka Bujiashvili	2–1	February 23–26, 2023	2023 Ibrahim Moustafa	Alexandria, Egypt
Win	23–5	(China) Liu Minghu	2–1	February 23–26, 2023	2023 Ibrahim Moustafa	Alexandria, Egypt
Win	22–5	(Uzbekistan) Nodirjon Safarov	10–4	February 23–26, 2023	2023 Ibrahim Moustafa	Alexandria, Egypt
2023 Henri Deglane Grand Prix (gold) at 57 kg
Win	21–5	(Guinea-Bissau) Diamantino Iuna Fafé	TF 10–0	January 20–22, 2023	Grand Prix de France Henri Deglane 2023	Nice, France
Win	20–5	(Georgia (country)) Giorgi Gegelashvili	8–2	January 20–22, 2023	Grand Prix de France Henri Deglane 2023	Nice, France
Win	19–5	(France) Valentin Dâmour	9–0	January 20–22, 2023	Grand Prix de France Henri Deglane 2023	Nice, France
2022 World Cup (gold) at 57 kg as Team USA
Win	18–5	(Georgia (country)) Beka Bujiashvili	6–3	December 10–11, 2022	2022 World Cup	(United States) Coralville, Iowa
2021 US World Team Trials DNP at 61 kg
Loss		(United States) Carter Young	FF	September 12, 2021	2021 US World Team Trials	(United States) Lincoln, Nebraska
Win	17–5	(United States) Shelton Mack	3–1	September 11, 2021	2021 US World Team Trials	(United States) Lincoln, Nebraska
Loss	16–5	(United States) Nathan Tomasello	0–3	September 11, 2021	2021 US World Team Trials	(United States) Lincoln, Nebraska
Win	16–4	(United States) Sean Fausz	10–2	September 11, 2021	2021 US World Team Trials	(United States) Lincoln, Nebraska
2021 Matteo Pellicone Ranking Series (silver) at 57 kg
Loss	15–4	(Kazakhstan) Nurislam Sanayev	2–4	March 7, 2021	Matteo Pellicone Ranking Series 2021	Rome, Italy
Win	15–3	(Italy) Givi Davidovi	3–2	March 7, 2021	Matteo Pellicone Ranking Series 2021	Rome, Italy
Win	14–3	(Turkey) Ahmet Peker	4–2	March 7, 2021	Matteo Pellicone Ranking Series 2021	Rome, Italy
Win		(Kazakhstan) Daulet Temirzhanov	INJ	March 7, 2021	Matteo Pellicone Ranking Series 2021	Rome, Italy
Loss	13–3	(Kazakhstan) Nurislam Sanayev	2–3	March 7, 2021	Matteo Pellicone Ranking Series 2021	Rome, Italy
2021 Henri Deglane Grand Prix (gold) at 57 kg
Win	13–2	(Azerbaijan) Islam Bazarganov	7–1	January 16, 2021	Grand Prix de France Henri Deglane 2021	Nice, France
Win	12–2	(Georgia (country)) Beka Bujiashvili	4–1	January 16, 2021	Grand Prix de France Henri Deglane 2021	Nice, France
Win	11–2	(Azerbaijan) Mahir Amiraslanov	7–0	January 16, 2021	Grand Prix de France Henri Deglane 2021	Nice, France
2019 US Nationals 4th at 57 kg
Loss		(United States) Vitali Arujau	FF	December 21–22, 2019	2019 US Nationals - US Olympic Trials Qualifier	(United States) Fort Worth, Texas
Win	10–2	(United States) Darian Cruz	TF 10–0	December 21–22, 2019	2019 US Nationals - US Olympic Trials Qualifier	(United States) Fort Worth, Texas
Win	9–2	(United States) Zane Richards	TF 12–0	December 21–22, 2019	2019 US Nationals - US Olympic Trials Qualifier	(United States) Fort Worth, Texas
Loss	8–2	(United States) Vitali Arujau	2–2	December 21–22, 2019	2019 US Nationals - US Olympic Trials Qualifier	(United States) Fort Worth, Texas
Win	8–1	(United States) Britain Longmire	TF 10–0	December 21–22, 2019	2019 US Nationals - US Olympic Trials Qualifier	(United States) Fort Worth, Texas
Win	7–1	(United States) Shelton Mack	4–1	December 21–22, 2019	2019 US Nationals - US Olympic Trials Qualifier	(United States) Fort Worth, Texas
2019 Bill Farrell M. International (bronze) at 57 kg
Win	6–1	(United States) Nahshon Garrett	8–1	November 15–16, 2019	2019 Bill Farrell Memorial International Open	(United States) New York City, New York
Win	5–1	(United States) Zane Richards	TF 10–0	November 15–16, 2019	2019 Bill Farrell Memorial International Open	(United States) New York City, New York
Win	4–1	(United States) Zach Sanders	6–2	November 15–16, 2019	2019 Bill Farrell Memorial International Open	(United States) New York City, New York
Loss	3–1	(United States) Seth Gross	2–4	November 15–16, 2019	2019 Bill Farrell Memorial International Open	(United States) New York City, New York
Win	3–0	(Canada) Dragos Robertson	TF 10–0	November 15–16, 2019	2019 Bill Farrell Memorial International Open	(United States) New York City, New York
Win	2–0	(United States) Eddie Klimara	TF 11–0	November 15–16, 2019	2019 Bill Farrell Memorial International Open	(United States) New York City, New York
Win	1–0	(United States) Joe Colon	3–1	May 6, 2019	2019 Beat The Streets: Grapple at the Garden	(United States) New York City, New York

== NCAA record ==
NCAA Division I Record
Res.	Record	Opponent	Score	Date	Event
2022 NCAA Championships (gold) at 125 lbs
Win	85–7	Pat Glory	5-3	March 19, 2022	2022 NCAA Division I National Championships
Win	84–7	Brandon Courtney	4-1	March 18, 2022	2022 NCAA Division I National Championships
Win	83–7	Sam Latona	Fall	March 18, 2022	2022 NCAA Division I National Championships
Win	82–7	Anthony Noto	8-3	March 17, 2022	2022 NCAA Division I National Championships
Win	81–7	Logan Ashton	MD 16-3	March 17, 2022	2022 NCAA Division I National Championships
2022 Big Ten Conference (gold) at 125 lbs
Win	80–7	Eric Barnett	MD 12-4	March 6, 2022	2022 Big Ten Conference Championships
Win	79–7	Devin Schroeder	Fall	March 5, 2022	2022 Big Ten Conference Championships
Win	78–7	Dylan Shawver	MD 18-6	March 5, 2022	2022 Big Ten Conference Championships
Win	77–7	Tristan Lujan	MD 14–3	February 13, 2022	Michigan State - Michigan Dual
Win	77–7	Jacob Moran	Fall	February 11, 2022	Michigan - Indiana Dual
Win	76–7	Patrick McKee	MD 14–6	January 23, 2022	Minnesota - Michigan Dual
Win	75–7	Dylan Shawver	TF 16–1	January 28, 2022	Rutgers - Michigan Dual
Win	74–7	Drew Hildebrandt	2–1	January 21, 2022	Penn State - Michigan Dual
Win	73–7	Malik Heinselman	MD 11–3	January 14, 2022	Michigan - Ohio State Dual
Win	72–7	Jake Staud	TF 19–2	January 9, 2022	Army Michigan ECM
Win	71–7	Gage Curry	MD 18–7	January 9, 2022	Michigan - Pittsburgh Dual
Start of 2021–2022 Season (senior year)
End of 2018–2019 Season (junior year)
2019 NCAA Championships (gold) at 133 lbs
Win	70–7	Daton Fix	SV 4-2	March 21, 2019	2019 NCAA Division I National Championships
Win	69–7	Stevan Mićić	4-1	March 21, 2019	2019 NCAA Division I National Championships
Win	68–7	Ethan Lizak	Fall	March 21, 2019	2019 NCAA Division I National Championships
Win	67–7	Korbin Myers	7-2	March 21, 2019	2019 NCAA Division I National Championships
Win	66–7	Dylan Duncan	MD 12-3	March 21, 2019	2019 NCAA Division I National Championships
2019 Big Ten Conference (gold) at 133 lbs
Win	65–7	Luke Pletcher	4-1	March 9, 2019	2019 Big Ten Conference Championships
Win	64–7	Austin DeSanto	6-3	March 9, 2019	2019 Big Ten Conference Championships
Win	63–7	Ethan Lizak	9-2	March 9, 2019	2019 Big Ten Conference Championships
Win	62–7	Orion Anderson	Fall	March 9, 2019	2019 Big Ten Conference Championships
Win	61–7	Orion Anderson	Fall	February 22, 2019	Rutgers - Maryland Dual
Loss	60–7	Stevan Mićić	2-3	February 17, 2019	Michigan - Rutgers Dual
Win	60–6	Ben Thornton	MD 12-4	February 10, 2019	Rutgers - Purdue Dual
Win	59–6	Garret Pepple	MD 20-7	Feb 8, 2019	Rutgers- Indiana Dual
Win	58–6	Jonathan Gomez	TF 25-9	Feb 3, 2019	Princeton - Rutgers Dual
Win	57–6	Jevon Parrish	MD 12-2	Feb 1, 2019	Nebraska - Rutgers Dual
Win	56–6	Logan Griffin	TF 22-4	January 25, 2019	Michigan State - Rutgers Dual
Loss	55–6	Austin DeSanto	4-6	Jan 18, 2019	Rutgers - Iowa Dual
Loss	55–5	Daton Fix	TB-2 2-3	Jan 13, 2019	Oklahoma State - Rutgers Dual
Win	55–4	Jens Lantz	MD 14-5	January 11, 2019	Wisconsin - Rutgers Dual
Win	54–4	Skyler Petry	TF 20-5	January 6, 2019	Rutgers - Minnesota Dual
Win	53–4	Anthony Cefolo	MD 15-3	December 16, 2019	Rider - Rutgers Dual
2018 Cliff Keen Invitational (gold) at 133 lbs
Win	52–4	Mitch Brown	MD 22-8	November 30, 2018	2018 Cliff Keen Invitational
Win	51–4	Korbin Myers	7-2	November 30, 2018	2018 Cliff Keen Invitational
Win	50–4	Micky Phillippi	MD 11-3	November 30, 2018	2018 Cliff Keen Invitational
Win	49–4	John Erneste	3-2	November 30, 2018	2018 Cliff Keen Invitational
Win	48–4	Seth Koleno	TF 21-6	November 30, 2018	2018 Cliff Keen Invitational
Win	47–4	Trent Olson	Fall	November 16, 2018	Rutgers - Hofstra Dual
Win	46–4	Mitch Brown	MD 14-2	November 10, 2018	Utah Valley - Rutgers Dual
Win	45–4	forfeit	MFOR	November 10, 2018	Rutgers - Appalachian State Dual
Win	44–4	Christopher Caban	Fall	November 3, 2018	Johnson & Wales (RI) - Rutgers Dual
Win	43–4	Bobby Demeter	Fall	November 3, 2018	Centenary (NJ) - Rutgers Dual
Win	42–4	Gary Joint	MD 15-4	November 3, 2018	Fresno State - Rutgers Dual
Start of 2018-2019 Season (junior year)
End of 2017-2018 Season (sophomore year)
2018 NCAA Championships (silver) at 125 lbs
Loss	41–4	Spencer Lee	1-5	March 15, 2018	2018 NCAA Division I National Championships
Win	40–3	Darian Cruz	2-0	March 15, 2018	2018 NCAA Division I National Championships
Win	39–3	Louie Hayes	MD 8-0	March 15, 2018	2018 NCAA Division I National Championships
Win	38–3	Zeke Moisey	Fall	March 15, 2018	2018 NCAA Division I National Championships
Win	37–3	JR Wert	TF 17-0	March 15, 2018	2018 NCAA Division I National Championships
Win	36–3	Sebastian Rivera	4-1	Feb 2, 2018	Rutgers - Northwestern Dual
Win	35–3	Devin Schnupp	Fall	January 28, 2018	Penn State - Rutgers Dual
Win	34–3	Mitchell Maginnis	MD 14-4	Jan 21, 2018	Rutgers - Nebraska Dual
Win	33–3	Jacob Martin	TF 19-3	Jan 19, 2018	Hofstra - Rutgers Dual
Win	32–3	James Szymanski	MD 12-3	January 12, 2018	North Carolina -Rutgers Dual
Win	31–3	Brakan Mead	TF 24-9	January 7, 2018	Ohio State - Rutgers Dual
2017 Midlands Invitational (gold) at 125 lbs
Win	30–3	Justin Stickley	TF 19-4	December 29, 2017	2017 Midlands Invitational
Win	29–3	Sebastian Rivera	7-6	December 29, 2017	2017 Midlands Invitational
Win	28–3	Ronnie Bresser	2-1	December 29, 2017	2017 Midlands Invitational
Win	27–3	Zeke Moisey	6-0	December 29, 2017	2017 Midlands Invitational
Win	26–3	Steve Polakowski	TF 21-5	December 29, 2017	2017 Midlands Invitational
Win	25–3	Justin Stickley	Fall	December 8, 2017	Iowa - Rutgers Dual
Win	24–3	Josiah Kline	MD 19-5	December 1, 2017	Rutgers - Lock Haven Dual
2017 Black Knight Invitational (gold) at 125 lbs
Win	23–3	Alonzo Allen	MD 8-0	November 19, 2017	2017 Black Knight Invitational
Win	22–3	Steven Bulzomi	TF 22-3	November 19, 2017	2017 Black Knight Invitational
Win	21–3	Brandon Loperfido	Fall	November 19, 2017	2017 Black Knight Invitational
Win	20–3	Fabian Gutierrez	MD 16-4	November 19, 2017	2017 Black Knight Invitational
Win	19–3	Louie Hayes	8-1	November 11, 2017	Virginia - Rutgers Dual
Win	18–3	Christian Moody	4-1	November 11, 2017	Oklahoma - Rutgers Dual
Win	17–3	Brandon Cray	TF 24-7	November 4, 2017	Maryland - Rutgers Dual
Start of 2017–2018 Season (sophomore year)
End of 2016–2017 Season (freshman year)
Loss	16–3	Michael Beck	MFOR	March 4, 2017	Big Ten Championships
Loss	16–2	Nick Piccininni	INJ	Feb 19, 2017	Penn State- Oklahoma State Dual
Win	16–1	Michael Beck	TF 23-8	Feb 12, 2017	Maryland - Penn State Dual
Win	15–1	Travis Piotrowski	MD 17-6	Feb 10, 2017	Illinois -Penn State Dual
Win	14–1	Jose Rodriguez	TF 19-4	February 3, 2017	Penn State - Ohio State Dual
Win	13–1	Anthony Rubinetti	Fall	Jan 29, 2017	Penn State - Northwestern Dual
Win	12–1	Jens Lantz	MD 15-4	Jan 27, 2017	Penn State - Wisconsin Dual
Loss	11–1	Thomas Gilman	2-3	January 20, 2017	Penn State - Iowa Dual
Win	11–0	Brandon Paetzell	MD 16-2	January 13, 2017	Rutgers - Penn State Dual
Win	10–0	Tim Lambert	3-2	January 8, 2017	Penn State - Nebraska Dual
Win	9–0	Ethan Lizak	8-6	January 6, 2017	Penn State - Minnesota Dual
Win	8–0	Steven Bulzomi	MD 12-2	December 12, 2016	Binghamton - Penn State Dual
Win	7–0	Darian Cruz	7-0	December 4, 2016	Lehigh - Penn State Dual
2016 Keystone Classic (gold) at 125 lbs
Win	6–0	Tim Johnson	Fall	November 20, 2016	2016 Keystone Classic
Win	5–0	Anthony Rubinetti	MD 16-4	November 20, 2016	2016 Keystone Classic
Win	4–0	Noah Gonser	MD 12-4	November 20, 2016	2016 Keystone Classic
Win	3–0	Zack Fuentes	4-2	November 20, 2016	2016 Keystone Classic
Win	2–0	Connor Schram	3-0	November 13, 2016	Stanford - Penn State Dual
Win	1–0	Trey Chalifoux	MD 15-4	November 11, 2016	Penn State - Army Dual
Start of 2016-2017 Season (freshman year)

=== Stats ===
Season	Year	School	Rank	Weight Class	Record	Win	Bonus
2022	Senior	University of Michigan	#1	125 (1st)	16–0	100.00%	75.00%
2019	Junior	Rutgers University	#3 (1st)	133	29–3	90.63%	57.89%
2018	Sophomore	Rutgers University	#4 (2nd)	125	25–1	96.15%	65.38%
2017	Freshman	Penn State University	#3 (DNQ)	125	16–3	84.21%	57.89%
Career					86–7	90.91%	62.34%

== Awards and honors ==
2022

- (gold) NCAA Division I (125 lbs)
- (gold) Big Ten Conference (125 lbs)

2019

- (bronze) Bill Farrell Memorial International (57 kg)
- (gold) BTS: Grapple at the Garden Dual (61 kg)
- (gold) NCAA Division I (133 lbs)
- (gold) Big Ten Conference (133 lbs)

2018

- (silver) NCAA Division I (125 lbs)
