= 2021 US World Team Trials (wrestling) =

2021 US World Wrestling Team Trials
- Host city: (United States) Lincoln, Nebraska, U.S.
- Dates: September 11–12, 2021
- Stadium: Pinnacle Bank Arena

The 2021 United States World Team Trials for wrestling were held at the Pinnacle Bank Arena of Lincoln, Nebraska, from September 11 to 12, 2021. This event determined the representative of the United States of America for the 2021 World Championships at each weight class and style.

== Weight classes contested ==
Due to the delay of the 2020 Summer Olympics that ended up taking place in August 2021, with the US Olympic Team Trials for wrestling taking place in April 2021, the 2021 US World Team Trials took place months later than the yearly event usually does, and the same applies to the 2021 World Championships, which will start on October 2. USA Wrestling announced on the 2021 World Team Selection Procedures that "The 2020 Tokyo Olympic Medalist, if competing at the same weight class, will receive the automatic selection to the 2021 World Team at that same weight." Every American 2020 Olympic medalist accepted their berth with the exception of men's freestyle 125 kg gold medalist Gable Steveson, who declined in order to pursue ventures outside of amateur wrestling. As a result, there were no events at; 57, 74, 86 and 97 kilograms in men's freestyle and at 50, 57, 68 and 76 kilograms in women's freestyle.

== Tournament format ==
1. Challenge tournament (single elimination) – The first part of the trials determined who advanced over to the best–of–three finale and it took place in the first day of competition.
2. Championship series (best-of-3 match final wrestle-off) – In the second part of the trials, the finals which determined the ultimate winner took place, in the second day of competition.

== Medal summary ==
=== Men's freestyle ===
Event	Gold	Silver	Bronze
61 kg	(United States) Daton Fix	(United States) Nathan Tomasello	(United States) Carter Young
65 kg	(United States) Yianni Diakomihalis	(United States) Joseph McKenna	(United States) Evan Henderson
70 kg	(United States) James Green	(United States) Ryan Deakin	(United States) Zain Retherford
79 kg	(United States) Jordan Burroughs	(United States) Alex Dieringer	(United States) Carter Starocci
92 kg	(United States) J'den Cox	(United States) Kollin Moore	(United States) Trent Hidlay
125 kg	(United States) Nick Gwiazdowski	(United States) Mason Parris	(United States) Hayden Zillmer

=== Women's freestyle ===
Event	Gold	Silver	Bronze
53 kg	(United States) Amy Fearnside	(United States) Ronna Heaton	(United States) Areana Villaescusa
55 kg	(United States) Jenna Burkert	(United States) Jacarra Winchester	(United States) Marissa Gallegos
59 kg	(United States) Maya Nelson	(United States) Megan Black	(United States) Xochitl Mota-Pettis
62 kg	(United States) Kayla Miracle	(United States) Mallory Velte	(United States) Jennifer Page
65 kg	(United States) Forrest Molinari	(United States) Emma Bruntil	(United States) Alara Boyd
72 kg	(United States) Kylie Welker	(United States) Kennedy Blades	(United States) Yelena Makoyed

=== Men's Greco–Roman ===
Event	Gold	Silver	Bronze
55 kg	(United States) Max Nowry	(United States) Brady Koontz	(United States) Dalton Duffield
60 kg	(United States) Dalton Roberts	(United States) Ildar Hafizov	(United States) King Sandoval
63 kg	(United States) Sam Jones	(United States) David Stepanian	(United States) Dylan Gregerson
67 kg	(United States) Peyton Omania	(United States) Alejandro Sancho	(United States) Hayden Huma
72 kg	(United States) Pat Smith	(United States) Benjamin Peak	(United States) Jamel Johnson
77 kg	(United States) Jesse Porter	(United States) Fritz Schierl	(United States) Britton Holmes
82 kg	(United States) Ben Provisor	(United States) Spencer Woods	(United States) Richard Carlson
87 kg	(United States) Alan Vera	(United States) Ryan Epps	(United States) Tyler Hannah
97 kg	(United States) G'Angelo Hancock	(United States) Nick Boykin	(United States) Khymba Johnson
130 kg	(United States) Cohlton Schultz	(United States) Jacob Mitchell	(United States) Tanner Farmer

== Brackets (incomplete) ==
=== Men's freestyle ===
==== 61 kg ====
Round of 32
Tyler Graff (USA)
BYE
BYE
Dane Durlacher (USA)
Josh Kramer (USA)
BYE
BYE
Shelton Mack (USA)
Seth Gross (USA)
BYE
BYE
Ethan Lizak (USA)
Carter Young (USA)	8
Jakob Camacho (USA)	6
BYE
Daton Fix (USA)
Nick Suriano (USA)
BYE
Sean Fausz (USA)
BYE
Daniel Deshazer (USA)
BYE
BYE
Nathan Tomasello (USA)
Nahshon Garrett (USA)
BYE
BYE
Zane Richards (USA)
Brady Kyner (USA)	2
Ethan Rotondo (USA)	12
BYE
Joe Colon (USA)

Round of 16
Tyler Graff (USA)	10
Dane Durlacher (USA)	0
Josh Kramer (USA)	4
Shelton Mack (USA)	2
Seth Gross (USA)	10
Ethan Lizak (USA)	0
Carter Young (USA)	2
Daton Fix (USA)	13
Nick Suriano (USA)	10
Sean Fausz (USA)	2
Daniel Deshazer (USA)	1
Nathan Tomasello (USA)	11
Nahshon Garrett (USA)	14
Zane Richards (USA)	4
Ethan Rotondo (USA)	0
Joe Colon (USA)	10

Quarterfinals
Tyler Graff (USA)	12
Josh Kramer (USA)	5
Seth Gross (USA)	0
Daton Fix (USA)	11
Nick Suriano (USA)	0
Nathan Tomasello (USA)	3
Nahshon Garrett (USA)	12
Joe Colon (USA)	13

Semifinals
Tyler Graff (USA)	0
Daton Fix (USA)	2
Nathan Tomasello (USA)	15
Joe Colon (USA)	2

Final
Daton Fix (USA)	8	7	–
Nathan Tomasello (USA)	3	0	–

==== 65 kg ====
Quarterfinals
Yianni Diakomihalis (USA)
BYE
Dean Heil (USA)	4
Luke Pletcher (USA)	7
Evan Henderson (USA)	12
Henry Pohlmeyer (USA)	2
BYE
Joseph McKenna (USA)

Semifinals
Yianni Diakomihalis (USA)	10
Luke Pletcher (USA)	0
Evan Henderson (USA)	9
Joseph McKenna (USA)	10

Final
Yianni Diakomihalis (USA)	7	5	12
Joseph McKenna (USA)	8	2	2

==== 70 kg ====
Round of 16
James Green (USA)
BYE
Brock Mauller (USA)	9
Elroy Perkin (USA)	6
Jordan Oliver (USA)
BYE
BYE
Zain Retherford (USA)
Ryan Deakin (USA)
BYE
BYE
Tyler Berger (USA)
Brayton Lee (USA)	12
Jarrett Jacques (USA)	1
BYE
Alec Pantaleo (USA)

Quarterfinals
James Green (USA)	10^{F}
Brock Mauller (USA)	0
Jordan Oliver (USA)	2
Zain Retherford (USA)	2
Ryan Deakin (USA)	10
Tyler Berger (USA)	6
Brayton Lee (USA)	0
Alec Pantaleo (USA)	9

Semifinals
James Green (USA)	6
Jordan Oliver (USA)	4
Ryan Deakin (USA)	10
Alec Pantaleo (USA)	4^{R}

Final
James Green (USA)	6	4	–
Ryan Deakin (USA)	6	2	–

==== 79 kg ====
Round of 32
Jordan Burroughs (USA)
BYE
BYE
Hayden Hidlay (USA)
Chance Marsteller (USA)
BYE
BYE
Thomas Gantt (USA)
Evan Wick (USA)
BYE
BYE
Michael O'Malley (USA)
BYE
Joey Lavallee (USA)
BYE
Jason Nolf (USA)
Isaiah Martinez (USA)
BYE
Muhamed McBryde (USA)	0
Branson Ashworth (USA)	5
Carter Starocci (USA)
BYE
BYE
Taylor Lujan (USA)
Devin Skatzka (USA)
BYE
BYE
David McFadden (USA)
Josh Shields (USA)
BYE
BYE
Alex Dieringer (USA)

Round of 16
Jordan Burroughs (USA)	7
Hayden Hidlay (USA)	3
Chance Marsteller (USA)	10
Thomas Gantt (USA)	0
Evan Wick (USA)	10
Michael O'Malley (USA)	2
Joey Lavallee (USA)	4
Jason Nolf (USA)	15
Isaiah Martinez (USA)	11
Branson Ashworth (USA)	10
Carter Starocci (USA)	4
Taylor Lujan (USA)	6
Devin Skatzka (USA)	6
David McFadden (USA)	12
Josh Shields (USA)	1
Alex Dieringer (USA)	9

Quarterfinals
Jordan Burroughs (USA)	4
Chance Marsteller (USA)	1
Evan Wick (USA)	0
Jason Nolf (USA)	10
Isaiah Martinez (USA)	10
Taylor Lujan (USA)	7
David McFadden (USA)	1
Alex Dieringer (USA)	3

Semifinals
Jordan Burroughs (USA)	5
Jason Nolf (USA)	3
Isaiah Martinez (USA)	1
Alex Dieringer (USA)	6

Final
Jordan Burroughs (USA)	10	4	–
Alex Dieringer (USA)	5	3	–

==== 92 kg ====
Round of 16
J'den Cox (USA)
BYE
Drew Foster (USA)	10
Scottie Boykin (USA)	0
Myles Martin (USA)	10
Jack Jessen (USA)	0
Andrew Morgan (USA)	3
Kyven Gadson (USA)	14
Kollin Moore (USA)	10
Miguel Baray (USA)	0
Christopher Smith (USA)	0
Trent Hidlay (USA)	10
Timothy Dudley (USA)	7
Isaac Trumble (USA)	9
BYE
Nathan Jackson (USA)

Quarterfinals
J'den Cox (USA)	11
Drew Foster (USA)	0
Myles Martin (USA)	4
Kyven Gadson (USA)	0
Kollin Moore (USA)	5
Trent Hidlay (USA)	4
Isaac Trumble (USA)	0
Nathan Jackson (USA)	10

Semifinals
J'den Cox (USA)	8
Myles Martin (USA)	0
Kollin Moore (USA)	12
Nathan Jackson (USA)	6

Final
J'den Cox (USA)	5	4	–
Kollin Moore (USA)	0	0	–

==== 125 kg ====
Round of 16
Nick Gwiazdowski (USA)
BYE
Demetrius Thomas (USA)	10
Christian Lance (USA)	0
Jordan Wood (USA)
BYE
BYE
Ty Walz (USA)
Dom Bradley (USA)
BYE
BYE
Hayden Zillmer (USA)
Austin Schafer (USA)	6
Tyrell Gordon (USA)	2
BYE
Mason Parris (USA)

Quarterfinals
Nick Gwiazdowski (USA)	10
Demetrius Thomas (USA)	0
Jordan Wood (USA)	1
Ty Walz (USA)	1
Dom Bradley (USA)	3
Hayden Zillmer (USA)	5
Austin Schafer (USA)	2
Mason Parris (USA)	10^{F}

Semifinals
Nick Gwiazdowski (USA)	9
Jordan Wood (USA)	0
Hayden Zillmer (USA)	4
Mason Parris (USA)	8

Final
Nick Gwiazdowski (USA)	6	10	–
Mason Parris (USA)	0	3	–
