= Grand Prix de France Henri Deglane 2021 =

Henri Deglane Grand Prix 2021
- Host city: Nice, France
- Dates: January 15–17
- Stadium: Salle Serge Leyrit

The XXXXVII Grand Prix de France Henri Deglane 2021 (also known as Grand Prix of France 2021 and Henri Deglane Grand Prix 2021) was a wrestling event held in Nice, France between 15 and 17 January 2021. It was held in the memory of 1924 Olympic Gold medalist Henri Deglane.

== Medal overview ==
=== Medal table ===
Rank	Nation	Gold	Silver	Bronze	Total
1	United States	8	4	4	16
2	Turkey	6	4	6	16
3	Georgia	5	2	4	11
4	France	1	4	4	9
5	Poland	1	2	2	5
6	Sweden	1	0	2	3
7	Austria	1	0	1	2
8	Chile	1	0	0	1
8	Russia	1	0	0	1
10	Azerbaijan	0	6	6	12
11	Germany	0	1	2	3
11	Moldova	0	1	2	3
13	Belgium	0	1	0	1
14	Romania	0	0	2	2
15	Argentina	0	0	1	1
15	Estonia	0	0	1	1
15	Israel	0	0	1	1
15	Spain	0	0	1	1
15	Ukraine	0	0	1	1
Totals (19 entries)		25	25	40	90

=== Team ranking ===
Rank	Men's freestyle		Men's Greco-Roman		Women's freestyle	
Rank	Team	Points	Team	Points	Team	Points
1	Georgia	195	Turkey	305	United States	183
2	United States	175	Azerbaijan	160	Germany	150
3	Azerbaijan	128	France	151	Turkey	110
4	Poland	115	Georgia	80	France	89
5	Germany	110	United States	72	Sweden	55
6	Moldova	103	Poland	70	Italy	52
7	France	93	Austria	54	Spain	39
8	Romania	66	Spain	43	Austria	33
9	Switzerland	47	Chile	25	Estonia	15
10	Spain	28	Netherlands	23	Ukraine	15

=== Men's freestyle ===
January 16

Event	Gold	Silver	Bronze
57 kg	Nick Suriano; United States	Islam Bazarganov; Azerbaijan	Thomas Gilman; United States
57 kg	Nick Suriano; United States	Islam Bazarganov; Azerbaijan	Beka Bujiashvili; Georgia
61 kg	Beka Lomtadze; Georgia	Ayub Musaev; Belgium	Khamzat Arsamerzouev; France
61 kg	Beka Lomtadze; Georgia	Ayub Musaev; Belgium	Leonid Colesnic; Moldova
65 kg	Yianni Diakomihalis; United States	James Green; United States	Turan Bayramov; Azerbaijan
65 kg	Yianni Diakomihalis; United States	James Green; United States	Vladimer Khinchegashvili; Georgia
70 kg	Zurabi Iakobishvili; Georgia	Mihai Sava; Moldova	George Bucur; Romania
74 kg	Kyle Dake; United States	Davit Tlashadze; Georgia	Khadzhimurad Gadzhiyev; Azerbaijan
74 kg	Kyle Dake; United States	Davit Tlashadze; Georgia	Mitch Finesilver; Israel
79 kg	Nika Kentchadze; Georgia	Saifedine Alekma; France	Maxim Vasilioglo; Romania
79 kg	Nika Kentchadze; Georgia	Saifedine Alekma; France	Evgheni Nedealco; Moldova
86 kg	Magomed Ramazanov; Russia	Sebastian Jezierzański; Poland	Abubakar Abakarov; Azerbaijan
86 kg	Magomed Ramazanov; Russia	Sebastian Jezierzański; Poland	Zahid Valencia; United States
92 kg	Zbigniew Baranowski; Poland	Osman Nurmagomedov; Azerbaijan	Irakli Mitsuri; Georgia
97 kg	Kyle Snyder; United States	Givi Matcharashvili; Georgia	Radosław Baran; Poland
125 kg	Geno Petriashvili; Georgia	Robert Baran; Poland	Kamil Kościółek; Poland
125 kg	Geno Petriashvili; Georgia	Robert Baran; Poland	Nick Gwiazdowski; United States

=== Men's Greco-Roman ===
January 17

Event	Gold	Silver	Bronze
55 kg	Şerif Kılıç; Turkey	Elçin Aliyev; Turkey	Ekrem Öztürk; Turkey
60 kg	Kerem Kamal; Turkey	Murad Mammadov; Azerbaijan	Murad Bazarov; Azerbaijan
63 kg	Abdurrahman Altan; Turkey	Mehmet Ceker; Turkey	Fatih Üçüncü; Turkey
67 kg	Mamadassa Sylla; France	Gagik Snjoyan; France	Stefan Clément; France
67 kg	Mamadassa Sylla; France	Gagik Snjoyan; France	Islambek Dadov; Azerbaijan
72 kg	Selçuk Can; Turkey	Ibrahim Ghanem; France	Cengiz Arslan; Turkey
77 kg	Fatih Cengiz; Turkey	Yunus Emre Başar; Turkey	Evrik Nikoghosyan; France
77 kg	Fatih Cengiz; Turkey	Yunus Emre Başar; Turkey	Sanan Suleymanov; Azerbaijan
82 kg	Emrah Kuş; Turkey	Rafig Huseynov; Azerbaijan	Salih Aydın; Turkey
97 kg	Giorgi Melia; Georgia	Murat Lokyaev; Azerbaijan	Daniel Gastl; Austria
130 kg	Yasmani Acosta; Chile	Sabah Shariati; Azerbaijan	Sulkhani Buidze; Georgia

=== Women's freestyle ===
January 15

Event	Gold	Silver	Bronze
50 kg	Sarah Hildebrandt; United States	Evin Demirhan; Turkey	Amy Fearnside; United States
50 kg	Sarah Hildebrandt; United States	Evin Demirhan; Turkey	Jonna Malmgren; Sweden
53 kg	Sofia Mattsson; Sweden	Jacarra Winchester; United States	Nina Hemmer; Germany
53 kg	Sofia Mattsson; Sweden	Jacarra Winchester; United States	Marina Rueda; Spain
57 kg	Helen Maroulis; United States	Laura Mertens; Germany	Johanna Lindborg; Sweden
57 kg	Helen Maroulis; United States	Laura Mertens; Germany	Bediha Gün; Turkey
62 kg	Kayla Miracle; United States	Macey Kilty; United States	Luisa Niemesch; Germany
62 kg	Kayla Miracle; United States	Macey Kilty; United States	Yuliya Tkach; Ukraine
68 kg	Tamyra Mensah-Stock; United States	Forrest Molinari; United States	Luz Vázquez; Argentina
68 kg	Tamyra Mensah-Stock; United States	Forrest Molinari; United States	Aslı Demir; Turkey
76 kg	Martina Kuenz; Austria	Pauline Lecarpentier; France	Epp Mäe; Estonia
76 kg	Martina Kuenz; Austria	Pauline Lecarpentier; France	Cynthia Vescan; France

== Participating nations ==
249 competitors from 26 nations participated.

- Argentina
- Austria
- Azerbaijan
- Belgium
- Brazil
- Chile
- Estonia
- Finland
- France
- Georgia
- Germany
- Israel
- Italy
- Moldova
- Morocco
- Netherlands
- Poland
- Portugal
- Romania
- Russia
- Spain
- Sweden
- Switzerland
- Turkey
- Ukraine
- United States
