= Wrestling at the 2019 Pan American Games – Men's freestyle 57 kg =

Men's Freestyle 57 kg at the 2019 Pan American Games
- Venue: Miguel Grau Coliseum
- Dates: August 9
- Competitors: 9 from 9 nations

Medalists
Gold medal	Daton Fix; United States
Silver medal	Juan Rubelín Ramírez; Dominican Republic
Bronze medal	Reineri Andreu; Cuba
Bronze medal	Darthe Capellan; Canada

The men's freestyle 57 kg competition of the Wrestling events at the 2019 Pan American Games in Lima was held on August 9 at the Miguel Grau Coliseum.

== Results ==
All times are local (UTC−5)

Legend

- F — Won by fall

=== Final ===
Quarterfinals		Semifinals		Finals
Daniel Nascimento (BRA)	0
Daton Fix (USA)	10	Daton Fix (USA)	4
Pedro Mejías (VEN)	0	Reineri Andreu (CUB)	1
Reineri Andreu (CUB)	4			Daton Fix (USA)	11
Juan Rubelín Ramírez (DOM)	10			Juan Rubelín Ramírez (DOM)	0
Darthe Capellan (CAN)	0	Juan Rubelín Ramírez (DOM)	9
Fidel Ramos (PER)	0	Óscar Tigreros (COL)	4
Óscar Tigreros (COL)	10

=== Repechage ===
Bronze medal match
Daniel Nascimento (BRA)	0
Reineri Andreu (CUB)	10
Darthe Capellan (CAN)	8
Óscar Tigreros (COL)	7
