= 2018 NCAA Division I Wrestling Championships =

American collegiate wrestling tournament

2018 NCAA Division I Wrestling Tournament
- Teams: 62
- Format: Double-elimination
- Finals site: Cleveland, Ohio; Quicken Loans Arena
- Champions: Penn State Nittany Lions (8th title)
- Runner-up: Ohio State Buckeyes (5th title game)
- Semifinalists: Iowa Hawkeyes; Michigan Wolverines NC State Wolfpack
- Winning coach: Cael Sanderson (7th title)
- MVP: Bo Nickal ((Penn State))
- Attendance: 113,743
- Television: ESPN Networks

The 2018 NCAA Division I Wrestling Championships took place from March 15 to March 17 in Cleveland, Ohio, at the Quicken Loans Arena. The tournament went into its 88th NCAA Division I Wrestling Championships, and featured 62 teams across that level.

== Team results ==
- Note: Top 10 only
- (H): Team from hosting U.S. state

Rank	Team	Points
1	Penn State	141 1/2
2	Ohio State (H)	134 1/2
3	Iowa	97
4	Michigan	80
4	NC State	80
6	Missouri	61 1/2
7	Cornell	48
8	Virginia Tech	47 1/2
9	Nebraska	47
10	Arizona State	43

== Individual results ==
- Note: Table does not include wrestlebacks
- (H): Individual from hosting U.S. State

Weight	First	Second	Third
125 lbs	Spencer Lee; Iowa	Nick Suriano; Rutgers	Nathan Tomasello; Ohio State (H)
133 lbs	Seth Gross; South Dakota State	Stevan Mićić; Michigan	Tariq Wilson; NC State
141 lbs	Yianni Diakomihalis; Cornell	Bryce Meredith; Wyoming	Joey McKenna; Ohio State (H)
149 lbs	Zain Retherford; Penn State	Ronald Perry; Lock Haven	Matthew Kolodzik; Princeton
157 lbs	Jason Nolf; Penn State	Hayden Hilday; NC State	Tyler Berger; Nebraska
165 lbs	Vincenzo Joseph; Penn State	Isaiah Martinez; Illinois	Evan Wick; Wisconsin
174 lbs	Zahid Valencia; Arizona State	Mark Hall; Penn State	Myles Amine; Michigan
184 lbs	Bo Nickal; Penn State	Myles Martin; Ohio State (H)	Emery Parker; Illinois
197 lbs	Michael Macchiavello; NC State	Jared Haught; Virginia Tech	Kyle Conel; Kent State (H)
285 lbs	Kyle Snyder; Ohio State (H)	Adam Coon; Michigan	Amar Dhesi; Oregon State
