= Matt Ramos =

American wrestler (born 2001)

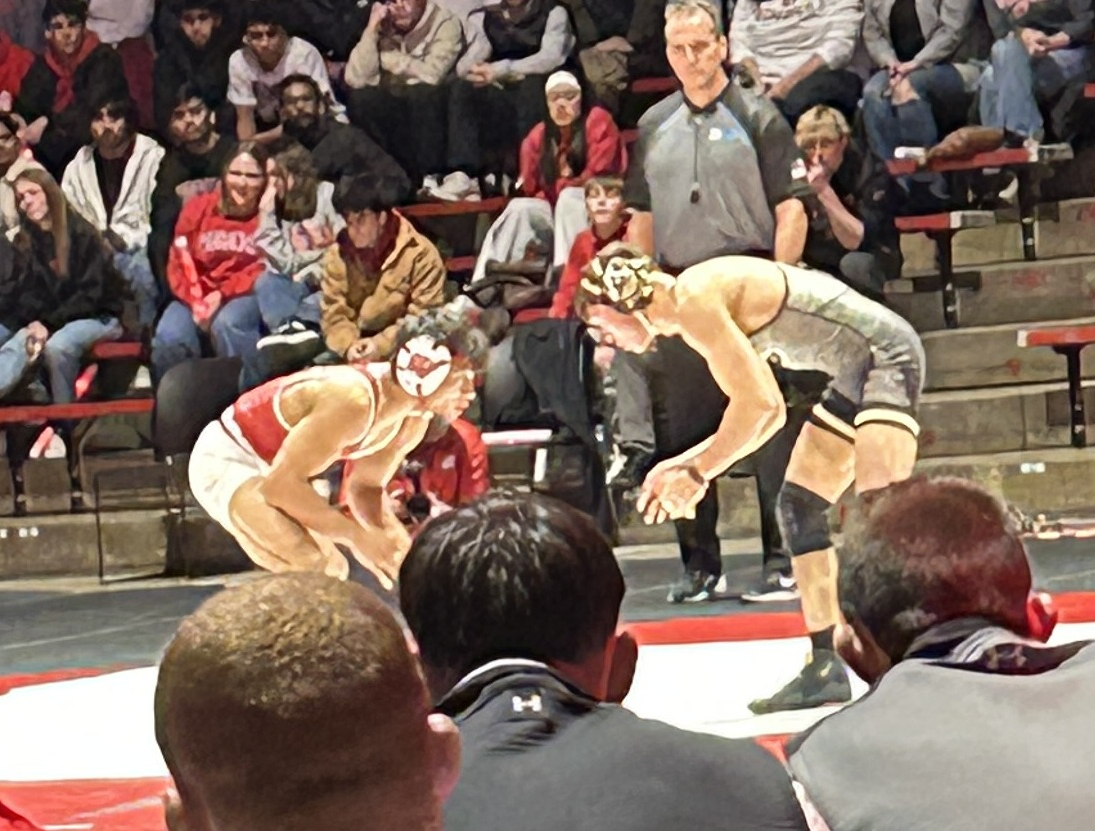
- Nicolar Rivera (left) and Ramos (right) in 2025.

Personal information
- Full name: Matthew James Ramos
- Born: April 27, 2001 (age 25) Naperville, Illinois, U.S.
- Home town: Lockport, Illinois, U.S.
- Height: 5 ft 7 in (170 cm)

Sport
- Country: United States
- Sport: Wrestling
- Events: Freestyle and Folkstyle
- College team: Minnesota (2018); Purdue (2021–2025)

Matthew James Ramos is an American wrestler.

== Early life and education ==
Matthew James Ramos was born on April 27, 2001 in Naperville, Illinois to Cresente Holanday Ramos and his wife Shelby. He has a sister and a brother. He attended the Lockport High School before entering the University of Minnesota in 2018. Ramos moved to Purdue University in 2021.

== Career ==
=== Collegiate ===
Ramos first competed for the Minnesota Golden Gophers in 2018. However he got injured and redshirted the season. He later appeared for the Purdue Boilermakers two years later.

A highlight of his career was causing an upset against Spencer Lee in the semifinals of the 125 pounds division of the 2023 NCAA Division I Wrestling Championships. Lee was aiming to win his fourth title. He later lost to Pat Glory in the final. Ramos ended his NCAA career in 2025.

=== National team ===
Ramos has competed for the United States internationally. At the 2018 Cadet World Wrestling Championships in Croatia, Ramos won the -57kg freestyle gold medal.

== Personal life ==
Ramos is of Filipino descent through his father Cresente Ramos who hails from Basista, Pangasinan. He gained Filipino citizenship in 2026.
