= Mark Hall (wrestler) =

American wrestler (born 1997)

Personal information
- Full name: Mark John Hall II
- Born: January 11, 1997 (age 29) Davison, Michigan, U.S.
- Home town: Apple Valley, Minnesota, U.S.
- Height: 5 ft 9 in (175 cm)
- Weight: 174 lb (79 kg)

Sport
- Country: United States
- Sport: Wrestling
- Events: Freestyle and Folkstyle
- College team: Penn State
- Club: Nittany Lion Wrestling Club
- Coached by: Cael Sanderson
Medal record
Men's freestyle wrestling
Representing the United States
World Cup
Gold medal – first place	2022 Coralville	Team
Pan American Games
Silver medal – second place	2023 Santiago	86 kg
Pan American Championships
Gold medal – first place	2018 Lima	79 kg
Bronze medal – third place	2023 Buenos Aires	86 kg
Ranking Series
Silver medal – second place	2021 Matteo Pellicone	86 kg
Bronze medal – third place	2015 Madrid	86 kg
Bronze medal – third place	2023 Grand Prix Zagreb Open	86 kg
US National Championships
Gold medal – first place	2021 Coralville	86 kg
Gold medal – first place	2022 Las Vegas	86 kg
Junior World Championships
Gold medal – first place	2016 Macon	74 kg
Gold medal – first place	2017 Tampere	74 kg
Cadet World Championships
Gold medal – first place	2014 Sniva	76 kg
Men's collegiate wrestling
Representing the Penn State Nittany Lions
NCAA Division I Championships
Gold medal – first place	2017 St. Louis	174 lb
Silver medal – second place	2018 Cleveland	174 lb
Silver medal – second place	2019 Pittsburgh	174 lb
Big Ten Championships
Gold medal – first place	2018 East Lansing	174 lb
Gold medal – first place	2019 Minneapolis	174 lb
Gold medal – first place	2020 Piscataway	174 lb
Silver medal – second place	2017 Bloomington	174 lb

Mark John Hall II (born January 11, 1997) is an American former freestyle wrestler and graduated folkstyle wrestler who competed at 86 kilograms. As a folkstyle wrestler, Hall was an NCAA Division I National champion (three-time finalist) and a three-time Big Ten Conference champion (four-time finalist) out of the Pennsylvania State University. As a freestyle wrestler, Hall was the 2021 US Open National champion, 2018 Pan American Continental champion, a two–time Junior World Champion and a Cadet World Champion.

== Early life and school career ==
=== Middle and high school ===
Hall was born and grew up in Goodrich, Michigan, where he started wrestling at age six at Goodrich Middle School. He played soccer since he was 4 years old until he was 10 years old and attributes his quickness on the mat to his background. He started seventh grade at Goodrich Middle School where he excelled in Football and Wrestling, but ended up moving to Union, Kentucky, to wrestle for Ryle High School. The move was originated because the MHSAA does not allow middle schoolers to compete in the varsity high school level, while the KHSAA does. In that year (2010), Hall compiled a 42–3 record and made it to the finals of the state championships at 119, where he finally lost to the defending state champion Myron Bradbury.

In 2011, Hall moved once again to wrestle at Apple Valley High School in Minnesota and decided to repeat 7th grade. He posted a 46–3 record as a seventh-grader and won a state title at 130 pounds. As an 8th-grader, he was unbeaten with a record of 43–0 and won his second state title now at 145 pounds. In his freshman year, he moved up another weight class and went on to win his third state title, this time at 152 pounds. As a sophomore, he moved up a weight class for the final time and went on to win his fourth state championship at 165 pounds, he also became a Cadet World Champion in freestyle wrestling. In his two remaining years (junior and senior) he won two more state titles at 165-pounds, making him a six-time Minnesota state champion and receiving the 2016 Dave Schultz High School Excellence Award. He also won the Junior World Championships and reached quarterfinals in the Olympic Team Trials in 2016 as a high school senior. He was named the Junior Hodge Trophy winner the same year.

Hall posted a 278–5 record overall and is often considered the best Minnesota high school wrestler in history due to his accomplishments.

== College career ==
He enrolled with the Penn State Nittany Lions

=== 2016–17 ===
At the beginning of the season, Hall was having a good redshirt season as he was 13–1 with seven pins, but he surpassed the expectations so much by comfortably winning the Southern Scuffle that PSUs Head Coach Cael Sanderson pulled his redshirt. As a true freshman, Hall went on to compete at the Big Ten Championships, where he posted a 2–1 record, making him the tournament's runner-up and qualifying for the nationals. At the national tournament, he defeated all 5 opponents, including top-ranked Zahid Valencia and #2-ranked Bo Jordan, making him the 2017 NCAA Division I Champion and receiving the InterMat Freshman of the Year Honor.

=== 2017–18 ===
Posted an undefeated 24–0 record in regular season. Went on to win his first Big Ten title, defeated #6 ranked wrestler Myles Amine in the finals and qualified for the NCAA tournament. Advanced to his second-straight final at NCAAs, but ultimately lost to the top-ranked wrestler in the country Zahid Valencia, making him the 2018 NCAA Division I Runner-up at 174-pounds. After-season, Hall won a gold medal in the prestigious 2018 Pan American Championships in freestyle wrestling.

=== 2018–19 ===
Compiled a perfect 23–0 record during regular season and avenged last year's loss at the National Finals beating Zahid Valencia 4 points to none. Won second-straight Big Ten title downing #4-ranked Myles Amine in the finals and qualifying for the 2019 NCAA Division I National Tournament. Got to the finals for the third-consecutive time defeating multiple high-ranked wrestlers, ultimately lost a close 4–3 to Zahid Valencia, making him the 2019 NCAA National Runner-up.

=== 2019–20 ===
Hall recorded a 20–1 record during regular season. In the 2020 Big Ten Conference Championships, he went 3–0, remarkably downing #6-ranked Dylan Lydy and avenging his loss in regular season by beating #2-ranked Michael Kemerer in the finals, winning his third-straight title. Going into the 2020 NCAA Wrestling Championships, Hall was seeded #1 and was a favorite to reach the finals for the fourth time and win the title a second time. However, due to the COVID-19 pandemic, the event wasn't able to take place, as it got cancelled. Hall wasn't able to finish his college career with an NCAA Title but was able to finish it with a Big Ten Championship in New Jersey. After the season, Hall earned All-American honors due to his performance throughout the season.

Overall, Hall was a one-time NCAA Champion, three-time NCAA finalist, four-time NCAA All-American, three-time Big Ten Champion and four-time Big Ten Finalist as a college wrestler.

== Freestyle career ==
=== Age-group ===
In the age-group, Hall was a two-time Junior World Champion and a Cadet World Champion in 2014, 2016 and 2017.

=== Senior level ===
==== 2015-16 ====
After making his senior debut in 2015 with a third-place finish at the Grand Prix of Spain, Hall qualified for the 2016 US Olympic Team Trials after winning the Last Chance Qualifier at 74 kilograms, but lost in the second round to the US Open champion Andrew Howe. He then went on to defeat Iran's Ahmad Bazrighaleh in a charity match at the annual Beat The Streets event.

==== 2018-20 ====
He made his return to the senior freestyle scene at the 2018 Pan American Championships, where he won the 74 kilograms championship and outscored his three opponents combined by 21 points to 1. In 2019, he once again won the Last Chance Qualifier now for the World Team Trials, but was stopped in his third match, this time by his collegiate rival Zahid Valencia.

Hall was then scheduled to wrestle Tommy Gantt on August 30, 2020, at Chael Sonnen's Wrestling Underground I. However, an injury forced him to pull out of the bout on August 27.

==== 2021–2022 ====
After almost two years of inactivity, Hall eventually came back at the PRTC Summit I on January 31, but was defeated by '20 US National runner-up Nate Jackson in his comeback. Hall then competed at the 2021 America's Cup on February, compiling victories over two-time NCAA DI All-Americans Brett Pfarr and Josh Shields, '19 U23 World Team Member Muhamed McBryde and Christopher Foca.

Hall then wrestled at the prestigious Matteo Pellicone Ranking Series on March 7. Dominating his way to the finals, Hall earned a technical fall and two falls, including one after dismantling '20 Henri Deglane International and '16 NCAA champion Myles Martin. In the finale, he was dominantly stopped by his long-time rival Zahid Valencia, claiming silver.

On March 27, Hall competed at the US Last Chance Olympic Team Trials Qualifier, in his third attempt to claim the championship and advance to the US Olympic/World Team Trials. After three straight wins, Hall was once again defeated by Nate Jackson in the semifinals, losing his chance of qualifying for the Olympic Trials. Subsequently, he won his next match but was defeated in the third–place match by fellow NCAA champion Drew Foster to place fourth.

Hall competed at the US Open National Championships from May 1 to 2. The number one seed, he ran through the bracket with technical falls up until the finale, where he battled '21 NCAA runner–up Trent Hidlay, beating him on points and claiming the US Open Championship. Hall then avenged a loss from the US Last Chance OTT by tech'ing NCAA champion Drew Foster on June 18, at FCA: Truth & Technique.

To open up 2022, Hall competed at the prestigious Yasar Dogu International on February 27, but failed to place.

== Personal life ==
Hall holds a very close relationship with his father Mark Hall (senior), stating he always keeps him in the right path and is very grateful for it. His father, who was a state runner–up in 1976, also inspired him to wrestle along with his older brother and one of his former coaches. This coach was an accomplished wrestler in Chase Metcalf, Brent Metcalf's older brother, whom Hall was very close to and considered him an older brother or father and the person who pushed him the most while wrestling. When Hall was 8 years old, Metcalf died in an automobile accident, and that experience helped him to push himself more than ever. Hall still uses Metcalf's wrestling bag to this day.

== Freestyle record ==
Senior Freestyle Matches
Res.	Record	Opponent	Score	Date	Event	Location
2024 US Olympic Trials DNP at 86 kg
Loss	66-19	(United States) Trent Hidlay	4–9	April 19, 2024	2024 US Olympic Trials	(United States) State College, Pennsylvania
Win	66-18	(United States) Max Dean	TF 12–2	April 19, 2024	2024 US Olympic Trials	(United States) State College, Pennsylvania
Win		(United States) Pat Downey	FF	April 19, 2024	2024 US Olympic Trials	(United States) State College, Pennsylvania
Loss	65-18	(United States) Alex Dieringer	2–5	April 19, 2024	2024 US Olympic Trials	(United States) State College, Pennsylvania
2024 Henri Deglane Grand Prix (silver) at 86 kg
Loss	65-17	(Greece) Dauren Kurugliev	4–10	January 19, 2024	2024 Henri Deglane Grand Prix	Nice, France
Win	65-16	(Germany) Joshua Morodion	Fall	January 19, 2024	2024 Henri Deglane Grand Prix	Nice, France
Win	64-16	(Latvia) Alans Amirovs	4–4	January 19, 2024	2024 Henri Deglane Grand Prix	Nice, France
2023 Senior Nationals (silver) at 86 kg
Loss	63-16	(United States) Alex Dieringer	0–6	December 15, 2023	2023 Senior Nationals	(United States) Fort Worth, Texas
Win	63-15	(United States) Connor Mirasola	9–2	December 15, 2023	2023 Senior Nationals	(United States) Fort Worth, Texas
Win	62-15	(United States) Taylor Lujan	3–2	December 15, 2023	2023 Senior Nationals	(United States) Fort Worth, Texas
Win	61-15	(United States) Donovon Ball	INJ	December 15, 2023	2023 Senior Nationals	(United States) Fort Worth, Texas
2023 Bill Farrell Memorial (bronze) at 86 kg
Win	60-15	(Georgia (country)) Avtandil Kentchadze	5–4	November 17, 2023	2023 Bill Farrell Memorial	(United States) New York City
Win	59-15	(United States) Connor Mirasola	4–1	November 17, 2023	2023 Bill Farrell Memorial	(United States) New York City
Win	58-15	(United States) Taylor Lujan	Fall	November 17, 2023	2023 Bill Farrell Memorial	(United States) New York City
Win	57-15	(United States) Owen Webster	5–2	November 17, 2023	2023 Bill Farrell Memorial	(United States) New York City
Win	56-15	(United States) Andrew Morgan	9–0	November 17, 2023	2023 Bill Farrell Memorial	(United States) New York City
Loss	55-15	(Georgia (country)) Avtandil Kentchadze	5–8	November 17, 2023	2023 Bill Farrell Memorial	(United States) New York City
2023 Pan American Games (silver) at 86 kg
Loss	55-14	(Cuba) Yurieski Torreblanca	1–3	November 1, 2023	2023 Pan American Games	Santiago, Chile
Win	55-13	(Puerto Rico) Ethan Ramos	7–0	November 1, 2023	2023 Pan American Games	Santiago, Chile
Win	54-13	(Canada) Hunter Lee	TF 12–2	November 1, 2023	2023 Pan American Games	Santiago, Chile
2023 Pan American Wrestling Championships (bronze) at 86 kg
Win	53-13	(Brazil) Bruno Nicoletti	TF 11–0	May 3, 2023	2023 Pan American Wrestling Championships	Buenos Aires, Argentina
Loss	52-13	(Cuba) Yurieski Torreblanca	TF 4–14	May 3, 2023	2023 Pan American Wrestling Championships	Buenos Aires, Argentina
Win	52-12	(Guatemala) Cesar Estrada	TF 12–2	May 3, 2023	2023 Pan American Wrestling Championships	Buenos Aires, Argentina
Win	51-12	(Argentina) Jorge Llano	TF 10–0	May 3, 2023	2023 Pan American Wrestling Championships	Buenos Aires, Argentina
2023 U.S. Open (bronze) at 86 kg
Win	50-12	(United States) Trent Hidlay	TF 13–2	April 26, 2023	2023 U.S. Open	(United States) Las Vegas, Nevada
Win	49-12	(United States) Andrew Morgan	8–2	April 26, 2023	2023 U.S. Open	(United States) Las Vegas, Nevada
Loss	48-12	(United States) Aaron Brooks	1-6	April 26, 2023	2023 U.S. Open	(United States) Las Vegas, Nevada
Win	48-11	(United States) Victor Marcelli	TF 10–0	April 26, 2023	2023 U.S. Open	(United States) Las Vegas, Nevada
Win	47-11	(United States) Martin Verhaeghe	TF 10–0	April 26, 2023	2023 U.S. Open	(United States) Las Vegas, Nevada
Win	46-11	(United States) Leonardo Tarantino	Fall	April 26, 2023	2023 U.S. Open	(United States) Las Vegas, Nevada
2023 Grand Prix Zagreb Open (bronze) at 86 kg
Win	45-11	(Azerbaijan) Abubakr Abakarov	7–3	February 1, 2023	2023 Grand Prix Zagreb Open	Zagreb, Croatia
Loss	45-10	(Iran) Hassan Yazdani	TF 0–10	February 1, 2023	2023 Grand Prix Zagreb Open	Zagreb, Croatia
Win	45-9	(Slovakia) Boris Makojev	7–2	February 1, 2023	2023 Grand Prix Zagreb Open	Zagreb, Croatia
Win	44-9	(France) Ruslan Valiev	5–3	February 1, 2023	2023 Grand Prix Zagreb Open	Zagreb, Croatia
Win	43-9	(United States) Trent Hidlay	6–4	June 9, 2022	2022 Final X New York – True 3rd	(United States) New York City
2022 World Team Trials (silver) at 86 kg
Loss	42-9	(United States) Zahid Valencia	TF 0–10	May 21, 2022	2022 World Team Trials	(United States) Coralville, Iowa
Loss	41-9	(United States) Zahid Valencia	0-6	May 21, 2022	2022 World Team Trials	(United States) Coralville, Iowa
Win	41-8	(United States) Drew Foster	Fall	May 21, 2022	2022 World Team Trials	(United States) Coralville, Iowa
Win	40-8	(United States) Caleb Hopkins	TF 10–0	May 21, 2022	2022 World Team Trials	(United States) Coralville, Iowa
2022 U.S. Open (gold) at 86 kg
Win	39-8	(United States) Marcus Coleman	TF 10–0	April 27, 2022	2022 U.S. Open	(United States) Las Vegas, Nevada
Win	38-8	(United States) Caden Steffen	TF 10–0	April 27, 2022	2022 U.S. Open	(United States) Las Vegas, Nevada
Win	37-8	(United States) Julien Broderson	TF 12–2	April 27, 2022	2022 U.S. Open	(United States) Las Vegas, Nevada
Win	36-8	(United States) Gavin Kane	Fall	April 27, 2022	2022 U.S. Open	(United States) Las Vegas, Nevada
Win	35–8	(United States) Myles Martin	2–1	March 16, 2022	Rudis+: Snyder vs. Cox	(United States) Detroit, Michigan
2022 Yasar Dogu DNP at 86 kg
Loss	34–8	(Georgia (country)) Tarzan Maisuradze	5–8	February 27, 2022	2022 Yasar Dogu International	Istanbul, Turkey
Win	34–7	(United States) Drew Foster	TF 12–2	June 18, 2021	FCA: Truth & Technique	(United States) Charlotte, North Carolina
2021 US Open (gold) at 86 kg
Win	33–7	(United States) Trent Hidlay	5–4	May 1–2, 2021	2021 US Open National Championships	(United States) Coralville, Iowa
Win	32–7	(United States) Michael Battista	TF 10–0	May 1–2, 2021	2021 US Open National Championships	(United States) Coralville, Iowa
Win	31–7	(United States) Nick Reenan	TF 11–0	May 1–2, 2021	2021 US Open National Championships	(United States) Coralville, Iowa
Win	30–7	(United States) Joe Williams	TF 10–0	May 1–2, 2021	2021 US Open National Championships	(United States) Coralville, Iowa
Win	29–7	(United States) Job Ayala	TF 10–0	May 1–2, 2021	2021 US Open National Championships	(United States) Coralville, Iowa
2020 US Last Chance OTT 4th at 86 kg
Loss	28–7	(United States) Drew Foster	1–6	March 27, 2021	2020 US Last Chance Olympic Team Trials Qualifier	(United States) Fort Worth, Texas
Win	28–6	(United States) Taylor Lujan	15–10	March 27, 2021	2020 US Last Chance Olympic Team Trials Qualifier	(United States) Fort Worth, Texas
Loss	27–6	(United States) Nate Jackson	1–3	March 27, 2021	2020 US Last Chance Olympic Team Trials Qualifier	(United States) Fort Worth, Texas
Win	27–5	(United States) Devin Skatzka	7–1	March 27, 2021	2020 US Last Chance Olympic Team Trials Qualifier	(United States) Fort Worth, Texas
Win	26–5	(United States) Dalton Swayze	TF 10–0	March 27, 2021	2020 US Last Chance Olympic Team Trials Qualifier	(United States) Fort Worth, Texas
Win	25–5	(United States) Ramon Fry	TF 11–0	March 27, 2021	2020 US Last Chance Olympic Team Trials Qualifier	(United States) Fort Worth, Texas
2021 Matteo Pellicone Ranking Series (silver) at 86 kg
Loss	24–5	(United States) Zahid Valencia	TF 0–11	March 7, 2021	Matteo Pellicone Ranking Series 2021	Rome, Italy
Win	24–4	(Canada) Clayton Pye	Fall	March 7, 2021	Matteo Pellicone Ranking Series 2021	Rome, Italy
Win	23–4	(United States) Myles Martin	Fall	March 7, 2021	Matteo Pellicone Ranking Series 2021	Rome, Italy
Win	22–4	(Canada) Hunter Lee	TF 11–0	March 7, 2021	Matteo Pellicone Ranking Series 2021	Rome, Italy
2021 America's Cup (gold) as TSR at 86 kg
Win	21–4	(United States) Christopher Foca	4–3	February 10–11, 2021	2021 America's Cup	(United States) Concord, North Carolina
Win	20–4	(United States) Josh Shields	5–2	February 10–11, 2021	2021 America's Cup	(United States) Concord, North Carolina
Win	19–4	(United States) Muhamed McBryde	TF 10–0	February 10–11, 2021	2021 America's Cup	(United States) Concord, North Carolina
Win	18–4	(United States) Brett Pfarr	6–2	February 10–11, 2021	2021 America's Cup	(United States) Concord, North Carolina
Loss	17–4	(United States) Nate Jackson	3–4	January 31, 2021	PRTC Summit I	(United States) Philadelphia, Pennsylvania
2019 US World Team Trials (bronze) at 79 kg
Loss	17–3	(United States) Zahid Valencia	0–5	May 17–18, 2019	2019 US World Team Trials Challenge Tournament	(United States) Raleigh, North Carolina
Win	17–2	(United States) Nick Becker	6–4	May 17–18, 2019	2019 US World Team Trials Challenge Tournament	(United States) Raleigh, North Carolina
Win	16–2	(United States) Ben Harvey	TF 10–0	May 17–18, 2019	2019 US World Team Trials Challenge Tournament	(United States) Raleigh, North Carolina
2019 US Last Chance WTT (gold) at 79 kg
Win	15–2	(United States) Chad Walsh	TF 10–0	May 5, 2019	2019 US Last Chance World Team Trials Qualifier	(United States) East Stroudsburg, Pennsylvania
Win	14–2	(United States) Quint Eno	TF 10–0	May 5, 2019	2019 US Last Chance World Team Trials Qualifier	(United States) East Stroudsburg, Pennsylvania
Win	13–2	(United States) Chad Haegele	TF 10–0	May 5, 2019	2019 US Last Chance World Team Trials Qualifier	(United States) East Stroudsburg, Pennsylvania
2018 Pan American Championships (gold) at 79 kg
Win	12–2	(Puerto Rico) Ethan Ramos	6–0	May 3–6, 2018	2018 Pan American Continental Championships	Lima, Peru
Win	11–2	(Colombia) Santiago Martinez	10–1	May 3–6, 2018	2018 Pan American Continental Championships	Lima, Peru
Win	10–2	(The Bahamas) Rashji Mackey	5–0	May 3–6, 2018	2018 Pan American Continental Championships	Lima, Peru
Win	9–2	(Iran) Ahmad Bazrighaleh	8–5	May 19, 2016	2016 Beat The Streets: Time Square	(United States) New York City, New York
2016 US Olympic Team Trials DNP at 74 kg
Loss	8–2	(United States) Andrew Howe	TF 0–10	April 9, 2016	2016 US Olympic Team Trials	(United States) Iowa City, Iowa
Win	8–1	(United States) Logan Massa	13–11	April 9, 2016	2016 US Olympic Team Trials	(United States) Iowa City, Iowa
2016 US Last Chance OTT (gold) at 74 kg
Win	7–1	(United States) Anthony Valencia	5–4	April 1–3, 2016	2016 US Last Chance Olympic Team Trials Qualifier	(United States) Cedar Falls, Iowa
Win	6–1	(Colombia) Nestor Taffur	10–6	April 1–3, 2016	2016 US Last Chance Olympic Team Trials Qualifier	(United States) Cedar Falls, Iowa
Win	5–1	(United States) Santiago Martinez	TF 18–8	April 1–3, 2016	2016 US Last Chance Olympic Team Trials Qualifier	(United States) Cedar Falls, Iowa
Win	4–1	(United States) Thomas Domerese	TF 10–0	April 1–3, 2016	2016 US Last Chance Olympic Team Trials Qualifier	(United States) Cedar Falls, Iowa
2015 Spain Grand Prix (bronze) at 74 kg
Win	3–1	(Canada) Chris Laverick	TF 10–0	July 11, 2015	2015 Grand Prix of Spain	Madrid, Spain
Win	2–1	(Spain) Sergio Blanco	TF 12–2	July 11, 2015	2015 Grand Prix of Spain	Madrid, Spain
Loss	1–1	(Italy) Carmelo Lumia	3–4	July 11, 2015	2015 Grand Prix of Spain	Madrid, Spain
Win	1–0	(Spain) Alberto Martinez Navarro	6–4	July 11, 2015	2015 Grand Prix of Spain	Madrid, Spain

== NCAA Record ==
NCAA Championships Matches
Res.	Record	Opponent	Score	Date	Event
2019 NCAA Championships (silver) at 174 lbs
Loss	13–2	Zahid Valencia	3–4	March 23, 2019	2019 NCAA Division I Wrestling Championships
Win	13–1	Myles Amine	TB 2–1	March 23, 2019	2019 NCAA Division I Wrestling Championships
Win	12–1	Taylor Lujan	5–3	March 23, 2019	2019 NCAA Division I Wrestling Championships
Win	11–1	Brandon Womack	8–3	March 23, 2019	2019 NCAA Division I Wrestling Championships
Win	10–1	Devin Kane	MD 10–2	March 23, 2019	2019 NCAA Division I Wrestling Championships
2018 NCAA Championships (silver) at 174 lbs
Loss	9–1	Zahid Valencia	2–8	March 17, 2018	2018 NCAA Division I Wrestling Championships
Win	9–0	Daniel Lewis	Fall	March 17, 2018	2018 NCAA Division I Wrestling Championships
Win	8–0	Taylor Lujan	6–2	March 17, 2018	2018 NCAA Division I Wrestling Championships
Win	7–0	Dylan Lydy	TF 21–3	March 17, 2018	2018 NCAA Division I Wrestling Championships
Win	6–0	Austin Rose	MD 12–2	March 17, 2018	2018 NCAA Division I Wrestling Championships
2017 NCAA Championships (gold) at 174 lbs
Win	5–0	Bo Jordan	5–2	March 18, 2017	2017 NCAA Division I Wrestling Championships
Win	4–0	Zahid Valencia	4–3	March 18, 2017	2017 NCAA Division I Wrestling Championships
Win	3–0	Zach Epperly	MD 10–2	March 18, 2017	2017 NCAA Division I Wrestling Championships
Win	2–0	Jadaen Bernstein	TF 16–0	March 18, 2017	2017 NCAA Division I Wrestling Championships
Win	1–0	David Kocer	8–2	March 18, 2017	2017 NCAA Division I Wrestling Championships

=== Stats ===
Season	Year	School	Rank	Weigh Class	Record	Win	Bonus
2020	Senior	Penn State University	#1 (Nationals Cancelled)	174	23-1	96.00%	72.00%
2019	Junior	Penn State University	#1 (2nd)	174	30-1	96.77%	45.16%
2018	Sophomore	Penn State University	#2 (2nd)	174	32-1	96.97%	69.70%
2017	Freshman	Penn State University	#3 (1st)	174	31-3	91.18%	61.76%
Career					116-6	95.12%	61.79%

== Awards and honors ==
- 2020
  - NCAA Division I First Team All-American (174 lbs)
  - (gold) Big Ten Conference (174 lbs)
- 2019
  - (silver) NCAA Division I (174 lbs)
  - (gold) Big Ten Conference (174 lbs)
- 2018
  - (gold) Pan American Championship (79 kg)
  - (silver) NCAA Division I (174 lbs)
  - (gold) Big Ten Conference (174 lbs)
- 2017
  - (gold) NCAA Division I (174 lbs)
  - (silver) Big Ten Conference (174 lbs)
