= Anthony Echemendia =

Cuban wrestler (born 1999)

Anthony Echemendía
Personal information
- Full name: Anthony Luis Echemendía Orduña
- Born: September 10, 1999 (age 26) Cabaiguán, Cuba
- Height: 1.68 m (5 ft 6 in)

Sport
- Country: Cuba
- Sport: Wrestling
- Weight class: 141 lb (64 kg)
- Events: Freestyle and Folkstyle
- College team: Cyclones
- Coached by: Kevin Dresser
Medal record
Men's freestyle wrestling
Representing Cuba
Cuban National Championships
Silver medal – second place	2018 Camagüey	61 kg
Bronze medal – third place	2017 Santiago de Cuba	57 kg
Men's collegiate wrestling
Representing the Iowa State Cyclones
Big 12 Championships
Gold medal – first place	2024 Tulsa	141 lb
Silver medal – second place	2026 Tulsa	141 lb

Anthony Luis Echemendía Orduña (born September 10, 1999) is a Cuban freestyle and former folkstyle wrestler who competed at 141 pounds. A two-time Cuban National medalist in freestyle, Echemendia was a two-time NCAA Division I All-American and the Big 12 Conference champion out of the Iowa State University.

== Early life and career in Cuba ==
Echemendía was born in Cabaigúan, Cuba. He started training gymnastics when he was four years old but ended up leaving the sport at the age of eight, following his father and brother's steps to start wrestling instead.

He attended and won his first U14 National Championship in 2012 and since then, he grabbed titles in U15, U17, U20 and U23. After a third-place finish in 2017, he reached the finals of the 2018 Senior National Tournament and then, while preparing for the U20 Nationals and Pan-American Championships with the U20 Cuban Pan American team in Guatemala, Echemendía defected from Cuba, sneaking away from his coaches and teammates to cross Guatemala, Belize and Mexico and finally get to the United States late in the year.

== Career in the United States ==
=== High school ===
==== 2018–2019 ====
Echemendía arrived to Tucson, Arizona in late 2018, where he attended Sunnyside High School as a senior, for one semester. He started competing in folkstyle shortly after the arrival and dominated on his way to a Division II state title at 152 pounds, compiling an unbeaten record of 22 wins and no losses. He graduated as a 2018–19 student.

Once the season ended, Echemendia went back to freestyle, and after winning the AZ state freestyle tournament, he claimed gold in both freestyle and Greco-Roman at the U20 Fargo National Championships. He also beat Josh Saunders at Who's Number One in a freestyle bout.

=== College ===
Despite unofficially committing to the Iowa State Cyclones, Echemendía ended up at the Ohio State University.

==== 2020–2021 ====
Competing in the freestyle senior level, Echemendía lost to Evan Henderson in November 2020, at FloWrestling: Burroughs vs. Valencia. He then wrestled a match against World silver medalist James Green at the FloWrestling: RTC Cup, where he was tech'd in the last seconds after a near-upset.

Making his collegiate wrestling debut, Echemendía was defeated by his teammate Dylan D'Emilio at the OSU wrestle-offs in January 2021. However, the starting spot went back–and–forth throughout the regular season. In February, Tom Ryan decided to start D'Emilio for the post-season, as Echemendía was battling an injury. He finished the season with a 4–1 record, with his lone loss coming in hands of top–ranked Jaydin Eierman from Iowa.

==== 2021–2022 ====
In the next season, Echemendía also failed to take the varsity spot, losing to Jordan Decatur at the OSU wrestle-offs in October 2021. He then decided to redshirt, and went 2–0 at an open tournament in November.

After the season and legal issues, Echemendía entered the NCAA transfer portal in March 2022.

==== 2022–2023 ====
During his sophomore campaign, Echemendia competed unattached, wrestling at five open tournaments and winning three of them during regular season. Echemendía then transferred to the Iowa State University.

==== 2023–2024 ====
In his junior and first year as a Cyclone, Echemendia started off defeating teammates Carter Fousek and NCAA qualifier Casey Swiderski to take the varsity spot at 149 pounds in October. After a 2–0 stint at the weight class, Echemendía dropped down to 141 pounds, improving to a 16–4 record and claiming a seventh-place finish at the Cliff Keen Invitational during regular season. In the post-season, Echemendia claimed the Big 12 Conference before becoming an All-American with a fifth-place finish at the NCAA tournament, closing out the year at 23–6.

==== 2024–2025 ====
In his senior and final year, Echemendía currently holds a 6–3 record and placed fourth at the Cliff Keen Invitational.

== Controversies ==
=== Altercation with his wife ===
On November 10, 2021, it was announced that Echemendía had been arrested due to an altercation with his wife, Lily Echemendía, in which he allegedly grabbed her by the neck with both hands until rendering her unconscious, leading to him being charged with felonious assault. He entered a guilty plea to a misdemeanor charge and was sentenced to time served (four days).

== Personal life ==
Echemendía's life story has been featured in documentaries by FloSports and the Big Ten Network. Since defecting from Cuba in 2018, Echemendía, was not able to see his family until 2023, when he visited his native country.

== Freestyle record ==
Senior Freestyle matches
Res.	Record	Opponent	Score	Date	Event	Location
FloWrestling RTC Cup at 65 kg – 5th for Ohio RTC
Loss	0–2	(United States) James Green	TF 4–14	December 4, 2020	FloWrestling RTC Cup	(United States) Austin, Texas
Loss	0–1	(United States) Evan Henderson	3–8	November 14, 2020	FloWrestling: Burroughs vs. Valencia	(United States) Austin, Texas
2018 Cuban National Championships (silver) at 61 kg
2017 U23 Cuban National Championships (gold) at 57 kg
2017 Cuban National Championships (bronze) at 57 kg

== NCAA record ==
NCAA Division I Record
Res.	Record	Opponent	Score	Date	Event
End of 2023–2024 Season (junior year)
2024 NCAA Championships 5th at 141 lbs
Win		Lachlan McNeil	FF	March 21–23, 2024	2024 NCAA Division I National Championships
Loss	47–9	Real Woods	0–4	March 21–23, 2024	2024 NCAA Division I National Championships
Loss	47–8	Jesse Mendez	4–6	March 21–23, 2024	2024 NCAA Division I National Championships
Win	47–7	Ryan Jack	5–3	March 21–23, 2024	2024 NCAA Division I National Championships
Win	46–7	Josh Edmond	8–2	March 21–23, 2024	2024 NCAA Division I National Championships
Win	45–7	Greyson Clark	TF 20–4	March 21–23, 2024	2024 NCAA Division I National Championships
2024 Big 12 Conference (gold) at 141 lbs
Win	44–7	Cael Happel	4–2	March 9–10, 2024	2024 Big 12 Conference Championships
Win	43–7	Jordan Titus	MD 14–4	March 9–10, 2024	2024 Big 12 Conference Championships
Win	42–7	Cole Brooks	TF 21–5	March 9–10, 2024	2024 Big 12 Conference Championships
Win	41–7	Garrett Kuchan	TF 17–2	March 9–10, 2024	2024 Big 12 Conference Championships
Win	40–7	Josh Edmond	10–9	February 25, 2024	Missouri - Iowa State Dual
Win	39–7	Cael Happel	9–6	February 11, 2024	Northern Iowa - Iowa State Dual
Loss	38–7	Tagen Jamison	SV–1 1–4	January 27, 2024	Iowa State - Oklahoma State Dual
Win	38–6	Kaden Smith	TF 23–7	January 26, 2024	Iowa State - Oklahoma Dual
Win	37–6	Haiden Drury	MD 17–3	January 12, 2024	Utah Valley - Iowa State Dual
Win	36–6	Emilio Trujillo-Deen	TF 20–4	January 7, 2024	Iowa State - Cal Baptist Dual
Win	35–6	Cody Foote	TF 20–4	January 5, 2024	Iowa State - Arizona State Dual
Win	34–6	Vince Cornella	MD 13–4	December 19, 2023	Iowa State - Cornell Dual
Win	33–6	Brennan Van Hoecke	MD 19–6	December 19, 2023	Iowa State - Little Rock Dual
Win	32–6	Cole Matthews	MD 12–3	December 19, 2023	Iowa State - Pittsburgh Dual
2023 Cliff Keen Invitational 7th at 141 lbs
Win	31–6	Vince Cornella	MD 13–3	December 2–3, 2023	2023 Cliff Keen Las Vegas Invitational
Loss	30–6	Cael Happel	3–9	December 2–3, 2023	2023 Cliff Keen Las Vegas Invitational
Win	30–5	Jason Miranda	MD 17–3	December 2–3, 2023	2023 Cliff Keen Las Vegas Invitational
Loss	29–5	Lachlan McNeil	6–9	December 2–3, 2023	2023 Cliff Keen Las Vegas Invitational
Win	29–4	Cleveland Belton	Fall	December 2–3, 2023	2023 Cliff Keen Las Vegas Invitational
Win	28–4	Devin Matthews	7–3	December 2–3, 2023	2023 Cliff Keen Las Vegas Invitational
Loss	27–4	Real Woods	SV–1 1–4	November 26, 2023	Iowa - Iowa State Dual
Win	27–3	Felix Lettini	TF 21–6	November 19, 2023	Wisconsin - Iowa State Dual
Win	26–3	Tyler McKnight	TF 22–5	November 12, 2023	Davidson - Iowa State Dual
Win	25–3	Douglas Terry	TF 24–7	November 5, 2023	Iowa State - Cleveland State Dual
Start of 2023–2024 Season (junior year)
End of 2022–2023 Season (sophomore year)
2023 Last Chance Open (gold) at 149 lbs
Win	24–3	Theo Cha	Fall	February 19, 2023	2023 Last Chance Open
Win	23–3	Danny Sheen	TF 23–8	February 19, 2023	2023 Last Chance Open
Win	22–3	Gable Fox	MD 14–4	February 19, 2023	2023 Last Chance Open
2023 North Country Open (gold) at 149 lbs
Win	21–3	Trae Thilmony	TF 22–6	January 22, 2023	2023 North Country Open
Win	20–3	Max Petersen	11–4	January 22, 2023	2023 North Country Open
Win	19–3	Gabriel Schumm	MD 14–4	January 22, 2023	2023 North Country Open
2022 Soldier Salute Open (bronze) at 149 lbs
Win	18–3	Wil Guida	4–3	December 29, 2022	2022 Soldier Salute Open
Win	17–3	Danny Fongaro	7–3	December 29, 2022	2022 Soldier Salute Open
Loss	16–3	Caleb Rathjen	3–4	December 29, 2022	2022 Soldier Salute Open
Win	16–2	Wil Guida	11–10	December 29, 2022	2022 Soldier Salute Open
Win	15–2	Matthew Williams	MD 17–5	December 29, 2022	2022 Soldier Salute Open
2022 UNI Open (gold) at 149 lbs
Win	14–2	Drew Roberts	4–2	December 10, 2022	2022 UNI Open
Win	13–2	Blaine Brenner	6–2	December 10, 2022	2022 UNI Open
Win	12–2	Nate Pulliam	11–6	December 10, 2022	2022 UNI Open
2022 Grand View Open 4th at 149 lbs
Win	11–2	Drayden Morton	3–1	November 12, 2022	2022 Grand View Open
Win	10–2	Dallas Koelzer	MD 14–4	November 12, 2022	2022 Grand View Open
Win	9–2	Jack Latimer	13–7	November 12, 2022	2022 Grand View Open
Loss	8–2	Cam Robinson	8–11	November 12, 2022	2022 Grand View Open
Win	8–1	Cole Ferguson	10–4	November 12, 2022	2022 Grand View Open
Win	7–1	Ian Heath	MD 15–6	November 12, 2022	2022 Grand View Open
Start of 2022–2023 Season (sophomore year)
End of 2021–2022 Season (redshirt year)
2021 Michigan State Open DNP at 141 lbs
Win	6–1	Nico Bolivar	8–3	November 6, 2021	2021 Michigan State Open
Win	5–1	Caleb Brooks	4–2	November 6, 2021	2021 Michigan State Open
Start of 2021–2022 Season (redshirt year)
End of 2020–2021 Season (freshman year)
Loss	4–1	Jaydin Eierman	Fall	February 7, 2021	Iowa - Ohio State Dual
Win	4–0	Danny Bertoni	8–6	January 31, 2021	Ohio State - Maryland Dual
Win	3–0	Jake Spiess	6–3	January 29, 2021	Michigan State - Ohio State Dual
Win	2–0	Dominic Dentino	11–5	January 17, 2021	Ohio State Wisconsin Extra
Win	1–0	Trey Escobar	11–7	January 17, 2021	Ohio State - Wisconsin Dual
Start of 2020–2021 Season (freshman year)

=== Stats ===
Season	Year	School	NCAA	Weight Class	Record	Win
2024	Junior	Iowa State University	5th	141	23–6	79.31%
2023	Sophomore	Unattached	DNQ	149	18–2	90.00%
2022	Redshirt	Ohio State University		141	2–0	100.00%
2021	Freshman	Ohio State University	DNQ	141	4–1	80.00%
Career					47–9	83.93%
