= Anthony Ashnault =

American wrestler (born 1995)

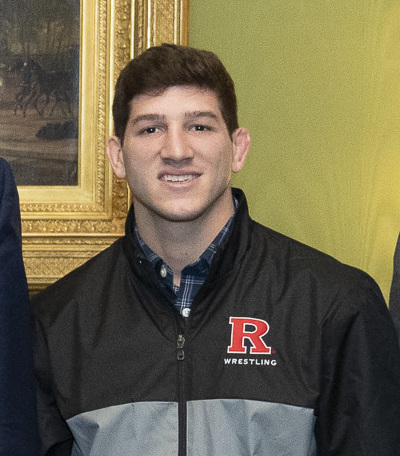
- Ashnault in 2019

Personal information
- Full name: Anthony James Ashnault
- Born: June 25, 1995 (age 31) South Plainfield, New Jersey, U.S.
- Height: 5 ft 7 in (170 cm)
- Weight: 70 kg (154 lb)

Sport
- Country: United States
- Sport: Wrestling
- Events: Freestyle and Folkstyle
- College team: Rutgers
- Club: Scarlet Knight WC; NJRTC
- Coached by: Scott Goodale
- Now coaching: Rutgers (assistant)
Medal record
Men's freestyle wrestling
Representing the United States
Pan American Championships
Gold medal – first place	2019 Buenos Aires	70 kg
Gold medal – first place	2020 Ottawa	70 kg
Men's collegiate wrestling
Representing the Rutgers Scarlet Knights
NCAA Division I Championships
Gold medal – first place	2019 Pittsburgh	149 lb
Big Ten Championships
Gold medal – first place	2016 Iowa City	141 lb
Gold medal – first place	2017 Bloomington	141 lb
Gold medal – first place	2019 Minneapolis	149 lb

Anthony James Ashnault (born June 25, 1995) is an American former freestyle wrestler and folkstyle wrestler. He currently is assistant coach for the Rutgers Scarlet Knights.

In freestyle, he was a two-time Pan American Champion, having won the titles in 2019 and 2020. In folkstyle, he was an NCAA Division I Champion, four-time All-American and three-time Big Ten Champion. He was also a four-time undefeated NJSIAA title holder as a high schooler.

== Folkstyle career ==
=== High school ===
Ashnault was born in Paramus, New Jersey and attended South Plainfield High School. He remained undefeated all four years of varsity with a record of 170 wins and no losses and went on to win four NJSIAA state titles at four different weight classes (103, 112, 126 & 138).

=== University ===
After graduating, Ashnault committed to wrestle as a Scarlet Knight at Rutgers University, where he competed at 141-pounds all years but his senior year, competing at 149 instead. As a redshirt athlete, he compiled a record of 15-3 while wrestling unattached in open tournaments.

As a freshman, he finished the season with 29 wins and 8 losses. Post-season, he placed fifth at the Big Ten Championships, becoming the highest-placing Scarlet Knight at his first tournament. At the 15' NCAA's, he placed eight, earning All-American honors.

As a sophomore, he compiled a 33–5 record through season. Brought Rutgers their first individual Big Ten title ever. He placed fourth at the 16' NCAA's to become the first two-time All-American in the history of the program.

In his junior season, he posted a record of 30–6, became a three-time All-American with a sixth-place finish at the 17' NCAA Championships and won his second straight Big Ten championship. Ashnault was initially unable to compete as a senior and missed the whole season due to an injury.

The NCAA granted Ashnault a sixth year of eligibility for the 2018–19 season. He compiled an undefeated 32–0 record through the season, in which he competed at 149-pounds unlike his previous seasons. He won his third-consecutive Big Ten Championship. Also, he won the prestigious 19' NCAA Championship, becoming the second Scarlet Knight to do so after his teammate Nick Suriano, who won the individual title in his weight class earlier in the tournament.

Ashnault graduated that year with a record of 139–22.

== Freestyle career ==
Previous to competing as a senior, Ashnault had already competed multiple times in freestyle wrestling as a junior in competitions such as the FILA (UWW) Nationals and World Trials.

=== 2014 ===
Ashnault won the University Nationals at 65 kilograms, and was scheduled to compete at a best-of-three qualifier for the World University Championship against Jordan Oliver, but Oliver missed weight and was pulled out of the event. This earned Ashnault the spot. He placed tenth at the world-level tournament.

=== 2019 ===
Ashnault competed at the Pan American Championships on April 18. He defeated every opponent he faced in the bracket at 70 kilograms, winning the championship.

Ashnault went on to compete at an exhibition bout at the annual Beat The Streets against 2017 World Championship runner-up James Green. He lost the contest by points (4-8).

Ashnault competed at the World Team Trials Challenge Tournament in an attempt to qualify for the World Championships. He won his first two bouts to reach the finals, in which he faced James Green in a rematch. When Green was rolling Ashnault's legs to get back exposure points, Ashnault suffered a knee injury which led him to a 0-10 technical fall loss and was forced to medical forfeit the second bout, awarding Green the next victory he needed to win the best-of-three.

=== 2020 ===
After recovering from the injury, the defending champion competed at the Pan American Championships in his first competition of the year. Last year's results were repeated as Ashnault defeated every opponent he faced to become a two-time Pan American Champion. This outcome qualified him for the US Olympic Trials.

Ashnault was scheduled to compete at the 2020 US Olympic Trials on April, at State College, Pennsylvania, however, the event was postponed until 2021 due to the coronavirus outbreak, along with the Olympics. Ashnault announced that he would attempt to make the team at 65 kilograms, and will do so in 2021. After the Olympic Trials were postponed for next year, Ashnault had been slated to compete against Luke Pletcher on July 25 at FloWrestling: Dake vs. Chamizo. However, he was forced to pull out of the event on July 6 due to injury.

Ashnault was scheduled to wrestle Austin O'Connor at the THWC Open I, on December 4, but was unable to compete due to conflicts with FloWrestling. Instead, he came back at the Flo Eight-Man Challenge: 150 pounds, on December 18. After a close criteria win over '20 US National finalist Evan Henderson, Ashnault was soundly defeated by three-time World Championship medalist Bajrang Punia and '20 Cerro Pelado International champion Alec Pantaleo.

=== 2021 ===
To start off the year, Ashnault wrestled the 2020 Pan American champion (65 kg) Yianni Diakomihalis on January 8, at the SCRTC I. After getting scored on with two two-point takedowns and a step-out, Diakomihalis scored a five-point slam, driving Ashnault to a technical fall. He then competed at the rescheduled US Olympic Trials in April 2, and after defeating Nahshon Garrett in the first round, he was defeated by top–seeded Zain Retherford and was eliminated by Evan Henderson.

Ashnault has registered to come back at the 2021 US World Team Trials on September 10–12, intending to represent the country at the World Championships.

=== 2026 ===
Ashnault ended his 2024 retirement from competitive wrestling at RAF 08 on April 18, losing 7–2 to Real Woods.

He intended the match with Woods as a one-off prior to his full-time shift to coaching, although Ashnault signed a three-match contract with Real American Freestyle.

== Major results ==
Year	Tournament	Location	Result	Event
2019	Pan American Wrestling Championships	Buenos Aires, Argentina	1st	Freestyle 70 kg
2020	Pan American Wrestling Championships	Ottawa, Canada	1st	Freestyle 70 kg

== NCAA record ==
NCAA Championships Matches
Res.	Record	Opponent	Score	Date	Event
2019 NCAA Championships (gold) at 149 lbs
Win	15-8	Micah Jordan	9-4	March 20–22, 2019	2019 NCAA Division I Wrestling Championships
Win	14-8	Matthew Kolodzik	2-0	March 20–22, 2019	2019 NCAA Division I Wrestling Championships
Win	13-8	Jarrett Degen	10-3	March 20–22, 2019	2019 NCAA Division I Wrestling Championships
Win	12-8	Davion Jeffries	7-1	March 20–22, 2019	2019 NCAA Division I Wrestling Championships
Win	11-8	Malik Amine	MD 10-2	March 20–22, 2019	2019 NCAA Division I Wrestling Championships
2017 NCAA Championships 6th at 141 lbs
Loss	10-8	Jaydin Eierman	2-4	March 15–17, 2017	2017 NCAA Division I Wrestling Championships
Loss	10-7	Kevin Jack	1-3	March 15–17, 2017	2017 NCAA Division I Wrestling Championships
Loss	10-6	Dean Heil	2-4	March 15–17, 2017	2017 NCAA Division I Wrestling Championships
Win	10-5	Matthew Kolodzik	6-2	March 15–17, 2017	2017 NCAA Division I Wrestling Championships
Win	9-5	Luke Pletcher	8-7	March 15–17, 2017	2017 NCAA Division I Wrestling Championships
Win	8-5	Mason Smith	8-3	March 15–17, 2017	2017 NCAA Division I Wrestling Championships
2016 NCAA Championships 4th at 141 lbs
Loss	7-5	Joey McKenna	6-7	March 16–18, 2016	2016 NCAA Division I Wrestling Championships
Win	7-4	Solomon Chishko	MD 11-3	March 16–18, 2016	2016 NCAA Division I Wrestling Championships
Loss	6-4	Dean Heil	3-8	March 16–18, 2016	2016 NCAA Division I Wrestling Championships
Win	6-3	Chris Mecate	5-4	March 16–18, 2016	2016 NCAA Division I Wrestling Championships
Win	5-3	Seth Gross	MD 15-2	March 16–18, 2016	2016 NCAA Division I Wrestling Championships
Win	4-3	Jamel Hudson	TF 16-0	March 16–18, 2016	2016 NCAA Division I Wrestling Championships
2015 NCAA Championships 8th at 141 lbs
Loss	3-2	Dean Heil	4-9	March 18–20, 2015	2015 NCAA Division I Wrestling Championships
Win	3-1	Randy Cruz	3-2	March 18–20, 2015	2015 NCAA Division I Wrestling Championships
Loss	2-1	Mitchell Port	4-9	March 18–20, 2015	2015 NCAA Division I Wrestling Championships
Win	2–0	Zachary Horan	6-3	March 18–20, 2015	2015 NCAA Division I Wrestling Championships
Win	1-0	Mike Longo	9-2	March 18–20, 2015	2015 NCAA Division I Wrestling Championships

=== Stats ===
Season	Year	School	Rank	Weigh Class	Record	Win	Bonus
2019	Senior	Rutgers University	#1 (1st)	149	32-0	100.00%	59.38%
2017	Junior	Rutgers University	#3 (6th)	141	30-6	83.33%	52.78%
2016	Sophomore	Rutgers University	#2 (4th)	141	33-5	86.84%	47.37%
2015	Freshman	Rutgers University	#18 (8th)	141	29-8	78.38%	32.43%
Career					124-19	86.84%	47.99%

== Coaching career ==
On May 23, 2024, it was announced that Ashnault would become assistant wrestling coach for Princeton University.

On April 20, 2026, it was announced that he would become assistant wrestling coach for Rutgers University.
