= Mekhi Lewis =

American wrestler (born 1999)

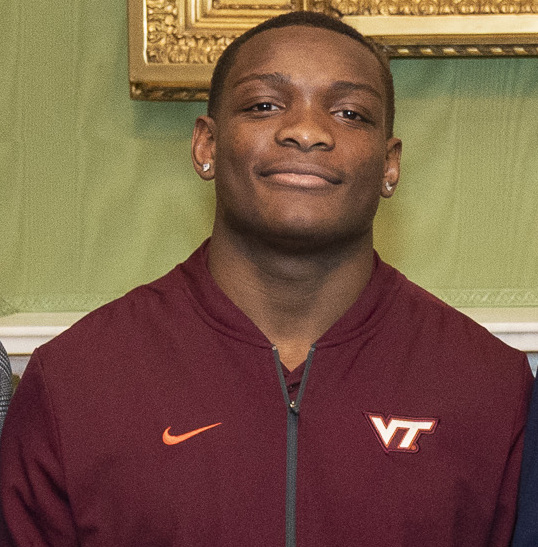
- Lewis in 2019

Personal information
- Full name: Mekhi Kevin Lewis
- Born: April 29, 1999 (age 27) New Brunswick, New Jersey, U.S.
- Height: 1.73 m (5 ft 8 in)
- Weight: 165 lb (75 kg)

Sport
- Country: United States
- Sport: Wrestling
- Events: Freestyle and Folkstyle
- Club: SERTC; Titan Mercury WC
- Coached by: Jared Haught
Medal record
Men's freestyle wrestling
Representing the United States
US National Championships
Silver medal – second place	2019 Fort Worth (SN)	74 kg
Junior World Championships
Gold medal – first place	2018 Trnava	74 kg
Men's collegiate wrestling
Representing the Virginia Tech Hokies
NCAA Division I Championships
Gold medal – first place	2019 Pittsburgh	165 lb
Silver medal – second place	2022 Detroit	174 lb
ACC Championships
Gold medal – first place	2019 Blacksburg	165 lb
Gold medal – first place	2022 Charlottesville	174 lb
Gold medal – first place	2023 Raleigh	174 lb
Gold medal – first place	2024 Chapel Hill	174 lb

Mekhi Kevin Lewis (born April 29, 1999) is an American freestyle and folkstyle wrestler. In freestyle, he was the 2018 Junior World Champion and the US National runner-up in 2019. As a folkstyle wrestler, Lewis is an NCAA Division I champion and ACC champion out of Virginia Tech and three-time NJSIAA champion as a high schooler.

== Folkstyle ==
Lewis began wrestling when he was five or six years old.

=== High school ===
He attended Bound Brook High School in New Jersey and went on to win two NJSIAA titles during his high school wrestling years. He was also on the football varsity team.

=== College ===
When he was a high school senior, Lewis committed to Virginia Tech.

==== 2017-2018 ====
Lewis chose to redshirt and competed unattached and compiled a record of 28 wins and 2 losses, winning multiple open tournaments such as the Hokie, Wolfpack, Storm, Appalachian, and Edinboro Opens. He also placed fourth at the Southern Scuffle.

==== 2018-2019 ====
As a freshman, Lewis posted a record of 21 wins and 2 losses (13-1 in duals), won the Hokie Open and placed second at the Cliff Keen Invitational during regular season. Post-regular season, he won an ACC title and entered the NCAA championships as the eighth-seeded wrestler at 165 pounds. He opened the tournament with a fall and decision before facing top-seeded Alex Marinelli, whom he also defeated by decision. He then defeated fourth-seeded Evan Wick, making it to the final against second-seeded Vincenzo Joseph. He beat Joseph to become the first Hokie ever to win an NCAA individual championship. After the tournament, he earned the Most Outstanding Wrestler award.

==== 2020-2021 ====
In 2019-2020 Lewis did not compete as an NCAA athlete. As a 2018 junior world champion and 2019 NCAA champion, he met two of the four criteria to be eligible for an Olympic redshirt, focusing on freestyle and retaining his eligibility as a sophomore.

In 2020-2021, Lewis compiled an 8–1 record during regular season, suffering his only loss via injury, which forced him to forfeit out of the ACC Championships.

== Freestyle career ==
=== Junior level ===
Lewis never competed consistently in freestyle, having attended just two tournaments (US Open and WTT) before his appearance at the 2018 World Championships, being this tournament his first international competition ever. He went on to defeat all of his four opponents (two by technical fall), claiming gold.

=== Senior level ===
==== 2019 ====
After taking an Olympic redshirt for 2019-2020, Lewis was nominated to compete at the Intercontinental Cup as his first senior freestyle competition. He defeated three opponents on his way to the semifinals, where he was downed on points and thrown to the third-place match. He also lost the bronze-medal match, placing fifth.

He then competed at the Bill Farrell Memorial in an attempt to earn a qualification ticket for the Olympic Trials. He defeated two opponents by technical fall and was subsequently matched with Vincenzo Joseph, whom he had defeated earlier that year at the NCAA championship final. He lost on points and was thrown to the consolation brackets. He beat Logan Massa and Thomas Gantt to earn a shot at the bronze medal. In the third-place match, he was defeated by three-time NCAA Division III champion Nazar Kulchytskyy.

In his next attempt to qualify for the Olympic Trials, he competed at the US Nationals. He dominated on his way to the finals with two technical fall victories, an 8-0 victory, and a decision. At the finals, he faced Bill Farrell Memorial opponent Logan Massa and was defeated on points, earning runner-up honors and a run at the Olympic Trials.

==== 2020 ====
Lewis was scheduled to compete at the 2020 US Olympic Team Trials on April 4 at State College, Pennsylvania. However, the event was postponed for 2021 along with the Summer Olympics due to the COVID-19 pandemic, leaving all the qualifiers unable to compete.

After being unable to compete for almost one year due to the COVID-19 pandemic, Lewis represented the SERTC in the FloWrestling: RTC Cup at 74 kilograms during December 4–5. In the first round against the Ohio RTC, he lost 9-2 to Carson Kharchla, but went on to close the day with a technical fall over Jevon Balfour. In the second day, he was defeated by two-time NCAA Division I All-American Evan Wick, before picking up another technical fall over Balfour and helping the team to make the finals, where he lost to 2020 US national champion Logan Massa in a rematch.

== Freestyle record ==
Senior Freestyle Matches
Res.	Record	Opponent	Score	Date	Event	Location
FloWrestling RTC Cup (silver) as NJRTC
Loss	13-8	(United States) Logan Massa	2-3	December 4–5, 2020	FloWrestling RTC Cup	(United States) Austin, Texas
Win	13-7	(Canada) Jevon Balfour	TF 17-6	December 4–5, 2020	FloWrestling RTC Cup	(United States) Austin, Texas
Loss	12-7	(United States) Evan Wick	5-11	December 4–5, 2020	FloWrestling RTC Cup	(United States) Austin, Texas
Win	12-6	(Canada) Jevon Balfour	TF 12-2	December 4–5, 2020	FloWrestling RTC Cup	(United States) Austin, Texas
Loss	11-6	(United States) Carson Kharchla	2-9	December 4–5, 2020	FloWrestling RTC Cup	(United States) Austin, Texas
2019 US Nationals (silver) at 74 kg
Loss	11-5	(United States) Logan Massa	4-6	December 22, 2019	2019 Senior Nationals - US Olympic Trials Qualifier	(United States) Ford Worth, Texas
Win	11-4	(United States) Thomas Gantt	3-1	December 22, 2019	2019 Senior Nationals - US Olympic Trials Qualifier	(United States) Ford Worth, Texas
Win	10-4	(United States) Chance Marsteller	Injury (8-0)	December 22, 2019	2019 Senior Nationals - US Olympic Trials Qualifier	(United States) Ford Worth, Texas
Win	9-4	(United States) Elroy Perkin	TF 10-0	December 22, 2019	2019 Senior Nationals - US Olympic Trials Qualifier	(United States) Ford Worth, Texas
Win	8-4	(United States) Jaison White	TF 10-0	December 22, 2019	2019 Senior Nationals - US Olympic Trials Qualifier	(United States) Ford Worth, Texas
2019 Bill Farrell Memorial 4th at 74kg
Loss	7-4	(United States) Nazar Kulchytskyy	3-9	November 16, 2019	2019 Bill Farrell Memorial International Open	(United States) New York, New York
Win	7-3	(United States) Thomas Gantt	5-1	November 16, 2019	2019 Bill Farrell Memorial International Open	(United States) New York, New York
Win	6-3	(United States) Logan Massa	7-1	November 16, 2019	2019 Bill Farrell Memorial International Open	(United States) New York, New York
Loss	5-3	(United States) Vincenzo Joseph	1-4	November 16, 2019	2019 Bill Farrell Memorial International Open	(United States) New York, New York
Win	5-2	(Slovakia) Jakub Sykora	TF 11-0	November 16, 2019	2019 Bill Farrell Memorial International Open	(United States) New York, New York
Win	4-2	(United States) James Hunsberger	TF 10-0	November 16, 2019	2019 Bill Farrell Memorial International Open	(United States) New York, New York
2019 Continental Cup 5th at 74kg
Loss	3-2	(Russia) Gadzhimurad Alikhmaev	2-6	October 14, 2019	2019 Intercontinental Wrestling Cup	Khasavyurt, Russia
Loss	3-1	(Russia) Magoma Dibirgadzhiev	3-5	October 14, 2019	2019 Intercontinental Wrestling Cup	Khasavyurt, Russia
Win	3-0	(Russia) Alibek Akbaev	7-0	October 14, 2019	2019 Intercontinental Wrestling Cup	Khasavyurt, Russia
Win	2-0	(United States) Dan Vallimont	4-1	October 14, 2019	2019 Intercontinental Wrestling Cup	Khasavyurt, Russia
Win	1-0	(Armenia) Davit Gevorgyan	3-2	October 14, 2019	2019 Intercontinental Wrestling Cup	Khasavyurt, Russia

== Junior freestyle record ==
Junior freestyle results
Res.	Record	Opponent	Score	Date	Event	Location
2018 World Championship (gold) at 74 kg
Win	11-2	(Azerbaijan) Abubakar Abakarov	5-1	September 23, 2018	2018 Junior World Wrestling Championships	Trnava, Slovakia
Win	10-2	(Mongolia) Bat-Erdene Byambasuren	TF 12-1	September 23, 2018	2018 Junior World Wrestling Championships	Trnava, Slovakia
Win	9-2	(South Africa) Matthew Bartlett	Fall	September 23, 2018	2018 Junior World Wrestling Championships	Trnava, Slovakia
Win	8-2	(Estonia) Erik Reinbok	TF 10-0	September 23, 2018	2018 Junior World Wrestling Championships	Trnava, Slovakia
2018 US World Team Trials (gold) at 74 kg
Win	7-2	(United States) Alex Marinelli	6-5	May 19, 2018	2018 US Junior World Team Trials	(United States) Rochester, Minnesota
Win	6-2	(United States) Travis Wittlake	6-1	May 19, 2018	2018 US Junior World Team Trials	(United States) Rochester, Minnesota
Win	5-2	(United States) Hayden Hastings	8-6	May 19, 2018	2018 US Junior World Team Trials	(United States) Rochester, Minnesota
2018 US Open 5th at 74 kg
Win	4-2	(United States) Tyler Dow	15-8	April 27, 2018	2018 US Open Junior Wrestling Championships	(United States) Las Vegas, Nevada
Loss	3-2	(United States) Kaleb Romero	6-11	April 27, 2018	2018 US Open Junior Wrestling Championships	(United States) Las Vegas, Nevada
Loss	3-1	(United States) Jeremiah Moody	7-9	April 27, 2018	2018 US Open Junior Wrestling Championships	(United States) Las Vegas, Nevada
Win	3-0	(United States) Jarrett Jacques	8-4	April 27, 2018	2018 US Open Junior Wrestling Championships	(United States) Las Vegas, Nevada
Win	2-0	(United States) Tanner Skidgel	TF 10-0	April 27, 2018	2018 US Open Junior Wrestling Championships	(United States) Las Vegas, Nevada
Win	1-0	(United States) Devin Bahr	5-0	April 27, 2018	2018 US Open Junior Wrestling Championships	(United States) Las Vegas, Nevada

== NCAA record ==
NCAA Championship Matches
Res.	Record	Opponent	Score	Date	Event
2021 NCAA Championships DNP at 165 lbs
Loss	7–1	Zach Hartman	MFOR	March 18–20, 2021	2021 NCAA Division I Wrestling Championships
Win	7–0	Tanner Skidgel	3–2	March 18–20, 2021	2021 NCAA Division I Wrestling Championships
Win	6–0	Brian Meyer	8–3	March 18–20, 2021	2021 NCAA Division I Wrestling Championships
2019 NCAA Championships (gold) at 165 lbs
Win	5–0	Vincenzo Joseph	7–1	March 23, 2019	2019 NCAA Division I Wrestling Championships
Win	4–0	Evan Wick	5–2	March 23, 2019	2019 NCAA Division I Wrestling Championships
Win	3–0	Alex Marinelli	3–1	March 23, 2019	2019 NCAA Division I Wrestling Championships
Win	2–0	Cael McCormick	4–1	March 23, 2019	2019 NCAA Division I Wrestling Championships
Win	1–0	Cam Coy	Fall	March 23, 2019	2019 NCAA Division I Wrestling Championships

=== Stats ===
Season	Year	School	Rank	Weigh Class	Record	Win	Bonus
2021	Sophomore	Virginia Tech	#2	165	8–2	80.00%	50.00%
2019	Freshman	Virginia Tech	#8 (1st)	165	28–2	93.33%	43.33%
Career					35–2	90.00%	42.50%

== Collegiate awards and records ==
- Freshman (18-19)
  - (gold) NCAA Division I (165 lbs)
  - (gold) ACC Conference (165 lbs)
  - NCAA Outstanding Wrestler
  - ACC Wrestler of the Year (2019, 2022)
  - First NCAA champion of the Virginia Tech Hokies' team

== Freestyle awards and honors ==
- 2019
  - (silver) US National Championship (74 kg)
  2018
  - (gold) Junior World Championship (74 kg)
  - (gold) US Junior World Team Trials (74 kg)
