= List of FloWrestling events =

During the COVID-19 pandemic, FloWrestling managed to put on a list of events while the sport of freestyle wrestling was absent.

== Background ==
During the COVID-19 pandemic in the United States, amateur wrestling, known for being an active sport with multiple competitions in the USA, was forced to close down. The biggest promotions of different sports, such as the NFL and the NBA, were absent during this time, and so was FloWrestling.

== Event list ==
=== Dake vs. Chamizo ===
FloWrestling: Dake vs. Chamizo
- Promotion: FloWrestling
- Date: July 25, 2020
- Venue: Omni Austin at Southpark
- City: (United States) Austin, Texas, U.S.
- Attendance: None (behind closed doors)

FloWrestling: Dake vs. Chamizo was an amateur wrestling event produced by FloWrestling that took place on July 25, 2020, at the Omni Austin at Southpark on Austin, Texas, United States.

Background

This event was the second major amateur wrestling event hosted in the United States during the COVID-19 pandemic after Rumble on the Rooftop. It was originally going to feature just three bouts, Kyle Dake vs. Frank Chamizo, David Taylor vs. Pat Downey and Anthony Ashnault vs. Luke Pletcher.

On July 6, Ashnault was forced to pull out of his bout against Pletcher after suffering an injury and was replaced by Darrion Caldwell on July 10.

On July 8 and 10 respectively, bouts between Roman Bravo-Young vs. Jack Mueller and Vitali Arujau vs. Sammy Alvarez were added to the card.

On July 12, the co-main event formed by David Taylor and Pat Downey fell apart after Downey had problems with the organization and withdrew from the card. He was replaced by Myles Martin on July 15.

Results

FloWrestling: Dake vs. Chamizo
Weight Class					Method	Round	Time	Notes
79kg	FS	(United States) Kyle Dake	def.	(Italy) Frank Chamizo	4–3	2	3:00	
200lbs	FS	(United States) David Taylor	def.	(United States) Myles Martin	TF 11–0	1	2:38	Martin replaced Pat Downey on short notice.
149lbs	FS	(United States) Luke Pletcher	def.	(United States) Darrion Caldwell	9–2	2	3:00	
137lbs	FS	(United States) Roman Bravo-Young	def.	(United States) Jack Mueller	8–1	2	3:00	
140lbs	FS	(United States) Vito Arujau	def.	(United States) Sammy Alvarez	TF 16–5	2	2:56	

=== Flo 8-Man Challenge: 195 lbs ===
Flo 8-Man Challenge at 195 pounds
- Promotion: FloWrestling
- Date: October 31, 2020
- Venue: Omni Austin at Southpark
- City: Austin, Texas, United States
- Attendance: None (behind closed doors)

The Flo 8-Man Challenge: 195 lbs was an amateur wrestling event produced by FloWrestling that took place on October 31, 2020, at the Omni Austin at Southpark on Austin, Texas, United States.

Background

This 195-pound prize tournament's pay-outs consisted on 20,000$ for the champion, 10,000$ for the runner-up, 5,000$ for the third-placer, 2,500$ for the fourth-placer and 1,000$ for the fifth to eight placer. It also featured two women's wrestling matches.

Results

Quarterfinals
Shakur Rasheed (USA)	7
Keith Gavin (USA)	9
Taylor Lujan (USA)	2^{F}
Gabe Dean (USA)	8
Nate Jackson (USA)	11
Sammy Brooks (USA)	1
Myles Martin (USA)	8
Drew Foster (USA)	0

Semifinals
Keith Gavin (USA)	2
Taylor Lujan (USA)	9
Nate Jackson (USA)	2
Myles Martin (USA)	5

Final
Taylor Lujan (USA)	0
Myles Martin (USA)	10

=== Burroughs vs. Valencia ===
FloWrestling: Burroughs vs. Valencia
- Promotion: FloWrestling
- Date: November 14, 2020
- Venue: Omni Austin at Southpark
- City: Austin, Texas, United States
- Attendance: None (behind closed doors)

FloWrestling: Burroughs vs. Valencia was an amateur wrestling event produced by FloWrestling that took place on November 14, 2020, at the Omni Austin at Southpark on Austin, Texas, United States.

Background

Samy Moustafa was scheduled to face Cohlton Schultz in a Greco-Roman match, however, the bout was scrapped later on.

Results

FloWrestling: Burroughs vs. Valencia
Weight Class					Method	Round	Time	Notes
185 lbs	FS	(United States) Jordan Burroughs	def.	(United States) Zahid Valencia	8–5	2	3:00	
67kg	FS	(United States) Evan Henderson	def.	(Cuba) Anthony Echemendia	8–3	2	3:00	
103kg	GR	(United States) G'Angelo Hancock	def.	(Cuba) Alan Vera	TF 9–0	1	1:23	
59kg	WFS	(United States) Alli Ragan	def.	(United States) Lauren Louive	TF 10–0	1	2:35	
160lbs	FS	(United States) Tyler Berger	def.	(United States) Sammy Sasso	8–2	2	3:00	
62kg	WFS	(United States) Kayla Miracle	def.	(Mexico) Ana Godinez	8–0	2	3:00	
97kg	FS	(United States) Kollin Moore	def.	(United States) Kyven Gadson	Injury	1	0:35	

=== RTC Cup ===
FloWrestling: RTC Cup Presented by Titan Mercury Wrestling Club
- Promotion: FloWrestling
- Date: December 4, 2020
- Venue: Omni Austin at Southpark
- City: Austin, Texas, United States
- Attendance: None (behind closed doors)

The FloWrestling: RTC Cup presented by Titan Mercury Wrestling Club was an amateur wrestling event produced by FloWrestling that took place on December 4–5, 2020, at the Omni Austin at Southpark on Austin, Texas, United States.

Background

This RTC Cup featured six top USA Regional Training Centers, with 200,000$ payouts on the line.

=== Pool A ===
Team	Pld	W	L
Spartan Combat (Cornell)	2	2	0
Ohio RTC (Ohio State)	1	1	1
New Jersey RTC (Princeton/Rutgers)	0	0	2

Pool A
Round I

NJRTC/SERTC 2 - 4 OHRTC
Weight	SERTC/NJRTC	result	OHRTC
57 kg	Nahshon Garrett	4 – 6	Jack Mueller
65 kg	James Green	14 – 4	Anthony Echemendia
74 kg	Mekhi Lewis	2 – 9	Carson Kharchla
86 kg	Nate Jackson	12 – 2	Sammy Brooks
97 kg	Ty Walz	0 – 10	Kollin Moore
125 kg	Jordan Wood	2 – 4	Amar Dhesi

Round II

SCWC 4 - 2 OHRTC
Weight	SCWC	result	OHRTC
57 kg	Vito Arujau	11 – 0	Jack Mueller
65 kg	Yianni Diakomihalis	12 – 2	Sammy Sasso
74 kg	Jevon Balfour	0 – 6	Carson Kharchla
86 kg	Drew Foster	6 – 0	Sammy Brooks
97 kg	Scottie Boykin	0 – 10	Kollin Moore
125 kg	Dom Bradley	5 – 2	Amar Dhesi

Round III

NJRTC/SERTC 2 - 4 SCWC
Weight	SERTC/NJRTC	result	SCWC
57 kg	Nahshon Garrett	9 – 14	Vito Arujau
65 kg	James Green	3 – 3	Yianni Diakomihalis
74 kg	Mekhi Lewis	12 – 2	Jevon Balfour
86 kg	Nate Jackson	2 – 4	Drew Foster
97 kg	Ty Walz	10 – 1	Jacob Cardenas
125 kg	Jordan Wood	0 – 6	Dom Bradley

=== Pool B ===
Team	Pld	W	L
Cliff Keen Wrestling Club (Michigan)	2	2	0
Gophers Wrestling Club (Minnesota)	1	1	1
Wolfpack RTC (NC State)	0	0	2

Pool B
Round I

GWC 1 - 5 CKWC
Weight	GWC	result	CKWC
57 kg	Zach Sanders	4 – 12	Seth Gross
65 kg	Brayton Lee	0 – 10	Alec Pantaleo
74 kg	Evan Wick	2 – 5	Logan Massa
86 kg	Brett Pfarr	2 – 8	Myles Amine
97 kg	Hayden Zillmer	11 – 1	Timothy Dudley
125 kg	Tony Nelson	2 – 8	Mason Parris

Round II

WRTC 3 - 3 CKWC
Weight	WRTC	result	CKWC
57 kg	Darian Cruz	2 – 13	Seth Gross
65 kg	Kevin Jack	2 – 7	Alec Pantaleo
74 kg	Hayden Hidlay	8 – 8	Logan Massa
86 kg	Trent Hidlay	10 – 6	Domenic Abounader
97 kg	Michael Macchiavello	5 – 4	Timothy Dudley
125 kg	Nick Gwiazdowski	18 – 8	Mason Parris

Round III

WRTC 3 - 3 GWC
Weight	WRTC	result	GWC
57 kg	Jakob Camacho	12 – 6	Sean Russell
65 kg	Kevin Jack	6 – 15	Mitch McKee
74 kg	Thomas Gantt	7 – 2	Evan Wick
86 kg	Trent Hidlay	6 – 2	Brett Pfarr
97 kg	Michael Macchiavello	4 – 8	Hayden Zillmer
125 kg	Nick Gwiazdowski	1 – 4	Gable Steveson

=== Bracket and medal matches ===
Medal Matches
First-Place Match

NJRTC/SERTC 2 - 4 CKWC
Weight	SERTC/NJRTC	result	CKWC
57 kg	Nahshon Garrett	12 – 4	Seth Gross
65 kg	Matthew Kolodzik	6 – 8	Alec Pantaleo
74 kg	Mekhi Lewis	2 – 3	Logan Massa
86 kg	Nate Jackson	0 – 11	Myles Amine
97 kg	Ty Walz	5 – 1	Timothy Dudley
125 kg	Jordan Wood	1 – 12	Mason Parris

Third-Place Match

SCWC 4 - 2 WRTC
Weight	SCWC	result	WRTC
57 kg	Vito Arujau	11 – 0	Darian Cruz
65 kg	Yianni Diakomihalis	11 – 0	Tariq Wilson
74 kg	Jevon Balfour	0 – 11	Hayden Hidlay
86 kg	Drew Foster	9 – 12	Trent Hidlay
97 kg	Jacob Cardenas	7 – 4	Timmy McCall
125 kg	Dom Bradley	2 – 1	Michael Macchiavello

Semifinals

WRTC 3 - 3 CKWC
Weight	WRTC	result	CKWC
57 kg	Jakob Camacho	4 – 14	Seth Gross
65 kg	Tariq Wilson	0 – 10	Alec Pantaleo
74 kg	Thomas Gantt	7 – 3	Logan Massa
86 kg	Trent Hidlay	4 – 3	Myles Amine
97 kg	Michael Macchiavello	7 – 2	Domenic Abounader
125 kg	Nick Gwiazdowski	7 – 10	Mason Parris

NJRTC/SERTC 4 - 2 SCWC
Weight	SERTC/NJRTC	result	SCWC
57 kg	Nahshon Garrett	5 – 7	Vito Arujau
65 kg	James Green	4 – 4	Yianni Diakomihalis
74 kg	Mekhi Lewis	17 – 6	Jevon Balfour
86 kg	Nate Jackson	11 – 0	Drew Foster
97 kg	Ty Walz	7 – 0	Jacob Cardenas
125 kg	Jordan Wood	–	by forfeit

Fifth-Place Match

OHRTC 5 - 1 GWC
Weight	OHRTC	result	GWC
57 kg	Jack Mueller	6 – 8	Zach Sanders
65 kg	Sammy Sasso	14 – 4	Mitch McKee
74 kg	Carson Kharchla	11 – 0	Elroy Perkin
86 kg	Sammy Brooks	2 – 1	Brett Pfarr
97 kg	Kollin Moore	2 – 2	Hayden Zillmer
125 kg	Amar Dhesi	3 – 2	Anthony Nelson

Quarterfinals

NJRTC/SERTC 3 - 3 GWC
Weight	SERTC/NJRTC	result	GWC
57 kg	Nahshon Garrett	10 – 0	Zach Sanders
65 kg	James Green	11 – 0	Brayton Lee
74 kg	Mekhi Lewis	5 – 11	Evan Wick
86 kg	Nate Jackson	11 – 0	Brett Pfarr
97 kg	Ty Walz	1 – 6	Hayden Zillmer
125 kg	Jordan Wood	0 – 10	Gable Steveson

OHRTC 2 - 4 WRTC
Weight	OHRTC	result	WRTC
57 kg	Jack Mueller	1 – 3	Darian Cruz
65 kg	Sammy Sasso	13 – 2	Kevin Jack
74 kg	Carson Kharchla	2 – 1	Thomas Gantt
86 kg	Sammy Brooks	7 – 14	Trent Hidlay
97 kg	Kollin Moore	6 – 6	Michael Macchiavello
125 kg	Amar Dhesi	0 – 11	Nick Gwiazdowski

=== Flo 8-Man Challenge: 150 lbs ===
Flo 8-Man Challenge at 150 pounds
- Promotion: FloWrestling
- Date: December 18, 2020
- Venue: Omni Austin at Southpark
- City: Austin, Texas, United States
- Attendance: None (behind closed doors)

The Flo 8-Man Challenge: 150 lbs was an amateur wrestling event produced by FloWrestling that took place on December 18, 2020, at the Omni Austin at Southpark on Austin, Texas, United States.

Background

This 150-pound prize tournament's pay-outs consisted on 25,000$ for the champion, 15,000$ for the runner-up, 10,000$ for the third-placer, 5,000$ for the fourth-placer and 1,000$ for the fifth to eight placer.

Brackets

Quarterfinals
Bajrang Punia (IND)	6
Pat Lugo (USA)	1
Anthony Ashnault (USA)	6
Evan Henderson (USA)	6
Jordan Oliver (USA)	4
Alec Pantaleo (USA)	4
Bryce Meredith (USA)	0
James Green (USA)	10

Semifinals
Bajrang Punia (IND)	9
Anthony Ashnault (USA)	0
Alec Pantaleo (USA)	2
James Green (USA)	4

Final
Bajrang Punia (IND)	8
James Green (USA)	4

=== SCRTC I ===
Spartan Combat RTC Event I
- Promotion: FloWrestling
- Date: January 8, 2021
- Venue: Omni Austin at Southpark
- City: Austin, Texas, United States
- Attendance: None (behind closed doors)

The SCRTC I was an amateur wrestling event produced by the Spartan Combat Regional Training Center and FloWrestling that took place on January 8, 2021, at the Omni Austin at Southpark on Austin, Texas, United States.

Results

SCRTC I
Weight Class					Method	Round	Time	Notes
Main card
79kg	FS	(United States) Kyle Dake	def.	(United States) David McFadden	TF 11-0	2	0:39	
65kg	FS	(United States) Yianni Diakomihalis	def.	(United States) Anthony Ashnault	TF 10-0	2	1:38	
97kg	FS	(United States) Gabe Dean	def.	(United States) Michael Macchiavello	5-5	2	3:00	
57kg	FS	(United States) Vito Arujau	def.	(United States) Michael Colaiocco	TF 10-0	2	0:39	
Undercard
	FS	(United States) Ben Darmstadt	def.	(United States) Khalil Shakur	Fall	1	0:33	
	FS	(United States) Ryan Miller	def.	(United States) Benny Gomez	TF 11-1	2	1:18	
	FS	(United States) Dom LaJoie	def.	(United States) Dominic Chavez	TF 13-3	2	0:45	
	FS	(United States) Daniel Koll	def.	(United States) Khalid Blankly	TF 11-1	2	0:46	
	FS	(United States) Anthony Artalona	def.	(United States) Josh Saunders	2-2	2	3:00	
	FS	(United States) Chris Foca	def.	(United States) Neil Antrassian	TF 13-2	1	2:20	
	FS	(United States) Jon Loew	def.	(United States) Maximus Hale	Fall	2	2:10	
	FS	(United States) Lewis Fernandes	def.	(United States) Ben Goldin	TF 14-4	2	1:15	
	FS	(United States) Colton Yapoujian	def.	(United States) Jackson Dean	TF 10-0	1	2:57	
	FS	(United States) Julian Ramirez	def.	(United States) Sam Erwin	TF 10-0	1	0:54	
	FS	(United States) Hunter Richard	def.	(United States) Matt Jenkins	TF 10-0	1	1:32	
	FS	(United States) Jacob Cardenas	def.	(United States) Khalil Belk	TF 10-0	1	0:32	
	FS	(United States) Evan Henderson	def.	(United States) Hai Siu	TF 13-2	1	2:00	
	FS	(United States) Scottie Boykin	def.	(United States) Brandon Williams	TF 10-0	1	1:20	
	FS	(United States) Max Dean	def.	(United States) Khalil Shakur	TF 10-0	1	1:10	

=== Mensah-Stock vs. Gray ===
FloWrestling: Mensah-Stock vs. Gray
- Promotion: FloWrestling
- Date: January 9, 2021
- Venue: Omni Austin at Southpark
- City: Austin, Texas, United States
- Attendance: None (behind closed doors)

FloWrestling: Mensah-Stock vs. Gray (originally FloWrestling: Burroughs vs. Taylor) was an amateur wrestling event produced by FloWrestling that took place on January 9, 2021, at the Omni Austin at Southpark on Austin, Texas, United States. The headliner was scheduled to be a showdown between five-time World and Olympic champion Jordan Burroughs and '18 World Champion David Taylor, however, the bout was postponed, and what was the co-main event ('19 World Champion Tamyra Mensah-Stock vs. five-time World Champion Adeline Gray) was moved to the main event.

Results

FloWrestling: Mensah-Stock vs. Gray
Weight Class					Method	Round	Time	Notes
76kg	WFS	(United States) Tamyra Mensah-Stock	def.	(United States) Adeline Gray	4-0	2	3:00	
97kg	FS	(United States) J'den Cox	def.	(United States) Hayden Zillmer	6-2	2	3:00	
152lbs	FS	(United States) James Green	def.	(United States) Pat Lugo	3-2	2	3:00	
51kg	WFS	(United States) Emily Shilson	def.	(United States) Erin Golston	8-5	2	3:00	
65kg	FS	(United States) Joey McKenna	def.	(United States) Nahshon Garrett	TF 12-2	2	1:59	
143lbs	FS	(United States) Ethan Lizak	def.	(United States) Matt McDonough	TF 10-0	1	1:37	
61kg	FS	(United States) Seth Gross	def.	(United States) Zane Richards	11-3	2	3:00	
215lbs	FS	(United States) Nate Jackson	def.	(United States) Wynn Michalak	TF 12-1	2	0:57	
60kg	WFS	(United States) Ronna Heaton	def.	(United States) Desiree Zavala	10-8	2	3:00	
155lbs	FS	(United States) Mitch McKee	def.	(United States) Tristan Moran	TF 11-1	1	2:15	

=== Burroughs vs. Taylor ===
FloWrestling: Burroughs vs. Taylor
- Promotion: FloWrestling
- Date: January 13, 2021
- Venue: Unknown
- City: Lincoln, Nebraska, United States

FloWrestling: Burroughs vs. Taylor was an amateur wrestling event produced by FloWrestling that took place on January 13, 2021, at an unknown venue on Lincoln, Nebraska, United States.

Background

Originally the headliner for FloWrestling: Mensah-Stock vs. Gray, the match between five-time World and Olympic champion Jordan Burroughs and '18 World Champion David Taylor was scratched from the card on January 8, after Taylor was unable to travel to Austin, Texas, due to COVID-19 restrictions, thus postponing the event for four days later and changing the location to Lincoln, Nebraska.

Results

FloWrestling: Burroughs vs. Taylor
Weight Class					Method	Round	Time	Notes
86kg	FS	(United States) David Taylor	def.	(United States) Jordan Burroughs	4-4	2	3:00	
97kg	FS	(United States) J'den Cox	def.	(United States) Nate Jackson	6-1	2	3:00	
65kg	FS	(United States) Joey McKenna	def.	(United States) Seth Gross	TF 10-0	1	1:31	
145lbs	FS (cadet)	(United States) Cody Chittum	def.	(United States) Jordan Williams	Fall	1	1:52	
117lbs	WFS (cadet)	(United States) Sage Mortimer	def.	(United States) Audrey Jimenez	8-5	2	3:00	
116lbs	FS (U15)	(United States) Anthony Knox	def.	(United States) Ben Davino	11-6	2	3:00	
