= Myles Martin =

American freestyle wrestler (born 1996)

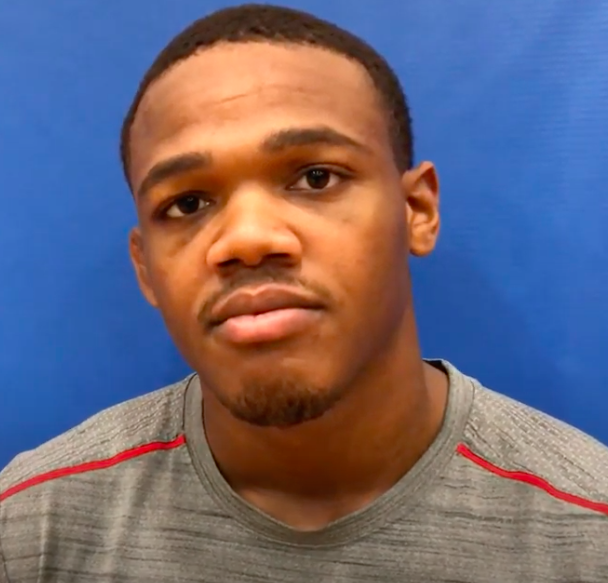
- Martin in 2018

Personal information
- Full name: Myles Najee Martin
- Born: May 20, 1996 (age 30) Penns Grove, New Jersey, U.S.
- Weight: 86 kg (190 lb); 184 lb (83 kg)

Sport
- Country: United States
- Sport: Wrestling
- Events: Freestyle and folkstyle
- College team: Ohio State
- Club: Titan Mercury Wrestling Club; Scarlet Knights Wrestling Club; Ohio Regional Training Center (formerly)
- Coached by: Scott Goodale; Tom Ryan (formerly)
Medal record
Men's freestyle wrestling
Representing the United States
US National Championships
Silver medal – second place	2019 Fort Worth	86 kg
Men's collegiate wrestling
Representing the Ohio State Buckeyes
NCAA Division I Championships
Gold medal – first place	2016 New York	174 lb
Silver medal – second place	2018 Cleveland	184 lb
Bronze medal – third place	2019 Pittsburgh	184 lb
Big Ten Championships
Gold medal – first place	2019 Minneapolis	184 lb
Silver medal – second place	2017 Bloomington	184 lb
Silver medal – second place	2018 East Lansing	184 lb
Bronze medal – third place	2016 Iowa City	174 lb

Myles Najee Martin (born May 20, 1996) is an American freestyle wrestler and graduated folkstyle wrestler who competes at 86 kilograms. In freestyle, he placed second at the '19 US National Championships and is a two-time US U23 National Champion. As a folkstyle wrestler, he was an NCAA Division I National champion (two-time finalist), a four-time All-American and a Big Ten Conference champion (three-time finalist) out of the Ohio State University.

== Folkstyle career ==
=== High school ===
Born in Penns Grove, New Jersey, Martin went on to attend McDonogh School in Owings Mills, Maryland. During his time as a high schooler, he became a three-time US Prep National champion, two-time Beast of the East champion, two-time FloNationals finalist, one-time Walsh Jesuit Ironman finalist and was also named the Baltimore Sun All-Metro Wrestler of the Year as a senior in 2015. Inside the state of Maryland, he was a three-time Maryland Independent Schools champion and finished his career with an 171–15 record, thirteen of those losses coming in his first two seasons.

Before entering his senior year, Martin competed at Who's Number One on October 18, 2014, where he was defeated by eventual two-time NCAA champion Zahid Valencia in over-time.

=== College ===
On September 30, 2014, it was announced that a junior Martin had committed to wrestle at the Ohio State University as the third-ranked recruit in the country.

==== 2015-16 ====
Martin had one of the best true freshman seasons in the history of the program. During regular season, he was originally a redshirt athlete, compiling titles from the Eastern Michigan Open and the Findlay Open and was runner-up at the Nittany Lion Open. His redshirt was pulled to start the 2016 year and he made his dual debut on January 23, against Isaac Reinemann from Illinois, whom he drove to a technical fall after scoring 23 points to 7. He closed regular season with a 6–3 mark on dual meets and a 24–5 record overall. Entering the Big Ten Conference Championships as the fourth-seed, Martin was able to place third, with a notable victory over Nate Jackson from Indiana before being pinned by the top-seed Bo Nickal from Penn State. At the NCAA championships, Martin was the eleventh seed, however, he was able to create a massive upset and make it to the finals, where he won the NCAA title by defeating the phenom Bo Nickal with a score of 11–9. This made Martin the fifteenth true freshman in history and the first Buckeye ever to become an NCAA champion and the first eleventh seed to do so since 1979.

==== 2016-17 ====
Martin then moved up a weight class, from 174 to 184 pounds. During his regular sophomore season, he won a title from the Journeyman Collegiate Classic and placed third at the CKVL Invitational and eight at the Midland Championships. In duals, he went 11–3, adding bonus points in 9 of those wins.

At the Big Ten Championships, he was able to reach the finals, where he lost to Iowa's Sammy Brooks to place second and help the Buckeyes win the Team Title. At the NCAA's, Martin, the sixth seed, was upset in the second round by the eleventh seed, after a major decision over Nick Wanzek. In the consolation brackets, he bounced back with four straight wins before his defeat to Sammy Brooks, being thrown to the fifth place match. Martin was able to claim the fifth place with a win over fourth-seed Nolan Boyd, becoming a two-time All-American.

==== 2017-18 ====
Throughout his junior season, Martin compiled 31 wins (25 of them involved bonus points) and 3 losses (all of them to his rival, Bo Nickal), leading the Buckeyes in total wins, technical falls (12), majors (7) and dual point-difference (+60). He firstly rocked 22 consecutive victories before his first loss to Bo Nickal in a dual against Penn State, and won the Cliff Keen and Princeton Open titles.

At the Big Ten Championships, he reached the finals for his second-straight year, where he caught his second season-loss to Nickal to end up as the runner-up. At the NCAA's, he comfortably compiled four victories to reach his second finale, where he was defeated for the sixth time by Bo Nickal, now by fall to end the heated rivalry 6–2 in favor of Nickal.

==== 2018-19 ====
As a senior, he went undefeated during regular season, claiming the Cliff Keen Invitational title (named the Outstanding Wrestler) and going 12–0 in dual meets. At the Big Ten Conference Championships, Martin was able to make his third straight final and claim his first title from the tournament. Going into his final NCAA tournament, Martin, the top-seed, said;

“If I don’t win it won’t be the end of the world, I’ll keep it in perspective. It’s weird that’s it’s the end, but I know I’ll still be competing. I want to win it. Everybody wrestles to win, and I’m excited.”

At the tournament, he made the semifinals with two major decisions and a pin. Going into his fourth match, Martin was a big favorite to win over Max Dean, as he had dominantly defeated him twice earlier in the season, but he suffered his only loss of the season when Dean was able to edge him by a point, creating a huge upset. Martin came back to take third-place in his final collegiate match.

As a collegiate wrestler, Martin became an NCAA champion, a Big Ten Conference champion and a four-time NCAA Division I All-American with a record of 121-19 for the Ohio State Buckeyes.

== Freestyle career ==
=== Age-group ===
In the age-group, Martin was a four-time UWW US National All-American, and a runner-up at the junior level tournament in 2015 and 2016.

=== Senior level ===
==== 2017-2018 ====
Martin made his senior freestyle debut in June 2017, when he claimed the US University National title. On October, he became the runner-up of the U23 World Team Trials to Sammy Brooks. In June 2018, Martin became the US U23 National Champion and World Team Member, after defeating seven opponents at the tournament. On November, he represented the United States internationally for the first time, at the U23 World Championships, and went 1–1 to place eleventh.

==== 2019 ====
After graduating from college in March, Martin competed a month later at the US Open Nationals. After reaching the semifinals with four straight victories, he was derailed by the eventual champion and '12 Junior World Championship runner-up Pat Downey, in a high-paced 16-point match. On May, Martin competed at the US World Team Trials, where after defeating two-time NCAA Division I All-American Nate Jackson, he was downed by the veteran and three-time All-American Nick Heflin to deny Martin the possibility of making the US World Team and send him to the consolation brackets, where he defeated '19 NCAA champion Drew Foster and Jackson once again.

On November, Martin competed at the Bill Farrell Memorial International, where after making the finals with four wins, he was defeated by the internationally experienced and three-time NCAA Division I National champion Alex Dieringer to claim the silver medal. At the US Nationals of December, Martin avenged his losses to Nick Heflin and to Dieringer, with a last-second takedown for the latter. In the finals, he was closely defeated in an exciting match by two-time NCAA DI champion Zahid Valencia, claiming runner-up honors.

==== 2020 ====
To start off the year, Martin competed overseas, at the Grand Prix of France of January. After downing '19 (returning) World Championship medalist Stefan Reichmuth in the first round, Martin compiled three wins over foreigner opponents to claim his first Gold medal from an international tournament.

Martin was scheduled to compete at the '20 US Olympic Team Trials on April 4, at State College, Pennsylvania. However, the event was postponed for 2021 along with the Summer Olympics due to the COVID-19 pandemic, leaving all the qualifiers unable to compete.

After being unable to compete due to the pandemic, Martin made his next appearance in July, on short notice (replacing Pat Downey), against '18 World Champion David Taylor, at the FloWrestling: Dake vs. Chamizo card. He was dominantly defeated by the American great. On October, Martin made his return to the top of the podium while defeating three opponents at the Flo 8-Man Challenge of October, while also claiming $20,000.

==== 2021 ====
To start off the year, Martin avenged his loss from the '19 NCAA championships by defeating Max Dean at the PRTC Summit I, on January 29. Martin then wrestled at the prestigious Matteo Pellicone Ranking Series on March 7. After a decision over '18 Pan American runner-up Ethan Ramos, Martin was defeated by three-time age-group World Champion Mark Hall to get thrown to repechage, where he claimed two more victories and claimed the bronze. On March 22, it was announced that Martin had moved back to his native New Jersey to become a resident–athlete at the Scarlet Knights Wrestling Club.

Martin competed at the rescheduled US Olympic Team on April 2, in an attempt of representing the United States at the 2020 Summer Olympics. He went 1–2, defeating reigning NCAA champion Carter Starocci in the consolation bracket.

Martin had registered to compete at the prestigious Poland Open on June 8, moving up to 92 kilograms, but eventually pulled out. However, he remained with the intent of moving up a weight class and will now compete at the 2021 US World Team Trials on September 11–12 as the fifth-seed, intending to represent the country at the World Championships.

== Freestyle record ==
Senior & U23 Freestyle Matches
Res.	Record	Opponent	Score	Date	Event	Location
Loss	46–14	(United States) Mark Hall	1–2	March 16, 2022	Rudis+: Snyder vs. Cox	(United States) Detroit, Michigan
2021 US World Team Trials DNP at 92 kg
Loss	46–13	(United States) Trent Hidlay	5–9	September 11, 2021	2021 US World Team Trials	(United States) Lincoln, Nebraska
Loss	46–12	(United States) J'den Cox	0–8	September 11, 2021	2021 US World Team Trials	(United States) Lincoln, Nebraska
Win	46–11	(United States) Kyven Gadson	4–0	September 11, 2021	2021 US World Team Trials	(United States) Lincoln, Nebraska
Win	45–11	(United States) Jack Jessen	TF 10–0	September 11, 2021	2021 US World Team Trials	(United States) Lincoln, Nebraska
2020 US Olympic Team Trials DNP at 86 kg
Loss	44–11	(United States) Nate Jackson	1–2	April 2–3, 2021	2020 US Olympic Team Trials	(United States) Fort Worth, Texas
Win	44–10	(United States) Carter Starocci	5–2	April 2–3, 2021	2020 US Olympic Team Trials	(United States) Fort Worth, Texas
Loss	43–10	(United States) Gabe Dean	1–2	April 2–3, 2021	2020 US Olympic Team Trials	(United States) Fort Worth, Texas
2021 Matteo Pellicone Ranking Series (bronze) at 86 kg
Win	43–9	(Canada) Clayton Pye	TF 12–2	March 7, 2021	Matteo Pellicone Ranking Series 2021	Rome, Italy
Win	42–9	(Canada) Hunter Lee	TF 10–0	March 7, 2021	Matteo Pellicone Ranking Series 2021	Rome, Italy
Loss	41–9	(United States) Mark Hall	Fall	March 7, 2021	Matteo Pellicone Ranking Series 2021	Rome, Italy
Win	41–8	(Puerto Rico) Ethan Ramos	6–3	March 7, 2021	Matteo Pellicone Ranking Series 2021	Rome, Italy
Win	40–8	(United States) Max Dean	4–2	January 31, 2021	PRTC Summit I	(United States) Philadelphia, Pennsylvania
Flo 8-Man Challenge (gold) at 195lbs
Win	39-8	(United States) Taylor Lujan	TF 10-0	October 31, 2020	FloWrestling 8-Man Challenge	United States
Win	38-8	(United States) Nate Jackson	5-2	October 31, 2020	FloWrestling 8-Man Challenge	United States
Win	37-8	(United States) Drew Foster	8-0	October 31, 2020	FloWrestling 8-Man Challenge	United States
Loss	36-8	(United States) David Taylor	TF 0-11	July 25, 2020	FloWrestling: Dake vs. Chamizo	(United States) Austin, Texas
2020 Henri Deglane Grand Prix (gold) at 86kg
Win	36-7	(France) Akhmed Aibuev	10-6	January 18–19, 2020	2020 Grand Prix de France Henri Deglane	Nice, France
Win	35-7	(Belarus) Rasul Tsikhayeu	TF 12-2	January 18–19, 2020	2020 Grand Prix de France Henri Deglane	Nice, France
Win	34-7	(Kazakhstan) Abdimanap Baigenzheyev	6-0	January 18–19, 2020	2020 Grand Prix de France Henri Deglane	Nice, France
Win	33-7	(Switzerland) Stefan Reichmuth	9-5	January 18–19, 2020	2020 Grand Prix de France Henri Deglane	Nice, France
2019 US Nationals (silver) at 86 kg
Loss	32-7	(United States) Zahid Valencia	5-7	December 20–22, 2019	2019 Senior Nationals - US Olympic Trials Qualifier	(United States) Fort Worth, Texas
Win	32-6	(United States) Alex Dieringer	6-4	December 20–22, 2019	2019 Senior Nationals - US Olympic Trials Qualifier	(United States) Fort Worth, Texas
Win	31-6	(United States) Nick Heflin	7-0	December 20–22, 2019	2019 Senior Nationals - US Olympic Trials Qualifier	(United States) Fort Worth, Texas
Win	30-6	(United States) Leonardo Tarantino	TF 12-2	December 20–22, 2019	2019 Senior Nationals - US Olympic Trials Qualifier	(United States) Fort Worth, Texas
Win	29-6	(United States) Ramon Fry	TF 10-0	December 20–22, 2019	2019 Senior Nationals - US Olympic Trials Qualifier	(United States) Fort Worth, Texas
2019 Bill Farrell Memorial (silver) at 86kg
Loss	28-6	(United States) Alex Dieringer	2-7	November 15–16, 2019	2019 Bill Farrell Memorial International Open	(United States) New York City, New York
Win	28-5	(United States) Brett Pfarr	4-3	November 15–16, 2019	2019 Bill Farrell Memorial International Open	(United States) New York City, New York
Win	27-5	(United States) Nate Jackson	TF 10-0	November 15–16, 2019	2019 Bill Farrell Memorial International Open	(United States) New York City, New York
Win	26-5	(United Kingdom) Sidus Eslami	TF 10-0	November 15–16, 2019	2019 Bill Farrell Memorial International Open	(United States) New York City, New York
Win	25-5	(United States) Kevin Radford	4-2	November 15–16, 2019	2019 Bill Farrell Memorial International Open	(United States) New York City, New York
2019 US World Team Trials 4th at 86kg
Win	24-5	(United States) Nate Jackson	TF 10-0	May 17–19, 2019	2019 US World Team Trials Challenge	(United States) Raleigh, North Carolina
Win	23-5	(United States) Drew Foster	TF 10-0	May 17–19, 2019	2019 US World Team Trials Challenge	(United States) Raleigh, North Carolina
Loss	22-5	(United States) Nick Heflin	1-4	May 17–19, 2019	2019 US World Team Trials Challenge	(United States) Raleigh, North Carolina
Win	22-4	(United States) Nate Jackson	5-0	May 17–19, 2019	2019 US World Team Trials Challenge	(United States) Raleigh, North Carolina
2019 US Open 6th at 86kg
Loss	21-4	(United States) Pat Downey	7-9	April 24–27, 2019	2019 US Open Championships	(United States) Las Vegas, Nevada
Win	21-3	(United States) Kevin Radford	8-1	April 24–27, 2019	2019 US Open Championships	(United States) Las Vegas, Nevada
Win	20-3	(United States) Ruger Wyneken	TF 10-0	April 24–27, 2019	2019 US Open Championships	(United States) Las Vegas, Nevada
Win	19-3	(United States) Colby Huynh	TF 11-0	April 24–27, 2019	2019 US Open Championships	(United States) Las Vegas, Nevada
Win	18-3	(United States) Tanner Orndorff	TF 12-2	April 24–27, 2019	2019 US Open Championships	(United States) Las Vegas, Nevada
2018 U23 World Championships 11th at 86kg
Loss	17-3	(Mongolia) Ganbaataryn Gankhuyag	1-6	November 12–18, 2018	2018 World U23 Wrestling Championship	Bucharest, Romania
Win	17-2	(Uzbekistan) Javrail Shapiev	9-6	November 12–18, 2018	2018 World U23 Wrestling Championship	Bucharest, Romania
2018 US U23 Nationals & World Team Trials (gold) at 86kg
Win	16-2	(United States) Chandler Rogers	Fall	June 1–3, 2018	2018 US U23 World Team Trials	(United States) Akron, Ohio
Win	15-2	(United States) Chandler Rogers	13-9	June 1–3, 2018	2018 US U23 World Team Trials	(United States) Akron, Ohio
Win	14-2	(United States) Maxwell Dean	TF 10-0	June 1–3, 2018	2018 US U23 National Championships	(United States) Akron, Ohio
Win	13-2	(United States) Cash Wilcke	TF 10-0	June 1–3, 2018	2018 US U23 National Championships	(United States) Akron, Ohio
Win	12-2	(United States) Brandon Krone	TF 10-0	June 1–3, 2018	2018 US U23 National Championships	(United States) Akron, Ohio
Win	11-2	(United States) Tyler Rosenbaum	TF 10-0	June 1–3, 2018	2018 US U23 National Championships	(United States) Akron, Ohio
Win	10-2	(United States) Jackson Hemauer	TF 10-0	June 1–3, 2018	2018 US U23 National Championships	(United States) Akron, Ohio
2017 U23 World Team Trials (silver) at 86kg
Loss	9-2	(United States) Sammy Brooks	8-13	October 7–8, 2017	2017 US U23 World Team Trials	(United States) Rochester, Minnesota
Loss	9-1	(United States) Sammy Brooks	5-9	October 7–8, 2017	2017 US U23 World Team Trials	(United States) Rochester, Minnesota
Win	9-0	(United States) Jaron Smith	7-4	October 7–8, 2017	2017 US U23 World Team Trials Challenge	(United States) Rochester, Minnesota
Win	8-0	(United States) David Willoughby	TF 11-0	October 7–8, 2017	2017 US U23 World Team Trials Challenge	(United States) Rochester, Minnesota
Win	7-0	(United States) Faris Karaborni	TF 10-0	October 7–8, 2017	2017 US U23 World Team Trials Challenge	(United States) Rochester, Minnesota
2017 US University Nationals (gold) at 86kg
Win	6-0	(United States) Peter Renda	4-2	June 2–4, 2017	2017 US University National Championships	(United States) Akron, Ohio
Win	5-0	(United States) Keegan Moore	TF 10-0	June 2–4, 2017	2017 US University National Championships	(United States) Akron, Ohio
Win	4-0	(United States) Nick Gravina	Injury (4-0)	June 2–4, 2017	2017 US University National Championships	(United States) Akron, Ohio
Win	3-0	(United States) Taylor Jackson	TF 10-0	June 2–4, 2017	2017 US University National Championships	(United States) Akron, Ohio
Win	2-0	(United States) Will Schany	Fall	June 2–4, 2017	2017 US University National Championships	(United States) Akron, Ohio
Win	1-0	(United States) Maxwell Dean	TF 11-0	June 2–4, 2017	2017 US University National Championships	(United States) Akron, Ohio

== NCAA record ==
NCAA Championships Matches
Res.	Record	Opponent	Score	Date	Event
2019 NCAA Championships (bronze) at 184 lbs
Win	19-4	Emery Parker	5-3	March 21–23, 2019	2019 NCAA Division I Wrestling Championships
Loss	18-4	Maxwell Dean	4-5	March 21–23, 2019	2019 NCAA Division I Wrestling Championships
Win	18-3	Ryan Preisch	MD 11-2	March 21–23, 2019	2019 NCAA Division I Wrestling Championships
Win	17-3	Corey Hazel	MD 16-5	March 21–23, 2019	2019 NCAA Division I Wrestling Championships
Win	16-3	Bob Coleman	Fall	March 21–23, 2019	2019 NCAA Division I Wrestling Championships
2018 NCAA Championships (silver) at 184 lbs
Loss	15-3	Bo Nickal	Fall	March 15–17, 2018	2018 NCAA Division I Wrestling Championships
Win	15-2	Zachary Zavatsky	8-4	March 15–17, 2018	2018 NCAA Division I Wrestling Championships
Win	14-2	Chip Ness	10-6	March 15–17, 2018	2018 NCAA Division I Wrestling Championships
Win	13-2	Mitchell Bowman	MD 17-5	March 15–17, 2018	2018 NCAA Division I Wrestling Championships
Win	12-2	Bryce Gorman	TF 24-9	March 15–17, 2018	2018 NCAA Division I Wrestling Championships
2017 NCAA Championships 5th at 184 lbs
Win	11-2	Nolan Boyd	10-6	March 16–18, 2017	2017 NCAA Division I Wrestling Championships
Loss	10-2	Sammy Brooks	2-6	March 16–18, 2017	2017 NCAA Division I Wrestling Championships
Win	10-1	Drew Foster	8-6	March 16–18, 2017	2017 NCAA Division I Wrestling Championships
Win	9-1	Jack Dechow	TB-1 3-2	March 16–18, 2017	2017 NCAA Division I Wrestling Championships
Win	8-1	Dakota Geer	MD 12-3	March 16–18, 2017	2017 NCAA Division I Wrestling Championships
Win	7-1	Joe Heyob	TF 18-3	March 16–18, 2017	2017 NCAA Division I Wrestling Championships
Loss	6-1	Emery Parker	9-14	March 16–18, 2017	2017 NCAA Division I Wrestling Championships
Win	6–0	Garrett Hoffman	MD 23-10	March 16–18, 2017	2017 NCAA Division I Wrestling Championships
2016 NCAA Championships (gold) at 174 lbs
Win	5–0	Bo Nickal	11-9	March 17–19, 2016	2016 NCAA Division I Wrestling Championships
Win	4–0	Lelund Weatherspoon	8-2	March 17–19, 2016	2016 NCAA Division I Wrestling Championships
Win	3–0	Matt Reed	2-0	March 17–19, 2016	2016 NCAA Division I Wrestling Championships
Win	2–0	Bryce Hammond	5-3	March 17–19, 2016	2016 NCAA Division I Wrestling Championships
Win	1–0	Nick Wanzek	MD 12-4	March 17–19, 2016	2016 NCAA Division I Wrestling Championships

=== Stats ===
Season	Year	School	Rank	Weigh Class	Record	Win	Bonus
2019	Senior	Ohio State University	#1 (3rd)	184	25-1	96.15%	61.54%
2018	Junior	Ohio State University	#2 (2nd)	184	31-3	91.18%	70.59%
2017	Sophomore	Ohio State University	#6 (5th)	184	32-9	78.05%	53.66%
2016	Freshman	Ohio State University	#11 (1st)	174	33-6	84.62%	51.28%
Career					121-19	86.43%	58.57%
