= 2019 NCAA Division I Wrestling Championships =

American collegiate wrestling tournament

- Teams: 62
- Format: Knockout
- Finals site: Pittsburgh, Pennsylvania; PPG Paints Arena
- Champions: Penn State Nittany Lions (9th title)
- Runner-up: Ohio State Buckeyes (6th title game)
- Semifinalists: Oklahoma State Cowboys; Iowa Hawkeyes
- Winning coach: Cael Sanderson (8th title)
- MVP: Mekhi Lewis (Virginia Tech)
- Attendance: 109,405
- Television: ESPN Networks

The 2019 NCAA Division I Wrestling Championships took place from March 21 to March 23 in Pittsburgh, Pennsylvania at the PPG Paints Arena. The tournament was the 89th NCAA Division I Wrestling Championships, and featured seventy teams across that level.

Penn State won their fourth consecutive title and eighth in nine years. Two programs had their first national champions: Virginia Tech (Mekhi Lewis, who was named Outstanding Wrestler), and Rutgers (Nick Suriano and Anthony Ashnault).

Rutgers Scarlet Knights head coach Scott Goodale was named NCAA Tournament Coach of the Year.

== Team results ==
- Note: Top 10 only
- (H): Team from hosting U.S. state

Rank	Team	Points
1	Penn State (H)	137 1/2
2	Ohio State	96 1/2
3	Oklahoma State	84
4	Iowa	76
5	Michigan	62 1/2
6	Missouri	62
7	Cornell	59 1/2
8	Minnesota	53 1/2
9	Rutgers	51 1/2
10	Nebraska	51

== Individual results ==
- Note: Table does not include wrestlebacks
- (H): Individual from hosting U.S. State

Weight	First	Second	Third
125 lbs	#3 Spencer Lee; Iowa	#5 Jack Mueller; Virginia	#1 Sebastian Rivera; Northwestern
133 lbs	#3 Nick Suriano; Rutgers	#1 Daton Fix; Oklahoma State	#2 Stevan Mićić; Michigan
141 lbs	#1 Yianni Diakomihalis; Cornell	#2 Joey McKenna; Ohio State	#5 Jaydin Eierman; Missouri
149 lbs	#1 Anthony Ashnault; Rutgers	#2 Micah Jordan; Ohio State	#6 Austin O'Connor; North Carolina
157 lbs	#1 Jason Nolf; Penn State (H)	#2 Tyler Berger; Nebraska	#4 Alec Pantaleo; Michigan
165 lbs	#8 Mekhi Lewis; Virginia Tech	#2 Vincenzo Joseph; Penn State (H)	#5 Chance Marsteller; Lock Haven (H)
174 lbs	#3 Zahid Valencia; Arizona State	#1 Mark Hall; Penn State (H)	#4 Myles Amine; Michigan
184 lbs	#6 Drew Foster; Northern Iowa	#5 Maxwell Dean; Cornell	#1 Myles Martin; Ohio State
197 lbs	#1 Bo Nickal; Penn State (H)	#2 Kollin Moore; Ohio State	#3 Preston Weigel; Oklahoma State
285 lbs	#2 Anthony Cassar; Penn State (H)	#1 Derek White; Oklahoma State	#3 Gable Steveson; Minnesota
