= Matteo Pellicone Ranking Series 2021 =

- Host city: Rome, Italy
- Dates: March 4–7, 2021
- Stadium: PalaPellicone

The Matteo Pellicone Ranking Series 2021 was a wrestling event held in Ostia, Rome, Italy between 4 and 7 of March 2021. The first United World Wrestling Ranking Series event of the year, it featured multiple World and Olympic Champions, Pan-American Champions, European Champions, Asian Champions and NCAA Champions.

== Medal overview ==
=== Medal table ===
Rank	Nation	Gold	Silver	Bronze	Total
1	Kazakhstan	6	6	12	24
2	United States	6	4	5	15
3	Russia	4	0	3	7
4	Hungary	3	4	4	11
5	Canada	3	1	2	6
6	Turkey	2	6	3	11
7	India	2	1	5	8
8	Italy	1	1	5	7
9	Brazil	1	0	1	2
10	Ecuador	1	0	0	1
11	Bulgaria	0	2	1	3
12	Egypt	0	2	0	2
13	Iran	0	1	0	1
13	Mongolia	0	1	0	1
15	Kuwait	0	0	1	1
15	Romania	0	0	1	1
Totals (16 entries)		29	29	43	101

=== Team ranking ===
Rank	Men's freestyle		Men's Greco-Roman		Women's freestyle	
Rank	Team	Points	Team	Points	Team	Points
1	United States	190	Russia	130	Kazakhstan	129
2	Kazakhstan	175	Kazakhstan	110	Canada	89
3	Turkey	113	Hungary	80	Italy	88
4	India	98	Turkey	76	United States	75
5	Italy	48	India	63	India	69
6	Canada	45	United States	52	Brazil	59
7	Iran	28	Egypt	28	Bulgaria	48
8	Puerto Rico	24	Italy	24	Ecuador	33
9	Mongolia	20	Czech Republic	20	Egypt	20
10	Finland	12	Kuwait	15	Hungary	20

=== Men's freestyle ===
March 6–7

Event	Gold	Silver	Bronze
57 kg	Nurislam Sanayev; Kazakhstan	Nick Suriano; United States	Givi Davidovi; Italy
61 kg	Adlan Askarov; Kazakhstan	Süleyman Atlı; Turkey	Tyler Graff; United States
65 kg	Bajrang Punia; India	Tömör-Ochiryn Tulga; Mongolia	Joseph McKenna; United States
65 kg	Bajrang Punia; India	Tömör-Ochiryn Tulga; Mongolia	Hamza Alaca; Turkey
70 kg	Alec Pantaleo; United States	Daulet Niyazbekov; Kazakhstan	Vishal Kaliraman; India
74 kg	Frank Chamizo; Italy	Jordan Burroughs; United States	Daniyar Kaisanov; Kazakhstan
74 kg	Frank Chamizo; Italy	Jordan Burroughs; United States	Nurkozha Kaipanov; Kazakhstan
79 kg	Galymzhan Usserbayev; Kazakhstan	David McFadden; United States	Muhammet Nuri Kotanoğlu; Turkey
86 kg	Zahid Valencia; United States	Mark Hall; United States	Yeskali Dauletkazy; Kazakhstan
86 kg	Zahid Valencia; United States	Mark Hall; United States	Myles Martin; United States
92 kg	Selim Yaşar; Turkey	Erhan Yaylacı; Turkey	Elkhan Assadov; Kazakhstan
97 kg	Kollin Moore; United States	Alireza Karimi; Iran	Hayden Zillmer; United States
97 kg	Kollin Moore; United States	Alireza Karimi; Iran	Alisher Yergali; Kazakhstan
125 kg	Amar Dhesi; Canada	Yusup Batirmurzaev; Kazakhstan	Tony Nelson; United States

=== Men's Greco-Roman ===
March 4–5

Event	Gold	Silver	Bronze
55 kg	Viktor Vedernikov; Russia	Khorlan Zhakansha; Kazakhstan	Arjun Halakurki; India
60 kg	Emin Sefershaev; Russia	Ahmet Uyar; Turkey	Krisztian Kecskemeti; Hungary
60 kg	Emin Sefershaev; Russia	Ahmet Uyar; Turkey	Zhanserik Sarsenbiyev; Kazakhstan
63 kg	Aidos Sultangali; Kazakhstan	Sultan Assetuly; Kazakhstan	Mohammed Alajmi; Kuwait
63 kg	Aidos Sultangali; Kazakhstan	Sultan Assetuly; Kazakhstan	Neeraj Neeraj; India
67 kg	Meirzhan Shermakhanbet; Kazakhstan	Krasznai Máté; Hungary	Nazir Abdullaev; Russia
67 kg	Meirzhan Shermakhanbet; Kazakhstan	Krasznai Máté; Hungary	Almat Kebispayev; Kazakhstan
72 kg	Róbert Fritsch; Hungary	Selçuk Can; Turkey	Kuldeep MALIK; India
77 kg	Zoltán Lévai; Hungary	Yunus Emre Başar; Turkey	Askhat Dilmukhamedov; Kazakhstan
77 kg	Zoltán Lévai; Hungary	Yunus Emre Başar; Turkey	Tamerlan Shadukayev; Kazakhstan
82 kg	Adlan Akiev; Russia	Burhan Akbudak; Turkey	Tamás Lévai; Hungary
82 kg	Adlan Akiev; Russia	Burhan Akbudak; Turkey	László Szabó; Hungary
87 kg	Istvan Takacs; Hungary	Losonczi David; Hungary	Viktor Lőrincz; Hungary
87 kg	Istvan Takacs; Hungary	Losonczi David; Hungary	Bekkhan Ozdoev; Russia
97 kg	Musa Evloev; Russia	Erik Szilvássy; Hungary	Cenk İldem; Turkey
97 kg	Musa Evloev; Russia	Erik Szilvássy; Hungary	Olzhas Syrlybay; Kazakhstan
130 kg	Rıza Kayaalp; Turkey	Abdellatif Mohamed; Egypt	Naveen Naveen; India
130 kg	Rıza Kayaalp; Turkey	Abdellatif Mohamed; Egypt	Zurabi Gedekhauri; Russia

=== Women's freestyle ===
March 4–5

Event	Gold	Silver	Bronze
50 kg	Victoria Anthony; United States	Miglena Selishka; Bulgaria	Alina Vuc; Romania
53 kg	Vinesh Phogat; India	Diana Weicker; Canada	Samantha Stewart; Canada
55 kg	Jacqueline Mollocana; Ecuador	Aisha Ualishan; Kazakhstan	Ambra Campagna; Italy
57 kg	Giullia Penalber; Brazil	Sarita Mor; India	Emma Tissina; Kazakhstan
57 kg	Giullia Penalber; Brazil	Sarita Mor; India	Francesca Indelicato; Italy
59 kg	Abigail Nette; United States	Diana Kayumova; Kazakhstan	Rebecca De Leo; Italy
62 kg	Michelle Fazzari; Canada	Marianna Sastin; Hungary	Laís Nunes; Brazil
65 kg	Gaukhar Mukatay; Kazakhstan	Veronica Braschi; Italy	Only two competitors
68 kg	Tamyra Mensah-Stock; United States	Mimi Hristova; Bulgaria	Sofiya Georgieva; Bulgaria
68 kg	Tamyra Mensah-Stock; United States	Mimi Hristova; Bulgaria	Olivia Di Bacco; Canada
76 kg	Erica Wiebe; Canada	Samar Amer; Egypt	Elmira Syzdykova; Kazakhstan
76 kg	Erica Wiebe; Canada	Samar Amer; Egypt	Enrica Rinaldi; Italy
