= Alex Dieringer =

American wrestler (born 1993)

Personal information
- Full name: Alex David Dieringer
- Born: June 6, 1993 (age 33) Port Washington, Wisconsin, U.S.
- Height: 5 ft 9 in (175 cm)
- Weight: 190 lb (86 kg)

Sport
- Country: United States
- Sport: Wrestling
- Events: Freestyle and Folkstyle
- College team: Oklahoma State
- Club: Cliff Keen Wrestling Club; Titan Mercury Wrestling Club
- Coached by: John Smith
Medal record
Men's freestyle wrestling
Representing the United States
Pan American Championships
Bronze medal – third place	2020 Ottawa	86 kg
Yasar Dogu Tournament
Gold medal – first place	2019 Istanbul	79 kg
Ivan Yarygin Golden Grand Prix
Bronze medal – third place	2019 Krasnoyarsk	79 kg
Dan Kolov & Nikola Petrov Tournament
Gold medal – first place	2024 Sofia	86 kg
US National Championships
Gold medal – first place	2019 Las Vegas	79 kg
Silver medal – second place	2018 Las Vegas	79 kg
Bronze medal – third place	2017 Las Vegas	74 kg
Bronze medal – third place	2019 Fort Worth (SN)	86 kg
Men's collegiate wrestling
Representing the Oklahoma State Cowboys
NCAA Division I Championships
Gold medal – first place	2014 Oklahoma City	157 lb
Gold medal – first place	2015 St. Louis	165 lb
Gold medal – first place	2016 New York	165 lb
Bronze medal – third place	2013 Des Moines	157 lb
Big 12 Championships
Gold medal – first place	2013 Stillwater	157 lb
Gold medal – first place	2014 Norman	157 lb
Gold medal – first place	2015 Ames	165 lb
Gold medal – first place	2016 Kansas City	165 lb

Alex David Dieringer (born June 6, 1993) is an American freestyle wrestler and graduated folkstyle wrestler. In freestyle, he has had success in both the international and national circuit, claiming medals from tournaments such as the Bill Farrell Memorial, the Ivan Yarygin Grand Prix, the US Open, among others. As a folkstyle wrestler, Dieringer was a three-time NCAA Division I national champion, 2016 Dan Hodge Trophy winner, four-time All-American, and four-time Big 12 Conference champion at Oklahoma State University.

== Freestyle record ==
Senior Freestyle Matches
Res.	Record	Opponent	Score	Date	Event	Location
2024 World Team Trials DNP at 79 kg
Loss		(United States) David Carr	FF	September 14, 2024	2024 World Team Trials	(United States) Omaha, Nebraska
Loss	108-28	(United States) Jordan Burroughs	4-7	September 14, 2024	2024 World Team Trials	(United States) Omaha, Nebraska
Win	108-27	(United States) Evan Wick	7–1	September 14, 2024	2024 World Team Trials	(United States) Omaha, Nebraska
Win	107-27	(United States) Noah Mulvaney	TF 10–0	September 14, 2024	2024 World Team Trials	(United States) Omaha, Nebraska
2024 U.S. Olympic Team Trials 4th at 86 kg
Loss	106-27	(United States) Trent Hidlay	4-5	April 19, 2024	2024 U.S. Olympic Team Trials	(United States) State College, Pennsylvania
Win	106-26	(United States) Chance Marsteller	3–2	April 19, 2024	2024 U.S. Olympic Team Trials	(United States) State College, Pennsylvania
Win	105-26	(United States) Evan Wick	Fall	April 19, 2024	2024 U.S. Olympic Team Trials	(United States) State College, Pennsylvania
Loss	104-26	(United States) Aaron Brooks	4-8	April 19, 2024	2024 U.S. Olympic Team Trials	(United States) State College, Pennsylvania
Win	104-25	(United States) Mark Hall	5–2	April 19, 2024	2024 U.S. Olympic Team Trials	(United States) State College, Pennsylvania
2024 Dan Kolov & Nikola Petrov Tournament (gold) at 86kg
Win	103-25	(Ukraine) Mukhammed Aliev	TF 10–0	March 7, 2024	2024 Dan Kolov & Nikola Petrov Tournament	Sofia, Bulgaria
Win	102-25	(Ukraine) Vladyslav Prus	Fall	March 7, 2024	2024 Dan Kolov & Nikola Petrov Tournament	Sofia, Bulgaria
Win	101-25	(Bulgaria) Slavi Stamenov	Fall	March 7, 2024	2024 Dan Kolov & Nikola Petrov Tournament	Sofia, Bulgaria
Win	100-25	(Latvia) Alans Amirovs	TF 13–2	March 7, 2024	2024 Dan Kolov & Nikola Petrov Tournament	Sofia, Bulgaria
2023 Senior Nationals (gold) at 86 kg
Win	99-25	(United States) Mark Hall	6–0	December 15, 2023	2023 Senior Nationals	(United States) Fort Worth, Texas
Win		(United States) Darren McFadden	Injury Default	December 15, 2023	2023 Senior Nationals	(United States) Fort Worth, Texas
Win	98-25	(United States) Evan Wick	5–2	December 15, 2023	2023 Senior Nationals	(United States) Fort Worth, Texas
Win	97-25	(United States) Andrew Morgan	TF 10–0	December 15, 2023	2023 Senior Nationals	(United States) Fort Worth, Texas
2023 Bill Farrell Memorial International (silver) at 86kg
Loss	96-25	(United States) Trent Hidlay	1-2	November 17, 2023	2023 Bill Farrell Memorial International	(United States) New York City
Win	96-24	(United States) Connor Mirasola	9–3	November 17, 2023	2023 Bill Farrell Memorial International	(United States) New York City
Win	95-24	(United States) Marcus Coleman	TF 11–0	November 17, 2023	2023 Bill Farrell Memorial International	(United States) New York City
Win	94-24	(Israel) Mitch Finesilver	TF 10–0	November 17, 2023	2023 Bill Farrell Memorial International	(United States) New York City
Win	93-24	(Peru) Jesús Augusto Landa Céspedes	Fall	November 17, 2023	2023 Bill Farrell Memorial International	(United States) New York City
Win	92-24	(United States) David McFadden	2–2	June 10, 2023	2023 Final X Newark – True Third Match – 79 kg	(United States) Newark, New Jersey
2023 US Open (silver) at 79 kg
Loss	91-24	(United States) Chance Marsteller	2-3	April 26, 2023	2023 US Open	(United States) Las Vegas, Nevada
Win	91-23	(United States) Carter Starocci	7–1	April 26, 2023	2023 US Open	(United States) Las Vegas, Nevada
Win	90-23	(United States) Taylor Lujan	7–0	April 26, 2023	2023 US Open	(United States) Las Vegas, Nevada
Win	89-23	(United States) Carson Kharchla	5–0	April 26, 2023	2023 US Open	(United States) Las Vegas, Nevada
Win		(United States) Tallin Johnson	Injury Default	April 26, 2023	2023 US Open	(United States) Las Vegas, Nevada
2022 World Team Trials DNP at 79 kg
Loss	88-23	(United States) Carter Starocci	1-5	May 21, 2022	2022 World Team Trials	(United States) Coralville, Iowa
Loss	88-22	(United States) Vincenzo Joseph	2-3	May 21, 2022	2022 World Team Trials	(United States) Coralville, Iowa
Win	88-21	(United States) Isaiah Martinez	TF 14–3	May 21, 2022	2022 World Team Trials	(United States) Coralville, Iowa
2022 US Open (bronze) at 79kg
Win	87-21	(United States) Taylor Lujan	Fall	April 27, 2022	2022 US Open	(United States) Las Vegas, Nevada
Win	86-21	(United States) Chance Marsteller	4–0	April 27, 2022	2022 US Open	(United States) Las Vegas, Nevada
Win	85-21	(United States) Evan Wick	Fall	April 27, 2022	2022 US Open	(United States) Las Vegas, Nevada
Win	84-21	(United States) Nick Incontrera	TF 11–0	April 27, 2022	2022 US Open	(United States) Las Vegas, Nevada
Loss	83-21	(United States) Vincenzo Joseph	6-7	April 27, 2022	2022 US Open	(United States) Las Vegas, Nevada
Win	83-20	(United States) Cole Hernandez	Fall	April 27, 2022	2022 US Open	(United States) Las Vegas, Nevada
Win	82-20	(United States) Kyle Terry	Fall	April 27, 2022	2022 US Open	(United States) Las Vegas, Nevada
Win	81–20	(United States) Isaiah Martinez	4–1	March 16, 2022	Rudis+: Snyder vs. Cox	(United States) Detroit, Michigan
2022 Ivan Yarygin Golden Grand Prix 5th at 79 kg
Loss	80–20	(Russia) Gadzhi Nabiev	2–5	January 27–30, 2022	Golden Grand Prix Ivan Yarygin 2022	Krasnoyarsk, Russia
Loss	80–19	(Russia) Radik Valiev	2–5	January 27–30, 2022	Golden Grand Prix Ivan Yarygin 2022	Krasnoyarsk, Russia
Win	80–18	(Russia) Dmitrii Kuprin	9–5	January 27–30, 2022	Golden Grand Prix Ivan Yarygin 2022	Krasnoyarsk, Russia
Win	79–18	(Russia) Magomed Magomaev	Fall	January 27–30, 2022	Golden Grand Prix Ivan Yarygin 2022	Krasnoyarsk, Russia
Win	78–18	(Russia) Alik Badtiev	Fall	January 27–30, 2022	Golden Grand Prix Ivan Yarygin 2022	Krasnoyarsk, Russia
2021 US World Team Trials (silver) at 79 kg
Loss	77–18	(United States) Jordan Burroughs	3–4	September 12, 2021	2021 US World Team Trials	(United States) Lincoln, Nebraska
Loss	77–17	(United States) Jordan Burroughs	5–10	September 12, 2021	2021 US World Team Trials	(United States) Lincoln, Nebraska
Win	77–16	(United States) Isaiah Martinez	6–1	September 11, 2021	2021 US World Team Trials	(United States) Lincoln, Nebraska
Win	76–16	(United States) David McFadden	3–1	September 11, 2021	2021 US World Team Trials	(United States) Lincoln, Nebraska
Win	75–16	(United States) Josh Shields	9–1	September 11, 2021	2021 US World Team Trials	(United States) Lincoln, Nebraska
Loss	74-16	(United States) Bo Nickal	1-1	September 19, 2020	NLWC I	(United States) State College, Pennsylvania
2020 Pan American Championships (bronze) at 86 kg
Win	74-15	(Colombia) Carlos Izquierdo	TF 11-1	March 6–9, 2020	2020 Pan American Wrestling Championships	Ottawa, Canada
Loss	73-15	(Cuba) Yurieski Torreblanca	1-2	March 6–9, 2020	2020 Pan American Wrestling Championships	Ottawa, Canada
Win	73-14	(Puerto Rico) Ethan Ramos	9-2	March 6–9, 2020	2020 Pan American Wrestling Championships	Ottawa, Canada
Win	72-14	(Venezuela) Pedro Ceballos	Fall	March 6–9, 2020	2020 Pan American Wrestling Championships	Ottawa, Canada
2020 Matteo Pellicone RS (gold) at 86kg
NC	71-14	(United States) Zahid Valencia	NC (overturned)	January 15–18, 2020	2020 Matteo Pellicone Ranking Series	Rome, Italy
Win	71-14	(United States) Pat Downey	3-2	January 15–18, 2020	2020 Matteo Pellicone Ranking Series	Rome, Italy
Win	70-14	(Uzbekistan) Rashid Kurbanov	8-4	January 15–18, 2020	2020 Matteo Pellicone Ranking Series	Rome, Italy
Win	69-14	(Ukraine) Illia Archaia	9-0	January 15–18, 2020	2020 Matteo Pellicone Ranking Series	Rome, Italy
2019 US Nationals (bronze) at 86 kg
Win	68-14	(United States) Brett Pfarr	TF 10-0	December 20–22, 2019	2019 US Senior Nationals - US Olympic Trials Qualifier	(United States) Fort Worth, Texas
Win	67-14	(United States) Sammy Brooks	TF 10-0	December 20–22, 2019	2019 US Senior Nationals - US Olympic Trials Qualifier	(United States) Fort Worth, Texas
Loss	66-14	(United States) Myles Martin	4-6	December 20–22, 2019	2019 US Senior Nationals - US Olympic Trials Qualifier	(United States) Fort Worth, Texas
Win	66-13	(United States) Brett Pfarr	2-1	December 20–22, 2019	2019 US Senior Nationals - US Olympic Trials Qualifier	(United States) Fort Worth, Texas
Win	65-13	(United States) Ryan Loder	TF 10-0	December 20–22, 2019	2019 US Senior Nationals - US Olympic Trials Qualifier	(United States) Fort Worth, Texas
Win	64-13	(United States) Willie Miklus	3-0	December 20–22, 2019	2019 US Senior Nationals - US Olympic Trials Qualifier	(United States) Fort Worth, Texas
2019 Bill Farrell International (gold) at 86 kg
Win	63-13	(United States) Myles Martin	7-2	November 15–16, 2019	2019 Bill Farrell Memorial International	(United States) New York
Win	62-13	(Ukraine) Illia Archaia	7-1	November 15–16, 2019	2019 Bill Farrell Memorial International	(United States) New York
Win	61-13	(Lebanon) Domenic Abounader	6-2	November 15–16, 2019	2019 Bill Farrell Memorial International	(United States) New York
Win	60-13	(United States) Ryan Loder	TF 10-0	November 15–16, 2019	2019 Bill Farrell Memorial International	(United States) New York
2019 US World Team Trials (silver) at 79 kg
Loss	59-13	(United States) Kyle Dake	2-4	August 17, 2019	2019 Final X Special Wrestle-off: Dake vs. Dieringer	(United States) Austin, Texas
Loss	59-12	(United States) Kyle Dake	2-3	August 17, 2019	2019 Final X Special Wrestle-off: Dake vs. Dieringer	(United States) Austin, Texas
2019 Yaşar Doğu (gold) at 79 kg
Win	59-11	(Slovakia) Akhsarbek Gulaev	4-1	July 11–14, 2019	2019 Grand Prix Yaşar Doğu	Istanbul, Turkey
Win	58-11	(Iran) Bahman Teymouri	5-0	July 11–14, 2019	2019 Grand Prix Yaşar Doğu	Istanbul, Turkey
Win	57-11	(Azerbaijan) Abubakar Abakarov	TF 10-0	July 11–14, 2019	2019 Grand Prix Yaşar Doğu	Istanbul, Turkey
Win	56-11	(United States) Zahid Valencia	TF 12-2	May 17–19, 2019	2019 US World Team Trials Challenge	(United States) Raleigh, North Carolina
Win	55-11	(United States) Zahid Valencia	TF 12-1	May 17–19, 2019	2019 US World Team Trials Challenge	(United States) Raleigh, North Carolina
2019 US Open (gold) at 79 kg
Win	54-11	(United States) Chance Marsteller	TF 10-0	April 24–27, 2019	2019 US Open National Championships	(United States) Las Vegas, Nevada
Win	53-11	(United States) Geno Morelli	TF 10-0	April 24–27, 2019	2019 US Open National Championships	(United States) Las Vegas, Nevada
Win	52-11	(United States) Matt Finesilver	TF 12-0	April 24–27, 2019	2019 US Open National Championships	(United States) Las Vegas, Nevada
Win	51-11	(United States) Ryan Cone	TF 10-0	April 24–27, 2019	2019 US Open National Championships	(United States) Las Vegas, Nevada
Win	50-11	(United States) Joseph Castellino	TF 10-0	April 24–27, 2019	2019 US Open National Championships	(United States) Las Vegas, Nevada
2019 Dan Kolov - Nikola Petrov (gold) at 79 kg
Win	49-11	(Romania) Omaraskhab Nazhmudinov	TF 10-0	February 28 - March 3, 2019	2019 Alexander Medved Prizes	Ruse, Bulgaria
Win	48-11	(Georgia (country)) Nika Kentchadze	5-1	February 28 - March 3, 2019	2019 Alexander Medved Prizes	Ruse, Bulgaria
Win	47-11	(Serbia) Zaur Efendiev	TF 10-0	February 28 - March 3, 2019	2019 Alexander Medved Prizes	Ruse, Bulgaria
Win	46-11	(Turkey) Muhammet Kotanoğlu	TF 11-0	February 28 - March 3, 2019	2019 Alexander Medved Prizes	Ruse, Bulgaria
2019 Ivan Yarygin Grand Prix (bronze) at 79 kg
Win	45-11	(Russia) Alan Zaseev	FF	January 24–27, 2019	Golden Grand Prix Ivan Yarygin 2019	Krasnoyarsk, Russia
Loss	44-11	(Russia) Akhmed Gadzhimagomedov	2-5	January 24–27, 2019	Golden Grand Prix Ivan Yarygin 2019	Krasnoyarsk, Russia
Win	44-10	(Russia) Alan Zaseev	7-3	January 24–27, 2019	Golden Grand Prix Ivan Yarygin 2019	Krasnoyarsk, Russia
Win	43-10	(China) Zeping Lin	TF 13-0	January 24–27, 2019	Golden Grand Prix Ivan Yarygin 2019	Krasnoyarsk, Russia
2018 Alexander Medved Prizes (gold) at 79 kg
Win	42-10	(France) Dovletmyrat Orazgylyjov	TF 16-5	September 14–16, 2018	2018 Alexander Medved Prizes	Minsk, Belarus
Win	41-10	(Ukraine) Oleksiy Sherbak	10-1	September 14–16, 2018	2018 Alexander Medved Prizes	Minsk, Belarus
Win	40-10	(Colombia) Santiago Martinez Restrepo	TF 10-0	September 14–16, 2018	2018 Alexander Medved Prizes	Minsk, Belarus
Win	39-10	(Ukraine) Rustam Dudayev	FF (9-2)	September 14–16, 2018	2018 Alexander Medved Prizes	Minsk, Belarus
2018 US World Team Trials (bronze) at 79 kg
Loss	38-10	(United States) Zahid Valencia	1-5	May 18–20, 2018	2018 US World Team Trials Challenge	(United States) Rochester, Minnesota
Loss	38-9	(United States) Zahid Valencia	0-7	May 18–20, 2018	2018 US World Team Trials Challenge	(United States) Rochester, Minnesota
Win	38-8	(United States) Nate Jackson	TF 12-2	May 18–20, 2018	2018 US World Team Trials Challenge	(United States) Rochester, Minnesota
2018 US Open (silver) at 79 kg
Loss	37-8	(United States) Kyle Dake	5-5	April 24–28, 2018	2018 US Open National Championships	(United States) Las Vegas, Nevada
Win	37-7	(United States) Michael Evans	TF 11-0	April 24–28, 2018	2018 US Open National Championships	(United States) Las Vegas, Nevada
Win	36-7	(United States) Nate Jackson	TF 10-0	April 24–28, 2018	2018 US Open National Championships	(United States) Las Vegas, Nevada
Win	35-7	(United States) Hayden Harris	TF 10-0	April 24–28, 2018	2018 US Open National Championships	(United States) Las Vegas, Nevada
2018 Bill Farrell International (gold) at 79 kg
Win	34-7	(France) Zelimkhan Khadjiev	Fall	March 30–31, 2018	2018 Bill Farrell Memorial International	(United States) New York
Win	33-7	(Kazakhstan) Daniyar Kaisanov	TF 11-0	March 30–31, 2018	2018 Bill Farrell Memorial International	(United States) New York
Win	32-7	(United States) Kevin Dufresne	TF 12-1	March 30–31, 2018	2018 Bill Farrell Memorial International	(United States) New York
2018 Ukrainian Memorial International (gold) at 79 kg
Win	31-7	(Azerbaijan) Jabrayil Hasanov	7-4	February 23–25, 2018	XXII Outstanding Ukrainian Wrestlers and Coaches Memorial	Kyiv, Ukraine
Win	30-7	(Japan) Yajuro Yamasaki	4-2	February 23–25, 2018	XXII Outstanding Ukrainian Wrestlers and Coaches Memorial	Kyiv, Ukraine
Win	29-7	(Georgia (country)) Jumber Kvelashvili	TF 11-0	February 23–25, 2018	XXII Outstanding Ukrainian Wrestlers and Coaches Memorial	Kyiv, Ukraine
Win	28-7	(Iran) Omid Hassan Tabar Jelodar	TF 10-0	February 23–25, 2018	XXII Outstanding Ukrainian Wrestlers and Coaches Memorial	Kyiv, Ukraine
Win	27-7	(Georgia (country)) Jakov Makarashvili	TF 10-0	February 23–25, 2018	XXII Outstanding Ukrainian Wrestlers and Coaches Memorial	Kyiv, Ukraine
2017 US World Team Trials (bronze) at 74 kg
Win	26-7	(United States) Isaiah Martinez	4-2	June 9, 2017	2017 US World Team Trials Challenge	(United States) Lincoln, Nebraska
Loss	25-7	(United States) Kyle Dake	1-2	June 9, 2017	2017 US World Team Trials Challenge	(United States) Lincoln, Nebraska
Win	25-6	(United States) Chance Marsteller	TF 10-0	June 9, 2017	2017 US World Team Trials Challenge	(United States) Lincoln, Nebraska
2017 US Open (bronze) at 74 kg
Win	24-7	(United States) Anthony Valencia	Fall	April 26–29, 2017	2017 US Open National Championships	(United States) Las Vegas, Nevada
Win	23-7	(United States) Chris Perry	3-2	April 26–29, 2017	2017 US Open National Championships	(United States) Las Vegas, Nevada
Loss	22-7	(United States) Kyle Dake	0-3	April 26–29, 2017	2017 US Open National Championships	(United States) Las Vegas, Nevada
Win	22-6	(United States) Anthony Valencia	11-9	April 26–29, 2017	2017 US Open National Championships	(United States) Las Vegas, Nevada
Win	21-6	(United States) Ed Havlovic	TF 12-0	April 26–29, 2017	2017 US Open National Championships	(United States) Las Vegas, Nevada
Win	20-6	(United States) Chance Marsteller	5-3	April 26–29, 2017	2017 US Open National Championships	(United States) Las Vegas, Nevada
2017 Ukrainian Memorial International (bronze) at 74 kg
Win	19-6	(Ukraine) Aleksey Shcherbak	Fall	March 3–4, 2017	XXI Outstanding Ukrainian Wrestlers and Coaches Memorial	Kyiv, Ukraine
Loss	18-6	(Iran) Reza Afzali	5-7	March 3–4, 2017	XXI Outstanding Ukrainian Wrestlers and Coaches Memorial	Kyiv, Ukraine
Win	18-5	(Bulgaria) Svetoslav Dimitrov	TF 11-1	March 3–4, 2017	XXI Outstanding Ukrainian Wrestlers and Coaches Memorial	Kyiv, Ukraine
Win	17-5	(Ukraine) Rustam Rasuev	Fall	March 3–4, 2017	XXI Outstanding Ukrainian Wrestlers and Coaches Memorial	Kyiv, Ukraine
2017 Paris Grand Prix (silver) at 74 kg
Loss	16-5	(United States) Kyle Dake	TF 0-10	January 28–29, 2017	2017 Grand Prix of Paris	Paris, France
Win	16-4	(Germany) Kubilay Çakıcı	TF 11-1	January 28–29, 2017	2017 Grand Prix of Paris	Paris, France
Win	15-4	(France) Henri Selenius	9-0	January 28–29, 2017	2017 Grand Prix of Paris	Paris, France
2016 World Clubs Cup (gold) as TMWC
Win	14-4	(Iran) Reza Afzali	6-4	November 30 - December 1, 2016	2016 World Wrestling Clubs Cup - Men's freestyle	Kharkiv, Ukraine
Win	13-4	(Ukraine) Giya Chikladze	TF 10-0	November 30 - December 1, 2016	2016 World Wrestling Clubs Cup - Men's freestyle	Kharkiv, Ukraine
Win	12-4	(Georgia (country)) Avtandil Kentchadze	TF 13-0	November 30 - December 1, 2016	2016 World Wrestling Clubs Cup - Men's freestyle	Kharkiv, Ukraine
Win	11-4	(Ukraine) Ruslan Rychko	TF 10-0	November 30 - December 1, 2016	2016 World Wrestling Clubs Cup - Men's freestyle	Kharkiv, Ukraine
2016 Bill Farrell International (gold) at 74 kg
Win	10-4	(Uzbekistan) Bekzod Abdurakhmonov	8-2	November 10–12, 2016	2016 Bill Farrell Memorial International	(United States) Iowa City, Iowa
Win	9-4	(United States) Chance Marsteller	TF 10-0	November 10–12, 2016	2016 Bill Farrell Memorial International	(United States) Iowa City, Iowa
Win	8-4	(United States) Quinton Godley	TF 10-0	November 10–12, 2016	2016 Bill Farrell Memorial International	(United States) Iowa City, Iowa
2016 International Cup 7th at 74 kg
Loss	7-4	(Russia) Gadzhi Gadzhiev	4-4	October 14–16, 2016	2016 International Cup	Khasavyurt, Russia
Win	7-3	(Russia) Rasul Shapiev	Fall	October 14–16, 2016	2016 International Cup	Khasavyurt, Russia
2016 World Cup 4th as Team USA
Win	6-3	(Georgia (country)) Jakob Makarashvili	10-1	June 11–12, 2016	2016 Wrestling World Cup – Men's freestyle	(United States) Los Angeles, California
Win	5-3	(Azerbaijan) Ashraf Aliyev	8-0	June 11–12, 2016	2016 Wrestling World Cup – Men's freestyle	(United States) Los Angeles, California
Loss	4-3	(Iran) Hassan Yazdani	TF 0-10	June 11–12, 2016	2016 Wrestling World Cup – Men's freestyle	(United States) Los Angeles, California
Loss	4-2	(India) Parveen Rana	4-5	June 11–12, 2016	2016 Wrestling World Cup – Men's freestyle	(United States) Los Angeles, California
2016 US Olympic Team Trials (bronze) at 74 kg
Win	4-1	(United States) Nick Marable	2-1	April 22, 2016	2016 US Olympic Team Trials Challenge	(United States) Iowa City, Iowa
Win	3-1	(United States) Adam Hall	6-3	April 22, 2016	2016 US Olympic Team Trials Challenge	(United States) Iowa City, Iowa
Win	2-1	(United States) Logan Massa	TF 10-0	April 22, 2016	2016 US Olympic Team Trials Challenge	(United States) Iowa City, Iowa
Loss	1-1	(United States) Andrew Howe	2-5	April 22, 2016	2016 US Olympic Team Trials Challenge	(United States) Iowa City, Iowa
Win	1-0	(United States) Adam Hall	10-4	April 22, 2016	2016 US Olympic Team Trials Challenge	(United States) Iowa City, Iowa
