= Rutgers Scarlet Knights wrestling =

Wrestling team of Rutgers University

- University: Rutgers University-New Brunswick
- Head coach: Scott Goodale (17th season)
- Assistant coach: Anthony Ashnault
- Conference: Big Ten
- Location: New Brunswick, NJ
- Arena: Rutgers Athletic Center (RAC) (capacity: 8,000)
- Nickname: Scarlet Knights
- Colors: Scarlet

The Rutgers Scarlet Knights wrestling team represents Rutgers University of New Brunswick, New Jersey. The squad is coached by Scott Goodale, who is a 1995 graduate of Lock Haven University. He came to Rutgers from the high school ranks, where he was previously the head coach at Jackson Memorial High School in Jackson, New Jersey, and coached four state champions.

In 2019, Nick Suriano and Anthony Ashnault became the first NCAA champions for Rutgers.

Rutgers has had All-Americans in each of the last five seasons. Anthony Ashnault (141-149) became the first four-time All-American in program history when he finished first at the 2019 national championships in Pittsburgh. The program has had two or more All-Americans for four consecutive years: 2016, 2017, 2018 and 2019.

Founded in 2011, the Scarlet Knights Wrestling Club, Inc. (SKWC) is an independent, non-profit charitable organization with a mission to promote amateur wrestling in the United States. The SKWC is recognized as a U.S. Olympic Regional Training Center site. With this designation, the SKWC sponsors resident athletes to live and train in the New Brunswick area under the Club’s outstanding coaching staff. The SKWC also works to support the Rutgers University Wrestling program with golf outings, a 'pin pool', banquets, and post-event socials. In 2011, the IRS approved SKWC as a tax-exempt, charitable, educational organization in accordance with IRS code Section 501(c)3.

Coach Goodale runs the Scarlet Knights Wrestling Camp, summer wrestling camps for high school students, youth and teams in New Jersey and the adjacent states of New York and Pennsylvania, featuring Rutgers wrestling coaches and athletes as staff. It is unaffiliated with Rutgers University and the Scarlet Knights Wrestling Club.

== Current coaching staff ==
- Head coach: Scott Goodale (Lock Haven '95)
- Assistant coach: Anthony Ashnault (Rutgers '19)
- Director of Operations: Micheal Simmons (Rutgers '16)
- Vol. Assistant Coach: Joe Pollard (Rider)
- Vol. Assistant Coach: Klye Kiss (University of North Carolina '12)

== All-Americans ==
Name	Year	Weight Class	Place	NCAA Location	High School
Ray Vohden	1952	177	4th	University of Iowa	Springfield Regional, New Jersey
Emil Perona	1952	157	4th	University of Iowa	Newton, New Jersey
George Mulligan	1955	147	4th	Cornell University	Bound Brook, New Jersey
Mike Leta	1960	137	3rd	University of Maryland	Plainfield, New Jersey
Ed Scharer	1964	UNL	6th	Cornell University	Dover, New Jersey
Tony Surage	1980	150	7th	Oregon State University	Passaic Valley, New Jersey
Tony Surage	1983	142	7th	Oklahoma City, OK	Passaic Valley, New Jersey
Tom Tanis	2002	184	4th	Albany, NY	Jefferson, New Jersey
Anthony Perrotti	2014	157	8th	Oklahoma City, OK	West Essex, New Jersey
Anthony Ashnault	2015	141	8th	St. Louis, MO	South Plainfield, New Jersey
Anthony Ashnault	2016	141	4th	New York City, NY	South Plainfield, New Jersey
Anthony Perrotti	2016	165	8th	New York City, NY	West Essex, New Jersey
Anthony Ashnault	2017	141	6th	St. Louis, MO	South Plainfield, New Jersey
Kenny Theobold	2017	149	7th	St. Louis, MO	Toms River South, New Jersey
Nick Suriano	2018	125	2nd	Cleveland, OH	Bergen Catholic, New Jersey
Scott DelVecchio	2018	133	6th	Cleveland, OH	South Plainfield, New Jersey
Nick Suriano	2019	133	1st	Pittsburgh, PA	Bergen Catholic, New Jersey
Anthony Ashnault	2019	149	1st	Pittsburgh, PA	South Plainfield, New Jersey
Sebastian Rivera	2021	141	4th	St. Louis, MO	Christian Brothers Academy, New Jersey
John Poznanski	2021	184	4th	St. Louis, MO	Colonia, New Jersey
Jackson Turley	2021	174	8th	St. Louis, MO	St. Christopher's, Virginia
Sebastian Rivera	2022	141	3rd	Detroit, MI	Christian Brothers Academy, New Jersey
Greg Bulsak	2022	197	8th	Detroit, MI	South Park, Pennsylvania
Dylan Shawver	2024	133	7th	Kansas City, MO	Lorain, Ohio
Yaraslau Slavikouski	2024	HWT	7th	Kansas City, MO	Rechitsa, Belarus

== International wrestling competition ==
Name	RU Class	Year	Weight Class	Place	Style	Location
Laurence Larry Colton	1985	2009	55 kg	4th	Freestyle	Maccabiah Games - Israel
Laurence Larry Colton	1985	2009	55 kg	4th	Greco-Roman	Maccabiah Games - Israel
Anthony Ashnault	2018	2014	65 kg	10th	Freestyle	World University Championship - Hungary
Moshe (MB) Klyman	2008	2017	97 kg	3rd	Freestyle	Maccabiah Games - Israel
Richie Lewis	2018	2017	70 kg	1st	Freestyle	Under-23 World Championships - Poland
Anthony Ashnault	2018	2019	70 kg	1st	Freestyle	Pan American Championships - Argentina
Sebastian Rivera	2022	2023	65 kg	2nd	Freestyle	2023 World Championships-Belgrade

== 2025 gambling scandal controversy ==
On November 13, former Rutgers wrestlers Michael Cetta, who was previously an NJSIAA state champion for New Jersey, and Nicholas Raimo were indicted charged with racketeering (1st degree), conspiracy (2nd degree), promoting gambling by bookmaking (3rd degree), possession of gambling records (3rd degree) and money laundering by promoting (1st degree) which involved their participation in a major illegal sport gambling ring affiliated with members of the Lucchese crime family.
