= Technical fall =

Point-based victory condition in wrestling

In amateur wrestling, a technical fall, or technical superiority, is a victory condition satisfied by outscoring one's opponent by a specified number of points. It is a mercy rule. It is informally abbreviated to "tech" as both a noun and verb.

== High school and college ==
In scholastic wrestling, a differential of fifteen points ends a match regardless of when it is reached. In collegiate wrestling, a pin may still be awarded as a continuation of a near fall even if the necessary point differential is reached while achieving it.

== United World Wrestling ==
Under the old rules of freestyle and Greco-Roman wrestling, a ten-point differential ended the match.

Under the rules adopted in 2004–05 by United World Wrestling (then known as FILA), the international styles moved to a three-period system similar to a best of three series; the technical fall won only the period, as opposed to a pin, which ends the match entirely. However, if a wrestler won two out of three periods in this way, he was then the winner of the match by technical superiority. The international styles moved to a two-period system in 2006, with scoring continuing to accumulate throughout the match until its end. Accordingly, a technical fall was once again awarded once a specified point differential was reached.

As of 2019, UWW rules specify that a technical fall, officially termed "technical superiority", occurs once a wrestler leads by 10 points in freestyle or 8 points in Greco-Roman.
