= Zahid Valencia =

American wrestler (born 1997)

Personal information
- Full name: Zahid Valencia
- Born: May 11, 1997 (age 29) Pico Rivera, California, U.S.
- Height: 6 ft 1 in (1.85 m)
- Weight: 86 kg (190 lb)

Sport
- Country: United States
- Sport: Wrestling
- Events: Freestyle and Folkstyle
- College team: Arizona State
- Club: Scarlet Knights Wrestling Club (formerly); Sunkist Kids Wrestling Club (formerly); Sun Devil Wrestling Club (formerly); Cowboy Regional Training Center
- Coached by: David Taylor; Zeke Jones (formerly)
Medal record
Men's freestyle wrestling
Representing the United States
World Championships
Gold medal – first place	2025 Zagreb	86 kg
Bronze medal – third place	2023 Belgrade	92 kg
World Cup
Gold medal – first place	2022 Coralville	Team
Pan American Championships
Gold medal – first place	2022 Acapulco	86 kg
Gold medal – first place	2025 Monterrey	86 kg
Gold medal – first place	2026 Coralville	86 kg
Dan Kolov & Nikola Petrov Tournament
Gold medal – first place	2025 Varna	86 kg
Gold medal – first place	2026 Plovdiv	86 kg
Golden Grand Prix Ivan Yarygin
Bronze medal – third place	2022 Krasnoyarsk	86 kg
Grand Prix
Gold medal – first place	2015 Madrid	86 kg
Gold medal – first place	2021 Rome	86 kg
Gold medal – first place	2021 Warsaw	86 kg
Gold medal – first place	2023 Budapest	92 kg
Gold medal – first place	2025 Zagreb	86 kg
Bronze medal – third place	2021 Nice	86 kg
Bronze medal – third place	2023 Zagreb	86 kg
Bronze medal – third place	2026 Zagreb	86 kg
U20 World Championships
Silver medal – second place	2017 Tampere	84 kg
US National Championships
Gold medal – first place	2019 Fort Worth	86 kg
Gold medal – first place	2023 Las Vegas	86 kg
Gold medal – first place	2025 Las Vegas	86 kg
Collegiate Wrestling
NCAA Division I Championships
Gold medal – first place	2018 Cleveland	174 lb
Gold medal – first place	2019 Pittsburgh	174 lb
Bronze medal – third place	2017 St. Louis	174 lb
Pac-12 Championships
Gold medal – first place	2017 Stanford	174 lb
Gold medal – first place	2018 Corvallis	174 lb
Gold medal – first place	2019 Tempe	174 lb

Zahid Valencia (born May 11, 1997) is an American freestyle wrestler and graduated folkstyle wrestler who competes at 86 kilograms. In freestyle, he was the 2025 World Champion, upgrading his podium finish from a 2023 World Championship bronze medal at 92 kilograms.

As a folkstyle wrestler, he was a two-time NCAA Division I national champion and a three-time Pac-12 Conference champion for the Arizona State Sun Devils.

== Folkstyle career ==
=== High school ===
Zahid attended St. John Bosco High School along with his brother Anthony. A three-time CIF state champion, Valencia won four Walsh Jesuit Ironman titles and placed third in the state as a sophomore. His setback at the state tournament was the only one in his high school career, compiling 158 wins with 100 pins and twelve technical falls. When he graduated, Valencia received the Dave Schultz High School Excellence Award, was named the 2015 Junior Hodge Trophy winner, and was ranked as one of the top five recruits in the nation.

In June 2014, Zahid and his brother Anthony, announced that they had committed to wrestle for the Arizona State Sun Devils in the NCAA Division I level.

=== Arizona State University ===
==== 2015–2016 ====
Wearing a redshirt during his first college season, Valencia went 8–2 combined after two tournaments, with one loss handed by graduated two-time Dan Hodge Trophy winner David Taylor from Penn State, and the other one by returning All-American Hayden Zillmer, placing seventh at the Midland Championships. He also claimed the Edinboro Open title.

==== 2016–2017 ====
Valencia had one of the most dominant freshman campaigns in the history of ASU. During regular season, he racked up titles from the Midlands Championships, the Cliff Keen Las Vegas Invite, the Journeyman Collegiate Classic and the Daktronics Open, went 14–0 in dual meets and racked up an overall undefeated record of 31–0. At the Pac-12 Championships, he defeated two opponents, including the fastest pin of the tournament (16 seconds) and was named the Outstanding Wrestler.

Entering NCAA's as an undefeated top-seed, Valencia won his first three matches (including one over eventual World and Olympic medalist Myles Amine) to make the semifinals, where he suffered his only loss of the season to Mark Hall from Penn State. He then went on to place third and claim All-American honors. Valencia was named the Pac-12 Wrestler and Freshman of the Year (first ever to obtain both honors), and the Sun Devil Most Outstanding Wrestler.

==== 2017–2018 ====
As a sophomore, Valencia claimed titles from the Cliff Keen Invitational (named OW) and the Midlands Championships, and compiled a 25–0 record during the regular season. In the postseason, he claimed his second straight Pac-12 title, and entered the NCAA's as the top seed for the second year straight.

At the NCAA championships, Valencia scored two pins and a major decision to reach the semifinals, where he defeated returning All-American Myles Amine on points to make the finals. In the first-place match, he defeated rival and returning NCAA champion Mark Hall, who had denied Valencia the title opportunity the previous year, with an 8–2 decision to become the eleventh Sun Devil to claim an NCAA title. After the season, Valencia was named the Pac-12 Wrestler of the Year, marking the first time a wrestler had earned back-to-back honors since Eric Larkin (2001–2003).

==== 2018–2019 ====
During his junior year, Valencia claimed titles in the Bison Open, the Cougar Clash and a third-consecutive Midlands title. This season marked the first and second times he had been defeated during the regular season, losing to Mark Hall and Daniel Lewis from Missouri, posting a 13–2 record in duals and 24–2 overall. At the Pac-12 Championships, Valencia scored two technical falls to claim his third straight title and be named the OW.

At the NCAA championships, Valencia, the third-seed, made his way to his second finals match with a pin and three major decisions, also avenging his regular-season loss to Daniel Lewis. In the first-place match, he once again faced Mark Hall, whom he edged by a point and denied the title for a second time, claiming a second NCAA title himself and avenging his other loss from the regular season. After the season, Valencia was named the Pac-12 Wrestler of the Year for the third time.

==== 2019–2020 ====
As a senior, Valencia moved up from 174 to 184 pounds, claimed titles from the Journeyman Collegiate Classic and the Cliff Keen Invitational, and had posted an undefeated 12–0 record in dual meets (20–0 overall). On February, Valencia tested positive for a recreational substance in a doping test from the Matteo Pellicone, a freestyle tournament where he had competed in January 2020, and was subsequently suspended by the ASU wrestling team, which cut short his season and his collegiate career.

== Freestyle career ==
=== Age-group ===
As a junior, Valencia was a three-time US World Team Member and national champion, and placed tenth, seventh, and second respectively at the World Championships. He also competed at the 2016 Beat the Streets dual against Mojtaba Goleij, where he was defeated. He was a two-time Fargo national champion at the cadet level.

=== Senior level ===
==== 2015–2016 ====
Valencia made his senior-level debut at the Grand Prix of Spain on July 11, 2015, where he placed second after victories over international opponents. He came back later at the Bill Farrell Memorial International, but was unable to place, going out with three victories and two losses. To close off 2015, Valencia went 2–2 at the US Senior Nationals. In January 2016, Valencia went 0–2 at the Dave Schultz Memorial International.

==== 2018–2020 ====
Valencia came back to the freestyle scene in big fashion after his '18 NCAA championship run at the US World Team Trials of May 2018. In the WTT Challenge tournament, he opened up with a 10–0 technical fall over two-time ACC champion Josh Asper, and shook three-time NCAA Division I champion Alex Dieringer twice, downing him 7–0 and 5–1. At Final X, he took on the eventual '18 World Champion and four–time NCAA champion Kyle Dake, who defeated Valencia 0–4 and 3–4.

After one year of inactivity in freestyle, Valencia competed at the US World Team Trials Challenge in May 2019. In the first round, he earned a technical superiority over Geno Morelli, and a 5–0 victory over his collegiate rival Mark Hall in the semifinals. In the best-of-three, he once again faced Alex Dieringer, but was dominantly defeated twice.

In December 2019, Valencia moved up from 79 kilos to 86 kilos and claimed his first US National title at the Senior Nationals of Fort Worth, Texas. In this tournament, he claimed notable wins over Nate Jackson, Aaron Brooks, and Myles Martin.

He came back a month later at the 2020 Matteo Pellicone Ranking Series of January, in Italy. He racked up wins over '18 World Championship runner-up Fatih Erdin and avenged his losses to Alex Dieringer to claim the title. However, it was announced on February that Valencia had been disqualified due to a failed drug test, where he tested positive to a banned, recreational substance. This also caused his suspension from the ASU wrestling team.

Valencia was scheduled to wrestle at the '20 US Olympic Team Trials on April 4–5 at State College, Pennsylvania. However, the event was postponed along with the 2020 Summer Olympics due to the COVID-19 pandemic. Both competitions were later scheduled to take place in 2021.

Valencia headlined FloWrestling: Burroughs vs. Valencia on November 14, 2020, against '12 Olympic Gold medalist and four-time World Champion (at 74 kg) Jordan Burroughs, at a catchweight of 185 pounds. At the weigh-ins, Burroughs weighed 178.2 pounds, while Valencia marked 184.1 pounds on the scale. After a perfect 4–0 first period lead, Valencia was bombed with four takedowns while only earning one step-out, which was enough for the smaller athlete to claim the victory.

==== 2021 ====
To start off the year, Valencia competed at the Henri Deglane Grand Prix of France on January 16. First, he drove the accomplished Russian Magomed Ramazanov to a back-and-forth match, which he ended up losing seven points to eight. In the consolation bracket, he claimed three straight victories to claim bronze, with a notable technical fall over '12 Olympic bronze medalist and two-time European Champion Dato Marsagishvili in the last match.

Valencia then wrestled at the prestigious UWW Matteo Pellicone Ranking Series on March 7. After two technical falls, one of which was over '18 World Championship runner-up Fatih Erdin, Valencia proved his improved skills against long-time rival and multiple–time age–group World Champion Mark Hall, earning a flawless technical fall to claim the gold medal.

Valencia competed at the rescheduled US Olympic Team Trials on April 2–3 as the second seed, in an attempt to represent the United States at the 2020 Summer Olympics. After defeating reigning NCAA champion Aaron Brooks, he was downed by 2019 U23 World Champion Bo Nickal, before coming back to beat Nate Jackson and Pat Downey.

Valencia came back at the prestigious Poland Open on June 8, where he racked up notable and dominant wins over '19 World Championship silver medalist from India Deepak Punia, '20 European Championship silver medalist from San Marino Myles Amine and '21 European Championship silver medalist from Georgia Sandro Aminashvili en route to the gold medal.

== Freestyle record ==
Senior Freestyle Matches
Res.	Record	Opponent	Score	Date	Event	Location
2026 Final X (silver) at 86 kg
Loss	105–30	(United States) Kyle Dake	4-0	June 19, 2026	2026 Final X	(United States) Newark, New Jersey
Loss	105–29	(United States) Kyle Dake	4-1	June 19, 2026	2026 Final X	(United States) Newark, New Jersey
Win	105–28	(United States) Kyle Dake	3-2	June 19, 2026	2026 Final X	(United States) Newark, New Jersey
2026 Pan American Championships (gold) at 86 kg
Win	104-28	(Dominican Republic) Chris Foca	TF 10-0	May 10, 2026	2026 Pan American Wrestling Championships	(United States) Coralville, Iowa
Win	103-28	(Brazil) Pedro Gonçalves	TF 11-0	May 10, 2026	2026 Pan American Wrestling Championships	(United States) Coralville, Iowa
Win	102-28	(Colombia) Néstor Tafur	TF 10-0	May 10, 2026	2026 Pan American Wrestling Championships	(United States) Coralville, Iowa
Win	101-28	(United States) Aeoden Sinclair	8-2	April 18, 2026	RAF 08	(United States) Philadelphia, Pennsylvania
Win	100-28	(Egypt) Mahmoud Fawzy	TF 10-0	February 28, 2026	RAF 06	(United States) Tempe, Arizona
2026 Grand Prix Zagreb Open (bronze) at 86 kg
Win	99-28	(Iran) Abolfazl Shamsipour	Fall	February 4, 2026	2026 Grand Prix Zagreb Open	Zagreb, Croatia
Loss	98-28	(Georgia (country)) Vladimeri Gamkrelidze	TF 0-11	February 4, 2026	2026 Grand Prix Zagreb Open	Zagreb, Croatia
Win	98-27	(India) Sandeep Mann	TF 11-0	February 4, 2026	2026 Grand Prix Zagreb Open	Zagreb, Croatia
Win	97-27	(United States) Nate Jackson	4-0	January 10, 2026	RAF 05	(United States) Sunrise, Florida
Loss	96-27	(United States) Parker Keckeisen	2-10	December 20, 2025	RAF 04	(United States) Fishers, Indiana
Win	96-26	(France) Rakhim Magamadov	5-0	November 29, 2025	Cowboy RTC vs France	(United States) Durant, Oklahoma
2025 World Championships (gold) at 86 kg
Win	95–26	(Japan) Hayato Ishiguro	TF 12-0	September 13–14, 2025	2025 World Championships	Zagreb, Croatia
Win	94–26	(Iran) Kamran Ghasempour	7-0	September 13–14, 2025	2025 World Championships	Zagreb, Croatia
Win	93–26	(Latvia) Ivars Samušonoks	TF 10–0	September 13–14, 2025	2025 World Championships	Zagreb, Croatia
Win	92–26	(Algeria) Fateh Benferdjallah	TF 10–0	September 13–14, 2025	2025 World Championships	Zagreb, Croatia
Win	91–26	(India) Mukul Dahiya	TF 10–0	September 13–14, 2025	2025 World Championships	Zagreb, Croatia
2025 US World Team Trials (gold) at 86 kg
Win	90–26	(United States) Kyle Dake	4–1	June 14, 2025	2025 Final X	(United States) Newark, New Jersey
Win	89–26	(United States) Kyle Dake	5–3	June 14, 2025	2025 Final X	(United States) Newark, New Jersey
2025 Pan American Championships (gold) at 86 kg
Win	88–26	(Argentina) Jorge Llano	TF 11–0	May 10, 2025	2025 Pan American Championships	Monterrey, Mexico
Win	87–26	(Canada) Taran Goring	TF 10–0	May 10, 2025	2025 Pan American Championships	Monterrey, Mexico
Win	86–26	(Venezuela) Steven Rodriguez	TF 11–0	May 10, 2025	2025 Pan American Championships	Monterrey, Mexico
2025 US Open (gold) at 86 kg
Win	85–26	(United States) Kyle Dake	8–4	April 25–26, 2025	2025 US Open National Championships	(United States) Las Vegas, Nevada
Win	84–26	(United States) Chance Marsteller	4–2	April 25–26, 2025	2025 US Open National Championships	(United States) Las Vegas, Nevada
Win	83–26	(United States) Reece Heller	TF 11–0	April 25–26, 2025	2025 US Open National Championships	(United States) Las Vegas, Nevada
Win	82–26	(United States) Jaden Bullock	TF 10–0	April 25–26, 2025	2025 US Open National Championships	(United States) Las Vegas, Nevada
Win	81–26	(United States) Adrian Chavez	TF 10–0	April 25–26, 2025	2025 US Open National Championships	(United States) Las Vegas, Nevada
Win	80–26	(United States) Trent Hidlay	5–0	February 26, 2025	FloWrestling: Night in America – 88 kg	(United States) Coralville, Iowa
2025 Grand Prix Zagreb Open (gold) at 86 kg
Win	79–26	(Azerbaijan) Arsenii Dzhioev	8–0	February 5, 2025	2025 Grand Prix Zagreb Open	Zagreb, Croatia
Win	78–26	(United States) Nathan Jackson	TF 12–2	February 5, 2025	2025 Grand Prix Zagreb Open	Zagreb, Croatia
Win	77–26	(Iran) Abolfazl Rahmani Firouzjaei	5–2	February 5, 2025	2025 Grand Prix Zagreb Open	Zagreb, Croatia
Win	76–26	(Israel) Matt Finesilver	TF 10–0	February 5, 2025	2025 Grand Prix Zagreb Open	Zagreb, Croatia
2025 Dan Kolov & Nikola Petrov (gold) at 86 kg
Win	75–26	(United States) Chance Marsteller	TF 10–0	January 23–26, 2025	2025 Dan Kolov & Nikola Petrov Tournament	Sofia, Bulgaria
Win	74–26	(Israel) Matt Finesilver	TF 11–0	January 23–26, 2025	2025 Dan Kolov & Nikola Petrov Tournament	Sofia, Bulgaria
Win	73–26	(Bulgaria) Kiro Mihov	TF 18–5	January 23–26, 2025	2025 Dan Kolov & Nikola Petrov Tournament	Sofia, Bulgaria
Win	72–26	(Georgia (country)) Tornike Samkharadze	TF 12–2	January 23–26, 2025	2025 Dan Kolov & Nikola Petrov Tournament	Sofia, Bulgaria
2024 US World Team Trials (silver) at 92 kg
Loss	71–26	(United States) David Taylor	Fall	September 15, 2024	2024 US World Team Trials	(United States) Lincoln, Nebraska
Loss	71–25	(United States) David Taylor	3–3	September 15, 2024	2024 US World Team Trials	(United States) Lincoln, Nebraska
2024 US Olympic Team Trials 4th at 86 kg
Loss		(United States) Trent Hidlay	FF	April 19–20, 2024	2024 US Olympic Team Trials	(United States) State College, Pennsylvania
Loss	71–24	(United States) Aaron Brooks	6–7	April 19–20, 2024	2024 US Olympic Team Trials	(United States) State College, Pennsylvania
Win	71–23	(United States) Chance Marsteller	3–0	April 19–20, 2024	2024 US Olympic Team Trials	(United States) State College, Pennsylvania
2024 Grand Prix Zagreb Open 20th at 86 kg
Loss	70–23	(Ukraine) Valentyn Babii	2–10	January 10, 2024	2024 Grand Prix Zagreb Open	Zagreb, Croatia
2023 World Championships (bronze) at 92 kg
Win	70–22	(Japan) Arash Yoshida	TF 11–0	September 17–18, 2023	2023 World Championships	Belgrade, Serbia
Win	69–22	(Ukraine) Denys Sahaliuk	6–0	September 17–18, 2023	2023 World Championships	Belgrade, Serbia
Loss	68–22	(Azerbaijan) Osman Nurmagomedov	1–5	September 17–18, 2023	2023 World Championships	Belgrade, Serbia
Win	68–21	(Iran) Amir Ali Azarpira	12–9	September 17–18, 2023	2023 World Championships	Belgrade, Serbia
2023 Polyák Imre & Varga János Ranking Series (gold) at 92 kg
Win	67–21	(Israel) Matt Finesilver	TF 10–0	July 13, 2023	2023 Polyák Imre & Varga János Memorial Tournament	Budapest, Hungary
Win	66–21	(Kazakhstan) Rizabek Aitmukhan	TF 10–0	July 13, 2023	2023 Polyák Imre & Varga János Memorial Tournament	Budapest, Hungary
Win	65–21	(Ukraine) Denys Sahaliuk	8–1	July 13, 2023	2023 Polyák Imre & Varga János Memorial Tournament	Budapest, Hungary
Win	64–21	(Georgia (country)) Miriani Maisuradze	5–3	July 13, 2023	2023 Polyák Imre & Varga János Memorial Tournament	Budapest, Hungary
Loss	63–21	(Iran) Amir Ali Azarpira	3–6	July 13, 2023	2023 Polyák Imre & Varga János Memorial Tournament	Budapest, Hungary
2023 US World Team Trials (gold) at 92 kg
Win	63–20	(United States) Michael Macchiavello	9–2	June 10, 2023	2023 Final X Newark	(United States) Newark, New Jersey
Win	62–20	(United States) Michael Macchiavello	8–0	June 10, 2023	2023 Final X Newark	(United States) Newark, New Jersey
Win	61–20	(United States) Kollin Moore	TF 12–1	May 20–21, 2023	2023 US World Team Trials Challenge	(United States) Colorado Springs, Colorado
Win	60–20	(United States) Tanner Sloan	TF 12–1	May 20–21, 2023	2023 US World Team Trials Challenge	(United States) Colorado Springs, Colorado
Win	59–20	(United States) Morgan Mcintosh	6–2	May 20–21, 2023	2023 US World Team Trials Challenge	(United States) Colorado Springs, Colorado
2023 US Open (silver) at 86 kg
Loss	58–20	(United States) Aaron Brooks	6–10	April 27–28, 2023	2023 US Open National Championships	(United States) Las Vegas, Nevada
Win	58–19	(United States) Trent Hidlay	8–3	April 27–28, 2023	2023 US Open National Championships	(United States) Las Vegas, Nevada
Win	57–19	(United States) Maximus Hale	7–2	April 27–28, 2023	2023 US Open National Championships	(United States) Las Vegas, Nevada
Win	56–19	(United States) Cade Mueller	TF 10–0	April 27–28, 2023	2023 US Open National Championships	(United States) Las Vegas, Nevada
Win	55–19	(United States) Rowan Morgan	Fall	April 27–28, 2023	2023 US Open National Championships	(United States) Las Vegas, Nevada
2023 Ibrahim Moustafa Open (silver) at 86 kg
Loss	54–19	(Ukraine) Vasyl Mykhailov	6–8	February 26, 2023	2023 Ibrahim Moustafa Tournament	Alexandria, Egypt
Win	54–18	(Puerto Rico) Ethan Ramos	TF 10–0	February 26, 2023	2023 Ibrahim Moustafa Tournament	Alexandria, Egypt
Win	53–18	(Uzbekistan) Bobur Islomov	7–0	February 26, 2023	2023 Ibrahim Moustafa Tournament	Alexandria, Egypt
Win	52–18	(Poland) Sebastian Jezierzański	TF 12–0	February 26, 2023	2023 Ibrahim Moustafa Tournament	Alexandria, Egypt
2023 Grand Prix Zagreb Open (bronze) at 86 kg
Win	51–18	(San Marino) Myles Amine	6–0	February 1–5, 2023	2023 Grand Prix Zagreb Open	Zagreb, Croatia
Loss	50–18	(Japan) Hayato Ishiguro	TF 0–11	February 1–5, 2023	2023 Grand Prix Zagreb Open	Zagreb, Croatia
Win	50–17	(China) Lin Zushen	10–9	February 1–5, 2023	2023 Grand Prix Zagreb Open	Zagreb, Croatia
Win	49–17	(Austria) Benjamin Greil	TF 10–0	February 1–5, 2023	2023 Grand Prix Zagreb Open	Zagreb, Croatia
2022 World Cup at 86 kg – (gold) for Team USA
Win	48–17	(Iran) Alireza Karimi	5–3	December 10–11, 2022	2022 World Cup	(United States) Coralville, Iowa
Win	47–17	(Georgia (country)) Sandro Aminashvili	TF 11–0	December 10–11, 2022	2022 World Cup	(United States) Coralville, Iowa
Win	46–17	(Mongolia) Bayasgalangiin Bat-Erdene	TF 10–0	December 10–11, 2022	2022 World Cup	(United States) Coralville, Iowa
2022 Final X NYC (silver) at 86 kg
Loss	45–17	(United States) David Taylor	TF 0–10	June 8, 2022	2022 Final X NYC	(United States) New York City, New York
Loss	45–16	(United States) David Taylor	2–4	June 8, 2022	2022 Final X NYC	(United States) New York City, New York
Win	45–15	(United States) Mark Hall	TF 10–0	May 21–22, 2022	2022 US World Team Trials Challenge	(United States) Coralville, Iowa
Win	44–15	(United States) Mark Hall	6–0	May 21–22, 2022	2022 US World Team Trials Challenge	(United States) Coralville, Iowa
Win	43–15	(United States) Trent Hidlay	9–4	May 21–22, 2022	2022 US World Team Trials Challenge	(United States) Coralville, Iowa
Win	42–15	(United States) Andrew Morgan	TF 10–0	May 21–22, 2022	2022 US World Team Trials Challenge	(United States) Coralville, Iowa
2022 Pan American Championships (gold) at 86 kg
Win	41–15	(Cuba) Lázaro Hernández	4–1	May 8, 2022	2022 Pan American Continental Championships	Acapulco, Mexico
Win	40–15	(Colombia) Carlos Izquierdo	TF 14–4	May 8, 2022	2022 Pan American Continental Championships	Acapulco, Mexico
Win	39–15	(Mexico) Christian Anguiano	TF 11–0	May 8, 2022	2022 Pan American Continental Championships	Acapulco, Mexico
Win	38–15	(Mexico) Noel Torres	TF 10–0	February 13, 2022	2022 Bout at the Ballpark	(United States) Arlington, Texas
2022 Ivan Yarygin Golden Grand Prix (bronze) at 86 kg
Win	37–15	(Russia) Omar Ziyaudinov	TF 10–0	January 27–30, 2022	Golden Grand Prix Ivan Yarygin 2022	Krasnoyarsk, Russia
Loss	36–15	(Russia) Amanula Rasulov	2–5	January 27–30, 2022	Golden Grand Prix Ivan Yarygin 2022	Krasnoyarsk, Russia
Win	36–14	(Kazakhstan) Azamat Dauletbekov	2–2	January 27–30, 2022	Golden Grand Prix Ivan Yarygin 2022	Krasnoyarsk, Russia
Win	35–14	(Russia) Babuli Tsoloev	11–2	January 27–30, 2022	Golden Grand Prix Ivan Yarygin 2022	Krasnoyarsk, Russia
2021 Poland Open (gold) at 86 kg
Win	34–14	(Georgia (country)) Sandro Aminashvili	TF 10–0	June 8, 2021	2021 Poland Open	Warsaw, Poland
Win	33–14	(San Marino) Myles Amine	7–1	June 8, 2021	2021 Poland Open	Warsaw, Poland
Win		(India) Deepak Punia	INJ	June 8, 2021	2021 Poland Open	Warsaw, Poland
Win	32–14	(Poland) Sebastian Jezierzański	6–5	June 8, 2021	2021 Poland Open	Warsaw, Poland
2020 US Olympic Team Trials (bronze) at 86 kg
Win	31–14	(United States) Pat Downey	TF 11–1	April 2–3, 2021	2020 US Olympic Team Trials	(United States) Fort Worth, Texas
Win	30–14	(United States) Nate Jackson	TF 10–0	April 2–3, 2021	2020 US Olympic Team Trials	(United States) Fort Worth, Texas
Loss	29–14	(United States) Bo Nickal	5–12	April 2–3, 2021	2020 US Olympic Team Trials	(United States) Fort Worth, Texas
Win	29–13	(United States) Aaron Brooks	6–3	April 2–3, 2021	2020 US Olympic Team Trials	(United States) Fort Worth, Texas
2021 Matteo Pellicone Ranking Series (gold) at 86 kg
Win	28–13	(United States) Mark Hall	TF 11–0	March 7, 2021	Matteo Pellicone Ranking Series 2021	Rome, Italy
Win	27–13	(Turkey) Fatih Erdin	TF 12–2	March 7, 2021	Matteo Pellicone Ranking Series 2021	Rome, Italy
Win	26–13	(Kazakhstan) Yeskali Dauletkazy	TF 11–1	March 7, 2021	Matteo Pellicone Ranking Series 2021	Rome, Italy
2021 Henri Deglane Grand Prix (bronze) at 86 kg
Win	25–13	(Georgia (country)) Dato Marsagishvili	TF 10–0	January 16, 2021	Grand Prix de France Henri Deglane 2021	Nice, France
Win	24–13	(Spain) Damian Iglesias	TF 10–0	January 16, 2021	Grand Prix de France Henri Deglane 2021	Nice, France
Win	23–13	(Moldova) Andrian Grosul	TF 13–2	January 16, 2021	Grand Prix de France Henri Deglane 2021	Nice, France
Loss	22–13	(Russia) Magomed Ramazanov	7–8	January 16, 2021	Grand Prix de France Henri Deglane 2021	Nice, France
Loss	22–12	(United States) Jordan Burroughs	5–8	November 14, 2020	FloWrestling: Burroughs vs. Valencia	(United States) Austin, Texas
2020 Matteo Pellicone Ranking Series DQ at 86 kg
Win	22–11	(United States) Alex Dieringer	7–5	January 15–18, 2020	Matteo Pellicone Ranking Series 2020	Rome, Italy
Win	21–11	(Turkey) Fatih Erdin	TF 10–0	January 15–18, 2020	Matteo Pellicone Ranking Series 2020	Rome, Italy
Win	20–11	(Germany) William Raffi	TF 11–1	January 15–18, 2020	Matteo Pellicone Ranking Series 2020	Rome, Italy
2019 US Nationals (gold) at 86 kg
Win	19–11	(United States) Myles Martin	7–5	December 20–22, 2019	2019 Senior Nationals - US Olympic Trials Qualifier	(United States) Fort Worth, Texas
Win	18–11	(United States) Aaron Brooks	6–0	December 20–22, 2019	2019 Senior Nationals - US Olympic Trials Qualifier	(United States) Fort Worth, Texas
Win	17–11	(United States) Nate Jackson	3–2	December 20–22, 2019	2019 Senior Nationals - US Olympic Trials Qualifier	(United States) Fort Worth, Texas
Win	16–11	(United States) Syed Ul-Hasan	TF 10–0	December 20–22, 2019	2019 Senior Nationals - US Olympic Trials Qualifier	(United States) Fort Worth, Texas
Win	15–11	(United States) Jeff Palmeri	TF 14–3	December 20–22, 2019	2019 Senior Nationals - US Olympic Trials Qualifier	(United States) Fort Worth, Texas
2019 US World Team Trials (bronze) at 79 kg
Loss	14–11	(United States) Alex Dieringer	TF 2–12	May 17–19, 2019	2019 US World Team Trials Challenge	(United States) Raleigh, North Dakota
Loss	14–10	(United States) Alex Dieringer	TF 1–12	May 17–19, 2019	2019 US World Team Trials Challenge	(United States) Raleigh, North Dakota
Win	14–9	(United States) Mark Hall	5–0	May 17–19, 2019	2019 US World Team Trials Challenge	(United States) Raleigh, North Dakota
Win	13–9	(United States) Geno Morelli	TF 10–0	May 17–19, 2019	2019 US World Team Trials Challenge	(United States) Raleigh, North Dakota
2018 US World Team Trials (silver) at 79 kg
Loss	12–9	(United States) Kyle Dake	3–4	July 15–16, 2018	2018 Final X: State College	(United States) State College, Pennsylvania
Loss	12–8	(United States) Kyle Dake	0–4	July 15–16, 2018	2018 Final X: State College	(United States) State College, Pennsylvania
Win	12–7	(United States) Alex Dieringer	5–1	May 18–20, 2018	2018 US World Team Trials Challenge	(United States) Rochester, Minnesota
Win	11–7	(United States) Alex Dieringer	7–0	May 18–20, 2018	2018 US World Team Trials Challenge	(United States) Rochester, Minnesota
Win	10–7	(United States) Joshua Asper	TF 10–0	May 18–20, 2018	2018 US World Team Trials Challenge	(United States) Rochester, Minnesota
2016 Dave Schultz M. International DNP at 86 kg
Loss	9–7	(United States) Victor Terrell	TF 0–11	January 28–30, 2016	2016 Dave Schultz Memorial International	(United States) Colorado Springs, Colorado
Loss	9–6	(United States) Deron Winn	TF 0–10	January 28–30, 2016	2016 Dave Schultz Memorial International	(United States) Colorado Springs, Colorado
2015 US Nationals DNP at 86 kg
Loss	9–5	(United States) Clayton Foster	2–8	December 17–19, 2015	2015 Senior Nationals - US Olympic Trials Qualifier	(United States) Las Vegas, Nevada
Win	9–4	(United States) Joshua Asper	4–4	December 17–19, 2015	2015 Senior Nationals - US Olympic Trials Qualifier	(United States) Las Vegas, Nevada
Win	8–4	(United States) Frank Richmond	4–4	December 17–19, 2015	2015 Senior Nationals - US Olympic Trials Qualifier	(United States) Las Vegas, Nevada
Loss	7–4	(United States) Keith Gavin	TF 2–13	December 17–19, 2015	2015 Senior Nationals - US Olympic Trials Qualifier	(United States) Las Vegas, Nevada
2015 Bill Farrell International Open DNP at 86 kg
Loss	7–3	(United States) Tyler Caldwell	1–5	November 5–7, 2015	2015 Bill Farrell International Open	(United States) New York City, New York
Win	7–2	(United States) Timmy McCall	2–1	November 5–7, 2015	2015 Bill Farrell International Open	(United States) New York City, New York
Win	6–2	(Canada) Matthew Miller	Fall	November 5–7, 2015	2015 Bill Farrell International Open	(United States) New York City, New York
Loss	5–2	(United States) Robert Hamlin	3–7	November 5–7, 2015	2015 Bill Farrell International Open	(United States) New York City, New York
Win	5–1	(Canada) Grayson St-Laurent	TF 10–0	November 5–7, 2015	2015 Bill Farrell International Open	(United States) New York City, New York
2015 Spain Grand Prix (silver) at 86 kg
Loss	4–1	(Spain) Taimuraz Friev	2–7	July 11, 2015	2015 Grand Prix of Spain	Madrid, Spain
Win	4–0	(Canada) Jasmit Phulka	TF 10–0	July 11, 2015	2015 Grand Prix of Spain	Madrid, Spain
Win	3–0	(Iran) Vahid Shahmohammadiizad	4–4	July 11, 2015	2015 Grand Prix of Spain	Madrid, Spain
Win	2–0	(Italy) Simone Iannattoni	TF 11–0	July 11, 2015	2015 Grand Prix of Spain	Madrid, Spain
Win	1–0	(Japan) Shirai Shota	8–4	July 11, 2015	2015 Grand Prix of Spain	Madrid, Spain

== NCAA record ==
NCAA Championships Matches
Res.	Record	Opponent	Score	Date	Event
2019 NCAA Championships (gold) at 174 lbs
Win	15-1	Mark Hall	4-3	March 21–23, 2019	2019 NCAA Division I Wrestling Championships
Win	14–1	Daniel Lewis	MD 11-3	March 21–23, 2019	2019 NCAA Division I Wrestling Championships
Win	13–1	Ben Harvey	Fall	March 21–23, 2019	2019 NCAA Division I Wrestling Championships
Win	12–1	Kimball Bastian	MD 16-5	March 21–23, 2019	2019 NCAA Division I Wrestling Championships
Win	11–1	Dean Sherry	MD 11–2	March 21–23, 2019	2019 NCAA Division I Wrestling Championships
2018 NCAA Championships (gold) at 174 lbs
Win	10–1	Mark Hall	8-2	March 15–17, 2018	2018 NCAA Division I Wrestling Championships
Win	9–1	Myles Amine	7-5	March 15–17, 2018	2018 NCAA Division I Wrestling Championships
Win	8–1	Jadaen Bernstein	Fall	March 15–17, 2018	2018 NCAA Division I Wrestling Championships
Win	7–1	Christian Brucki	MD 18-5	March 15–17, 2018	2018 NCAA Division I Wrestling Championships
Win	6–1	Matt Finesilver	MD 14-4	March 15–17, 2018	2018 NCAA Division I Wrestling Championships
2017 NCAA Championships (bronze) at 174 lbs
Win	5–1	Myles Amine	MD 15-5	March 16–18, 2017	2017 NCAA Division I Wrestling Championships
Win	4-1	Zac Brunson	Fall	March 16–18, 2017	2017 NCAA Division I Wrestling Championships
Loss	3-1	Mark Hall	3-4	March 16–18, 2017	2017 NCAA Division I Wrestling Championships
Win	3-0	Myles Amine	14-8	March 16–18, 2017	2017 NCAA Division I Wrestling Championships
Win	2–0	Christian Brucki	MD 12-3	March 16–18, 2017	2017 NCAA Division I Wrestling Championships
Win	1–0	Christopher Pfarr	MD 19-5	March 16–18, 2017	2017 NCAA Division I Wrestling Championships

=== Stats ===
Season	Year	School	Rank	Weigh Class	Record	Win	Bonus
2020	Senior	Arizona State University	#1 (DNQ)	184	20-0	100.00%	85.00%
2019	Junior	Arizona State University	#2 (1st)	174	31-2	93.94%	78.79%
2018	Sophomore	Arizona State University	#1 (1st)	174	32-0	100.00%	78.13%
2017	Freshman	Arizona State University	#1 (3rd)	174	38-1	97.44%	71.79%
Career					121-3	97.85%	78.43%
