= 2025 World Wrestling Championships – Men's freestyle 86 kg =

Wrestling competitions

Men's freestyle 86 kg at the 2025 World Championships
- Venue: Arena Zagreb
- Dates: 13–14 September 2025
- Competitors: 29 from 27 nations

Medalists
gold medal	Zahid Valencia	United States
silver medal	Hayato Ishiguro	Japan
bronze medal	Kamran Ghasempour	Iran
bronze medal	Arsenii Dzhioev	Azerbaijan

The men's freestyle 86 kilograms is a competition featured at the 2025 World Wrestling Championships, and was held in Zagreb, Croatia on 13 and 14 September 2025.

This freestyle wrestling competition consists of a single-elimination tournament, with a repechage used to determine the winner of two bronze medals. The two finalists face off for gold and silver medals. Each wrestler who loses to one of the two finalists moves into the repechage, culminating in a pair of bronze medal matches, featuring the semifinal losers each facing the remaining repechage opponent from their half of the bracket.

== Results ==
Legend

- F — Won by fall

=== Final ===
Final
Zahid Valencia (USA)	12
Hayato Ishiguro (JPN)	0

=== Top half ===
Round of 32
Ibragim Kadiev (UWW)	9
Cezary Sadowski (POL)	2
Mukhammad Abdullaev (KGZ)	0
Kamran Ghasempour (IRI)	10
Ayidusi Hade (CHN)	5
Naadambatyn Batbilgüün (MGL)	6
Zahid Valencia (USA)	10
Mukul Dahiya (IND)	0
Fateh Benferdjallah (ALG)	10
Gary Chow (SGP)	0
Ivars Samušonoks (LAT)	4^{F}
Matteo Monteiro (CPV)	0
Krešo Škugor (CRO)	0
Tariel Gaphrindashvili (GEO)	10

Round of 16
Osman Göçen (TUR)	4
Ibragim Kadiev (UWW)	12
Kamran Ghasempour (IRI)	10
Naadambatyn Batbilgüün (MGL)	0
Zahid Valencia (USA)	10
Fateh Benferdjallah (ALG)	0
Ivars Samušonoks (LAT)	4^{F}
Tariel Gaphrindashvili (GEO)	5

Quarterfinals
Ibragim Kadiev (UWW)	4
Kamran Ghasempour (IRI)	5
Zahid Valencia (USA)	10
Ivars Samušonoks (LAT)	0

Semifinals
Kamran Ghasempour (IRI)	0
Zahid Valencia (USA)	7

=== Bottom half ===
Round of 32
Paulius Leščauskas (LTU)	0
Azamat Dauletbekov (KAZ)	10
Simon Marchl (AUT)	6
Ahmed Khaled Mahmoud (EGY)	8
Joshua Morodion (GER)	0
Rakhim Magamadov (FRA)	10
Hayato Ishiguro (JPN)	8
Boris Makoev (SVK)	4
Mukhammed Aliiev (UKR)	8
Traian Căpățînă (MDA)	1
Lee Gyeong-yeon (KOR)	1
Ethan Ramos (PUR)	6

Round of 16
Mahamedkhabib Kadzimahamedau (UWW)	1
Azamat Dauletbekov (KAZ)	8
Ahmed Khaled Mahmoud (EGY)	0
Rakhim Magamadov (FRA)	10
Hayato Ishiguro (JPN)	10
Mukhammed Aliiev (UKR)	0
Ethan Ramos (PUR)	2
Arsenii Dzhioev (AZE)	5

Quarterfinals
Azamat Dauletbekov (KAZ)	1
Rakhim Magamadov (FRA)	12
Hayato Ishiguro (JPN)	13
Arsenii Dzhioev (AZE)	8

Semifinals
Rakhim Magamadov (FRA)	7
Hayato Ishiguro (JPN)	17

=== Repechage ===
Repechage round 1
Mukul Dahiya (IND)	11
Fateh Benferdjallah (ALG)	1
Boris Makoev (SVK)	4
Mukhammed Aliiev (UKR)	14

Repechage round 2
Mukul Dahiya (IND)	11
Ivars Samušonoks (LAT)	0
Mukhammed Aliiev (UKR)	2
Arsenii Dzhioev (AZE)	7

Bronze medals
Mukul Dahiya (IND)	0
Kamran Ghasempour (IRI)	10
Arsenii Dzhioev (AZE)	7
Rakhim Magamadov (FRA)	0

== Final standing ==
Rank	Athlete
1st place, gold medalist(s)	Zahid Valencia (USA)
2nd place, silver medalist(s)	Hayato Ishiguro (JPN)
3rd place, bronze medalist(s)	Kamran Ghasempour (IRI)
3rd place, bronze medalist(s)	Arsenii Dzhioev (AZE)
5	Mukul Dahiya (IND)
5	Rakhim Magamadov (FRA)
7	Ivars Samušonoks (LAT)
8	Mukhammed Aliiev (UKR)
9	Azamat Dauletbekov (KAZ)
10	Ibragim Kadiev (UWW)
11	Fateh Benferdjallah (ALG)
12	Tariel Gaphrindashvili (GEO)
13	Ethan Ramos (PUR)
14	Ahmed Khaled Mahmoud (EGY)
15	Naadambatyn Batbilgüün (MGL)
16	Boris Makoev (SVK)
17	Simon Marchl (AUT)
18	Ayidusi Hade (CHN)
19	Osman Göçen (TUR)
20	Cezary Sadowski (POL)
21	Lee Gyeong-yeon (KOR)
22	Mahamedkhabib Kadzimahamedau (UWW)
23	Traian Căpățînă (MDA)
24	Matteo Monteiro (CPV)
25	Mukhammad Abdullaev (KGZ)
26	Gary Chow (SGP)
27	Krešo Škugor (CRO)
28	Paulius Leščauskas (LTU)
29	Joshua Morodion (GER)
