= 2025 Dan Kolov & Nikola Petrov Tournament =

Dan Kolov & Nikola Petrov 2025
- Host city: Varna, Bulgaria
- Dates: 23–26 January

The 62nd Dan Kolov & Nikola Petrov Tournament was a wrestling event held in Varna, Bulgaria between 23 and 26 January 2025.

This international tournament included competition in both men's and women's freestyle wrestling and men's Greco-Roman wrestling. This tournament was held in honor of Dan Kolov who was the first European freestyle wrestling champion from Bulgaria and European and World Champion Nikola Petroff.

== Event videos ==
The event will air freely on the Bulgarian Wrestling Federation YouTube channel.

Broadcasting
23 January 2025 Mat A. Morning session	23 January 2025 Mat B. Morning session	23 January 2025 Mat A. Evening session	23 January 2025 Mat B. Evening session
24 January 2025 Mat A. Morning session	24 January 2025 Mat B. Morning session	24 January 2025 Mat A. Evening session	24 January 2025 Mat B. Evening session
25 January 2025 Mat A. Morning session	25 January 2025 Mat B. Morning session	25 January 2025 Mat A. Evening session	25 January 2025 Mat B. Evening session
		26 January 2025 Mat A. Final session	

== Medal table ==
* Host nation (Bulgaria)

Rank	Nation	Gold	Silver	Bronze	Total
1	Bulgaria*	11	15	14	40
2	United States	5	3	2	10
3	Iran	3	1	1	5
4	Georgia	3	0	2	5
5	Spain	2	0	0	2
6	Norway	1	1	1	3
7	Ukraine	0	2	3	5
8	Azerbaijan	0	2	1	3
9	Latvia	0	1	0	1
10	Romania	0	0	3	3
Totals (10 entries)		25	25	27	77

== Team ranking ==
Rank	Men's freestyle		Men's Greco-Roman		Women's freestyle	
Rank	Team	Points	Team	Points	Team	Points
1	United States	172	Bulgaria	230	Bulgaria	140
2	Bulgaria	170	Iran	110	Spain	50
3	Georgia	118	Norway	45	Latvia	20
4	Ukraine	113	Ukraine	9		
5	Romania	65				
6	Azerbaijan	63				
7	Israel	27				
8	Ecuador	8				
9	Germany	4				
10

== Medal overview ==
=== Men's freestyle ===
Event	Gold	Silver	Bronze
57 kg	Nika Zangaladze; Georgia	Ivaylo Tisov; Bulgaria	Roman Hutsuliak; Ukraine
61 kg	Daton Fix; United States	Devan Turner; United States	Jeyhun Allahverdiyev; Azerbaijan
61 kg	Daton Fix; United States	Devan Turner; United States	Răzvan Kovacs; Romania
65 kg	Mikyay Naim; Bulgaria	Murad Hagverdiyev; Azerbaijan	Erik Arushanian; Ukraine
65 kg	Mikyay Naim; Bulgaria	Murad Hagverdiyev; Azerbaijan	Gigi Kurkhuli; Georgia
70 kg	William Lewan; United States	Kaloyan Atanasov; Bulgaria	Benjamin Boejthe; Romania
70 kg	William Lewan; United States	Kaloyan Atanasov; Bulgaria	Mihail Georgiev; Bulgaria
74 kg	Quincy Monday; United States	Ivan Kusyak; Ukraine	Presiyan Mihov; Bulgaria
74 kg	Quincy Monday; United States	Ivan Kusyak; Ukraine	Ramazan Ramazanov; Bulgaria
79 kg	Tornike Tulashvili; Georgia	Kennedy Monday; United States	Petar Petkov; Bulgaria
79 kg	Tornike Tulashvili; Georgia	Kennedy Monday; United States	Krisztian Biro; Romania
86 kg	Zahid Valencia; United States	Chance Marsteller; United States	Matt Finesilver; Israel
92 kg	Sandro Kurashvili; Georgia	Sadig Mustafazade; Azerbaijan	Eric Schultz Jr. United States
97 kg	Akhmed Bataev; Bulgaria	Vasyl Sova; Ukraine	Mert Slavov; Bulgaria
125 kg	Mason Parris; United States	Georgi Ivanov; Bulgaria	Yurii Idzinskyi; Ukraine
125 kg	Mason Parris; United States	Georgi Ivanov; Bulgaria	Jordan Wood; United States

=== Men's Greco-Roman ===
Event	Gold	Silver	Bronze
55 kg	Galin Furnadzhiev; Bulgaria	Stefan Stefanov; Bulgaria	Krasimir Kaloyanov; Bulgaria
60 kg	Mohammad Ashiri; Iran	Nedyalko Petrov; Bulgaria	Borislav Kirilov; Bulgaria
63 kg	Grisha Nazaryan; Bulgaria	Miroslav Emilov; Bulgaria	Kristiyan Milenkov; Bulgaria
67 kg	Håvard Jørgensen; Norway	Abu Muslim Amaev; Bulgaria	Nikalas Sulev; Bulgaria
72 kg	Hojat Rezaei; Iran	Ivo Iliev; Bulgaria	Petar Gornyashki; Bulgaria
77 kg	Albert Doev; Bulgaria	Benjamin Hansen; Norway	Per-Anders Kure; Norway
82 kg	Aik Mnatsakanian; Bulgaria	Svetoslav Nikolov; Bulgaria	Mohammad Naghousi; Iran
87 kg	Semen Novikov; Bulgaria	Yasin Yazdi; Iran	Andrey Atanasov; Bulgaria
97 kg	Kiril Milov; Bulgaria	Kaloyan Ivanov; Bulgaria	Yoan Dimitrov; Bulgaria
130 kg	Abolfazl Fathi; Iran	Alan Dzabiev; Bulgaria	Ignat Milenov; Bulgaria

=== Women's freestyle ===
Event	Gold	Silver	Bronze
50 kg	no competitors Only one participant was registered.		
53 kg	Aintzane Gorría; Spain	Nikol Aleksandrova; Bulgaria	Not awarded as there were only 2 competitors.
55 kg	no competitors		
57 kg	no competitors		
59 kg	no competitors		
62 kg	Lydia Pérez; Spain	Fatme Shaban; Bulgaria	Desislava Ivanova; Bulgaria
65 kg	Bilyana Dudova; Bulgaria	Elma Zeidlere; Latvia	Not awarded as there were only 2 competitors.
68 kg	Daniela Brasnarova; Bulgaria	Ilinka Stefanova; Bulgaria	Not awarded as there were only 2 competitors.
72 kg	no competitors		
76 kg	Vanesa Georgieva; Bulgaria	Aleksandra Stoyanova; Bulgaria	Not awarded as there were only 2 competitors.

== Participating nations ==
138 wrestlers from 12 countries:

1. Azerbaijan (4)
2. Bulgaria (76) (Host)
3. Ecuador (1)
4. Spain (2)
5. Germany (1)
6. Iran (5)
7. Israel (2)
8. Latvia (1)
9. Norway (5)
10. Romania (6)
11. Ukraine (9)
12. United States (16)

== Results ==
Legend

- F — Won by fall
- R — Retired
- WO — Won by walkover

=== Men's freestyle ===
==== Men's freestyle 57 kg ====
Pos	Athlete	Pld	W	L	CP	TP	BUL	GEO	USA	BUL
1	Ivaylo Tisov (BUL)	3	3	0	13	29	—	17–8	6–0 Fall	6–0 Fall
2	Nika Zangaladze (GEO)	3	2	1	7	24	1–3 PO1	—	8–3	8–2
3	Brandon Courtney (USA)	3	1	2	6	9	0–5 FA	1–3 PO1	—	6–0 Fall
4	Tanyo Tanev (BUL)	3	0	3	1	2	0–5 FA	1–3 PO1	0–5 FA	—

Source: UWW

Pos	Athlete	Pld	W	L	CP	TP	UKR	USA	ECU
1	Roman Hutsuliak (UKR)	2	2	0	7	16	—	6–3	10–0
2	Liam Cronin (USA)	2	1	1	5	14	1–3 PO1	—	11–0
3	Guesseppe Rea (ECU)	2	0	2	0	0	0–4 SU	0–4 SU	—

Source: UWW

Semifinals
Ivaylo Tisov (BUL)	3
Liam Cronin (USA)	2
Roman Hutsuliak (UKR)	1
Nika Zangaladze (GEO)	12

Final
Ivaylo Tisov (BUL)	2
Nika Zangaladze (GEO)	15
Bronze medal
Liam Cronin (USA)	1
Roman Hutsuliak (UKR)	4

==== Men's freestyle 61 kg ====
Round of 16
Dimitar Biserkov (BUL)	0
Jeyhun Allahverdiyev (AZE)	10
Omar Gazashvili (GEO)	2
Răzvan Kovacs (ROU)	7
Yaroslav Hurskyy (UKR)	4
Stilyan Iliev (BUL)	0

Quarterfinals
Nahshon Garrett (USA)	5
Jeyhun Allahverdiyev (AZE)	15
Denis Naim (BUL)	2
Devan Turner (USA)	5
Michael McGee (USA)	2
Răzvan Kovacs (ROU)	4
Yaroslav Hurskyy (UKR)	0
Daton Fix (USA)	10

Semifinals
Jeyhun Allahverdiyev (AZE)	2
Devan Turner (USA)	4
Răzvan Kovacs (ROU)	0
Daton Fix (USA)	10

Final
Devan Turner (USA)	0
Daton Fix (USA)	3

Bronze medals
Denis Naim (BUL)	0
Jeyhun Allahverdiyev (AZE)	10
Yaroslav Hurskyy (UKR)	1
Răzvan Kovacs (ROU)	3

==== Men's freestyle 65 kg ====
Round of 16
Murad Hagverdiyev (AZE)	10
Nikola Stefanov (BUL)	0

Quarterfinals
Erdal Galip (BUL)	1
Murad Hagverdiyev (AZE)	5
Simeon Panayotov (BUL)	0
Erik Arushanian (UKR)	10
Nikoloz Beshidze (GEO)	3
Gigi Kurkhuli (GEO)	5
Ivan Badavrov (BUL)	0
Mikyay Naim (BUL)	5

Semifinals
Murad Hagverdiyev (AZE)	5
Erik Arushanian (UKR)	3
Gigi Kurkhuli (GEO)	4
Mikyay Naim (BUL)	10

Final
Murad Hagverdiyev (AZE)	2
Mikyay Naim (BUL)	2

Repechage round 1
Nikola Stefanov (BUL)	0
Erdal Galip (BUL)	13

Bronze medal match
Erdal Galip (BUL)	0
Erik Arushanian (UKR)	10
Ivan Badavrov (BUL)	0
Gigi Kurkhuli (GEO)	5

==== Men's freestyle 70 kg ====
Quarterfinals
Nikolay Momakov (BUL)	10
Presiyan Dimitrov (BUL)	0
Benjamin Boejthe (ROU)	3
Kaloyan Atanasov (BUL)	7
Andrii Svyryd (UKR)	0
William Lewan (USA)	10
Yahya Thomas (USA)	2
Mihail Georgiev (BUL)	3

Semifinals
Nikolay Momakov (BUL)	0
Kaloyan Atanasov (BUL)	10
William Lewan (USA)	3
Mihail Georgiev (BUL)	1

Final
Kaloyan Atanasov (BUL)	0
William Lewan (USA)	5

Bronze medals
Benjamin Boejthe (ROU)	10
Nikolay Momakov (BUL)	0
Andrii Svyryd (UKR)	0
Mihail Georgiev (BUL)	3

==== Men's freestyle 74 kg ====
Round of 16
Marian Subțirică (ROU)	13
Elroy Perkin (USA)	12
Ramazan Ramazanov (BUL)	0
Quincy Monday (USA)	12

Quarterfinals
Ivan Kusyak (UKR)	7
Marian Subțirică (ROU)	3
Stiliyan Dzhorov (BUL)	2
Presiyan Mihov (BUL)	13
Saba Kobakhidze (GEO)	2
Zurab Kapraev (ROU)	12
Quincy Monday (USA)	8
Giorgi Rigvava (GEO)	3

Semifinals
Ivan Kusyak (UKR)	7
Presiyan Mihov (BUL)	1
Zurab Kapraev (ROU)	0
Quincy Monday (USA)	3

Final
Ivan Kusyak (UKR)	2
Quincy Monday (USA)	9

Repechage round 1
Ramazan Ramazanov (BUL)	11
Giorgi Rigvava (GEO)	0

Bronze medal match
Marian Subțirică (ROU)	3
Presiyan Mihov (BUL)	3
Ramazan Ramazanov (BUL)	WO
Zurab Kapraev (ROU)

==== Men's freestyle 79 kg ====
Quarterfinals
Tornike Tulashvili (GEO)	2
Petar Petkov (BUL)	0
Nikolay Dimitrov (BUL)	6
Ivan Andonov (BUL)	1
Kennedy Monday (USA)	11^{F}
Bozhidar Dobrev (BUL)	0
Valentin Babii (UKR)	3
Krisztian Biro (ROU)	4

Semifinals
Tornike Tulashvili (GEO)	2
Nikolay Dimitrov (BUL)	1
Kennedy Monday (USA)	9
Krisztian Biro (ROU)	0

Final
Tornike Tulashvili (GEO)	8
Kennedy Monday (USA)	6

Bronze medals
Petar Petkov (BUL)	5
Nikolay Dimitrov (BUL)	3
Bozhidar Dobrev (BUL)	0
Krisztian Biro (ROU)	11

==== Men's freestyle 86 kg ====
Pos	Athlete	Pld	W	L	CP	TP	USA	GEO	BUL
1	Zahid Valencia (USA)	2	2	0	8	30	—	12–2	18–5
2	Tornike Samkharadze (GEO)	2	1	1	5	13	1–4 SU1	—	11–0
3	Kiro Mihov (BUL)	2	0	2	1	5	1–4 SU1	0–4 SU	—

Source: UWW

Pos	Athlete	Pld	W	L	CP	TP	USA	ISR	BUL
1	Chance Marsteller (USA)	2	2	0	8	22	—	12–2	10–0
2	Matt Finesilver (ISR)	2	1	1	5	12	1–4 SU1	—	10–0
3	Grigor Chernakov (BUL)	2	0	2	0	0	0–4 SU	0–4 SU	—

Source: UWW

Semifinals
Zahid Valencia (USA)	11
Matt Finesilver (ISR)	0
Chance Marsteller (USA)	7^{F}
Tornike Samkharadze (GEO)	0

Final
Zahid Valencia (USA)	10
Chance Marsteller (USA)	0
Third place
Matt Finesilver (ISR)	8
Tornike Samkharadze (GEO)	5

==== Men's freestyle 92 kg ====
Pos	Athlete	Pld	W	L	CP	TP	GEO	AZE	USA	ISR	BUL
1	Sandro Kurashvili (GEO)	4	3	1	14	11	—	5–2	2–2 Fall	4–5	WO
2	Sadig Mustafazade (AZE)	4	3	1	11	35	1–3 PO1	—	8–7	7–4	18–6
3	Eric Schultz Jr. (USA)	4	2	2	8	36	0–5 FA	1–3 PO1	—	12–10	15–4
4	Uri Kalashnikov (ISR)	4	2	2	10	19	3–1 PO1	1–3 PO1	1–3 PO1	—	WO
5	Radomir Stoyanov (BUL)	4	0	4	2	10	0–5 IN	1–4 SU1	1–4 SU1	0–5 IN	—

Source: UWW

==== Men's freestyle 97 kg ====
Pos	Athlete	Pld	W	L	CP	TP	BUL	UKR	BUL	BUL	ROU
1	Akhmed Bataev (BUL)	4	4	0	16	38	—	9–0	10–0	9–0 Ret	10–0
2	Vasyl Sova (UKR)	4	3	1	14	19	0–3 PO	—	13–3	6–0 Fall	WO
3	Mert Slavov (BUL)	4	1	3	6	3	0–4 SU	1–4 SU1	—	0–6	WO
4	Andriyan Valkanov (BUL)	4	1	3	4	8	0–5 IN	0–5 FA	3–0 PO	—	2–9
5	Florin Tripon (ROU)	4	1	3	3	9	0–4 SU	0–5 IN	0–5 IN	3–1 PO1	—

Source: UWW

==== Men's freestyle 125 kg ====
Round of 16
Yusif Dursunov (AZE)	10
Christian Lombardi (GER)	0

Quarterfinals
Yurii Idzinskyi (UKR)	2
Yusif Dursunov (AZE)	0
Mason Parris (USA)	10
Dian Manev (BUL)	0
Giga Shavadze (GEO)	1
Jordan Wood (USA)	8
Adel Bakar (BUL)	0
Georgi Ivanov (BUL)	8^{F}

Semifinals
Yurii Idzinskyi (UKR)	0
Mason Parris (USA)	10
Jordan Wood (USA)	4
Georgi Ivanov (BUL)	5

Final
Mason Parris (USA)	13
Georgi Ivanov (BUL)	2

Bronze medals
Dian Manev (BUL)	0
Yurii Idzinskyi (UKR)	10
Adel Bakar (BUL)	0
Jordan Wood (USA)	10

=== Men's Greco-Roman ===
==== Men's Greco-Roman 55 kg ====
Pos	Athlete	Pld	W	L	CP	TP	BUL	BUL	BUL
1	Galin Furnadzhiev (BUL)	2	2	0	9	12	—	3–5 Fall	9–1
2	Stefan Stefanov (BUL)	2	1	1	4	16	0–5 FA	—	11–3
3	Krasimir Kaloyanov (BUL)	2	0	2	2	4	1–4 SU1	1–4 SU1	—

Source: UWW

==== Men's Greco-Roman 60 kg ====
Pos	Athlete	Pld	W	L	CP	TP	BUL	BUL	BUL
1	Borislav Kirilov (BUL)	2	2	0	8	17	—	9–0	8–0
2	Bozhidar Lazarov (BUL)	2	1	1	4	9	0–4 SU	—	9–0
3	Kristin Petrov (BUL)	2	0	2	0	0	0–4 SU	0–4 SU	—

Source: UWW

Pos	Athlete	Pld	W	L	CP	TP	IRI	BUL	BUL
1	Mohammad Ashiri (IRI)	2	2	0	7	15	—	4–0	11–0
2	Nedyalko Petrov (BUL)	2	1	1	4	9	0–3 PO	—	9–0
3	Atanas Asenov (BUL)	2	0	2	0	0	0–4 SU	0–4 SU	—

Source: UWW

Semifinals
Borislav Kirilov (BUL)	1
Nedyalko Petrov (BUL)	2
Mohammad Ashiri (IRI)	6^{F}
Bozhidar Lazarov (BUL)	0

Final
Nedyalko Petrov (BUL)	0
Mohammad Ashiri (IRI)	9
Third place
Borislav Kirilov (BUL)	0^{F}
Bozhidar Lazarov (BUL)	0

==== Men's Greco-Roman 63 kg ====
Pos	Athlete	Pld	W	L	CP	TP	BUL	BUL	BUL
1	Grisha Nazaryan (BUL)	2	2	0	6	14	—	11–8	3–0
2	Miroslav Emilov (BUL)	2	1	1	5	18	1–3 PO1	—	10–1
3	Kristiyan Milenkov (BUL)	2	0	2	1	1	0–3 PO	1–4 SU1	—

Source: UWW

==== Men's Greco-Roman 67 kg ====
Pos	Athlete	Pld	W	L	CP	TP	BUL	BUL	BUL
1	Abu Muslim Amaev (BUL)	2	2	0	8	16	—	10–2	8–0
2	Antonio Hristov (BUL)	2	1	1	6	6	1–4 SU1	—	4–0 Fall
3	Hristiyan Ivanov (BUL)	2	0	2	0	0	0–4 SU	0–5 FA	—

Source: UWW

Pos	Athlete	Pld	W	L	CP	TP	NOR	BUL	UKR
1	Håvard Jørgensen (NOR)	2	2	0	7	14	—	6–0	8–0
2	Nikalas Sulev (BUL)	2	1	1	4	11	0–3 PO	—	11–0
3	Hevorh Arzumanian (UKR)	2	0	2	0	0	0–4 SU	0–4 SU	—

Source: UWW

Semifinals
Abu Muslim Amaev (BUL)	2
Nikalas Sulev (BUL)	1
Håvard Jørgensen (NOR)	9
Antonio Hristov (BUL)	0

Final
Abu Muslim Amaev (BUL)	1
Håvard Jørgensen (NOR)	3
Third place
Nikalas Sulev (BUL)	9
Antonio Hristov (BUL)	0

==== Men's Greco-Roman 72 kg ====
Pos	Athlete	Pld	W	L	CP	TP	IRI	BUL	BUL	BUL
1	Hojat Rezaei (IRI)	3	3	0	12	14	—	8–0	4–3	2–0 Fall
2	Ivo Iliev (BUL)	3	2	1	8	17	0–4 SU	—	10–7 Fall	7–0
3	Petar Gornyashki (BUL)	3	1	2	5	25	1–3 PO1	0–5 FA	—	15–4
4	Dimitar Georgiev (BUL)	3	0	3	1	4	0–5 FA	0–3 PO	1–4 SU1	—

Source: UWW

==== Men's Greco-Roman 77 kg ====
Pos	Athlete	Pld	W	L	CP	TP	NOR	BUL	NOR
1	Per-Anders Kure (NOR)	2	2	0	8	17	—	8–0	9–0
2	Albert Doev (BUL)	2	1	1	3	9	0–4 SU	—	9–4
3	Sebastian Aak (NOR)	2	0	2	1	4	0–4 SU	1–3 PO1	—

Source: UWW

Pos	Athlete	Pld	W	L	CP	TP	NOR	NOR	BUL
1	Ludvig Gunheim-Hatland (NOR)	2	2	0	7	13	—	5–0	8–0
2	Benjamin Hansen (NOR)	2	1	1	3	8	0–3 PO	—	8–1
3	Martin Dimitrov (BUL)	2	0	2	1	1	0–4 SU	1–3 PO1	—

Source: UWW

Semifinals
Per-Anders Kure (NOR)	4
Benjamin Hansen (NOR)	5
Ludvig Gunheim-Hatland (NOR)	0
Albert Doev (BUL)	11

Final
Benjamin Hansen (NOR)	1
Albert Doev (BUL)	5
Third place
Per-Anders Kure (NOR)	6
Ludvig Gunheim-Hatland (NOR)	0

==== Men's Greco-Roman 82 kg ====
Pos	Athlete	Pld	W	L	CP	TP	BUL	BUL	IRI	BUL
1	Aik Mnatsakanian (BUL)	3	3	0	10	18	—	7–0	1–1	10–0
2	Svetoslav Nikolov (BUL)	3	2	1	8	7	0–3 PO	—	3–3	4–0 Fall
3	Mohammad Naghousi (IRI)	3	1	2	6	13	1–3 PO1	1–3 PO1	—	9–0
4	Azis Atanasov (BUL)	3	0	3	0	0	0–4 SU	0–5 FA	0–4 SU	—

Source: UWW

==== Men's Greco-Roman 87 kg ====
Pos	Athlete	Pld	W	L	CP	TP	BUL	IRI	BUL	BUL	BUL
1	Semen Novikov (BUL)	4	4	0	14	31	—	7–4	6–0	8–0	10–2
2	Yasin Yazdi (IRI)	4	3	1	13	28	1–3 PO1	—	6–0	8–0	WO
3	Andrey Atanasov (BUL)	4	2	2	9	8	0–3 PO	0–3 PO	—	8–0	WO
4	Ivan Manov (BUL)	4	1	3	3	1	0–4 SU	0–4 SU	0–4 SU	—	1–1
5	Ivaylo Ivanov (BUL)	4	0	4	2	3	1–4 SU1	0–5 IN	0–5 IN	1–3 PO1	—

Source: UWW

==== Men's Greco-Roman 97 kg ====
Pos	Athlete	Pld	W	L	CP	TP	BUL	BUL	BUL
1	Kiril Milov (BUL)	2	2	0	7	10	—	2–0	8–0
2	Yoan Dimitrov (BUL)	2	1	1	4	8	0–3 PO	—	8–0
3	Dimo Dimov (BUL)	2	0	2	0	0	0–4 SU	0–4 SU	—

Source: UWW

Pos	Athlete	Pld	W	L	CP	TP	BUL	BUL	BUL
1	Kaloyan Ivanov (BUL)	2	2	0	8	16	—	8–0	8–0
2	Dimitar Atanasov (BUL)	2	1	1	3	3	0–4 SU	—	3–0
3	Andranik Nersisyan (BUL)	2	0	2	0	0	0–4 SU	0–3 PO	—

Source: UWW

Semifinals
Kiril Milov (BUL)	8
Dimitar Atanasov (BUL)	0
Kaloyan Ivanov (BUL)	3
Yoan Dimitrov (BUL)	1

Final
Kiril Milov (BUL)	10
Kaloyan Ivanov (BUL)	0
Third place
Dimitar Atanasov (BUL)	0
Yoan Dimitrov (BUL)	12

==== Men's Greco-Roman 130 kg ====
Pos	Athlete	Pld	W	L	CP	TP	IRI	BUL	BUL	BUL
1	Abolfazl Fathi (IRI)	3	3	0	12	21	—	2–1	11–2 Fall	8–0
2	Alan Dzabiev (BUL)	3	2	1	9	18	1–3 PO1	—	9–1	8–0
3	Ignat Milenov (BUL)	3	1	2	4	8	0–5 FA	1–4 SU1	—	5–0
4	Antonio Tahov (BUL)	3	0	3	0	0	0–4 SU	0–4 SU	0–3 PO	—

Source: UWW

=== Women's freestyle ===
==== Women's freestyle 53 kg ====
Pos	Athlete	Pld	W	L	CP	TP	ESP	BUL
1	Aintzane Gorría (ESP)	1	1	0	5	11	—	11–2 Fall
2	Nikol Aleksandrova (BUL)	1	0	1	0	2	0–5 FA	—

Source: UWW

==== Women's freestyle 62 kg ====
Pos	Athlete	Pld	W	L	CP	TP	ESP	BUL	BUL	BUL
1	Lydia Pérez (ESP)	3	3	0	11	23	—	3–1	10–0	10–0
2	Fatme Shaban (BUL)	3	2	1	9	19	1–3 PO1	—	14–4 Fall	4–0
3	Desislava Ivanova (BUL)	3	1	2	3	14	0–4 SU	0–5 FA	—	10–4
4	Emel Mustafova (BUL)	3	0	3	1	4	0–4 SU	0–3 PO	1–3 PO1	—

Source: UWW

==== Women's freestyle 65 kg ====
Pos	Athlete	Pld	W	L	CP	TP	BUL	LAT
1	Bilyana Dudova (BUL)	1	1	0	4	11	—	11–0
2	Elma Zeidlere (LAT)	1	0	1	0	0	0–4 SU	—

Source: UWW

==== Women's freestyle 68 kg ====
Pos	Athlete	Pld	W	L	CP	TP	BUL	BUL
1	Daniela Brasnarova (BUL)	1	1	0	4	11	—	11–0
2	Ilinka Stefanova (BUL)	1	0	1	0	0	0–4 SU	—

Source: UWW

==== Women's freestyle 76 kg ====
Pos	Athlete	Pld	W	L	CP	TP	BUL	BUL
1	Vanesa Georgieva (BUL)	1	1	0	4	10	—	10–0
2	Aleksandra Stoyanova (BUL)	1	0	1	0	0	0–4 SU	—

Source: UWW
