= Grand Prix de France Henri Deglane 2025 =

Henri Deglane Grand Prix 2025
- Host city: Nice, France
- Dates: 17–19 January 2025
- Stadium: Salle Serge Leyrit

Champions
- Freestyle: United States
- Greco-Roman: Ukraine
- Women: Poland

The LI Grand Prix de France Henri Deglane 2025 (also known as Grand Prix of France 2025 and Henri Deglane Grand Prix 2025) was a wrestling event held in Nice, France. It is held in the memory of 1924 Olympic Gold medalist Henri Deglane.

== Medal table ==
* Host nation (France)

Rank	Nation	Gold	Silver	Bronze	Total
1	United States	6	2	2	10
2	Ukraine	5	2	2	9
3	Sweden	3	5	4	12
4	Poland	2	2	4	8
5	Belgium	2	0	1	3
6	Kazakhstan	2	0	0	2
7	France*	1	4	9	14
8	Germany	1	3	5	9
9	Switzerland	1	1	3	5
10	Canada	1	1	2	4
11	Albania	1	1	0	2
12	Czech Republic	1	0	0	1
13	Austria	0	2	2	4
13	Finland	0	2	2	4
15	Estonia	0	1	0	1
16	Denmark	0	0	1	1
16	Ecuador	0	0	1	1
Totals (17 entries)		26	26	38	90

== Team ranking ==
Rank	Men's freestyle		Men's Greco-Roman		Women's freestyle	
Rank	Team	Points	Team	Points	Team	Points
1	United States	205	Ukraine	230	Poland	196
2	France	166	Sweden	228	Germany	140
3	Germany	162	France	100	France	137
4	Switzerland	111	Finland	73	Spain	75
5	Albania	90	Switzerland	64	Sweden	73
6	Belgium	73	Denmark	57	Kazakhstan	50
7	Austria	63	Austria	45	Canada	45
8	Finland	35	Lithuania	30	United States	43
9	Canada	34	Morocco	16	Czech Republic	40
10	Morocco	30	Spain	14	Estonia	20

== Medal overview ==
=== Men's freestyle ===
Event	Gold	Silver	Bronze
57 kg	Spencer Lee; United States	Thomas Epp; Switzerland	Giuseppe Rea; Ecuador
61 kg	Nahshon Garrett; United States	Arman Eloyan; France	Killian Delaney; United States
65 kg	Ayub Musaev; Belgium	Zelimkhan Abakarov; Albania	Peiman Biabani; Canada
65 kg	Ayub Musaev; Belgium	Zelimkhan Abakarov; Albania	Khamzat Arsamerzouev; France
70 kg	Ibragim Veliev; Belgium	Yahya Thomas; United States	Muhammad Abdurachmanov; Belgium
70 kg	Ibragim Veliev; Belgium	Yahya Thomas; United States	Tobias Portmann; Switzerland
74 kg	Chermen Valiev; Albania	Quincy Monday; United States	Adam Thomson; Canada
79 kg	Kennedy Monday; United States	Zelimkhan Khadjiev; France	Saifedine Alekma; France
79 kg	Kennedy Monday; United States	Zelimkhan Khadjiev; France	Lucas Kahnt; Germany
86 kg	Chance Marsteller; United States	Lars Schäfle; Germany	Mohammad Umkhadjiev; France
86 kg	Chance Marsteller; United States	Lars Schäfle; Germany	Miko Elkala; Finland
92 kg	Michael Macchiavello; United States	Adlan Viskhanov; France	Benjamin Greil; Austria
97 kg	no competitors		
125 kg	Gennadij Cudinovic; Germany	Johannes Ludescher; Austria	Jordan Wood; United States

=== Men's Greco-Roman ===
Event	Gold	Silver	Bronze
55 kg	no competitors		
60 kg	Viktor Petryk; Ukraine	Adam Silverin; Sweden	Koriun Sahradian; Ukraine
63 kg	Alexander Vafai; Sweden	Tino Ojala; Finland	Léo Tudezca; France
67 kg	Niklas Öhlén; Sweden	Oleksandr Hrushyn; Ukraine	Yanis Nifri; France
72 kg	Parviz Nasibov; Ukraine	Matias Lipasti; Finland	Ibrahim Ghanem; France
72 kg	Parviz Nasibov; Ukraine	Matias Lipasti; Finland	Michael Portmann; Switzerland
77 kg	Andrii Kulyk; Ukraine	Albin Olofsson; Sweden	Irfan Mirzoiev; Ukraine
77 kg	Andrii Kulyk; Ukraine	Albin Olofsson; Sweden	Adam Strandner; Sweden
82 kg	Ramon Betschart; Switzerland	Ruslan Abdiiev; Ukraine	Alexander Johansson; Sweden
82 kg	Ramon Betschart; Switzerland	Ruslan Abdiiev; Ukraine	Frederik Mathiesen; Denmark
87 kg	Yaroslav Filchakov; Ukraine	Hamza Sertcanli; Sweden	Vladimeri Karchaidze; France
97 kg	Vladlen Kozliuk; Ukraine	Markus Ragginger; Austria	Alex Kessidis; Sweden
97 kg	Vladlen Kozliuk; Ukraine	Markus Ragginger; Austria	Aleksandar Stjepanetic; Sweden
130 kg	Leonhard Junger; Austria	None awarded Only one participant was registered.	

=== Women's freestyle ===
Event	Gold	Silver	Bronze
50 kg	Katie Dutchak; Canada	Madison Parks; Canada	Emma Luttenauer; France
50 kg	Katie Dutchak; Canada	Madison Parks; Canada	Amanda Tomczyk; Poland
53 kg	Katarzyna Krawczyk; Poland	Anastasia Blayvas; Germany	Roksana Zasina; Poland
53 kg	Katarzyna Krawczyk; Poland	Anastasia Blayvas; Germany	Oleksandra Kogut; Austria
55 kg	Tatiana Debien; France	Amory Andrich; Germany	Kamila Kasprów; Poland
57 kg	Jowita Wrzesień; Poland	Evelina Hulthén; Sweden	Magdalena Głodek; Poland
57 kg	Jowita Wrzesień; Poland	Evelina Hulthén; Sweden	Jenna Hemiä; Finland
59 kg	Guldana Bekesh; Kazakhstan	Julia Nowicka; Poland	Luna Rothenberger; Germany
62 kg	Johanna Lindborg; Sweden	Viktoria Vesso; Estonia	Iris Thiébaux; France
62 kg	Johanna Lindborg; Sweden	Viktoria Vesso; Estonia	Annatina Lippuner; Switzerland
65 kg	no competitors		
68 kg	Adéla Hanzlíčková; Czech Republic	Kendra Dacher; France	Gerda Barth; Germany
68 kg	Adéla Hanzlíčková; Czech Republic	Kendra Dacher; France	Sophia Schäfle; Germany
72 kg	Kaylynn Albrecht; United States	Tindra Sjöberg; Sweden	Lilly Schneider; Germany
76 kg	Elmira Syzdykova; Kazakhstan	Partrycja Cuber; Poland	Not awarded as there were only 2 competitors.

== Participating nations ==
209 wrestlers from 22 countries:

1. Albania (2)
2. Austria (10)
3. Belgium (6)
4. Brazil (1)
5. Canada (5)
6. Cape Verde (1)
7. Czech Republic (2)
8. Denmark (5)
9. Ecuador (1)
10. Spain (10)
11. Finland (9)
12. France (34) (Host)
13. Germany (28)
14. Kazakhstan (2)
15. Lithuania (4)
16. Morocco (6)
17. Netherlands (2)
18. Poland (14)
19. Switzerland (18)
20. Sweden (20)
21. Ukraine (13)
22. United States (13)

== Results ==
=== Men's freestyle ===
==== Men's freestyle 57 kg ====
Pos	Athlete	Pld	W	L	CP	TP	USA	MAR	FRA	SUI
1	Spencer Lee (USA)	3	3	0	12	30	—	10–0	10–0	10–0
2	Ben Hachem Tarik (MAR)	3	2	1	7	22	0–4 SU	—	7–3	15–4
3	Gaspard Cheynoux (FRA)	3	1	2	5	14	0–4 SU	1–3 PO1	—	11–0
4	Sayed Jamshidi (SUI)	3	0	3	1	4	0–4 SU	1–4 SU1	0–4 SU	—

Source: UWW

Pos	Athlete	Pld	W	L	CP	TP	SUI	ECU	BRA
1	Thomas Epp (SUI)	2	2	0	7	12	—	2–1	10–0
2	Guesseppe Rea (ECU)	2	1	1	5	14	1–3 PO1	—	13–2
3	Davi Giovanetti (BRA)	2	0	2	1	2	0–4 SU	1–4 VSU1	—

Source: UWW

Semifinals
Spencer Lee (USA)	10
Guesseppe Rea (ECU)	9
Ben Hachem Tarik (MAR)	6
Thomas Epp (SUI)	7

Final
Spencer Lee (USA)	10
Thomas Epp (SUI)	0
Third place
Guesseppe Rea (ECU)	11
Ben Hachem Tarik (MAR)	6

==== Men's freestyle 61 kg ====
Pos	Athlete	Pld	W	L	CP	TP	USA	FRA	SUI	GER
1	Nahshon Garrett (USA)	3	3	0	12	34	—	13–3	10–0	11–0
2	Arman Eloyan (FRA)	3	2	1	7	25	1–4 SU1	—	8–1	11–0
3	Nils Leutert (SUI)	3	1	2	4	6	0–4 SU	1–3 PO1	—	5–4
4	Konstantin Valassis (GER)	3	0	3	1	4	0–4 SU	0–4 SU	1–3 PO1	—

Source: UWW

Pos	Athlete	Pld	W	L	CP	TP	USA	SUI	GER
1	Killian Delaney (USA)	2	2	0	9	19	—	9–2 Fall	10–0
2	River Perlungher (SUI)	2	1	1	3	16	0–5 FA	—	14–14
3	Dario Dittrich (GER)	2	0	2	1	14	0–4 SU	1–3 PO1	—

Source: UWW

Semifinals
Nahshon Garrett (USA)	10
River Perlungher (SUI)	0
Arman Eloyan (FRA)	11
Killian Delaney (USA)	0

Final
Nahshon Garrett (USA)	11
Arman Eloyan (FRA)	1
Third place
River Perlungher (SUI)	0
Killian Delaney (USA)	10

==== Men's freestyle 65 kg ====
Round of 16
Zelimkhan Abakarov (ALB)	9
Nino Leutert (SUI)	2
Marcel Wagin (GER)	0
Khamzat Arsamerzouev (FRA)	5
Moritz Langer (GER)	1
Marwane Yezza (FRA)	9
Nico Megerle (GER)	6
Quentin Sticker (FRA)	3

Quarterfinals
Zelimkhan Abakarov (ALB)	12
Jannis Rebholz (GER)	1
Khamzat Arsamerzouev (FRA)	0
Peiman Biabani (CAN)	6
Marwane Yezza (FRA)	13
Carlos Álvarez (ESP)	2
Nico Megerle (GER)	1
Ayub Musaev (BEL)	3

Semifinals
Zelimkhan Abakarov (ALB)	6
Peiman Biabani (CAN)	1
Marwane Yezza (FRA)	2
Ayub Musaev (BEL)	10

Final
Zelimkhan Abakarov (ALB)	1
Ayub Musaev (BEL)	6

Repechage 2 of 4
Nino Leutert (SUI)	5
Nico Megerle (GER)	6
Marcel Wagin (GER)	11
Carlos Álvarez (ESP)	3
Moritz Langer (GER)	0
Khamzat Arsamerzouev (FRA)	10
Quentin Sticker (FRA)	10
Jannis Rebholz (GER)	0

Repechage 3 of 4
Nico Megerle (GER)	4
Marcel Wagin (GER)	1
Khamzat Arsamerzouev (FRA)	10
Quentin Sticker (FRA)	2

Bronze medals
Nico Megerle (GER)	0
Peiman Biabani (CAN)	6
Khamzat Arsamerzouev (FRA)	4
Marwane Yezza (FRA)	0

==== Men's freestyle 70 kg ====
Round of 16
Tobias Portmann (SUI)	2
Benedikt Huber (AUT)	2
Yahya Thomas (USA)	5
Muhammad Abdurachmanov (BEL)	0
Florian Bissig (SUI)	0
Ibragim Veliev (BEL)	10

Quarterfinals
Tobias Portmann (SUI)	0
Kevin Henkel (GER)	11
Yahya Thomas (USA)	11
Saúl Bello (ESP)	0
Ibragim Veliev (BEL)	12
Leon Rul (GER)	2
Burak Emin Salviz (GER)	13
Alexander Seiwald (AUT)	2

Semifinals
Kevin Henkel (GER)	3
Yahya Thomas (USA)	5
Ibragim Veliev (BEL)	10
Burak Emin Salviz (GER)	0

Final
Yahya Thomas (USA)	3
Ibragim Veliev (BEL)	3

Repechage 2 of 4
Benedikt Huber (AUT)	2
Alexander Seiwald (AUT)	4
Muhammad Abdurachmanov (BEL)	10
Leon Rul (GER)	0
Florian Bissig (SUI)	14
Saúl Bello (ESP)	4

Repechage 3 of 4
Alexander Seiwald (AUT)	0
Muhammad Abdurachmanov (BEL)	10
Florian Bissig (SUI)	0
Tobias Portmann (SUI)	9

Bronze medals
Muhammad Abdurachmanov (BEL)	4
Kevin Henkel (GER)	3
Tobias Portmann (SUI)	7
Burak Emin Salviz (GER)	1

==== Men's freestyle 74 kg ====
Pos	Athlete	Pld	W	L	CP	TP	USA	CAN	GER
1	Quincy Monday (USA)	2	2	0	7	13	—	2–1	11–0
2	Adam Thomson (CAN)	2	1	1	4	12	1–3 PO1	—	11–2
3	Dennis Aleksandryuk (GER)	2	0	2	1	2	0–4 SU	1–3 PO1	—

Source: UWW

Pos	Athlete	Pld	W	L	CP	TP	ALB	MAR	FRA
1	Chermen Valiev (ALB)	2	2	0	7	18	—	10–0	8–2
2	Rayanne Essaidi (MAR)	2	1	1	3	4	0–4 SU	—	4–0
3	Abdoul-Malek Nakaev (FRA)	2	0	2	1	2	1–3 PO1	0–3 PO	—

Source: UWW

Semifinals
Quincy Monday (USA)	10
Rayanne Essaidi (MAR)	1
Adam Thomson (CAN)	0
Chermen Valiev (ALB)	10

Final
Quincy Monday (USA)	2
Chermen Valiev (ALB)	12
Third place
Rayanne Essaidi (MAR)	0
Adam Thomson (CAN)	11

==== Men's freestyle 79 kg ====
Round of 16
Gregor Eigenbrodt (GER)	7
Saifedine Alekma (FRA)	11
Umar Mavlaev (SUI)	3
Kennedy Monday (USA)	3
Lucas Kahnt (GER)	7
Adam Kakhriev (FRA)	2
Richard Schröder (GER)	0
Zelimkhan Khadjiev (FRA)	10
Simon Marchl (AUT)	10
Bogdan Djandigov (BEL)	0
Kimi Käppeli (SUI)	0
Sam Barmish (CAN)	10

Quarterfinals
Saifedine Alekma (FRA)	0
Kennedy Monday (USA)	11
Lucas Kahnt (GER)	12
Mukhammad Inshapiev (AUT)	6
Zelimkhan Khadjiev (FRA)	9^{F}
Simon Marchl (AUT)	0
Sam Barmish (CAN)	2
Joona Vuoti (FIN)	12

Semifinals
Kennedy Monday (USA)	6
Lucas Kahnt (GER)	6
Zelimkhan Khadjiev (FRA)	11
Joona Vuoti (FIN)	0

Final
Kennedy Monday (USA)	13
Zelimkhan Khadjiev (FRA)	9

Repechage 1 of 4
Gregor Eigenbrodt (GER)	4
Umar Mavlaev (SUI)	4
Richard Schröder (GER)	3
Bogdan Djandigov (BEL)	1

Repechage 2 of 4
Umar Mavlaev (SUI)	11
Sam Barmish (CAN)	1
Adam Kakhriev (FRA)	8
Simon Marchl (AUT)	6
Richard Schröder (GER)	4
Mukhammad Inshapiev (AUT)	2^{R}
Kimi Käppeli (SUI)	0
Saifedine Alekma (FRA)	10

Repechage 3 of 4
Umar Mavlaev (SUI)	4
Adam Kakhriev (FRA)	0
Richard Schröder (GER)	1
Saifedine Alekma (FRA)	4

Bronze medals
Umar Mavlaev (SUI)	2
Lucas Kahnt (GER)	5
Saifedine Alekma (FRA)	6
Joona Vuoti (FIN)	2

==== Men's freestyle 86 kg ====
Round of 16
Chance Marsteller (USA)	10
Ayman Nissr (GER)	0

Quarterfinals
Chance Marsteller (USA)	8^{F}
Miko Elkala (FIN)	2
Paulius Leščauskas (LTU)	8
Umar Veliev (BEL)	7
Lukas Lins (AUT)	2
Matteo Monteiro (CPV)	6
Mohammad Umkhadjiev (FRA)	3
Lars Schäfle (GER)	5

Semifinals
Chance Marsteller (USA)	10
Paulius Leščauskas (LTU)	0
Matteo Monteiro (CPV)	1
Lars Schäfle (GER)	4

Final
Chance Marsteller (USA)	2
Lars Schäfle (GER)	0^{R}

Repechage 2 of 4
Ayman Nissr (GER)	0
Mohammad Umkhadjiev (FRA)	11^{F}

Repechage 3 of 4
Mohammad Umkhadjiev (FRA)	11
Lukas Lins (AUT)	0
Umar Veliev (BEL)	6
Miko Elkala (FIN)	8

Bronze medals
Mohammad Umkhadjiev (FRA)	7^{F}
Paulius Leščauskas (LTU)	0
Miko Elkala (FIN)	8
Matteo Monteiro (CPV)	0

==== Men's freestyle 92 kg ====
Pos	Athlete	Pld	W	L	CP	TP	USA	AUT	GER	FIN
1	Michael Macchiavello (USA)	3	3	0	12	21	—	9–0	12–2	WO
2	Benjamin Greil (AUT)	3	2	1	9	12	0–3 PO	—	12–2	WO
3	Alexander Weiß (GER)	3	1	2	7	4	1–4 SU1	1–4 SU1	—	WO
—	Juho Ruusila (FIN)	3	0	3	0	0	0–5 FO	0–5 FO	0–5 FO	—

Source: UWW

Pos	Athlete	Pld	W	L	CP	TP	FRA	SUI	USA
1	Adlan Viskhanov (FRA)	2	2	0	7	17	—	10–0	7–2
2	Samuel Scherrer (SUI)	2	1	1	3	1	0–4 SU	—	1–0
3	Jack Wehmeyer (USA)	2	0	2	1	2	1–3 PO1	0–3 PO	—

Source: UWW

Semifinals
Michael Macchiavello (USA)	7
Samuel Scherrer (SUI)	0
Benjamin Greil (AUT)	2
Adlan Viskhanov (FRA)	5

Final
Michael Macchiavello (USA)	8
Adlan Viskhanov (FRA)	2
Third place
Samuel Scherrer (SUI)	4
Benjamin Greil (AUT)	6

==== Men's freestyle 125 kg ====
Pos	Athlete	Pld	W	L	CP	TP	GER	AUT	USA	FRA
1	Gennadij Cudinovic (GER)	3	3	0	11	26	—	2–1	6–3	10–1 Fall
2	Johannes Ludescher (AUT)	3	2	1	7	13	1–3 PO1	—	5–1	7–0
3	Jordan Wood (USA)	3	1	2	6	15	1–3 PO1	1–3 PO1	—	11–0
4	Levan Lagvilava (FRA)	3	0	3	0	1	0–5 FA	0–3 PO	0–4 SU	—

Source: UWW

=== Men's Greco-Roman ===
==== Men's Greco-Roman 60 kg ====
Pos	Athlete	Pld	W	L	CP	TP	UKR	SWE	ESP
1	Koriun Sahradian (UKR)	2	2	0	6	7	—	3–1	4–0
2	Adam Silverin (SWE)	2	1	1	5	9	1–3 PO1	—	8–0
3	Daniel Bobillo (ESP)	2	0	2	0	0	0–3 PO	0–4 SU	—

Source: UWW

Pos	Athlete	Pld	W	L	CP	TP	DEN	UKR	FRA
1	Brian Kurt Santiago (DEN)	2	2	0	6	4	—	1–1	3–1
2	Viktor Petryk (UKR)	2	1	1	4	7	1–3 PO1	—	6–5
3	Lucas Lo Grasso (FRA)	2	0	2	2	6	1–3 PO1	1–3 PO1	—

Source: UWW

Semifinals
Koriun Sahradian (UKR)	1
Viktor Petryk (UKR)	3
Adam Silverin (SWE)	10
Brian Kurt Santiago (DEN)	0

Final
Viktor Petryk (UKR)	9
Adam Silverin (SWE)	0
Third place
Koriun Sahradian (UKR)	2
Brian Kurt Santiago (DEN)	0

==== Men's Greco-Roman 63 kg ====
Pos	Athlete	Pld	W	L	CP	TP	SWE	FIN	FRA	UKR	FRA
1	Alexander Vafai (SWE)	4	3	1	12	33	—	8–1	11–2	0–6	11–0 Fall
2	Tino Ojala (FIN)	4	3	1	14	27	1–3 PO1	—	4–0 Fall	9–0	11–0
3	Léo Tudezca (FRA)	4	2	2	8	23	1–4 SU1	0–5 FA	—	11–2	9–8
4	Andrii Semenchuk (UKR)	4	2	2	9	15	3–0 PO	0–4 SU	1–4 SU1	—	7–0 Fall
5	Ilian Ainaoui (FRA)	4	0	4	1	8	0–5 FA	0–4 SU	1–3 PO1	0–5 FA	—

Source: UWW

==== Men's Greco-Roman 67 kg ====
Pos	Athlete	Pld	W	L	CP	TP	UKR	DEN	SWE
1	Oleksandr Hrushyn (UKR)	2	2	0	6	11	—	5–4	6–0
2	William Reenberg (DEN)	2	1	1	4	5	1–3 PO1	—	1–1
3	Tim Bergfalk (SWE)	2	0	2	1	1	0–3 PO	1–3 PO1	—

Source: UWW

Pos	Athlete	Pld	W	L	CP	TP	SWE	FRA	LTU
1	Niklas Öhlén (SWE)	2	1	1	6	10	—	3–3	7–0 Ret
2	Yanis Nifri (FRA)	2	1	1	4	7	3–1 PO1	—	4–6
3	Adomas Grigaliūnas (LTU)	2	1	1	3	6	0–5 IN	3–1 PO1	—

Source: UWW

Semifinals
Oleksandr Hrushyn (UKR)	2
Yanis Nifri (FRA)	0
William Reenberg (DEN)	1
Niklas Öhlén (SWE)	3

Final
Oleksandr Hrushyn (UKR)	1
Niklas Öhlén (SWE)	3
Third place
Yanis Nifri (FRA)	3
William Reenberg (DEN)	1

==== Men's Greco-Roman 72 kg ====
Round of 16
Matias Lipasti (FIN)	4
Rokas Čepauskas (LTU)	0
Maurus Zogg (SUI)	2^{F}
Yassine Chekly (MAR)	5
Ibrahim Ghanem (FRA)	9
Georgios Barbanos (SWE)	0
Hocine Akli Berc (FRA)	0
Parviz Nasibov (UKR)	8
Naïm Bolaky-Meïte (FRA)	1
Christoffer Dahlén (SWE)	5

Quarterfinals
Matias Lipasti (FIN)	9
Maurus Zogg (SUI)	0
Ibrahim Ghanem (FRA)	1
Michael Portmann (SUI)	10
Parviz Nasibov (UKR)	11
Andreas Vetsch (SUI)	2
Christoffer Dahlén (SWE)	8
Rasmus Ulriksen (DEN)	0

Semifinals
Matias Lipasti (FIN)	6
Michael Portmann (SUI)	4
Parviz Nasibov (UKR)	9
Christoffer Dahlén (SWE)	0

Final
Matias Lipasti (FIN)	1
Parviz Nasibov (UKR)	3

Repechage 1 of 4
Rokas Čepauskas (LTU)	4^{F}
Yassine Chekly (MAR)	1

Repechage 2 of 4
Rokas Čepauskas (LTU)	11
Rasmus Ulriksen (DEN)	0
Georgios Barbanos (SWE)	0
Andreas Vetsch (SUI)	5
Hocine Akli Berc (FRA)	4
Ibrahim Ghanem (FRA)	12
Naïm Bolaky-Meïte (FRA)	6
Maurus Zogg (SUI)	3

Repechage 3 of 4
Rokas Čepauskas (LTU)	3
Andreas Vetsch (SUI)	1
Ibrahim Ghanem (FRA)	8
Naïm Bolaky-Meïte (FRA)	0

Bronze medals
Rokas Čepauskas (LTU)	1
Michael Portmann (SUI)	3
Ibrahim Ghanem (FRA)	6
Christoffer Dahlén (SWE)	0

==== Men's Greco-Roman 77 kg ====
Round of 16
David Loher (SUI)	0
Adam Strandner (SWE)	9

Quarterfinals
Adam Strandner (SWE)	2
Erik Persson (SWE)	1
Irfan Mirzoiev (UKR)	3
Albin Olofsson (SWE)	7
Andrii Kulyk (UKR)	3
Hugo Baff (SWE)	1
Akseli Yli-Hannuksela (FIN)	5
Simon Borkenhagen (SWE)	1

Semifinals
Adam Strandner (SWE)	1
Albin Olofsson (SWE)	3
Andrii Kulyk (UKR)	7
Akseli Yli-Hannuksela (FIN)	0

Final
Albin Olofsson (SWE)	1
Andrii Kulyk (UKR)	5

Repechage 2 of 4
David Loher (SUI)	0
Simon Borkenhagen (SWE)	8

Repechage 3 of 4
Simon Borkenhagen (SWE)	3
Hugo Baff (SWE)	4
Irfan Mirzoiev (UKR)	7
Erik Persson (SWE)	0

Bronze medals
Hugo Baff (SWE)	1
Adam Strandner (SWE)	1
Irfan Mirzoiev (UKR)	4
Akseli Yli-Hannuksela (FIN)	3

==== Men's Greco-Roman 82 kg ====
Round of 16
Frederik Mathiesen (DEN)	3
Artem Shapovalov (FIN)	7
Ibrahim Tabaev (BEL)	5
William Gustafsson (SWE)	3
Ramon Betschart (SUI)	9
Brandon Guiadem Kamdem (FRA)	0
Volodymyr Yakovliev (UKR)	8
Alexander Johansson (SWE)	3

Quarterfinals
Artem Shapovalov (FIN)	0
Ruslan Abdiiev (UKR)	8
Ibrahim Tabaev (BEL)	8^{F}
Elias Chiguer (MAR)	3
Ramon Betschart (SUI)	9
Andrés González (ESP)	0
Volodymyr Yakovliev (UKR)	7
Otto Ketonen (FIN)	0

Semifinals
Ruslan Abdiiev (UKR)	5
Ibrahim Tabaev (BEL)	0
Ramon Betschart (SUI)	5^{F}
Volodymyr Yakovliev (UKR)	4

Final
Ruslan Abdiiev (UKR)	1
Ramon Betschart (SUI)	1

Repechage 2 of 4
Frederik Mathiesen (DEN)	7^{F}
Otto Ketonen (FIN)	5
William Gustafsson (SWE)	7
Andrés González (ESP)	4
Brandon Guiadem Kamdem (FRA)	3
Elias Chiguer (MAR)	3
Alexander Johansson (SWE)	7
Artem Shapovalov (FIN)	0

Repechage 3 of 4
Frederik Mathiesen (DEN)	2
William Gustafsson (SWE)	1
Elias Chiguer (MAR)	0
Alexander Johansson (SWE)	8

Bronze medals
Frederik Mathiesen (DEN)	3
Ibrahim Tabaev (BEL)	1
Alexander Johansson (SWE)	6
Volodymyr Yakovliev (UKR)	0

==== Men's Greco-Roman 87 kg ====
Pos	Athlete	Pld	W	L	CP	TP	UKR	SWE	FRA	FIN	NED
1	Yaroslav Filchakov (UKR)	4	4	0	16	8	—	3–1	5–3	0–3 Ret	WO
2	Hamza Sertcanli (SWE)	4	3	1	12	16	1–3 PO1	—	9–7	6–1	WO
3	Vladimeri Karchaidze (FRA)	4	2	2	10	22	1–3 PO1	1–3 PO1	—	5–5	7–0
4	Waltteri Latvala (FIN)	4	1	3	7	15	0–5 IN	1–3 PO1	1–3 PO1	—	WO
5	Marcel Sterkenburg (NED)	4	0	4	0	0	0–5 IN	0–5 IN	0–3 PO	0–5 IN	—

Source: UWW

==== Men's Greco-Roman 97 kg ====
Round of 16
Mindaugas Venckaitis (LTU)	1
Alex Kessidis (SWE)	5
Ihor Kholodnyi (UKR)	0
Christian Zemp (SUI)	9
Loïc Samen (FRA)	7
Tyrone Sterkenburg (NED)	5
Wissam Kouainso (MAR)	10
Aleksandar Stjepanetic (SWE)	0
Jonas Johansen (DEN)	1
Delian Alishahi (SUI)	10

Quarterfinals
Alex Kessidis (SWE)	4^{F}
Christian Zemp (SUI)	0
Loïc Samen (FRA)	1
Vladlen Kozlyuk (UKR)	6
Wissam Kouainso (MAR)	1
Serhii Omelin (UKR)	3
Delian Alishahi (SUI)	0
Markus Ragginger (AUT)	8

Semifinals
Alex Kessidis (SWE)	6
Vladlen Kozlyuk (UKR)	15
Serhii Omelin (UKR)	1
Markus Ragginger (AUT)	3

Final
Vladlen Kozlyuk (UKR)	5
Markus Ragginger (AUT)	1

Repechage 1 of 4
Mindaugas Venckaitis (LTU)	8
Ihor Kholodnyi (UKR)	0

Repechage 2 of 4
Mindaugas Venckaitis (LTU)	3
Delian Alishahi (SUI)	2
Tyrone Sterkenburg (NED)
Wissam Kouainso (MAR)	WO
Aleksandar Stjepanetic (SWE)	4
Loïc Samen (FRA)	2
Jonas Johansen (DEN)	13
Christian Zemp (SUI)	7

Repechage 3 of 4
Mindaugas Venckaitis (LTU)	8
Wissam Kouainso (MAR)	0
Aleksandar Stjepanetic (SWE)	4^{F}
Jonas Johansen (DEN)	2

Bronze medals
Mindaugas Venckaitis (LTU)	1
Alex Kessidis (SWE)	5
Aleksandar Stjepanetic (SWE)	4
Serhii Omelin (UKR)	1

==== Men's Greco-Roman 130 kg ====
Pos	Athlete	Pld	W	L	CP	TP	AUT
1	Leonhard Junger (AUT)	0	0	0	0	0	—

Source: UWW

=== Women's freestyle ===
==== Women's freestyle 50 kg ====
Quarterfinals		Semifinals		Final
Amanda Tomczyk (POL)	0
Katie Dutchak (CAN)	8^{F}	Katie Dutchak (CAN)	14
Emma Luttenauer (FRA)	14	Emma Luttenauer (FRA)	2
Ana Torres (ESP)	4			Katie Dutchak (CAN)	WO
Joséphine Haemmerlé (FRA)	2			Madison Parks (CAN)
Madison Parks (CAN)	7	Madison Parks (CAN)	11^{F}
Juliette Lescure (FRA)	3	Juliette Lescure (FRA)	0
María Cazalla (ESP)	2

Repechage 1 of 2
Amanda Tomczyk (POL)	5
Ana Torres (ESP)	4
Joséphine Haemmerlé (FRA)	10
María Cazalla (ESP)	10

Bronze medals
Amanda Tomczyk (POL)	3
Juliette Lescure (FRA)	0
María Cazalla (ESP)	1
Emma Luttenauer (FRA)	9

==== Women's freestyle 53 kg ====
Round of 16
Tetiana Profatilova (FRA)	0
Roksana Zasina (POL)	10
Laurie Lesaffre (FRA)	9
Ellen Östman (SWE)	1
Maëlyss Rousselet (FRA)	2
Anastasiia Lebedieva (POL)	3
Katharina Krupna (GER)	0
Oleksandra Kogut (AUT)	10

Quarterfinals
Roksana Zasina (POL)	8
Anastasia Blayvas (GER)	9
Laurie Lesaffre (FRA)	0
Victoria Báez (ESP)	4^{F}
Anastasiia Lebedieva (POL)	0
Tiare Ikei (USA)	10
Oleksandra Kogut (AUT)	4
Katarzyna Krawczyk (POL)	9

Semifinals
Anastasia Blayvas (GER)	4^{F}
Victoria Báez (ESP)	0
Tiare Ikei (USA)	17
Katarzyna Krawczyk (POL)	10^{F}

Final
Anastasia Blayvas (GER)	8
Katarzyna Krawczyk (POL)	11

Repechage 2 of 4
Tetiana Profatilova (FRA)	0
Oleksandra Kogut (AUT)	10
Ellen Östman (SWE)	3
Anastasiia Lebedieva (POL)	2
Maëlyss Rousselet (FRA)	5
Laurie Lesaffre (FRA)	2
Katharina Krupna (GER)	0
Roksana Zasina (POL)	10

Repechage 3 of 4
Oleksandra Kogut (AUT)	4
Ellen Östman (SWE)	0
Maëlyss Rousselet (FRA)	0
Roksana Zasina (POL)	10

Bronze medals
Oleksandra Kogut (AUT)	2
Victoria Báez (ESP)	1
Roksana Zasina (POL)	8
Tiare Ikei (USA)	3

==== Women's freestyle 55 kg ====
Pos	Athlete	Pld	W	L	CP	TP	POL	ESP	FRA
1	Kamila Kasprów (POL)	2	1	1	4	0	—	11–4	7–7
2	Carla Jaume (ESP)	2	1	1	4	0	1–3 PO1	—	9–4
3	Lilya Cohen (FRA)	2	1	1	4	11	3–1 PO1	1–3 PO1	—

Source: UWW

Pos	Athlete	Pld	W	L	CP	TP	FRA	GER	MAR
1	Tatiana Debien (FRA)	2	2	0	8	14	—	7–0	7–0 Fall
2	Amory Andrich (GER)	2	1	1	5	7	0–3 PO	—	7–0 Fall
3	Sara Ettaki (MAR)	2	0	2	0	0	0–5 FA	0–5 FA	—

Source: UWW

Semifinals
Kamila Kasprów (POL)	2
Amory Andrich (GER)	9
Carla Jaume (ESP)	4
Tatiana Debien (FRA)	9^{F}

Final
Amory Andrich (GER)	1
Tatiana Debien (FRA)	9
Third place
Kamila Kasprów (POL)	18
Carla Jaume (ESP)	15

==== Women's freestyle 57 kg ====
Quarterfinals		Semifinals		Final
Graciela Sánchez (ESP)	1
Magdalena Głodek (POL)	6	Magdalena Głodek (POL)	1
Jowita Wrzesień (POL)	10	Jowita Wrzesień (POL)	2
Céleste Sion (FRA)	0			Jowita Wrzesień (POL)	4
Jenna Hemiä (FIN)	10			Evelina Hulthén (SWE)	4
Patrycja Strzelczyk (POL)	0	Jenna Hemiä (FIN)	0
Nikola Wiśniewska (POL)	0	Evelina Hulthén (SWE)	11
Evelina Hulthén (SWE)	10

Repechage 1 of 2
Graciela Sánchez (ESP)	3
Céleste Sion (FRA)	2
Patrycja Strzelczyk (POL)	4
Nikola Wiśniewska (POL)	1

Bronze medals
Graciela Sánchez (ESP)	4
Jenna Hemiä (FIN)	6
Patrycja Strzelczyk (POL)	0
Magdalena Głodek (POL)	3

==== Women's freestyle 59 kg ====
Pos	Athlete	Pld	W	L	CP	TP	KAZ	GER	POL
1	Guldana Bekesh (KAZ)	2	2	0	8	7	—	5–0 Fall	2–1
2	Luna Rothenberger (GER)	2	1	1	5	2	0–5 FA	—	2–2
3	Aleksandra Witos (POL)	2	0	2	1	3	1–3 PO1	1–3 PO1	—

Source: UWW

Pos	Athlete	Pld	W	L	CP	TP	POL	CZE	GER
1	Julia Nowicka (POL)	2	2	0	6	6	—	3–2	3–3
2	Anna Michalcová (CZE)	2	1	1	4	5	1–3 PO1	—	3–3
3	Marie Trayer (GER)	2	0	2	2	6	1–3 PO1	1–3 PO1	—

Source: UWW

Semifinals
Guldana Bekesh (KAZ)	6
Anna Michalcová (CZE)	6
Luna Rothenberger (GER)	2
Julia Nowicka (POL)	4

Final
Guldana Bekesh (KAZ)	3
Julia Nowicka (POL)	1
Third place
Anna Michalcová (CZE)	2
Luna Rothenberger (GER)	5^{F}

==== Women's freestyle 62 kg ====
Round of 16
Améline Douarre (FRA)	10
Skylar Hattendorf (USA)	0
Iris Thiébaux (FRA)	2
Lydia Pérez (ESP)	1

Quarterfinals
Améline Douarre (FRA)	3
Naemi Leistner (GER)	0
Alicja Nowosad (POL)	0
Viktoria Vesso (EST)	4^{F}
Iris Thiébaux (FRA)	0
Annatina Lippuner (SUI)	11
Olha Padoshyk (POL)	2
Johanna Lindborg (SWE)	12

Semifinals
Améline Douarre (FRA)	2
Viktoria Vesso (EST)	6^{F}
Annatina Lippuner (SUI)	0
Johanna Lindborg (SWE)	10^{F}

Final
Viktoria Vesso (EST)	0
Johanna Lindborg (SWE)	2^{F}

Repechage 2 of 4
Skylar Hattendorf (USA)	10
Olha Padoshyk (POL)	2
Lydia Pérez (ESP)	5
Alicja Nowosad (POL)	6

Repechage 3 of 4
Skylar Hattendorf (USA)	1
Iris Thiébaux (FRA)	6
Alicja Nowosad (POL)	4
Naemi Leistner (GER)	2

Bronze medals
Iris Thiébaux (FRA)	WO
Améline Douarre (FRA)
Alicja Nowosad (POL)	3
Annatina Lippuner (SUI)	9

==== Women's freestyle 68 kg ====
Quarterfinals		Semifinals		Final
Adéla Hanzlíčková (CZE)	8^{F}
Sophia Schäfle (GER)	0	Adéla Hanzlíčková (CZE)	10
Marta Ojeda (ESP)	2	Gerda Barth (GER)	0
Gerda Barth (GER)	8			Adéla Hanzlíčková (CZE)	8
Nerea Pampín (ESP)	6			Kendra Dacher (FRA)	8
Lena Rösler (GER)	1	Nerea Pampín (ESP)	0
Cassidy Richter (GER)	0	Kendra Dacher (FRA)	11
Kendra Dacher (FRA)	10

Repechage 1 of 2
Sophia Schäfle (GER)	8^{F}
Marta Ojeda (ESP)	0
Lena Rösler (GER)	5
Cassidy Richter (GER)	2

Bronze medals
Sophia Schäfle (GER)	8^{F}
Nerea Pampín (ESP)	0
Lena Rösler (GER)	0
Gerda Barth (GER)	10

==== Women's freestyle 72 kg ====
Pos	Athlete	Pld	W	L	CP	TP	USA	SWE	GER
1	Kaylynn Albrecht (USA)	2	2	0	8	18	—	9–2 Fall	9–7
2	Tindra Sjöberg (SWE)	2	1	1	3	5	0–5 FA	—	3–2
3	Lilly Schneider (GER)	2	0	2	2	9	1–3 PO1	1–3 PO1	—

Source: UWW

==== Women's freestyle 76 kg ====
Pos	Athlete	Pld	W	L	CP	TP	IND	TUN
1	Elmira Syzdykova (KAZ)	1	1	0	4	10	—	10–0
2	Patrycja Cuber (POL)	1	0	1	0	0	0–4 SU	—

Source: UWW
