= Chance Marsteller =

American wrestler (born 1995)

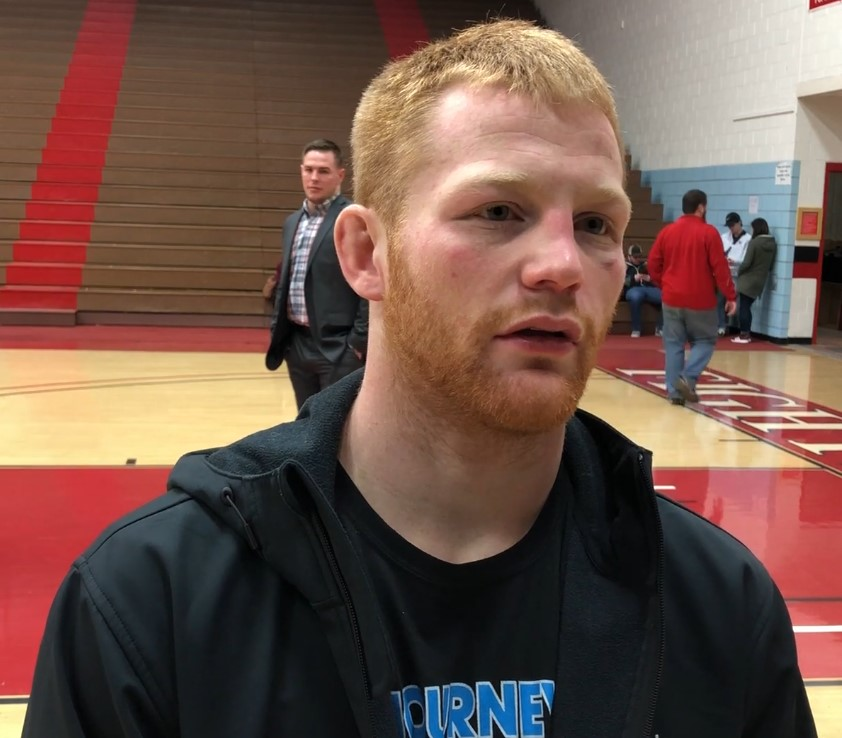
- Marsteller in 2018

Personal information
- Full name: Chandler Shane Marsteller
- Born: July 9, 1995 (age 31) Altoona, Pennsylvania, U.S.
- Home town: New Park, Pennsylvania, U.S.
- Relative: John Stefanowicz (brother)
- Website: stellertrainedllc.com

Sport
- Country: United States
- Sport: Wrestling
- Events: Freestyle and Folkstyle
- College team: Lock Haven, Oklahoma State
- Club: Titan Mercury Wrestling Club
- Team: USA
- Coached by: Kendall Cross, Reece Humphrey
Medal record
Men's freestyle wrestling
Representing the United States
World Cup
Gold medal – first place	2022 Coralville	Team
Pan American Championships
Gold medal – first place	2024 Acapulco	86 kg
Grand Prix
Gold medal – first place	2022 New York City	79 kg
Gold medal – first place	2024 Madrid	86 kg
Gold medal – first place	2025 Tirana	86 kg
Gold medal – first place	2025 Nice	86 kg
Silver medal – second place	2022 Istanbul	79 kg
Silver medal – second place	2025 Varna	86 kg
Bronze medal – third place	2022 Tunisia	79 kg
Bronze medal – third place	2023 Budapest	79 kg
Bronze medal – third place	2023 Alexandria	79 kg
Bronze medal – third place	2023 Zagreb	79 kg
Bronze medal – third place	2024 Zagreb	86 kg
US Open Championships
Gold medal – first place	2023 Las Vegas	79 kg
Silver medal – second place	2019 Las Vegas	79 kg
Bronze medal – third place	2025 Las Vegas	86 kg
Men's collegiate wrestling
Representing the Lock Haven Bald Eagles
NCAA Division I Championships
Bronze medal – third place	2019 Pittsburgh	165 lb
EWL Championships
Gold medal – first place	2018 Edinboro	165 lb
Gold medal – first place	2019 Fairfax	165 lb

Chandler Shane "Chance" Marsteller (born July 9, 1995) is an American freestyle wrestler and graduated folkstyle wrestler. In college, he competed at Oklahoma State, before transferring to Lock Haven. While at Lock Haven, he was a two-time NCAA Division I All-American. On the senior level circuit, Marsteller represented the United States at the 2023 World Championships in men's freestyle wrestling at 79 kg.

== Early life ==
Marsteller attended Kennard-Dale High School in Fawn Grove, Pennsylvania. As a high school wrestler, he compiled a 166–0 record, winning four PIAA class AAA state championships. He also won two Super 32 championships, four Powerade titles, and three Cadet USA Wrestling Asics/Vaughan national championships, two in freestyle and one in Greco-Roman. In 2012, he was crowned the FILA Cadet freestyle national champion, earning him a spot on the United States Cadet World Team at the 2012 Cadet World Championships in Azerbaijan. In 2014, he was honored with the Junior Hodge Trophy Award and Dave Schultz High School Excellence Award.

== College career ==
=== Oklahoma State ===
As the nation's No. 1 recruit in the Class of 2014, Marsteller signed with Oklahoma State University. He redshirted his first season in 2014–15, compiling a 14–4 overall record and picking up two wins over ranked opponents. He made his Oklahoma State debut on November 14, 2015, before 42,287 fans at Iowa's Kinnick Stadium, winning his dual meet match with a 14–11 score. He finished his redshirt freshman 2015–16 season with a 6–5 record. Marsteller later spoke of how his weight cut down to the 157-pound weight class that year, a weight he hadn't wrestled since his freshman year of high school, feeling disconnected mentally, and wanting to be closer to home, led to his decision to transfer after the season.

=== Lock Haven ===
He transferred to Lock Haven University, a school three hours from his hometown in Pennsylvania, in May 2016. However, Marsteller had been in a steady decline with alcohol and drug addiction, which started to intensify during his college years. On August 25, 2016, Marsteller was charged with aggravated assault, simple assault, recklessly endangering another person, disorderly conduct, and open lewdness after police arrested him for harassing the residents of an apartment complex in Lock Haven. He was subsequently kicked off the wrestling team and out of school and sentenced to a seven-year probation. Using that incident as a motivational tool to redeem himself and turn things around, Marsteller had a successful stint at rehab, re-enrolled at Lock Haven in the 2017 spring semester, finished that semester with a 4.0 GPA, and was embraced with support being back home.

By the time the 2017–18 season had started, Marsteller was back on the Lock Haven wrestling team once again. He finished the year with a 44–4 record, a single season school win record for Lock Haven, and placed fourth at the NCAA national championships becoming an All-American. His redshirt senior year in 2018–19, Marsteller went 28–3, and was honored as the Eastern Wrestling League Athlete of the Year, Pennsylvania State Athletic Conference Division I Wrestler of the Year, and finished third at the NCAA national championships, becoming a two-time All-American.

While turning things around and finding success on and off the mat, Marsteller later came out with how he had relapsed and continued to struggle with drug addiction throughout college. This would hinder him from reaching his potential, as he knew he wasn't competing near his ceiling of capability. Opioids, fentanyl, and heroin were different drugs he would use, and though he continued to manage training, practicing, and going about day-to-day life, his drug addiction was worsening and growing stronger.

== Freestyle career ==
Marsteller would continue his wrestling career on the senior level circuit, following his collegiate career in 2019.

In 2020, after driving under the influence and wrecking his car and his wife's car in one night, Marsteller entered rehab again. After almost losing everything, he sobered up for good in July 2020, while also rebuilding relationships with his family.

Around the start of 2022, Marsteller began visiting the New York City Regional Training Center in Hoboken, New Jersey, and ultimately moving there for more individual coaching and a strong group of wrestling partners. He would go on to make the 2022 Final X, the final wrestle-off for a spot on the United States World Team at the 2022 World Championships, where he lost a two-out-of-three series to American wrestling legend Jordan Burroughs at 79 kg.

The following year, he bested Jordan Burroughs at the 2023 Final X, making his first senior level United States World Team. He finished 14th at the 2023 World Championships, representing the United States at 79 kg.

Marsteller won the 2026 US Open at 79 kg, qualifying him for Final X in June.

== Freestyle record ==
Senior Freestyle Matches
Res.	Record	Opponent	Score	Date	Event	Location
2026 US Open (gold) at 79 kg
Win	104–41	(United States) Evan Wick	7–3	April 24–25, 2026	2026 US Open National Championships	(United States) Las Vegas, Nevada
Win	103–41	(United States) Patrick Kennedy	6–0	April 24–25, 2026	2026 US Open National Championships	(United States) Las Vegas, Nevada
Win	102–41	(United States) James Rowley	TF 12–0	April 24–25, 2026	2026 US Open National Championships	(United States) Las Vegas, Nevada
Win	101–41	(United States) Cash Stewart	TF 10–0	April 24–25, 2026	2026 US Open National Championships	(United States) Las Vegas, Nevada
2025 US World Team Trials DNP at 86 kg
Loss	—N/a	(United States) Marcus Coleman	FF	May 16–17, 2025	2025 US World Team Trials Challenge	(United States) Louisville, Kentucky
Loss	100–41	(United States) Carter Starocci	2–4	May 16–17, 2025	2025 US World Team Trials Challenge	(United States) Louisville, Kentucky
2025 US Open (bronze) at 86 kg
Win	100–40	(United States) Parker Keckeisen	4–2	April 25–26, 2025	2025 US Open National Championships	(United States) Las Vegas, Nevada
Win	99–40	(United States) Rocco Welsh	6–0	April 25–26, 2025	2025 US Open National Championships	(United States) Las Vegas, Nevada
Loss	98–40	(United States) Zahid Valencia	2–4	April 25–26, 2025	2025 US Open National Championships	(United States) Las Vegas, Nevada
Win	98–39	(United States) Marcus Coleman	8–0	April 25–26, 2025	2025 US Open National Championships	(United States) Las Vegas, Nevada
Win	97–39	(United States) James Conway	5–0	April 25–26, 2025	2025 US Open National Championships	(United States) Las Vegas, Nevada
Win	96–39	(United States) Colin Merkley	TF 10–0	April 25–26, 2025	2025 US Open National Championships	(United States) Las Vegas, Nevada
2025 Muhamet Malo Tournament (gold) at 86 kg
Win	95-39	(Kazakhstan) Bolat Sakayev	2-0	February 27, 2025	2025 Muhamet Malo Tournament	Tirana, Albania
Win	94-39	(Poland) Sebastian Jezierzanski	4-0	February 27, 2025	2025 Muhamet Malo Tournament	Tirana, Albania
Win	93-39	(Kazakhstan) Rustem Myrzagaliyev	8–0	February 27, 2025	2025 Muhamet Malo Tournament	Tirana, Albania
2025 Dan Kolov & Nikola Petrov (silver) at 86 kg
Loss	92–39	(United States) Zahid Valencia	TF 0–10	January 23–26, 2025	2025 Dan Kolov & Nikola Petrov Tournament	Sofia, Bulgaria
Win	92–38	(Georgia (country)) Tornike Samkharadze	Fall	January 23–26, 2025	2025 Dan Kolov & Nikola Petrov Tournament	Sofia, Bulgaria
Win	91–38	(Israel) Matt Finesilver	TF 12–2	January 23–26, 2025	2025 Dan Kolov & Nikola Petrov Tournament	Sofia, Bulgaria
Win	90–38	(Bulgaria) Grigor Chernakov	TF 10–0	January 23–26, 2025	2025 Dan Kolov & Nikola Petrov Tournament	Sofia, Bulgaria
2025 Henri Deglane Grand Prix (gold) at 86 kg
Win	89–38	(Switzerland) Lars Schaefle	VIN	January 18, 2025	Grand Prix de France Henri Deglane 2025	Nice, France
Win	88–38	(Lithuania) Paulius Lescauskas	TF 10–0	January 18, 2025	Grand Prix de France Henri Deglane 2025	Nice, France
Win	87–38	(Finland) Miko Elkala	Fall	January 18, 2025	Grand Prix de France Henri Deglane 2025	Nice, France
Win	86–38	(Germany) Ayman Nissr	TF 10–0	January 18, 2025	Grand Prix de France Henri Deglane 2025	Nice, France
2024 US World Team Trials (silver) at 79 kg
Loss	85–38	(United States) Jordan Burroughs	3–6	September 15, 2024	2024 US World Team Trials	(United States) Lincoln, Nebraska
Loss	85–37	(United States) Jordan Burroughs	0–3	September 15, 2024	2024 US World Team Trials	(United States) Lincoln, Nebraska
Win	85–36	(United States) Keegan O'Toole	6–0	September 14, 2024	2024 US World Team Trials	(United States) Lincoln, Nebraska
Win	84–36	(United States) Hunter Garvin	7–0	September 14, 2024	2024 US World Team Trials	(United States) Lincoln, Nebraska
Win	83–36	(United States) Demetrius Romero	TF 10–0	September 14, 2024	2024 US World Team Trials	(United States) Lincoln, Nebraska
2024 Spain Grand Prix (gold) at 86 kg
Win	82–36	(Spain) Gabriel Iglesias Ramos	TF 11–0	July 7, 2024	2024 Spain Grand Prix	Madrid, Spain
Win	—N/a	(Germany) Kiril Kildau	FF	July 7, 2024	2024 Spain Grand Prix	Madrid, Spain
Win	—N/a	(Canada) Alex Moore	FF	July 7, 2024	2024 Spain Grand Prix	Madrid, Spain
Win	81–36	(Canada) Taran Goring	TF 10–0	July 7, 2024	2024 Spain Grand Prix	Madrid, Spain
2024 US Olympic Team Trials DNP at 86 kg
Loss	80–36	(United States) Alex Dieringer	2–3	April 19, 2024	2024 US Olympic Team Trials	(United States) State College, Pennsylvania
Loss	80–35	(United States) Zahid Valencia	0–3	April 19, 2024	2024 US Olympic Team Trials	(United States) State College, Pennsylvania
Win	80–34	(United States) Trent Hidlay	4–2	April 19, 2024	2024 US Olympic Team Trials	(United States) State College, Pennsylvania
Win	79–34	(United States) Evan Wick	6–0	April 19, 2024	2024 US Olympic Team Trials	(United States) State College, Pennsylvania
2024 Pan American Championships (gold) at 86 kg
Win	—N/a	(Venezuela) Pedro Ceballos	FF	February 23, 2024	2024 Pan American Championships	Acapulco, Mexico
Win	—N/a	(Cuba) Yurieski Torreblanca	FF	February 23, 2024	2024 Pan American Championships	Acapulco, Mexico
Win	78–34	(Argentina) Jorge Llano	TF 10–0	February 23, 2024	2024 Pan American Championships	Acapulco, Mexico
2024 Grand Prix Zagreb Open (bronze) at 86 kg
Win	77–34	(Azerbaijan) Arsenii Dzhioev	5–0	January 11, 2024	2024 Grand Prix Zagreb Open	Zagreb, Croatia
Loss	76–34	(Bulgaria) Magomed Ramazanov	TF 0–10	January 11, 2024	2024 Grand Prix Zagreb Open	Zagreb, Croatia
Win	76–33	(Georgia (country)) Vladimeri Gamkrelidze	8–5	January 11, 2024	2024 Grand Prix Zagreb Open	Zagreb, Croatia
Win	75–33	(Azerbaijan) Osman Nurmagomedov	3–1	January 11, 2024	2024 Grand Prix Zagreb Open	Zagreb, Croatia
Win	74–33	(Venezuela) Pedro Ceballos	4–0	January 11, 2024	2024 Grand Prix Zagreb Open	Zagreb, Croatia
2023 World Championships 14th at 79 kg
Loss	73–33	(Azerbaijan) Orkhan Abbasov	3–9	September 18, 2023	2023 World Championships	Belgrade, Serbia
Win	73–32	(Algeria) Chemseddine Fetairia	7–2	September 18, 2023	2023 World Championships	Belgrade, Serbia
2023 Polyák Imre & Varga János Memorial Tournament (bronze) at 79 kg
Win	72–32	(Georgia (country)) Avtandil Kentchadze	4–3	July 14, 2023	2023 Polyák Imre & Varga János Memorial Tournament	Budapest, Hungary
Win	71–32	(Austria) Simon Marchl	TF 11–0	July 14, 2023	2023 Polyák Imre & Varga János Memorial Tournament	Budapest, Hungary
Loss	70–32	(Iran) Mohammad Nokhodi	TF 0–10	July 14, 2023	2023 Polyák Imre & Varga János Memorial Tournament	Budapest, Hungary
Win	70–31	(Turkey) Ramazan Sarı	4–1	July 14, 2023	2023 Polyák Imre & Varga János Memorial Tournament	Budapest, Hungary
2023 US World Team Trials (gold) at 79 kg
Win	69–31	(United States) Jordan Burroughs	8–3	June 10, 2023	2023 Final X NYC	(United States) New York City, New York
Win	68–31	(United States) Jordan Burroughs	5–4	June 10, 2023	2023 Final X NYC	(United States) New York City, New York
Loss	67–31	(United States) Jordan Burroughs	3–3	June 10, 2023	2023 Final X NYC	(United States) New York City, New York
2023 US Open (gold) at 79 kg
Win	67–30	(United States) Alex Dieringer	3–2	April 27, 2023	2023 US Open National Championships	(United States) Las Vegas, Nevada
Win	66–30	(United States) David McFadden	6–1	April 27, 2023	2023 US Open National Championships	(United States) Las Vegas, Nevada
Win	65–30	(United States) Devin Skatzka	TF 14–3	April 27, 2023	2023 US Open National Championships	(United States) Las Vegas, Nevada
Win	64–30	(United States) Aaden Valdez	TF 12–2	April 27, 2023	2023 US Open National Championships	(United States) Las Vegas, Nevada
Win	63–30	(United States) Josiah Green	Fall	April 27, 2023	2023 US Open National Championships	(United States) Las Vegas, Nevada
2023 Ibrahim Moustafa Tournament (bronze) at 79 kg
Win	62–30	(Kazakhstan) Bolat Sakayev	2–1	February 26, 2023	2023 Ibrahim Moustafa Tournament	Alexandria, Egypt
Win	61–30	(Algeria) Chemseddine Fetairia	TF 11–0	February 26, 2023	2023 Ibrahim Moustafa Tournament	Alexandria, Egypt
Loss	60–30	(Iran) Amir Hossein Kavousi	2–5	February 26, 2023	2023 Ibrahim Moustafa Tournament	Alexandria, Egypt
Win	60–29	(Kazakhstan) Bibarys Nuryllauly	TF 10–0	February 26, 2023	2023 Ibrahim Moustafa Tournament	Alexandria, Egypt
2023 Grand Prix Zagreb Open (bronze) at 79 kg
Win	—N/a	(Hungary) Csaba Vida	FF	February 2, 2023	2023 Grand Prix Zagreb Open	Zagreb, Croatia
Loss	58–29	(Georgia (country)) Avtandil Kentchadze	1–4	February 2, 2023	2023 Grand Prix Zagreb Open	Zagreb, Croatia
Win	58–28	(Turkey) Ramazan Sarı	6–4	February 2, 2023	2023 Grand Prix Zagreb Open	Zagreb, Croatia
2022 Tunis Ranking Series (bronze) at 79 kg
Win	57–28	(India) Gourav Baliyan	TF 10–0	July 17, 2022	2022 Tunis Ranking Series	Tunis, Tunisia
Loss	56–28	(Kazakhstan) Bolat Sakayev	1–6	July 17, 2022	2022 Tunis Ranking Series	Tunis, Tunisia
Win	56–27	(Greece) Georgios Kougioumtsidis	TF 11–0	July 17, 2022	2022 Tunis Ranking Series	Tunis, Tunisia
Win	55–27	(Iran) Ali Savadkouhi	9–6	July 17, 2022	2022 Tunis Ranking Series	Tunis, Tunisia
Loss	54–27	(Iran) Mohammad Nokhodi	TF 0–10	July 17, 2022	2022 Tunis Ranking Series	Tunis, Tunisia
2022 US World Team Trials (silver) at 79 kg
Loss	54–26	(United States) Jordan Burroughs	0–5	June 8, 2022	2022 Final X NYC	(United States) New York City, New York
Win	54–25	(United States) Jordan Burroughs	2–2	June 8, 2022	2022 Final X NYC	(United States) New York City, New York
Loss	53–25	(United States) Jordan Burroughs	0–4	June 8, 2022	2022 Final X NYC	(United States) New York City, New York
Win	53–24	(United States) Vincenzo Joseph	7–2	May 21–22, 2022	2022 US World Team Trials Challenge	(United States) Lincoln, Nebraska
Loss	52–24	(United States) Vincenzo Joseph	2–6	May 21–22, 2022	2022 US World Team Trials Challenge	(United States) Lincoln, Nebraska
Win	52–23	(United States) Vincenzo Joseph	4–0	May 21–22, 2022	2022 US World Team Trials Challenge	(United States) Lincoln, Nebraska
Win	51–23	(United States) David McFadden	5–2	May 21–22, 2022	2022 US World Team Trials Challenge	(United States) Lincoln, Nebraska
Win	50–23	(United States) Carter Starocci	5–4	May 21–22, 2022	2022 US World Team Trials Challenge	(United States) Lincoln, Nebraska
2022 US Open 5th at 79 kg
Win	49–23	(United States) Brayden Thompson	3–0	April 27 – May 1, 2022	2022 US Open National Championships	(United States) Las Vegas, Nevada
Loss	48–23	(United States) Alex Dieringer	0–4	April 27 – May 1, 2022	2022 US Open National Championships	(United States) Las Vegas, Nevada
Loss	48–22	(United States) David McFadden	10–11	April 27 – May 1, 2022	2022 US Open National Championships	(United States) Las Vegas, Nevada
Win	48–21	(United States) Brayden Thompson	TF 11–0	April 27 – May 1, 2022	2022 US Open National Championships	(United States) Las Vegas, Nevada
Win	47–21	(United States) Isaiah White	TF 11–0	April 27 – May 1, 2022	2022 US Open National Championships	(United States) Las Vegas, Nevada
Win	46–21	(United States) Keegan Mulhill	TF 10–0	April 27 – May 1, 2022	2022 US Open National Championships	(United States) Las Vegas, Nevada
2022 Yasar Dogu (silver) at 79 kg
Loss	45–21	(United States) Jordan Burroughs	0–8	February 27, 2022	2022 Yasar Dogu Tournament	Istanbul, Turkey
Win	45–20	(Kyrgyzstan) Arsalan Budazhapov	6–3	February 27, 2022	2022 Yasar Dogu Tournament	Istanbul, Turkey
Win	44–20	(Turkey) Nuri Temur	5–2	February 27, 2022	2022 Yasar Dogu Tournament	Istanbul, Turkey
Win	43–20	(Serbia) Khetag Tsabolov	10–5	February 27, 2022	2022 Yasar Dogu Tournament	Istanbul, Turkey
Win	42–20	(United States) David McFadden	10–7	February 27, 2022	2022 Yasar Dogu Tournament	Istanbul, Turkey
2021 US World Team Trials DNP at 79 kg
Loss	41–20	(United States) Carter Starocci	0–7	September 11–12, 2021	2021 US World Team Trials	(United States) Lincoln, Nebraska
Loss	41–19	(United States) Jordan Burroughs	1–4	September 11–12, 2021	2021 US World Team Trials	(United States) Lincoln, Nebraska
Win	41–18	(United States) Thomas Gantt	TF 10–0	September 11–12, 2021	2021 US World Team Trials	(United States) Lincoln, Nebraska
2020 US Olympic Team Trials DNP at 74 kg
Loss	40–18	(United States) Logan Massa	4–9	April 2, 2021	2020 US Olympic Team Trials	(United States) Fort Worth, Texas
Loss	40–17	(United States) Evan Wick	Fall	April 2, 2021	2020 US Olympic Team Trials	(United States) Fort Worth, Texas
Win	40–16	(United States) Vincenzo Joseph	3–3	April 2, 2021	2020 US Olympic Team Trials	(United States) Fort Worth, Texas
2021 US Last Chance OTT (gold) at 74 kg
Win	39–16	(United States) Vincenzo Joseph	5–0	March 26–27, 2021	2021 US Last Chance Olympic Team Trials Qualifier	(United States) Fort Worth, Texas
Win	38–16	(United States) Alec Pantaleo	7–0	March 26–27, 2021	2021 US Last Chance Olympic Team Trials Qualifier	(United States) Fort Worth, Texas
Win	37–16	(United States) Joey Lavallee	7–0	March 26–27, 2021	2021 US Last Chance Olympic Team Trials Qualifier	(United States) Fort Worth, Texas
Win	36–16	(United States) Christian Monserrat	TF 10–0	March 26–27, 2021	2021 US Last Chance Olympic Team Trials Qualifier	(United States) Fort Worth, Texas
Win	35–16	(United States) Cael McCormick	9–0	March 26–27, 2021	2021 US Last Chance Olympic Team Trials Qualifier	(United States) Fort Worth, Texas
2019 US Nationals DNP at 74 kg
Loss	34–16	(United States) Mekhi Lewis	VIN (0–8)	December 20–22, 2019	2019 US National Championships	(United States) Fort Worth, Texas
Win	34–15	(United States) Tyler Berger	6–4	December 20–22, 2019	2019 US National Championships	(United States) Fort Worth, Texas
Win	33–15	(United States) Jake Sueflohn	10–9	December 20–22, 2019	2019 US National Championships	(United States) Fort Worth, Texas
2019 Bill Farrell Memorial International DNP at 74 kg
Loss	32–15	(United States) Logan Massa	3–5	November 15, 2019	2019 Bill Farrell Memorial International	(United States) New York City, New York
Win	32–14	(United States) Evan Barczak	TF 12–1	November 15, 2019	2019 Bill Farrell Memorial International	(United States) New York City, New York
2019 Medved Grand Prix 9th at 79 kg
Loss	31–14	(Uzbekistan) Isa Shapiev	0–5	August 9, 2019	2019 Medved Grand Prix	Minsk, Belarus
Loss	31–13	(Russia) Magomed Ramazanov	6–9	August 9, 2019	2019 Medved Grand Prix	Minsk, Belarus
2019 US Open (silver) at 79 kg
Loss	31–12	(United States) Alex Dieringer	TF 0–11	April 24–27, 2019	2019 US Open National Championships	(United States) Las Vegas, Nevada
Win	31–11	(United States) Stacey Davis	TF 10–0	April 24–27, 2019	2019 US Open National Championships	(United States) Las Vegas, Nevada
Win	30–11	(United States) Nick Becker	5–2	April 24–27, 2019	2019 US Open National Championships	(United States) Las Vegas, Nevada
Win	29–11	(United States) CJ Brucki	6–2	April 24–27, 2019	2019 US Open National Championships	(United States) Las Vegas, Nevada
Win	28–11	(United States) Shabaka Johns	TF 10–0	April 24–27, 2019	2019 US Open National Championships	(United States) Las Vegas, Nevada
2017 US U23 World Team Trials (silver) at 74 kg
Loss	27–11	(United States) Isaiah Martinez	6–7	November 7–8, 2017	2017 US U23 World Team Trials	(United States) Rochester, Minnesota
Loss	27–10	(United States) Isaiah Martinez	2–8	November 7–8, 2017	2017 US U23 World Team Trials	(United States) Rochester, Minnesota
2017 US World Team Trials 4th at 74 kg
Loss	27–9	(United States) Isaiah Martinez	6–9	June 8–9, 2017	2017 US World Team Trials	(United States) Lincoln, Nebraska
Win	27–8	(United States) Kevin LeValley	3–0	June 8–9, 2017	2017 US World Team Trials	(United States) Lincoln, Nebraska
Loss	26–8	(United States) Alex Dieringer	TF 0–10	June 8–9, 2017	2017 US World Team Trials	(United States) Lincoln, Nebraska
Win	26–7	(United States) Anthony Valencia	6–1	June 8–9, 2017	2017 US World Team Trials	(United States) Lincoln, Nebraska
2017 US University Nationals (gold) at 74 kg
Win	25–7	(United States) Connor Flynn	TF 10–0	June 1–2, 2017	2017 US University National Championships	(United States) Akron, Ohio
Win	24–7	(United States) Josh Shields	TF 10–0	June 1–2, 2017	2017 US University National Championships	(United States) Akron, Ohio
Win	23–7	(United States) Cole Walter	TF 15–4	June 1–2, 2017	2017 US University National Championships	(United States) Akron, Ohio
Win	22–7	(United States) Andrew Fogarty	TF 10–0	June 1–2, 2017	2017 US University National Championships	(United States) Akron, Ohio
Win	21–7	(United States) Ryan Niven	TF 10–0	June 1–2, 2017	2017 US University National Championships	(United States) Akron, Ohio
Win	20–7	(United States) Cole Wysocki	TF 14–4	June 1–2, 2017	2017 US University National Championships	(United States) Akron, Ohio
2017 US Open 7th at 74 kg
Win	19–7	(United States) Dan Vallimont	8–1	April 24–28, 2017	2017 US Open National Championships	(United States) Las Vegas, Nevada
Loss	18–7	(United States) Anthony Valencia	Fall	April 24–28, 2017	2017 US Open National Championships	(United States) Las Vegas, Nevada
Win	18–6	(United States) Vladyslav Dombrovskiy	8–3	April 24–28, 2017	2017 US Open National Championships	(United States) Las Vegas, Nevada
Win	17–6	(United States) Jacob Thalin	TF 13–2	April 24–28, 2017	2017 US Open National Championships	(United States) Las Vegas, Nevada
Win	16–6	(United States) Jacen Petersen	TF 10–0	April 24–28, 2017	2017 US Open National Championships	(United States) Las Vegas, Nevada
Win	15–6	(United States) Tyler McLean	TF 10–0	April 24–28, 2017	2017 US Open National Championships	(United States) Las Vegas, Nevada
Loss	14–6	(United States) Alex Dieringer	3–5	April 24–28, 2017	2017 US Open National Championships	(United States) Las Vegas, Nevada
2016 Bill Farrell Memorial International DNP at 74 kg
Loss	14–5	(Russia) Khalil Aminov	0–6	November 9–12, 2016	2016 Bill Farrell Memorial International	(United States) New York City, New York
Loss	14–4	(United States) Alex Dieringer	TF 0–10	November 9–12, 2016	2016 Bill Farrell Memorial International	(United States) New York City, New York
Win	14–3	(Canada) Jevon Balfour	5–0	November 9–12, 2016	2016 Bill Farrell Memorial International	(United States) New York City, New York
Win	13–3	(United States) Vladyslav Dombrovskiy	TF 11–0	November 9–12, 2016	2016 Bill Farrell Memorial International	(United States) New York City, New York
Win	12–3	(United States) Tony Piva	TF 11–0	November 9–12, 2016	2016 Bill Farrell Memorial International	(United States) New York City, New York
2016 US University Nationals (silver) at 74 kg
Loss	11–3	(United States) Isaiah Martinez	TF 5–15	June 2–6, 2016	2016 US University National Championships	(United States) Akron, Ohio
Loss	11–2	(United States) Isaiah Martinez	10–14	June 2–6, 2016	2016 US University National Championships	(United States) Akron, Ohio
Win	11–1	(United States) Thomas Gantt	8–6	June 2–6, 2016	2016 US University National Championships	(United States) Akron, Ohio
Win	10–1	(United States) Chad Welch	TF 12–2	June 2–6, 2016	2016 US University National Championships	(United States) Akron, Ohio
Win	9–1	(United States) Chad Pyke	Fall	June 2–6, 2016	2016 US University National Championships	(United States) Akron, Ohio
Win	8–1	(United States) Logan Breitenbach	TF 10–0	June 2–6, 2016	2016 US University National Championships	(United States) Akron, Ohio
Win	7–1	(United States) Kaylon Sencio	Fall	June 2–6, 2016	2016 US University National Championships	(United States) Akron, Ohio
Win	6–1	(United States) Elliott Raiford	TF 10–0	June 2–6, 2016	2016 US University National Championships	(United States) Akron, Ohio
2016 US University National Duals at 74 kg – 9th for Mat-Town WC
Win	5–1	(United States) Blake Sutherland	TF 10–0	May 21–22, 2016	2016 US University National Duals	(United States) Fairfax, Virginia
Win	4–1	(United States) Brendon Colbert	TF 10–0	May 21–22, 2016	2016 US University National Duals	(United States) Fairfax, Virginia
Win	4–1	(United States) Jake Kaminsky	TF 10–0	May 21–22, 2016	2016 US University National Duals	(United States) Fairfax, Virginia
Loss	4–2	(United States) Markus Scheidel	10–11	May 21–22, 2016	2016 US University National Duals	(United States) Fairfax, Virginia
Win	4–1	(United States) Shabaka Johns	TF 12–2	May 21–22, 2016	2016 US University National Duals	(United States) Fairfax, Virginia
2016 US Last Chance OTT (bronze) at 74 kg
Win	3–1	(United States) Santiago Martinez	TF 13–2	April 1–4, 2016	2016 US Last Chance Olympic Team Trials Qualifier	(United States) Cedar Falls, Iowa
Win	2–1	(United States) Nestor Taffur	11–10	April 1–4, 2016	2016 US Last Chance Olympic Team Trials Qualifier	(United States) Cedar Falls, Iowa
Loss	1–1	(United States) Anthony Valencia	4–9	April 1–4, 2016	2016 US Last Chance Olympic Team Trials Qualifier	(United States) Cedar Falls, Iowa
Win	1–0	(United States) Michael Coleman	TF 10–0	April 1–4, 2016	2016 US Last Chance Olympic Team Trials Qualifier	(United States) Cedar Falls, Iowa

== Personal life ==
Marsteller is married to his wife Jenna, with who he has two sons, Cannon and Easton.

On November 15, 2024, a documentary was released on Marsteller's comeback story of going from a high school phenom, to falling into drug addiction, to finding redemption and redefining his legacy.
