= Mukul Dahiya =

Indian freestyle wrestler

Personal information
- Born: July 14, 2005 (age 21) Fatehpur, Sonipat, Haryana

Sport
- Country: India
- Sport: Freestyle Wrestling
- Weight class: 86 kg
Medal record
Representing India
Men's freestyle wrestling
Asian Wrestling Championships
Silver medal – second place	2026 Bishkek	86 kg
Asian U20 Wrestling Championships
Gold medal – first place	2023 Amman	86 kg

Mukul Dahiya (born 1 January 2005) is an Indian freestyle wrestler from Haryana. He competes in the 86 kg weight category. In the 2026, Pro Wrestling League he was picked up by the Tigers of Mumbai Dangals.

== Early life ==
Dahiya was born on 14 July 2005 and is from Fatehpur village in Sonipat district, Haryana.

== Career ==
In April 2026, Dahiya won the silver medal in the 86 kg category at the 2026 Asian Wrestling Championships in Bishkek, Kyrgyzstan. He defeating Bobur Islomov, Khidir Kurban Saipudinov and Bolat Sakayev before losing to Kamran Ghasempour in the final.

At the 2025 World Wrestling Championships in Zagreb, he finished fifth in the 86 kg category after losing to Zahid Valencia in the opening round, winning two repechage bouts, and losing the bronze-medal bout to Kamran Ghasempour.

In March 2025, Dahiya won the national selection trials in the 86 kg category for the 2025 Asian Wrestling Championships. At the 2025 Asian Wrestling Championships, he reached the semifinal of the 86 kg category after defeating Gary Chow and world No.2, Mukhammad Abdullaev. He lost to Abolfazl Rahmani Firouzjaei in the semifinal and Tatsuya Shirai in the bronze-medal bout.

Dahiya won the 86 kg freestyle title at the 2023 Asian U20 Championships in Amman. At the 2023 World U20 Wrestling Championships, he defeated Davids Aleksanders Pirozniks in the qualification round but lost to Amirhossein Rahmat Alizadehshahkolaei in the round of 16.

== Provisional suspension ==
Dahiya won the 86 kg category national selection trials for the 2026 Asian Games in Lucknow on 31 May 2026. But in August 2026, he was provisionally suspended by the National Anti-Doping Agency after testing positive for mephentermine. His sample was collected during the Asian Games selection trials. Following his suspension by NADA, he was withdrawn from India's Asian Games squad by the Wrestling Federation of India while he was undergoing training at Yerevan, Armenia, leaving the men's 86 kg freestyle category unrepresented.
