= Hayato Ishiguro =

Japanese freestyle wrestler

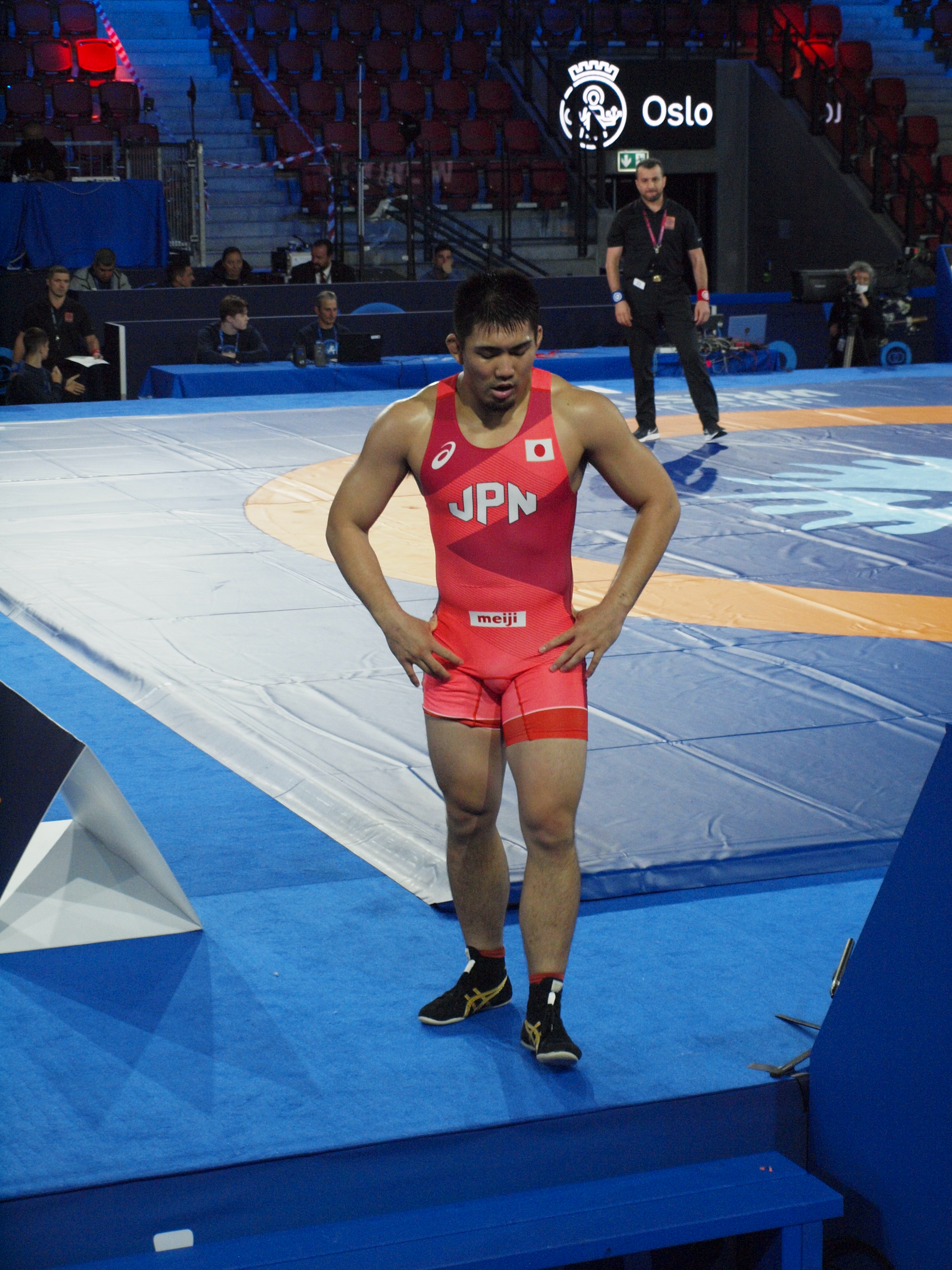

Personal information
- Native name: 石黒隼士
- Born: 23 August 1999 (age 27) Tokyo, Japan

Sport
- Country: Japan
- Sport: Wrestling
- Weight class: 86 kg
- Event: Freestyle
- Club: Nihon University
Medal record
Men's freestyle wrestling
Representing Japan
World Championships
Silver medal – second place	2025 Zagreb	86 kg
Asian Games
Silver medal – second place	2026 Aichi–Nagoya	86 kg
U23 World Championships
Bronze medal – third place	2019 Budapest	86 kg
Grand Prix
Bronze medal – third place	2024 Budapest	86 kg
Silver medal – second place	2023 Zagreb	86 kg
U20 World Championships
Gold medal – first place	2018 Trnava	79 kg
Japan National Championships
Gold medal – first place	2023 Tokyo	86 kg
Gold medal – first place	2023 Tokyo	86 kg
Gold medal – first place	2022 Tokyo	86 kg
Gold medal – first place	2021 Tokyo	97 kg
Gold medal – first place	2020 Tokyo	86 kg
Gold medal – first place	2020 Tokyo	86 kg
Silver medal – second place	2019 Tokyo	86 kg
Bronze medal – third place	2019 Tokyo	86 kg
Bronze medal – third place	2018 Tokyo	86 kg
Bronze medal – third place	2018 Tokyo	79 kg
Bronze medal – third place	2017 Tokyo	79 kg

Hayato Ishiguro (石黒隼士, Ishiguro Hayato; born 23 August 1999) is a Japanese freestyle wrestler who competes in the 86 kilogram class. A U20 World champion, he represented Japan at the 2024 Summer Olympics, having qualified by reaching the finals of the 2024 Asian Olympic Qualification Tournament.
