= 2021 European Wrestling Championships – Men's freestyle 86 kg =

Wrestling competition

The men's freestyle 86 kg is a competition featured at the 2021 European Wrestling Championships, and was held in Warsaw, Poland on April 20 and April 21.

== Medalists ==
Gold	Artur Naifonov; Russia
Silver	Sandro Aminashvili; Georgia
Bronze	Ali Shabanau; Belarus
Bronze	Myles Amine; San Marino

== Results ==
Legend

- F — Won by fall
- R — Retired
- WO — Won by walkover

=== Final ===
Final
Sandro Aminashvili (GEO)	0
Artur Naifonov (RUS)	8

=== Top half ===
Round of 32

Round of 16
Edgaras Voitechovskis (LTU)	0
Gheorghi Pascalov (MDA)	10
Ali Shabanau (BLR)	6
Dzhemal Ali (BUL)	0^{R}
Benjamin Greil (AUT)	0
Sebastian Jezierzański (POL)	11
Sandro Aminashvili (GEO)	11
Simone Iannattoni (ITA)	0

Quarterfinals
Gheorghi Pascalov (MDA)	1
Ali Shabanau (BLR)	11
Sebastian Jezierzański (POL)	1
Sandro Aminashvili (GEO)	5

Semifinals
Ali Shabanau (BLR)	2
Sandro Aminashvili (GEO)	3^{F}

=== Bottom half ===
Round of 32
Joshua Morodion (GER)	1
Mraz Dzhafarian (UKR)	3
Osman Göçen (TUR)	5
Stefan Reichmuth (SUI)	4

Round of 16
Myles Amine (SMR)	4
Akhmed Aibuev (FRA)	0
Artur Naifonov (RUS)	10
Gadzhimurad Magomedsaidov (AZE)	2
Boris Makoev (SVK)	8
Uri Kalashnikov (ISR)	1
Mraz Dzhafarian (UKR)	12
Osman Göçen (TUR)	3

Quarterfinals
Myles Amine (SMR)	0
Artur Naifonov (RUS)	2
Boris Makoev (SVK)	5
Mraz Dzhafarian (UKR)	4

Semifinals
Artur Naifonov (RUS)	9
Boris Makoev (SVK)	0

=== Repechage ===
Repechage round 2
Simone Iannattoni (ITA)	0
Sebastian Jezierzański (POL)	10
Gadzhimurad Magomedsaidov (AZE)
Myles Amine (SMR)	WO

Bronze medal match
Sebastian Jezierzański (POL)	2
Ali Shabanau (BLR)	4
Myles Amine (SMR)	6
Boris Makoev (SVK)	4

== Final standing ==
Rank	Athlete
1st place, gold medalist(s)	Artur Naifonov (RUS)
2nd place, silver medalist(s)	Sandro Aminashvili (GEO)
3rd place, bronze medalist(s)	Ali Shabanau (BLR)
3rd place, bronze medalist(s)	Myles Amine (SMR)
5	Sebastian Jezierzański (POL)
5	Boris Makoev (SVK)
7	Mraz Dzhafarian (UKR)
8	Gheorghi Pascalov (MDA)
9	Osman Göçen (TUR)
10	Stefan Reichmuth (SUI)
11	Gadzhimurad Magomedsaidov (AZE)
12	Joshua Morodion (GER)
13	Uri Kalashnikov (ISR)
14	Akhmed Aibuev (FRA)
15	Dzhemal Ali (BUL)
16	Edgaras Voitechovskis (LTU)
17	Benjamin Greil (AUT)
18	Simone Iannattoni (ITA)
