= 2024 United States Olympic trials (wrestling) =

2024 U.S. Olympic Wrestling Team Trials
- Host city: State College, Pennsylvania, United States
- Dates: April 19–20, 2024
- Stadium: Bryce Jordan Center

The 2024 United States Olympic Team Trials for wrestling were held at the Bryce Jordan Center of State College, Pennsylvania, on April 19–20, 2024. This event determined the representative of the United States of America for the 2024 Summer Olympics at each Olympic weight class.

== Medal summary ==
=== Men's freestyle ===
Event	Gold	Silver	Bronze
57 kg	Spencer Lee (HWC)	Thomas Gilman (NLWC)	Marcus Blaze (PWC)
65 kg	Zain Retherford (NLWC)	Nick Lee (NLWC)	Joseph McKenna (PRTC)
74 kg	Kyle Dake (NLWC)	Jason Nolf (NLWC)	Mitchell Mesenbrink (NLWC)
86 kg	Aaron Brooks (NLWC)	David Taylor (NLWC)	Trent Hidlay (WRTC)
97 kg	Kyle Snyder (NLWC)	Isaac Trumble (WRTC)	Kollin Moore (OHRTC)
125 kg	Mason Parris (CKWC)	Hayden Zillmer (GWC)	Nick Gwiazdowski (SPAR)

=== Men's Greco–Roman ===
Event	Gold	Silver	Bronze
60 kg	Dalton Roberts (WCAP)	Ildar Hafizov (WCAP)	Max Black (NMU)
67 kg	Ellis Coleman (CLUB)	Alejandro Sancho (CLUB)	Pat Smith (MNS)
77 kg	Kamal Bey (WCAP)	Aliaksandr Kikiniou (NYAC)	Jesse Porter (NYAC)
87 kg	Payton Jacobson (NMU)	Spencer Woods (WCAP)	John Stefanowicz (USMC)
97 kg	Joe Rau (TMWC)	Alan Vera (NYAC)	Nicholas Boykin (SKWC)
130 kg	Adam Coon (CKWC)	Cohlton Schultz (SKWC)	Aden Attao (BDRTC)

=== Women's freestyle ===
Event	Gold	Silver	Bronze
50 kg	Sarah Hildebrandt (NYAC)	Audrey Jimenez (SKWC)	Sage Mortimer (TMWC)
53 kg	Dominique Parrish (BDRTC)	Haley Augello (IZZY)	Areana Villaescusa (WCAP)
57 kg	Helen Maroulis (SKWC)	Jacarra Winchester (TMWC)	Alex Hedrick (TMWC)
62 kg	Kayla Miracle (SKWC)	Macey Kilty (SKWC)	Adaugo Nwachukwu (WCAP)
68 kg	Amit Elor (NYCRTC)	Forrest Molinari (SKWC)	Alex Glaude (BDRTC)
76 kg	Kennedy Blades (SKWC)	Adeline Gray (NYAC)	Yelena Makoyed (CWC)

== Competition schedule ==
All times are (UTC-4:00)

Date	Time	Event
19 April	10.00–15.30	Session I: Preliminaries, Quarterfinals and Consolation rounds (all styles)
19 April	18.30–22.00	Session II: Semifinals and Challenge Finals (all styles)
20 April	10.00–15.30	Session III: Best of Three round 1, Consolations, Consolation semifinals, 3rd place and True-third place (all styles)
20 April	18.30–22.00	Session IV: Best of Three rounds 2 and 3 (all styles)

== Brackets ==
=== 57 kg ===
==== Championship ====
Round of 16
Luke Lilledahl	3
Daniel DeShazer	2
Marcus Blaze	2
Nick Suriano	4
Liam Cronin	0
Jax Forrest	10

Quarterfinals
Zane Richards	5
Luke Lilledahl	3
Nico Megaludis	0
Spencer Lee	8
Daton Fix	5
Nick Suriano	1
Jax Forrest	4
Thomas Gilman	5

Semifinals
Zane Richards	6
Spencer Lee	13
Daton Fix	0
Thomas Gilman	6

Best of Three finals
Spencer Lee	6	10^{F}
Thomas Gilman	3	2

==== Consolation ====
Round 1
Jax Forrest	5
Daniel DeShazer	4
Liam Cronin	2
Luke Lilledahl	2
Marcus Blaze	2
Nico Megaludis	2

Quarterfinals
Jax Forrest	FF
Nick Suriano
Luke Lilledahl	1
Marcus Blaze	5

Semifinals
Jax Forrest	FF
Zane Richards
Daton Fix
Marcus Blaze	FF

3rd place
Jax Forrest	1
Marcus Blaze	8

=== 65 kg ===
==== Championship ====
Round 1
Jesse Mendez	8
Joseph McKenna	2
Kaleb Larkin	13
Matt Kolodzik	2

Round 2
Alec Pantaleo	5
Seth Gross	3
Beau Bartlett	10
Nahshon Garrett	6
James Green	3
Jesse Mendez	6
Kaleb Larkin	8
Yianni Diakomihalis	13

Round 3
Nick Lee	9
Alec Pantaleo	2
Beau Bartlett	2
Andrew Alirez	6
Jesse Mendez	12
Yianni Diakomihalis	7

Semifinals
Nick Lee	11
Andrew Alirez	9
Jesse Mendez	2
Zain Retherford	3

Best of Three finals
Nick Lee	1	0
Zain Retherford	2	5

==== Consolation ====
Round 1
Kaleb Larkin	0
Seth Gross	10
James Green
Nahshon Garrett	FF

Round 2
Seth Gross	8
Nahshon Garrett	15
Beau Bartlett	2
Joseph McKenna	3
Alec Pantaleo
Matthew Kolodzik	FF

Quarterfinals
Andrew Alirez
Nahshon Garrett	FF
Joseph McKenna	12
Matthew Kolodzik	2

Semifinals
Nahshon Garrett	0
Jesse Mendez	11
Yianni Diakomihalis
Joseph McKenna	FF

3rd place
Jesse Mendez	4
Joseph McKenna	4

=== 74 kg ===
==== Championship ====
Round of 16
Alex Facundo	6
Levi Haines	0
Meyer Shapiro	1
Ladarion Lockett	12
Jarrett Jacques	6
Vincenzo Joseph	6
Alex Marinelli	4
Tyler Berger	0

Quarterfinals
Jordan Burroughs	5
Alex Facundo	3
Ladarion Lockett	3
Mitchell Mesenbrink	13
Quincy Monday	0
Jarrett Jacques	5
Alex Marinelli	2
Jason Nolf	7

Semifinals
Jordan Burroughs	8
Mitchell Mesenbrink	3
Jarrett Jacques	2
Jason Nolf	9

Finals (challenge)
Jordan Burroughs	0
Jason Nolf	3

Best of Three finals
Jason Nolf	1	1
Kyle Dake	4	3

==== Consolation ====
Round 1
Meyer Shapiro	0
Quincy Monday	10
Levi Haines	7
Alex Marinelli	11
Ladarion Lockett	FF
Vincenzo Joseph
Alex Facundo	5
Tyler Berger	5

Round 2
Quincy Monday	11
Alex Marinelli	0
Ladarion Lockett	4
Tyler Berger	6

Semifinals
Quincy Monday	1
Mitchell Mesenbrink	12
Jarrett Jacques	4
Tyler Berger	3

3rd place
Mitchell Mesenbrink	10
Jarrett Jacques	0

=== 86 kg ===
==== Championship ====
Round 1
Pat Downey	4
Carter Starocci	12
Max Dean	1
Evan Wick	13

Round 2
Connor Mirasola	4
David McFadden	0
Trent Hidlay	6
Carter Starocci	4
Evan Wick	0
Chance Marsteller	6

Round 3
Aaron Brooks	11
Connor Mirasola	5
Mark Hall	2
Alex Dieringer	5
Trent Hidlay	2
Chance Marsteller	4

Semifinals
Aaron Brooks	8
Alex Dieringer	4
Chance Marsteller	0
Zahid Valencia	3

Finals (challenge)
Aaron Brooks	7
Zahid Valencia	6

Best of Three finals
Aaron Brooks	4	3
David Taylor	1	1

==== Consolation ====
Round 1
Evan Wick	8
David McFadden	2

Round 2
Evan Wick	FF
Carter Starocci
Mark Hall	FF
Pat Downey
Connor Mirasola	2
Max Dean	12

Round 3
Alex Dieringer	2^{F}
Evan Wick	1
Mark Hall	12
Max Dean	2

Semifinals
Alex Dieringer	3
Chance Marsteller	2
Trent Hidlay	9
Mark Hall	4

3rd place
Alex Dieringer	4
Trent Hidlay	5

True-third place
Trent Hidlay	FF
Zahid Valencia

=== 97 kg ===
==== Championship ====
Round of 16
Christian Carroll	6
Anthony Cassioppi	6

Quarterfinals
J'den Cox	1
Christian Carroll	1
Nate Jackson	6
Kollin Moore	16
Michael Macchiavello	4
Jonathan Aiello	8
Eric Schultz	3
Isaac Trumble	7

Semifinals
J'den Cox	2
Kollin Moore	2
Jonathan Aiello	4
Isaac Trumble	6

Finals (challenge)
Kollin Moore	1
Isaac Trumble	11

Best of Three finals
Isaac Trumble	0	0
Kyle Snyder	5	4

==== Consolation ====
Round 1
Eric Schultz	12^{F}
Anthony Cassioppi	5

Quarterfinals
Eric Schultz	3
Michael Macchiavello	2
Christian Carroll	0
Nate Jackson	11

Semifinals
Eric Schultz	FF
J'den Cox
Jonathan Aiello	0
Nate Jackson	11

3rd place
Eric Schultz	2
Nate Jackson	4

True-third place
Nate Jackson
Kollin Moore	FF

=== 125 kg ===
==== Championship ====
Round of 16
Trent Hillger	7
Demetrius Thomas	11
Gary Traub	2
Jaron Smith	6

Quarterfinals
Hayden Zillmer	4
Demetrius Thomas	2
Wyatt Hendrickson	8
Dom Bradley	12
Greg Kerkvliet	10
Christian Lance	0
Jaron Smith	1
Nick Gwiazdowski	12

Semifinals
Hayden Zillmer	5
Dom Bradley	0
Greg Kerkvliet	1
Nick Gwiazdowski	5

Finals (challenge)
Hayden Zillmer	5
Nick Gwiazdowski	1

Best of Three finals
Hayden Zillmer	0	0
Mason Parris	7	7

==== Consolation ====
Round 1
Trent Hillger	12
Jaron Smith	2
Demetrius Thomas	3
Gary Traub	8

Round 2
Christian Lance
Trent Hillger	FF
Gary Traub	5
Wyatt Hendrickson	16

Semifinals
Trent Hillger	0
Dom Bradley	4
Greg Kerkvliet	11
Wyatt Hendrickson	0

3rd place
Dom Bradley	2
Greg Kerkvliet	2

True-third place
Dom Bradley	4
Nick Gwiazdowski	7

== Qualification procedures ==
To qualify for the 2024 US Olympic Team Trials directly, a wrestler must have achieved a certain result at at least one of the determined qualifying tournaments set by USA Wrestling. The procedures were the following:

=== Men's freestyle ===
Qualifying Event		Men									
Qualifying Event		Freestyle									
Qualifying Event		57 kg	65 kg	74 kg	86 kg	97 kg	125 kg	61 kg (N.O.)	70 kg (N.O.)	79 kg (N.O.)	92 kg (N.O.)
2018 US World Team Trials		–	Logan Stieber	–	–	–	–	Joe Colon; Nahshon Garrett	–	–	–
2019 US World Team Trials		Daton Fix	–	Jordan Burroughs	Pat Downey	–	–	Tyler Graff	–	–	–
2020 US Olympic Team Trials		Thomas Gilman	–	–	–	–	Gable Steveson				
2021 US World Team Trials			–				Nick Gwiazdowski	–	James Green	–	–
2022 US World Team Trials		–	Yianni Diakomihalis	–	–	–	Hayden Zillmer	Seth Gross	–	–	J'den Cox
2023 US World Team Trials		Zane Richards	Nick Lee	–	–	–	–	–	–	Chance Marsteller	–
2023 U17 World Championships		Marcus Blaze							Ladarion Lockett		
2023 U20 World Championships				Mitchell Mesenbrink					Meyer Shapiro		
2023 World Championships (medalists)				Kyle Dake	David Taylor	Kyle Snyder	Mason Parris	Vito Arujau	Zain Retherford		Zahid Valencia
2023 U23 World Championships				Keegan O'Toole	Aaron Brooks	Isaac Trumble	Wyatt Hendrickson				
2023 Bill Farrell Memorial International		Spencer Lee	Kaleb Larkin	Jason Nolf	Trent Hidlay	Michael Macchiavello	Christian Lance				
2023 US National Championships	1st	–	Andrew Alirez	Quincy Monday	Alex Dieringer	Kollin Moore	Dom Bradley				
2023 US National Championships	2nd	Nico Megaludis	Beau Bartlett	Alex Marinelli	Mark Hall	Nathan Jackson	–				
2023 US National Championships	3rd	Liam Cronin	Joseph McKenna	Alex Facundo	Max Dean	Jonathan Aiello	Gary Traub				
2023 US National Championships	4th	Daniel DeShazer	–	Jarrett Jacques	Connor Mirasola	Eric Schultz	Demertius Thomas				
2023 US National Championships	5th	Luke Lilledahl	Austin DeSanto	Tyler Berger	Evan Wick	Anthony Cassioppi	Trent Hillger				
2024 Pan American Championships		–	–	–	–	–	–	Nick Suriano	Alec Pantaleo	–	–
2024 Pan American Olympic Qualifier											
2024 NCAA Division I National Championships		Richard Figueroa	Jesse Mendez; Caleb Henson	David Carr	Parker Keckeisen		Greg Kerkvliet	–	Levi Haines	Carter Starocci	Aaron Brooks
2024 US Last Chance Olympic Trials Qualifier		Jax Forrest	Matthew Kolodzik	Vincenzo Joseph	David McFadden	Christian Carroll	Jaron Smith				

=== Greco–Roman ===
Qualifying Event		Men									
Qualifying Event		Greco–Roman									
Qualifying Event		60 kg	67 kg	77 kg	87 kg	97 kg	130 kg	55 kg (N.O.)	63 kg (N.O.)	72 kg (N.O.)	82 kg (N.O.)
2018 US World Team Trials		–	–	–	Patrick Martinez	–	–	Sam Hazewinkel	Jesse Thielke	RaVaughn Perkins	Geordan Speiller
2019 US World Team Trials		–	Ellis Coleman	Patrick Smith	–	–	Adam Coon	–	Ryan Mango	Ray Bunker	–
2020 US Olympic Team Trials		Ildar Hafizov	Alejandro Sancho	–	John Stefanowicz	–	–				
2021 US World Team Trials		Dalton Roberts	Peyton Omania	Jesse Porter	–	–	—	–	–	–	Ben Provisor
2022 US World Team Trials		–	–	–	Alan Vera	Braxton Amos	–	Max Nowry	Sammy Jones	Benji Peak	–
2023 US World Team Trials		–	–	Kamal Bey	Zachary Braunagel	Joe Rau	–	Brady Koontz	Xavier Johnson	–	Spencer Woods
2023 U17 World Championships											
2021, 2022 or 2023 U20 World Championships (medalists)							Aden Attao				
2023 World Championships (medalists)											
2023 U23 World Championships											
2023 Bill Farrell Memorial International		Randon Miranda	Justus Scott	Peyton Jacobson	Timothy Young	George Sikes IV	Courtney Freeman				
2023 US National Championships	1st	–	–	—	–	–	–				
2023 US National Championships	2nd	Hayden Tuma	–	–	Mahmoud Fawzy	–	–				
2023 US National Championships	3rd	Max Black	Robert Perez III	–	Richard Carlson	Tate Orndorff	–				
2023 US National Championships	4th	Dylan Gregerson	David Stepanian	Danny Braunagel	–	Nicholas Boykin	–				
2023 US National Championships	5th	Taylor LaMont	–	Aliaksandr Kikiniou	Terrence Zaleski	Michael Altomer	Donny Longendyke				
2024 Pan American Championships			–						–		
2024 US Armed Forces Championships		Dalton Duffield	Peter Ogunsanya	Vincent Dolce	Ryan Epps	Diante Cooper	Jermiah Imonode	William Sullivan	Sidney Flores	Jamel Johnson	Marciano Ali
2024 Pan American Olympic Qualifier					Spencer Woods	Alan Vera	Cohlton Schultz				
2024 NCAA Division I National Championships		Richard Figueroa; Vito Arujau	Jesse Mendez	David Carr; Carter Starocci	Parker Keckeisen	Aaron Brooks	Greg Kerkvliet		Caleb Henson	Levi Haines	
2024 US Last Chance Olympic Trials Qualifier		Phillip Moomey	Duncan Nelson	Tyler Eischens	Fritz Schierl	Brandon Marshall	Jacob Mitchell				

=== Women's freestyle ===
Qualifying Event		Women									
Qualifying Event		Freestyle									
Qualifying Event		50 kg	53 kg	57 kg	62 kg	68 kg	76 kg	55 kg (N.O.)	59 kg (N.O.)	65 kg (N.O.)	72 kg (N.O.)
2018 US World Team Trials		–	–	–	Mallory Velte	–	–	–	–	–	Erin Clodgo
2019 US World Team Trials		Whitney Conder	–	Jenna Burkert	Alli Ragan	–	–	–	–	–	Victoria Francis
2020 US Olympic Team Trials		–	–	–	–	Tamyra Mensah-Stock	–				
2021 US World Team Trials		–	Amy Fearnside	–	–	–	—	–	Maya Nelson	Forrest Molinari	Kylie Welker
2022 US World Team Trials		–	–	–	–	–	Dymond Guilford	–	Abigail Nette	–	–
2023 US World Team Trials		–	–	–	–	Emma Bruntil	–	–	–	–	–
2023 U17 World Championships											
2021, 2022 or 2023 U20 World Championships (medalists)		Audrey Jimenez					Kennedy Blades	Amani Jones	Alexis Janiak		
2023 World Championships (medalists)		Sarah Hildebrandt		Helen Maroulis			Adeline Gray	Jacarra Winchester	Jennifer Page	Macey Kilty	
2023 U23 World Championships											
2023 Bill Farrell Memorial International		Erin Golston	Alisha Howk	Xochitl Mota-Pettis	Katerina Lange	–	Yelena Makoyed				
2023 CISM World Military Championships							Tristian Kelly				
2023 US National Championships	1st	Sage Mortimer	Vayle Baker	Amanda Martinez	–	–	Precious Wieser				
2023 US National Championships	2nd	Samara Chavez	Katie Gomez	Alexandra Hedrick	Ashlynn Ortega	Cheyenne Bowman	Marlynne Deede				
2023 US National Championships	3rd	Kendra Ryan	Haley Augello	Shelby Moore	Aine Drury	Alara Boyd	Skylar Grote				
2023 US National Championships	4th	Kaelani Shufeldt	Areana Villaescusa	Cristelle Rodriguez	Maya Letona	Solin Piearcy	Brooklyn Hays				
2023 US National Championships	5th	Mia Palumbo	Sydney Petzinger	Cameron Guerin	SaVannah Cosme	Kaylynn Albrecht	Rose Cassioppi				
2024 Pan American Championships				–	–			–		–	–
2024 Pan American Olympic Qualifier			Dominique Parrish		Kayla Miracle	Amit Elor					
2024 NCWWC Championships		Emilie Gonzalez; Ava Bayless	Felicity Taylor		Claire DiCugno		Sandra Guerrero			Reese Larramendy	
2024 NAIA Championships		Stefana Jelacic	Juliana Diaz		Adaugo Nwachukwu		Ashley Lekas; Tavia Heidelberg-Tillitson		Carolina Moreno	Jamilah McBryde	Caitlyn Davis
2024 US Last Chance Olympic Trials Qualifier		Nyla Valencia	Brianna Gonzalez	Bridgette Duty	Lauren Louive	Chloe Ogden	Madison Sandquist				

== See also ==
- United States at the 2024 Summer Olympics
- Wrestling at the 2024 Summer Olympics
- Wrestling at the 2024 Summer Olympics – Qualification
