= Andrew Alirez =

American mixed martial artist (born 2000)

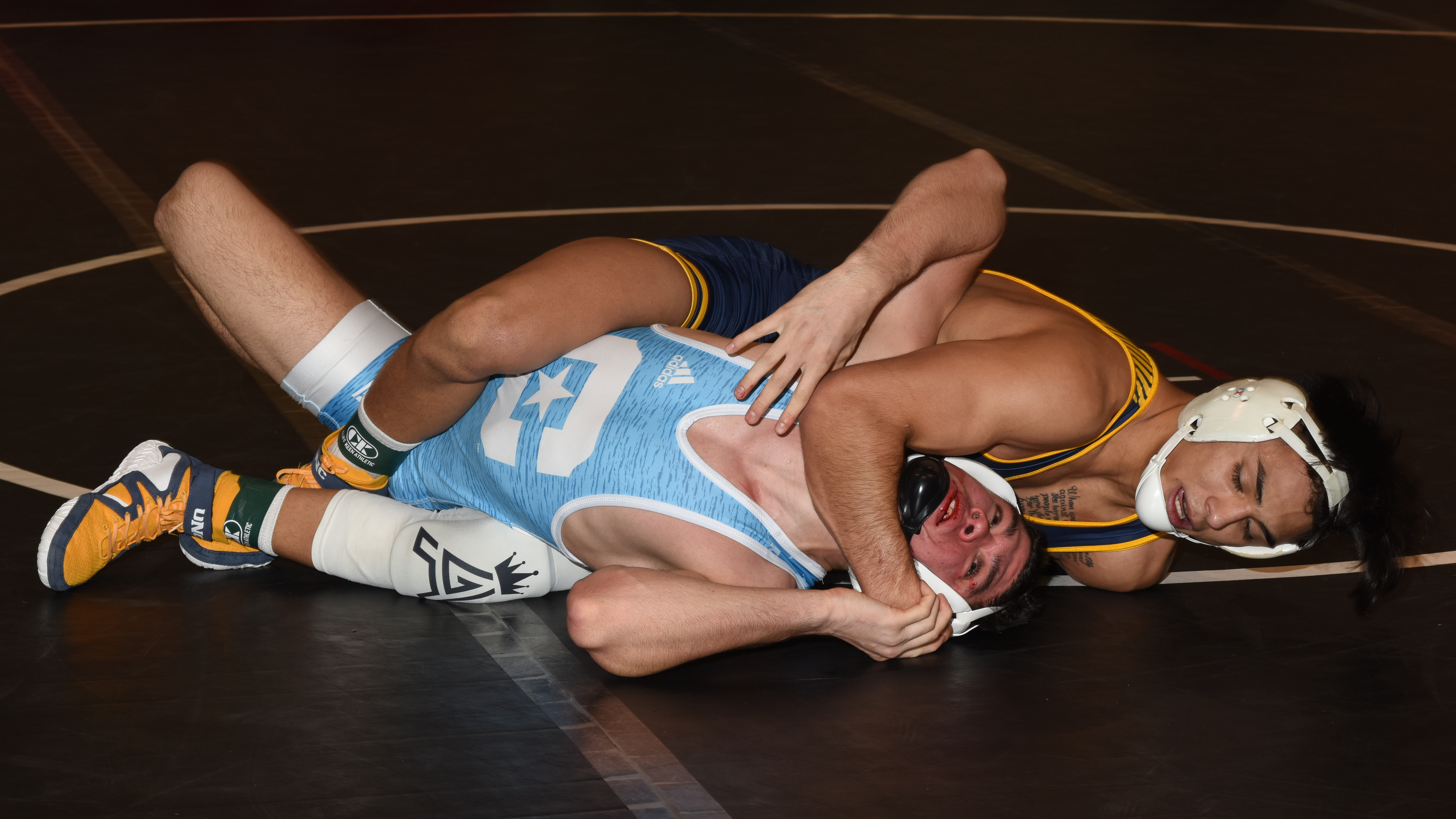
- Alirez in 2021
- Born: Andrew Michael Alirez; August 19, 2000 (age 26); Greeley, Colorado, U.S.
- Height: 5 ft 6 in (168 cm)
- Weight: 141 lb (64 kg; 10 st 1 lb)
- Division: Bantamweight (MMA); 65 kg (wrestling)
- Style: Wrestling
- Fighting out of: Greeley, Colorado, U.S.
- Team: Pound 4 Pound Muay Thai; Catalyst Jiu-Jitsu
- Trainer: MMA: Said Saparov; Jiu-jitsu: Trevor Polhamus
- Years active: 2018–present

Mixed martial arts record
- Total: 1
- Wins: 1
- By knockout: 1
- Losses: 0

Other information
- University: University of Northern Colorado (2019–2025)
- Notable school: Greeley Central High School (2015–2019)

Andrew Michael Alirez (born August 19, 2000) is an American mixed martial artist and freestyle wrestler. He competes at Bantamweight in MMA and 65 kilograms in wrestling.

Alirez was a four-time CHSAA champion in high school wrestling. He was an NCAA Champion in collegiate wrestling (2023). At the national level, Alirez was a two-time champion in freestyle. Internationally, he was a winner of the Poland Open (2023).

== Career ==
=== Wrestling ===
==== 2015–2019 ====
Alirez attended Greeley Central High School, where he was a four-time state champion, multiple-time US freestyle All-American and a U20 Pan American champion.

The top-recruit in the country, Alirez committed to the University of Northern Colorado.

==== 2019–2020 ====
At the beginning of the year, Alirez recorded a fourth-place finish at the Dave Schultz Memorial International in freestyle, with a notable win over two-time NCAA champion Dean Heil . Back to folkstyle, Alirez, a true freshman, took first at the Northern Colorado and the Cowboy Open tournaments, as well as second at the Southern Scuffle, during regular season.

After a fourth-place finish at the Big 12 Championships, it was announced that the NCAA National Championships had been cancelled due to the COVID-19 pandemic, cutting his season short to end it with a 23–4 record.

==== 2020–2021 ====
Before the season, Alirez claimed the US National Championship at 65 kilograms in freestyle, recording wins over US Open runner-up Joseph McKenna and veteran Evan Henderson. Back to folkstyle, Alirez went 4–0 during the season before surrendering to an injury, but still qualified for the NCAA tournament.

==== 2021–2022 ====
After dropping down from 149 to 141 pounds, Alirez placed second and third respectively at the CKLV Invitational and the Southern Scuffle during regular season. Alirez then claimed his first Big 12 Championship title with wins over highly ranked wrestlers, but fell short of All-American honors at the NCAA National Championships, ending his season with a 24–5 record.

==== 2022–2023 ====
During regular season, Alirez compiled an undefeated record and racked up titles from the Cougar Clash Invite and the Southern Scuffle. He then earned his second-straight Big 12 Championship before the National tournament.

At the NCAA tournament, Alirez became the first NCAA Division I National champion in UNC's history, with hard-fought wins over Lachlan McNeil from North Carolina, Beau Bartlett from Penn State and Real Woods from University of Iowa, to close out an undefeated season with 28 wins and no losses. After the season, he was named the Big 12 Wrestler of the Year, and was a Dan Hodge Trophy finalist.

In July, Alirez went back to freestyle to compete at the Poland Open, where he notably took out three-time World Champion Haji Aliyev in the first round to advance and defeat All-American Josh Finesilver, and lastly, took a forfeit over Mikyay Naim to claim the title.

In September, Alirez announced he would be using an Olympic redshirt for the 2023–2024 season. On December, Alirez became a two-time US National champion in freestyle with wins over All-Americans Beau Bartlett and Austin DeSanto, and US Open champion Alec Pantaleo, qualifying for the 2024 US Olympic Team Trials.

==== 2024 ====
In April, Alirez competed at the US Olympic Team Trials, where after defeating NCAA finalist Beau Bartlett, he fell to US National champion and top-seeded Nick Lee in a tight loss, and subsequently forfeited out of the tournament. In June, he fell to fellow NCAA champion Jesse Mendez at Beat the Streets.

==== 2026 ====
Alirez debuted for Real American Freestyle at RAF 06 on February 28, 2026, defeating Bryce Meredith by technical fall.

He defeated Jaydin Eierman by decision at RAF 10 on June 13, 2026.

=== Mixed martial arts ===
In April 2026, Alirez announced that he would not attempt qualifying for the 2028 Summer Olympics in wrestling, and would instead pursue a career in mixed martial arts.

Alirez won his mixed martial arts debut at Sparta Sports and Entertainment's AVM 17 event on April 25, 2026, defeating Bruce Martin by technical knockout.

== Mixed martial arts record ==
Professional record breakdown
1 match	1 win	0 losses
By knockout	1	0

Res.	Record	Opponent	Method	Event	Date	Round	Time	Location	Notes
Win	1–0	Bruce Martin	TKO (punches)	Sparta: Army vs. Marines 17	April 25, 2026	1	0:43	Loveland, Colorado, United States	Catchweight (140 lb) bout.

== Freestyle record ==
Senior Freestyle Matches
Res.	Record	Opponent	Score	Date	Event	Location
Win	19–4	(United States) Jaydin Eierman	5–3	June 13, 2026	RAF 10	(United States) St. Louis, Missouri
Win	18–4	(United States) Bryce Meredith	TF 13–2	February 28, 2026	RAF 06	(United States) Tempe, Arizona
Loss	17–4	(United States) Jesse Mendez	1–4	June 5, 2024	2024 Beat the Streets	(United States) New York City, New York
2024 US Olympic Team Trials DNP at 65 kg
Loss		(United States) Nahshon Garrett	FF	April 19, 2024	2024 US Olympic Team Trials	(United States) State College, Pennsylvania
Loss	17–3	(United States) Nick Lee	9–11	April 19, 2024	2024 US Olympic Team Trials	(United States) State College, Pennsylvania
Win	17–2	(United States) Beau Bartlett	6–2	April 19, 2024	2024 US Olympic Team Trials	(United States) State College, Pennsylvania
2023 US Nationals (gold) at 65 kg
Win	16–2	(United States) Beau Bartlett	8–0	December 16–17, 2023	2023 US Senior Nationals	(United States) Fort Worth, Texas
Win	15–2	(United States) Alec Pantaleo	4–3	December 16–17, 2023	2023 US Senior Nationals	(United States) Fort Worth, Texas
Win	14–2	(United States) Austin DeSanto	TF 10–0	December 16–17, 2023	2023 US Senior Nationals	(United States) Fort Worth, Texas
Win	13–2	(United States) Henry Porter	TF 10–0	December 16–17, 2023	2023 US Senior Nationals	(United States) Fort Worth, Texas
2023 Poland Open (gold) at 65 kg
Win		(Bulgaria) Mikyay Naim	FF	July 26–30, 2023	2023 Poland Open	Warsaw, Poland
Win	12–2	(Israel) Josh Finesilver	TF 10–0	July 26–30, 2023	2023 Poland Open	Warsaw, Poland
Win	11–2	(Azerbaijan) Haji Aliyev	8–0	July 26–30, 2023	2023 Poland Open	Warsaw, Poland
2020 US Nationals (gold) at 65 kg
Win	10–2	(United States) Evan Henderson	5–1	October 9–11, 2020	2020 US Senior Nationals	(United States) Coralville, Iowa
Win	9–2	(United States) Yahya Thomas	7–1	October 9–11, 2020	2020 US Senior Nationals	(United States) Coralville, Iowa
Win	8–2	(United States) Joseph McKenna	6–4	October 9–11, 2020	2020 US Senior Nationals	(United States) Coralville, Iowa
Win	7–2	(United States) Mitch McKee	11–5	October 9–11, 2020	2020 US Senior Nationals	(United States) Coralville, Iowa
Win	6–2	(United States) Josh Heil	TF 10–0	October 9–11, 2020	2020 US Senior Nationals	(United States) Coralville, Iowa
Win	5–2	(United States) Lawrence Saenz	TF 10–0	October 9–11, 2020	2020 US Senior Nationals	(United States) Coralville, Iowa
2019 Dave Schultz Memorial 4th at 65 kg
Loss	4–2	(United States) Bryce Meredith	2–7	January 24–26, 2019	2019 Dave Schultz Memorial International	(United States) Colorado Springs, Colorado
Win	4–1	(United States) Dean Heil	12–4	January 24–26, 2019	2019 Dave Schultz Memorial International	(United States) Colorado Springs, Colorado
Win	3–1	(United States) Jordin Humphrey	TF 10–0	January 24–26, 2019	2019 Dave Schultz Memorial International	(United States) Colorado Springs, Colorado
Win	2–1	(United States) Joey Lazor	8–2	January 24–26, 2019	2019 Dave Schultz Memorial International	(United States) Colorado Springs, Colorado
Loss	1–1	(United States) Bryce Meredith	7–8	January 24–26, 2019	2019 Dave Schultz Memorial International	(United States) Colorado Springs, Colorado
Win	1–0	(Canada) Adam MacFadyen	TF 10–0	January 24–26, 2019	2019 Dave Schultz Memorial International	(United States) Colorado Springs, Colorado

== NCAA stats ==
Season	Year	School	Rank	Weigh Class	Record	Win	Bonus
2025	Senior	University of Northern Colorado	#9 (DNP)	141	17-3	85.00%	55.00%
2024	Olympic RS	University of Northern Colorado		141			
2023	Senior	University of Northern Colorado	#1 (1st)	141	28–0	100.00%	71.43%
2022	Junior	University of Northern Colorado	#13 (DNP)	141	23–5	82.14%	35.71%
2021	Sophomore	University of Northern Colorado	#6 (DNQ)	149	4–0	100.00%	75.00%
2020	Freshman	University of Northern Colorado	#11	149	23–4	85.19%	55.56%
Career					78–9	89.77%	55.06%
