= Jesse Mendez =

American wrestler (born 2003)

Personal information
- Full name: Jesse Wayne Mendez
- Born: April 28, 2003 (age 23) Crown Point, Indiana, U.S.
- Weight: 65 kg (143 lb)

Sport
- Country: United States
- Sport: Wrestling
- Events: Freestyle and Folkstyle
- College team: Ohio State
- Club: Ohio Regional Training Center; Titan Mercury Wrestling Club
- Coached by: Tom Ryan
Medal record
Men's freestyle wrestling
Representing the United States
US National Championships
Silver medal – second place	2025 Las Vegas	65 kg
Bronze medal – third place	2022 Las Vegas	61 kg
U20 World Championships
Silver medal – second place	2023 Amman	65 kg
U17 Pan American Championships
Gold medal – first place	2019 Morelia	60 kg
Men's collegiate wrestling
Representing Ohio State Buckeyes
NCAA Division I Championships
Silver medal – second place	2026 Cleveland	141 lb
Gold medal – first place	2025 Philadelphia	141 lb
Gold medal – first place	2024 Kansas City	141 lb
Big Ten Championships
Gold medal – first place	2026 State College	141 lb
Gold medal – first place	2024 College Park	141 lb

Jesse Wayne Mendez (born April 28, 2003) is an American freestyle and graduated folkstyle wrestler who competes at 65 kilograms. In freestyle, he claimed a silver medal at the 2023 U20 World Championships.

In folkstyle, Mendez was a two-time NCAA Division I National champion at 141 pounds, as well as a four-time All-American for the Ohio State Buckeyes.

== Folkstyle career ==
=== Ohio State University ===
Mendez was just the 10th wrestler to win four Indiana wrestling state titles capping off a 157-1 high school career. Mendez also competed for team USA at the 2019 Cadet Worlds and 2021 Junior Worlds.

==== 2022-2023 ====
Mendez started as a true freshman for the Buckeyes at 133 lbs. Mendez had a strong regular season finishing 13–3 with notable losses to Vito Arujau 6-1 and Roman Bravo-Young 8–2. Mendez finished his first Big 10 tournament with a sixth-place finish going 1–3. Mendez kicked off his first NCAA tournament with a 12-4 major decision over Brendan Ferretti of Navy. Mendez was sent to the consolation bracket after a 6–2 loss to Arizona State's Michael McGee. Mendez then rattled off four straight wins including wins over Lucas Byrd of Illinois and avenging a regular season loss against Sam Latona of Virginia Tech to land on the podium. Mendez finished the tournament with back-to-back losses to Michael McGee and Aaron Nagao of Minnesota to cap off a sixth-place finish as a true freshman.

==== 2023-2024 ====
Up at 141 lb Mendez's sophomore campaign started off strong winning Big 10 wrestler of the week after a 5–0 run to winning a CKLV title defeating three Top 15 ranked wrestlers including Brock Hardy of Nebraska, Vince Cornella of Cornell before winning the title match over No. 7 Ryan Jack of NC State by decision, 5–2. Mendez improved to 25–2 on the season by capturing his first Big 10 tournament title by avenging an earlier loss against Penn State's Beau Bartlett in a 4-1 decision. Mendez kicked off the NCAA tournament with bonus wins of Todd Carter of Gardner Webb 19-4 and a fall of Chattanooga's Isaiah Powe. In the quarterfinals Mendez defeated Big 10 foe Brock Hardy by 6-2 decision. In the semifinals Mendez defeated Iowa State's Anthony Echemendia 6–4 to advance to the finals in a rematch of the Big 10 conference tournament. Mendez became an NCAA tournament champion by defeating Bartlett 4–1.

==== 2024-2025 ====
Mendez returned for his junior year to 141 lb as the returning champion at the weight class. Mendez suffered his only regular season loss of the season to rival Beau Bartlett 4–2 in the Penn State-Ohio State dual meet. Mendez finished fourth at the Big 10 conference tournament after falling 9–8 to Nebraska's Brock Hardy in the B10 Semi-Finals. Mendez once again fell to Bartlett 4–2 in the third-place match. Mendez began his third NCAA tournament with bonus wins over Briar Priest of Pittsburgh, Sergio Lemley of Michigan and Vance Vombaur of Minnesota. Mendez revenged two losses during the season by taking out Bartlett 2–1 in tiebreakers to advance to his second straight NCAA final. Mendez captured his second NCAA 141 lb title by revenging a conference tournament loss to Brock Hardy 12–9.

== Freestyle record ==
Senior freestyle matches
Res.	Record	Opponent	Score	Date	Event	Location
2026 US Open 6th at 65 kg
Loss		(United States) Pierson Manville	FF	April 24–25, 2026	2026 US Open National Championships	(United States) Las Vegas, Nevada
Loss	19–9	(United States) Joseph McKenna	2–3	April 24–25, 2026	2026 US Open National Championships	(United States) Las Vegas, Nevada
Win	19–8	(United States) Brock Hardy	5–4	April 24–25, 2026	2026 US Open National Championships	(United States) Las Vegas, Nevada
Win	18–8	(United States) Ethan Fernandez	6–3	April 24–25, 2026	2026 US Open National Championships	(United States) Las Vegas, Nevada
2025 US World Team Trials DNP at 65 kg
Loss		(United States) Carter Young	FF	May 16–17, 2025	2025 US World Team Trials Challenge	(United States) Louisville, Kentucky
Loss	17-8	(United States) Real Woods	9-11	May 16–17, 2025	2025 US World Team Trials Challenge	(United States) Louisville, Kentucky
Win	17-6	(United States) Marcus Blaze	4-1	May 16–17, 2025	2025 US World Team Trials Challenge	(United States) Louisville, Kentucky
2025 US Open (silver) 65 kg
Loss	16-7	(United States) Joseph McKenna	2-3	April 23, 2025	2025 CLAW US Open – 65 kg	(United States) Las Vegas, Nevada
Win	16-6	(United States) Beau Bartlett	4-2	April 23, 2025	2025 CLAW US Open – 65 kg	(United States) Las Vegas, Nevada
Win	15-6	(United States) Vince Cornella	TF 15–4	April 23, 2025	2025 CLAW US Open – 65 kg	(United States) Las Vegas, Nevada
Win	14-6	(United States) Ethan Rossi	TF 12–2	April 23, 2025	2025 CLAW US Open – 65 kg	(United States) Las Vegas, Nevada
Win	13-6	(United States) Andrew Alirez	4-1	June 5, 2024	2024 Beat the Streets	(United States) New York City, New York
2024 US Olympic Team Trials 4th at 65 kg
Loss	12–6	(United States) Joseph McKenna	4–4	April 19–20, 2024	2024 US Olympic Team Trials	(United States) State College, Pennsylvania
Win	12–5	(United States) Nahshon Garrett	TF 11–0	April 19–20, 2024	2024 US Olympic Team Trials	(United States) State College, Pennsylvania
Loss	11–5	(United States) Zain Retherford	2–3	April 19–20, 2024	2024 US Olympic Team Trials	(United States) State College, Pennsylvania
Win	11–4	(United States) Yianni Diakomihalis	12–7	April 19–20, 2024	2024 US Olympic Team Trials	(United States) State College, Pennsylvania
Win	10–4	(United States) James Green	6–3	April 19–20, 2024	2024 US Olympic Team Trials	(United States) State College, Pennsylvania
Win	9–4	(United States) Joseph McKenna	8–2	April 19–20, 2024	2024 US Olympic Team Trials	(United States) State College, Pennsylvania
2023 Bill Farrell Memorial DNP at 57 kg
Loss		(United States) Henry Porter	FF	November 18, 2023	2023 Bill Farrell Memorial International	(United States) New York City, New York
Loss	8–4	(United States) Kaleb Larkin	6–7	November 18, 2023	2023 Bill Farrell Memorial International	(United States) New York City, New York
Win	8–3	(Guam) Ethan Aguigui	TF 10–0	November 18, 2023	2023 Bill Farrell Memorial International	(United States) New York City, New York
2022 US World Team Trials DNP at 61 kg
Loss	7–3	(United States) Josh Rodriguez	2–5	May 21–22, 2022	2022 US World Team Trials	(United States) Coralville, Iowa
Win	7–2	(United States) Shelton Mack	TF 10–0	May 21–22, 2022	2022 US World Team Trials	(United States) Coralville, Iowa
Loss	6–2	(United States) Seth Gross	12–13	May 21–22, 2022	2022 US World Team Trials	(United States) Coralville, Iowa
2022 US Open (bronze) at 61 kg
Win		(United States) Daniel Deshazer	FF	April 27 – May 1, 2022	2022 US Open National Championships	(United States) Las Vegas, Nevada
Win		(United States) Tyler Graff	FF	April 27 – May 1, 2022	2022 US Open National Championships	(United States) Las Vegas, Nevada
Win	6–1	(United States) Josh Kramer	8–4	April 27 – May 1, 2022	2022 US Open National Championships	(United States) Las Vegas, Nevada
Win	5–1	(United States) Paul Bianchi	TF 10–0	April 27 – May 1, 2022	2022 US Open National Championships	(United States) Las Vegas, Nevada
Win	4–1	(United States) Mitchell Brown	TF 10–0	April 27 – May 1, 2022	2022 US Open National Championships	(United States) Las Vegas, Nevada
Win	3–1	(United States) Ethan Rotondo	TF 12–0	April 27 – May 1, 2022	2022 US Open National Championships	(United States) Las Vegas, Nevada
Loss	2–1	(United States) Daniel Deshazer	5–6	April 27 – May 1, 2022	2022 US Open National Championships	(United States) Las Vegas, Nevada
Win	2–0	(United States) Joseph Pins	TF 10–0	April 27 – May 1, 2022	2022 US Open National Championships	(United States) Las Vegas, Nevada
Win	1–0	(United States) Kyle Smith	TF 10–0	April 27 – May 1, 2022	2022 US Open National Championships	(United States) Las Vegas, Nevada
