= Nick Lee (wrestler) =

American wrestler (born 1998)

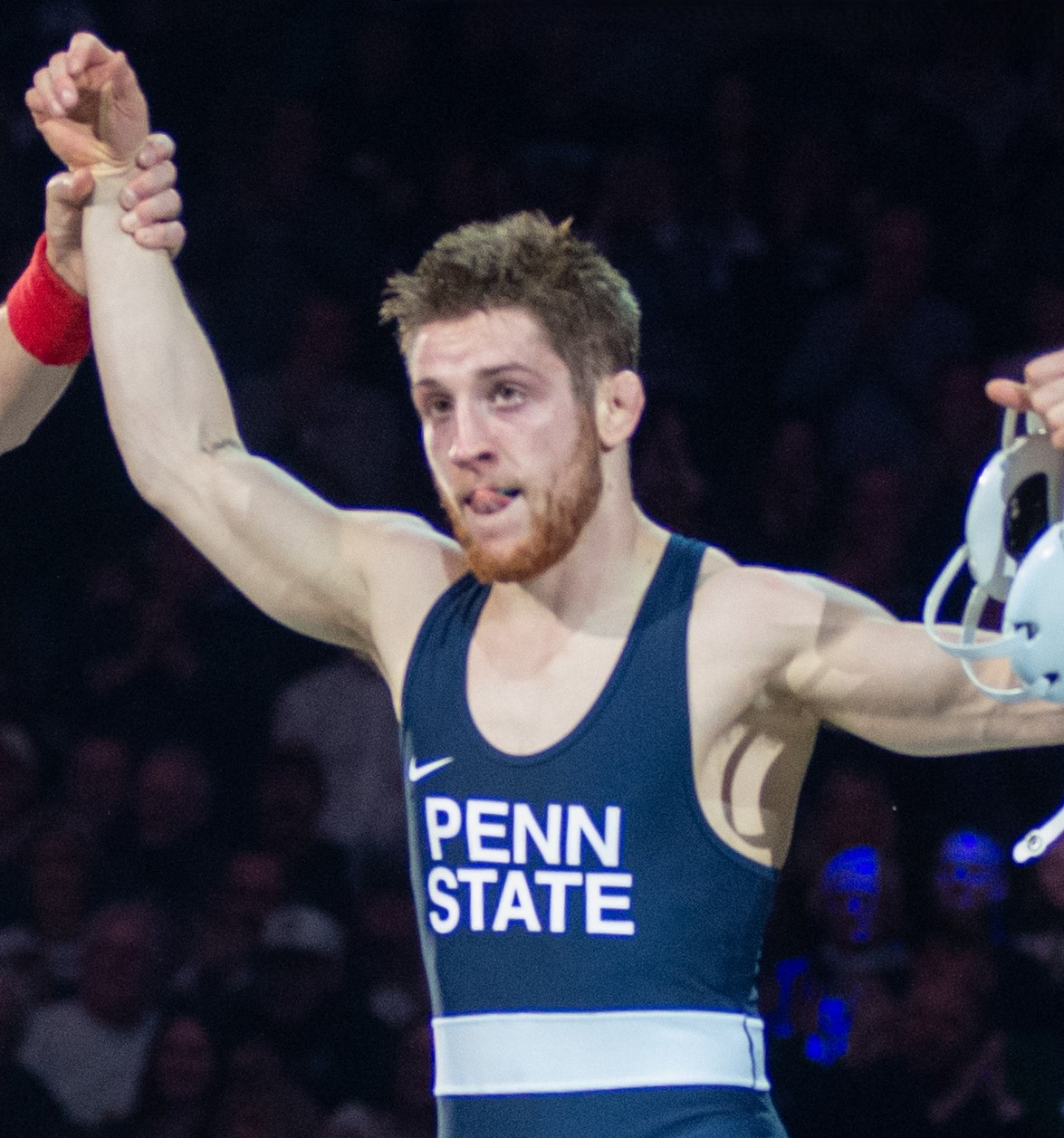
- Lee with Penn State in 2020

Personal information
- Full name: Nicholas Boone Lee
- Born: March 12, 1998 (age 28) Evansville, Indiana, U.S.

Sport
- Country: United States
- Sport: Wrestling
- Events: Freestyle and Folkstyle
- College team: Penn State Nittany Lions
- Club: Nittany Lion Wrestling Club
- Team: USA
- Coached by: Cael Sanderson
Medal record
Men's freestyle wrestling
Representing the United States
Pan American Championships
Gold medal – first place	2024 Acapulco	65 kg
Grand Prix
Silver medal – second place	2023 Budapest	65 kg
US National Championships
Gold medal – first place	2023 Las Vegas	65 kg
Bronze medal – third place	2019 Fort Worth	65 kg
Men's collegiate wrestling
Representing the Penn State Nittany Lions
NCAA Division I Championships
Gold medal – first place	2021 St. Louis	141 lb
Gold medal – first place	2022 Detroit	141 lb
Big Ten Championships
Gold medal – first place	2022 Lincoln	141 lb
Silver medal – second place	2020 Piscataway	141 lb
Silver medal – second place	2021 State College	141 lb
Bronze medal – third place	2018 East Lansing	141 lb
Bronze medal – third place	2019 Minneapolis	141 lb

Nicholas Boone Lee (born March 12, 1998) is an American freestyle and former folkstyle wrestler who competes at 65 kilograms. He is also an assistant coach for the Penn State wrestling team. In freestyle, he is a Pan American champion and a US National champion. Lee represented the United States at 65 kg at the 2023 World Championships.

In folkstyle, Lee was a two-time NCAA Division I National champion and a Big Ten Conference champion out of the Pennsylvania State University.

== Career ==
=== High school ===
A native of Evansville, Indiana, Lee attended Mater Dei High School, where he was a IHSAA state champion along with his two brothers Joe and Matt. In freestyle, he was a two-time Fargo National champion.

A Penn State commit, Lee decided to forego his senior year and graduated early in order to train at the Nittany Lion Wrestling Club.

=== Pennsylvania State University ===
==== 2016–2017 ====
While not officially attending the Pennsylvania State University, Lee went 2–2 at the Bill Farrell Memorial International in freestyle in November 2016. In February of the following year, Lee placed third at the Edinboro Open while wrestling unattached. Back to freestyle, Lee placed fifth at the U20 US Nationals. Lee also beat Sammy Sasso at Who's Number 1 and Kanen Storr in the Fargo Finals to affirm his ranking of #1 in the country his senior year.

==== 2017–2018 ====
Competing under a redshirt, Lee placed first at the Mat Town Open, second at the Southern Scuffle and Clarion Open, and third at the Binghamtom Open. In January, Lee's redshirt was pulled, competing as a true freshman instead.

After a third-place finish at the Big Ten Championships, he became an All-American with a fifth-place finish at the NCAA tournament, closing off the year at 32–7. Lee then competed at the U20 US World Team Trials, placing second.

==== 2018–2019 ====
During the regular season of his sophomore year, Lee claimed titles from the Southern Scuffle and Keystone Classic. At the Big Ten Championships he once again placed third, before repeating as an All-American with another fifth-place finish at the NCAA tournament to close off the year at 31–4.

==== 2019–2020 ====
In the midst of folkstyle season, Lee placed third at the 2019 US National Championships with notable wins over Olympian Frank Molinaro, US National runner-up Jaydin Eierman and NCAA runner-up Ethan Lizak, qualifying for the US Olympic Team Trials.

After winning the Black Knight Invitational during regular season, Lee improved to a second-place finish at the Big Ten Championships to close out the year at 20–1. The NCAA championships were then cancelled by the COVID-19 pandemic, leaving Lee, the second-seed, and all other wrestlers unable to compete.

==== 2020–2021 ====
After several months off competition, Lee won two freestyle matches at the NLWC III and NLWC IV. Back to folkstyle, Lee placed second at the Big Ten tournament before becoming an NCAA National champion, defeating Eierman in the finals, whom he lost to in the Big Ten finals. Lee closed out the year at 13–1.

Fresh as an NCAA champion, Lee competed at the rescheduled US Olympic Team Trials in April, securing a prestigious third-place finish with a lone loss to two-time NCAA champion Jordan Oliver, and notable wins over three-time NCAA champion Zain Retherford, two-time U17 World champion Yianni Diakomihalis, NCAA champion Nahshon Garrett and U20 World finalist Mitch McKee.

==== 2021–2022 ====
Lee went undefeated during his senior year of collegiate wrestling, becoming a two-time NCAA champion and a Big Ten champion with a 21–0 record. Lee was then named the Penn State Male Athlete of the Year, and closed off his career as a two-time NCAA champion and a four-time All-American with a record of 116–13.

Back to freestyle, Lee was unable to place at the US World Team Trials Challenge tournament in May. In November, he placed second at the Bill Farrell Memorial, notably defeating U23 World silver medalist Adlan Askarov in the first round.

==== 2023 ====
To start off January, Lee placed seventh at the Grand Prix Zagreb Open, defeating eventual 2023 World finalist Sebastian Rivera before falling to eventual 2023 World champion Ismail Musukaev. On April, Lee became the US Open National champion, with wins over two-time Pan American champion Joseph McKenna and U20 World medalist Beau Bartlett, qualifying for Final X.

At Final X, in June, Lee defeated four-time NCAA champion Yianni Diakomihalis in two close matches to make the US World Team. In July, Lee made the Polyák Imre & Varga János Memorial finals, with wins over World medalist Alibek Osmonov and European medalist Islam Dudaev, before falling to World medalist Tömör-Ochiryn Tulga.

At the World Championships, Lee advanced with wins over European medalist Krzysztof Bienkowski, NCAA All-American Austin Gomez and U20 World champion Umidjon Jalolov, before being eliminated by returning World champion Rahman Amouzad, placing seventh in his first showing at the tournament.

==== 2024 ====
To start off February, Lee beat rival Yianni Diakomihalis on points in a US Pan American Qualifier wrestle-off, before Diakomihalis forfeited the next match due to injury.

He then competed at the Pan American Championships later in the month, claiming the gold medal. At the Pan American Olympic Qualification Tournament, Lee was defeated by Mexico's Austin Gomez and was therefore unable to qualify the weight for the United States.

In April, he competed at the US Olympic Team Trials as the top-seed, where after defeating two-time Pan American champion Alec Pantaleo and two-time US National champion Andrew Alirez, he fell to reigning World champion and teammate Zain Retherford in two straight matches to place second.

In May, Lee was named an assistant coach of the Penn State wrestling team under head coach Cael Sanderson. Despite his new position, Lee emphasized that he was "definitely not retired" from competition.

== Freestyle record ==
Senior Freestyle Matches
Res.	Record	Opponent	Score	Date	Event	Location
Loss	36–14	(Russia) Abasgadzhi Magomedov	TF 0–10	November 8, 2025	PWL 10	Moscow, Russia
2024 US Olympic Team Trials (silver) at 65 kg
Loss	36–13	(United States) Zain Retherford	0–5	April 20, 2024	2024 US Olympic Team Trials	(United States) State College, Pennsylvania
Loss	36–12	(United States) Zain Retherford	1–2	April 20, 2024	2024 US Olympic Team Trials	(United States) State College, Pennsylvania
Win	36–11	(United States) Andrew Alirez	11–9	April 19, 2024	2024 US Olympic Team Trials	(United States) State College, Pennsylvania
Win	35–11	(United States) Alec Pantaleo	9–2	April 19, 2024	2024 US Olympic Team Trials	(United States) State College, Pennsylvania
2024 Pan American Olympic Qualification 9th at 65 kg
Loss	34–11	(Mexico) Austin Gomez	TF 12–22	March 1, 2024	2024 Pan American Olympic Qualification Tournament	Acapulco, Mexico
2024 Pan American Championships (gold) at 65 kg
Win		(Argentina) Agustin Destribats	INJ	February 24, 2024	2024 Pan American Continental Championships	Acapulco, Mexico
Win	34–10	(Canada) Jacob Alexander Torres	TF 10–0	February 24, 2024	2024 Pan American Continental Championships	Acapulco, Mexico
Win	33–10	(Ecuador) Josh Kramer	TF 10–0	February 24, 2024	2024 Pan American Continental Championships	Acapulco, Mexico
2024 US Pan American Qualifier (gold) at 65 kg
Win		(United States) Yianni Diakomihalis	FF	February 3, 2024	2024 US Pan American Qualifier	(United States) Denver, Colorado
Win	32–10	(United States) Yianni Diakomihalis	12–3	February 3, 2024	2024 US Pan American Qualifier	(United States) Denver, Colorado
2023 World Championships 7th at 65 kg
Loss	31–10	(Iran) Rahman Amouzad	4–7	September 18, 2023	2023 World Championships	Belgrade, Serbia
Win	31–9	(Uzbekistan) Umidjon Jalolov	4–3	September 18, 2023	2023 World Championships	Belgrade, Serbia
Win	30–9	(Mexico) Austin Gomez	Fall	September 18, 2023	2023 World Championships	Belgrade, Serbia
Win	29–9	(Poland) Krzysztof Bieńkowski	6–0	September 18, 2023	2023 World Championships	Belgrade, Serbia
2023 Polyák Imre & Varga János Memorial (silver) at 65 kg
Loss	28–9	(Mongolia) Tömör-Ochiryn Tulga	TF 0–10	July 13–16, 2023	2023 Polyák Imre & Varga János Memorial Tournament	Budapest, Hungary
Win	28–8	(Albania) Islam Dudaev	6–4	July 13–16, 2023	2023 Polyák Imre & Varga János Memorial Tournament	Budapest, Hungary
Win	27–8	(Kyrgyzstan) Alibek Osmonov	TF 10–0	July 13–16, 2023	2023 Polyák Imre & Varga János Memorial Tournament	Budapest, Hungary
Win	26–8	(Israel) Josh Finesilver	TF 10–0	July 13–16, 2023	2023 Polyák Imre & Varga János Memorial Tournament	Budapest, Hungary
2023 US World Team Trials (gold) at 65 kg
Win	25–8	(United States) Yianni Diakomihalis	8–8	June 10, 2023	2023 Final X Newark	(United States) Newark, New Jersey
Win	24–8	(United States) Yianni Diakomihalis	7–6	June 10, 2023	2023 Final X Newark	(United States) Newark, New Jersey
2023 US Open (gold) at 65 kg
Win	23–8	(United States) Joseph McKenna	10–5	April 26–30, 2023	2023 US Open National Championships	(United States) Las Vegas, Nevada
Win	22–8	(United States) Beau Bartlett	10–10	April 26–30, 2023	2023 US Open National Championships	(United States) Las Vegas, Nevada
Win	21–8	(United States) Matthew Kolodzik	TF 12–1	April 26–30, 2023	2023 US Open National Championships	(United States) Las Vegas, Nevada
Win	20–8	(United States) Jason Miranda	TF 10–0	April 26–30, 2023	2023 US Open National Championships	(United States) Las Vegas, Nevada
Win	19–8	(United States) Hayden Bates	TF 10–0	April 26–30, 2023	2023 US Open National Championships	(United States) Las Vegas, Nevada
2023 Grand Prix Zagreb Open 7th at 65 kg
Loss	18–8	(Hungary) Ismail Musukaev	TF 0–11	February 1, 2023	2023 Grand Prix Zagreb Open	Zagreb, Croatia
Win	18–7	(Puerto Rico) Sebastian Rivera	TF 13–2	February 1, 2023	2023 Grand Prix Zagreb Open	Zagreb, Croatia
2022 Bill Farrell Memorial (silver) at 65 kg
Loss	17–7	(Kyrgyzstan) Taiyrbek Zhumashbek Uulu	TF 4–14	November 18–19, 2022	2022 Bill Farrell Memorial International	(United States) New York City, New York
Win	17–6	(United States) Pat Lugo	4–0	November 18–19, 2022	2022 Bill Farrell Memorial International	(United States) New York City, New York
Win	16–6	(Tajikistan) Kamol Begakov	9–2	November 18–19, 2022	2022 Bill Farrell Memorial International	(United States) New York City, New York
Win	15–6	(Kazakhstan) Askarov Adlan	TF 18–8	November 18–19, 2022	2022 Bill Farrell Memorial International	(United States) New York City, New York
2022 US World Team Trials DNP at 65 kg
Loss	14–6	(United States) Joseph McKenna	TF 3–13	May 21–22, 2022	2022 US World Team Trials Challenge	(United States) Coralville, Iowa
Loss	14–5	(United States) Evan Henderson	11–12	May 21–22, 2022	2022 US World Team Trials Challenge	(United States) Coralville, Iowa
Win	14–4	(United States) Matthew Kolodzik	TF 12–2	May 21–22, 2022	2022 US World Team Trials Challenge	(United States) Coralville, Iowa
Win	13–4	(United States) Josh Saunders	10–3	May 21–22, 2022	2022 US World Team Trials Challenge	(United States) Coralville, Iowa
2020 US Olympic Team Trials (bronze) at 65 kg
Win	12–4	(United States) Yianni Diakomihalis	16–8	April 2–3, 2021	2020 US Olympic Team Trials	(United States) Fort Worth, Texas
Win	11–4	(United States) Zain Retherford	10–4	April 2–3, 2021	2020 US Olympic Team Trials	(United States) Fort Worth, Texas
Win	10–4	(United States) Nahshon Garrett	TF 12–2	April 2–3, 2021	2020 US Olympic Team Trials	(United States) Fort Worth, Texas
Loss	9–4	(United States) Jordan Oliver	3–8	April 2–3, 2021	2020 US Olympic Team Trials	(United States) Fort Worth, Texas
Win	9–3	(United States) Mitch McKee	TF 14–2	April 2–3, 2021	2020 US Olympic Team Trials	(United States) Fort Worth, Texas
Win	8–3	(United States) Tariq Wilson	14–10	December 22, 2020	NLWC IV	(United States) State College, Pennsylvania
Win	7–3	(United States) Brandon Wright	TF 10–0	November 24, 2020	NLWC III	(United States) State College, Pennsylvania
2019 US Nationals (bronze) at 65 kg
Win		(United States) Yianni Diakomihalis	FF	December 20–22, 2019	2019 US National Championships	(United States) Fort Worth, Texas
Win	6–3	(United States) Frank Molinaro	TF 10–0	December 20–22, 2019	2019 US National Championships	(United States) Fort Worth, Texas
Loss	5–3	(United States) Jordan Oliver	TF 0–10	December 20–22, 2019	2019 US National Championships	(United States) Fort Worth, Texas
Win	5–2	(United States) Joey Lazor	TF 10–0	December 20–22, 2019	2019 US National Championships	(United States) Fort Worth, Texas
Win	4–2	(United States) Jaydin Eierman	10–6	December 20–22, 2019	2019 US National Championships	(United States) Fort Worth, Texas
Win	3–2	(United States) Ethan Lizak	TF 10–0	December 20–22, 2019	2019 US National Championships	(United States) Fort Worth, Texas
2016 Bill Farrell Memorial DNP at 61 kg
Loss	2–2	(United States) Joey Lazor	TF 2–12	November 9–11, 2016	2016 Bill Farrell Memorial International	(United States) New York City, New York
Win	2–1	(United States) Shelton Mack	9–8	November 9–11, 2016	2016 Bill Farrell Memorial International	(United States) New York City, New York
Loss	1–1	(United States) Jayson Ness	TF 0–10	November 9–11, 2016	2016 Bill Farrell Memorial International	(United States) New York City, New York
Win	1–0	(United States) Alan Waters	TF 15–4	November 9–11, 2016	2016 Bill Farrell Memorial International	(United States) New York City, New York
