= Nittany Lion Wrestling Club =

Olympic training center in Pennsylvania, US

The Nittany Lion Wrestling Club (NLWC) is a wrestling club and nonprofit organization. It was designated by USA Wrestling as a U.S. Olympic Regional Training Center. It hosts its practices at the Penn State wrestling room in State College, Pennsylvania.

== Resident athletes ==
- Jordan Conaway
- Franklin Gómez
- Bo Nickal
- Joshua Rodriguez
- Zain Retherford
- Kyle Dake
- Thomas Gilman
- Kyle Snyder
- Anthony Cassar
- Roman Bravo-Young
- Ceron Francisco
- Nick Lee

== Coaching staff ==
- Cael Sanderson
- Cody Sanderson
- Casey Cunningham
- Jake Varner
- Mark McKnight
- Morgan McIntosh

== Key people ==
- Board of Directors
  - Jim Martin; President
  - Judd Arnold; Vice President
  - Bob Noll
  - Mary Noll
  - Matt Gaul
  - Dave Becker
  - Darrel Zaccagni
  - Bill Buckley
  Management
  - Rich Lorenzo; executive director of Treasurer
  - Nick Fanthorpe; Co-director and coach
  - Dave Hart; Director / Business Chair / Membership Chair and Secretary
  Commentators (events)
  - Jeff Byers
  - Bo Nickal

== Events ==
During the COVID-19 pandemic, the NLWC put on a series of dual meets due to the lack of wrestling events taking place. Streamed on Rofkin, the first card took place on September 19, 2020, in State College, Pennsylvania.

=== NLWC I ===
The NLWC I took place on September 19, 2020, in State College, Pennsylvania.

Results

NLWC I
Weight Class					Method	Round	Time	Notes
190 lbs	FS	(United States) Bo Nickal	def.	(United States) Alex Dieringer	1-1	2	3:00	
99 kg	FS	(United States) Kyle Snyder	def.	(United States) Michael Macchiavello	TF 12–0	2	0:16	
59 kg	FS	(United States) Thomas Gilman	def.	(United States) Darian Cruz	TF 14–4	2	2:20	
62 kg	WFS	(Mexico) Jane Valencia	def.	(United States) Julia Salata	6-6	2	3:00	
77 kg	FS	(United States) Logan Massa	def.	(Uzbekistan) Bekzod Abdurakhmonov	4-3	2	3:00	
125 kg	FS	(United States) Greg Kerkvliet	def.	(United States) Youssif Hemida	TF 10–0	1	2:43	
77 kg	FS	(United States) Vincenzo Joseph	def.	(United States) Dan Vallimont	5-0	2	3:00	
79 kg	FS	(United States) Jason Nolf	def.	(United States) David McFadden	5-2	2	3:00	
157 lbs	FS	(United States) Zain Retherford	def.	(United States) Alec Pantaleo	3-2	2	3:00	
196 lbs	FS	(Lebanon) Domenic Abounader	def.	(Puerto Rico) Jaime Espinal	7-2	2	3:00	
62 kg	WFS	(United States) Jennifer Page	def.	(United States) Desiree Zavala	14-10	2	3:00	
125 kg	FS	(United States) Jordan Wood	def.	(United States) Nick Nevills	6-4	2	3:00	
74 kg	FS	(United States) Rick Durso	def.	(San Marino) Malik Amine	TF 10–0	1	1:40	

=== NLWC II ===
The NLWC II took place on October 20, 2020, in State College, Pennsylvania.

Results

NLWC II
Weight Class					Method	Round	Time	Notes
167 lbs	FS	(United States) Jason Nolf	def.	(United States) Bubba Jenkins	TF 10–0	1	2:59	
140 lbs	FS	(United States) Roman Bravo-Young	def.	(United States) Shelton Mack	TF 11–0	2	0:48	
67 kg	FS	(United States) Bryce Meredith	def.	(United States) Beau Bartlett	8-6	2	3:00	
68 kg	WFS	(Mexico) Alejandra Romero	def.	(United States) Alexis Porter	3-0	2	3:00	
HWT	FS	(United States) Greg Kerkvliet	def.	(United States) Demetrius Thomas	TF 10–0	1	0_46	
205 lbs	FS	(United States) Michael Beard	def.	(United States) Greg Bulsak	10-9	2	3:00	
182 lbs	FS	(United States) Carter Starocci	def.	(United States) Devin Skatzka	Fall	1	2:59	
60 kg	WFS	(Mexico) Jane Valencia	def.	(United States) Vayle-Rae Baker	TF 13–2	2	2:02	
77 kg	FS	(Uzbekistan) Bekzod Abdurakhmonov	def.	(Colombia) Nestor Taffur	TF 12–2	2	0:31	
196 lbs	FS	(United States) Brett Pfarr	def.	(Puerto Rico) Jaime Espinal	TF 10–0	2	2:31	Espinal replaced Aaron Brooks on short notice.
155 lbs	FS	(United States) Jarod Verkleeren	def.	(United States) Brock Zacherl	TF 15–4	2	2:58	
155 lbs	FS	(United States) Terrell Barraclough	def.	(United States) Kyle Shoop	15-9	2	3:00	

=== NLWC III ===
The NLWC III took place on November 24, 2020, in State College, Pennsylvania.

Results

NLWC III
Weight Class					Method	Round	Time	Notes
86 kg	FS	(United States) David Taylor	def.	(United States) Gabe Dean	6-2	2	3:00	
65 kg	FS	(United States) Zain Retherford	def.	(United States) Reece Humphrey	TF 10–0	2	2:48	
57 kg	FS	(United States) Thomas Gilman	def.	(United States) Frank Perrelli	Fall	1	2:23	
59 kg	WFS	(United States) Jen Page	def.	(United States) Lauren Mason	10-4	2	3:00	
79 kg	FS	(United States) Carter Starocci	def.	(United States) Chance Marsteller	4-2	2	3:00	
176 lbs	FS	(United States) Nate Jackson	def.	(United States) Michael Beard	7-0	2	3:00	Beard replaced Bo Nickal on short notice.
86 kg	FS	(United States) Max Dean	def.	(United States) CJ Brucki	13-4	2	3:00	
74 kg	FS	(Puerto Rico) Franklin Gómez	def.	(Bulgaria) Borislav Novachkov	7-4	2	3:00	
165 lbs	FS	(United States) Joe Lee	def.	(United States) Zach Hartman	Fall	1	0:21	
125 kg	FS	(United States) Nick Nevills	def.	(United States) Mauro Correnti	TF 12–2	2	2:58	
67 kg	FS	(United States) Nick Lee	def.	(United States) Brandon Wright	TF 10–0	2	1:25	

=== NLWC IV ===
The NLWC IV (also known as NLWC vs. WWC) took place on December 22, 2020, in State College, Pennsylvania. Unlike previous cards, this event featured a dual meet between the NLWC and the Wolfpack Wrestling Club (WWC).

Results

NLWC IV
Weight Class					Method	Round	Time	Notes
Main card
65 kg	FS	(United States) Zain Retherford	def.	(India) Bajrang Punia	6-0	2	3:00	
150 lbs	FS	(United States) Roman Bravo-Young	def.	(United States) Aljamain Sterling	6-4	2	3:00	
	WFS	(Mexico) Jane Valencia	def.	(United States) Xochitl Mota-Pettis	4-4	2	3:00	
	FS	(United States) Nick Lee	def.	(United States) Tariq Wilson	14-10	2	3:00	
	FS	(United States) Hayden Hidlay	def.	(United States) Brady Berge	5-0	2	3:00	
79 kg	FS	(United States) Carter Starocci	def.	(United States) Daniel Bullard	TF 13–2	2	2:54	
74 kg	WFS	(United States) Emma Bruntil	def.	(United States) Jennifer Page	2-1	2	3:00	
97 kg	FS	(United States) Kyle Snyder	def.	(United States) Ty Walz	TF 10–0	2	2:02	
	FS	Santa Claus	def.	Grinch	Fall	1	3:00	
74 kg	FS	(Puerto Rico) Franklin Gomez	def.	(San Marino) Malik Amine	5-2	2	3:00	
Undercard
285 lbs	FS	(Pennsylvania) Greg Kerkvliet	def.	(North Carolina) Deonte Wilson	TF 10–0	1	0:43	
145 lbs	FS	(Pennsylvania) Luke Gardner	def.	(North Carolina) Kai Orine	9-3	2	3:00	
285 lbs	FS	(North Carolina) Tyrie Houghton	def.	(Pennsylvania) Austin Hoopes	TF 12–2	2	1:06	
188 lbs	FS	(North Carolina) Jacob Ferreria	def.	(Pennsylvania) Donovan Ball	3-1	2	3:00	
178 lbs	FS	(Pennsylvania) Creighton Edsell	def.	(North Carolina) Alex Falson	TF 10–0	1	1:17	
169 lbs	FS	(Pennsylvania) Aurelius Dunbar	def.	(North Carolina) Kai Bele	8-4	2	3:00	
169 lbs	FS	(Pennsylvania) Joe Lee	def.	(North Carolina) Tyler Barnes	TF 10–0	2	0:54	
161 lbs	FS	(Pennsylvania) Matt Lee	def.	(North Carolina) AJ Kovacs	7-4	2	3:00	
153 lbs	FS	(North Carolina) Hunter Lewis	def.	(Pennsylvania) Scott Obendorfer	Fall	2	1:27	
153 lbs	FS	(Pennsylvania) Bo Pipher	def.	(North Carolina) AJ Leitten	6-4	2	3:00	
153 lbs	FS	(North Carolina) Ed Scott	def.	(Pennsylvania) Terrell Barraclough	10-8	2	3:00	
145 lbs	FS	(Pennsylvania) Joey Blumer	def.	(North Carolina) Silas Shaw	TF 13–3	1	2:30	
285 lbs	FS	(North Carolina) Deonte Wilson	def.	(Pennsylvania) Seth Nevills	6-1	2	3:00	
145 lbs	FS	(Pennsylvania) Beau Bartlett	def.	(North Carolina) Kai Orine	TF 10–0	1	2:51	
137 lbs	FS	(Pennsylvania) David Evans	def.	(North Carolina) Alex Urquiza	TF 12–1	1	2:19	
137 lbs	FS	(North Carolina) Jarrett Trombley	def.	(Pennsylvania) Brandon Meredith	TF 12–2	2	1:46	
137 lbs	FS	(Pennsylvania) Baylor Shunk	def.	(North Carolina) Johnny Devine	5-4	2	3:00	

=== NLWC V ===
The NLWC V took place on February 23, 2021, in State College, Pennsylvania.

Results

NLWC III
Weight Class					Method	Round	Time	Notes
	FS	(United States) Kyle Dake	def.	(United States) Jason Nolf	5–0	2	3:00	
	FS	(United States) Kyle Snyder	def.	(United States) Gabe Dean	TF 13–2			
	FS	(United States) Zain Retherford	def.	(United States) Evan Henderson	6–2	2	3:00	
	FS	(United States) Vincenzo Joseph	def.	(Canada) Jevon Balfour	8–2	2	3:00	
	WFS	(Mexico) Jane Valencia	def.	(United States) Ronna Heaton	TF 12–2			
	FS	(United States) Thomas Gilman	def.	(United States) Sean Russell	TF 11–0	2	3:00	
	FS	(United States) Vito Arujau	def.	(United States) Zach Sanders	6–0	2	3:00	
	FS	(United States) Gabe Dean	def.	(United States) Bo Nickal	3–2	2	3:00	
	FS	(United States) Kyle Snyder	def.	(United States) Scott Boykin	TF 11–0			
	FS	(United States) Max Dean	def.	(United States) Nate Jackson	5–5	2	3:00	
	WFS	(Mexico) Ale Bonilla	def.	(United States) Kendall Bostelman	8–0	2	3:00	
	WFS	(United States) Mallory Velte	def.	(Mexico) Jen Page	6–1	2	3:00	
	FS	(United States) Kyle Dake	def.	(United States) Vincenzo Joseph	TF 10–0			
	FS	(United States) Jason Nolf	def.	(Canada) Jevon Balfour	TF 10–0			
	FS	(United States) Vito Arujau	def.	(United States) Sean Russell	TF 14–3			
	FS	(United States) Zach Sanders	def.	(United States) Thomas Gilman	Fall	1	1:47	
	FS	(United States) Kyle Snyder	def.	(United States) Nate Jackson	6–1	2	3:00	
