= Alec Pantaleo =

American wrestler (born 1996)

Personal information
- Full name: Alec William Pantaleo
- Born: July 9, 1996 (age 30) Canton, Michigan, U.S.
- Height: 1.68 m (5 ft 6 in)
- Weight: 70 kg (150 lb)

Sport
- Country: United States
- Sport: Wrestling
- Events: Freestyle and folkstyle
- College team: Michigan
- Club: Cliff Keen Wrestling Club
- Coached by: Sergei Beloglazov
Medal record
Men's freestyle wrestling
Representing United States
Pan American Championships
Gold medal – first place	2021 Guatemala City	70 kg
Gold medal – first place	2024 Acapulco	70 kg
World Cup
Gold medal – first place	2022 Coralville	Team
Grand Prix
Gold medal – first place	2020 La Habana	70 kg
Gold medal – first place	2021 Rome	70 kg
Gold medal – first place	2023 Nice	70 kg
Gold medal – first place	2023 Zagreb	70 kg
Silver medal – second place	2026 Tirana	70 kg
Bronze medal – third place	2026 Nice	70 kg
Waclaw Ziolkowski Memorial
Gold medal – first place	2021 Warsaw	70 kg
Silver medal – second place	2022 Warsaw	70 kg
US National Championships
Gold medal – first place	2022 Las Vegas	70 kg
Silver medal – second place	2021 Coralville	70 kg
Bronze medal – third place	2018 Las Vegas	70 kg
Collegiate Wrestling
Representing the Michigan Wolverines
NCAA Division I Championships
Bronze medal – third place	2019 Pittsburgh	157 lb
Big Ten Championships
Gold medal – first place	2018 East Lansing	157 lb
Bronze medal – third place	2016 Iowa City	157 lb
Bronze medal – third place	2019 Minneapolis	157 lb

Alec William Pantaleo (born July 9, 1996) is an American freestyle wrestler and graduated folkstyle wrestler who competes at 70 kilograms. In freestyle, he is the defending U.S. Open champion, was the 2021 Pan American Continental champion, claimed the 2021 Matteo Pellicone Ranking Series and the 2021 Poland Open titles, earned silver and bronze medals (2021 and 2018, respectively) at the U.S. Open, and was a 2019 U23 U.S. team member. As a folkstyle wrestler, Pantaleo was a three-time NCAA DI All-American and a Big Ten Conference champion out of the University of Michigan.

== Folkstyle career ==
=== High school ===
Born and raised in Michigan, Pantaleo attended Canton High School. While a high schooler, he became a MHSAA state champion as a sophomore and, after losing his junior season to injury, claimed runner-up honors at the state tournament as a senior, graduating with a 177–9 record and a 51–1 record in his last year.

=== College ===
After his high school career, Pantaleo was recruited by the University of Michigan.

==== 2014-15 ====
In his freshman year, Pantaleo made his collegiate debut at the Michigan State Open, claiming the title. An unseeded wrestler, he then went on to place second at the prestigious Cliff Keen Memorial Invitational and racked up an 8–4 dual record during regular season. At the Big Ten Conference Championships, he reached the consolation semifinals before being eliminated. At the NCAA tournament, he went 2–2.

==== 2015-16 ====
As a sophomore, Alec achieved All-American honors by placing sixth at the NCAA Division I national championships at 149 lbs. He pinned Drexel's fourth-seeded Matthew Cimato in 3:48 in the quarterfinal to secure his first All-American honor.

A few weeks prior, Alec took third at the B1G conference championship with a 4–1 record, avenging an earlier season loss to former NCAA national champion Jason Tsirtsis with an 8–4 decision in the third-place bout. He also earned third place at the Cliff Keen Las Vegas Invitational (Dec 4–5) with a 7–1 record.

==== 2016-17 ====
Alec redshirted and did not compete in collegiate wrestling.

==== 2017-18 ====
As a junior, Alec achieved All-American honors by placing fifth at the NCAA tournament at 157 lbs. He captured the B1G conference championship with a 3–0 record. At the conference championship, he defeated Ohio State's Micah Jordan with a 3–1 score in the final bout.

Earlier in the season, he went 5–0 to capture the Cliff Keen Las Vegas Invitational title, including a 10–3 win over Micah Jordan in the final and a 9–3 semi-final win over Nebraska's fourth-ranked Tyler Berger.

==== 2018-19 ====
As a fifth-year senior, Alec once again secured All-American honors by placing third at the NCAA championships. He carried a 6–1 record at his final collegiate competition, avenging his only loss of the tournament to North Carolina State's Hayden Hidlay. Pantaleo lost to Hidlay in the quarterfinals in overtime, but beat him in the third-place bout with a 5-3 decision.

Alec took third at the Big Ten conference championship with a notable 10–4 win over Northwestern's third-ranked Ryan Deakin in the medal match. Alec missed much of his senior season due to a serious case of mononucleosis.

== Freestyle career ==
Alec has garnered many levels of success in freestyle following his first appearance to the international circuit in 2015. Since then, Alec has finished top-eight at every United States Freestyle national-championships and represented the United States overseas in numerous notable sporting events.

=== 2015 ===
Alec finished with runner up honors at the Junior National Championships in Las Vegas, Nevada. Pantaleo fell to Wyoming's Archie Colgan in the championship bout.

=== 2016 ===
Alec won the Junior National Championships at 66 kg, beating Princeton's Matthew Kolodzik in the first place-bout. In the weeks following he made the United States Junior World team at 66 kg by beating Kolodzik two more times in a best-of-three final bout. Pantaleo went on to represent the United States at the Junior World Championships in Macon, France later that summer. While overseas he posted a 1–1 record, defeating Georgi Sulava from Georgia in the opening round, but eventually falling to Viaks Vikas from India in the following preliminary match. Pantaleo finished with a 10th-place finish at the 2016 Junior World Championships.

=== 2017 ===
Pantaleo placed 5th at the USA Senior National Men's Freestyle Championships at 70 kg in Las Vegas, Nevada

=== 2018 ===
Pantaleo placed 3rd at 70 kg at the 2018 Senior National Men's Freestyle National Championships in Las Vegas, Nevada. He also placed 3rd at the 2018 Senior World Team Trials at 70 kg in Rochester, Minnesota

=== 2019 ===
Alec won the 70 kg U23 National Championships in Akron, Ohio, and was bestowed the Outstanding Wrestler Award by USA wrestling following a remarkably dominant performance. Pantaleo posted a perfect 7–0 record and outscored his opponents by a margin of 69–2. Additionally, he secured his spot as a 2019 U23 World Team Member. Later that year, Pantaleo finished 8th in the world at the U23 World championships in Budapest, Hungary. In the opening round Pantaleo defeated Stefan Tonu of Moldova by a score of 8–0. He then fell to Daud Ibragimov of Azerbaijan by a score of 9–8. Pantaleo finished with a record of 1-1.

Domestically, Pantaleo also placed 4th at the 70 kg 2019 Senior National Men's Freestyle championships in Las Vegas, Nevada at and 8th at 74 kg in Fort Worth, Texas

=== 2020 ===
Pantaleo won gold at the Cerro Pelado International in Havana, Cuba with a perfect 5–0 record while representing the United States at 70 kg. In the finals Pantaleo beat former United States national champion/ world team member Reece Humphrey by a score of 7–2.

=== 2021 ===
Pantaleo earned a 3rd-place finish at the inaugural Flowrestling 150 lb 8-man bracket challenge in Austin, Texas. Pantaleo went 2–1 en route to a bronze medal, beating former NCAA national champions Jordan Oliver and Anthony Ashnault. Pantaleo fell to James Green by a score of 4–2 in the semi-finals.

Pantaleo claimed the 70 kg title at the Matteo Pellicone International in Rome, Italy in April 2021. Pantaleo beat 2019 world-finalist Daulet Niyazbekov of Kazakhstan in the opening round and gold medal match with respective scores of 6-2 and 4–0.

Domestically, Alec took 2nd at the 2021 U.S. Senior National Championships while competing at 70 kg. Pantaleo fell to James Green in the gold medal bout by a score of 2–7.

In June 2021, Alec Pantaleo won gold at the 2021 Pan American Wrestling Championships in Guatemala City, Guatemala. Pantaleo won all three of his matches by technical superiority, beating Carlos Romero Millaqueo from Chile with a score of 12–0 in the gold medal bout.

Pantaleo also claimed the 2021 Poland Open championship in Warsaw, Poland. Pantaleo defeated James Green in the final bout by a score of 5–3. In his semi-final bout, Pantaleo defeated three-time world champion and Olympic Bronze Medalist Haji Aliyev of Azerbaijan with a score of 6-6.

Pantaleo closed out his 2021 campaign with a medical withdrawal from the 2021 United States World Team Trials (wrestling). In his semi finals bout it is recorded that he sustained a rib related injury, causing for a medical forfeit. At that time of injury, Pantaleo was the top ranked wrestler in the world at 70 kg, according to United World Wrestling.

== Freestyle record ==
Senior Freestyle Matches
Res.	Record	Opponent	Score	Date	Event	Location
2026 Henri Deglane Grand Prix (bronze) at 70 kg
Win	97-37	(Moldova) Ionut Triboi	TF 10-0	January 10, 2026	2026 Henri Deglane Grand Prix	Nice, France
Win	96-37	(Moldova) Vasile Diacon	6-8	January 10, 2026	2026 Henri Deglane Grand Prix	Nice, France
Win	96-36	(Belgium) Muhammad Abdurachmanov	TF 10-0	January 10, 2026	2026 Henri Deglane Grand Prix	Nice, France
2025 US Open DNP at 70 kg
Loss	95-36	(United States) Jackson Arrington	2-3	April 23, 2025	2025 US Open	(United States) Las Vegas, Nevada
Loss	95-35	(United States) Bryce Andonian	4-4	April 23, 2025	2025 US Open	(United States) Las Vegas, Nevada
Win	95-34	(United States) Jaivon Jones	3-0	April 23, 2025	2025 US Open	(United States) Las Vegas, Nevada
Win	94-34	(United States) Deondre Wilson	TF 10-0	April 23, 2025	2025 US Open	(United States) Las Vegas, Nevada
2025 Zagreb Grand Prix DNP at 70 kg
Loss	93-34	(United States) James Green	3-4	February 5, 2025	2025 Zagreb Grand Prix	Zagreb, Croatia
2024 World Team Trials (silver) at 70 kg
Loss	93-33	(United States) James Green	1-2	September 14, 2024	2024 World Team Trials – 70 kg	(United States) Omaha, Nebraska
Loss	93-32	(United States) James Green	TF 0-10	September 14, 2024	2024 World Team Trials – 70 kg	(United States) Omaha, Nebraska
Win	93-31	(United States) PJ Duke	7-0	September 14, 2024	2024 World Team Trials – 70 kg	(United States) Omaha, Nebraska
Win	92-31	(United States) Yahya Thomas	2-0	September 14, 2024	2024 World Team Trials – 70 kg	(United States) Omaha, Nebraska
Win	91-31	(United States) Dayne Morton	3-3	September 14, 2024	2024 World Team Trials – 70 kg	(United States) Omaha, Nebraska
2024 US Olympic Team Trials DNP at 65 kg
Loss		(United States) Matthew Kolodzik	FF	April 19, 2024	2024 US Olympic Team Trials – 65 kg	(United States) State College, Pennsylvania
Loss	90-31	(United States) Nick Lee	2-9	April 19, 2024	2024 US Olympic Team Trials – 65 kg	(United States) State College, Pennsylvania
Win	90-30	(United States) Seth Gross	5-3	April 19, 2024	2024 US Olympic Team Trials – 65 kg	(United States) State College, Pennsylvania
2024 Pan American Championships (gold) at 70 kg
Win		(Canada) Peiman Biabani	FF	February 21, 2024	2024 Pan American Championships	Acapulco, Mexico
Win	89-30	(Argentina) Lovera Mauricio Alejandro	TF 11-0	February 21, 2024	2024 Pan American Championships	Acapulco, Mexico
Win	88-30	(Mexico) Erick Barron	TF 10-0	February 21, 2024	2024 Pan American Championships	Acapulco, Mexico
Win	87-30	(Puerto Rico) Victor Soto	TF 10-0	February 21, 2024	2024 Pan American Championships	Acapulco, Mexico
2023 US Senior Nationals 6th at 65 kg
Loss	86-30	(United States) Austin DeSanto	6-9	December 15, 2023	2023 US Senior Nationals	(United States) Fort Worth, Texas
Loss	86-29	(United States) Seth Gross	TF 6-16	December 15, 2023	2023 US Senior Nationals	(United States) Fort Worth, Texas
Loss	86-28	(United States) Andrew Alirez	3-4	December 15, 2023	2023 US Senior Nationals	(United States) Fort Worth, Texas
Win	86-27	(United States) Aden Valencia	3-0	December 15, 2023	2023 US Senior Nationals	(United States) Fort Worth, Texas
Win	85-27	(United States) Christian Monserrat	7-0	December 15, 2023	2023 US Senior Nationals	(United States) Fort Worth, Texas
Loss	84-27	(United States) Sammy Sasso	TF 0-10	June 10, 2023	2023 Final X Newark – True Third Matches – 70 kg	(United States) Newark, New Jersey
2023 US Open (bronze) at 70 kg
Win	84-26	(United States) Jarrett Jacques	4-2	April 26, 2023	2023 US Open	(United States) Las Vegas, Nevada
Win	83-26	(United States) Hayden Hidlay	Fall	April 26, 2023	2023 US Open	(United States) Las Vegas, Nevada
Win		(United States) Joshua Reyes	FF	April 26, 2023	2023 US Open	(United States) Las Vegas, Nevada
Win	82-26	(United States) Ed Scott	TF 10-0	April 26, 2023	2023 US Open	(United States) Las Vegas, Nevada
Win	81-26	(United States) Ty Raines	9-4	April 26, 2023	2023 US Open	(United States) Las Vegas, Nevada
Win	80-26	(United States) Caleb Henson	TF 10-0	April 26, 2023	2023 US Open	(United States) Las Vegas, Nevada
Win	79-26	(United States) Christopher Vaughan	TF 10-0	April 26, 2023	2023 US Open	(United States) Las Vegas, Nevada
Win	78-26	(United States) Jason Hill	TF 10-0	April 26, 2023	2023 US Open	(United States) Las Vegas, Nevada
Loss	77-26	(United States) Jacob Butler	Fall	April 26, 2023	2023 US Open	(United States) Las Vegas, Nevada
2023 Zagreb Open (gold) at 70 kg
Win	77-25	(Azerbaijan) Haji Aliyev	5–2	February 1, 2023	2023 Zagreb Open	Zagreb, Croatia
Win	76-25	(Azerbaijan) Khadzhimurad Gadzhiyev	5–3	February 1, 2023	2023 Zagreb Open	Zagreb, Croatia
Win	75-25	(China) Agudamu	TF 10–0	February 1, 2023	2023 Zagreb Open	Zagreb, Croatia
Win	74-25	(India) Vishal Kaliramana	TF 10–0	February 1, 2023	2023 Zagreb Open	Zagreb, Croatia
2023 Henri Deglane Grand Prix (gold) at 70 kg
Win	73-25	(Georgia (country)) Giorgi Tcholadze	TF 12–1	January 20, 2023	2023 Henri Deglane Grand Prix	Nice, France
Win	72-25	(Germany) Leon Gerstenberger	TF 10–0	January 20, 2023	2023 Henri Deglane Grand Prix	Nice, France
Win	71-25	(Republic of the Congo) Arnaud Mambou	TF 10–0	January 20, 2023	2023 Henri Deglane Grand Prix	Nice, France
Win	70-25	(Iran) Amir Mohammad Yazdani	4–3	December 10, 2022	2022 Wrestling World Cup – 70 kg	(United States) Coralville, Iowa
Win	69-25	(Georgia (country)) Giorgi Elbakidze	8–0	December 10, 2022	2022 Wrestling World Cup – 70 kg	(United States) Coralville, Iowa
2022 Poland Open (silver) at 74 kg
Loss	68-25	(Armenia) Arman Andreasyan	3–2	July 20, 2022	2022 Poland Open	Warsaw, Poland
Win	68-24	(Ukraine) Oleksiy Boruta	6–2	July 20, 2022	2022 Poland Open	Warsaw, Poland
Win	67-24	(Georgia (country)) Zurabi Iakobishvili	2–1	July 20, 2022	2022 Poland Open	Warsaw, Poland
2022 US World Team Trials DNP at 70 kg
Loss	66–24	(United States) Sammy Sasso	6–12	May 21–22, 2022	2022 US World Team Trials Challenge Tournament	(United States) Coralville, Iowa
Loss	66–23	(United States) Zain Retherford	2–5	May 21–22, 2022	2022 US World Team Trials Challenge Tournament	(United States) Coralville, Iowa
Win	66–22	(United States) Tyler Berger	3–2	May 21–22, 2022	2022 US World Team Trials Challenge Tournament	(United States) Coralville, Iowa
2022 US Open (gold) at 70 kg
Win	65–22	(United States) Jordan Oliver	4–2	April 27 – May 1, 2022	2022 US Open National Championships	(United States) Las Vegas, Nevada
Win	64–22	(United States) Doug Zapf	3–2	April 27 – May 1, 2022	2022 US Open National Championships	(United States) Las Vegas, Nevada
Win	63–22	(United States) Ed Scott	8–1	April 27 – May 1, 2022	2022 US Open National Championships	(United States) Las Vegas, Nevada
Win	62–22	(United States) Riley Gurr	TF 14–4	April 27 – May 1, 2022	2022 US Open National Championships	(United States) Las Vegas, Nevada
Win	61–22	(United States) Luka Wick	18–10	April 27 – May 1, 2022	2022 US Open National Championships	(United States) Las Vegas, Nevada
Win	60–22	(United States) Jordan Oliver	4–1	March 16, 2022	Rudis+: Snyder vs. Cox	(United States) Detroit, Michigan
2022 Ivan Yarygin Golden Grand Prix DNP at 70 kg
Loss	59–22	(Russia) Alan Kudzoev	4–4	January 27, 2022	Golden Grand Prix Ivan Yarygin 2022	Krasnoyarsk, Russia
2021 US World Team Trials DNP at 70 kg
		(United States) Zain Retherford	FF	September 11–12, 2021	2021 US World Team Trials	(United States) Lincoln, Nebraska
Loss	59–21	(United States) Ryan Deakin	INJ (4–10)	September 11–12, 2021	2021 US World Team Trials	(United States) Lincoln, Nebraska
Win	59–20	(United States) Brayton Lee	9–0	September 11–12, 2021	2021 US World Team Trials	(United States) Lincoln, Nebraska
2021 Poland Open (gold) at 70 kg
Win	58–20	(United States) James Green	5–3	June 8, 2021	2021 Poland Open	Warsaw, Poland
Win	57–20	(Azerbaijan) Haji Aliyev	6–6	June 8, 2021	2021 Poland Open	Warsaw, Poland
Loss	56–20	(United States) James Green	0–8	June 8, 2021	2021 Poland Open	Warsaw, Poland
Win	56–19	(Ukraine) Oleksii Boruta	TF 10–0	June 8, 2021	2021 Poland Open	Warsaw, Poland
2021 Pan American Championships (gold) at 70 kg
Win	55–19	(Chile) Carlos Romero Millaqueo	TF 12–0	May 30, 2021	2021 Pan American Continental Championships	Guatemala City, Guatemala
Win	54–19	(Canada) Vincent De Marinis	TF 11–0	May 30, 2021	2021 Pan American Continental Championships	Guatemala City, Guatemala
Win	53–19	(Brazil) João Victor dos Santos Silva	TF 10–0	May 30, 2021	2021 Pan American Continental Championships	Guatemala City, Guatemala
2021 US Open (silver) at 70 kg
Loss	52–19	(United States) James Green	2–7	May 1–2, 2021	2021 US Open National Championships	(United States) Coralville, Iowa
Win	52–18	(United States) Tyler Berger	6–2	May 1–2, 2021	2021 US Open National Championships	(United States) Coralville, Iowa
Win	51–18	(United States) Parker Kropman	TF 10–0	May 1–2, 2021	2021 US Open National Championships	(United States) Coralville, Iowa
Win	50–18	(United States) Ryan Ojeda	TF 12–2	May 1–2, 2021	2021 US Open National Championships	(United States) Coralville, Iowa
Win	49–18	(United States) Zachary Wigzell	TF 10–0	May 1–2, 2021	2021 US Open National Championships	(United States) Coralville, Iowa
2020 US Last Chance OTT DNP at 74 kg
Loss	48–18	(United States) Tyler Berger	6–6	March 27, 2021	2020 US Last Chance Olympic Team Trials Qualifier	(United States) Fort Worth, Texas
Loss	48–17	(United States) Chance Marsteller	0–7	March 27, 2021	2020 US Last Chance Olympic Team Trials Qualifier	(United States) Fort Worth, Texas
Win	48–16	(United States) Joshua Shields	7–5	March 27, 2021	2020 US Last Chance Olympic Team Trials Qualifier	(United States) Fort Worth, Texas
Win	47–16	(United States) Carlos Cuevas	TF 10–0	March 27, 2021	2020 US Last Chance Olympic Team Trials Qualifier	(United States) Fort Worth, Texas
Win	46–16	(United States) Ryan Ojeda	TF 10–0	March 27, 2021	2020 US Last Chance Olympic Team Trials Qualifier	(United States) Fort Worth, Texas
Win	45–16	(United States) Sammy Cokeley	TF 10–0	March 27, 2021	2020 US Last Chance Olympic Team Trials Qualifier	(United States) Fort Worth, Texas
2021 Matteo Pellicone Ranking Series (gold) at 70 kg
Win	44–16	(Kazakhstan) Daulet Niyazbekov	4–0	March 6, 2021	Matteo Pellicone Ranking Series 2021	Rome, Italy
Win	43–16	(India) Vishal Kaliraman	TF 10–0	March 6, 2021	Matteo Pellicone Ranking Series 2021	Rome, Italy
Win	42–16	(Turkey) Mustafa Kaya	FF	March 6, 2021	Matteo Pellicone Ranking Series 2021	Rome, Italy
Win	41–16	(Kazakhstan) Daulet Niyazbekov	6–2	March 6, 2021	Matteo Pellicone Ranking Series 2021	Rome, Italy
Flo 8-Man Challenge (bronze) at 150 lbs
Win	40–16	(United States) Anthony Ashnault	8–1	December 18, 2020	Flo 8-Man Challenge: 150 lbs	(United States) Austin, Texas
Loss	39–16	(United States) James Green	2–4	December 18, 2020	Flo 8-Man Challenge: 150 lbs	(United States) Austin, Texas
Win	39–15	(United States) Jordan Oliver	4–4	December 18, 2020	Flo 8-Man Challenge: 150 lbs	(United States) Austin, Texas
FloWrestling RTC Cup (gold) at 65 kg as CKWC
Win	38–15	(United States) Matthew Kolodzik	8–6	December 4–5, 2020	FloWrestling RTC Cup	(United States) Austin, Texas
Win	37–15	(United States) Tariq Wilson	TF 10–0	December 4–5, 2020	FloWrestling RTC Cup	(United States) Austin, Texas
Win	36–15	(United States) Kevin Jack	7–2	December 4–5, 2020	FloWrestling RTC Cup	(United States) Austin, Texas
Win	35–15	(United States) Brayton Lee	TF 10–0	December 4–5, 2020	FloWrestling RTC Cup	(United States) Austin, Texas
Loss	34–15	(United States) Zain Retherford	2–3	September 19, 2020	NLWC I	(United States) State College, Pennsylvania
2020 Cerro Pelado International (gold) at 70 kg
Win	34–14	(United States) Reece Humphrey	FF	February 9–17, 2020	2020 Cerro Pelado International	Havana, Cuba
Win	33–14	(Cuba) Orislandy Perdomo	9–1	February 9–17, 2020	2020 Cerro Pelado International	Havana, Cuba
Win	32–14	(Dominican Republic) Albaro Camacho	4–1	February 9–17, 2020	2020 Cerro Pelado International	Havana, Cuba
Win	31–14	(Cuba) Julio Cesar Cruz	4–2	February 9–17, 2020	2020 Cerro Pelado International	Havana, Cuba
Win	30–14	(United States) Reece Humphrey	7–2	February 9–17, 2020	2020 Cerro Pelado International	Havana, Cuba
2019 US Senior Nationals 8th at 74 kg
Loss	29–14	(United States) Joey Lavallee	2–7	December 20–22, 2019	2019 US Senior National Championships	(United States) Las Vegas, Nevada
Loss	29–13	(United States) Anthony Valencia	TF 0–10	December 20–22, 2019	2019 US Senior National Championships	(United States) Las Vegas, Nevada
Win	29–12	(United States) Tyler Berger	10–2	December 20–22, 2019	2019 US Senior National Championships	(United States) Las Vegas, Nevada
Loss	28–12	(United States) Nazar Kulchytskyy	TF 3–14	December 20–22, 2019	2019 US Senior National Championships	(United States) Las Vegas, Nevada
Win	28–11	(United States) Muhammed McBryde	4–2	December 20–22, 2019	2019 US Senior National Championships	(United States) Las Vegas, Nevada
Win	27–11	(United States) Shabaka Johns	TF 11–1	December 20–22, 2019	2019 US Senior National Championships	(United States) Las Vegas, Nevada
2019 U23 World Championships 9th at 70 kg
Loss	26–11	(Azerbaijan) Daud Ibragimov	8–9	October 28 – November 3, 2019	2019 U23 World Championships	Budapest, Hungary
Win	26–10	(Romania) Stefan Tonu	8–0	October 28 – November 3, 2019	2019 U23 World Championships	Budapest, Hungary
2019 US U23 World Team Trials (gold) at 70 kg
Win	25–10	(United States) Jimmy Hoffman	TF 11–0	May 31 – June 2, 2019	2019 US U23 World Team Trials	(United States) Akron, Ohio
Win	24–10	(United States) Jimmy Hoffman	7–1	May 31 – June 2, 2019	2019 US U23 World Team Trials	(United States) Akron, Ohio
Win	23–10	(United States) Mike D'Angelo	TF 11–1	May 31 – June 2, 2019	2019 US U23 World Team Trials	(United States) Akron, Ohio
Win	22–10	(United States) Samuel Krivus	TF 10–0	May 31 – June 2, 2019	2019 US U23 World Team Trials	(United States) Akron, Ohio
Win	21–10	(United States) Justin McCoy	TF 10–0	May 31 – June 2, 2019	2019 US U23 World Team Trials	(United States) Akron, Ohio
Win	20–10	(United States) Kyler Rea	TF 10–0	May 31 – June 2, 2019	2019 US U23 World Team Trials	(United States) Akron, Ohio
Win	19–10	(United States) Bryce Thurston	TF 10–0	May 31 – June 2, 2019	2019 US U23 World Team Trials	(United States) Akron, Ohio
2019 US World Team Trials 4th at 70 kg
Loss	18–10	(United States) Brandon Sorensen	2–5	May 17–19, 2019	2019 US World Team Trials Challenge Tournament	(United States) Rochester, Minnesota
Win	18–9	(United States) Hayden Hidlay	8–3	May 17–19, 2019	2019 US World Team Trials Challenge Tournament	(United States) Rochester, Minnesota
Loss	17–9	(United States) Jason Chamberlain	2–3	May 17–19, 2019	2019 US World Team Trials Challenge Tournament	(United States) Rochester, Minnesota
2019 US Open 4th at 70 kg
Loss	17–8	(United States) Jason Nolf	6–10	April 24–27, 2019	2019 US Open National Championships	(United States) Las Vegas, Nevada
Win	17–7	(United States) Nazar Kulchytskyy	FF	April 24–27, 2019	2019 US Open National Championships	(United States) Las Vegas, Nevada
Loss	16–7	(United States) Ryan Deakin	4–8	April 24–27, 2019	2019 US Open National Championships	(United States) Las Vegas, Nevada
Win	16–6	(United States) Brandon Sorensen	5–3	April 24–27, 2019	2019 US Open National Championships	(United States) Las Vegas, Nevada
Win	15–6	(United States) Jarod Verkleeren	TF 12–0	April 24–27, 2019	2019 US Open National Championships	(United States) Las Vegas, Nevada
Win	14–6	(United States) Chayse Jackson	TF 10–0	April 24–27, 2019	2019 US Open National Championships	(United States) Las Vegas, Nevada
Win	13–6	(United States) Mitch Finesilver	TF 11–1	April 24–27, 2019	2019 US Open National Championships	(United States) Las Vegas, Nevada
2018 US World Team Trials 4th at 70 kg
Win	12–6	(United States) Ryan Deakin	5–0	May 18–20, 2018	2018 US World Team Trials Challenge Tournament	(United States) Rochester, Minnesota
Win	11–6	(United States) Kyle Ruschell	FF	May 18–20, 2018	2018 US World Team Trials Challenge Tournament	(United States) Rochester, Minnesota
Loss	10–6	(United States) Frank Molinaro	0–8	May 18–20, 2018	2018 US World Team Trials Challenge Tournament	(United States) Rochester, Minnesota
Win	10–5	(United States) Griffin Parriott	11–3	May 18–20, 2018	2018 US World Team Trials Challenge Tournament	(United States) Rochester, Minnesota
2018 US Open (bronze) at 70 kg
Win	9–5	(United States) Dylan Ness	8–2	April 24–28, 2018	2018 US Open National Championships	(United States) Las Vegas, Nevada
Win	8–5	(United States) Ryan Deakin	13–5	April 24–28, 2018	2018 US Open National Championships	(United States) Las Vegas, Nevada
Loss	7–5	(United States) Hayden Hidlay	5–7	April 24–28, 2018	2018 US Open National Championships	(United States) Las Vegas, Nevada
Win	7–4	(United States) Dylan Ness	TF 11–1	April 24–28, 2018	2018 US Open National Championships	(United States) Las Vegas, Nevada
Win	6–4	(United States) Mike DePalma	TF 10–0	April 24–28, 2018	2018 US Open National Championships	(United States) Las Vegas, Nevada
Win	5–4	(United States) Kyle Kintz	TF 10–0	April 24–28, 2018	2018 US Open National Championships	(United States) Las Vegas, Nevada
2017 US World Team Trials DNP at 70 kg
Loss	4–4	(United States) Dylan Ness	6–9	June 9–10, 2017	2017 US World Team Trials Challenge Tournament	(United States) Lincoln, Nebraska
Loss	4–3	(United States) Jason Nolf	TF 2–13	June 9–10, 2017	2017 US World Team Trials Challenge Tournament	(United States) Lincoln, Nebraska
2017 US Open 5th at 70 kg
Win	4–2	(United States) Jason Chamberlain	5–1	April 26–29, 2017	2017 US Open National Championships	(United States) Las Vegas, Nevada
Loss	3–2	(United States) Steven Pami	9–10	April 26–29, 2017	2017 US Open National Championships	(United States) Las Vegas, Nevada
Loss	3–1	(United States) Nazar Kulchytskyy	TF 0–10	April 26–29, 2017	2017 US Open National Championships	(United States) Las Vegas, Nevada
Win	3–0	(United States) Jason Chamberlain	8–6	April 26–29, 2017	2017 US Open National Championships	(United States) Las Vegas, Nevada
Win	2–0	(United States) Robbie Mathers	8–1	April 26–29, 2017	2017 US Open National Championships	(United States) Las Vegas, Nevada
Win	1–0	(United States) Jason Welch	TF 13–3	April 26–29, 2017	2017 US Open National Championships	(United States) Las Vegas, Nevada
