= Beau Bartlett =

American wrestler (born 2001)

Personal information
- Full name: Beau Reynald Bartlett
- Born: February 26, 2001 (age 25) Oceanside, California, U.S.
- Home town: Tempe, Arizona, U.S.
- Weight: 141 lb (64 kg)

Sport
- Country: United States
- Sport: Wrestling
- Events: Folkstyle; Freestyle
- College team: Penn State
- Club: New York City RTC
- Coached by: Cael Sanderson
Medal record
Representing the United States
Men's freestyle wrestling
Yasar Dogu Tournament
Bronze medal – third place	2026 Antalya	65 kg
Grand Prix
Silver medal – second place	2025 New York City	65 kg
U20 World Championships
Bronze medal – third place	2021 Ufa	65 kg
Men's collegiate wrestling
Representing the Penn State Nittany Lions
NCAA Division I Championships
Silver medal – second place	2024 Kansas City	141 lb
Bronze medal – third place	2023 Tulsa	141 lb
Bronze medal – third place	2025 Philadelphia	141 lb
Big Ten Championships
Silver medal – second place	2024 College Park	141 lb
Bronze medal – third place	2023 Ann Arbor	141 lb
Bronze medal – third place	2025 Evanston	141 lb

Beau Reynald Bartlett (born February 26, 2001) is an American freestyle and folkstyle wrestler who competes internationally at 65 kilograms and collegiately at 141 pounds. In freestyle, he claimed a bronze medal from the 2021 Junior World Championships. He compiled a record of 100-20 for Penn State over 5 seasons from 2020-2021 through 2024-2025 .

== Career ==
=== Early years & high school ===
Bartlett began wrestling at age four under the tutelage of his father an All-American for Hall of Fame coach John Woods at Palomar Junior College in California then continued on at NCAA Division I Fresno State. As a wrestler Andre Bartlett, continued to wrestle under the guidance of two-time Olympic champion Sergei Beloglazov. He also trained in tumbling. In 2014, Bartlett moved from Tempe, Arizona to Kingston, Pennsylvania to attend Wyoming Seminary. There, he became the first four–time prep national champion in the school's history and also claimed titles in the Powerade Tournament and the Walsh Jesuit Ironman.

In 2018, Bartlett won the US Cadet Pan American Team Trials in freestyle and Greco-Roman. He would go on to claim gold in freestyle and silver in Greco-Roman at the 2018 Cadet Pan-Am Championships.

On October 5, 2019, Bartlett competed at Who's Number One, where he defended his #1 spot in the rankings by defeating Ryan Sokol from Simley High School.

=== Pennsylvania State University ===
After his high school junior year concluded, Bartlett committed to Penn State University head coach Cael Sanderson, as the top-ranked 133-pounder and sixth-ranked pound for pound by FloWrestling.

==== 2020–2021 ====
At the start of his freshman season at Penn State, Bartlett competed as the backup to future two-time national champion Nick Lee at 141 pounds, winning five extra matches. On February 14, Bartlett made his debut at 149 pounds, winning an extra match. Five days later, Bartlett made his dual-meet debut, losing a close match against second-ranked and then-undefeated Sammy Sasso from Ohio State. He won his match in the last dual of the season against Maryland and also won another extra match, entering the postseason with a 7–1 record. Bartlett, the 11th seed, went 1–2 at the Big Ten Conference Championships, failing to qualify for the NCAA championships.

Following the college season, Bartlett switched to freestyle and won the 65 kg title at the UWW Junior National Championships. Bartlett would go on to win a bronze medal at the UWW Junior World Championship in August after falling to Ziraddin Bayramov of Azerbaijan in the semifinals.

==== 2021–2022 ====
Bartlett became Penn State's full-time starter at 149 pounds in the 2021-2022 season, compiling an 11-6 record in dual meets and earning the 7th seed at the Big Ten Tournament. There, Bartlett won his first match versus Minnesota's Michael Blockhus before falling to eventual Big Ten champion Austin Gomez of Wisconsin. Bartlett's performance earned him his first appearance in the NCAA Tournament, where he would win a first round match versus Northern Iowa's Colin Realbuto before falling to Ohio State's Sammy Sasso and Northwestern's Yahya Thomas.

==== 2022–2023 ====
Entering 2022-2023, Bartlett bumped down to fill the spot at 141 pounds vacated by the recently graduated Nick Lee. He would have a breakout season at the lower weight, rattling off 14 straight wins to start the season before falling to Iowa's Real Woods at the Bryce Jordan Center dual on January 27. At the NCAA Tournament, Bartlett, a six seed, would go on to defeat third seeded Cole Matthews of Pitt with a last-second takedown, before falling to eventual NCAA champion Andrew Alirez of Northern Colorado in the semifinal. He proceeded to capture the third place medal by defeating North Carolina's Lachlan McNeil.

==== 2023–2024 ====
Now a senior, Bartlett began the 2023-2024 season ranked as the number-two wrestler at 141 pounds by FloWrestling, behind only Iowa's Real Woods. In December, Bartlett competed at the 2023 Senior Nationals in freestyle, finishing second to Andrew Alirez at 65 kg and qualifying for the 2024 U.S. Olympic Trials.

Bartlett went undefeated in the regular season, including victories over Woods and Ohio State's Jesse Mendez. Bartlett entered the Big Ten Tournament as the top seed at 141 pounds, but was defeated in sudden victory in a finals rematch with Mendez. At the NCAA Tournament, Bartlett won his first four matches to reach the final, but again lost to Mendez on a last-second takedown.

==== 2024–2025 ====
Using his last year of NCAA eligibility, Bartlett began his final season now ranked number-three wrestler at 141 pounds, behind Northern Colorado's Andrew Alirez and last year's NCAA champion at 141 pounds, Ohio State's Jesse Mendez. Beginning the season with a first place finish at the Black Knight Invitational tournament, Bartlett remained undefeated in regular season duels as well.

Bartlett's only loss prior to the NCAA Tournament was to number-eight University of Minnesota's Vance Vombaur at the semi-finals of the Big Ten Tournament. He lost the match 5-3 but wrestled in the consolation bracket for third place, over Ohio State's Jesse Mendez- his second win over Mendez in the season.

Entering the NCAA Tournament, Bartlett was seeded second, with many considering him to be the favorite to win the national title at 141 pounds. He fell to Mendez in the semifinal bout, a 2-1 match that went into overtime. He took 3rd place over UPenn's CJ Composto, ending his collegiate career with the Nittany Lions with a 100-20 record.

== NCAA record ==
=== Stats ===
Season	Year	School	Rank	Weigh Class	Record	Win	Bonus
2021	Freshman	Penn State University	#22	149	8–3	72.73%	27.27%
2022	Sophomore	Penn State University	#18	149	15-10	70.00%	20.00%
2023	Junior	Penn State University	#3	141	27-3	90.00%	33.33%
2024	Senior	Penn State University	#2	141	24-2	92.31%	38.46%
2025	Senior+	Penn State University	#2	141	26-2	92.85%	39.29 %
Career					100-20	83.33%	32.50%

== Freestyle record ==
Senior Freestyle Matches
Res.	Record	Opponent	Score	Date	Event	Location
2026 US Open (bronze) at 65 kg
Win	25-19	(United States) David Evans	12-3	April 25, 2026	2025 US Open	(United States) Las Vegas, Nevada
Win	24-19	(United States) Pierson Manville	4-3	April 25, 2026	2025 US Open	(United States) Las Vegas, Nevada
Loss	23-19	(United States) Bo Bassett	TF 0-10	April 25, 2026	2025 US Open	(United States) Las Vegas, Nevada
Win	23-18	(United States) Vito Arujau	16-10	April 25, 2026	2025 US Open	(United States) Las Vegas, Nevada
Win	22-18	(United States) Nate Desmond	TF 11-0	April 25, 2026	2025 US Open	(United States) Las Vegas, Nevada
Win	21-18	(United States) Nicc Wells	Fall	April 25, 2026	2025 US Open	(United States) Las Vegas, Nevada
Loss	20-18	(United States) Jordan Oliver	3-5	February 28, 2026	RAF 06	(United States) Tempe, Arizona
2026 Yaşar Doğu Tournament (bronze) at 65 kg
Win	20-17	(Kyrgyzstan) Kursantbek Isakov	6-1	January 9, 2026	2026 Yaşar Doğu Tournament	Antalya, Turkey
Loss	19-17	(Kyrgyzstan) Oskonbai Abdisamatov	10-10	January 9, 2026	2026 Yaşar Doğu Tournament	Antalya, Turkey
Win	19-16	(Turkey) Eren Yalcin	Fall	January 9, 2026	2026 Yaşar Doğu Tournament	Antalya, Turkey
Win	18-16	(Turkey) Ibrahim Kar	TF 10-0	January 9, 2026	2026 Yaşar Doğu Tournament	Antalya, Turkey
2025 Bill Farrell Memorial (silver) at 65 kg
Loss	17-16	(United States) Bo Bassett	TF 5-15	November 9, 2025	2025 Bill Farrell Memorial	(United States) New York City, New York
Win	17-15	(United States) Cael Happel	TF 11-0	November 9, 2025	2025 Bill Farrell Memorial	(United States) New York City, New York
Win	16-15	(Ecuador) Josh Kramer	TF 12-2	November 9, 2025	2025 Bill Farrell Memorial	(United States) New York City, New York
2025 US World Team Trials DNP at 86 kg
Loss	15-15	(United States) Carter Young	TF 0-10	May 16–17, 2025	2025 US World Team Trials Challenge	(United States) Louisville, Kentucky
Loss	15-14	(United States) Bo Bassett	0-1	May 16–17, 2025	2025 US World Team Trials Challenge	(United States) Louisville, Kentucky
2025 US Open 5th at 65 kg
Win	15-13	(United States) Carter Young	7-1	April 23, 2025	2025 US Open	(United States) Las Vegas, Nevada
Loss	14-13	(United States) Real Woods	8-9	April 23, 2025	2025 US Open	(United States) Las Vegas, Nevada
Loss	14-12	(United States) Jesse Mendez	4-2	April 23, 2025	2025 US Open	(United States) Las Vegas, Nevada
Win	14-11	(United States) Carter Young	5-3	April 23, 2025	2025 US Open	(United States) Las Vegas, Nevada
Win	13-11	(United States) Theodore Cha	TF 10-0	April 23, 2025	2025 US Open	(United States) Las Vegas, Nevada
2024 US Olympic Trials DNP 65 kg
Loss	12-11	(United States) Joey McKenna	2-3	April 19, 2024	2024 US Olympic Trials	(United States) State College, Pennsylvania
Loss	12-10	(United States) Andrew Alirez	2-6	April 19, 2024	2024 US Olympic Trials	(United States) State College, Pennsylvania
Win	12-9	(United States) Nahshon Garrett	10-6	April 19, 2024	2024 US Olympic Trials	(United States) State College, Pennsylvania
2023 US Senior Nationals (silver) at 65 kg
Loss	11-9	(United States) Andrew Alirez	0-8	December 15, 2023	2023 US Senior Nationals	(United States) Fort Worth, Texas
Win	11-8	(United States) Joey McKenna	5-5	December 15, 2023	2023 US Senior Nationals	(United States) Fort Worth, Texas
Win	10-8	(United States) Matthew Kolodzik	5-5	December 15, 2023	2023 US Senior Nationals	(United States) Fort Worth, Texas
Win	9-8	(United States) Luke Pletcher	TF 12-1	December 15, 2023	2023 US Senior Nationals	(United States) Fort Worth, Texas
2023 US Open 4th at 65 kg
Loss	8-8	(United States) Matthew Kolodzik	8-6	April 26, 2023	2023 US Open	(United States) Las Vegas, Nevada
Win	8-7	(United States) Anthony Ashnault	8-2	April 26, 2023	2023 US Open	(United States) Las Vegas, Nevada
Loss	7-7	(United States) Nick Lee	10-10	April 26, 2023	2023 US Open	(United States) Las Vegas, Nevada
Win	7-6	(United States) Evan Henderson	11-6	April 26, 2023	2023 US Open	(United States) Las Vegas, Nevada
Win	6-6	(United States) Ian Parker	5-3	April 26, 2023	2023 US Open	(United States) Las Vegas, Nevada
Win	5-6	(United States) Trenton Donahue	TF 10-0	April 26, 2023	2023 US Open	(United States) Las Vegas, Nevada
2022 World Team Trials DNP 65 kg
Loss	4-6	(United States) Kendric Maple	8-6	May 21, 2022	2022 World Team Trials	(United States) Coralville, Iowa
Win	4-5	(United States) Matthew Kolodzik	TF 15-5	May 21, 2022	2022 World Team Trials	(United States) Coralville, Iowa
Loss	3-5	(United States) Ian Parker	5-5	May 21, 2022	2022 World Team Trials	(United States) Coralville, Iowa
2020 NLWC II – 65 kg
Loss	3-4	(United States) Bryce Meredith	6-8	October 20, 2020	2020 NLWC II	(United States) State College, Pennsylvania
2019 US Open 8th at 61 kg
Loss	3-3	(United States) Earl Hall	6-8	April 23, 2019	2019 US Open	(United States) Las Vegas, Nevada
Loss	3-2	(United States) Tony Ramos	TF 0-10	April 23, 2019	2019 US Open	(United States) Las Vegas, Nevada
Win	3-1	(United States) Shelton Mack	8-5	April 23, 2019	2019 US Open	(United States) Las Vegas, Nevada
Win	2-1	(United States) Austin Assad	13-9	April 23, 2019	2019 US Open	(United States) Las Vegas, Nevada
Win	1-1	(United States) Jordan Conaway	Fall	April 23, 2019	2019 US Open	(United States) Las Vegas, Nevada
Loss	0-1	(United States) Cody Brewer	TF 1-11	April 23, 2019	2019 US Open	(United States) Las Vegas, Nevada
