= Jason Nolf =

American wrestler (born 1996)

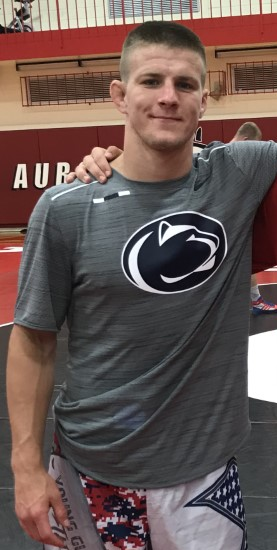
- Nolf in 2019

Personal information
- Full name: Jason Michael Nolf
- Born: January 10, 1996 (age 30) Yatesboro, Pennsylvania, U.S.
- Height: 5 ft 9 in (175 cm)
- Weight: 74 kg (163 lb)
- Website: jasonnolf.com

Sport
- Country: United States
- Sport: Wrestling
- Events: Freestyle and Folkstyle
- College team: Penn State
- Club: Nittany Lion Wrestling Club
- Coached by: Cael Sanderson
Medal record
Men's freestyle wrestling
Representing the United States
World Cup
Gold medal – first place	2022 Coralville	Team
Grand Prix
Gold medal – first place	2023 Zagreb	74 kg
Gold medal – first place	2024 Zagreb	74 kg
Silver medal – second place	2022 Krasnoyarsk	74 kg
Pan American Championships
Gold medal – first place	2020 Ottawa	79 kg
US National Championships
Gold medal – first place	2022 Las Vegas	74 kg
Gold medal – first place	2023 Las Vegas	74 kg
Bronze medal – third place	2019 Las Vegas	70 kg
Men's collegiate wrestling
Representing the Penn State Nittany Lions
NCAA Division I Championships
Gold medal – first place	2017 St. Louis	157 lb
Gold medal – first place	2018 Cleveland	157 lb
Gold medal – first place	2019 Pittsburgh	157 lb
Silver medal – second place	2016 New York	157 lb
Big Ten Championships
Gold medal – first place	2017 Bloomington	157 lb
Gold medal – first place	2019 Minneapolis	157 lb
Silver medal – second place	2016 Iowa City	157 lb

Jason Michael Nolf (born January 10, 1996) is an American freestyle wrestler and a former folkstyle wrestler who competes at 74 kilograms. In freestyle, he is a two-time U.S. national champion and a multiple-time medalist in international tournaments.

In folkstyle, Nolf was a three-time NCAA Division I national champion (finalist in 2016) and a two-time Big Ten Conference champion out of Pennsylvania State University.

== Career ==
=== High school ===
Nolf attended Kittanning High School, where he became a three-time PIAA Class AA state champion with a 176–1 record. He also competed in cross country and track and field, and graduated with a 4.5 GPA. In 2022, he was inducted into the WPIAL Hall of Fame.

=== College ===
A three-time state champion, Nolf committed to wrestle at Pennsylvania State University in 2013.

==== 2014–2015 ====
During his redshirt campaign, Nolf claimed titles at the East Stroudsburg and Nittany Lion Open tournaments and made a finals run at the Southern Scuffle, ending the season with a 15–1 record at 157 pounds.

==== 2015–2016 ====
As a redshirt freshman, Nolf claimed the Southern Scuffle and Nittany Lion Open titles and went undefeated in duals, before placing second to Isaiah Martinez from Illinois at the Big Ten Championship. At the NCAA national tournament, Nolf reached the finals, where he suffered a close loss to Martinez and finished second. He was named Freshman of the Year by Intermat and compiled a 33–2 record.

After his runner-up finish at the NCAA championships, Nolf placed second at the US U20 World Team Trials in freestyle.

==== 2016–2017 ====
As a sophomore, Nolf claimed the Keystone Classic title and was undefeated in dual action during regular season. After becoming the Big Ten champion, Nolf claimed his first NCAA title with bonus-points in every match at the national tournament, helping the Nittany Lions reach their second straight title. He finished second as the NCAA Outstanding Wrestler behind teammate Zain Retherford, and posted an undefeated record of 27–0.

Fresh as an NCAA champion, Nolf switched to freestyle, placing fourth at the US Open and third at the US World Team Trials.

==== 2017–2018 ====
As a junior, Nolf claimed the Southern Scuffle and Keystone Classic titles, pinning his way through both tournaments, and the only loss he suffered during regular season was an injury default. After reaching the quarterfinals of the Big Ten Championships, he was forced to medical forfeit out in the semis. Nolf then claimed another NCAA title to become a two-time National champion and help Penn State with their third straight title. He closed out the season with a 26–2 record.

==== 2018–2019 ====
As a senior, he repeated as a Southern Scuffle and Keystone Classic champion, and once again was unbeaten during regular season. After becoming a two-time Big Ten Conference champion, Nolf scored bonus-points in every match en route to dominantly claiming his third straight NCAA title, as well as helping Penn State win its fourth championship in a row. He finished the season with a perfect 31–0 record.

Nolf graduated as a three-time NCAA Division I National champion and two-time Big Ten Conference champion with a record of 133–4. In June 2019, Nolf was awarded the prestigious Big Ten Medal of Honor along with Ally McHugh.

Fresh off his accomplished college career, Nolf joined the Nittany Lion Wrestling Club and switched his focus to freestyle full-time. Between April and May, Nolf placed third at the US Open at 70 kilograms and at the US World Team Trials up at 74 kilograms. To close off the year, he earned a silver medal from the Bill Farrell Memorial.

==== 2020 ====
To start off the year, Nolf earned a gold medal from the Pan American Championships up at 79 kilograms, qualifying for the US Olympic Team Trials. He was scheduled to compete at the event in April, however, the event was postponed for 2021 due to the COVID-19 pandemic.

Nolf then competed in three matches in different events, earning wins over US National champion Jordan Oliver, three-time All-American David McFadden, and 2007 U20 World champion turned MMA fighter Bubba Jenkins.

==== 2021 ====
To prepare for the trials, Nolf competed at the NLWC V in February, earning a win over Jevon Balfour before falling to reigning and two-time World Champion Kyle Dake.

In April, down at 74 kilograms for the US Olympic Team Trials, Nolf earned a win over U20 World champion David Carr before losing again to Kyle Dake. In the third-place match, he defeated two-time All-American Evan Wick.

In September, up at 79 kilograms, Nolf placed fourth at the US World Team Trials, notably having a close match with seven-time Olympic and World champion Jordan Burroughs. To close off the year, he defeated World champion Khetag Tsabolov at an event in Kaspiysk on December.

==== 2022 ====
In January, Nolf claimed a silver medal at the Golden Grand Prix Ivan Yarygin, notably pinning returning World medalist Timur Bizhoev before falling to returning U23 World champion Chermen Valiev. After dismantling returning European medalist Mitch Finesilver in February, Nolf claimed the US Open National championship in April.

After dominating the US World Team Trials Challenge tournament field in May, earning another win over NCAA champion David Carr on his way, Nolf was defeated twice by returning Olympic medalist Kyle Dake in the Final X Neward series in June, finishing as a runner-up at the US World Trials.

At the end of the year, Nolf went 1–1 at the World Cup, helping Team USA reach the gold medal.

==== 2023 ====
To start off the year, Nolf grabbed a Zagreb Open Grand Prix title in February, earning notable victories over returning World medalist Younes Emami and returning U20 World champion Dzhabrail Gadzhiev.

Next, he became a two-time US National champion in April with wins over two-time NCAA champions Vincenzo Joseph and Keegan O'Toole, earning a berth for Final X NYC. At the event, Nolf was neutralized twice by now four-time World Champion Kyle Dake, losing the series and placing second at the US World Team Trials.

To finish off the year, Nolf grabbed a Bill Farrell Memorial title in November, dismantling four-time All-American Alex Marinelli after a hard-fought semifinal win over NCAA runner-up Quincy Monday.

==== 2024 ====
In January, Nolf grabbed his second straight title from the Zagreb Open Grand Prix, with dominant wins over returning World medalist Ramazan Ramazanov and European champion Georgios Kougioumtsidis.

In April, Nolf competed at the US Olympic Team Trials, and won the finals of the challenge tournament after wins over Jarrett Jacques and Olympian Gold Medalist, Pan American Champion and 6 Time World Champion Jordan Burroughs. During Saturday's Championship Series, facing Olympian Bronze Medalist and four-time NCAA champion Kyle Dake, Nolf was defeated on points, ending his hopes of a run at the Summer Olympics. Nolf later confirmed that he would retire from the sport of wrestling.

== Professional grappling career ==
Nolf has been known to give wrestling seminars to high-level Brazilian Jiu-Jitsu academies, and has even spent some time training in the sport with Bo Nickal.

Nolf competed in his professional grappling debut against Andrew Simmons at the Paradigm Open 3 on June 9, 2024. He won the match by submission.

Nolf competed in the under 80 kg division of the inaugural Craig Jones Invitational on August 16 and 17, 2024. He was submitted by Tye Ruotolo in the opening round.

Nolf competed against Renato Canuto in the co-main event of UFC Fight Pass Invitational 9 on December 5, 2024. He lost the match by decision.

Nolf represented Williams Elite Team at the AIGA Champions League finals 2025, going 1-1 as Williams Elite Team finished in second place.

== Personal life ==
On June 30, 2018, Nolf married Penn State women's soccer player Maddie Elliston.

== Freestyle record ==
Senior Freestyle Matches
Res.	Record	Opponent	Score	Date	Event	Location
Win	70-20	(United States) Christopher Minto	10–5	May 30, 2026	RAF 09	(United States) Arlington, Texas
Win	69-20	(United States) Joey Blaze	11–2	April 18, 2026	RAF 08	(United States) Philadelphia, Pennsylvania
Win	68-20	David Mistulov	TF 10–0	March 28, 2026	RAF 07	(United States) Tampa, Florida
Win	67-20	(United States) Andy Varela	TF 10–0	December 20, 2025	RAF 04	(United States) Fishers, Indiana
Loss	66–20	(United States) Evan Wick	8–10	August 30, 2025	RAF 01	(United States) Cleveland, Ohio
2024 US Olympic Team Trials (silver) at 74 kg
Loss	66–19	(United States) Kyle Dake	1–3	April 20, 2024	2024 US Olympic Team Trials	(United States) State College, Pennsylvania
Loss	66–18	(United States) Kyle Dake	1–4	April 20, 2024	2024 US Olympic Team Trials	(United States) State College, Pennsylvania
Win	66–17	(United States) Jordan Burroughs	3–0	April 19, 2024	2024 US Olympic Team Trials	(United States) State College, Pennsylvania
Win	65–17	(United States) Jarrett Jacques	9–2	April 19, 2024	2024 US Olympic Team Trials	(United States) State College, Pennsylvania
Win	64–17	(United States) Alex Marinelli	7–2	April 19, 2024	2024 US Olympic Team Trials	(United States) State College, Pennsylvania
2024 Grand Prix Zagreb Open (gold) at 74 kg
Win	63–17	(Iran) Hossein Abouzari	10–1	January 10, 2024	2024 Grand Prix Zagreb Open	Zagreb, Croatia
Win	62–17	(Greece) Georgios Kougioumtsidis	Fall	January 10, 2024	2024 Grand Prix Zagreb Open	Zagreb, Croatia
Win	61–17	(Hungary) Murad Kuramagomedov	7–0	January 10, 2024	2024 Grand Prix Zagreb Open	Zagreb, Croatia
Win	60–17	(Bulgaria) Ramazan Ramazanov	TF 12–2	January 10, 2024	2024 Grand Prix Zagreb Open	Zagreb, Croatia
Win	59–17	(Venezuela) Anthony Montero	TF 11–0	January 10, 2024	2024 Grand Prix Zagreb Open	Zagreb, Croatia
2023 Bill Farrell Memorial (gold) at 74 kg
Win	58–17	(United States) Alex Marinelli	TF 11–0	November 18, 2023	2023 Bill Farrell Memorial International	(United States) New York City, New York
Win	57–17	(United States) Quincy Monday	7–6	November 18, 2023	2023 Bill Farrell Memorial International	(United States) New York City, New York
Win	56–17	(United States) Aaron Matheson	Fall	November 18, 2023	2023 Bill Farrell Memorial International	(United States) New York City, New York
Win	55–17	(Canada) Connor Quinton	TF 10–0	November 18, 2023	2023 Bill Farrell Memorial International	(United States) New York City, New York
2023 US World Team Trials (silver) at 74 kg
Loss	54–17	(United States) Kyle Dake	0–3	June 10, 2023	2023 Final X Newark	(United States) Newark, New Jersey
Loss	54–16	(United States) Kyle Dake	0–6	June 10, 2023	2023 Final X Newark	(United States) Newark, New Jersey
2023 US Open (gold) at 74 kg
Win	54–15	(United States) Vincenzo Joseph	10–5	April 27–28, 2023	2023 US Open National Championships	(United States) Las Vegas, Nevada
Win	53–15	(United States) Keegan O'Toole	9–2	April 27–28, 2023	2023 US Open National Championships	(United States) Las Vegas, Nevada
Win	52–15	(United States) Julian Ramirez	TF 10–0	April 27–28, 2023	2023 US Open National Championships	(United States) Las Vegas, Nevada
Win	51–15	(United States) Elijah Cleary	TF 10–0	April 27–28, 2023	2023 US Open National Championships	(United States) Las Vegas, Nevada
Win	50–15	(United States) Tyler Wagener	TF 11–0	April 27–28, 2023	2023 US Open National Championships	(United States) Las Vegas, Nevada
2023 Grand Prix Zagreb Open (gold) at 74 kg
Win	49–15	(Iran) Younes Emami	3–3	February 1–5, 2023	2023 Grand Prix Zagreb Open	Zagreb, Croatia
Win	48–15	(Hungary) Murad Kuramagomedov	2–1	February 1–5, 2023	2023 Grand Prix Zagreb Open	Zagreb, Croatia
Win	47–15	(Azerbaijan) Dzhabrail Gadzhiev	5–3	February 1–5, 2023	2023 Grand Prix Zagreb Open	Zagreb, Croatia
Win	46–15	(Canada) Patrik Leder	TF 10–0	February 1–5, 2023	2023 Grand Prix Zagreb Open	Zagreb, Croatia
2022 World Cup (gold) at 74 kg as Team USA
Loss	45–15	(Iran) Mohammad Sadegh Firouzpour	1–2	December 10–11, 2022	2022 World Cup	(United States) Coralville, Iowa
Win	45–14	(Georgia (country)) Giorgi Sulava	TF 10–0	December 10–11, 2022	2022 World Cup	(United States) Coralville, Iowa
2022 US World Team Trials (silver) at 74 kg
Loss	44–14	(United States) Kyle Dake	1–2	June 8, 2022	2022 Final X NYC	(United States) New York City, New York
Loss	44–13	(United States) Kyle Dake	2–4	June 8, 2022	2022 Final X NYC	(United States) New York City, New York
Win	44–12	(United States) Joey Lavallee	TF 14–3	May 21–22, 2022	2022 US World Team Trials Challenge	(United States) Coralville, Iowa
Win	43–12	(United States) Joey Lavallee	TF 12–1	May 21–22, 2022	2022 US World Team Trials Challenge	(United States) Coralville, Iowa
Win	42–12	(United States) David Carr	Fall	May 21–22, 2022	2022 US World Team Trials Challenge	(United States) Coralville, Iowa
2022 US Open (gold) at 74 kg
Win	41–12	(United States) Josh Shields	TF 11–0	April 29–30, 2022	2022 US Open National Championships	(United States) Las Vegas, Nevada
Win	40–12	(United States) Andrew Cerniglia	TF 10–0	April 29–30, 2022	2022 US Open National Championships	(United States) Las Vegas, Nevada
Win	39–12	(United States) Peter Pappas	Fall	April 29–30, 2022	2022 US Open National Championships	(United States) Las Vegas, Nevada
Win	38–12	(United States) Joey Mora	TF 10–0	April 29–30, 2022	2022 US Open National Championships	(United States) Las Vegas, Nevada
Win	37–12	(United States) Michael Seijo	TF 10–0	April 29–30, 2022	2022 US Open National Championships	(United States) Las Vegas, Nevada
Win	36–12	(Israel) Mitch Finesilver	TF 11–0	February 13, 2022	2022 Bout at the Ballpark	(United States) Arlington, Texas
2022 Ivan Yarygin Golden Grand Prix (silver) at 74 kg
Loss	35–12	(Russia) Chermen Valiev	1–6	January 27–30, 2022	Golden Grand Prix Ivan Yarygin 2022	Krasnoyarsk, Russia
Win	35–11	(Russia) Timur Bizhoev	Fall	January 27–30, 2022	Golden Grand Prix Ivan Yarygin 2022	Krasnoyarsk, Russia
Win	34–11	(United States) Josh Shields	9–1	January 27–30, 2022	Golden Grand Prix Ivan Yarygin 2022	Krasnoyarsk, Russia
Win	33–11	(Russia) Magomed Kardanov	TF 12–1	January 27–30, 2022	Golden Grand Prix Ivan Yarygin 2022	Krasnoyarsk, Russia
Win	32–11	(Serbia) Khetag Tsabolov	16–9	December 7, 2021	WOLNIK 7	Kaspiysk, Russia
2021 US World Team Trials 4th at 79 kg
Loss	31–11	(United States) Carter Starocci	3–4	September 11–12, 2021	2021 US World Team Trials	(United States) Lincoln, Nebraska
Win	31–10	(United States) Hayden Hidlay	TF 10–0	September 11–12, 2021	2021 US World Team Trials	(United States) Lincoln, Nebraska
Loss	30–10	(United States) Jordan Burroughs	3–5	September 11–12, 2021	2021 US World Team Trials	(United States) Lincoln, Nebraska
Win	30–9	(United States) Evan Wick	TF 10–0	September 11–12, 2021	2021 US World Team Trials	(United States) Lincoln, Nebraska
Win	29–9	(United States) Joey Lavallee	TF 15–4	September 11–12, 2021	2021 US World Team Trials	(United States) Lincoln, Nebraska
2020 US Olympic Team Trials (bronze) at 74 kg
Win	28–9	(United States) Evan Wick	TF 10–0	April 2–3, 2021	2020 US Olympic Team Trials	(United States) Fort Worth, Texas
Loss	27–9	(United States) Kyle Dake	TF 0–11	April 2–3, 2021	2020 US Olympic Team Trials	(United States) Fort Worth, Texas
Win	27–8	(United States) David Carr	TF 10–0	April 2–3, 2021	2020 US Olympic Team Trials	(United States) Fort Worth, Texas
Loss	26–8	(United States) Kyle Dake	0–5	February 23, 2021	NLWC V	(United States) State College, Pennsylvania
Win	26–7	(Canada) Jevon Balfour	TF 10–0	February 23, 2021	NLWC V	(United States) State College, Pennsylvania
Win	25-7	(United States) Bubba Jenkins	TF 10-0	October 20, 2020	NLWC II	(United States) State College, Pennsylvania
Win	24-7	(United States) David McFadden	5-2	September 19, 2020	NLWC I	(United States) State College, Pennsylvania
Win	23-7	(United States) Jordan Oliver	4-1	June 28, 2020	Rumble on the Rooftop	(United States) Chicago, Illinois
2020 Pan American Championships (gold) at 79 kg
Win	22–7	(Mexico) Victor Eduardo Hernández Luna	Fall	March 9, 2020	2020 Pan American Wrestling Championships	Ottawa, Canada
Win	21–7	(Canada) Guseyn Ruslanzada	TF 10–0	March 9, 2020	2020 Pan American Wrestling Championships	Ottawa, Canada
2019 Bill Farrell Memorial (silver) at 74kg
Loss	20–7	(United States) Isaiah Martinez	TF 0–12	November 16, 2019	2019 Bill Farrell Memorial International Open	New York, New York, United States
Win	20–6	(United States) Vincenzo Joseph	6–0	November 16, 2019	2019 Bill Farrell Memorial International Open	New York, New York, United States
Win	19–6	(United States) Logan Massa	7–0	November 16, 2019	2019 Bill Farrell Memorial International Open	New York, New York, United States
Win	18–6	(United States) Joey Lavallee	TF 10–0	November 16, 2019	2019 Bill Farrell Memorial International Open	New York, New York, United States
Win	17–6	(Egypt) Aly Ibrahim Abdelhamid	TF 11–0	November 16, 2019	2019 Bill Farrell Memorial International Open	New York, New York, United States
2019 US World Team Trials Challenge (silver) at 74 kg
Loss	16–6	(United States) Isaiah Martinez	TF 2–12	May 19, 2019	2019 US World Team Trials Challenge	Raleigh, North Carolina, United States
Win	16–5	(United States) Isaiah Martinez	7–5	May 19, 2019	2019 US World Team Trials Challenge	Raleigh, North Carolina, United States
Loss	15–5	(United States) Isaiah Martinez	4–9	May 19, 2019	2019 US World Team Trials Challenge	Raleigh, North Carolina, United States
Win	15–4	(United States) Logan Massa	7–2	May 19, 2019	2019 US World Team Trials Challenge	Raleigh, North Carolina, United States
Win	14–4	(United States) Anthony Valencia	7–0	May 19, 2019	2019 US World Team Trials Challenge	Raleigh, North Carolina, United States
Win	13–4	(United States) Brian Murphy	TF 12–2	May 19, 2019	2019 US World Team Trials Challenge	Raleigh, North Carolina, United States
2019 US Open (bronze) at 70 kg
Win	12–4	(United States) Alec Pantaleo	10–6	April 27, 2019	2019 U.S. Open Wrestling Championships	Las Vegas, Nevada, United States
Win	11–4	(United States) Brandon Sorensen	3–0	April 27, 2019	2019 U.S. Open Wrestling Championships	Las Vegas, Nevada, United States
Loss	10–4	(United States) James Green	6–6	April 27, 2019	2019 U.S. Open Wrestling Championships	Las Vegas, Nevada, United States
Win	10–3	(United States) Nazar Kulchytskyy	TF 13–2	April 27, 2019	2019 U.S. Open Wrestling Championships	Las Vegas, Nevada, United States
Win	9–3	(United States) Kizhan Clarke	TF 10–0	April 27, 2019	2019 U.S. Open Wrestling Championships	Las Vegas, Nevada, United States
Win	8–3	(United States) Justin Davis	TF 10–0	April 27, 2019	2019 U.S. Open Wrestling Championships	Las Vegas, Nevada, United States
Win	7–3	(United States) Kevin Jack	TF 12–2	April 27, 2019	2019 U.S. Open Wrestling Championships	Las Vegas, Nevada, United States
2017 US World Team Trials (bronze) at 70 kg
Win	6–3	(United States) Nazar Kulchytskyy	7–2	June 10, 2017	2017 US World Team Trials	Lincoln, Nebraska, United States
Loss	5–3	(United States) Jimmy Kennedy	6–8	June 10, 2017	2017 US World Team Trials	Lincoln, Nebraska, United States
Win	5–2	(United States) Alec Pantaleo	TF 13–2	June 10, 2017	2017 US World Team Trials	Lincoln, Nebraska, United States
2017 US Open 4th at 70 kg
Loss	4–2	(United States) Steven Pami	6–12	April 29, 2017	2017 U.S. Open Wrestling Championships	Las Vegas, Nevada, United States
Win	4–1	(United States) Jason Chamberlain	8–0	April 29, 2017	2017 U.S. Open Wrestling Championships	Las Vegas, Nevada, United States
Loss	3–1	(United States) James Green	8–9	April 29, 2017	2017 U.S. Open Wrestling Championships	Las Vegas, Nevada, United States
Win	3–0	(United States) Thomas Gantt	TF 10–0	April 29, 2017	2017 U.S. Open Wrestling Championships	Las Vegas, Nevada, United States
Win	2–0	(United States) Isaac Dukes	TF 15–4	April 29, 2017	2017 U.S. Open Wrestling Championships	Las Vegas, Nevada, United States
Win	1–0	(United States) Markus Scheidel	TF 11–1	April 29, 2017	2017 U.S. Open Wrestling Championships	Las Vegas, Nevada, United States

== NCAA record ==
NCAA Championships Matches
Res.	Record	Opponent	Score	Date	Event
2019 NCAA Championships (gold) at 157 lbs
Win	19–1	Tyler Berger	MD 10–2	March 23, 2019	2019 NCAA Division I Wrestling Championships
Win	18–1	Hayden Hidlay	3–2	March 23, 2019	2019 NCAA Division I Wrestling Championships
Win	17–1	Christian Pagdilao	TF 23–6	March 23, 2019	2019 NCAA Division I Wrestling Championships
Win	16–1	John Van Brill	TF 19–4	March 23, 2019	2019 NCAA Division I Wrestling Championships
Win	15–1	Ben Anderson	Fall	March 23, 2019	2019 NCAA Division I Wrestling Championships
2018 NCAA Championships (gold) at 157 lbs
Win	14–1	Hayden Hidlay	6–2	March 17, 2018	2018 NCAA Division I Wrestling Championships
Win	13–1	Micah Jordan	TF 16–0	March 17, 2018	2018 NCAA Division I Wrestling Championships
Win	12–1	Michael Kemerer	6–2	March 17, 2018	2018 NCAA Division I Wrestling Championships
Win	11–1	Andrew Crone	6–1	March 17, 2018	2018 NCAA Division I Wrestling Championships
Win	10–1	Colin Heffernan	TF 22–7	March 17, 2018	2018 NCAA Division I Wrestling Championships
2017 NCAA Championships (gold) at 157 lbs
Win	9–1	Joey Lavallee	MD 14–6	March 18, 2017	2017 NCAA Division I Wrestling Championships
Win	8–1	Tyler Berger	MD 13–5	March 18, 2017	2017 NCAA Division I Wrestling Championships
Win	7–1	Bryant Clagon	Fall	March 18, 2017	2017 NCAA Division I Wrestling Championships
Win	6–1	Victor Lopez	TF 24–9	March 18, 2017	2017 NCAA Division I Wrestling Championships
Win	5–1	Thomas Bullard	TF 22–7	March 18, 2017	2017 NCAA Division I Wrestling Championships
2016 NCAA Championships (silver) at 157 lbs
Loss	4–1	Isaiah Martinez	5–6	March 17, 2016	2016 NCAA Division I Wrestling Championships
Win	4–0	Chad Walsh	TF 19–4	March 17, 2016	2016 NCAA Division I Wrestling Championships
Win	3–0	Joe Smith	MD 11–3	March 17, 2016	2016 NCAA Division I Wrestling Championships
Win	2–0	May Bethea	TF 25–10	March 17, 2016	2016 NCAA Division I Wrestling Championships
Win	1–0	Kamael Shakur	Fall	March 17, 2016	2016 NCAA Division I Wrestling Championships

=== Stats ===
Season	Year	School	Rank	Weigh Class	Record	Win	Bonus
2019	Senior	Penn State University	#1 (1st)	157	31–0	100.00%	83.87%
2018	Junior	Penn State University	#1 (1st)	157	25–1	96.15%	77.78%
2017	Sophomore	Penn State University	#1 (1st)	157	27–0	100.00%	92.59%
2016	Freshman	Penn State University	#1 (2nd)	157	34–2	94.44%	88.89%
2015	Redshirt	Penn State University	#7	157	16–1	94.12%	88.89%
Career					133–4	97.08%	85.78%
