= 2023 Big Ten Wrestling Championships – 141 lbs =

141 pounds at the 2023 Big Ten Wrestling Championships
- Site: Crisler Center; Ann Arbor, Michigan
- Competitors: 14

Medalists
- 1st place, gold medalist(s): Real Woods (Iowa)
- 2nd place, silver medalist(s): Brock Hardy (Nebraska)
- 3rd place, bronze medalist(s): Beau Bartlett (Penn State)

The 141-pound competition at the 2023 Big Ten Wrestling Championships in Ann Arbor, Michigan, took place from March 4–5, 2023 at the Crisler Center.

The competition consisted of a triple-elimination tournament to determine the top ten wrestlers of the Big Ten's 141-pound weight class. The top nine wrestlers would qualify for the 2023 NCAA Division I Wrestling Championships.

Real Woods of Iowa would win the tournament with a 2–1 decision win in the finals over Brock Hardy of Nebraska.

== Preliminary seeds ==
The Big Ten announced the preliminary seeds on February 27, 2023.

Seed	Wrestler
1	Real Woods (Iowa)
2	Beau Bartlett (Penn State)
3	Brock Hardy (Nebraska)
4	Frankie Tal-Shahar (Northwestern)
5	Jakob Bergeland (Minnesota)
6	Danny Pucino (Illinois)
7	Joe Olivieri (Rutgers)
8	Parker Filius (Purdue)
9	Dylan D'Emilio (Ohio State)
10	Cole Mattin (Michigan)
11	Joseph Zargo (Wisconsin)
12	Jordan Hamdan (Michigan State)
13	Cayden Rooks (Indiana)
14	Kal Miller (Maryland)

== Results ==
Legend

- F — Won by fall
- MF — Won by medical forfeit

=== Championship bracket ===
First Round
1	Real Woods (IOWA)
BYE
9	Dylan D`Emilio (OSU)	1
8	Parker Filius (PUR)	3
5	Jakob Bergeland (MINN)	7
12	Jordan Hamdan (MSU)	5
13	Cayden Rooks (IND)	5
4	Frankie Tal-Shahar (NU)	7
3	Brock Hardy (NEB)	6
14	Kal Miller (MD)	0
11	Joseph Zargo (WIS)	8
6	Danny Pucino (ILL)	4
7	Joe Olivieri (RUT)	3
10	Cole Mattin (MICH)	5
BYE
2	Beau Bartlett (PSU)

Quarterfinals
1	Real Woods (IOWA)	6^{F}
8	Parker Filius (PUR)	0
5	Jakob Bergeland (MINN)	5
4	Frankie Tal-Shahar (NU)	7
3	Brock Hardy (NEB)	12
11	Joseph Zargo (WIS)	0
10	Cole Mattin (MICH)	2
2	Beau Bartlett (PSU)	4

Semifinals
1	Real Woods (IOWA)	3
4	Frankie Tal-Shahar (NU)	0
3	Brock Hardy (NEB)	7
2	Beau Bartlett (PSU)	3

1st-Place Match
1	Real Woods (IOWA)	2
3	Brock Hardy (NEB)	1

=== Consolation bracket ===
Consolation Round 1
BYE
BYE

Consolation Round 2

Consolation Quarterfinals
7th-Place Match

Consolation Semifinals
5th-Place Match

3rd-Place Match

=== 9th-place bracket ===
9th-Place Quarterfinals
6	Danny Pucino (ILL)
BYE
10	Cole Mattin (MICH)	3
14	Kal Miller (MD)	9
13	Cayden Rooks (IND)	10
12	Jordan Hamdan (MSU)	3
BYE
7	Joe Olivieri (RUT)

9th-Place Semifinals
6	Danny Pucino (ILL)	5
14	Kal Miller (MD)	8
13	Cayden Rooks (IND)	1
7	Joe Olivieri (RUT)	2

9th-Place Match
14	Kal Miller (MD)	3
7	Joe Olivieri (RUT)	2

== Final standings ==
Note: Top-9 wrestlers qualify for the 2023 NCAA Division I Wrestling Championships.

Rank	Wrestler
1st place, gold medalist(s)	Real Woods (Iowa)
2nd place, silver medalist(s)	Brock Hardy (Nebraska)
3rd place, bronze medalist(s)	Beau Bartlett (Penn State)
4	Dylan D`Emilio (Ohio State)
5	Parker Filius (Purdue)
6	Frankie Tal-Shahar (Northwestern)
7	Joseph Zargo (Wisconsin)
8	Jakob Bergeland (Minnesota)
9	Kal Miller (Maryland)
10	Joe Olivieri (Rutgers)
