= Nahshon Garrett =

American wrestler (born 1993)

Personal information
- Full name: Nahshon Aaron Garrett
- Born: August 21, 1993 (age 32) Chico, California, U.S.
- Height: 5 ft 5 in (165 cm)
- Weight: 65 kg (143 lb)

Sport
- Country: United States
- Sport: Wrestling
- Event(s): Freestyle and Folkstyle
- College team: Cornell University
- Club: Southeast Region Training Center
- Coached by: Rob Koll; Tony Robie
Medal record
Men's freestyle wrestling
Representing the United States
Pan American Games
Silver medal – second place	2023 Santiago	65 kg
Grand Prix
Gold medal – first place	2025 Nice	61 kg
Bronze medal – third place	2023 Nice	61 kg
Bronze medal – third place	2023 Warsaw	61 kg
Bronze medal – third place	2024 Budapest	61 kg
US Open National Championships
Silver medal – second place	2017 Las Vegas	57 kg
Silver medal – second place	2018 Las Vegas	61 kg
Bronze medal – third place	2023 Las Vegas	61 kg
Men's collegiate wrestling
Representing the Cornell Big Red
NCAA Division I Championships
Gold medal – first place	2016 New York	133 lb
Silver medal – second place	2014 Oklahoma City	125 lb
Bronze medal – third place	2013 Des Moines	125 lb
EIWA Championships
Gold medal – first place	2013 New Brunswick	125 lb
Gold medal – first place	2014 Philadelphia	125 lb
Gold medal – first place	2015 Bethlehem	125 lb
Gold medal – first place	2016 Princeton	133 lb

Nahshon Aaron Garrett (born August 21, 1993) is an American freestyle and graduated folkstyle wrestler, who currently competes at 57 kilograms. In the international style, Garrett was originally the United States representative for the 2018 World Championships at 61 kg as the Final X champion before withdrawing from the tournament due to injury. He is also a two-time US Open runner-up and Dave Schultz Memorial International runner-up. As a folkstyle wrestler, Garrett was the 2016 NCAA Division I national champion (runner-up in 2014), a four-time NCAA All-American, and a four-time EIWA Conference champion for the Cornell Big Red.

== Early life ==
Nahshon Garrett was born in Chico, California, the son of Golden Sizemore and Alvin Garrett, and grew up with two brothers and four sisters. Garrett would start wrestling at age 13. He attended Chico High School, where as a wrestler, he was a two-time California state champion. He graduated from Cornell University with a degree in developmental sociology in 2016.

== Wrestling career ==
Wrestling on the Cornell team, Garrett won the 133 pound NCAA Division I National Championship in 2016. He finished the 2015–2016 season with a perfect 37-0, and was the 2016 EIWA Wrestler of the Year. A four-time All American for Cornell University, his collegiate career record was 149-12, and he was selected for membership in the Quill and Dagger society.

Garrett competed at the 2016 Freestyle Wrestling Olympic Trials, losing a controversial match to Tony Ramos. In the match Garrett was leading 3-2 when he was hit with a stalling penalty point just seconds before the end of the match, giving Ramos the victory by decision.

After graduating from Cornell University, Nahshon moved to Arizona State University to train with Sunkist Kids and pursue an international wrestling career. In 2019 he moved to Tennessee to train for the 2020 Summer Olympics.
