= Jacob Cardenas =

American wrestler (born 1999)

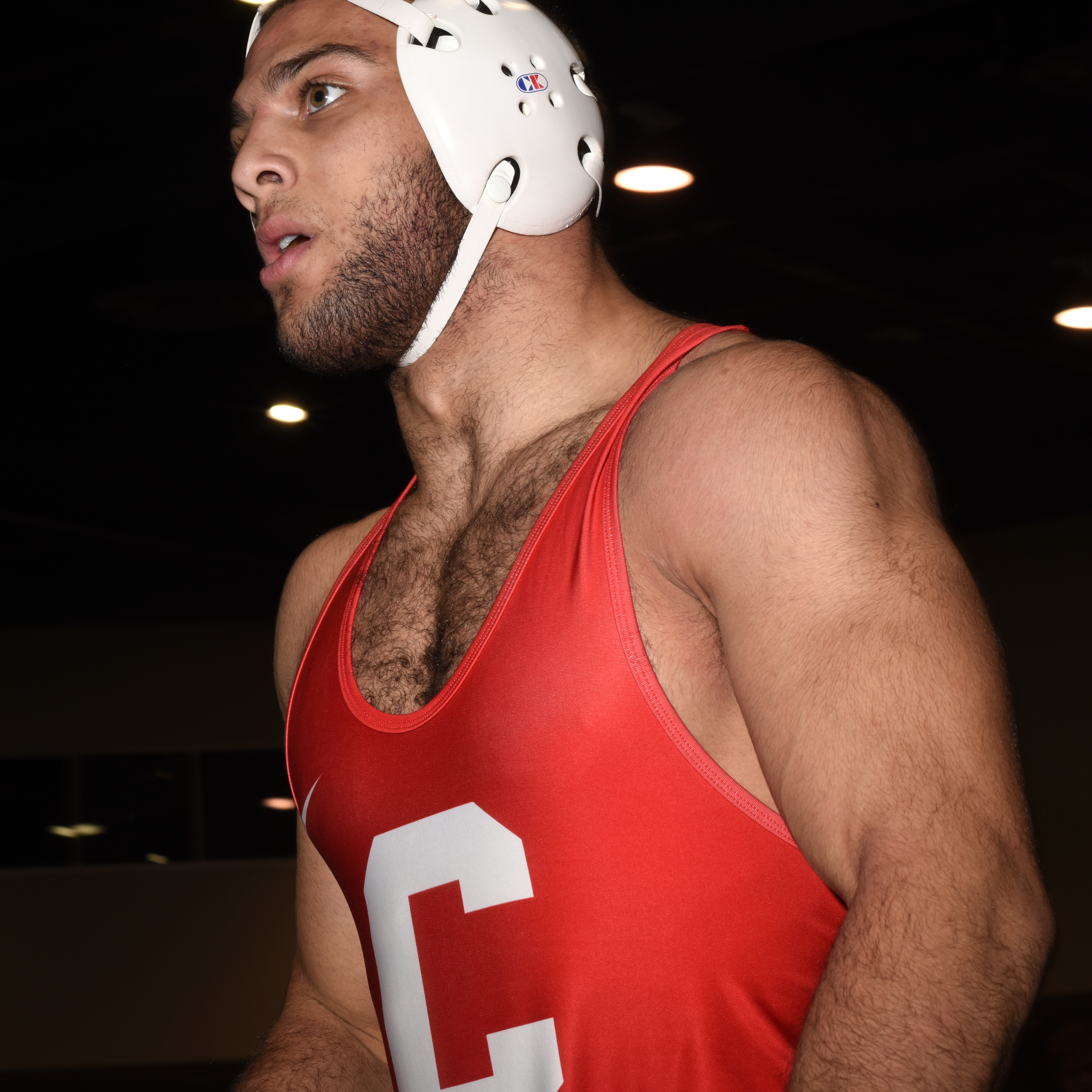
- Cardenas in 2021

Personal information
- Born: September 13, 2001 (age 24) Kearny, New Jersey, U.S.
- Weight: 92 kg (203 lb)

Sport
- Country: United States
- Sport: Wrestling
- Events: Freestyle and Folkstyle
- College team: Michan; Cornell
- Club: Cliff Keen Wrestling Club
Medal record
Men's freestyle wrestling
Representing the United States
Grand Prix
Gold medal – first place	2026 Nice	92 kg
Gold medal – first place	2025 New York City	92 kg
Silver medal – second place	2025 New York City	97 kg
U23 World Championships
Silver medal – second place	2022 Pontevedra	92 kg
Silver medal – second place	2024 Tirana	92 kg
Bronze medal – third place	2023 Tirana	92 kg
Men's collegiate wrestling
Representing the Michigan Wolverines
Big Ten Championships
Gold medal – first place	2025 Evanston	197 lb
Representing the Cornell Big Red
EIWA Championships
Gold medal – first place	2023 Philadelphia	197 lb
Silver medal – second place	2024 Lewisburg	197 lb

Jacob Cardenas (born September 13, 2001) is an American freestyle and folkstyle wrestler who competes at 92 kilograms. A four-time NCAA Division I Qualifier, Cardenas finished as a three-time NCAA Division I All-American. Cardenas is also a three-time U23 World Wrestling Championships medalist.

== Career ==
=== High school ===
Raised in Kearny, New Jersey, Cardenas attended Bergen Catholic High School, where he was a two-time New Jersey high school state champion (in 2018 and 2019) as well as capturing Super 32 and a Flo Nationals titles.

=== Cornell ===
==== 2019–2020 ====
Cardenas greyshirt'd during the 2019-2020 season compiling a 21-4 record competing for Spartan Combat RTC.

Cornell did not compete during the 2020-2021 season due to the COVID19 pandemic.

==== 2021–2022 ====
In his sophomore season at Cornell University, Cardenas competed at 197 pounds, where he qualified for the 2022 NCAA Championships. At the EIWA Championships, Cardenas placed fifth to secure an automatic NCAA bid. Cardenas went 1-2 at the NCAA tournament, finishing with a 22-8 record.

==== 2022–2023 ====
As a junior, Cardenas had a strong campaign at 197 lb, finishing with a 20–6 record. He claimed the EIWA 197-pound conference title, including a close 10-9 victory in the finals. Cardenas also earned his first NCAA All-American honor by placing eighth at the 2023 NCAA Championships with a 4-3 record. Cardenas finished the season with a 20-6 record.

==== 2023–2024 ====
During his senior year at Cornell, Cardenas had a successful season at 197 lb, posting a 28–8 record. He finished second at the EIWA Championships, and at the 2024 NCAA Division I Wrestling Championships, Cardenas placed fourth, becoming a two-time NCAA All-American.

=== Michigan ===
==== 2024–2025 ====
Following graduation from Cornell, Cardenas transferred to the University of Michigan as a graduate student for his final season of eligibility. Ivy League regulations do not allow graduate students to compete in athletics.

At the 2025 Big Ten Wrestling Championships, Cardenas advanced to the 197 lb finals, defeating top opponents including Penn State’s Josh Barr in the semifinals and then upset Iowa’s top-ranked Stephen Buchanan to win the conference title at 197 lb.

Entering the 2025 NCAA Championships as the No. 1 seed at 197 pounds, Cardenas won his opening matches via major decision and decision victories, ultimately earning All-American honors again. He reached the semifinals but fell to Penn State’s Josh Barr; Cardenas finished fourth at nationals, marking his third NCAA All-American placement and concluding his collegiate career with a 24–3 season record and a 95–25 overall collegiate record.

=== Freestyle ===
At 92 kg, Cardenas captured a silver medal at the 2022 U23 World Wrestling Championships, finishing with a 3-1 record. Competing at 92 kg, Cardenas captured a bronze medal at the 2023 U23 World Wrestling Championships, finishing with a 3-1 record. At the 2024 U23 World Wrestling Championships, Cardenas captured a silver medal at 92 kg, falling to Iran's Amir Hossein Firouzpour 11-4 in the gold medal bout.

== Freestyle record ==
Senior Freestyle Matches
Res.	Record	Opponent	Score	Date	Event	Location
2026 US Open 8th at 92 kg
Loss		(United States) Cody Merrill	FF	April 25, 2026	2025 US Open	(United States) Las Vegas, Nevada
Loss		(United States) Patrick Brophy	FF	April 25, 2026	2025 US Open	(United States) Las Vegas, Nevada
Win	28-16	(United States) Evan Bockman	7-1	April 25, 2026	2025 US Open	(United States) Las Vegas, Nevada
Loss	27-16	(United States) Dylan Bechtold	1-3	April 25, 2026	2025 US Open	(United States) Las Vegas, Nevada
Win	27-15	(United States) Silas Dailey	12-6	April 25, 2026	2025 US Open	(United States) Las Vegas, Nevada
2026 Muhamet Malo Ranking Series 5th at 92 kg
Loss	26-15	(Bulgaria) Akhmed Bataev	TF 0-11	February 25, 2026	2026 Muhamet Malo Tournament	Tirana, Albania
Win	26-14	(Albania) Albin Peposhi	7-3	February 25, 2026	2026 Muhamet Malo Tournament	Tirana, Albania
Loss	25-14	(Georgia (country)) Miriani Maisuradze	TF 0-11	February 25, 2026	2026 Muhamet Malo Tournament	Tirana, Albania
Win	25-13	(Turkmenistan) Döwletgeldi Myradow	12-5	February 25, 2026	2026 Muhamet Malo Tournament	Tirana, Albania
2026 Henri Deglane Grand Prix (gold) at 92 kg
Win	24-13	(Moldova) Ion Demian	6-6	January 10, 2026	2026 Henri Deglane Grand Prix	Nice, France
Win	23-13	(United States) Michael Macchiavello	TF 11-0	January 10, 2026	2026 Henri Deglane Grand Prix	Nice, France
Win	22-13	(Moldova) Serghei Vizii	TF 10-0	January 10, 2026	2026 Henri Deglane Grand Prix	Nice, France
Loss	21-13	(Germany) Daniel Fischer	Fall	January 10, 2026	2026 Henri Deglane Grand Prix	Nice, France
Win	21-12	(Georgia (country)) Teimuraz Kochkiani	TF 15-4	January 10, 2026	2026 Henri Deglane Grand Prix	Nice, France
Loss	20-12	(United States) Trent Hidlay	3-5	December 20, 2025	RAF 04	(United States) Fishers, Indiana
2025 Bill Farrell Memorial (silver) at 97 kg
Loss	20-11	(Russia) Yaraslau Slvikouski	2-4	November 7, 2025	2025 Bill Farrell Memorial International	(United States) New York City, New York
Win	20-10	(United States) Zane Lanham	10-2	November 7, 2025	2025 Bill Farrell Memorial International	(United States) New York City, New York
Win	19-10	(Dominican Republic) Luis Miguel Pérez	TF 10-0	November 7, 2025	2025 Bill Farrell Memorial International	(United States) New York City, New York
2025 Bill Farrell Memorial (gold) at 92 kg
Win	18-10	(Turkey) Omer Ozyildirim	TF 10-0	November 7, 2025	2025 Bill Farrell Memorial International	(United States) New York City, New York
RAF 01 205 lb (For RAF Light Heavyweight Championship)
Loss	17-10	(United States) Bo Nickal	4-6	August 30, 2025	RAF 01	(United States) Cleveland, Ohio
2024 U23 World Championships (silver) at 92 kg
Win	17-9	(Iran) Amir Hossein Firouzpour	4-11	October 21–27, 2024	2024 U23 World Championships	Tirana, Albania
Win	17-8	(Hungary) Musza Arsunkaev	5-2	October 21–27, 2024	2024 U23 World Championships	Tirana, Albania
Win	16-8	(Georgia (country)) Andro Margishvili	Fall	October 21–27, 2024	2024 U23 World Championships	Tirana, Albania
Win	15-8	(Poland) Igor Szucki	5-1	October 21–27, 2024	2024 U23 World Championships	Tirana, Albania
Win	14-8	(Authorised Neutral Athletes) Mustafagadzhi Malachdibirov	TF 10-0	October 21–27, 2024	2024 U23 World Championships	Tirana, Albania
2023 U23 World Championships (bronze) at 92 kg
Win	13-8	Pruthviraj Patil	4-3	October 23–29, 2023	2023 U23 World Championships	Tirana, Albania
Win	12-8	(Japan) Satoshi Miura	6-0	October 23–29, 2023	2023 U23 World Championships	Tirana, Albania
Loss	11-8	(Turkey) Muhammed Gimri	1-10	October 23–29, 2023	2023 U23 World Championships	Tirana, Albania
Win	11-7	(Authorised Neutral Athletes) Alan Bagaev	4-3	October 23–29, 2023	2023 U23 World Championships	Tirana, Albania
2023 US Open 7th at 92 kg
Win	10-7	(United States) John Gunderson	7-6	December 5, 2020	2022 Last Chance World Team Trials Qualifier	(United States) Las Vegas, Nevada
Loss	9-7	(United States) Jonathan Aiello	Fall	December 5, 2020	2022 Last Chance World Team Trials Qualifier	(United States) Las Vegas, Nevada
Win	9-6	(United States) Jake Lucas	TF 13-2	December 5, 2020	2022 Last Chance World Team Trials Qualifier	(United States) Las Vegas, Nevada
Loss	8-6	(United States) Nate Jackson	0-8	December 5, 2020	2022 Last Chance World Team Trials Qualifier	(United States) Las Vegas, Nevada
Win	8-5	(United States) Stephen Buchanan	INJ	December 5, 2020	2022 Last Chance World Team Trials Qualifier	(United States) Las Vegas, Nevada
Win	7-5	(United States) Kyle Haas	Fall	December 5, 2020	2022 Last Chance World Team Trials Qualifier	(United States) Las Vegas, Nevada
2022 U23 World Championships (silver) at 92 kg
Loss	6-5	(Iran) Amir Hossein Firouzpour	TF 0-10	October 22–23, 2022	2022 U23 World Championships	Pontevedra, Spain
Win	6-4	(Georgia (country)) Miriani Maisuradze	8-0	October 22–23, 2022	2022 U23 World Championships	Pontevedra, Spain
Win	5-4	(Kyrgyzstan) Baisal Kubatov	7-2	October 22–23, 2022	2022 U23 World Championships	Pontevedra, Spain
Win	4-4	(Ukraine) Denys Sahaliuk	4-0	October 22–23, 2022	2022 U23 World Championships	Pontevedra, Spain
2022 Last Chance World Team Trials Qualifier (bronze) at 92 kg
Win		(United States) Eli Sheeren	FF	December 5, 2020	2022 Last Chance World Team Trials Qualifier	(United States) Atlantic City, New Jersey
Win	3-4	(United States) David Tuttle	Fall	December 5, 2020	2022 Last Chance World Team Trials Qualifier	(United States) Atlantic City, New Jersey
Loss	2-4	(United States) Nate Jackson	TF 0-11	December 5, 2020	2022 Last Chance World Team Trials Qualifier	(United States) Atlantic City, New Jersey
Win	2-3	(United States) Eli Sheeren	TF 10-0	December 5, 2020	2022 Last Chance World Team Trials Qualifier	(United States) Atlantic City, New Jersey
2020 RTC Cup at 97 kg
Loss	1-3	(United States) Kollin Moore	TF 0-10	December 5, 2020	2020 FloWrestling RTC Cup	(United States) Cincinnati, Ohio
Loss	1-2	(United States) Ty Walz	0-7	December 5, 2020	2020 FloWrestling RTC Cup	(United States) Cincinnati, Ohio
Loss	1-1	(United States) Ty Walz	1-10	December 5, 2020	2020 FloWrestling RTC Cup	(United States) Cincinnati, Ohio
Win	1-0	(United States) Timmy McCall	7-4	December 5, 2020	2020 FloWrestling RTC Cup	(United States) Cincinnati, Ohio
