= Isaac Trumble =

American wrestler (born 2001)

Issac Trumble
Personal information
- Born: December 10, 2001 (age 24)
- Education: North Carolina State University
- Height: 6 ft 3 in (191 cm)
- Weight: 240 lb (109 kg)

Sport
- Country: United States
- Sport: Wrestling
- Event: Folkstyle wrestling
- College team: NC State
- Club: Wolfpack RTC
Medal record
Men's freestyle wrestling
Representing the United States
U23 World Championships
Gold medal – first place	2023 Tirana	97 kg
Men's collegiate wrestling
Representing the NC State Wolfpack
NCAA Division I Championships
Gold medal – first place	2026 Cleveland	285 lb
ACC Championships
Gold medal – first place	2026 Blacksburg	285 lb
Silver medal – second place	2022 Charlottesville	197 lb
Silver medal – second place	2023 Raleigh	197 lb

Issac Trumble (born 2001) is an American wrestler. He competes in collegiate wrestling for the North Carolina State Wolfpack.

== Biography ==
=== High School ===
Trumble is from Nebraska and attended Millard South High School. He was a 2x state wrestling champion.

=== College ===
He is part of the Army ROTC program.

As an heavyweight, he won the 2026 NCAA national championship, defeating Yonger Bastida of Iowa State in the finals.

=== Freestyle/Greco Roman ===
Trumble is a two-time U.S. Senior Open runner-up (2022, 2023) and is currently ranked No. 3 on the Senior National Freestyle Team. He was also a runner-up at the 2022 World Team Trials Challenge Tournament. Trumble captured gold at the 2023 U23 World Wrestling Championships competing at 97kg.

== Freestyle record ==
Senior freestyle matches
Res.	Record	Opponent	Score	Date	Event	Location
2026 US World Team Trials (silver) at 125 kg
Loss	23–13	(United States) Mason Parris	12–14	May 15, 2026	2026 US World Team Trials	(United States) Louisville, Kentucky
Win	23–12	(United States) Coby Merrill	3–0	May 15, 2026	2026 US World Team Trials	(United States) Louisville, Kentucky
Win	22–12	(United States) Cole Mirasola	Fall	May 15, 2026	2026 US World Team Trials	(United States) Louisville, Kentucky
2024 US Olympic Team Trials (silver) at 97 kg
Loss	21–12	(United States) Kyle Snyder	0–4	April 19, 2024	2024 US Olympic Team Trials	(United States) State College, Pennsylvania
Loss	21–11	(United States) Kyle Snyder	0–5	April 19, 2024	2024 US Olympic Team Trials	(United States) State College, Pennsylvania
Win	21–10	(United States) Kollin Moore	TF 11–1	April 19, 2024	2024 US Olympic Team Trials	(United States) State College, Pennsylvania
Win	20–10	(United States) Jonathan Aiello	6–4	April 19, 2024	2024 US Olympic Team Trials	(United States) State College, Pennsylvania
Win	19–10	(United States) Eric Schultz	7–3	April 19, 2024	2024 US Olympic Team Trials	(United States) State College, Pennsylvania
2024 Grand Prix Zagreb Open (bronze) at 97 kg
Win	18–10	(India) Vicky Chahar	8–5	January 10, 2024	2024 Grand Prix Zagreb Open	Zagreb, Croatia
Win	17–10	(Poland) Radosław Baran	14–10	January 10, 2024	2024 Grand Prix Zagreb Open	Zagreb, Croatia
Loss	16–10	(Iran) Amirali Azarpira	7–8	January 10, 2024	2024 Grand Prix Zagreb Open	Zagreb, Croatia
Win	16–9	(Germany) Erik Thiele	8–4	January 10, 2024	2024 Grand Prix Zagreb Open	Zagreb, Croatia
2023 U23 World Wrestling Championships (gold) at 97 kg
Win	15–9	(Moldova) Radu Lefter	TF 12–2	October 23, 2023	2023 U23 World Wrestling Championships	Tirana, Albania
Win	14–9	(Armenia) Sergey Sargsyan	TF 11–0	October 23, 2023	2023 U23 World Wrestling Championships	Tirana, Albania
Win	13–9	(Turkey) Oktay Ciftci	TF 11–0	October 23, 2023	2023 U23 World Wrestling Championships	Tirana, Albania
Win	12–9	(Japan) Hibiki Ito	13–4	October 23, 2023	2023 U23 World Wrestling Championships	Tirana, Albania
2023 US Open (silver) at 97 kg
Loss	11–9	(United States) J'den Cox	3–12	April 26, 2023	2023 US Open National Championships	(United States) Las Vegas, Nevada
Win	11–8	(United States) Timothy Dudley	Fall	April 26, 2023	2023 US Open National Championships	(United States) Las Vegas, Nevada
Win	10–8	(United States) Silas Allred	TF 10–0	April 26, 2023	2023 US Open National Championships	(United States) Las Vegas, Nevada
Win	9–8	(United States) Eric Gamble	TF 11–0	April 26, 2023	2023 US Open National Championships	(United States) Las Vegas, Nevada
Loss	8–8	(United States) Jonathan Aiello	6–8	June 8, 2022	Final X New York- Third Place	(United States) New York City, New York
2022 US World Team Trials (silver) at 92 kg
Loss	8–7	(United States) Nate Jackson	0–8	May 21, 2022	2022 US World Team Trials	(United States) Coralville, Iowa
Loss	8–6	(United States) Nate Jackson	TF 0–10	May 21, 2022	2022 US World Team Trials	(United States) Coralville, Iowa
Win	8–5	(United States) Cameron Caffey	TF 11–0	May 21, 2022	2022 US World Team Trials	(United States) Coralville, Iowa
Win	7–5	(United States) Pat Downey	Fall	May 21, 2022	2022 US World Team Trials	(United States) Coralville, Iowa
2022 US Open (silver) at 92 kg
Loss	6–5	(United States) Cameron Caffey	7–11	April 27, 2022	2022 US Open	(United States) Las Vegas, Nevada
Win	6–4	(United States) Max Shaw	TF 15–4	April 27, 2022	2022 US Open	(United States) Las Vegas, Nevada
Win	5–4	(United States) Clay Wahlstrom	TF 10–0	April 27, 2022	2022 US Open	(United States) Las Vegas, Nevada
2021 US World Team Trials DNP at 92 kg
Loss	4–4	(United States) Scottie Boykin	TF 2–13	September 11, 2021	2021 US World Team Trials	(United States) Lincoln, Nebraska
Loss	4–3	(United States) Nate Jackson	TF 0–10	September 11, 2021	2021 US World Team Trials	(United States) Lincoln, Nebraska
Win	4–2	(United States) Timothy Dudley	9–7	September 11, 2021	2021 US World Team Trials	(United States) Lincoln, Nebraska
2021 US Senior Nationals 5th at 97 kg
Win	3–2	(United States) Samuel Mitchell	Fall	April 30, 2021	2021 US Senior National Championships	(United States) Coralville, Iowa
Loss	2–2	(United States) Christopher Smith	3–10	April 30, 2021	2021 US Senior National Championships	(United States) Coralville, Iowa
Loss	2–1	(United States) Nathan Rotert	6–10	April 30, 2021	2021 US Senior National Championships	(United States) Coralville, Iowa
Win	2–0	(United States) Morgan Smith	TF 10–0	April 30, 2021	2021 US Senior National Championships	(United States) Coralville, Iowa
Win	1–0	(United States) Charles Swiggett	TF 10–0	April 30, 2021	2021 US Senior National Championships	(United States) Coralville, Iowa
