= Jonathan Aiello =

American freestyle wrestler

Jonathan Leonard Aiello
Personal information
- Full name: Jonathan Leonard Aiello
- Born: July 13, 1998 (age 28) Centreville, Virginia, U.S.
- Weight: 97 kg (214 lb)

Sport
- Country: United States
- Sport: Wrestling
- Events: Folkstyle and Freestyle
- College team: Virginia
- Club: Ohio Regional Training Center
- Coached by: Steve Garland

Achievements and titles
- Highest world ranking: 18
Medal record
Men's freestyle wrestling
Representing the United States
Grand Prix
Gold medal – first place	2022 Warsaw	92 kg
Gold medal – first place	2024 Taraz	97 kg
Silver medal – second place	2023 Henri Deglane	92 kg
Silver medal – second place	2024 Yasar Dogu	97kg
Bronze medal – third place	2025 Zagreb	97 kg
Bronze medal – third place	2025 Budapest	97 kg
U23 World Championships
Bronze medal – third place	2021 Belgrade	97 kg

Jonathan "Jay" Aiello is an American freestyle wrestler who has represented the United States on both the U23 and Senior Level. His most notable finish is capturing a bronze medal at the 2021 U23 World Wrestling Championships in Belgrade, at the 97 kg. He is Currently training as a part of the Ohio Regional Training Center and competing at 97 kg.

Over the past few years he has recorded notable victories over world medalists, including over 2023 92 kg World Champion Rizabek Aitmukhan at the 2024 Kunayev Tournament held in Taraz, Kazakhstan.

== Career ==
=== High school ===
Aiello excelled as a multiple sport athlete for Westfield High School, being named to the Washington Post All-Metro area football and wrestling teams his senior year 2015-2016. He won the 2016 Virginia Class 6A 195-pound wrestling state championship as a senior. Aiello was also named the Virginia Class 6A player of the year in football.

=== College ===
Aiello was a five-year starter for the University of Virginia wrestling team, competing in the 197-pound weight class. His collegiate career was highlighted by a 2020 NWCA First-team All-American Honor and a 2020 ACC Championship at 197-pounds.

== Freestyle career ==
Aiello is a two time U.S. National Team member, having represented the United States on the senior level multiple times.

=== U23 ===
==== 2021 ====
Aiello made his international freestyle debut at the 2021 U23 World Wrestling Championships where won a bronze medal in the 97 kg division. During the tournament he recorded a win over Feyzullah Aktürk, a Senior World Bronze Medalist in 2023.

=== Senior ===
==== 2022 ====
Coming off of his bronze medal in Serbia, Aiello competed to claim a world team spot at 92 kg, coming up short placing 3rd at the 2022 US World Team Trials. His third-place finished earned him any opportunity to claim a National Team slot at Final X by wrestling for true third against Isaac Trumble. Aiello prevailed in the bout winning 8–6 to make the US National Team. Later in the year he would compete at the 2022 Poland Open winning the tournament with a win over, Andriy Vlasov, who had placed 5th at the 2021 World Wrestling Championships.

==== 2023 ====
Aiello competed in the Grand Prix de France Henri Deglane 2023, placing 2nd with a lone loss to fellow American Eric Shultz Jr. He also competed at the 2023 Grand Prix Zagreb Open, failing to place, suffering losses to multiple time senior world medalist Osman Nurmagomedov and another American, Kollin Moore. Later in the year Aiello would once again compete to make a US senior world team, this time coming up short and failing to make the medal stand. Aiello would finish the year capturing a third-place finish at the 2023 US Senior Nationals.

==== 2024 ====
Aiello started the year off capturing a silver medal at the 2024 Yasar Dogu Tournament, recording wins over Ertuğrul Ağca and Radu Lefter, but ultimately losing in the finals to the reigning World Champion at 97 kg champion, Akhmed Tazhudinov at the Yasar Dogu. Aiello then competed at the Olympic Team Trials recording a win over 2018 NCAA Champion Michael Macchiavello, but ultimately failed to make the medal stand. Aiello competed next at the 2024 Bill Farrell Memorial International Tournament, placing third.

In December 2024 Aiello travelled to Taraz, Kazakhstan to compete in the Kunayev D.A., an international tournament. Aiello captured the gold medal-winning the tournament by defeating 2023 World Champion Rizabek Aitmukhan and 2024 Olympian from China, Awusayiman Habila.

==== 2025 ====
Coming off of a great finish in 2024, Aiello competed in the 2025 Grand Prix Zagreb Open, dropping a match in the semifinals to Abolfazl Babaloo of Iran, he finished the tournament capturing the bronze medal. Aiello would then compete in April at the 2025 CLAW U.S. Open Championships, finishing second. His only loss of the tournament was to World and Olympic Champion Kyle Snyder. A month later Aiello would place second at the 2025 Senior World Team Trials, losing in the finals to 2022 World Team Member Hayden Zillmer. His second-place finish would secure him a spot on the 2025 US National Team.

In July, Aiello traveled to Budapest for the 2025 Polyák Imre & Varga János Memorial Tournament a United World Wrestling Ranking Series event. After dropping his first match on criteria to a 2024 Olympian Zbigniew Baranowski, he battled back and took home a bronze medal. Aiello would take the mat again 4 days later at PWL 9, defeating Konstantin Pshenichnikov of Russia 8–1 to secure one of the US's 4 victories in the dual meet against the Russian National Team. Aiello was invited to compete in PWL 10, this time taking the mat against world #8 Ranked Russian, Alikhan Ktsoev. After a back and forth bout Aiello came up short as he almost scored as time expired, losing the bout 5-4.

== Freestyle Record ==
Senior Freestyle Matches
Res.	Record	Opponent	Score	Date	Event	Location
2026 Bill Farrell Memorial (gold) at 97 kg
Win	60-23	(United States) Jacob Cardenas	TF 13-2	November 7, 2026	2026 Bill Farrell Memorial	(United States) New York, New York
Win	59-23	(United States) Massoma Endene	TF 15-4	November 7, 2026	2026 Bill Farrell Memorial	(United States) New York, New York
Win	58-23	(United States) Cameron Caffery	10-0	November 7, 2026	2026 Bill Farrell Memorial	(United States) New York, New York
2026 US Open (bronze) at 97 kg
Win	57-23	(United States) Justin Rademacher	TF 10-0	April 25, 2026	2026 US Open	(United States) Las Vegas, Nevada
Win	56-23	(United States) Zane Lahman	TF 11-1	April 25, 2026	2026 US Open	(United States) Las Vegas, Nevada
Loss	55-23	(United States) Hayden Zilmer	4-5	April 25, 2026	2026 US Open	(United States) Las Vegas, Nevada
Win	55-22	(United States) Connor Mirasola	6-2	April 25, 2026	2026 US Open	(United States) Las Vegas, Nevada
Win	54-22	(United States) Braden Baumgart	TF 11-0	April 25, 2026	2026 US Open	(United States) Las Vegas, Nevada
2026 Muhamet Malo Ranking Series DNP at 97 kg
Loss	53-22	(Azerbaijan) Magomedkhan Magomedov	TF 2-13	February 26, 2026	2026 Muhamet Malo Tournament	Tirana, Albania
Win	53-21	(Germany) Erik Thiele	8-6	February 26, 2026	2026 Muhamet Malo Tournament	Tirana, Albania
Win	52-21	(Australia) Thomas Barns	TF 10-0	February 26, 2026	2026 Muhamet Malo Tournament	Tirana, Albania
PWL 10 at 97 kg
Loss	51-21	(Russia) Alikhan Ktsoev	4-5	November 8, 2025	PWL 10	Moscow, Russia
PWL 9 at 97 kg
Win	51-20	(Russia) Konstantin Pshenichnikov	8-1	July 21, 2025	PWL 9	Budapest, Hungary
2025 Polyák Imre & Varga János Memorial Tournament (bronze) 97 kg
Win	50-20	(South Korea) Seo Ju-hwan	TF 10-0	Jul 17-18, 2025	2025 Polyák Imre & Varga János Memorial Tournament	Budapest, Hungary
Win	49-20	(India) Vicky Vicky	Fall	Jul 17-18, 2025	2025 Polyák Imre & Varga János Memorial Tournament	Budapest, Hungary
Loss	48–20	(Poland) Zbigniew Baranowski	6-6	Jul 17-18, 2025	2025 Polyák Imre & Varga János Memorial Tournament	Budapest, Hungary
2025 World Team Trials Championships (silver) at 97 kg
Loss	48-19	(United States) Hayden Zillmer	3-5	May 16–17, 2025	2025 World Team Trials	(United States) Louisville, Kentucky
Win	48-18	(United States) Justin Rademacher	11-4	May 16–17, 2025	2025 World Team Trials	(United States) Louisville, Kentucky
Win	47-18	(United States) Ethan Laird	11-3	May 16–17, 2025	2025 World Team Trials	(United States) Louisville, Kentucky
2025 CLAW U.S. Open Championships (silver) at 97 kg
Loss	46-18	(United States) Kyle Snyder	TF 0-10	April 23–27, 2025	2025 CLAW U.S. Open Championships	(United States) Las Vegas, Nevada
Win	46-17	(United States) Zane Lanham	TF 12-2	April 23–27, 2025	2025 CLAW U.S. Open Championships	(United States) Las Vegas, Nevada
Win	45-17	(United States) Jett Swain	TF 10-0	April 23–27, 2025	2025 CLAW U.S. Open Championships	(United States) Las Vegas, Nevada
Win	44-17	(United States) Ethan Laird	TF 10-0	April 23–27, 2025	2025 CLAW U.S. Open Championships	(United States) Las Vegas, Nevada
FloWrestling Night in America Lee vs. Ono at 97 kg
Win	43-17	(United States) Marcus Coleman	TF 12-1	February 26, 2025	FloWrestling Night in America Lee vs. Ono	(United States) Corralville, Iowa
2025 Grand Prix Zagreb Open (bronze) at 97 kg
Win	42-17	(Georgia (country)) Merab Suleimanishvili	FF	February 5–9, 2025	2025 Grand Prix Zagreb Open	Zagreb, Croatia
loss	41-17	(Iran) Abolfazl Babaloo	6-5	February 5–9, 2025	2025 Grand Prix Zagreb Open	Zagreb, Croatia
Win	41-16	(Georgia (country)) Andro Margishvili	FF	February 5–9, 2025	2025 Grand Prix Zagreb Open	Zagreb, Croatia
2024 Kunayev D.A. (gold) at 97 kg
Win	40-16	(China) Awusayiman Habila	Fall	December 20, 2024	2024 Kunayev D.A.	Taraz,Kazakhstan
Win	39-16	(Kazakhstan) Rizabek Aitmukhan	12-9	December 20, 2024	2024 Kunayev D.A.	Taraz,Kazakhstan
Win	38-16	(Kazakhstan) Manas Ulan	TF 10-0	December 20, 2024	2024 Kunayev D.A.	Taraz,Kazakhstan
2024 Bill Farrell Memorial (bronze) at 97 kg
Win	37-16	(Dominican Republic) Luis Miguel Perez Sosa	TF 10-0	November 14, 2024	2024 Bill Farrell Memorial	(United States) New York, New York
Win	36-16	(United States) Justin Rademacher	TF 10-0	November 14, 2024	2024 Bill Farrell Memorial	(United States) New York, New York
Loss	35-16	(United States) Gary Traub	TF 0-11	November 14, 2024	2024 Bill Farrell Memorial	(United States) New York, New York
2024 Senior World Team Trials DNP at 92 kg
Loss	35-15	(United States) Marcus Coleman	TF 0-10	September 14–15, 2024	2024 Senior World Team Trials	(United States) Omaha, Nebraska
Loss	35-14	(United States) Trent Hidlay	TF 0-11	September 14–15, 2024	2024 Senior World Team Trials	(United States) Omaha, Nebraska
Win	35-13	(United States) Aedon Sinclair	13-5	September 14–15, 2024	2024 Senior World Team Trials	(United States) Omaha, Nebraska
Win	34-13	(United States) Luke Duthie	TF 10-0	September 14–15, 2024	2024 Senior World Team Trials	(United States) Omaha, Nebraska
2024 United States Olympic trials DNP at 97 kg
Loss	33-13	(United States) Nate Jackson	2-13	April 19–20, 2024	2024 United States Olympic trials (wrestling)	(United States) State College, Pennsylvania
loss	33-12	(United States) Isaac Trumble	4-6	April 19–20, 2024	2024 United States Olympic trials (wrestling)	(United States) State College, Pennsylvania
Win	33-11	(United States) Michael Macchiavello	8-4	April 19–20, 2024	2024 United States Olympic trials (wrestling)	(United States) State College, Pennsylvania
2024 Yaşar Doğu Tournament (silver) at 97 kg
Loss	32-11	(Bahrain) Akhmed Tazhudinov	TF 0-10	March 7–10, 2024	2024 Yaşar Doğu Tournament	Antalya, Turkey
Win	32-10	(Moldova) Radu Lefter	TF 17-6	March 7–10, 2024	2024 Yaşar Doğu Tournament	Antalya, Turkey
Win	31-10	(Germany) Ertuğrul Ağca	8-2	March 7–10, 2024	2024 Yaşar Doğu Tournament	Antalya, Turkey
Win	30-10	(Georgia (country)) Merab Suleimanishvili	Fall	March 7–10, 2024	2024 Yaşar Doğu Tournament	Antalya, Turkey
2023 Wrestling Senior Nationals (bronze) at 97 kg
Win	29-10	(United States) Eric Shultz Jr.	9-4	December 12–15, 2023	2023 Wrestling Senior Nationals	(United States) Dallas, Texas
Win	28-10	(United States) Anthony Cassioppi	Fall	December 12–15, 2023	2023 Wrestling Senior Nationals	(United States) Dallas, Texas
Loss	27-10	(United States) Kollin Moore	5-0	December 12–15, 2023	2023 Wrestling Senior Nationals	(United States) Dallas, Texas
Win	27-9	(United States) Jacob Warner	7-6	December 12–15, 2023	2023 Wrestling Senior Nationals	(United States) Dallas, Texas
Win	26-8	(United States) Tyrie Houghton	TF 10-0	December 12–15, 2023	2023 Wrestling Senior Nationals	(United States) Dallas, Texas
2023 Bill Farrell Memorial (bronze) at 97 kg
Win	24-9	(United States) Eric Shultz Jr.	TF 10-0	November 17, 2023	2023 Bill Farrell Memorial	(United States) New York, New York
Win	23-9	(United States) Cole Mirasola	TF 10-0	November 17, 2023	2023 Bill Farrell Memorial	(United States) New York, New York
Loss	22-9	(United States) Michael Macchiavello	TF 0-11	November 17, 2023	2023 Bill Farrell Memorial	(United States) New York, New York
Win	22-8	(United States) Eric Shultz Jr.	10-5	November 17, 2023	2023 Bill Farrell Memorial	(United States) New York, New York
2023 US Open Wrestling Championships 5th at 92 kg
Win	21-8	(United States) Morgan McIntosh	FF	April 26 - May 1, 2023	2023 US Open Wrestling Championships	(United States) Las Vegas, Nevada
Loss	20-8	(United States) Eric Shultz Jr.	0-8	April 26 - May 1, 2023	2023 US Open Wrestling Championships	(United States) Las Vegas, Nevada
Win	20-7	(United States) Jacob Cardenas	Fall	April 26 - May 1, 2023	2023 US Open Wrestling Championships	(United States) Las Vegas, Nevada
Win	19-7	(United States) Kyle Haas	TF 10-0	April 26 - May 1, 2023	2023 US Open Wrestling Championships	(United States) Las Vegas, Nevada
Loss	18-7	(United States) Michael Macchiavello	0-4	April 26 - May 1, 2023	2023 US Open Wrestling Championships	(United States) Las Vegas, Nevada
Win	18-6	(United States) David Willoughby	TF 10-0	April 26 - May 1, 2023	2023 US Open Wrestling Championships	(United States) Las Vegas, Nevada
Win	17-6	(United States) Thomas Gaitan	Fall	April 26 - May 1, 2023	2023 US Open Wrestling Championships	(United States) Las Vegas, Nevada
2023 Grand Prix Zagreb Open DNP at 92 kg
Loss	16-6	(Azerbaijan) Osman Nurmagomedov	2-13	February 1–5, 2023	2023 Grand Prix Zagreb Open	Zagreb, Croatia
loss	16-5	(United States) Kollin Moore	5-5	February 1–5, 2023	2023 Grand Prix Zagreb Open	Zagreb, Croatia
Win	16-4	(France) Adlan Viskhanov	TF 10-0	February 1–5, 2023	2023 Grand Prix Zagreb Open	Zagreb, Croatia
Grand Prix de France Henri Deglane 2023 (silver) at 92 kg
Loss	15-4	(United States) Eric Schultz Jr.	1-9	January 20–22, 2023	Grand Prix de France Henri Deglane 2023	Nice, France
Win	15-3	(France) Adlan Viskhanov	Fall	January 20–22, 2023	Grand Prix de France Henri Deglane 2023	Nice, France
Win	14-3	(Spain) Aimar Alzón	Fall	January 20–22, 2023	Grand Prix de France Henri Deglane 2023	Nice, France
2022 Poland Open (gold) at 92 kg
Win	13-3	(Poland) Radosław Marcinkiewicz	5-0	July 20–24, 2022	2022 Poland Open	Warsaw, Poland
Win	12-3	(Ukraine) Andriy Vlasov	TF 11–0	July 20–24, 2022	2022 Poland Open	Warsaw, Poland
Win	11-3	(Poland) Patryk Dublinowski	TF 11–0	July 20–24, 2022	2022 Poland Open	Warsaw, Poland
Final X (bronze) at 92 kg
Win	10-3	(United States) Isaac Trumble	8-6	June 8, 2022	Final X True 3rd	(United States) Madison Square Garden
2022 US World Team Trials Challenge Tournament (bronze) at 92 kg
Win	9-3	(United States) Cameron Caffey	6-3	May 21–22, 2022	2022 US World Team Trials Challenge Tournament	(United States) Coralville, Iowa
Win	8-3	(United States) Levi Hopkins	TF 10-0	May 21–22, 2022	2022 US World Team Trials Challenge Tournament	(United States) Coralville, Iowa
Loss	7-3	(United States) Nathan Dyamin Jackson	TF 0-11	May 21–22, 2022	2022 US World Team Trials Challenge Tournament	(United States) Coralville, Iowa
Win	7-2	(United States) Max Shaw	TF 10-0	May 21–22, 2022	2022 US World Team Trials Challenge Tournament	(United States) Coralville, Iowa
2022 USMC US Open Wrestling Championships (bronze) at 92 kg
Win	6-2	(United States) Timothy Dudley	FF	April 27-2, 2021	2022 USMC US Open Wrestling Championships	(United States) Las Vegas, Nevada
Win	5–2	(United States) Samuel Mitchell	TF 12-1	April 27-2, 2021	2022 USMC US Open Wrestling Championships	(United States) Las Vegas, Nevada
Loss	4-2	(United States) Joe Rau	Fall	April 27-2, 2021	2022 USMC US Open Wrestling Championships	(United States) Las Vegas, Nevada
Win	4-1	(United States) Duncan Lee	Fall	April 27-2, 2021	2022 USMC US Open Wrestling Championships	(United States) Las Vegas, Nevada
2021 U23 World Wrestling Championships (bronze) at 97 kg
Win	3-1	(Belarus) Vasil Pauliuchenka	3–2	November 1–7, 2021	2021 U23 World Wrestling Championships	Belgrade, Serbia
Loss	2–1	(Iran) Amir Ali Azarpira	0-9	November 1–7, 2021	2021 U23 World Wrestling Championships	Belgrade, Serbia
Win	2–0	(Russia) Shamil Gadzhialiev	4-4	November 1–7, 2021	2021 U23 World Wrestling Championships	Belgrade, Serbia
Win	1–0	(Turkey) Feyzullah Aktürk	5-3	November 1–7, 2021	2021 U23 World Wrestling Championships	Belgrade, Serbia
