= 2023 Grand Prix Zagreb Open =

Wrestling event held in Zagreb, Croatia

- Host city: Zagreb, Croatia
- Dates: 1-5 February 2023
- Stadium: Dom Sportova

Champions
- Freestyle: United States
- Greco-Roman: Iran
- Women: Japan

The 2023 Grand Prix Zagreb Open, was a wrestling event held in Zagreb, Croatia between 1 and 5 February 2023. It was held as the first of the ranking series of United World Wrestling in 2023. With an aim to reward wrestlers participating in Ranking Series tournaments, the United World Wrestling will award prize money to the medal winners in all weight classes with a total prize money of 390,000 Swiss Francs. The gold medal winners at the four Ranking Series tournaments in 2023 will receive 1500 Swiss Francs with the silver medallists getting 750 Swiss Francs. The two bronze medallists will receive 500 Swiss Francs each.

== Ranking Series ==
Ranking Series Calendar 2023 of United World Wrestling:

- 1st Ranking Series: 1-5 February, Croatia, Zagreb ⇒ 2023 Grand Prix Zagreb Open
- 2nd Ranking Series: 23-26 February, Egypt, Alexandria ⇒ 2023 Ibrahim Moustafa Tournament
- 3rd Ranking Series: 1-4 June, Kyrgyzstan, Bishkek ⇒ 2023 Kaba Uulu Kozhomkul & Raatbek Sanatbaev Tournament
- 4th Ranking Series: 13-16 July, Hungary, Budapest ⇒ 2023 Polyák Imre & Varga János Memorial Tournament

== Competition schedule ==
All times are (UTC+2)

Date	Time	Event
1 February Wednesday	10.00-14.30	Qualification rounds & repechage FS 57-61-65-70-74-86 kg
1 February Wednesday	18.00-20.30	Final matches and awarding ceremony: FS 57-61-65-70-74-86 kg
2 February Thursday	10.00-14.30	Qualification rounds & repechage FS 79-92-97-125 kg & WW 50-55 kg
2 February Thursday	18.00-20.30	Final matches and awarding ceremony: Finals FS 79-92-97-125 kg & WW 50-55 kg
3 February Friday	10.00-14.30	Qualification rounds & repechage WW 59-62-65-68 kg & GR 77-87 kg
3 February Friday	18.00-20.30	Final matches and awarding ceremony: Finals WW 59-62-65-68 kg & GR 77-87 kg
4 February Saturday	10.00-14.30	Qualification rounds & repechage WW 53-57-72-76kg & GR 63-67 kg
4 February Saturday	18.00-20.30	Final matches and awarding ceremony: Finals WW 53-57-72-76kg & GR 63-67 kg
5 February Sunday	10.00-14.30	Qualification rounds & repechage GR 55-60-72-82-97-130 kg
5 February Sunday	18.00-20.30	Final matches and awarding ceremony: Finals GR 55-60-72-82-97-130 kg

== Medal table ==
* Host nation (Croatia)

Rank	Nation	Gold	Silver	Bronze	Total
1	Iran	8	6	5	19
2	Japan	6	3	2	11
3	United States	6	2	6	14
4	Azerbaijan	2	3	7	12
5	China	1	2	5	8
6	Moldova	1	2	2	5
7	Mongolia	1	2	1	4
8	Hungary	1	1	4	6
9	Bulgaria	1	0	2	3
9	France	1	0	2	3
9	Turkey	1	0	2	3
12	Cuba	1	0	1	2
13	Georgia	0	2	3	5
14	Norway	0	2	0	2
15	Croatia*	0	1	3	4
16	Uzbekistan	0	1	1	2
17	Czech Republic	0	1	0	1
17	Italy	0	1	0	1
17	Kyrgyzstan	0	1	0	1
20	Canada	0	0	2	2
20	India	0	0	2	2
20	Poland	0	0	2	2
23	Denmark	0	0	1	1
23	Netherlands	0	0	1	1
23	Romania	0	0	1	1
Totals (25 entries)		30	30	55	115

== Team ranking ==
Rank	Men's freestyle		Men's Greco-Roman		Women's freestyle	
Rank	Team	Points	Team	Points	Team	Points
1	United States	174	Iran	195	Japan	191
2	Iran	140	Hungary	80	United States	129
3	Azerbaijan	135	Azerbaijan	80	Moldova	75
4	Georgia	84	Uzbekistan	73	China	58
5	Mongolia	70	China	60	Canada	38
6	Hungary	64	Croatia	60	India	35
7	Japan	56	Bulgaria	44	Italy	32
8	India	43	Norway	44	Hungary	29
9	Turkey	42	Cuba	40	Croatia	27
10	China	41	Romania	39	Poland	27

== Medal overview ==
=== Men's freestyle ===
Event	Gold	Silver	Bronze
57 kg	Aliabbas Rzazade; Azerbaijan	Yuto Nishiuchi; Japan	Aman Sehrawat; India
57 kg	Aliabbas Rzazade; Azerbaijan	Yuto Nishiuchi; Japan	Beka Bujiashvili; Georgia
61 kg	Reza Atri; Iran	Narmandakhyn Narankhuu; Mongolia	Gamzatgadzsi Halidov; Hungary
61 kg	Reza Atri; Iran	Narmandakhyn Narankhuu; Mongolia	Emrah Ormanoğlu; Turkey
65 kg	Tömör-Ochiryn Tulga; Mongolia	Joseph McKenna; United States	Ali Rahimzade; Azerbaijan
65 kg	Tömör-Ochiryn Tulga; Mongolia	Joseph McKenna; United States	Evan Henderson; United States
70 kg	Alec Pantaleo; United States	Haji Aliyev; Azerbaijan	Giorgi Elbakidze; Georgia
70 kg	Alec Pantaleo; United States	Haji Aliyev; Azerbaijan	Khadzhimurad Gadzhiyev; Azerbaijan
74 kg	Jason Nolf; United States	Younes Emami; Iran	Fazlı Eryılmaz; Turkey
74 kg	Jason Nolf; United States	Younes Emami; Iran	Dzhabrail Gadzhiev; Azerbaijan
79 kg	Ali Savadkouhi; Iran	Avtandil Kentchadze; Georgia	Chance Marsteller; United States
79 kg	Ali Savadkouhi; Iran	Avtandil Kentchadze; Georgia	Vladimeri Gamkrelidze; Georgia
86 kg	Hassan Yazdani; Iran	Hayato Ishiguro; Japan	Mark Hall; United States
86 kg	Hassan Yazdani; Iran	Hayato Ishiguro; Japan	Zahid Valencia; United States
92 kg	Kollin Moore; United States	Miriani Maisuradze; Georgia	Ganbaataryn Gankhuyag; Mongolia
92 kg	Kollin Moore; United States	Miriani Maisuradze; Georgia	Osman Nurmagomedov; Azerbaijan
97 kg	Kyle Snyder; United States	Amir Ali Azarpira; Iran	Habila Awusayiman; China
97 kg	Kyle Snyder; United States	Amir Ali Azarpira; Iran	Magomedkhan Magomedov; Azerbaijan
125 kg	Amir Hossein Zare; Iran	Giorgi Meshvildishvili; Azerbaijan	Robert Baran; Poland
125 kg	Amir Hossein Zare; Iran	Giorgi Meshvildishvili; Azerbaijan	Dániel Ligeti; Hungary

=== Men's Greco-Roman ===
Event	Gold	Silver	Bronze
55 kg	Pouya Dadmarz; Iran	Ikhtiyor Botirov; Uzbekistan	Mohammad Mahdi Farid; Iran
60 kg	Mehdi Mohsennejad; Iran	Nihat Mammadli; Azerbaijan	Maito Kawana; Japan
60 kg	Mehdi Mohsennejad; Iran	Nihat Mammadli; Azerbaijan	Răzvan Arnăut; Romania
63 kg	Taleh Mammadov; Azerbaijan	Aref Hossein Mohammadi; Iran	Ivan Lizatović; Croatia
63 kg	Taleh Mammadov; Azerbaijan	Aref Hossein Mohammadi; Iran	Iman Mohammadi; Iran
67 kg	Husiyuetu; China	Reza Abbasi; Iran	Luis Orta; Cuba
67 kg	Husiyuetu; China	Reza Abbasi; Iran	Ashu Bazard; India
72 kg	Selçuk Can; Turkey	Sajjad Imentalab; Iran	Jamol Jumabaev; Uzbekistan
72 kg	Selçuk Can; Turkey	Sajjad Imentalab; Iran	Ibrahim Ghanem; France
77 kg	Mohammad Ali Geraei; Iran	Alexandrin Guțu; Moldova	Amin Kavianinejad; Iran
77 kg	Mohammad Ali Geraei; Iran	Alexandrin Guțu; Moldova	Aik Mnatsakanian; Bulgaria
82 kg	Alireza Mohmadi; Iran	Filip Šačić; Croatia	Péter Dömök; Hungary
82 kg	Alireza Mohmadi; Iran	Filip Šačić; Croatia	Pejman Poshtam; Iran
87 kg	István Takács; Hungary	Nasser Alizadeh; Iran	Turpal Bisultanov; Denmark
87 kg	István Takács; Hungary	Nasser Alizadeh; Iran	Ivan Huklek; Croatia
97 kg	Kiril Milov; Bulgaria	Tamás Lévai; Hungary	Tyrone Sterkenburg; Netherlands
97 kg	Kiril Milov; Bulgaria	Tamás Lévai; Hungary	Murat Lokyaev; Azerbaijan
130 kg	Óscar Pino; Cuba	Oskar Marvik; Norway	Amir Ghasemi Monjazi; Iran
130 kg	Óscar Pino; Cuba	Oskar Marvik; Norway	Meng Lingzhe; China

=== Women's freestyle ===
Event	Gold	Silver	Bronze
50 kg	Yui Susaki; Japan	Zhu Jiang; China	Feng Ziqi; China
50 kg	Yui Susaki; Japan	Zhu Jiang; China	Fan Meng; China
53 kg	Akari Fujinami; Japan	Bat-Ochiryn Bolortuyaa; Mongolia	Samantha Stewart; Canada
53 kg	Akari Fujinami; Japan	Bat-Ochiryn Bolortuyaa; Mongolia	Iulia Leorda; Moldova
55 kg	Moe Kiyooka; Japan	Mariana Drăguțan; Moldova	Erika Bognár; Hungary
57 kg	Sae Nanjo; Japan	Feng Yongxin; China	Jowita Wrzesień; Poland
57 kg	Sae Nanjo; Japan	Feng Yongxin; China	Zhang Qi; China
59 kg	Anastasia Nichita; Moldova	Yui Sakano; Japan	Alyona Kolesnik; Azerbaijan
62 kg	Sakura Motoki; Japan	Grace Bullen; Norway	Kayla Miracle; United States
62 kg	Sakura Motoki; Japan	Grace Bullen; Norway	Bilyana Dudova; Bulgaria
65 kg	Mahiro Yoshitake; Japan	Mallory Velte; United States	Iva Gerić; Croatia
68 kg	Koumba Larroque; France	Adéla Hanzlíčková; Czech Republic	Irina Rîngaci; Moldova
68 kg	Koumba Larroque; France	Adéla Hanzlíčková; Czech Republic	Pauline Lecarpentier; France
72 kg	Skylar Grote; United States	Dalma Caneva; Italy	Sumire Niikura; Japan
76 kg	Yelena Makoyed; United States	Aiperi Medet Kyzy; Kyrgyzstan	Justina Di Stasio; Canada
76 kg	Yelena Makoyed; United States	Aiperi Medet Kyzy; Kyrgyzstan	Dymond Guilford; United States

== Participating nations ==
489 wrestlers from 41 countries:

1. Argentina (3)
2. Austria (10)
3. Azerbaijan (30)
4. Brazil (2)
5. Bulgaria (10)
6. Canada (18)
7. China (39)
8. Croatia (18) (Host)
9. Cuba (2)
10. Czech Republic (5)
11. Denmark (3)
12. Ecuador (4)
13. Egypt (3)
14. Spain (2)
15. Estonia (2)
16. Finland (7)
17. France (22)
18. Georgia (9)
19. Hungary (32)
20. India (19)
21. Iran (24)
22. Israel (3)
23. Italy (15)
24. Japan (29)
25. Kyrgyzstan (2)
26. Latvia (1)
27. Lithuania (15)
28. Moldova (8)
29. Mongolia (7)
30. Netherlands (2)
31. Norway (7)
32. Poland (30)
33. Puerto Rico (2)
34. Romania (6)
35. San Marino (1)
36. Serbia (6)
37. Switzerland (6)
38. Slovakia (3)
39. Turkey (9)
40. United States (54)
41. Uzbekistan (19)

== Results ==
=== Men's freestyle ===
==== Men's freestyle 57 kg ====
Legend

- F — Won by fall

Round of 16
Aman Sehrawat (IND)	8
Liu Minghu (CHN)	2
Yuto Nishiuchi (JPN)	6
Darian Cruz (PUR)	6
Rikuto Arai (JPN)	6
Zane Richards (USA)	10
Li Weiyu (CHN)	1
Islam Bazarganov (AZE)	6
Zou Wanhao (CHN)	8
Aliabbas Rzazade (AZE)	14
Beka Bujiashvili (GEO)	10
Guesseppe Rea (ECU)	0
Simone Piroddu (ITA)	4
Valentin Damour (FRA)	9

Quarterfinals
Roberti Dingashvili (GEO)	8
Aman Sehrawat (IND)	11
Yuto Nishiuchi (JPN)	6
Zane Richards (USA)	4
Islam Bazarganov (AZE)	0
Aliabbas Rzazade (AZE)	10
Beka Bujiashvili (GEO)	10
Valentin Damour (FRA)	0

Semifinals
Aman Sehrawat (IND)	5
Yuto Nishiuchi (JPN)	15
Aliabbas Rzazade (AZE)	4
Beka Bujiashvili (GEO)	2

Final
Yuto Nishiuchi (JPN)	0
Aliabbas Rzazade (AZE)	2

Repechage round 1
Darian Cruz (PUR)	2
Zane Richards (USA)	12
Zou Wanhao (CHN)	0
Islam Bazarganov (AZE)	1

Bronze medal match
Zane Richards (USA)	4
Aman Sehrawat (IND)	10
Islam Bazarganov (AZE)	4
Beka Bujiashvili (GEO)	4

==== Men's freestyle 61 kg ====
Legend

- F — Won by fall

Quarterfinals		Semifinals		Final
Gamzatgadzsi Halidov (HUN)	2
Daniel DeShazer (USA)	1	Gamzatgadzsi Halidov (HUN)	0
Reza Atri (IRI)	4	Reza Atri (IRI)	3
Shota Phartenadze (GEO)	3			Reza Atri (IRI)	11^{F}
Emrah Ormanoğlu (TUR)	5			Narmandakhyn Narankhuu (MGL)	3
Pankaj Malik (IND)	2	Emrah Ormanoğlu (TUR)	4
Narmandakhyn Narankhuu (MGL)	10	Narmandakhyn Narankhuu (MGL)	4
Adam Biboulatov (FRA)	0

Bronze medal match
Shota Phartenadze (GEO)	2
Gamzatgadzsi Halidov (HUN)	8
Adam Biboulatov (FRA)	0
Emrah Ormanoğlu (TUR)	10

==== Men's freestyle 65 kg ====
Legend

- F — Won by fall

Round of 32
	Score	
Ryoma Anraku (JPN)	4–3	Khamzat Arsamerzouev (FRA)
Quentin Sticker (FRA)	7–1	Edemi Bolkvadze (GEO)

Round of 16
Mikyay Naim (BUL)	3
Kaiji Ogino (JPN)	11
Ryoma Anraku (JPN)	2
Krzysztof Bieńkowski (POL)	1
Ali Rahimzade (AZE)	6
Eduard Grigorev (POL)	3
Joseph McKenna (USA)	10
Josh Finesilver (ISR)	0
Yuan Shaohua (CHN)	12
Evan Henderson (USA)	16^{F}
Agustín Destribats (ARG)	0
Tömör-Ochiryn Tulga (MGL)	11
Ismail Musukaev (HUN)	10
Quentin Sticker (FRA)	4
Sebastian Rivera (PUR)	2
Nick Lee (USA)	13

Quarterfinals
Kaiji Ogino (JPN)	1
Ryoma Anraku (JPN)	4
Ali Rahimzade (AZE)	0
Joseph McKenna (USA)	2^{F}
Evan Henderson (USA)	1
Tömör-Ochiryn Tulga (MGL)	12
Ismail Musukaev (HUN)	11
Nick Lee (USA)	0

Semifinals
Ryoma Anraku (JPN)	3
Joseph McKenna (USA)	4
Tömör-Ochiryn Tulga (MGL)	6
Ismail Musukaev (HUN)	2

Final
Joseph McKenna (USA)	1
Tömör-Ochiryn Tulga (MGL)	4

Repechage round 2
Josh Finesilver (ISR)	1
Ali Rahimzade (AZE)	9
Agustín Destribats (ARG)	14
Evan Henderson (USA)	15

Bronze medal match
Ali Rahimzade (AZE)	12
Ryoma Anraku (JPN)	1
Evan Henderson (USA)	10^{F}
Ismail Musukaev (HUN)	14

==== Men's freestyle 70 kg ====
Legend

- F — Won by fall

Round of 16
Benedikt Huber (AUT)	0
Tyler Berger (USA)	10
Gianluca Talamo (ITA)	0
Khadzhimurad Gadzhiyev (AZE)	10
Alec Pantaleo (USA)	10
Vishal Kaliramana (IND)	0

Quarterfinals
Enkhtuyaagiin Temüülen (MGL)	8
Tyler Berger (USA)	7
Giorgi Elbakidze (GEO)	2
Haji Aliyev (AZE)	5
Hayden Hidlay (USA)	4
Khadzhimurad Gadzhiyev (AZE)	8
Alec Pantaleo (USA)	10
Agudamu (CHN)	0

Semifinals
Enkhtuyaagiin Temüülen (MGL)	0
Haji Aliyev (AZE)	11
Khadzhimurad Gadzhiyev (AZE)	3
Alec Pantaleo (USA)	5

Final
Haji Aliyev (AZE)	2
Alec Pantaleo (USA)	5

Repechage round 1
Vishal Kaliramana (IND)	6^{F}
Agudamu (CHN)	6

Bronze medal match
Giorgi Elbakidze (GEO)	8
Enkhtuyaagiin Temüülen (MGL)	2
Vishal Kaliramana (IND)	0
Khadzhimurad Gadzhiyev (AZE)	10

==== Men's freestyle 74 kg ====
Legend

- F — Won by fall

Round of 32
	Score	
Kirin Kinoshita (JPN)	6–6	Xia Shengsong (CHN)
Younes Emami (IRI)	10–1	Kojiro Shiga (JPN)
Kamil Rybicki (POL)	0–12	Joey Lavallee (USA)
Jasmit Phulka (CAN)	0–11	Mitch Finesilver (ISR)
Dzhabrail Gadzhiev (AZE)	12–0	Krisztian Biro (ROU)

Round of 16
Thomas Gantt (USA)	1
Fazlı Eryılmaz (TUR)	3
Xia Shengsong (CHN)	3
Wurenibai Nuerlanbieke (CHN)	5
Tajmuraz Salkazanov (SVK)	0
Younes Emami (IRI)	5
Joey Lavallee (USA)	10
Emmanuel Olapade (CAN)	0
Amr Reda Hussen (EGY)	2
Murad Kuramagomedov (HUN)	5
Mitch Finesilver (ISR)	3
Miroslav Kirov (BUL)	3
Patryk Ołenczyn (POL)	0
Dzhabrail Gadzhiev (AZE)	10
Patrik Leder (CAN)	0
Jason Nolf (USA)	11

Quarterfinals
Fazlı Eryılmaz (TUR)	9
Wurenibai Nuerlanbieke (CHN)	1
Younes Emami (IRI)	7
Joey Lavallee (USA)	3
Murad Kuramagomedov (HUN)	4
Miroslav Kirov (BUL)	0
Dzhabrail Gadzhiev (AZE)	3
Jason Nolf (USA)	5

Semifinals
Fazlı Eryılmaz (TUR)	2
Younes Emami (IRI)	3
Murad Kuramagomedov (HUN)	1
Jason Nolf (USA)	2

Final
Younes Emami (IRI)	3
Jason Nolf (USA)	3

Repechage round 1
Kojiro Shiga (JPN)	10
Tajmuraz Salkazanov (SVK)	6

Repechage round 2
Kojiro Shiga (JPN)	0
Joey Lavallee (USA)	10
Patrik Leder (CAN)	2
Dzhabrail Gadzhiev (AZE)	7

Bronze medals
Joey Lavallee (USA)	4
Fazlı Eryılmaz (TUR)	6
Dzhabrail Gadzhiev (AZE)	5
Murad Kuramagomedov (HUN)	0

==== Men's freestyle 79 kg ====
Legend

- F — Won by fall
- WO — Won by walkover

Round of 16
Avtandil Kentchadze (GEO)	10
Callum McNeice (CAN)	0
Achsarbek Gulajev (SVK)	6
Simon Marchl (AUT)	2
Li Peilong (CHN)	0
Ali Savadkouhi (IRI)	10

Quarterfinals
Csaba Vida (HUN)	0
Avtandil Kentchadze (GEO)	10
Ramazan Sarı (TUR)	4
Chance Marsteller (USA)	6
Vladimeri Gamkrelidze (GEO)	3
Achsarbek Gulajev (SVK)	0
Ali Savadkouhi (IRI)	11
Saifedine Alekma (FRA)	0

Semifinals
Avtandil Kentchadze (GEO)	4
Chance Marsteller (USA)	1
Vladimeri Gamkrelidze (GEO)	1
Ali Savadkouhi (IRI)	10

Final
Avtandil Kentchadze (GEO)	1
Ali Savadkouhi (IRI)	2

Repechage round 1
Callum McNeice (CAN)	0
Csaba Vida (HUN)	4^{F}
Li Peilong (CHN)	1
Saifedine Alekma (FRA)	9

Bronze medal match
Csaba Vida (HUN)
Chance Marsteller (USA)	WO
Saifedine Alekma (FRA)	2
Vladimeri Gamkrelidze (GEO)	13

==== Men's freestyle 86 kg ====
Legend

- F — Won by fall

Round of 16
Andrew Johnson (CAN)	0
Boris Makoev (SVK)	10
Mark Hall (USA)	5
Ruslan Valiev (FRA)	3
Abubakr Abakarov (AZE)	9
Tariel Gaphrindashvili (GEO)	8
Hassan Yazdani (IRI)	10
Sebastian Jezierzański (POL)	0
Hayato Ishiguro (JPN)	10
Akhmed Aibuev (FRA)	0
Myles Amine (SMR)	7
Uri Kalashnikov (ISR)	0
Zahid Valencia (USA)	10
Benjamin Greil (AUT)	0
Sun Xiao (CHN)	2
Lin Zushen (CHN)	13

Quarterfinals
Boris Makoev (SVK)	2
Mark Hall (USA)	7
Abubakr Abakarov (AZE)	0
Hassan Yazdani (IRI)	11
Hayato Ishiguro (JPN)	2^{F}
Myles Amine (SMR)	0
Zahid Valencia (USA)	10
Lin Zushen (CHN)	9

Semifinals
Mark Hall (USA)	0
Hassan Yazdani (IRI)	10
Hayato Ishiguro (JPN)	11
Zahid Valencia (USA)	0

Final
Hassan Yazdani (IRI)	13
Hayato Ishiguro (JPN)	2

Repechage round 1
Sebastian Jezierzański (POL)	1
Abubakr Abakarov (AZE)	3
Akhmed Aibuev (FRA)	3
Myles Amine (SMR)	5

Bronze medal match
Abubakr Abakarov (AZE)	3
Mark Hall (USA)	7
Myles Amine (SMR)	0
Zahid Valencia (USA)	6

==== Men's freestyle 92 kg ====
Legend

- F — Won by fall
- WO — Won by walkover

Quarterfinals		Semifinals		Final
Miriani Maisuradze (GEO)	1
Ganbaataryn Gankhuyag (MGL)	1	Miriani Maisuradze (GEO)	10
Pruthviraj Patil (IND)	5	Pruthviraj Patil (IND)	0
Radosław Marcinkiewicz (POL)	2			Miriani Maisuradze (GEO)	3
Kollin Moore (USA)	8			Kollin Moore (USA)	4
Osman Nurmagomedov (AZE)	3	Kollin Moore (USA)	6
Adlan Viskhanov (FRA)	0	Jonathan Aiello (USA)	6
Jonathan Aiello (USA)	10

Bronze medal match
Ganbaataryn Gankhuyag (MGL)	9
Pruthviraj Patil (IND)	1
Osman Nurmagomedov (AZE)	13
Jonathan Aiello (USA)	2

==== Men's freestyle 97 kg ====
Legend

- F — Won by fall
- WO — Won by walkover

Round of 16
Ricardo Báez (ARG)	0
Habila Awusayiman (CHN)	10
İbrahim Çiftçi (TUR)	5
Ben Honis (ITA)	4
Nishan Randhawa (CAN)	0
Amir Ali Azarpira (IRI)	11
Radosław Baran (POL)	13
Richárd Végh (HUN)	1
Vladislav Baitsaev (HUN)	5
Zbigniew Baranowski (POL)	6
Magomedkhan Magomedov (AZE)	4
Kyle Snyder (USA)	7

Quarterfinals
Morgan Smith (USA)	0
Habila Awusayiman (CHN)	10
İbrahim Çiftçi (TUR)	0
Amir Ali Azarpira (IRI)	10
Radosław Baran (POL)	8
Zbigniew Baranowski (POL)	1
Kyle Snyder (USA)	12
Takashi Ishiguro (JPN)	1

Semifinals
Habila Awusayiman (CHN)	0
Amir Ali Azarpira (IRI)	10
Radosław Baran (POL)	0
Kyle Snyder (USA)	10

Final
Amir Ali Azarpira (IRI)	0
Kyle Snyder (USA)	3

Repechage round 1
Nishan Randhawa (CAN)	WO
İbrahim Çiftçi (TUR)
Magomedkhan Magomedov (AZE)	11
Takashi Ishiguro (JPN)	0

Bronze medal match
Nishan Randhawa (CAN)	4
Habila Awusayiman (CHN)	12
Magomedkhan Magomedov (AZE)	11
Radosław Baran (POL)	4

==== Men's freestyle 125 kg ====
Legend

- F — Won by fall
- R — Retired
- WO — Won by walkover

Round of 16
Giorgi Meshvildishvili (AZE)	7
Robert Baran (POL)	0
Taiki Yamamoto (JPN)	1
Georgi Ivanov (BUL)	4^{F}
Ceron Francisco (USA)	13
Jordan Wood (USA)	9
Rusidanmu Reheman (CHN)	1
Duan Benxin (CHN)	6
Dániel Ligeti (HUN)	3
Johannes Ludescher (AUT)	3
Kamil Kościółek (POL)	3
Abraham Conyedo (ITA)	1
Milán Korcsog (HUN)	0
Amir Hossein Zare (IRI)	11

Quarterfinals
Hayden Zillmer (USA)	4
Giorgi Meshvildishvili (AZE)	5
Georgi Ivanov (BUL)	6
Ceron Francisco (USA)	3
Duan Benxin (CHN)	0
Dániel Ligeti (HUN)	11
Kamil Kościółek (POL)	0
Amir Hossein Zare (IRI)	10

Semifinals
Giorgi Meshvildishvili (AZE)	14^{F}
Georgi Ivanov (BUL)	2
Dániel Ligeti (HUN)	2
Amir Hossein Zare (IRI)	9

Final
Giorgi Meshvildishvili (AZE)
Amir Hossein Zare (IRI)	WO

Repechage round 1
Robert Baran (POL)	WO
Hayden Zillmer (USA)
Milán Korcsog (HUN)	1^{R}
Kamil Kościółek (POL)	4

Bronze medal match
Robert Baran (POL)	8^{F}
Georgi Ivanov (BUL)	0
Kamil Kościółek (POL)	1
Dániel Ligeti (HUN)	8

=== Men's Greco-Roman ===
==== Men's Greco-Roman 55 kg ====
Legend

- F — Won by fall

Pos	Athlete	Pld	W	L	CP	TP	IRI	UZB	USA	MDA
1	Pouya Dadmarz (IRI)	3	3	0	10	20	—	5–3	10–2	5–2
2	Ikhtiyor Botirov (UZB)	3	2	1	9	21	1–3 VPO1	—	9–0	9–0
3	Dalton Duffield (USA)	3	1	2	6	9	1–4 VSU1	0–4 VSU	—	7–3 Fall
4	Artiom Deleanu (MDA)	3	0	3	1	5	1–3 VPO1	0–4 VSU	0–5 VFA	—

Source: Zagreb 2023

Pos	Athlete	Pld	W	L	CP	TP	ROU	IRI	IND
1	Denis Mihai (ROU)	2	1	1	0	12	—	8–0	4–4
2	Mohammad Mahdi Farid (IRI)	2	1	1	0	6	0–4 VSU	—	6–0
3	Manjeet Chahar (IND)	2	1	1	3	4	3–1 VPO1	0–3 VPO	—

Source: Zagreb 2023

Semifinals
Pouya Dadmarz (IRI)	2^{F}
Mohammad Mahdi Farid (IRI)	1
Denis Mihai (ROU)	1
Ikhtiyor Botirov (UZB)	3

Final
Pouya Dadmarz (IRI)	5
Ikhtiyor Botirov (UZB)	3
Bronze medal
Mohammad Mahdi Farid (IRI)	5
Denis Mihai (ROU)	0

==== Men's Greco-Roman 60 kg ====
Legend

- F — Won by fall
- R — Retired

Round of 32
	Score	
Mateusz Szewczuk (POL)	5–1	Léo Tudezca (FRA)
Justas Petravičius (LTU)	0–4	Nihat Mammadli (AZE)
Erik Torba (HUN)	0–8	Tan Haodong (CHN)

Round of 16
Ahmed Bagdouda (EGY)	1
Maito Kawana (JPN)	10
Mateusz Szewczuk (POL)	0
Dalton Roberts (USA)	10
Gyanender Dahiya (IND)	0
Cao Liguo (CHN)	9
Kaito Inaba (JPN)	3
Mehdi Mohsennejad (IRI)	7
Michał Tracz (POL)	3
Krisztián Kecskeméti (HUN)	7
Nihat Mammadli (AZE)	6
Murad Mammadov (AZE)	2
Răzvan Arnăut (ROU)	5
Tan Haodong (CHN)	0
Randon Miranda (USA)	0
Amir Reza Dehbozorgi (IRI)	9

Quarterfinals
Maito Kawana (JPN)	3
Dalton Roberts (USA)	2
Cao Liguo (CHN)	0
Mehdi Mohsennejad (IRI)	8
Krisztián Kecskeméti (HUN)	0
Nihat Mammadli (AZE)	8
Răzvan Arnăut (ROU)	3
Amir Reza Dehbozorgi (IRI)	2

Semifinals
Maito Kawana (JPN)	0
Mehdi Mohsennejad (IRI)	7
Nihat Mammadli (AZE)	3
Răzvan Arnăut (ROU)	3

Final
Mehdi Mohsennejad (IRI)	8
Nihat Mammadli (AZE)	0

Repechage round 1
Justas Petravičius (LTU)	5
Murad Mammadov (AZE)	1

Repechage round 2
Kaito Inaba (JPN)	5
Cao Liguo (CHN)	1
Justas Petravičius (LTU)	0^{R}
Krisztián Kecskeméti (HUN)	1

Bronze medals
Kaito Inaba (JPN)	1
Maito Kawana (JPN)	4
Krisztián Kecskeméti (HUN)	0
Răzvan Arnăut (ROU)	7

==== Men's Greco-Roman 63 kg ====
Legend

- C — Won by 3 cautions given to the opponent
- F — Won by fall

Round of 16
Aleksandrs Jurkjans (LAT)	2
Ivan Lizatović (CRO)	3
Sagar (IND)	1
Helary Mägisalu (EST)	1
Aref Hossein Mohammadi (IRI)	3
Aker Al-Obaidi (AUT)	2
Vitalie Eriomenco (MDA)	1
Iman Mohammadi (IRI)	6
Jacopo Sandron (ITA)	5
Shermukhammad Sharibjanov (UZB)	12^{F}

Quarterfinals
Sammy Jones (USA)	1
Ivan Lizatović (CRO)	3
Sagar (IND)	0
Aref Hossein Mohammadi (IRI)	6
Perica Dimitrijević (SRB)	1
Iman Mohammadi (IRI)	8^{C}
Shermukhammad Sharibjanov (UZB)	1
Taleh Mammadov (AZE)	8

Semifinals
Ivan Lizatović (CRO)	6
Aref Hossein Mohammadi (IRI)	7
Iman Mohammadi (IRI)	4
Taleh Mammadov (AZE)	4

Final
Aref Hossein Mohammadi (IRI)	2
Taleh Mammadov (AZE)	7

Repechage round 1
Aker Al-Obaidi (AUT)	7
Sagar (IND)	1

Bronze medal match
Aker Al-Obaidi (AUT)	1
Ivan Lizatović (CRO)	3
Shermukhammad Sharibjanov (UZB)	0
Iman Mohammadi (IRI)	10

==== Men's Greco-Roman 67 kg ====
Legend

- C — Won by 3 cautions given to the opponent
- F — Won by fall
- WO — Won by walkover

Round of 32
	Score	
Andreas Vetsch (SUI)	5–1	Luka Ivančić (CRO)
Husiyuetu (CHN)	3–1	Elmer Mattila (FIN)
Mihai Mihuț (ROU)	2–7 Fall	Stefan Clément (FRA)
Luis Orta (CUB)	9–1	Karanjit Singh (IND)
Mamadassa Sylla (FRA)	6–5	Abror Atabaev (UZB)
Alejandro Sancho (USA)	11–1	Domagoj Celiček (CRO)
Eito Nishida (JPN)	4–5	Michael Portmann (SUI)
Li Lei (CHN)	5–1	Tigran Galustyan (FRA)
Walihan Sailike (CHN)	3–4	Haruto Yabe (JPN)
Håvard Jørgensen (NOR)	8–0	Murat Fırat (TUR)
Reza Abbasi (IRI)	9–0	Ashu Bazard (IND)

Round of 16
~~Katsuaki Endo (JPN)~~
Andreas Vetsch (SUI)	WO
Husiyuetu (CHN)	4
Mihai Mihuț (ROU)	3
Hasrat Jafarov (AZE)	1
Luis Orta (CUB)	5
Mamadassa Sylla (FRA)	2
Danial Sohrabi (IRI)	10
Adomas Grigaliūnas (LTU)	5
Alejandro Sancho (USA)	4
Michael Portmann (SUI)	0
Li Lei (CHN)	9
Haruto Yabe (JPN)	5
Håvard Jørgensen (NOR)	6
Reza Abbasi (IRI)	8
Ádám Pohilec (HUN)	0

Quarterfinals
Andreas Vetsch (SUI)	1
Husiyuetu (CHN)	7
Luis Orta (CUB)	6
Danial Sohrabi (IRI)	2
Adomas Grigaliūnas (LTU)	12^{C}
Li Lei (CHN)	2
Håvard Jørgensen (NOR)	7
Reza Abbasi (IRI)	10

Semifinals
Husiyuetu (CHN)	13
Luis Orta (CUB)	4
Adomas Grigaliūnas (LTU)	0
Reza Abbasi (IRI)	10

Final
Husiyuetu (CHN)	5
Reza Abbasi (IRI)	2

Repechage round 1
Elmer Mattila (FIN)	8^{F}
Mihai Mihuț (ROU)	3
Ashu Bazard (IND)	8
Ádám Pohilec (HUN)	0

Repechage round 2
Elmer Mattila (FIN)	4
Andreas Vetsch (SUI)	1
Ashu Bazard (IND)	9
Håvard Jørgensen (NOR)	0

Bronze medals
Elmer Mattila (FIN)	2
Luis Orta (CUB)	4
Ashu Bazard (IND)	5
Adomas Grigaliūnas (LTU)	0

==== Men's Greco-Roman 72 kg ====
Legend

- F — Won by fall
- WO — Won by walkover

Round of 32
	Score	
Krisztofer Klányi (HUN)	1–4	Pat Smith (USA)
Valentin Petic (MDA)	0–6	Amir Abdi (IRI)
Luka Malobabić (CRO)	5–4	Britton Holmes (USA)
Tan Jian (CHN)	4–3	Kristupas Šleiva (LTU)
Roman Pacurkowski (POL)	5–3	Vilius Savickas (LTU)
Jiří Čapek (CZE)	WO	Ulvu Ganizade (AZE)
Ibrahim Ghanem (FRA)	10–2	Stefan Steigl (AUT)

Round of 16
Jamol Jumabaev (UZB)	10
Eimantas Vilimas (LTU)	0
Pat Smith (USA)	1
Sajjad Imentalab (IRI)	3
Róbert Fritsch (HUN)	3
Amir Abdi (IRI)	2
Luka Malobabić (CRO)	1
Matias Lipasti (FIN)	3
Selçuk Can (TUR)	8
Tan Jian (CHN)	0
Roman Pacurkowski (POL)	9
Ankit Gulia (IND)	0
Mateusz Bernatek (POL)	10
Jiří Čapek (CZE)	1
Ibrahim Ghanem (FRA)	10
Lovro Zurak (CRO)	1

Quarterfinals
Jamol Jumabaev (UZB)	1
Sajjad Imentalab (IRI)	6
Róbert Fritsch (HUN)	4
Matias Lipasti (FIN)	3
Selçuk Can (TUR)	5
Roman Pacurkowski (POL)	1
Mateusz Bernatek (POL)	2
Ibrahim Ghanem (FRA)	6

Semifinals
Sajjad Imentalab (IRI)	3
Róbert Fritsch (HUN)	1
Selçuk Can (TUR)	5
Ibrahim Ghanem (FRA)	2

Final
Sajjad Imentalab (IRI)	1
Selçuk Can (TUR)	3

Repechage round 2
Pat Smith (USA)	0
Jamol Jumabaev (UZB)	8
Tan Jian (CHN)	8
Roman Pacurkowski (POL)	0

Bronze medal match
Jamol Jumabaev (UZB)	8
Róbert Fritsch (HUN)	0
Tan Jian (CHN)	2
Ibrahim Ghanem (FRA)	6

==== Men's Greco-Roman 77 kg ====
Legend

- C — Won by 3 cautions given to the opponent
- F — Won by fall
- R — Retired
- WO — Won by walkover

Final
Alexandrin Guțu (MDA)	2
Mohammad Ali Geraei (IRI)	2

Round of 64
	Score	
Amin Kavianinejad (IRI)	3–0	Sanan Suleymanov (AZE)

Top half

Round of 32
Paulius Galkinas (LTU)	5
Attila Tösmagi (HUN)	5
Mikko Peltokangas (FIN)	0
Alexandrin Guțu (MDA)	6^{F}
Amin Kavianinejad (IRI)	9
Oliver Krüger (DEN)	0
Riccardo Abbrescia (ITA)	4
Patryk Bednarz (POL)	1
~~Yunus Emre Başar (TUR)~~
Sajan Bhanwal (IND)	WO
Bahejiang Halishan (CHN)	3
Exauce Mukubu (NOR)	2
Antonio Kamenjašević (CRO)	8
Fabio Dietsche (SUI)	0
Zoltán Lévai (HUN)	9
Maksym Zakharchuk (POL)	0

Round of 16
Paulius Galkinas (LTU)	1
Alexandrin Guțu (MDA)	4
Amin Kavianinejad (IRI)	2^{F}
Riccardo Abbrescia (ITA)	1
Sajan Bhanwal (IND)	3
Bahejiang Halishan (CHN)	4
Antonio Kamenjašević (CRO)	3
Zoltán Lévai (HUN)	3

Quarterfinals
Alexandrin Guțu (MDA)	4
Amin Kavianinejad (IRI)	1
Bahejiang Halishan (CHN)	4
Antonio Kamenjašević (CRO)	5

Semifinals
Alexandrin Guțu (MDA)	4
Antonio Kamenjašević (CRO)	3

Bottom half

Round of 32
Juan Sebastian Aak (NOR)	5
Mohammad Ali Geraei (IRI)	6
Luca Dariozzi (ITA)	0
Aik Mnatsakanian (BUL)	9
Božo Starčević (CRO)	4
Nao Kusaka (JPN)	1^{R}
Akseli Yli-Hannuksela (FIN)	3
Per-Anders Kure (NOR)	5
Kamal Bey (USA)	6^{R}
Lui Rui (CHN)	2
Aram Vardanyan (UZB)	9
Kodai Sakuraba (JPN)	3
Aleksa Ilić (SRB)	0
'Johnny Bur (FRA)	6
Payton Jacobson (USA)	1
Pavel Puklavec (CRO)	3

Round of 16
Mohammad Ali Geraei (IRI)	7^{C}
Aik Mnatsakanian (BUL)	0
Božo Starčević (CRO)	0
Per-Anders Kure (NOR)	8
Lui Rui (CHN)	6
Aram Vardanyan (UZB)	8
Johnny Bur (FRA)	9
Pavel Puklavec (CRO)	0

Quarterfinals
Mohammad Ali Geraei (IRI)	11
Per-Anders Kure (NOR)	0
Aram Vardanyan (UZB)	0
Johnny Bur (FRA)	5

Semifinals
Mohammad Ali Geraei (IRI)	3
Johnny Bur (FRA)	1

Repechage round 2
Mikko Peltokangas (FIN)	5
Paulius Galkinas (LTU)	0
Juan Sebastian Aak (NOR)	0
Aik Mnatsakanian (BUL)	9

Repechage round 3
Amin Kavianinejad (IRI)	1
Mikko Peltokangas (FIN)	1
Aik Mnatsakanian (BUL)	5
Per-Anders Kure (NOR)	0

Bronze medals
Amin Kavianinejad (IRI)	3
Antonio Kamenjašević (CRO)	0
Aik Mnatsakanian (BUL)	1
Johnny Bur (FRA)	1

==== Men's Greco-Roman 82 kg ====
Legend

- F — Won by fall

Round of 16
Spencer Woods (USA)	0
Filip Šačić (CRO)	3
Pejman Poshtam (IRI)	9
Tunjay Vazirzade (AZE)	0

Quarterfinals
Jonni Sarkkinen (FIN)	3
Filip Šačić (CRO)	6
Péter Dömök (HUN)	3
Mukhammadkodir Rasulov (UZB)	3
Marcel Hein (DEN)	0
Alireza Mohmadi (IRI)	9
Pejman Poshtam (IRI)	9
Ivo Švígler (CZE)	0

Semifinals
Filip Šačić (CRO)	8
Péter Dömök (HUN)	0
Alireza Mohmadi (IRI)	3
Pejman Poshtam (IRI)	3

Final
Filip Šačić (CRO)	1
Alireza Mohmadi (IRI)	3

Repechage round 1
Spencer Woods (USA)	8
Jonni Sarkkinen (FIN)	4

Bronze medal match
Spencer Woods (USA)	2
Péter Dömök (HUN)	7
Marcel Hein (DEN)	0
Pejman Poshtam (IRI)	8

==== Men's Greco-Roman 87 kg ====
Legend

- F — Won by fall
- R — Retired
- WO — Won by walkover

Final
István Takács (HUN)	4
Nasser Alizadeh (IRI)	1

Round of 64
	Score	
Matej Mandić (CRO)	1–2 Fall	Mahammad Ahmadiyev (AZE)

Top half

Round of 32
Turpal Bisultanov (DEN)	1
István Takács (HUN)	1
So Sakabe (JPN)	1
Hamidreza Badkan (IRI)	5
Mahammad Ahmadiyev (AZE)	4
Wang Chengwu (CHN)	0
Marcel Sterkenburg (NED)	8
Martynas Nemsevičius (LTU)	0
Dávid Losonczi (HUN)	6
Ramon Betschart (SUI)	2
~~Burhan Akbudak (TUR)~~
Sunil Kumar (IND)	WO
Masato Sumi (JPN)	4
Semen Novikov (BUL)	8
Damian von Euw (SUI)	5
Islam Abbasov (AZE)	7

Round of 16
István Takács (HUN)	2
Hamidreza Badkan (IRI)	1
Mahammad Ahmadiyev (AZE)	1
Marcel Sterkenburg (NED)	3
Dávid Losonczi (HUN)	3
Sunil Kumar (IND)	2
Semen Novikov (BUL)	8
Islam Abbasov (AZE)	0

Quarterfinals
István Takács (HUN)	3
Marcel Sterkenburg (NED)	1
Dávid Losonczi (HUN)	7
Semen Novikov (BUL)	5

Semifinals
István Takács (HUN)	5
Dávid Losonczi (HUN)	4

Bottom half

Round of 32
Yang Yi (CHN)	3
Žarko Dickov (SRB)	2^{F}
Lukas Staudacher (AUT)	0
Ivan Huklek (CRO)	9
Kaisaier Maimaiti (CHN)	0
Nasser Alizadeh (IRI)	4
Nurbek Khashimbekov (UZB)	2
Szymon Szymonowicz (POL)	5
Jalgasbay Berdimuratov (UZB)	9
Michael Wagner (AUT)	0
Alan Vera (USA)	0^{R}
Erik Szilvássy (HUN)	5
Waltteri Latvala (FIN)	2
Mirco Minguzzi (ITA)	12
~~Ali Cengiz (TUR)~~
Vjekoslav Luburić (CRO)	WO

Round of 16
Žarko Dickov (SRB)	3
Ivan Huklek (CRO)	7^{F}
Nasser Alizadeh (IRI)	1
Szymon Szymonowicz (POL)	1
Jalgasbay Berdimuratov (UZB)	3
Erik Szilvássy (HUN)	3
Mirco Minguzzi (ITA)	1
Vjekoslav Luburić (CRO)	3

Quarterfinals
Ivan Huklek (CRO)	2
Nasser Alizadeh (IRI)	7
Jalgasbay Berdimuratov (UZB)	3
Vjekoslav Luburić (CRO)	2

Semifinals
Nasser Alizadeh (IRI)	5
Jalgasbay Berdimuratov (UZB)	0

Repechage round 2
Turpal Bisultanov (DEN)	11
Hamidreza Badkan (IRI)	0
Kaisaier Maimaiti (CHN)	1
Szymon Szymonowicz (POL)	2

Repechage round 3
Turpal Bisultanov (DEN)	2
Marcel Sterkenburg (NED)	0
Szymon Szymonowicz (POL)	2
Ivan Huklek (CRO)	3

Bronze medals
Turpal Bisultanov (DEN)	9
Dávid Losonczi (HUN)	0
Ivan Huklek (CRO)	8
Jalgasbay Berdimuratov (UZB)	0

==== Men's Greco-Roman 97 kg ====
Legend

- F — Won by fall
- R — Retired
- WO — Won by walkover

Round of 32
	Score	
Daniel Gastl (AUT)	2–1	Alex Szőke (HUN)
Tyrone Sterkenburg (NED)	4–1	Liu Yan (CHN)
Yuta Nara (JPN)	4–1	Filip Smetko (CRO)
Zamir Magomedov (AZE)	4–2	Mindaugas Venckaitis (LTU)
Markus Ragginger (AUT)	0–5	Felix Baldauf (NOR)
Nikoloz Kakhelashvili (ITA)	14–4	Luka Katić (SRB)
Tamás Lévai (HUN)	4–1 Fall	Vilius Laurinaitis (LTU)
Mario Vuković (SRB)	0–9	Rustam Assakalov (UZB)
Narinder Cheema (IND)	1–7	Loïc Samen (FRA)
Mikheil Kajaia (SRB)	8–3	Kristián Lukáč (CRO)
Vinko Prodanović (CRO)	6–1	Li Yiming (CHN)
Murat Lokyaev (AZE)	1–10	Kiril Milov (BUL)
Gerard Kurniczak (POL)	3–0	Lucas Sheridan (USA)

Round of 16
Artur Omarov (CZE)	1
Daniel Gastl (AUT)	3
Tyrone Sterkenburg (NED)	4^{F}
Yuta Nara (JPN)	2
Zamir Magomedov (AZE)	0
Felix Baldauf (NOR)	8
Nikoloz Kakhelashvili (ITA)	1^{R}
Tamás Lévai (HUN)	4
Nicu Ojog (ROU)	5
Rustam Assakalov (UZB)	6
Loïc Samen (FRA)	0
Mikheil Kajaia (SRB)	9
Vinko Prodanović (CRO)	0
Kiril Milov (BUL)	9
Gerard Kurniczak (POL)	0
Arif Niftullayev (AZE)	3

Quarterfinals
Daniel Gastl (AUT)	1
Tyrone Sterkenburg (NED)	5
Felix Baldauf (NOR)	1
Tamás Lévai (HUN)	3^{F}
Rustam Assakalov (UZB)	0
Mikheil Kajaia (SRB)	8
Kiril Milov (BUL)	5
Arif Niftullayev (AZE)	1

Semifinals
Tyrone Sterkenburg (NED)	3
Tamás Lévai (HUN)	3
Mikheil Kajaia (SRB)
Kiril Milov (BUL)	WO

Final
Tamás Lévai (HUN)	2
Kiril Milov (BUL)	10

Repechage round 1
Vilius Laurinaitis (LTU)	WO
Nikoloz Kakhelashvili (ITA)
Murat Lokyaev (AZE)	9
Vinko Prodanović (CRO)	0

Repechage round 2
Vilius Laurinaitis (LTU)	0
Felix Baldauf (NOR)	4
Murat Lokyaev (AZE)	10
Arif Niftullayev (AZE)	2

Bronze medals
Felix Baldauf (NOR)	4
Tyrone Sterkenburg (NED)	5
Murat Lokyaev (AZE)	WO
Mikheil Kajaia (SRB)

==== Men's Greco-Roman 130 kg ====
Legend

- F — Won by fall

Round of 32
	Score	
Danila Sotnikov (ITA)	4–0	Sabah Shariati (AZE)
Elias Kuosmanen (FIN)	3–1	Rafał Krajewski (POL)
Alin Alexuc-Ciurariu (ROU)	5–2	Tanner Farmer (USA)
Dáriusz Vitek (HUN)	5–5 Fall	Meng Lingzhe (CHN)

Round of 16
Romas Fridrikas (LTU)	0
Amir Ghasemi Monjazi (IRI)	2
Danila Sotnikov (ITA)	2
Ali Akbar Yousefi (IRI)	3
Mantas Knystautas (LTU)	1
Elias Kuosmanen (FIN)	3
Temurbek Nasimov (UZB)	0
Óscar Pino (CUB)	8
Sota Okumura (JPN)	0
Marcel Albini (CZE)	9
Alin Alexuc-Ciurariu (ROU)	1
Oskar Marvik (NOR)	7
Sarkhan Mammadov (AZE)	4
Meng Lingzhe (CHN)	7
Delian Alishahi (SUI)	0
Beka Kandelaki (AZE)	9

Quarterfinals
Amir Ghasemi Monjazi (IRI)	2
Ali Akbar Yousefi (IRI)	1
Elias Kuosmanen (FIN)	0
Óscar Pino (CUB)	8
Marcel Albini (CZE)	1
Oskar Marvik (NOR)	11
Meng Lingzhe (CHN)	3
Beka Kandelaki (AZE)	1

Semifinals
Amir Ghasemi Monjazi (IRI)	0
Óscar Pino (CUB)	8
Oskar Marvik (NOR)	3
Meng Lingzhe (CHN)	0

Final
Óscar Pino (CUB)	7
Oskar Marvik (NOR)	1

Repechage round 2
Temurbek Nasimov (UZB)	1
Elias Kuosmanen (FIN)	7
Alin Alexuc-Ciurariu (ROU)	8
Marcel Albini (CZE)	0

Bronze medal match
Elias Kuosmanen (FIN)	1
Amir Ghasemi Monjazi (IRI)	1
Alin Alexuc-Ciurariu (ROU)	1
Meng Lingzhe (CHN)	3

== See also ==
- 2023 Grand Prix Zagreb Open – Women's freestyle
