= 2022 U23 World Wrestling Championships – Men's freestyle 92 kg =

Wrestling competitions

Men's freestyle 92 kg at the 2022 U23 World Championships
- Venue: Pontevedra Municipal Sports Hall
- Dates: 22–23 October
- Competitors: 19 from 19 nations

Medalists
gold medal	Amir Hossein Firouzpour	Iran
silver medal	Jacob Cardenas	United States
bronze medal	Miriani Maisuradze	Georgia
bronze medal	Feyzullah Aktürk	Turkey

The men's freestyle 92 kg is a competition featured at the 2022 U23 World Wrestling Championships, and was held in Pontevedra, Spain on 22 and 23 October 2022. The qualification rounds were held on 22 October while medal matches were held on the 2nd day of the competition. A total of 19 wrestlers competed in this event, limited to athletes whose body weight was less than 92 kilograms.

This freestyle wrestling competition consists of a single-elimination tournament, with a repechage used to determine the winner of two bronze medals. The two finalists face off for gold and silver medals. Each wrestler who loses to one of the two finalists moves into the repechage, culminating in a pair of bronze medal matches featuring the semifinal losers each facing the remaining repechage opponent from their half of the bracket.

== Results ==
Legend

- F — Won by fall

=== Final ===
Final
Jacob Cardenas (USA)	0
Amir Hossein Firouzpour (IRI)	10

=== Top half ===
Round of 32
Miriani Maisuradze (GEO)	9
Ion Demian (MDA)	1

Round of 16
Krisztián Angyal (HUN)	3
Sergey Sargsyan (ARM)	10
Miriani Maisuradze (GEO)	9
Ilia Hristov (BUL)	0
Baisal Kubatov (KGZ)	2^{F}
Aimar Alzón (ESP)	4
Denys Sahaliuk (UKR)	0
Jacob Cardenas (USA)	4

Quarterfinals
Sergey Sargsyan (ARM)	8
Miriani Maisuradze (GEO)	16
Baisal Kubatov (KGZ)	2
Jacob Cardenas (USA)	7

Semifinals
Miriani Maisuradze (GEO)	0
Jacob Cardenas (USA)	8

=== Bottom half ===
Round of 32
Machiel Grobler (RSA)	0
Gkivi Bliatze (GRE)	12
Amir Hossein Firouzpour (IRI)	11
Rizabek Aitmukhan (KAZ)	2

Round of 16
Feyzullah Aktürk (TUR)	10
Johannes Mayer (GER)	0
Gkivi Bliatze (GRE)	9
Hikaru Abe (JPN)	2
Adlan Viskhanov (FRA)	1
Amir Hossein Firouzpour (IRI)	11
Osmans Dzaseževs (LAT)	2
Tejvir Boal (CAN)	8

Quarterfinals
Feyzullah Aktürk (TUR)	10
Gkivi Bliatze (GRE)	0
Amir Hossein Firouzpour (IRI)	12
Tejvir Boal (CAN)	0

Semifinals
Feyzullah Aktürk (TUR)	6
Amir Hossein Firouzpour (IRI)	17

=== Repechage ===
Repechage round 1
Rizabek Aitmukhan (KAZ)	5
Adlan Viskhanov (FRA)	0

Repechage round 2
Denys Sahaliuk (UKR)	2
Baisal Kubatov (KGZ)	1
Rizabek Aitmukhan (KAZ)	11
Tejvir Boal (CAN)	0

Bronze medals
Denys Sahaliuk (UKR)	3
Miriani Maisuradze (GEO)	5
Rizabek Aitmukhan (KAZ)	3
Feyzullah Aktürk (TUR)	14

== Final standing ==
Rank	Athlete
1st place, gold medalist(s)	Amir Hossein Firouzpour (IRI)
2nd place, silver medalist(s)	Jacob Cardenas (USA)
3rd place, bronze medalist(s)	Miriani Maisuradze (GEO)
3rd place, bronze medalist(s)	Feyzullah Aktürk (TUR)
5	Denys Sahaliuk (UKR)
5	Rizabek Aitmukhan (KAZ)
7	Baisal Kubatov (KGZ)
8	Gkivi Bliatze (GRE)
9	Sergey Sargsyan (ARM)
10	Tejvir Boal (CAN)
11	Krisztián Angyal (HUN)
12	Osmans Dzaseževs (LAT)
13	Hikaru Abe (JPN)
14	Ion Demian (MDA)
15	Adlan Viskhanov (FRA)
16	Aimar Alzón (ESP)
17	Ilia Hristov (BUL)
18	Johannes Mayer (GER)
19	Machiel Grobler (RSA)
