= 2025 World Wrestling Championships – Men's freestyle 92 kg =

Wrestling competitions

Men's freestyle 92 kg at the 2025 World Championships
- Venue: Arena Zagreb
- Dates: 14–15 September 2025
- Competitors: 26 from 24 nations

Medalists
| gold medal | Trent Hidlay | United States |
| silver medal | Amanula Gadzhimagomedov |
| bronze medal | Osman Nurmagomedov | Azerbaijan |
| bronze medal | Amir Hossein Firouzpour | Iran |

The men's freestyle 92 kilograms is a competition featured at the 2025 World Wrestling Championships, and was held in Zagreb, Croatia on 14 and 15 September 2025.

This freestyle wrestling competition consists of a single-elimination tournament, with a repechage used to determine the winner of two bronze medals. The two finalists face off for gold and silver medals. Each wrestler who loses to one of the two finalists moves into the repechage, culminating in a pair of bronze medal matches, featuring the semifinal losers each facing the remaining repechage opponent from their half of the bracket.

== Results ==
Legend

- F — Won by fall
- R — Retired

=== Final ===
| Final |
| Trent Hidlay (USA) | 13 |
| Amanula Gadzhimagomedov (UWW) | 10 |

=== Top half ===
Round of 32
Takashi Ishiguro (JPN) | 1
Magomed Sharipov (BRN) | 3
Samuel Scherrer (SUI) | 5
Andrew Johnson (CAN) | 0
Redjep Hajdari (MKD) | 1
Trent Hidlay (USA) | 11
Tömörbaataryn Demchigdorj (MGL) | 2
Ivan Chornohuz (UKR) | 12
Benjamin Greil (AUT) | 1
Deepak Punia (IND) | 6

Round of 16
Miriani Maisuradze (GEO) | 2
Magomed Sharipov (BRN) | 1
Samuel Scherrer (SUI) | 0
Trent Hidlay (USA) | 10
Dauren Kurugliev (GRE) | 3
Ivan Chornohuz (UKR) | 2
Deepak Punia (IND) | 3
Osman Nurmagomedov (AZE) | 4

Quarterfinals
Miriani Maisuradze (GEO) | 1
Trent Hidlay (USA) | 6
Dauren Kurugliev (GRE) | 0^{R}
Osman Nurmagomedov (AZE) | 2

Semifinals
Trent Hidlay (USA) | 15
Osman Nurmagomedov (AZE) | 4

=== Bottom half ===
Round of 32
Kim Gwan-uk (KOR) | 6
Andrian Grosul (MDA) | 4
Akhmed Bataev (BUL) | 6
Yaraslau Iadkouski (UWW) | 0
Lars Schäfle (GER) | 2
Uri Kalashnikov (ISR) | 4
Kamil Kurugliyev (KAZ) | 10
Ze Hua (CHN) | 0
Alperen Tokgöz (TUR) | 3
Amanula Gadzhimagomedov (UWW) | 9

Round of 16
Batyrbek Tsakulov (SVK) | 12
Kim Gwan-uk (KOR) | 0
Akhmed Bataev (BUL) | 0
Amir Hossein Firouzpour (IRI) | 7
Uri Kalashnikov (ISR) | 0
Kamil Kurugliyev (KAZ) | 8
Amanula Gadzhimagomedov (UWW) | 5
Ben Honis (ITA) | 3

Quarterfinals
Batyrbek Tsakulov (SVK) | 2
Amir Hossein Firouzpour (IRI) | 7
Kamil Kurugliyev (KAZ) | 0
Amanula Gadzhimagomedov (UWW) | 9

Semifinals
Amir Hossein Firouzpour (IRI) | 6
Amanula Gadzhimagomedov (UWW) | 11

=== Repechage ===
Repechage round 1
Redjep Hajdari (MKD) | 2
Samuel Scherrer (SUI) | 4
Alperen Tokgöz (TUR) | 4
Ben Honis (ITA) | 7

Repechage round 2
Samuel Scherrer (SUI) | 1
Miriani Maisuradze (GEO) | 4
Ben Honis (ITA) | 3
Kamil Kurugliyev (KAZ) | 4

Bronze medals
Miriani Maisuradze (GEO) | 1
Osman Nurmagomedov (AZE) | 5
Kamil Kurugliyev (KAZ) | 0
Amir Hossein Firouzpour (IRI) | 4^{F}

== Final standing ==
| Rank | Athlete |
|---|---|
| 1st place, gold medalist(s) | Trent Hidlay (USA) |
| 2nd place, silver medalist(s) | Amanula Gadzhimagomedov (UWW) |
| 3rd place, bronze medalist(s) | Osman Nurmagomedov (AZE) |
| 3rd place, bronze medalist(s) | Amir Hossein Firouzpour (IRI) |
| 5 | Miriani Maisuradze (GEO) |
| 5 | Kamil Kurugliyev (KAZ) |
| 7 | Samuel Scherrer (SUI) |
| 8 | Ivan Chornohuz (UKR) |
| 9 | Batyrbek Tsakulov (SVK) |
| 10 | Ben Honis (ITA) |
| 11 | Deepak Punia (IND) |
| 12 | Magomed Sharipov (BRN) |
| 13 | Akhmed Bataev (BUL) |
| 14 | Kim Gwan-uk (KOR) |
| 15 | Uri Kalashnikov (ISR) |
| 16 | Dauren Kurugliev (GRE) |
| 17 | Alperen Tokgöz (TUR) |
| 18 | Redjep Hajdari (MKD) |
| 19 | Andrian Grosul (MDA) |
| 20 | Lars Schäfle (GER) |
| 21 | Tömörbaataryn Demchigdorj (MGL) |
| 22 | Takashi Ishiguro (JPN) |
| 23 | Benjamin Greil (AUT) |
| 24 | Andrew Johnson (CAN) |
| 25 | Yaraslau Iadkouski (UWW) |
| 26 | Ze Hua (CHN) |
