= Virtual Immortality – God, Evolution, and the Singularity in Post- and Transhumanism =

2021 book by Oliver Krüger

- Cover
- Author: Oliver Krüger
- Series: Cultures of Society
- Publisher: transcript publishing
- Publication date: October 2021 (English edition, adapted from the 2019 second revised German edition; first German edition 2004)
- Pages: 356
- ISBN: 9783837650594

Virtual Immortality – God, Evolution, and the Singularity in Post- and Transhumanism is a study by German religious scholar Oliver Krüger. Krüger traces the origins, context, and central themes of post- and transhumanist ideas. Published by transcript, and part of its Cultures of Society series, the book covers thinkers such as Ray Kurzweil, Nick Bostrom, and Frank Tipler, who envision humanity's replacement by artificial successors and a future marked by digital immortality. Krüger situates these visions in broader philosophical, religious, and cultural frameworks, with attention to historical arguments about evolution, cosmic expansion, and superintelligence.

== Summary ==
The book is a scholarly examination of how notions of immortality, human enhancement, and emerging technologies intersect with long-standing cultural and religious ideas about progress and salvation. Originally published in German and later revised for an English edition, the book analyzes how central figures in post- and transhumanist thought—among them Hans Moravec, Marvin Minsky, Frank Tipler, and Ray Kurzweil—envision a future in which technology fundamentally transforms or transcends the biological human condition.

In its first major section, the book Krüger investigates the concept of virtuality and the ways media alter perceptions of space, time, and embodiment. Chapter 2 provides a theoretical framework for "virtuality," discussing how simulated or computer-generated representations can create experiences that challenge conventional notions of reality. In Chapter 3, the author introduces "Promethean Shame," a concept by Günther Anders describing a sense of human inferiority when confronted with the seeming perfection and durability of advanced technologies.

The second section shifts focus toward the development, history, and core ideas of transhumanism and technological posthumanism. Chapter 4 traces the emergence of transhumanism as a term (derived from Dante’s Paradiso) and as a social movement, considering early advocates such as Robert Ettinger, Timothy Leary and FM-2023 and their ideas about extending human lifespans or cognitive capacities. Chapter 5 turns to "technological posthumanism," studying thinkers who posit that humanity will eventually upload consciousness into machines or otherwise merge with artificial intelligence. Chapter 6 places these ideas in a wider history of thought: it reviews philosophical and scientific paradigms spanning from Enlightenment notions of progress and evolution to modern concepts of entropy, singularity, and cosmic destiny. Subjects like eugenics, space colonization, and cosmological theories by Jesuit thinker Teilhard de Chardin of an ultimate "Omega Point" are also covered in the sixth chapter. In Chapter 7, the author returns to the theme of virtuality. He analyzes how digital media and new technologies might further reshape notions of mortality and the self. The final section also addresses the economic dimensions of "selling the future" by the advocates of transhumanism: "The future never dies – instead, it proves to be an inexhaustible and very profitable resource." (p. 295).

Krüger situates present-day post- and transhumanist movements in a broader intellectual landscape, underscoring how visions of radical technological evolution often integrate elements from secular progress narratives, Christian eschatology, and other religious or philosophical traditions. An appendix and comprehensive bibliography conclude the volume. The work as a whole proposes that, while emerging technologies have spurred fresh debates on overcoming human limitations, many of the core ideas behind these debates trace back to older cultural, theological, and scientific frameworks.

== Reviews ==
In his review, Tobias Bieseke addressed how the book approached technical visions of transcending death by bringing together religious, philosophical, and speculative concepts. Bieseke noted that the author presented the interplay between theology and science as essential, with a particular attention to "the concept of virtuality as a fantastic space of possibility." The reviewer observed that the text set out a balanced view of post- and transhumanist theories, and that Krüger stressed both their potential appeal and their questionable assumptions.

Judith M. Bodendörfer described the book as an in-depth intellectual history and commended its revised English edition for broader relevance, and discussed its engagement with post- and transhumanist concepts through an analysis of modern ideas about progress and immortality. Bodendörfer cited the work's attention to historical reception and interpretation and noted how it uncovered religious and philosophical underpinnings that shape contemporary thought. She also remarked on the accessible, entertaining style and included a "helpful 'who is who'" of the thinkers discussed. Bodendörfer wrote: "I am convinced that it will prove to be a standard work in its field."

Czech religious scholar, Zuzana Marie Kostićová, described the book as an interesting and up-to-date examination of transhumanism and posthumanism. Kostićová stressed how Krüger presented the ideas of key thinkers and traced their roots in both secular and religious contexts. She appreciated how Krüger showed that concepts like technological utopia and mind-upload had precedents stretching from Christian theology through Enlightenment thought to modern media theory. Kostićová also pointed out that while the author acknowledged the religious components in transhumanism and posthumanism, he avoided classifying them outright as a religion, instead situating them in a broader historical and philosophical framework.

Sarah Perez and Bastiaan van Rijn praised Krüger's book for its extensive coverage of trans- and posthumanist thought. Perez and van Rijn noted that Krüger presented a thorough historical and cultural context. They saw value in the comparisons drawn between posthumanism and religious concepts. They pointed out that Krüger investigated how virtuality, immortality, and technology intersect. The reviewers also mentioned that Krüger highlighted parallels to religious traditions without labeling posthumanism as a religion. Perez and van Rijn appreciated the book's critical stance on the movement's potential social and ethical blind spots.
