= 2024 U23 World Wrestling Championships – Men's freestyle 92 kg =

Wrestling competitions

Men's freestyle 92 kg at the 2024 U23 World Championships
- Venue: Tirana Olympic Park
- Dates: 25–26 October
- Competitors: 22 from 20 nations

Medalists
gold medal	Amir Hossein Firouzpour	Iran
silver medal	Jacob Cardenas	United States
bronze medal	Mustafagadzhi Malachdibirov	Authorised Neutral Athletes
bronze medal	Ion Demian	Moldova

The men's freestyle 92 kilograms is a competition featured at the 2024 U23 World Wrestling Championships, and will be held in Tirana, Albania on 25 and 26 October 2024.

This freestyle wrestling competition consists of a single-elimination tournament, with a repechage used to determine the winner of two bronze medals. The two finalists face off for gold and silver medals. Each wrestler who loses to one of the two finalists moves into the repechage, culminating in a pair of bronze medal matches featuring the semifinal losers each facing the remaining repechage opponent from their half of the bracket.

== Results ==
Legend

- F — Won by fall

=== Final ===
Final
Jacob Cardenas (USA)	4
Amir Hossein Firouzpour (IRI)	11

=== Top half ===
Round of 32
Musza Arsunkaev (HUN)	6^{F}
Bekzat Amangali (KAZ)	0
Satoshi Miura (JPN)	4
Andro Margishvili (GEO)	7
Jacob Cardenas (USA)	10
Mustafagadzhi Malachdibirov (AIN)	0

Round of 16
Denys Sahaliuk (UKR)	4
Steyn de Lange (RSA)	7
Musza Arsunkaev (HUN)	6^{F}
Aiden Stevenson (CAN)	0
Aliaksei Parkhomenka (AIN)	3
Andro Margishvili (GEO)	8
Jacob Cardenas (USA)	5
Igor Szucki (POL)	1

Quarterfinals
Steyn de Lange (RSA)	2
Musza Arsunkaev (HUN)	13
Andro Margishvili (GEO)	2
Jacob Cardenas (USA)	8^{F}

Semifinals
Musza Arsunkaev (HUN)	2
Jacob Cardenas (USA)	5

=== Bottom half ===
Round of 32
Gkivi Bliatze (GRE)	11
Dāvids Pirozniks (LAT)	0
Ion Demian (MDA)	4
Knyaz Iboyan (ARM)	1
Zhou Junpeng (CHN)	10
Sumit (IND)	0

Round of 16
Abduljalil Shabanov (AZE)	9
Gkivi Bliatze (GRE)	11
Ion Demian (MDA)	1
Amir Hossein Firouzpour (IRI)	13
Adlan Viskhanov (FRA)	13
Zhou Junpeng (CHN)	7
Sultan Kopbayev (ESP)	0
Fatih Altunbaş (TUR)	10

Quarterfinals
Gkivi Bliatze (GRE)	1
Amir Hossein Firouzpour (IRI)	3
Adlan Viskhanov (FRA)	2
Fatih Altunbaş (TUR)	7

Semifinals
Amir Hossein Firouzpour (IRI)	8
Fatih Altunbaş (TUR)	2

=== Repechage ===
Repechage round 1
Mustafagadzhi Malachdibirov (AIN)	10
Igor Szucki (POL)	0

Repechage round 2
Mustafagadzhi Malachdibirov (AIN)	10
Andro Margishvili (GEO)	0
Ion Demian (MDA)	5
Gkivi Bliatze (GRE)	3

Bronze medals
Mustafagadzhi Malachdibirov (AIN)	10
Musza Arsunkaev (HUN)	1
Ion Demian (MDA)	8^{F}
Fatih Altunbaş (TUR)	6

== Final standing ==
Rank	Athlete
1st place, gold medalist(s)	Amir Hossein Firouzpour (IRI)
2nd place, silver medalist(s)	Jacob Cardenas (USA)
3rd place, bronze medalist(s)	Mustafagadzhi Malachdibirov (AIN)
3rd place, bronze medalist(s)	Ion Demian (MDA)
5	Musza Arsunkaev (HUN)
5	Fatih Altunbaş (TUR)
7	Gkivi Bliatze (GRE)
8	Andro Margishvili (GEO)
9	Zhou Junpeng (CHN)
10	Adlan Viskhanov (FRA)
11	Steyn de Lange (RSA)
12	Abduljalil Shabanov (AZE)
13	Denys Sahaliuk (UKR)
14	Satoshi Miura (JPN)
15	Aliaksei Parkhomenka (AIN)
16	Knyaz Iboyan (ARM)
17	Igor Szucki (POL)
18	Bekzat Amangali (KAZ)
19	Aiden Stevenson (CAN)
20	Sumit (IND)
21	Sultan Kopbayev (ESP)
22	Davids Pirozniks (LAT)
