= 2023 U23 World Wrestling Championships – Men's freestyle 92 kg =

Wrestling competitions

Men's freestyle 92 kg at the 2023 U23 World Championships
- Venue: Tirana Olympic Park
- Dates: 23–24 October
- Competitors: 20 from 17 nations

Medalists
gold medal	Muhammed Gimri	Turkey
silver medal	Ion Demian	Moldova
bronze medal	Jacob Cardenas	United States
bronze medal	Abduljalil Shabanov	Azerbaijan

The men's freestyle 92 kg is a competition featured at the 2023 U23 World Wrestling Championships, and was held in Tirana, Albania on 23 and 24 October 2023.

This freestyle wrestling competition consists of a single-elimination tournament, with a repechage used to determine the winner of two bronze medals. The two finalists face off for gold and silver medals. Each wrestler who loses to one of the two finalists moves into the repechage, culminating in a pair of bronze medal matches featuring the semifinal losers each facing the remaining repechage opponent from their half of the bracket.

== Results ==
Legend

- F — Won by fall

=== Final ===
Final
Muhammed Gimri (TUR)	4
Ion Demian (MDA)	3

=== Top half ===
Round of 32
Gkivi Bliatze (GRE)	4
Alan Bagaev (ANA)	8
Pruthviraj Patil (UWW)	2
Knyaz Iboyan (ARM)	0

Round of 16
Satoshi Miura (JPN)	4
Muhammed Gimri (TUR)	12
Alan Bagaev (ANA)	3
Jacob Cardenas (USA)	4
Jairo Rivera (PUR)	4
Pruthviraj Patil (UWW)	15
Sam Pereira (CAN)	0
Adlan Viskhanov (FRA)	11

Quarterfinals
Muhammed Gimri (TUR)	10
Jacob Cardenas (USA)	1
Pruthviraj Patil (UWW)	9
Adlan Viskhanov (FRA)	6

Semifinals
Muhammed Gimri (TUR)	8
Pruthviraj Patil (UWW)	5

=== Bottom half ===
Round of 32
Abdulkareem Abuidaij (JOR)	4^{F}
Arjan Danaj (ALB)	1
Ion Demian (MDA)	14
Denys Sahaliuk (UKR)	3

Round of 16
Yaraslau Iadkouski (ANA)	4
Kanybek Abdulkhairov (KGZ)	2
Abdulkareem Abuidaij (JOR)	0
Andro Margishvili (GEO)	12
Nurdaulet Bekenov (KAZ)	6
Ion Demian (MDA)	12
Redjep Hajdari (MKD)	1
Abduljalil Shabanov (AZE)	4

Quarterfinals
Yaraslau Iadkouski (ANA)	3
Andro Margishvili (GEO)	11
Ion Demian (MDA)	12
Abduljalil Shabanov (AZE)	2

Semifinals
Andro Margishvili (GEO)	1
Ion Demian (MDA)	11

=== Repechage ===
Repechage round 1
Denys Sahaliuk (UKR)	1
Nurdaulet Bekenov (KAZ)	1

Repechage round 2
Satoshi Miura (JPN)	0
Jacob Cardenas (USA)	6
Nurdaulet Bekenov (KAZ)	0
Abduljalil Shabanov (AZE)	10

Bronze medals
Jacob Cardenas (USA)	4
Pruthviraj Patil (UWW)	3
Abduljalil Shabanov (AZE)	14
Andro Margishvili (GEO)	11
