= Khadzhimurad Gadzhiyev =

Azerbaijani freestyle wrestler

Personal information
- Native name: Хаджимурад Гаджиев
- Nationality: Azerbaijan
- Born: 12 October 2000 (age 25) Argvani, Dagestan, Russia
- Height: 180 cm (5 ft 11 in)

Sport
- Country: Azerbaijan
- Sport: Wrestling
- Weight class: 74 kg
- Event: Freestyle
Medal record
Men's freestyle wrestling
Representing Azerbaijan
European Games
Bronze medal – third place	2019 Minsk	74 kg
Yasar Dogu Tournament
Bronze medal – third place	2020 Istanbul	74 kg
Grand Prix
Gold medal – first place	2019 Kermanshah	74 kg
Bronze medal – third place	2019 Yakutsk	74 kg
Bronze medal – third place	2021 Warsaw	74 kg
Bronze medal – third place	2021 Nice	74 kg
Bronze medal – third place	2022 Rome	74 kg
Bronze medal – third place	2023 Zagreb	70 kg
Bronze medal – third place	2023 Bishkek	74 kg
Bronze medal – third place	2023 Warsaw	74 kg
World U23 Championships
Silver medal – second place	2022 Pontevedra	74 kg
World Junior Championships
Gold medal – first place	2018 Trnava	70 kg
Bronze medal – third place	2019 Tallinn	74 kg
European Juniors Championships
Silver medal – second place	2018 Rome	70 kg
World Cadets Championships
Silver medal – second place	2017 Athens	63 kg
European Cadets Championships
Silver medal – second place	2017 Sarajevo	63 kg
Bronze medal – third place	2016 Stockholm	63 kg

Khadzhimurad Gadzhiyev (born 12 October 2000) is an Azerbaijani freestyle wrestler. He won one of the bronze medals in the men's 74 kg event at the 2019 European Games held in Minsk, Belarus.

In March 2021, he qualified at the European Qualification Tournament to compete at the 2020 Summer Olympics in Tokyo, Japan. In June 2021, he won one of the bronze medals in the men's 74 kg event at the 2021 Waclaw Ziolkowski Memorial held in Warsaw, Poland.

He was not able to compete at the 2020 Summer Olympics due to injury and, instead, Turan Bayramov represented Azerbaijan in the men's 74 kg event.

In 2022, he won one of the bronze medals in his event at the Matteo Pellicone Ranking Series 2022 held in Rome, Italy.
