= Mohammad Sadegh Firouzpour =

Iranian freestyle wrestler

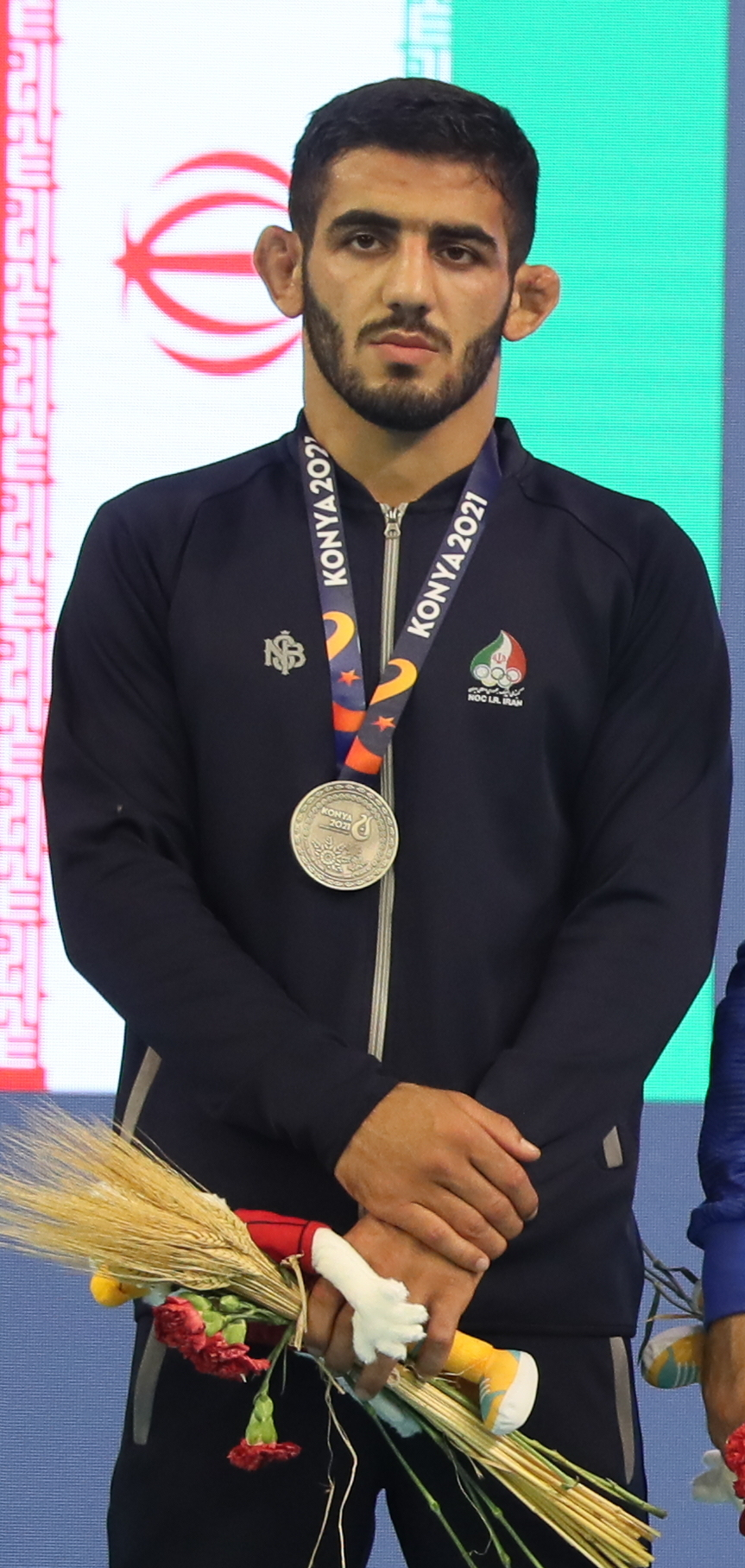
- Mohammad Sadegh at 2021 Islamic Solidarity Games

Personal information
- Native name: محمدصادق فیروزپور
- Full name: Mohammad Sadegh Firouzpour Bandpey
- Nationality: Iranian
- Born: Juybar, Mazadaran, Iran

Sport
- Country: Iran
- Sport: Wrestling
- Weight class: 74 kg
- Event: Freestyle
Medal record
Men's Freestyle wrestling
Representing Iran
World Cup
Silver medal – second place	2022 Coralville	Team
World U23 Championships
Gold medal – first place	2022 Pontevedra	74 kg
Silver medal – second place	2021 Belgrade	74 kg
Islamic Solidarity Games
Silver medal – second place	2021 Konya	74 kg

Mohammad Sadegh Firouzpour (Persian: محمدصادق فیروزپور) is an Iranian freestyle wrestler.

In 2022, Firouzpour won the silver medal in the 74 kg event at the 2021 Islamic Solidarity Games held in Konya, Turkey. He also won a gold medal at the 2022 U23 World Wrestling Championships in the category 74 kg held in Pontevedra, Spain.

His brother, Amir Hossein, is a wrestler too.
