= 2022 U23 World Wrestling Championships – Men's freestyle 97 kg =

Wrestling competitions

Men's freestyle 97 kg at the 2022 U23 World Championships
- Venue: Pontevedra Municipal Sports Hall
- Dates: 21–22 October
- Competitors: 15 from 15 nations

Medalists
gold medal	Amir Ali Azarpira	Iran
silver medal	Tanner Sloan	United States
bronze medal	Islam Ilyasov	Azerbaijan
bronze medal	Vasyl Sova	Ukraine

The men's freestyle 97 kg is a competition featured at the 2022 U23 World Wrestling Championships, and was held in Pontevedra, Spain on 21 and 22 October 2022. The qualification rounds were held on 20 October while medal matches were held on the 2nd day of the competition. A total of 15 wrestlers competed in this event, limited to athletes whose body weight was less than 97 kilograms.

This freestyle wrestling competition consists of a single-elimination tournament, with a repechage used to determine the winner of two bronze medals. The two finalists face off for gold and silver medals. Each wrestler who loses to one of the two finalists moves into the repechage, culminating in a pair of bronze medal matches featuring the semifinal losers each facing the remaining repechage opponent from their half of the bracket.

== Results ==
Legend

- F — Won by fall

=== Main bracket ===
Round of 16
Mücahit Çelik (TUR)	2
Tanner Sloan (USA)	10
Yunus Gafurov (KAZ)	12
Thomas Barns (AUS)	2
Şatlyk Hemeläýew (TKM)	0
Islam Ilyasov (AZE)	10
Radu Lefter (MDA)	6
Richárd Végh (HUN)	8
Vasyl Sova (UKR)	2
Amir Ali Azarpira (IRI)	12
Hibiki Ito (JPN)	4
Ertuğrul Ağca (GER)	5
Hovhannes Maghakyan (ARM)	10
Callum Knox (CAN)	0

Quarterfinals
Andro Margishvili (GEO)	3
Tanner Sloan (USA)	6
Yunus Gafurov (KAZ)	0
Islam Ilyasov (AZE)	4
Richárd Végh (HUN)	0
Amir Ali Azarpira (IRI)	10
Ertuğrul Ağca (GER)	10
Hovhannes Maghakyan (ARM)	0

Semifinals
Tanner Sloan (USA)	10
Islam Ilyasov (AZE)	2
Amir Ali Azarpira (IRI)	8
Ertuğrul Ağca (GER)	0

Final
Tanner Sloan (USA)	3
Amir Ali Azarpira (IRI)	5

=== Repechage ===
Repechage round
Mücahit Çelik (TUR)	0
Andro Margishvili (GEO)	10
Vasyl Sova (UKR)	10
Richárd Végh (HUN)	0

Bronze medals
Andro Margishvili (GEO)	0
Islam Ilyasov (AZE)	7
Vasyl Sova (UKR)	5
Ertuğrul Ağca (GER)	2

== Final standing ==
Rank	Athlete
1st place, gold medalist(s)	Amir Ali Azarpira (IRI)
2nd place, silver medalist(s)	Tanner Sloan (USA)
3rd place, bronze medalist(s)	Islam Ilyasov (AZE)
3rd place, bronze medalist(s)	Vasyl Sova (UKR)
5	Andro Margishvili (GEO)
5	Ertuğrul Ağca (GER)
7	Yunus Gafurov (KAZ)
8	Hovhannes Maghakyan (ARM)
9	Richárd Végh (HUN)
10	Radu Lefter (MDA)
11	Hibiki Ito (JPN)
12	Thomas Barns (AUS)
13	Mücahit Çelik (TUR)
14	Şatlyk Hemeläýew (TKM)
15	Callum Knox (CAN)
