= 2022 U23 World Wrestling Championships – Men's freestyle 74 kg =

Wrestling competitions

Men's freestyle 74 kg at the 2022 U23 World Championships
- Venue: Pontevedra Municipal Sports Hall
- Dates: 22–23 October
- Competitors: 26 from 26 nations

Medalists
gold medal	Mohammad Sadegh Firouzpour	Iran
silver medal	Khadzhimurad Gadzhiyev	Azerbaijan
bronze medal	Vadym Kurylenko	Ukraine
bronze medal	Vasile Diacon	Moldova

The men's freestyle 74 kg is a competition featured at the 2022 U23 World Wrestling Championships, and was held in Pontevedra, Spain on 22 and 23 October 2022. The qualification rounds were held on 22 October while medal matches were held on the 2nd day of the competition. A total of 26 wrestlers competed in this event, limited to athletes whose body weight was less than 74 kilograms.

This freestyle wrestling competition consists of a single-elimination tournament, with a repechage used to determine the winner of two bronze medals. The two finalists face off for gold and silver medals. Each wrestler who loses to one of the two finalists moves into the repechage, culminating in a pair of bronze medal matches featuring the semifinal losers each facing the remaining repechage opponent from their half of the bracket.

== Results ==
Legend

- F — Won by fall
- WO — Won by walkover

=== Final ===
Final
Mohammad Sadegh Firouzpour (IRI)	5
Khadzhimurad Gadzhiyev (AZE)	2

=== Top half ===
Round of 32
Diego Sandoval (MEX)	2
Sonny Santiago (PUR)	13
Patrik Leder (CAN)	3
Temuri Beruashvili (GEO)	6
Harry Duno (VEN)	11^{F}
Richard Schröder (GER)	0
Raul Zarbaliev (ISR)	8
Luca Finizio (ITA)	0
Atamyrat Çarlyýew (TKM)	0
Mohammad Sadegh Firouzpour (IRI)	10

Round of 16
David Carr (USA)	12
Sonny Santiago (PUR)	2
Temuri Beruashvili (GEO)	11
Harry Duno (VEN)	0
Vadym Kurylenko (UKR)	5
Raul Zarbaliev (ISR)	2
Mohammad Sadegh Firouzpour (IRI)	6
İsmet Çiftçi (TUR)	4

Quarterfinals
David Carr (USA)	3
Temuri Beruashvili (GEO)	4
Vadym Kurylenko (UKR)	0
Mohammad Sadegh Firouzpour (IRI)	4

Semifinals
Temuri Beruashvili (GEO)
Mohammad Sadegh Firouzpour (IRI)	WO

=== Bottom half ===
Round of 32
Mohamed El-Karchouh (ESP)	0
Yerkhan Bexultanov (KAZ)	10
Krisztian Biro (ROU)	6
Simon Marchl (AUT)	4
Hrayr Alikhanyan (ARM)	12
Dimitar Angelov (BUL)	1
Yuto Fukada (JPN)	10
Szymon Wojtkowski (POL)	0
Khadzhimurad Gadzhiyev (AZE)	13
Joan Serna (COL)	2

Round of 16
Vasile Diacon (MDA)	6
Yerkhan Bexultanov (KAZ)	0
Krisztian Biro (ROU)	5
Alinur Takirov (KGZ)	4
Hrayr Alikhanyan (ARM)	8
Yuto Fukada (JPN)	4
Khadzhimurad Gadzhiyev (AZE)	10
Kusumsiri Arachchilage (SRI)	0

Quarterfinals
Vasile Diacon (MDA)	6
Krisztian Biro (ROU)	2
Hrayr Alikhanyan (ARM)	2
Khadzhimurad Gadzhiyev (AZE)	4

Semifinals
Vasile Diacon (MDA)	3
Khadzhimurad Gadzhiyev (AZE)	4

=== Repechage ===
Repechage round 1
Atamyrat Çarlyýew (TKM)	1
İsmet Çiftçi (TUR)	11
Joan Serna (COL)	WO
~~Kusumsiri Arachchilage (SRI)~~

Repechage round 2
İsmet Çiftçi (TUR)	3
Vadym Kurylenko (UKR)	14^{F}
Joan Serna (COL)	0
Hrayr Alikhanyan (ARM)	10

Bronze medals
Vadym Kurylenko (UKR)	WO
Temuri Beruashvili (GEO)
Hrayr Alikhanyan (ARM)	3
Vasile Diacon (MDA)	7

== Final standing ==
Rank	Athlete
1st place, gold medalist(s)	Mohammad Sadegh Firouzpour (IRI)
2nd place, silver medalist(s)	Khadzhimurad Gadzhiyev (AZE)
3rd place, bronze medalist(s)	Vadym Kurylenko (UKR)
3rd place, bronze medalist(s)	Vasile Diacon (MDA)
5	Temuri Beruashvili (GEO)
5	Hrayr Alikhanyan (ARM)
7	Krisztian Biro (ROU)
8	Joan Serna (COL)
9	Harry Duno (VEN)
10	İsmet Çiftçi (TUR)
11	David Carr (USA)
12	Sonny Santiago (PUR)
13	Yuto Fukada (JPN)
14	Yerkhan Bexultanov (KAZ)
15	Raul Zarbaliev (ISR)
16	Alinur Takirov (KGZ)
17	Simon Marchl (AUT)
18	Patrik Leder (CAN)
19	Diego Sandoval (MEX)
20	Dimitar Angelov (BUL)
21	Atamyrat Çarlyýew (TKM)
22	Luca Finizio (ITA)
23	Mohamed El-Karchouh (ESP)
24	Szymon Wojtkowski (POL)
25	Richard Schröder (GER)
—	Kusumsiri Arachchilage (SRI)
