= 2021 U23 World Wrestling Championships – Men's freestyle 97 kg =

Wrestling Championship

The men's freestyle 97 kilograms is a competition featured at the 2021 U23 World Wrestling Championships, and was held in Belgrade, Serbia on 5 and 6 November.

== Medalists ==
Gold	Amir Ali Azarpira; Iran
Silver	Radu Lefter; Moldova
Bronze	Danylo Stasiuk; Ukraine
Bronze	Jonathan Aiello; United States

== Results ==
Legend

- F — Won by fall

=== Main bracket ===
Round of 16
Sahil Una (IND)	4
Richard DesChatelets (CAN)	1
Danylo Stasiuk (UKR)	10
Michał Bielawski (POL)	1
Yunus Gafurov (KAZ)	1
Radu Lefter (MDA)	6^{F}
Milán Korcsog (HUN)	5
Sven Engström (SWE)	1
Tsvetan Evtimov (BUL)	1
Zuriko Urtashvili (GEO)	11
Vasil Pauliuchenka (BLR)	0
Amir Ali Azarpira (IRI)	6
Islam Ilyasov (AZE)	1
Shamil Gadzhialiev (RUS)	6
Feyzullah Aktürk (TUR)	3
Jonathan Aiello (USA)	5

Quarterfinals
Sahil Una (IND)	0
Danylo Stasiuk (UKR)	6^{F}
Radu Lefter (MDA)	9
Milán Korcsog (HUN)	0
Zuriko Urtashvili (GEO)	3
Amir Ali Azarpira (IRI)	5
Shamil Gadzhialiev (RUS)	4
Jonathan Aiello (USA)	4

Semifinals
Danylo Stasiuk (UKR)	1
Radu Lefter (MDA)	4
Amir Ali Azarpira (IRI)	9
Jonathan Aiello (USA)	0

Final
Radu Lefter (MDA)	3
Amir Ali Azarpira (IRI)	7

=== Repechage ===
Repechage round 1
Yunus Gafurov (KAZ)	2
Milán Korcsog (HUN)	6
Vasil Pauliuchenka (BLR)	10
Zuriko Urtashvili (GEO)	8

Bronze medals
Milán Korcsog (HUN)	2
Danylo Stasiuk (UKR)	4
Vasil Pauliuchenka (BLR)	2
Jonathan Aiello (USA)	13
