= 2023 U23 World Wrestling Championships – Men's freestyle 97 kg =

Wrestling competitions

Men's freestyle 97 kg at the 2023 U23 World Championships
- Venue: Tirana Olympic Park
- Dates: 24–25 October
- Competitors: 17 from 14 nations

Medalists
gold medal	Isaac Trumble	United States
silver medal	Radu Lefter	Moldova
bronze medal	Sergey Kozyrev	Authorised Neutral Athletes
bronze medal	Oktay Çiftçi	Turkey

The men's freestyle 97 kg is a competition featured at the 2023 U23 World Wrestling Championships, and was held in Tirana, Albania on 24 and 25 October 2023.

This freestyle wrestling competition consists of a single-elimination tournament, with a repechage used to determine the winner of two bronze medals. The two finalists face off for gold and silver medals. Each wrestler who loses to one of the two finalists moves into the repechage, culminating in a pair of bronze medal matches featuring the semifinal losers each facing the remaining repechage opponent from their half of the bracket.

== Results ==
Legend

- F — Won by fall
- WO — Won by walkover

=== Final ===
Final
Radu Lefter (MDA)	2
Isaac Trumble (USA)	12

=== Top half ===
Round of 32
Yunus Gafurov (KAZ)	7
Richárd Végh (HUN)	3

Round of 16
Aidan Stevenson (CAN)	0
Ertuğrul Ağca (GER)	10
Yunus Gafurov (KAZ)	6
Sahil Ahlawat (UWW)	7
Adam Jakšík (SVK)	1
David Mchedlidze (UKR)	4
Radu Lefter (MDA)	8
Sergey Kozyrev (ANA)	8

Quarterfinals
Ertuğrul Ağca (GER)	7
Sahil Ahlawat (UWW)	9
David Mchedlidze (UKR)	0
Radu Lefter (MDA)	2

Semifinals
Sahil Ahlawat (UWW)	3
Radu Lefter (MDA)	6

=== Bottom half ===
Round of 32

Round of 16
Oktay Çiftçi (TUR)	10
Uladzislau Kazlou (ANA)	9
Hibiki Ito (JPN)	4
Isaac Trumble (USA)	13
Thomas Barns (AUS)	0
Sergey Sargsyan (ARM)	7
Merab Suleimanishvili (GEO)	14
Nicolaas de Lange (RSA)	10

Quarterfinals
Oktay Çiftçi (TUR)	0
Isaac Trumble (USA)	11
Sergey Sargsyan (ARM)	14
Merab Suleimanishvili (GEO)	14

Semifinals
Isaac Trumble (USA)	11
Sergey Sargsyan (ARM)	0

=== Repechage ===
Repechage round 2
Sergey Kozyrev (ANA)	7
David Mchedlidze (UKR)	0
Hibiki Ito (JPN)	6
Oktay Çiftçi (TUR)	7

Bronze medals
Sergey Kozyrev (ANA)	10
Sahil Ahlawat (UWW)	0
Oktay Çiftçi (TUR)	WO
Sergey Sargsyan (ARM)
