= Amir Hossein Firouzpour =

Iranian freestyle wrestler

Personal information
- Native name: امیرحسین فیروزپور
- Full name: Amir Hossein Firouzpour Bandpey
- Nationality: Iranian
- Born: 25 January 2002 (age 24) Juybar, Mazadaran, Iran

Sport
- Country: Iran
- Sport: Wrestling
- Weight class: 92 kg
- Event: Freestyle
Medal record
Men's Freestyle wrestling
Representing Iran
World Championships
Bronze medal – third place	2025 Zagreb	92 kg
Asian Championships
Gold medal – first place	2022 Ulaanbaatar	92 kg
Gold medal – first place	2024 Bishkek	92 kg
Gold medal – first place	2025 Amman	92 kg
World Cup
Silver medal – second place	2022 Coralville	Team
Yasar Dogu Tournament
Gold medal – first place	2021 Istanbul	86 kg
Gold medal – first place	2024 Antalya	92 kg
Grand Prix
Gold medal – first place	2025 Zagreb	92 kg
Gold medal – first place	2026 Tirana	92 kg
World U23 Championships
Gold medal – first place	2022 Pontevedra	92 kg
Gold medal – first place	2024 Tirana	92 kg
Bronze medal – third place	2021 Belgrade	92 kg
World Junior Championships
Gold medal – first place	2021 Ufa	86 kg
Gold medal – first place	2022 Sofia	92 kg
World Cadets Championships
Gold medal – first place	2019 Sofia	80 kg

Amir Hossein Firouzpour (Persian: امیرحسین فیروزپور) is an Iranian freestyle wrestler.

in 2022, Firouzpour won the gold medal in the 92 kg event at 2022 World Junior Wrestling Championships held in Sofia, Bulgaria. He won gold medal at 2022 Asian Wrestling Championships in the 92 kg event held in Ulaanbaatar, Mongolia. He also won gold medal at 2022 U23 World Wrestling Championships in category 92 kg held in Pontevedra, Spain.

His brother, Mohammad Sadegh is wrestler too.
