= Oliver Krüger =

Oliver Krüger (born 1973) is a German professor in Religious studies at the University of Fribourg (Switzerland).

From 1994 to 1999 he studied sociology, classical archaeology, and comparative religion at the University of Bonn. In 2003, he graduated there with a PhD in religious studies. His thesis was the first in-depth study of posthumanism and transhumanism that shed light on the philosophical, religious, and cultural contexts of these utopias. In 2004 the thesis was awarded by the German Association for the History of Religion.

Following his Ph.D. he worked on the significance of the Internet for the Wicca movement in a research project at the University of Heidelberg. From 2005 to 2007 Krüger served as visiting lecturer and visiting research fellow at the Center for the Study of Religion at Princeton University while exploring the alternative funeral culture in the United States, especially the Funeral Consumer's Alliance.

In 2007 Krüger was appointed to the chair for the Study of Religions (Religionswissenschaft) at Fribourg University, from 2011 to 2014 he was president of the Swiss Association for the Study of Religion. In 2012/13 he was invited as fellow to the International Centre for Advanced Studies Morphomata at the University of Cologne (Germany).

His research is focused mainly on the relation of religion and (new) media and of religion and science, especially in regard of the concepts of progress and evolution. In addition, Krüger contributes to debates on the theory of religion. In particular, he considers a paradigm shift to have taken place in the study of religions: from an Aristotelian paradigm that seeks to universally define the nature of religion to a relational paradigm that understands religion in its social, historical, and cultural contexts.

== Publications ==
=== Selected books & special issues ===
- Virtual Immortality. God, Evolution, and the Singularity in Post- and Transhumanism. Bielefeld: transcript 2021. ISBN 978-3-8376-5059-4
- Special Issue on the Dynamics of Religion, Media, and Community Online – Heidelberg Journal of Religions on the Internet 1 (14/2019), co-edited with Andrea Rota. (E-Journal)
- Die mediale Religion. Probleme und Perspektiven religionswissenschaftlicher und wissenssoziologischer Medienforschung. Reihe Religion und Medien (Band 1), transcript Verlag, Bielefeld 2012. ISBN 978-3-8376-1874-7
- Das Prinzip Evolution. Darwin und die Folgen für Religionstheorie und Philosophie [Religionsforum, Bd. 7]. Kohlhammer Verlag, Stuttgart 2010, co-edited with Mariano Delgado & Guido Vergauwen. ISBN 978-3-17-021501-6
- Special Issue on Theory and Methodology. Online – Heidelberg Journal of Religions on the Internet 1 (1/2005). (E-Journal)

=== Selected articles ===
- From an Aristotelian Ordo Essendi to Relation. Shifting Paradigms in the Study of Religions in the Light of the Sociology of Knowledge. In: Numen 69, 1-36 (2022).
- The ‘Logic’ of Mediatization Theory in Religion: A Critical Consideration of a New Paradigm. In: Marburg Journal of Religion 20/1 (2019). (Online text)
- Media. In: Oxford Handbook of the Study of Religion, ed. by Michael Stausberg & Steven Engler, Oxford University Press: Oxford, S. 382-400 (2016). ISBN 9780198729570 (Academia)
- Gaia, God, and the Internet - revisited. The History of Evolution and the Utopia of Community in Media Society. In: Online – Heidelberg Journal for Religions on the Internet 8 (2015). (Online text)
- The Suspension of Death. The Cryonic Utopia in the Context of the U.S. Funeral Culture. In: Marburg Journal of Religion 15 (2010). (Online text)
- The Price of Death. In: German Research. Magazine of the Deutsche Forschungsgemeinschaft 2/2008, p. 22-28. (Online text)
- Gnosis in Cyberspace? Body, Mind and Progress in Posthumanism. In: Journal of Technology and Evolution 2005, 18 p. (Online text)
- ‘It’s all about loving your parents.’ The Reflection of Tradition, Modernity and Rituals in Popular Indian Movies. In: Marburg Journal of Religion 9 (1/2004), 22 p. (E-Journal)
- The Internet as Distributor and Mirror of Religious and Ritual Knowledge. In: Asian Journal of Social Science 32 (2/2004), S. 183–197. (E-ISSN:1568-5314)
