= Amir Ali Azarpira =

Iranian freestyle wrestler

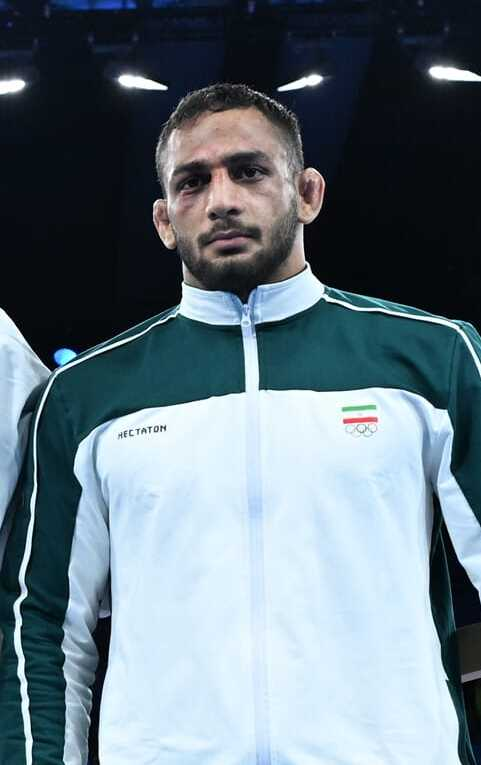
- Azarpira in 2024

Personal information
- Native name: امیرعلی آذرپیرا
- Nationality: Iran
- Born: 26 March 2002 (age 24) Tehran, Iran
- Height: 1.90 m (6 ft 3 in)
- Weight: 97 kg (214 lb)

Sport
- Country: Iran
- Sport: Freestyle wrestling
- Weight class: 97 kg
- Coached by: Hamid Azarpira
Medal record
Men's freestyle wrestling
Representing Iran
Olympic Games
Bronze medal – third place	2024 Paris	97 kg
World Championships
Silver medal – second place	2025 Zagreb	97 kg
Asian Championships
Silver medal – second place	2026 Bishkek	97 kg
Asian Games
Gold medal – first place	2026 Aichi–Nagoya	97 kg
Islamic Solidarity Games
Gold medal – first place	2025 Riyadh	97 kg
World Cup
Silver medal – second place	2022 Coralville	Team
Grand Prix
Gold medal – first place	2024 Zagreb	97 kg
Silver medal – second place	2023 Zagreb	97 kg
World U23 Championships
Gold medal – first place	2021 Belgrade	97 kg
Gold medal – first place	2022 Pontevedra	97 kg
World Junior Championship
Bronze medal – third place	2022 Sofia	97 kg
Asian Junior Championship
Gold medal – first place	2022 Manama	97 kg

Amir Ali Azarpira (Persian: امیرعلی آذرپیرا; born 26 March 2002) is an Iranian freestyle wrestler.

He won gold medal in the 97 kg event at the 2021 U23 World Wrestling Championships held in Belgrade, Serbia and a member of the Iranian national team.

and the 2022 U23 World Wrestling Championships. He also won a gold medal in the 97 kg event at the 2022 U20 Asian Wrestling Championships.

He also won one of the bronze medals in the 97 kg event at the 2024 Summer Olympics held in Paris, France.

== Professional wrestling career ==
Amir ali Azarpira became familiar with wrestling at the age of 9 through his father, Hamid Azarpira.

=== The 2021 U23 World Wrestling Championships ===
In the 97 kg event, Amir ali Azarpira defeated Vasil Poliuchanka from Belarus with a score of 5–0 in the first round. In the next round, in the quarterfinals, he defeated Zuriko Ortashvili from Georgia with a score of 5-3 and advanced to the semifinals. Azarpira won against Jonathan AIELLO from the United States with a score of 9–0 in this stage and made it to the final. In the final match, he defeated Rado Lifter, the silver medalist of the U23 European Wrestling Championships from Moldova, with a score of 7-3 and won the gold medal.

=== The 2022 U23 World Wrestling Championships ===
In the 97 kg event, Amir ali Azarpira defeated Vasyl Sova from Ukraine with a score of 12–2 in the first round and advanced to the quarterfinals. In this round, he defeated Richard Vagh from Hungary with a score of 10-0 and made it to the semifinals. Azarpira won against Ertugrul Agca from Germany with a score of 8–0 in this match and made it to the final. In the final match, he defeated Tanner Sloan from the United States with a score of 5-3 and won the gold medal.

=== The 2022 Wrestling World Cup - Men's freestyle ===
In 2022, Amir ali Azarpira was the only national wrestler in the 97 kg event to participate in this international tournament and was able to demonstrate an outstanding performance. He defeated the Japanese team with a score of 13-2 and defeated Batyrbek Tsakulov, the world's runner-up in the 2022 World Wrestling Championships in Belgrade, with a score of 10–0 in the team of World Wrestling Stars, which was formed by the United World Wrestling from the world's best wrestlers. With these excellent results, he was exempted from participating in the 1401 Iranian championship, which is the first qualifying stage for the world and Asian championships, along with Ali Savadkuhi. He is also among the national wrestlers selected to participate in the Zagreb Ranking Tournament in Croatia, which will be held from 12 to 16 February 2023.

He competed at the 2024 Asian Wrestling Olympic Qualification Tournament in Bishkek, Kyrgyzstan and he earned a quota place for Iran for the 2024 Summer Olympics in Paris, France. He won one of the bronze medals in the men's 97 kg event at the Olympics.
