= 2020 United States Olympic trials (wrestling) =

2020 U.S. Olympic Wrestling Team Trials
- Host city: (United States) Fort Worth, Texas, U.S.
- Dates: April 2–3, 2021
- Stadium: Dickies Arena

The 2020 United States Olympic Team Trials for wrestling were held at the Dickies Arena of Fort Worth, Texas, on April 2–3, 2021. This event determined the representative of the United States of America for the 2020 Summer Olympics at each Olympic weight class. Originally scheduled to take place at the Bryce Jordan Center in University Park, Pennsylvania and on April 4–5, 2020, this event was postponed by the United States Olympic & Paralympic Committee and USA Wrestling on March 13, 2020, along with the 2020 Summer Olympics due to the COVID-19 pandemic.

== Medal summary ==
=== Men's freestyle ===
Event	Gold	Silver	Bronze
57 kg	(United States) Thomas Gilman	(United States) Vitali Arujau	(United States) Nathan Tomasello
65 kg	(United States) Jordan Oliver	(United States) Joey McKenna	(United States) Nick Lee
74 kg	(United States) Kyle Dake	(United States) Jordan Burroughs	(United States) Jason Nolf
86 kg	(United States) David Taylor	(United States) Bo Nickal	(United States) Zahid Valencia
97 kg	(United States) Kyle Snyder	(United States) Kollin Moore	(United States) Kyven Gadson
125 kg	(United States) Gable Steveson	(United States) Nick Gwiazdowski	(United States) Mason Parris

=== Women's freestyle ===
Event	Gold	Silver	Bronze
50 kg	(United States) Sarah Hildebrandt	(United States) Victoria Anthony	(United States) Alyssa Lampe
53 kg	(United States) Jacarra Winchester	(United States) Ronna Heaton	(United States) Dominique Parrish
57 kg	(United States) Helen Maroulis	(United States) Jenna Burkert	(United States) Abigail Nette
62 kg	(United States) Kayla Miracle	(United States) Macey Kilty	(United States) Jennifer Page
68 kg	(United States) Tamyra Mensah-Stock	(United States) Kennedy Blades	(United States) Forrest Molinari
76 kg	(United States) Adeline Gray	(United States) Kylie Welker	(United States) Dymond Guilford

=== Men's Greco–Roman ===
Event	Gold	Silver	Bronze
60 kg	(United States) Ildar Hafizov	(United States) Ryan Mango	(United States) Leslie Fuenffinger
67 kg	(United States) Alejandro Sancho	(United States) Xavier Johnson	
77 kg	(United States) Jesse Porter	(United States) Peyton Walsh	(United States) RaVaughn Perkins
87 kg	(United States) John Stefanowicz	(United States) Joe Rau	(United States) Spencer Woods
97 kg	(United States) G'Angelo Hancock	(United States) Braxton Amos	(United States) Lucas Sheridan
130 kg	(United States) Adam Coon	(United States) Colton Schultz	(United States) Jacob Mitchell

== Qualification procedures ==
=== Direct qualification ===
To qualify for the 2020 U.S. Olympic Team Trials directly, a wrestler must have achieved a certain result at at least one of the determined qualifying tournaments (set by USA Wrestling). The procedures were the following:

==== Men's freestyle ====
Qualifying Event		Men					
Qualifying Event		Freestyle					
Qualifying Event		57 kg	65 kg	74 kg	86 kg	97 kg	125 kg
2019 U.S. Senior Nationals – Olympic Trials Qualifier	1st	Spencer Lee	Jordan Oliver	Logan Massa	Zahid Valencia	Hayden Zillmer	Dom Bradley
2019 U.S. Senior Nationals – Olympic Trials Qualifier	2nd	Nathan Tomasello	Joey McKenna	Mekhi Lewis	Myles Martin	Kollin Moore	Anthony Nelson
2019 U.S. Senior Nationals – Olympic Trials Qualifier	3rd	Vitali Arujau	Nick Lee	Thomas Gantt	Alex Dieringer	Ty Walz	Greg Kerkvliet
2019 U.S. Senior Nationals – Olympic Trials Qualifier	4th	Nick Suriano	Yianni Diakomihalis	Evan Wick	Brett Pfarr	Kyven Gadson	Nick Nevills
2019 U.S. Senior Nationals – Olympic Trials Qualifier	5th	Zach Sanders	Frank Molinaro	Anthony Valencia	Samuel Brooks	Jacob Kasper	Garrett Ryan
2020 Pan American Olympic Qualifier		Thomas Gilman	—	—	David Taylor	—	Nick Gwiazdowski
2021 U.S. Last Chance Olympic Trials Qualifier		Sean Russell	Evan Henderson	Chance Marsteller	Gabe Dean	Ben Honis	Tanner Hall
2021 U.S. Last Chance Olympic Trials Qualifier		Zane Richards	Mitchell Mckee	Vincenzo Joseph	Nate Jackson	Braxton Amos	Jordan Wood

==== Women's freestyle ====
Qualifying Event		Women					
Qualifying Event		Freestyle					
Qualifying Event		50 kg	53 kg	57 kg	62 kg	68 kg	76 kg
2019 U.S. Senior Nationals – Olympic Trials Qualifier	1st	Alyssa Lampe	Dominique Parrish	Abigail Nette	Emma Bruntil	Forrest Molinari	Precious Bell
2019 U.S. Senior Nationals – Olympic Trials Qualifier	2nd	Victoria Anthony	Areana Villaescusa	Tiana Jackson	Maya Nelson	Victoria Francis	Dymond Guilford
2019 U.S. Senior Nationals – Olympic Trials Qualifier	3rd	Amy Fearnside	Katherine Shai	Cameron Guerin	Macey Kilty	Ashlynn Ortega	Randi Beltz
2019 U.S. Senior Nationals – Olympic Trials Qualifier	4th	Emily Shilson	Alisha Howk	Shauna Kemp	Julia Salata	Ashlynn Ortega	Jessika Rottier
2019 U.S. Senior Nationals – Olympic Trials Qualifier	5th	Alleida Martinez	Ronna Heaton	Alexandra Hedrick	Jennifer Page	Nahiela Magee	Yelena Makoyed
2020 Pan American Olympic Qualifier		Sarah Hildebrandt	Jacarra Winchester	Helen Maroulis	Kayla Miracle	—	—
2021 U.S. Last Chance Olympic Trials Qualifier		Sage Mortimer	Melanie Mendoza	Xochitl Mota-Pettis	Michaela Beck	Kennedy Blades	Jackie Cataline
2021 U.S. Last Chance Olympic Trials Qualifier		Charlotte Fowler	Marissa Gallegos	Lauren Louive	Ana Luciano	Kylie Welker	Marlynne Deede

==== Greco-Roman ====
Qualifying Event		Men					
Qualifying Event		Greco–Roman					
Qualifying Event		60 kg	67 kg	77 kg	87 kg	97 kg	130 kg
2019 U.S. Senior Nationals – Olympic Trials Qualifier	1st	Leslie Fuenffinger	Alejandro Sancho	Kamal Bey	Jonathan Anderson	Daniel Miller	Cohlton Schultz
2019 U.S. Senior Nationals – Olympic Trials Qualifier	2nd	Sam Jones	Calvin Germinaro	Jake Fisher	Patrick Martinez	Lucas Sheridan	Jacob Mitchell
2019 U.S. Senior Nationals – Olympic Trials Qualifier	3rd	Taylor Lamont	Xavier Johnson	RaVaughn Perkins	Carter Nielsen	Eric Twohey	Toby Erickson
2019 U.S. Senior Nationals – Olympic Trials Qualifier	4th	Joseph Palmer	Nolan Baker	Peyton Walsh	Richard Carlson	Nicholas Boykin	West Cathcart
2019 U.S. Senior Nationals – Olympic Trials Qualifier	5th	Dalton Roberts	Jamel Johnson	Corey Hope	Barrett Stanghill	Khymba Johnson	Donny Longendyke
2020 Pan American Olympic Qualifier		Ildar Hafizov	Alejandro Sancho	—	Joe Rau	G'Angelo Hancock	—
2021 U.S. Last Chance Olympic Trials Qualifier		Travis Rice	Lenny Merkin	Austin Morrow	Alan Vera	Braxton Amos	Tanner Farmer
2021 U.S. Last Chance Olympic Trials Qualifier		Randon Miranda	Benjamin Peak	Jesse Porter	Christian Dulaney	Jacob Clark	Thomas Helton

=== Indirect qualification ===
To qualify for the 2020 U.S. Olympic Team Trials indirectly, a wrestler was required to have certain past accolades that could back up their spot. The required accomplishments were the following:

==== Men's freestyle ====
Qualifying Event	Freestyle Olympic Weight						Non-Olympic Weight	
Qualifying Event	57 kg	65 kg	74 kg	86 kg	97 kg	125 kg	—	—
2017 U.S. World Team Members	Thomas Gilman	—	—	—	—	Nick Gwiazdowski	—	—
2018 U.S. World Team Members	—	Logan Stieber	—	David Taylor	—	—	61 kg Nahshon Garrett	61 kg Joe Colon
2019 U.S. World Team Members	Daton Fix	Zain Retherford	—	Pat Downey	—	—	61 kg Tyler Graff	70 kg James Green
2019 Senior World Champions (Final Berth) (Semifinal Berth)	—	—	Jordan Burroughs	—	Kyle Snyder	—	79 kg Kyle Dake	92 kg J'den Cox
2019 Junior World Champions	—	—	David Carr	—	—	Mason Parris	—	—
2019 U23 World Champion	—	—	—	—	—	—	92 kg Bo Nickal	—
2019 Bill Farrell International Open	Seth Gross	Jordan Oliver	Isaiah Martinez	Alex Dieringer	Mike Macchiavello	Gable Steveson	—	—
2020 Pan American Championships	—	—	—	—	—	—	70 kg Anthony Ashnault	79 kg Jason Nolf

==== Women's freestyle ====
Qualifying Event	Freestyle Olympic Weight						Non-Olympic Weight	
Qualifying Event	50 kg	53 kg	57 kg	62 kg	68 kg	76 kg	—	—
2017 U.S. World Team Members	Victoria Anthony	Haley Augello	—	—	—	Victoria Francis	55 kg Becka Leathers	—
2018 USA World Champ–Participants	—	—	—	Mallory Velte	—	—	72 kg Erin Clodgo	—
2019 U.S. World Team Members	Whitney Conder	—	Jenna Burkert	—	—	—	59 kg Alli Ragan	65 kg Forrest Molinari
2019 World Champions (Final Berth) (Semifinal Berth)	Sarah Hildebrandt	Jacarra Winchester	Helen Maroulis	Kayla Miracle	Tamyra Mensah-Stock	Adeline Gray	—	—
2019 Junior World Champions	—	—	—	—	Macey Kilty	—	—	—
2019 Bill Farrell International Open	Erin Golston	Areana Villaescusa	—	—	Alexandria Glaude	—	—	—
2020 WCWA & Pan American Wrestle-Off	Esthela Trevino	Jaslynn Gallegos	Julia Vidallon	Zoe Nowicki	Morgan Norris	Mariah Harris	—	—
2020 WCWA & Pan American Wrestle-Off	Esthela Trevino	Jaslynn Gallegos	Julia Vidallon	Zoe Nowicki	Rachel Watters	Alexandra Castillo	—	—

==== Greco–Roman ====
Qualifying Event	Greco–Roman Olympic Weight						Non-Olympic Weight				
Qualifying Event	60 kg	67 kg	77 kg	87 kg	97 kg	130 kg	—	—	—	—	—
2017 U.S. World Team Members	—	—	Mason Manville	Ben Provisor	—	Robby Smith	82 kg Cheney Haight	—	—	—	—
2018 U.S. World Team Members	Dalton Roberts	—	Kamal Bey	Pat Martinez	—	—	55 kg Sam Hazewinkel	63 kg Jesse Thielke	72 kg RaVaughn Perkins	72 kg Jon Jay Chavez	82 kg Geordan Speiller
2019 U.S. World Team Members	Ryan Mango	Ellis Coleman	Pat Smith	—	—	Adam Coon	55 kg Max Nowry	72 kg Raymond Bunker	82 kg John Stefanowicz	—	—
2019 Senior World Championships (Final Berth) (Semifinal Berth)	Ildar Hafizov	Alejandro Sancho	—	Joe Rau	G'Angelo Hancock	—	—	—	—	—	—
2019 Junior World Championship medalists	—	Peyton Omania	—	—	—	Cohlton Schultz	63 kg Alston Nutter	—	—	—	—
2019 Bill Farrell International Open	Sam Jones	—	Spencer Woods	Chandler Rogers	—	Jacob Mitchell	—	—	—	—	—
2020 Armed Forces Championships	Colton Rasche	—	Brandon Mueller	Terrence Zaleski	Diante Cooper	—	72 kg Michael Hooker	82 kg Dillon Cowan	—	—	—

=== Collegiate qualification ===
These athletes have qualified for the 2020 U.S. Olympic Team Trials through collegiate wrestling.

Men's Freestyle – Greco–Roman - 2021 NCAA Division I Championships

- 125 lb Spencer Lee
- 133 lb Roman Bravo-Young
- 141 lb Nick Lee
- 149 lb Austin O'Connor
- 157 lb David Carr
- 165 lb Shane Griffith
- 174 lb Carter Starocci
- 184 lb Aaron Brooks
- 197 lb A.J. Ferrari
- 285 lb Gable Steveson

Women's Freestyle - 2021 NCWWC Championships

- 101 lb Angelina Gomez
- 109 lb Emily Shilson
- 116 lb Felicity Taylor
- 123 lb Cheyenne Sisenstein
- 130 lb Cameron Guerin
- 136 lb Brenda Reyna
- 143 lb Emma Bruntil
- 155 lb Alara Boyd
- 170 lb Yelena Makoyed
- 191 lb Sydnee Kimber

Women's Freestyle - 2021 NAIA Women's Wrestling National Invitational Championships

- 101 lb Nina Pham
- 109 lb Mckayla Campbell
- 116 lb Peyton Prussin
- 123 lb Jasmine Hernandez
- 130 lb Bridgette Duty
- 136 lb Desiree Zavala
- 143 lb Waipuilani Estrella-Beauchamp
- 155 lb Sienna Ramirez
- 170 lb Jordan Nelson
- 191 lb Nkechinyere Nwankwo

=== Qualified Non-Competitors ===
These qualified athletes have chosen or were unable to compete in the 2020 U.S. Olympic Team Trials.

Men's Freestyle

- 57 kg Spencer Lee (injury)
- 57 kg Nick Suriano (COVID-19 positive test)
- 57 kg Roman Bravo-Young (decision)
- 65 kg Tyler Graff
- 65 kg Logan Stieber (decision)
- 65 kg Austin O'Connor
- 74 kg Isaiah Martinez (injury)
- 74 kg Mekhi Lewis (injury)
- 74 kg Alex Dieringer (injury)
- 86 kg Zahid Valencia (injury)
- 97 kg J'den Cox (missed weight)
- Jacob Kasper
- Nick Nevills
- Shane Griffith

== Tournament format ==
1. Challenge tournament(single elimination) – The first part of the trials determined who advanced over to the best–of–three finale and it took place in the first day of competition.
2. Championship series (best-of-3 match final wrestle-off) – In the second part of the trials, the finals which determined the ultimate winner took place, in the second day of competition.

== Brackets ==
=== Men's freestyle ===
Note

- At 74 and 97 kg, Jordan Burroughs and Kyle Snyder had an automatic berth to the best–of–three as returning World Championship medalists, therefore the finalists of the challenge tournament competed for advancement to the finals, unlike the other weight classes where both competitors advance. Also at 74 kg, Kyle Dake earned an automatic bid to the semifinals as the returning World Champion at 79 kg. At 97 kg, J'den Cox had also earned an automatic bid to the semifinals as the returning World Champion at 92 kg, however, he was pulled out of the bracket on the day of the event by USA Wrestling for making weight minutes after the closure of the weight-ins.

==== 57 kg ====
Round of 16 (challenge)
Thomas Gilman (USA)
BYE
Zach Sanders (USA)	0
Zane Richards (USA)	10
Joe Colon (USA)
BYE
BYE
Seth Gross (USA)
Vitali Arujau (USA)
BYE
BYE
Nathan Tomasello (USA)
Sean Russell (USA)
BYE
BYE
Daton Fix (USA)

Quarterfinals (challenge)
Thomas Gilman (USA)	11
Zane Richards (USA)	0
Joe Colon (USA)	9
Seth Gross (USA)	8
Vito Arujau (USA)	3
Nathan Tomasello (USA)	2
Sean Russell (USA)	0
Daton Fix (USA)	11

Semifinals (challenge)
Thomas Gilman (USA)	10
Joe Colon (USA)	0
Vito Arujau (USA)	7
Daton Fix (USA)	5

B.O.T
Thomas Gilman (USA)
Vito Arujau (USA)

Best-2-out-of-3 Match (Wrestle-Off)

Finals
Thomas Gilman (USA)	11^{F}	2
Vitali Arujau (USA)	4	2

Winner – Thomas Gilman (United States)

==== 65 kg ====
Round of 16 (challenge)
Zain Retherford (USA)
BYE
Nahshon Garrett (USA)	2
Anthony Ashnault (USA)	8
Joey McKenna (USA)
BYE
BYE
James Green (USA)
Jordan Oliver (USA)
BYE
Mitch McKee (USA)	2
Nick Lee (USA)	14
Frank Molinaro (USA)	10
Evan Henderson (USA)	1
BYE
Yianni Diakomihalis (USA)

Quarterfinals (challenge)
Zain Retherford (USA)	5
Anthony Ashnault (USA)	1
Joey McKenna (USA)	12
James Green (USA)	1
Jordan Oliver (USA)	8
Nick Lee (USA)	3
Frank Molinaro (USA)	0
Yianni Diakomihalis (USA)	10

Semifinals (challenge)
Zain Retherford (USA)	5
Joey McKenna (USA)	8
Jordan Oliver (USA)	4
Yianni Diakomihalis (USA)	4

Final X
Joey McKenna (USA)
Jordan Oliver (USA)

Best-2-out-of-3 Match (Wrestle-Off)

Finals
Jordan Oliver (USA)	3	5
Joey McKenna (USA)	0	2

Winner – Jordan Oliver (United States)

==== 74 kg ====
Challenge

Round of 16 (challenge)
Jason Nolf (USA)
BYE
David Carr (USA)	8
Logan Massa (USA)	0
BYE
BYE
BYE
BYE
BYE
BYE
BYE
BYE
Thomas Gantt (USA)	8
Evan Wick (USA)	9
Vincenzo Joseph (USA)	3
Chance Marsteller (USA)	3

Quarterfinals (challenge)
Jason Nolf (USA)	10
David Carr (USA)	0
BYE
BYE
BYE
BYE
Evan Wick (USA)	4^{F}
Chance Marsteller (USA)	0

Semifinals (challenge)
Jason Nolf (USA)
BYE
Kyle Dake (USA)	10
Evan Wick (USA)	0

Final (challenge)
Jason Nolf (USA)	0
Kyle Dake (USA)	11

Best-2-out-of-3 Match (Wrestle-Off)

Finals
Jordan Burroughs (USA)	0	2
Kyle Dake (USA)	3	3

Winner – Kyle Dake (United States)

==== 86 kg ====
Round of 16 (challenge)
David Taylor (USA)
BYE
Brett Pfarr (USA)	9
Sam Brooks (USA)	3
Gabe Dean (USA)
BYE
BYE
Myles Martin (USA)
Pat Downey (USA)
BYE
Carter Starocci (USA)	1
Bo Nickal (USA)	6
Nate Jackson (USA)	0
Aaron Brooks (USA)	3
BYE
Zahid Valencia (USA)

Quarterfinals (challenge)
David Taylor (USA)	11
Brett Pfarr (USA)	0
Gabe Dean (USA)	2
Myles Martin (USA)	1
Pat Downey (USA)	3
Bo Nickal (USA)	13
Aaron Brooks (USA)	3
Zahid Valencia (USA)	6

Semifinals (challenge)
David Taylor (USA)	4
Gabe Dean (USA)	0
Bo Nickal (USA)	12
Zahid Valencia (USA)	5

Final X
David Taylor (USA)
Bo Nickal (USA)

Best-2-out-of-3 Match (Wrestle-Off)

Finals
David Taylor (USA)	4	6
Bo Nickal (USA)	0	0

Winner – David Taylor (United States)

==== 97 kg ====
Challenge

Quarterfinals (challenge)		Quarterfinals (challenge)		Semifinals (challenge)
Kollin Moore (USA)	10
Braxton Amos (USA)	0	Kollin Moore (USA)	6
Ty Walz (USA)	2	Ty Walz (USA)	3
Kyven Gadson (USA)	1			Kollin Moore (USA)	10
Michael Macchiavello (USA)	3			Michael Macchiavello (USA)	0
A.J. Ferrari (USA)	1	Michael Macchiavello (USA)	2
Ben Honis (USA)	0	Hayden Zillmer (USA)	2
Hayden Zillmer (USA)	9

Best-2-out-of-3 Match (Wrestle-Off)

Finals
Kyle Snyder (USA)	10	5
Kollin Moore (USA)	0	1

Winner – Kyle Snyder (United States)

==== 125 kg ====
Round of 16 (challenge)
Nick Gwiazdowski (USA)
BYE
Garrett Ryan (USA)	8
Jordan Wood (USA)	3
Tony Nelson (USA)
BYE
BYE
Dom Bradley (USA)
Mason Parris (USA)
BYE
BYE
Greg Kerkvliet (USA)
Tanner Hall (USA)
BYE
BYE
Gable Steveson (USA)

Quarterfinals (challenge)
Nick Gwiazdowski (USA)	11
Garrett Ryan (USA)	0
Tony Nelson (USA)	3
Dom Bradley (USA)	4
Mason Parris (USA)	4
Greg Kerkvliet (USA)	4
Tanner Hall (USA)	0
Gable Steveson (USA)	11

Semifinals (challenge)
Nick Gwiazdowski (USA)	6
Dom Bradley (USA)	2
Greg Kerkvliet (USA)	0
Gable Steveson (USA)	11

Final X
Nick Gwiazdowski (USA)
Gable Steveson (USA)

Best-2-out-of-3 Match (Wrestle-Off)

Finals
Nick Gwiazdowski (USA)	0	4
Gable Steveson (USA)	10	10

Winner – Gable Steveson (United States)

== Consolation brackets ==
=== Men's freestyle ===
==== 57 kg ====
Round of 16 (consolation)
Sean Russell (USA)	6
Zach Sanders (USA)	4
Nathan Tomasello (USA)
BYE
Seth Gross (USA)
BYE
BYE
Zane Richards (USA)

Quarterfinals (consolation)
Sean Russell (USA)	6
Nathan Tomasello (USA)	13
Seth Gross (USA)
Zane Richards (USA)	WO

Semifinals (consolation)
Joe Colon (USA)
Nathan Tomasello (USA)	WO
Zane Richards (USA)	WO
Daton Fix (USA)

Third-place match
Nathan Tomasello (USA)	12
Zane Richards (USA)	6

==== 65 kg ====
Round of 16 (consolation)
Frank Molinaro (USA)
Nahshon Garrett (USA)	WO
Nick Lee (USA)
BYE
Mitch McKee (USA)	WO
James Green (USA)
Anthony Ashnault (USA)	2
Evan Henderson (USA)	12

Quarterfinals (consolation)
Nahshon Garrett (USA)	2
Nick Lee (USA)	12
Mitch McKee (USA)	13
Evan Henderson (USA)	3

Semifinals (consolation)
Zain Retherford (USA)	4
Nick Lee (USA)	10
Mitch McKee (USA)	4
Yianni Diakomihalis (USA)	14

Third-place match
Nick Lee (USA)	16
Yianni Diakomihalis (USA)	8

==== 74 kg ====
Round of 16 (consolation)
BYE
Logan Massa (USA)
Thomas Gantt (USA)	WO
Vincenzo Joseph (USA)

Quarterfinals (consolation)
Logan Massa (USA)
BYE
Thomas Gantt (USA)	7
David Carr (USA)	1

Semifinals (consolation)
Logan Massa (USA)	9
Chance Marsteller (USA)	4
Thomas Gantt (USA)	2
Evan Wick (USA)	8

Third-place match
Logan Massa (USA)	9
Evan Wick (USA)	13
True second
Jason Nolf (USA)	10
Evan Wick (USA)	0

==== 86 kg ====
Round of 16 (consolation)
Aaron Brooks (USA)	6
Sammy Brooks (USA)	3
Pat Downey (USA)
BYE
Carter Starocci (USA)	2
Myles Martin (USA)	5
Nate Jackson (USA)	9
Brett Pfarr (USA)	2

Quarterfinals (consolation)
Aaron Brooks (USA)	0
Pat Downey (USA)	11
Myles Martin (USA)	1
Nate Jackson (USA)	2

Semifinals (consolation)
Gabe Dean (USA)
Pat Downey (USA)	WO
Nate Jackson (USA)	0
Zahid Valencia (USA)	10

Third-place match
Pat Downey (USA)	1
Zahid Valencia (USA)	11

==== 97 kg ====
Quarterfinals (consolation)		Quarterfinals (consolation)		Semifinals (consolation)
		Hayden Zillmer (USA)
Braxton Amons (USA)		Kyven Gadson (USA)	WO
Kyven Gadson (USA)	WO			Kyven Gadson (USA)	6
A.J. Ferrari (USA)	10			Ty Walz (USA)	0
Ben Honis (USA)	11	Ben Honis (USA)	2
		Ty Walz (USA)	6

==== 125 kg ====
Round of 16 (consolation)
Tanner Hall (USA)	9
Jordan Wood (USA)	5
Mason Parris (USA)
BYE
BYE
Anthony Nelson (USA)
BYE
Garrett Ryan (USA)

Quarterfinals (consolation)
Tanner Hall (USA)	0
Mason Parris (USA)	10
Anthony Nelson (USA)	4
Garrett Ryan (USA)	0

Semifinals (consolation)
Dom Bradley (USA)	4
Mason Parris (USA)	7
Anthony Nelson (USA)	3
Greg Kerkvliet (USA)	1

Third-place match
Mason Parris (USA)	6
Anthony Nelson (USA)	3

== See also ==
- United States at the 2020 Summer Olympics
- Wrestling at the 2020 Summer Olympics
- Wrestling at the 2020 Summer Olympics – Qualification
