= Michael Macchiavello =

American wrestler (born 1994)

Personal information
- Full name: Michael Justin Macchiavello
- Born: December 24, 1994 (age 31) Charlotte, North Carolina, U.S.
- Home town: Monroe, North Carolina, U.S.

Sport
- Country: United States
- Sport: Wrestling
- Events: Freestyle and Folkstyle
- College team: NC State
- Club: Lehigh Valley WC; Titan Mercury WC; Wolfpack WC
- Team: USA
- Coached by: Pat Popolizio; Adam Hall
Medal record
Men's freestyle wrestling
Representing the United States
Pan American Championships
| Gold medal – first place | 2023 Buenos Aires | 92 kg |
Grand Prix
| Gold medal – first place | 2024 Nice | 97 kg |
| Gold medal – first place | 2025 Nice | 92 kg |
| Bronze medal – third place | 2025 Tirana | 92 kg |
| Bronze medal – third place | 2026 Nice | 92 kg |
Poland Open (Wacław Ziółkowski Memorial)
| Bronze medal – third place | 2023 Warsaw | 92 kg |
Dan Kolov & Nikola Petrov Tournament
| Bronze medal – third place | 2019 Ruse | 92 kg |
US Open Championships
| Gold medal – first place | 2022 Las Vegas | 97 kg |
| Gold medal – first place | 2023 Las Vegas | 92 kg |
| Gold medal – first place | 2026 Las Vegas | 92 kg |
| Bronze medal – third place | 2019 Las Vegas | 92 kg |
| Bronze medal – third place | 2025 Las Vegas | 92 kg |
Men's collegiate wrestling
Representing the NC State Wolfpack
NCAA Division I Championships
| Gold medal – first place | 2018 Cleveland | 197 lb |
ACC Championships
| Silver medal – second place | 2017 Raleigh | 184 lb |
| Silver medal – second place | 2018 Chapel Hill | 197 lb |

Michael Justin Macchiavello (born December 24, 1994) is an American freestyle wrestler and graduated folkstyle wrestler. During his collegiate career at NC State, Macchiavello won the 2018 NCAA Division I Wrestling title at 197-pounds. Following college, he would continue wrestling on the senior level freestyle circuit. Macchiavello formally competed for the Wolfpack Wrestling Club in Raleigh, North Carolina and formally competed for the Lehigh Valley Wrestling Club in Bethlehem, Pennsylvania. As of 2026, Macchiavello is an assistant coach at Army.

== High school career ==
Macchiavello attended Sun Valley High School in Monroe, North Carolina. He was the 2013 NCHSAA 4A 182-pound wrestling state champion. He placed third at the 2012 NCHSAA 4A state championships at 182-pounds and was also a two-time placer at FloNationals.

== College career ==
During his collegiate career at NC State, he finished second at the Atlantic Coast Conference (ACC) championships twice and won the 197-pound national title at the 2018 NCAA Division I Wrestling Championships in Cleveland, Ohio. He was 11–14 as a freshman and 9–8 as a sophomore. Macchiavello would redshirt for a season and returned his redshirt junior year with a 26–8 record and was the 10th seed at 184-pounds at the 2017 NCAA Division I Wrestling Championships, where he finished one win shy of All-American honors. His redshirt senior year he moved up to 197-pounds, where he went 22–3, becoming an All-American and NCAA champion.

== Freestyle wrestling career ==
Macchiavello won the 2018 U23 United States World Team Trails at 92 kg, which qualified him for the 2018 U23 World Championships held in Romania.

In 2019, he made his first USA National Team on the senior level. During 2019, he finished second at the 2019 World Team Trials Challenge Tournament and third at the 2019 US Open at 92 kg.

He would win his first Pan American Wrestling Championship and also the US Open Championship in 2023 at 92 kg. Macchiavello's US Open Championship would qualify him for the 2023 Final X at 92 kg, where he dropped two matches in a best two out of three series to Zahid Valencia, in the wrestle-offs for the USA 92 kg spot at the 2023 World Championships.

Macchiavello won the 2026 US Open at 92 kg, qualifying him for Final X in June. In the 2026 Final X wrestle-offs, he lost two matches to former NC State wrestler and defending 92 kg World Champion Trent Hidlay.

== Coaching career ==
On May 1, 2026, Macchiavello was announced as an assistant wrestling coach at Army.

== Freestyle record ==
Senior Freestyle Matches
| Res. | Record | Opponent | Score | Date | Event | Location |
2026 US World Team Trials (silver) at 92 kg
| Win | 85-41 | (United States) Trent Hidlay | 3-8 | June 13, 2026 | 2026 Final X | (United States) Chantilly, Virginia |
| Win | 85-40 | (United States) Trent Hidlay | 1-2 | June 13, 2026 | 2026 Final X | (United States) Chantilly, Virginia |
2026 US Open (gold) at 92 kg
| Win | 85-39 | (United States) Dustin Plott | 4–3 | April 24–25, 2026 | 2026 US Open National Championships | (United States) Las Vegas, Nevada |
| Win | 84-39 | (United States) Joshua Barr | 4–1 | April 24–25, 2026 | 2026 US Open National Championships | (United States) Las Vegas, Nevada |
| Win | 83-39 | (United States) Cody Merrill | 2–1 | April 24–25, 2026 | 2026 US Open National Championships | (United States) Las Vegas, Nevada |
| Win | 82–39 | (United States) Harvey Ludington | TF 8–1 | April 24–25, 2026 | 2026 US Open National Championships | (United States) Las Vegas, Nevada |
2026 Grand Prix Zagreb Open 5th at 92 kg
| Loss | 81-39 | (United States) Dustin Plott | 1–6 | February 8, 2026 | 2026 Grand Prix Zagreb Open | Zagreb, Croatia |
| Loss | 81-38 | (United States) Trent Hidlay | 3–3 | February 8, 2026 | 2026 Grand Prix Zagreb Open | Zagreb, Croatia |
| Win | 81-37 | (Georgia (country)) Zaur Beradze | 3–2 | February 8, 2026 | 2026 Grand Prix Zagreb Open | Zagreb, Croatia |
| Loss | 80-37 | (United States) Dustin Plott | 3–6 | February 8, 2026 | 2026 Grand Prix Zagreb Open | Zagreb, Croatia |
| Win | | (India) Jointy Kumar | FF | February 8, 2026 | 2026 Grand Prix Zagreb Open | Zagreb, Croatia |
2026 Henri Deglane Grand Prix (bronze) at 92 kg
| Win | 80-36 | (Germany) Daniel Fischer | 6-0 | January 10, 2026 | 2026 Henri Deglane Grand Prix | Nice, France |
| Loss | 79-36 | (United States) Jacob Cardenas | TF 0–11 | January 10, 2026 | 2026 Henri Deglane Grand Prix | Nice, France |
| Win | 79-35 | (Moldova) Ion Demian | 5-2 | January 10, 2026 | 2026 Henri Deglane Grand Prix | Nice, France |
| Win | 78-35 | (Switzerland) Samuel Scherrer | TF 11–0 | January 10, 2026 | 2026 Henri Deglane Grand Prix | Nice, France |
| Win | 77-35 | (Russia) Amanula Gadzhimagomedov | 10–6 | July 21, 2025 | 2025 PWL 9 – USA vs Russia | Budapest, Hungary |
2025 World Team Trials (bronze) at 92 kg
| Win | 76-35 | (United States) Dustin Plott | 4–1 | May 16, 2025 | 2025 World Team Trials | (United States) Louisville, Kentucky |
| Win | 75-35 | (United States) Patrick Brophy | TF 11–0 | May 16, 2025 | 2025 World Team Trials | (United States) Louisville, Kentucky |
| Loss | 74-35 | (United States) Aeoden Sinclair | 3-4 | May 16, 2025 | 2025 World Team Trials | (United States) Louisville, Kentucky |
2025 US Open (bronze) at 92 kg
| Win | 74-34 | (United States) Eric Schultz | 2–1 | April 23, 2025 | 2025 US Open | (United States) Las Vegas, Nevada |
| Win | 73-34 | (United States) Dustin Plott | TF 11–0 | April 23, 2025 | 2025 US Open | (United States) Las Vegas, Nevada |
| Loss | 72-34 | (United States) Aeoden Sinclair | 1–1 | April 23, 2025 | 2025 US Open | (United States) Las Vegas, Nevada |
| Win | 72-33 | (United States) Jack Wehmeyer | TF 12–2 | April 23, 2025 | 2025 US Open | (United States) Las Vegas, Nevada |
| Win | 71-33 | (United States) Jordan Blanchard | TF 10–0 | April 23, 2025 | 2025 US Open | (United States) Las Vegas, Nevada |
2025 Muhamet Malo Tournament (bronze) at 92 kg
| Win | 70-33 | (Bulgaria) Akhmed Bataev | 3–1 | February 27, 2025 | 2025 Muhamet Malo Tournament | Tirana, Albania |
| Loss | 69-33 | (Russia) Alan Bagaev | 0-8 | February 27, 2025 | 2025 Muhamet Malo Tournament | Tirana, Albania |
| Win | 69-32 | (China) Narenmanduhai | TF 11–0 | February 27, 2025 | 2025 Muhamet Malo Tournament | Tirana, Albania |
| Win | 68-32 | (Kazakhstan) Nurdaulet Bekenov | TF 10–0 | February 27, 2025 | 2025 Muhamet Malo Tournament | Tirana, Albania |
2025 Grand Prix Zagreb Open (bronze) at 92 kg
| Win | 67-32 | (France) Adlan Viskhanov | 9–1 | February 5, 2025 | 2025 Grand Prix Zagreb Open | Zagreb, Croatia |
| Win | 66-32 | (Georgia (country)) Zaur Beradze | 12–4 | February 5, 2025 | 2025 Grand Prix Zagreb Open | Zagreb, Croatia |
| Loss | 65-32 | (Iran) Amir Hossein Firouzpour | 0-5 | February 5, 2025 | 2025 Grand Prix Zagreb Open | Zagreb, Croatia |
2025 Henri Deglane Grand Prix (gold) at 92 kg
| Win | 65-31 | (France) Adlan Viskhanov | 8–2 | January 17, 2025 | 2025 Henri Deglane Grand Prix | Nice, France |
| Win | 64-31 | (Switzerland) Samuel Scherrer | 7–0 | January 17, 2025 | 2025 Henri Deglane Grand Prix | Nice, France |
| Win | | (Finland) Juho Ruusila | FF | January 17, 2025 | 2025 Henri Deglane Grand Prix | Nice, France |
| Win | 63-31 | (Germany) Alexander Weiss | TF 12–2 | January 17, 2025 | 2025 Henri Deglane Grand Prix | Nice, France |
| Win | 62-31 | (Austria) Benjamin Greil | 9–0 | January 17, 2025 | 2025 Henri Deglane Grand Prix | Nice, France |
2024 Bill Farrell Memorial (silver) at 97 kg
| Loss | 61-31 | (United States) Kyle Snyder | TF 1–11 | November 9, 2024 | 2024 Bill Farrell Memorial | (United States) New York City, New York |
| Win | 61-30 | (United States) Justin Rademacher | 6–3 | November 9, 2024 | 2024 Bill Farrell Memorial | (United States) New York City, New York |
| Win | 60-30 | (Dominican Republic) Luis Perez Sosa | 11–2 | November 9, 2024 | 2024 Bill Farrell Memorial | (United States) New York City, New York |
2024 World Team Trials 4th at 92 kg
| Win | 59-30 | (United States) Marcus Coleman | TF 11–0 | September 14, 2024 | 2024 World Team Trials | (United States) Omaha, Nebraska |
| Win | 58-30 | (United States) Maximus Hale | 8–2 | September 14, 2024 | 2024 World Team Trials | (United States) Omaha, Nebraska |
| Loss | 57-30 | (United States) David Taylor | TF 0–10 | September 14, 2024 | 2024 World Team Trials | (United States) Omaha, Nebraska |
| Win | 57-29 | (United States) Eric Schultz | 6–5 | September 14, 2024 | 2024 World Team Trials | (United States) Omaha, Nebraska |
| Win | 56-29 | (United States) Nick Stemmet | 7–0 | September 14, 2024 | 2024 World Team Trials | (United States) Omaha, Nebraska |
2024 US Olympic Trials DNP at 97 kg
| Loss | 55-29 | (United States) Eric Schultz | 2-3 | April 19, 2024 | 2024 US Olympic Trials | (United States) State College, Pennsylvania |
| Loss | 55-28 | (United States) Jonathan Aiello | 4-8 | April 19, 2024 | 2024 US Olympic Trials | (United States) State College, Pennsylvania |
2024 Henri Deglane (gold) at 97 kg
| Win | 55-27 | (United States) Nate Jackson | 4–2 | January 19, 2024 | 2024 Henri Deglane | Nice, France |
| Win | 54-27 | (Belgium) Tarik Azzouzi | TF 10–0 | January 19, 2024 | 2024 Henri Deglane | Nice, France |
| Win | 53-27 | (Lithuania) Lukas Krasauskas | TF 11–0 | January 19, 2024 | 2024 Henri Deglane | Nice, France |
| Win | 52-27 | (Tunisia) Mohamed Saadaoui | TF 11–1 | January 19, 2024 | 2024 Henri Deglane | Nice, France |
2024 Grand Prix Zagreb Open DNP at 97 kg
| Loss | 51-27 | (Poland) Radosław Baran | 0-5 | January 10, 2024 | 2024 Grand Prix Zagreb Open | Zagreb, Croatia |
| Loss | 51-26 | (Iran) Amir Ali Azarpira | TF 0–10 | January 10, 2024 | 2024 Grand Prix Zagreb Open | Zagreb, Croatia |
2023 Bill Farrell Memorial (gold) at 97 kg
| Win | 51-25 | (United States) Jacob Warner | 4–0 | November 17, 2023 | 2023 Bill Farrell Memorial | (United States) New York City, New York |
| Win | 50-25 | (United States) Jonathan Aiello | TF 11–0 | November 17, 2023 | 2023 Bill Farrell Memorial | (United States) New York City, New York |
| Win | 49-25 | (United States) Duncan Lee | TF 10–0 | November 17, 2023 | 2023 Bill Farrell Memorial | (United States) New York City, New York |
| Win | 48-25 | (Canada) Xavier Lauzon | TF 10–0 | November 17, 2023 | 2023 Bill Farrell Memorial | (United States) New York City, New York |
2023 Poland Open (bronze) at 92 kg
| Win | 47-25 | (Ukraine) Nazar Dodd | TF 11–0 | July 26, 2023 | 2023 Poland Open | Warsaw, Poland |
| Win | 46-25 | (Poland) Filip Rogut | TF 10–0 | July 26, 2023 | 2023 Poland Open | Warsaw, Poland |
| Loss | 45-25 | (Azerbaijan) Osman Nurmagomedov | 2-8 | July 26, 2023 | 2023 Poland Open | Warsaw, Poland |
| Win | 45-24 | (United States) Nick Stemmet | TF 10–0 | July 26, 2023 | 2023 Poland Open | Warsaw, Poland |
| Loss | 44-24 | (United States) Zahid Valencia | 2-9 | June 10, 2023 | 2023 Final X: Newark | (United States) Newark, New Jersey |
| Loss | 44-23 | (United States) Zahid Valencia | 0-8 | June 10, 2023 | 2023 Final X: Newark | (United States) Newark, New Jersey |
2023 Pan American Championships (gold) at 92 kg
| Win | 44-22 | (Canada) Jeremy Poirier | TF 10–0 | May 3, 2023 | 2023 Pan American Championships | Buenos Aires, Argentina |
| Win | | (Argentina) Sebastian Reiss | FF | May 3, 2023 | 2023 Pan American Championships | Buenos Aires, Argentina |
| Win | 43-22 | (Puerto Rico) Luis Rivera | TF 11–0 | May 3, 2023 | 2023 Pan American Championships | Buenos Aires, Argentina |
| Win | 42-22 | (Ecuador) Luis Villagomez | TF 10–0 | May 3, 2023 | 2023 Pan American Championships | Buenos Aires, Argentina |
2023 US Open (gold) at 92 kg
| Win | 41-22 | (United States) Kollin Moore | TF 12–2 | April 26, 2023 | 2023 US Open | (United States) Las Vegas, Nevada |
| Win | 40-22 | (United States) Nate Jackson | 4–2 | April 26, 2023 | 2023 US Open | (United States) Las Vegas, Nevada |
| Win | 39-22 | (United States) Jonathan Aiello | 4–0 | April 26, 2023 | 2023 US Open | (United States) Las Vegas, Nevada |
| Win | 38-22 | (United States) Zachery Ferris | TF 11–0 | April 26, 2023 | 2023 US Open | (United States) Las Vegas, Nevada |
2022 Bill Farrell Memorial (gold) at 97 kg
| Win | 37-22 | (Ukraine) Murazi Mchedlidze | 3–0 | November 18, 2022 | 2022 Bill Farrell Memorial | (United States) New York City, New York |
| Win | 36-22 | (Canada) Nishan Randhawa | TF 10–0 | November 18, 2022 | 2022 Bill Farrell Memorial | (United States) New York City, New York |
| Win | 35-22 | (Ukraine) Vasyl Sova | 13–8 | November 18, 2022 | 2022 Bill Farrell Memorial | (United States) New York City, New York |
2022 Poland Open 5th at 97 kg
| Loss | 34-22 | (Georgia (country)) Elizbar Odikadze | 1-9 | July 20, 2022 | 2022 Poland Open | Warsaw, Poland |
| Loss | 34-21 | (Georgia (country)) Givi Matcharashvili | 6-8 | July 20, 2022 | 2022 Poland Open | Warsaw, Poland |
| Win | 34-20 | (China) Tuerxnub Muheite | 5–4 | July 20, 2022 | 2022 Poland Open | Warsaw, Poland |
| Win | 33-20 | (Australia) Thomas Barns | TF 11–0 | July 20, 2022 | 2022 Poland Open | Warsaw, Poland |
2022 World Team Trials Challenge Tournament (silver) at 97 kg
| Loss | 32-20 | (United States) Kollin Moore | 0-6 | May 21, 2022 | 2022 World Team Trials Challenge Tournament | (United States) Coralville, Iowa |
| Loss | 32-19 | (United States) Kollin Moore | TF 0–10 | May 21, 2022 | 2022 World Team Trials Challenge Tournament | (United States) Coralville, Iowa |
| Win | 32-18 | (United States) Ethan Laird | 8–2 | May 21, 2022 | 2022 World Team Trials Challenge Tournament | (United States) Coralville, Iowa |
2022 Marine Corps US Open (gold) at 97 kg
| Win | 31-18 | (United States) Joe Rau | 6–1 | April 27, 2022 | 2022 Marine Corps US Open | (United States) Las Vegas, Nevada |
| Win | 30-18 | (United States) Timothy Dudley | 5–2 | April 27, 2022 | 2022 Marine Corps US Open | (United States) Las Vegas, Nevada |
| Win | 29-18 | (United States) Marco Retano | TF 10–0 | April 27, 2022 | 2022 Marine Corps US Open | (United States) Las Vegas, Nevada |
2022 Bill Farrell Memorial (gold) at 97 kg
| Win | 28-18 | (United States) Morgan Smith | TF 10–0 | April 1, 2022 | 2022 Bill Farrell Memorial | (United States) New York City |
| Win | 27-18 | (United States) Joe Rau | 4–1 | April 1, 2022 | 2022 Bill Farrell Memorial | (United States) New York City |
| Win | 26-18 | (United States) Tyler Thurston | TF 10–0 | April 1, 2022 | 2022 Bill Farrell Memorial | (United States) New York City |
| Win | 25-18 | (Canada) Nishan Randhawa | 8–0 | April 1, 2022 | 2022 Bill Farrell Memorial | (United States) New York City |
2020 US Olympic Team Trials (bronze) at 97 kg
| Loss | 24-18 | (United States) Kyven Gadson | Fall | April 2, 2021 | 2020 US Olympic Team Trials | (United States) Fort Worth, Texas |
| Loss | 24-17 | (United States) Kollin Moore | TF 0–10 | April 2, 2021 | 2020 US Olympic Team Trials | (United States) Fort Worth, Texas |
| Win | 24-16 | (United States) Hayden Zillmer | 2–2 | April 2, 2021 | 2020 US Olympic Team Trials | (United States) Fort Worth, Texas |
| Win | 23-16 | (United States) A.J. Ferrari | 3–1 | April 2, 2021 | 2020 US Olympic Team Trials | (United States) Fort Worth, Texas |
2021 America's Cup at 97 kg
| Win | 22-16 | (United States) Ben Honis | 7–1 | February 10, 2021 | 2021 America's Cup | (United States) Concord, North Carolina |
| Win | 21-16 | (United States) Scottie Boykin | TF 10–0 | February 10, 2021 | 2021 America's Cup | (United States) Concord, North Carolina |
| Loss | 20-16 | (United States) Hayden Zillmer | 1-3 | February 10, 2021 | 2021 America's Cup | (United States) Concord, North Carolina |
| Win | 20-15 | (United States) Austin Schafer | 5–0 | February 10, 2021 | 2021 America's Cup | (United States) Concord, North Carolina |
| Loss | 19-15 | (United States) Gabe Dean | 5–5 | January 8, 2021 | 2021 FloWrestling: SCRTC I | (United States) Austin, Texas |
2020 FloWrestling: RTC Cup at 97 kg
| Loss | 19-14 | (United States) Dom Bradley | 1-2 | December 4, 2020 | 2020 FloWrestling: RTC Cup | (United States) Cincinnati, Ohio |
| Win | 19-13 | (Lebanon) Domenic Abounader | 7–2 | December 4, 2020 | 2020 FloWrestling: RTC Cup | (United States) Cincinnati, Ohio |
| Win | 18-13 | (United States) Kollin Moore | 6–6 | December 4, 2020 | 2020 FloWrestling: RTC Cup | (United States) Cincinnati, Ohio |
| Loss | 17-13 | (United States) Hayden Zillmer | 4-8 | December 4, 2020 | 2020 FloWrestling: RTC Cup | (United States) Cincinnati, Ohio |
| Win | 17-12 | (United States) Timothy Dudley | 5–4 | December 4, 2020 | 2020 FloWrestling: RTC Cup | (United States) Cincinnati, Ohio |
| Loss | 16-12 | (United States) Kyle Snyder | TF 0–12 | September 19, 2020 | 2020 NLWC I -97 kg | (United States) State College, Pennsylvania |
2019 Alans International DNP at 92 kg
| Loss | 16-11 | (Russia) Anzor Urishev | 6-9 | December 7, 2019 | 2019 Alans International | Vladikavkaz, Russia |
| Loss | 16-10 | (Russia) Magomed Kurbanov | 0-3 | December 7, 2019 | 2019 Alans International | Vladikavkaz, Russia |
| Win | 16-9 | (Turkmenistan) Rahmangeldi Vepayev | TF 10–0 | December 7, 2019 | 2019 Alans International | Vladikavkaz, Russia |
| Win | 15-9 | (Russia) Muslim Magomedov | 5–3 | December 7, 2019 | 2019 Alans International | Vladikavkaz, Russia |
2019 Bill Farrell Memorial (silver) at 97 kg
| Loss | 14-9 | (United States) Kyle Snyder | TF 0–10 | November 15, 2019 | 2019 Bill Farrell Memorial | (United States) New York City, New York |
| Win | 14-8 | (United States) Ty Walz | 4–0 | November 15, 2019 | 2019 Bill Farrell Memorial | (United States) New York City, New York |
| Win | 13-8 | (United States) Enock Francois | TF 10–0 | November 15, 2019 | 2019 Bill Farrell Memorial | (United States) New York City, New York |
2019 Continental Cup DNP at 92 kg
| Loss | 12-8 | (Russia) Radik Nartikoev | 3-4 | October 14, 2019 | 2019 Continental Cup | Dagestan, Russia |
| Win | 12-7 | (Russia) Akhmed Tazhudinov | Fall | October 14, 2019 | 2019 Continental Cup | Dagestan, Russia |
2019 Alexander Medved DNP at 92 kg
| Loss | 11-7 | (Russia) Guram Chertkoev | 1-3 | August 9, 2019 | 2019 Alexander Medved | Minsk, Belarus |
| Loss | 11-6 | (Belarus) Ivan Yankouski | TF 0–10 | August 9, 2019 | 2019 Alexander Medved | Minsk, Belarus |
2019 World Team Trials Challenge Tournament (silver) at 92 kg
| Loss | 11-5 | (United States) Bo Nickal | 0-5 | May 16, 2019 | 2019 World Team Trials Challenge Tournament | (United States) Raleigh, North Carolina |
| Loss | 11-4 | (United States) Bo Nickal | TF 0–10 | May 16, 2019 | 2019 World Team Trials Challenge Tournament | (United States) Raleigh, North Carolina |
| Win | 11-3 | (United States) Hayden Zillmer | 3–0 | May 16, 2019 | 2019 World Team Trials Challenge Tournament | (United States) Raleigh, North Carolina |
| Win | 10-3 | (United States) Timothy Dudley | 5–3 | May 16, 2019 | 2019 World Team Trials Challenge Tournament | (United States) Raleigh, North Carolina |
| Win | 9-3 | (United States) Scottie Boykin | 10–6 | May 16, 2019 | 2019 World Team Trials Challenge Tournament | (United States) Raleigh, North Carolina |
2019 Marine Corps US Open (bronze) at 92 kg
| Win | 8-3 | (United States) Timothy Dudley | INJ | April 23, 2019 | 2019 Marine Corps US Open | (United States) Las Vegas, Nevada |
| Win | 7-3 | (United States) Riley Lefever | 5–0 | April 23, 2019 | 2019 Marine Corps US Open | (United States) Las Vegas, Nevada |
| Loss | 6-3 | (United States) Bo Nickal | TF 4–14 | April 23, 2019 | 2019 Marine Corps US Open | (United States) Las Vegas, Nevada |
| Win | 6-2 | (United States) Timothy Dudley | 9–2 | April 23, 2019 | 2019 Marine Corps US Open | (United States) Las Vegas, Nevada |
| Win | 5-2 | (United States) Patrick Brucki | 10–2 | April 23, 2019 | 2019 Marine Corps US Open | (United States) Las Vegas, Nevada |
| Win | 4-2 | (United States) Kadeem Samuels | TF 10–0 | April 23, 2019 | 2019 Marine Corps US Open | (United States) Las Vegas, Nevada |
2019 Dan Kolov & Nikola Petrov Tournament (bronze) at 92 kg
| Win | 3-2 | (Algeria) Mohammed Fardj | INJ | February 28, 2019 | 2019 Dan Kolov & Nikola Petrov Tournament | Ruse, Bulgaria |
| Loss | 2-2 | (Russia) Magomed Kurbanov | 2-3 | February 28, 2019 | 2019 Dan Kolov & Nikola Petrov Tournament | Ruse, Bulgaria |
| Win | 2-1 | (Hungary) István Veréb | 6–2 | February 28, 2019 | 2019 Dan Kolov & Nikola Petrov Tournament | Ruse, Bulgaria |
2019 Henri Deglane Grand Prix DNP at 92 kg
| Loss | 1-1 | (Germany) Gennadij Cudinovic | 10–10 | February 1, 2019 | 2019 Henri Deglane Grand Prix | Nice, France |
| Win | 1-0 | (United States) Deron Winn | 8–0 | November 30, 2018 | 2018 AWL 1 – The Beginning | (United States) Cedar Rapids, Iowa |
