= Kollin Moore =

American wrestler (born 1997)

Personal information
- Full name: Kollin Raymond Moore
- Born: May 2, 1997 (age 29) Burbank, Ohio, U.S.
- Height: 1.83 m (6 ft 0 in)
- Weight: 97 kg (214 lb)

Sport
- Country: USA
- Sport: Wrestling
- Events: Freestyle; Folkstyle
- College team: Ohio State
- Coached by: Tom Ryan
Medal record
Men's freestyle wrestling
Representing United States
World Cup
| Gold medal – first place | 2022 Coralville | Team |
Yasar Dogu Tournament
| Bronze medal – third place | 2022 Istanbul | 97 kg |
Grand Prix
| Gold medal – first place | 2021 Rome | 97 kg |
| Gold medal – first place | 2023 Zagreb | 92 kg |
U23 World Championships
| Silver medal – second place | 2018 Bucharest | 97 kg |
Junior World Championships
| Bronze medal – third place | 2017 Tampere | 96 kg |
US National Championships
| Gold medal – first place | 2020 Coralville (SN) | 97 kg |
| Silver medal – second place | 2019 Fort Worth (SN) | 97 kg |
Men's collegiate wrestling
Representing the Ohio State Buckeyes
NCAA Division I Championships
| Silver medal – second place | 2019 Pittsburgh | 197 lb |
| Bronze medal – third place | 2017 St. Louis | 197 lb |
Big Ten Championships
| Gold medal – first place | 2017 Bloomington | 197 lb |
| Gold medal – first place | 2018 East Lansing | 197 lb |
| Gold medal – first place | 2020 Piscataway | 197 lb |
| Silver medal – second place | 2019 Minneapolis | 197 lb |

Kollin Raymond Moore (born May 2, 1997) is an American freestyle wrestler and graduated folkstyle wrestler who competes at 97 kilograms. In freestyle, he won the '21 Matteo Pellicone Ranking Series title, defeating Iran's Alireza Karimi in the final, is the reigning US national champion, and was the '18 U23 World Championship and '19 US national runner-up. As a folkstyle wrestler, he was a four-time NCAA Division I All-American, three-time Big Ten Conference champion, and the 2020 Dan Hodge Trophy runner-up for the Ohio State Buckeyes.

== Folkstyle career ==
=== High school ===
Moore attended Norwayne High School in Creston, Ohio, where he was a multiple–sport-athlete, competing in soccer, track, football and wrestling. He went 51–0 as a senior, not giving up an offensive point throughout the whole season and becoming the first OHSAA state champion of the school with a 23–8 technical fall in the finals, before graduating in 2015. A two–time Garfield Heights district champion, two–time state finalist and NHSCA All–American, Moore was the eleventh Ohioan to compile more than 200 victories, with a record of 204 wins and 11 losses (ten of them came in his first two years). As a soccer player, he was named the WCAL Player of the Year in 2014. He was also a standout student, with a 3.8 GPA. After capping off his high school career, Moore was recruited by the Ohio State Buckeyes.

=== College ===
==== 2015-16 ====
Redshirt; While competing at 197 pounds, Moore compiled 25 wins and 4 losses, was the Findlay Open champion and placed second at the Eastern Michigan Open, third at the Penn State Open and fourth at the Michigan State Open.

==== 2016-17 ====
Freshman; Tying Ohio State's record for total wins by a freshman, Moore racked up a 33–4 record, all four losses coming in the hands of the two NCAA finalists; J'den Cox, '16 Olympic Bronze medalist from Missouri and Brett Pfarr, returning All-American from Minnesota. He averaged 18 points per match that didn't end via pin, won the Eastern Michigan Open championship, placed third at the Cliff Keen Invitational and added up bonus points in 19 of his 33 victories. Moore claimed his first Big Ten Conference title after beating top-seeded Brett Pfarr and helped to clinch the team title, entering the NCAA's as the third seed. At the National Tournament, Moore was on a ride with three majors (two of them over the fourteenth and sixth seeds) on his way to the semifinals, but was topped by Pfarr in a frenetic 9–13 match to end the series 3–1 in favor of the Gopher. He was able to bounce back with a decision over seventh-seeded Aaron Studebaker from Nebraska and a pin over the fourth-seeded Jared Haught from Virginia Tech in the third-place match to claim the bronze, and All–American status. Moore was then named the Big Ten Freshman of the Year.

==== 2017-18 ====
Sophomore; Moore started off the season with 18 straight wins and a Cliff Keen Invitational title, where he recorded a notable fall over Jared Haught from Virginia Tech. His losses of regular season came in the hands of future NCAA champions Anthony Cassar in a dual against Penn State and Michael Macchiavello in a dual against NC State. The number one seed, Moore won his second back–to–back Big Ten title. At the NCAA's, he reached the quarterfinals before being dropped by the unseeded Kyle Conel from KSU. After a series of victories over the second, fifth and fourteenth seeds, Moore was once again defeated by Conel to place fourth and become a two-time All-American.

==== 2018-19 ====
Junior; To start off the season, Moore claimed his second straight prestigious Cliff Keen Invitational title and won seven dual meets in a row before suffering his first and only loss of the regular season, as he was pinned by two-time NCAA champion (184lbs) and returning Schalles Award winner from PSU Bo Nickal in the first period, in a match of undefeated-in-the-season wrestlers. Before regular season concluded, he racked up three more wins for the Buckeyes. At the Big Ten Conference Championships, the two-time and defending champion Moore made his third straight final, but fell once again to Bo Nickal in the finals. At the NCAA's, Moore, the second seed, hit a three–match win streak to reach the semis, where he dominantly defeated the third seeded Preston Weigel from Oklahoma State. In the finals, he was once again stopped by Bo Nickal, claiming runner–up honors.

==== 2019-20 ====
Senior; In his final season as a collegiate athlete, Moore went undefeated at 27–0, claiming the Michigan State Open and Cliff Keen Invitational titles and going 14–0 in dual meets. At the Big Ten Championships, the top-seeded Moore went 3–0, defeating Nebraska's Eric Schultz in the final to claim his third conference title. Moore was a big favorite to claim his first NCAA title and the top seed; however, the 2020 NCAA Division I tournament was canceled as a result of the COVID-19 outbreak, costing Moore his final opportunity to become an NCAA champion. After the season, Moore was voted as a runner-up for the prestigious Dan Hodge Trophy behind Spencer Lee.

== Freestyle career ==
=== Age-group ===
Moore did not compete actively in freestyle during the folkstyle off-season, as he participated in other sports. In 2016, he placed seventh at the UWW US Junior National Championships, but despite that, was able to overcome the field from the US Junior World Team Trials and competed at the World Championships, placing twelfth. The returning US World Team Member, Moore made back-to-back team, by sweeping everyone in the bracket by technical fall. He earned a bronze medal from the World Championships.

=== Senior level ===
==== 2018–2019 ====
A 21-year old junior, Moore made the '18 US U23 World Team on June, while also avenging his loss from the NCAA championships to Kyle Conel, defeating him twice by technical fall. On November, he competed at the U23 World Championships, defeating '18 Russian National bronze medalist Igor Ovsyannikov, two-time junior Pan American champion Nishan Randhawa, '16 University World Championship runner-up Yunus Dede and Magomed Zakariev to make the finals, where he was outclassed by '18 U23 European bronze medalist Givi Matcharashvili, claiming the silver medal for the United States.

Moore returned to competition in April 2019, and dropped down to 92 kilograms for the US Open as the fourth seed. After winning his first three matches, notably tech'ing '17 Henri Deglane International champion Timmy McCall, Moore was defeated by Hayden Zillmer in the semifinals, getting thrown to consolations, where he also lost to three–time NCAA DI All-American Timothy Dudley, but finally came back to defeat four-time NCAA DIII National Champion Riley Lefever, placing fifth. At the US World Team Trials of May, Moore tech'd Lefever for the second time, was defeated in a razor close bout against Zillmer, defeated McCall and was shockingly tech'd by Lefever.

On December, Moore competed at the US Senior Nationals, where after defeating '19 NCAA runner-up Derek White '18 Pan American Championship runner-up and '15 NCAA champion Kyven Gadson, he was downed in another closely contested 20-point bout against '15 US University National champion Hayden Zillmer, claiming runner-up honors and qualifying for the '20 US Olympic Team Trials.

==== 2020–2021 ====
Moore was scheduled to compete at the 2020 US Olympic Team Trials on April 4–5, however, the event was postponed along with the Summer Olympics due to the COVID-19 pandemic. After a long lay-off due to the pandemic, Moore came back and flawlessly defeated '14 Pan American Championship bronze medalist and multiple time US Open All-American turned MMA fighter Deron Winn at the Chael Sonnen's Wrestling Underground I, on August.

Moore then demonstrated his improved skills when he claimed the US National Championship on October, defeating '19 Pac-12 Conference champion Nathan Traxler and '19 Dave Schultz Memorial International champion Ty Walz to make the semifinals, avenging his losses over Hayden Zillmer and once again defeating Kyven Gadson. A rematch with Gadson took place at the FloWrestling: Burroughs vs. Valencia card on November, where Gadson was forced to forfeit due to injury early in the match. On December, Moore represented the Ohio RTC at the FloWrestling RTC Cup, where after defeating Ty Walz and Scottie Boykin by technical fall, he was downed by Michael Macchiavello, in a bout where he Moore the edge but committed to his offense and was countered with a late takedown, dropping the match by criteria. He then defeated Hayden Zillmer once again, helping his team place fifth.

To start off the 2021 year, Moore competed at the prestigious Matteo Pellicone Ranking Series on March. In the quarter and semifinals, he took out '19 Junior European Champion Feuzullah Aktürk with ease, and dominated '20 Asian Championship bronze medalist Alisher Yergali to make the finale. In the finals, he faced '19 World Championship runner-up and '18 Asian Games gold medalist Alireza Karimi, and in a razor close match, Moore was able to edge the Iranian on criteria to claim the prestigious championship for the United States.

In April 2–3, Moore competed at the rescheduled US Olympic Team Trials as the top–seed, aside from Kyle Snyder and J'den Cox, as both were sitting out for later in the tournament (Cox would later be pulled from the event). He ran through the challenge bracket, defeating Braxton Amos, Ty Walz and dominantly avenging his last loss to Michael Macchiavello, scoring a flawless technical fall to advance to the best–of–three. In the finals, he faced former teammate and three–time World and Olympic champion Kyle Snyder, whom he was soundly defeated by twice, claiming runner–up honors.

Moore came back at the prestigious Poland Open on June 8, where he placed fifth after going 1–2, suffering losses to the dominant Mohammad Hossein Mohammadian and '19 World Championship runner–up Alireza Karimi in a rematch from their Matteo Pellicone Ranking Series bout.

Moore trimmed back down to 92 kilograms and registered to compete at the 2021 US World Team Trials on September 11–12 as the third-seed, intending to represent the country at the World Championships at his former weight class. After sweeping out the field on his way to the finals, Moore was downed twice in a row by the dominant two-time World Champion J'den Cox, losing the best-of-three series.

==== 2022 ====
In 2022, he won one of the bronze medals in his event at the Yasar Dogu Tournament held in Istanbul, Turkey.

== Freestyle record ==
Senior Freestyle Matches
| Res. | Record | Opponent | Score | Date | Event | Location |
2024 US Olympic Trials (silver) at 97 kg
| Loss | 66-20 | (United States) Isaac Trumble | TF 1–11 | April 19, 2024 | 2024 U.S. Olympic Team Trials | (United States) State College, Pennsylvania |
| Win | 66-19 | (United States) J'den Cox | 2–2 | April 19, 2024 | 2024 U.S. Olympic Team Trials | (United States) State College, Pennsylvania |
| Win | 65-19 | (United States) Nate Jackson | TF 16–6 | April 19, 2024 | 2024 U.S. Olympic Team Trials | (United States) State College, Pennsylvania |
2024 Yaşar Doğu Tournament 5th at 97 kg
| Loss | 64-19 | (Kazakhstan) Rizabek Aitmukhan | 12–14 | March 7, 2024 | 2024 Yaşar Doğu Tournament | (Turkey) Antalya |
| Win | 64-18 | (Mongolia) Ganbaataryn Gankhuyag | 2–0 | March 7, 2024 | 2024 Yaşar Doğu Tournament | (Turkey) Antalya |
| Loss | 63-18 | (Bahrain) Akhmed Tazhudinov | TF 0–11 | March 7, 2024 | 2024 Yaşar Doğu Tournament | (Turkey) Antalya |
| Win | 63-17 | (North Macedonia) Magomedgadji Nurov | 4–1 | March 7, 2024 | 2024 Yaşar Doğu Tournament | (Turkey) Antalya |
2023 Senior Nationals (gold) at 97 kg
| Win | 62-17 | (United States) Nate Jackson | TF 12–2 | December 15, 2023 | 2023 Senior Nationals | (United States) Fort Worth, Texas |
| Win | 61-17 | (United States) Jonathan Aiello | 5–0 | December 15, 2023 | 2023 Senior Nationals | (United States) Fort Worth, Texas |
| Win | 60-17 | (United States) Lou DePrez | TF 14–4 | December 15, 2023 | 2023 Senior Nationals | (United States) Fort Worth, Texas |
| Win | 59-17 | (United States) SirQuinces Stewart | TF 11–0 | December 15, 2023 | 2023 Senior Nationals | (United States) Fort Worth, Texas |
| Win | 58-17 | (United States) Nate Jackson | 11–8 | June 10, 2023 | 2023 Final X Newark – True Third | (United States) Newark, New Jersey |
2023 World Team Trials Challenge Tournament (silver) at 92 kg
| Loss | 57-17 | (United States) Zahid Valencia | TF 1–12 | May 20, 2023 | 2023 World Team Trials Challenge Tournament | (United States) Colorado Springs, Colorado |
| Win | 57-16 | (United States) Jonathan Aiello | 6–2 | May 20, 2023 | 2023 World Team Trials Challenge Tournament | (United States) Colorado Springs, Colorado |
| Win | 56-16 | (United States) Samuel Mitchell | TF 10–0 | May 20, 2023 | 2023 World Team Trials Challenge Tournament | (United States) Colorado Springs, Colorado |
2023 U.S. Open (silver) at 92 kg
| Loss | 55-16 | (United States) Michael Macchiavello | TF 2–12 | April 26, 2023 | 2023 U.S. Open | (United States) Las Vegas |
| Win | 54-15 | (United States) Eric Shultz | TF 10–0 | April 26, 2023 | 2023 U.S. Open | (United States) Las Vegas |
| Win | 53-15 | (United States) John Gunderson | TF 10–0 | April 26, 2023 | 2023 U.S. Open | (United States) Las Vegas |
| Win | 52-15 | (United States) Trillyon Filsaime | TF 10–0 | April 26, 2023 | 2023 U.S. Open | (United States) Las Vegas |
2023 Ibrahim Moustafa (gold) at 92 kg
| Win | | (United States) Nate Jackson | FF | February 23, 2023 | 2023 Ibrahim Moustafa Tournament | Alexandria, Egypt |
| Win | 51-15 | (Egypt) Khaled El-Moatamadawi | TF 11–1 | February 23, 2023 | 2023 Ibrahim Moustafa Tournament | Alexandria, Egypt |
| Win | 50-15 | (Georgia (country)) Miriani Maisuradze | TF 12–2 | February 23, 2023 | 2023 Ibrahim Moustafa Tournament | Alexandria, Egypt |
2023 Grand Prix Zagreb Open (gold) at 92 kg
| Win | 49-15 | (Georgia (country)) Miriani Maisuradze | 4–2 | February 1, 2023 | 2023 Grand Prix Zagreb Open | Zagreb, Croatia |
| Win | 48-15 | (United States) Jonathan Aiello | 6–6 | February 1, 2023 | 2023 Grand Prix Zagreb Open | Zagreb, Croatia |
| Win | 47-15 | (Azerbaijan) Osman Nurmagomedov | 8–3 | February 1, 2023 | 2023 Grand Prix Zagreb Open | Zagreb, Croatia |
2022 US World Team Trials (silver) at 97 kg
| Loss | 46–15 | (United States) Kyle Snyder | TF 2–12 | June 3, 2022 | 2022 Final X: Stillwater | (United States) Stillwater, Oklahoma |
| Loss | 46–15 | (United States) Kyle Snyder | TF 0–11 | June 3, 2022 | 2022 Final X: Stillwater | (United States) Stillwater, Oklahoma |
| Win | 46–14 | (United States) Michael Macchiavello | 6–0 | May 21–22, 2022 | 2022 US World Team Trials Challenge Tournament | (United States) Coralville, Iowa |
| Win | 45–14 | (United States) Michael Macchiavello | TF 10–0 | May 21–22, 2022 | 2022 US World Team Trials Challenge Tournament | (United States) Coralville, Iowa |
| Win | 44–14 | (United States) Timothy Dudley | 7–4 | May 21–22, 2022 | 2022 US World Team Trials Challenge Tournament | (United States) Coralville, Iowa |
| Win | 43–14 | (United States) Jason Carter | TF 10–0 | May 21–22, 2022 | 2022 US World Team Trials Challenge Tournament | (United States) Coralville, Iowa |
| Win | 42–14 | (United States) Nate Jackson | 4–4 | March 16, 2022 | Rudis+: Snyder vs. Cox | (United States) Detroit, Michigan |
2022 Yasar Dogu (bronze) at 97 kg
| Win | 41–14 | (Turkey) Burak Şahin | 3–1 | 26 February 2022 | 2022 Yasar Dogu International | Istanbul, Turkey |
| Loss | 40–14 | (Russia) Alikhan Zhabrailov | 2–8 | 26 February 2022 | 2022 Yasar Dogu International | Istanbul, Turkey |
| Win | 40–13 | (India) Satyawart Kadian | TF 12–1 | 26 February 2022 | 2022 Yasar Dogu International | Istanbul, Turkey |
| Win | 39–13 | (Puerto Rico) Evan Ramos | TF 10–0 | February 12, 2022 | 2022 Bout at the Ballpark | (United States) Arlington, Texas |
2021 US World Team Trials (silver) at 92 kg
| Loss | 38–13 | (United States) J'den Cox | 0–4 | September 12, 2021 | 2021 US World Team Trials | (United States) Lincoln, Nebraska |
| Loss | 38–12 | (United States) J'den Cox | 0–5 | September 12, 2021 | 2021 US World Team Trials | (United States) Lincoln, Nebraska |
| Win | 38–11 | (United States) Nate Jackson | 12–6 | September 11, 2021 | 2021 US World Team Trials | (United States) Lincoln, Nebraska |
| Win | 37–11 | (United States) Trent Hidlay | 5–4 | September 11, 2021 | 2021 US World Team Trials | (United States) Lincoln, Nebraska |
| Win | 36–11 | (United States) Miguel Baray | TF 10–0 | September 11, 2021 | 2021 US World Team Trials | (United States) Lincoln, Nebraska |
2021 Poland Open 5th at 97 kg
| Loss | 35–11 | (Iran) Alireza Karimi | 2–2 | June 8, 2021 | 2021 Poland Open | Warsaw, Poland |
| Win | 35–10 | (Kazakhstan) Serik Bakytkhanov | 8–2 | June 8, 2021 | 2021 Poland Open | Warsaw, Poland |
| Loss | 34–10 | (Iran) Mohammad Hossein Mohammadian | TF 0–11 | June 8, 2021 | 2021 Poland Open | Warsaw, Poland |
2020 US Olympic Team Trials (silver) at 97 kg
| Loss | 34–9 | (United States) Kyle Snyder | 1–5 | April 2–3, 2021 | 2020 US Olympic Team Trials | (United States) Fort Worth, Texas |
| Loss | 34–8 | (United States) Kyle Snyder | TF 0–10 | April 2–3, 2021 | 2020 US Olympic Team Trials | (United States) Fort Worth, Texas |
| Win | 34–7 | (United States) Michael Macchiavello | TF 10–0 | April 2–3, 2021 | 2020 US Olympic Team Trials | (United States) Fort Worth, Texas |
| Win | 33–7 | (United States) Ty Walz | 6–3 | April 2–3, 2021 | 2020 US Olympic Team Trials | (United States) Fort Worth, Texas |
| Win | 32–7 | (United States) Braxton Amos | TF 10–0 | April 2–3, 2021 | 2020 US Olympic Team Trials | (United States) Fort Worth, Texas |
2021 Matteo Pellicone Ranking Series (gold) at 97 kg
| Win | 31–7 | (Iran) Alireza Karimi | 3–3 | March 6, 2021 | Matteo Pellicone Ranking Series 2021 | Rome, Italy |
| Win | 30–7 | (Kazakhstan) Alisher Yergali | 9–0 | March 6, 2021 | Matteo Pellicone Ranking Series 2021 | Rome, Italy |
| Win | 29–7 | (Turkey) Feyzullah Aktürk | TF 12–1 | March 6, 2021 | Matteo Pellicone Ranking Series 2021 | Rome, Italy |
FloWrestling RTC Cup 5th as Ohio RTC at 97 kg
| Win | 28–7 | (United States) Hayden Zillmer | 2–2 | December 4–5, 2020 | FloWrestling RTC Cup | (United States) Austin, Texas |
| Loss | 27–7 | (United States) Michael Macchiavello | 6–6 | December 4–5, 2020 | FloWrestling RTC Cup | (United States) Austin, Texas |
| Win | 27–6 | (United States) Scottie Boykin | TF 10–0 | December 4–5, 2020 | FloWrestling RTC Cup | (United States) Austin, Texas |
| Win | 26–6 | (United States) Ty Walz | TF 10–0 | December 4–5, 2020 | FloWrestling RTC Cup | (United States) Austin, Texas |
| Win | 25–6 | (United States) Kyven Gadson | INJ | November 14, 2020 | FloWrestling: Burroughs vs. Valencia | (United States) Austin, Texas |
2020 US Nationals (gold) at 97 kg
| Win | 24–6 | (United States) Kyven Gadson | 12–5 | October 10–11, 2020 | 2020 US Senior National Championships | (United States) Coralville, Iowa |
| Win | 23–6 | (United States) Hayden Zillmer | 6–5 | October 10–11, 2020 | 2020 US Senior National Championships | (United States) Coralville, Iowa |
| Win | 22–6 | (United States) Ty Walz | 4–4 | October 10–11, 2020 | 2020 US Senior National Championships | (United States) Coralville, Iowa |
| Win | 21–6 | (United States) Nathan Traxler | TF 10–0 | October 10–11, 2020 | 2020 US Senior National Championships | (United States) Coralville, Iowa |
| Win | 20–6 | (United States) Deron Winn | 7–0 | August 30, 2020 | Chael Sonnen's Wrestling Underground I | United States |
2019 US Nationals (silver) at 97 kg
| Loss | 19–6 | (United States) Hayden Zillmer | 10–10 | December 20–22, 2019 | 2019 US Senior Nationals - US Olympic Trials Qualifier | (United States) Fort Worth, Texas |
| Win | 19–5 | (United States) Kyven Gadson | 6–3 | December 20–22, 2019 | 2019 US Senior Nationals - US Olympic Trials Qualifier | (United States) Fort Worth, Texas |
| Win | 18–5 | (United States) Derek White | 6–3 | December 20–22, 2019 | 2019 US Senior Nationals - US Olympic Trials Qualifier | (United States) Fort Worth, Texas |
| Win | 17–5 | (United States) Erik Hinckley | TF 10–0 | December 20–22, 2019 | 2019 US Senior Nationals - US Olympic Trials Qualifier | (United States) Fort Worth, Texas |
2019 US World Team Trials DNP at 92 kg
| Loss | 16–5 | (United States) Riley Lefever | TF 0–11 | May 17–19, 2019 | 2019 US World Team Trials Challenge | (United States) Raleigh, North Carolina |
| Win | 16–4 | (United States) Timmy Mccall | 10–6 | May 17–19, 2019 | 2019 US World Team Trials Challenge | (United States) Raleigh, North Carolina |
| Loss | 15–4 | (United States) Hayden Zillmer | 10–12 | May 17–19, 2019 | 2019 US World Team Trials Challenge | (United States) Raleigh, North Carolina |
| Win | 15–3 | (United States) Riley Lefever | TF 11–0 | May 17–19, 2019 | 2019 US World Team Trials Challenge | (United States) Raleigh, North Carolina |
2019 US Open 5th at 92 kg
| Win | 14–3 | (United States) Riley Lefever | TF 15–4 | April 24–27, 2019 | 2019 US Open National Championships | (United States) Las Vegas, Nevada |
| Loss | 13–3 | (United States) Timothy Dudley | 5–11 | April 24–27, 2019 | 2019 US Open National Championships | (United States) Las Vegas, Nevada |
| Loss | 13–2 | (United States) Hayden Zillmer | 7–12 | April 24–27, 2019 | 2019 US Open National Championships | (United States) Las Vegas, Nevada |
| Win | 13–1 | (United States) Timmy McCall | TF 10–0 | April 24–27, 2019 | 2019 US Open National Championships | (United States) Las Vegas, Nevada |
| Win | 12–1 | (United States) Juan Durazo | TF 10–0 | April 24–27, 2019 | 2019 US Open National Championships | (United States) Las Vegas, Nevada |
| Win | 11–1 | (United States) Gabriel Camarillo | TF 10–0 | April 24–27, 2019 | 2019 US Open National Championships | (United States) Las Vegas, Nevada |
2018 U23 World Championships (silver) at 97 kg
| Loss | 10–1 | (Georgia (country)) Givi Matcharashvili | TF 0–10 | November 12–18, 2018 | 2018 U23 World Championships | Bucharest, Romania |
| Win | 10–0 | (Ukraine) Magomed Zakariev | 10–8 | November 12–18, 2018 | 2018 U23 World Championships | Bucharest, Romania |
| Win | 9–0 | (Turkey) Yunus Emre Dede | TF 11–1 | November 12–18, 2018 | 2018 U23 World Championships | Bucharest, Romania |
| Win | 8–0 | (Canada) Nishan Randhawa | TF 10–0 | November 12–18, 2018 | 2018 U23 World Championships | Bucharest, Romania |
| Win | 7–0 | (Russia) Igor Ovsyannikov | 6–5 | November 12–18, 2018 | 2018 U23 World Championships | Bucharest, Romania |
2018 US U23 Nationals & World Team Trials (gold) at 97 kg
| Win | 6–0 | (United States) Kyle Conel | TF 13–3 | June 1–3, 2018 | 2018 US U23 World Team Trials | (United States) Akron, Ohio |
| Win | 5–0 | (United States) Kyle Conel | TF 12–2 | June 1–3, 2018 | 2018 US U23 World Team Trials | (United States) Akron, Ohio |
| Win | 4–0 | (United States) Malik McDonald | TF 10–0 | June 1–3, 2018 | 2018 US U23 World Team Trials | (United States) Akron, Ohio |
| Win | 3–0 | (United States) Benjamin Honis | 11–8 | June 1–3, 2018 | 2018 US U23 World Team Trials | (United States) Akron, Ohio |
| Win | 2–0 | (United States) Jared Campbell | TF 17–6 | June 1–3, 2018 | 2018 US U23 World Team Trials | (United States) Akron, Ohio |
| Win | 1–0 | (United States) Andrew Jones | TF 10–0 | June 1–3, 2018 | 2018 US U23 World Team Trials | (United States) Akron, Ohio |

== NCAA record ==
NCAA Division I Record
| Res. | Record | Opponent | Score | Date | Event |
End of 2019-2020 Season (senior year)
2020 Big Ten Championships (gold) at 197 lbs
| Win | 110–11 | Eric Schultz | 4–1 | March 7–8, 2020 | 2020 Big Ten Conference Championships |
| Win | 109–11 | Lucas Davison | MD 16–5 | March 7–8, 2020 | 2020 Big Ten Conference Championships |
| Win | 108–11 | Jackson Striggow | MD 18–5 | March 7–8, 2020 | 2020 Big Ten Conference Championships |
| Win | 107–11 | Shakur Rasheed | MD 14–6 | February 15, 2020 | Ohio State - Penn State Dual |
| Win | 106–11 | Lucas Davison | 14–9 | February 9, 2020 | Northwestern - Ohio State Dual |
| Win | 105–11 | Eric Schultz | 6–2 | February 2, 2020 | Ohio State - Nebraska Dual |
| Win | 104–11 | Niko Cappello | Fall | January 31, 2020 | Maryland - Ohio State Dual |
| Win | 103–11 | Hunter Ritter | TF 19–3 | January 26, 2020 | Ohio State - Minnesota Dual |
| Win | 102–11 | Cash Wilcke | 8–3 | January 24, 2020 | Ohio State - Iowa Dual |
| Win | 101–11 | Matt Wroblewski | Fall | January 19, 2020 | Illinois - Ohio State Dual |
| Win | 100–11 | Peter Christensen | TF 21–3 | January 17, 2020 | Ohio State - Wisconsin Dual |
| Win | 99–11 | Jordan Pagano | MD 20–9 | January 10, 2020 | Rutgers - Ohio State Dual |
| Win | 98–11 | Kordell Norfleet | 11–9 | January 6, 2020 | Arizona State - Ohio State Dual |
2019 Cliff Keen Las Vegas Invite (gold) at 197 lbs
| Win | 97–11 | Christian Brunner | MD 16–6 | December 6–7, 2019 | 2019 Cliff Keen Invitational |
| Win | 96–11 | Thomas Lane | TF 16–1 | December 6–7, 2019 | 2019 Cliff Keen Invitational |
| Win | 95–11 | Kordell Norfleet | 5–3 | December 6–7, 2019 | 2019 Cliff Keen Invitational |
| Win | 94–11 | Stan Smeltzer | TF 19–4 | December 6–7, 2019 | 2019 Cliff Keen Invitational |
| Win | 93–11 | Ricardo Rodriguez | Fall | December 6–7, 2019 | 2019 Cliff Keen Invitational |
| Win | 92–11 | Jon Leow | MD 18–6 | December 1, 2019 | Cornell - Ohio State Dual |
| Win | 91–11 | Stanley Smeltzer | TF 24–9 | November 17, 2019 | Virginia Tech - Ohio State Dual |
| Win | 90–11 | Kellan Stout | MD 12–3 | November 15, 2019 | Ohio State - Pittsburgh Dual |
| Win | 89–11 | Nathan Traxler | MD 19–8 | November 10, 2019 | Stanford - Ohio State Dual |
2019 MSU Open (gold) at 197 lbs
| Win | 88–11 | Jakob Woodley | SV–1 6–4 | November 2, 2019 | 2019 Michigan State Open |
| Win | 87–11 | Landon Pelham | TF 21–5 | November 2, 2019 | 2019 Michigan State Open |
| Win | 86–11 | Matt Wroblewski | MD 16–5 | November 2, 2019 | 2019 Michigan State Open |
| Win | 85–11 | Thomas Penola | MD 18–7 | November 2, 2019 | 2019 Michigan State Open |
| Win | 84–11 | Cole Nye | Fall | November 2, 2019 | 2019 Michigan State Open |
Start of 2019-2020 Season (senior year)
End of 2018-2019 Season (junior year)
2019 NCAA Championships (silver) at 197 lbs
| Loss | 83–11 | Bo Nickal | 1–5 | March 21–23, 2019 | 2019 NCAA Division I Wrestling Championships |
| Win | 83–10 | Preston Weigel | MD 12–4 | March 21–23, 2019 | 2019 NCAA Division I Wrestling Championships |
| Win | 82–10 | Tom Sleigh | 17–11 | March 21–23, 2019 | 2019 NCAA Division I Wrestling Championships |
| Win | 81–10 | Jake Woodley | MD 14–4 | March 21–23, 2019 | 2019 NCAA Division I Wrestling Championships |
| Win | 80–10 | Brett Perry | MD 12–3 | March 21–23, 2019 | 2019 NCAA Division I Wrestling Championships |
2019 Big Ten Championships (silver) at 197 lbs
| Loss | 79–10 | Bo Nickal | 3–10 | March 3–4, 2019 | 2019 Big Ten Conference Championships |
| Win | 79–9 | Jacob Warner | 5–2 | March 3–4, 2019 | 2019 Big Ten Conference Championships |
| Win | 78–9 | Dylan Anderson | MD 12–4 | March 3–4, 2019 | 2019 Big Ten Conference Championships |
| Win | 77–9 | Matt Correnti | MD 12–3 | March 3–4, 2019 | 2019 Big Ten Conference Championships |
| Win | 76–9 | Ben Honis | MD 14–4 | February 22, 2019 | Ohio State - Cornell Dual |
| Win | 75–9 | Eric Schultz | SV–1 7–5 | February 17, 2019 | Nebraska - Ohio State Dual |
| Win | 74–9 | Christian Brunner | 12–5 | February 15, 2019 | Ohio State - Purdue Dual |
| Loss | 73–9 | Bo Nickal | Fall | February 8, 2019 | Penn State - Ohio State Dual |
| Win | 73–8 | Zach Chakonis | TF 19–4 | February 3, 2019 | Ohio State - Northwestern Dual |
| Win | 72–8 | Andre Lee | Fall | February 1, 2019 | Ohio State - Illinois Dual |
| Win | 71–8 | Jackson Striggow | 12–5 | January 25, 2019 | Michigan - Ohio State Dual |
| Win | 70–8 | Nick Hinz | Fall | January 13, 2019 | Michigan State - Ohio State Dual |
| Win | 69–8 | Jakob Hinz | Fall | January 11, 2019 | Ohio State - Indiana Dual |
| Win | 68–8 | Malik McDonald | MD 15–6 | January 6, 2019 | North Carolina State - Ohio State Dual |
| Win | 67–8 | Andrew Salemme | Fall | December 9, 2018 | Wisconsin - Ohio State Dual |
2018 Cliff Keen Las Vegas Invite (gold) at 197 lbs
| Win | 66–8 | Eric Schultz | 8–3 | November 30 – December 1, 2018 | 2018 Cliff Keen Las Vegas Invitational |
| Win | 65–8 | Christian Brunner | MD 22–11 | November 30 – December 1, 2018 | 2018 Cliff Keen Las Vegas Invitational |
| Win | 64–8 | Ben Honis | 7–2 | November 30 – December 1, 2018 | 2018 Cliff Keen Las Vegas Invitational |
| Win | 63–8 | Tom Lane | 13–6 | November 30 – December 1, 2018 | 2018 Cliff Keen Las Vegas Invitational |
| Win | 62–8 | Cordell Eaton | MD 12–3 | November 30 – December 1, 2018 | 2018 Cliff Keen Las Vegas Invitational |
| Win | 61–8 | Cale Davidson | MD 17–5 | November 30 – December 1, 2018 | 2018 Cliff Keen Las Vegas Invitational |
Start of 2018-2019 Season (junior year)
End of 2017-2018 Season (sophomore year)
2018 NCAA Championships 4th at 197 lbs
| Loss | 60–8 | Kyle Conel | 3–5 | March 15–17, 2018 | 2018 NCAA Division I Wrestling Championships |
| Win | 60–7 | Ben Darmstadt | 7–4 | March 15–17, 2018 | 2018 NCAA Division I Wrestling Championships |
| Win | 59–7 | Shakur Rasheed | 7–4 | March 15–17, 2018 | 2018 NCAA Division I Wrestling Championships |
| Win | 58–7 | Cash Wilcke | 6–2 | March 15–17, 2018 | 2018 NCAA Division I Wrestling Championships |
| Loss | 57–7 | Kyle Conel | Fall | March 15–17, 2018 | 2018 NCAA Division I Wrestling Championships |
| Win | 57–6 | Christian Brunner | MD 14–4 | March 15–17, 2018 | 2018 NCAA Division I Wrestling Championships |
| Win | 56–6 | Tanner Orndorff | 12–8 | March 15–17, 2018 | 2018 NCAA Division I Wrestling Championships |
2018 Big Ten Championships (gold) at 197 lbs
| Win | 55–6 | Shakur Rasheed | 8–4 | March 3–4, 2018 | 2018 Big Ten Conference Championships |
| Win | 54–6 | Kevin Beazley | 5–3 | March 3–4, 2018 | 2018 Big Ten Conference Championships |
| Win | 53–6 | Eric Schultz | 10–4 | March 3–4, 2018 | 2018 Big Ten Conference Championships |
| Loss | 52–6 | Michael Macchiavello | 5–7 | February 18, 2018 | Ohio State - North Carolina State Dual |
| Win | 52–5 | Kevin Beazley | MD 17–6 | February 11, 2018 | Ohio State - Michigan Dual |
| Loss | 51–5 | Anthony Cassar | 3–6 | February 3, 2018 | Penn State - Ohio State Dual |
| Win | 51–4 | Christian Brunner | TF 18–3 | January 28, 2018 | Purdue - Ohio State Dual |
| Win | 50–4 | Nick May | TF 20–2 | January 26, 2018 | Ohio State - Michigan State Dual |
| Win | 49–4 | Cash Wilcke | 6–3 | January 21, 2018 | Iowa - Ohio State Dual |
| Win | 48–4 | Robert Steveson | 7–4 | January 12, 2018 | Minnesota - Ohio State Dual |
| Win | 47–4 | Anthony Messner | MD 18–7 | January 7, 2018 | Ohio State - Rutgers Dual |
| Win | 46–4 | Mansur Abdul-Malik | Fall | January 5, 2018 | Ohio State - Maryland Dual |
| Win | 45–4 | Scottie Boykin | MD 20–8 | December 17, 2017 | Ohio State - Chattanooga Dual |
| Win | 44–4 | Patrick Brucki | MD 14–4 | December 15, 2017 | Ohio State - Princeton Dual |
| Win | 43–4 | Spencer Irick | MD 14–4 | December 10, 2017 | Indiana - Ohio State Dual |
2017 Cliff Keen Las Vegas Invite (gold) at 197 lbs
| Win | 42–4 | Jared Haught | Fall | December 1–2, 2017 | 2017 Cliff Keen Las Vegas Invitational |
| Win | 41–4 | Matt Williams | 10–4 | December 1–2, 2017 | 2017 Cliff Keen Las Vegas Invitational |
| Win | 40–4 | Hunter Ritter | MD 20–7 | December 1–2, 2017 | 2017 Cliff Keen Las Vegas Invitational |
| Win | 39–4 | Ben Honis | 5–3 | December 1–2, 2017 | 2017 Cliff Keen Las Vegas Invitational |
| Win | 38–4 | Eric Schultz | 3–2 | December 1–2, 2017 | 2017 Cliff Keen Las Vegas Invitational |
| Win | 37–4 | Tanner Orndorff | 15–11 | December 1–2, 2017 | 2017 Cliff Keen Las Vegas Invitational |
| Win | 36–4 | Shane Mast | Fall | November 21, 2017 | Kent State - Ohio State Dual |
| Win | 35–4 | John Kelbly | TF 18–2 | November 21, 2017 | Cleveland State - Ohio State Dual |
| Win | 34–4 | FF | FOR | November 12, 2017 | Arizona State - Ohio State Dual |
Start of 2017-2018 Season (sophomore year)
End of 2016-2017 Season (freshman year)
2017 NCAA Championships (bronze) at 197 lbs
| Win | 33–4 | Jared Haught | Fall | March 16–18, 2017 | 2017 NCAA Division I Wrestling Championships |
| Win | 32–4 | Aaron Studebaker | 8–4 | March 16–18, 2017 | 2017 NCAA Division I Wrestling Championships |
| Loss | 31–4 | Brett Pfarr | 9–13 | March 16–18, 2017 | 2017 NCAA Division I Wrestling Championships |
| Win | 31–3 | Preston Weigel | MD 13–5 | March 16–18, 2017 | 2017 NCAA Division I Wrestling Championships |
| Win | 30–3 | Corey Griego | MD 16–4 | March 16–18, 2017 | 2017 NCAA Division I Wrestling Championships |
| Win | 29–3 | Malik McDonald | MD 16–6 | March 16–18, 2017 | 2017 NCAA Division I Wrestling Championships |
2017 Big Ten Championships (gold) at 197 lbs
| Win | 28–3 | Brett Pfarr | 15–11 | March 4, 2017 | 2017 Big Ten Conference Championships |
| Win | 27–3 | Aaron Studebaker | 10–8 | March 4, 2017 | 2017 Big Ten Conference Championships |
| Win | 26–3 | Cash Wilcke | 10–5 | March 4, 2017 | 2017 Big Ten Conference Championships |
| Win | 25–3 | Jacob Hinz | TF 21–5 | March 4, 2017 | 2017 Big Ten Conference Championships |
| Win | 24–3 | Benjamin Honis | MD 20–9 | February 19, 2017 | Ohio State - Cornell Dual |
| Loss | 23–3 | Brett Pfarr | 5–7 | February 12, 2017 | Ohio State - Minnesota Dual |
| Win | 23–2 | Aaron Studebaker | 3–2 | February 10, 2017 | Ohio State - Nebraska Dual |
| Win | 22–2 | Matt Correnti | MD 16–8 | February 6, 2017 | Rutgers - Ohio State Dual |
| Win | 21–2 | Matt McCutcheon | 9–6 | February 3, 2017 | Penn State - Ohio State Dual |
| Win | 20–2 | Cash Wilcke | MD 19–7 | January 27, 2017 | Ohio State - Iowa Dual |
| Win | 19–2 | David Brian Whisler | MD 17–7 | January 22, 2017 | Maryland - Ohio State Dual |
| Win | 18–2 | Andre Lee | Fall | January 15, 2017 | Illinois - Ohio State Dual |
| Win | 17–2 | Ricky Robertson | MD 12–3 | January 6, 2017 | Ohio State - Wisconsin Dual |
| Win | 16–2 | Jacob Berkowitz | MD 19–9 | December 18, 2016 | Northwestern - Ohio State Dual |
| Loss | 15–2 | J'den Cox | 4–6 | December 8, 2016 | Missouri - Ohio State Dual |
2016 Cliff Keen Las Vegas Invite (bronze) at 197 lbs
| Win | 15–1 | Jacob Smith | 9–7 | December 2, 2016 | 2016 Cliff Keen Las Vegas Invitational |
| Win | 14–1 | Corey Griego | 11–6 | December 2, 2016 | 2016 Cliff Keen Las Vegas Invitational |
| Loss | 13–1 | Brett Pfarr | MD 7–15 | December 2, 2016 | 2016 Cliff Keen Las Vegas Invitational |
| Win | 13–0 | Tanner Orndorff | TF 20–5 | December 2, 2016 | 2016 Cliff Keen Las Vegas Invitational |
| Win | 12–0 | Anthony Mclaughlin | 2–1 | December 2, 2016 | 2016 Cliff Keen Las Vegas Invitational |
| Win | 11–0 | Harley Dilulo | MD 18–7 | December 2, 2016 | 2016 Cliff Keen Las Vegas Invitational |
| Win | 10–0 | Stephen Suglio | TF 21–4 | November 22, 2016 | Ohio State - Arizona State Dual |
| Win | 9–0 | Collin Kelly | Fall | November 22, 2016 | Ohio State - Cleveland State Dual |
| Win | 8–0 | Sullivan Cauley | Fall | November 19, 2016 | Ohio State - Arizona State Dual |
2016 Journeymen Collegiate Classic (gold) at 197 lbs
| Win | 7–0 | Ricky Robertson | 12–11 | November 13, 2016 | 2016 Journeymen Collegiate Classic |
| Win | 6–0 | Freddy Vidal | Fall | November 13, 2016 | 2016 Journeymen Collegiate Classic |
| Win | 5–0 | Nathaniel Rose | Fall | November 13, 2016 | 2016 Journeymen Collegiate Classic |
2016 Eastern Michigan Open (gold) at 197 lbs
| Win | 4–0 | Riley Lefever | 11–6 | November 5, 2016 | 2016 Eastern Michigan Open |
| Win | 3–0 | Austin Severn | 12–6 | November 5, 2016 | 2016 Eastern Michigan Open |
| Win | 2–0 | Jake Kleimola | MD 15–7 | November 5, 2016 | 2016 Eastern Michigan Open |
| Win | 1–0 | Landon Pelham | TF 21–5 | November 5, 2016 | 2016 Eastern Michigan Open |
Start of 2016-2017 Season (freshman year)

=== Stats ===
| Season | Year | School | Rank | Weight Class | Record | Win | Bonus |
|---|---|---|---|---|---|---|---|
| 2020 | Senior | Ohio State University | #1 | 197 | 27–0 | 100.00% | 74.07% |
| 2019 | Junior | Ohio State University | #2 | 197 | 33–3 | 91.67% | 57.69% |
| 2018 | Sophomore | Ohio State University | #4 | 197 | 27–4 | 87.10% | 41.94% |
| 2017 | Freshman | Ohio State University | #3 | 197 | 33–4 | 89.19% | 56.76% |
| Career | | | | | 110–11 | 90.91% | .00% |
