= Yonger Bastida =

Cuban wrestler (born 1999)

Personal information
- Full name: Yonger Pauli Bastida Pomares
- Born: September 19, 1999 (age 27) Trinidad, Cuba

Sport
- Country: Cuba
- Sport: Wrestling
- Weight class: 285 lb (129 kg)
- Events: Freestyle and Folkstyle
- College team: Cyclones
- Coached by: Kevin Dresser
Medal record
Men's freestyle wrestling
Representing Cuba
U23 World Championships
Bronze medal – third place	2019 Budapest	92 kg
U20 World Championships
Silver medal – second place	2019 Tallinn	97 kg
U20 Pan American Championships
Gold medal – first place	2019 Guatemala City	92 kg
Collegiate Wrestling
Representing the Iowa State Cyclones
NCAA Division I Championships
Silver medal – second place	2026 Cleveland	285 lb
Big 12 Championships
Gold medal – first place	2024 Tulsa	285 lb
Gold medal – first place	2026 Tulsa	285 lb

Yonger Pauli Bastida Pomares (born September 19, 1999) is a Cuban freestyle and folkstyle wrestler who competes at heavyweight for the Iowa State Cyclones. In freestyle, he is most notably a U23 and U20 World Championship medalist. In folkstyle, Bastida was a two-time NCAA Division I All-American out of the Iowa State University.

== Early life and career in Cuba ==
Born in Trinidad, Cuba, Bastida became one of the most promising prospects in his native country in 2019, when he broke into the international scene.

Bastida grabbed a silver medal at the Cerro Pelado International, notably defeating NCAA champion Kyven Gadson in the semifinals. Afterwards, he claimed a U20 Pan American Championship title, as well as a silver medal at the U20 World Championships. Lastly, Bastida claimed a bronze medal at the U23 World Championships.

In 2020, Bastida once again grabbed a silver medal at the Cerro Pelado International, notably defeating US National champion Hayden Zillmer before falling to two-time World Champion and Olympic bronze medalist J'den Cox.

== Career in the United States ==
=== College ===
==== 2020–2021 ====
In November 2020, the Iowa State University announced they had recruited Bastida as an international student and a member of the wrestling team.

Bastida earned the varsity spot at 197 pounds when he defeated teammate Cody Fisher by major decision. As a freshman, he would record a 4–4 record during regular season, but would not be chosen as a starter for the post-season.

==== 2021–2022 ====
Showing notable improvements, Bastida recorded upsets over third and sixth-ranked Jacob Warner and Rocky Elam over the regular season. After a fifth-place finish at the Big 12 Championships, Bastida became an All-American with a fifth-place finish at the NCAA National Championships, pulling off multiple upsets and closing up the season with a 25–7 record.

==== 2022–2023 ====
Bastida earned the spot at 197 pounds by beating teammate Rowan Udell by major decision. After multiple duals during the regular season, Bastida placed sixth at the Big 12 Championships, but was not able to place at the NCAA National Championships, closing up the season with a 18–9 record.

==== 2023–2024 ====
Bastida made the move up to heavyweight, and started off the season by pinning teammate Xavier Bruening at the team's wrestle-offs. During regular season, Bastida amassed an undefeated 15–0 mark in dual meets and claimed the Cliff Keen Invitational title.

In the post-season, Bastida claimed the Big 12 Conference title with notable victories over All-Americans Wyatt Hendrickson and Zach Elam. At the NCAA tournament, Bastida reached the quarterfinals, where he was upset by two-time All-American Lucas Davison in a rematch from the Cliff Keen Invitational, and was pushed into the consolation bracket. In the blood-round, he was upset once again by Yaraslau Slavikouski, which eliminated him from the tournament, failing to place.

==== 2026 ====
Bastida lost to Shamil Sharipov by decision at RAF 10 on June 13, 2026.

Bastida was scheduled to face Greg Kerkvliet on October 23, 2026 at RAF 14. However, Kerkvliet withdrew and was replaced by Zachery Elam. Bastida won by decision.

Bastida is scheduled to face Geno Petriashvili on November 28, 2026 at RAF 15.

== Freestyle record ==
Senior Freestyle Matches
Res.	Record	Opponent	Score	Date	Event	Location
Win	8–4	(United States) Zachery Elam	9–1	October 23, 2026	RAF 14	(United States) Las Vegas, Nevada
Loss	7–4	(Bahrain) Shamil Sharipov	3–5	June 13, 2026	RAF 10	(United States) St. Louis, Missouri
2020 Cerro Pelado International (silver) at 97 kg
Loss	7–3	(United States) J'den Cox	TF 1–11	February 14, 2020	2020 Granma y Cerro Pelado	Havana, Cuba
Win	7–2	(United States) Hayden Zillmer	7–4	February 14, 2020	2020 Granma y Cerro Pelado	Havana, Cuba
Win	6–2	(Dominican Republic) Luis Miguel Pérez	TF 11–0	February 14, 2020	2020 Granma y Cerro Pelado	Havana, Cuba
2019 U23 World Championship (bronze) at 92 kg
Win	5–2	(Georgia (country)) Demur Megeneishvili	6–2	October 28 - November 3, 2019	2019 World U23 Wrestling Championship	Budapest, Hungary
Loss	4–2	(Russia) Batyrbek Tsakulov	1–6	October 28 - November 3, 2019	2019 World U23 Wrestling Championship	Budapest, Hungary
Win	4–1	(Hungary) Bendegúz Tóth	TF 13–2	October 28 - November 3, 2019	2019 World U23 Wrestling Championship	Budapest, Hungary
Win	3–1	(Armenia) Sargis Hovsepyan	TF 11–0	October 28 - November 3, 2019	2019 World U23 Wrestling Championship	Budapest, Hungary
Win	2–1	(Poland) Michał Bielawski	Fall	October 28 - November 3, 2019	2019 World U23 Wrestling Championship	Budapest, Hungary
2019 Granma y Cerro Pelado (silver) at 97 kg
Loss	1–1	(Cuba) Reineris Salas	TF 0–10	February 15–23, 2019	2019 Granma y Cerro Pelado	Havana, Cuba
Win	1–0	(United States) Kyven Gadson		February 15–23, 2019	2019 Granma y Cerro Pelado	Havana, Cuba

== NCAA record ==
NCAA Division I Record
Res.	Record	Opponent	Score	Date	Event
End of 2023–2024 Season (junior year)
2024 NCAA Championships DNP at 285 lbs
Loss	71–22	Yaraslau Slavikousk	3–8	March 21–22, 2024	2024 NCAA Division I National Championships
Loss	71–21	Lucas Davison	4–6	March 21–22, 2024	2024 NCAA Division I National Championships
Win	71–20	Lewis Fernandes	TF 20–5	March 21–22, 2024	2024 NCAA Division I National Championships
Win	70–20	Bennett Tabor	Fall	March 21–22, 2024	2024 NCAA Division I National Championships
2024 Big 12 Conference (gold) at 285 lbs
Win	69–20	Wyatt Hendrickson	10–7	March 9–10, 2024	2024 Big 12 Conference Championships
Win	68–20	Zach Elam	MD 11–3	March 9–10, 2024	2024 Big 12 Conference Championships
Win	67–20	Michael Wolfgram	Fall	March 9–10, 2024	2024 Big 12 Conference Championships
Win	66–20	Xavier Doolin	Fall	March 9–10, 2024	2024 Big 12 Conference Championships
Win	65–20	Zach Elam	MD 13–4	February 25, 2024	Missouri - Iowa State Dual
Win	64–20	Adam Ahrendson	TF 25–6	February 11, 2024	Northern Iowa - Iowa State Dual
Win	63–20	Michael Wolfgram	TF 23–8	February 2, 2024	West Virginia - Iowa State Dual
Win	62–20	Konner Doucet	7–2	January 27, 2024	Iowa State - Oklahoma State Dual
Win	61–20	Josh Heindselman	MD 14–4	January 26, 2024	Iowa State - Oklahoma Dual
Win			FF	January 12, 2024	Utah Valley - Iowa State Dual
Win	60–20	Max Acciardi	TF 21–6	January 7, 2024	Iowa State - Cal Baptist Dual
Win	59–20	Cohlton Schultz	4–3	January 5, 2024	Iowa State - Arizona State Dual
Win	58–20	Lewis Fernandes	6–3	December 19, 2023	Iowa State - Cornell Dual
Win	57–20	Josiah Hill	MD 14–4	December 19, 2023	Iowa State - Little Rock Dual
Win	56–20	Dayton Pitzer	6–3	December 19, 2023	Iowa State - Pittsburgh Dual
2023 Cliff Keen Invitational (gold) at 285 lbs
Win	55–20	Lucas Davison	5–3	December 2–3, 2023	2023 Cliff Keen Las Vegas Invitational
Win	54–20	Grady Griess	TF 18–3	December 2–3, 2023	2023 Cliff Keen Las Vegas Invitational
Win	53–20	Nick Feldman	MD 13–5	December 2–3, 2023	2023 Cliff Keen Las Vegas Invitational
Win	52–20	Jack Jessen	11–4	December 2–3, 2023	2023 Cliff Keen Las Vegas Invitational
Win	51–20	Peter Ming	TF 21–6	December 2–3, 2023	2023 Cliff Keen Las Vegas Invitational
Win	50–20	Bradley Hill	MD 17–6	November 26, 2023	Iowa - Iowa State Dual
Win	49–20	Peter Christensen	TF 19–4	November 19, 2023	Wisconsin - Iowa State Dual
Win	48–20	Jake Fernicola	TF 19–4	November 12, 2023	Davidson - Iowa State Dual
Win	47–20	Daniel Bucknavich	TF 26–10	November 5, 2023	Iowa State - Cleveland State Dual
Start of 2023–2024 Season (senior year)
End of 2022–2023 Season (junior year)
2023 NCAA Championships DNP at 197 lbs
Loss	46–20	Michael Beard	1–2	March 16–18, 2023	2023 NCAA Division I National Championships
Win	46–19	Andrew Davison	3–1	March 16–18, 2023	2023 NCAA Division I National Championships
Loss	45–19	Ethan Laird	1–3	March 16–18, 2023	2023 NCAA Division I National Championships
Win	45–18	Evan Bockman	5–2	March 16–18, 2023	2023 NCAA Division I National Championships
2023 Big 12 Conference 6th at 197 lbs
Loss	44–18	Evan Bockman	2–3	March 4–5, 2023	2023 Big 12 Conference Championships
Loss	44–17	Owen Pentz	2–4	March 4–5, 2023	2023 Big 12 Conference Championships
Loss	44–16	Rocky Elam	0–6	March 4–5, 2023	2023 Big 12 Conference Championships
Win	44–15	Evan Bockman	9–5	March 4–5, 2023	2023 Big 12 Conference Championships
Win	43–15	Tyce Raddon	TF 24–9	March 4–5, 2023	2023 Big 12 Conference Championships
Loss	42–15	Rocky Elam	0–4	February 15, 2023	Iowa State - Missouri Dual
Loss	42–14	Zach Braunagel	3–5	February 12, 2023	Illinois - Iowa State Dual
Win	42–13	Wyatt Voelker	12–6	February 10, 2023	Iowa State - Northern Iowa Dual
Loss	41–13	Nino Bonaccorsi	4–6	February 4, 2023	Iowa State - Pittsburgh Dual
Win	41–12	Austin Cooley	MD 17–8	February 3, 2023	Iowa State - West Virginia Dual
Win	40–12	Luke Surber	7–2	January 29, 2023	Oklahoma State - Iowa State Dual
Win	39–12	Evan Bockman	5–3	January 14, 2023	Iowa State - Utah Valley Dual
Win	38–12	Jonathan Fagen	MD 24–11	January 8, 2023	Arizona State - Iowa State Dual
Win	37–12	Guillermo Escobedo	MD 18–7	January 7, 2023	Wyoming - Iowa State Dual
Loss	36–12	Max Dean	1–4	December 20, 2022	Iowa State - Penn State Dual
Win	36–11	Lewis Fernandes	4–2	December 19, 2022	Cornell - Iowa State Dual
Win	35–11	Tanner Harvey	3–2	December 19, 2022	Oregon State - Iowa State Dual
Win	34–11	Jacob Warner	4–3	December 4, 2022	Iowa State - Iowa Dual
Win	33–11	Garavous Kouekabakilaho	MD 21–8	November 20, 2022	Grand View (Iowa) - Iowa State Dual
Win	32–11	Elijah Sobas	TF 22–7	November 12, 2022	Iowa State - Cal Baptist Dual
Win	31–11	Levi Hopkins	MD 16–5	November 5, 2022	Iowa State - Campbell Dual
Win	30–11	Stephen Little	MD 11–3	November 5, 2022	Iowa State - Little Rock Dual
Win	29–11	Braxton Amos	5–3	November 5, 2022	Iowa State - Wisconsin Dual
Start of 2022–2023 Season (junior year)
End of 2021–2022 Season (sophomore year)
2022 NCAA Championships 5th at 197 lbs
Win	28–11	Gavin Hoffman	Fall	March 17–19, 2022	2022 NCAA Division I National Championships
Loss	27–11	Stephen Buchanan	3–4	March 17–19, 2022	2022 NCAA Division I National Championships
Win	27–10	Greg Bulsak	4–3	March 17–19, 2022	2022 NCAA Division I National Championships
Win	26–10	Jake Woodley	5–4	March 17–19, 2022	2022 NCAA Division I National Championships
Win	25–10	Kordell Norfleet	4–2	March 17–19, 2022	2022 NCAA Division I National Championships
Win	24–10	Jaron Smith	11–4	March 17–19, 2022	2022 NCAA Division I National Championships
Loss	23–10	Rocky Elam	0–1	March 17–19, 2022	2022 NCAA Division I National Championships
Win	23–9	Braxton Amos	3–2	March 17–19, 2022	2022 NCAA Division I National Championships
2022 Big 12 Conference 5th at 197 lbs
Win		Owen Pentz	FF	March 5–6, 2022	2022 Big 12 Conference Championships
Loss	22–9	Jake Woodley	0–1	March 5–6, 2022	2022 Big 12 Conference Championships
Loss	22–8	Stephen Buchanan	Fall	March 5–6, 2022	2022 Big 12 Conference Championships
Win	22–7	Rocky Elam	4–3	March 5–6, 2022	2022 Big 12 Conference Championships
Win	21–7	Rocky Elam	SV–1 8–6	February 16, 2022	Iowa State - Missouri Dual
Win	20–7	John Gunderson	MD 21–8	February 11, 2022	Iowa State - Northern Iowa Dual
Win	19–7	Kayne Hutchison	TF 22–6	February 5, 2022	Air Force - Iowa State Dual
Win	18–7	Jackson Moomau	TF 23–8	February 4, 2022	West Virginia - Iowa State Dual
Win	17–7	Gavin Stika	MD 18–6	January 30, 2022	Iowa State - Oklahoma State Dual
Loss	16–7	Jake Woodley	2–4	January 28, 2022	Iowa State - Oklahoma Dual
Win	16–6	Owen Pentz	9–6	January 23, 2022	North Dakota State - Iowa State Dual
Win	15–6	Liam Swanson	Fall	January 16, 2022	Iowa State - Providence (Mont) Dual
Win	14–6	Isaac Bartel	MD 13–5	January 16, 2022	Iowa State - Montana State-Northern Dual
Loss	13–6	Stephen Buchanan	SV–1 4–6	January 14, 2022	Iowa State - Wyoming Dual
Win	13–5	Josh Loomer	TF 20–5	January 12, 2022	CSU Bakersfield - Iowa State Dual
Win	12–5	Jayshon Hines	Fall	January 6, 2022	Northwest Kansas TC - Iowa State Dual
Win	11–5	Thomas Penola	6–4	December 19, 2021	Purdue - Iowa State Dual
Win	10–5	Jacob Warner	4–2	December 5, 2021	Iowa - Iowa State Dual
Win	9–5	Arick Lopez	TF 23–8	November 27, 2021	Cal Baptist - Iowa State Dual
Win	8–5	Jack Brown	4–3	November 27, 2021	Army - Iowa State Dual
2021 Daktronics Open (bronze) at 197 lbs
Win	7–5	Bennett Tabor	TF 18–3	November 21, 2021	2021 Daktronics Open
Win	6–5	Spencer Mooberry	MD 16–5	November 21, 2021	2021 Daktronics Open
Loss	5–5	Silas Allred	Fall	November 21, 2021	2021 Daktronics Open
Win	5–4	Cody Donnelly	MD 19–5	November 21, 2021	2021 Daktronics Open
Start of 2021–2022 Season (sophomore year)
End of 2020–2021 Season (freshman year)
Loss	4–4	Kordell Norfleet	MD 7–17	February 14, 2021	Arizona State - Iowa State Dual
Loss	4–3	A.J. Ferrari	2–5	January 30, 2021	Oklahoma State - Iowa State Dual
Win	4–2	Jesus Gutierrez	Fall	January 30, 2021	Iowa Central CC - Iowa State Dual
Loss	3–2	Jake Woodley	MD 0–12	January 24, 2021	Oklahoma - Iowa State Dual
Loss	3–1	Rocky Elam	4–5	January 17, 2021	Missouri - Iowa State Dual
Win	3–0	Joe Reimers	Fall	January 10, 2021	Nebraska-Kearney - Iowa State Dual
Win	2–0	Brady Vogel	MD 18–8	January 10, 2021	Loras - Iowa State Dual
Win	1–0	Kobe Woods	15–8	January 3, 2021	Wartburg - Iowa State Dual
Start of 2020–2021 Season (freshman year)

=== Stats ===
Season	Year	School	Rank	Weigh Class	Record	Win
2024	Senior	Iowa State University	#2	285	25–2	92.59%
2023	Junior	Iowa State University	#19 (DNP)	197	18–9	66.67%
2022	Sophomore	Iowa State University	#9 (5th)	197	24–7	77.42%
2021	Freshman	Iowa State University	#159	197	4–4	50.00%
Career					71–22	76.34%
