= Chael Sonnen's Wrestling Underground =

US amateur wrestling promotion company

- Company type: Private
- Industry: Amateur wrestling promotion Tournament Competition
- Founded: 2020; 6 years ago
- Founders: Chael Sonnen
- Headquarters: Oregon, United States
- Key people: Chael Sonnen

Chael Sonnen's Wrestling Underground is an amateur wrestling promotion company based on Oregon, United States, and run by Chael Sonnen. The promotion made its debut on August 30, 2020, via UFC Fight Pass.

== Ruleset ==
Despite the events being held inside an octagon, the rules remain similar to the traditional freestyle and Greco-Roman (which are provided by United World Wrestling), as per stated by the promotion's founder Chael Sonnen and seen in the first card held.

== Event list ==
=== Wrestling Underground I ===
Wrestling Underground 1
- Promotion: Chael Sonnen's Wrestling Underground
- Date: August 30, 2020
- Venue: Undisclosed
- City: Northwestern United States
- Attendance: None (behind closed doors)

Chael Sonnen's Wrestling Underground I was an amateur wrestling event that took place on August 30, 2020 at an undisclosed location in the Pacific Northwest. Also the first card in the history of the company, it was aired on UFC Fight Pass.

Card

Wrestling Underground I
Weight Class					Method	Round	Time	Notes
Heavyweight	FS	(United States) Nick Gwiazdowski	def.	(United States) Kyven Gadson	TF. 10-0	1	2:41	
Catchweight 185 lbs	FS	(United States) David McFadden	def.	(United States) Tommy Gantt	Dec. 8-4	2	3:00	McFadden replaced Mark Hall on short notice.
Catchweight 213 lbs	FS	(United States) Kollin Moore	def.	(United States) Deron Winn	Dec. 7-0	2	3:00	
Catchweight 190 lbs	FS	(United States) Sammy Brooks	def.	(United States) Shakur Rasheed	Dec. 8-6	2	3:00	
Catchweight 180 lbs	GR	(United States) Ben Provisor	def.	(United States) RaVaughn Perkins	Dec. 10-9	2	3:00	
Catchweight 159 lbs	FS	(United States) Tyler Berger	def.	(United States) Joey McKenna	Dec. 8-2	2	3:00	
