= Stephen Buchanan (wrestler) =

American wrestler (born 2000)

Personal information
- Born: November 30, 2000 (age 25) Owen, Wisconsin, U.S.
- Home town: Loyal, Wisconsin, U.S.
- Weight: 97 kg (214 lb)

Sport
- Country: United States
- Sport: Wrestling
- Events: Freestyle and Folkstyle
- College team: Iowa; Oklahoma; Wyoming
- Club: Hawkeye Wrestling Club
- Coached by: Tom Brands; Terry Brands
Medal record
Men's freestyle wrestling
Representing United States
Pan American Championships
Silver medal – second place	2026 Coralville	97 kg
Grand Prix
Gold medal – first place	2026 Nice	97 kg
Gold medal – first place	2026 Zagreb	97 kg
Men's collegiate wrestling
NCAA Division I Championships
Gold medal – first place	2025 Philadelphia	197 lb
Bronze medal – third place	2022 Detroit	197 lb
Bronze medal – third place	2024 Kansas City	197 lb
Big Ten Championships
Silver medal – second place	2025 Evanston	197 lb
Big 12 Championships
Gold medal – first place	2022 Tulsa	197 lb
Silver medal – second place	2021 Tulsa	197 lb
Bronze medal – third place	2024 Tulsa	197 lb

Stephen Buchanan II (born November 30, 2000) is an American freestyle and folkstyle wrestler who competes at 97 kilograms. A five-time NCAA Division I qualifier, Buchanan was a four-time NCAA All-American and the 2025 NCAA national champion at 197 lb.

== Career ==
=== High school ===
Buchanan attended Loyal High School in Loyal, Wisconsin. Buchanan finished his high school career with a 184–16 record, winning two Wisconsin Division 2 state titles. Buchanan committed to attend the University of Wyoming.

=== Wyoming ===
==== 2019–2020 ====
Buchanan earned the starting 197 lb. role as a true freshman for Wyoming. Buchanan tallied a 26–13 record, taking seventh at the Big 12 tournament. Buchanan received an at large bid, qualifying for the 2020 NCAA Wrestling Tournament, which was canceled due to the COVID-19 pandemic. Buchanan led Wyoming with 36 takedowns during dual action.

==== 2020–2021 ====
Buchanan returned to the Wyoming lineup at 197 lb. as a sophomore. Buchanan finished second at the Big 12 Tournament, falling to Oklahoma State's AJ Ferrari 13–8 in the final. With a second-place finish, Buchanan punched his ticket to the 2021 NCAA Division I Wrestling Championships. Buchanan finished the NCAA championships with a 3–3 record, finishing in eighth and receiving All-American honors. Buchanan became Wyoming's first All-American since 2018.

==== 2021–2022 ====
In his third year as the Cowboys' starter at 197 lb., Buchanan captured his first Big 12 title, defeating South Dakota State's Tanner Sloan 3–2 in the final. Buchanan became Wyoming's fourth Big 12 champion in program history. After notching three straight decision victories to open his 2022 NCAA Division I Wrestling Championships campaign, including a 4–0 win over conference rival Rocky Elam of Missouri, Buchanan fell in the semifinals to Iowa's Jacob Warner 6–4. Buchanan rebounded with wins over Iowa State's Yonger Bastida and Missouri's Rocky Elam to finish third.

=== Oklahoma ===
==== 2023–2024 ====
After three years at Wyoming, Buchanan transferred to Oklahoma. Buchanan redshirted the 2022–2023 season before returning to the lineup as a redshirt junior. Buchanan finished in third place at the 2023 Big 12 championships, falling to Missouri's Rocky Elam 5–4 in the opening round before rattling off three straight wins. Buchanan received All-America honors for the third time with a third-place finish at the 2024 NCAA Division I Wrestling Championships. After falling to reigning champion Aaron Brooks, Buchanan rattled off four consecutive wins, finishing with a 9–4 win over Cornell's Jacob Cardenas.

=== Iowa ===
==== 2024–2025 ====
Buchanan committed to the University of Iowa to finish his college career. Buchanan punched his ticket to the NCAA tournament with a runner-up finish at the 2025 Big 10 Championships at 197 lb. Buchanan reached the tournament finals, where he fell to Michigan's Jacob Cardenas. He later became the first athlete to be an All-American at three different schools. Buchanan entered the 2025 NCAA Tournament as the second seed. Buchanan reached the semi-finals with three bonus point wins, including a major decision over Michigan State's Remy Cotton and technical falls over Wyoming's Joey Novak and Ohio State's Seth Shumate. In the semifinals, Buchanan defeated former national champion AJ Ferrari of Cal State-Bakersfield 3–0. In the national final, Buchanan defeated Penn State's Josh Barr 5–2 to capture his first national championship. Buchanan finished the season with a 26–1 record.

=== Freestyle ===
After graduating, Buchanan continued his wrestling career in Iowa, joining the Hawkeye Wrestling Club to launch his freestyle career.

He signed with Real American Freestyle and made his debut at RAF 05 on January 10, 2026, defeating former mixed martial artist and freestyle Olympic medalist Yoel Romero via technical fall 10–0. He then lost a criteria decision to Givi Matcharashvili at RAF 06 on February 28, 2026. This fight earned him a Match of the Night award.

Buchanan was named USA Wrestling Athlete of the Week on January 21, 2026 after he made his international debut and won gold at the Grand Prix de France Henri Deglane at 97 kg. He then won gold at the Grand Prix Zagreb Open at 97 kg, defeating former Olympic champion and three-time world champion Hassan Yazdani in the finals by technical fall.

He won the 2026 US Open at 97 kg, qualifying him for Final X in June. He won silver at the 2026 Pan American Wrestling Championships at 97 kg, losing in the final to Cuban wrestler Arturo Silot.

== Freestyle record ==
Senior Freestyle Matches
Res.	Record	Opponent	Score	Date	Event	Location
2026 US World Team Trials (silver) at 97 kg
Loss	16–5	(United States) Kyle Snyder	3–9	June 19, 2026	2026 Final X	(United States) Newark, New Jersey
Win	16–4	(United States) Kyle Snyder	5–5	June 19, 2026	2026 Final X	(United States) Newark, New Jersey
Loss	15–4	(United States) Kyle Snyder	2–5	June 19, 2026	2026 Final X	(United States) Newark, New Jersey
2026 Pan American Championships (silver) at 97 kg
Loss	15–3	(Cuba) Arturo Silot	TF 4–14	May 10, 2026	2026 Pan American Wrestling Championships	(United States) Coralville, Iowa
Win	15–2	(Venezuela) Cristian Sarco	TF 11–1	May 10, 2026	2026 Pan American Wrestling Championships	(United States) Coralville, Iowa
Win	14–2	(Jamaica) Steven Burrell	TF 12–2	May 10, 2026	2026 Pan American Wrestling Championships	(United States) Coralville, Iowa
2026 US Open (gold) at 97 kg
Win	13–2	(United States) Hayden Zillmer	5–3	April 24–25, 2026	2026 US Open National Championships	(United States) Las Vegas, Nevada
Win	12–2	(United States) Justin Rademacher	TF 10–0	April 24–25, 2026	2026 US Open National Championships	(United States) Las Vegas, Nevada
Win	11–2	(United States) Sonny Sasso	Fall	April 24–25, 2026	2026 US Open National Championships	(United States) Las Vegas, Nevada
Win	10–2	(United States) Martin Cosgrove	TF 12–1	April 24–25, 2026	2026 US Open National Championships	(United States) Las Vegas, Nevada
Loss	9–2	(Georgia (country)) Givi Matcharashvili	3–3	February 28, 2026	RAF 06	(United States) Tempe, Arizona
2026 Grand Prix Zagreb Open (gold) at 97 kg
Win	9–1	(Iran) Hassan Yazdani	TF 13–3	February 5, 2026	2026 Grand Prix Zagreb Open	Zagreb, Croatia
Win	8–1	(France) Adlan Viskhanov	Fall	February 5, 2026	2026 Grand Prix Zagreb Open	Zagreb, Croatia
Win	7–1	(India) Vicky Hooda	14–7	February 5, 2026	2026 Grand Prix Zagreb Open	Zagreb, Croatia
Win	6–1	(Canada) Sam Pereira	TF 12–1	February 5, 2026	2026 Grand Prix Zagreb Open	Zagreb, Croatia
2026 Henri Deglane Grand Prix (gold) at 97 kg
Win	5–1	(Moldova) Radu Lefter	TF 11–0	January 16–18, 2026	2026 Henri Deglane Grand Prix	Nice, France
Win	4–1	(France) Adlan Viskhanov	8–5	January 16–18, 2026	2026 Henri Deglane Grand Prix	Nice, France
Win	3–1	(Georgia (country)) Ramini Gulitashvili	TF 13–2	January 16–18, 2026	2026 Henri Deglane Grand Prix	Nice, France
Win	2–1	(Cuba) Yoel Romero	TF 10–0	January 10, 2026	RAF 05	(United States) Sunrise, Florida
2023 US Open DNP at 92 kg
Loss		(United States) Zachary Peterson	FF	May 17, 2025	2023 US Open National Championships	(United States) Las Vegas, Nevada
Loss	1–1	(United States) Jacob Cardenas	VIN	May 17, 2025	2023 US Open National Championships	(United States) Las Vegas, Nevada
Win	1–0	(United States) Krystian Kinsey	TF 11–0	May 17, 2025	2023 US Open National Championships	(United States) Las Vegas, Nevada
