= AJ Ferrari =

American wrestler (born 2001)

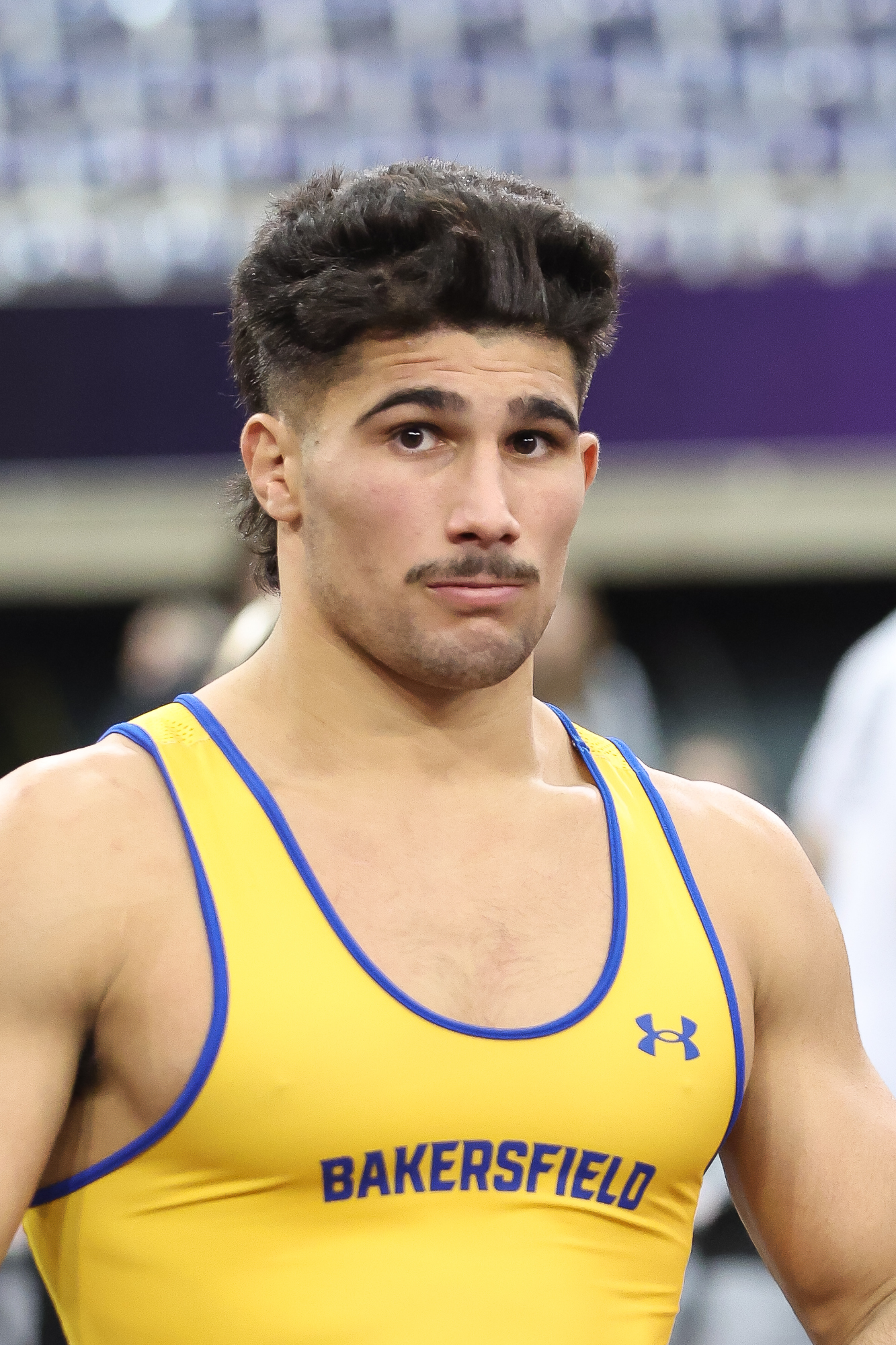
- Ferrari in January 2025, competing for CSU-Bakersfield

Personal information
- Full name: Albert James Ferrari
- Nickname: Mr. Fast Twitch
- Born: July 24, 2001 (age 25) Dallas, Texas, U.S.
- Height: 6 ft 0 in (183 cm)
- Weight: 197 lb (Folkstyle)

Sport
- Country: United States
- Sport: Wrestling
- Events: Freestyle; Folkstyle
- College team: Oklahoma State University (2020–2021); Cal State Bakersfield (2024–2025) University of Nebraska (2025)
Medal record
Representing the United States
Men's freestyle wrestling
U17 World Championships
Bronze medal – third place	2018 Zagreb	92 kg
Men's collegiate wrestling
Representing the Oklahoma State Cowboys
NCAA Division I Championships
Gold medal – first place	2021 St. Louis	197 lb
Big 12 Championships
Gold medal – first place	2021 Tulsa	197 lb
Representing the Cal State Bakersfield Roadrunners
NCAA Division I Championships
Bronze medal – third place	2025 Philadelphia	197 lb
Pac-12 Championships
Gold medal – first place	2025 Corvallis	197 lb

Albert “AJ” Ferrari (born July 24, 2001) is an American freestyle wrestler and folkstyle wrestler who has competed internationally at 92 kilograms and collegiately at 197 pounds and heavyweight. He was previously signed by the WWE under its NIL (Next in Line) program. In freestyle, he claimed a bronze medal at the 2018 Cadet World Championships and was the 2020 U.S. junior national champion.

In folkstyle, Ferrari was the top-ranked high school wrestler at the time of his commitment to Oklahoma State University, where he was an NCAA Division I national champion and Big 12 Conference champion in 2021. In 2024, he committed to Cal State Bakersfield, where he was a Pac-12 champion and All-American, placing third at the NCAA Division I championships, before transferring to Nebraska.

== Amateur wrestling career ==
=== High school ===
Born and raised in Texas, Ferrari first attended Allen High School, where he became a two-time Texas state champion and claimed a Walsh Jesuit Ironman title, as well as a Cadet Fargo National Championship in freestyle wrestling. In 2018, Ferrari claimed a Cadet World Championship bronze medal before he and his family moved to New Jersey, where he attended Blair Academy as the top-ranked 195-pounder in the country.

While at Blair, he claimed a Beast of the East title by beating the second-ranked wrestler in the nation Jacob Cardenas (helping to the team title) and another Ironman title (also helping to the team title). He then transferred to Bergen Catholic High School, where he was also dominant but not eligible to compete in the postseason, like at Blair. After that, he moved back to Allen, Texas, where his senior year was derailed by an ankle injury. In 2020, Ferrari claimed the U.S. junior national championship in freestyle.

=== College ===
In October 2019, Ferrari, the top recruit in the country, committed to Oklahoma State, over Rutgers, Penn State, Nebraska, and Ohio State.

==== 2020–2021 ====
During regular season, Ferrari compiled a 12–1 record, with his only loss to Noah Adams from West Virginia. Entering the postseason, Ferrari ran through the bracket to claim his first Big 12 Conference title, the first true freshman to be named the Most Outstanding Wrestler of the tournament since 2005. At the NCAAs, Ferrari, the fourth seed, won three matches to make the semifinals, notably defeating All-American Jacob Warner from Iowa and highly ranked Tanner Sloan before facing Olympian and Big Ten champion Myles Amine. Ferrari soundly defeated the three-time All-American to advance to the final. In the finale, he defeated Nino Bonaccorsi from Pittsburgh, becoming an NCAA champion as a true freshman, the third in Cowboys history.

In April, Ferrari bumped up 17 pounds to make his senior freestyle debut at age 19 at the rescheduled US Olympic Team Trials in April 1–3 as the sixth seed at 97 kilograms, attempting to represent the United States at the 2020 Summer Olympics. In the first round, he was defeated by 2018 NCAA champion Michael Macchiavello, and lost controversially to 2019 graduate Ben Honis in the consolation bracket.

==== 2021–2022 ====
With an undefeated 10–0 record midway through the season, Ferrari and Oklahoma State cross country runner Isai Rodriguez were involved in a serious car accident where Ferrari's car was completely destroyed. Ferrari was airlifted to OU Health in Oklahoma City for treatment for internal bleeding and fluid on his lungs. Ferrari withdrew from the rest of the season because his injuries required surgery.

== Mixed martial arts career ==
Ferrari is preparing for a transition to mixed martial arts and has been training in various striking martial arts and Brazilian jiu-jitsu alongside Rodolfo Vieira and Jorge Masvidal from American Top Team.

== Personal life ==
Ferrari is from Allen, Texas, and started wrestling after the family's move to Dallas. Ferrari's family is Italian American.

=== Criminal charges ===
On July 5, 2022, a woman filed for an emergency protective order against Ferrari, alleging he sexually assaulted her three days earlier in her home. On July 14, Oklahoma State confirmed Ferrari had left its wrestling team. An hour later, the Stillwater Police Department announced Ferrari was under investigation for sexual assault. On August 3, 2022, Ferrari was charged with felony sexual battery in Payne County District Court. The case was dismissed on October 6, 2023, in Payne County District Court.

On January 10, 2026, Ferrari was booked in Lancaster County Jail in Nebraska on an "outstanding arrest warrant" which allegedly included him evading arrest in Texas in October 2025. On January 14, 2026, these charges, which also involved an attempt to extradite Ferrari to Texas, were dismissed with prejudice.

On June 27, 2026, Ferrari was booked for driving 110 miles per hour in a 55-mile per hour zone and evading arrest by fleeing on foot. He was later released on bond.

On July 7, 2026, Ferrari was arrested on multiple felony counts. It was alleged that he had strangled a pregnant woman. On July 8, a local judge set a bond of $200,000 upon his arraignment.

== Freestyle record ==
Senior Freestyle Matches
Res.	Record	Opponent	Score	Date	Event	Location
2020 US Olympic Team Trials DNP at 97 kg
Loss	0–2	(United States) Ben Honis	10–11	April 2–3, 2021	2020 US Olympic Team Trials	(United States) Fort Worth, Texas
Loss	0–1	(United States) Mike Macchiavello	1–3	April 2–3, 2021	2020 US Olympic Team Trials	(United States) Fort Worth, Texas

== NCAA record ==
NCAA Division I Record
Res.	Record	Opponent	Score	Date	Event
Start of 2024–2025 Season (redshirt sophomore year)
End of 2023–2024 Season (Olympic redshirt)
DQ		Zach Glazier		December 30, 2023	
Start of 2023–2024 Season (Olympic redshirt)
End of 2022–2023 Season (redshirt)
Start of 2022–2023 Season (redshirt)
End of 2021–2022 Season (freshman year)
Win	30–1	TJ Davis	MD 12–2	January 23, 2022	Lehigh - Oklahoma State Dual
Win	29–1	Sam Wustefeld	Fall	January 16, 2022	Columbia - Oklahoma State Dual
Win	28–1	Brooks Sacharczyk	Fall	January 8, 2022	Oklahoma State - Little Rock Dual
Win	27–1	Evan Bockman	6–3	December 20, 2021	Oklahoma State - Utah Valley Dual
Win	26–1	Stephen Buchanan	4–2	December 17, 2021	Oklahoma State - Wyoming Dual
Win	25–1	Kayne Hutchison	TF 19–4	December 17, 2021	Oklahoma State - Air Force Dual
Win	24–1	Jake Woodley	6–3	December 12, 2021	Oklahoma State - Oklahoma Dual
Win	23–1	Santino Morina	TF 17–2	November 28, 2021	Drexel - Oklahoma State Dual
Win	22–1	Michial Foy	MD 12–4	November 20, 2021	Oklahoma State - Minnesota Dual
Win	21–1	Nick Stemmet	MD 16–3	November 13, 2021	Stanford - Oklahoma State Dual
Start of 2021–2022 Season (freshman year)
End of 2020–2021 Season (freshman covid year)
2021 NCAA Championships (gold) at 197 lbs
Win	20–1	Nino Bonaccorsi	4–2	March 18–20, 2021	2021 NCAA Division I Wrestling Championships
Win	19–1	Myles Amine	5–1	March 18–20, 2021	2021 NCAA Division I Wrestling Championships
Win	18–1	Jacob Warner	3–2	March 18–20, 2021	2021 NCAA Division I Wrestling Championships
Win	17–1	Tanner Sloan	5–0	March 18–20, 2021	2021 NCAA Division I Wrestling Championships
Win	16–1	Colin Mccracken	TF 18–2	March 18–20, 2021	2021 NCAA Division I Wrestling Championships
2021 Big 12 Conference (gold) at 197 lbs
Win	15–1	Stephen Buchanan	6–1	March 6–7, 2021	2021 Big 12 Conference Championships
Win	14–1	Tanner Sloan	7–1	March 6–7, 2021	2021 Big 12 Conference Championships
Win	13–1	Jake Woodley	8–4	March 6–7, 2021	2021 Big 12 Conference Championships
Win	12–1	Jake Woodley	4–1	February 21, 2021	Oklahoma - Oklahoma State Dual
2021 Cowboy Challenge Tournament (bronze) at 197 lbs
Win	11–1	Luke Surber	MFOR	February 14, 2021	2021 Cowboy Challenge Tournament
Loss	10–1	Noah Adams	2–3	February 14, 2021	2021 Cowboy Challenge Tournament
Win	10–0	Jace Punke	TF 17–1	February 14, 2021	2021 Cowboy Challenge Tournament
Win	9–0	Dylan Johnson	Fall	February 7, 2021	Little Rock - Oklahoma State Dual
Win	8–0	Jake Woodley	3–2	February 7, 2021	Oklahoma - Oklahoma State Dual
Win	7–0	Yonger Bastida	5–2	January 30, 2021	Oklahoma State - Iowa State Dual
Win	6–0	Kegan Moore	10–4	January 30, 2021	Oklahoma State - Northern Iowa Dual
Win	5–0	Kayne Hutchison	TF 20–5	January 22, 2021	Oklahoma State - Air Force Dual
Win	4–0	Dylan Johnson	TF 22–7	January 17, 2021	Oklahoma State - Little Rock Dual
Win	3–0	Austin Andres	TF 18–2	January 17, 2021	Oklahoma State - Southern Illinois Edwardsville Dual
Win	2–0	JJ Dixon	MD 16–3	January 10, 2021	Oregon State - Oklahoma State Dual
Win	1–0	Logan Andrew	MD 16–5	January 10, 2021	Chattanooga - Oklahoma State Dual
Start of 2020–2021 Season (freshman covid year)

=== College stats ===
Season	Year	School	Rank	Weigh Class	Record	Win	Bonus
2025	Redshirt Sophomore	Cal State Bakersfield Roadrunners	#3 (3rd)	197	21–1	95.45%	60.87%
2024	Olympic Redshirt	Unattached	NR	197	0–0	0%	0%
2023	Redshirt	Unattached	NR	197	0–0	0%	0%
2022	Freshman	Oklahoma State Cowboys	#1 (DNC)	197	10–0	100.00%	70.00%
2021	Freshman (Covid Year)	Oklahoma State Cowboys	#4 (1st)	197	20–1	95.24%	38.10%
Career					51–2	96.22%	54.60%
