= Kyven Gadson =

American freestyle wrestler

- Born: July 9, 1992 (age 34); Iowa City, Iowa, U.S.
- High school: Waterloo East (IA)
- State championships: 2 (Iowa)
- College: Iowa State University
- NCAA championships: 1 (2015, 197 lb)
Medal record
Representing the United States
Men's freestyle wrestling
World Cup
Bronze medal – third place	2019 Yakutsk	Team
US Open Championships
Gold medal – first place	2017 Las Vegas	97 kg
Gold medal – first place	2019 Las Vegas	97 kg
Bronze medal – third place	2016 Las Vegas	97 kg
University National Championships
Gold medal – first place	2016 Akron	97 kg
Men's collegiate wrestling
Representing the Iowa State Cyclones
NCAA Division I Championships
Gold medal – first place	2015 St. Louis	197 lb
Big 12 Championships
Gold medal – first place	2013 Stillwater	197 lb
Gold medal – first place	2014 Norman	197 lb
Gold medal – first place	2015 Ames	197 lb

Kyven Ross Gadson (born July 9, 1992) is an American amateur wrestler. Currently a senior competitor in amateur freestyle wrestling, earlier Gadson, while wrestling for the Iowa State Cyclones, was a three-time All-American in NCAA Division I collegiate wrestling and won the 2015 NCAA Division I Wrestling Championships in the 197-lb weight class by pinning future Olympic and World Championship gold medalist Kyle Snyder in his final collegiate match.

== High school wrestling career ==
Wrestling for Waterloo East High School in Waterloo, Iowa, Gadson compiled a prep record of 113-12. In his sophomore season, he finished as the runner-up at the Iowa state wrestling tournament in the 145-lb weight class. Gadson was undefeated in both a junior and senior, winning the Iowa state wrestling tournament in the 171-lb and 189-lb weight classes, respectively. He finished his senior season ranked as the sixth-best high school wrestler in the nation at the 189-lb weight class by both the Amateur Wrestling News (AWN) and Intermat. In high school, Gadson was coached by his father William "Willie" Gadson, a former Iowa State Cyclone NCAA Division I collegiate wrestling All-American. His performance in 2010 earned him the Junior Schalles Award for top high school pinner.

Additionally, Gadson was the 2011 FILA Junior freestyle national champion at 96-kg, 2009 FILA Cadet freestyle national champion at 85-kg, the 2009 Northern Plains Junior Freestyle champion, the ASICS Folkstyle Nationals champion at 152-lb in 2008, the runner-up in the 2008 USAW Preseason Nationals, finished fifth at the 2007 USAW Cadet Folkstyle Nationals, and was a Greco-Roman and freestyle state champion as a high school sophomore.

== Collegiate wrestling career ==
During the 2010-11 season of NCAA Division I collegiate wrestling for the Iowa State Cyclones (ISU), Gadson redshirted. While wrestling unattached, Gadson was the Harold Nichols Cyclone Open tournament champion.

During the 2011-12 season, Gadson's redshirt freshman collegiate wrestling season was cut short by an injury to his shoulder suffered in the first period of his first match wrestling for the Cyclones against Keldrick Hall in a dual meet against the Oklahoma Sooners. While he would almost assuredly have qualified for a medical hardship redshirt due to being unable to compete in (far) less than 25 percent of the competitive season as a redshirt freshman, Gadson ultimately decided to forego the opportunity for another season of collegiate wrestling that a medical hardship redshirt would have afforded.

During the 2012-13 season, Gadson finished his redshirt sophomore season as an All-American by finishing in sixth place at the 2013 NCAA Division I Wrestling Championships in the 197-lb weight class. Additionally, Gadson was the 197-lb Big 12 Conference champion and the runner-up at the UNI Open due to a forfeit in the championship match for injury concerns. In recognition of Gadson's athletic achievements while returning from a season-ending injury a year earlier, he was recognized as the Amateur Wrestling News (AWN) Comeback Wrestler of the Year and the AWN Courage Award winner, as well as the ISU Outstanding Wrestler and ISU Total Commitment Award winner.

During the 2013-14 season, Gadson finished his redshirt junior season as an All-American by finishing in fourth place at the 2014 NCAA Division I Wrestling Championships in the 197- lb weight class. Additionally, Gadson was the 197-lb Big 12 Conference champion, the Southern Scuffle tournament runner-up, and the Harold Nichols Cyclone Open tournament runner-up. Also, he was an Academic All-Big 12 First-Team member.

During the 2014-15 season, Gadson finished his redshirt senior season as the 2015 NCAA Division I Wrestling Champion in the 197-lb weight class by pinning future Olympic and World Championship gold medalist Kyle Snyder in his final collegiate match. Additionally, Gadson was the 197-lb Big 12 Conference champion, the Cliff Keen Las Vegas Invitational champion, and Kaye Young Open tournament champion. Also, he was an Academic All-Big 12 First-Team member.

== Freestyle wrestling career ==
Gadson is currently the second-ranked American freestyle wrestler at the 97-kg (214-lb) weight class after Olympic and World Championship gold medalist Kyle Snyder. As a senior freestyle wrestler, he is the 2019 U.S. Open champion, and 2019 World Cup bronze medalist, going 3-1 at 97 kg. In 2018 he won the World Team Trials Challenge, qualifying for Final X. Gadson was the 2017 U.S. Open champion, finishing second at the 2017 U.S. World Team Trials. At International meets, he took third in the 2017 Dave Schultz Memorial International tournament, and third in Cerro Pelado International tournament. Gadson was the 2016 UWW University National champion, and finished third at the 2016 U.S. Open.

== Personal ==
Gadson is the son of William (Willie) and Augusta Gadson. His father Willie, a former Iowa State Cyclone NCAA Division I collegiate wrestling All-American, coached Kyven in high school, but passed away while Kyven was in college. Gadson has earned a bachelor's degree in Child, Family and Adult Services and a master's degree in Higher Education, Leadership and Learning; both from Iowa State University.

== Mixed martial arts record ==
Professional record breakdown
3 matches	3 wins	0 losses
By knockout	1	0
By submission	2	0

Res.	Record	Opponent	Method	Event	Date	Round	Time	Location	Notes
Win	3–0	Adam Burdock-Poulin	Submission (kimura)	Caged Aggression 41: Night 1	March 27, 2026	3	2:05	Davenport, Iowa, United States	
Win	2–0	Victor Jones	TKO (punches)	Fury Fight Series 4	February 7, 2026	1	1:47	Waterloo, Iowa, United States	
Win	1–0	Jacob Eades	Submission (kimura)	Absolute Combat League 8	October 25, 2025	1	3:19	Ankeny, Iowa, United States	Heavyweight debut.
