= Thomas Gilman (wrestler) =

American freestyle wrestler (born 1994)

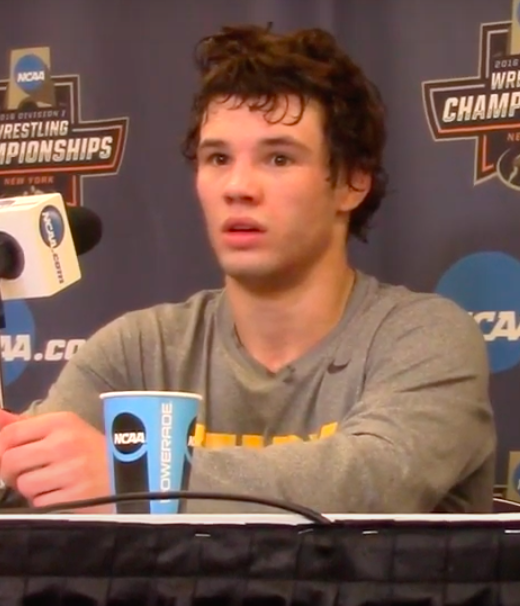
- Gilman at the 2016 NCAA's post-tournament press conference

Personal information
- Full name: Thomas Patrick Gilman
- Born: May 28, 1994 (age 32) Council Bluffs, Iowa, U.S.
- Height: 5 ft 6 in (168 cm)
- Weight: 57 kg (126 lb)

Sport
- Country: United States
- Sport: Wrestling
- Events: Freestyle and Folkstyle
- College team: Iowa
- Club: Pokes Wrestling; Hawkeye Wrestling Club
- Team: USA
- Coached by: Cael Sanderson; Tom Brands; Terry Brands
Medal record
Men's freestyle wrestling
Representing the United States
Olympic Games
Bronze medal – third place	2020 Tokyo	57 kg
World Championships
Gold medal – first place	2021 Oslo	57 kg
Silver medal – second place	2017 Paris	57 kg
Silver medal – second place	2022 Belgrade	57 kg
Pan American Championships
Gold medal – first place	2022 Acapulco	57 kg
Gold medal – first place	2023 Buenos Aires	57 kg
Bronze medal – third place	2018 Lima	57 kg
Ivan Yarygin Golden Grand Prix
Bronze medal – third place	2019 Krasnoyarsk	57 kg
Tunis Ranking Series
Gold medal – first place	2022 Tunisia	57 kg
US Open Championships
Silver medal – second place	2019 Las Vegas	57 kg
Junior World Championships
Bronze medal – third place	2014 Zagreb	55 kg
Men's collegiate wrestling
Representing the Iowa Hawkeyes
NCAA Division I Championships
Silver medal – second place	2016 New York	125 lb
Bronze medal – third place	2017 St. Louis	125 lb
Big Ten Championships
Gold medal – first place	2017 Bloomington	125 lb
Silver medal – second place	2015 Columbus	125 lb
Bronze medal – third place	2016 Iowa City	125 lb

Thomas Patrick Gilman (born May 28, 1994) is an American retired freestyle and folkstyle wrestler who competed at 57 kilograms. A Summer Olympic medalist and world champion in 2021, Gilman was most notably also a three-time World Championship medalist. Out of the University of Iowa, he was a three-time NCAA Division I All-American.

== Folkstyle career ==
=== Early life ===
Born and raised in Iowa to Patrick and Cheri Gilman, Thomas moved to Nebraska to attend Skutt Catholic High School in Omaha. As a high school wrestler, Gilman went on to become the 20th four-time Nebraska (NSAA) state champion in history and helped the team win three state titles. He also won the 2009 NHSCA National title at 103 pounds as a freshman.

As a senior ('11–'12), Gilman committed to Terry Brands and the Iowa Hawkeyes as the top recruit in Nebraska.

=== College ===
While redshirting ('12–'13), Gilman compiled 23 wins (14 of them with bonus points) and five losses, won two Open tournament titles, and ended on a seven-match win streak. As a freshman ('13–'14), he racked up a 16–3 mark, including seven victories and two losses in dual meets and a Midlands title, where he recorded wins over defending NCAA champion Jesse Delgado and three-time ACC champion Jarrod Garnett. However, he was not the starter at 125 pounds for the postseason tournaments (NCAAs and B1Gs) after being defeated by teammate Cory Clark in a wrestle-off for the spot.

As a sophomore ('14–'15), he compiled 31 wins and six losses, a 15–2 record in dual meets, a perfect 9–0 in Big Ten duals and Midlands runner-up honors. In the postseason, he claimed runner-up honors at the Big Ten Championships to Ohio State's Nathan Tomasello and became an All-American with a fourth-place finish at the NCAA's.

As a junior ('15–'16), Gilman improved with a 28–2 record, including a perfect 17–0 in dual meets. His first loss came at the Big Ten Championship semifinals by two-time NCAA runner-up Nico Megaludis, and he came back to claim third place at the tournament. At the NCAA championships, he dominantly reached the finale with two majors, one technical fall and a pin over the defending NCAA champion Nathan Tomasello, while also avenging his last season's loss. In the finals, Gilman was once again downed by Nico Megaludis from PSU, claiming runner-up honors.

In his final year ('16–'17), Gilman compiled 32 wins and just one loss, with a 15–0 mark at dual meets. He led the Hawkeyes on falls and technical falls, scored bonus points in 26 out of 32 wins and won the Midland Championships, being named the Outstanding Wrestler as well. After being the top–ranked 125-pounder in the country throughout the whole season, Gilman claimed his first Big Ten title by topping Timothy Lambert from Nebraska in the finals. As the top–seed at the NCAA's, Gilman was on a dominant with two majors and a fall over rival Nick Piccininni to make the semifinals, but was defeated by the eventual winner of the championship Darian Cruz, getting thrown to the consolation side of the bracket. He came back with a victory over second-seeded Joey Dance and once again downed Nick Piccininni, now 13–6 to claim third place. Gilman graduated with 107 wins and 12 losses.

== Freestyle career ==
=== Age-group level ===
Gilman was a three-time US World Team Member, once as a cadet and twice as a junior, and claimed a bronze medal from the Junior World Championships in 2014.

=== Senior level ===
==== 2013 ====
Gilman made his senior-level debut at the US University Nationals at age 18, where he placed third.

==== 2017 ====
After his folkstyle career ended, Gilman competed at the US Last Chance World Team Trials Qualifier in May, and placed first to earn a spot at the US World Team Trials. At the US World Team Trials Challenge Tournament of June, Gilman defeated 2017 NCAA champion Darian Cruz, reigning Pan American champion Tyler Graff, two-time US University national champion Nico Megaludis, and 2015 NCAA champion Nathan Tomasello, to make the best-of-three final. In the best–of–three, Gilman went on to defeat fellow graduated Hawkeye Tony Ramos twice in a row to become the biggest underdog to make the 2017 US World Team. Gilman then went on to claim the prestigious Grand Prix of Spain in July.

At the 2017 World Championships, Gilman opened up with big wins over 2016 European Continental runner–up and two–time Cadet World Champion from Ukraine Andriy Yatsenko and 2017 Asian Continental medalist from Iran Reza Atri, before defeating 2017 Dave Schultz Memorial runner–up Nodirjon Safarov and stunning 2014 Asian Games Gold medalist from North–Korea Jong Hak-jin to astonishingly making the finals of the tournament. In the finale, Gilman's 15 match win–streak was broken by 2017 Asian Continental champion from Japan Yuki Takahashi, claiming the 2017 World Championship Silver medal. To cap off the year, Gilman helped Titan Mercury Wrestling Club reach second–place at the Clubs World Championship.

==== 2018 ====
Gilman started off the year by helping Team USA reach the gold medal at the World Cup, going 2–2. He then claimed a bronze medal from the Pan American Championships, after falling to 2017 U23 World Champion from Cuba Reineri Andreu in the semifinals and bouncing back in the third–place match. In June, the defending US World Team Member was able to defeat Junior World Champion Daton Fix twice in a row at Final X Lincoln to make back–to–back teams. In July, he claimed the prestigious Yasar Dogu International title, defeating Süleyman Atlı in the process. At the 2018 World Championships, Gilman went on to defeat Italy's Givi Davidovi and Azerbaijan's three–time and reigning European Continental champion Giorgi Edisherashvili, before being defeated by 2018 Asian Continental champion (61kg) from Kazakhstan Nurislam Sanayev and Süleyman Atlı to place fifth.

==== 2019–2020 ====
Gilman started off the year competing overseas, claiming an Ivan Yarygin Golden Grand Prix bronze medal and placing 15th at the Dan Kolov – Nikola Petrov Memorial. After coming back to the United States, Gilman claimed runner–up honors from the US Open, losing to Daton Fix in the finals but not before beating Nathan Tomasello. In May, he claimed the US World Team Trials Challenge by defeating Darian Cruz twice, becoming the Final X challenger. At June's Final X, Gilman was defeated by Fix two to one, losing the chance of representing the United States at the World Championships. Gilman then travelled to Russia to train in Vladikavkaz, and was named the USA Wrestling Athlete of the Week after claiming the Yusup Abdusalamov Memorial. He also competed at the Intercontinental Cup and the Alans International, placing third at twelfth respectively before returning to the United States.

Gilman opened up 2020 with a prestigious Matteo Pellicone Ranking Series title, defeating Daton Fix in the semifinals and 2019 World Championship medalist (61 kg) Joe Colon in the semifinals and finals. Gilman then continued his streak two months later, and qualified the weight for the United States to compete at the 2020 Summer Olympics after winning the gold medal from the Pan American Olympic Qualification Tournament, notably defeating two–time U23 World Champion from Cuba Reineri Andreu in the semifinals. Gilman was then scheduled to compete at the 2020 US Olympic Team Trials in April, however, the event was postponed as well as the 2020 Summer Olympics due to the COVID-19 outbreak. In April 10, Gilman announced his move from his long–time club, the Hawkeye Wrestling Club, to the Nittany Lion Wrestling Club in State College, Pennsylvania.

After being unable to compete for months due to the pandemic, Gilman competed at his now local NLWC in their first event in September, where he tech'd NCAA champion Darian Cruz. In their third event, in November, Gilman pinned 2017 Ukrainian International Open runner–up Frank Perrelli, notably calling out Spencer Lee afterwards. In his last event of the year, Gilman was unable to keep his unbeaten streak and was defeated by 2019 Bill Farrell Memorial champion Seth Gross via criteria in December.

==== 2021 ====
To open up the year, Gilman competed at the Grand Prix de France Henri Deglane in January, where after downing three–time European Continental champion Giorgi Edisherashvili and 2020 US National champion Vito Arujau in his first two matches, he was controversially defeated by Islam Bazarganov on criteria, but was able to defeat Edisherashvili in the third–place match to claim bronze. In February, he competed at the fifth NLWC event, and was upset by Zach Sanders, before defeating Sean Russell. In April 2–3, Gilman, the top–seed, competed at the rescheduled 2020 US Olympic Team Trials in an attempt to represent the United States at the 2020 Summer Olympics. To make it to the best–of–three, he ran through two–time All–American Zane Richards and World Championship medalist Joe Colon, ending both via technical fall. Gilman then wrestled Vito Arujau (21–2 since the pandemic, took out Daton Fix in the semifinals), and went on to pin him in the first match and beat him via criteria in the second match. This result qualified Gilman to represent the United States at the 2020 Summer Olympics, and he is expected to do so in August 4–5. He was also expected to compete at the Pan American Continental Championships, but was forced out due to a foot injury and was replaced by Arujau.

On August 4, Gilman competed in the first date of the men's freestyle 57 kg of the 2020 Summer Olympics, where he went the distance in a razor-close loss to eventual winner of the Olympic Games and two-time and reigning World Champion Zaur Uguev from the Russian Olympic Committee. As the Russian kept advancing on the bracket, Gilman was pulled into repechage to compete on August 5, dominating Gulomjon Abdullaev from Uzbekistan and '19 Asian champion Reza Atri from Iran in order to capture the bronze medal for the United States.

As an Olympic medalist, Gilman earned the right to automatically represent the United States at the 2021 World Championships without having to compete domestically to make the US World Team, and did so from October 3 to 4. Gilman had a dominant run on the first date, bulldozing through '21 Russian National medalist Abubakar Mutaliev and European Continental medalists Vladimir Egorov and Horst Lehr to make his second World finale. Different from his 2017 finals, Gilman emerged victorious over '21 Asian Continental finalist Alireza Sarlak on October 4 in order to acclaim the World Championship, becoming the first 57 kilogram American competitor to do so.

==== 2022 ====
Back from becoming a World Champion, Gilman defeated familiar foe and NCAA champion Darian Cruz eleven points to zero on February 12, at Bout at the Ballpark. On May 8, he became the Pan American Continental champion, downing Cruz again for the title. Gilman claimed the spot to represent his country at the 2022 World Championships for the fourth time in his career, taking out Vito Arujau twice in a row at Final X Stillwater. In July 18, he claimed gold at the Tunis Ranking Series, despite losing to 2021 World medalist Horst Lehr.

After cruising to the finals with not much trouble, Gilman was downed by Zelimkhan Abakarov on September 17 at the 2022 World Championships, earning a silver medal in his third World finals match.

== Wrestling style ==
Gilman will usually try to be as physical as possible, controlling the center with his strength and walking down and pushing his opponent while overwhelming him with heavy hand fighting until a takedown opportunity opens up. Due to his aggressiveness, Gilman is considered to have the traditional Iowa style and is often described as "tough" and a "brawler".

== Freestyle record ==
Senior Freestyle Matches
Res.	Record	Opponent	Score	Date	Event	Location
Loss	96–27	(Cuba) Reineri Andreu	3–4	January 26, 2025	ISU vs. OSU dual	(United States) Ames, Iowa
2024 US Olympic Team Trials (silver) at 57 kg
Loss	96–26	(United States) Spencer Lee	Fall	April 20, 2024	2024 US Olympic Team Trials	(United States) State College, Pennsylvania
Loss	96–25	(United States) Spencer Lee	3–6	April 20, 2024	2024 US Olympic Team Trials	(United States) State College, Pennsylvania
Win	96–24	(United States) Daton Fix	6–0	April 19, 2024	2024 US Olympic Team Trials	(United States) State College, Pennsylvania
Win	95–24	(United States) Jax Forrest	5–4	April 19, 2024	2024 US Olympic Team Trials	(United States) State College, Pennsylvania
2023 US World Team Trials (silver) at 57 kg
Loss	94–24	(United States) Zane Richards	6–8	June 10, 2023	2023 Final X: Newark	(United States) Newark, New Jersey
Loss	94–23	(United States) Zane Richards	3–4	June 10, 2023	2023 Final X: Newark	(United States) Newark, New Jersey
2023 Pan American Championships (gold) at 57 kg
Win	94–22	(Puerto Rico) Darian Cruz	TF 10–0	May 6, 2022	2023 Pan American Continental Championships	Buenos Aires, Argentina
Win	93–22	(Cuba) Santiago Chaveco	TF 11–0	May 6, 2022	2023 Pan American Continental Championships	Buenos Aires, Argentina
Win	92–22	(Argentina) Hernan Almendra	TF 11–0	May 6, 2022	2023 Pan American Continental Championships	Buenos Aires, Argentina
2023 Dan Kolov & Nikola Petrov 8th at 61 kg
Loss	91–22	(Japan) Kaisei Tanabe	TF 1–11	March 2, 2023	2023 Dan Kolov & Nikola Petrov Tournament	Sofia, Bulgaria
2022 World Championships (silver) at 57 kg
Loss	91–21	(Albania) Zelimkhan Abakarov	2–7	September 17, 2022	2022 World Championships	Belgrade, Serbia
Win	91–20	(China) Zou Wanhao	8–2	September 16, 2022	2022 World Championships	Belgrade, Serbia
Win	90–20	(Mongolia) Zandanbudyn Zanabazar	5–1	September 16, 2022	2022 World Championships	Belgrade, Serbia
Win	89–20	(Australia) Georgii Okorokov	TF 11–0	September 16, 2022	2022 World Championships	Belgrade, Serbia
2022 Tunis Ranking Series (gold) at 57 kg
Win	88–20	(India) Udit Kumar	9–8	July 18, 2022	2022 Tunis Ranking Series	Tunis, Tunisia
Win	87–20	(Iran) Alireza Sarlak	11–7	July 18, 2022	2022 Tunis Ranking Series	Tunis, Tunisia
Win	86–20	(Uzbekistan) Nodirjon Safarov	TF 11–1	July 18, 2022	2022 Tunis Ranking Series	Tunis, Tunisia
Loss	85–20	(Germany) Horst Lehr	Fall	July 18, 2022	2022 Tunis Ranking Series	Tunis, Tunisia
2022 US World Team Trials (gold) at 57 kg
Win	85–19	(United States) Vito Arujau	TF 14–2	June 3, 2022	2022 Final X: Stillwater	(United States) Stillwater, Oklahoma
Win	84–19	(United States) Vito Arujau	TF 12–2	June 3, 2022	2022 Final X: Stillwater	(United States) Stillwater, Oklahoma
2022 Pan American Championships (gold) at 57 kg
Win	83–19	(Puerto Rico) Darian Cruz	TF 11–0	May 8, 2022	2022 Pan American Continental Championships	Acapulco, Mexico
Win	82–19	(Cuba) Alexei Alvarez Blanco	Fall	May 8, 2022	2022 Pan American Continental Championships	Acapulco, Mexico
Win	81–19	(Peru) Enrique Herrera	Fall	May 8, 2022	2022 Pan American Continental Championships	Acapulco, Mexico
Win	80–19	(Puerto Rico) Darian Cruz	TF 11–0	February 12, 2022	2022 Bout at the Ballpark	(United States) Arlington, Texas
2021 World Championships (gold) at 57 kg
Win	79–19	(Iran) Alireza Sarlak	5–3	October 4, 2021	2021 World Championships	Oslo, Norway
Win	78–19	(Germany) Horst Lehr	TF 15–5	October 3, 2021	2021 World Championships	Oslo, Norway
Win	77–19	(North Macedonia) Vladimir Egorov	TF 11–0	October 3, 2021	2021 World Championships	Oslo, Norway
Win	76–19	(Russia) Abubakar Mutaliev	Fall	October 3, 2021	2021 World Championships	Oslo, Norway
2020 Summer Olympics (bronze) at 57 kg
Win	75–19	(Iran) Reza Atri	9–1	August 4–5, 2021	2020 Summer Olympics	Tokyo, Japan
Win	74–19	(Uzbekistan) Gulomjon Abdullaev	TF 11–1	August 4–5, 2021	2020 Summer Olympics	Tokyo, Japan
Loss	73–19	(Russia) Zaur Uguev	4–5	August 4–5, 2021	2020 Summer Olympics	Tokyo, Japan
2020 US Olympic Team Trials (gold) at 57 kg
Win	73–18	(United States) Vito Arujau	2–2	April 2–3, 2021	2020 US Olympic Team Trials	(United States) Fort Worth, Texas
Win	72–18	(United States) Vito Arujau	Fall	April 2–3, 2021	2020 US Olympic Team Trials	(United States) Fort Worth, Texas
Win	71–18	(United States) Joe Colon	TF 10–0	April 2–3, 2021	2020 US Olympic Team Trials	(United States) Fort Worth, Texas
Win	70–18	(United States) Zane Richards	TF 11–0	April 2–3, 2021	2020 US Olympic Team Trials	(United States) Fort Worth, Texas
Win	69–18	(United States) Sean Russell	TF 11–0	February 23, 2021	NLWC V	(United States) State College, Pennsylvania
Loss	68–18	(United States) Zach Sanders	Fall	February 23, 2021	NLWC V	(United States) State College, Pennsylvania
2021 Henri Deglane Grand Prix (bronze) at 57 kg
Win	68–17	(Azerbaijan) Giorgi Edisherashvili	6–4	January 16, 2021	Grand Prix de France Henri Deglane 2021	Nice, France
Loss	67–17	(Azerbaijan) Islam Bazarganov	6–6	January 16, 2021	Grand Prix de France Henri Deglane 2021	Nice, France
Win	67–16	(United States) Vito Arujau	6–2	January 16, 2021	Grand Prix de France Henri Deglane 2021	Nice, France
Win	66–16	(Azerbaijan) Giorgi Edisherashvili	4–0	January 16, 2021	Grand Prix de France Henri Deglane 2021	Nice, France
Loss	65–16	(United States) Seth Gross	4–4	December 16, 2020	WRTC II	(United States) Wisconsin
Win	65–15	(United States) Frank Perrelli	Fall	November 24, 2020	NLWC III	(United States) State College, Pennsylvania
Win	64–15	(United States) Darian Cruz	TF 14–4	September 19, 2020	NLWC I	(United States) State College, Pennsylvania
2020 Pan American Olympic Qualification (gold) at 57 kg
Win	63–15	(Colombia) Óscar Tigreros	FF	March 13–15, 2020	2020 Pan American Olympic Qualification Tournament	Ottawa, Canada
Win	62–15	(Dominican Republic) Juan Rubelin Ramirez Beltre	TF 11–0	March 13–15, 2020	2020 Pan American Olympic Qualification Tournament	Ottawa, Canada
Win	61–15	(Cuba) Reineri Andreu	4–3	March 13–15, 2020	2020 Pan American Olympic Qualification Tournament	Ottawa, Canada
Win	60–15	(Canada) Ligrit Sadiku	TF 10–0	March 13–15, 2020	2020 Pan American Olympic Qualification Tournament	Ottawa, Canada
2020 Matteo Pellicone Ranking Series (gold) at 57 kg
Win	59–15	(United States) Joe Colon	4–3	January 15–18, 2020	Matteo Pellicone Ranking Series 2020	Rome, Italy
Win	58–15	(United States) Daton Fix	2–1	January 15–18, 2020	Matteo Pellicone Ranking Series 2020	Rome, Italy
Win	57–15	(China) Minghu Liu	12–4	January 15–18, 2020	Matteo Pellicone Ranking Series 2020	Rome, Italy
Win	56–15	(Kazakhstan) Gabit Tolepbay	TF 11–0	January 15–18, 2020	Matteo Pellicone Ranking Series 2020	Rome, Italy
2019 Alans International 12th at 57 kg
Loss	55–15	(Russia) Abubakar Mutaliev	1–2	December 7–8, 2019	2019 Alans International Tournament	(Russia) Vladikavkaz, North Ossetia–Alania
Win	55–14	(Russia) Shamil Suleymanov	TF 13–3	December 7–8, 2019	2019 Alans International Tournament	(Russia) Vladikavkaz, North Ossetia–Alania
2019 Continental Cup (bronze) at 57 kg
Win	54–14	(Russia) Salikh Muradov	6–0	October 19–14, 2019	2019 Intercontinental Cup	(Russia) Khasavyurt, Dagestan
Loss	53–14	(Russia) Abubakar Mutaliev	8–10	October 19–14, 2019	2019 Intercontinental Cup	(Russia) Khasavyurt, Dagestan
2019 Yusup Abdusalamov International (gold) at 57 kg
Win	53–13	(Russia) Salikh Muradov		October 5, 2019	2019 Yusup Abdusalamov International	(Russia) Botlikh, Dagestan
Win	52–13	(Russia)		October 5, 2019	2019 Yusup Abdusalamov International	(Russia) Botlikh, Dagestan
Win	51–13	(Russia)		October 5, 2019	2019 Yusup Abdusalamov International	(Russia) Botlikh, Dagestan
Win	50–13	(Russia)		October 5, 2019	2019 Yusup Abdusalamov International	(Russia) Botlikh, Dagestan
Win	49–13	(Russia)		October 5, 2019	2019 Yusup Abdusalamov International	(Russia) Botlikh, Dagestan
2019 Final X: Lincoln (silver) at 57 kg
Loss	48–13	(United States) Daton Fix	3–6	June 14–15, 2019	2019 US World Team Trials	(United States) Lincoln, Nebraska
Win	48–12	(United States) Daton Fix	3–2	June 14–15, 2019	2019 US World Team Trials	(United States) Lincoln, Nebraska
Loss	47–12	(United States) Daton Fix	1–9	June 14–15, 2019	2019 US World Team Trials	(United States) Lincoln, Nebraska
Win	47–11	(United States) Darian Cruz	5–2	May 17–19, 2019	2019 US World Team Trials Challenge	(United States) Raleigh, North Carolina
Win	46–11	(United States) Darian Cruz	4–0	May 17–19, 2019	2019 US World Team Trials Challenge	(United States) Raleigh, North Carolina
Win	45–11	(United States) Frank Perrelli	TF 10–0	May 17–19, 2019	2019 US World Team Trials Challenge	(United States) Raleigh, North Carolina
2019 US Open (silver) at 57 kg
Loss	44–11	(United States) Daton Fix	4–8	April 24–27, 2019	2019 US Open National Championships	(United States) Las Vegas, Nevada
Win	44–10	(United States) Nathan Tomasello	DQ (8–0)	April 24–27, 2019	2019 US Open National Championships	(United States) Las Vegas, Nevada
Win	43–10	(United States) Zane Richards	TF 12–2	April 24–27, 2019	2019 US Open National Championships	(United States) Las Vegas, Nevada
Win	42–10	(United States) Gunnar Woodburn	TF 11–0	April 24–27, 2019	2019 US Open National Championships	(United States) Las Vegas, Nevada
Win	41–10	(United States) Josh Portillo	TF 12–2	April 24–27, 2019	2019 US Open National Championships	(United States) Las Vegas, Nevada
2019 Dan Kolov - Nikola Petrov 15th at 57 kg
Loss	40–10	(Bulgaria) Georgi Vangelov	5–6	February 28 – March 3, 2019	2019 Dan Kolov - Nikola Petrov Memorial	Ruse, Bulgaria
2019 Ivan Yarygin Grand Prix (bronze) at 57 kg
Win	40–9	(Mongolia) Erdenebatyn Bekhbayar	14–8	January 24, 2019	Golden Grand Prix Ivan Yarygin 2019	Krasnoyarsk, Russia
Win	39–9	(Turkey) Ahmet Peker	9–0	January 24, 2019	Golden Grand Prix Ivan Yarygin 2019	Krasnoyarsk, Russia
Loss	38–9	(Russia) Abasgadzhi Magomedov	Fall	January 24, 2019	Golden Grand Prix Ivan Yarygin 2019	Krasnoyarsk, Russia
Win	38–8	(Cuba) Alexei Alvarez Blanco	TF 10–0	January 24, 2019	Golden Grand Prix Ivan Yarygin 2019	Krasnoyarsk, Russia
2018 World Championships 5th at 57 kg
Loss	37–8	(Turkey) Süleyman Atlı	4–5	October 21–22, 2018	2018 World Championships	Budapest, Hungary
Loss	37–7	(Kazakhstan) Nurislam Sanayev	TF 0–11	October 21–22, 2018	2018 World Championships	Budapest, Hungary
Win	37–6	(Azerbaijan) Giorgi Edisherashvili	4–0	October 21–22, 2018	2018 World Championships	Budapest, Hungary
Win	36–6	(Italy) Givi Davidovi	6–3	October 21–22, 2018	2018 World Championships	Budapest, Hungary
2018 Yaşar Doğu (gold) at 57 kg
Win	35–6	(Belarus) Dzmichyk Rynchynau	12–5	July 27–29, 2018	2018 Yaşar Doğu	Istanbul, Turkey
Win	34–6	(Ukraine) Taras Markovich	6–6	July 27–29, 2018	2018 Yaşar Doğu	Istanbul, Turkey
Win	33–6	(Turkey) Süleyman Atlı	7–5	July 27–29, 2018	2018 Yaşar Doğu	Istanbul, Turkey
Win	32–6	(Kazakhstan) Berdakh Primbayev	11–3	July 27–29, 2018	2018 Yaşar Doğu	Istanbul, Turkey
2018 Final X: Lincoln (gold) at 57 kg
Win	31–6	(United States) Daton Fix	2–1	June 8–9, 2018	2018 US World Team Trials	(United States) Lincoln, Nebraska
Win	30–6	(United States) Daton Fix	6–3	June 8–9, 2018	2018 US World Team Trials	(United States) Lincoln, Nebraska
2018 Pan American Championships (bronze) at 57 kg
Win	29–6	(Venezuela) Pedro Mejías	11–4	May 3–6, 2018	2018 Pan American Continental Championships	Lima, Peru
Loss	28–6	(Cuba) Reineri Andreu	4–7	May 3–6, 2018	2018 Pan American Continental Championships	Lima, Peru
Win	28–5	(Canada) Alex Moher	TF 10–0	May 3–6, 2018	2018 Pan American Continental Championships	Lima, Peru
Win	27–5	(Chile) Andre Quispé	TF 10–0	May 3–6, 2018	2018 Pan American Continental Championships	Lima, Peru
2018 World Cup (gold) as Team USA at 57 kg
Loss	26–5	(Azerbaijan) Giorgi Edisherashvili	7–8	April 7–8, 2018	2018 World Cup	(United States) Iowa City, Iowa
Win	26–4	(Georgia (country)) Teimuraz Vanishvili	6–4	April 7–8, 2018	2018 World Cup	(United States) Iowa City, Iowa
Loss	25–4	(Japan) Yuki Takahashi	1–4	April 7–8, 2018	2018 World Cup	(United States) Iowa City, Iowa
Win	25–3	(India) FF	FF	April 7–8, 2018	2018 World Cup	(United States) Iowa City, Iowa
2017 Clubs World Cup (silver) as TMWC
Loss	24–3	(Iran) Reza Atri	4–6	December 7–8, 2017	2017 World Clubs Cup	Tehran, Iran
Win	24–2	(Mongolia) Tseveensürengiin Tsogbadrakh	5–2	December 7–8, 2017	2017 World Clubs Cup	Tehran, Iran
Win	23–2	(Bulgaria) FF	FF	December 7–8, 2017	2017 World Clubs Cup	Tehran, Iran
Win	22–2	(India) Amit Kumar Dahiya	6–3	December 7–8, 2017	2017 World Clubs Cup	Tehran, Iran
Win	21–2	(Canada) Steven Takahashi	13–6	December 7–8, 2017	2017 World Clubs Cup	Tehran, Iran
2017 World Championships (silver) at 57 kg
Loss	20–2	(Japan) Yuki Takahashi	0–6	August 25, 2017	2017 World Championships	Paris, France
Win	20–1	(North Korea) Jong Hak-jin	5–4	August 25, 2017	2017 World Championships	Paris, France
Win	19–1	(Uzbekistan) Nodirjon Safarov	TF 12–1	August 25, 2017	2017 World Championships	Paris, France
Win	18–1	(Iran) Reza Atri	3–0	August 25, 2017	2017 World Championships	Paris, France
Win	17–1	(Ukraine) Andriy Yatsenko	5–2	August 25, 2017	2017 World Championships	Paris, France
2017 Spain Grand Prix (gold) at 57 kg
Win	16–1	(France) Zoheir El Ouarraqe	10–2	July 15–16, 2017	2017 Grand Prix of Spain	Madrid, Spain
Win	15–1	(Spain) Levan Metreveli	TF 15–2	July 15–16, 2017	2017 Grand Prix of Spain	Madrid, Spain
Win	14–1	(Canada) Steven Takahashi	10–5	July 15–16, 2017	2017 Grand Prix of Spain	Madrid, Spain
2017 US World Team Trials (gold) at 57 kg
Win	13–1	(United States) Tony Ramos	7–2	June 9–10, 2017	2017 US World Team Trials	(United States) Lincoln, Nebraska
Win	12–1	(United States) Tony Ramos	4–3	June 9–10, 2017	2017 US World Team Trials	(United States) Lincoln, Nebraska
Win	11–1	(United States) Nathan Tomasello	6–2	June 9–10, 2017	2017 US World Team Trials Challenge	(United States) Lincoln, Nebraska
Win	10–1	(United States) Nico Megaludis	TF 10–0	June 9–10, 2017	2017 US World Team Trials Challenge	(United States) Lincoln, Nebraska
Win	9–1	(United States) Tyler Graff	1–1	June 9–10, 2017	2017 US World Team Trials Challenge	(United States) Lincoln, Nebraska
Win	8–1	(United States) Darian Cruz	9–0	June 9–10, 2017	2017 US World Team Trials Challenge	(United States) Lincoln, Nebraska
2017 US Last Chance Qualifier WTT (gold) at 57 kg
Win	7–1	(United States) Daniel Deshazer	7–6	May 19–22, 2017	2017 US Last Chance World Team Trials Qualifier	(United States) Rochester, Minnesota
Win	6–1	(United States) David Terao	9–4	May 19–22, 2017	2017 US Last Chance World Team Trials Qualifier	(United States) Rochester, Minnesota
2013 US University Nationals (bronze) at 55 kg
Win	5–1	(United States) Evan Silver	4–2	May 24–26, 2013	2013 US University National Championships	(United States) Akron, Ohio
Win	4–1	(United States) Dominique Price	TF 10–0	May 24–26, 2013	2013 US University National Championships	(United States) Akron, Ohio
Loss	3–1	(United States) Nico Megaludis	0–3	May 24–26, 2013	2013 US University National Championships	(United States) Akron, Ohio
Win	3–0	(United States) Dylan Peters	8–4	May 24–26, 2013	2013 US University National Championships	(United States) Akron, Ohio
Win	2–0	(United States) Max Soria	Fall	May 24–26, 2013	2013 US University National Championships	(United States) Akron, Ohio
Win	1–0	(United States) Drake Swarm	TF 10–0	May 24–26, 2013	2013 US University National Championships	(United States) Akron, Ohio
