= 2026 World Wrestling Championships – Men's freestyle 61 kg =

Men's freestyle 61 kg at the 2026 World Championships
- Venue: Barys Arena
- Dates: 30–31 October 2026
- Competitors: 27 from 27 nations

Medalists
| gold medal | Ahmad Javan | Iran |
| silver medal | Zaur Uguev | Russia |
| bronze medal | Kim Kwang-myong | North Korea |
| bronze medal | Marcus Blaze | United States |

The men's freestyle 61 kilograms is a competition featured at the 2026 World Wrestling Championships, and was held in Astana, Kazakhstan on 30 and 31 October 2026.

This freestyle wrestling competition consists of a single-elimination tournament, with a repechage used to determine the winner of two bronze medals. The two finalists face off for gold and silver medals. Each wrestler who loses to one of the two finalists moves into the repechage, culminating in a pair of bronze medal matches, featuring the semifinal losers each facing the remaining repechage opponent from their half of the bracket.

== Results ==
Legend

- F — Won by fall

=== Final ===
| Final |
| Zaur Uguev (RUS) | 2 |
| Ahmad Javan (IRI) | 9 |

=== Top half ===
Round of 32
Zou Wanhao (CHN) | 3
Kim Kwang-myong (PRK) | 6
Gulomjon Abdullaev (UZB) | 6
Kim Chang-su (KOR) | 0
Caleb Smith (PUR) | 12
Georgii Okorokov (AUS) | 2
Toshihiro Hasegawa (JPN) | 8
Gankhülegiin Batnasan (MGL) | 4
Derek Guanajuato (MEX) | 0
Arsen Harutyunyan (ARM) | 10

Round of 16
Zaur Uguev (RUS) | 10
Kim Kwang-myong (PRK) | 0
Gulomjon Abdullaev (UZB) | 6
Caleb Smith (PUR) | 2
Kamil Kerymov (UKR) | 5
Toshihiro Hasegawa (JPN) | 10
Arsen Harutyunyan (ARM) | 4
Zelimkhan Abakarov (ALB) | 14

Quarterfinals
Zaur Uguev (RUS) | 3
Gulomjon Abdullaev (UZB) | 2
Toshihiro Hasegawa (JPN) | 1
Zelimkhan Abakarov (ALB) | 8

Semifinals
Zaur Uguev (RUS) | 3
Zelimkhan Abakarov (ALB) | 0

=== Bottom half ===
Round of 32
Omurbek Asan Uulu (KGZ) | 0
Assyl Aitakyn (KAZ) | 4
Roger Ramalhete (BRA) | 0
Giorgi Goniashvili (GEO) | 10
Horst Lehr (GER) | 7
Dzmitry Shamela (BLR) | 7
Leonid Colesnic (MDA) | 10
Besir Alili (MKD) | 0
Marcus Blaze (USA) | 7^{F}
Emrah Ormanoğlu (TUR) | 2
Mikyay Naim (BUL) | 2
Nikhil (IND) | 12

Round of 16
Nuraddin Novruzov (AZE) | 4
Assyl Aitakyn (KAZ) | 5
Giorgi Goniashvili (GEO) | 5
Horst Lehr (GER) | 8^{F}
Leonid Colesnic (MDA) | 0
Marcus Blaze (USA) | 10
Nikhil (IND) | 9
Ahmad Javan (IRI) | 10

Quarterfinals
Assyl Aitakyn (KAZ) | 8
Horst Lehr (GER) | 1
Marcus Blaze (USA) | 2
Ahmad Javan (IRI) | 3

Semifinals
Assyl Aitakyn (KAZ) | 1
Ahmad Javan (IRI) | 3

=== Repechage ===
Repechage round 2
Kim Kwang-myong (PRK) | 4^{F}
Gulomjon Abdullaev (UZB) | 6
Nikhil (IND) | 1
Marcus Blaze (USA) | 9

Bronze medals
Kim Kwang-myong (PRK) | 3
Zelimkhan Abakarov (ALB) | 3
Marcus Blaze (USA) | 4
Assyl Aitakyn (KAZ) | 2

== Final standing ==
| Rank | Athlete |
|---|---|
| 1st place, gold medalist(s) | Ahmad Javan (IRI) |
| 2nd place, silver medalist(s) | Zaur Uguev (RUS) |
| 3rd place, bronze medalist(s) | Kim Kwang-myong (PRK) |
| 3rd place, bronze medalist(s) | Marcus Blaze (USA) |
| 5 | Zelimkhan Abakarov (ALB) |
| 5 | Assyl Aitakyn (KAZ) |
| 7 | Horst Lehr (GER) |
| 8 | Gulomjon Abdullaev (UZB) |
| 9 | Toshihiro Hasegawa (JPN) |
| 10 | Nikhil (IND) |
| 11 | Caleb Smith (PUR) |
| 12 | Arsen Harutyunyan (ARM) |
| 13 | Giorgi Goniashvili (GEO) |
| 14 | Leonid Colesnic (MDA) |
| 15 | Dzmitry Shamela (BLR) |
| 16 | Kamil Kerymov (UKR) |
| 17 | Nuraddin Novruzov (AZE) |
| 18 | Gankhülegiin Batnasan (MGL) |
| 19 | Zou Wanhao (CHN) |
| 20 | Georgii Okorokov (AUS) |
| 21 | Mikyay Naim (BUL) |
| 22 | Emrah Ormanoğlu (TUR) |
| 23 | Omurbek Asan Uulu (KGZ) |
| 24 | Kim Chang-su (KOR) |
| 25 | Derek Guanajuato (MEX) |
| 26 | Roger Ramalhete (BRA) |
| 27 | Besir Alili (MKD) |
