= 2024 World Wrestling Championships – Men's freestyle 61 kg =

Wrestling competitions

Men's freestyle 61 kg at the 2024 World Championships
- Venue: Tirana Olympic Park
- Dates: 30–31 October 2024
- Competitors: 27 from 25 nations

Medalists
gold medal	Masanosuke Ono	Japan
silver medal	Ahmet Duman	Turkey
bronze medal	Tseveensürengiin Tsogbadrakh	Mongolia
bronze medal	Vito Arujau	United States

The men's freestyle 61 kilograms is a competition featured at the 2024 World Wrestling Championships, and was held in Tirana, Albania on 30 and 31 October.

This freestyle wrestling competition consists of a single-elimination tournament, with a repechage used to determine the winner of two bronze medals. The two finalists face off for gold and silver medals. Each wrestler who loses to one of the two finalists moves into the repechage, culminating in a pair of bronze medal matches, featuring the semifinal losers each facing the remaining repechage opponent from their half of the bracket.

Each bout consists of a single round within a six-minute limit, including two halves of three minutes. The wrestler who scores more points is the winner.

Masanosuke Ono of Japan dominated the competition and won the gold medal.

== Results ==
Legend

- F — Won by fall

=== Final ===
Final
Ahmet Duman (TUR)	0
Masanosuke Ono (JPN)	10

=== Top half ===
Round of 32
Aryan Tsiutryn (AIN)	1
Tseveensürengiin Tsogbadrakh (MGL)	2
Reza Momeni (IRI)	10
Besir Alili (MKD)	0
Endrio Avdyli (ALB)	2
Nino Leutert (SUI)	3
Josh Kramer (ECU)	10
Giorgi Goniashvili (GEO)	13
Peter Hammer (CRC)	0
Ahmet Duman (TUR)	10

Round of 16
Taiyrbek Zhumashbek Uulu (KGZ)	0
Tseveensürengiin Tsogbadrakh (MGL)	3
Reza Momeni (IRI)	10
Nino Leutert (SUI)	0
Joey Silva (PUR)	12
Giorgi Goniashvili (GEO)	2
Ahmet Duman (TUR)	14
Nuraddin Novruzov (AZE)	4

Quarterfinals
Tseveensürengiin Tsogbadrakh (MGL)	3
Reza Momeni (IRI)	1
Joey Silva (PUR)	2
Ahmet Duman (TUR)	5

Semifinals
Tseveensürengiin Tsogbadrakh (MGL)	1
Ahmet Duman (TUR)	3

=== Bottom half ===
Round of 32
Zaur Uguev (AIN)	2
Masanosuke Ono (JPN)	10
Arman Eloyan (FRA)	7
Gamzatgadzsi Halidov (HUN)	5
Andrii Dzhelep (UKR)	0
Mezhlum Mezhlumyan (ARM)	6
Assyl Aitakyn (KAZ)	5
Leonid Colesnic (MDA)	6
Răzvan Kovacs (ROU)	0
Azamat Tuskaev (SRB)	11
Udit Kumar (IND)	10
Christopher Merlo (CAN)	0

Round of 16
Li Weiyu (CHN)	0
Masanosuke Ono (JPN)	12
Arman Eloyan (FRA)	5
Mezhlum Mezhlumyan (ARM)	4
Leonid Colesnic (MDA)	0
Azamat Tuskaev (SRB)	4
Udit Kumar (IND)	2
Vito Arujau (USA)	4

Quarterfinals
Masanosuke Ono (JPN)	11
Arman Eloyan (FRA)	0
Azamat Tuskaev (SRB)	3
Vito Arujau (USA)	6

Semifinals
Masanosuke Ono (JPN)	12
Vito Arujau (USA)	0

=== Repechage ===
Repechage round 1
Peter Hammer (CRC)	4
Nuraddin Novruzov (AZE)	14
Zaur Uguev (AIN)	12
Li Weiyu (CHN)	0

Repechage round 2
Nuraddin Novruzov (AZE)	17
Joey Silva (PUR)	6
Zaur Uguev (AIN)	10
Arman Eloyan (FRA)	0

Bronze medals
Nuraddin Novruzov (AZE)	2
Tseveensürengiin Tsogbadrakh (MGL)	8^{F}
Zaur Uguev (AIN)	3
Vito Arujau (USA)	8

== Final standing ==
Rank	Athlete
1st place, gold medalist(s)	Masanosuke Ono (JPN)
2nd place, silver medalist(s)	Ahmet Duman (TUR)
3rd place, bronze medalist(s)	Tseveensürengiin Tsogbadrakh (MGL)
3rd place, bronze medalist(s)	Vito Arujau (USA)
5	Nuraddin Novruzov (AZE)
5	Zaur Uguev (AIN)
7	Reza Momeni (IRI)
8	Azamat Tuskaev (SRB)
9	Joey Silva (PUR)
10	Arman Eloyan (FRA)
11	Udit Kumar (IND)
12	Giorgi Goniashvili (GEO)
13	Mezhlum Mezhlumyan (ARM)
14	Leonid Colesnic (MDA)
15	Nino Leutert (SUI)
16	Josh Kramer (ECU)
17	Assyl Aitakyn (KAZ)
18	Gamzatgadzsi Halidov (HUN)
19	Peter Hammer (CRC)
20	Endrio Avdyli (ALB)
21	Aryan Tsiutryn (AIN)
22	Taiyrbek Zhumashbek Uulu (KGZ)
23	Andrii Dzhelep (UKR)
24	Besir Alili (MKD)
25	Christopher Merlo (CAN)
26	Răzvan Kovacs (ROU)
27	Li Weiyu (CHN)
