= 2025 World Wrestling Championships – Men's freestyle 61 kg =

Wrestling competitions

Men's freestyle 61 kg at the 2025 World Championships
- Venue: Arena Zagreb
- Dates: 13–14 September 2025
- Competitors: 26 from 24 nations

Medalists
gold medal	Zaur Uguev
silver medal	Ahmad Javan	Iran
bronze medal	Assylzhan Yessengeldi	Kazakhstan
bronze medal	Nuraddin Novruzov	Azerbaijan

The men's freestyle 61 kilograms is a competition featured at the 2025 World Wrestling Championships, and was held in Zagreb, Croatia on 13 and 14 September 2025.

This freestyle wrestling competition consists of a single-elimination tournament, with a repechage used to determine the winner of two bronze medals. The two finalists face off for gold and silver medals. Each wrestler who loses to one of the two finalists moves into the repechage, culminating in a pair of bronze medal matches, featuring the semifinal losers each facing the remaining repechage opponent from their half of the bracket.

== Results ==
Legend

- F — Won by fall

=== Final ===
Final
Zaur Uguev (UWW)	11
Ahmad Javan (IRI)	2

=== Top half ===
Round of 32
Manvel Khndzrtsyan (ARM)	6
Simone Piroddu (ITA)	1
Besir Alili (MKD)	1
Georgii Okorokov (AUS)	7
Assylzhan Yessengeldi (KAZ)	10
Nino Leutert (SUI)	0
Ibrahim Guzan (YEM)	0
Taiyrbek Zhumashbek Uulu (KGZ)	10^{F}
Han Sang-boum (KOR)	0
Jax Forrest (USA)	10

Round of 16
Zaur Uguev (UWW)	11
Manvel Khndzrtsyan (ARM)	0
Georgii Okorokov (AUS)	0
Assylzhan Yessengeldi (KAZ)	11
Udit Kumar (IND)	0
Taiyrbek Zhumashbek Uulu (KGZ)	2
Jax Forrest (USA)	7
Takara Suda (JPN)	2

Quarterfinals
Zaur Uguev (UWW)	13
Assylzhan Yessengeldi (KAZ)	2
Taiyrbek Zhumashbek Uulu (KGZ)	8
Jax Forrest (USA)	13

Semifinals
Zaur Uguev (UWW)	10
Jax Forrest (USA)	3

=== Bottom half ===
Round of 32
Kim Kum-hyok (PRK)	5
Dylan Shawver (PUR)	4
Zelimkhan Abakarov (ALB)	3
Emrah Ormanoğlu (TUR)	0
Dzmitry Shamela (UWW)	9
Tümenbilegiin Tüvshintulga (MGL)	7
Kamil Kerymov (UKR)	12
Sun Zezhong (CHN)	2
Josh Kramer (ECU)	2
Ahmad Javan (IRI)	13

Round of 16
Giorgi Goniashvili (GEO)	4
Kim Kum-hyok (PRK)	15
Zelimkhan Abakarov (ALB)	4
Leonid Colesnic (MDA)	7
Dzmitry Shamela (UWW)	4
Kamil Kerymov (UKR)	15
Ahmad Javan (IRI)	5
Nuraddin Novruzov (AZE)	2

Quarterfinals
Kim Kum-hyok (PRK)	10
Leonid Colesnic (MDA)	0
Kamil Kerymov (UKR)	4
Ahmad Javan (IRI)	8

Semifinals
Kim Kum-hyok (PRK)	2
Ahmad Javan (IRI)	3

=== Repechage ===
Repechage round 1
Josh Kramer (ECU)	0
Nuraddin Novruzov (AZE)	10

Repechage round 2
Manvel Khndzrtsyan (ARM)	4
Assylzhan Yessengeldi (KAZ)	11^{F}
Nuraddin Novruzov (AZE)	12
Kamil Kerymov (UKR)	2

Bronze medals
Assylzhan Yessengeldi (KAZ)	10
Jax Forrest (USA)	8
Nuraddin Novruzov (AZE)	6^{F}
Kim Kum-hyok (PRK)	0

== Final standing ==
Rank	Athlete
1st place, gold medalist(s)	Zaur Uguev (UWW)
2nd place, silver medalist(s)	Ahmad Javan (IRI)
3rd place, bronze medalist(s)	Assylzhan Yessengeldi (KAZ)
3rd place, bronze medalist(s)	Nuraddin Novruzov (AZE)
5	Jax Forrest (USA)
5	Kim Kum-hyok (PRK)
7	Kamil Kerymov (UKR)
8	Taiyrbek Zhumashbek Uulu (KGZ)
9	Dzmitry Shamela (UWW)
10	Zelimkhan Abakarov (ALB)
11	Manvel Khndzrtsyan (ARM)
12	Georgii Okorokov (AUS)
13	Leonid Colesnic (MDA)
14	Tümenbilegiin Tüvshintulga (MGL)
15	Dylan Shawver (PUR)
16	Giorgi Goniashvili (GEO)
17	Takara Suda (JPN)
18	Sun Zezhong (CHN)
19	Josh Kramer (ECU)
20	Simone Piroddu (ITA)
21	Besir Alili (MKD)
22	Udit Kumar (IND)
23	Emrah Ormanoğlu (TUR)
24	Nino Leutert (SUI)
25	Ibrahim Guzan (YEM)
26	Han Sang-boum (KOR)
