= 2023 European Wrestling Championships – Men's freestyle 57 kg =

Wrestling competition

Men's freestyle 57 kg at the 2023 European Wrestling Championships
- Venue: Arena Zagreb
- Location: Zagreb, Croatia
- Dates: 17-18 April
- Competitors: 12

Medalists
gold medal	Aliabbas Rzazade	Azerbaijan
silver medal	Süleyman Atlı	Turkey
bronze medal	Horst Lehr	Germany
bronze medal	Georgi Vangelov	Bulgaria

The Men's Freestyle 57 kg is a competition featured at the 2023 European Wrestling Championships, and was held in Zagreb, Croatia on April 17 and 18.

== Results ==
Legend

- F — Won by fall

Round of 16
Anatolii Buruian (MDA)	1
Horst Lehr (GER)	2
Levan Metreveli (ESP)	2
Simone Piroddu (ITA)	3
Manvel Khndzrtsyan (ARM)	5
Georgi Vangelov (BUL)	8
Thomas Epp (SUI)	1
Răzvan Kovacs (ROU)	4

Quarterfinals
Aliabbas Rzazade (AZE)	10^{F}
Horst Lehr (GER)	5
Simone Piroddu (ITA)	19
Andriy Yatsenko (UKR)	8
Süleyman Atlı (TUR)	5
Georgi Vangelov (BUL)	4
Răzvan Kovacs (ROU)	3
Roberti Dingashvili (GEO)	13

Semifinals
Aliabbas Rzazade (AZE)	12
Simone Piroddu (ITA)	8
Süleyman Atlı (TUR)	13
Roberti Dingashvili (GEO)	1

Final
Aliabbas Rzazade (AZE)	12
Süleyman Atlı (TUR)	2

Bronze medal match
Horst Lehr (GER)	2
Simone Piroddu (ITA)	2
Georgi Vangelov (BUL)	10
Roberti Dingashvili (GEO)	0

== Final standing ==
Rank	Athlete
1st place, gold medalist(s)	Aliabbas Rzazade (AZE)
2nd place, silver medalist(s)	Süleyman Atlı (TUR)
3rd place, bronze medalist(s)	Horst Lehr (GER)
3rd place, bronze medalist(s)	Georgi Vangelov (BUL)
5	Roberti Dingashvili (GEO)
5	Simone Piroddu (ITA)
7	Răzvan Kovacs (ROU)
8	Andriy Yatsenko (UKR)
9	Manvel Khndzrtsyan (ARM)
10	Levan Metreveli (ESP)
11	Anatolii Buruian (MDA)
12	Thomas Epp (SUI)
