= 2021 U23 World Wrestling Championships – Men's freestyle 61 kg =

Wrestling Championship

The men's freestyle 61 kilograms is a competition featured at the 2021 U23 World Wrestling Championships, and was held in Belgrade, Serbia on 6 and 7 November.

== Medalists ==
Gold	Arsen Harutyunyan (ARM)
Silver	Artur Chebodaev (RUS)
Bronze	Assyl Aitakyn (KAZ)
Bronze	Narmandakhyn Narankhüü (MGL)

== Results ==
Legend

- F — Won by fall

=== Final ===
Final
Arsen Harutyunyan (ARM)	11
Artur Chebodaev (RUS)	7

=== Top half ===
Round of 32
Gamzatgadzsi Halidov (HUN)	1
Arsen Harutyunyan (ARM)	11

Round of 16
Jason-Guy Luneau (CAN)	0
Kamil Kerimov (UKR)	10
Vadim Beregoi (MDA)	0
Assyl Aitakyn (KAZ)	2
~~Mohamed Gibbateh (SLE)~~
Muhammad Mokaev (GBR)	WO
Nico Megerle (GER)	0
Arsen Harutyunyan (ARM)	6

Quarterfinals
Kamil Kerimov (UKR)	3
Assyl Aitakyn (KAZ)	6
Muhammad Mokaev (GBR)	0
Arsen Harutyunyan (ARM)	10

Semifinals
Assyl Aitakyn (KAZ)	0
Arsen Harutyunyan (ARM)	5

=== Bottom half ===
Round of 32
Sardor Ruzimov (UZB)	3
Teimuraz Vanishvili (GEO)	3
Intigam Valizada (AZE)	2
Arman Eloyan (FRA)	3
Daniel Pucino (ITA)	2
Majid Dastan (IRI)	4
Islam Guseinov (BLR)	2
Narmandakhyn Narankhüü (MGL)	8
Endrio Avdyli (ALB)	0
Artur Chebodaev (RUS)	10
~~Soufiane Kabil (MAR)~~
Nino Leutert (SUI)	WO
Ahmet Duman (TUR)	6
Taiyrbek Zhumashbek Uulu (KGZ)	8
Suraj Kokate (IND)	0
Chris Cannon (USA)	10

Round of 16
Teimuraz Vanishvili (GEO)	3
Arman Eloyan (FRA)	4
Majid Dastan (IRI)	6
Narmandakhyn Narankhüü (MGL)	7
Artur Chebodaev (RUS)	10
Nino Leutert (SUI)	6
Taiyrbek Zhumashbek Uulu (KGZ)	5
Chris Cannon (USA)	9

Quarterfinals
Arman Eloyan (FRA)	4
Narmandakhyn Narankhüü (MGL)	11
Artur Chebodaev (RUS)	7
Chris Cannon (USA)	0

Semifinals
Narmandakhyn Narankhüü (MGL)	3
Artur Chebodaev (RUS)	5

=== Repechage ===
Repechage round 1
Gamzatgadzsi Halidov (HUN)	4
Nico Megerle (GER)	3
Endrio Avdyli (ALB)	0
Nino Leutert (SUI)	10

Repechage round 2
Gamzatgadzsi Halidov (HUN)	10
Muhammad Mokaev (GBR)	6
Nino Leutert (SUI)	8
Chris Cannon (USA)	11

Bronze medals
Gamzatgadzsi Halidov (HUN)	3
Assyl Aitakyn (KAZ)	3
Chris Cannon (USA)	0
Narmandakhyn Narankhüü (MGL)	10
