= Masanosuke Ono =

Japanese freestyle wrestler

Personal information
- Native name: 小野正之助
- Born: 10 February 2004 (age 22) Matsue City, Shimane Prefecture, Japan
- Height: 160 cm (5 ft 3 in)

Sport
- Country: Japan
- Sport: Wrestling
- Weight class: 61 kg
- Event: Freestyle
- Club: Nittany Lion Wrestling Club
- Coached by: Cael Sanderson; Yuka Takahashi (formerly)
Medal record
Men's freestyle wrestling
Representing Japan
World Championships
Gold medal – first place	2024 Tirana	61 kg
Asian Championships
Bronze medal – third place	2024 Bishkek	65 kg
Grand Prix
Gold medal – first place	2024 Antalya	61 kg
Japan National Championships
Gold medal – first place	2024 Tokyo	61 kg
Silver medal – second place	2023 Tokyo	65 kg
U20 World Championships
Gold medal – first place	2024 Pontevedra	61 kg

Masanosuke Ono (小野正之助, Masanosuke Ono; born 10 February 2004) is a Japanese freestyle wrestler who competes in the 61 kilogram class. In 2024, Ono became the World Champion, the Japan National champion and the U20 World champion.

== Early life ==
Ono was born in Shimano Prefecture, where he started wrestling at three years old. He attended Tosu Technical High School. During his teenage years, he won the Japan National tournament in different age-groups multiple times.

== Career ==
=== 2022–2023 ===
In June 2022, Ono placed eleventh at the Japan National Championships, making his senior level debut. In December 2023, he went up to 65 kilograms and earned a silver medal at the tournament, only losing in the finals to eventual Olympic champion Kotaro Kiyooka.

=== 2024 ===
In March, Ono made his international debut at the Yasar Dogu International, earning the championship at 61 kilograms. In April, he earned a bronze medal at the Asian Championships, up at 65 kilograms. In May, Ono became the Japanese National champion at 61 kilograms, earning the right to compete at the World Championships in October.

After making the U20 team earlier in the year, Ono became the U20 World champion at 61 kilograms in September, notably defeating Marcus Blaze in the semifinals.

In October, Ono competed at the World Championships in Albania, becoming the gold medalist at 20 years old. Outscoring his opposition 55–2, he notably defeated Olympic and multiple World champion Zaur Uguev from Russia (10-2), reigning World champion Vito Arujau from the United States (technical fall), and U23 World finalist Ahmet Duman from Turkey (technical fall) on his way to first World title.

=== 2025 ===
On February 26, Ono dropped down to 59.5 kilograms and defeated current Olympic silver medalist and World champion Spencer Lee from the United States with a score of 3-2, in the main event of FloWrestling: Night in America.

=== Pennsylvania State University ===
==== 2025–2026 ====
After months of training in the United States with the Pennsylvania State wrestling team, it was announced on March 24 that Ono had committed to the Nittany Lions and would look to debut in folkstyle. As he had transferred from Yamanashi Gakuin University in Japan, he was granted two years of NCAA eligibility, though would go on to redshirt during the 2025–2026 season.

Ono had registered to compete at 57 kilograms for November's Bill Farrell Memorial International in the United States, though would later withdraw a few days before the event. Then, he registered at the same weight class for the Emperor's Cup in Japan, set to take place in December, though would later withdraw once again, now due to kidney issues.

==== 2026–2027 ====
In July 2026, Ono returned to freestyle action at the Corporate All-Japan Championships, which took place in Nagoya, Japan. He racked up four technical falls to claim the gold medal without surrendering a point. He then competed at RAF 12 in August, blanking US Open and NCAA finalist Ben Davino by a score of 4 points to none.

== Freestyle record ==
Senior Freestyle Matches
Res.	Record	Opponent	Score	Date	Event	Location
Win	30–3	(United States) Ben Davino	4–0	August 22, 2026	RAF 12	(United States) Cleveland, Ohio
2026 Japan Corporate Nationals (gold) at 61 kg
Win	29–3	(Japan) Kento Yumiya	TF 10–0	July 11, 2026	2026 Corporate All-Japan Championships	Nagoya, Japan
Win	28–3	(Japan) Tokita Shota	TF 11–0	July 11, 2026	2026 Corporate All-Japan Championships	Nagoya, Japan
Win	27–3	(Mongolia) Enkhkhuslen Tushigbayar	TF 10–0	July 11, 2026	2026 Corporate All-Japan Championships	Nagoya, Japan
Win	26–3	(Japan) Takeru Ando	TF 12–0	July 11, 2026	2026 Corporate All-Japan Championships	Nagoya, Japan
Win	25–3	(United States) Spencer Lee	3–2	February 26, 2025	FloWrestling: Night in America – 59.5 kg	(United States) Coralville, Iowa
2024 World Championships (gold) at 61 kg
Win	24–3	(Turkey) Ahmet Duman	TF 10–0	October 30–31, 2024	2024 World Championships	Tirana, Albania
Win	23–3	(United States) Vito Arujau	TF 12–0	October 30–31, 2024	2024 World Championships	Tirana, Albania
Win	22–3	(France) Arman Eloyan	TF 11–0	October 30–31, 2024	2024 World Championships	Tirana, Albania
Win	21–3	(China) Li Weiyu	TF 12–0	October 30–31, 2024	2024 World Championships	Tirana, Albania
Win	20–3	(Russia) Zaur Uguev	10–2	October 30–31, 2024	2024 World Championships	Tirana, Albania
2024 Japan Nationals (gold) at 61 kg
Win	19–3	(Japan) Taichi Yamaguchi	TF 10–0	May 23–26, 2024	2024 Japan National Championships – Meiji Cup	Tokyo, Japan
Win	18–3	(Japan) Yuto Nishiuchi	3–2	May 23–26, 2024	2024 Japan National Championships – Meiji Cup	Tokyo, Japan
Win	17–3	(Japan) Rin Sakamoto	TF 10–0	May 23–26, 2024	2024 Japan National Championships – Meiji Cup	Tokyo, Japan
2024 Asian Championships (bronze) at 65 kg
Win	16–3	(India) Rohit Singh	5–3	April 11, 2024	2024 Asian Championships	Bishkek, Kyrgyzstan
Win	15–3	(North Korea) Han Hyon-song	TF 10–0	April 11, 2024	2024 Asian Championships	Bishkek, Kyrgyzstan
Loss	14–3	(Mongolia) Tömör-Ochiryn Tulga	Fall	April 11, 2024	2024 Asian Championships	Bishkek, Kyrgyzstan
2024 Yasar Dogu International (gold) at 61 kg
Win	14–2	(Turkey) Emre Kural	TF 10–0	March 10, 2024	2024 Yasar Dogu Tournament	Antalya, Turkey
Win	13–2	(Iran) Reza Atri	4–0	March 10, 2024	2024 Yasar Dogu Tournament	Antalya, Turkey
Win	12–2	(Iran) Reza Momeni	TF 11–0	March 10, 2024	2024 Yasar Dogu Tournament	Antalya, Turkey
Win	11–2	(Kyrgyzstan) Taiyrbek Zhumashbek Uulu	TF 11–0	March 10, 2024	2024 Yasar Dogu Tournament	Antalya, Turkey
Win	10–2	(Kazakhstan) Ossimzhan Dastanbek	6–2	March 10, 2024	2024 Yasar Dogu Tournament	Antalya, Turkey
2023 Japan Nationals (silver) at 65 kg
Loss	9–2	(Japan) Kotaro Kiyooka	TF 0–11	December 21–24, 2023	2023 Japan National Championships – Emperor's Cup	Tokyo, Japan
Win	9–1	(Japan) Ryoma Anraku	8–4	December 21–24, 2023	2023 Japan National Championships – Emperor's Cup	Tokyo, Japan
Win	8–1	(Japan) Ryuto Sakaki	6–0	December 21–24, 2023	2023 Japan National Championships – Emperor's Cup	Tokyo, Japan
Win	7–1	(Japan) Takumi Akiyama	6–2	December 21–24, 2023	2023 Japan National Championships – Emperor's Cup	Tokyo, Japan
Win	6–1	(Japan) Shotaro Suwama	TF 10–0	December 21–24, 2023	2023 Japan National Championships – Emperor's Cup	Tokyo, Japan
2022 National Sports Festival (gold) at 57 kg
Win	5–1	(Japan) Arai Rikuto	5–0	October 2–5, 2022	2022 National Sports Festival	Ashikaga, Tochigi, Japan
Win	4–1	(Japan) Yamane Noriyuki	1–1	October 2–5, 2022	2022 National Sports Festival	Ashikaga, Tochigi, Japan
Win	3–1	(Japan) Ogawa Hayata	8–5	October 2–5, 2022	2022 National Sports Festival	Ashikaga, Tochigi, Japan
Win	2–1	(Japan) Furuhon Takayoshi	TF 12–0	October 2–5, 2022	2022 National Sports Festival	Ashikaga, Tochigi, Japan
Win	1–1	(Japan) Sota Ogawa	8–0	October 2–5, 2022	2022 National Sports Festival	Ashikaga, Tochigi, Japan
2022 Japan Nationals 11th at 57 kg
Loss	0–1	(Japan) Rikuto Arai	0–4	June 16–19, 2022	2022 Japan National Championships – Meiji Cup	Tokyo, Japan
