= 2026 European Wrestling Championships – Men's freestyle 61 kg =

Wrestling competition

Men's freestyle 61 kg at the 2026 European Wrestling Championships
- Venue: Tirana Olympic Park
- Location: Tirana, Albania
- Dates: 25-26 April
- Competitors: 14

Medalists
gold medal	Zaur Uguev
silver medal	Zelimkhan Abakarov	Albania
bronze medal	Arsen Harutyunyan	Armenia
bronze medal	Simone Piroddu	Italy

The men's freestyle 61 kg is a competition featured at the 2026 European Wrestling Championships, and was held in Tirana, Albania on April 25 and 26.

== Results ==
Legend

- F — Won by fall

=== Main bracket ===
Round of 16
Dzmitry Shamela (UWW)	4
Erdal Galip (BUL)	1
Vladimir Egorov (MKD)	0
Arsen Harutyunyan (ARM)	11
Emrah Ormanoğlu (TUR)	4
Kamil Kerymov (UKR)	8
Zelimkhan Abakarov (ALB)	12
Simone Piroddu (ITA)	2
Nils Leutert (SUI)	0
Niklas Stechele (GER)	11
Giorgi Goniashvili (GEO)	2
Leonid Colesnic (MDA)	12

Quarterfinals
Zaur Uguev (UWW)	11
Dzmitry Shamela (UWW)	2
Arsen Harutyunyan (ARM)	11
Kamil Kerymov (UKR)	1
Zelimkhan Abakarov (ALB)	6
Niklas Stechele (GER)	2
Leonid Colesnic (MDA)	6
Nuraddin Novruzov (AZE)	17

Semifinals
Zaur Uguev (UWW)	4^{F}
Arsen Harutyunyan (ARM)	3
Zelimkhan Abakarov (ALB)	14
Nuraddin Novruzov (AZE)	3

Final
Zaur Uguev (UWW)	4
Zelimkhan Abakarov (ALB)	0

=== Repechage ===
Repechage round 1
Simone Piroddu (ITA)	6
Niklas Stechele (GER)	3

Bronze medal matches
Dzmitry Shamela (UWW)	2
Arsen Harutyunyan (ARM)	7
Simone Piroddu (ITA)	11^{F}
Nuraddin Novruzov (AZE)	8

== Final standing ==
Rank	Athlete
1st place, gold medalist(s)	Zaur Uguev (UWW)
2nd place, silver medalist(s)	Zelimkhan Abakarov (ALB)
3rd place, bronze medalist(s)	Arsen Harutyunyan (ARM)
3rd place, bronze medalist(s)	Simone Piroddu (ITA)
5	Dzmitry Shamela (UWW)
5	Nuraddin Novruzov (AZE)
7	Niklas Stechele (GER)
8	Leonid Colesnic (MDA)
9	Kamil Kerymov (UKR)
10	Emrah Ormanoğlu (TUR)
11	Giorgi Goniashvili (GEO)
12	Erdal Galip (BUL)
13	Vladimir Egorov (MKD)
14	Nils Leutert (SUI)
