= Tseveensürengiin Tsogbadrakh =

Mongolian freestyle wrestler

Tseveensuren Tsogbadrakh ᠴᠡᠪᠡᠭᠡᠨᠰᠦᠷᠦᠩ ᠦᠨ ᠴᠣᠭᠪᠠᠳᠠᠷᠠᠬᠤ
Personal information
- Native name: Цэвээнсүрэн Цогбадрах
- Nationality: Mongolia
- Born: 1 January 1998 (age 28) Ulaanbaatar, Mongolia
- Employer: Mongolian Armed Forces: Junior Sergeant
- Height: 1.70 m (5 ft 7 in)

Sport
- Country: Mongolia
- Sport: Amateur wrestling
- Weight class: 65 kg
- Event: Freestyle
- Club: Aldar Sports Committee
- Coached by: Ganzorigiin Mandakhnaran

Achievements and titles
- World finals: (bronze) (2024)
- National finals: (gold) (2018, 2022, 2024, 2025)
Medal record
Men's freestyle wrestling
Representing Mongolia
World Championships
Bronze medal – third place	2024 Tirana	61 kg
Asian Championships
Disqualified	2025 Amman	65 kg
World Military Championships
Silver medal – second place	2023 Baku	65 kg
Golden Grand Prix Ivan Yarygin
Bronze medal – third place	2018 Krasnoyarsk	57 kg
Grand Prix
Silver medal – second place	2022 Warsaw	65 kg
Bronze medal – third place	2023 Taraz	65 kg
Asian Cadets Championships
Bronze medal – third place	2013 Ulaanbaatar	46 kg
- Updated on 16-09-2026

Tseveensuren Tsogbadrakh is a Mongolian freestyle wrestler. He won one of the bronze medals in the men's 61 kg event at the 2024 World Wrestling Championships held in Tirana, Albania.

== Wrestling career ==
On 23 April 2022 in Ulan Bator at the Asian Championships in the bout for the bronze medal lost to Japan's Kaiki Yamaguchi, taking the final 5th place. On 19 April 2024, he competed at the Asian Qualifying Tournament in Bishkek, where he lost in the quarter finals to Ernazar Akmataliev of Kyrgyzstan, leaving him without a licence.

At the 2024 World Wrestling Championships in Tirana, Albania, he won the bronze medal in the men's freestyle 61 kg third-place match against Azerbaijan's Nuraddin Novruzov with an 8–2 lead. Tseveensürengiin Tsogbadrakh defeated Aryan Tsiutryn of Belarus 2–1 in the first round, Kyrgyz Taiyrbek Zhumashbek Uulu 3–0 in the second round, and Iranian Reza Momeni 3–1 in the quarterfinal to reach the semifinal. He lost to Turkish Ahmet Duman 3–1 in the semifinal and reached the bronze medal match.

In 2026, Mongolian wrestler Tsogbadrakh Tseveensuren was sanctioned after testing positive for testosterone, a prohibited substance under the World Anti-Doping Agency (WADA) Prohibited List. The sample was collected during the 2025 Senior Asian Championships on 29 March 2025. Following results management conducted by the International Testing Agency (ITA) on behalf of United World Wrestling (UWW), the Anti-Doping Division of the Court of Arbitration for Sport (CAS ADD) imposed a four-year period of ineligibility from 19 June 2025 until 18 June 2029, and all competitive results obtained between 29 March 2025 and 19 June 2025 were disqualified.
