= Ahmad Javan =

Iranian wrestler

Personal information
- Full name: Ahmad Mohammadnejad Javan
- Born: 21 November 2003 (age 22) Mashhad, Iran

Sport
- Sport: Amateur wrestling
- Weight class: 61 kg
- Event: Freestyle wrestling
Medal record
Men's Freestyle wrestling
Representing Iran
World Championships
Gold medal – first place	2026 Astana	61 kg
Silver medal – second place	2025 Zagreb	61 kg
Asian Championships
Bronze medal – third place	2025 Amman	61 kg
Bronze medal – third place	2026 Bishkek	61 kg

Ahmad Mohammadnejad Javan (Persian: احمد محمدنژاد جوان, born 21 November 2003 in Mashhad) is an Iranian freestyle wrestler. He won the god medal at the 2026 World Wrestling Championships. He had previously won silver at the 2025 World Wrestling Championships.
