= 2024 European Wrestling Championships – Men's freestyle 61 kg =

Wrestling competition

Men's freestyle 61 kg at the 2024 European Wrestling Championships
- Venue: Polyvalent Hall
- Location: Bucharest, Romania
- Dates: 17-18 February
- Competitors: 17

Medalists
gold medal	Abasgadzhi Magomedov	Individual Neutral Athletes
silver medal	Zelimkhan Abakarov	Albania
bronze medal	Nuraddin Novruzov	Azerbaijan
bronze medal	Mezhlum Mezhlumyan	Armenia

The men's freestyle 61 kg is a competition featured at the 2024 European Wrestling Championships, and was held in Bucharest, Romania on February 17 and 18.

== Results ==
Legend

- F — Won by fall
- R — Retired

=== Final ===
Final
Abasgadzhi Magomedov (AIN)	7
Zelimkhan Abakarov (ALB)	4

=== Top half ===
Round of 32
Nuraddin Novruzov (AZE)	8
Vladimir Egorov (MKD)	4

Round of 16
Abasgadzhi Magomedov (AIN)	10
Nils Leutert (SUI)	0
Nuraddin Novruzov (AZE)	15
Nebi Uzun (TUR)	4
Leonid Colesnic (MDA)	1
Georgi Vangelov (BUL)	8
Arman Eloyan (FRA)	1
Andrei Bekreneu (AIN)	3

Quarterfinals
Abasgadzhi Magomedov (AIN)	10
Nuraddin Novruzov (AZE)	0
Georgi Vangelov (BUL)	3
Andrei Bekreneu (AIN)	1

Semifinals
Abasgadzhi Magomedov (AIN)	2
Georgi Vangelov (BUL)	0^{R}

=== Bottom half ===
Round of 32

Round of 16
Valentyn Bliasetskyi (UKR)	12
Daniel Popov (ISR)	1
Ivan Guidea (ROU)	2
Niklas Stechele (GER)	11^{F}
Mezhlum Mezhlumyan (ARM)	0
Zelimkhan Abakarov (ALB)	9
Levan Metreveli (ESP)	0
Shota Phartenadze (GEO)	3

Quarterfinals
Valentyn Bliasetskyi (UKR)	2
Niklas Stechele (GER)	6
Zelimkhan Abakarov (ALB)	7
Shota Phartenadze (GEO)	5

Semifinals
Niklas Stechele (GER)	0
Zelimkhan Abakarov (ALB)	11

=== Repechage ===
Repechage round 2
Nils Leutert (SUI)	2
Nuraddin Novruzov (AZE)	12
Mezhlum Mezhlumyan (ARM)	5
Shota Phartenadze (GEO)	4

Bronze medal match
Nuraddin Novruzov (AZE)	7
Georgi Vangelov (BUL)	3
Mezhlum Mezhlumyan (ARM)	7
Niklas Stechele (GER)	5

== Final standing ==
Rank	Athlete
1st place, gold medalist(s)	Abasgadzhi Magomedov (AIN)
2nd place, silver medalist(s)	Zelimkhan Abakarov (ALB)
3rd place, bronze medalist(s)	Nuraddin Novruzov (AZE)
3rd place, bronze medalist(s)	Mezhlum Mezhlumyan (ARM)
5	Georgi Vangelov (BUL)
5	Niklas Stechele (GER)
7	Valentyn Bliasetskyi (UKR)
8	Shota Phartenadze (GEO)
9	Andrei Bekreneu (AIN)
10	Vladimir Egorov (MKD)
11	Nebi Uzun (TUR)
12	Nils Leutert (SUI)
13	Arman Eloyan (FRA)
14	Leonid Colesnic (MDA)
15	Daniel Popov (ISR)
16	Ivan Guidea (ROU)
17	Levan Metreveli (ESP)
