= 2022 European Wrestling Championships – Men's freestyle 61 kg =

Wrestling competition

Men's freestyle 61 kg at the 2022 European Wrestling Championships
- Venue: BOK Sports Hall
- Location: Budapest, Hungary
- Dates: 29-30 March
- Competitors: 13

Medalists
| gold medal | Arsen Harutyunyan | Armenia |
| silver medal | Süleyman Atlı | Turkey |
| bronze medal | Eduard Grigorev | Poland |
| bronze medal | Georgi Vangelov | Bulgaria |

The men's freestyle 61 kg was a competition featured at the 2022 European Wrestling Championships, and was held in Budapest, Hungary on March 29 and 30.

== Results ==
Legend

- F — Won by fall
- WO — Won by walkover

=== Main Bracket ===
1/8 finals
Adam Biboulatov (FRA) | 5
Besir Alili (MKD) | 11
Adam Al Kandoussi (NED) | 0
Zelimkhan Abakarov (ALB) | 11
Shamil Omarov (ITA) | 1
Eduard Grigorev (POL) | 2
Teimuraz Vanishvili (GEO) | 6
Gamzatgadzsi Halidov (HUN) | 7
Viktor Lyzen (GER) | 0
Islam Bazarganov (AZE) | 4

Quarterfinals
Arsen Harutyunyan (ARM) | 5^{F}
Besir Alili (MKD) | 0
Zelimkhan Abakarov (ALB) | 3
Eduard Grigorev (POL) | 6
Süleyman Atlı (TUR) | WO
Gamzatgadzsi Halidov (HUN)
Islam Bazarganov (AZE) | 2
Georgi Vangelov (BUL) | 5

Semifinals
Arsen Harutyunyan (ARM) | 13
Eduard Grigorev (POL) | 8
Süleyman Atlı (TUR) | 6
Georgi Vangelov (BUL) | 3

Final
Arsen Harutyunyan (ARM) | 15
Süleyman Atlı (TUR) | 3

=== Repechage ===
Bronze medal match
Besir Alili (MKD) | 2
Eduard Grigorev (POL) | 12
Gamzatgadzsi Halidov (HUN)
Georgi Vangelov (BUL) | WO

== Final standing ==
| Rank | Wrestler | UWW Points |
|---|---|---|
| 1st place, gold medalist(s) | Arsen Harutyunyan (ARM) | 13000 |
| 2nd place, silver medalist(s) | Süleyman Atlı (TUR) | 11000 |
| 3rd place, bronze medalist(s) | Georgi Vangelov (BUL) | 9500 |
| 3rd place, bronze medalist(s) | Eduard Grigorev (POL) | 9500 |
| 5 | Besir Alili (MKD) | 8000 |
| 5 | Gamzatgadzsi Halidov (HUN) | 8000 |
| 7 | Zelimkhan Abakarov (ALB) | 7400 |
| 8 | Islam Bazarganov (AZE) | 7000 |
| 9 | Teimuraz Vanishvili (GEO) | 6500 |
| 10 | Adam Biboulatov (FRA) | 6100 |
| 11 | Shamil Omarov (ITA) | 4000 |
| 12 | Viktor Lyzen (GER) | 3800 |
| 13 | Adam Al Kandoussi (NED) | 3600 |
