= 2020 Individual Wrestling World Cup – Men's freestyle 57 kg =

The men's freestyle 57 kilograms is a competition featured at the 2020 Individual Wrestling World Cup, and was held in Belgrade, Serbia on 16 and 17 December 2020.

== Medalists ==
Gold	Zaur Uguev; Russia
Silver	Arsen Harutyunyan; Armenia
Bronze	Andriy Yatsenko; Ukraine
Bronze	Rahman Amouzad; Iran

== Results ==
Legend

- F — Won by fall
- R — Retired

1/16 finals
	Score	
Levan Metreveli (ESP)	2–4	Gamzatgadzsi Halidov (HUN)
Uladzislau Andreyeu (BLR)	10–0	Chakir Ansari (MAR)
Anatolii Buruian (MDA)	0–11	Zaur Uguev (RUS)
~~Gamal Al-Sabri (YEM)~~		~~Mohamed Camara (GUI)~~
Abdelhak Kherbache (ALG)	0–10	Bekbolot Myrzanazar Uulu (KGZ)
Minir Redjepi (MKD)	0–13	Diamantino Iuna Fafé (GBS)
Adam Biboulatov (FRA)	2–12	Niklas Stechele (GER)
Şaban Kızıltaş (TUR)	0–10	Rahman Amouzad (IRI)
Givi Davidovi (ITA)	10–0	Richard García (PAN)

1/8 finals
Arsen Harutyunyan (ARM)	7
Răzvan Kovacs (ROU)	0
Islam Bazarganov (AZE)	2
Andriy Yatsenko (UKR)	5
Mikyay Naim (BUL)	4
Stevan Mićić (SRB)	5
Ravi Kumar Dahiya (IND)	6
Gamzatgadzsi Halidov (HUN)	4^{F}
Uladzislau Andreyeu (BLR)	0
Zaur Uguev (RUS)	11
Bye
Bekbolot Myrzanazar Uulu (KGZ)
Diamantino Iuna Fafé (GBS)	5
Niklas Stechele (GER)	3
Rahman Amouzad (IRI)	11
Givi Davidovi (ITA)	0

Quarterfinals
Arsen Harutyunyan (ARM)	5
Andriy Yatsenko (UKR)	4
Stevan Mićić (SRB)	10
Gamzatgadzsi Halidov (HUN)	3
Zaur Uguev (RUS)	9
Bekbolot Myrzanazar Uulu (KGZ)	0
Diamantino Iuna Fafé (GBS)	0
Rahman Amouzad (IRI)	9^{F}

Semifinals
Arsen Harutyunyan (ARM)	7
Stevan Mićić (SRB)	4
Zaur Uguev (RUS)	4^{F}
Rahman Amouzad (IRI)	1

Final
Arsen Harutyunyan (ARM)	0
Zaur Uguev (RUS)	10

Repechage round 1
Anatolii Buruian (MDA)	0^{R}
Uladzislau Andreyeu (BLR)	6

Repechage round 2
Răzvan Kovacs (ROU)	5
Andriy Yatsenko (UKR)	6
Uladzislau Andreyeu (BLR)	2
Bekbolot Myrzanazar Uulu (KGZ)	2

Bronze medals
Andriy Yatsenko (UKR)	4
Stevan Mićić (SRB)	2
Uladzislau Andreyeu (BLR)	0
Rahman Amouzad (IRI)	4
