= 2023 U23 World Wrestling Championships – Men's freestyle 61 kg =

Wrestling competitions

Men's freestyle 61 kg at the 2023 U23 World Championships
- Venue: Tirana Olympic Park
- Dates: 23–24 October
- Competitors: 19 from 16 nations

Medalists
| gold medal | Bashir Magomedov | Authorised Neutral Athletes |
| silver medal | Assylzhan Yessengeldi | Kazakhstan |
| bronze medal | Mezhlum Mezhlumyan | Armenia |
| bronze medal | Taiyrbek Zhumashbek Uulu | Kyrgyzstan |

The men's freestyle 61 kg is a competition featured at the 2023 U23 World Wrestling Championships, and was held in Tirana, Albania on 23 and 24 October 2023.

This freestyle wrestling competition consists of a single-elimination tournament, with a repechage used to determine the winner of two bronze medals. The two finalists face off for gold and silver medals. Each wrestler who loses to one of the two finalists moves into the repechage, culminating in a pair of bronze medal matches featuring the semifinal losers each facing the remaining repechage opponent from their half of the bracket.

== Results ==
Legend

- F — Won by fall
- WO — Won by walkover

=== Final ===
| Final |
| Bashir Magomedov (ANA) | 4 |
| Assylzhan Yessengeldi (KAZ) | 0 |

=== Top half ===
Round of 32
Dylan Shawver (PUR) | 6
Besir Alili (MKD) | 10

Round of 16
Konstantin Gutsev (BUL) | 0
Ivan Hramyka (ANA) | 7
Besir Alili (MKD) | 0
Nika Zakashvili (GEO) | 9
Bashir Magomedov (ANA) | 11
Mezhlum Mezhlumyan (ARM) | 0
Antonio Margiotta (PHI) | 0
Julian Chlebove (USA) | 11

Quarterfinals
Ivan Hramyka (ANA) | 8
Nika Zakashvili (GEO) | 4
Bashir Magomedov (ANA) | 14
Julian Chlebove (USA) | 3

Semifinals
Ivan Hramyka (ANA) | 0
Bashir Magomedov (ANA) | 10

=== Bottom half ===
Round of 32
Vasile Marcu (MDA) | 6
Akash Dahiya (UWW) | 16
Garette Saunders (CAN) | 0
Emre Kural (TUR) | 10

Round of 16
Assylzhan Yessengeldi (KAZ) | 9
Kaito Morita (JPN) | 6
Akash Dahiya (UWW) | 8
Endrio Avdyli (ALB) | 0
Jeyhun Allahverdiyev (AZE) | 4
Emre Kural (TUR) | 1
~~Andrii Dzhelep (UKR)~~
Taiyrbek Zhumashbek Uulu (KGZ) | WO

Quarterfinals
Assylzhan Yessengeldi (KAZ) | 4^{F}
Akash Dahiya (UWW) | 0
Jeyhun Allahverdiyev (AZE) | 5
Taiyrbek Zhumashbek Uulu (KGZ) | 8

Semifinals
Assylzhan Yessengeldi (KAZ) | 9
Taiyrbek Zhumashbek Uulu (KGZ) | 7

=== Repechage ===
Repechage round 2
Mezhlum Mezhlumyan (ARM) | 11
Julian Chlebove (USA) | 0
Kaito Morita (JPN) | 6
Akash Dahiya (UWW) | 7

Bronze medals
Mezhlum Mezhlumyan (ARM) | 11
Ivan Hramyka (ANA) | 0
Akash Dahiya (UWW) | 0
Taiyrbek Zhumashbek Uulu (KGZ) | 7

== Final standing ==
| Rank | Athlete |
|---|---|
| 1st place, gold medalist(s) | Bashir Magomedov (ANA) |
| 2nd place, silver medalist(s) | Assylzhan Yessengeldi (KAZ) |
| 3rd place, bronze medalist(s) | Mezhlum Mezhlumyan (ARM) |
| 3rd place, bronze medalist(s) | Taiyrbek Zhumashbek Uulu (KGZ) |
| 5 | Ivan Hramyka (ANA) |
| 5 | Akash Dahiya (UWW) |
| 7 | Julian Chlebove (USA) |
| 8 | Emre Kural (TUR) |
| 9 | Nika Zakashvili (GEO) |
| 10 | Jeyhun Allahverdiyev (AZE) |
| 11 | Besir Alili (MKD) |
| 12 | Kaito Morita (JPN) |
| 13 | Dylan Shawver (PUR) |
| 14 | Vasile Marcu (MDA) |
| 15 | Konstantin Gutsev (BUL) |
| 16 | Endrio Avdyli (ALB) |
| 17 | Garette Saunders (CAN) |
| 18 | Antonio Margiotta (PHI) |
| — | Andrii Dzhelep (UKR) |
