= Caleb Smith (wrestler) =

Stateside Puerto Rican freestyle wrestler (born 2001)

Personal information
- Full name: Caleb Lee Smith
- Born: May 24, 2001 (age 25) High Point, North Carolina, U.S.

Sport
- Country: Puerto Rico
- Sport: Wrestling
- Events: Freestyle and Folkstyle
- College team: Appalachian State; Nebraska
Medal record
Men's freestyle wrestling
Representing Puerto Rico
Pan American Championships
Silver medal – second place	2026 Coralville	61 kg
Men's collegiate wrestling
Representing the Appalachian State Mountaineers
SoCon Championships
Gold medal – first place	2023 Boone	125 lb
Representing the Nebraska Cornhuskers
Big Ten Championships
Silver medal – second place	2025 Evanston	125 lb

Caleb Lee Smith (born May 24, 2001) is a stateside Puerto Rican freestyle wrestler and graduated folkstyle wrestler. As a folkstyle wrestler, he was a two-time NCAA Division I All-American. He represents Puerto Rico in freestyle wrestling, and competed for Puerto Rico at 61 kg at the 2026 World Championships.

== High school career ==
Smith attended Southwest Guilford High School in High Point, North Carolina. As a high school wrestler, he complied a 186–21 career record, placing at the state tournament three times and was the 2019 North Carolina 3A state champion at 126-pounds. Smith also placed third at the NHSCA High School Nationals Senior Division, earning All-American honors.

== College career ==
Smith spent his first four seasons at Appalachian State University in Boone, North Carolina. While at Appalachian State, he was a two-time NCAA national qualifier and a Southern Conference champion. Smith graduated from Appalachian State with a degree in marketing. Smith spent his remaining athletic eligibility as a graduate transfer at the University of Nebraska–Lincoln. While at Nebraska, he was a two-time Big Ten Conference placer and one-time finalist, as well as a two-time NCAA All-American.

== Freestyle wrestling career ==
As a freestyle wrestler on the senior level, Smith represents Puerto Rico. He placed second at the 2026 Pan American Championships at 61 kg. He also earned the 61 kg spot for Puerto Rico at the 2026 World Championships.
