= Arsen Harutyunyan (wrestler) =

Armenian wrestler (born 1999)

Arsen Harutyunyan Արսեն Հարությունյան
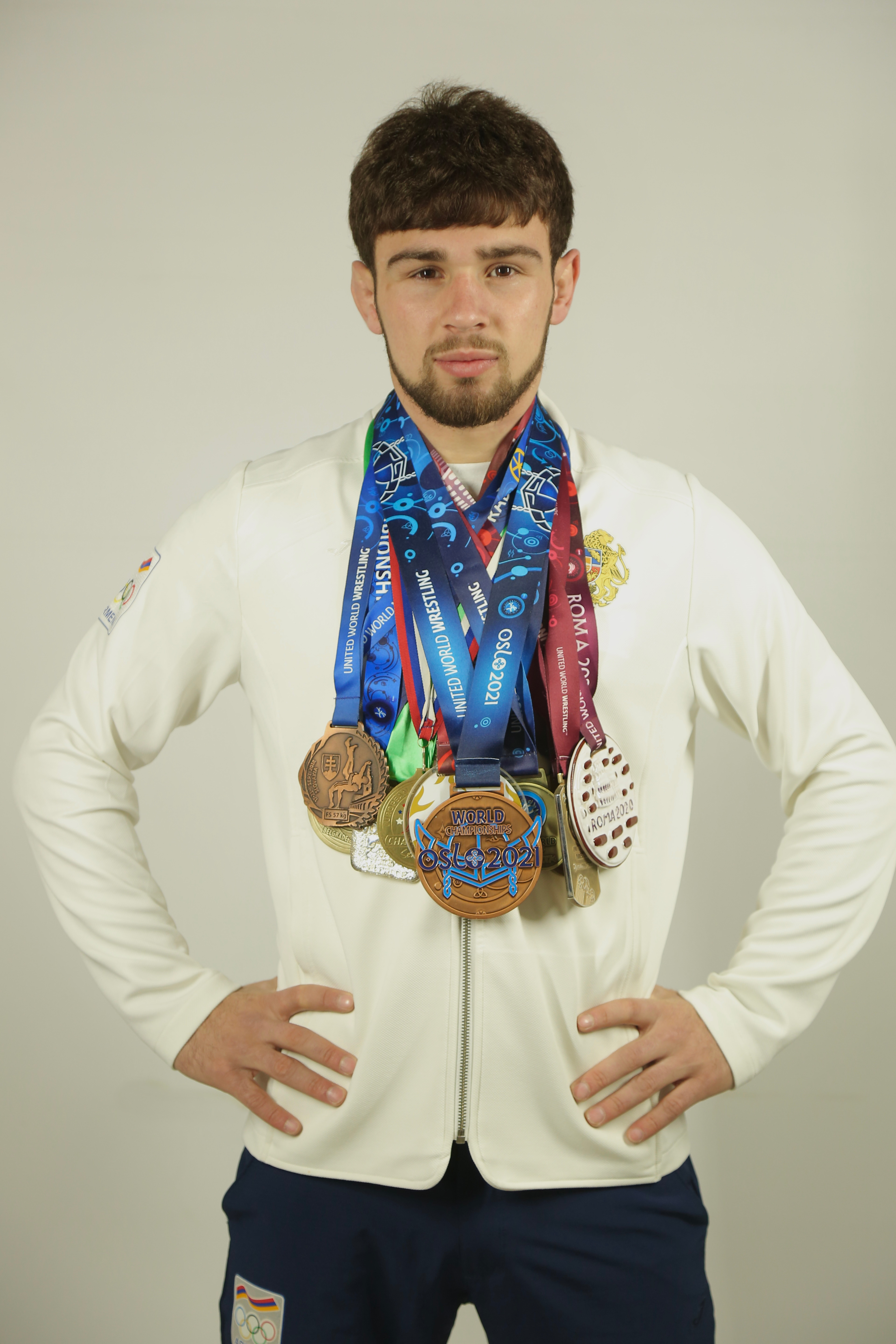

Personal information
- Native name: Արսեն Կարենի Հարությունյան
- Born: Arsen Karen Harutyunyan; 22 November 1999 (age 26) Masis, Armenia
- Height: 165 cm (5 ft 5 in)
- Weight: 63 kg (139 lb)

Sport
- Country: Armenia
- Sport: Wrestling
- Weight class: 57-61 kg
- Event: Freestyle Wrestling
- Club: Olympic Reserve Training Centre, Yerevan
- Coached by: Arshak Hayrapetyan; Gevorg Vardanyan
Medal record
Men's freestyle wrestling
Representing Armenia
World Championships
Bronze medal – third place	2021 Oslo	61 kg
Bronze medal – third place	2022 Belgrade	61 kg
Bronze medal – third place	2023 Belgrade	57 kg
Bronze medal – third place	2025 Zagreb	57 kg
European Championships
Gold medal – first place	2019 Bucharest	61 kg
Gold medal – first place	2022 Budapest	61 kg
Gold medal – first place	2023 Zagreb	61 kg
Gold medal – first place	2024 Bucharest	57 kg
Silver medal – second place	2025 Bratislava	61 kg
Bronze medal – third place	2020 Rome	61 kg
Bronze medal – third place	2026 Tirana	61 kg
Individual World Cup
Silver medal – second place	2020 Belgrade	57 kg
Grand Prix
Gold medal – first place	2024 Budapest	61 kg
Bronze medal – third place	2023 Alexandria	61 kg
World U23 Championships
Gold medal – first place	2022 Pontevedra	61 kg
Gold medal – first place	2021 Belgrade	61 kg
World Juniors Championships
Bronze medal – third place	2018 Trnava	57 kg
Bronze medal – third place	2017 Tampere	55 kg
European Juniors Championships
Gold medal – first place	2018 Rome	57 kg
Bronze medal – third place	2017 Dortmund	57 kg
European Cadets Championships
Silver medal – second place	2016 Stockholm	54 kg
Gold medal – first place	2015 Subotica	46 kg

Arsen Karen Harutyunyan (Armenian: Արսեն Կարենի Հարությունյան; born 22 November 1999) is an Armenian freestyle wrestler. He is a two-time European champion (2019, 2022) and a two-time U23 world champion (2021, 2022) in the 61 kg category. He also won bronze medals at the World Championships in 2021 and 2022. Harutyunyan has represented Armenia at the Olympic Games, competing in the 2020 Tokyo Olympics in the men's 57 kg event. He is the current RAF Bantamweight Champion.

== Early life and education ==
Harutyunyan was born on 23 November 1999 in Masis, Armenia. He began wrestling under the guidance of coach Artur Martoyan and later trained at the Yerevan State Sports College of Olympic Reserve with Arshak Hayrapetyan.

From 2018 to 2021, he studied at the Armenian State Institute of Physical Culture and Sport, earning a degree with distinction. He later completed a master's degree in gymnastics in 2023.

== Wrestling career ==
Harutyunyan first gained recognition in 2018, winning gold in the 57 kg category at the European U20 Wrestling Championships. That same year, he claimed his first Armenian senior national title and debuted in the German Bundesliga (wrestling).

In 2019, he won his first senior European Wrestling Championships gold medal in the 61 kg category, defeating Beka Lomtadze (Georgia) in the final by a score of 17–11.

At the 2020 European Wrestling Championships, he won bronze in the 61 kg category, defeating Georgios Pilidis of Greece.

Harutyunyan qualified for the 2020 Summer Olympics in Tokyo, competing in the men's 57 kg event.

In 2021, he won bronze at the World Wrestling Championships, losing in the semifinals to Daton Fix. He also became U23 world champion in 2021 and defended his title in 2022.

In 2022, he won his second senior European Championship gold medal, defeating Süleyman Atlı (Turkey) in the final. Later that year, he claimed another bronze at the 2022 World Wrestling Championships.

Harutyunyan was scheduled to face Rei Higuchi at RAF 10 on 13 June 2026. However, Higuchi withdrew for undisclosed reasons and was replaced by Caleb Smith. Harutyunyan won by technical fall.

Harutyunyan faced Ben Davino on 18 July 2026 at RAF 11 and won by decision.

Harutyunyan defeated Austin DeSanto on 18 September 2026 at RAF 13 to claim the RAF Bantamweight Championship. This fight earned him a Performance of the Night award.

== Awards and honors ==
2022

- (gold) European Wrestling Championships – 61 kg, Budapest
- (gold) U23 World Wrestling Championships – 61 kg, Pontevedra
- (bronze) World Wrestling Championships – 61 kg, Belgrade

2021

- (gold) U23 World Wrestling Championships – 61 kg, Belgrade
- (bronze) World Wrestling Championships – 61 kg, Oslo

2020

- (silver) Individual World Cup – 57 kg, Belgrade
- (bronze) European Wrestling Championships – 61 kg, Rome

2019

- (gold) European Wrestling Championships – 61 kg, Bucharest

2018

- (gold) European U20 Wrestling Championships – 57 kg, Rome
- (bronze) World U20 Wrestling Championships – 57 kg, Trnava
- (gold) Armenian National Championships – 61 kg

2017

- (bronze) World U17 Wrestling Championships – 55 kg, Athens
- (bronze) European U17 Wrestling Championships – 55 kg, Sarajevo

2016

- (silver) European U17 Wrestling Championships – 54 kg, Stockholm

2015

- (gold) European U17 Wrestling Championships – 46 kg, Subotica

=== Olympic Games ===
- Competed in the 2020 Summer Olympics – Men's freestyle 57 kg
- Competed in the 2024 Summer Olympics – Men's freestyle 57 kg

== Personal life ==
Harutyunyan is the eldest of five children. His younger brother is also a freestyle wrestler and part of the Armenian youth national team.

In October 2022, he married Diana Adibekyan.
