= 2022 World Wrestling Championships – Men's freestyle 61 kg =

Men's freestyle 61 kg at the 2022 World Championships
- Venue: Štark Arena
- Dates: 17–18 September 2022
- Competitors: 24 from 24 nations

Medalists
gold medal	Rei Higuchi	Japan
silver medal	Reza Atri	Iran
bronze medal	Arsen Harutyunyan	Armenia
bronze medal	Narmandakhyn Narankhüü	Mongolia

The men's freestyle 61 kilograms is a competition featured at the 2022 World Wrestling Championships, and was held in Belgrade, Serbia on 17 and 18 September 2022.

This freestyle wrestling competition consists of a single-elimination tournament, with a repechage used to determine the winner of two bronze medals. The two finalists face off for gold and silver medals. Each wrestler who loses to one of the two finalists moves into the repechage, culminating in a pair of bronze medal matches featuring the semifinal losers each facing the remaining repechage opponent from their half of the bracket.

== Results ==
Legend

- R — Retired

=== Final ===
Final
Rei Higuchi (JPN)	10
Reza Atri (IRI)	0

=== Top half ===
Round of 32
Jahongirmirza Turobov (UZB)	5
Ali Aburumaila (PLE)	0
Liu Minghu (CHN)	0
Islam Dudaev (ALB)	5
Seth Gross (USA)	13
Andrii Dzhelep (UKR)	2
Nikolay Okhlopkov (ROU)	5
Joey Silva (PUR)	2

Round of 16
Arsen Harutyunyan (ARM)	12
Jahongirmirza Turobov (UZB)	2
Islam Dudaev (ALB)	0
Rei Higuchi (JPN)	11
Eduard Grigorev (POL)	0
Seth Gross (USA)	7
Nikolay Okhlopkov (ROU)	0
Süleyman Atlı (TUR)	10

Quarterfinals
Arsen Harutyunyan (ARM)	0
Rei Higuchi (JPN)	10
Seth Gross (USA)	10
Süleyman Atlı (TUR)	4

Semifinals
Rei Higuchi (JPN)	15
Seth Gross (USA)	7

=== Bottom half ===
Round of 32
Khamzat Arsamerzouev (FRA)	12
Jason-Guy Luneau (CAN)	2
Narmandakhyn Narankhüü (MGL)	11
Igor Chichioi (MDA)	0
Reza Atri (IRI)	11
Besir Alili (MKD)	1
Assyl Aitakyn (KAZ)	5
Pankaj Malik (IND)	4

Round of 16
Ulukbek Zholdoshbekov (KGZ)	6
Khamzat Arsamerzouev (FRA)	2
Narmandakhyn Narankhüü (MGL)	10
Teimuraz Vanishvili (GEO)	2
Islam Bazarganov (AZE)	0
Reza Atri (IRI)	4
Assyl Aitakyn (KAZ)	0
Georgi Vangelov (BUL)	11

Quarterfinals
Ulukbek Zholdoshbekov (KGZ)	5^{R}
Narmandakhyn Narankhüü (MGL)	13
Reza Atri (IRI)	6
Georgi Vangelov (BUL)	3

Semifinals
Narmandakhyn Narankhüü (MGL)	3
Reza Atri (IRI)	5

=== Repechage ===
Repechage round 1
Besir Alili (MKD)	1
Islam Bazarganov (AZE)	5

Repechage round 2
Islam Dudaev (ALB)	11
Arsen Harutyunyan (ARM)	12
Islam Bazarganov (AZE)	0
Georgi Vangelov (BUL)	4

Bronze medals
Arsen Harutyunyan (ARM)	12
Seth Gross (USA)	0
Georgi Vangelov (BUL)	0
Narmandakhyn Narankhüü (MGL)	9

== Final standing ==
Rank	Athlete
1st place, gold medalist(s)	Rei Higuchi (JPN)
2nd place, silver medalist(s)	Reza Atri (IRI)
3rd place, bronze medalist(s)	Arsen Harutyunyan (ARM)
3rd place, bronze medalist(s)	Narmandakhyn Narankhüü (MGL)
5	Seth Gross (USA)
5	Georgi Vangelov (BUL)
7	Khamzat Arsamerzouev (FRA)
8	Süleyman Atlı (TUR)
9	Islam Dudaev (ALB)
10	Jahongirmirza Turobov (UZB)
11	Ulukbek Zholdoshbekov (KGZ)
12	Islam Bazarganov (AZE)
13	Nikolay Okhlopkov (ROU)
14	Assyl Aitakyn (KAZ)
15	Besir Alili (MKD)
16	Pankaj Malik (IND)
17	Joey Silva (PUR)
18	Teimuraz Vanishvili (GEO)
19	Jason-Guy Luneau (CAN)
20	Andrii Dzhelep (UKR)
21	Ali Aburumaila (PLE)
22	Liu Minghu (CHN)
23	Eduard Grigorev (POL)
24	Igor Chichioi (MDA)
