= 2017 World Wrestling Championships – Men's freestyle 57 kg =

Men's freestyle 57 kg at the 2017 World Championships
- Venue: AccorHotels Arena
- Dates: 25 August 2017
- Competitors: 29 from 29 nations

Medalists
gold medal	Yuki Takahashi	Japan
silver medal	Thomas Gilman	United States
bronze medal	Andriy Yatsenko	Ukraine
bronze medal	Erdenebatyn Bekhbayar	Mongolia

The men's freestyle 57 kilograms is a competition featured at the 2017 World Wrestling Championships, and was held in Paris, France on 25 August 2017.

This freestyle wrestling competition consisted of a single-elimination tournament, with a repechage used to determine the winners of two bronze medals. The two finalists faced off for gold and silver medals. Each wrestler who lost to one of the two finalists moved into the repechage, culminating in a pair of bronze medal matches featuring the semifinal losers each facing the remaining repechage opponent from their half of the bracket.

== Results ==
=== Final ===
Final
Thomas Gilman (USA)	0
Yuki Takahashi (JPN)	6

=== Top half ===
Round of 32
Garik Barseghyan (ARM)	10
Yuriy Holub (ISR)	2
Nodirjon Safarov (UZB)	7
Mahir Amiraslanov (AZE)	6
Asadulla Lachinau (BLR)	5
Zou Wanhao (CHN)	4
Zoheir El-Ouarraqe (FRA)	1
Reza Atri (IRI)	6
Andriy Yatsenko (UKR)	2
Thomas Gilman (USA)	5

Round of 16
Levan Metreveli (ESP)	0
Jong Hak-jin (PRK)	5
Nurislam Sanayev (KAZ)	8
Garik Barseghyan (ARM)	2
Nodirjon Safarov (UZB)	5
Asadulla Lachinau (BLR)	4
Reza Atri (IRI)	0
Thomas Gilman (USA)	3

Quarterfinals
Jong Hak-jin (PRK)	4
Nurislam Sanayev (KAZ)	3
Nodirjon Safarov (UZB)	1
Thomas Gilman (USA)	12

Semifinals
Jong Hak-jin (PRK)	4
Thomas Gilman (USA)	5

=== Bottom half ===
Round of 32
Erdenebatyn Bekhbayar (MGL)	12
Ulukbek Zholdoshbekov (KGZ)	0
Süleyman Atlı (TUR)	8
Beka Lomtadze (GEO)	8
Yuki Takahashi (JPN)	14
Aso Palani (CAN)	4
Sandeep Tomar (IND)	8
Zaur Uguev (RUS)	2
Kim Sung-gwon (KOR)	8
Vladimir Egorov (MKD)	4
Anatolii Buruian (MDA)	4
Andrei Dukov (ROU)	4
Chakir Ansari (MAR)	2
Givi Davidovi (ITA)	12
Juan Rubelín Ramírez (DOM)	0
Vladimir Dubov (BUL)	10

Round of 16
Erdenebatyn Bekhbayar (MGL)	7
Süleyman Atlı (TUR)	0
Yuki Takahashi (JPN)	14
Sandeep Tomar (IND)	3
Kim Sung-gwon (KOR)	3
Andrei Dukov (ROU)	0
Givi Davidovi (ITA)	0
Vladimir Dubov (BUL)	10

Quarterfinals
Erdenebatyn Bekhbayar (MGL)	4
Yuki Takahashi (JPN)	4
Kim Sung-gwon (KOR)	3
Vladimir Dubov (BUL)	8

Semifinals
Yuki Takahashi (JPN)	7
Vladimir Dubov (BUL)	2

=== Repechage ===
Repechage round 1
Andriy Yatsenko (UKR)	6
Reza Atri (IRI)	4
Aso Palani (CAN)	0
Sandeep Tomar (IND)	10

Repechage round 2
Andriy Yatsenko (UKR)	12
Nodirjon Safarov (UZB)	2
Sandeep Tomar (IND)	0
Erdenebatyn Bekhbayar (MGL)	10

Bronze medals
Andriy Yatsenko (UKR)	12
Jong Hak-jin (PRK)	2
Erdenebatyn Bekhbayar (MGL)	9
Vladimir Dubov (BUL)	2
