= Narmandakhyn Narankhüü =

Mongolian freestyle wrestler

Personal information
- Native name: Нармандахын Наранхүү
- Nationality: Mongolia
- Born: 20 April 2000 (age 26) Khongor, Darkhan, Mongolia
- Height: 164 cm (5 ft 5 in)

Sport
- Country: Mongolia
- Sport: Wrestling
- Weight class: 61 kg
- Event: Freestyle

Achievements and titles
- World finals: (bronze) (2022)
Medal record
Men's freestyle wrestling
Representing Mongolia
World Championships
Bronze medal – third place	2022 Belgrade	61 kg
Grand Prix
Silver medal – second place	2023 Zagreb	61 kg
U23 Word Championships
Bronze medal – third place	2021 Belgrade	61 kg
U17 Asian Championships
Bronze medal – third place	2017 Bangkok	50 kg

Narmandakhyn Narankhüü (Mongolian: Нармандахын Наранхүү; born 20 April 2000) is a Mongolian freestyle wrestler who competes in the 61 kg division.

In 2021, he won a bronze medal at the U-23 World Wrestling Championships in Belgrade, Serbia. In 2022, he won a bronze medal at the World Championships. In February 2023, he came in second at the Zagreb Open.
