= 2021 World Wrestling Championships – Men's freestyle 57 kg =

Wrestling competitions

Men's freestyle 57 kg at the 2021 World Championships
- Venue: Nye Jordal Amfi
- Dates: 3–4 October 2021
- Competitors: 22 from 22 nations

Medalists
gold medal	Thomas Gilman	United States
silver medal	Alireza Sarlak	Iran
bronze medal	Horst Lehr	Germany
bronze medal	Aryan Tsiutryn	Belarus

The men's freestyle 57 kilograms is a competition featured at the 2021 World Wrestling Championships, and was held in Oslo, Norway on 3 and 4 October.

This freestyle wrestling competition consists of a single-elimination tournament, with a repechage used to determine the winner of two bronze medals. The two finalists face off for gold and silver medals. Each wrestler who loses to one of the two finalists moves into the repechage, culminating in a pair of bronze medal matches featuring the semifinal losers each facing the remaining repechage opponent from their half of the bracket.

== Results ==
Legend

- F — Won by fall

=== Final ===
Final
Thomas Gilman (USA)	5
Alireza Sarlak (IRI)	3

=== Top half ===
Round of 32

Round of 16
Thomas Gilman (USA)	3^{F}
Abubakar Mutaliev (RWF)	0
Vladimir Egorov (MKD)	11
Park Chang-jun (KOR)	0
Roman Hutsuliak (UKR)	0
Horst Lehr (GER)	2
Afgan Khashalov (AZE)	8
Roberto Alejandro (MEX)	8

Quarterfinals
Thomas Gilman (USA)	11
Vladimir Egorov (MKD)	1
Horst Lehr (GER)	4
Afgan Khashalov (AZE)	1

Semifinals
Thomas Gilman (USA)	15
Horst Lehr (GER)	5

=== Bottom half ===
Round of 32
Guesseppe Rea (ECU)	10
Gamal Al-Sabri (YEM)	0
Aryan Tsiutryn (BLR)	11
Goga Dzigua (GEO)	1
Erdenebatyn Bekhbayar (MGL)	10
Meirambek Kartbay (KAZ)	5
Toshiya Abe (JPN)	8
Darthe Capellan (CAN)	3
Simon Wainaina (KEN)	0
Mikyay Naim (BUL)	10
Pankaj Malik (IND)	4
Levan Metreveli (ESP)	3

Round of 16
Alireza Sarlak (IRI)	11
Guesseppe Rea (ECU)	0
Aryan Tsiutryn (BLR)	3
Erdenebatyn Bekhbayar (MGL)	1
Toshiya Abe (JPN)	3
Mikyay Naim (BUL)	3
Pankaj Malik (IND)	0
Süleyman Atlı (TUR)	10

Quarterfinals
Alireza Sarlak (IRI)	7
Aryan Tsiutryn (BLR)	6
Toshiya Abe (JPN)	2
Süleyman Atlı (TUR)	5

Semifinals
Alireza Sarlak (IRI)	7
Süleyman Atlı (TUR)	4

=== Repechage ===
Repechage round 2
Abubakar Mutaliev (RWF)	13
Vladimir Egorov (MKD)	3
Guesseppe Rea (ECU)	0
Aryan Tsiutryn (BLR)	10

Bronze medals
Abubakar Mutaliev (RWF)	4
Horst Lehr (GER)	6
Aryan Tsiutryn (BLR)	3
Süleyman Atlı (TUR)	1

== Final standing ==
Rank	Athlete
1st place, gold medalist(s)	Thomas Gilman (USA)
2nd place, silver medalist(s)	Alireza Sarlak (IRI)
3rd place, bronze medalist(s)	Horst Lehr (GER)
3rd place, bronze medalist(s)	Aryan Tsiutryn (BLR)
5	Abubakar Mutaliev (RWF)
5	Süleyman Atlı (TUR)
7	Toshiya Abe (JPN)
8	Vladimir Egorov (MKD)
9	Mikyay Naim (BUL)
10	Guesseppe Rea (ECU)
11	Erdenebatyn Bekhbayar (MGL)
12	Afgan Khashalov (AZE)
13	Pankaj Malik (IND)
14	Roberto Alejandro (MEX)
15	Meirambek Kartbay (KAZ)
16	Levan Metreveli (ESP)
17	Darthe Capellan (CAN)
18	Goga Dzigua (GEO)
19	Roman Hutsuliak (UKR)
20	Gamal Al-Sabri (YEM)
21	Simon Wainaina (KEN)
22	Park Chang-jun (KOR)
