= Georgi Vangelov =

Bulgarian freestyle wrestler

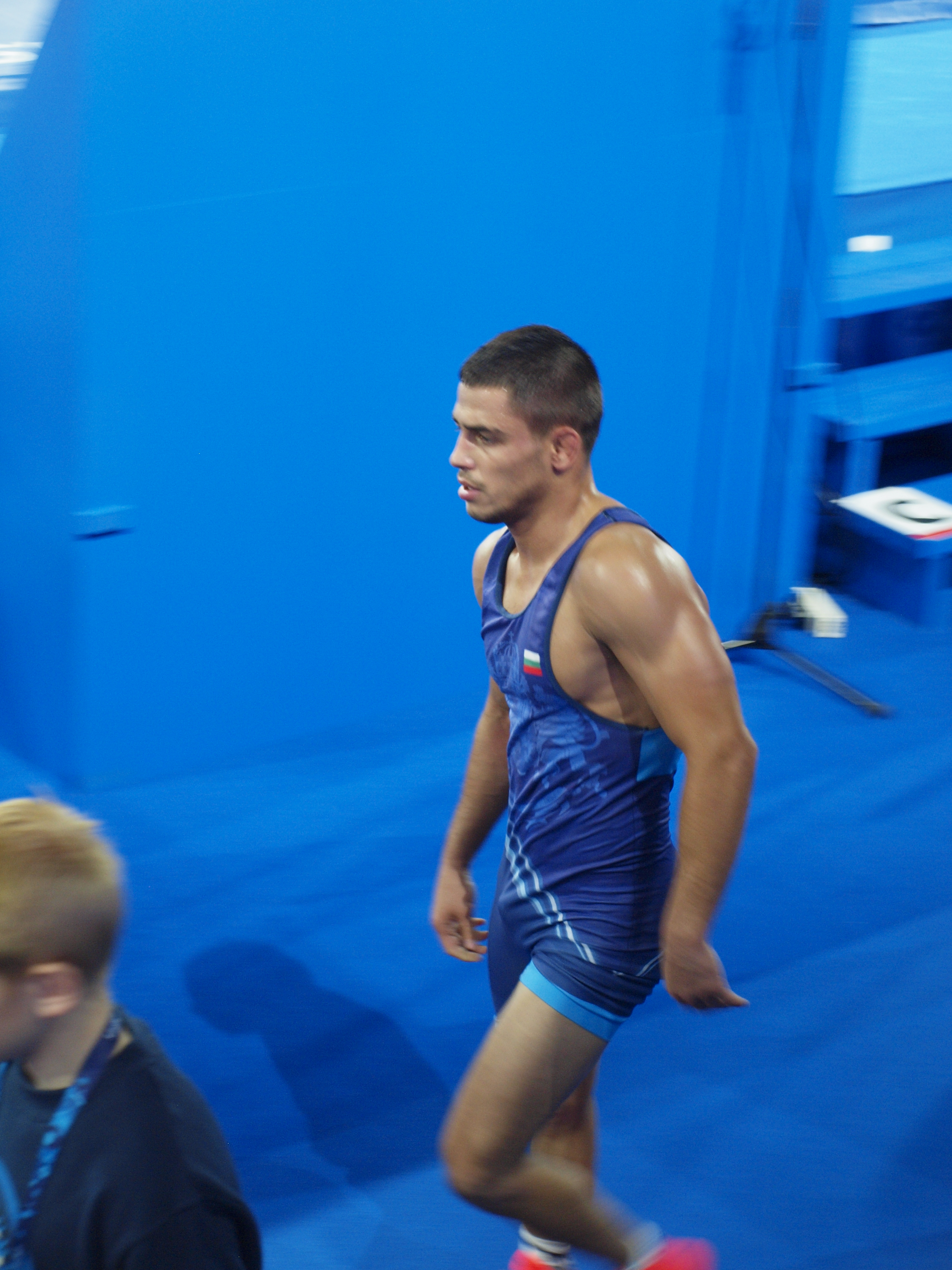

Personal information
- Native name: Георги Валентинов Вангелов
- Full name: Georgi Valentinov Vangelov
- Nationality: Bulgaria
- Born: 29 July 1993 (age 33) Radnevo, Bulgaria
- Height: 165 cm (5 ft 5 in)

Sport
- Country: Bulgaria
- Sport: Amateur wrestling
- Weight class: 61 kg
- Event: Freestyle
- Club: Armeetz-CSKA; Sofia
- Coached by: Rahmat Sofiadi

Achievements and titles
- Olympic finals: 5th (2020)
- World finals: 5th (2022)
- Regional finals: (bronze) (2016) (bronze) (2022) (bronze) (2023)
Medal record
Men's freestyle wrestling
Representing Bulgaria
Individual World Cup
Bronze medal – third place	2020 Belgrade	61 kg
European Championships
Bronze medal – third place	2016 Riga	57 kg
Bronze medal – third place	2022 Budapest	61 kg
Bronze medal – third place	2023 Zagreb	57 kg
Olympic Qualification Tournament
Silver medal – second place	2021 Budapest	57 kg
Grand Prix
Bronze medal – third place	2024 Zagreb	57 kg
Yasar Dogu Tournament
Gold medal – first place	2020 Istanbul	57 kg
Bronze medal – third place	2021 Istanbul	57 kg
Dan Kolov & Nikola Petrov Tournament
Bronze medal – third place	2016 Sofia	57 kg
Bronze medal – third place	2019 Russe	57 kg
Bronze medal – third place	2022 Veliko Tarnovo	61 kg
Bronze medal – third place	2023 Sofia	61 kg
European U23 Championships
Silver medal – second place	2015 Walbrzych	57 kg
World Juniors Championships
Silver medal – second place	2011 Bucharest	50 kg
European Juniors Championships
Bronze medal – third place	2013 Skopje	60 kg
European Cadet Championships
Gold medal – first place	2010 Sarajevo	46 kg
Representing All-World Team
World Cup
Bronze medal – third place	2022 Coralville	Team

Georgi Valentinov Vangelov (Bulgarian: Георги Валентинов Вангелов, born 29 July 1993) is a Bulgarian freestyle wrestler. He is a three-time bronze medalist at the European Wrestling Championships. He also represented Bulgaria at the 2020 Summer Olympics held in Tokyo, Japan.

== Career ==
In 2016, Vangelov won one of the bronze medals in the men's freestyle 57 kg event at the European Wrestling Championships held in Riga, Latvia.

In 2020, Vangelov won one of the bronze medals in the men's 61 kg event at the Individual Wrestling World Cup held in Belgrade, Serbia.

He lost his bronze medal match in the men's 57 kg event at the 2020 Summer Olympics held in Tokyo, Japan.

Vangelov won one of the bronze medals in the men's 61 kg event at the 2022 European Wrestling Championships held in Budapest, Hungary. He lost his bronze medal match in the 61 kg event at the 2022 World Wrestling Championships held in Belgrade, Serbia.

He lost his bronze medal match in the men's 61 kg event at the 2024 European Wrestling Championships held in Bucharest, Romania. He competed at the 2024 European Wrestling Olympic Qualification Tournament in Baku, Azerbaijan hoping to qualify for the 2024 Summer Olympics in Paris, France. He was eliminated in his second match and he did not qualify for the Olympics.

== Personal life ==
Vangelov is married and has a daughter.

== Achievements ==
Year	Tournament	Location	Result	Event
2016	European Championships	Riga, Latvia	3rd	Freestyle 57 kg
2022	European Championships	Budapest, Hungary	3rd	Freestyle 61 kg
2023	European Championships	Zagreb, Croatia	3rd	Freestyle 57 kg
