= Mezhlum Mezhlumyan =

Armenian freestyle wrestler

Personal information
- Native name: Մեժլում Մեժլումյան
- Born: 1 January 2001 (age 25) Yerevan, Armenia
- Height: 1.65 m (5 ft 5 in)
- Weight: 61 kg (134 lb; 9.6 st)

Sport
- Country: Armenia
- Sport: Amateur wrestling
- Weight class: 61 kg
- Event: Freestyle
Medal record
Men's freestyle wrestling
Representing Armenia
European Championships
| Bronze medal – third place | 2024 Bucharest | 61 kg |
World U23 Championships
| Bronze medal – third place | 2023 Tirana | 61 kg |
European U23 Championships
| Silver medal – second place | 2023 Bucharest | 61 kg |

Mezhlum Mezhlumyan (born 2001) is an Armenian freestyle wrestler who currently competes at 61 kilograms

== Career ==
Mezhlumyan won one of the bronze medals in the men's 61 kg event at the 2024 European Wrestling Championships held in Bucharest, Romania. He defeated Niklas Stechele of Germany in his bronze medal match.

== Achievements ==
| Year | Tournament | Location | Result | Event |
|---|---|---|---|---|
| 2024 | European Championships | Bucharest, Romania | 3rd | Freestyle 61 kg |
