= Bundesliga (wrestling) =

Highest German wrestling division

The top division of team wrestling in Germany is the Bundesliga (German: Bundesliga-Ringen). Since 1964, annual championships have been held by Bundesliga-Ringen; although no champion was declared during the COVID-19 pandemic.

Each time a team competes, then a number of the matches will be contested by rules of Greco-Roman wrestling, and the rest of the matches will be fought by the rules of Freestyle wrestling.

The finals are typically held in February and consist of two rounds of matches in various weight classes, held on separate evenings.

For the 2025/26 season, the winner is SV Wacker Burghausen and the runner up is SV Germania Weingarten.

== Teams 2026–27 ==
TOPF A	TOPF B
ASV Urloffen	RG Saarbrücken
RKG Freiburg	Baienfurt-Ravensburg
KSC Germania Hösbach	RKG Reilingen-Hockenheim
AC Lichtenfels	AC Heusweiler
ASV Mainz 88	KSV Witten
SC Siegfried Kleinostheim	RSV Greiz
SV Germania Weingarten	SG Weilimdorf
KSV Köllerbach	ASV Hüttigweiler
SV Wacker Burghausen	KV Riegelsberg
ASV Schorndorf	FC Aue

The Vorrunde consists of 20 teams competing for a slot in the play-offs, which consists of quarter-finals and semi-finals.
