= 2016 European Wrestling Championships – Men's freestyle 57 kg =

The men's freestyle 57 kg is a competition featured at the 2016 European Wrestling Championships, and was held in Riga, Latvia on March 8.

== Medalists ==
Gold	Gadzhimurad Rashidov; Russia
Silver	Andriy Yatsenko; Ukraine
Bronze	Andrei Dukov; Romania
Bronze	Georgi Vangelov; Bulgaria

== Results ==
Legend

- F — Won by fall

=== Final ===
Final
Andriy Yatsenko (UKR)	2
Gadzhimurad Rashidov (RUS)	8

=== Top half ===
==== Section 1 ====
Round of 32

Round of 16
Andriy Yatsenko (UKR)	9
Marcel Ewald (GER)	1
Mahir Amirsalanov (AZE)	11
Eduards Kucepalovs (LAT)	1
Alessandro Canggiano (ITA)	1
Andrei Dukov (ROM)	12
Jozsef Molnar (HUN)	10
Kastriot Sedolli (KOS)	0

Quarterfinals
Andriy Yatsenko (UKR)	9
Mahir Amirsalanov (AZE)	8
Andrei Dukov (ROM)	8
Jozsef Molnar (HUN)	1

Semifinals
Andriy Yatsenko (UKR)	5
Andrei Dukov (ROM)	1

=== Bottom half ===
==== Section 2 ====
Round of 32
Otari Gogava (GEO)	8
Asadulla Lachinau (BLR)	10
Suleyman Atli (TUR)	10
Georgi Vangelov (BUL)	10
Zoheir El Quarraqe (FRA)	13
Tomasz Ogonowski (POL)	4
Levan Metreveli (ESP)	11
Randy Adrian Vock (SUI)	0
Gadzhimurad Rashidov (RUS)	10
Yuriy Holub (ISR)	0

Round of 16
Alexandru Chirtoaca (MDA)	1
Garik Barseghyan (ARM)	12
Aleksei Beskakov (EST)	0
Asadulla Lachinau (BLR)	9
Georgi Vangelov (BUL)	6
Zoheir El Quarraqe (FRA)	5
Levan Metreveli (ESP)	0
Gadzhimurad Rashidov (RUS)	10

Quarterfinals
Garik Barseghyan (ARM)	1
Asadulla Lachinau (BLR)	6
Georgi Vangelov (BUL)	0
Gadzhimurad Rashidov (RUS)	10

Semifinals
Asadulla Lachinau (BLR)	0
Gadzhimurad Rashidov (RUS)	6

=== Repechage ===
Repechage round 1
Yuriy Holub (ISR)	10
Levan Metreveli (ESP)	0

Repechage round 2
Mahir Amirsalanov (AZE)	3
Marcel Ewald (GER)	0
Georgi Vangelov (BUL)	8
Yuriy Holub (ISR)	0

Bronze medals
Andrei Dukov (ROU)	12
Mahir Amirsalanov (AZE)	2
Georgi Vangelov (BUL)	7
Asadulla Lachinau (BLR)	3
