= Alireza Sarlak =

Iranian freestyle wrestler

Personal information
- Native name: علیرضا سرلک
- Full name: Alireza Sarlak
- Nationality: Iran
- Born: 30 April 1997 (age 29) Aligudarz, Iran
- Height: 168 cm (5 ft 6 in)

Sport
- Country: Iran
- Sport: Amateur wrestling
- Weight class: 57 kg
- Event: Freestyle

Achievements and titles
- World finals: (silver) (2021)
- Regional finals: (silver) (2021)
Medal record
Men's freestyle wrestling
Representing Iran
World Championships
Silver medal – second place	2021 Oslo	57 kg
Asian Championships
Silver medal – second place	2021 Almaty	57 kg
World Cup
Silver medal – second place	2019 Yakutsk	57 kg
World U23 Championships
Bronze medal – third place	2019 Budapest	57 kg

Alireza Sarlak (Persian: علیرضا سرلک) is an Iranian freestyle wrestler. He won the silver medal in the men's 57 kg event at the 2021 World Wrestling Championships held in Oslo, Norway.

In 2021, he also won the silver medal in the 57 kg event at the Asian Wrestling Championships held in Almaty, Kazakhstan. He competed in the 57 kg event at the 2022 World Wrestling Championships held in Belgrade, Serbia.
