= 2024 World Wrestling Championships =

Wrestling tournament in Tirana, Albania

- Host city: Tirana, Albania
- Dates: 28–31 October 2024
- Stadium: Tirana Olympic Park

Champions
- Freestyle: Japan
- Greco-Roman: Azerbaijan
- Women: Japan

The 2024 World Wrestling Championships was held from 28 to 31 October 2024 in Tirana, Albania. Athletes who participated in the 2024 Paris Olympic Games would not be allowed to compete.

== Competition schedule ==
All times are (UTC+1:00)

Date	Time	Event
28 October	10.30–14.30	Qualification rounds: GR 55-63-72-82 kg
28 October	17:00–17.45	Semi-finals: GR 55-63-72-82 kg
29 October	10.30–14.30	Qualification rounds: WW 55-59-65-72 kg; Repechage: GR 55-63-72-82 kg
29 October	17:00–17.45	Semi-finals: WW 55-59-65-72 kg
29 October	18.00–21.00	Finals: GR 55-63-72-82 kg
30 October	10.30–15.00	Qualification rounds: FS 61-70-79-92 kg; Repechage: WW 55-59-65-72 kg
30 October	17:00–17.45	Semi-finals: FS 61-70-79-92 kg
30 October	18.00–21.00	Finals: WW 55-59-65-72 kg
31 October	16.30–17.30	Repechage: FS 61-70-79-92 kg
31 October	18:00–20.30	Finals: FS 61-70-79-92 kg

== Medal table ==
Rank	Nation	Gold	Silver	Bronze	Total
1	Japan	4	1	2	7
2	Azerbaijan	3	0	0	3
–	Individual Neutral Athletes	2	0	4	6
3	Iran	1	2	0	3
3	Kazakhstan	1	2	0	3
5	China	1	1	0	2
6	Georgia	0	1	2	3
7	France	0	1	1	2
7	Mongolia	0	1	1	2
7	Romania	0	1	1	2
7	Turkey	0	1	1	2
11	Hungary	0	1	0	1
12	United States	0	0	4	4
13	Slovakia	0	0	2	2
14	Armenia	0	0	1	1
14	Czech Republic	0	0	1	1
14	Germany	0	0	1	1
14	India	0	0	1	1
14	Serbia	0	0	1	1
14	Tajikistan	0	0	1	1
Totals (19 entries)		12	12	24	48

== Team ranking ==
Rank	Men's freestyle		Men's Greco-Roman		Women's freestyle	
Rank	Team	Points	Team	Points	Team	Points
1	Japan	60	Azerbaijan	85	Japan	90
2	Iran	46	Iran	51	China	53
3	United States	36	Armenia	35	United States	40
4	Kazakhstan	33	Georgia	34	Mongolia	34
5	Mongolia	31	Kazakhstan	28	Romania	30
6	Georgia	30	France; Hungary	20	India	29
7	Slovakia	30	France; Hungary	20	Kazakhstan	20
8	Turkey	20	China	20	Ukraine	20
9	Azerbaijan	18	Turkey	17	Czech Republic; France; Germany	15
10	Tajikistan	17	Romania; Serbia	15	Czech Republic; France; Germany	15

== Medal summary ==
=== Men's freestyle ===
Event	Gold	Silver	Bronze
61 kg	Masanosuke Ono; Japan	Ahmet Duman; Turkey	Tseveensürengiin Tsogbadrakh; Mongolia
61 kg	Masanosuke Ono; Japan	Ahmet Duman; Turkey	Vito Arujau; United States
70 kg	Nurkozha Kaipanov; Kazakhstan	Yoshinosuke Aoyagi; Japan	Inalbek Sheriev; Individual Neutral Athletes
70 kg	Nurkozha Kaipanov; Kazakhstan	Yoshinosuke Aoyagi; Japan	Abdulmazhid Kudiev; Tajikistan
79 kg	Magomed Magomaev; Individual Neutral Athletes	Mohammad Nokhodi; Iran	Kota Takahashi; Japan
79 kg	Magomed Magomaev; Individual Neutral Athletes	Mohammad Nokhodi; Iran	Achsarbek Gulajev; Slovakia
92 kg	Abdulrashid Sadulaev; Individual Neutral Athletes	Miriani Maisuradze; Georgia	David Taylor; United States
92 kg	Abdulrashid Sadulaev; Individual Neutral Athletes	Miriani Maisuradze; Georgia	Batyrbek Tsakulov; Slovakia

=== Men's Greco-Roman ===
Event	Gold	Silver	Bronze
55 kg	Eldaniz Azizli; Azerbaijan	Pouya Dadmarz; Iran	Denis Mihai; Romania
55 kg	Eldaniz Azizli; Azerbaijan	Pouya Dadmarz; Iran	Emin Sefershaev; Individual Neutral Athletes
63 kg	Nihat Mammadli; Azerbaijan	Yerzhet Zharlykassyn; Kazakhstan	Karen Aslanyan; Armenia
63 kg	Nihat Mammadli; Azerbaijan	Yerzhet Zharlykassyn; Kazakhstan	Sadyk Lalaev; Individual Neutral Athletes
72 kg	Ulvu Ganizade; Azerbaijan	Ibrahim Ghanem; France	Ali Arsalan; Serbia
72 kg	Ulvu Ganizade; Azerbaijan	Ibrahim Ghanem; France	Otar Abuladze; Georgia
82 kg	Mohammad Ali Geraei; Iran	Erik Szilvássy; Hungary	Ahmet Yılmaz; Turkey
82 kg	Mohammad Ali Geraei; Iran	Erik Szilvássy; Hungary	Gela Bolkvadze; Georgia

=== Women's freestyle ===
Event	Gold	Silver	Bronze
55 kg	Moe Kiyooka; Japan	Zhang Jin; China	Tatiana Debien; France
55 kg	Moe Kiyooka; Japan	Zhang Jin; China	Iryna Kurachkina; Individual Neutral Athletes
59 kg	Risako Kinjo; Japan	Sükheegiin Tserenchimed; Mongolia	Mansi Ahlawat; India
59 kg	Risako Kinjo; Japan	Sükheegiin Tserenchimed; Mongolia	Elena Brugger; Germany
65 kg	Long Jia; China	Kateryna Zelenykh; Romania	Macey Kilty; United States
65 kg	Long Jia; China	Kateryna Zelenykh; Romania	Miwa Morikawa; Japan
72 kg	Ami Ishii; Japan	Zhamila Bakbergenova; Kazakhstan	Adéla Hanzlíčková; Czech Republic
72 kg	Ami Ishii; Japan	Zhamila Bakbergenova; Kazakhstan	Kylie Welker; United States

== Participating nations ==
284 competitors from 48 nations and the Individual Neutral Athletes team participated.

- Albania (9)
- Algeria (1)
- Armenia (8)
- Azerbaijan (10)
- Bahrain (1)
- Brazil (3)
- Bulgaria (7)
- Canada (8)
- China (12)
- Costa Rica (1)
- Croatia (2)
- Czech Republic (1)
- Ecuador (1)
- Finland (2)
- France (7)
- Georgia (8)
- Germany (7)
- Hungary (8)
- India (12)
- Individual Neutral Athletes (22)
- Iran (8)
- Israel (2)
- Italy (4)
- Jamaica (1)
- Japan (12)
- Kazakhstan (12)
- Kosovo (1)
- Kyrgyzstan (7)
- Latvia (4)
- Lithuania (1)
- Mexico (3)
- Moldova (11)
- Mongolia (8)
- North Macedonia (5)
- Norway (1)
- Poland (9)
- Puerto Rico (2)
- Romania (7)
- Saudi Arabia (3)
- Serbia (2)
- Slovakia (2)
- Spain (1)
- Sweden (3)
- Switzerland (4)
- Tajikistan (2)
- Turkey (12)
- Ukraine (12)
- United States (12)
- Uzbekistan (3)
- As a result of sanctions imposed following the 2022 Russian invasion of Ukraine, wrestlers from Russia and Belarus were not permitted to use the name, flag, or anthem of Russia or Belarus. They instead participated as Individual Neutral Athletes (Athlètes Individuels Neutres in French) according to an IOC decision implemented by the UWW. No flags at all were used for these delegations, not even the UWW flag. The UWW does not include the medals won by these wrestlers in the official medal table, their results were not counted in the team rankings.
