= Andriy Yatsenko =

Ukrainian freestyle wrestler (born 1997)

Personal information
- Full name: Andriy Sergeevich Yatsenko
- Nationality: Ukraine
- Born: Андрей Сергеевич Яценко; 14 September 1997 (age 28) Kyiv, Ukraine
- Height: 165 cm (5 ft 5 in)

Sport
- Country: Ukraine
- Sport: Wrestling
- Weight class: 57 kg
- Event: Freestyle

Achievements and titles
- World finals: (bronze) (2017)
- Regional finals: (silver) (2016)
Medal record
Men's freestyle wrestling
Representing Ukraine
World Championships
Bronze medal – third place	2017 Paris	57 kg
Individual World Cup
Bronze medal – third place	2020 Belgrade	57 kg
European Championships
Silver medal – second place	2016 Riga	57 kg
Waclaw Ziolkowski Memorial
Silver medal – second place	2022 Warsaw	57 kg
Ibrahim Moustafa Tournament
Silver medal – second place	2023 Alexandria	57 kg
European U23 Championships
Gold medal – first place	2019 Novi Sad	57 kg
Bronze medal – third place	2017 Szombathely	57 kg
World Cadets Championships
Gold medal – first place	2014 Snina	54 kg
Gold medal – first place	2013 Zrenjanin	54 kg

Andriy Yatsenko (born 14 September 1997) is a Ukrainian male freestyle wrestler. He won a silver medal in the 2016 European Wrestling Championships which was his first international senior success.

The next success was the victory in XXI Outstanding Ukrainian Wrestlers and Coaches Memorial and bronze medal in U23 Senior European Championships.

2017 World Championship Bronze medalist.

2018 Was signed by Mumbai Maharathi team to the Pro Wrestling League - Season 3.

In March 2021, he competed at the European Qualification Tournament in Budapest, Hungary hoping to qualify for the 2020 Summer Olympics in Tokyo, Japan.

Yatsenko pinned Spencer Lee at RAF 03 on November 25, 2025.
