= Horst Lehr =

German freestyle wrestler

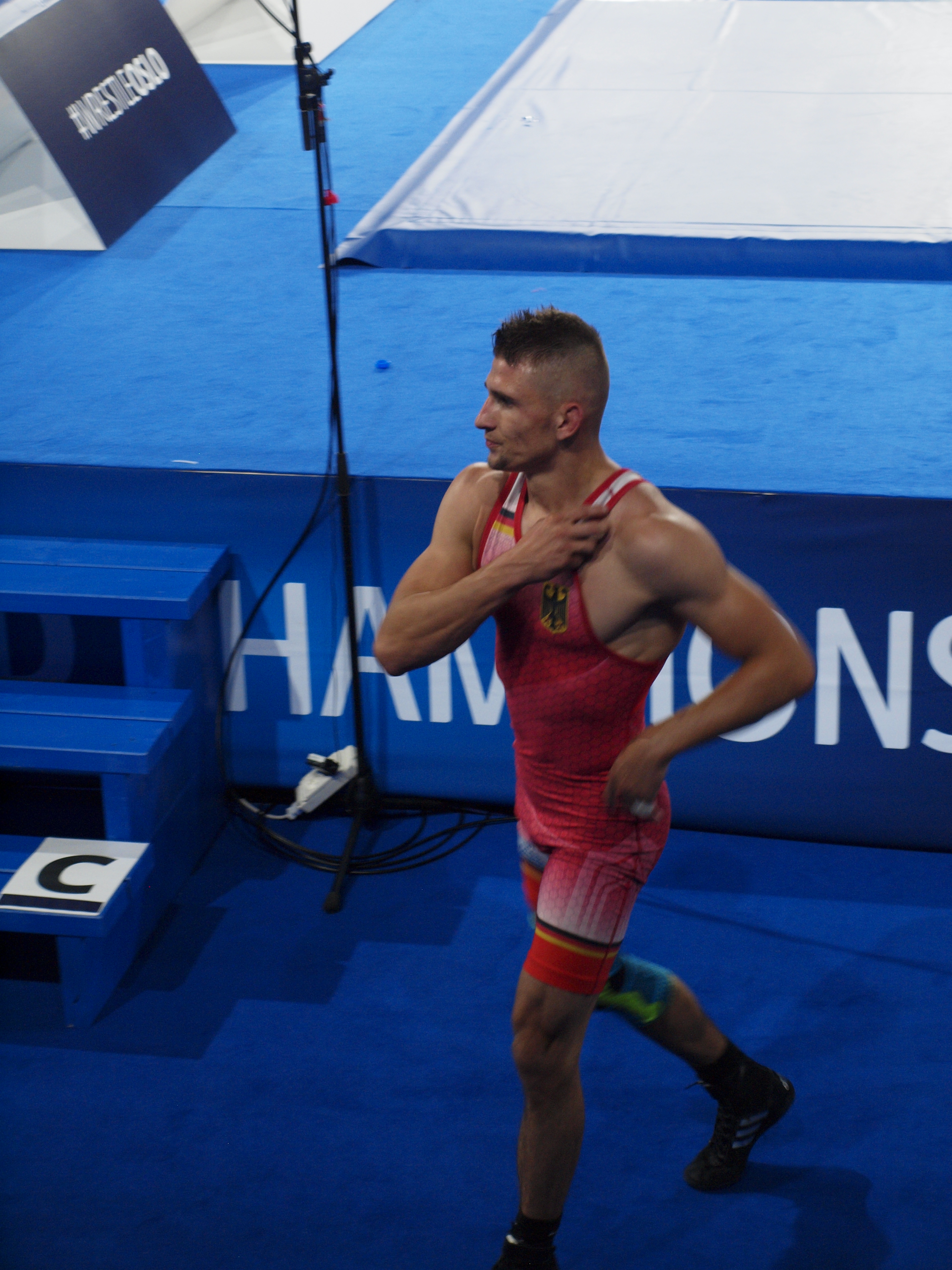
- Horst Lehr at the 2021 World Wrestling Championships in Oslo, Norway

Personal information
- Full name: Horst Justin Junior Lehr
- Nationality: Germany
- Born: 6 December 1999 (age 26) Ludwigshafen am Rhein, Germany
- Home town: Ludwigshafen am Rhein
- Height: 165 cm (5 ft 5 in)

Sport
- Country: Germany
- Sport: Amateur wrestling
- Weight class: 57 kg
- Event: Freestyle
- Club: KSV Köllerbach
Medal record
Men's freestyle wrestling
Representing Germany
World Championships
| Bronze medal – third place | 2021 Oslo | 57 kg |
European Championships
| Bronze medal – third place | 2020 Rome | 57 kg |
| Bronze medal – third place | 2023 Zagreb | 57 kg |
Military World Games
| Bronze medal – third place | 2019 Wuhan | 57 kg |
Yasar Dogu Tournament
| Silver medal – second place | 2023 Istanbul | 57 kg |
Matteo Pellicone Tournament
| Silver medal – second place | 2022 Rome | 57 kg |
European U23 Championships
| Gold medal – first place | 2022 Plovdiv | 57 kg |
European Juniors Championships
| Bronze medal – third place | 2017 Dortmund | 50 kg |

Horst Justin Junior Lehr (born 6 December 1999, Ludwigshafen am Rhein) is a German freestyle wrestler. He is a bronze medalist in the men's 57 kg event at the 2021 World Wrestling Championships held in Oslo, Norway. He is also a two-time bronze medalist in this event at the European Wrestling Championships.

== Career ==
Lehr competed in the 57 kg event at the 2019 World Wrestling Championships held in Nur-Sultan, Kazakhstan without winning a medal. He was eliminated in his second match by Nurislam Sanayev of Kazakhstan. Later that year, Lehr represented Germany at the 2019 Military World Games held in Wuhan, China and he won one of the bronze medals in the 57 kg event.

In 2020, Lehr won one of the bronze medals in the 57 kg event at the European Wrestling Championships held in Rome, Italy. In 2021, he won one of the bronze medals in the 57 kg event at the World Wrestling Championships held in Oslo, Norway.

Lehr won the gold medal in his event at the 2022 European U23 Wrestling Championship held in Plovdiv, Bulgaria. A few months later, he won the silver medal in his event at the Matteo Pellicone Ranking Series 2022 held in Rome, Italy. Lehr competed in the 57 kg event at the 2022 World Wrestling Championships held in Belgrade, Serbia where he was eliminated in his first match.

Lehr competed at the 2024 European Wrestling Olympic Qualification Tournament in Baku, Azerbaijan hoping to qualify for the 2024 Summer Olympics in Paris, France. He was eliminated in his first match and he did not qualify for the Olympics. Lehr also competed at the 2024 World Wrestling Olympic Qualification Tournament held in Istanbul, Turkey without qualifying for the Olympics.

== Achievements ==
| Year | Tournament | Location | Result | Event |
|---|---|---|---|---|
| 2019 | Military World Games | Wuhan, China | 3rd | Freestyle 57 kg |
| 2020 | European Championships | Rome, Italy | 3rd | Freestyle 57 kg |
| 2021 | World Championships | Oslo, Norway | 3rd | Freestyle 57 kg |
| 2023 | European Championships | Zagreb, Croatia | 3rd | Freestyle 57 kg |
