= Nuraddin Novruzov =

Azerbaijani freestyle wrestler

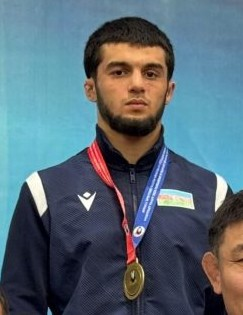

Personal information
- Native name: Nürəddin Novruzov
- Nationality: Azerbaijan
- Born: 1 January 2003 (age 23) Ganja, Azerbaijan
- Height: 1.68 m (5 ft 6 in)

Sport
- Country: Azerbaijan
- Sport: Amateur wrestling
- Weight class: 61 kg
- Event: Freestyle

Achievements and titles
- World finals: 5th (2024)
- Regional finals: (bronze) (2024)
Medal record
Men's freestyle wrestling
Representing Azerbaijan
World Championships
Bronze medal – third place	2025 Zagreb	61 kg
European Championships
Bronze medal – third place	2024 Bucharest	61 kg
Grand Prix
Bronze medal – third place	2024 Zagreb	61 kg
Bronze medal – third place	2025 Zagreb	61 kg
European U23 Championships
Bronze medal – third place	2024 Baku	61 kg

Nuraddin Novruzov (born 2003) is an Azerbaijani freestyle wrestler who currently competes at 61 kilograms

== Career ==
Novruzov won one of the bronze medals in the men's 61 kg event at the 2024 European Wrestling Championships held in Bucharest, Romania. He defeated Georgi Vangelov of Bulgaria in his bronze medal match. He also won one of the bronze medals in the 61 kg event at the 2024 European U23 Wrestling Championships held in Baku, Azerbaijan.

== Achievements ==
Year	Tournament	Location	Result	Event
2024	European Championships	Bucharest, Romania	3rd	Freestyle 61 kg
2025	World Championships	Zagreb, Croatia	3rd	Freestyle 61 kg
