= Ahmet Duman =

Turkish freestyle wrestler

Sport
- Country: Turkey
- Sport: Amateur wrestling
- Weight class: 57 kg
- Event: Freestyle
Medal record
Men's freestyle wrestling
Representing Turkey
World Championships
| Silver medal – second place | 2024 Tirana | 61 kg |
Mediterranean Games
| Gold medal – first place | 2026 Taranto | 65 kg |

Ahmet Duman is a Turkish freestyle wrestler competing in the 57 kg division.

== Career ==
In 2019, he won the silver medal in the men's 57 kg event at the 2019 European Juniors Wrestling Championships held in Pontevedra, Spain.
