= Zelimkhan Abakarov =

Russian-Albanian wrestler (born 1993)

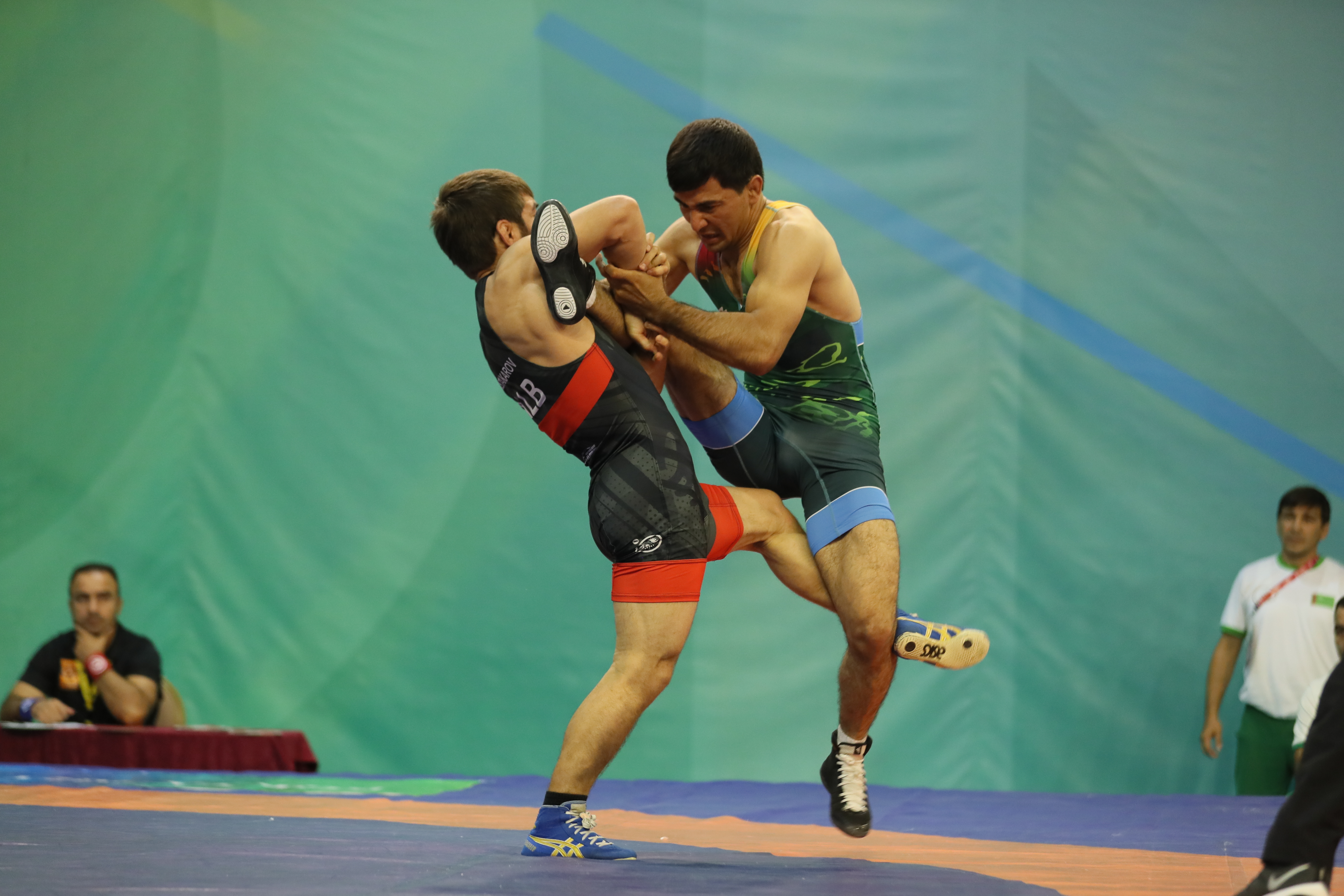
- Abakarov (left) in 2021

Personal information
- Full name: Zelimkhan Arsenovich Abakarov
- Born: Зелимхан Арсенович Абакаров; 14 July 1993 (age 33) Khasavyurt, Dagestan, Russia
- Height: 162 cm (5 ft 4 in)

Sport
- Country: Russia (2013–2020); Albania (2022–present)
- Sport: Amateur wrestling
- Weight class: 65 kg
- Event: Freestyle
- Club: Umakhanov WC (им. Умаханова)
- Coached by: Magomed Guseinov

Achievements and titles
- World finals: (gold) (2022) (bronze) (2023)
- Regional finals: (silver) (2023)
Medal record
Men's freestyle wrestling
Representing Albania
World Championships
Gold medal – first place	2022 Belgrade	57 kg
Bronze medal – third place	2023 Belgrade	57 kg
European Championships
Silver medal – second place	2023 Zagreb	61 kg
Silver medal – second place	2024 Bucharest	61 kg
Silver medal – second place	2026 Tirana	61 kg
Bronze medal – third place	2025 Bratislava	61 kg
Mediterranean Games
Gold medal – first place	2022 Oran	65 kg
Silver medal – second place	2026 Taranto	65 kg
World Cup
Gold medal – first place	2019 Yakutsk	61 kg
Islamic Solidarity Games
Silver medal – second place	2021 Konya	65 kg
Golden Grand Prix Ivan Yarygin
Bronze medal – third place	2022 Krasnoyarsk	61 kg
Dan Kolov & Nikola Petrov Tournament
Gold medal – first place	2022 Veliko Tarnovo	61 kg
Grand Prix
Gold medal – first place	2022 Tirana	65 kg
Gold medal – first place	2023 Tirana	61 kg
Gold medal – first place	2023 Budapest	61 kg
Silver medal – second place	2025 Nice	65 kg
Bronze medal – third place	2026 Tirana	61 kg
Representing Russia
Dan Kolov & Nikola Petrov Tournament
Bronze medal – third place	2017 Russe	61 kg
Ali Aliyev Tournament
Gold medal – first place	2019 Kaspisk	61 kg
Silver medal – second place	2018 Kaspisk	61 kg
Alany Tournament
Silver medal – second place	2017 Vladikavkas	61 kg
Bronze medal – third place	2019 Vladikavkas	61 kg
Representing All-World Team
World Cup
Bronze medal – third place	2022 Coralville	Team
Representing Dagestan
Russian Championships
Bronze medal – third place	2019 Sochi	61 kg
Bronze medal – third place	2018 Odintsovo	61 kg
Golden Grand Prix Ivan Yarygin
Bronze medal – third place	2017 Krasnoyarsk	57 kg

Zelimkhan Arsenovich Abakarov (Russian: Зелимхан Арсенович Абакаров; born 14 July 1993) is a Russian-born Albanian wrestler. He is a gold medalist at the 2022 World Wrestling Championships. He is the first wrestler representing Albania to win a gold medal at the World Wrestling Championships. He is also a gold medalist at the 2022 Mediterranean Games and a silver medalist at the 2021 Islamic Solidarity Games.

== Career ==
Abakarov won one of the bronze medals in his event at the Golden Grand Prix Ivan Yarygin 2022 held in Krasnoyarsk, Russia. He competed in the men's freestyle 61 kg and men's Greco-Roman 67 kg events at the 2022 European Wrestling Championships held in Budapest, Hungary.

Abakarov won the gold medal in the men's freestyle 65 kg event at the 2022 Mediterranean Games held in Oran, Algeria. He won the silver medal in his event at the 2021 Islamic Solidarity Games held in Konya, Turkey. He won the gold medal in the men's 57 kg event at the 2022 World Wrestling Championships held in Belgrade, Serbia.

Abakarov won the silver medal at the 2023 European Wrestling Championships in Zagreb, Croatia, losing 5–2 to Armenian Arsen Harutyunyan in the men's freestyle 61 kg final match. He beat German Niklas Stechele with a 10-0 technical superiority in the first round, Ukrainian Taras Markovych 6–2 in the quarterfinals and Georgian Shota Phartenadze 4–4 in the semifinals and reached the final with the advantage of the last point.

He won the silver medal in the men's 61 kg event at the 2024 European Wrestling Championships held in Bucharest, Romania. He competed in the men's freestyle 57 kg event at the 2024 Summer Olympics in Paris, France.

== Achievements ==
Year	Tournament	Location	Result	Event
2022	Mediterranean Games	Oran, Algeria	1st	Freestyle 65 kg
2022	Islamic Solidarity Games	Konya, Turkey	2nd	Freestyle 65 kg
2022	World Championships	Belgrade, Serbia	1st	Freestyle 57 kg
2023	European Championships	Zagreb, Croatia	2nd	Freestyle 61 kg
2023	World Championships	Belgrade, Serbia	3rd	Freestyle 57 kg
2024	European Championships	Bucharest, Romania	2nd	Freestyle 61 kg
2025	European Championships	Bratislava, Slovakia	3rd	Freestyle 61 kg

Olympic Games
Preceded by Denni Xhepa	Flagbearer for Albania; Paris 2024 with Kaltra Meca	Succeeded by Lara Colturi; Denni Xhepa
