= Zaur Uguev =

Russian freestyle wrestler

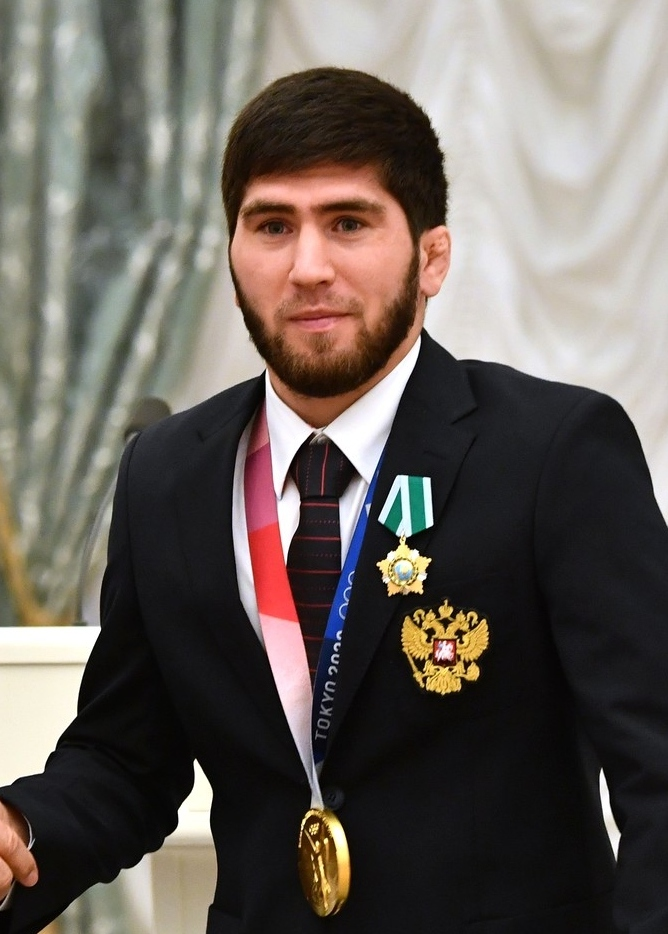
- Uguev in 2021

Personal information
- Native name: Заур Ризванович Угуев
- Full name: Zaur Rizvanovich Uguev
- Nationality: Russia
- Born: 27 March 1995 (age 31) Khasavyurt, Khasavyurtovsky District, Dagestan, Russia
- Height: 1.57 m (5 ft 2 in)

Sport
- Country: Russia
- Sport: Wrestling
- Weight class: 57 kg
- Rank: Grand Master of Sport in Freestyle Wrestling
- Event: Freestyle
- Club: Wrestling Academy of Mavlet Batirov
- Coached by: Shem Shemeev

Achievements and titles
- Olympic finals: (gold) (2020)
- World finals: (gold) (2018) (gold) (2019) (gold) (2025)
- Regional finals: (gold) (2025) (silver) (2018) (bronze) (2017)
Medal record
Men's freestyle wrestling
Representing Russia, ROC and Individual Neutral Athletes
Olympic Games
Gold medal – first place	2020 Tokyo	57 kg
World Championships
Gold medal – first place	2018 Budapest	57 kg
Gold medal – first place	2019 Nur-Sultan	57 kg
Gold medal – first place	2025 Zagreb	61 kg
Silver medal – second place	2026 Astana	61 kg
European Championships
Gold medal – first place	2025 Bratislava	61 kg
Gold medal – first place	2026 Tirana	61 kg
Silver medal – second place	2018 Kaspiysk	57 kg
Bronze medal – third place	2017 Novi Sad	57 kg
Grand Prix
Gold medal – first place	2026 Tirana	61 kg
European Games
Bronze medal – third place	2019 Minsk	57 kg
Individual World Cup
Gold medal – first place	2020 Belgrade	57 kg
Yasar Dogu Tournament
Bronze medal – third place	2017 Istanbul	57 kg
Dan Kolov & Nikola Petrov Tournament
Gold medal – first place	2018 Sofia	57 kg
Grand Prix
Gold medal – first place	2016 Khasavyurt	57 kg
Gold medal – first place	2017 Khasavyurt	57 kg
Gold medal – first place	2017 Taraz	57 kg
Gold medal – first place	2021 Sassari	61 kg
Silver medal – second place	2017 Vladikavkaz	57 kg
Bronze medal – third place	2016 Taraz	57 kg
World Cadets Championships
Gold medal – first place	2011 Szombathely	42 kg
Gold medal – first place	2012 Baku	46 kg
Representing Dagestan
Russian Championships
Gold medal – first place	2017 Nazran	57 kg
Gold medal – first place	2018 Odintsovo	57 kg
Gold medal – first place	2020 Naro-Fominsk	57 kg
Gold medal – first place	2021 Ulan-Ude	57 kg
Gold medal – first place	2022 Kyzyl	57 kg
Gold medal – first place	2023 Kaspiysk	57 kg
Gold medal – first place	2024 Novoivanovskoye	61 kg
Golden Grand Prix Ivan Yarygin
Gold medal – first place	2017 Krasnoyarsk	57 kg
Gold medal – first place	2018 Krasnoyarsk	57 kg
Gold medal – first place	2023 Krasnoyarsk	57 kg
Gold medal – first place	2024 Krasnoyarsk	57 kg
Gold medal – first place	2025 Krasnoyarsk	57 kg
Ali Aliyev Memorial
Gold medal – first place	2019 Kaspiysk	57 kg

Zaur Rizvanovich Uguev (Russian: Заур Ризванович Угуев, IPA: [zɐˈur ʊˈɡu(ɪ̯)ɪf]; born 27 March 1995) is a Russian freestyle wrestler who competes at 57 kilograms and 61 kilograms. He claimed the 2020 Summer Olympic Games gold medal after back-to-back World Championships in 2018 and 2019, as well as a 2020 Individual World Cup title. A four-time Russian national champion, Uguev also claimed the gold medal at the 2025 European Championships.

== Biography ==
Originally from the village of Chagarotar (Khasavyurt district), Uguev is of Kumyk ethnicity. He has been of the Russian freestyle wrestling team since 2016. He has trained under the guidance of Sheme Shemeev.

Uguev supported the Russian invasion of Ukraine by participating in a pro-war rally in Luzhniki Stadium in March 2022.

== Career ==
=== 2017 Ivan Yarygin ===
To kick off his 2017 run, Uguev would wrestle at the prestigious event: Ivan Yarygin 2017, held every year, in Krasnoyarsk. Uguev would ultimately reign successful and win gold, facing off against foes: Magomedrasul Idrisov, Nurtilek Ermekbaev, Aryan Tyutrin and Nariman Israpilov, scheduling a final match against Artem Gebekov – also from Dagestan. Moreover, Uguev would win by technical-superiority 10-0 and claim his first Yarygin title, as well as a spot on the Russian team heading to the European Championships in Serbia.

Having been successful for the team selection, Uguev wrestled at the 2017 European Wrestling Championships, held in Novi Sad. Uguev would defeat Vladimir Egorov by the score 5–3, and Andriy Yatsenko by fall, before falling to Giorgi Edisherashvili, representing Azerbaijan by 5–1. However, since having lost in the semi-final, Uguev was given an automatic shot for a chance at one of the bronze medals, which he was successful in taking - defeating Zoheir El-Quarraque by the score 9–1, and his first European Championship medal.

=== Russian Nationals 2017 ===
Uguev had his first senior level National Championship in 2017, in Nazran, Ingushetia. Uguev defeated all five of his opponents; in round of 32 he defeated Ramazan Ferzaliev of Dagestan by technical fall with the score 14–4; in the round of 16 he beat Aryan Tyutrin of Yakutia with a 3–0 score; in the quarterfinals Uguev beat Rasul Mashezov of Crimea by 10-0 technical fall; in the semifinals he beat Dmitry Aksenov of Yakutia by 7–1. In the final match, he defeated former opponent Artem Grebekov by a score of 3–1, which gave him the opportunity to compete at the 2017 Paris World Championships.

=== 2017 World Wrestling Championships ===
Despite his youth, relative inexperience and golds at senior level tournaments, Uguev won his spot for the 2017 Edition of the World Championships, where he would get upset by Sandeep Tomar of India, by the score 8–2, eliminating Uguev from the tournament.

=== 2018 Ivan Yarygin ===
In a repeat of the previous year, Uguev would start his 2018 at the Ivan Yarygin Grand Prix. Uguev beat Mongolia's Tumentsogt Bold, Yakutian Donduk-ool Kuresh-ool and American representative, Frank Perrelli, which would give him way into the finals, opposing stand-out Ossetian, Azamat Tuskaev. Having lost to Tuskaev in the past, Uguev was able to win by the score of 4–1, thus taking first place and the gold medal. With his second Yarygin title, Uguev was again given the opportunity to compete at the 2018 European Championships; although, this time he would face a lot of pressure in his home republic, taking place in Kaspiysk, Dagestan, Russia.

=== European Championships 2018 ===
At the 2018 European Wrestling Championships, Uguev won his matches in the qualification, quarter-final and semi-final rounds. In the final match, he wrestled against Giorgi Edisherashvili of Azerbaijan in a rematch of the 2017 Novi Sad European Championships. Uguev was winning the majority of the match and was up 3-0 going into the final segments of the match; however, with 8 seconds left: Edisherashvili hit a lateral drop and scored 4 points - which gave Edisherashvili the lead with the score of 3–4; Uguev and his team challenged the call and lost it, the match ended with the score 3–5, ultimately winning gold, and Uguev was left with the silver medal,

=== Russian Nationals 2018 ===
Uguev became the Russian national champion at 57 kg for a second time in August 2018, in Odintsovo, Moscow Oblast. Uguev beat Muslim Sadulaev of Chechnya by technical fall in the qualification round, he then beat Rasul Masheshov representing Crimea in the quarter-finals, again by technical fall. In the semi-finals, Uguev beat Ismail Gadzhiev, also representing Dagestan by 3–0, thus advancing Uguev to the final match for a chance to win gold. Uguev faced Dondook-ul Kuresh-ul of Tuva by 8–1 score, Uguev scored a 4-point suplex in the second period, giving him the 7–1 lead and Kuresh-ool's coaches challenged a call, but failed, thus giving Uguev an extra point and won the match by 8-1 and becoming a two-time Russian National champion.

=== 2018 World Wrestling Championships ===
With Uguev's first-place victory at Odintsovo 2018, he qualified for the 2018 World Wrestling Championships held in Budapest, Hungary. In the round of 16, Uguev faced 2012 Olympian, Armenia's Mihran Jaburyan and won by technical superiority 10–0. In the quarter-final Uguev then faced 2017 U23 Senior World Champion, Reineri Andreu Ortega of Cuba, winning by the score of 6–0, and faced Paris 2017 Senior World Champion, Yuki Takahashi of Japan, whom Uguev defeated by the score 7-2 and advanced Uguev to the finals. In the final, Uguev faced Bishkek 2018 champion, Kazakhstan's Nurislam Sanayev. After a close first period with each wrestler scoring a takedown; the second period started out with each wrestler also gaining a step-out point for the score of 3-3; however, Sanayev was penalized for continuously pulling on Uguev's singlet, thus resulting in a score of 4–3 in favor of Uguev, ultimately giving Uguev his first senior world title at 57 kg,

=== 2019 European Games ===
Despite missing the 2019 edition of the Ivan Yarygin Golden Gran Prix, it was decided that Uguev would be the representative to participate in the 57 kg category at the 2019 European Games, held in Minsk, Belarus. After winning the first two matches by technical-superiority, Uguev would suffer an upset loss against Azerbaijani representative Mahir Amiraslanov, by the score 3–2. Despite losing, Uguev would dominate the bronze medal match and win 10–2 over Georgi Vangelov of Bulgaria.

In spite of Uguev's absence at the 2019 Russian National Championships, he would face Aryan Tyutrin for the spot to be able to compete at the World Championships, in Kazakhstan. Uguev would defeat Tyutrin by 10-0 technical-superiority.

=== 2019 World Wrestling Championships ===
Having won Bronze at the European Games, and beating Tyutrin by technical fall at the summer-camp face-offs, the reigning World Champion, Uguev, was once again eligible to take part in the World Championships in Kazakhstan. In the round of 32, Uguev was first faced with the opponent who beat him at the European Games - who became the European Games Champion, Mahir Amiraslanov; Uguev defeated Amiraslanov by the score of 4-3 after scoring a takedown in the last 30 seconds; Uguev next faced Mongolian wrestler, Erdenebatyn Bekhbayar, and defeated him by the score of 5–2. In the quarter-finals, Uguev's opponent was Asian Champion, Reza Atri who was defeated by Uguev with a score of 2–0, advancing Uguev to the semi-finals against Ravi Kumar of India. Kumar was defeated after getting taken down and hit with a four-point fireman's carry, Uguev would hold on to win with a score of 6–4, advancing Uguev onto the final vs. Turkish wrestler and 2019 European Champion, Süleyman Atlı. Up by a passivity point, going into the second period, Uguev would get exposed by Atlı for two-points from a chest-wrap, Uguev himself would force Atlı's back to the mat, leading 3–2, Atlı was able to reverse position and lead the score of 3*-3 by criteria. Approximately 10 seconds later after the reset, Uguev would achieve a strong underhook and was able to land a single-leg takedown for two-points going up 5–3; however, Uguev would then score six-points from three gut-wrenches for a score of 11–3. To finish the match, Uguev would get two-points from a trapped-arm turn for exposure, resulting in a dominating 13-3 technical fall - successfully defending his world title.

=== 2020 Russian National Championships ===
Given the ongoing pandemic due to Sars-Covid, the overwhelming majority of all sporting events were cancelled worldwide, thus cancelling most wrestling tournaments for that year - including the 2020 Tokyo Olympics. Despite all of this, the 2020 Russian National Freestyle Wrestling Championships took place in mid-October, as qualification for the Individual World Cup which was announced to take place in December. Uguev would win three of his matches, all by technical-superiority; defeating Yakutia's Petr Konstantinov and Aleksey Kopylov, then Muslim Sadulaev- which would give him a spot in the final. Uguev would again meet his rival, Azamat Tuskaev opposing him in the final. Uguev's positioning proved to be too much, giving Uguev his third Russian National title defeating Tuskaev by 1-1 criteria, and a spot on the team heading to the Individual World Cup.

=== Individual World Cup ===
For the fact that there was no formal World Championships in 2020 due to covid, a condensed version was introduced as an alternative tournament: the 2020 Individual World Cup. Uguev was sent here, and proved to everyone that he was #1 in the World at 57 kg, and would go unscored on. Uguev first stormed through Moldova's Buruian, and Andreyeu of Belarus, before winning 9–0 over Myrzanazar Uluu from Kyrgyzstan, paving his way into the semi-final match. In his semi-final, he was met with young Iranian, former two-time Cadet World Champion, and 2021 Junior World Champion, Rahman Amouzad, Uguev would waste no time and won by fall, which would then allow Uguev to wrestle in the final. Opposing Uguev in the final, was 2021 Olympian, 2019 European Champion, and World Bronze medalist, Arsen Harutyunyan, of Armenia. Despite Harutyunyan's accomplishments, Uguev would dominate and win by technical-superiority in less than a minute; scoring an ankle-pick to gut-wrench, followed by a single-leg to another two gut-wrenches, making the score 10–0. Uguev ultimately won gold and first place on the podium without conceding a single point.

=== 2021 Russian National Championships ===
Since the Tokyo Olympics were postponed in 2020, they were later rescheduled for the Summer of 2021- this meant that the 2021 Russian Nationals would be the final part of the Olympic Team's selection process - where a gold medal would guarantee a spot on the Olympic team. The favorite at 57 kg was two-time World Champion, Zaur Uguev. To start his run, Uguev would win by technical superiority over his first two opponents: Umar Khachukaev or the Rostov Oblast, and Abubakar Mutaliev of Dagestan- both by the score: 10–0. In the quarter-final, Uguev would face the first of three Tuvan opponents: Donduk-ool Khuresh-ool, who would fall by the score of 2–1; Belek-ool Kuzhuget by 4–1, which would result in Uguev meeting Nachyn Mongush in the final. The final between Uguev and Mongush would be an exhilarating and exciting match, with both wrestlers scoring: Uguev would score first due to Mongush's inactivity and then a push-out, shortly after a takedown was scored for Uguev- giving him the lead 4–0 at the break. Around a minute and a half through the second period, Mongush threw Uguev to his back for four points, evening the score: 4-4; although, Uguev would later throw Mongush for five-points, gaining the lead by the score 9–4. Mongush would shortly after make Uguev step-out, resulting in a 9–5 score; however, it would be too late as Uguev was able to hold the score until the final whistle and conclusion of the match. Having beat Mongush, Uguev became the 2021 Russian National Champion, he would be one of three wrestlers from Dagestan to claim the honour, and became the 57 kg representative of the Russian Freestyle team at the 2021 Olympics, where he won the gold medal.

=== 2025 ===
At the 2025 World Wrestling Championships in Zagreb, Croatia, Tokyo Olympic champion Zavur Uguev won his third world title and first at 61 kg. On 14 September 2025, Uguev defeated Iran's Ahmad Javan 11-2 in the final to claim gold in the men's freestyle 61 kg category. During this competition, Zavur also defeated Jax Forrest.

=== 2026 ===
On April 26, 2026, Zavur defeated Zelimkhan Abakarov of Albania 4-0 in the final to win his second consecutive European Championship title at 61 kg in Tirana, Albania. Uguev, a three-time world champion and 2020 Olympic gold medalist at 57 kg, delivered a technical superiority in the final, scoring via activity clock, stepout, and takedown while showcasing strong defense and positioning. He had earlier pinned Arsen Harutyunyan in the semifinals. In the semifinals, he came from behind to pin four-time European champion Arsen Harutyunyan of Armenia. In the final, Uguev defeated home favorite and former world champion Zelimkhan Abakarov of Albania 4-0 with an activity point, a step-out, and a takedown.

== Freestyle record ==
International Freestyle Matches
Res.	Record	Opponent	Score	Date	Event	Location
2026 European Wrestling Championships (gold) at 61 kg
Win	97-11	(Albania) Zelimkhan Abakarov	4–0	26 April 2026	2026 European Wrestling Championships	Tirana, Albania
Win	96-11	(Armenia) Arsen Harutyunyan	Fall	26 April 2026	2026 European Wrestling Championships	Tirana, Albania
Win	95-11	(Belarus) Dzmitry Shamela	11–2	25 April 2026	2026 European Wrestling Championships	Tirana, Albania
2026 Muhamet Malo Ranking Series (gold) at 61 kg
Win	94-11	(Russia) Chermen Tavitov	5–2	March 2026	2026 Muhamet Malo Ranking Series	Tirana, Albania
Win	93-11	(United States) Austin Desanto	5–0	March 2026	2026 Muhamet Malo Ranking Series	Tirana, Albania
Win	92-11	(United States) Nathan Tomasello	7-1	March 2026	2026 Muhamet Malo Ranking Series	Tirana, Albania
Win	91-11	(Italy) Simone Piroddu	TF 10-0	March 2026	2026 Muhamet Malo Ranking Series	Tirana, Albania
2025 World Wrestling Championships (gold) at 61 kg
Win	90-11	(Iran) Ahmad Javan	11-2	14 September 2025	2025 World Wrestling Championships	Zagreb, Croatia
Win	89-11	(United States) Jax Forrest	10–3	13 September 2025	2025 World Wrestling Championships	Zagreb, Croatia
Win	88-11	(Kazakhstan) Assylzhan Yessengeldi	TF 13-2	13 September 2025	2025 World Wrestling Championships	Zagreb, Croatia
Win	87-11	(Armenia) Manvel Khndzrtsyan	TF 11–0	13 September 2025	2025 World Wrestling Championships	Zagreb, Croatia
2025 European Wrestling Championships (gold) at 61 kg
Win	86-11	(Armenia) Arsen Harutyunyan	7-5	26 April 2026	2025 European Wrestling Championships	(Slovenia) Bratislava Slovakia
2024 World Wrestling Championships at 61 kg
Loss	85-11	(United States) Vito Arujau	3–8	31 October 2024	2024 World Wrestling Championships	Tirana, Albania
Win	85-10	(France) Arman Eloyan	TF 10–0	31 October 2024	2024 World Wrestling Championships	Tirana, Albania
Win	84-10	(China) Li Weiyu	TF 12-0	31 October 2024	2024 World Wrestling Championships	Tirana, Albania
Loss	83-10	(Japan) Masanosuke Ono	2-10	30 October 2024	2024 World Wrestling Championships	Tirana, Albania
2020 Summer Olympics (gold) at 57 kg
Win	83–9	(India) Ravi Kumar Dahiya	7–4	4 August–5, 2021	2020 Summer Olympics	Tokyo, Japan
Win	82–9	(Iran) Reza Atri	8–3	4 August–5, 2021	2020 Summer Olympics	Tokyo, Japan
Win	81–9	(Uzbekistan) Gulomjon Abdullaev	6–6	4 August–5, 2021	2020 Summer Olympics	Tokyo, Japan
Win	80–9	(United States) Thomas Gilman	5–4	4 August–5, 2021	2020 Summer Olympics	Tokyo, Japan
2021 Sassari City International (gold) at 61 kg
Win	79–9	(Spain) David Gonzalez	TF	19 June 2021	2021 Sassari City International	Sassari, Italy
2021 Russian Nationals (gold) at 57 kg
Win	78–9	(Tuva) Nachyn Mongush	9–5	11 March–12, 2021	2021 Russian National Freestyle Wrestling Championships	Ulan-Ude, Russia
Win	77–9	(Tuva) Belek-ool Kuzhuget	4–1	11 March–12, 2021	2021 Russian National Freestyle Wrestling Championships	Ulan-Ude, Russia
Win	76–9	(Tuva) Donduk-ool Khuresh-ool	2–1	11 March–12, 2021	2021 Russian National Freestyle Wrestling Championships	Ulan-Ude, Russia
Win	75–9	(Dagestan) Abubakar Mutaliev	TF 10–0	11 March–12, 2021	2021 Russian National Freestyle Wrestling Championships	Ulan-Ude, Russia
Win	74–9	(Rostov Oblast) Umar Khachukaev	TF 10–0	11 March–12, 2021	2021 Russian National Freestyle Wrestling Championships	Ulan-Ude, Russia
2020 Individual World Cup (gold) at 57 kg
Win	73-9	(Armenia) Arsen Harutyunyan	TF 10-0	16 December–18, 2020	2020 Individual Wrestling World Cup	Belgrade, Serbia
Win	72-9	(Iran) Rahman Amouzad	Fall	16 December–18, 2020	2020 Individual Wrestling World Cup	Belgrade, Serbia
Win	71-9	(Kyrgyzstan) Bekbolot Myrzanazar uulu	9-0	16 December–18, 2020	2020 Individual Wrestling World Cup	Belgrade, Serbia
Win	70-9	(Belarus) Uladzislau Andreyeu	TF 11-0	16 December–18, 2020	2020 Individual Wrestling World Cup	Belgrade, Serbia
Win	69-9	(Moldova) Anatolii Buruian	TF 11-0	16 December–18, 2020	2020 Individual Wrestling World Cup	Belgrade, Serbia
2020 Russian Nationals (gold) at 57 kg
Win	68-9	(North Ossetia–Alania) Azamat Tuskaev	1-1	16 October–18, 2020	2020 Russian National Freestyle Wrestling Championships	Naro-Fominsk, Russia
Win	67-9	(Chechnya) Muslim Sadulaev	TF 10-0	16 October–18, 2020	2020 Russian National Freestyle Wrestling Championships	Naro-Fominsk, Russia
Win	66-9	(Sakha Republic) Aleksey Kopylov	TF 10-0	16 October–18, 2020	2020 Russian National Freestyle Wrestling Championships	Naro-Fominsk, Russia
Win	65-9	(Sakha Republic) Petr Konstantinov	TF 10-0	16 October–18, 2020	2020 Russian National Freestyle Wrestling Championships	Naro-Fominsk, Russia
2019 World Championships (gold) at 57 kg
Win	64-9	(Turkey) Süleyman Atlı	TF 13-3	19 September–20, 2019	2019 World Wrestling Championships	Nur-Sultan, Kazakhstan
Win	63-9	(India) Ravi Kumar Dahiya	6-4	19 September–20, 2019	2019 World Wrestling Championships	Nur-Sultan, Kazakhstan
Win	62-9	(Iran) Reza Atri	2-0	19 September–20, 2019	2019 World Wrestling Championships	Nur-Sultan, Kazakhstan
Win	61-9	(Mongolia) Erdenebatyn Bekhbayar	5-2	19 September–20, 2019	2019 World Wrestling Championships	Nur-Sultan, Kazakhstan
Win	60-9	(Azerbaijan) Mahir Amiraslanov	4-3	19 September–20, 2019	2019 World Wrestling Championships	Nur-Sultan, Kazakhstan
Win	59-9	(Russia) Aryan Tyutrin	TF 10-0	16 August 2019	2019 Russian World Team Wrestle-offs	Sochi, Russia
2019 European Games (bronze) at 57 kg
Win	58-9	(Bulgaria) Georgi Vangelov	10-2	25 June–26, 2019	2019 European Games	Minsk, Belarus
Loss	57-9	(Azerbaijan) Mahir Amiraslanov	2-3	25 June–26, 2019	2019 European Games	Minsk, Belarus
Win	57-8	(Armenia) Garik Barseghyan	TF 10-0	25 June–26, 2019	2019 European Games	Minsk, Belarus
Win	56-8	(Moldova) Alexandru Chirtoacă	TF 11-0	25 June–26, 2019	2019 European Games	Minsk, Belarus
2019 Ali Aliev (gold) at 57 kg
Win	55-8	(Russia) Azamat Tuskaev	3-0	1 May–3, 2019	2019 Ali Aliev International	Kaspiysk, Russia
Win	54-8	(Cuba) Reineri Andreu	9-0	1 May–3, 2019	2019 Ali Aliev International	Kaspiysk, Russia
Win	53-8	(Azerbaijan) Giorgi Edisherashvili	TF 10-0	1 May–3, 2019	2019 Ali Aliev International	Kaspiysk, Russia
Win	52-8	(China) Zou Wanhao	8-4	1 May–3, 2019	2019 Ali Aliev International	Kaspiysk, Russia
Win	51-8	(Azerbaijan) Parviz Ibrahimov	2-0	1 May–3, 2019	2019 Ali Aliev International	Kaspiysk, Russia
2018 World Championships (gold) at 57 kg
Win	50-8	(Kazakhstan) Nurislam Sanayev	4-3	21 October–22, 2018	2018 World Wrestling Championships	Budapest, Hungary
Win	49-8	(Japan) Yuki Takahashi	7-2	21 October–22, 2018	2018 World Wrestling Championships	Budapest, Hungary
Win	48-8	(Cuba) Reineri Andreu	6-0	21 October–22, 2018	2018 World Wrestling Championships	Budapest, Hungary
Win	47-8	(Armenia) Mihran Jaburyan	TF 10-0	21 October–22, 2018	2018 World Wrestling Championships	Budapest, Hungary
2018 Russian Nationals (gold) at 57 kg
Win	46-8	(Tuva) Donduk-ool Khuresh-ool	7-1	3 August–5, 2018	2018 Russian National Freestyle Wrestling Championships	Odintsovo, Russia
Win	45-8	(Dagestan) Ismail Gadzhiev	3-0	3 August–5, 2018	2018 Russian National Freestyle Wrestling Championships	Odintsovo, Russia
Win	44-8	(Republic of Crimea (Russia)) Rasul Mashezov	TF 12-0	3 August–5, 2018	2018 Russian National Freestyle Wrestling Championships	Odintsovo, Russia
2018 European Championships (silver) at 57 kg
Loss	43-8	(Azerbaijan) Giorgi Edisherashvili	3-5	4 May–5, 2018	2018 European Wrestling Championships	Kaspiysk, Russia
Win	43-7	(Spain) Levan Metreveli	TF 10-0	4 May–5, 2018	2018 European Wrestling Championships	Kaspiysk, Russia
Win	42-7	(France) Zoheir El-Ouarraqe	6-0	4 May–5, 2018	2018 European Wrestling Championships	Kaspiysk, Russia
Win	41-7	(Serbia) Stevan Mićić	6-4	4 May–5, 2018	2018 European Wrestling Championships	Kaspiysk, Russia
2018 Dan Kolov - Nikola Petrov (gold) at 57 kg
Win	40-7	(France) Zoheir El-Ouarraqe	6-5	22 March–25, 2018	2018 Dan Kolov - Nikola Petrov Memorial	Sofia, Bulgaria
Win	39-7	(Turkey) Barış Kaya	TF 11-1	22 March–25, 2018	2018 Dan Kolov - Nikola Petrov Memorial	Sofia, Bulgaria
Win	38-7	(Georgia (country)) Roberti Dingashvili	TF 11-0	22 March–25, 2018	2018 Dan Kolov - Nikola Petrov Memorial	Sofia, Bulgaria
Win	37-7	(Belarus) Uladzislau Andreyeu	TF 11-0	22 March–25, 2018	2018 Dan Kolov - Nikola Petrov Memorial	Sofia, Bulgaria
2018 Ivan Yarygin Golden Grand Prix (gold) at 57 kg
Win	36-7	(North Ossetia–Alania) Azamat Tuskaev	4-1	26 January 2018	Golden Grand Prix Ivan Yarygin 2018	Krasnoyarsk, Russia
Win	35-7	(United States) Frank Perrelli	8-3	26 January 2018	Golden Grand Prix Ivan Yarygin 2018	Krasnoyarsk, Russia
Win	34-7	(Tuva) Donduk-ool Khuresh-ool	6-3	26 January 2018	Golden Grand Prix Ivan Yarygin 2018	Krasnoyarsk, Russia
Win	33-7	(Mongolia) Tumentsogt Bold	8-0	26 January 2018	Golden Grand Prix Ivan Yarygin 2018	Krasnoyarsk, Russia
2017 D. A. Kunaev Memorial (gold) at 57 kg
Win	32-7	(Kyrgyzstan) Uluk Joldoshbekov	TF 10-0	25 November–26, 2017	2017 D. A. Kunaev Memorial	Taras, Kazakhstan
Win	31-7	(Kazakhstan) Berdakh Primbayev	TF 11-0	25 November–26, 2017	2017 D. A. Kunaev Memorial	Taras, Kazakhstan
Win	30-7	(Brazil) Marat Garipov	TF 12-0	25 November–26, 2017	2017 D. A. Kunaev Memorial	Taras, Kazakhstan
2017 Alans International (silver) at 57 kg
Loss	29-7	(Russia) Azamat Tuskaev	4-7	17 November–19, 2017	2017 Alans International	Vladikavkaz, Russia
Win	29-6	(Russia) Artyom Gebekov	5-2	17 November–19, 2017	2017 Alans International	Vladikavkaz, Russia
Win	28-6	(Armenia) Mihran Jaburyan	TF 10-0	17 November–19, 2017	2017 Alans International	Vladikavkaz, Russia
2017 International Cup (gold) at 57 kg
Win	27-6	(Russia) Abasgadzhi Magomedov	6-3	12 October–13, 2017	2017 International Cup	Khasavyurt, Russia
Win	26-6	(Russia) Said Gazimagomedov	4-0	12 October–13, 2017	2017 International Cup	Khasavyurt, Russia
Win	25-6	(Russia) Ismail Gadzhiev	6-1	12 October–13, 2017	2017 International Cup	Khasavyurt, Russia
Win	24-6	(Russia) Magomedrasul Magomedov	6-0	12 October–13, 2017	2017 International Cup	Khasavyurt, Russia
2017 World Championships 23rd at 57 kg
Loss	23-6	(India) Sandeep Tomar	2-8	25 August 2017	2017 World Wrestling Championships	Paris, France
2017 Russian Nationals (gold) at 57 kg
Win	23-5	(Dagestan) Artem Gebekov	3-1	13 June 2017	2017 Russian National Freestyle Wrestling Championships	Nazran, Russia
Win	22-5	(Sakha Republic) Dmitriy Aksenov	7-1	13 June 2017	2017 Russian National Freestyle Wrestling Championships	Nazran, Russia
Win	21-5	(Republic of Crimea (Russia)) Rasul Mashezov	TF 10-0	13 June 2017	2017 Russian National Freestyle Wrestling Championships	Nazran, Russia
Win	20-5	(Sakha Republic) Aryaan Tyutrin	3-0	13 June 2017	2017 Russian National Freestyle Wrestling Championships	Nazran, Russia
Win	19-5	(Dagestan) Ramazan Ferzaliev	TF 14-4	13 June 2017	2017 Russian National Freestyle Wrestling Championships	Nazran, Russia
2017 European Championships (bronze) at 57 kg
Win	18-5	(France) Zoheir El-Ouarraqe	9-1	2 May 2017	2017 European Wrestling Championships	Novi Sad, Serbia
Loss	17-5	(Azerbaijan) Giorgi Edisherashvili	1-5	2 May 2017	2017 European Wrestling Championships	Novi Sad, Serbia
Win	17-4	(Ukraine) Andriy Yatsenko	Fall	2 May 2017	2017 European Wrestling Championships	Novi Sad, Serbia
Win	16-4	(North Macedonia) Vladimir Egorov	5-3	2 May 2017	2017 European Wrestling Championships	Novi Sad, Serbia
2017 Yaşar Doğu (bronze) at 57 kg
Loss	15-4	(Turkey) Süleyman Atlı	5-7	10–12 March 2017	2017 Yaşar Doğu	Istanbul, Turkey
2017 Ivan Yarygin Golden Grand Prix (gold) at 57 kg
Win	15-3	(Dagestan) Artem Gebekov	TF 10-0	27 January 2017	Golden Grand Prix Ivan Yarygin 2017	Krasnoyarsk, Russia
Win	14-3	(Dagestan) Nariman Israpilov	8-3	27 January 2017	Golden Grand Prix Ivan Yarygin 2017	Krasnoyarsk, Russia
Win	13-3	(Sakha Republic) Aryaan Tyutrin	8-2	27 January 2017	Golden Grand Prix Ivan Yarygin 2017	Krasnoyarsk, Russia
Win	12-3	(Krasnoyarsk Krai) Nurtilek Ermekbaev	TF 12-1	27 January 2017	Golden Grand Prix Ivan Yarygin 2017	Krasnoyarsk, Russia
Win	11-3	(Dagestan) Magomedrasul Idrisov	TF 11-0	27 January 2017	Golden Grand Prix Ivan Yarygin 2017	Krasnoyarsk, Russia
2016 D. A. Kunaev Memorial (bronze) at 57 kg
Win	10-3	(Kazakhstan) Vladimir Kudrin	10-7	26 November–27, 2016	2016 D. A. Kunaev Memorial	Taras, Kazakhstan
Win	9-3	(Russia) Donduk-ool Khuresh-ool	6-3	26 November–27, 2016	2016 D. A. Kunaev Memorial	Taras, Kazakhstan
Loss	8-3	(Kazakhstan) Zhandos Ismailov	Fall	26 November–27, 2016	2016 D. A. Kunaev Memorial	Taras, Kazakhstan
Win	8-2	(Russia) Khasankhusein Badrudinov	4-2	26 November–27, 2016	2016 D. A. Kunaev Memorial	Taras, Kazakhstan
Win	7-2	(Kazakhstan) Margulan Zhussupov	1-0	26 November–27, 2016	2016 D. A. Kunaev Memorial	Taras, Kazakhstan
2016 International Cup (gold) at 57 kg
Win	6-2	(Russia) Magomedrasul Idrisov		14 October–16, 2016	2016 International Cup	Khasavyurt, Russia
Win	5-2	(Russia) Ramazan Ferzaliev	11-4	14 October–16, 2016	2016 International Cup	Khasavyurt, Russia
Win	4-2	(United States) Nico Megaludis	4-3	14 October–16, 2016	2016 International Cup	Khasavyurt, Russia
Win	3-2	(Kazakhstan) Aidarbek Baymuratov	3-0	14 October–16, 2016	2016 International Cup	Khasavyurt, Russia
2016 Ali Aliev 5th at 57 kg
Loss	2-2	(Kyrgyzstan) Ulukbek Zholdoshbekov	3-9	1 July–3, 2016	2016 Ali Aliev International	Makhachkala, Russia
Loss	2-1	(Russia) Artem Gebekov	4-5	1 July–3, 2016	2016 Ali Aliev International	Makhachkala, Russia
Win	2-0	(Azerbaijan) Parviz Ibrahimov	3-1	1 July–3, 2016	2016 Ali Aliev International	Makhachkala, Russia
Win	1-0	(Kazakhstan) Baimuratov Aidarbek	TF 13-2	1 July–3, 2016	2016 Ali Aliev International	Makhachkala, Russia
