= 2018 World Wrestling Championships – Men's freestyle 57 kg =

Men's freestyle 57 kg at the 2018 World Championships
- Venue: László Papp Budapest Sports Arena
- Dates: 21–22 October 2018
- Competitors: 27 from 27 nations

Medalists
gold medal	Zaur Uguev	Russia
silver medal	Nurislam Sanayev	Kazakhstan
bronze medal	Yuki Takahashi	Japan
bronze medal	Süleyman Atlı	Turkey

The men's freestyle 57 kilograms is a competition featured at the 2018 World Wrestling Championships, and was held in Budapest, Hungary on 21 and 22 October.

This freestyle wrestling competition consists of a single-elimination tournament, with a repechage used to determine the winner of two bronze medals. The two finalists face off for gold and silver medals. Each wrestler who loses to one of the two finalists moves into the repechage, culminating in a pair of bronze medal matches featuring the semifinal losers each facing the remaining repechage opponent from their half of the bracket.

Zaur Uguev from Russia won the gold medal.

== Results ==
- R — Retired

=== Final ===
Final
Zaur Uguev (RUS)	4
Nurislam Sanayev (KAZ)	3

=== Top half ===
Round of 32
Reineri Andreu (CUB)	2
Otari Gogava (GEO)	1
Kim Sung-gwon (KOR)	6
Rajmund Farkas (HUN)	0
Yuki Takahashi (JPN)	7
Liu Minghu (CHN)	5
Mikyay Naim (BUL)	8
Levan Metreveli (ESP)	0
Erdenebatyn Bekhbayar (MGL)	1
Reza Atri (IRI)	6

Round of 16
Zaur Uguev (RUS)	10
Mihran Jaburyan (ARM)	0
Reineri Andreu (CUB)	4
Kim Sung-gwon (KOR)	2
Yuki Takahashi (JPN)	12
Mikyay Naim (BUL)	0
Reza Atri (IRI)	5
Uladzislau Andreyeu (BLR)	5

Quarterfinals
Zaur Uguev (RUS)	6
Reineri Andreu (CUB)	0
Yuki Takahashi (JPN)	3
Uladzislau Andreyeu (BLR)	1

Semifinals
Zaur Uguev (RUS)	7
Yuki Takahashi (JPN)	2

=== Bottom half ===
Round of 32
Nurislam Sanayev (KAZ)	10
Josh Failauga (ASA)	0
Andrei Dukov (ROU)	1
Süleyman Atlı (TUR)	12
Nodirjon Safarov (UZB)	7
Vladimir Egorov (MKD)	0
Giorgi Edisherashvili (AZE)	11
Kang Kum-song (PRK)	6
Sandeep Tomar (IND)	10
Cristian Mox (GUA)	0
Givi Davidovi (ITA)	10
Darthe Capellan (CAN)	0

Round of 16
Armen Arakelian (UKR)	0
Nurislam Sanayev (KAZ)	10
Süleyman Atlı (TUR)	14
Nodirjon Safarov (UZB)	4
Giorgi Edisherashvili (AZE)	2
Sandeep Tomar (IND)	2
Givi Davidovi (ITA)	3
Thomas Gilman (USA)	6

Quarterfinals
Nurislam Sanayev (KAZ)	11
Süleyman Atlı (TUR)	6
Giorgi Edisherashvili (AZE)	0
Thomas Gilman (USA)	4

Semifinals
Nurislam Sanayev (KAZ)	11
Thomas Gilman (USA)	0

=== Repechage ===
Repechage round 1
Josh Failauga (ASA)	2
Armen Arakelian (UKR)	0^{R}

Repechage round 2
Mihran Jaburyan (ARM)	3
Reineri Andreu (CUB)	6
Josh Failauga (ASA)	0
Süleyman Atlı (TUR)	10

Bronze medals
Reineri Andreu (CUB)	4
Yuki Takahashi (JPN)	5
Süleyman Atlı (TUR)	5
Thomas Gilman (USA)	4
