= Reineri Andreu =

Cuban wrestler (born 1998)

Personal information
- Nationality: Cuba
- Born: Reineri Andreu Ortega; 1 April 1998 (age 28) Sancti Spíritus, Cuba
- Height: 1.61 m (5 ft 3 in)
- Weight: 62 kg (137 lb)

Sport
- Country: Cuba
- Sport: Amateur wrestling
- Weight class: 57 kg
- Event: Freestyle
- University team: Iowa State University
- Club: Cyclone RTC
Medal record
Men's freestyle wrestling
Representing Cuba
Pan American Games
Bronze medal – third place	2019 Lima	57 kg
Pan American Championships
Gold medal – first place	2018 Lima	57 kg
Gold medal – first place	2020 Ottawa	57 kg
Bronze medal – third place	2019 Buenos Aires	57 kg
Bronze medal – third place	2017 Lauro de Freitas	57 kg
Central American and Caribbean Games
Gold medal – first place	2018 Barranquilla	57 kg
U23 World Championships
Gold medal – first place	2017 Bydgoszcz	57 kg
Gold medal – first place	2019 Budapest	57 kg
Junior Pan American Championships
Bronze medal – third place	2015 Havana	55 kg

Reineri Andreu Ortega (born 1 April 1998) is a Cuban freestyle wrestler. He is a two-time U23 World Champion, two-time Pan American gold medalist and Central American and Caribbean Games gold medalist.

After entering the United States as a refugee in 2022 and enrolling at Iowa State University, he unsuccessfully sued the NCAA for ruling him ineligible to compete for the school due to his prior education in Cuba.

== Career ==
In 2017, at the Pan American Wrestling Championships held in Lauro de Freitas, Brazil, he won one of the bronze medals in the 57 kg event. At the 2017 World U23 Wrestling Championship held in Bydgoszcz, Poland, he won the gold medal in the 57 kg event.

In 2018, he won the gold medal in the 57 kg event at the Pan American Wrestling Championships held in Lima, Peru. At the 2018 Central American and Caribbean Games held in Barranquilla, Colombia, he won the gold medal in the men's 57 kg event.

In March 2020, he won the gold medal in the 57 kg event at the 2020 Pan American Wrestling Championships held in Ottawa, Canada. He also competed in the 2020 Pan American Wrestling Olympic Qualification Tournament, also held in Ottawa, Canada, without qualifying for the 2020 Summer Olympics in Tokyo, Japan. He lost his first match against Thomas Gilman of the United States which meant that he could no longer become one of the top two wrestlers in his event and qualify for the Olympics.

He lost his bronze medal match in the 57 kg event at the 2022 World Wrestling Championships held in Belgrade, Serbia.

In 2023, Andreu Ortega, moved to Ames, Iowa to join Cyclone RTC as a resident athlete.

He challenged Austin DeSanto for the RAF Bantamweight Championship at RAF 10 on June 13, 2026, losing by decision.

== Achievements ==
Year	Tournament	Location	Result	Event
2017	Pan American Wrestling Championships	Lauro de Freitas, Brazil	3rd	Freestyle 57 kg
2018	Pan American Wrestling Championships	Lima, Peru	1st	Freestyle 57 kg
2018	Central American and Caribbean Games	Barranquilla, Colombia	1st	Freestyle 57 kg
2019	Pan American Wrestling Championships	Buenos Aires, Argentina	3rd	Freestyle 57 kg
2019	Pan American Games	Lima, Peru	3rd	Freestyle 57 kg
2020	Pan American Wrestling Championships	Ottawa, Canada	1st	Freestyle 57 kg

== Freestyle record ==
International Freestyle & U23 Freestyle Matches
Res.	Record	Opponent	Score	Date	Event	Location
RAF 10 at 135 lb for the RAF Bantamweight Championship
Loss	60–25	(United States) Austin DeSanto	1–2	June 13, 2026	RAF 10	(United States) St. Louis Missouri
2022 World Championships 5th at 57 kg
Loss	60–24	(Serbia) Stevan Mićić	1–7	September 16–17, 2022	2022 World Championships	Belgrade, Serbia
Win	60–23	(Uzbekistan) Gulomjon Abdullaev	4–3	September 16–17, 2022	2022 World Championships	Belgrade, Serbia
Win	59–23	(Colombia) Óscar Tigreros	TF 10–0	September 16–17, 2022	2022 World Championships	Belgrade, Serbia
Loss	58–23	(Albania) Zelimkhan Abakarov	TF 0–10	September 16–17, 2022	2022 World Championships	Belgrade, Serbia
Win	58–22	(South Africa) Jakobo Tau	TF 10–0	September 16–17, 2022	2022 World Championships	Belgrade, Serbia
2021 World Olympic Qualification Tournament 4th at 57 kg
Loss	57–22	(Japan) Yuki Takahashi	0–2	May 6–7, 2021	2021 World Olympic Qualification Tournament	Sofia, Bulgaria
Win	57–21	(Kyrgyzstan) Almaz Smanbekov	8–5	May 6–7, 2021	2021 World Olympic Qualification Tournament	Sofia, Bulgaria
Win	56–21	(Venezuela) Pedro Mejías	5–0	May 6–7, 2021	2021 World Olympic Qualification Tournament	Sofia, Bulgaria
2020 Pan American Olympic Qualification (bronze) at 57 kg
Win	55–21	(Dominican Republic) Juan Rubelín Ramírez	Fall	March 15, 2020	2020 Pan American Olympic Qualification Tournament	Ottawa, Canada
Win	54–21	(Canada) Ligrit Sadiku	TF 10–0	March 15, 2020	2020 Pan American Olympic Qualification Tournament	Ottawa, Canada
Loss	53–21	(United States) Thomas Gilman	3–4	March 15, 2020	2020 Pan American Olympic Qualification Tournament	Ottawa, Canada
2020 Pan American Championships (gold) at 57 kg
Win	53–20	(Venezuela) Pedro Mejías	4–2	March 6–9, 2020	2020 Pan American Continental Championships	Ottawa, Canada
Win	52–20	(Guatemala) Edwin Segura	TF 10–0	March 6–9, 2020	2020 Pan American Continental Championships	Ottawa, Canada
Win	51–20	(United States) Darian Cruz	TF 12–2	March 6–9, 2020	2020 Pan American Continental Championships	Ottawa, Canada
2020 Granma y Cerro Pelado International (gold) at 57 kg
Win	50–20	(United States) Nathan Tomasello	3–1	February 9–17, 2020	2020 Granma y Cerro Pelado International	Havana, Cuba
Win	49–20	(United States) Sean Russell	TF 11–0	February 9–17, 2020	2020 Granma y Cerro Pelado International	Havana, Cuba
Win	48–20	(Cuba) Osmany Diversent	TF 10–0	February 9–17, 2020	2020 Granma y Cerro Pelado International	Havana, Cuba
2019–20 Deutsche Ringerliga season (gold) for Team Weingarten at 60 kg
Win	47–20	(Russia) Muslim Sadulaev	12–10	January 25, 2020	2019–2020 Deutsche Ringerliga season	Germany
Win	46–20	(Russia) Muslim Sadulaev		January 18, 2020	2019–2020 Deutsche Ringerliga season	Germany
Win	45–20	(Cuba) Yowlys Bonne	8–4	January 11, 2020	2019–2020 Deutsche Ringerliga season	Germany
Win	44–20	(Russia) Dzimchyk Rynchynau	TF 16–0	December 7, 2019	2019–2020 Deutsche Ringerliga season	Germany
Loss	43–20	(Bulgaria) Georgi Vangelov	TF 0–16	November 30, 2019	2019–2020 Deutsche Ringerliga season	Germany
2019 U23 World Championships (gold) at 57 kg
Win	43–19	(Kazakhstan) Adlan Askarov	TF 10–0	October 28 – November 3, 2019	2019 U23 World Championships	Budapest, Hungary
Win	42–19	(Russia) Ramiz Gamzatov	8–2	October 28 – November 3, 2019	2019 U23 World Championships	Budapest, Hungary
Win	41–19	(China) Zou Wanhao	5–5	October 28 – November 3, 2019	2019 U23 World Championships	Budapest, Hungary
Win	40–19	(Azerbaijan) Afgan Khashalov	7–3	October 28 – November 3, 2019	2019 U23 World Championships	Budapest, Hungary
Loss	39–19	(Azerbaijan) Giorgi Edisherashvili	0–6	October 19, 2019	2019–2020 Deutsche Ringerliga season	Germany
Loss	39–18	(Russia) Akhmed Idrisov	0–7	October 12, 2019	2019–2020 Deutsche Ringerliga season	Germany
2019 Pan American Games (bronze) at 57 kg
Win	39–17	(Brazil) Daniel Nascimento	TF 10–0	August 9, 2019	2019 Pan American Games	Lima, Peru
Loss	38–17	(United States) Daton Fix	1–4	August 9, 2019	2019 Pan American Games	Lima, Peru
Win	38–16	(Venezuela) Pedro Mejías	4–0	August 9, 2019	2019 Pan American Games	Lima, Peru
2019 Ali Aliev International (bronze) at 57 kg
Win	37–16	(Azerbaijan) Giorgi Edisherashvili	3–2	May 1–3, 2019	2019 Ali Aliev International	Kaspiysk, Russia
Loss	36–16	(Russia) Zaur Uguev	0–9	May 1–3, 2019	2019 Ali Aliev International	Kaspiysk, Russia
Win	36–15	(Uzbekistan) Abdullaev Gulomjon	3–2	May 1–3, 2019	2019 Ali Aliev International	Kaspiysk, Russia
Win	35–15	(Azerbaijan) Afgan Khashalov	5–2	May 1–3, 2019	2019 Ali Aliev International	Kaspiysk, Russia
Win	34–15	(Armenia) Garik Barseghyan	3–3	May 1–3, 2019	2019 Ali Aliev International	Kaspiysk, Russia
2019 Pan American Championships (bronze) at 57 kg
Win	33–15	(Canada) Darthe Capellan	4–0	April 18–21, 2019	2019 Pan American Continental Championships	Buenos Aires, Argentina
Win	32–15	(Ecuador) Lucas Bryan Navarrete Vidal	TF 14–3	April 18–21, 2019	2019 Pan American Continental Championships	Buenos Aires, Argentina
Loss	31–15	(United States) Josh Rodriguez	2–7	April 18–21, 2019	2019 Pan American Continental Championships	Buenos Aires, Argentina
2019 World Cup DNP at 57 kg
Loss	31–14	(Mongolia) Tuvshintulga Tumenbileg	1–2	March 16–17, 2019	2019 World Cup	Yakutsk, Russia
Win	31–13	(Japan) Yuki Takahashi	2–2	March 16–17, 2019	2019 World Cup	Yakutsk, Russia
Win	30–13	(Turkey) Ali Karaboga	5–2	March 16–17, 2019	2019 World Cup	Yakutsk, Russia
Loss	29–13	(Russia) Aryaan Tyutrin	3–8	March 16–17, 2019	2019 World Cup	Yakutsk, Russia
2018–19 Deutsche Ringerliga season (silver) for Team Weingarten at 60 kg
Loss	29–12	(Bulgaria) Georgi Vangelov	3–3	February 2, 2019	2018–2019 Deutsche Ringerliga season	Germany
Loss	29–11	(Armenia) Arsen Harutyunyan	4–8	January 5, 2019	2018–2019 Deutsche Ringerliga season	Germany
2018 U23 World Championships 7th at 57 kg
Loss	29–10	(China) Wanhao Zou	4–6	November 12–18, 2018	2018 U23 World Championships	Bucharest, Romania
Win	29–9	(Mongolia) Zanabazar Zandanbud	5–2	November 12–18, 2018	2018 U23 World Championships	Bucharest, Romania
Win	28–9	(North Macedonia) Vladimir Egorov	7–0	November 12–18, 2018	2018 U23 World Championships	Bucharest, Romania
2018 World Championships 5th at 57 kg
Loss	27–9	(Japan) Yuki Takahashi	4–5	October 21–22, 2018	2018 World Championships	Budapest, Hungary
Win	27–8	(Armenia) Mihran Jaburyan	6–3	October 21–22, 2018	2018 World Championships	Budapest, Hungary
Loss	26–8	(Russia) Zaur Uguev	0–6	October 21–22, 2018	2018 World Championships	Budapest, Hungary
Win	26–7	(South Korea) Kim Sung-gwon	4–2	October 21–22, 2018	2018 World Championships	Budapest, Hungary
Win	25–7	(Georgia (country)) Otari Gogava	2–1	October 21–22, 2018	2018 World Championships	Budapest, Hungary
Win	24–7	(Monaco) Ghenadie Tulbea	12–2	October 6, 2018	2019–2020 Deutsche Ringerliga season	Germany
Win	23–7	(Russia) Ibragim Ilyasov	2–1	September 29, 2018	2019–2020 Deutsche Ringerliga season	Germany
Loss	22–7	(Bulgaria) Georgi Vangelov	5–10	September 22, 2018	2019–2020 Deutsche Ringerliga season	Germany
Win	22–6	(Armenia) Garik Barseghyan	8–2	September 15, 2018	2019–2020 Deutsche Ringerliga season	Germany
2018 Central American and Caribbean Games (gold) at 57 kg
Win	21–6	(Dominican Republic) Juan Rubelín Ramírez	4–1	July 29 – August 2, 2018	2018 Central American and Caribbean Games	Barranquilla, Colombia
Win	20–6	(Venezuela) Pedro Mejías	4–1	July 29 – August 2, 2018	2018 Central American and Caribbean Games	Barranquilla, Colombia
Win	19–6	(Panama) Evin Batista	TF 10–0	July 29 – August 2, 2018	2018 Central American and Caribbean Games	Barranquilla, Colombia
Win	18–6	(United States) Josh Rodriguez	5–2	May 17, 2018	2018 Beat The Streets: Team USA vs. The World All-Stars	(United States) New York City, New York
2018 Pan American Championships (gold) at 57 kg
Win	17–6	(Colombia) Óscar Tigreros	TF 11–0	May 3–6, 2018	2018 Pan American Continental Championships	Lima, Peru
Win	16–6	(United States) Thomas Gilman	7–4	May 3–6, 2018	2018 Pan American Continental Championships	Lima, Peru
Win	15–6	(Ecuador) Luis Augusto Morales	TF 10–0	May 3–6, 2018	2018 Pan American Continental Championships	Lima, Peru
Win	14–6	(Venezuela) Pedro Mejías	6–2	May 3–6, 2018	2018 Pan American Continental Championships	Lima, Peru
2018 World Cup DNP at 57 kg
Loss	13–6	(Japan) Yuki Takahashi	4–7	April 7–8, 2018	2018 World Cup	(United States) Iowa City, Iowa
Win	13–5	(Kazakhstan) Mukhambet Kuatbek	4–1	April 7–8, 2018	2018 World Cup	(United States) Iowa City, Iowa
Loss	12–5	(Mongolia) Erdenebatyn Bekhbayar	0–4	April 7–8, 2018	2018 World Cup	(United States) Iowa City, Iowa
Loss	12–4	(Azerbaijan) Giorgi Edisherashvili	5–7	April 7–8, 2018	2018 World Cup	(United States) Iowa City, Iowa
2018 Central American and Caribbean Championships (gold) at 57 kg
Win	12–3	(Dominican Republic) Juan Ramirez	TF 10–0	March 20–25, 2018	2018 Central American and Caribbean Championships	Havana, Cuba
Win	11–3	(Honduras) Brandon Escobar	TF 10–0	March 20–25, 2018	2018 Central American and Caribbean Championships	Havana, Cuba
Win	10–3	(Panama) Evin Batista	TF 10–0	March 20–25, 2018	2018 Central American and Caribbean Championships	Havana, Cuba
2018 Granma y Cerro Pelado RS 9th at 57 kg
Loss	9–3	(United States) Joey Dance	Fall	February 15–23, 2018	2018 Granma y Cerro Pelado Ranking Series	Havana, Cuba
2017 U23 World Championships (gold) at 57 kg
Win	9–2	(Bulgaria) Mikyay Naim	6–1	November 21–26, 2017	2017 U23 World Championships	Bydgoszcz, Poland
Win	8–2	(Azerbaijan) Parviz Ibrahimov	5–4	November 21–26, 2017	2017 U23 World Championships	Bydgoszcz, Poland
Win	7–2	(North Macedonia) Vladimir Egorov	3–1	November 21–26, 2017	2017 U23 World Championships	Bydgoszcz, Poland
Win	6–2	(Kazakhstan) Zhandos Ismailov	4–0	November 21–26, 2017	2017 U23 World Championships	Bydgoszcz, Poland
Win	5–2	(Poland) Robert Dobrodziej	TF 10–0	November 21–26, 2017	2017 U23 World Championships	Bydgoszcz, Poland
2017 Pan American Championships (bronze) at 57 kg
Win	4–2	(Mexico) Victor Barron	TF 10–0	May 5–7, 2017	2017 Pan American Continental Championships	Lauro de Freitas, Brazil
Win	3–2	(Chile) Andre Quispe	TF 15–4	May 5–7, 2017	2017 Pan American Continental Championships	Lauro de Freitas, Brazil
Loss	2–2	(Canada) Aso Palani	12–17	May 5–7, 2017	2017 Pan American Continental Championships	Lauro de Freitas, Brazil
Win	2–1	(Argentina) Lucas Pavon	TF 10–0	May 5–7, 2017	2017 Pan American Continental Championships	Lauro de Freitas, Brazil
2015 Granma y Cerro Pelado International DNP at 57 kg
Loss	1–1	(United States) Sam Hazewinkel	4–5	February 11–15, 2015	2015 Granma y Cerro Pelado International	Havana, Cuba
Win	1–0	(Ecuador) Jefferson Mayea	TF 10–0	February 11–15, 2015	2015 Granma y Cerro Pelado International	Havana, Cuba
