= 2019 World Wrestling Championships – Men's freestyle 57 kg =

Men's freestyle 57 kg at the 2019 World Championships
- Venue: Barys Arena
- Dates: 19–20 September 2019
- Competitors: 35 from 35 nations

Medalists
gold medal	Zaur Uguev	Russia
silver medal	Süleyman Atlı	Turkey
bronze medal	Nurislam Sanayev	Kazakhstan
bronze medal	Ravi Kumar Dahiya	India

The men's freestyle 57 kilograms is a competition featured at the 2019 World Wrestling Championships, and was held in Nur-Sultan, Kazakhstan on 19 and 20 September.

== Results ==
Legend

- F — Won by fall
- WO — Won by walkover

=== Finals ===
Semifinals		Final
Süleyman Atlı (TUR)	5
Nurislam Sanayev (KAZ)	3	Süleyman Atlı (TUR)	3
Ravi Kumar Dahiya (IND)	4	Zaur Uguev (RUS)	13
Zaur Uguev (RUS)	6

=== Top half ===
==== Section 1 ====
Round of 64

Round of 32
Süleyman Atlı (TUR)	12
Liang Shaofeng (CHN)	2
Levan Metreveli (ESP)	1
Givi Davidovi (ITA)	3
Chakir Ansari (MAR)	3
Stevan Mićić (SRB)	14
Darthe Capellan (CAN)	11
Junjun Asebias (FSM)	0

Round of 16
Süleyman Atlı (TUR)	10
Givi Davidovi (ITA)	0
Stevan Mićić (SRB)	10
Darthe Capellan (CAN)	2

Quarterfinals
Süleyman Atlı (TUR)	5
Stevan Mićić (SRB)	4

==== Section 2 ====
Round of 64

Round of 32
Myrat Hojanepesow (TKM)	2
Óscar Tigreros (COL)	7
Mohamed Camara (GUI)	0
Abdelhak Kherbache (ALG)	4^{F}
Daniel Popov (ISR)	2
Horst Lehr (GER)	6
Anatolii Buruian (MDA)	0
Nurislam Sanayev (KAZ)	11

Round of 16
Óscar Tigreros (COL)	7
Abdelhak Kherbache (ALG)	6
Horst Lehr (GER)	0
Nurislam Sanayev (KAZ)	7

Quarterfinals
Óscar Tigreros (COL)	6
Nurislam Sanayev (KAZ)	10

=== Bottom half ===
==== Section 3 ====
Round of 64

Round of 32
Yuki Takahashi (JPN)	12
Diamantino Iuna Fafé (GBS)	5
Vladimir Egorov (MKD)	1
Daton Fix (USA)	12
Otari Gogava (GEO)	4
Arsen Harutyunyan (ARM)	9
Kim Sung-gwon (KOR)	0
Ravi Kumar Dahiya (IND)	11

Round of 16
Yuki Takahashi (JPN)	4
Daton Fix (USA)	2
Arsen Harutyunyan (ARM)	6
Ravi Kumar Dahiya (IND)	17

Quarterfinals
Yuki Takahashi (JPN)	1
Ravi Kumar Dahiya (IND)	6

==== Section 4 ====
Round of 64
Erdenebatyn Bekhbayar (MGL)	8
Muhamad Ikromov (TJK)	6
Lowe Bingham (NRU)	0
Jahongirmirza Turobov (UZB)	12
Mahir Amiraslanov (AZE)	5
Ulukbek Zholdoshbekov (KGZ)	4

Round of 32
Reza Atri (IRI)	4
Uladzislau Andreyeu (BLR)	2
Kang Kum-song (PRK)	12
Andriy Yatsenko (UKR)	6
Erdenebatyn Bekhbayar (MGL)	6
Jahongirmirza Turobov (UZB)	0
Mahir Amiraslanov (AZE)	3
Zaur Uguev (RUS)	4

Round of 16
Reza Atri (IRI)	4
Kang Kum-song (PRK)	2
Erdenebatyn Bekhbayar (MGL)	2
Zaur Uguev (RUS)	5

Quarterfinals
Reza Atri (IRI)	0
Zaur Uguev (RUS)	2

=== Repechage ===
Repechage round 2
~~Liang Shaofeng (CHN)~~
Givi Davidovi (ITA)	WO
Mahir Amiraslanov (AZE)	4
Erdenebatyn Bekhbayar (MGL)	4

Repechage round 3
Givi Davidovi (ITA)	0
Stevan Mićić (SRB)	8
Erdenebatyn Bekhbayar (MGL)	4
Reza Atri (IRI)	4

Bronze medals
Stevan Mićić (SRB)	3
Nurislam Sanayev (KAZ)	4
Reza Atri (IRI)	3
Ravi Kumar Dahiya (IND)	6
