= Wrestling at the 2020 Summer Olympics – Men's freestyle 57 kg =

Men's freestyle 57 kg at the Games of the XXXII Olympiad
- Venue: Makuhari Messe
- Date: 4–5 August 2021
- Competitors: 16 from 16 nations

Medalists
1st place, gold medalist(s)		Zaur Uguev	ROC
2nd place, silver medalist(s)		Ravi Kumar Dahiya	India
3rd place, bronze medalist(s)		Nurislam Sanayev	Kazakhstan
3rd place, bronze medalist(s)		Thomas Gilman	United States

The men's freestyle 57 kilograms competition at the 2020 Summer Olympics in Tokyo, Japan, took place on 4–5 August 2021 at the Makuhari Messe in Mihama-ku.

This freestyle wrestling competition consists of a single-elimination tournament, with a repechage used to determine the winner of two bronze medals. The two finalists face off for gold and silver medals. Each wrestler who loses to one of the two finalists moves into the repechage, culminating in a pair of bronze medal matches featuring the semifinal losers each facing the remaining repechage opponent from their half of the bracket.

== Schedule ==
All times are Japan Standard Time (UTC+09:00)

Date	Time	Event
4 August 2021	11:00	Qualification rounds
4 August 2021	18:15	Semifinals
5 August 2021	11:00	Repechage
5 August 2021	19:30	Finals

== Results ==
Legend

- F — Won by fall

=== Main bracket ===
1/8 finals
Stevan Mićić (SRB)	0
Yuki Takahashi (JPN)	7
Nurislam Sanayev (KAZ)	7
Diamantino Iuna Fafé (GBS)	0
Abdelhak Kherbache (ALG)	0
Georgi Vangelov (BUL)	11^{F}
Óscar Tigreros (COL)	2
Ravi Kumar Dahiya (IND)	13
Süleyman Atlı (TUR)	2
Reza Atri (IRI)	3
Arsen Harutyunyan (ARM)	1
Erdenebatyn Bekhbayar (MGL)	6
Liu Minghu (CHN)	2
Gulomjon Abdullaev (UZB)	10
Thomas Gilman (USA)	4
Zaur Uguev (ROC)	5

1/4 finals
Yuki Takahashi (JPN)	4
Nurislam Sanayev (KAZ)	4
Georgi Vangelov (BUL)	4
Ravi Kumar Dahiya (IND)	14
Reza Atri (IRI)	5
Erdenebatyn Bekhbayar (MGL)	1
Gulomjon Abdullaev (UZB)	6
Zaur Uguev (ROC)	6

Semifinals
Nurislam Sanayev (KAZ)	9
Ravi Kumar Dahiya (IND)	7^{F}
Reza Atri (IRI)	3
Zaur Uguev (ROC)	8

Final
Ravi Kumar Dahiya (IND)	4
Zaur Uguev (ROC)	7

=== Repechage ===
Repechage
Óscar Tigreros (COL)	4
Georgi Vangelov (BUL)	13^{F}
Thomas Gilman (USA)	11
Gulomjon Abdullaev (UZB)	1

Bronze medal matches
Georgi Vangelov (BUL)	1
Nurislam Sanayev (KAZ)	5
Thomas Gilman (USA)	9
Reza Atri (IRI)	1

== Final standing ==
Rank	Athlete
1st place, gold medalist(s)	Zaur Uguev (ROC)
2nd place, silver medalist(s)	Ravi Kumar Dahiya (IND)
3rd place, bronze medalist(s)	Nurislam Sanayev (KAZ)
3rd place, bronze medalist(s)	Thomas Gilman (USA)
5	Georgi Vangelov (BUL)
5	Reza Atri (IRI)
7	Gulomjon Abdullaev (UZB)
8	Yuki Takahashi (JPN)
9	Erdenebatyn Bekhbayar (MGL)
10	Óscar Tigreros (COL)
11	Süleyman Atlı (TUR)
12	Liu Minghu (CHN)
13	Arsen Harutyunyan (ARM)
14	Stevan Mićić (SRB)
15	Diamantino Iuna Fafé (GBS)
16	Abdelhak Kherbache (ALG)
