= Ravi Kumar Dahiya =

Indian freestyle wrestler

Personal information
- Born: 12 December 1997 (age 28) Nahri, Haryana, India
- Height: 170 cm (5 ft 7 in)

Sport
- Country: India
- Sport: Wrestling
- Weight class: 57 kg; 65 kg
- Event: Freestyle
Medal record
Men's freestyle wrestling
Representing India
| Event | 1st | 2nd | 3rd |
|---|---|---|---|
| Olympic Games | - | 1 | - |
| World Championships | - | - | 1 |
| Asian Championships | 3 | - | - |
| Commonwealth Games | 1 | - | - |
| World U23 Championships | - | 1 | - |
| World Junior Championships | - | 1 | - |
| Total | 4 | 3 | 1 |
Olympic Games
| Silver medal – second place | 2020 Tokyo | 57 kg |
World Championships
| Bronze medal – third place | 2019 Nur-Sultan | 57 kg |
Commonwealth Games
| Gold medal – first place | 2022 Birmingham | 57 kg |
Grand Prix
| Gold medal – first place | 2022 Istanbul | 61 kg |
Asian Championships
| Gold medal – first place | 2020 New Delhi | 57 kg |
| Gold medal – first place | 2021 Almaty | 57 kg |
| Gold medal – first place | 2022 Ulaanbaatar | 57 kg |
World U23 Championships
| Silver medal – second place | 2018 Bucharest | 57 kg |
World U20 Championships
| Silver medal – second place | 2015 Salvador | 55 kg |

Ravi Kumar Dahiya (born 12 December 1997), also known as Ravi Kumar or Ravi Dahiya, is an Indian freestyle wrestler who won a silver medal at the 2020 Tokyo Olympics in the 57 kg category. Dahiya is also a bronze medallist from 2019 World Wrestling Championships and a three-time Asian champion. At the 2022 Commonwealth Games in Birmingham, he won the gold medal in the men's 57kg freestyle wrestling category.

== Early life ==
Dahiya was born on 12 December 1997 in Nahri village, Sonipat district, Haryana. Since age 10, Dahiya was trained by Satpal Singh at the Chhatrasal Stadium in Delhi. His father Rakesh Dahiya, a small farmer, would travel around 39 km every day from their village to Chhatrasal Stadium to deliver fresh milk and fruits, which were part of his wrestling diet, for more than a decade.

== Career ==
Dahiya started wrestling in his early teens and won the silver medal in the 2015 Junior World Wrestling Championships at Salvador de Bahia in the 55 kg freestyle category. He picked up an injury in 2017 which kept him out of action for more than a year. In his comeback year, he won the silver medal at the 2018 World U23 Wrestling Championship in Bucharest, India's only medal at the competition, in the 57 kg category. Dahiya remained unbeaten at the 2019 Pro Wrestling League, representing the title winning team, Haryana Hammers.

He was tied fifth at the 2019 Asian Wrestling Championships in Xi'an, after losing the bronze medal match.

In his World Championships debut in 2019, Dahiya defeated the European champion Arsen Harutyunyan in the round of 16, and the 2017 world champion Yuki Takahashi in the quarterfinal, to earn one of the six available quota places for the 2020 Summer Olympics. He lost to defending champion and eventual gold medalist Zaur Uguev in the semifinal round. However, he managed to take the bronze after defeating Reza Atri of Iran. On the back of his medal win, Dahiya was included in the Ministry of Youth Affairs and Sports' Target Olympic Podium Scheme (TOPS) in October 2019.

Dahiya won gold at the 2020 Asian Wrestling Championships in New Delhi and the 2021 Asian Wrestling Championships in Almaty.

At the 2020 Summer Olympics, Dahiya won his first two bouts on technical superiority. In the semifinal, he pinned the Kazakh wrestler Nurislam Sanayev down in the final minute to win by fall, after trailing in the bout on points. There were reports that Dahiya endured a bite from his opponent, Nurislam Sanayev in the semi-final match. In the final, Dahiya had to settle for a silver as he was defeated 4–7 on points by ROC wrestler Zaur Uguev. Dahiya became the second Indian wrestler to win an Olympic silver after Sushil Kumar.

At the 2022 Yasar Dogu Tournament, he won the gold medal after defeating Uzbek Gulomjon Abdullaev 11–10 in the final. At the 2022 World Wrestling Championships, he lost to Uzbekistan's Gulomjon Abdullaev in the pre-quarterfinals.

== Awards and recognition ==
=== National award ===
- 2021 – Major Dhyan Chand Khel Ratna Award, the highest sporting honour of India.

=== Rewards ===
For winning the silver medal at the 2020 Tokyo Summer Olympics

- ₹50 lakh (US$52,000) from the Government of India.
- ₹4 crore (US$420,000) from the Government of Haryana.
- ₹50 lakh (US$52,000) from the Board of Control for Cricket in India
- ₹40 lakh (US$42,000) from the Indian Olympic Association.

== International competition ==
=== Olympics ===
| Year | Competition | Venue | Event | Rank | Opponent |
|---|---|---|---|---|---|
| 2021 | 2020 Summer Olympics | Tokyo | 57 kg | 2nd place, silver medalist(s) | Zaur Uguev (RUS) |

=== World Championship ===
| Year | Competition | Venue | Event | Rank | Opponent |
|---|---|---|---|---|---|
| 2019 | 2019 World Wrestling Championships | Nur-Sultan | 57 kg | 3rd place, bronze medalist(s) | Reza Atri (IRI) |
| 2022 | 2022 World Wrestling Championships | Belgrade | 57 kg | 6th | Gulomjon Abdullaev (UZB) |

=== U23 World Championship ===
| Year | Competition | Venue | Event | Rank | opponent |
|---|---|---|---|---|---|
| 2018 | 2018 World U23 Wrestling Championships | Bucharest | 57 kg | 2nd place, silver medalist(s) | Toshihiro Hasegawa (JPN) |

=== World Junior Championship ===
| Year | Competition | Venue | Event | Rank | opponent |
|---|---|---|---|---|---|
| 2015 | 2015 World Junior Wrestling Championships | Salvador, Bahia | 56 kg | 2nd place, silver medalist(s) | Mahir Amiraslanov (AZE) |

=== Commonwealth Games ===
| Year | Competition | Venue | Event | Rank | Opponent |
|---|---|---|---|---|---|
| 2022 | 2022 Commonwealth Games | Birmingham | 57 kg | 1st place, gold medalist(s) | Ebikewenimo Welson (NGR) |

=== Asian Wrestling Championship ===
| Year | Competition | Venue | Event | Rank | Opponent |
|---|---|---|---|---|---|
| 2022 | 2022 Asian Wrestling Championships | Ulanbaatar | 57kg | 1st place, gold medalist(s) | Rakhat Kalzhan (KAZ) |
| 2021 | 2021 Asian Wrestling Championships | Almaty | 57kg | 1st place, gold medalist(s) | Alireza Sarlak (IRI) |
| 2020 | 2020 Asian Wrestling Championships | New Delhi | 57kg | 1st place, gold medalist(s) | Hikmatullo Vohidov (TJK) |
| 2019 | 2019 Asian Wrestling Championships | Xi'an | 57kg | 5th | Kang Kum-song (PRK) |

== Record against opponents ==
| Weight | Players | Matches | Results | | Change |
| Weight | Players | Matches | Won | Lost | Change |
|---|---|---|---|---|---|
| 57 kg | (Russia) Zaur Uguev | 2 | 0 | 2 | -2 |
| 57 kg | (Iran) Reza Atri | 1 | 1 | 0 | +1 |
| 57 kg | (Japan) Yuki Takahashi | 3 | 2 | 1 | +1 |
| 57 kg | (Kazakhstan) Nurislam Sanayev | 4 | 4 | 0 | +4 |
| 57 kg | (Kazakhstan) Meirambek Kartbay | 1 | 1 | 0 | +1 |
| 57 kg | (Armenia) Arsen Harutyunyan | 1 | 1 | 0 | +1 |
| 57 kg | (Azerbaijan) Mahir Amiraslanov | 1 | 0 | 1 | -1 |
| 57 kg | (Belarus) Uladzislau Andreyeu | 1 | 0 | 1 | -1 |
| 57 kg | (Uzbekistan) Jahongirmirza Turobov | 1 | 1 | 0 | +1 |
| 57 kg | (Uzbekistan) Gulomjon Abdullaev | 4 | 2 | 3 | -1 |
| 57 kg | (Uzbekistan) Makhmudjon Shavkatov | 1 | 1 | 0 | +1 |
| 57 kg | (South Korea) Kim Sung-gwon | 1 | 1 | 0 | +1 |
| 57 kg | (North Korea) Kang Kum-song | 1 | 0 | 1 | -1 |
| 57 kg | (Tajikistan) Hikmatullo Vohidov | 1 | 1 | 0 | +1 |
| 57 kg | (Russia) Petr Konstantinov | 1 | 1 | 0 | +1 |
| 57 kg | (Russia) Nodar Arabidze | 1 | 1 | 0 | +1 |
| 61 kg | (Ukraine) Volodymyr Burukov | 1 | 0 | 1 | -1 |
| 57 kg | (Pakistan) Ali Asad | 1 | 1 | 0 | +1 |
