= Erdenebatyn Bekhbayar =

Mongolian freestyle wrestler

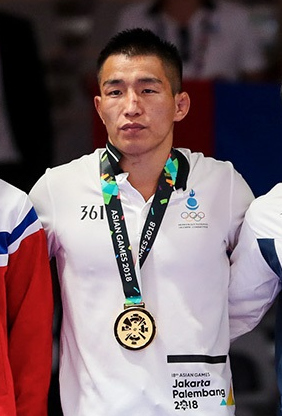
- Bekhbayar at the 2018 Asian Games

Personal information
- Native name: Эрдэнэбатын Бэхбаяр
- Nationality: Mongolian
- Born: 13 August 1992 (age 34) Ulaanbaatar, Mongolia
- Height: 160 cm (5 ft 3 in)

Sport
- Country: Mongolia
- Sport: Wrestling
- Weight class: 57 kg
- Event: Freestyle
- Club: Sport club of Ireedui Institute
- Coached by: Avirmediin Enkhee

Achievements and titles
- Olympic finals: 9th (2020)
- World finals: (bronze) (2015) (bronze) (2017)
- Regional finals: (gold) (2015) (gold) (2018)
Medal record
Men's freestyle wrestling
Representing Mongolia
World Championships
Bronze medal – third place	2017 Paris	57 kg
Bronze medal – third place	2015 Las Vegas	57 kg
Asian Games
Gold medal – first place	2018 Jakarta	57 kg
Asian Championships
Gold medal – first place	2015 Doha	57 kg
Grand Prix
Gold medal – first place	2024 Croatia	61kg
Golden Grand Prix
Bronze medal – third place	2015 Krasnoyarsk	57 kg
Bronze medal – third place	2015 Baku	57 kg
Takhti Cup
Gold medal – first place	2018 Tabriz	57 kg
Dan Kolov & Nikola Petrov Tournament
Gold medal – first place	2017 Russe	57 kg
Alany Tournament
Silver medal – second place	2019 Vladikavkas	57 kg
Olympic Qualification Tournament
Silver medal – second place	2021 Sofia	57 kg
U20 Word Championships
Gold medal – first place	2012 Pattaya	55 kg
Asian Cadets Championships
Silver medal – second place	2009 Pune	50 kg

Erdenebatyn Bekhbayar (Mongolian: Эрдэнэбатын Бэхбаяр; born 13 August 1992) is a Mongolian freestyle wrestler who competes in the 57 kg division. He won a gold medal at the 2018 Asian Games and bronze medals at the 2015 and 2017 world championships. The 2012 U20 World champion and undefeated 2018 World Cup wrestler. He competed at the 2016 and 2020 Olympics.

== Freestyle career ==
Bekhbayar took up wrestling in 2006.

At the 2015 Golden Grand Prix Ivan Yarygin he won bronze medal in the 57 kg event after defeating 2013 Golden Grand Prix Ivan Yarygin′s Champion and 2014 Russian National Cup Winner Artem Gebekov 2-1.

At the 2015 Asian Championships he defeated Samat Nadyrbek Uulu 4-1 in the final, winning the gold medal in the 57 kg event.

At the 2015 World Championships he beat Aleksei Baskakov 10–0, Ghenadie Tulbea 12–1, Yuki Takahashi 2–1, lost to 2015 World Champion Vladimer Khinchegashvili by 2–10 in the semifinal, and took bronze medal in the 57 kg event after defeating Artas Sanaa 5–1.

He was named the 2015 Mongolian Male Athlete of the Year.

At the 2016 Summer Olympics he earned the 14th place in the 57 kg event, losing in the qualifications to Adama Diatta by criteria with the score of 3-3.

At the 2017 World Championships, Bekhbayar competed in the 57 kg event. In the qualifications, he defeated Ulukbek Zholdoshbekov by technical superiority, then left no chance for multiple European Champion Süleyman Atlı, beating him with a score of 7-0. He lost on criteria after a 4-4 tie with eventual World Champion Yuki Takahashi in the quarterfinal. In the fourth round, he won by technical fall over 2014 World Military Champion Sandeep Tomar who had previously beaten reigning Russian National Champion Zaur Uguev. In the bronze medal match, he dominated with a convincing 9-2 victory over World and European Championships multimedalist Vladimir Dubov.

At the 2018 World Cup he earned the 6th place in the 57 kg event, with wins over Mukhambet Kuatbek (10-0), 2017 U23 World and 2018 Pan American Champion Reineri Andreu (4-0), Afgan Khashalov (2-1), and Teimuraz Vanishvili (4-0), leaving the tournament undefeated in the individual standings.

At the 2018 Asian Games he beat 2016 World Cup Champion Reza Atri (8-2), and 2018 Asian Champion Kang Kum-song (8-2) who had previously beaten reigning World Champion Yuki Takahashi (9-5), winning the gold medal in the 57 kg event.

At the 2019 Alany Tournament he received silver medal in the 57 kg event, defeating reigning Russian National Champion Ramiz Gamzatov 4-1 in the semifinal before losing to Akhmed Idrisov by 2-5 in the final.

At the 2021 Olympic Qualification Tournament he received silver medal in the 57 kg event, losing in the final round by medical forfeit.

At the 2020 Summer Olympics he earned the 9th place in the 57 kg event, defeating Arsen Harutyunyan 6-1 before losing to Reza Atri by 1-5 in the qualifications.

At the 2024 Zagreb Open he beat 2021 U23 World and 2023 European Champion Aliabbas Rzazade by fall in the semifinal, Andrii Dzhelep 9-2 in the final, winning the gold medal in the 61 kg event.
