= 2019 European Wrestling Championships – Men's freestyle 57 kg =

The men's freestyle 57 kg is a competition featured at the 2019 European Wrestling Championships, and was held in Bucharest, Romania on April 8 and April 9.

== Medalists ==
Gold	Süleyman Atlı; Turkey
Silver	Muslim Sadulaev; Russia
Bronze	Mahir Amiraslanov; Azerbaijan
Bronze	Vladimir Egorov; North Macedonia

== Results ==
Legend

- F — Won by fall

=== Final ===
Final
Muslim Sadulaev (RUS)	3
Süleyman Atlı (TUR)	8

=== Top half ===
Round of 32

Round of 16
Levan Metreveli (ESP)	10
Natanel Saidov (ISR)	0
Vladimir Egorov (NMK)	2
Muslim Sadulaev (RUS)	5
Givi Davidovi (ITA)	12
Sebastian Kolompar (SRB)	1
Andrei Dukov (ROU)	7
Vaghinak Matevosyan (ARM)	0

Quarterfinals
Levan Metreveli (ESP)	2
Muslim Sadulaev (RUS)	4
Givi Davidovi (ITA)	2
Andrei Dukov (ROU)	4

Semifinals
Muslim Sadulaev (RUS)	10
Andrei Dukov (ROU)	0

=== Bottom half ===
Round of 32
Zoheir El-Ouarraqe (FRA)	12
Drilon Syla (KOS)	2

Round of 16
Taras Markovych (UKR)	6
Dzimchyk Rynchynau (BLR)	9
Georgi Vangelov (BUL)	4
Otari Gogava (GEO)	1
Alexandru Chirtoacă (MDA)	7
Mahir Amiraslanov (AZE)	9
Süleyman Atlı (TUR)	11
Zoheir El-Ouarraqe (FRA)	0

Quarterfinals
Dzimchyk Rynchynau (BLR)	1
Georgi Vangelov (BUL)	2
Mahir Amiraslanov (AZE)	3
Süleyman Atlı (TUR)	6

Semifinals
Georgi Vangelov (BUL)	4
Süleyman Atlı (TUR)	8

=== Repechage ===
Repechage round 1
Vladimir Egorov (NMK)	3^{F}
Levan Metreveli (ESP)	3
Zoheir El-Ouarraqe (FRA)	5
Mahir Amiraslanov (AZE)	10

Bronze medal match
Vladimir Egorov (NMK)	7
Andrei Dukov (ROU)	4
Mahir Amiraslanov (AZE)	8
Georgi Vangelov (BUL)	4
