= 2020 European Wrestling Championships – Men's freestyle 57 kg =

Wrestling competition

The men's freestyle 57 kg is a competition featured at the 2020 European Wrestling Championships, and was held in Rome, Italy on February 14 and February 15.

== Medalists ==
Gold	Azamat Tuskaev; Russia
Silver	Süleyman Atlı; Turkey
Bronze	Horst Lehr; Germany
Bronze	Stevan Mićić; Serbia

== Results ==
Legend

- F — Won by fall
- WO — Won by walkover

=== Final ===
Final
Azamat Tuskaev (RUS)	3
Süleyman Atlı (TUR)	1

=== Top half ===
Round of 32

Round of 16
Georgi Vangelov (BUL)	9
Otari Gogava (GEO)	0
Azamat Tuskaev (RUS)	10
Levan Metreveli (ESP)	0
Afgan Khashalov (AZE)	11
Valentin Damour (FRA)	0
Taras Markovych (UKR)	6
Horst Lehr (GER)	7

Quarterfinals
Georgi Vangelov (BUL)	2
Azamat Tuskaev (RUS)	6
Afgan Khashalov (AZE)	2
Horst Lehr (GER)	8

Semifinals
Azamat Tuskaev (RUS)	5
Horst Lehr (GER)	4

=== Bottom half ===
Round of 32
Süleyman Atlı (TUR)	WO
Ioannis Martidis (GRE)

Round of 16
Daniel Popov (ISR)	4
Anatolii Buruian (MDA)	10
Dzimchyk Rynchynau (BLR)	4
Mihran Jaburyan (ARM)	6
Givi Davidovi (ITA)	4
Andrei Dukov (ROU)	4
Stevan Mićić (SRB)	5
Süleyman Atlı (TUR)	7

Quarterfinals
Anatolii Buruian (MDA)	0
Mihran Jaburyan (ARM)	5
Andrei Dukov (ROU)	1
Süleyman Atlı (TUR)	7

Semifinals
Mihran Jaburyan (ARM)	3
Süleyman Atlı (TUR)	6

=== Repechage ===
Repechage round 1
Ioannis Martidis (GRE)
Stevan Mićić (SRB)	WO

Repechage round 2
Levan Metreveli (ESP)	0
Georgi Vangelov (BUL)	10
Stevan Mićić (SRB)	7^{F}
Andrei Dukov (ROU)	0

Bronze medal match
Georgi Vangelov (BUL)	3
Horst Lehr (GER)	6
Stevan Mićić (SRB)	10
Mihran Jaburyan (ARM)	0

== Final standing ==
Rank	Athlete
1st place, gold medalist(s)	Azamat Tuskaev (RUS)
2nd place, silver medalist(s)	Süleyman Atlı (TUR)
3rd place, bronze medalist(s)	Horst Lehr (GER)
3rd place, bronze medalist(s)	Stevan Mićić (SRB)
5	Georgi Vangelov (BUL)
5	Mihran Jaburyan (ARM)
7	Afgan Khashalov (AZE)
8	Andrei Dukov (ROU)
9	Anatolii Buruian (MDA)
10	Taras Markovych (UKR)
11	Givi Davidovi (ITA)
12	Dzimchyk Rynchynau (BLR)
13	Daniel Popov (ISR)
14	Otari Gogava (GEO)
15	Valentin Damour (FRA)
16	Levan Metreveli (ESP)
17	Ioannis Martidis (GRE)
