= 2018 European Wrestling Championships – Men's freestyle 57 kg =

The men's freestyle 57 kg is a competition featured at the 2018 European Wrestling Championships, and was held in Kaspiysk, Russia on May 4 and May 5.

== Medalists ==
Gold	Giorgi Edisherashvili; Azerbaijan
Silver	Zaur Uguev; Russia
Bronze	Stevan Mićić; Serbia
Bronze	Uladzislau Andreyeu; Belarus

== Results ==
Legend

- F — Won by fall

=== Main Bracket ===
Qualification
Otari Gogava (GEO)	3
Zoheir El-Ouarraqe (FRA)	3
Stevan Mićić (SRB)	4
Zaur Uguev (RUS)	6
Armen Arakelian (UKR)	15
Ivan Zamfirov (MDA)	4
Uladzislau Andreyeu (BLR)	6
Ahmet Peker (TUR)	2
Giorgi Edisherashvili (AZE)	10
Mikyay Naim (BUL)	0
Mihran Jaburyan (ARM)	10
Andrei Dukov (ROU)	0

Quarterfinals
Levan Metreveli (ESP)	10
Yuriy Holub (ISR)	4
Zoheir El-Ouarraqe (FRA)	0
Zaur Uguev (RUS)	6
Armen Arakelian (UKR)	2
Uladzislau Andreyeu (BLR)	7
Giorgi Edisherashvili (AZE)	10
Mihran Jaburyan (ARM)	0

Semifinals
Levan Metreveli (ESP)	0
Zaur Uguev (RUS)	10
Uladzislau Andreyeu (BLR)	1
Giorgi Edisherashvili (AZE)	4

Final
Zaur Uguev (RUS)	3
Giorgi Edisherashvili (AZE)	5

=== Repechage ===
Repechage round 1
Stevan Mićić (SRB)	8
Zoheir El-Ouarraqe (FRA)	4
Mikyay Naim (BUL)	1
Mihran Jaburyan (ARM)	4

Bronze medal match
Stevan Mićić (SRB)	10^{F}
Levan Metreveli (ESP)	0
Mihran Jaburyan (ARM)	1
Uladzislau Andreyeu (BLR)	8
