= Russian National Freestyle 2017 – Men's freestyle 57 kg =

The men's freestyle 57 kg is a competition featured at the 2017 Russian National Freestyle Wrestling Championships, and was held in Nazran, Ingushetia, Russia on June 13.

== Medalists ==
Gold	(Dagestan) Zaur Uguev
Silver	(Dagestan) Artem Gebekov
Bronze	(Tuva) Omak Syuryun
Bronze	(Yakutia) Dmitriy Aksenov

== Results ==
Legend

- F — Won by fall
- WO — Won by walkover (bye)

=== Finals ===
Final
(Dagestan) Artem Gebekov	1
(Dagestan) Zaur Uguev	3

=== Top half ===
==== Section 1 ====
Round of 32
(Kaliningrad) Ilyas Ibragimov	bey
(Dagestan) Magomedrasul Idrisov
(Dagestan) Said Gazimagomedov	bey
(Tuva) Omak Syuryun
(Dagestan) Ramiz Gamzatov	21
(Ingushetia) Mukhammat Kurskiev	11

Round of 16
(Moscow) Dzhabrail Gairbekov	2
(Tuva) Belek-ool Kuzheget-ool	8
(Dagestan) Artem Gebekov	4
(Dagestan) Hassanhussein Badrudinov	3
(North Ossetia–Alania) Azamat Tuskaev	3
(Dagestan) Magomedrasul Idrisov	5
(Tuva) Omak Syuryun	12
(Stavropol Krai) Ramiz Gamzatov	6

Quarterfinals
(Tuva) Belek-ool Kuzheget-ool	0
(Dagestan) Artem Gebekov	5
(Dagestan) Magomedrasul Idrisov	7
(Tuva) Omak Syuryun	11

Semifinals
(Dagestan) Artem Gebekov	9
(Tuva) Omak Syuryun	1

==== Section 2 ====
Round of 32
(Republic of Crimea (Russia)) Rasul Mashezov	3
(Chechnya) Adam-Giri Mezhidov	2
(Dagestan) Adam Ozdoabiev	3
(Moscow Oblast) Mikhail Ivanov	6
(Dagestan) Ramazan Ferzaliev	4
(Dagestan) Zaur Uguev	14
(Dagestan) Ismail Gadzhiev	0
(Yakutia) Aryaan Tyutrin	10
(Tuva) Donduk-ool Khuresh-ool	4^{F}
(Orenburg Oblast) Nikolay Matushkin	0
(Yakutia) Aital Zakharov	0
(Yakutia) Fedor Postnikov	6
(Saratov Oblast) Nasrudin Chalaev	0
(Saint Petersburg) Abdul-Vagab Shakhbanov	10
(Yakutia) Dmitriy Aksenov	12
(Leningrad Oblast) Arslan-Ali Kazavov	2

Round of 16
(Republic of Crimea (Russia)) Rasul Mashezov	2
(Moscow Oblast) Mikhail Ivanov	2
(Dagestan) Zaur Uguev	3
(Yakutia) Aryaan Tyutrin	0
(Tuva) Donduk-ool Khuresh-ool	4
(Yakutia) Fedor Postnikov	0
(Saint Petersburg) Abdul-Vagab Shakhbanov	1
(Yakutia) Dmitriy Aksenov	6

Quarterfinals
(Republic of Crimea (Russia)) Rasul Mashezov	0
(Dagestan) Zaur Uguev	10
(Tuva) Donduk-ool Khuresh-ool	1
(Yakutia) Dmitriy Aksenov	3

Semifinals
(Dagestan) Zaur Uguev	7
(Yakutia) Dmitriy Aksenov	1

=== Repechage ===
Repechage round 1
(Dagestan) Ramazan Ferzaliev	11
(Yakutia) Aryaan Tyutrin	1
-
-

Repechage round 2
(Dagestan) Ramazan Ferzaliev	6
(Republic of Crimea (Russia)) Rasul Mashezov	2
(Dagestan) Hassanhussein Badrudinov	5
(Tuva) Belek-ool Kuzheget-ool	1

Bronze medals
(Dagestan) Ramazan Ferzaliev	4
(Yakutia) Dmitriy Aksenov	9
(Dagestan) Hassanhussein Badrudinov	2
(Tuva) Omak Syuryun	2
