= 2017 Yasar Dogu Tournament =

Wrestling event held in Istanbul, Turkey on 10–12 July 2017

Yasar Dogu 2017
- Host city: Istanbul, Turkey
- Dates: 10–12 March
- Stadium: Bağcılar Olympic Sport Hall

Champions
- Freestyle: Turkey
- Women: Turkey

The 45th Yasar Dogu Tournament 2017, was a wrestling event held in Istanbul, Turkey between 10-12 July 2017.

This international tournament includes competition in both men's and women's freestyle wrestling. This ranking tournament was held in honor of the Olympic Champion, Yaşar Doğu.

== Medal table ==
* Host nation (Turkey)

Rank	Nation	Gold	Silver	Bronze	Total
1	Turkey*	7	4	12	23
2	Russia	4	5	11	20
3	Azerbaijan	2	1	0	3
4	Bulgaria	1	0	1	2
5	Greece	1	0	0	1
5	Kyrgyzstan	1	0	0	1
7	Kazakhstan	0	5	3	8
8	Armenia	0	1	1	2
9	Norway	0	0	1	1
9	Poland	0	0	1	1
9	Romania	0	0	1	1
Totals (11 entries)		16	16	31	63

== Team ranking ==
Rank	Men's freestyle		Women's freestyle	
Rank	Team	Points	Team	Points
1	Turkey	65	Turkey	70
2	Russia	58	Kazakhstan	67
3	Azerbaijan	35	Russia	59
4	Armenia	34	Bulgaria	18
5	Kyrgyzstan	17	Romania	14
6	Poland	14	Norway	11
7	Uzbekistan	13	Greece	10

== Medal overview ==
=== Men's freestyle ===
Event	Gold	Silver	Bronze
57 kg	Süleyman Atlı; Turkey	Mahir Amiraslanov; Azerbaijan	Zaur Uguev; Russia
57 kg	Süleyman Atlı; Turkey	Mahir Amiraslanov; Azerbaijan	Sezgin Pişmişoğlu; Turkey
61 kg	Galib Aliyev; Azerbaijan	Abdi Zurnacı; Turkey	Egor Ponomarev; Russia
61 kg	Galib Aliyev; Azerbaijan	Abdi Zurnacı; Turkey	Valodya Frangulyan; Armenia
65 kg	Mustafa Kaya; Turkey	Narek Sirunyan; Armenia	Selahattin Kılıçsallayan; Turkey
65 kg	Mustafa Kaya; Turkey	Narek Sirunyan; Armenia	Sefa Aksoy; Turkey
70 kg	Magomedkhabib Kadimagomedov; Russia	Ildus Giniyatullin; Russia	Zafer Dama; Turkey
70 kg	Magomedkhabib Kadimagomedov; Russia	Ildus Giniyatullin; Russia	Magomedrasul Gazimagomedov; Russia
74 kg	Muslim Evloev; Kyrgyzstan	Khetag Tsabolov; Russia	Khalil Aminov; Russia
74 kg	Muslim Evloev; Kyrgyzstan	Khetag Tsabolov; Russia	Artem Umarov; Russia
86 kg	Dauren Kurugliev; Russia	Selim Yaşar; Turkey	Fatih Erdin; Turkey
86 kg	Dauren Kurugliev; Russia	Selim Yaşar; Turkey	Ahmet Bilici; Turkey
97 kg	Aslanbek Alborov; Azerbaijan	Rıza Yıldırım; Turkey	Fatih Yaşarlı; Turkey
97 kg	Aslanbek Alborov; Azerbaijan	Rıza Yıldırım; Turkey	Şamil Erdoğan; Turkey
125 kg	Alan Khugaev; Russia	Bekir Eryücel; Turkey	Robert Baran; Poland
125 kg	Alan Khugaev; Russia	Bekir Eryücel; Turkey	Şakir Bozkurt; Turkey

=== Women's freestyle ===
Event	Gold	Silver	Bronze
48 kg	Milana Dadasheva; Russia	Irina Borissova; Kazakhstan	Evin Demirhan; Turkey
48 kg	Milana Dadasheva; Russia	Irina Borissova; Kazakhstan	Alina Moreva; Russia
53 kg	Maria Prevolaraki; Greece	Natalia Malysheva; Russia	Ksenia Nezgovorova; Russia
53 kg	Maria Prevolaraki; Greece	Natalia Malysheva; Russia	Zhuldyz Eshimova; Kazakhstan
55 kg	Bediha Gün; Turkey	Nina Menkenova; Russia	Marina Sedneva; Kazakhstan
55 kg	Bediha Gün; Turkey	Nina Menkenova; Russia	Alexandra Andreeva; Russia
58 kg	Derya Bayhan; Turkey	Kristina Eloeva; Russia	Ayşe Vatansever; Turkey
58 kg	Derya Bayhan; Turkey	Kristina Eloeva; Russia	Yulia Alborova; Russia
60 kg	Mimi Hristova; Bulgaria	Ayaulym Kassymova; Kazakhstan	Altynay Satylgan; Kazakhstan
60 kg	Mimi Hristova; Bulgaria	Ayaulym Kassymova; Kazakhstan	Lyubov Ovcharova; Russia
63 kg	Hafize Şahin; Turkey	Zarina Kunangarayeva; Kazakhstan	Taybe Yusein; Bulgaria
63 kg	Hafize Şahin; Turkey	Zarina Kunangarayeva; Kazakhstan	Sinem Topçu; Turkey
69 kg	Buse Tosun; Turkey	Zhamila Bakbergenova; Kazakhstan	Alexandra Anghel; Romania
75 kg	Yasemin Adar; Turkey	Gulmaral Yerkebayeva; Kazakhstan	Daria Shisterova; Russia
75 kg	Yasemin Adar; Turkey	Gulmaral Yerkebayeva; Kazakhstan	Signe Marie Store; Norway

== Participating nations ==
216 wrestlers from 16 countries:

1. Armenia (10)
2. Azerbaijan (5)
3. Belgium (1)
4. Bulgaria (2)
5. Greece (1)
6. Iraq (2)
7. Kazakhstan (17)
8. Kyrgyzstan (10)
9. Macedonia (3)
10. Norway (2)
11. Poland (4)
12. Romania (2)
13. Russia (32)
14. Tajikistan (1)
15. Turkey (117) (Host)
16. Uzbekistan (7)

== See also ==
- 2017 Vehbi Emre & Hamit Kaplan Tournament
