= 2017 European Wrestling Championships – Men's freestyle 57 kg =

The men's freestyle 57 kg is a competition featured at the 2017 European Wrestling Championships, and was held in Novi Sad, Serbia on May 2.

== Medalists ==
| Gold | Giorgi Edisherashvili; Azerbaijan |
| Silver | Andrei Dukov; Romania |
| Bronze | Zaur Uguev; Russia |
| Bronze | Süleyman Atlı; Turkey |

== Results ==
Legend

- F — Won by fall

=== Top half ===
==== Section 1 ====
Qualification
Mehmed Feraim (BUL) | 0
Zoheir El-Ouarraqe (FRA) | 5
Dzimchyk Rynchynau (BLR) | 0
Giorgi Edisherashvili (AZE) | 10
Alexandru Chirtoacă (MDA) | 2
Andriy Yatsenko (UKR) | 10
Zaur Uguev (RUS) | 5
Vladimir Egorov (MKD) | 3
Aleksandar Mančić (SRB) | 0
Andrei Dukov (ROU) | 10
Levan Metreveli (ESP) | 4
Givi Davidovi (ITA) | 3
Otari Gogava (GEO) | 0
Yuriy Holub (ISR) | 10
Garik Barseghyan (ARM) | 1
Süleyman Atlı (TUR) | 8

Quarterfinals
Zoheir El-Ouarraqe (FRA) | 3
Giorgi Edisherashvili (AZE) | 10
Andriy Yatsenko (UKR) | 0
Zaur Uguev (RUS) | 5^{F}
Andrei Dukov (ROU) | 7
Levan Metreveli (ESP) | 2
Yuriy Holub (ISR) | 5
Süleyman Atlı (TUR) | 10

Semifinals
Giorgi Edisherashvili (AZE) | 5
Zaur Uguev (RUS) | 1
Andrei Dukov (ROU) | 7
Süleyman Atlı (TUR) | 6

Final
Giorgi Edisherashvili (AZE) | 9
Andrei Dukov (ROU) | 0

=== Repechage ===
Repechage round 1
Dzimchyk Rynchynau (BLR) | 2
Zoheir El-Ouarraqe (FRA) | 3
Aleksandar Mančić (SRB) | 0
Levan Metreveli (ESP) | 10

Bronze medals
Zoheir El-Ouarraqe (FRA) | 1
Zaur Uguev (RUS) | 9
Levan Metreveli (ESP) | 1
Süleyman Atlı (TUR) | 11
