= Golden Grand Prix Ivan Yarygin 2018 – Men's freestyle 57 kg =

The men's freestyle 57 kg is a competition featured at the Golden Grand Prix Ivan Yarygin 2018, and was held in Krasnoyarsk, Russia on 26 January.

== Medalists ==
| Gold | (Dagestan) Zaur Uguev |
| Silver | (North Ossetia–Alania) Azamat Tuskaev |
| Bronze | (Tuva) Donduk-ool Khuresh-ool |
| Bronze | (Mongolia) Tsogbadrakh Tseveensuren |

== Results ==
Legend

- F — Won by fall
- WO — Won by walkover (forfeit)

=== Final ===
| Final |
| (Dagestan) Zaur Uguev | 4 |
| (North Ossetia–Alania) Azamat Tuskaev | 1 |

=== Top half ===
- qualification: Donduk-ool Khuresh-ool of Tuva def. Rasul Mashezov of Crimea (8-0)
- qualification: Azamat Tuskaev of RNO-Alania def. Semen Vladimirov of Yakutia by TF, (12-0)
- qualification: Azamat Tuskaev of RNO-Alania def. Tugs Batjargal of Mongolia by TF, (10-0)
- qualification: Baris Kaya of Turkey def. Sezgin Pismisoglu of Turkey (6–4)

==== Section 1 ====
Round of 8
(United States) Frank Perrelli | WO
(Kyrgyzstan) Islam Kineshov
(China) Minghu Liu | 1
(Turkey) Ahmet Peker | 1
(Mongolia) Tumentsogt Bold | 0
(Dagestan) Zaur Uguev | 8
(Tuva) Donduk-ool Khuresh-ool | 11
(Kazakhstan) Yernur Kabatayev | 0
(Mongolia) Tsogbadrakh Tseveensuren | 12
(Kyrgyzstan) Khurshid Parpiev | 1
(Kazakhstan) Kuralbek Omarbekov | 2
(Turkmenistan) Meretmuhammet Atayev | 10
(Uzbekistan) Jahongirmirza Turobov | 3
(Cuba) Blanco Alvarez | 7
(North Ossetia–Alania) Azamat Tuskaev | 8
(Turkey) Baris Kaya | 1

Quarterfinals
(United States) Frank Perrelli | 3
(China) Minghu Liu | 3
(Dagestan) Zaur Uguev | 6
(Tuva) Donduk-ool Khuresh-ool | 3
(Mongolia) Tsogbadrakh Tseveensuren | 10
(Turkmenistan) Meretmuhammet Atayev | 0
(Cuba) Blanco Alvarez | 1
(North Ossetia–Alania) Azamat Tuskaev | 4

Semifinals
(United States) Frank Perrelli | 3
(Dagestan) Zaur Uguev | 8
(Mongolia) Tsogbadrakh Tseveensuren | 0
(North Ossetia–Alania) Azamat Tuskaev | 7

Final

== Repechage ==
Repechage round 1
-
-
(Mongolia) Tugs Batjargal | 0
(Turkey) Baris Kaya | 10

Repechage round 2
(Mongolia) Tumentsogt Bold | 0
(Tuva) Donduk-ool Khuresh-ool | 10
(Turkey) Baris Kaya | 4
(Cuba) Blanco Alvarez | 1

Bronze medals
(Tuva) Donduk-ool Khuresh-ool | 5
(United States) Frank Perrelli | 3
(Turkey) Baris Kaya | 1
(Mongolia) Tseveensürengiin Tsogbadrakh | 5
