= Ulukbek Zholdoshbekov =

Kyrgyzstan freestyle wrestler

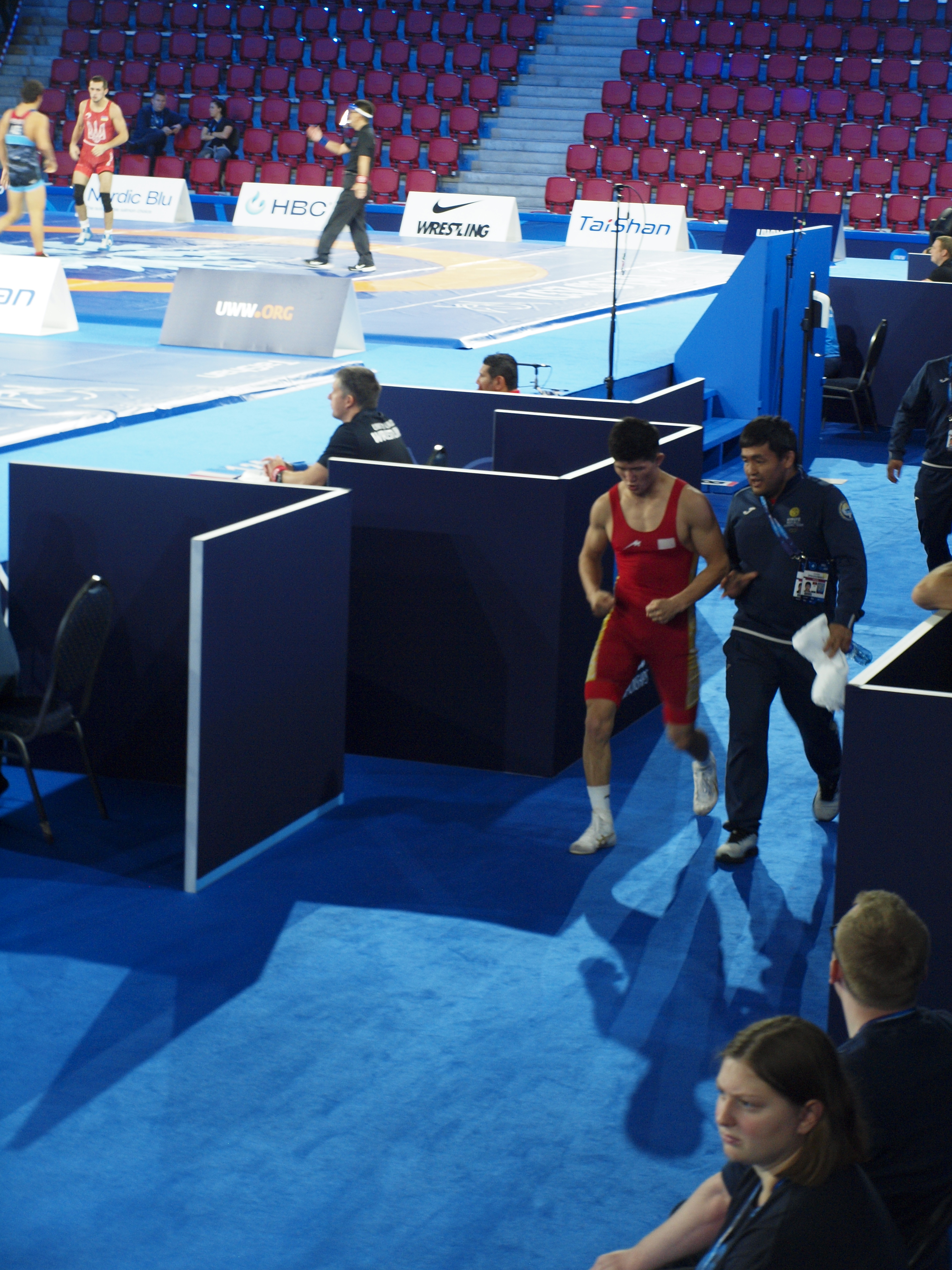
- 2021 World Wrestling Championships

Personal information
- Native name: Улукбек Жолдошбекович Жолдошбеков
- Full name: Ulukbek Joldoshbekovich Joldoshbekov
- Nationality: Kyrgyzstan
- Born: 9 February 1996 (age 30) Naryn, Kyrgyzstan
- Height: 168 cm (5 ft 6 in)

Sport
- Country: Kyrgyzstan
- Sport: Amateur wrestling
- Weight class: 61 kg
- Event: Freestyle
Medal record
Men's freestyle wrestling
Representing Kyrgyzstan
Asian Championships
Gold medal – first place	2020 New Delhi	61 kg
Bronze medal – third place	2016 Bangkok	57 kg
Bronze medal – third place	2018 Bishkek	61 kg
Bronze medal – third place	2022 Ulaanbaatar	61 kg
Bronze medal – third place	2023 Astana	65 kg
Bronze medal – third place	2024 Bishkek	65 kg
Yasar Dogu Tournament
Gold medal – first place	2024 Antalya	65 kg
Bronze medal – third place	2022 Istanbul	61 kg
Bronze medal – third place	2021 Istanbul	61 kg
Ali Aliyev Tournament
Bronze medal – third place	2016 Makhachkala	57 kg
World U23 Championships
Gold medal – first place	2019 Budapest	61 kg
Asian U23 Championships
Gold medal – first place	2019 Ulaanbaatar	61 kg
World University Championships
Bronze medal – third place	2016 Çorum	57 kg
Asian Junior Championships
Gold medal – first place	2014 Ulaanbaatar	55 kg
Asian Cadet Championships
Gold medal – first place	2012 Bishkek	50 kg
Bronze medal – third place	2013 Ulaanbaatar	54 kg

Ulukbek Zholdoshbekov (born 9 February 1996) is a Kyrgyzstani freestyle wrestler. He won the gold medal in the 61 kg event at the 2020 Asian Wrestling Championships held in New Delhi, India.

== Career ==
At the 2016 Asian Wrestling Championships held in Bangkok, Thailand, he won one of the bronze medals in the men's 57 kg event. In the same year, he also competed in the first qualification tournament hoping to qualify for the 2016 Summer Olympics in Rio de Janeiro, Brazil. His efforts were unsuccessful as he was eliminated in his third match in the tournament, against Sandeep Tomar of India. In that same year, he won one of the bronze medals in the men's 57 kg event at the 2016 World University Wrestling Championships held in Çorum, Turkey.

In 2017, Zholdoshbekov was eliminated in his first match in the 57 kg event at the World Wrestling Championships held in Paris, France. A month later, he was eliminated in his second match in the men's 57 kg event at the Asian Indoor and Martial Arts Games held in Ashgabat, Turkmenistan.

In 2019, Zholdoshbekov won the gold medal in the 61 kg event at the Asian U23 Wrestling Championship held in Ulaanbaatar, Mongolia. He also won the gold medal in the 61 kg event at the 2019 World U23 Wrestling Championship in Budapest, Hungary. In the same year, he also competed in the men's freestyle 57 kg event at the 2019 World Wrestling Championships in Nur-Sultan, Kazakhstan where he was eliminated in his first match by Mahir Amiraslanov of Azerbaijan.

In 2022, he won one of the bronze medals in his event at the Yasar Dogu Tournament held in Istanbul, Turkey. Zholdoshbekov competed in the 61 kg event at the 2022 World Wrestling Championships held in Belgrade, Serbia.

== Achievements ==
Year	Tournament	Location	Result	Event
2016	Asian Championships	Bangkok, Thailand	3rd	Freestyle 57 kg
2016	World University Wrestling Championships	Çorum, Turkey	3rd	Freestyle 57 kg
2018	Asian Championships	Bishkek, Kyrgyzstan	3rd	Freestyle 61 kg
2020	Asian Championships	New Delhi, India	1st	Freestyle 61 kg
2022	Asian Championships	Ulaanbaatar, Mongolia	3rd	Freestyle 61 kg
2023	Asian Championships	Astana, Kazakhstan	3rd	Freestyle 65 kg
