= Reza Atri =

Iranian freestyle wrestler

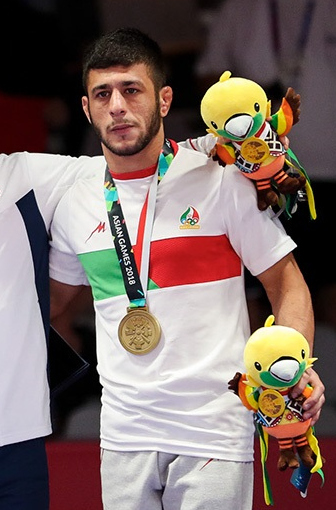
- Atri at the 2018 Asian Games

Personal information
- Full name: Reza Atri Nagharchi
- Nationality: Iran
- Born: رضا اطری نقارچی; 8 August 1994 (age 32) Tehran, Iran
- Home town: Babol, Iran
- Height: 1.63 m (5 ft 4 in)

Sport
- Country: Iran
- Sport: Amateur wrestling
- Weight class: 57-61 kg
- Event: Freestyle
- Club: Wrestling Club, Babol
- Coached by: Mahmoud Hassannia

Achievements and titles
- Olympic finals: 5th (2020)
- World finals: 5th (2019) (silver) (2022)
- Regional finals: (bronze) (2017) (bronze) (2018) (gold) (2019)
Medal record
Men's freestyle wrestling
Representing Iran
World Championships
Silver medal – second place	2022 Belgrade	61 kg
Asian Games
Bronze medal – third place	2018 Jakarta	57 kg
Asian Championships
Gold medal – first place	2019 Xi'an	57 kg
Bronze medal – third place	2017 New Delhi	57 kg
Military World Games
Bronze medal – third place	2015 Mungyeong	57 kg

Reza Atri Nagharchi (Persian: رضا اطری نقارچی, born 8 August 1994 in Tehran) is an Iranian freestyle wrestler. He won the silver medal in the 61 kg event at the 2022 World Wrestling Championships held in Belgrade, Serbia. He won a gold medal at the 2019 Asian Championships, and bronze medals at the 2017 Asian Championships and 2018 Asian Games.

== Career ==
Atri began his professional career with a silver medal at the Junior Asian Championship, 2014 in the 55 kg division. Moving up to the senior level, Atri achieved a bronze medal at the 2015 Military World Games. In the following year, Atri earned two gold medals in the Aleksandr Medved's Prizes with wins over Batamunkuyeu Dzimchyk, World multimedalist and 2013 World Cup champion Sezar Akgül, Zelimkhan Abakarov, Nodar Arabidze, and the Paris Grand Prix. At the 2017 Asian Wrestling Championships, Atri was awarded a bronze medal after defeating his opponent from South Korea. At the 2018 Asian games, Atri wrestled in the 57 kg division and won a bronze medal after defeating Bhagawati Sah Teli, Sandeep Tomar, and Kim Sung-gwon. A year after, Atri won a gold medal at the 2019 Asian Wrestling Championships after defeating Kang Kum-song in the final match. In the same year, Atri secured the fifth place in the World Championships and qualified for the 2020 Summer Olympics. At the 2020 Summer Olympics, Atri won against Süleyman Atlı and Erdenebatyn Bekhbayar and proceeded to the semifinal, but then lost to Zaur Uguev. He didn't advance to the final match and ended up tied fifth.

On 18 September 2022, he competed at the 2022 World Wrestling Championships in the 61 kg division and won a silver medal. He won four matches by defeating Besir Alili, Islam Bazarganov, Georgi Vangelov, and Narmandakhyn Narankhüü. However, Atri lost the final match to the Japanese wrestler Rei Higuchi.

== Achievements ==
- World Championships – (silver) 2022
- World Cup – (gold) 2016
- Asian Championships – (bronze) 2017, (gold) 2019
- Asian Games – (bronze) 2018
- Paris Tournament – (gold) 2016
- Aleksandr Medved's Prizes – (gold) 2016
- Military World Games – (bronze) 2015
- Asian Junior Championship – (silver) 2014
