= 2025 European Wrestling Championships – Men's freestyle 61 kg =

Wrestling competition

Men's freestyle 61 kg at the 2025 European Wrestling Championships
- Venue: X-Bionic Sphere
- Location: Bratislava, Slovakia
- Dates: 8-9 April
- Competitors: 13

Medalists
gold medal	Zaur Uguev
silver medal	Arsen Harutyunyan	Armenia
bronze medal	Zelimkhan Abakarov	Albania
bronze medal	Andrii Dzhelep	Ukraine

The men's freestyle 61 kg is a competition featured at the 2025 European Wrestling Championships, and was held in Bratislava, Slovakia on April 8 and 9.

== Results ==
Legend

- F — Won by fall

=== Main bracket ===
Round of 16
Nils Leutert (SUI)	0
Zelimkhan Abakarov (ALB)	10
Stilyan Iliev (BUL)	0
Arsen Harutyunyan (ARM)	11
Emrah Ormanoğlu (TUR)	4
Leonid Colesnic (MDA)	6
Róbert Meszároš (SVK)	0
Dzmitry Shamela (UWW)	10
Andrii Dzhelep (UKR)	10
Besir Alili (MKD)	0

Quarterfinals
Nuraddin Novruzov (AZE)	2
Zelimkhan Abakarov (ALB)	11
Arsen Harutyunyan (ARM)	12
Leonid Colesnic (MDA)	2
Giorgi Goniashvili (GEO)	8
Dzmitry Shamela (UWW)	12
Andrii Dzhelep (UKR)	1
Zaur Uguev (UWW)	11

Semifinals
Zelimkhan Abakarov (ALB)	2
Arsen Harutyunyan (ARM)	5
Dzmitry Shamela (UWW)	0
Zaur Uguev (UWW)	10

Final
Arsen Harutyunyan (ARM)	5
Zaur Uguev (UWW)	7

=== Repechage ===
Repechage round 1
Stilyan Iliev (BUL)	0
Leonid Colesnic (MDA)	10

Bronze medal match
Leonid Colesnic (MDA)	0
Zelimkhan Abakarov (ALB)	11
Andrii Dzhelep (UKR)	3
Dzmitry Shamela (UWW)	1

== Final standing ==
Rank	Athlete
1st place, gold medalist(s)	Zaur Uguev (UWW)
2nd place, silver medalist(s)	Arsen Harutyunyan (ARM)
3rd place, bronze medalist(s)	Zelimkhan Abakarov (ALB)
3rd place, bronze medalist(s)	Andrii Dzhelep (UKR)
5	Leonid Colesnic (MDA)
5	Dzmitry Shamela (UWW)
7	Giorgi Goniashvili (GEO)
8	Emrah Ormanoğlu (TUR)
9	Nuraddin Novruzov (AZE)
10	Nils Leutert (SUI)
11	Róbert Meszároš (SVK)
12	Besir Alili (MKD)
13	Stilyan Iliev (BUL)
