= Azamat Tuskaev =

Russian freestyle wrestler (born 1994)

Azamat Tuskaev Азамат Тускаев
Personal information
- Native name: Азамат Артурович Тускаев
- Full name: Azamat Arturovich Tuskaev
- Nationality: Russian
- Born: 21 January 1994 (age 32) Chikola, Russia
- Height: 160 cm (5 ft 3 in)

Sport
- Country: Russia (2010–2022); Serbia (2024–present)
- Sport: Wrestling
- Weight class: 57 kg
- Rank: International Master of Sport in Freestyle wrestling
- Event: Freestyle
- Coached by: A. Makoev, A. Margiev

Achievements and titles
- Regional finals: (gold) (2020)
Medal record
Men's freestyle wrestling
Representing Serbia
European Championships
Silver medal – second place	2025 Bratislava	57 kg
Grand Prix
Bronze medal – third place	2025 Zagreb	57 kg
Representing Russia
World Cup
Silver medal – second place	2016 Los Angeles	57 kg
European Championships
Gold medal – first place	2020 Rome	57 kg
World Military Championships
Gold medal – first place	2021 Tehran	57 kg
Bronze medal – third place	2016 Skopje	57 kg
Bronze medal – third place	2018 Moscow	57 kg
Bronze medal – third place	2023 Baku	61 kg
European U23 Championships
Silver medal – second place	2017 Szombathely	57 kg
U20 World Championships
Gold medal – first place	2014 Zagreb	55 kg
European Cadets Championships
Gold medal – first place	2010 Sarajevo	50 kg
Representing (North Ossetia–Alania) North Ossetia
Russian National Championships
Silver medal – second place	2020 Naro-Fominsk	57 kg
Bronze medal – third place	2021Ulan-Ude	57 kg
Bronze medal – third place	2015 Kaspiysk	57 kg
Bronze medal – third place	2013 Krasnoyarsk	55 kg
Golden Grand Prix Ivan Yarygin
Gold medal – first place	2020 Krasnoyarsk	57 kg
Silver medal – second place	2018 Krasnoyarsk	57 kg
Bronze medal – third place	2023 Krasnoyarsk	57 kg
Bronze medal – third place	2022 Krasnoyarsk	57 kg

Azamat Arturovich Tuskaev (Russian: Тускаев, Азамат Артурович; born 21 January 1994), is a Russian freestyle wrestler of Ossetian descent. Tuskaev won his first Ivan Yarygin Gran Prix in 2020, which allowed him to enter the 2020 European Wrestling Championships held in Rome, Italy. Tuskaev would wrestle at 57 kg and also win the gold medal - controlling and mostly dominating former European-champion and World Silver medalist Atli in the process.

== Early life ==
Tuskaev originally wanted to become a professional football player; although, his dad took Tuskaev to start wrestling in his home of Chikola, seeing as Khadzhimurat Gatsalov, Boris Makoev and Amiran Kardanov had all started their wrestling careers in Chikola. Thus began Tuskaev's career, where he has wrestled in tournaments such as: European Championships, Sassari Ranking Series Tournament; World Cup; Russian National Championships and the Alania tournament.
