= Stevan Mićić =

Serbian freestyle professional wrestler

Personal information
- Full name: Stevan Andrija Mićić
- Nationality: United States, Serbia
- Born: Стеван Андрија Мићић; 4 April 1996 (age 30) Mesa, Arizona, U.S.
- Home town: Cedar Lake, Indiana, U.S.
- Agent: Ruby Sports & Entertainment
- Height: 1.70 m (5 ft 7 in)
- Weight: 57 kg (126 lb)

Sport
- Country: United States; Serbia
- Sport: Wrestling
- Events: Freestyle and Folkstyle
- College team: Michigan
- Club: Chicago Galaxy International Wrestling Club

Achievements and titles
- World finals: (gold) (2023)
- Regional finals: (silver) (2019)
Medal record
Men's freestyle wrestling
Representing Serbia
World Championships
Gold medal – first place	2023 Belgrade	57 kg
Bronze medal – third place	2022 Belgrade	57 kg
European Games
Silver medal – second place	2019 Minsk	57 kg
European Championships
Bronze medal – third place	2018 Kaspiysk	57 kg
Bronze medal – third place	2020 Roma	57 kg
Mediterranean Games
Bronze medal – third place	2018 Tarragona	65 kg
Bronze medal – third place	2022 Oran	65 kg
Waclaw Ziolkowski Memorial
Gold medal – first place	2021 Warsaw	57 kg
Representing United States
World Juniors Championships
Bronze medal – third place	2015 Salvador da Bahia	55 kg
Collegiate Wrestling
Representing the Michigan Wolverines
NCAA Division I Championships
Silver medal – second place	2018 Cleveland	133 lb
Bronze medal – third place	2019 Pittsburgh	133 lb
Big Ten Championships
Gold medal – first place	2018 East Lansing	133 lb
Bronze medal – third place	2017 Bloomington	133 lb

Stevan Andrija Mićić (Serbian Cyrillic: Стеван Андрија Мићић; born 4 April 1996) is a Serbian-American wrestler who competes at 57 kilograms (125 pounds). He won a gold medal in freestyle wrestling at the 2023 World Wrestling Championships in Belgrade, Serbia. He is the first wrestler representing Serbia to win a medal in men's freestyle wrestling at the World Wrestling Championships.

He has also claimed two bronze medals at the European Championships (2018 and 2020), a silver medal at the 2019 European Games, and bronze medals at the Mediterranean Games (2018 and 2022) while representing Serbia. In collegiate wrestling, he is a three-time NCAA Division I All-American and was the 2018 Big Ten Conference champion for the Michigan Wolverines.

== Biography ==
=== Background ===
Stevan Mićić was born on April 4, 1996, in Mesa, Arizona, United States, to parents Stevan and Lori Mićić. In his early years, Stevan grew up in Northwest Indiana within the Serbian culture, an area within the Chicago metropolitan area, which has one of the largest Serbian populations outside of Serbia.

=== High school ===
Stevan graduated from Hanover Central High School in Cedar Lake, Indiana in 2014. He was named the 2014 Indiana state recipient of the Dave Schultz High School Excellence Award. He is a three-time Indiana state champion, winning at 126 pounds (2014), 113 pounds (2013), and 106 pounds (2012) and finishing third at 103 pounds as a freshman (2011). Stevan graduated with a career prep record of 184-5, including a perfect 141-0 over his final three seasons. He was ranked as the nation's No. 19 overall recruit by InterMat and No. 1-ranked 126-pound wrestler.

=== College career ===
He was a student at the University of Michigan and runner-up at the NCAA national championships in 2018.

At the end of 2018, he had a collegiate wrestling record 74 wins and 13 defeats. At the 2019 NCAA national championships in the quarterfinal, he beat Iowa wrestler Austin DeSanto 3-2.

For the 2019–20 season, Mićić did not compete after qualifying for the Olympics through his finish at the 2019 World Championships, utilizing an Olympic redshirt. He planned to return in 2021 with one year of eligibility remaining, despite not competing during regular season, but pulled out of the 2021 NCAA Championships due to an injury.

He earned a bachelor's degree in sociology and a master's degree in sports management from the University of Michigan.

=== International career ===
Mićić wrestled for the United States at junior levels, winning a bronze medal at 55 kg at the 2015 Junior World Championships in Salvador, Brazil. From 2018, he started to represent Serbia at senior levels. Mićić holds dual citizenship and chose to compete for the birth country of his father. He participated in the 2018 European Wrestling Championships, held in Kaspiysk, Dagestan, Russia where he lost to Zaur Uguev of Russia, but won a bronze medal after defeating Levan Vartanov of Spain. The bronze medal was also Serbia's first European medal in freestyle wrestling. Later at the 2018 Mediterranean Games in Tarragona, Spain, Mićić took another bronze medal at 65 kg. At the 2019 European Games, he won a silver medal, defeating world No.1 Süleyman Atlı of Turkey and U23 world bronze medallist Taras Markovych of Ukraine en route.

Mićić qualified for the 2020 Summer Olympics by finishing fifth at the 2019 World Wrestling Championships in Kazakhstan, where he lost 5–4 in the quarterfinal against Süleyman Atlı and lost 4–3 in a bronze-medal match against the host country's Nurislam Sanayev. However, winning the 2021 Poland Open Ranking Series event helped Mićić to be the top seed at the Tokyo Olympics, though he would not medal.

He won a bronze medal at 65 kg at the 2022 Mediterranean Games in Oran, Algeria. He also won a bronze medal at 57 kg at the 2022 World Wrestling Championships in Belgrade, Serbia.

At the 2023 World Wrestling Championships, again in Belgrade, Micic went 5-0 to win the gold medal at 57 kg. To win the gold, he defeated three former world champions: 2018 and 2019 World/2020 Olympic 57 kg gold medalist Zaur Uguev in the quarterfinals, 2022 57 kg champion Zelimkhan Abakarov in the semifinals, and 2022 61 kg champion Rei Higuchi in the finals. This was Serbia's first senior-level gold medal in men's freestyle wrestling.
