= Giorgi Edisherashvili =

Georgian freestyle wrestler

Giorgi Edisherashvili გიორგი ედიშერაშვილი
Personal information
- Nationality: Georgian-Azerbaijani
- Born: 17 March 1988 (age 38) Tbilisi, Georgian SSR, Soviet Union
- Weight: 57 kg (126 lb)

Sport
- Sport: Wrestling
- Event: Freestyle
- Coached by: Firdovsi Umudov
Medal record
Representing Azerbaijan
European Championships
Gold medal – first place	2017 Novi Sad	57 kg
Gold medal – first place	2018 Kaspiysk	57 kg
Representing Georgia
European Championships
Gold medal – first place	2013 Tbilisi	55 kg

Giorgi Edisherashvili (Georgian: გიორგი ედიშერაშვილი; Azerbaijani: Georgi Edişeraşvili; born 17 March 1988) is a wrestler from Georgia who has wrestled for both: Georgia and Azerbaijan. Edisherashvili is a three-time European Wrestling Championships champion. In 2016, Edisherashvili was granted a sport citizenship of Azerbaijan, thus allowing him to compete and wrestle under Azerbaijan. He made his debut at the 2016 Yasar Dogu memorial tournament held in Istanbul, Turkey.

== Wrestling career ==
Edisherashvili won his first European title in his hometown of Tbilisi, Georgia at the 2013 European Wrestling Championships whilst representing Georgia. Edisherashvili wrestled in the 55 kg weight category and defeated four-time European Wrestling Championships medalist and Belarusian-Yakut wrestler, Vladislav Andreev by winning both the second and third periods of the match in the final, to win the gold medal and capture first place.

In Edisherashvili's second European Championship, he represented Azerbaijan in the 57 kg category at Novi Sad 2017, in Serbia. In the first round, he faced Dzimchyk Rynchynau of Belarus by 10-0 tech fall, he then beat French wrestler Zoheir El-Quarraqe by 10-3 decision in the quarter-final, and in the semi-final he beat Russian Zaur Uguev by 5–1. In the final he faced Romania's Andrei Dukov by a 9–0 score, winning his second European title.

Edisherashvili wrestled and took first place at the "Outstanding Ukrainian Wrestlers and Coaches Memorial" in Kyiv, Ukraine in February 2018. This result gained him entry to the 2018 European Wrestling Championships.

In April 2018, Edisherashvili wrestled for his third European title in Kaspiysk, Dagestan. In the first round, Edisherashvili defeated Bulgarian wrestler Mikyay Naim by 10-0 tech fall. He next faced Mihran Jaburyan of Armenia in the quarter-finals whom he defeated by another 10-0 tech fall. In the semi-finals Edisherashvili met with Belarusian wrestler Uladzislau Andreyeu and defeated him by 4-1 points. In the final, Edisherashvili met with former foe, Zaur Uguev and stunned the hometown favorite by a stunning lateral drop in the last 10 seconds - in a match he was losing 3–0, to winning it by a score of 4–3. Tedeev challenged the technique, and ultimately lost the challenge, thus giving an extra point to Edisherashvili making it 5-3 and giving him his third European title.
