= Nurislam Sanayev =

Kazakh freestyle wrestler

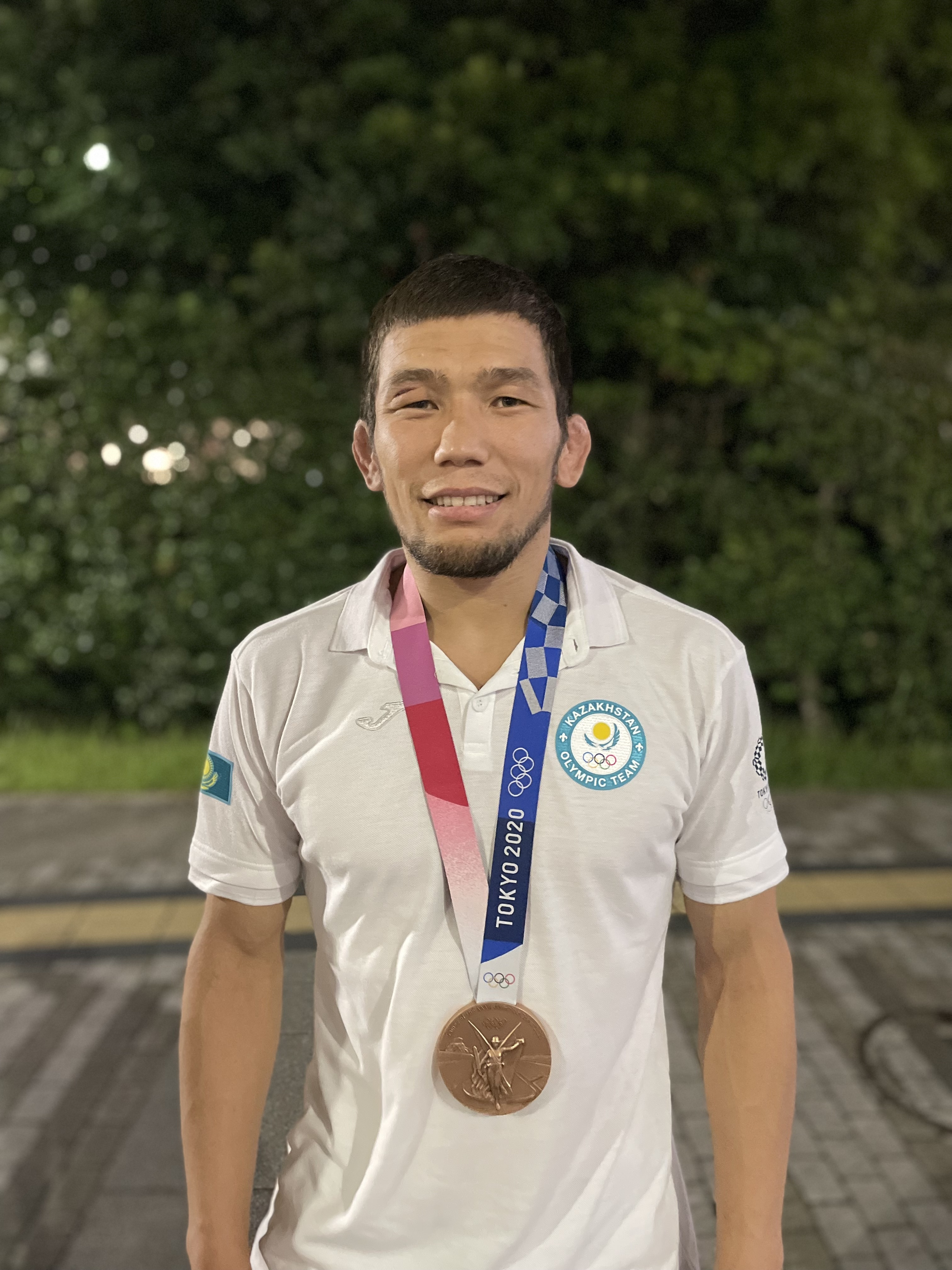
- Sanayev in 2021

Personal information
- Native name: Нурислам Валентинович Санаев
- Full name: Nurislam Valentinovich Sanaev
- Nationality: Kazakhstan
- Born: 9 February 1991 (age 35) Chadan, Tuvan ASSR, Russian SFSR, Soviet Union
- Height: 168 cm (5 ft 6 in)

Sport
- Country: Russia; Kazakhstan (since 2014)
- Sport: Wrestling
- Weight class: 57 kg
- Event: Freestyle
Medal record
Men's freestyle wrestling
Representing Kazakhstan
Olympic Games
Bronze medal – third place	2020 Tokyo	57 kg
World Championships
Silver medal – second place	2018 Budapest	57 kg
Bronze medal – third place	2019 Nur-Sultan	57 kg
Asian Championships
Gold medal – first place	2018 Bishkek	61 kg
Bronze medal – third place	2017 New Delhi	57 kg
Ali Aliyev Tournament
Bronze medal – third place	2015 Kaspisk	57 kg
Matteo Pellicone Ranking Series
Gold medal – first place	2021 Rome	57 kg
Dan Kolov & Nikola Petrov Tournament
Gold medal – first place	2019 Russe	61 kg
Gold medal – first place	2021 Plovdiv	61 kg
Waclaw Ziolkowski Memorial
Bronze medal – third place	2021 Warsaw	61 kg
Representing Russia
Golden Grand Prix Ivan Yarygin
Bronze medal – third place	2012 Krasnoyarsk	55 kg
Golden Grand Prix Baku
Bronze medal – third place	2012 Baku	55 kg

Nurislam Sanayev (Russian: Нурислам Валентинович Санаев; born 9 February 1991, in the Tuvan ASSR, Soviet Union) is a Russian-born Kazakhstani freestyle wrestler of Tuva heritage. He represented Kazakhstan at the 2020 Summer Olympics in the men's freestyle 57 kg event. He lost in the semi-finals and he then won his bronze medal match against Georgi Vangelov of Bulgaria.

Earlier, he competed in the men's freestyle 57 kg event at the 2016 Summer Olympics, in which he got eliminated in the repechage. In 2021, he won the gold medal in the 57 kg event at the Matteo Pellicone Ranking Series 2021 held in Rome, Italy.

== Personal life ==
In 2016, before the summer Olympic Games in Rio de Janeiro, Sanayev converted to Islam and changed his name from Artas Valentinovich Sanaa to Nurislam Sanayev.

Nurislam is a father, he has two sons.

Nurislam Sanayev also studied law at Al-Farabi Kazakh National University in Almaty.

== Controversy ==
In the 2020 Tokyo Olympics, Sanayev bit his Indian opponent in the semi-final match. Bite marks were seen on Indian opponent Ravi Dahiya at the end of the game.
