= Andrei Dukov =

Romanian freestyle wrestler

Sport
- Country: Romania
- Sport: Amateur wrestling
- Weight class: 57 kg
- Event: Freestyle
Medal record
Men's freestyle wrestling
Representing Romania
European Championships
| Silver medal – second place | 2017 Novi Sad | 57 kg |
| Bronze medal – third place | 2016 Riga | 57 kg |
Military World Games
| Silver medal – second place | 2019 Wuhan | 57 kg |

Andrei Dukov is a Romanian freestyle wrestler. He won one of the bronze medals in the men's freestyle 57 kg event at the 2016 European Wrestling Championships held in Riga, Latvia.

A year later, he won the silver medal in this event at the 2017 European Wrestling Championships held in Novi Sad, Serbia.

In 2019, he represented Romania at the Military World Games held in Wuhan, China and he won the silver medal in the 57 kg event.

== Achievements ==
| Year | Tournament | Location | Result | Event |
|---|---|---|---|---|
| 2016 | European Championships | Riga, Latvia | 3rd | Freestyle 57 kg |
| 2017 | European Championships | Novi Sad, Serbia | 2nd | Freestyle 57 kg |
| 2019 | Military World Games | Wuhan, China | 2nd | Freestyle 57 kg |
