= Mahir Amiraslanov =

Azerbaijani freestyle wrestler

Personal information
- Full name: Mahir Əmiraslanov
- Nationality: (Azerbaijan) Azerbaijanian
- Born: 12 May 1997 (age 29) Gazakh, Azerbaijan
- Height: 165 cm (5 ft 5 in)
- Weight: 57 kg (126 lb)

Sport
- Sport: Sport wrestling
- Event: Freestyle
- Coached by: Askerkhan Novruzov
Medal record
Men's Freestyle Wrestling
Representing Azerbaijan
European Games
Gold medal – first place	2019 Minsk	57 kg
European Championships
Bronze medal – third place	2019 Bucharest	57 kg
Islamic Solidarity Games
Gold medal – first place	2017 Baku	57 kg
World Cup
Bronze medal – third place	2017 Kermanshah	57 kg
Ali Aliyev Memorial
Gold medal – first place	2017 Kaspisk	57 kg
Yasar Dogu Tournament
Bronze medal – third place	2016 Istanbul	57 kg
Silver medal – second place	2017 Istanbul	57 kg
Baku Golden Grand Prix
Bronze medal – third place	2015 Baku	57 kg
World Junior Championships
Gold medal – first place	2015 Salvador, Bahia	55 kg
European Junior Championships
Bronze medal – third place	2016 Bucharest	55 kg
World Cadet Championships
Silver medal – second place	2013 Zrenjanin	50 kg
Silver medal – second place	2014 Snina	58 kg
European Cadet Championships
Bronze medal – third place	2013 Bar, Montenegro	50 kg

Mahir Amiraslanov (Azerbaijani: Mahir Əmiraslanov, born 12 May 1997) is an Azerbaijani freestyle wrestler. He competed at the 57 kg in the 2019 European Games and won the gold medal - Mahir Amiraslanov beat the 2018 World Champion Zaur Uguev of Russia 3–2 in the semifinal round and defeated Stevan Mićić of Serbia 9–1 in the final round. Amiraslanov has also claimed gold medal at the 4th Islamic Solidarity Games in Baku.
