= Süleyman Atlı =

Turkish freestyle wrestler (born 1994)

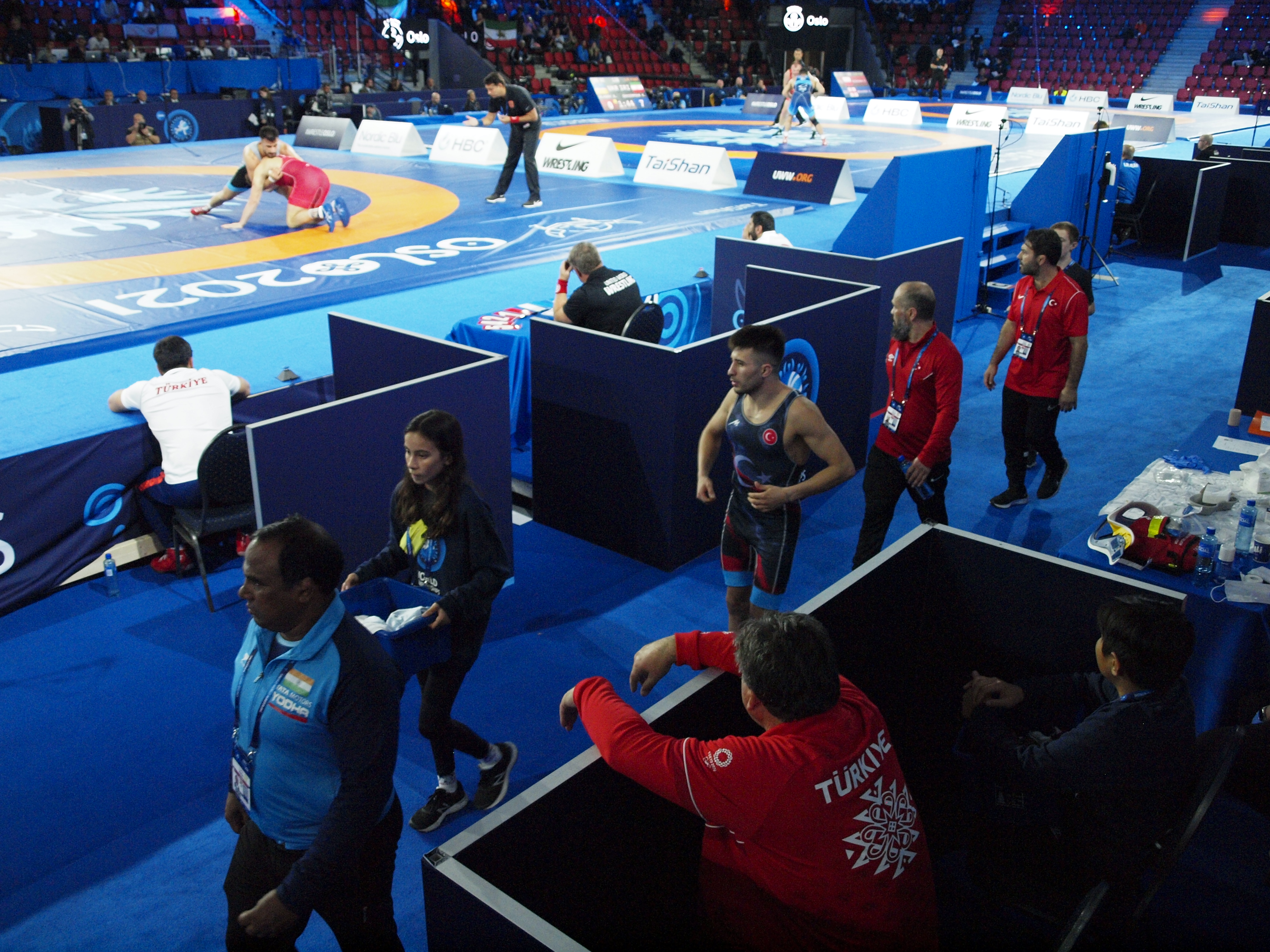
- Atlı at the World Wrestling Championships 2021

Personal information
- Native name: Süleyman Recep Atlı
- Nationality: Turkish
- Born: 27 July 1994 (age 32) Fethiye, Turkey
- Height: 1.67 m (5 ft 6 in)

Sport
- Country: Turkey
- Sport: Wrestling
- Weight class: 61 kg
- Event: Freestyle
- Club: Ankara ASKI
- Coached by: Yüksel Şanlı
Medal record
Men's freestyle wrestling
Representing Turkey
World Championships
Silver medal – second place	2019 Nur-Sultan	57 kg
Bronze medal – third place	2018 Budapest	57 kg
European Championships
Gold medal – first place	2019 Bucharest	57 kg
Gold medal – first place	2021 Warsaw	57 kg
Silver medal – second place	2020 Roma	57 kg
Silver medal – second place	2022 Budapest	61 kg
Silver medal – second place	2023 Zagreb	57 kg
Bronze medal – third place	2017 Novi Sad	57 kg
European Games
Bronze medal – third place	2019 Minsk	57 kg
Olympic Qualification Tournament
Gold medal – first place	2016 Istanbul	57 kg
Yasar Dogu Tournament
Gold medal – first place	2016 Istanbul	57 kg
Gold medal – first place	2017 Istanbul	57 kg
Bronze medal – third place	2018 Istanbul	57 kg
Dan Kolov - Nikola Petrov Tournament
Silver medal – second place	2019 Ruse	57 kg
Grand Prix
Gold medal – first place	2018 Tbilisi	57 kg
Gold medal – first place	2023 Alexandria	57 kg
Silver medal – second place	2021 Rome	61 kg
Bronze medal – third place	2022 Tunis	61 kg
World U23 Championships
Bronze medal – third place	2017 Bydgoszcz	57 kg
European U23 Championships
Gold medal – first place	2017 Szombathely	57 kg
World Juniors Championships
Gold medal – first place	2013 Sofia	50 kg
European Juniors Championships
Gold medal – first place	2013 Skopje	50 kg

Süleyman Atlı (born 27 July 1994 in Fethiye) is a Turkish freestyle wrestler competing in the 61 kg division. He is a member of Ankara ASKI.

== Career ==
He won the gold medal in the 57 kg event at the 2016 Yasar Dogu Tournament held in Istanbul, Turkey - Süleyman Atli defeated the multiple European champion Giorgi Edisherashvili of Azerbaijan by technical pinfall in the semifinal, and beat Tsogtbaatar Damdinbazar of Mongolia by points in the final.

He earned a quota spot for the 2016 Summer Olympics with his first-place performance at the 2016 World Wrestling Olympic Qualification Tournament 2 held in Istanbul, Turkey.

Atlı became bronze medalist at the 2017 European Wrestling Championships in Novi Sad, Serbia. In 2021, he won the silver medal in the 61 kg event at the Matteo Pellicone Ranking Series 2021 held in Rome, Italy.

He won the silver medal in the 61 kg event at the 2022 European Wrestling Championships held in Budapest, Hungary. He competed in the 61 kg event at the 2022 World Wrestling Championships held in Belgrade, Serbia.

In 2023, he won the silver in the men's 57 kg event at the 2023 European Wrestling Championships held in Zagreb, Croatia. Starting the championship from the quarterfinals, Süleyman Atlı defeated his Bulgarian rival Georgi Valentinov Vangelov 5-4 and advanced to the semifinals. Süleyman Atlı, who faced Roberti Dingashvili in the semifinals, defeated his Georgian opponent 13-1 and reached the final. In the final, he lost to Aliabbas Rzazade of Azerbaijan 12-2 and won the silver medal.

He competed at the 2024 European Wrestling Olympic Qualification Tournament in Baku, Azerbaijan hoping to qualify for the 2024 Summer Olympics in Paris, France. He was eliminated in his second match and he did not qualify for the Olympics.

== Achievements ==
Year	Tournament	Location	Result	Event
2017	European Championships	Novi Sad, Serbia	3rd	Freestyle 57 kg
2018	World Championships	Budapest, Hungary	3rd	Freestyle 57 kg
2019	European Championships	Bucharest, Romania	1st	Freestyle 57 kg
2019	World Championships	Nur-Sultan, Kazakhstan	2nd	Freestyle 57 kg
2019	European Games	Minsk, Belarus	3rd	Freestyle 57 kg
2020	European Championships	Rome, Italy	2nd	Freestyle 57 kg
2021	European Championships	Warsaw, Poland	1st	Freestyle 57 kg
2022	European Championships	Budapest, Hungary	2nd	Freestyle 61 kg
2023	European Championships	Zagreb, Croatia	2nd	Freestyle 57 kg
