= Sandeep Tomar =

Indian freestyle wrestler

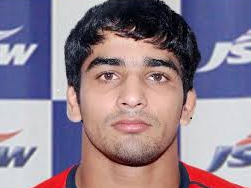

Personal information
- Born: Malakpur, Baghpat, Uttar Pradesh, India

Sport
- Sport: Wrestling
- Event: Freestyle
Medal record
Men's freestyle wrestling
Representing India
Asian Indoor Games
Bronze medal – third place	2017 Ashgabat	61kg
Asian Championships
Gold medal – first place	2016 Bangkok	57kg
Commonwealth Championships
Gold medal – first place	2013 Johannesburg	55kg
Gold medal – first place	2016 Singapore	57kg

Sandeep Tomar is an Indian former freestyle wrestler. Tomar represented India in the men's 57 kg event at the 2016 Rio Olympics.

== Career ==
=== 2012 National Wrestling Championships ===
Tomar won the gold medal at the National Championships in the 55 kg category. The 21-year-old Navy grappler was a National junior champion in 2011. He then won the men's 55 kg freestyle gold on his second attempt. He had finished fifth in his debut year in 2011.

Tomar defeated Nitin, a silver medal winner in the Hari Ram Indian Grand Prix with a 1-1, 3–0 scoreline.

=== 2012 Copa Brasil ===
At the Rio de Janeiro tournament held from 29 November to 2 December, Tomar was one of 9 gold medallists from the Indian contingent which included 4 bronze medals as well.

=== 2013 Commonwealth Wrestling Championships ===
In the men's freestyle 55 kg category at the tournament held in Johannesburg, South Africa, Tomar won the gold medal ahead of Narender from India and Bokan Masunyane from South Africa.

=== 2015 Pro Wrestling League ===
Sandeep was the third Indian male wrestler acquired by the Bangalore franchise (owned by JSW Sport) of the Pro Wrestling League. His final bid amount was Rs 10.3 lakh.

The 2015 Pro Wrestling League was scheduled to be held from 10 December to 27 December across 6 cities.

=== 2016 Olympic Games, Rio de Janeiro ===
Qualified for India, in men's 57 kg free style and lost to Viktor Lebedev 7-3

== Other titles ==
- Dave Schultz Memorial Tournament, 2013 - Bronze
- Dave Schultz Memorial Tournament, 2014 - Bronze
- World Military Championship, USA, 2014 - Gold
- Takhiti Cup, Iran, 2015 - Bronze
