= Yuki Takahashi (wrestler) =

Japanese freestyle wrestler

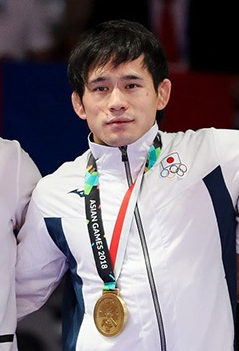
- Takahashi at the 2018 Asian Games

Personal information
- Native name: 高橋裕紀
- Nationality: Japan
- Born: 29 November 1993 (age 32) Kuwana, Mie Prefecture, Japan
- Height: 159 cm (5 ft 3 in)

Sport
- Country: Japan
- Sport: Wrestling
- Weight class: 57 kg (126 lb)
- Event: Freestyle
- Coached by: Masanori Ohashi (club); Kenji Inoue (national)
Medal record
Men's freestyle wrestling
Representing Japan
World Championships
Gold medal – first place	2017 Paris	57 kg
Bronze medal – third place	2018 Budapest	57 kg
Asian Games
Bronze medal – third place	2018 Jakarta	57 kg
Asian Championships
Gold medal – first place	2017 New Delhi	57 kg
Bronze medal – third place	2020 New Delhi	57 kg
Bronze medal – third place	2019 Xi'an	57 kg
Olympic Qualification Tournament
Gold medal – first place	2021 Sofia	57 kg
Japan National Championships
Gold medal – first place	2020 Tokyo	57 kg
Silver medal – second place	2019 Tokyo	57 kg
Gold medal – first place	2018 Tokyo	57 kg
Gold medal – first place	2017 Tokyo	57 kg
Gold medal – first place	2016 Tokyo	57 kg
Youth Olympic Games
Gold medal – first place	2010 Singapore	54 kg

Yuki Takahashi (高橋 侑希, Takahashi Yūki; born 29 November 1993) is a Japanese freestyle wrestler who currently competes at 57 kilograms. In 2017, Takahashi became the World Champion and the Asian Champion, also medaling at both events in the next editions. He represented Japan at the 2020 Summer Olympics after claiming gold at the 2021 Asian Olympic Qualification Tournament.
