= Mihran Jaburyan =

Armenian freestyle wrestler

Personal information
- Born: 16 November 1984 (age 41) Yerevan, Armenia
- Height: 1.60 m (5 ft 3 in)
- Weight: 60 kg (130 lb)

Sport
- Sport: Wrestling
- Event: Freestyle
- Club: Malatia Yerevan
- Coached by: Norayr Serobyan

Mihran Jaburyan (Armenian: Միհրան Ջաբուրյան, born 16 November 1984) is an Armenian Freestyle wrestler. He won the Armenian Championship in 2010 and 2011. Jaburyan competed at the 2012 Summer Olympics in the men's freestyle 55 kg division, reaching the quarter-finals.
