= Esra Pul =

Turkish freestyle wrestler

Sport
- Country: Turkey
- Sport: Amateur wrestling
- Event: Freestyle
- Club: Ankara B.Ş.B.
Medal record
Women's freestyle wrestling
Representing Turkey
Yasar Dogu Tournament
Silver medal – second place	2023 Istanbul	53 kg
Silver medal – second place	2025 Kocaeli	55 kg
Silver medal – second place	2026 Antalya	55 kg
Bronze medal – third place	2020 Istanbul	55 kg
Bronze medal – third place	2024 Antalya	55 kg
Grand Prix
Bronze medal – third place	2022 Tunis	53 kg
University World Cup
Bronze medal – third place	2022 Samsun	55 kg
European U23 Championship
Bronze medal – third place	2021 Skopje	55 kg

Esra Pul is a Turkish freestyle wrestler competing in the 55 kg division. She is a member of Ankara B.Ş.B.

== Career ==
In 2021, she won the bronze medal in the women's 55 kg event at the 2021 European U23 Wrestling Championship held in Skopje, North Macedonia.

In 2022, she competed at the Yasar Dogu Tournament held in Istanbul, Turkey.
