= Sandra Paruszewski =

German freestyle wrestler

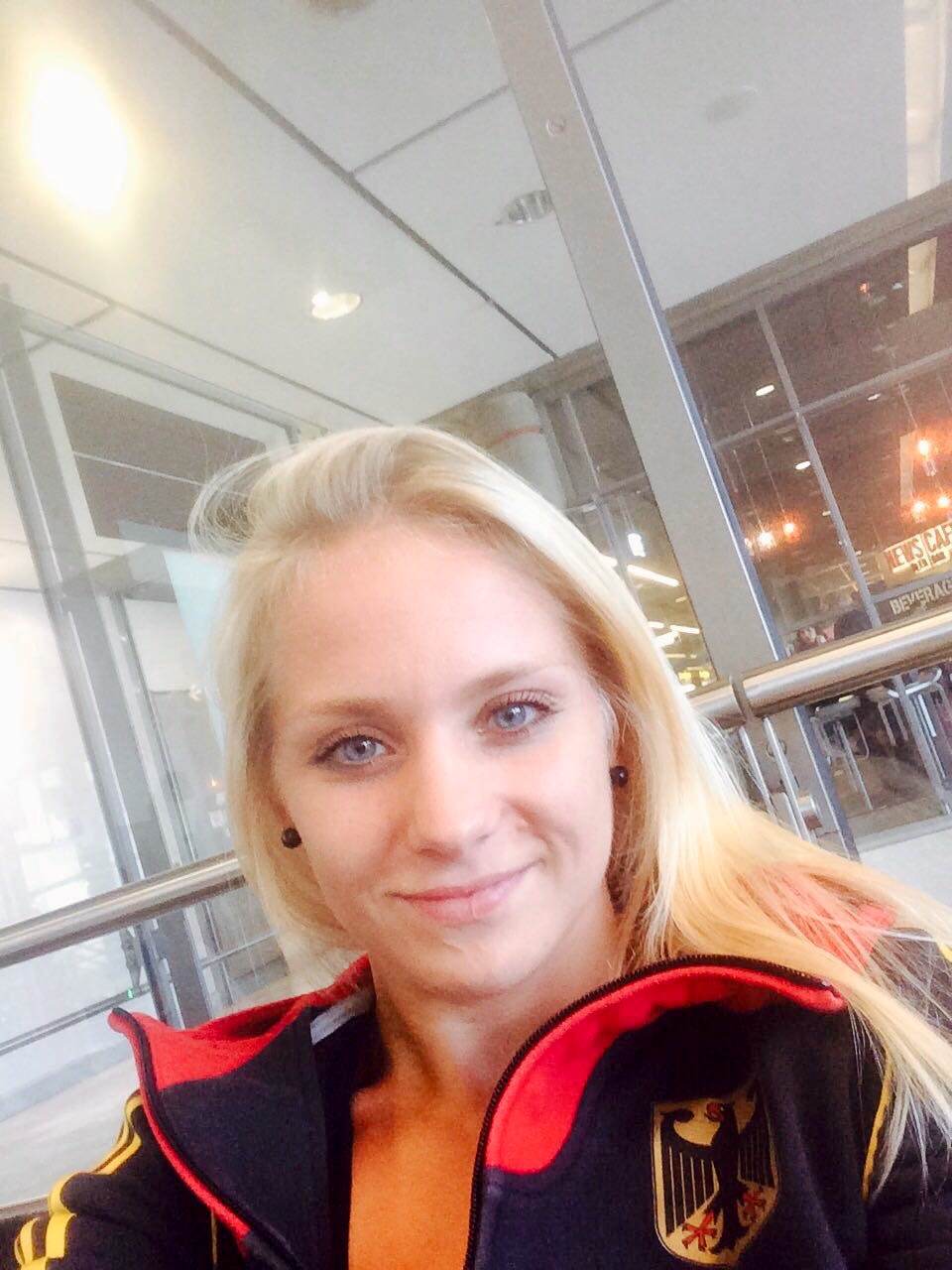
- Paruszewski in 2018

Personal information
- Born: 3 November 1993 (age 32) Baden-Württemberg, Germany
- Height: 1.65 m (5 ft 5 in)
- Weight: 59 kg (130 lb)

Sport
- Country: Germany
- Sport: Women's freestyle wrestling
- Event: 59 kg
- Club: AV Sulgen
- Coached by: Armen Mkrtchyan
Medal record
Women's freestyle wrestling
Representing Germany
European Championships
Bronze medal – third place	2022 Budapest	57 kg
Bronze medal – third place	2023 Zagreb	59 kg
Yasar Dogu Tournament
Bronze medal – third place	2019 Istanbul	57 kg
Bronze medal – third place	2024 Antalya	57 kg

Sandra Paruszewski (born 3 November 1993) is a German freestyle wrestler competing in the 57 kg and 59 kg divisions. She is a two-time bronze medalist at the European Wrestling Championships.

== Career ==
Paruszewski won a bronze medal by defeating Poland's Anhelina Lysak 4–2 in the third place match in the women's freestyle 57 kg at the 2022 European Wrestling Championships in Budapest, Hungary.

In 2023, Paruszewski won the bronze medal in the women's freestyle 59 kg event at the European Wrestling Championships held in Zagreb, Croatia.

Paruszewski competed in the women's 59 kg event at the 2024 European Wrestling Championships held in Bucharest, Romania. She was eliminated in her first match. She competed at the 2024 European Wrestling Olympic Qualification Tournament in Baku, Azerbaijan and she earned a quota place for Germany for the 2024 Summer Olympics in Paris, France. Paruszewski competed in the women's 57 kg event.

== Achievements ==
Year	Tournament	Location	Result	Event
2022	European Championships	Budapest, Hungary	3rd	Freestyle 57 kg
2023	European Championships	Zagreb, Croatia	3rd	Freestyle 59 kg
