= 2025 Grand Prix of Spain =

- Host city: Madrid, Spain
- Dates: 4–6 July 2025
- Stadium: Consejo Superior de Deportes

Champions
- Freestyle: Bahrain
- Greco-Roman: Spain
- Women: Poland

The 2025 Grand Prix of Spain was a major wrestling tournament held in Madrid, Spain from 4 to 6 July 2025.

== Event videos ==
The event aired freely on the Scorizer YouTube channel.

Broadcasting
4 July 2025 Mat A. Q & S	4 July 2025 Mat B. Q & S	
4 July 2025 Mat A. Q & S Ref POV	4 July 2025 Mat B. Q & S Ref POV	
4 July 2025 Mat A. Rep. & 3rd/5th	4 July 2025 Mat B. Rep. & 3rd/5th	
4 July 2025 Mat A. Rep. & 3rd/5th Ref POV	4 July 2025 Mat B. Rep. & 3rd/5th Ref POV	
	4 July 2025 Finals	
4 July 2025 Finals Ref's POV
5 July 2025 Mat A. Q & S	5 July 2025 Mat B. Q & S	5 July 2025 Mat C. Q & S
5 July 2025 Mat A. Q & S Ref POV	5 July 2025 Mat B. Q & S Ref POV	5 July 2025 Mat C. Q & S Ref POV
5 July 2025 Mat A. Rep. & 3rd/5th	5 July 2025 Mat B. Rep. & 3rd/5th	5 July 2025 Mat C. Rep. & 3rd/5th
5 July 2025 Mat A. Rep. & 3rd/5th Ref POV	5 July 2025 Mat B. Rep. & 3rd/5th Ref POV	5 July 2025 Mat C. Rep. & 3rd/5th Ref POV
	5 July 2025 Finals	
5 July 2025 Finals Ref's POV
6 July 2025 Mat A. Q & S	6 July 2025 Mat B. Q & S	6 July 2025 Mat C. Q & S
6 July 2025 Mat A. Q & S Ref POV	6 July 2025 Mat B. Q & S Ref POV	6 July 2025 Mat C. Q & S Ref POV
6 July 2025 Mat A. Rep. & 3rd/5th	6 July 2025 Mat B. Rep. & 3rd/5th	6 July 2025 Mat C. Rep. & 3rd/5th
6 July 2025 Mat A. Rep. & 3rd/5th Ref POV	6 July 2025 Mat B. Rep. & 3rd/5th Ref POV	6 July 2025 Mat C. Rep. & 3rd/5th Ref POV
	6 July 2025 Finals	
6 July 2025 Finals Ref's POV

== Medal table ==
* Host nation (Spain)

Rank	Nation	Gold	Silver	Bronze	Total
1	Spain*	4	6	11	21
2	Kazakhstan	4	4	1	9
3	Bahrain	4	0	1	5
4	Poland	3	2	2	7
5	Canada	2	5	5	12
6	Venezuela	2	3	1	6
7	Puerto Rico	2	1	3	6
8	United States	1	2	2	5
9	Austria	1	1	3	5
10	Albania	1	0	0	1
10	Czech Republic	1	0	0	1
10	Ecuador	1	0	0	1
10	Israel	1	0	0	1
10	Nigeria	1	0	0	1
10	Slovakia	1	0	0	1
10	Switzerland	1	0	0	1
17	Germany	0	3	1	4
18	Moldova	0	1	2	3
19	Belgium	0	1	0	1
20	Costa Rica	0	0	1	1
20	France	0	0	1	1
20	Norway	0	0	1	1
20	Sweden	0	0	1	1
Totals (23 entries)		30	29	36	95

== Team ranking ==
Rank	Men's freestyle		Men's Greco-Roman		Women's freestyle	
Rank	Team	Points	Team	Points	Team	Points
1	Bahrain	115	Spain	164	Poland	165
2	Spain	109	Kazakhstan	135	Canada	145
3	Puerto Rico	91	Venezuela	80	Spain	109
4	Kazakhstan	90	Austria	40	United States	80
5	Germany	75	Switzerland	25	Czech Republic	35

== Medal overview ==
=== Men's freestyle ===
Event	Gold	Silver	Bronze
57 kg	Darian Cruz; Puerto Rico	Yelaman Amangeldi; Kazakhstan	Jacob Morán; Puerto Rico
57 kg	Darian Cruz; Puerto Rico	Yelaman Amangeldi; Kazakhstan	Peter Hammer; Costa Rica
61 kg	Joey Silva; Puerto Rico	Andrei Vitan; Moldova	Dario Dittrich; Germany
65 kg	Víctor Parra; Venezuela	Ilyas Abdurashidov; Belgium	Leonid Colesnic; Moldova
65 kg	Víctor Parra; Venezuela	Ilyas Abdurashidov; Belgium	Alibeg Alibegov; Bahrain
70 kg	Islam Dudaev; Albania	Kevin Henkel; Germany	Quentin Sticker; France
74 kg	Magomedrasul Asluev; Bahrain	Tanner Peake; Puerto Rico	Pablo Díez; Spain
79 kg	Khidir Saipudinov; Bahrain	Gregor Eigenbrodt; Germany	Mohammad Mottaghinia; Spain
79 kg	Khidir Saipudinov; Bahrain	Gregor Eigenbrodt; Germany	Ion Laurențiu Marcu; Moldova
86 kg	Taimuraz Friev; Spain	Simon Marchl; Austria	Gabriel Iglesias; Spain
86 kg	Taimuraz Friev; Spain	Simon Marchl; Austria	Aidan Stevenson; Canada
92 kg	Uri Kalashnikov; Israel	Bekzat Amangali; Kazakhstan	Sultan Kopbayev; Spain
97 kg	Akhmed Tazhudinov; Bahrain	Ertuğrul Ağca; Germany	Nishan Randhawa; Canada
97 kg	Akhmed Tazhudinov; Bahrain	Ertuğrul Ağca; Germany	Benjamin Greil; Austria
125 kg	Shamil Sharipov; Bahrain	Jorawar Dhinsa; Canada	Jonovan Smith; Puerto Rico

=== Men's Greco-Roman ===
Event	Gold	Silver	Bronze
55 kg	Arsen Zhuma; Kazakhstan	Carlos Vives; Spain	Not awarded as there were only 2 competitors.
60 kg	Salamat Muratuly; Kazakhstan	Yonaiker Martínez; Venezuela	Daniel Bobillo; Spain
63 kg	Aser Ebro; Spain	David Díaz; Spain	Not awarded as there were only 2 competitors.
67 kg	Diego Esteche; Spain	Alejandro Esteche; Spain	Héctor Alcántara; Spain
72 kg	Yussuf Ashrapov; Kazakhstan	Azamat Zhuban; Kazakhstan	Aker Al-Obaidi; Austria
77 kg	Marcos Sánchez-Silva; Spain	Antonio Carmona; Spain	Clay Johnston; United States
82 kg	Nurdaulet Rakhman; Kazakhstan	Júnior Benítez; Spain	José Ángel Teso; Spain
87 kg	Damian von Euw; Switzerland	Brian Ruíz; Venezuela	Baglan Kuanysh; Kazakhstan
97 kg	Daniel Gastl; Austria	Nurassyl Amanaly; Kazakhstan	Juan Díaz; Venezuela
130 kg	Luis Talavera; Venezuela	None awarded Only one participant was registered.	

=== Women's freestyle ===
Event	Gold	Silver	Bronze
50 kg	Agata Walerzak; Poland	Nohalis Loyo; Venezuela	Aintzane Gorría; Spain
50 kg	Agata Walerzak; Poland	Nohalis Loyo; Venezuela	María Cazalla; Spain
53 kg	Roksana Zasina; Poland	Serena Di Benedetto; Canada	Carla Jaume; Spain
53 kg	Roksana Zasina; Poland	Serena Di Benedetto; Canada	Oleksandra Kogut; Austria
55 kg	Madisyn Grof; Canada	Patrycja Strzelczyk; Poland	Laura Gómez; Spain
57 kg	Laurence Beauregard; Canada	Gabriela Cross; Canada	Mia Friesen; Canada
59 kg	Aubre Krazer; United States	Jowita Wrzesień; Poland	Othelie Høie; Norway
62 kg	Esther Kolawole; Nigeria	Haylie Jaffe; United States	Alicja Nowosad; Poland
62 kg	Esther Kolawole; Nigeria	Haylie Jaffe; United States	Ella Doornaert; Canada
65 kg	Olha Padoshyk; Poland	Jonelle Clarke; Canada	Daniella Nugent; United States
68 kg	Adéla Hanzlíčková; Czech Republic	Jordyn Fouse; United States	Daniela Tkachuk; Poland
68 kg	Adéla Hanzlíčková; Czech Republic	Jordyn Fouse; United States	Leilani Hernández; Puerto Rico
72 kg	Zsuzsanna Molnár; Slovakia	Lorena Lera; Spain	None awarded as there were only 2 competitors.
76 kg	Génesis Reasco; Ecuador	Brianna Fraser; Canada	Vianne Rouleau; Canada
76 kg	Génesis Reasco; Ecuador	Brianna Fraser; Canada	Elvira Braun; Sweden

== Participating nations ==
182 wrestlers from 32 countries:

1. Albania (1)
2. Austria (6)
3. Bahrain (5)
4. Belgium (1)
5. Canada (25)
6. Republic of the Congo (2)
7. Costa Rica (1)
8. Czech Republic (2)
9. Ecuador (2)
10. Spain (42) (Host)
11. Finland (2)
12. France (1)
13. Germany (7)
14. Hungary (4)
15. Israel (2)
16. Italy (2)
17. Kazakhstan (16)
18. Lithuania (2)
19. Moldova (3)
20. Malta (4)
21. Nigeria (1)
22. Norway (1)
23. Poland (14)
24. Portugal (2)
25. Puerto Rico (13)
26. Switzerland (3)
27. Slovakia (1)
28. Sweden (1)
29. Tunisia (1)
30. Northern Cyprus (1)
31. United States (6)
32. Venezuela (9)

== Results ==
Legend

- F — Won by fall
- R — Retired
- WO — Won by walkover

=== Men's freestyle ===
==== Men's freestyle 57 kg ====
Round of 16
José Falcón (VEN)	3
Guesseppe Rea (ECU)	3
Gorka Gracia (ESP)	0
Jacob Morán (PUR)	10
Stone Perlungher (SUI)	6
Adrián Samano (PUR)	16

Quarterfinals
Darian Cruz (PUR)	2^{F}
Raymel Cabello (ESP)	0
Gary Giordimaina (MLT)	0
Peter Hammer (CRC)	8^{F}
Yelaman Amangeldi (KAZ)	7
Guesseppe Rea (ECU)	4
Jacob Morán (PUR)	12
Adrián Samano (PUR)	1

Semifinals
Darian Cruz (PUR)	11
Peter Hammer (CRC)	0
Yelaman Amangeldi (KAZ)}	3
Jacob Morán (PUR)	2

Final
Darian Cruz (PUR)	11
Yelaman Amangeldi (KAZ)	0

Bronze medals
Peter Hammer (CRC)	7^{F}
Raymel Cabello (ESP)	0
Jacob Morán (PUR)	10
Guesseppe Rea (ECU)	0

==== Men's freestyle 61 kg ====
Pos	Athlete	Pld	W	L	CP	TP	GER	PUR	SUI
1	Dario Dittrich (GER)	2	2	0	8	23	—	11–0	12–0
2	Lucas Rodríguez (PUR)	2	1	1	3	8	0–4 SU	—	8–7
3	River Perlungher (SUI)	2	0	2	1	7	0–4 SU	1–3 PO1	—

Source: UWW

Pos	Athlete	Pld	W	L	CP	TP	PUR	MDA	HUN
1	Joey Silva (PUR)	2	2	0	8	9	—	9–2	WO
2	Andrei Vitan (MDA)	2	1	1	5	2	1–3 PO1	—	WO
—	Balázs Rácz (HUN)	2	0	2	0	0	0–5 FO	0–5 FO	—

Source: UWW

Semifinals
Dario Dittrich (GER)	6
Andrei Vitan (MDA)	17
Joey Silva (PUR)	11
Lucas Rodríguez (PUR)	0

Final
Andrei Vitan (MDA)	0
Joey Silva (PUR)	2
Bronze medal
Dario Dittrich (GER)	11
Lucas Rodríguez (PUR)	0

==== Men's freestyle 65 kg ====
Round of 16
Felipe Ferrusola (ESP)	WO
~~Banzouzi Malonga (CGO)~~

Quarterfinals
Carlos Álvarez (ESP)	8^{F}
Mark Bugeja (MLT)	0
Alibeg Alibegov (BRN)	0
Víctor Parra (VEN)	6
Zoltán Mizsei (HUN)	10
Leonid Colesnic (MDA)	18
Ilyas Abdurashidov (BEL)	9
Felipe Ferrusola (ESP)	1

Semifinals
Carlos Álvarez (ESP)	0
Víctor Parra (VEN)	10
Leonid Colesnic (MDA)	9
Ilyas Abdurashidov (BEL)	9

Final
Víctor Parra (VEN)	10
Ilyas Abdurashidov (BEL)	0

Bronze medals
Carlos Álvarez (ESP)	6
Alibeg Alibegov (BRN)	9
Leonid Colesnic (MDA)	9
Felipe Ferrusola (ESP)	2

==== Men's freestyle 70 kg ====
Pos	Athlete	Pld	W	L	CP	TP	ALB	GER	GER	ESP
1	Islam Dudaev (ALB)	3	3	0	10	25	—	5–0	9–0	11–0
2	Rostislav Leicht (GER)	3	2	1	7	12	0–3 PO	—	2–1	10–0
3	Burak Emin Salviz (GER)	3	1	2	6	7	0–3 PO	1–3 PO1	—	6–0 Fall
4	Oskaras Viskontas (ESP)	3	0	3	0	0	0–4 SU	0–4 SU	0–5 FA	—

Source: UWW

Pos	Athlete	Pld	W	L	CP	TP	GER	FRA	HUN
1	Kevin Henkel (GER)	2	2	0	8	21	—	10–0	11–0
2	Quentin Sticker (FRA)	2	1	1	4	11	0–4 SU	—	11–0
3	Márton Varga (HUN)	2	0	2	0	0	0–4 SU	0–4 SU	—

Source: UWW

Semifinals
Islam Dudaev (ALB)	18
Quentin Sticker (FRA)	8
Kevin Henkel (GER)	8
Rostislav Leicht (GER)	1

Final
Islam Dudaev (ALB)	6
Kevin Henkel (GER)	0
Bronze medal
Quentin Sticker (FRA)	12
Rostislav Leicht (GER)	0

==== Men's freestyle 74 kg ====
Pos	Athlete	Pld	W	L	CP	TP	PUR	KAZ	ESP
1	Tanner Peake (PUR)	2	2	0	8	16	—	7–5 Fall	9–0
2	Nariman Kengali (KAZ)	2	1	1	3	10	0–5 FA	—	5–2
3	Fabricio Reyes (ESP)	2	0	2	1	2	0–3 PO	1–3 PO1	—

Source: UWW

Pos	Athlete	Pld	W	L	CP	TP	BRN	ESP	MLT
1	Magomedrasul Asluev (BRN)	2	2	0	8	20	—	10–0	10–0
2	Pablo Díez (ESP)	2	1	1	4	12	0–4 SU	—	12–1
3	Nico Zarb (MLT)	2	0	2	1	1	0–4 SU	1–4 SU1	—

Source: UWW

Semifinals
Tanner Peake (PUR)	11
Pablo Díez (ESP)	0
Magomedrasul Asluev (BRN)	10
Nariman Kengali (KAZ)	1

Final
Tanner Peake (PUR)	1
Magomedrasul Asluev (BRN)	9
Bronze medal
Pablo Díez (ESP)	11
Nariman Kengali (KAZ)	7

==== Men's freestyle 79 kg ====
Round of 16
Shane Jones (PUR)	0
Mohammad Mottaghinia (ESP)	10
Myrzabek Nurlybekov (KAZ)	2
Khidir Saipudinov (BRN)	12
Nándor Hajduch (HUN)	8
Darragh Love (GBR)	0
Connor Church (CAN)	1
Gregor Eigenbrodt (GER)	11
Ion Laurențiu Marcu (MDA)	6
Joona Vuoti (FIN)	6
Dilpreet Randhawa (CAN)	WO
~~Jean Claude Atongui (CGO)~~

Quarterfinals
Owen Gudmundson (CAN)	0
Lucas Kahnt (GER)	8
Mohammad Mottaghinia (ESP)	0
Khidir Saipudinov (BRN)	10
Nándor Hajduch (HUN)	0
Gregor Eigenbrodt (GER)	11
Ion Laurențiu Marcu (MDA)	11
Dilpreet Randhawa (CAN)	0

Semifinals
Lucas Kahnt (GER)	0
Khidir Saipudinov (BRN)	10
Gregor Eigenbrodt (GER)	3
Ion Laurențiu Marcu (MDA)	1

Final
Khidir Saipudinov (BRN)	11
Gregor Eigenbrodt (GER)	0

Repechage round 1
Mohammad Mottaghinia (ESP)	11
Myrzabek Nurlybekov (KAZ)	0
Nándor Hajduch (HUN)	3
Connor Church (CAN)	13

Bronze medals
Lucas Kahnt (GER)	0
Mohammad Mottaghinia (ESP)	10
Ion Laurențiu Marcu (MDA)	11
Connor Church (CAN)	1

==== Men's freestyle 86 kg ====
Round of 16
Ömer Özyıldırım (TRNC)	0
Taimuraz Friev (ESP)	10
Aidan Stevenson (CAN)	15
Michel Dole (CGO)	1

Quarterfinals
Taran Goring (CAN)	3
Simon Marchl (AUT)	14
Gabriel Iglesias (ESP)	8
Paulius Leščauskas (LTU)	1
Aidyn Tazhigali (KAZ)	2
Steven Rodríguez (VEN)	0^{R}
Taimuraz Friev (ESP)	10
Aidan Stevenson (CAN)	0

Semifinals
Simon Marchl (AUT)	9
Gabriel Iglesias (ESP)	4
Aidyn Tazhigali (KAZ)	0
Taimuraz Friev (ESP)	10

Final
Simon Marchl (AUT)	2
Taimuraz Friev (ESP)	6

Repechage round 1
Aidan Stevenson (CAN)	11
Ömer Özyıldırım (TRNC)	0

Bronze medals
Gabriel Iglesias (ESP)	10
Taran Goring (CAN)	0
Aidyn Tazhigali (KAZ)	4
Aidan Stevenson (CAN)	8

==== Men's freestyle 92 kg ====
Pos	Athlete	Pld	W	L	CP	TP	KAZ	ESP	MLT	NOR
1	Bekzat Amangali (KAZ)	3	3	0	13	25	—	14–4	11–0	WO
2	Mykola Tolmachov (ESP)	3	2	1	7	17	1–4 SU1	—	4–0 Fall	WO
3	Cedric Vella (MLT)	3	1	2	5	16	0–4 SU	0–5 FA	—	WO
—	~~GUDRUN HOIE (NOR)~~	3	0	3	0	0	0–5 FO	0–5 FO	0–5 FO	—

Source: UWW

Pos	Athlete	Pld	W	L	CP	TP	ISR	ESP	BRN
1	Uri Kalashnikov (ISR)	2	2	0	8	9	—	7–0	WO
2	Sultan Kopbayev (ESP)	2	1	1	5	0	0–3 PO	—	WO
—	Magomed Sharipov (BRN)	2	0	2	0	0	0–5 FO	0–5 FO	—

Source: UWW

Semifinals
Bekzat Amangali (KAZ)	8^{F}
Sultan Kopbayev (ESP)	0
Uri Kalashnikov (ISR)	10
Mykola Tolmachov (ESP)	0

Final
Bekzat Amangali (KAZ)	5
Uri Kalashnikov (ISR)	7
Bronze medal
Sultan Kopbayev (ESP)	11
Mykola Tolmachov (ESP)	0

==== Men's freestyle 97 kg ====
Round of 16
Aimar Alzón (ESP)	0
Nishan Randhawa (CAN)	10
Alex Ortiz (PUR)	5
Nikita Goubarets (ISR)	5

Quarterfinals
Edwin Morales (PUR)	0
Benjamin Greil (AUT)	10
Ertuğrul Ağca (GER)	6
Domantas Pauliuščenko (LTU)	3
Khamzat Tsurov (KAZ)	0
Akhmed Tazhudinov (BRN)	10
Nishan Randhawa (CAN)	11
Nikita Goubarets (ISR)	0

Semifinals
Benjamin Greil (AUT)	1
Ertuğrul Ağca (GER)	4
Akhmed Tazhudinov (BRN)	13
Nishan Randhawa (CAN)	2

Final
Ertuğrul Ağca (GER)	0
Akhmed Tazhudinov (BRN)	6^{F}

Bronze medals
Benjamin Greil (AUT)	6
Domantas Pauliuščenko (LTU)	0
Nishan Randhawa (CAN)	10
Khamzat Tsurov (KAZ)	0

==== Men's freestyle 125 kg ====
Pos	Athlete	Pld	W	L	CP	TP	PUR	CAN	KAZ	ESP
1	Jonovan Smith (PUR)	3	3	0	10	23	—	4–1	9–3	10–0
2	Roger Li (CAN)	3	2	1	8	10	1–3 PO1	—	14–4	5–2
3	Yerali Abdazov (KAZ)	3	1	2	5	10	1–3 PO1	1–4 SU1	—	3–3
4	Carlos Acebrón (ESP)	3	0	3	2	5	0–4 SU	1–3 PO1	1–3 PO1	—

Source: UWW

Pos	Athlete	Pld	W	L	CP	TP	BRN	CAN	HUN
1	Shamil Sharipov (BRN)	2	2	0	7	17	—	10–0	7–0
2	Jorawar Dhinsa (CAN)	2	1	1	3	9	0–4 SU	—	9–2
3	Milán Gellén (HUN)	2	0	2	1	2	0–3 PO	1–3 PO1	—

Source: UWW

Semifinals
Jonovan Smith (PUR)	0
Jorawar Dhinsa (CAN)	6
Shamil Sharipov (BRN)	9^{F}
Roger Li (CAN)	0

Final
Jorawar Dhinsa (CAN)	0
Shamil Sharipov (BRN)	11
Bronze medal
Jonovan Smith (PUR)	7
Roger Li (CAN)	4

=== Men's Greco-Roman ===
==== Men's Greco-Roman 55 kg ====
Pos	Athlete	Pld	W	L	CP	TP	KAZ	ESP
1	Arsen Zhuma (KAZ)	1	1	0	4	8	—	8–0
2	Carlos Vives (ESP)	1	0	1	0	0	0–4 SU	—

Source: UWW

==== Men's Greco-Roman 60 kg ====
Pos	Athlete	Pld	W	L	CP	TP	KAZ	VEN	ESP
1	Salamat Muratuly (KAZ)	2	2	0	8	13	—	7–1	6–0 Fall
2	Yonaiker Martínez (VEN)	2	1	1	4	6	1–3 PO1	—	5–3
3	Daniel Bobillo (ESP)	2	0	2	1	3	0–5 FA	1–3 PO1	—

Source: UWW

==== Men's Greco-Roman 63 kg ====
Pos	Athlete	Pld	W	L	CP	TP	ESP	ESP
1	Aser Ebro (ESP)	1	1	0	4	8	—	7–0
2	David Díaz (ESP)	1	0	1	0	0	0–3 PO	—

Source: UWW

==== Men's Greco-Roman 67 kg ====
Pos	Athlete	Pld	W	L	CP	TP	ESP	ESP	ESP	ESP
1	Diego Esteche (ESP)	3	3	0	12	27	—	11–2	8–0	8–0
2	Alejandro Esteche (ESP)	3	2	1	10	15	1–4 SU1	—	13–3	WO
3	Héctor Alcántara (ESP)	3	1	2	6	10	0–4 SU	1–4 SU1	—	7–0 Fall
4	Daniel Campos (ESP)	3	0	3	0	0	0–4 SU	0–5 IN	0–5 FA	—

Source: UWW

==== Men's Greco-Roman 72 kg ====
Pos	Athlete	Pld	W	L	CP	TP	AUT	ESP	POR
1	Aker Al-Obaidi (AUT)	2	2	0	5	12	—	4–0	8–0
2	Ibai Gracia (ESP)	2	1	1	4	11	0–3 PO	—	11–0
3	Nelson Sobral (POR)	2	0	2	0	0	0–4 SU	0–4 SU	—

Source: UWW

Pos	Athlete	Pld	W	L	CP	TP	KAZ	KAZ	POR
1	Yussuf Ashrapov (KAZ)	2	2	0	9	12	—	4–0 Fall	8–0
2	Azamat Zhuban (KAZ)	2	1	1	5	4	0–5 FA	—	4–5 Fall
3	João Simões (POR)	2	0	2	0	5	0–4 SU	0–5 FA	—

Source: UWW

Semifinals
Aker Al-Obaidi (AUT)	4
Azamat Zhuban (KAZ)	7
Yussuf Ashrapov (KAZ)	11^{F}
Ibai Gracia (ESP)	2

Final
Azamat Zhuban (KAZ)	0
Yussuf Ashrapov (KAZ)	8
Bronze medal
Aker Al-Obaidi (AUT)	8
Ibai Gracia (ESP)	0

==== Men's Greco-Roman 77 kg ====
Pos	Athlete	Pld	W	L	CP	TP	ESP	ESP	USA
1	Marcos Sánchez-Silva (ESP)	2	2	0	8	17	—	9–0	8–0
2	Antonio Carmona (ESP)	2	1	1	4	8	0–4 SU	—	8–0
3	Clay Johnston (USA)	2	0	2	0	0	0–4 SU	0–4 SU	—

Source: UWW

==== Men's Greco-Roman 82 kg ====
Pos	Athlete	Pld	W	L	CP	TP	KAZ	ESP	ESP	ESP
1	Nurdaulet Rakhman (KAZ)	3	3	0	12	28	—	9–0	9–0	10–0
2	Júnior Benítez (ESP)	3	2	1	8	18	0–4 SU	—	8–0	10–2
3	José Ángel Teso (ESP)	3	1	2	4	9	0–4 SU	0–4 SU	—	9–0
4	Manuel Muñoz (ESP)	3	0	3	1	2	0–4 SU	1–4 SU1	0–4 SU	—

Source: UWW

==== Men's Greco-Roman 87 kg ====
Pos	Athlete	Pld	W	L	CP	TP	VEN	KAZ	KAZ	CGO
1	Brian Ruíz (VEN)	3	2	1	9	26	—	9–0	5–10	9–0
2	Baglan Kuanysh (KAZ)	3	2	1	8	18	0–4 SU	—	9–0	9–0
3	Yerassyl Zhengis (KAZ)	3	2	1	7	19	3–1 PO1	0–4 SU	—	9–0
4	Jean Claude Atongui (CGO)	3	0	3	0	0	0–4 SU	0–4 SU	0–4 SU	—

Source: UWW

Pos	Athlete	Pld	W	L	CP	TP	SUI	ESP	USA
1	Damian von Euw (SUI)	2	2	0	8	17	—	9–0	8–0
2	Mohamed Amin Mainich (ESP)	2	1	1	4	11	0–4 SU	—	11–2
3	Mason Parsons (USA)	2	0	2	1	2	0–4 SU	1–4 SU1	—

Source: UWW

Semifinals
Brian Ruíz (VEN)	8
Mohamed Amin Mainich (ESP)	0
Damian von Euw (SUI)	11
Baglan Kuanysh (KAZ)	0

Final
Brian Ruíz (VEN)	1
Damian von Euw (SUI)	5
Bronze medal
Mohamed Amin Mainich (ESP)	0
Baglan Kuanysh (KAZ)	8

==== Men's Greco-Roman 97 kg ====
Pos	Athlete	Pld	W	L	CP	TP	AUT	KAZ	VEN	KAZ	ESP
1	Daniel Gastl (AUT)	4	4	0	15	31	—	5–2	9–0	8–0	9–0
2	Nurassyl Amanaly (KAZ)	4	3	1	12	26	1–3 PO1	—	6–2	8–3	10–4 Fall
3	Juan Díaz (VEN)	4	2	2	8	15	0–4 SU	1–3 PO1	—	4–1	9–0
4	Maxim Ukraintsev (KAZ)	4	1	3	5	9	0–4 SU	1–3 PO1	1–3 PO1	—	5–1
5	José Ferrándiz (ESP)	4	0	4	1	5	0–4 SU	0–5 FA	0–4 SU	1–3 PO1	—

Source: UWW

==== Men's Greco-Roman 130 kg ====
Pos	Athlete	Pld	W	L	CP	TP	VEN
1	Luis Talavera (VEN)	1	1	0	0	0	—

Source: UWW

=== Women's freestyle ===
==== Women's freestyle 50 kg ====
Round of 16
Chahrazed Ayachi (TUN)	0
Nohalis Loyo (VEN)	5
Amanda Tomczyk (POL)	6
Madison MacKenzie (CAN)	6

Quarterfinals
Kelyn Young (CAN)	0
Agata Walerzak (POL)	10
Ivy Threatful (CAN)	6
Aintzane Gorría (ESP)	11
Augusta Eve (CAN)	0
María Cazalla (ESP)	4
Nohalis Loyo (VEN)	4
Madison MacKenzie (CAN)	1

Semifinals
Agata Walerzak (POL)	12
Aintzane Gorría (ESP)	1
María Cazalla (ESP)	2
Nohalis Loyo (VEN)	3

Final
Agata Walerzak (POL)	4
Nohalis Loyo (VEN)	4

Repechage round 1
Madison MacKenzie (CAN)	8
Chahrazed Ayachi (TUN)	10

Bronze medals
Aintzane Gorría (ESP)	7
Kelyn Young (CAN)	6
María Cazalla (ESP)	6
Chahrazed Ayachi (TUN)	0

==== Women's freestyle 53 kg ====
Round of 16
~~Danielle Minimbou Bimang (CGO)~~
Francesca Lo Greco (CAN)	WO

Quarterfinals
Serena Di Benedetto (CAN)	2^{F}
Maria Ferone (ITA)	0
Oleksandra Kogut (AUT)	6
Victoria Báez (ESP)	4
~~Lucía Yépez (ECU)~~
Carla Jaume (ESP)	WO'
Roksana Zasina (POL)	10
Francesca Lo Greco (CAN)	0

Semifinals
Serena Di Benedetto (CAN)	5
Oleksandra Kogut (AUT)	3
Carla Jaume (ESP)	2
Roksana Zasina (POL)	9^{F}

Final
Serena Di Benedetto (CAN)	1
Roksana Zasina (POL)	3^{F}

Bronze medals
Oleksandra Kogut (AUT)	13
Maria Ferone (ITA)	0
Carla Jaume (ESP)	10
Francesca Lo Greco (CAN)	0

==== Women's freestyle 55 kg ====
Pos	Athlete	Pld	W	L	CP	TP	CAN	POL	ESP	ESP
1	Madisyn Grof (CAN)	3	3	0	10	19	—	2–1	7–2	10–0
2	Patrycja Strzelczyk (POL)	3	2	1	8	18	1–3 PO1	—	5–5	12–2
3	Laura Gómez (ESP)	3	1	2	7	13	1–3 PO1	1–3 PO1	—	6–0 Fall
4	Pau Gimeno (ESP)	3	0	3	1	2	0–4 SU	1–4 SU1	0–5 FA	—

Source: UWW

==== Women's freestyle 57 kg ====
Pos	Athlete	Pld	W	L	CP	TP	CAN	CAN	POL	FIN
1	Mia Friesen (CAN)	3	2	1	8	27	—	5–8	13–2	9–6
2	Laurence Beauregard (CAN)	3	2	1	8	22	3–1 PO1	—	4–15	10–0
3	Magdalena Głodek (POL)	3	2	1	8	21	1–4 SU1	4–1 SU1	—	4–3
4	Jenna Hemiä (FIN)	3	0	3	2	9	1–3 PO1	0–4 SU	1–3 PO1	—

Source: UWW

Pos	Athlete	Pld	W	L	CP	TP	ESP	CAN	PUR
1	Graciela Sánchez (ESP)	2	2	0	7	16	—	3–2	13–2
2	Gabriela Cross (CAN)	2	1	1	6	11	1–3 PO1	—	9–0 Fall
3	Eliana White-Vega (PUR)	2	0	2	1	2	1–4 SU1	0–5 FA	—

Source: UWW

Semifinals
Mia Friesen (CAN)	1
Gabriela Cross (CAN)	5
Graciela Sánchez (ESP)	0
Laurence Beauregard (CAN)	10

Final
Gabriela Cross (CAN)	0
Laurence Beauregard (CAN)	10
Bronze medal
Mia Friesen (CAN)	6^{F}
Graciela Sánchez (ESP)	0

==== Women's freestyle 59 kg ====
Pos	Athlete	Pld	W	L	CP	TP	POL	NOR	CZE	POL
1	Jowita Wrzesień (POL)	3	3	0	12	28	—	8–1	9–0 Fall	11–0
2	Othelie Høie (NOR)	3	2	1	8	15	1–3 PO1	—	10–0	4–0
3	Anna Michalcová (CZE)	3	1	2	3	5	0–5 FA	0–4 SU	—	5–1
4	Aleksandra Witos (POL)	3	0	3	1	1	0–4 SU	0–3 PO	1–3 PO1	—

Source: UWW

Pos	Athlete	Pld	W	L	CP	TP	USA	POL	ESP
1	Aubre Krazer (USA)	2	2	0	9	11	—	11–0	WO
2	Julia Nowicka (POL)	2	1	1	4	0	0–4 SU	—	WO
—	Elvira Martínez-Barquero (ESP)	2	0	2	0	0	0–5 FO	0–5 FO	—

Source: UWW

Semifinals
Jowita Wrzesień (POL)	4
Julia Nowicka (POL)	1
Aubre Krazer (USA)	13
Othelie Høie (NOR)	2

Final
Jowita Wrzesień (POL)	1
Aubre Krazer (USA)	2
Bronze medal
Julia Nowicka (POL)	0
Othelie Høie (NOR)	4

==== Women's freestyle 62 kg ====
Quarterfinals		Semifinals		Final
Ella Doornaer (CAN)	5
Natalia Kubaty (POL)	4	Ella Doornaer (CAN)	1
Haylie Jaffe (USA)	16	Haylie Jaffe (USA)	2
Immacolata Danise (ITA)	6			Haylie Jaffe (USA)	0
Miki Rowbottom (CAN)	0			Esther Kolawole (NGR)	10
Alicja Nowosad (POL)	10	Alicja Nowosad (POL)	1
Lydia Pérez (ESP)	0	Esther Kolawole (NGR)	4
Esther Kolawole (NGR)	10

Bronze medals
Immacolata Danise (ITA)	0
Ella Doornaer (CAN)	10
Lydia Pérez (ESP)	0
Alicja Nowosad (POL)	10

==== Women's freestyle 65 kg ====
Pos	Athlete	Pld	W	L	CP	TP	ESP	CAN	FIN
1	Nerea Pampín (ESP)	2	2	0	8	14	—	6–1	8–0 Fall
2	Jonelle Clarke (CAN)	2	1	1	6	11	1–3 PO1	—	10–1 Fall
3	Silja Kamppinen (FIN)	2	0	2	0	1	0–5 FA	0–5 FA	—

Source: UWW

Pos	Athlete	Pld	W	L	CP	TP	USA	POL	ESP
1	Daniella Nugent (USA)	2	2	0	8	19	—	11–11	8–0 Fall
2	Olha Padoshyk (POL)	2	1	1	5	21	1–3 PO1	—	10–0
3	Manuela Noguerol (ESP)	2	0	2	0	0	0–5 FA	0–4 SU	—

Source: UWW

Semifinals
Nerea Pampín (ESP)	6
Olha Padoshyk (POL)	14^{F}
Daniella Nugent (USA)	4
Jonelle Clarke (CAN)	7

Final
Olha Padoshyk (POL)	4^{F}
Jonelle Clarke (CAN)	0
Bronze medal
Nerea Pampín (ESP)	2
Daniella Nugent (USA)	7^{F}

==== Women's freestyle 68 kg ====
Round of 16
Daniela Tkachuk (POL)	4
Aleah Nickel (CAN)	3

Quarterfinals
Angelina Ellis-Toddington (CAN)	3
Karolina Domaszuk (POL)	7
Leilani Hernández (PUR)	4
Jordyn Fouse (USA)	7
Gilbery García (VEN)	6
Vanessa Keefe (CAN)	16
Adéla Hanzlíčková (CZE)	4^{F}
Daniela Tkachuk (POL)	0

Semifinals
Karolina Domaszuk (POL)	5
Jordyn Fouse (USA)	6
Vanessa Keefe (CAN)	0
Adéla Hanzlíčková (CZE)	4^{F}

Final
Jordyn Fouse (USA)	0
Adéla Hanzlíčková (CZE)	10

Bronze medals
Karolina Domaszuk (POL)	0
Leilani Hernández (PUR)	11
Vanessa Keefe (CAN)	2
Daniela Tkachuk (POL)	8^{F}

==== Women's freestyle 72 kg ====
Pos	Athlete	Pld	W	L	CP	TP	SVK	ESP
1	Zsuzsanna Molnár (SVK)	1	1	0	5	6	—	6–0 Ret
2	Lorena Lera (ESP)	1	0	1	0	0	0–5 IN	—

Source: UWW

==== Women's freestyle 76 kg ====
Quarterfinals		Semifinals		Final
Vianne Rouleau (CAN)	8^{F}
Paola Rodríguez (PUR)	0	Vianne Rouleau (CAN)	0
Carla Lera (ESP)	0	Génesis Reasco (ECU)	10
Génesis Reasco (ECU)	10			Génesis Reasco (ECU)	10
Brianna Fraser (CAN)	6			Brianna Fraser (CAN)	0
Patrycja Cuber (POL)	5	Brianna Fraser (CAN)	6
~~Erica Ngakali (CGO)~~		Elvira Braun (SWE)	0
Elvira Braun (SWE)	WO

Bronze medals
Carla Lera (ESP)	2
Vianne Rouleau (CAN)	8^{F}
Patrycja Cuber (POL)	2
Elvira Braun (SWE)	7
