= 2023 European Wrestling Championships – Women's freestyle 59 kg =

Wrestling competition

Women's freestyle 59 kg at the 2023 European Wrestling Championships
- Venue: Arena Zagreb
- Location: Zagreb, Croatia
- Dates: 19-20 April
- Competitors: 11

Medalists
gold medal	Anastasia Nichita	Moldova
silver medal	Yuliya Tkach	Ukraine
bronze medal	Othelie Høie	Norway
bronze medal	Sandra Paruszewski	Germany

The women's freestyle 59 kg is a competition featured at the 2023 European Wrestling Championships, and will held in Zagreb, Croatia on April 19 and 20.

== Results ==
Legend

- F — Won by fall
- WO — Won by walkover

Round of 16
Anhelina Lysak (POL)	4
Othelie Høie (NOR)	6
Sandra Paruszewski (GER)	11
Kelsey Barnes (GBR)	0
Jovana Radivojević (SRB)	0
Morena De Vita (ITA)	2^{F}

Quarterfinals
Anastasia Nichita (MDA)	10
Othelie Høie (NOR)	1
Eda Tekin (TUR)	3
Nikolett Szabó (HUN)	1
Yuliya Tkach (UKR)	3
Sandra Paruszewski (GER)	0
Morena De Vita (ITA)	2
Alyona Kolesnik (AZE)	2^{F}

Semifinals
Anastasia Nichita (MDA)	10
Eda Tekin (TUR)	0
Yuliya Tkach (UKR)	10
Alyona Kolesnik (AZE)	0

Final
Anastasia Nichita (MDA)	WO
Yuliya Tkach (UKR)

Bronze medal match
Othelie Høie (NOR)	6
Eda Tekin (TUR)	4
Sandra Paruszewski (GER)	3
Alyona Kolesnik (AZE)	1

== Final standing ==
Rank	Athlete
1st place, gold medalist(s)	Anastasia Nichita (MDA)
2nd place, silver medalist(s)	Yuliya Tkach (UKR)
3rd place, bronze medalist(s)	Othelie Høie (NOR)
3rd place, bronze medalist(s)	Sandra Paruszewski (GER)
5	Alyona Kolesnik (AZE)
5	Eda Tekin (TUR)
7	Morena De Vita (ITA)
8	Anhelina Lysak (POL)
9	Nikolett Szabó (HUN)
10	Jovana Radivojević (SRB)
11	Kelsey Barnes (GBR)
