= 2024 Grand Prix of Spain =

- Host city: Madrid, Spain
- Dates: 5–7 July 2024
- Stadium: Consejo Superior de Deportes

Champions
- Freestyle: Germany
- Greco-Roman: Kazakhstan
- Women: United States

The 2024 Grand Prix of Spain is an international wrestling event held in Madrid, Spain, from 5 to 7 July 2024.

== Event videos ==
The event aired on the Scorizer Youtube channel.

Broadcasting
| 5 July 2024 Mat A. Qual. and, 1/2 | 5 July 2024 Mat B. Qual. and, 1/2 | 5 July 2024 Mat C. Qual. and, 1/2 |
| 5 July 2024 Mat A. Rep. and 3º/5º | 5 July 2024 Mat B. Rep. and 3º/5º | 5 July 2024 Mat C. Rep. and 3º/5º |
| | 5 July 2024 Finals | |
| 6 July 2024 Mat A. Qual. and, 1/2 | 6 July 2024 Mat B. Qual. and, 1/2 | 6 July 2024 Mat C. Qual. and, 1/2 |
| 6 July 2024 Mat A. Rep. and 3º/5º | 6 July 2024 Mat B. Rep. and 3º/5º | 6 July 2024 Mat C. Rep. and 3º/5º |
| | 6 July 2024 Finals | |
| 7 July 2024 Mat A. Qual. and, 1/2 | 7 July 2024 Mat B. Qual. and, 1/2 | 7 July 2024 Mat C. Qual. and, 1/2 |
| 7 July 2024 Mat A. Rep. and 3º/5º | 7 July 2024 Mat B. Rep. and 3º/5º | 7 July 2024 Mat C. Rep. and 3º/5º |
| | 7 July 2024 Finals | |

== Medal table ==
* Host nation (Spain)

| Rank | Nation | Gold | Silver | Bronze | Total |
|---|---|---|---|---|---|
| 1 | Kazakhstan | 5 | 7 | 9 | 21 |
| 2 | United States | 5 | 2 | 6 | 13 |
| 3 | France | 3 | 2 | 6 | 11 |
| 4 | Cuba | 3 | 0 | 1 | 4 |
| 5 | Germany | 2 | 1 | 3 | 6 |
| 6 | Poland | 2 | 1 | 2 | 5 |
| 7 | Canada | 1 | 5 | 5 | 11 |
| 8 | Czech Republic | 1 | 2 | 0 | 3 |
| 9 | Egypt | 1 | 1 | 1 | 3 |
| 10 | Individual Neutral Athletes | 1 | 1 | 0 | 2 |
| 10 | Venezuela | 1 | 1 | 0 | 2 |
| 12 | Puerto Rico | 1 | 0 | 2 | 3 |
| 13 | Austria | 1 | 0 | 0 | 1 |
| 13 | Ecuador | 1 | 0 | 0 | 1 |
| 13 | India | 1 | 0 | 0 | 1 |
| 16 | Spain* | 0 | 2 | 2 | 4 |
| 17 | Israel | 0 | 2 | 0 | 2 |
| 18 | Bulgaria | 0 | 1 | 0 | 1 |
| 18 | Colombia | 0 | 1 | 0 | 1 |
| 20 | Nigeria | 0 | 0 | 2 | 2 |
| 20 | Sweden | 0 | 0 | 2 | 2 |
| 22 | Greece | 0 | 0 | 1 | 1 |
| 22 | Italy | 0 | 0 | 1 | 1 |
| 22 | New Zealand | 0 | 0 | 1 | 1 |
| Totals (24 entries) | | 29 | 29 | 44 | 102 |

== Team ranking ==
| Rank | Men's freestyle | | Men's Greco-Roman | | Women's freestyle | |
| Rank | Team | Points | Team | Points | Team | Points |
|---|---|---|---|---|---|---|
| 1 | Germany | 122 | Kazakhstan | 174 | United States | 149 |
| 2 | Canada | 110 | France | 81 | Canada | 141 |
| 3 | United States | 100 | Egypt | 60 | Kazakhstan | 95 |
| 4 | Spain | 92 | Spain | 56 | France | 90 |
| 5 | Poland | 75 | Poland | 47 | Spain | 89 |

== Medal overview ==
=== Men's freestyle ===
| Event | Gold | Silver | Bronze |
|---|---|---|---|
| 57 kg | Niklas Stechele; Germany | Treye Trotman; Canada | Darian Cruz; Puerto Rico |
| 61 kg | Joey Silva; Puerto Rico | Daniel Popov; Israel | Garette Saunders; Canada |
| 61 kg | Joey Silva; Puerto Rico | Daniel Popov; Israel | Teetje Richter; Germany |
| 65 kg | Alejandro Valdés; Cuba | Peiman Biabani; Canada | Quentin Sticker; France |
| 65 kg | Alejandro Valdés; Cuba | Peiman Biabani; Canada | Marwane Yezza; France |
| 70 kg | Yahya Thomas; United States | Yernur Nurgazy; Kazakhstan | Saúl Bello; Spain |
| 70 kg | Yahya Thomas; United States | Yernur Nurgazy; Kazakhstan | Saba Bolaghi; Germany |
| 74 kg | Quincy Monday; United States | Anthony Montero; Venezuela | Geandry Garzón; Cuba |
| 74 kg | Quincy Monday; United States | Anthony Montero; Venezuela | Adam Thomson; Canada |
| 79 kg | Kennedy Monday; United States | Lennox Wolak; United States | Lucas Kahnt; Germany |
| 79 kg | Kennedy Monday; United States | Lennox Wolak; United States | Zelimkhan Khadjiev; France |
| 86 kg | Chance Marsteller; United States | Taran Goring; Canada | Gabriel Iglesias; Spain |
| 92 kg | Adlan Viskhanov; France | Uri Kalashnikov; Israel | Filip Rogut; Poland |
| 97 kg | Arturo Silot; Cuba | Ertuğrul Ağca; Germany | Michał Bielawski; Poland |
| 125 kg | Robert Baran; Poland | Kamil Kościółek; Poland | Jonovan Smith; Puerto Rico |

=== Men's Greco-Roman ===
| Event | Gold | Silver | Bronze |
|---|---|---|---|
| 55 kg | no competitors | | |
| 60 kg | Kanat Akytybek; Kazakhstan | Aibek Yesmuratov; Kazakhstan | Amangali Bekbolatov; Kazakhstan |
| 63 kg | Assaukhat Mukhamadiyev; Kazakhstan | Damir Ibrashov; Kazakhstan | Léo Tudezca; France |
| 67 kg | Dinislam Sagitzhan; Kazakhstan | Yanis Nifri; France | Dinmukhamed Omarov; Kazakhstan |
| 72 kg | Alikhan Kokenov; Kazakhstan | Madiyar Maulitkanov; Kazakhstan | Mohamed Ibrahim El-Sayed; Egypt |
| 72 kg | Alikhan Kokenov; Kazakhstan | Madiyar Maulitkanov; Kazakhstan | Noil Umarov; Kazakhstan |
| 77 kg | Ibragim Magomadov; Kazakhstan | Michal Zelenka; Czech Republic | Iznovr Abayev; Kazakhstan |
| 77 kg | Ibragim Magomadov; Kazakhstan | Michal Zelenka; Czech Republic | Erik Persson; Sweden |
| 82 kg | Pascal Eisele; Germany | Johnny Bur; France | Islam Yevloyev; Kazakhstan |
| 82 kg | Pascal Eisele; Germany | Johnny Bur; France | Miras Barshylykov; Kazakhstan |
| 87 kg | Arkadiusz Kułynycz; Poland | Carlos Muñoz; Colombia | Temirlan Turdakyn; Kazakhstan |
| 87 kg | Arkadiusz Kułynycz; Poland | Carlos Muñoz; Colombia | Timur Ospanov; Kazakhstan |
| 97 kg | Markus Ragginger; Austria | Mohamed Mostafa Ahmed; Egypt | Simone Fidelbo; Italy |
| 130 kg | Abdellatif Mohamed; Egypt | Marcel Albini; Czech Republic | Nikolaos Ntounias; Greece |

=== Women's freestyle ===
| Event | Gold | Silver | Bronze |
|---|---|---|---|
| 50 kg | Vinesh Phogat; India | Mariia Tiumerekova; Individual Neutral Athletes | Katie Dutchak; Canada |
| 50 kg | Vinesh Phogat; India | Mariia Tiumerekova; Individual Neutral Athletes | Tetiana Profatilova; France |
| 53 kg | Karla Godinez; Canada | Cristelle Rodriguez; United States | Samantha Stewart; Canada |
| 53 kg | Karla Godinez; Canada | Cristelle Rodriguez; United States | Christianah Ogunsanya; Nigeria |
| 55 kg | Tatiana Debien; France | Victoria Báez; Spain | Carissa Qureshi; United States |
| 57 kg | Luisa Valverde; Ecuador | Mia Friesen; Canada | Laura Almaganbetova; Kazakhstan |
| 57 kg | Luisa Valverde; Ecuador | Mia Friesen; Canada | Evelina Hulthén; Sweden |
| 59 kg | Anastasiia Sidelnikova; Individual Neutral Athletes | Graciela Sánchez; Spain | Alexis Janiak; United States |
| 59 kg | Anastasiia Sidelnikova; Individual Neutral Athletes | Graciela Sánchez; Spain | Othelie Høie; Norway |
| 62 kg | Astrid Montero; Venezuela | Bilyana Dudova; Bulgaria | Esther Kolawole; Nigeria |
| 62 kg | Astrid Montero; Venezuela | Bilyana Dudova; Bulgaria | Cadence Diduch; United States |
| 65 kg | Kendra Dacher; France | Irina Kazyulina; Kazakhstan | Reese Larramendy; United States |
| 68 kg | Adela Hanzlickova; Czech Republic | Linda Morais; Canada | Tayla Ford; New Zealand |
| 68 kg | Adela Hanzlickova; Czech Republic | Linda Morais; Canada | Jasmine Robinson; United States |
| 72 kg | Kylie Welker; United States | Zhamila Bakbergenova; Kazakhstan | Pauline Lecarpentier; France |
| 76 kg | Milaimys Marín; Cuba | Elmira Syzdykova; Kazakhstan | Brianna Fraser; Canada |
| 76 kg | Milaimys Marín; Cuba | Elmira Syzdykova; Kazakhstan | Kennedy Blades; United States |

== Participating nations ==
241 wrestlers from 32 countries:

1. Algeria (3)
2. Authorised Neutral Athletes (3)
3. Austria (2)
4. Belgium (1)
5. Bulgaria (1)
6. Canada (32)
7. Colombia (4)
8. Cuba (5)
9. Czech Republic (6)
10. Ecuador (2)
11. Egypt (3)
12. Spain (35) (Host)
13. Finland (1)
14. France (22)
15. Germany (12)
16. Greece (1)
17. Honduras (1)
18. India (1)
19. Israel (3)
20. Italy (3)
21. Kazakhstan (31)
22. South Korea (3)
23. Mexico (1)
24. Malta (2)
25. Nigeria (4)
26. Norway (3)
27. New Zealand (1)
28. Poland (17)
29. Puerto Rico (3)
30. Serbia (1)
31. Sweden (10)
32. United States (20)
33. UWW (1)

== Results ==
Legend

- F — Won by fall
- R — Retired
- WO — Won by walkover

=== Men's freestyle ===
==== Men's freestyle 57 kg ====
| Pos | Athlete | Pld | W | L | CP | TP | CAN | GER | ESP |
|---|---|---|---|---|---|---|---|---|---|
| 1 | Treye Trotman (CAN) | 2 | 2 | 0 | 7 | 13 | — | 3–2 | 10–0 |
| 2 | Niklas Stechele (GER) | 2 | 1 | 1 | 5 | 12 | 1–3 PO1 | — | 10–0 |
| 3 | Alessandro Iemma (ESP) | 2 | 0 | 2 | 0 | 0 | 0–4 SU | 0–4 SU | — |

Source: UWW

| Pos | Athlete | Pld | W | L | CP | TP | PUR | MLT | CAN |
|---|---|---|---|---|---|---|---|---|---|
| 1 | Darian Cruz (PUR) | 2 | 2 | 0 | 8 | 20 | — | 10–0 | 10–0 |
| 2 | Gary Giordimaina (MLT) | 2 | 1 | 1 | 5 | 8 | 0–4 SU | — | 8–2 Fall |
| 3 | Josh Skory (CAN) | 2 | 0 | 2 | 0 | 2 | 0–4 SU | 0–5 FA | — |

Source: UWW

Semifinals
Treye Trotman (CAN) | WO
Gary Giordimaina (MLT)
Darian Cruz (PUR) | 3
Niklas Stechele (GER) | 4

Final
Treye Trotman (CAN) | 1
Niklas Stechele (GER) | 4
Bronze medal
Gary Giordimaina (MLT)
Darian Cruz (PUR) | WO

==== Men's freestyle 61 kg ====
Round of 16
Garette Saunders (CAN) | WO
~~Arman Eloyan (FRA)~~

Quarterfinals
Christopher Merlo (CAN) | 2
Jules Gardette (FRA) | 13
Joey Silva (PUR) | 10
Teetje Richter (GER) | 0
~~Abdelhak Kherbache (ALG)~~
Daniel Popov (ISR) | WO
Ali-Reza Karimi (SWE) | 4
Garette Saunders (CAN) | 14

Semifinals
Jules Gardette (FRA) | 0
Joey Silva (PUR) | 10
Daniel Popov (ISR) | 8
Garette Saunders (CAN) | 4

Final
Joey Silva (PUR) | 10
Daniel Popov (ISR) | 4

Bronze medals
Jules Gardette (FRA) | 4
Teetje Richter (GER) | 6
Garette Saunders (CAN) | WO
~~Abdelhak Kherbache (ALG)~~

==== Men's freestyle 65 kg ====
| Quarterfinals | | Semifinals | | Final |
| Marwane Yezza (FRA) | 12 |
| Ilyas Abdurashidov (BEL) | 2 | Marwane Yezza (FRA) | 2 |
| Magomed Katojev (GER) | 0 | Peiman Biabani (CAN) | 8 |
| Peiman Biabani (CAN) | 7 | | | Peiman Biabani (CAN) | 1 |
| Quentin Sticker (FRA) | 2^{F} | | | Alejandro Valdés (CUB) | 2 |
| Carlos Álvarez (ESP) | 0 | Quentin Sticker (FRA) | 2 |
| Eneas Estrada (ESP) | 0 | Alejandro Valdés (CUB) | 13 |
| Alejandro Valdés (CUB) | 10 |

Bronze medals
Magomed Katojev (GER) | 5
Marwane Yezza (FRA) | 5
Eneas Estrada (ESP) | 0
Quentin Sticker (FRA) | 4^{F}

==== Men's freestyle 70 kg ====
Round of 16
Saúl Bello (ESP) | 0
Yernur Nurgazy (KAZ) | 10
Raul Zarbaliev (ISR) | 3
Moukhammad Sangariev (FRA) | 3
Daniel Coles (CAN) | 10
Javier Díaz-Alejo (ESP) | 0
Leon Gerstenberger (GER) | 12
Adam Mohaidly (CAN) | 2

Quarterfinals
Jacob Torres (CAN) | WO
Juan Pablo González (ESP)
Saba Bolaghi (GER) | 0
Yahya Thomas (USA) | 10
Yernur Nurgazy (KAZ) | 10
Raul Zarbaliev (ISR) | 0
Daniel Coles (CAN) | 5
Leon Gerstenberger (GER) | 5

Semifinals
Jacob Torres (CAN) | 0
Yahya Thomas (USA) | 10
Yernur Nurgazy (KAZ) | 10
Daniel Coles (CAN) | 0

Final
Yahya Thomas (USA) | 1
Yernur Nurgazy (KAZ) | 1

Repechage round 1
Raul Zarbaliev (ISR)
Saúl Bello (ESP) | WO

Bronze medals
Jacob Torres (CAN) | 3
Saba Bolaghi (GER) | 6
Daniel Coles (CAN)
Saúl Bello (ESP) | WO

==== Men's freestyle 74 kg ====
Round of 16
Quincy Monday (USA) | 11
Nico Zard (MLT) | 0
Anthony Montero (VEN) | 11
Pablo Díez (ESP) | 0
Ali Arsalan (SRB) | 10^{F}
Fabricio Reyes (ESP) | 0
Patrik Leder (CAN) | 6
Kamil Rybicki (POL) | 5
Ruhollah Kharoti (SWE) | 0
Geandry Garzón (CUB) | 11

Quarterfinals
Mohamed El-Karchouh (ESP) | 0
Adam Thomson (CAN) | 10
Szymon Wojtkowski (POL) | 0
Quincy Monday (USA) | 5
Anthony Montero (VEN) | 15
Ali Arsalan (SRB) | 8^{R}
Patrik Leder (CAN) | 5
Geandry Garzón (CUB) | 6

Semifinals
Adam Thomson (CAN) | 0
Quincy Monday (USA) | 11^{F}
Anthony Montero (VEN) | 4
Geandry Garzón (CUB) | 2

Final
Quincy Monday (USA) | 2
Anthony Montero (VEN) | 0

Repechage round 1
Szymon Wojtkowski (POL) | 10
Nico Zard (MLT) | 0
Ali Arsalan (SRB)
Pablo Díez (ESP) | WO

Bronze medals
Adam Thomson (CAN) | 7
Szymon Wojtkowski (POL) | 5
Geandry Garzón (CUB) | 12
Pablo Díez (ESP) | 1

==== Men's freestyle 79 kg ====
Round of 16
Azael García (ESP) | 4
Nariman Kengali (KAZ) | 8
Chemseddine Fetairia (ALG) | 12
Max Budgey (CAN) | 2
Mateusz Pędzicki (POL) | 0
Lennox Wolak (USA) | 12
Lucas Kahnt (GER) | WO
~~Saifedine Alekma (FRA)~~
Victor Hernández (MEX) | 5
Vilhelm Larsson (SWE) | 2

Quarterfinals
Kennedy Monday (USA) | 10
Richard Schröder (GER) | 0
Zelimkhan Khadjiev (FRA) | 10
Nariman Kengali (KAZ) | 0
Chemseddine Fetairia (ALG) | 0
Lennox Wolak (USA) | 6^{F}
Lucas Kahnt (GER) | 6
Victor Hernández (MEX) | 1

Semifinals
Kennedy Monday (USA) | 19
Zelimkhan Khadjiev (FRA) | 6
Lennox Wolak (USA) | 8
Lucas Kahnt (GER) | 6

Final
Kennedy Monday (USA) | 12
Lennox Wolak (USA) | 9

Repechage round 1
Chemseddine Fetairia (ALG) | 10
Mateusz Pędzicki (POL) | 12^{F}

Bronze medals
Zelimkhan Khadjiev (FRA) | 9
Richard Schröder (GER) | 0
Lucas Kahnt (GER) | 13
Mateusz Pędzicki (POL) | 2

==== Men's freestyle 86 kg ====
| Pos | Athlete | Pld | W | L | CP | TP | USA | CAN | ESP | CAN | GER |
|---|---|---|---|---|---|---|---|---|---|---|---|
| 1 | Chance Marsteller (USA) | 4 | 4 | 0 | 18 | 21 | — | 10–0 | 11–0 | WO | WO |
| 2 | Taran Goring (CAN) | 4 | 3 | 1 | 15 | 3 | 0–4 SU | — | 3–0 Fall | WO | WO |
| 3 | Gabriel Iglesias (ESP) | 4 | 1 | 3 | 4 | 10 | 0–4 SU | 0–5 FA | — | 2–6 | 6–0 |
| 4 | Alex Moore (CAN) | 4 | 1 | 3 | 3 | 6 | 0–5 IN | 0–5 IN | 3–1 PO1 | — | |
| 5 | Kiril Kildau (GER) | 4 | 0 | 4 | 0 | 0 | 0–5 IN | 0–5 IN | 0–3 PO | 0–0 2IN | — |

Source: UWW

==== Men's freestyle 92 kg ====
| Pos | Athlete | Pld | W | L | CP | TP | FRA | POL | CAN | ESP |
|---|---|---|---|---|---|---|---|---|---|---|
| 1 | Adlan Viskhanov (FRA) | 3 | 3 | 0 | 11 | 30 | — | 7–0 | 11–0 | 12–0 |
| 2 | Filip Rogut (POL) | 3 | 2 | 1 | 7 | 17 | 0–3 PO | — | 7–4 | 10–0 |
| 3 | Andrew Johnson (CAN) | 3 | 1 | 2 | 5 | 16 | 0–4 SU | 1–3 PO1 | — | 12–0 |
| 4 | Mykola Tolmachov (ESP) | 3 | 0 | 3 | 0 | 0 | 0–4 SU | 0–4 SU | 0–4 SU | — |

Source: UWW

| Pos | Athlete | Pld | W | L | CP | TP | ISR | ESP | ALG |
|---|---|---|---|---|---|---|---|---|---|
| 1 | Uri Kalashnikov (ISR) | 2 | 2 | 0 | 8 | 9 | — | 9–0 | WO |
| 2 | Sultan Kopbayev (ESP) | 2 | 1 | 1 | 5 | 0 | 0–3 PO | — | WO |
| — | Fateh Benferdjallah (ALG) | 2 | 0 | 2 | 0 | 0 | 0–5 FO | 0–5 FO | — |

Source: UWW

Semifinals
Adlan Viskhanov (FRA) | 12
Sultan Kopbayev (ESP) | 0
Uri Kalashnikov (ISR) | 8
Filip Rogut (POL) | 0

Final
Adlan Viskhanov (FRA) | 8
Uri Kalashnikov (ISR) | 5
Bronze medal
Sultan Kopbayev (ESP) | 0
Filip Rogut (POL) | 8^{F}

==== Men's freestyle 97 kg ====
| Pos | Athlete | Pld | W | L | CP | TP | CUB | GER | FIN | ESP |
|---|---|---|---|---|---|---|---|---|---|---|
| 1 | Arturo Silot (CUB) | 3 | 3 | 0 | 10 | 23 | — | 6–2 | 7–4 | 10–0 |
| 2 | Ertuğrul Ağca (GER) | 3 | 2 | 1 | 8 | 22 | 1–3 PO1 | — | 9–1 | 11–0 |
| 3 | Juho Ruusila (FIN) | 3 | 1 | 2 | 6 | 17 | 1–3 PO1 | 1–3 PO1 | — | 12–1 |
| 4 | Enrique Jiménez (ESP) | 3 | 0 | 3 | 1 | 1 | 0–4 SU | 0–4 SU | 1–4 SU1 | — |

Source: UWW

| Pos | Athlete | Pld | W | L | CP | TP | POL | POL | ESP |
|---|---|---|---|---|---|---|---|---|---|
| 1 | Michał Bielawski (POL) | 2 | 2 | 0 | 8 | 20 | — | 10–0 | 10–0 |
| 2 | Wiktor Hasa (POL) | 2 | 1 | 1 | 3 | 9 | 0–4 SU | — | 9–2 |
| 3 | Aimar Alzón (ESP) | 2 | 0 | 2 | 1 | 2 | 0–4 SU | 1–3 PO1 | — |

Source: UWW

Semifinals
Arturo Silot (CUB) | 10
Wiktor Hasa (POL) | 0
Michał Bielawski (POL) | 3
Ertuğrul Ağca (GER) | 5

Final
Arturo Silot (CUB) | 8
Ertuğrul Ağca (GER) | 0
Bronze medal
Wiktor Hasa (POL) | 0
Michał Bielawski (POL) | 5

==== Men's freestyle 125 kg ====
| Pos | Athlete | Pld | W | L | CP | TP | POL | GER | GRE |
|---|---|---|---|---|---|---|---|---|---|
| 1 | Robert Baran (POL) | 2 | 2 | 0 | 9 | 10 | — | 10–0 | WO |
| 2 | Lucas Gansi (GER) | 2 | 1 | 1 | 5 | 0 | 0–4 SU | — | WO |
| — | Azamat Khosonov (GRE) | 2 | 0 | 2 | 0 | 0 | 0–5 FO | 0–5 FO | — |

Source: UWW

| Pos | Athlete | Pld | W | L | CP | TP | POL | PUR | ESP |
|---|---|---|---|---|---|---|---|---|---|
| 1 | Kamil Kościółek (POL) | 2 | 2 | 0 | 8 | 8 | — | 8–2 | WO |
| 2 | Jonovan Smith (PUR) | 2 | 1 | 1 | 6 | 3 | 1–3 PO1 | — | 1–1 Ret |
| 3 | Carlos Acebrón (ESP) | 2 | 0 | 2 | 0 | 1 | 0–5 IN | 0–5 IN | — |

Source: UWW

Semifinals
Robert Baran (POL) | 11
Jonovan Smith (PUR) | 0
Kamil Kościółek (POL) | 10
Lucas Gansi (GER) | 0

Final
Robert Baran (POL) | 8
Kamil Kościółek (POL) | 2
Bronze medal
Jonovan Smith (PUR) | 4
Lucas Gansi (GER) | 0

=== Men's Greco-Roman ===
==== Men's Greco-Roman 60 kg ====
| Pos | Athlete | Pld | W | L | CP | TP | POL | KAZ | ESP | UWW |
|---|---|---|---|---|---|---|---|---|---|---|
| 1 | Olivier Skrzypczak (POL) | 3 | 3 | 0 | 13 | 17 | — | 9–0 | 8–0 | WO |
| 2 | Kanat Akytbek (KAZ) | 3 | 2 | 1 | 8 | 8 | 0–4 SU | — | 8–8 | WO |
| 3 | Daniel Bobillo (ESP) | 3 | 1 | 2 | 6 | 8 | 0–4 SU | 1–3 PO1 | — | WO |
| — | Jamal Valizadeh (UWW) | 3 | 0 | 3 | 0 | 0 | 0–5 FO | 0–5 FO | 0–5 FO | — |

Source: UWW

| Pos | Athlete | Pld | W | L | CP | TP | KAZ | KAZ | KAZ |
|---|---|---|---|---|---|---|---|---|---|
| 1 | Amangali Bekbolatov (KAZ) | 2 | 2 | 0 | 6 | 6 | — | 3–1 | 3–0 |
| 2 | Aibek Yesmuratov (KAZ) | 2 | 1 | 1 | 5 | 11 | 1–3 PO1 | — | 10–2 |
| 3 | Ongdassyn Khamitov (KAZ) | 2 | 0 | 2 | 1 | 2 | 0–3 PO | 1–4 SU1 | — |

Source: UWW

Semifinals
Olivier Skrzypczak (POL) | 6
Aibek Yesmuratov (KAZ) | 15
Amangali Bekbolatov (KAZ) | 1
Kanat Akytbek (KAZ) | 1

Final
Aibek Yesmuratov (KAZ)
Kanat Akytbek (KAZ) | WO
Bronze medal
Olivier Skrzypczak (POL) | 6
Amangali Bekbolatov (KAZ) | 9

==== Men's Greco-Roman 63 kg ====
| Pos | Athlete | Pld | W | L | CP | TP | KAZ | FRA | ESP |
|---|---|---|---|---|---|---|---|---|---|
| 1 | Damir Ibrashov (KAZ) | 2 | 2 | 0 | 9 | 19 | — | 9–4 Fall | 10–1 |
| 2 | Léo Tudezca (FRA) | 2 | 1 | 1 | 4 | 12 | 0–5 FA | — | 8–0 |
| 3 | Diego Esteche (ESP) | 2 | 0 | 2 | 1 | 4 | 1–4 SU1 | 0–4 SU | — |

Source: UWW

| Pos | Athlete | Pld | W | L | CP | TP | KAZ | GER | VEN |
|---|---|---|---|---|---|---|---|---|---|
| 1 | Assaukhat Mukhamadiyev (KAZ) | 2 | 2 | 0 | 8 | 4 | — | 5–4 | WO |
| 2 | Janis Heinzelbecker (GER) | 2 | 1 | 1 | 5 | 11 | 1–3 PO1 | — | WO |
| — | Raiber Rodríguez (VEN) | 2 | 0 | 2 | 3 | 3 | 0–5 FO | 0–5 FO | — |

Source: UWW

Semifinals
Damir Ibrashov (KAZ) | 11
Janis Heinzelbecker (GER) | 2
Assaukhat Mukhamadiyev (KAZ) | 1
Léo Tudezca (FRA) | 1

Final
Damir Ibrashov (KAZ) | 3
Assaukhat Mukhamadiyev (KAZ) | 3
Bronze medal
Janis Heinzelbecker (GER) | 0
Léo Tudezca (FRA) | 9

==== Men's Greco-Roman 67 kg ====
| Pos | Athlete | Pld | W | L | CP | TP | KAZ | KAZ | ITA | FRA |
|---|---|---|---|---|---|---|---|---|---|---|
| 1 | Dinislam Sagitzhan (KAZ) | 3 | 3 | 0 | 11 | 6 | — | 1–1 | 5–1 | WO |
| 2 | Dinmukhamed Omarov (KAZ) | 3 | 2 | 1 | 11 | 11 | 1–3 PO1 | — | 10–5 Fall | WO |
| 3 | Steve Momilia (ITA) | 3 | 1 | 2 | 6 | 11 | 1–3 PO1 | 0–5 FA | — | 5–0 Ret |
| 4 | Stefan Clément (FRA) | 3 | 0 | 3 | 0 | 0 | 0–5 IN | 0–5 IN | 0–5 IN | — |

Source: UWW

| Pos | Athlete | Pld | W | L | CP | TP | FRA | ECU | KAZ |
|---|---|---|---|---|---|---|---|---|---|
| 1 | Yanis Nifri (FRA) | 2 | 2 | 0 | 9 | 17 | — | 5–3 | 12–1 |
| 2 | Andrés Montaño (ECU) | 2 | 1 | 1 | 4 | 12 | 1–3 PO1 | — | 9–2 |
| 3 | Bagdat Sabaz (KAZ) | 2 | 0 | 2 | 2 | 3 | 1–4 SU1 | 1–3 PO1 | — |

Source: UWW

Semifinals
Dinislam Sagitzhan (KAZ) | 9
Andrés Montaño (ECU) | 3
Yanis Nifri (FRA) | 5
Dinmukhamed Omarov (KAZ) | 1

Final
Dinislam Sagitzhan (KAZ) | 5
Yanis Nifri (FRA) | 1
Bronze medal
Andrés Montaño (ECU) | 0
Dinmukhamed Omarov (KAZ) | 8

==== Men's Greco-Roman 72 kg ====
Round of 16
Gonzalo Caparrós (ESP) | 0
Madiyar Maulitkanov (KAZ) | 9
Junior Benítez (ESP) | 0
Mohamed Ibrahim El-Sayed (EGY) | 9
Naïm Bolaky-Meïte (FRA) | 0
Alikhan Kokenov (KAZ) | 6
Georgios Barbanos (SWE) | 8
Amer Sassi (TUN) | 0
Syrym Sarsen (KAZ) | 1
Daniyar Kalenov (KAZ) | 1

Quarterfinals
Noil Umarov (KAZ) | 9
Christoffer Dahlén (SWE) | 1
Giovanni Alessio (ITA) | 0
Madiyar Maulitkanov (KAZ) | 9
Mohamed Ibrahim El-Sayed (EGY) | 1
Alikhan Kokenov (KAZ) | 1
Georgios Barbanos (SWE) | 4
Daniyar Kalenov (KAZ) | 0

Semifinals
Noil Umarov (KAZ) | 0
Madiyar Maulitkanov (KAZ) | 2^{F}
Alikhan Kokenov (KAZ) | 3
Georgios Barbanos (SWE) | 1

Final
Madiyar Maulitkanov (KAZ) | 1
Alikhan Kokenov (KAZ) | 5

Repechage round 1
Giovanni Alessio (ITA) | 5
Gonzalo Caparrós (ESP) | 1
Mohamed Ibrahim El-Sayed (EGY) | 9
Naïm Bolaky-Meïte (FRA) | 0

Bronze medals
Noil Umarov (KAZ) | 4^{F}
Giovanni Alessio (ITA) | 0
Georgios Barbanos (SWE) | 0
Mohamed Ibrahim El-Sayed (EGY) | 7

==== Men's Greco-Roman 77 kg ====
Round of 16
Erik Persson (SWE) | 1
Ibragim Magomadov (KAZ) | 9

Quarterfinals
Iznovr Abayev (KAZ) | WO
~~Sergey Kutuzov (AIN)~~
Marcos Sánchez-Silva (ESP) | 1^{R}
Michal Zelenka (CZE) | 2
~~Andrés González (ESP)~~
Ludvig Herman (NOR) | WO
Jair Cuero (COL) | 3
Ibragim Magomadov (KAZ) | 3

Semifinals
Iznovr Abayev (KAZ) | 3
Michal Zelenka (CZE) | 4^{F}
Ludvig Herman (NOR) | 1
Ibragim Magomadov (KAZ) | 7

Final
Michal Zelenka (CZE) | 1
Ibragim Magomadov (KAZ) | 3

Repechage round 1
Jair Cuero (COL) | 0
Erik Persson (SWE) | 5

Bronze medals
Iznovr Abayev (KAZ) | WO
Marcos Sánchez-Silva (ESP)
Ludvig Herman (NOR) | 0
Erik Persson (SWE) | 2^{F}

==== Men's Greco-Roman 82 kg ====
Round of 16
Islam Yevloyev (KAZ) | 9
Ivo Švígler (CZE) | 1

Quarterfinals
Miras Barshylykov (KAZ) | 2^{F}
Marek Vrba (CZE) | 2
Michael Wagner (AUT) | 0
Pascal Eisele (GER) | 9
Patryk Bednarz (POL) | 0
Johnny Bur (FRA) | 8
Lukas Ahlgren (SWE) | 4
Islam Yevloyev (KAZ) | 5

Semifinals
Miras Barshylykov (KAZ) | 0
Pascal Eisele (GER) | 6
Johnny Bur (FRA) | 7^{F}
Islam Yevloyev (KAZ) | 2

Final
Pascal Eisele (GER) | 6^{F}
Johnny Bur (FRA) | 2

Bronze medals
Miras Barshylykov (KAZ) | 6^{F}
Michael Wagner (AUT) | 7
Islam Yevloyev (KAZ) | 9
Patryk Bednarz (POL) | 0

==== Men's Greco-Roman 87 kg ====
| Quarterfinals | | Semifinals | | Final |
| Shamil Ozhaev (KAZ) | 8 |
| Daniel Herrero (ESP) | 0 | Shamil Ozhaev (KAZ) | 3 |
| Timur Ospanov (KAZ) | 7 | Arkadiusz Kułynycz (POL) | 3 |
| Arkadiusz Kułynycz (POL) | 9 | | | Arkadiusz Kułynycz (POL) | 5 |
| Temirlan Turdakyn (KAZ) | 5^{F} | | | Carlos Muñoz (COL) | 4 |
| Vladimeri Karchaidze (FRA) | 6 | Temirlan Turdakyn (KAZ) | 1 |
| Artur Melikyan (ESP) | | Carlos Muñoz (COL) | 3 |
| Carlos Muñoz (COL) | WO |

Bronze medals
Timur Ospanov (KAZ) | WO
Shamil Ozhaev (KAZ)
Artur Melikyan (ESP)
Temirlan Turdakyn (KAZ) | WO

==== Men's Greco-Roman 97 kg ====
| Pos | Athlete | Pld | W | L | CP | TP | AUT | HON | FRA | ESP |
|---|---|---|---|---|---|---|---|---|---|---|
| 1 | Markus Ragginger (AUT) | 3 | 3 | 0 | 11 | 6 | — | WO | 10–1 | 8–0 |
| 2 | Kevin Mejía (HON) | 3 | 2 | 1 | 11 | 11 | 0–5 IN | — | 8–0 | 8–0 |
| 3 | Loïc Samen (FRA) | 3 | 1 | 2 | 6 | 11 | 1–4 SU1 | 0–4 SU | — | 9–0 |
| 4 | José Ferrándiz (ESP) | 3 | 0 | 3 | 0 | 0 | 0–4 SU | 0–4 SU | 0–4 SU | — |

Source: UWW

| Pos | Athlete | Pld | W | L | CP | TP | EGY | ITA | KAZ |
|---|---|---|---|---|---|---|---|---|---|
| 1 | Mohamed Mostafa Ahmed (EGY) | 2 | 2 | 0 | 9 | 17 | — | 7–1 Fall | 8–0 |
| 2 | Simone Fidelbo (ITA) | 2 | 1 | 1 | 4 | 12 | 0–5 FA | — | 9–0 |
| 3 | Beibit Korganov (KAZ) | 2 | 0 | 2 | 2 | 3 | 0–4 SU | 0–4 SU | — |

Source: UWW

Semifinals
Markus Ragginger (AUT) | 9
Simone Fidelbo (ITA) | 0
Mohamed Mostafa Ahmed (EGY) | WO
Kevin Mejía (HON)

Final
Markus Ragginger (AUT) | 9
Mohamed Mostafa Ahmed (EGY) | 2
Bronze medal
Simone Fidelbo (ITA) | WO
Kevin Mejía (HON)

==== Men's Greco-Roman 130 kg ====
| Pos | Athlete | Pld | W | L | CP | TP | EGY | CZE | GRE | USA | KAZ |
|---|---|---|---|---|---|---|---|---|---|---|---|
| 1 | Abdellatif Mohamed (EGY) | 4 | 4 | 0 | 16 | 39 | — | 8–0 | 8–0 | 13–4 | 8–0 |
| 2 | Marcel Albini (CZE) | 4 | 3 | 1 | 13 | 19 | 0–4 SU | — | 11–1 Fall | 4–3 | 4–0 Fall |
| 3 | Nikolaos Ntounias (GRE) | 4 | 2 | 2 | 9 | 16 | 0–4 SU | 0–5 FA | — | 8–0 | 7–0 Fall |
| 4 | Courtney Freeman (USA) | 4 | 1 | 3 | 6 | 15 | 1–4 SU1 | 1–3 PO1 | 0–4 SU | — | 8–0 |
| 5 | Assar Amirov (KAZ) | 4 | 0 | 4 | 0 | 0 | 0–4 SU | 0–5 FA | 0–5 FA | 0–4 SU | — |

Source: UWW

=== Women's freestyle ===
==== Women's freestyle 50 kg ====
| Final |
| Mariia Tiumerekova (AIN) | 5 |
| Vinesh Phogat (IND) | 10 |

Round of 32

Round of 16
Maddie Mackenzie (CAN) | 3
Tetiana Profatilova (FRA) | 4
Anaya Falcon (USA) | 0
Mariia Tiumerekova (AIN) | 10
Ana Torres (ESP) | 10
Samantha Romero (CAN) | 0
Ibtissem Doudou (ALG) | WO
~~Nada Medani (EGY)~~

Quarterfinals
Tetiana Profatilova (FRA) | 0
Mariia Tiumerekova (AIN) | 3
Ana Torres (ESP) | 0
Ibtissem Doudou (ALG) | 10

Semifinals
Mariia Tiumerekova (AIN) | 10
Ibtissem Doudou (ALG) | 0

Round of 32
Madison Parks (CAN) | 4^{F}
Joséphine Haemmerle (FRA) | 0

Round of 16
Katie Dutchak (CAN) | 5^{F}
Laurie Lesaffre (FRA) | 0
Kim Jin-hee (KOR) | 5
Alisson Cardozo (COL) | 5
Yusneylys Guzmán (CUB) | 4
Vinesh Phogat (IND) | 12
Emma Luttenauer (FRA) | 6
Madison Parks (CAN) | 6

Quarterfinals
Katie Dutchak (CAN) | 11
Kim Jin-hee (KOR) | 0
Vinesh Phogat (IND) | 2^{F}
Madison Parks (CAN) | 0

Semifinals
Katie Dutchak (CAN) | 4
Vinesh Phogat (IND) | 9

Repechage round 2
Tetiana Profatilova (FRA) | 14^{F}
Anaya Falcon (USA) | 4
Madison Parks (CAN) | 11
Yusneylys Guzmán (CUB) | 11

Bronze medal match
Ibtissem Doudou (ALG) | 4
Tetiana Profatilova (FRA) | 10
Katie Dutchak (CAN) | WO
Madison Parks (CAN)

==== Women's freestyle 53 kg ====
| Quarterfinals | | Semifinals | | Final |
| Kaura Coles (CAN) | 2 |
| Cristelle Rodriguez (USA) | 13 | Cristelle Rodriguez (USA) | 8 |
| Samantha Stewart (CAN) | WO | Samantha Stewart (CAN) | 2 |
| ~~Betzabeth Argüello (VEN)~~ | | | | Cristelle Rodriguez (USA) | 2 |
| Karla Godinez (CAN) | 5 | | | Karla Godinez (CAN) | 3 |
| Brianna Gonzalez (USA) | 0 | Karla Godinez (CAN) | 3 |
| Serena Di Benedetto (CAN) | 6 | Christianah Ogunsanya (NGR) | 1 |
| Christianah Ogunsanya (NGR) | 14 |

Bronze medals
Kaura Coles (CAN)
Samantha Stewart (CAN) | WO
Brianna Gonzalez (USA) | 0
Christianah Ogunsanya (NGR) | 10

==== Women's freestyle 55 kg ====
| Pos | Athlete | Pld | W | L | CP | TP | FRA | ESP | KOR |
|---|---|---|---|---|---|---|---|---|---|
| 1 | Tatiana Debien (FRA) | 2 | 2 | 0 | 10 | 15 | — | 4–2 | 5–0 |
| 2 | Victoria Báez (ESP) | 2 | 1 | 1 | 4 | 13 | 1–3 PO1 | — | 2–2 |
| 3 | Jo Eun-so (KOR) | 2 | 0 | 2 | 0 | 0 | 0–3 PO | 1–3 PO1 | — |

Source: UWW

| Pos | Athlete | Pld | W | L | CP | TP | USA | CAN | KAZ |
|---|---|---|---|---|---|---|---|---|---|
| 1 | Carissa Qureshi (USA) | 2 | 1 | 1 | 5 | 11 | — | 10–0 | 6–0 |
| 2 | Kendall Dettloff (CAN) | 2 | 1 | 1 | 5 | 11 | 0–4 SU | — | 12–8 |
| 3 | Zulfiya Yakhyarova (KAZ) | 2 | 1 | 1 | 3 | 3 | 0–3 PO | 1–3 PO1 | — |

Source: UWW

Semifinals
Tatiana Debien (FRA) | 4^{F}
Kendall Dettloff (CAN) | 0
Carissa Qureshi (USA) | 0
Victoria Báez (ESP) | 7

Final
Tatiana Debien (FRA) | 4^{F}
Victoria Báez (ESP) | 2
Bronze medal
Kendall Dettloff (CAN) | 0
Carissa Qureshi (USA) | 2^{F}

==== Women's freestyle 57 kg ====
| Quarterfinals | | Semifinals | | Final |
| Ashley Wetzel (USA) | 0 |
| Laura Almaganbetova (KAZ) | 10 | Laura Almaganbetova (KAZ) | 11 |
| Chaimaa Aouissi (ALG) | 0 | Luisa Valverde (ECU) | 10^{F} |
| Luisa Valverde (ECU) | 10 | | | Luisa Valverde (ECU) | 10 |
| Mia Friesen (CAN) | 10 | | | Mia Friesen (CAN) | 0 |
| Marina Rueda (ESP) | 0 | Mia Friesen (CAN) | 2 |
| Céleste Sion (FRA) | 2 | Evelina Hulthén (SWE) | 0 |
| Evelina Hulthén (SWE) | 3 |

Bronze medals
Chaimaa Aouissi (ALG) | 0
Laura Almaganbetova (KAZ) | 5
Marina Rueda (ESP) | 6
Evelina Hulthén (SWE) | 13

==== Women's freestyle 59 kg ====
Round of 16
Odunayo Adekuoroye (NGR) | 11
Laurence Beauregard (CAN) | 6

Quarterfinals
Michaela Rankin (CAN) | 0
Alexis Janiak (USA) | 10
Anastasiia Sidelnikova (UWW) | 4
Diana Kayumova (KAZ) | 3
Anna Michalcová (CZE) | 0
Graciela Sánchez (ESP) | 10
Othelie Høie (NOR) | 4
Odunayo Adekuoroye (NGR) | 4

Semifinals
Alexis Janiak (USA) | 3
Anastasiia Sidelnikova (UWW) | 4
Graciela Sánchez (ESP) | 4
Othelie Høie (NOR) | 3

Final
Anastasiia Sidelnikova (UWW) | 10
Graciela Sánchez (ESP) | 0

Bronze medals
Alexis Janiak (USA) | 5
Diana Kayumova (KAZ) | 2
Othelie Høie (NOR) | 8
Anna Michalcová (CZE) | 0

==== Women's freestyle 62 kg ====
Round of 16
Bilyana Dudova (BUL) | 10
Sung Hwa-young (KOR) | 7
Iris Thiebaux (FRA) | 2
Johanna Lindborg (SWE) | 4

Quarterfinals
Cadence Diduch (USA) | 4
Lydia Pérez (ESP) | 4
Astrid Montero (VEN) | 10
Miren Huarte (ESP) | 0
Ella Doornaert (CAN) | 6
Esther Kolawole (NGR) | 13
Bilyana Dudova (BUL) | 4
Johanna Lindborg (SWE) | 0

Semifinals
Cadence Diduch (USA) | 0
Astrid Montero (VEN) | 10
Esther Kolawole (NGR) | 1
Bilyana Dudova (BUL) | 2

Final
Astrid Montero (VEN) | 5
Bilyana Dudova (BUL) | 1

Repechage round 1
Johanna Lindborg (SWE) | 9
Sung Hwa-young (KOR) | 2

Bronze medals
Cadence Diduch (USA) | 10
Miren Huarte (ESP) | 0
Esther Kolawole (NGR) | 8
Johanna Lindborg (SWE) | 0

==== Women's freestyle 65 kg ====
| Pos | Athlete | Pld | W | L | CP | TP | KAZ | USA | ESP | ESP |
|---|---|---|---|---|---|---|---|---|---|---|
| 1 | Irina Kazyulina (KAZ) | 3 | 3 | 0 | 15 | 10 | — | 4–4 Fall | 2–0 Fall | 4–0 Fall |
| 2 | Reese Larramendy (USA) | 3 | 2 | 1 | 9 | 24 | 0–5 FA | — | 10–0 | 10–0 Fall |
| 3 | Marta Ojeda (ESP) | 3 | 1 | 2 | 5 | 6 | 0–5 FA | 0–4 SU | — | 6–0 Fall |
| 4 | Manuela Noguerol (ESP) | 3 | 0 | 3 | 0 | 0 | 0–5 FA | 0–5 FA | 0–5 FA | — |

Source: UWW

| Pos | Athlete | Pld | W | L | CP | TP | FRA | CAN | NOR |
|---|---|---|---|---|---|---|---|---|---|
| 1 | Kendra Dacher (FRA) | 2 | 2 | 0 | 9 | 14 | — | 10–0 | 4–0 Fall |
| 2 | Jonelle Clarke (CAN) | 2 | 1 | 1 | 3 | 6 | 0–4 SU | — | 6–5 |
| 3 | Ingrid Skard (NOR) | 2 | 0 | 2 | 1 | 5 | 0–5 FA | 1–3 PO1 | — |

Source: UWW

Semifinals
Irina Kazyulina (KAZ) | 11
Jonelle Clarke (CAN) | 1
Kendra Dacher (FRA) | 10
Reese Larramendy (USA) | 7

Final
Irina Kazyulina (KAZ) | 2
Kendra Dacher (FRA) | 12
Bronze medal
Jonelle Clarke (CAN) | 0
Reese Larramendy (USA) | 10

==== Women's freestyle 68 kg ====
Quarterfinals
Caitlyn Davis (USA) | 0
Linda Morais (CAN) | 8^{F}
Tayla Ford (NZL) | 12^{F}
Nerea Pampín (ESP) | 4
Jasmine Robinson (USA) | 6
Aleah Nickel (CAN) | 1^{R}
~~Soleymi Caraballo (VEN)~~
Adéla Hanzlíčková (CZE) | WO

Semifinals
Linda Morais (CAN) | 4^{F}
Tayla Ford (NZL) | 2
Jasmine Robinson (USA) | 7
Adéla Hanzlíčková (CZE) | 7^{F}

Final
Linda Morais (CAN)
Adéla Hanzlíčková (CZE) | WO

Bronze medals
Caitlyn Davis (USA) | 0
Tayla Ford (NZL) | 4^{F}
~~Soleymi Caraballo (VEN)~~
Jasmine Robinson (USA) | WO

==== Women's freestyle 72 kg ====
| Pos | Athlete | Pld | W | L | CP | TP | FRA | USA | CAN |
|---|---|---|---|---|---|---|---|---|---|
| 1 | Pauline Lecarpentier (FRA) | 2 | 2 | 0 | 8 | 21 | — | 10–0 | 11–0 |
| 2 | Aspen Barber (USA) | 2 | 1 | 1 | 3 | 10 | 0–4 SU | — | 10–4 |
| 3 | Nyla Burgess (CAN) | 2 | 0 | 2 | 1 | 4 | 0–4 SU | 1–3 PO1 | — |

Source: UWW

| Pos | Athlete | Pld | W | L | CP | TP | USA | CAN | KAZ |
|---|---|---|---|---|---|---|---|---|---|
| 1 | Kylie Welker (USA) | 2 | 1 | 1 | 10 | 8 | — | 8–0 Fall | WO |
| 2 | Zhamila Bakbergenova (KAZ) | 2 | 1 | 1 | 5 | 0 | 0–5 FA | — | WO |
| — | Skylar Grote (USA) | 2 | 1 | 1 | 0 | 0 | 0–5 FO | 0–5 FO | — |

Source: UWW

Semifinals
Pauline Lecarpentier (FRA) | 2
Zhamila Bakbergenova (KAZ) | 4
Kylie Welker (USA) | 12
Aspen Barber (USA) | 0

Final
Zhamila Bakbergenova (KAZ) | 0
Kylie Welker (USA) | 7^{F}
Bronze medal
Pauline Lecarpentier (FRA) | 11
Aspen Barber (USA) | 0

==== Women's freestyle 76 kg ====
Round of 16
Milaimys Marín (CUB) | 13
Kennedy Blades (USA) | 4

Quarterfinals
Naomi Simon (USA) | 4
Elmira Syzdykova (KAZ) | 8
Brithany Luzuriaga (ESP) | 0
Brianna Fraser (CAN) | 2^{F}
Hannah Reuben (NGR) | 0
Tatiana Rentería (COL) | 3
Elvira Braun (SWE) | 0
Milaimys Marín (CUB) | 11^{F}

Semifinals
Elmira Syzdykova (KAZ) | 4^{F}
Brianna Fraser (CAN) | 3
Tatiana Rentería (COL) | 1
Milaimys Marín (CUB) | 4

Final
Elmira Syzdykova (KAZ) | 0
Milaimys Marín (CUB) | 6^{F}

Repechage round 1
Elvira Braun (SWE) | 0
Kennedy Blades (USA) | 10

Bronze medals
Brianna Fraser (CAN) | 4^{F}
Naomi Simon (USA) | 0
Tatiana Rentería (COL) | 0
Kennedy Blades (USA) | 8
