= Magomedrasul Asluev =

Russia born Bahraini freestyle wrestler

Personal information
- Full name: Magomedrasul Shahbanovich Asluev
- Born: Магомедрасул Шахбанович Аслуев; 5 January 2003 (age 23) Kizilyurt, Dagestan, Russia
- Height: 1.77 m (5 ft 10 in)
- Weight: 74 kg (163 lb; 11.7 st)

Sport
- Country: Russia (2019–2021); Bahrain (2022–present)
- Sport: Amateur wrestling
- Weight class: 74 kg
- Event: Freestyle
- Club: Abdulrashid Sadulaev Wrestling Club
- Coached by: Shamil Omarov
Medal record
Men's freestyle wrestling
Representing Bahrain
Asian Championships
| Silver medal – second place | 2026 Bishkek | 74 kg |
| Bronze medal – third place | 2023 Astana | 74 kg |
| Bronze medal – third place | 2025 Amman | 74 kg |
Islamic Solidarity Games
| Bronze medal – third place | 2025 Riyadh | 74 kg |
Yasar Dogu Tournament
| Bronze medal – third place | 2024 Antalya | 74 kg |
Grand Prix
| Gold medal – first place | 2025 Madrid | 74 kg |
| Bronze medal – third place | 2025 Budapest | 74 kg |
Arab Championships
| Gold medal – first place | 2022 Alexandria | 79 kg |
Representing Russia
European Juniors Championships
| Gold medal – first place | 2021 Dortmund | 79 kg |

Magomedrasul Asluev (Russian: Магомедрасул Шахбанович Аслуев; born 5 January 2003) is a Russian-born Bahraini wrestler.

== Career ==
He started wrestling at the Olympic wrestling school in Kizilyurt. In December 2017, he became a bronze medallist at the republican tournament among juniors in Khasavyurt. Later he started to represent the Kizilyurt school named after M. Bazarganov. M. Bazarganov. In March 2018, he won the Youth International Tournament " The Bear" in Minsk. In March 2021 he won the SCFD Junior Championship in Khasavyurt. In June 2021, he won the gold medal at the European Junior Championships in Dortmund, Germany.

Since November 2022, he has competed for Bahrain, making his debut on 4 November 2022 at the Dinmukhamed Kunayev Memorial International Tournament in Kazakhstan, where he was left without a medal. A few days later, as part of the Bahrain team in Egypt, he won the Arab Championships. On 14 April 2023 in Astana, defeating Adilet Zhaparkulov from Kyrgyzstan in the bout for 3rd place, he won the bronze medal of the Asian Championships.

He competed at the 2024 Asian Wrestling Olympic Qualification Tournament in Bishkek, Kyrgyzstan hoping to qualify for the 2024 Summer Olympics in Paris, France. He was eliminated in his first match and he did not qualify for the Olympics.
