= 2024 Yaşar Doğu Tournament =

Wrestling event in Turkey

Yaşar Doğu 2024
- Host city: Antalya, Turkey
- Dates: 7–10 March
- Stadium: Turgut Özal Sports Hall

Champions
- Freestyle: Iran
- Women: Japan

The 52nd Yaşar Doğu Tournament 2024, is a wrestling event was held in Antalya, Turkey between 7 and 10 March 2024 together with the 2024 Vehbi Emre & Hamit Kaplan Tournament.

The international tournament included competition in both men's and women's freestyle wrestling. The tournament is held in honor of Olympic Champion, Yaşar Doğu.

== Competition schedule ==
All times are (UTC+3)

Date	Time	Event
7 March	11.00-14.30	Qualification rounds & repechage GR – 55-63-72-82-97-130 kg & WW – 50-57-65-76 kg
7 March	17.00-19.00	Final matches and awarding ceremony: GR – 55-63-72-82-97-130 kg & WW – 50-57-65-76 kg
8 March	11.00-14.30	Qualification rounds & repechage GR – 60-67-77-87 kg & WW – 53-55-59-62-68-72 kg
8 March	17.00-19.00	Final matches and awarding ceremony: GR – 60-67-77-87 kg & WW – 53-55-59-62-68-72 kg
9 March	11.00-14.30	Qualification rounds & repechage FS – 57-65-74-86-97 kg
9 March	17.00-19.30	Final matches and awarding ceremony: Finals FS – 57-65-74-86-97 kg
10 March	11.00-14.30	Qualification rounds & repechage FS – 61-70-79-92-125 kg
10 March	17.00-19.30	Final matches and awarding ceremony: Finals FS – 61-70-79-92-125 kg

== Medal table ==
* Host nation (Turkey)

Rank	Nation	Gold	Silver	Bronze	Total
1	Japan	5	1	3	9
2	Kyrgyzstan	5	0	5	10
3	Iran	3	0	2	5
4	Mongolia	2	7	1	10
–	Individual Neutral Athletes	2	1	8	11
5	Bahrain	2	0	2	4
6	United States	1	1	0	2
7	Turkey*	0	3	3	6
8	Kazakhstan	0	2	5	7
9	Germany	0	1	2	3
10	Azerbaijan	0	1	1	2
10	Moldova	0	1	1	2
10	Tajikistan	0	1	1	2
13	Hungary	0	1	0	1
14	Uzbekistan	0	0	3	3
15	Georgia	0	0	2	2
Totals (15 entries)		20	20	39	79

== Team ranking ==
Rank	Men's freestyle		Women's freestyle	
Rank	Team	Points	Team	Points
1	Iran	115	Japan	135
2	Kyrgyzstan	111	Mongolia	133
3	Mongolia	108	Kazakhstan	122
4	Turkey	92	Turkey	115
5	Bahrain	80	Kyrgyzstan	65
6	United States	75	Germany	55
7	Japan	65	Uzbekistan	47
8	Azerbaijan	59	Hungary	30
9	Kazakhstan	51	United States	10
10	Georgia	50	—	—

== Medal overview ==
=== Men's freestyle ===
Event	Gold	Silver	Bronze
57 kg	Bekzat Almaz Uulu; Kyrgyzstan	Nachyn Mongush; Individual Neutral Athletes	Almaz Smanbekov; Kyrgyzstan
57 kg	Bekzat Almaz Uulu; Kyrgyzstan	Nachyn Mongush; Individual Neutral Athletes	Bekbolot Myrzanazar Uulu; Kyrgyzstan
61 kg	Masanosuke Ono; Japan	Emre Kural; Turkey	Behruzbey Turanmuratov; Uzbekistan
61 kg	Masanosuke Ono; Japan	Emre Kural; Turkey	Taiyrbek Zhumashbek Uulu; Kyrgyzstan
65 kg	Ulukbek Zholdoshbekov; Kyrgyzstan	Musa Aghayev; Azerbaijan	Mehdi Palangvar; Iran
65 kg	Ulukbek Zholdoshbekov; Kyrgyzstan	Musa Aghayev; Azerbaijan	Abdulmazhid Kudiev; Tajikistan
70 kg	Ernazar Akmataliev; Kyrgyzstan	Tömör-Ochiryn Tulga; Mongolia	Yoshinosuke Aoyagi; Japan
70 kg	Ernazar Akmataliev; Kyrgyzstan	Tömör-Ochiryn Tulga; Mongolia	Amir Mohammad Yazdani; Iran
74 kg	Jordan Burroughs; United States	Magomet Evloev; Tajikistan	Magomedrasul Asluev; Bahrain
74 kg	Jordan Burroughs; United States	Magomet Evloev; Tajikistan	Orozobek Toktomambetov; Kyrgyzstan
79 kg	Khidir Saipudinov; Bahrain	Enkhbayaryn Byambadorj; Mongolia	Ramazan Sarı; Turkey
79 kg	Khidir Saipudinov; Bahrain	Enkhbayaryn Byambadorj; Mongolia	Ramiz Hasanov; Azerbaijan
86 kg	Hadi Vafaeipour; Iran	Byambasürengiin Bat-Erdene; Mongolia	Bobur Islomov; Uzbekistan
86 kg	Hadi Vafaeipour; Iran	Byambasürengiin Bat-Erdene; Mongolia	Yudai Takahashi; Japan
92 kg	Amir Hossein Firouzpour; Iran	Andrian Grosul; Moldova	Muhammed Gimri; Turkey
92 kg	Amir Hossein Firouzpour; Iran	Andrian Grosul; Moldova	Giorgi Romelasvili; Georgia
97 kg	Akhmed Tazhudinov; Bahrain	Jonathan Aiello; United States	Radu Lefter; Moldova
97 kg	Akhmed Tazhudinov; Bahrain	Jonathan Aiello; United States	Rizabek Aitmukhan; Kazakhstan
125 kg	Amir Reza Masoumi; Iran	Mönkhtöriin Lkhagvagerel; Mongolia	Shamil Sharipov; Bahrain
125 kg	Amir Reza Masoumi; Iran	Mönkhtöriin Lkhagvagerel; Mongolia	Solomon Manashvili; Georgia

=== Women's freestyle ===
Event	Gold	Silver	Bronze
50 kg	Umi Ito; Japan	Evin Demirhan Yavuz; Turkey	Elizaveta Smirnova; Individual Neutral Athletes
50 kg	Umi Ito; Japan	Evin Demirhan Yavuz; Turkey	Nadezhda Sokolova; Individual Neutral Athletes
53 kg	Bat-Ochiryn Bolortuyaa; Mongolia	Zeynep Yetgil; Turkey	Natalia Malysheva; Individual Neutral Athletes
53 kg	Bat-Ochiryn Bolortuyaa; Mongolia	Zeynep Yetgil; Turkey	Shokhida Akhmedova; Uzbekistan
55 kg	Ekaterina Verbina; Individual Neutral Athletes	Mönkhboldyn Dölgöön; Mongolia	Esra Pul; Turkey
55 kg	Ekaterina Verbina; Individual Neutral Athletes	Mönkhboldyn Dölgöön; Mongolia	Sevil Nazarova; Individual Neutral Athletes
57 kg	Olga Khoroshavtseva; Individual Neutral Athletes	Narumi Nakamura; Japan	Sandra Paruszewski; Germany
57 kg	Olga Khoroshavtseva; Individual Neutral Athletes	Narumi Nakamura; Japan	Emma Tissina; Kazakhstan
59 kg	Miyu Nakanishi; Japan	Khürelkhüügiin Bolortuyaa; Mongolia	Kalmira Bilimbekova; Kyrgyzstan
59 kg	Miyu Nakanishi; Japan	Khürelkhüügiin Bolortuyaa; Mongolia	Guldana Bekesh; Kazakhstan
62 kg	Aisuluu Tynybekova; Kyrgyzstan	Irina Kuznetsova; Kazakhstan	Amina Tandelova; Individual Neutral Athletes
62 kg	Aisuluu Tynybekova; Kyrgyzstan	Irina Kuznetsova; Kazakhstan	Alina Kasabieva; Individual Neutral Athletes
65 kg	Mahiro Yoshitake; Japan	Tüvshinjargalyn Enkhjin; Mongolia	Zlatoslava Stepanova; Individual Neutral Athletes
68 kg	Enkhsaikhany Delgermaa; Mongolia	Noémi Szabados; Hungary	Khanum Velieva; Individual Neutral Athletes
68 kg	Enkhsaikhany Delgermaa; Mongolia	Noémi Szabados; Hungary	Yelena Shalygina; Kazakhstan
72 kg	Sumire Niikura; Japan	Jennifer Rösler; Germany	Lilly Schneider; Germany
72 kg	Sumire Niikura; Japan	Jennifer Rösler; Germany	Shamshiyabanu Tastanbek; Kazakhstan
76 kg	Aiperi Medet Kyzy; Kyrgyzstan	Elmira Syzdykova; Kazakhstan	Nodoka Yamamoto; Japan
76 kg	Aiperi Medet Kyzy; Kyrgyzstan	Elmira Syzdykova; Kazakhstan	Naigalsürengiin Zagardulam; Mongolia

== Participating nations ==
343 wrestlers from 22 countries:

1. Individual Neutral Athletes (21)
2. Azerbaijan (14)
3. Belgium (1)
4. Bahrain (5)
5. Georgia (23)
6. Germany (19)
7. Hungary (3)
8. Iran (12)
9. Italy (1)
10. Japan (17)
11. Kazakhstan (46)
12. Kyrgyzstan (19)
13. Moldova (8)
14. Mongolia (33)
15. North Macedonia (2)
16. Netherlands (1)
17. Romania (2)
18. Serbia (1)
19. Tajikistan (5)
20. Turkmenistan (4)
21. Turkey (70) (Host)
22. United States (17)
23. Uzbekistan (19)

== Results ==
Legend

- C — Won by 3 cautions given to the opponent
- DSQ — Disqualified
- F — Won by fall
- R — Retired
- WO — Won by walkover

=== Men's freestyle ===
==== Men's freestyle 57 kg ====
Final
Nachyn Mongush (AIN)	1
Bekzat Almaz Uulu (KGZ)	2

Round of 32
Bekir Keser (TUR)	2
Muhammet Karavuş (TUR)	4^{R}
Almaz Smanbekov (KGZ)	10
Aiaal Belolyubskii (TJK)	0

Round of 16
Daniel DeShazer (USA)	2
Nachyn Mongush (AIN)	5
Bekir Keser (TUR)	16
Brandon Courtney (USA)	6
Nika Zangaladze (GEO)	0
Almaz Smanbekov (KGZ)	12
Liam Cronin (USA)	0
Azamat Tuskaev (SRB)	10

Quarterfinals
Nachyn Mongush (AIN)	10
Bekir Keser (TUR)	0
Almaz Smanbekov (KGZ)	3
Azamat Tuskaev (SRB)	0

Semifinals
Nachyn Mongush (AIN)	10
Almaz Smanbekov (KGZ)	2

Round of 32
Luke Lilledahl (USA)	2
Beka Bujiashvili (GEO)	8
Batkhuyagiin Mönkh-Erdene (MGL)	10
Meirambek Kartbay (KAZ)	0

Round of 16
Bekzat Almaz Uulu (KGZ)	2^{F}
Ebrahim Khari (IRI)	2
Beka Bujiashvili (GEO)	6
Bekbolot Myrzanazar Uulu (KGZ)	8^{F}
Rakhat Kalzhan (KAZ)	4^{F}
Batkhuyagiin Mönkh-Erdene (MGL)	3
Kento Yumiya (JPN)	13
Assylzhan Yessengeldi (KAZ)	3

Quarterfinals
Bekzat Almaz Uulu (KGZ)	4
Bekbolot Myrzanazar Uulu (KGZ)	1
Rakhat Kalzhan (KAZ)	11
Kento Yumiya (JPN)	7

Semifinals
Bekzat Almaz Uulu (KGZ)	3
Rakhat Kalzhan (KAZ)	0

Repechage round 1
Daniel DeShazer (USA)	5
Bekir Keser (TUR)	0
Ebrahim Khari (IRI)	1
Bekbolot Myrzanazar Uulu (KGZ)	4^{F}

Bronze medal match
Daniel DeShazer (USA)	1
Almaz Smanbekov (KGZ)	3
Bekbolot Myrzanazar Uulu (KGZ)	6
Rakhat Kalzhan (KAZ)	4

==== Men's freestyle 61 kg ====
Final
Emre Kural (TUR)	0
Masanosuke Ono (JPN)	10

Round of 32
Kuat Amirtayev (KAZ)	0
Emre Kural (TUR)	5
Assyl Aitakyn (KAZ)	3
Recep Topal (TUR)	3
Enkhbatyn Enkhbold (MGL)	3
Vladimir Egorov (MKD)	4
Emrah Ormanoğlu (TUR)	13
Jeyhun Allahverdiyev (AZE)	2
Leonid Colesnic (MDA)	10
Giorgi Goniashvili (GEO)	0
Behruzbey Turanmuratov (UZB)	WO
Gulomjon Abdullaev (UZB)

Round of 16
Taylor LaMont (USA)	2
Emre Kural (TUR)	3
Recep Topal (TUR)	3
Vladimir Egorov (MKD)	1
Emrah Ormanoğlu (TUR)	2
Leonid Colesnic (MDA)	9
Behruzbey Turanmuratov (UZB)	16
Nebi Uzun (TUR)	14

Quarterfinals
Emre Kural (TUR)	11
Recep Topal (TUR)	0
Leonid Colesnic (MDA)	9
Behruzbey Turanmuratov (UZB)	14

Semifinals
Emre Kural (TUR)	3
Behruzbey Turanmuratov (UZB)	2

Round of 32
Reza Momeni (IRI)	5
Dauren Amirkhan (KAZ)	3
Taiyrbek Zhumashbek Uulu (KGZ)	6
Daviti Abdaladze (GEO)	0
Masanosuke Ono (JPN)	6
Ossimzhan Dastanbek (KAZ)	2
Sardor Ruzimov (UZB)	11
Muhammet Ali Kesti (TUR)	0
Shynggyskhan Zhantassuly (KAZ)	2
Kyler Larkin (USA)	3
Reza Atri (IRI)	10^{F}
Simone Piroddu (ITA)	1

Round of 16
Zandanbudyn Zanabazar (MGL)	4
Reza Momeni (IRI)	8
Taiyrbek Zhumashbek Uulu (KGZ)	0
Masanosuke Ono (JPN)	11
Sardor Ruzimov (UZB)	8
Kyler Larkin (USA)	9
Reza Atri (IRI)	12
Şaban Kızıltaş (TUR)	0

Quarterfinals
Reza Momeni (IRI)	0
Masanosuke Ono (JPN)	11
Kyler Larkin (USA)	2
Reza Atri (IRI)	3

Semifinals
Masanosuke Ono (JPN)	4
Reza Atri (IRI)	0

Repechage round 1
Kuat Amirtayev (KAZ)	14
Taylor LaMont (USA)	1
Ossimzhan Dastanbek (KAZ)	0
Taiyrbek Zhumashbek Uulu (KGZ)	7^{F}

Repechage round 2
Kuat Amirtayev (KAZ)	2
Recep Topal (TUR)	3
Taiyrbek Zhumashbek Uulu (KGZ)	6
Reza Momeni (IRI)	1

Bronze medals
Recep Topal (TUR)	3
Behruzbey Turanmuratov (UZB)	6
Taiyrbek Zhumashbek Uulu (KGZ)	9
Reza Atri (IRI)	4

==== Men's freestyle 65 kg ====
Final
Ulukbek Zholdoshbekov (KGZ)	8
Musa Aghayev (AZE)	1

Round of 32
Davit Kobuladze (GEO)	2
Anthony Ashnault (USA)	12
Ahmet Duman (TUR)	3
Ali Khorramdel (IRI)	6
Ziraddin Bayramov (AZE)	6
Umidjon Jalolov (UZB)	2
Ulukbek Zholdoshbekov (KGZ)	WO
~~Ilyas Abdurashidov (BEL)~~

Round of 16
Nika Zakashvili (GEO)	1
Anthony Ashnault (USA)	9^{F}
Ali Khorramdel (IRI)	0
Adlan Askarov (KAZ)	10
Sanzhar Mukhtar (KAZ)	4
Ziraddin Bayramov (AZE)	6
Ulukbek Zholdoshbekov (KGZ)	11
Mehdi Palangvar (IRI)	0

Quarterfinals
Anthony Ashnault (USA)	4
Adlan Askarov (KAZ)	5
Ziraddin Bayramov (AZE)	0
Ulukbek Zholdoshbekov (KGZ)	7

Semifinals
Adlan Askarov (KAZ)	2
Ulukbek Zholdoshbekov (KGZ)	9

Round of 32
Musa Aghayev (AZE)	4
Giorgi Shonia (GEO)	0
James Green (USA)	4
Makoto Hosokawa (JPN)	1
Fatih Önalan (TUR)	0
Kaleb Larkin (USA)	10
Abdulmazhid Kudiev (TJK)	10
Shamil Mamedov (AIN)	0

Round of 16
Murad Hagverdiyev (AZE)	1
Musa Aghayev (AZE)	2
James Green (USA)	6
Alibeg Alibegov (BHR)	2
Cavit Acar (TUR)	6
Kaleb Larkin (USA)	12
Abdulmazhid Kudiev (TJK)	14
Jelaletdin Seýidow (TKM)	3

Quarterfinals
Musa Aghayev (AZE)	6
James Green (USA)	3
Kaleb Larkin (USA)	5
Abdulmazhid Kudiev (TJK)	10

Semifinals
Musa Aghayev (AZE)	3
Abdulmazhid Kudiev (TJK)	2

Repechage round 1
~~Ilyas Abdurashidov (BEL)~~
Mehdi Palangvar (IRI)	WO
Giorgi Shonia (GEO)	4
Murad Hagverdiyev (AZE)	6

Repechage round 2
Mehdi Palangvar (IRI)	5
Ziraddin Bayramov (AZE)	0
Murad Hagverdiyev (AZE)	6
James Green (USA)	14

Bronze medals
Mehdi Palangvar (IRI)	7
Adlan Askarov (KAZ)	6
James Green (USA)	0
Abdulmazhid Kudiev (TJK)	4^{F}

==== Men's freestyle 70 kg ====
Final
Ernazar Akmataliev (KGZ)	10^{F}
Tömör-Ochiryn Tulga (MGL)	2

Round of 32
Tsermaagiin Chinzorig (MGL)	4
Doszhan Assetov (KAZ)	3
Ömer Faruk Çayır (TUR)	7
Maxim Saculțan (MDA)	9
Yoshinosuke Aoyagi (JPN)	5
Faruk Kırtepe (TUR)	1

Round of 16
Ernazar Akmataliev (KGZ)	7
Alibek Osmonov (KGZ)	6
Tsermaagiin Chinzorig (MGL)	0
Mustafo Akhmedov (TJK)	6
Sabir Jafarov (AZE)	2
Maxim Saculțan (MDA)	1
Yoshinosuke Aoyagi (JPN)	10
Begijon Kuldashev (UZB)	0

Quarterfinals
Ernazar Akmataliev (KGZ)	3^{F}
Mustafo Akhmedov (TJK)	2
Sabir Jafarov (AZE)	6
Yoshinosuke Aoyagi (JPN)	12

Semifinals
Ernazar Akmataliev (KGZ)	8
Yoshinosuke Aoyagi (JPN)	6

Round of 32
Davit Patsinashvili (GEO)	0
Haydar Yavuz (TUR)	4
Edemi Bolkvadze (GEO)	0
Tömör-Ochiryn Tulga (MGL)	10
Erdenebatyn Tögsjargal (MGL)	12
Abbos Rakhmonov (UZB)	2
Mohammad-Ali Amouzad (IRI)	2
Amir Mohammad Yazdani (IRI)	6

Round of 16
Magomed Khaniev (AZE)	11
Haydar Yavuz (TUR)	0
Tömör-Ochiryn Tulga (MGL)	8
Kuanysh Duisenkul (KAZ)	0
Enes Uslu (TUR)	10
Erdenebatyn Tögsjargal (MGL)	0
Amir Mohammad Yazdani (IRI)	10
Wyatt Sheets (USA)	0

Quarterfinals
Magomed Khaniev (AZE)	5
Tömör-Ochiryn Tulga (MGL)	7
Enes Uslu (TUR)	3
Amir Mohammad Yazdani (IRI)	7

Semifinals
Tömör-Ochiryn Tulga (MGL)	15
Amir Mohammad Yazdani (IRI)	10

Repechage round 1
Edemi Bolkvadze (GEO)	1
Kuanysh Duisenkul (KAZ)	1

Repechage round 2
Alibek Osmonov (KGZ)	2
Mustafo Akhmedov (TJK)	6
Edemi Bolkvadze (GEO)	4
Magomed Khaniev (AZE)	6

Bronze medals
Alibek Osmonov (KGZ)	0
Yoshinosuke Aoyagi (JPN)	10
Magomed Khaniev (AZE)	1
Amir Mohammad Yazdani (IRI)	11

==== Men's freestyle 74 kg ====
Final
Magomet Evloev (TJK)	0
Jordan Burroughs (USA)	8

Round of 32
Daniyar Kaisanov (KAZ)	0^{R}
Sevjidbalsangiin Khürelbaatar (MGL)	0
Fazlı Eryılmaz (TUR)	12
Luka Chkhitunidze (GEO)	2
Vasile Diacon (MDA)	3
Hossein Abouzari (IRI)	1
İsmet Çiftçi (TUR)	0
Daiju Suzuki (JPN)	13
Magomet Evloev (TJK)	5
Metehan Yaprak (TUR)	5
Giorgi Burjanadze (GEO)	0
Magomedrasul Asluev (BHR)	10

Round of 16
Alan Golmohammadi (GER)	10
Sevjidbalsangiin Khürelbaatar (MGL)	0
Fazlı Eryılmaz (TUR)	7
Vasile Diacon (MDA)	0
Daiju Suzuki (JPN)	0
Magomet Evloev (TJK)	2^{F}
Magomedrasul Asluev (BHR)	10
Arslan Amanmyradow (TKM)	0

Quarterfinals
Alan Golmohammadi (GER)	1
Fazlı Eryılmaz (TUR)	11
Magomet Evloev (TJK)	5
Magomedrasul Asluev (BHR)	3

Semifinals
Fazlı Eryılmaz (TUR)	1^{R}
Magomet Evloev (TJK)	2

Round of 32
Zurab Kapraev (ROU)	2
Murad Evloev (AZE)	3
Batsükhiin Batbayar (MGL)	11^{F}
Mirzo Khayitov (UZB)	2
Shamil Ustaev (GER)	1
Muhammed Ozmuş (TUR)	4
Sanzhar Doszhanov (KAZ)	3
Orozobek Toktomambetov (KGZ)	4
Viktor Rassadin (TJK)	12
Pouria Taherkhani (GER)	7
Murat Dzhakupov (KAZ)	4
Olonbayaryn Süldkhüü (MGL)	6

Round of 16
Jordan Burroughs (USA)	9
Murad Evloev (AZE)	2
Batsükhiin Batbayar (MGL)	2
Muhammed Ozmuş (TUR)	6
Orozobek Toktomambetov (KGZ)	WO
Viktor Rassadin (TJK)
Olonbayaryn Süldkhüü (MGL)	6
Dzhabrail Gadzhiev (AZE)	8

Quarterfinals
Jordan Burroughs (USA)	8
Muhammed Ozmuş (TUR)	1
Orozobek Toktomambetov (KGZ)	3
Dzhabrail Gadzhiev (AZE)	2

Semifinals
Jordan Burroughs (USA)	5
Orozobek Toktomambetov (KGZ)	2

Repechage round 1
Metehan Yaprak (TUR)	4
Daiju Suzuki (JPN)	2

Repechage round 2
Metehan Yaprak (TUR)	3
Magomedrasul Asluev (BHR)	11
Murad Evloev (AZE)	4
Muhammed Ozmuş (TUR)	5

Bronze medals
Magomedrasul Asluev (BHR)	WO
Fazlı Eryılmaz (TUR)
Muhammed Ozmuş (TUR)	0
Orozobek Toktomambetov (KGZ)	4

==== Men's freestyle 79 kg ====
Final
Khidir Saipudinov (BHR)	14
Enkhbayaryn Byambadorj (MGL)	4

Round of 32
Khidir Saipudinov (BHR)	11
Adilet Maratbaev (KGZ)	0
Cengizhan Doğan (TUR)	0
Ashraf Ashirov (AZE)	11

Round of 16
Gurbanmyrat Öwezberdiýew (TKM)	10
Mukhammad Abdullaev (KGZ)	0
Khidir Saipudinov (BHR)	9^{F}
Zhiger Zakirov (KAZ)	0
Kamiya Ryunosuke (JPN)	0
Ashraf Ashirov (AZE)	9
Piruzi Kvlividze (GEO)	1
Ramazan Sarı (TUR)	6

Quarterfinals
Gurbanmyrat Öwezberdiýew (TKM)	2
Khidir Saipudinov (BHR)	13
Ashraf Ashirov (AZE)	2
Ramazan Sarı (TUR)	8

Semifinals
Khidir Saipudinov (BHR)	9
Ramazan Sarı (TUR)	2

Round of 32
~~Iakub Shikhdzamalov (ROU)~~
Ramiz Hasanov (AZE)	WO
Daulet Yergesh (KAZ)	8
Eugeniu Mihalcean (MDA)	7

Round of 16
Muhammet Nuri Kotanoğlu (TUR)	2
Enkhbayaryn Byambadorj (MGL)	14
Ramiz Hasanov (AZE)	11
Otari Adeishvili (GEO)	4
İsa Demir (TUR)	0
Daulet Yergesh (KAZ)	12
Otari Bagauri (GEO)	5
Muhammet Akdeniz (TUR)	6

Quarterfinals
Enkhbayaryn Byambadorj (MGL)	11
Ramiz Hasanov (AZE)	0
Daulet Yergesh (KAZ)	7
Muhammet Akdeniz (TUR)	9

Semifinals
Enkhbayaryn Byambadorj (MGL)	11
Muhammet Akdeniz (TUR)	3

Repechage round 1
Adilet Maratbaev (KGZ)	7
Zhiger Zakirov (KAZ)	13

Repechage round 2
Zhiger Zakirov (KAZ)	9
Gurbanmyrat Öwezberdiýew (TKM)	4
Muhammet Nuri Kotanoğlu (TUR)	2
Ramiz Hasanov (AZE)	9

Bronze medals
Zhiger Zakirov (KAZ)	1
Ramazan Sarı (TUR)	12
Ramiz Hasanov (AZE)	10
Muhammet Akdeniz (TUR)	0

==== Men's freestyle 86 kg ====
Round of 16
Aidyn Tazhigali (KAZ)	1
Nurtilek Karypbaev (KGZ)	5
Amir Sheikh Hosseini (NED)	0
Bobur Islomov (UZB)	11^{F}
Joshua Morodion (GER)	8
Ivan Ichizli (MDA)	2
Atai Izabekov (KGZ)	1
Byambasürengiin Bat-Erdene (MGL)	5
Evsem Shvelidze (GEO)	9
Harun Kılıç (TUR)	6
Daviti Koguashvili (GEO)	6
Lars Schäfle (GER)	10
Yudai Takahashi (JPN)	13
Naadambatyn Batbilgüün (MGL)	2
Hadi Vafaeipour (IRI)	10
Nurzhan Issagaliyev (KAZ)	0

Quarterfinals
Nurtilek Karypbaev (KGZ)	1
Bobur Islomov (UZB)	8
Joshua Morodion (GER)	4
Byambasürengiin Bat-Erdene (MGL)	4
Evsem Shvelidze (GEO)	6
Lars Schäfle (GER)	2
Yudai Takahashi (JPN)	4
Hadi Vafaeipour (IRI)	9

Semifinals
Bobur Islomov (UZB)	5
Byambasürengiin Bat-Erdene (MGL)	5
Evsem Shvelidze (GEO)	1
Hadi Vafaeipour (IRI)	11

Final
Byambasürengiin Bat-Erdene (MGL)	0
Hadi Vafaeipour (IRI)	10

Repechage round
Atai Izabekov (KGZ)	0
Joshua Morodion (GER)	7
Nurzhan Issagaliyev (KAZ)	7
Yudai Takahashi (JPN)	8

Bronze medal matc
Joshua Morodion (GER)	0
Bobur Islomov (UZB)	4
Yudai Takahashi (JPN)	4
Evsem Shvelidze (GEO)	2

==== Men's freestyle 92 kg ====
Round of 16
Nurbolot Adyl Uulu (KGZ)	0
Abduljalil Shabanov (AZE)	9
Amir Hossein Firouzpour (IRI)	10
Damjingiin Batzul (MGL)	0
Yeskali Dauletkazy (KAZ)
Shamil Zubairov (AZE)	WO
Muhammed Gimri (TUR)	4
Ion Demian (MDA)	3
Andrian Grosul (MDA)	8^{F}
Gan-Ochiryn Dayanbileg (MGL)	1
Narmandakhyn Shinetör (MGL)	2
Giorgi Romelasvili (GEO)	6^{F}
Sherzod Poyonov (UZB)	4
Iuza Tsertsvadze (GEO)	4
Andro Margishvili (GEO)	10
Shoken Yoshida (JPN)	0

Quarterfinals
Abduljalil Shabanov (AZE)	0
Amir Hossein Firouzpour (IRI)	11
Shamil Zubairov (AZE)	2
Muhammed Gimri (TUR)	4
Andrian Grosul (MDA)	12^{F}
Giorgi Romelasvili (GEO)	1
Iuza Tsertsvadze (GEO)	6
Andro Margishvili (GEO)	9

Semifinals
Amir Hossein Firouzpour (IRI)	7
Muhammed Gimri (TUR)	0
Andrian Grosul (MDA)	0
Andro Margishvili (GEO)	1^{R}

Final
Amir Hossein Firouzpour (IRI)	11^{F}
Andrian Grosul (MDA)	1

Repechage round
Damjingiin Batzul (MGL)	11
Abduljalil Shabanov (AZE)	3^{R}
Dayanbileg Gan-Ochir (MGL)	2
Giorgi Romelasvili (GEO)	5

Bronze medal match
Damjingiin Batzul (MGL)	1
Muhammed Gimri (TUR)	5
Giorgi Romelasvili (GEO)	WO
Andro Margishvili (GEO)

==== Men's freestyle 97 kg ====
Final
Jonathan Aiello (USA)	0
Akhmed Tazhudinov (BHR)	10

Round of 32
Andrey Aronov (KGZ)	4
Radu Lefter (MDA)	6

Round of 16
Emirhan Kılıç (TUR)	4
Burak Şahin (TUR)	4
Radu Lefter (MDA)	4^{F}
Gadzhimurad Magomedsaidov (AZE)	11
Ertuğrul Ağca (GER)	2
İbrahim Çiftçi (TUR)	0^{R}
Merab Suleimanishvili (GEO)	3
Jonathan Aiello (USA)	11^{F}

Quarterfinals
Emirhan Kılıç (TUR)	1
Radu Lefter (MDA)	8
Ertuğrul Ağca (GER)	2
Jonathan Aiello (USA)	8

Semifinals
Radu Lefter (MDA)	6
Jonathan Aiello (USA)	17

Round of 32
Toyoki Hamada (JPN)	0
Rizabek Aitmukhan (KAZ)	10
Ganbaataryn Gankhuyag (MGL)	5
Doğan Uzun (TUR)	4

Round of 16
Mehmet Emin Demir (TUR)	10
Şatlyk Hemelýäýew (TKM)	11
Rizabek Aitmukhan (KAZ)	11^{F}
Saba Gamtenadze (GEO)	0
Akhmed Tazhudinov (BHR)	7
Ganbaataryn Gankhuyag (MGL)	1
Magomedgaji Nurov (MKD)	1
Kollin Moore (USA)	4

Quarterfinals
Şatlyk Hemelýäýew (TKM)	0
Rizabek Aitmukhan (KAZ)	10
Akhmed Tazhudinov (BHR)	11
Kollin Moore (USA)	0

Semifinals
Rizabek Aitmukhan (KAZ)	3
Akhmed Tazhudinov (BHR)	9^{F}

Repechage round 2
Merab Suleimanishvili (GEO)	8
Ertuğrul Ağca (GER)	3
Ganbaataryn Gankhuyag (MGL)	0
Kollin Moore (USA)	2

Bronze medal match
Merab Suleimanishvili (GEO)	0
Radu Lefter (MDA)	10^{F}
Kollin Moore (USA)	12
Rizabek Aitmukhan (KAZ)	14

==== Men's freestyle 125 kg ====
Final
Mönkhtöriin Lkhagvagerel (MGL)	3
Amir Reza Masoumi (IRI)	4

Round of 32
Nika Berulava (GEO)	11^{F}
Efe Anıl Al (TUR)	3

Round of 16
Mohammad Reza Lotfi (IRI)	2
Mönkhtöriin Lkhagvagerel (MGL)	4
Nika Berulava (GEO)	6
Omar Eyubov (KAZ)	5
Aykhan Mardanov (AZE)	12
Riku Nakahara (JPN)	2
Batkhishigiin Odgerel (MGL)	0
Shamil Sharipov (BHR)	10

Quarterfinals
Mönkhtöriin Lkhagvagerel (MGL)	10
Nika Berulava (GEO)	0
Aykhan Mardanov (AZE)	0
Shamil Sharipov (BHR)	4^{F}

Semifinals
Mönkhtöriin Lkhagvagerel (MGL)	8^{F}
Shamil Sharipov (BHR)	2

Round of 32
Fatih Yaşarlı (TUR)	3
Solomon Manashvili (GEO)	10

Round of 16
Trent Hillger (USA)	6
Aiaal Lazarev (KGZ)	0
Hakan Büyükçıngıl (TUR)	10
Sardorbek Kholmatov (UZB)	0
Gary Traub (USA)	0
Solomon Manashvili (GEO)	10
Amir Reza Masoumi (IRI)	11
Oktay Çiftçi (TUR)	0

Quarterfinals
Trent Hillger (USA)	4
Hakan Büyükçıngıl (TUR)	10
Solomon Manashvili (GEO)	0
Amir Reza Masoumi (IRI)	11

Semifinals
Hakan Büyükçıngıl (TUR)	0
Amir Reza Masoumi (IRI)	4

Repechage round
Mohammad Reza Lotfi (IRI)	11
Nika Berulava (GEO)	0
Oktay Çiftçi (TUR)	8
Solomon Manashvili (GEO)	12^{F}

Bronze medal match
Mohammad Reza Lotfi (IRI)	1
Shamil Sharipov (BHR)	5^{F}
Solomon Manashvili (GEO)	6
Hakan Büyükçıngıl (TUR)	5

=== Women's freestyle ===
==== Women's freestyle 50 kg ====
Round of 16
Elizaveta Smirnova (AIN)	8
Umi Ito (JPN)	12
Mariia Tiumerekova (AIN)	10
Mönkhbatyn Mönkhgerel (MGL)	1
Zerda Demir (TUR)	5
Aktenge Keunimjaeva (UZB)	9
Irina Zhanibekova (KAZ)	0
Evin Demirhan Yavuz (TUR)	10
Zehra Demirhan (TUR)	0
Nadezhda Sokolova (AIN)	4^{F}
Fatma Kızmaz (TUR)	1
Emine Çataloğlu (TUR)	2
Jasmina Immaeva (UZB)	2
Laura Ganikyzy (KAZ)	1

Quarterfinals
Svetlana Ankicheva (KAZ)	0
Umi Ito (JPN)	11
Mariia Tiumerekova (AIN)	5
Aktenge Keunimjaeva (UZB)	4
Evin Demirhan Yavuz (TUR)	2
Nadezhda Sokolova (AIN)	1
Emine Çataloğlu (TUR)	0
Jasmina Immaeva (UZB)	8

Semifinals
Umi Ito (JPN)	10
Mariia Tiumerekova (AIN)	4
Evin Demirhan Yavuz (TUR)	6^{F}
Jasmina Immaeva (UZB)	0

Final
Umi Ito (JPN)	WO
Evin Demirhan Yavuz (TUR)

Repechage round
Elizaveta Smirnova (AIN)	9
Svetlana Ankicheva (KAZ)	1
Irina Zhanibekova (KAZ)	1
Nadezhda Sokolova (AIN)	11

Bronze medal match
Elizaveta Smirnova (AIN)	7
Mariia Tiumerekova (AIN)	6
Nadezhda Sokolova (AIN)	10
Jasmina Immaeva (UZB)	2

==== Women's freestyle 53 kg ====
Final
Bat-Ochiryn Bolortuyaa (MGL)	6^{F}
Zeynep Yetgil (TUR)	2

Round of 32
Zhuldyz Eshimova (KAZ)	2
Irina Ologonova (AIN)	3

Round of 16
Marina Sedneva (KAZ)	0
Natalia Malysheva (AIN)	3
Irina Ologonova (AIN)	10
Rahime Arı (TUR)	0
Chinboldyn Otgontuyaa (MGL)	11
Zeinep Bayanova (KAZ)	0
Şevval Çayır (TUR)	11
Bat-Ochiryn Bolortuyaa (MGL)	6^{F}

Quarterfinals
Natalia Malysheva (AIN)	1
Irina Ologonova (AIN)	1
Chinboldyn Otgontuyaa (MGL)	0
Bat-Ochiryn Bolortuyaa (MGL)	4^{F}

Semifinals
Natalia Malysheva (AIN)	0
Bat-Ochiryn Bolortuyaa (MGL)	11

Round of 32

Round of 16
Ayazhan Markasheva (KAZ)	5
Natia Svanidze (AIN)	7
Shokhida Akhmedova (UZB)	8
Sıla Aykul (TUR)	2
Dilshoda Matnazarova (UZB)	8
Nina Hemmer (GER)	12
Aynur Erge (TUR)	0
Zeynep Yetgil (TUR)	11

Quarterfinals
Natia Svanidze (AIN)	2
Shokhida Akhmedova (UZB)	9
Nina Hemmer (GER)	3
Zeynep Yetgil (TUR)	7

Semifinals
Shokhida Akhmedova (UZB)	4
Zeynep Yetgil (TUR)	8

Repechage round
Chinboldyn Otgontuyaa (MGL)	16
Şevval Çayır (TUR)	10
Aynur Erge (TUR)	0
Nina Hemmer (GER)	7

Bronze medal match
Chinboldyn Otgontuyaa (MGL)	2
Natalia Malysheva (AIN)	5
Nina Hemmer (GER)	1
Shokhida Akhmedova (UZB)	6

==== Women's freestyle 55 kg ====
Round of 16
Mönkhboldyn Dölgöön (MGL)	7
Ainur Ashimova (KAZ)	5
Josefine Purschke (GER)	2
Tuba Demir (TUR)	4
Ekaterina Verbina (AIN)	8
Bayanmönkhiin Otgontuyaa (MGL)	4

Quarterfinals
Büşra Cengiz (TUR)	2
Mönkhboldyn Dölgöön (MGL)	7^{F}
Sinem Köroğlu (TUR)	3
Esra Pul (TUR)	5
Sevil Nazarova (AIN)	12
Tuba Demir (TUR)	5
Ekaterina Verbina (AIN)	10
Amory Andrich (GER)	0

Semifinals
Mönkhboldyn Dölgöön (MGL)	4
Esra Pul (TUR)	2
Sevil Nazarova (AIN)	2
Ekaterina Verbina (AIN)	9

Final
Mönkhboldyn Dölgöön (MGL)	3
Ekaterina Verbina (AIN)	14

Repechage round
Ainur Ashimova (KAZ)	10
Büşra Cengiz (TUR)	0
Bayanmönkhiin Otgontuyaa (MGL)	10^{F}
Amory Andrich (GER)	0

Bronze medal match
Ainur Ashimova (KAZ)	1
Esra Pul (TUR)	2
Bayanmönkhiin Otgontuyaa (MGL)	10
Sevil Nazarova (AIN)	13

==== Women's freestyle 57 kg ====
Round of 16
Sandra Paruszewski (GER)	6^{F}
Emine Çakmak (TUR)	0
Elvira Kamaloğlu (TUR)	10
Ulmeken Esenbaeva (UZB)	0
Erika Bognár (HUN)	12
Özge Fındıkçı (TUR)	0
Laura Almaganbetova (KAZ)	6
Laylokhon Sobirova (UZB)	7
Emma Tissina (KAZ)	2
Elena Brugger (GER)	2
Shugyla Omirbek (KAZ)	1
Narumi Nakamura (JPN)	8

Quarterfinals
Olga Khoroshavtseva (AIN)	11^{F}
Sandra Paruszewski (GER)	4
Elvira Kamaloğlu (TUR)	6
Erika Bognár (HUN)	0
Laylokhon Sobirova (UZB)	1
Emma Tissina (KAZ)	3^{F}
Narumi Nakamura (JPN)	2
Bediha Gün (TUR)	1

Semifinals
Olga Khoroshavtseva (AIN)	12
Elvira Kamaloğlu (TUR)	1
Emma Tissina (KAZ)	2
Narumi Nakamura (JPN)	4

Final
Olga Khoroshavtseva (AIN)	10
Narumi Nakamura (JPN)	4

Repechage round
Shugyla Omirbek (KAZ)	6^{F}
Bediha Gün (TUR)	11

Bronze medal match
Sandra Paruszewski (GER)	9
Elvira Kamaloğlu (TUR)	3
Shugyla Omirbek (KAZ)	0
Emma Tissina (KAZ)	10

==== Women's freestyle 59 kg ====
Round of 16
Anastasiia Sidelnikova (AIN)	8
Eda Tekin (TUR)	4
Khürelkhüügiin Bolortuyaa (MGL)	5^{F}
Diana Kayumova (KAZ)	0

Quarterfinals
Nazar Kaya (TUR)	0
Anastasiia Sidelnikova (AIN)	6
Kalmira Bilimbekova (KGZ)	1
Miyu Nakanishi (JPN)	3
~~Boldsaikhan Khongorzul (MGL)~~
Guldana Bekesh (KAZ)	WO
Khürelkhüügiin Bolortuyaa (MGL)	11^{F}
Merve Karadeniz (TUR)	0

Semifinals
Anastasiia Sidelnikova (AIN)	3
Miyu Nakanishi (JPN)	6
Guldana Bekesh (KAZ)	0
Khürelkhüügiin Bolortuyaa (MGL)	7^{F}

Final
Miyu Nakanishi (JPN)	1
Khürelkhüügiin Bolortuyaa (MGL)	1

Repechage round
Diana Kayumova (KAZ)	6
Merve Karadeniz (TUR)	2

Bronze medal match
Kalmira Bilimbekova (KGZ)	6
Anastasiia Sidelnikova (AIN)	0
Diana Kayumova (KAZ)	3
Guldana Bekesh (KAZ)	8

==== Women's freestyle 62 kg ====
Round of 16
Selvi İlyasoğlu (TUR)	5^{F}
Savannah Cosme (USA)	2
Dinara Kudaeva (AIN)	1
Kadriye Aksoy (TUR)	2
Marilyn Garcia (USA)	0
Aisuluu Tynybekova (KGZ)	8
Sükheegiin Tserenchimed (MGL)	8
Alina Kasabieva (AIN)	10
Ebru Dağbaşı (TUR)	3
Tynys Dubek (KAZ)	9
Luisa Scheel (GER)	4
Gulmira Aitmuratova (UZB)	4^{F}

Quarterfinals
Amina Tandelova (AIN)	6^{F}
Selvi İlyasoğlu (TUR)	0
Kadriye Aksoy (TUR)	0
Aisuluu Tynybekova (KGZ)	4^{F}
Alina Kasabieva (AIN)	15
Tynys Dubek (KAZ)	6
Gulmira Aitmuratova (UZB)	1
Irina Kuznetsova (KAZ)	12

Semifinals
Amina Tandelova (AIN)	6
Aisuluu Tynybekova (KGZ)	7^{F}
Alina Kasabieva (AIN)	9
Irina Kuznetsova (KAZ)	10

Final
Aisuluu Tynybekova (KGZ)	5
Irina Kuznetsova (KAZ)	0

Repechage round
Marilyn Garcia (USA)	WO
Kadriye Aksoy (TUR)

Bronze medal match
Marilyn Garcia (USA)	0
Amina Tandelova (AIN)	4^{F}
Gulmira Aitmuratova (UZB)	5
Alina Kasabieva (AIN)	7

==== Women's freestyle 65 kg ====
Pos	Athlete	Pld	W	L	CP	TP	MGL	KAZ	TUR	TUR
1	Tüvshinjargalyn Enkhjin (MGL)	3	3	0	13	17	—	9–0	4–0 Fall	4–0 Fall
2	Irina Kazyulina (KAZ)	3	2	1	10	11	0–3 PO	—	5–0 Fall	6–0 Fall
3	Ayşegül Sever (TUR)	3	1	2	5	4	0–5 FA	0–5 FA	—	4–4 Fall
4	Nazmiye Budak (TUR)	3	0	3	0	0	0–5 FA	0–5 FA	0–5 FA	—

Source: UWW

Pos	Athlete	Pld	W	L	CP	TP	JPN	AIN	KAZ
1	Mahiro Yoshitake (JPN)	2	2	0	8	10	—	7–0	3–0 Fall
2	Zlatoslava Stepanova (AIN)	2	1	1	4	10	0–3 PO	—	10–0
3	Guldana Osserbay (KAZ)	2	0	2	0	0	0–5 FA	0–4 SU	—

Source: UWW

Semifinals
Tüvshinjargalyn Enkhjin (MGL)	3
Zlatoslava Stepanova (AIN)	0
Mahiro Yoshitake (JPN)	10
Irina Kazyulina (KAZ)	0

Final
Tüvshinjargalyn Enkhjin (MGL)	1
Mahiro Yoshitake (JPN)	11
Bronze medal
Zlatoslava Stepanova (AIN)	6
Irina Kazyulina (KAZ)	3

==== Women's freestyle 68 kg ====
Final
Enkhsaikhany Delgermaa (MGL)	3
Noémi Szabados (HUN)	1

Round of 32
Enkhsaikhany Delgermaa (MGL)	5
Pürveegiin Nomin-Erdene (MGL)	0

Round of 16
Albina Kairgeldinova (KAZ)	4
Madina Bakbergenova (KAZ)	7
Enkhsaikhany Delgermaa (MGL)	4^{F}
Elif Kurt (TUR)	0
Eyleen Sewina (GER)	0
Khanum Velieva (AIN)	10
Sophia Schäfle (GER)	4
Erdenebatyn Odzayaa (MGL)	6

Quarterfinals
Madina Bakbergenova (KAZ)	0
Enkhsaikhany Delgermaa (MGL)	4
Khanum Velieva (AIN)	12
Erdenebatyn Odzayaa (MGL)	0

Semifinals
Enkhsaikhany Delgermaa (MGL)	6
Khanum Velieva (AIN)	2

Round of 32
Nurzat Nurtaeva (KGZ)	4
Kseniia Burakova (AIN)	4
Yelena Shalygina (KAZ)	0
Noémi Szabados (HUN)	11

Round of 16
Elizaveta Petliakova (AIN)	8^{F}
Kokona Takada (JPN)	0
Kseniia Burakova (AIN)	8
Gerda Barth (GER)	3
Nabira Esenbaeva (UZB)	0
Noémi Szabados (HUN)	8
Ariukhan Jumabaeva (UZB)	WO
Nesrin Baş (TUR)

Quarterfinals
Elizaveta Petliakova (AIN)	3
Kseniia Burakova (AIN)	8^{F}
Noémi Szabados (HUN)	11
Ariukhan Jumabaeva (UZB)	0

Semifinals
Kseniia Burakova (AIN)	2
Noémi Szabados (HUN)	6

Repechage round 1
Pürveegiin Nomin-Erdene (MGL)	2
Elif Kurt (TUR)	7
Yelena Shalygina (KAZ)	6^{F}
Nabira Esenbaeva (UZB)	10

Repechage round 2
Elif Kurt (TUR)	2
Madina Bakbergenova (KAZ)	9
Yelena Shalygina (KAZ)	6^{F}
Ariukhan Jumabaeva (UZB)	0

Bronze medals
Madina Bakbergenova (KAZ)	1
Khanum Velieva (AIN)	6
Yelena Shalygina (KAZ)	9
Kseniia Burakova (AIN)	4

==== Women's freestyle 72 kg ====
Round of 16
Sumire Niikura (JPN)	5
Lilly Schneider (GER)	2
Edanur Kanca (TUR)	6
Shamshiyabanu Tastanbek (KAZ)	8^{F}
Anastassiya Panassovich (KAZ)	4
Olesia Bezuglova (AIN)	1

Quarterfinals
Cemile Kılıçarslan (TUR)	0
Sumire Niikura (JPN)	11
Bükrenaz Sert (TUR)	12
Zorigtyn Bolortungalag (MGL)	6
Jennifer Rösler (GER)	5
Shamshiyabanu Tastanbek (KAZ)	1
Anastassiya Panassovich (KAZ)	5
Haticenur Sarı (TUR)	7

Semifinals
Sumire Niikura (JPN)	9^{F}
Bükrenaz Sert (TUR)	0
Jennifer Rösler (GER)	12
Haticenur Sarı (TUR)	1

Final
Sumire Niikura (JPN)	3
Jennifer Rösler (GER)	1

Repechage round
Lilly Schneider (GER)	11
Cemile Kılıçarslan (TUR)	0

Bronze medal match
Lilly Schneider (GER)	3^{F}
Bükrenaz Sert (TUR)	2
Shamshiyabanu Tastanbek (KAZ)	4^{F}
Haticenur Sarı (TUR)	8

==== Women's freestyle 76 kg ====
Round of 16
Enkh-Amaryn Davaanasan (MGL)	8
Mehtap Gültekin (TUR)	0
Francy Rädelt (GER)	4
Rita Talismanova (AIN)	10
Aiperi Medet Kyzy (KGZ)	6^{F}
Nodoka Yamamoto (JPN)	0
Elmira Syzdykova (KAZ)	10^{F}
Nazar Batır (TUR)	2
Bernadett Nagy (HUN)	1
Naigalsürengiin Zagardulam (MGL)	4^{F}

Quarterfinals
Alina Yertostik (KAZ)	0
Enkh-Amaryn Davaanasan (MGL)	3
Rita Talismanova (AIN)	4
Aiperi Medet Kyzy (KGZ)	8
Laura Kühn (GER)	0
Elmira Syzdykova (KAZ)	11
Naigalsürengiin Zagardulam (MGL)	11
Elmira Yasin (TUR)	0

Semifinals
Enkh-Amaryn Davaanasan (MGL)	1
Aiperi Medet Kyzy (KGZ)	3
Elmira Syzdykova (KAZ)	8^{F}
Naigalsürengiin Zagardulam (MGL)	3

Final
Aiperi Medet Kyzy (KGZ)	4
Elmira Syzdykova (KAZ)	1

Repechage round
Nodoka Yamamoto (JPN)	4
Rita Talismanova (AIN)	3
Nazar Batır (TUR)	4
Laura Kühn (GER)	1

Bronze medal match
Nodoka Yamamoto (JPN)	6
Enkh-Amaryn Davaanasan (MGL)	4
Nazar Batır (TUR)	0
Naigalsürengiin Zagardulam (MGL)	7^{F}
