= Othelie Høie =

Norwegian freestyle wrestler

Personal information
- Full name: Othelie Annette Høie
- Born: 9 December 2002 (age 23) Kristiansund, Norway
- Height: 1.55 m (5 ft 1 in)
- Weight: 59 kg (130 lb; 9.3 st)

Sport
- Country: Norway
- Sport: Women's freestyle wrestling
- Event: 59 kg
- Club: BK Atlas
Medal record
Women's freestyle wrestling
Representing Norway
World Championships
Bronze medal – third place	2023 Belgrade	59 kg
European Championships
Bronze medal – third place	2023 Zagreb	59 kg
Grand Prix
Gold medal – first place	2023 Klippan	59 kg
Gold medal – first place	2026 Tirana	59 kg
Bronze medal – third place	2024 Madrid	59 kg
Bronze medal – third place	2025 Madrid	59 kg
European U23 Championship
Bronze medal – third place	2021 Skopje	57 kg

Othelie Høie (born 9 December 2002) is a Norwegian freestyle wrestler competing in the 59 kg division and representing the club BK Atlas in Fredrikstad. She is the daughter of four-time world wrestling champion Gudrun Høie.

== Career ==
In 2023, Høie won a bronze medal in the women's freestyle 59 kg event at the 2023 European Wrestling Championships held in Zagreb, Croatia.

Høie competed at the 2024 European Wrestling Olympic Qualification Tournament in Baku, Azerbaijan hoping to qualify for the 2024 Summer Olympics in Paris, France. She was eliminated in her first match and she did not qualify for the Olympics.

== Achievements ==
Year	Tournament	Location	Result	Event
2023	European Championships	Zagreb, Croatia	3rd	Freestyle 59 kg
2023	World Championships	Belgrade, Serbia	3rd	Freestyle 59 kg
