= Aman Sehrawat =

Indian freestyle wrestler (born 2003)

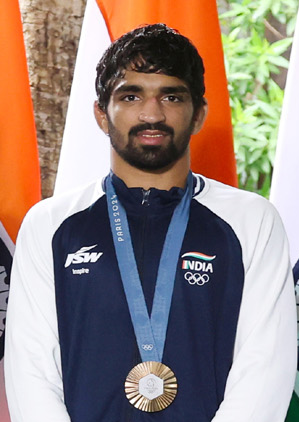
- Sehrawat in 2024

Personal information
- Born: 16 July 2003 (age 23) Birohar, Haryana, India
- Height: 1.70 m (5 ft 7 in)

Sport
- Sport: Wrestling
- Weight class: 57 kg
- Event: Freestyle
- Coached by: Emzarios Bentinidis

Achievements and titles
- Olympic finals: (bronze) 2024
- Regional finals: (gold) 2023 (gold) 2026 (silver) 2026 (bronze) 2022
- Highest world ranking: 2 (19 August 2024)
Medal record
Men's freestyle wrestling
Representing India
Olympic Games
Bronze medal – third place	2024 Paris	57 kg
Asian Games
Gold medal – first place	2026 Aichi–Nagoya	57 kg
Bronze medal – third place	2022 Hangzhou	57 kg
Asian Championships
Gold medal – first place	2023 Astana	57 kg
Silver medal – second place	2026 Bishkek	61 kg
Grand Prix
Gold medal – first place	2022 Almaty	57 kg
Gold medal – first place	2024 Zagreb	57 kg
Gold medal – first place	2025 Kocaeli	57 kg
Silver medal – second place	2022 Veliko Tarnovo	57 kg
Silver medal – second place	2022 Tunis	61 kg
Silver medal – second place	2024 Budapest	57 kg
Silver medal – second place	2026 Zagreb	61 kg
Bronze medal – third place	2022 Istanbul	57 kg
Bronze medal – third place	2023 Zagreb	57 kg
Bronze medal – third place	2025 Ulaanbaatar	57 kg
U23 World Championships
Gold medal – first place	2022 Pontevedra	57 kg
U23 Asian Championships
Gold medal – first place	2022 Bishkek	57 kg
U20 Asian Championships
Bronze medal – third place	2022 Manama	57 kg
U17 World Championships
Bronze medal – third place	2018 Zagreb	51 kg
Bronze medal – third place	2019 Sofia	55 kg
U17 Asian Championships
Gold medal – first place	2019 Astana	55 kg

Aman Sehrawat (born 16 July 2003) is an Indian freestyle wrestler who competes in the 57 kg division. He is the youngest Indian to win an individual Olympic medal, having secured a bronze medal at the 2024 Paris Olympics. He has also won gold medals at the 2026 Asian Games and the 2023 Asian Championships.

== Early life ==
Sehrawat was born on 16 July 2003 in Birohar village in Haryana, where he initially took part in mud wrestling. Inspired by Sushil Kumar's silver medal win in the 2012 Summer Olympics, he enrolled at the Chhatrasal Stadium, Delhi at the age of 10. He lost both of his parents at the age of 11. Following their deaths, Sehrawat and his younger sister Pooja, were taken in by their uncles. He struggled with depression and anxiety after his mother's death. At the Chhatrasal Stadium, he was trained by Lalit Kumar.

== Career ==
In 2022, following his gold medal at the U23 Asian Championships, Sehrawat became the first-ever Indian to win a gold medal at the U23 World Championships.

Sehrawat won his first National Championship title in 2021. He used to train under coach Lalit Kumar.

In April 2023, he won the gold medal at the 2023 Asian Wrestling Championships in Astana. He then won a bronze medal in the 57 kg category at the 2022 Asian Games.

In January 2024, he won the gold medal in the men's 57kg event at the Zagreb Open wrestling tournament, defeating all his opponents by technical superiority.

Sehrawat competed at the 2024 World Wrestling Olympic Qualification Tournament in Istanbul and earned India a quota place for the 2024 Summer Olympics in Paris. The WFI picked him over Tokyo Olympics silver medallist Ravi Kumar Dahiya for the 2024 Olympics. He was the only Indian male wrestler to qualify for the 2024 Summer Olympics.

In the men's 57 kg event at the 2024 Olympics, he defeated Vladimir Egorov and Zelimkhan Abakarov via technical superiority, before losing to the top-seed Rei Higuchi in the semifinal. He won the bronze medal by defeating Darian Cruz 13–5, becoming the youngest Indian to win an individual Olympic medal at 21 years and 24 days.

In 2026 Asian Games, he won a gold medal in men's 57kg category by defeating reigning champion Han Chong Song from North Korea.

== Performance record ==
(bronze) Bronze Medal at 57 kg
Res.	Record	Opponent	Score	Date	Event	Location
Win	32–7	Darian Cruz (PUR)	13-5	8-9 Aug 2024	2024 Summer Olympics	(France) Paris
Loss	31–7	Rei Higuchi (JPN)	0-10	8-9 Aug 2024	2024 Summer Olympics	(France) Paris
Win	31–6	Zelimkhan Abakarov (ALB)	12-0	8-9 Aug 2024	2024 Summer Olympics	(France) Paris
Win	30–6	Vladimir Egorov (MKD)	10-0	8-9 Aug 2024	2024 Summer Olympics	(France) Paris
Qualified at 57 kg
Win	29-6	Han Chang-song (PRK)	12-2	11-12 May 2024	2024 World Wrestling Olympic Qualification Tournament	(Turkey) Istanbul
Win	28-6	Andriy Yatsenko (UKR)	12-2	11-12 May 2024	2024 World Wrestling Olympic Qualification Tournament	(Turkey) Istanbul
Win	27-6	Georgi Vangelov (BUL)	10-4	11-12 May 2024	2024 World Wrestling Olympic Qualification Tournament	(Turkey) Istanbul
(gold) Gold Medal at 57 kg
Win	26-6	Zou Wanhao (CHN)	10-0	10 January 2024	2024 Grand Prix Zagreb Open	(Croatia) Zagreb
Win	25-6	Roberti Dingashvili (GEO)	11-0	10 January 2024	2024 Grand Prix Zagreb Open	(Croatia) Zagreb
Win	24-6	Zane Richards (USA)	11-0	10 January 2024	2024 Grand Prix Zagreb Open	(Croatia) Zagreb
Win	23-6	Muhammet Karavuş (TUR)	15-4	10 January 2024	2024 Grand Prix Zagreb Open	(Croatia) Zagreb
(bronze) Bronze Medal at 57 kg
Win	22-6	Liu Minghu (CHN)	11-0	6 October 2023	2022 Asian Games	(China) Hangzhou
Loss	21-6	Toshihiro Hasegawa (JPN)	10-12	6 October 2023	2022 Asian Games	(China) Hangzhou
Win	21-5	Ebrahim Khari (IRI)	19-8	6 October 2023	2022 Asian Games	(China) Hangzhou
Win	20-5	Kim Sunggwon (KOR)	6-1	6 October 2023	2022 Asian Games	(China) Hangzhou
11th at 57 kg
Loss	19-5	Zelimkhan Abakarov (ALB)	0-11	9 - 14 April 2023	2023 World Wrestling Championships	(Serbia) Belgrade
Win	19-4	Igor Chichioi (MDA)	11-0	9 - 14 April 2023	2023 World Wrestling Championships	(Serbia) Belgrade
11th at 61 kg
Loss	18-4	Pankaj Malik (IND)	1-8	4 June 2023	2023 Kaba Uulu Kozhomkul & Raatbek Sanatbaev Tournament	Bishkek, Kyrgyzstan
(gold) Gold Medal at 57 kg
Win	18-3	Almaz Smanbekov (KGZ)	9-4	13 April 2023	2023 Asian Wrestling Championships	Astana, Kazakhstan
Win	17-3	Zou Wanhao (CHN)	7-4	13 April 2023	2023 Asian Wrestling Championships	Astana, Kazakhstan
Win	16-3	Rikuto Arai (JPN)	7-1	13 April 2023	2023 Asian Wrestling Championships	Astana, Kazakhstan
(bronze) Bronze Medal at 57 kg
Win	15-3	Zane Richards (USA)	10-4	1 February 2023	2023 Grand Prix Zagreb Open	(Croatia) Zagreb
Loss	14-3	Yuto Nishiuchi (JPN)	5-15	1 February 2023	2023 Grand Prix Zagreb Open	(Croatia) Zagreb
Win	14-2	Roberti Dingashvili (GEO)	11-8	1 February 2023	2023 Grand Prix Zagreb Open	(Croatia) Zagreb
Win	13-2	Liu Minghu (CHN)	8-2	1 February 2023	2023 Grand Prix Zagreb Open	(Croatia) Zagreb
(silver) Silver Medal at 61 kg
Win	12-2	Süleyman Atlı (TUR)	12-2	17 July 2022	2022 Zouhaier Sghaier Ranking Series	(Tunisia) Tunis
Win	11-2	Nebi Uzun (TUR)	11-4	17 July 2022	2022 Zouhaier Sghaier Ranking Series	(Tunisia) Tunis
Loss	10-2	Seth Gross (USA)	2-11	17 July 2022	2022 Zouhaier Sghaier Ranking Series	(Tunisia) Tunis
Win	9-1	Assylzhan Yesengeldi (KAZ)	5-0	17 July 2022	2022 Zouhaier Sghaier Ranking Series	(Tunisia) Tunis
(gold) Gold Medal at 57 kg
Win	8-1	Merey Bazarbayev (KAZ)	10-9	5 June 2022	2022 Bolat Turlykhanov Cup	Almaty, Kazakhstan
Win	7-1	Zhakhongir Akhmajanov (KAZ)	5-0	5 June 2022	2022 Bolat Turlykhanov Cup	Almaty, Kazakhstan
Win	6-1	Abdumalik Karachov (KGZ)	10-0	5 June 2022	2022 Bolat Turlykhanov Cup	Almaty, Kazakhstan
Win	5-1	Meirambek Kartbay (KAZ)	15-12	5 June 2022	2022 Bolat Turlykhanov Cup	Almaty, Kazakhstan
(bronze) Bronze Medal at 57 kg
Win	4-1	Guesseppe Villarroel (ECU)	10-2, Fall	27 February 2022	2022 Yasar Dogu Tournament	(Turkey) Istanbul
Loss	3-1	Beka Bujiashvili (GEO)	10-16	27 February 2022	2022 Yasar Dogu Tournament	(Turkey) Istanbul
Win	2-0	Zandanbudyn Zanabazar (MGL)	10-5	27 February 2022	2022 Yasar Dogu Tournament	(Turkey) Istanbul
Win	1-0	Daulet Temirzhanov (KAZ)	15-4	27 February 2022	2022 Yasar Dogu Tournament	(Turkey) Istanbul

== Awards and nominations ==
Year	Award	Category	Result	Ref.
2024	Indian Sports Honours	Sportsman of the Year	Nominated	
2025	Arjuna Award	Outstanding Performance in Sports	Won	
2025	Times of India Sports Awards	Wrestler of the Year Male	Won	
2025	Times of India Sports Awards	Emerging Sportsperson of the Year	Won	
