= 2023 World Wrestling Championships – Men's freestyle 57 kg =

Wrestling competitions

Men's freestyle 57 kg at the 2023 World Championships
- Venue: Štark Arena
- Dates: 17–18 September 2023
- Competitors: 33 from 30 nations

Medalists
gold medal	Stevan Mićić	Serbia
silver medal	Rei Higuchi	Japan
bronze medal	Arsen Harutyunyan	Armenia
bronze medal	Zelimkhan Abakarov	Albania

The men's freestyle 57 kilograms is a competition featured at the 2023 World Wrestling Championships, and was held in Belgrade, Serbia on 17 and 18 September 2023.

This freestyle wrestling competition consists of a single-elimination tournament, with a repechage used to determine the winner of two bronze medals. The two finalists face off for gold and silver medals. Each wrestler who loses to one of the two finalists moves into the repechage, culminating in a pair of bronze medal matches featuring the semifinal losers each facing the remaining repechage opponent from their half of the bracket.

== Results ==
Legend

- F — Won by fall

=== Finals ===
Semifinals		Final
Rei Higuchi (JPN)	11
Meirambek Kartbay (KAZ)	0	Rei Higuchi (JPN)	4
Stevan Mićić (SRB)	6	Stevan Mićić (SRB)	7
Zelimkhan Abakarov (ALB)	2

=== Top half ===
==== Section 1 ====
Round of 64
Arsen Harutyunyan (ARM)	14
Kamil Kerymov (UKR)	3

Round of 32
Zou Wanhao (CHN)	4
Muhammad Bilal (PAK)	0
Rei Higuchi (JPN)	10
Georgi Vangelov (BUL)	0
Arsen Harutyunyan (ARM)	14
Simone Piroddu (ITA)	2
Vladimir Egorov (MKD)	4
Roberti Dingashvili (GEO)	2

Round of 16
Zou Wanhao (CHN)	1
Rei Higuchi (JPN)	4
Arsen Harutyunyan (ARM)	11
Vladimir Egorov (MKD)	0

Quarterfinals
Rei Higuchi (JPN)	16
Arsen Harutyunyan (ARM)	14

==== Section 2 ====
Round of 64

Round of 32
Almaz Smanbekov (KGZ)	7
Diamantino Iuna Fafé (GBS)	2
Niklas Stechele (GER)	6
Süleyman Atlı (TUR)	5
Ben Hachem Tarik (MAR)	0
Gamal Mohamed (EGY)	10
Meirambek Kartbay (KAZ)	5
Darian Cruz (PUR)	5

Round of 16
Almaz Smanbekov (KGZ)	1
Niklas Stechele (GER)	5
Gamal Mohamed (EGY)	0
Meirambek Kartbay (KAZ)	10

Quarterfinals
Niklas Stechele (GER)	1
Meirambek Kartbay (KAZ)	4

=== Bottom half ===
==== Section 3 ====
Round of 64

Round of 32
Zandanbudyn Zanabazar (MGL)	6
Dzmitry Shamela (AIN)	0
Zaur Uguev (AIN)	10
Levan Metreveli (ESP)	0
Gayan Ekanayake (SRI)	0
Gulomjon Abdullaev (UZB)	10
Kim Guk-hyeon (KOR)	0
Stevan Mićić (SRB)	11

Round of 16
Zandanbudyn Zanabazar (MGL)	0
Zaur Uguev (AIN)	6
Gulomjon Abdullaev (UZB)	2
Stevan Mićić (SRB)	7

Quarterfinals
Zaur Uguev (AIN)	7
Stevan Mićić (SRB)	9

==== Section 4 ====
Round of 64

Round of 32
Aliabbas Rzazade (AZE)	3
Zane Richards (USA)	2
Milad Valizadeh (IRI)	4
Răzvan Kovacs (ROU)	1
Aman Sehrawat (UWW)	11
Igor Chichioi (MDA)	0
Treye Trotman (CAN)	2
Zelimkhan Abakarov (ALB)	13

Round of 16
Aliabbas Rzazade (AZE)	4
Milad Valizadeh (IRI)	8
Aman Sehrawat (UWW)	0
Zelimkhan Abakarov (ALB)	11

Quarterfinals
Milad Valizadeh (IRI)	2
Zelimkhan Abakarov (ALB)	12

=== Repechage ===
Repechage round 2
Georgi Vangelov (BUL)	1
Zou Wanhao (CHN)	7
Kim Guk-hyeon (KOR)	0
Gulomjon Abdullaev (UZB)	10^{F}

Repechage round 3
Zou Wanhao (CHN)	0
Arsen Harutyunyan (ARM)	10
Gulomjon Abdullaev (UZB)	0
Zaur Uguev (AIN)	10

Bronze medals
Arsen Harutyunyan (ARM)	11
Meirambek Kartbay (KAZ)	0
Zaur Uguev (AIN)	4
Zelimkhan Abakarov (ALB)	4

Olympic wrestle-off
Meirambek Kartbay (KAZ)	0
Zaur Uguev (AIN)	4

== Final standing ==
Rank	Athlete
1st place, gold medalist(s)	Stevan Mićić (SRB)
2nd place, silver medalist(s)	Rei Higuchi (JPN)
3rd place, bronze medalist(s)	Arsen Harutyunyan (ARM)
3rd place, bronze medalist(s)	Zelimkhan Abakarov (ALB)
5	Zaur Uguev (AIN)
5	Meirambek Kartbay (KAZ)
7	Gulomjon Abdullaev (UZB)
8	Milad Valizadeh (IRI)
9	Niklas Stechele (GER)
10	Zou Wanhao (CHN)
11	Aman Sehrawat (UWW)
12	Gamal Mohamed (EGY)
13	Almaz Smanbekov (KGZ)
14	Aliabbas Rzazade (AZE)
15	Zandanbudyn Zanabazar (MGL)
16	Vladimir Egorov (MKD)
17	Darian Cruz (PUR)
18	Süleyman Atlı (TUR)
19	Kamil Kerymov (UKR)
20	Zane Richards (USA)
21	Roberti Dingashvili (GEO)
22	Diamantino Iuna Fafé (GBS)
23	Treye Trotman (CAN)
24	Simone Piroddu (ITA)
25	Răzvan Kovacs (ROU)
26	Georgi Vangelov (BUL)
27	Muhammad Bilal (PAK)
28	Dzmitry Shamela (AIN)
29	Ben Hachem Tarik (MAR)
30	Levan Metreveli (ESP)
31	Gayan Ekanayake (SRI)
32	Igor Chichioi (MDA)
33	Kim Guk-hyeon (KOR)

Qualified for the 2024 Summer Olympics
