= Rüdəkənar =

Rüdəkənar or Rudəkənar may refer to:

- Rüdəkənar, Astara, Azerbaijan
- Rüdəkənar, Masally, Azerbaijan
