= Zane Richards =

American wrestler (born 1994)

Personal information
- Full name: Zane Raye Rhodes Richards
- Born: February 4, 1994 (age 32) Carbondale, Illinois, U.S.
- Weight: 57 kg (126 lb)

Sport
- Country: United States
- Sport: Wrestling
- Events: Freestyle, Folkstyle and Greco Roman
- Club: Illinois RTC
Medal record
Men's freestyle wrestling
Representing United States
Pan American Games
Gold medal – first place	2023 Santiago	57 kg
Grand Prix
Gold medal – first place	2022 New York City	57 kg
Gold medal – first place	2023 New York City	57 kg
Bronze medal – third place	2018 New York City	57 kg
Bronze medal – third place	2023 Budapest	57 kg
US National Championships
Gold medal – first place	2023 Las Vegas	57 kg
Bronze medal – third place	2019 Las Vegas	57 kg
Collegiate Wrestling
Representing the Illinois Fighting Illini
Big Ten Championships
Silver medal – second place	2016 Iowa City	133 lb

Zane Raye Rhodes Richards (born February 4, 1994) is an American freestyle wrestler who competes at 57 kilograms. He was a gold medalist at the 2023 Pan American Games, as well as being the 2023 US National champion. Richards represented the United States at 57 kg at the 2023 World Wrestling Championships.

In 2024, he competed at the Pan American Wrestling Olympic Qualification Tournament held in Acapulco, Mexico hoping to qualify for the 2024 Summer Olympics in Paris, France. He was eliminated in his second match.

== Greco record ==
Senior Greco Matches
Res.	Record	Opponent	Score	Date	Event	Location
2025 CLAW US Open (silver) 60 kg
Loss	3-2	(United States) Max Black	1-2	April 23, 2025	2025 CLAW US Open (Greco)	(United States) Las Vegas, Nevada
Loss	3-1	(United States) Max Black	2-3	April 23, 2025	2025 CLAW US Open (Greco)	(United States) Las Vegas, Nevada
Win	3-0	(United States) Isaiah Cortez	6-2	April 23, 2025	2025 CLAW US Open (Greco)	(United States) Las Vegas, Nevada
Win	2-0	(United States) Phillip Moomey	TF 8-0	April 23, 2025	2025 CLAW US Open (Greco)	(United States) Las Vegas, Nevada
Win	1-0	(United States) Elijah Cortez	7-3	April 23, 2025	2025 CLAW US Open (Greco)	(United States) Las Vegas, Nevada

== Freestyle record ==
Senior Freestyle Matches
Res.	Record	Opponent	Score	Date	Event	Location
2024 US Olympic Team Trials DNP at 57 kg
Loss		(United States) Jax Forrest	FF	April 19, 2024	2024 US Olympic Team Trials	(United States) State College, Pennsylvania
Loss	60-31	(United States) Spencer Lee	6-13	April 19, 2024	2024 US Olympic Team Trials	(United States) State College, Pennsylvania
Win	60-30	(United States) Luke Lilledahl	5-3	April 19, 2024	2024 US Olympic Team Trials	(United States) State College, Pennsylvania
2024 Pan American Olympic Qualification 4th at 57 kg
Loss	59-30	(Puerto Rico) Darian Cruz	2-2	February 28, 2024	2024 Pan American Olympic Qualification	Acapulco, Mexico
Win	59-29	(Costa Rica) Peter Hammer	TF 14-1	February 28, 2024	2024 Pan American Olympic Qualification	Acapulco, Mexico
2024 Zagreb Open DNP at 57 kg
Loss	58-29	(Turkey) Muhammet Karavus	8-17	January 10, 2024	2024 Zagreb Open	Zagreb, Croatia
Loss	58-28	(India) Aman Sehrawat	TF 0-11	January 10, 2024	2024 Zagreb Open	Zagreb, Croatia
Win	58-27	(Turkey) Ahmet Duman	5-2	January 10, 2024	2024 Zagreb Open	Zagreb, Croatia
2023 Pan American Games (gold) at 57 kg
Win	57-27	(Colombia) Óscar Tigreros	TF 10-0	November 1, 2023	2023 Pan American Games	Santiago, Chile
Win	56-27	(Puerto Rico) Darian Cruz	8-2	November 1, 2023	2023 Pan American Games	Santiago, Chile
Win		(Dominican Republic) Juan Ramirez	FF	November 1, 2023	2023 Pan American Games	Santiago, Chile
2023 World Championships 20th at 57 kg
Loss	55-27	(Azerbaijan) Aliabbas Rzazade	2-3	September 16, 2023	2023 World Championships	Belgrade, Serbia
2023 Polyàk Imre Memorial (bronze) at 57 kg
Win	55-26	(Germany) Niklas Stechele	5-2	July 13, 2023	2023 Polyàk Imre Memorial	Budapest, Hungary
Loss	54-26	(Kyrgyzstan) Almaz Smanbekov	2-2	July 13, 2023	2023 Polyàk Imre Memorial	Budapest, Hungary
Win	54-25	(Iran) Milad Valizadeh	TF 17-6	July 13, 2023	2023 Polyàk Imre Memorial	Budapest, Hungary
Win	53-25	(Georgia (country)) Beka Bujiashvili	TF 10-0	July 13, 2023	2023 Polyàk Imre Memorial	Budapest, Hungary
2023 Final X Newark (gold) 57 kg
Win	52-25	(United States) Thomas Gilman	8-6	June 10, 2023	2023 Final X Newark	(United States) Newark, New Jersey
Win	51-25	(United States) Thomas Gilman	4-3	June 10, 2023	2023 Final X Newark	(United States) Newark, New Jersey
2023 US Open (gold) at 57 kg
Win	50-25	(United States) Nick Suriano	3-3	April 26, 2023	2023 US Open	(United States) Las Vegas, Nevada
Win	49-25	(United States) Jakob Camacho	8-4	April 26, 2023	2023 US Open	(United States) Las Vegas, Nevada
Win	48-25	(United States) Michael Tortorice	TF 10-0	April 26, 2023	2023 US Open	(United States) Las Vegas, Nevada
Win	47-25	(United States) Brandon Meredith	6-1	April 26, 2023	2023 US Open	(United States) Las Vegas, Nevada
Win	46-25	(United States) Yevier Lopez	TF 10-0	April 26, 2023	2023 US Open	(United States) Las Vegas, Nevada
2023 Zagreb Open 5th at 57 kg
Loss	45-25	(India) Aman Sherawat	4-10	February 5, 2023	2023 Zagreb Open	Zagreb, Croatia
Win	45-24	(Puerto Rico) Darian Cruz	TF 12-2	February 5, 2023	2023 Zagreb Open	Zagreb, Croatia
Loss	44-24	(Japan) Yuto Nishiuchi	4-6	February 5, 2023	2023 Zagreb Open	Zagreb, Croatia
Win	44-23	(Japan) Rikuto Arai	10-6	February 5, 2023	2023 Zagreb Open	Zagreb, Croatia
Win	43-23	(Iran) Reza Momenijoujadeh	6-2	December 11, 2022	2022 Wrestling World Cup – 57 kg	(United States) Los Angeles, California
Win	42-23	(Mongolia) Zandanbudyn Zanabazar	TF 10-0	December 11, 2022	2022 Wrestling World Cup – 57 kg	(United States) Los Angeles, California
2022 Bill Farrell Memorial (gold) 57 kg
Win	41-23	(Ecuador) Guesseppe Rea	TF 10-0	November 18, 2022	2022 Bill Farrell Memorial	(United States) New York City
Win	40-23	(United States) Dalton Henderson	TF 10-0	November 18, 2022	2022 Bill Farrell Memorial	(United States) New York City
Win	39-23	(United States) Joseph Manchio	TF 11-0	November 18, 2022	2022 Bill Farrell Memorial	(United States) New York City
2022 Final X Stillwater (bronze) 57 kg
Win	38-23	(United States) Jakob Camacho	TF 10-0	June 3, 2022	2022 Final X Stillwater	(United States) Stillwater, Oklahoma
2022 World Team Trials Challenge Tournament (bronze) 57 kg
Win	37-23	(United States) Matth Ramos	6-5	May 21, 2022	2022 World Team Trials Challenge	(United States) Coralville, Iowa
Win	36-23	(United States) Anthony Molton	TF 14-4	May 21, 2022	2022 World Team Trials Challenge	(United States) Coralville, Iowa
Loss	35-23	(United States) Vito Arujau	0-7	May 21, 2022	2022 World Team Trials Challenge	(United States) Coralville, Iowa
Win	35-22	(United States) Timothy Levine	TF 10-0	May 21, 2022	2022 World Team Trials Challenge	(United States) Coralville, Iowa
2022 Bill Farrell Memorial (gold) 57 kg
Win	34-22	(United States) Nico Provo	TF 10-0	April 1, 2022	2022 Bill Farrell Memorial	(United States) New York City
Win	33-22	(United States) Gregory Diakomihalis	TF 11-0	April 1, 2022	2022 Bill Farrell Memorial	(United States) New York City
Win	32-22	(United States) Michael Tortorice	TF 10-0	April 1, 2022	2022 Bill Farrell Memorial	(United States) New York City
2021 World Team Trials DNP 61 kg
Loss	31-22	(United States) Ethan Rotondo	7-11	September 11, 2021	2021 World Team Trials	(United States) Lincoln, Nebraska
Loss	31-21	(United States) Nahshon Garrett	TF 4-14	September 11, 2021	2021 World Team Trials	(United States) Lincoln, Nebraska
2020 US Olympic Team Trials 4th at 57 kg
Loss	31-20	(United States) Nathan Tomasello	6-12	April 2, 2021	2020 US Olympic Team Trials	(United States) Fort Worth, Texas
Win		(United States) Daton Fix	FF	April 2, 2021	2020 US Olympic Team Trials	(United States) Fort Worth, Texas
Win		(United States) Seth Gross	FF	April 2, 2021	2020 US Olympic Team Trials	(United States) Fort Worth, Texas
Loss	31-19	(United States) Thomas Gilman	TF 0-11	April 2, 2021	2020 US Olympic Team Trials	(United States) Fort Worth, Texas
Win	31-18	(United States) Zach Sanders	TF 10-0	April 2, 2021	2020 US Olympic Team Trials	(United States) Fort Worth, Texas
2021 Last Chance Olympic Qualifier (silver) 57 kg
Win	30-18	(United States) Jack Mueller	TF 10-0	March 26, 2021	2021 Last Chance Olympic Qualifier	(United States) Fort Worth, Texas
Loss	29-18	(United States) Sean Russell	4-12	March 26, 2021	2021 Last Chance Olympic Qualifier	(United States) Fort Worth, Texas
Win	29-17	(United States) Daniel DeShazer	2-1	March 26, 2021	2021 Last Chance Olympic Qualifier	(United States) Fort Worth, Texas
Win	28-17	(United States) Matt Ramos	8-4	March 26, 2021	2021 Last Chance Olympic Qualifier	(United States) Fort Worth, Texas
Win	27-17	(United States) Gabriel Gray	TF 10-0	March 26, 2021	2021 Last Chance Olympic Qualifier	(United States) Fort Worth, Texas
Loss	26-17	(United States) Seth Gross	3-11	January 9, 2021	Flowrestling 3: Adeline vs. Tamyra	(United States) Austin, Texas
Win	26-16	(United States) Zach Sanders	13-11	June 28, 2020	2020 Rumble on the Rooftop	(United States) Chicago, Illinois
2019 Senior Nationals-Olympic Trials Qualifier DNP 57 kg
Loss	25-16	(United States) Nick Suriano	TF -12	December 20, 2019	2019 Senior Nationals-Olympic Trials Qualifier	(United States) Fort Worth, Texas
Win	25-15	(United States) Edward Klimara	TF 16-5	December 20, 2019	2019 Senior Nationals-Olympic Trials Qualifier	(United States) Fort Worth, Texas
Win	24-15	(United States) Jacob Moran	TF 11-0	December 20, 2019	2019 Senior Nationals-Olympic Trials Qualifier	(United States) Fort Worth, Texas
Loss	23-15	(United States) Alan Waters	Fall	December 20, 2019	2019 Senior Nationals-Olympic Trials Qualifier	(United States) Fort Worth, Texas
Win	23-14	(United States) Austin Miller	TF 10-0	December 20, 2019	2019 Senior Nationals-Olympic Trials Qualifier	(United States) Fort Worth, Texas
2019 Bill Farrell International Open DNP at 57 kg
Loss	22-14	(United States) Nick Suriano	TF 0-10	November 15, 2019	2019 Bill Farrell International Open	(United States) New York City, New York
Loss	22-13	(United States) Nathan Tomasello	6-8	November 15, 2019	2019 Bill Farrell International Open	(United States) New York City, New York
Win	22-12	(United States) Nahshon Garrett	5-3	November 15, 2019	2019 Bill Farrell International Open	(United States) New York City, New York
Win	21-12	(United States) Frank Perrelli	TF 11-0	November 15, 2019	2019 Bill Farrell International Open	(United States) New York City, New York
2019 World Trials Challenge Tournament DNP at 57 kg
Loss	20-12	(United States) Joshua Rodriquez	4-6	May 18, 2019	2019 World Trials Challenge Tournament	(United States) Raleigh, North Carolina
Loss	20-11	(United States) Jack Mueller	5-7	May 18, 2019	2019 World Trials Challenge Tournament	(United States) Raleigh, North Carolina
2019 US Open (bronze) at 57 kg
Win	20-10	(United States) Vito Arujau	8-2	April 24–27, 2019	2019 US Open National Championships	(United States) Las Vegas, Nevada
Win	19-10	(United States) Darian Cruz	6-2	April 24–27, 2019	2019 US Open National Championships	(United States) Las Vegas, Nevada
Win	18-10	(United States) Frank Perrelli	TF 12-2	April 24–27, 2019	2019 US Open National Championships	(United States) Las Vegas, Nevada
Win	17-10	(United States) Jesse Delgado	TF 11-0	April 24–27, 2019	2019 US Open National Championships	(United States) Las Vegas, Nevada
Loss	16-10	(United States) Thomas Gilman	TF 0-11	April 24–27, 2019	2019 US Open National Championships	(United States) Las Vegas, Nevada
Win	16-9	(United States) Joshua Rodriquez	TF 10-0	April 24–27, 2019	2019 US Open National Championships	(United States) Las Vegas, Nevada
Win	15-9	(United States) Bernardino Gomez	8-7	April 24–27, 2019	2019 US Open National Championships	(United States) Las Vegas, Nevada
Loss	14-9	(Mongolia) Tuvshintulga Tumenbileg	0-6	March 16–17, 2019	2019 World Cup	Yakutsk, Russia
2019 Ivan Yarygin Grand Prix DNP at 57 kg
Loss	14-8	(Mongolia) Bekhbayar Erdenebat	7-8	January 24, 2019	Golden Grand Prix Ivan Yarygin 2019	Krasnoyarsk, Russia
2018 World Team Trials Challenge Tournament 4th at 57 kg
Loss	14-7	(United States) Tim Lambert	2-10	May 17, 2018	2018 World Team Trials Challenge Tournament	(United States) Rochester, Minnesota
Win	14-6	(United States) Brent Fleetwood	12-6	May 17, 2018	2018 World Team Trials Challenge Tournament	(United States) Rochester, Minnesota
Loss	13-6	(United States) Daton Fix	2-9	May 17, 2018	2018 World Team Trials Challenge Tournament	(United States) Rochester, Minnesota
Win	13-5	(United States) David Terao	TF 12-2	May 17, 2018	2018 World Team Trials Challenge Tournament	(United States) Rochester, Minnesota
2018 US Open DNP at 57 kg
Loss	12-5	(United States) Austin Assad	10-10	April 25, 2018	2018 US Open	(United States) Las Vegas, Nevada
Loss	12-4	(United States) Joshua Rodriquez	4-5	April 25, 2018	2018 US Open	(United States) Las Vegas, Nevada
2018 Bill Farrell International Open (bronze) at 57 kg
Win	12-3	(United States) Austin Miller	9-0	March 29, 2018	2018 Bill Farrell International Open	(United States) New York City, New York
Win	11-3	(South Korea) Guk Heon Kim	TF 13-2	March 29, 2018	2018 Bill Farrell International Open	(United States) New York City, New York
Loss	10-3	(United States) Samat Nadyrbek Uulu	3-5	March 29, 2018	2018 Bill Farrell International Open	(United States) New York City, New York
Win	10-2	(United States) Austin Miller	12-7	March 29, 2018	2018 Bill Farrell International Open	(United States) New York City, New York
2017 US Senior Last Chance WTT Qualifier (bronze) at 57 kg
Win	9-2	(United States) David Terao	TF 13-2	May 19, 2017	2017 US Senior Last Chance WTT Qualifier	(United States) Rochester, Minnesota
Win	8-2	(United States) Justin Portillo	TF 14-4	May 19, 2017	2017 US Senior Last Chance WTT Qualifier	(United States) Rochester, Minnesota
Loss	7-2	(United States) Daniel Deshazer	4-7	May 19, 2017	2017 US Senior Last Chance WTT Qualifier	(United States) Rochester, Minnesota
2016 University Freestyle Nationals (gold) at 61 kg
Win	7-1	(United States) Tyler Graff	4-2	June 2, 2016	2016 University Freestyle Nationals	(United States) Akron, Ohio
Win	6-1	(United States) Tyler Graff	11-11	June 2, 2016	2016 University Freestyle Nationals	(United States) Akron, Ohio
Loss	5-1	(United States) Tyler Graff	TF 0-10	June 2, 2016	2016 University Freestyle Nationals	(United States) Akron, Ohio
Win	5-0	(United States) Mark Grey	7-5	June 2, 2016	2016 University Freestyle Nationals	(United States) Akron, Ohio
Win	4-0	(United States) Shelton Mack	7-6	June 2, 2016	2016 University Freestyle Nationals	(United States) Akron, Ohio
Win	3-0	(United States) Jarod Maynes	TF 15-2	June 2, 2016	2016 University Freestyle Nationals	(United States) Akron, Ohio
Win	2-0	(United States) Cole Baumgartner	TF 10-0	June 2, 2016	2016 University Freestyle Nationals	(United States) Akron, Ohio
Win	1-0	(United States) James Giaccia	TF 10-0	June 2, 2016	2016 University Freestyle Nationals	(United States) Akron, Ohio
