= Golden Grand Prix Ivan Yarygin 2019 – Men's freestyle 57 kg =

2019 Men's freestyle 57kg competition

The men's freestyle 57 kg is a competition featured at the Golden Grand Prix Ivan Yarygin 2019, and was held in Krasnoyarsk, Russia on 24 January.

== Medalists ==
Gold	(Chechnya) Muslim Sadulaev
Silver	(Dagestan) Abasgadzhi Magomedov
Bronze	Thomas Gilman (USA)
Bronze	Narmandakhyn Nasanbuyan (MGL)

== Results ==
Legend

- F — Won by fall
- WO — Won by walkover (forfeit)

=== Final ===
Final
(Chechnya) Muslim Sadulaev	4
(Dagestan) Abasgadzhi Magomedov	4

=== Top half ===
Round of 8
Abzal Okenov (KAZ)	4
Erdenebatyn Bekhbayar (MGL)	10
Zane Richards (USA)	7
Tümenbilegiin Tüvshintulga (MGL)	8
(Dagestan) Abasgadzhi Magomedov	13
Ahmet Peker (TUR)	3
Thomas Gilman (USA)	10
Aleksei Blanco (CUB)	0

Round of 4
(Chechnya) Muslim Sadulaev	4
Wanhao Zou (CHN)	3
Narmandakhyn Nasanbuyan (MGL)	9
(Kabardino-Balkaria) Amirkhan Guvazhokov	6
Erdenebatyn Bekhbayar (MGL)	2
Tümenbilegiin Tüvshintulga (MGL)	1
(Dagestan) Abasgadzhi Magomedov	12^{F}
Thomas Gilman (USA)	6

Semifinals
(Chechnya) Muslim Sadulaev	11
Narmandakhyn Nasanbuyan (MGL)	0
Erdenebatyn Bekhbayar (MGL)	5
(Dagestan) Abasgadzhi Magomedov	5

Final

== Repechage ==
Repechage round 1
-
-
-
-

Repechage round 2
Ahmet Peker (TUR)	0
Thomas Gilman (USA)	9
-
-

Bronze medals
Thomas Gilman (USA)	14
Erdenebatyn Bekhbayar (MGL)	8
Wanhao Zou (CHN)	4
Narmandakhyn Nasanbuyan (MGL)	4
