= Abasgadzhi Magomedov =

Russian freestyle wrestler

Personal information
- Native name: Абасгаджи Мухтарович Магомедов
- Full name: Abasgadzhi Mukhtarovich Magomedov
- Born: 15 March 1998 (age 28) Tissi village, Tsumadinsky District, Dagestan, Russia
- Height: 170 cm (5 ft 7 in)

Sport
- Country: Russia
- Sport: Amateur wrestling
- Weight class: 61 kg
- Event: Freestyle
- Club: Gadzhi Makhachev WC

Achievements and titles
- World finals: (gold) (2021) (silver) (2023)
- Regional finals: (gold) (2021)(2024)
- National finals: (gold) (2020)(2021) (2022)(2023)
Medal record
Men's freestyle wrestling
Representing Russia and Individual Neutral Athletes
World Championships
Gold medal – first place	2021 Oslo	61 kg
Silver medal – second place	2023 Belgrade	61 kg
Bronze medal – third place	2026 Astana	65 kg
European Championships
Gold medal – first place	2021 Warsaw	61 kg
Gold medal – first place	2024 Bucharest	61 kg
Individual World Cup
Gold medal – first place	2020 Belgrade	61 kg
BRICS Games
Gold medal – first place	2024 Kazan	65 kg
European U23 Championships
Gold medal – first place	2019 Novi Sad	61 kg
World Juniors Championships
Gold medal – first place	2018 Trnava	61 kg
World Cadets Championships
Silver medal – second place	2015 Sarajevo	54 kg
Representing Dagestan
Golden Grand Prix Ivan Yarygin
Gold medal – first place	2021 Krasnoyarsk	61 kg
Gold medal – first place	2022 Krasnoyarsk	61 kg
Gold medal – first place	2024 Krasnoyarsk	61 kg
Silver medal – second place	2019 Krasnoyarsk	57 kg
Bronze medal – third place	2020 Krasnoyarsk	61 kg
Bronze medal – third place	2023 Krasnoyarsk	61 kg
Bronze medal – third place	2026 Krasnoyarsk	65 kg
Russian National Championships
Gold medal – first place	2020 Naro-Fominsk	61 kg
Gold medal – first place	2021 Ulan-Ude	61 kg
Gold medal – first place	2022 Kyzyl	61 kg
Gold medal – first place	2023 Kaspiysk	61 kg
Silver medal – second place	2024 Novoivanovskoye	65 kg
All-Russian Spartakiad
Silver medal – second place	2022 Kazan	61 kg

Abasgadzhi Magomedov (Russian: Абасгаджи Мухтарович Магомедов; born 15 March 1998) is a Russian freestyle wrestler who competes at 61 and 65 kilograms. He was the 2021 World Champion, defeating Daton Fix to claim the gold medal.

An accomplished athlete, Magomedov was also the 2020 Individual World Cup winner, 2021 European Continental champion, 2020 Russian national champion, 2021 Golden Grand Prix Ivan Yarygin champion (three-time medalist), 2019 U23 European champion, and a Junior World and European champion. In 2021, he won senior world championships, in final match he beat NCAA super star Daton Fix from USA. On September 17, 2023, Abasgadzhi Magomedov won a silver medal in the 61 kg weight category at the 2023 World Wrestling Championships in Belgrade In the final, in a very hard fought match, he lost 9:10 to American wrestler Vito Arujau

== Major results ==
Year	Competition	Venue	Position	Event	Notes
Representing Russia
2017	Intercontinental Cup	Khasavyurt, Russia	2nd	Freestyle 57 kg	
2018	Intercontinental Cup	Khasavyurt, Russia	1st	Freestyle 61 kg	
2019	Golden Grand Prix Ivan Yarygin	Krasnoyarsk, Russia	2nd	Freestyle 57 kg	
2019	U23 European Championships	Novi Sad, Serbia	1st	Freestyle 61 kg	
2020	Golden Grand Prix Ivan Yarygin	Krasnoyarsk, Russia	3rd	Freestyle 61 kg	
2020	Russian National Championships	Naro-Fominsk, Russia	1st	Freestyle 61 kg	
2020	Individual World Cup	Belgrade, Serbia	1st	Freestyle 61 kg	
2021	Russian National Championships	Ulan–Ude, Russia	1st	Freestyle 61 kg	
2021	European Championships	Warsaw, Poland	1st	Freestyle 61 kg	
2021	Golden Grand Prix Ivan Yarygin	Krasnoyarsk, Russia	1st	Freestyle 61 kg	
2021	World Championships	Oslo, Norway	1st	Freestyle 61 kg	

== Freestyle record ==
Senior Freestyle Matches
Res.	Record	Opponent	Score	Date	Event	Location
2022 Russian Nationals (gold) at 61 kg
Win	82–7	(Russia) Akhmed Idrisov	4–2	June 24–26, 2022	2022 Russian National Championships	Kyzyl, Russia
Win	81–7	(Russia) Bashir Magomedov	4–0	June 24–26, 2022	2022 Russian National Championships	Kyzyl, Russia
Win	80–7	(Russia) Muslim Mekhtikhanov		June 24–26, 2022	2022 Russian National Championships	Kyzyl, Russia
Win	79–7	(Russia) Kezhik Mongush	TF 15–4	June 24–26, 2022	2022 Russian National Championships	Kyzyl, Russia
Win	78–7	(Russia) Zhargal Damdinov	13–8	June 24–26, 2022	2022 Russian National Championships	Kyzyl, Russia
2022 Ivan Poddubny League (gold) at 61 kg
Win	77–7	(Russia) Bashir Magomedov	8–3	May 19–20, 2022	2022 Ivan Poddubny Wrestling League	Moscow, Russia
Win	76–7	(Russia) Magomed Baytukayev	TF 10–0	May 19–20, 2022	2022 Ivan Poddubny Wrestling League	Moscow, Russia
Win	75–7	(Russia) Ramazan Bagavudinov	TF 11–0	May 19–20, 2022	2022 Ivan Poddubny Wrestling League	Moscow, Russia
2022 Ivan Yarygin Golden Grand Prix (gold) at 61 kg
Win	74–7	(Russia) Fedor Baltuev	9–8	27–30 January 2022	Golden Grand Prix Ivan Yarygin 2022	Krasnoyarsk, Russia
Win	73–7	(Russia) Muslim Mekhtikhanov	6–3	27–30 January 2022	Golden Grand Prix Ivan Yarygin 2022	Krasnoyarsk, Russia
Win	72–7	(Albania) Zelimkhan Abakarov	6–0	27–30 January 2022	Golden Grand Prix Ivan Yarygin 2022	Krasnoyarsk, Russia
Win	71–7	(Russia) Semen Vladimirov	TF 12–1	27–30 January 2022	Golden Grand Prix Ivan Yarygin 2022	Krasnoyarsk, Russia
Win	70–7	(Kazakhstan) Azat Ogannissyan	TF 11–0	27–30 January 2022	Golden Grand Prix Ivan Yarygin 2022	Krasnoyarsk, Russia
2021 World Championships (gold) at 61 kg
Win	69–7	(United States) Daton Fix	4–1	3 October 2021	2021 World Championships	Oslo, Norway
Win	68–7	(Japan) Toshihiro Hasegawa	TF 10–0	2 October 2021	2021 World Championships	Oslo, Norway
Win	67–7	(Mongolia) Tümenbilegiin Tüvshintulga	Fall	2 October 2021	2021 World Championships	Oslo, Norway
Win	66–7	(Turkey) Emrah Ormanoğlu	Fall	2 October 2021	2021 World Championships	Oslo, Norway
2021 Ivan Yarygin Golden Grand Prix (gold) at 61 kg
Win	65–7	(Russia) Rustam Karakhanov	Fall	27–28 May 2021	Golden Grand Prix Ivan Yarygin 2021	Krasnoyarsk, Russia
Win	64–7	(Russia) Kezhik Mongush	TF 10–0	27–28 May 2021	Golden Grand Prix Ivan Yarygin 2021	Krasnoyarsk, Russia
Win	63–7	(Russia) Zhargal Damdinov	Fall	27–28 May 2021	Golden Grand Prix Ivan Yarygin 2021	Krasnoyarsk, Russia
Win	62–7	(Russia) Nodar Arabidze	TF 14–2	27–28 May 2021	Golden Grand Prix Ivan Yarygin 2021	Krasnoyarsk, Russia
Win	61–7	(Russia) Petr Pavlov	TF 11–0	27–28 May 2021	Golden Grand Prix Ivan Yarygin 2021	Krasnoyarsk, Russia
2021 European Championships (gold) at 61 kg
Win	60–7	(Ukraine) Andrii Dzhelep	TF 12–2	19–20 April 2021	2021 European Continental Championships	Warsaw, Poland
Win	59–7	(Poland) Eduard Grigorev	4–2	19–20 April 2021	2021 European Continental Championships	Warsaw, Poland
Win	58–7	(Turkey) Emrah Ormanoğlu	Fall	19–20 April 2021	2021 European Continental Championships	Warsaw, Poland
Win	57–7	(Bulgaria) Georgi Vangelov	Fall	19–20 April 2021	2021 European Continental Championships	Warsaw, Poland
2021 Russian Nationals (gold) at 61 kg
Win	56–7	(Dagestan) Muslim Mekhtikhanov	4–1	11–14 March 2021	2021 Russian National Freestyle Wrestling Championships	Ulan-Ude, Russia
Win	55–7	(Buryatia) Aldar Balzhinimayev	TF 10–0	11–14 March 2021	2021 Russian National Freestyle Wrestling Championships	Ulan-Ude, Russia
Win	54–7	(Russia) Aleksander Sabanov	8–4	11–14 March 2021	2021 Russian National Freestyle Wrestling Championships	Ulan-Ude, Russia
Win	53–7	(Russia) Rustam Karachanov	TF 12–2	11–14 March 2021	2021 Russian National Freestyle Wrestling Championships	Ulan-Ude, Russia
Win	52–7	(Russia) Islam Malchagov	TF 12–0	11–14 March 2021	2021 Russian National Freestyle Wrestling Championships	Ulan-Ude, Russia
2020 Individual World Cup (gold) at 61 kg
Win	51–7	(Azerbaijan) Akhmednabi Gvarzatilov	5–1	16–18 December 2020	2020 Individual World Cup	Belgrade, Serbia
Win	50–7	(Argentina) Agustín Destribats	7–0	16–18 December 2020	2020 Individual World Cup	Belgrade, Serbia
Win	49–7	(Armenia) Razmik Papikyan	TF 10–0	16–18 December 2020	2020 Individual World Cup	Belgrade, Serbia
Win	48–7	(Ukraine) Volodymyr Burukov	TF 12–2	16–18 December 2020	2020 Individual World Cup	Belgrade, Serbia
2020 Russian Nationals (gold) at 61 kg
Win	47–7	(Russia) Ramazan Ferzaliev	8–7	16–18 October 2020	2020 Russian National Freestyle Wrestling Championships	Naro-Fominsk, Russia
Win	46–7	(Russia) Ibragim Abdurakhmanov	4–2	16–18 October 2020	2020 Russian National Freestyle Wrestling Championships	Naro-Fominsk, Russia
Win	45–7	(Russia) Tamerlan Karaev	TF 10–0	16–18 October 2020	2020 Russian National Freestyle Wrestling Championships	Naro-Fominsk, Russia
Win	44–7	(Russia) Dmitri Aksenov	Fall	16–18 October 2020	2020 Russian National Freestyle Wrestling Championships	Naro-Fominsk, Russia
2020 Ivan Yarygin Golden Grand Prix (bronze) at 61 kg
Win	43–7	(Kazakhstan) Vladimir Kudrin	TF 10–0	23–26 January 2020	Golden Grand Prix Ivan Yarygin 2020	Krasnoyarsk, Russia
Loss	42–7	(Russia) Aleksandr Bogomoev	0–3	23–26 January 2020	Golden Grand Prix Ivan Yarygin 2020	Krasnoyarsk, Russia
Win	42–6	(Russia) Nurtilek Ermekbaev	TF 16–6	23–26 January 2020	Golden Grand Prix Ivan Yarygin 2020	Krasnoyarsk, Russia
Win	41–6	(Mongolia) Bold Tumentsogt	TF 10–0	23–26 January 2020	Golden Grand Prix Ivan Yarygin 2020	Krasnoyarsk, Russia
2019–20 Deutsche Ringerliga season (gold) for Team Weingarten at 63 kg
Win	40–6	(Cuba) Yowlys Bonne	12–2	6 January 2020	2019–2020 Deutsche Ringerliga	Germany
2019 Alans International (silver) at 61 kg
Loss	39–6	(Russia) Ramazan Ferzaliev	7–10	7–8 December 2019	2019 Alans International	Vladikavkaz, Russia
Win	39–5	(Russia) Zelimkhan Abakarov	8–7	7–8 December 2019	2019 Alans International	Vladikavkaz, Russia
Win	38–5	(Uzbekistan) Abbos Rakhmonov	15–6	7–8 December 2019	2019 Alans International	Vladikavkaz, Russia
Win	37–5	(Russia) Magomed Salavatov	TF 10–0	7–8 December 2019	2019 Alans International	Vladikavkaz, Russia
Win	36–5	(Russia) Dzimchyk Rynchnau	TF 18–2	23 November 2019	2019–2020 Deutsche Ringerliga	Germany
Win	35–5	(Cuba) Yowlys Bonne	6–2	16 November 2019	2019–2020 Deutsche Ringerliga	Germany
Win	34–5	(Azerbaijan) Akhmednabi Gvarzatilov	9–4	5 October 2019	2019–2020 Deutsche Ringerliga	Germany
Loss	33–5	(Russia) Zelimkhan Abakarov	5–5	28 September 2019	2019–2020 Deutsche Ringerliga	Germany
2019 Stepan Sargsyan Cup (gold) at 61 kg
Win	33–4	(Armenia) Arsen Harutyunyan	TF 12–2	23–24 July 2019	2019 Stepan Sargsyan Cup	Vanadzor, Armenia
Win	32–4	(Russia) Zagir Shakhiev	TF 10–0	23–24 July 2019	2019 Stepan Sargsyan Cup	Vanadzor, Armenia
Win	31–4	(Russia) Amirkhan Guvazhokov	TF 10–0	23–24 July 2019	2019 Stepan Sargsyan Cup	Vanadzor, Armenia
2019 U23 European Championships (gold) at 61 kg
Win	30–4	(Greece) Georgios Pilidis	4–0	4–10 March 2019	2019 U23 European Continental Championships	Novi Sad, Serbia
Win	29–4	(Azerbaijan) Asgar Mammadaliyev	TF 10–0	4–10 March 2019	2019 U23 European Continental Championships	Novi Sad, Serbia
Win	28–4	(Belarus) Uladzislau Koika	TF 12–0	4–10 March 2019	2019 U23 European Continental Championships	Novi Sad, Serbia
2019 Ivan Yarygin Golden Grand Prix (silver) at 57 kg
Loss	27–4	(Chechnya) Muslim Sadulaev	4–4	24 January 2019	Golden Grand Prix Ivan Yarygin 2019	Krasnoyarsk, Russia
Win	27–3	(Mongolia) Bekhbayar Erdenebat	5–5	24 January 2019	Golden Grand Prix Ivan Yarygin 2019	Krasnoyarsk, Russia
Win	26–3	(United States) Thomas Gilman	Fall	24 January 2019	Golden Grand Prix Ivan Yarygin 2019	Krasnoyarsk, Russia
Win	25–3	(Turkey) Ahmet Peker	TF 13–3	24 January 2019	Golden Grand Prix Ivan Yarygin 2019	Krasnoyarsk, Russia
2018 Alans International (gold) at 61 kg
Win	24–3	(Russia) Donduk-ool Khuresh-ool	6–0	7–9 December 2018	2018 Alans International	Vladikavkaz, Russia
Win	23–3	(Russia) Zhargal Damdinov	Fall	7–9 December 2018	2018 Alans International	Vladikavkaz, Russia
Win	22–3	(Georgia (country)) Beka Bujiashvili	TF 11–0	7–9 December 2018	2018 Alans International	Vladikavkaz, Russia
Win	21–3	(Russia) Ramiz Gamzatov	9–2	7–9 December 2018	2018 Alans International	Vladikavkaz, Russia
2018 International Cup (gold) at 61 kg
Win	20–3	(Russia) Eduard Grigorev	8–5	15–19 November 2018	2018 International Cup	Khasavyurt, Russia
Win	19–3	(Russia) Aliakhab Badrudinov	TF 13–2	15–19 November 2018	2018 International Cup	Khasavyurt, Russia
Win	18–3	(Russia) Amirkhan Guvazhokov	Fall	15–19 November 2018	2018 International Cup	Khasavyurt, Russia
Win	17–3	(Russia) Ramazan Ferzaliev	6–4	15–19 November 2018	2018 International Cup	Khasavyurt, Russia
2018 Roman Dmitriev Memorial (gold) at 61 kg
Win	16–3	(Russia) Christopher Potapov	TF 10–0	2–4 March 2018	2018 Roman Dmitriev Memorial	Yakutsk, Russia
Win	15–3	(Russia) Georgy Kichkin	TF 10–0	2–4 March 2018	2018 Roman Dmitriev Memorial	Yakutsk, Russia
Win	14-3	(Russia) Alexander Neustroev	TF 10–0	2–4 March 2018	2018 Roman Dmitriev Memorial	Yakutsk, Russia
Win	13–3	(Russia) Robert Manasyan	TF 12–0	2–4 March 2018	2018 Roman Dmitriev Memorial	Yakutsk, Russia
2017 Kunayev D.A. (silver) at 57 kg
Win	12–3	(Kazakhstan) Mukhambet Kuatbek	8–4	25–26 November 2017	2017 Kunayev D.A.	Taraz, Kazakhstan
Win	11–3	(Kazakhstan) Zhandos Karibai	TF 10–0	25–26 November 2017	2017 Kunayev D.A.	Taraz, Kazakhstan
Win	10–3	(Russia) Arzyl Artysh-ool	10–7	25–26 November 2017	2017 Kunayev D.A.	Taraz, Kazakhstan
Win	9–3	(Kazakhstan) Gabit Tolepbai	TF 10–0	25–26 November 2017	2017 Kunayev D.A.	Taraz, Kazakhstan
2017 International Cup (silver) at 57 kg
Loss	8–3	(Russia) Zaur Uguev	3–6	12–13 October 2017	2017 International Cup	Khasavyurt, Russia
Win	8–2	(Russia) Gairbekov Djabrail	TF 10–0	12–13 October 2017	2017 International Cup	Khasavyurt, Russia
Win	7–2	(Russia) Mukhammadkhon	9–8	12–13 October 2017	2017 International Cup	Khasavyurt, Russia
Win	6–2	(Kazakhstan) Rassul Kaliyev	TF 11–1	12–13 October 2017	2017 International Cup	Khasavyurt, Russia
2017 Roman Dmitriev Memorial (bronze) at 60 kg
Win	5–2	(Russia) Roman Mikhailov	TF 14–2	4–5 March 2017	2017 Roman Dmitriev Memorial	Yakutsk, Russia
Loss	4–2	(Russia) Ruslan Zhendaev	6–6	4–5 March 2017	2017 Roman Dmitriev Memorial	Yakutsk, Russia
Win	4–1	(Iran) Younes Aliakbari	12–3	4–5 March 2017	2017 Roman Dmitriev Memorial	Yakutsk, Russia
Win	3–1	(Russia) Ali Sheriev	10–4	4–5 March 2017	2017 Roman Dmitriev Memorial	Yakutsk, Russia
Win	2–1	(Russia) Revoly Samsonov	Fall	4–5 March 2017	2017 Roman Dmitriev Memorial	Yakutsk, Russia
2017 Ivan Yarygin Golden Grand Prix 14th at 57 kg
Loss	1–1	(Russia) Zelimkhan Abakarov	1–9	27 January 2017	Golden Grand Prix Ivan Yarygin 2017	Krasnoyarsk, Russia
Win	1–0	(Japan) Yuki Takahashi	8–2	27 January 2017	Golden Grand Prix Ivan Yarygin 2017	Krasnoyarsk, Russia
