= 2021 European Wrestling Championships – Men's freestyle 61 kg =

Wrestling competition

The men's freestyle 61 kg is a competition featured at the 2021 European Wrestling Championships, and will be held in Warsaw, Poland on April 20 and April 21.

== Medalists ==
Gold	Abasgadzhi Magomedov; Russia
Silver	Andrii Dzhelep; Ukraine
Bronze	Beka Lomtadze; Georgia
Bronze	Eduard Grigorev; Poland

== Results ==
Legend

- F — Won by fall

=== Final ===
Final
Andrii Dzhelep (UKR)	2
Abasgadzhi Magomedov (RUS)	12

=== Top half ===
Round of 32

Round of 16
Andrii Dzhelep (UKR)	7
Vladimir Egorov (MKD)	0
Akhmednabi Gvarzatilov (AZE)	10
Viktor Lyzen (GER)	0
Beka Lomtadze (GEO)	12
Dzimchyk Rynchynau (BLR)	0
Leonid Colesnic (MDA)	4^{F}
Sebastian Kolompar (SRB)	0

Quarterfinals
Andrii Dzhelep (UKR)	12
Akhmednabi Gvarzatilov (AZE)	9
Beka Lomtadze (GEO)	14
Leonid Colesnic (MDA)	8

Semifinals
Andrii Dzhelep (UKR)	5
Beka Lomtadze (GEO)	3

=== Bottom half ===
Round of 32
Eduard Grigorev (POL)	12
Ivan Guidea (ROU)	2

Round of 16
Emrah Ormanoğlu (TUR)	11
Simone Piroddu (ITA)	1
Georgi Vangelov (BUL)	2
Abasgadzhi Magomedov (RUS)	5^{F}
Daniel Popov (ISR)	3
Richárd Vilhelm (HUN)	2
Arman Eloyan (FRA)	0
Eduard Grigorev (POL)	7

Quarterfinals
Emrah Ormanoğlu (TUR)	0
Abasgadzhi Magomedov (RUS)	6^{F}
Daniel Popov (ISR)	0
Eduard Grigorev (POL)	11

Semifinals
Abasgadzhi Magomedov (RUS)	4
Eduard Grigorev (POL)	2

=== Repechage ===
Repechage round 2
Vladimir Egorov (MKD)	2
Akhmednabi Gvarzatilov (AZE)	6
Georgi Vangelov (BUL)	2
Emrah Ormanoğlu (TUR)	0

Bronze medal match
Akhmednabi Gvarzatilov (AZE)	7
Beka Lomtadze (GEO)	9
Georgi Vangelov (BUL)	2
Eduard Grigorev (POL)	4

== Final standing ==
Rank	Athlete
1st place, gold medalist(s)	Abasgadzhi Magomedov (RUS)
2nd place, silver medalist(s)	Andrii Dzhelep (UKR)
3rd place, bronze medalist(s)	Beka Lomtadze (GEO)
3rd place, bronze medalist(s)	Eduard Grigorev (POL)
5	Akhmednabi Gvarzatilov (AZE)
5	Georgi Vangelov (BUL)
7	Leonid Colesnic (MDA)
8	Emrah Ormanoğlu (TUR)
9	Daniel Popov (ISR)
10	Richárd Vilhelm (HUN)
11	Ivan Guidea (ROU)
12	Vladimir Egorov (MKD)
13	Simone Piroddu (ITA)
14	Sebastian Kolompar (SRB)
15	Arman Eloyan (FRA)
16	Viktor Lyzen (GER)
17	Dzimchyk Rynchynau (BLR)
