= Timor-Leste at the 2026 Asian Games =

- IOC code: TLS
- NOC: National Olympic Committee of Timor Leste

in Aichi Prefecture and Nagoya, Japan 19 September 2026 – 4 October 2026
- Competitors: 12 (7 men and 5 women) in 7 sports
- Medals: Gold 0 Silver 0 Bronze 0 Total 0

Asian Games appearances (overview)
- 2002; 2006; 2010; 2014; 2018; 2022; 2026

Timor-Leste was represented at the 2026 Asian Games in Aichi Prefecture and Nagoya, Japan by the National Olympic Committee of Timor Leste. Aichi–Nagoya 2026 marked the seventh occasion that Timor-Leste had competed at the Asian Games following its debut at the 2002 Asian Games in Busan, South Korea.

In total, 12 athletes including seven men and five women represented Timor-Leste in seven different sports including archery, athletics, swimming, taekwondo, volleyball, weightlifting and wrestling.

== Background ==
Aichi Prefecture and Nagoya, Japan were awarded the rights to host the 2026 Asian Games in September 2016. The games would take place between 19 September and 4 October 2026.

The 2026 Asian Games marked Timor-Leste's seventh participation at the games, after making its debut at the 2002 Asian Games in Busan, South Korea.

== Competitors ==
In total, 12 athletes represented Timor-Leste at the 2026 Asian Games in Aichi–Nagoya, Japan across seven different sports.

Sport	Men	Women	Total
Archery	1	1	2
Athletics	2	1	3
Swimming	0	1	1
Taekwondo	0	1	1
Volleyball	2	0	2
Weightlifting	1	1	2
Wrestling	1	0	1
Total	7	5	12

== Archery ==
In total, two East Timorese athletes participated in the archery events – Jenifer Maia Da Cruz and Juan Paul Rogimus Da Cruz.

Athlete	Event	Ranking round		Round of 32	Round of 16	Quarterfinals	Semifinals	Final / BM	
Athlete	Event	Score	Seed	Opposition Score	Opposition Score	Opposition Score	Opposition Score	Opposition Score	Rank
Juan Paul Rogimus Da Cruz	Men's individual	177	58 Q	Colas (PHI); L 0–6	Did not advance				
Jenifer Maia Da Cruz	Women's individual	254	53 Q	Alali (UAE); L 0–6	Did not advance				
Juan Paul Rogimus Da Cruz; Jenifer Maia Da Cruz	Mixed team	431	20	—N/a	Malaysia (MAS); L DNS	Did not advance			

== Athletics ==
In total, three East Timorese athletes participated in the athletics events – Manuel Ataide, Levanita Da Costa and Mouzinho Belo Da Costa Amaral.

Athlete	Event	Heat		Semifinal		Final	
Athlete	Event	Result	Rank	Result	Rank	Result	Rank
Manuel Ataide	Men's 800 m	1:55.67	7	—N/a		Did not advance	
Mouzinho Belo Da Costa Amaral	Men's 100 m	11.68	7	Did not advance			
Mouzinho Belo Da Costa Amaral	Men's 200 m	23.66	6	Did not advance			
Levanita Da Costa	Women's 200 m	27.92	9	Did not advance			
Levanita Da Costa	Women's 400 m	1:03.69	6	—N/a		Did not advance	

== Swimming ==
In total, one East Timorese athlete participated in the swimming events – Salena Marlin.

Athlete	Event	Heat		Final	
Athlete	Event	Time	Rank	Time	Rank
Salena Marlin	Women's 50 m freestyle	37.85	35	Did not advance	

== Taekwondo ==
In total, one East Timorese athlete participated in the taekwondo events – Ana Belo.

Athlete	Event	Round of 16	Quarterfinals	Semifinals	Final	
Athlete	Event	Opposition Result	Opposition Result	Opposition Result	Opposition Result	Rank
Ana Belo	Women's –49 kg	Okamoto (JPN); L 0–2	Did not advance			

== Volleyball ==
In total, two East Timorese athletes participated in the volleyball events – Joel Savio Valente and Joninho Fernandes Xavier.

Athletes	Event	Preliminary round				Round of 16	Quarterfinals	Semifinals	Final / BM	
Athletes	Event	Opposition Score	Opposition Score	Opposition Score	Rank	Opposition Score	Opposition Score	Opposition Score	Opposition Score	Rank
Joninho Fernandes Xavier; Joel Savio Valente	Men's beach	Aghajanighasab / Pouarasgari (IRI); L 0–2 (12–21, 4–21)	Muadpha / Muneekul (THA); L 0–2 (17–21, 18–21)	Al-Housni / Al Mamari (OMA); L 0–2 (13–21, 12–21)	4	Did not advance				

== Weightlifting ==
In total, two East Timorese athletes participated in the weightlifting events – Ester Elisaria Alves and Nivio Fernando Da Costa Silva Soares.

Athlete	Event	Snatch		Clean & Jerk		Total	Rank
Athlete	Event	Result	Rank	Result	Rank	Total	Rank
Nivio Fernando Da Costa Silva Soares	Men's −70 kg	105	9	120	9	225	9
Ester Elisaria Alves	Women's −57 kg	—N/a	DNF	—N/a			NM

== Wrestling ==
In total, one East Timorese athlete participated in the wrestling events – Lourenco De Oliveira Da Costa.

Key:

- ST (ranking points: 4–0 or 0–4) – Great superiority – the loser without technical points and a margin of victory of at least 8 (Greco-Roman) or 10 (freestyle) points.

Athlete	Event	Round of 32	Round of 16	Quarterfinals	Semifinals	Repechage	Final / BM	
Athlete	Event	Opposition Result	Opposition Result	Opposition Result	Opposition Result	Opposition Result	Opposition Result	Rank
Lourenco De Oliveira Da Costa	Men's −57 kg	Bye	Uulu (KGZ); L 0–11 ^{ST}	Did not advance				
