= 2021 World Wrestling Championships – Men's freestyle 61 kg =

World Wrestling competitions

Men's freestyle 61 kg at the 2021 World Championships
- Venue: Nye Jordal Amfi
- Dates: 2–3 October 2021
- Competitors: 25 from 25 nations

Medalists
gold medal	Abasgadzhi Magomedov	RWF
silver medal	Daton Fix	United States
bronze medal	Arsen Harutyunyan	Armenia
bronze medal	Toshihiro Hasegawa	Japan

The men's freestyle 61 kilograms is a competition featured at the 2021 World Wrestling Championships, and was held in Oslo, Norway on 2 and 3 October.

This freestyle wrestling competition consists of a single-elimination tournament, with a repechage used to determine the winner of two bronze medals. The two finalists face off for gold and silver medals. Each wrestler who loses to one of the two finalists moves into the repechage, culminating in a pair of bronze medal matches featuring the semifinal losers each facing the remaining repechage opponent from their half of the bracket.

== Results ==
Legend

- F — Won by fall
- WO — Won by walkover

=== Final ===
Final
Daton Fix (USA)	1
Abasgadzhi Magomedov (RWF)	4

=== Top half ===
Round of 32
Chakir Ansari (MAR)	1
Arman Eloyan (FRA)	12
Daton Fix (USA)	11
Georgi Vangelov (BUL)	0
Kim Sung-gwon (KOR)	2
Ravinder Dahiya (IND)	13

Round of 16
Adlan Askarov (KAZ)	10
Arsen Harutyunyan (ARM)	18
Alibeg Alibegov (BRN)	8
Igor Chichioi (MDA)	1
Arman Eloyan (FRA)	0
Daton Fix (USA)	10
Ravinder Dahiya (IND)	6
Beka Lomtadze (GEO)	2

Quarterfinals
Arsen Harutyunyan (ARM)	8
Alibeg Alibegov (BRN)	2
Daton Fix (USA)	10
Ravinder Dahiya (IND)	0

Semifinals
Arsen Harutyunyan (ARM)	0
Daton Fix (USA)	10

=== Bottom half ===
Round of 32
Nikolay Okhlopkov (ROU)	5
Andrei Bekreneu (BLR)	2
Nico Megerle (GER)	1
Toshihiro Hasegawa (JPN)	1
Rahman Amouzad (IRI)	5
Gamzatgadzsi Halidov (HUN)	0
Ulukbek Zholdoshbekov (KGZ)	7
Tümenbilegiin Tüvshintulga (MGL)	7
Yaroslav Hurskyy (UKR)	5
Kanan Heybatov (AZE)	4
Kenneth Koech (KEN)	0
Emrah Ormanoğlu (TUR)	11

Round of 16
Eduard Grigorev (POL)	6
Nikolay Okhlopkov (ROU)	1
Toshihiro Hasegawa (JPN)	9
Rahman Amouzad (IRI)	5
Tümenbilegiin Tüvshintulga (MGL)	4
Yaroslav Hurskyy (UKR)	1
Emrah Ormanoğlu (TUR)	0
Abasgadzhi Magomedov (RWF)	6^{F}

Quarterfinals
Eduard Grigorev (POL)	3
Toshihiro Hasegawa (JPN)	6
Tümenbilegiin Tüvshintulga (MGL)	0
Abasgadzhi Magomedov (RWF)	6^{F}

Semifinals
Toshihiro Hasegawa (JPN)	0
Abasgadzhi Magomedov (RWF)	10

=== Repechage ===
Repechage round 1
Georgi Vangelov (BUL)	10
Arman Eloyan (FRA)	0

Repechage round 2
Georgi Vangelov (BUL)	8
Ravinder Dahiya (IND)	2^{F}
Emrah Ormanoğlu (TUR)
Tümenbilegiin Tüvshintulga (MGL)	WO

Bronze medals
Ravinder Dahiya (IND)	0
Arsen Harutyunyan (ARM)	10
Tümenbilegiin Tüvshintulga (MGL)	1
Toshihiro Hasegawa (JPN)	12

== Final standing ==
Rank	Athlete
1st place, gold medalist(s)	Abasgadzhi Magomedov (RWF)
2nd place, silver medalist(s)	Daton Fix (USA)
3rd place, bronze medalist(s)	Arsen Harutyunyan (ARM)
3rd place, bronze medalist(s)	Toshihiro Hasegawa (JPN)
5	Ravinder Dahiya (IND)
5	Tümenbilegiin Tüvshintulga (MGL)
7	Georgi Vangelov (BUL)
8	Arman Eloyan (FRA)
9	Emrah Ormanoğlu (TUR)
10	Alibeg Alibegov (BRN)
11	Rahman Amouzad (IRI)
12	Eduard Grigorev (POL)
13	Nikolay Okhlopkov (ROU)
14	Yaroslav Hurskyy (UKR)
15	Adlan Askarov (KAZ)
16	Ulukbek Zholdoshbekov (KGZ)
17	Kanan Heybatov (AZE)
18	Andrei Bekreneu (BLR)
19	Beka Lomtadze (GEO)
20	Kim Sung-gwon (KOR)
21	Nico Megerle (GER)
22	Igor Chichioi (MDA)
23	Chakir Ansari (MAR)
24	Gamzatgadzsi Halidov (HUN)
25	Kenneth Koech (KEN)
