= Wrestling at the 2026 Asian Games – Men's freestyle 57 kg =

Men's freestyle 57 kg at the 2026 Asian Games
- Venue: Inae Sports Center
- Date: 3 October 2026
- Competitors: 21 from 21 nations

Medalists
gold medal	Aman Sehrawat	India
silver medal	Han Chong-song	North Korea
bronze medal	Zou Wanhao	China
bronze medal	Aiaal Belolyubskii	Tajikistan

The men's freestyle 57 kilograms wrestling competition at the 2026 Asian Games in Nagoya was held on 3 October 2026 at the Inae Sports Center.

This freestyle wrestling competition consists of a single-elimination tournament, with a repechage used to determine the winner of two bronze medals. The two finalists face off for gold and silver medals. Each wrestler who loses to one of the two finalists moves into the repechage, culminating in a pair of bronze medal matches featuring the semifinal losers each facing the remaining repechage opponent from their half of the bracket.

== Schedule ==
All times are Japan Standard Time (UTC+09:00)

Date	Time	Event
Saturday, 3 October 2026	10:30	Qualifications
Saturday, 3 October 2026	10:30	1/8 finals
Saturday, 3 October 2026	10:30	1/4 finals
Saturday, 3 October 2026	10:30	Semifinals
Saturday, 3 October 2026	10:30	Repechages
Saturday, 3 October 2026	18:00	Finals

== Results ==
Legend

- F — Won by fall

=== Main bracket ===
==== Final ====
Final
Han Chong-song (PRK)	7
Aman Sehrawat (IND)	11

==== Top half ====
Qualifications
Han Chong-song (PRK)	10
Mahabub Alam (BAN)	0
Bekzat Almaz Uulu (KGZ)	10
Hussein Khudur (IRQ)	0
Ahmad Mansoor Baryalai (AFG)	5
Mönkh-Erdeniin Davaabandi (MGL)	16

1/8 finals
Edmund Gaso (PHI)	0
Zou Wanhao (CHN)	11
Han Chong-song (PRK)	2^{F}
Gayan Ekanayake (SRI)	0
Lourenço Pinto (TLS)	0
Bekzat Almaz Uulu (KGZ)	11^{F}
Mönkh-Erdeniin Davaabandi (MGL)	0
Phạm Như Duy (VIE)	10

1/4 finals
Zou Wanhao (CHN)	3
Han Chong-song (PRK)	10
Bekzat Almaz Uulu (KGZ)	8^{F}
Phạm Như Duy (VIE)	0

Semifinals
Han Chong-song (PRK)	4
Bekzat Almaz Uulu (KGZ)	0

==== Bottom half ====
Qualifications
Ibrahim Al-Tabbaa (SYR)	10
Isaac Wong (HKG)	0
Gulomjon Abdullaev (UZB)	2
Yamato Ogawa (JPN)	4

1/8 finals
Ali Momeni (IRI)	1
Aiaal Belolyubskii (TJK)	4
Ibrahim Al-Tabbaa (SYR)	2
Kim Sung-gwon (KOR)	12
Aman Sehrawat (IND)	20
Yamato Ogawa (JPN)	9
Nurdanat Aitanov (KAZ)	10
Soeun Sophors (CAM)	0

1/4 finals
Aiaal Belolyubskii (TJK)	6
Kim Sung-gwon (KOR)	2
Aman Sehrawat (IND)	12
Nurdanat Aitanov (KAZ)	1

Semifinals
Aiaal Belolyubskii (TJK)	8
Aman Sehrawat (IND)	14

=== Repechage ===
Repechage 1
Mahabub Alam (BAN)	13^{F}
Gayan Ekanayake (SRI)	8

Repechage 2
Mahabub Alam (BAN)	0
Zou Wanhao (CHN)	10
Yamato Ogawa (JPN)	6
Nurdanat Aitanov (KAZ)	0

Bronze medal matches
Zou Wanhao (CHN)	9
Bekzat Almaz Uulu (KGZ)	6
Yamato Ogawa (JPN)	1
Aiaal Belolyubskii (TJK)	1

== Final standing ==
Rank	Athlete
1st place, gold medalist(s)	Aman Sehrawat (IND)
2nd place, silver medalist(s)	Han Chong-song (PRK)
3rd place, bronze medalist(s)	Zou Wanhao (CHN)
3rd place, bronze medalist(s)	Aiaal Belolyubskii (TJK)
5	Bekzat Almaz Uulu (KGZ)
5	Yamato Ogawa (JPN)
7	Mahabub Alam (BAN)
8	Kim Sung-gwon (KOR)
9	Ibrahim Al-Tabbaa (SYR)
10	Nurdanat Aitanov (KAZ)
11	Mönkh-Erdeniin Davaabandi (MGL)
12	Phạm Như Duy (VIE)
13	Ahmad Mansoor Baryalai (AFG)
14	Gulomjon Abdullaev (UZB)
15	Ali Momeni (IRI)
16	Gayan Ekanayake (SRI)
17	Hussein Khudur (IRQ)
18	Isaac Wong (HKG)
19	Soeun Sophors (CAM)
20	Edmund Gaso (PHI)
21	Lourenço Pinto (TLS)
