= Wrestling at the 2022 Asian Games – Men's freestyle 57 kg =

Men's freestyle 57 kg at the 2022 Asian Games
- Venue: Lin'an Sports and Culture Centre
- Date: 6 October 2023
- Competitors: 15 from 15 nations

Medalists
| gold medal | Toshihiro Hasegawa | Japan |
| silver medal | Han Chong-song | North Korea |
| bronze medal | Narmandakhyn Nasanbuyan | Mongolia |
| bronze medal | Aman Sehrawat | India |

The men's freestyle 57 kilograms wrestling competition at the 2022 Asian Games in Hangzhou was held on 6 October 2023 at the Lin'an Sports and Culture Centre.

This freestyle wrestling competition consists of a single-elimination tournament, with a repechage used to determine the winner of two bronze medals. The two finalists face off for gold and silver medals. Each wrestler who loses to one of the two finalists moves into the repechage, culminating in a pair of bronze medal matches featuring the semifinal losers each facing the remaining repechage opponent from their half of the bracket.

== Schedule ==
All times are China Standard Time (UTC+08:00)

| Date | Time | Event |
|---|---|---|
| Friday, 6 October 2023 | 10:00 | 1/8 finals |
| Friday, 6 October 2023 | 10:00 | 1/4 finals |
| Friday, 6 October 2023 | 10:00 | Semifinals |
| Friday, 6 October 2023 | 10:00 | Repechages |
| Friday, 6 October 2023 | 17:00 | Finals |

== Results ==
Legend

- F — Won by fall

=== Main bracket ===
1/8 finals
Narmandakhyn Nasanbuyan (MGL) | 14^{F}
Soeun Sophors (CAM) | 2
Muhammad Bilal (PAK) | 0
Rakhat Kalzhan (KAZ) | 10
Bekzat Almaz Uulu (KGZ) | 10
Nattawut Kaewkhuanchum (THA) | 0
Liu Minghu (CHN) | 0
Toshihiro Hasegawa (JPN) | 7
Nodirjon Safarov (UZB) | 8
Hikmatullo Vohidov (TJK) | 4
Ebrahim Khari (IRI) | 10
Alvin Lobreguito (PHI) | 0
Kim Sung-gwon (KOR) | 1
Aman Sehrawat (IND) | 6

1/4 finals
Han Chong-song (PRK) | 17
Narmandakhyn Nasanbuyan (MGL) | 6
Rakhat Kalzhan (KAZ) | 0
Bekzat Almaz Uulu (KGZ) | 10
Toshihiro Hasegawa (JPN) | 12
Nodirjon Safarov (UZB) | 2
Ebrahim Khari (IRI) | 8
Aman Sehrawat (IND) | 19

Semifinals
Han Chong-song (PRK) | 4
Bekzat Almaz Uulu (KGZ) | 2
Toshihiro Hasegawa (JPN) | 12
Aman Sehrawat (IND) | 10

Gold medal match
Han Chong-song (PRK) | 3
Toshihiro Hasegawa (JPN) | 7

=== Repechage ===
Repechage round 1
Liu Minghu (CHN) | 7
Nodirjon Safarov (UZB) | 4

Bronze medal matches
Narmandakhyn Nasanbuyan (MGL) | 8
Bekzat Almaz Uulu (KGZ) | 2
Liu Minghu (CHN) | 0
Aman Sehrawat (IND) | 11

== Final standing ==
| Rank | Athlete |
|---|---|
| 1st place, gold medalist(s) | Toshihiro Hasegawa (JPN) |
| 2nd place, silver medalist(s) | Han Chong-song (PRK) |
| 3rd place, bronze medalist(s) | Narmandakhyn Nasanbuyan (MGL) |
| 3rd place, bronze medalist(s) | Aman Sehrawat (IND) |
| 5 | Bekzat Almaz Uulu (KGZ) |
| 5 | Liu Minghu (CHN) |
| 7 | Ebrahim Khari (IRI) |
| 8 | Nodirjon Safarov (UZB) |
| 9 | Rakhat Kalzhan (KAZ) |
| 10 | Hikmatullo Vohidov (TJK) |
| 11 | Kim Sung-gwon (KOR) |
| 12 | Soeun Sophors (CAM) |
| 13 | Muhammad Bilal (PAK) |
| 14 | Nattawut Kaewkhuanchum (THA) |
| 15 | Alvin Lobreguito (PHI) |
