= Wrestling at the 2022 Mediterranean Games – Men's freestyle 65 kg =

Wrestling competitions

Men's Freestyle 65 kg at the 2022 Mediterranean Games
- Venue: EMEC Hall
- Date: 27–28 June 2022
- Competitors: 10 from 10 nations

Medalists
gold medal	Zelimkhan Abakarov	Albania
silver medal	Yehia Hafez	Egypt
bronze medal	Stevan Mićić	Serbia
bronze medal	Vladimir Egorov	North Macedonia

The men's freestyle 65 kg competition of the wrestling events at the 2022 Mediterranean Games in Oran, Algeria, was held 27–28 June 2022 at the EMEC Hall.

== Results ==
Legend

- F — Won by fall

Round of 16
Juan Pablo González (ESP)	2
Abdelhak Kherbache (ALG)	2
Colin Realbuto (ITA)	4
Ahmad Dirki (SYR)	7

Quarterfinals
Münir Recep Aktaş (TUR)	4
Zelimkhan Abakarov (ALB)	8
Stevan Mićić (SRB)	10
Quentin Sticker (FRA)	0
Vladimir Egorov (MKD)	5
Yehia Hafez (EGY)	5
Abdelhak Kherbache (ALG)	6
Ahmad Dirki (SYR)	5

Semifinals
Zelimkhan Abakarov (ALB)	9
Stevan Mićić (SRB)	0
Yehia Hafez (EGY)	9
Abdelhak Kherbache (ALG)	5

Final
Zelimkhan Abakarov (ALB)	11
Yehia Hafez (EGY)	0

Bronze medal match
Münir Recep Aktaş (TUR)	0
Stevan Mićić (SRB)	4
Vladimir Egorov (MKD)	7
Abdelhak Kherbache (ALG)	2
