= 2022 European Wrestling Championships – Men's freestyle 57 kg =

Wrestling competition

Men's freestyle 57 kg at the 2022 European Wrestling Championships
- Venue: BOK Sports Hall
- Location: Budapest, Hungary
- Dates: 28-29 March
- Competitors: 12

Medalists
gold medal	Vladimir Egorov	North Macedonia
silver medal	Aliabbas Rzazade	Azerbaijan
bronze medal	Manvel Khndzrtsyan	Armenia
bronze medal	Beka Bujiashvili	Georgia

The men's freestyle 57 kg was a competition featured at the 2022 European Wrestling Championships, and was held in Budapest, Hungary on March 28 and 29.

== Results ==
Legend

- F — Won by fall

=== Main bracket ===
1/8 finals
Gary Giordimaina (MLT)	0
Niklas Stechele (GER)	10
Manvel Khndzrtsyan (ARM)	11
Anatolii Buruian (MDA)	6
Martin Židzik (SVK)	0
Răzvan Kovacs (ROU)	11
Aliabbas Rzazade (AZE)	7
Levan Metreveli (ESP)	0

Quarterfinals
Vladimir Egorov (MKD)	5
Niklas Stechele (GER)	4
Manvel Khndzrtsyan (ARM)	14
Muhammet Karavuş (TUR)	4
Beka Bujiashvili (GEO)	10
Răzvan Kovacs (ROU)	0
Aliabbas Rzazade (AZE)	9
Mikyay Naim (BUL)	6

Semifinals
Vladimir Egorov (MKD)	10
Manvel Khndzrtsyan (ARM)	0
Beka Bujiashvili (GEO)	0
Aliabbas Rzazade (AZE)	10

Final
Vladimir Egorov (MKD)	8
Aliabbas Rzazade (AZE)	6

=== Repechage ===
Repechage round 1
Levan Metreveli (ESP)	0
Mikyay Naim (BUL)	11

Bronze medal match
Niklas Stechele (GER)	2
Manvel Khndzrtsyan (ARM)	6
Mikyay Naim (BUL)	0
Beka Bujiashvili (GEO)	11

== Final standing ==
Rank	Wrestler	UWW Points
1st place, gold medalist(s)	Vladimir Egorov (MKD)	10000
2nd place, silver medalist(s)	Aliabbas Rzazade (AZE)	8000
3rd place, bronze medalist(s)	Beka Bujiashvili (GEO)	6500
3rd place, bronze medalist(s)	Manvel Khndzrtsyan (ARM)	6500
5	Mikyay Naim (BUL)	5000
5	Niklas Stechele (GER)	5000
7	Răzvan Kovacs (ROU)	4400
8	Anatolii Buruian (MDA)	4000
9	Muhammet Karavuş (TUR)	3500
10	Gary Giordimaina (MLT)	3100
11	Martin Židzik (SVK)	1000
12	Levan Metreveli (ESP)	800
