= 2022 U23 World Wrestling Championships – Men's freestyle 57 kg =

Wrestling competitions

Men's freestyle 57 kg at the 2022 U23 World Championships
- Venue: Pontevedra Municipal Sports Hall
- Dates: 21–22 October
- Competitors: 19 from 19 nations

Medalists
gold medal	Aman Sehrawat	India
silver medal	Ahmet Duman	Turkey
bronze medal	Kamil Kerymov	Ukraine
bronze medal	Bekzat Almaz Uulu	Kyrgyzstan

The men's freestyle 57 kg is a competition featured at the 2022 U23 World Wrestling Championships, and was held in Pontevedra, Spain on 21 and 22 October 2022. The qualification rounds were held on 20 October while medal matches were held on the 2nd day of the competition. A total of 19 wrestlers competed in this event, limited to athletes whose body weight was less than 57 kilograms.

This freestyle wrestling competition consists of a single-elimination tournament, with a repechage used to determine the winner of two bronze medals. The two finalists face off for gold and silver medals. Each wrestler who loses to one of the two finalists moves into the repechage, culminating in a pair of bronze medal matches featuring the semifinal losers each facing the remaining repechage opponent from their half of the bracket.

== Results ==
Legend

- F — Won by fall
- WO — Won by walkover

=== Final ===
Final
Ahmet Duman (TUR)	4
Aman Sehrawat (IND)	12

=== Top half ===
Round of 32
Ahmad Javan (IRI)	5
Manvel Khndzrtsyan (ARM)	4

Round of 16
Tadeu Deus (ANG)	0
Giorgi Gegelashvili (GEO)	10
Ahmad Javan (IRI)	4
Horst Lehr (GER)	9
Diego Zuluaga (COL)	0
Kamil Kerymov (UKR)	10
Ahmet Duman (TUR)	10
Tofig Aliyev (AZE)	0

Quarterfinals
Giorgi Gegelashvili (GEO)	11
Horst Lehr (GER)	5
Kamil Kerymov (UKR)	4
Ahmet Duman (TUR)	14

Semifinals
Giorgi Gegelashvili (GEO)	0
Ahmet Duman (TUR)	10

=== Bottom half ===
Round of 32
Daulet Temirzhanov (KAZ)	2
Batkhuyagiin Mönkh-Erdene (MGL)	7
Logan Sloan (CAN)	0
Toshiya Abe (JPN)	10

Round of 16
Vito Arujau (USA)	6
Bekzat Almaz Uulu (KGZ)	11
Batkhuyagiin Mönkh-Erdene (MGL)	10
Adrián López (ESP)	0
Thomas Epp (SUI)	0
Toshiya Abe (JPN)	6
Hansana Ganegodage (SRI)	0
Aman Sehrawat (IND)	11

Quarterfinals
Bekzat Almaz Uulu (KGZ)	8^{F}
Batkhuyagiin Mönkh-Erdene (MGL)	1
Toshiya Abe (JPN)	2
Aman Sehrawat (IND)	13

Semifinals
Bekzat Almaz Uulu (KGZ)	5
Aman Sehrawat (IND)	10

=== Repechage ===
Repechage round 2
Tofig Aliyev (AZE)	2
Kamil Kerymov (UKR)	4^{F}
Hansana Ganegodage (SRI)	WO
Toshiya Abe (JPN)

Bronze medals
Kamil Kerymov (UKR)	17
Giorgi Gegelashvili (GEO)	7
~~Hansana Ganegodage (SRI)~~
Bekzat Almaz Uulu (KGZ)	WO

== Final standing ==
Rank	Athlete
1st place, gold medalist(s)	Aman Sehrawat (IND)
2nd place, silver medalist(s)	Ahmet Duman (TUR)
3rd place, bronze medalist(s)	Kamil Kerymov (UKR)
3rd place, bronze medalist(s)	Bekzat Almaz Uulu (KGZ)
5	Giorgi Gegelashvili (GEO)
6	Toshiya Abe (JPN)
7	Batkhuyagiin Mönkh-Erdene (MGL)
8	Horst Lehr (GER)
9	Ahmad Javan (IRI)
10	Vito Arujau (USA)
11	Manvel Khndzrtsyan (ARM)
12	Daulet Temirzhanov (KAZ)
13	Tofig Aliyev (AZE)
14	Thomas Epp (SUI)
15	Tadeu Deus (ANG)
16	Diego Zuluaga (COL)
17	Adrián López (ESP)
18	Logan Sloan (CAN)
—	Hansana Ganegodage (SRI)
