= 2021 U23 World Wrestling Championships – Men's freestyle 57 kg =

The men's freestyle 57 kilograms is a competition featured at the 2021 U23 World Wrestling Championships, and was held in Belgrade, Serbia, on 5 and 6 November.

== Medalists ==
Gold	Aliabbas Rzazade; Azerbaijan
Silver	Bekbolot Myrzanazar-Uulu; Kyrgyzstan
Bronze	Ahmad Javan; Iran
Bronze	Manvel Khndzrtsyan; Armenia

== Results ==
Legend

- F — Won by fall

=== Final ===
Final
Bekbolot Myrzanazar-Uulu (KGZ)	6
Aliabbas Rzazade (AZE)	7

=== Top half ===
Round of 32

Round of 16
Diamantino Iuna Fafé (GBS)	0
Bekbolot Myrzanazar-Uulu (KGZ)	10
Pat Glory (USA)	11
Ahmad Javan (IRI)	11
Hafız Can Hasdemir (TUR)	0
Petru Crăciun (MDA)	10
Logan Sloan (CAN)	0
Dzmitry Shamela (BLR)	10

Quarterfinals
Bekbolot Myrzanazar-Uulu (KGZ)	7
Ahmad Javan (IRI)	0
Petru Crăciun (MDA)	8
Dzmitry Shamela (BLR)	11

Semifinals
Bekbolot Myrzanazar-Uulu (KGZ)	10
Dzmitry Shamela (BLR)	0

=== Bottom half ===
Round of 32
Batkhuyagiin Mönkh-Erdene (MGL)	11
Aid Salihasi (MKD)	0
Ramaz Turmanidze (GEO)	9
Saurabh Igave (IND)	11
Simone Piroddu (ITA)	12
Ali Aburumaila (PLE)	4
Rakhat Kalzhan (KAZ)	4
Ramazan Abdurakhimov (RUS)	1
Aliabbas Rzazade (AZE)	5
Niklas Stechele (GER)	1
Arslan Rakhimov (UZB)	1
Muhamad Ikromov (TJK)	7
Vladlen Opanasenko (UKR)	13
Rayan Hawsawi (KSA)	3
Manvel Khndzrtsyan (ARM)	11
Nils Leutert (SUI)	0

Round of 16
Batkhuyagiin Mönkh-Erdene (MGL)	8
Saurabh Igave (IND)	3^{F}
Simone Piroddu (ITA)	2
Rakhat Kalzhan (KAZ)	10^{F}
Aliabbas Rzazade (AZE)	10
Muhamad Ikromov (TJK)	1
Vladlen Opanasenko (UKR)	6
Manvel Khndzrtsyan (ARM)	8

Quarterfinals
Saurabh Igave (IND)	7
Rakhat Kalzhan (KAZ)	2
Aliabbas Rzazade (AZE)	9
Manvel Khndzrtsyan (ARM)	5

Semifinals
Saurabh Igave (IND)	10
Aliabbas Rzazade (AZE)	10

=== Repechage ===
Repechage round 1
Niklas Stechele (GER)	0
Muhamad Ikromov (TJK)	11

Repechage round 2
Diamantino Iuna Fafé (GBS)	8
Ahmad Javan (IRI)	18
Muhamad Ikromov (TJK)	6
Manvel Khndzrtsyan (ARM)	8

Bronze medals
Ahmad Javan (IRI)	3
Dzmitry Shamela (BLR)	2
Manvel Khndzrtsyan (ARM)	10
Saurabh Igave (IND)	0
