= Wrestling at the 2023 Pan American Games – Men's freestyle 57 kg =

Men's Freestyle 57 kg at the 2023 Pan American Games
- Venue: Olympic Training Center in Ñuñoa
- Dates: November 1
- Competitors: 8 from 8 nations

Medalists
Gold medal	Zane Richards	United States
Silver medal	Óscar Tigreros	Colombia
Bronze medal	Darian Cruz	Puerto Rico
Bronze medal	Osmany Diversent	Cuba

The men's freestyle 57 kg competition of the Wrestling events at the 2023 Pan American Games in Ñuñoa was held on November 1.

== Qualification ==
The winner of each weight category at the 2021 Junior Pan American Games in Cali, Colombia qualified directly, along with the top four at the 2022 Pan American Wrestling Championships and 2023 Pan American Wrestling Championships. The host country (Chile) is guaranteed a spot in each event, but its athletes must compete in both the 2022 and 2023 Pan American Championship. If Chile does not qualify at any of the first two events, it will take the fourth spot available at the 2023 Pan American Championships. A further six wildcards (four men and two women) will be awarded to nations without any qualified athlete but took part in the qualification tournaments.

== Schedule ==
All times are local (UTC−3)

Date	Time	Event
Wednesday, 1 November 2023
Wednesday, 1 November 2023	10:00	Quarterfinals
Wednesday, 1 November 2023	11:00	Semifinals
Wednesday, 1 November 2023	17:00	Finals

== Results ==
Legend

- F — Won by fall
- WO — Won by walkover

=== Final ===
Quarterfinals		Semifinals		Finals
Edwin Segura (EAI)	0
Darian Cruz (PUR)	4	Darian Cruz (PUR)	2
Zane Richards (USA)	WO	Zane Richards (USA)	8
~~Juan Rubelín Ramírez (DOM)~~				Zane Richards (USA)	10
Osmany Diversent (CUB)	5			Óscar Tigreros (COL)	0
Pedro Mejías (VEN)	3	Osmany Diversent (CUB)	12
Óscar Tigreros (COL)	12	Óscar Tigreros (COL)	14
David Almendra (ARG)	0

=== Repechage ===
Bronze medal match
~~Juan Rubelín Ramírez (DOM)~~
Darian Cruz (PUR)	WO
David Almendra (ARG)	0
Osmany Diversent (CUB)	2^{F}

== Final standing ==
Rank	Athlete
1st place, gold medalist(s)	Zane Richards (USA)
2nd place, silver medalist(s)	Óscar Tigreros (COL)
3rd place, bronze medalist(s)	Darian Cruz (PUR)
3rd place, bronze medalist(s)	Osmany Diversent (CUB)
5	David Almendra (ARG)
6	Pedro Mejías (VEN)
7	Edwin Segura (EAI)
—	Juan Rubelín Ramírez (DOM)
