= Vladimir Egorov (wrestler) =

Macedonian freestyle wrestler

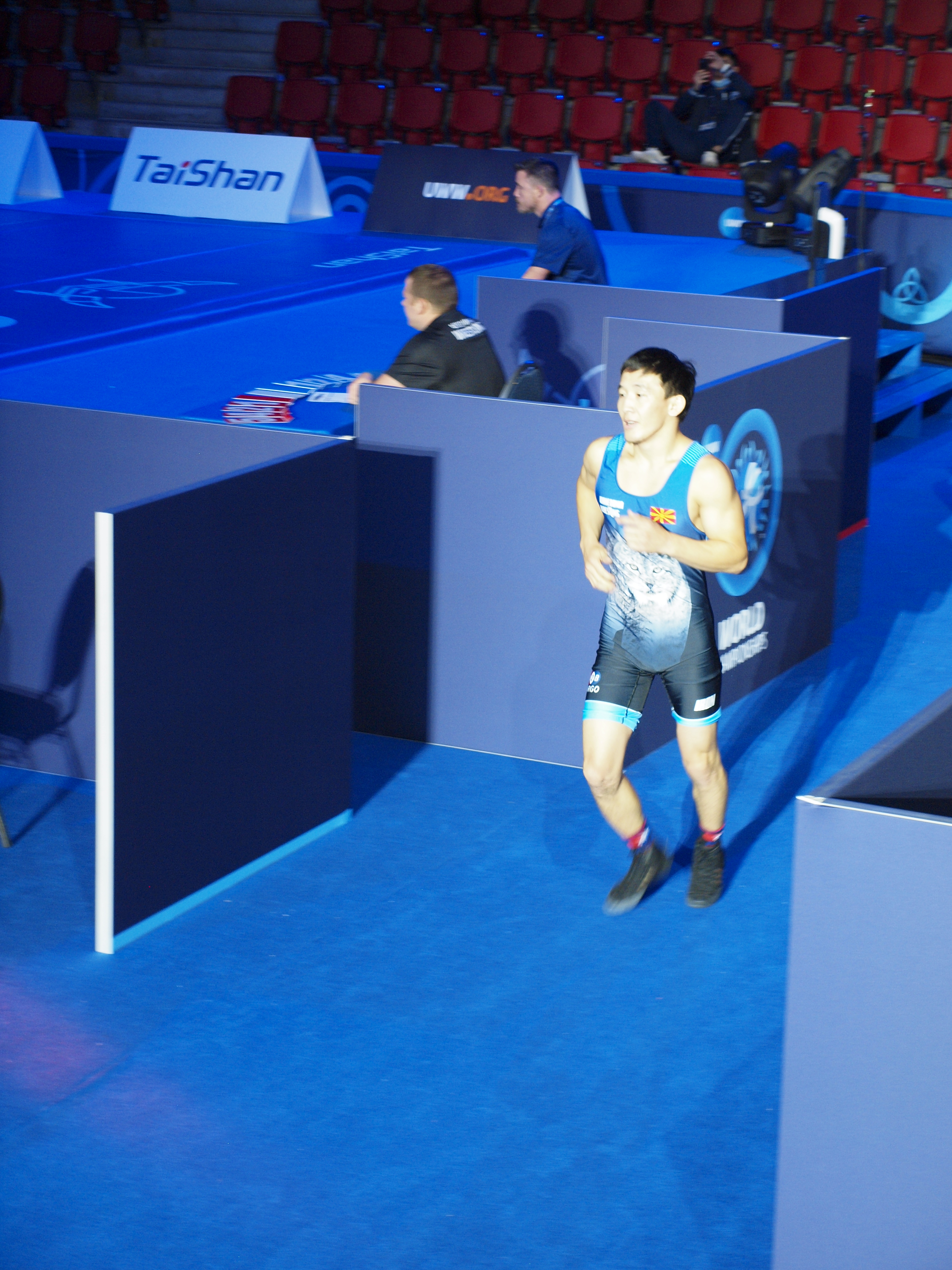
- Vladimir Egorov at the 2021 World Wrestling Championships in Oslo, Norway

Personal information
- Nationality: North Macedonia
- Born: Владимир Егоров; 27 June 1995 (age 31) Amginsky District, Sakha, Russia
- Height: 163 cm (5 ft 4 in)
- Weight: 63 kg (139 lb)

Sport
- Country: Russia; North Macedonia (since 2019)
- Sport: Amateur wrestling
- Weight class: 57 kg
- Event: Freestyle
- Club: Balkanec; Stip

Achievements and titles
- World finals: 5th (2025)
- Regional finals: (bronze) (2019) (gold) (2022)
Medal record
Men's freestyle wrestling
Representing North Macedonia
European Championships
Gold medal – first place	2022 Budapest	57 kg
Bronze medal – third place	2019 Bucharest	57 kg
Mediterranean Games
Bronze medal – third place	2022 Oran	65 kg
Dan Kolov & Nikola Petrov Tournament
Gold medal – first place	2026 Plovdiv	61 kg

Vladimir Egorov (born 27 June 1995 in Sakha) is a Russian-born Macedonian freestyle wrestler of Yakut heritage. He won the gold medal in the 57 kg event at the 2022 European Wrestling Championships held in Budapest, Hungary. He represented North Macedonia at the 2024 Summer Olympics in Paris, France.

== Career ==
Egorov won one of the bronze medals in the 57 kg event at the 2019 European Wrestling Championships held in Bucharest, Romania. He represented North Macedonia at the 2019 European Games held in Minsk, Belarus in the 57 kg event without winning a medal. In the same year, Egorov also competed in the 57 kg event at the World Wrestling Championships held in Nur-Sultan, Kazakhstan where he was eliminated in his first match by Daton Fix.

In 2020, Egorov competed in the 61 kg event at the European Wrestling Championships held in Rome, Italy. He was eliminated in his first match by Arsen Harutyunyan of Armenia. In March 2021, he competed at the European Qualification Tournament in Budapest, Hungary hoping to qualify for the 2020 Summer Olympics (which were postponed to summer 2021) in Tokyo, Japan. Egorov did not qualify at this tournament and he also failed to qualify for the Olympics at the World Olympic Qualification Tournament held in Sofia, Bulgaria.

Egorov won the gold medal in the 57 kg event at the 2022 European Wrestling Championships held in Budapest, Hungary. In the final, he defeated Aliabbas Rzazade of Azerbaijan. He won one of the bronze medals in the 65 kg event at the 2022 Mediterranean Games held in Oran, Algeria. A few months later, he competed in the 57 kg event at the 2022 World Wrestling Championships held in Belgrade, Serbia.

Egorov competed at the 2024 European Wrestling Olympic Qualification Tournament in Baku, Azerbaijan hoping to qualify for the 2024 Summer Olympics in Paris, France. He was eliminated in his third match and he did not qualify for the Olympics. Egorov also competed at the 2024 World Wrestling Olympic Qualification Tournament held in Istanbul, Turkey without qualifying for the Olympics. Egorov was able to compete at the Olympics after the quota place earned by Aryan Tsiutryn was reallocated to him. Egorov competed in the men's freestyle 57 kg event at the Olympics. He was eliminated in his first match by eventual bronze medalist Aman Sehrawat of India.

== Achievements ==
Year	Tournament	Location	Result	Event
2019	European Championships	Bucharest, Romania	3rd	Freestyle 57 kg
2022	European Championships	Budapest, Hungary	1st	Freestyle 57 kg
2022	Mediterranean Games	Oran, Algeria	3rd	Freestyle 65 kg
