= Rüdəkənar, Masally =

Rüdəkənar
- Location within Azerbaijan
- Coordinates: 38°52′15″N 48°40′59″E
- Country: Azerbaijan
- Rayon: Masally

Population
  - Total: 942
- Time zone: UTC+4 (AZT)
  - Summer (DST): UTC+5 (AZT)

Rüdəkənar (also, Rudəkənar and Rudakenar) is a village and municipality in the Masally Rayon of Azerbaijan. It has a population of 942.
