= Muslim Sadulaev =

Russian freestyle wrestler

Muslim Sadulaev Муслим Садулаев
Personal information
- Native name: Муслим Султанович Садулаев
- Full name: Muslim Sultanovich Sadulaev
- Born: 17 October 1995 (age 30) Kurchaloy, Chechnya, Russia
- Height: 155 cm (5 ft 1 in)

Sport
- Country: Russia
- Sport: Amateur wrestling
- Weight class: 57 kg
- Event: Freestyle
Medal record
Men's freestyle wrestling
Representing Russia
World Cup
| Gold medal – first place | 2019 Yakutsk | 57 kg |
European Championships
| Silver medal – second place | 2019 Bucharest | 57 kg |
Representing Chechnya
All-Russian Spartakiad
| Bronze medal – third place | 2022 Kazan | 57 kg |
Russian National Championships
| Silver medal – second place | 2019 Sochi | 57 kg |
| Bronze medal – third place | 2018 Odintsovo | 57 kg |
| Bronze medal – third place | 2020 Naro-Fominsk | 57 kg |
Golden Grand Prix Ivan Yarygin
| Gold medal – first place | 2019 Krasnoyarsk | 57 kg |

Muslim Sadulaev (born 17 October 1995) is a Russian freestyle wrestler. He won the silver medal in the 57 kg event at the 2019 European Wrestling Championships held in Bucharest, Romania.

== Career ==
He won one of the bronze medals in the 57 kg event at the 2018 Russian National Freestyle Wrestling Championships held in Odintsovo, Moscow Oblast, Russia. A year later, in 2019, he won the silver medal in this event.

At the Golden Grand Prix Ivan Yarygin 2019 held in Krasnoyarsk, Russia, he won the gold medal in the 57 kg event.

== Achievements ==
| Year | Tournament | Location | Result | Event |
|---|---|---|---|---|
| 2019 | European Championships | Bucharest, Romania | 2nd | Freestyle 57 kg |
