= Birohar =

- Village
- Location in Haryana, India Birohar (India)
- Country: India
- State: Haryana
- Region: North India
- District: Jhajjar

Area
  - Total: 22.51 km^{2} (8.69 sq mi)

Languages
  - Official: Hindi
- Time zone: UTC+5:30 (IST)
- PIN: 124106
- ISO 3166 code: IN-HR
- Vehicle registration: HR-14
- Website: haryana.gov.in

Birohar is a village located in the Matanhail tehsil of Jhajjar district in Haryana, India.

== Demographics ==
The population of Birohar was estimated to be close to 6500 persons in the 2011 Indian census.

== Notable places ==
There is ancient Baba Rughnath Temple and Baba Muldash Temple in the village.

There is also Govt college For Girls and Boys

== Incidents ==
On November 12, 1996, the wreckage of an Ilyushin II-76TD aircraft involved in the Charkhi Dadri Mid Air Collision hit the ground in the village premises.

== Nearby villages ==
- Nimli
- Khachrauli
- Maliyawas
- Kaliyawas
- Bhagwi
- Sehlanga
