= Ravinder Dahiya =

- Born: India
- Education: Kurukshetra University (BE); Indian Institute of Technology Delhi (M.Tech, 2001); Istituto Italiano di Tecnologia / University of Genoa (PhD)
- Known for: Electronic skin, flexible electronics, robotic tactile sensing
- Awards: IEEE Fellow (2020); Fellow of the Royal Society of Edinburgh (2022); IEEE Sensors Council Technical Achievement Award (2016)
- Scientific career
- Fields: Flexible electronics, electronic skin, tactile sensing, robotics
- Workplaces: Northeastern University; University of Glasgow; Istituto Italiano di Tecnologia
- Website: rsdahiya.com

Ravinder Dahiya is an Indian-born scientist, electrical engineer and roboticist who is a Professor in the Department of Electrical and Computer Engineering at Northeastern University. He is known globally for his multidisciplinary research on electronic skin, flexible and printed electronics, tactile sensing, and their applications in robotics and interactive systems, prosthetics, and wearable systems. He is widely recognized for pioneering work that bridges materials science, printed electronics, and human–machine interaction. He is a Fellow of the IEEE, a Fellow of the Royal Society of Edinburgh, and served as President of the IEEE Sensors Council (2022–2023).

== Education ==
Dahiya received his Bachelor of Engineering in electrical engineering from Kurukshetra University, his M.Tech in electrical engineering from the Indian Institute of Technology Delhi in 2001, and his doctorate in humanoid technologies from the Istituto Italiano di Tecnologia and the University of Genoa.

== Career ==
Following his doctorate, Dahiya was a Marie Curie Fellow at the Fondazione Bruno Kessler in Trento, Italy. Following this he was researcher at University of Cambridge and from there he joined the University of Glasgow as a faculty member in the James Watt School of Engineering, where he became Professor of Electronics and Nanoengineering and an Engineering and Physical Sciences Research Council (EPSRC) Research Fellow. At Glasgow, he directed the Electronics Systems Design Centre (ESDC) and led the Bendable Electronics and Sensing Technologies (BEST) research group.

Dahiya subsequently joined Northeastern University as Professor of Electrical and Computer Engineering, where he continues to lead the BEST group.

== Research ==
Dahiya's multidisciplinary research at the frontiers of materials science and electronics has catalyzed transformative advances in human-centric robotics, intelligent interactive systems, and wearable platforms. His work has evolved through addressing real-world challenges in robotics and wearable technologies. His multidisciplinary approach fosters the convergence of materials, devices, and systems, enabling innovations that directly enhance the performance, functionality, and human-centric design of next-generation robotics and interactive platforms.

=== Electronic skin ===
Dahiya's research centres on tactile skin or electronic skin (e-skin), using advanced sensors and adaptive electronic hardware to mimic the human sense of touch. In 2017, his group at Glasgow demonstrated a graphene-based solar-powered electronic skin for prosthetic hands, a development covered by Reuters. His group also developed a solar-powered e-skin that uses an array of miniaturised solar cells for both energy generation and touch sensing, eliminating the need for dedicated touch sensors.

In 2022, his group published work demonstrating a printed neuromorphic e-skin with synaptic transistors that enabled a robotic hand to sense stimuli and process tactile data locally, analogous to the human peripheral nervous system. The work was covered by Scientific American, the University of Glasgow, and The Tribune.

=== Flexible and printed electronics ===
Dahiya's group works on fabricating electronic devices on unconventional substrates such as plastics and paper using printing and transfer techniques. His research has addressed high-performance printed transistors on biodegradable substrates for transient electronics, contact-transfer printing methods, and energy harvesting devices on textiles and plant surfaces. He has also investigated the environmental implications of transient electronics, finding that some biodegradable devices break down into harmful microplastics rather than fully dissolving. His foundational work in this field also triggered new research directions focussing on the beneficial materials and circular electronics.

=== Robotics and AI ===
Dahiya co-authored "A roadmap for AI in robotics". His broader work spans soft robotics, haptics, and intelligent interactive systems, with applications in prosthetics, wearable health monitoring, autonomous underwater vehicles and environment and agriculture monitoring. His research on large-area tactile sensing skin for robotics has been recognised through his elevation to IEEE Fellow.

== Professional service ==
Dahiya is serving on the Board of Directors of IEEE, as Director of Division X, which comprises nine societies and councils of IEEE. He served as President of the IEEE Sensors Council (2022–2023). During his presidency, IEEE Sensors Council expanded considerably its activities across its major areas of operation, including journals, conferences, education and innovation. He is the editor-in-Chief of npj Flexible Electronics (Nature Portfolio). He was the founding editor-in-chief of the IEEE Journal on Flexible Electronics from 2022 to 2023. He has served as a Distinguished Lecturer of the IEEE Sensors Council for two terms during 2016-2021 and on the editorial boards of IEEE Sensors Journal and IEEE Transactions on Robotics. In 2015, he founded IEEE Sensors Council chapter of the IEEE UK and Ireland (UKRI) section and served as its founding chair from 2015 to 2017. In 2018, he founded IEEE International Conference on Flexible, Printed Sensors and Systems (FLEPS). In 2024, he founded the IEEE Sensors Council Technical Committee on Flexible Printed Sensors and Systems (TC-FLEPS).

== Selected publications ==
- Dahiya, Ravinder S.; Valle, Maurizio (2013). Robotic Tactile Sensing: Technologies and System. Springer. ISBN 978-94-007-0578-4.
- Dahiya, Ravinder S.; Metta, Giorgio; Valle, Maurizio; Sandini, Giulio (2010). "Tactile Sensing—From Humans to Humanoids". IEEE Transactions on Robotics. 26 (1): 1–20. doi:10.1109/TRO.2009.2033627.
- Dahiya, Ravinder S. (2019). "Large Area Soft eSkin: The Challenges Beyond Sensor Designs". Proceedings of the IEEE. 107 (10): 2016–2033. doi:10.1109/JPROC.2019.2941366.
- Dahiya, Ravinder S.; Mittendorfer, Philipp; Valle, Maurizio; Cheng, Gordon; Lumelsky, Vladimir J. (2013). "Directions Toward Effective Utilization of Tactile Skin: A Review". IEEE Sensors Journal. 13 (11): 4121–4138. doi:10.1109/JSEN.2013.2279056.

== Honours and awards ==
- IEEE Fellow (2020), "for contributions to tactile sensing"
- Fellow of the Royal Society of Edinburgh (elected 2022)
- Marie Curie Fellowship
- IEEE Sensors Council Technical Achievement Award (2016)
- Microelectronic Engineering Young Investigator Award (2016, Elsevier)
