= Rüdəkənar, Astara =

Village and municipality of Azerbaijan

Rüdəkənar is a village and municipality in the Astara Rayon of Azerbaijan. It has a population of 1,479.
