= Aliabbas Rzazade =

Azerbaijani freestyle wrestler

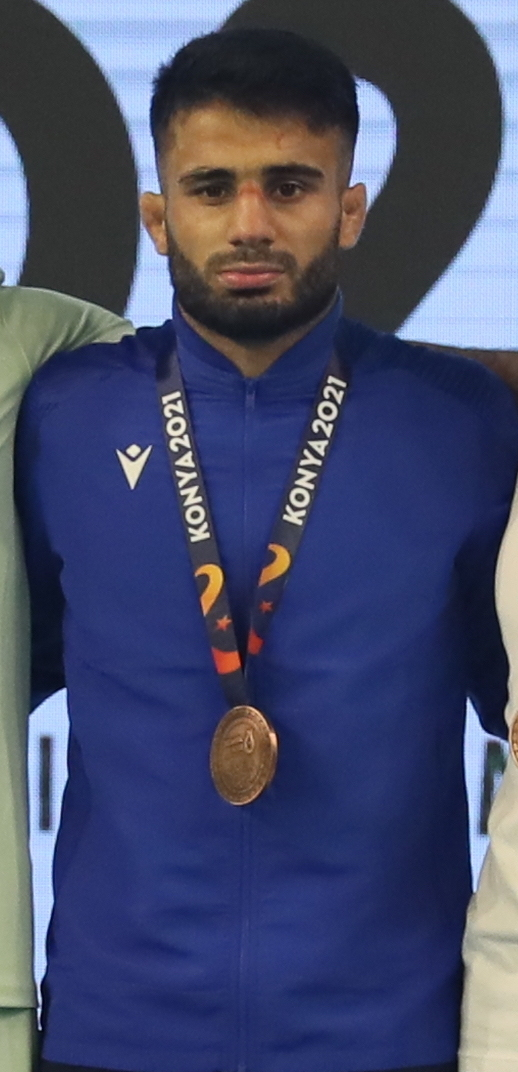
- Rzazade at the 2021 Islamic Solidarity Games

Personal information
- Native name: Əliabbas Rzazadə
- Nationality: Azerbaijan
- Born: 21 May 1998 (age 28) Astara, Azerbaijan
- Height: 165 cm (5 ft 5 in)

Sport
- Country: Azerbaijan
- Sport: Amateur wrestling
- Weight class: 57 kg
- Event: Freestyle
Medal record
Men's freestyle wrestling
Representing Azerbaijan
European Championships
Gold medal – first place	2023 Zagreb	57 kg
Silver medal – second place	2022 Budapest	57 kg
Islamic Solidarity Games
Bronze medal – third place	2021 Konya	57 kg
Grand Prix
Gold medal – first place	2022 Rome	57 kg
Gold medal – first place	2023 Zagreb	57 kg
Bronze medal – third place	2024 Zagreb	61 kg
Poland Open (Wacław Ziółkowski Memorial)
Bronze medal – third place	2023 Warsaw	61 kg
World U23 Championships
Gold medal – first place	2021 Belgrade	57 kg
European U23 Championship
Silver medal – second place	2021 Skopje	57 kg
World Juniors Championships
Bronze medal – third place	2016 Macon	50 kg
European Juniors Championships
Bronze medal – third place	2016 Bucharest	50 kg
Bronze medal – third place	2018 Rome	57 kg

Aliabbas Rzazade (Azerbaijani: Əliabbas Rzazadə; born 21 May 1998) is an Azerbaijani freestyle wrestler competing in the 57 kg division. He won the gold medal in the 57 kg event at the 2023 European Wrestling Championships held in Zagreb, Croatia.

== Early life ==
Aliabbas Rzazadeh was born on May 21, 1998, in the village of Rudekanar, Astara district.

== Career ==
In 2021, he won the silver medal in the men's 57 kg event at the 2021 European U23 Wrestling Championship held in Skopje, North Macedonia.

Aliabbas Rzazade won the gold medal in the men's freestyle 57 kg at the 2021 U23 World Wrestling Championships held in Belgrade, Serbia.

In 2022, Rzazade won the gold medal in his event at the Matteo Pellicone Ranking Series 2022 held in Rome, Italy. He won one of the bronze medals in the men's 57 kg event at the 2021 Islamic Solidarity Games held in Konya, Turkey. He competed in the 57 kg event at the 2022 World Wrestling Championships held in Belgrade, Serbia.

Rzazade won the silver medal in the 57 kg event at the 2022 European Wrestling Championships held in Budapest, Hungary. Rzazadeh won his first European title in his career by defeating his opponent with a score of 12: 2 in the final match of the 2023 European Championship held in Zagreb, the capital of Croatia.

Rzazade competed at the 2024 European Wrestling Olympic Qualification Tournament in Baku, Azerbaijan and he earned a quota place for Azerbaijan for the 2024 Summer Olympics in Paris, France. He competed in the men's freestyle 57 kg event at the Olympics. He was eliminated in his first match by eventual bronze medalist Gulomjon Abdullaev of Uzbekistan.

== Achievements ==
Year	Tournament	Location	Result	Event
2022	European Championships	Budapest, Hungary	2nd	Freestyle 57 kg
2022	Islamic Solidarity Games	Konya, Turkey	3rd	Freestyle 57 kg
2023	European Championships	Zagreb, Croatia	1st	Freestyle 57 kg
