= Toshihiro Hasegawa =

Japanese freestyle wrestler

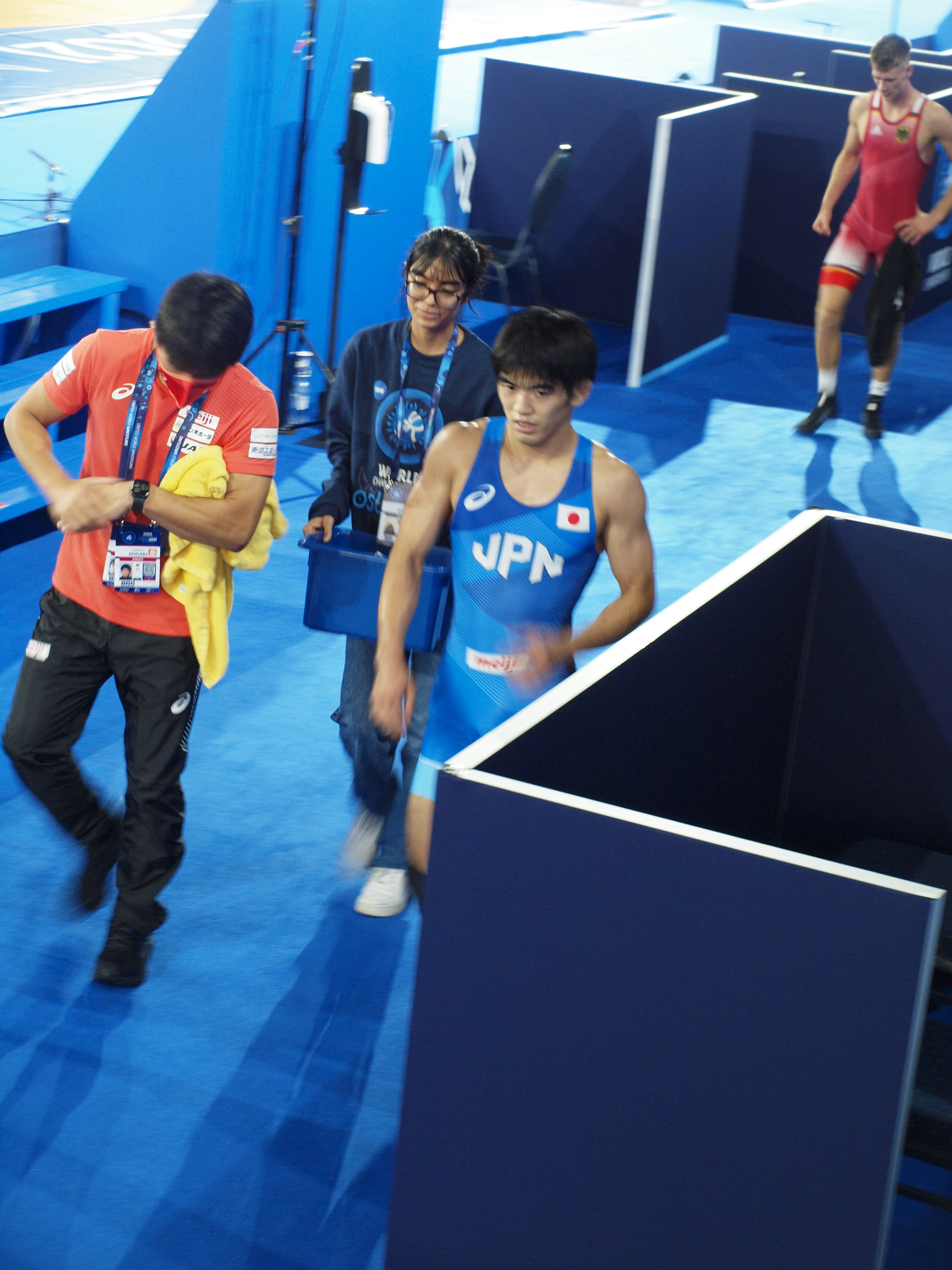
- Toshihiro Hasegawa at the 2021 World Wrestling Championships in Oslo, Norway

Personal information
- Native name: 長谷川 敏裕
- Nationality: Japan
- Born: 24 August 1996 (age 30) Tokyo, Japan
- Height: 167 cm (5 ft 6 in)

Sport
- Country: Japan
- Sport: Amateur wrestling
- Weight class: 61 kg
- Event: Freestyle

Achievements and titles
- World finals: (bronze) (2021)
- Regional finals: (gold) (2023)
Medal record
Men's freestyle wrestling
Representing Japan
World Championships
Bronze medal – third place	2021 Oslo	61 kg
Asian Games
Gold medal – first place	2022 Hangzhou	57 kg
Asian Championships
Bronze medal – third place	2018 Bishkek	57 kg
World U23 Championships
Gold medal – first place	2018 Bucharest	57 kg
World Cadets Championships
Bronze medal – third place	2013 Zrenjanin	50 kg

Toshihiro Hasegawa (born 24 August 1996) is a Japanese freestyle wrestler. He won one of the bronze medals in the men's 61 kg event at the 2021 World Wrestling Championships held in Oslo, Norway. He won the gold medal in the men's 57 kg event at the 2022 Asian Games held Hangzhou, China.

In 2018, Hasegawa won one of the bronze medals in the men's 57 kg event at the Asian Wrestling Championships held in Bishkek, Kyrgyzstan. In that same year, he also won the gold medal in the men's 57 kg event at the 2018 U23 World Wrestling Championships held in Bucharest, Romania.
