= Zou Wanhao =

Chinese freestyle wrestler

Personal information
- Native name: 邹万豪
- Nationality: China
- Born: 29 March 1998 (age 28) Babu District, Hezhou, Guangxi, China
- Education: Jianghan University
- Height: 162 cm (5 ft 4 in)
- Weight: 57 kg (126 lb)

Sport
- Country: China
- Sport: Amateur wrestling
- Weight class: 57 kg
- Event: Freestyle
Medal record
Men's freestyle wrestling
Representing China
Asian Games
Bronze medal – third place	2026 Aichi–Nagoya	57 kg
Asian Championships
Bronze medal – third place	2025 Amman	61 kg
Grand Prix
Silver medal – second place	2024 Zagreb	57 kg
Gold medal – first place	2023 Budapest	57 kg
Bronze medal – third place	2023 Bishkek	57 kg
World U23 Championships
Bronze medal – third place	2018 Bucharest	57 kg
National Games of China
Silver medal – second place	2021 Shaanxi	57 kg

Zou Wanhao (born 29 March 1998) is a Chinese Freestyle wrestler. He won a bronze medal in the 57 kg event at the 2018 U23 World Wrestling Championships.

== Background ==
Zou is a native of Babu District, Hezhou, Guangxi.

He was selected to Guangxi Sports School in 2007. In 2013 he entered the Guangxi provincial team and in 2017 entered the national team of China.

== Career ==
In November 2018, Zou participated in the 2018 U23 World Wrestling Championships and won a bronze medal in the 57 kg event.

In September 2022, Zou participated in 57 kg event of the 2022 World Wrestling Championships. He came fifth after losing the bronze medal bout to Zandanbudyn Zanabazar.

In May 2024, Zou competed at the 2024 World Wrestling Olympic Qualification Tournament and won the wrestle-off against Andriy Yatsenko to qualify for the 2024 Summer Olympics. He competed in the men's freestyle 57 kg event at the Olympics.
