= Darian Cruz =

Stateside Puerto Rican freestyle wrestler (born 1995)

Personal information
- Full name: Darian Toi Cruz
- Born: February 7, 1995 (age 31) Allentown, Pennsylvania, U.S.

Sport
- Country: United States (2018–2021); Puerto Rico (2022–present)
- Sport: Wrestling
- Weight class: 57 kg (126 lb)
- Events: Freestyle and Folkstyle
- College team: Lehigh
- Club: Lehigh Valley Wrestling Club
- Coached by: Pat Santoro
Medal record
Men's freestyle wrestling
Representing Puerto Rico
Pan American Games
Bronze medal – third place	2023 Santiago	57 kg
Central American and Caribbean Games
Silver medal – second place	2026 Santo Domingo	57 kg
Pan American Championships
Silver medal – second place	2022 Acapulco	57 kg
Silver medal – second place	2023 Buenos Aires	57 kg
Silver medal – second place	2026 Coralville	57 kg
Grand Prix
Silver medal – second place	2022 Madrid	57 kg
Silver medal – second place	2023 Warsaw	57 kg
Representing the United States
Pan American Championships
Bronze medal – third place	2020 Ottawa	57 kg
Grand Prix
Gold medal – first place	2018 Guelph	57 kg
Bronze medal – third place	2019 Colorado Springs	57 kg
Men's collegiate wrestling
Representing the Lehigh Mountain Hawks
NCAA Division I Championships
Gold medal – first place	2017 St. Louis	125 lb
EIWA Championships
Gold medal – first place	2016 Princeton	125 lb
Gold medal – first place	2017 Lewisburg	125 lb
Gold medal – first place	2018 Uniondale	125 lb
Bronze medal – third place	2014 Bethlehem	125 lb

Darian Toi Cruz (born February 7, 1995) is a stateside Puerto Rican freestyle wrestler who competes internationally at 57 kilograms. He represented Puerto Rico at the 2024 Summer Olympics, and is a Pan American Games medalist, as well as a three-time Pan American medalist. Cruz was the 2017 NCAA Division I national champion out of Lehigh University.
