= Bekzat Almaz Uulu =

Kyrgyzstani sport wrestler (born 2000)

Personal information
- Nationality: Kyrgyz
- Born: 3 December 2000 (age 25) Kyrgyzstan, Talas, Aitmatov r-n, village Amanbaevo(former name Groznoye

Sport
- Country: Kyrgyzstan
- Sport: Freestyle Wrestling
- Weight class: 57 kg
- Event: Freestyle
- Coached by: First coach Zholumbetov Anarbek
Medal record
Men's freestyle wrestling
Representing Kyrgyzstan
World Championships
Silver medal – second place	2025 Zagreb	57 kg
Yasar Dogu Tournament
Gold medal – first place	2024 Antalya	57 kg
Grand Prix
Silver medal – second place	2023 Bishkek	57 kg
Bronze medal – third place	2023 Alexandria	57 kg
Bronze medal – third place	2025 Budapest	61 kg
U23 World Championships
Bronze medal – third place	2023 Tirana	57 kg
Bronze medal – third place	2022 Pontevedra	57 kg
U23 Asian Championships
Gold medal – first place	2023 Bishkek	57 kg
Silver medal – second place	2022 Bishkek	57 kg

Bekzat Almaz Uulu (born 3 December 2000) is a Kyrgyzstani freestyle wrestler who competes at 57 kilograms. A two-time U23 World medalist and U23 Asian champion, Uulu represented Kyrgyzstan at the 2024 Summer Olympics after reaching the finals of the 2024 Asian Olympic Qualification Tournament. He competed in the men's freestyle 57 kg event at the Olympics.
