= Joseph McKenna (wrestler) =

American freestyle wrestler

Joey McKenna
Personal information
- Full name: Joseph Christopher McKenna
- Born: August 3, 1995 (age 30) Ridgewood, New Jersey, U.S.
- Height: 5 ft 5 in (1.65 m)

Sport
- Country: United States
- Sport: Wrestling
- Weight class: 65 kg (143 lb)
- Events: Freestyle and folkstyle
- College team: Ohio State; Stanford
- Club: Cowboy RTC; Titan Mercury Wrestling Club; Pennsylvania RTC (formerly)
- Coached by: David Taylor; Brandon Slay (formerly)
Medal record
Men's freestyle wrestling
Representing the United States
Pan American Championships
Gold medal – first place	2021 Guatemala City	65 kg
Gold medal – first place	2022 Acapulco	65 kg
Silver medal – second place	2025 Monterrey	65 kg
Grand Prix
Silver medal – second place	2023 Budapest	70 kg
Silver medal – second place	2023 Alexandria	65 kg
Silver medal – second place	2023 Zagreb	65 kg
Bronze medal – third place	2021 Warsaw	65 kg
Bronze medal – third place	2022 Warsaw	65 kg
Bronze medal – third place	2023 Sofia	65 kg
Bronze medal – third place	2025 Taraz City	65 kg
Bronze medal – third place	2026 Zagreb	65 kg
Bronze medal – third place	2026 Tirana	65 kg
World U23 Championships
Bronze medal – third place	2017 Bydgoszcz	65 kg
World U20 Championships
Bronze medal – third place	2014 Zagreb	60 kg
Men's collegiate wrestling
Representing the Ohio State Buckeyes
NCAA Division I Championships
Silver medal – second place	2019 Pittsburgh	141 lb
Bronze medal – third place	2018 Cleveland	141 lb
Big Ten Championships
Gold medal – first place	2018 East Lansing	141 lb
Gold medal – first place	2019 Minneapolis	141 lb
Representing the Stanford Cardinal
NCAA Division I Championships
Bronze medal – third place	2016 New York	141 lb
Pac-12 Championships
Gold medal – first place	2016 Tempe	141 lb
Gold medal – first place	2017 Stanford	141 lb

Joseph Christopher McKenna (born August 3, 1995) is an American freestyle and graduated folkstyle wrestler who competes at 65 kilograms. In freestyle, he is a two-time Pan American Continental champion, multiple-time Grand Prix medalist, and a U23 World medalist and US National champion.

As a folkstyle wrestler, he was a three-time NCAA Division I All-American, twice out of Ohio State University and once out of Stanford University.

== Folkstyle career ==
=== High school ===
Born in Ridgewood, New Jersey, and raised in the Towaco section of Montville, McKenna attended Blair Academy, noted for its wrestling program, in his native New Jersey. During his time as a high schooler, he went on to rack up three Prep National titles while claiming multiple titles from tournaments such as the Beast of the East and Ironman. McKenna was the team captain during his last two years. He also competed at Who's Number One in 2013, falling to eventual Penn State great Jason Nolf. Going into his junior year (November 2013), McKenna committed to the Stanford Cardinal.

=== College ===
==== Stanford University ====
After redshirting during the 2014–15 season, McKenna was 19–2 during his freshman year during regular season, with top–ranked Dean Heil being the only to beat him during this period of time. The second–ranked wrestler in the country, McKenna claimed the Pac-12 Conference title and placed third at the NCAAs, only losing to Bryce Meredith in the latter and bouncing back to beat Anthony Ashnault in his last match of the season. After the season, McKenna was named the Pac-12 Freshman of the Year.

As a sophomore (2016–17), McKenna posted a 26–1 record during regular season, and after claiming his second straight conference title, he was upset and failed to place at the NCAAs.

==== Ohio State University ====
After the previous season, McKenna transferred from the Stanford University to Ohio State University. During his first season as a Buckeye (2016–17), he went 12–1 during regular season, claimed the Big Ten Conference title and placed third at the NCAAs, notably defeating MAC Conference champion from Missouri Jaydin Eierman in the third–place match. In his senior year, McKenna had yet another successful regular season, claiming the Cliff Keen title and racking up a 16–2 record, before claiming his second straight B1G title and placing as the runner–up at the NCAA tournament, in his best season during college. Overall, McKenna racked up a 105–11 record in two seasons for the Buckeyes and two seasons for the Cardinal.

== Freestyle career ==
=== 2014–2016 ===
After a second–place finish at the Junior World Championships, McKenna made his senior freestyle debut in November 2014 at the age of 19, placing fourth at the Bill Farrell Memorial International. Afterwards, he placed third at the Brazil Cup, notably defeating future U23 World Champion from Russia Nachyn Kuular in the first round. McKenna competed in multiple tournaments throughout 2015, but only placed at the 2015 Granma y Cerro Pelado, claiming the gold medal. In 2016, he only competed at the Polish Open, placing third.

=== 2017–2019 ===
After placing third at the 2017 Ion Cornianu & Ladislau Simon tournament in Romania, he made the US U23 World Team and went on to claim a bronze medal from the U23 World Championships. In 2018, he started off by claiming the US Open National Championship, defeating Jaydin Eierman after tech'ing his way to the finals. Due to his last result, McKenna sat out in the finals of the US World Team Trials, in where he was defeated twice in a row by '16 World Champion (61kg) and four–time NCAA champion for the Buckeyes Logan Stieber. To finish the year, he was defeated by three–time World Champion (61kg) from Azerbaijan Haji Aliyev at the Alexandr Medved Memorial International. In 2019, McKenna failed to qualify for the US World Team Trials, but qualified for the 2020 US Olympic Team Trials after a second–place finish at the US Senior Nationals.

=== 2020–2021 ===
McKenna opened up the year with a seventh–place finish at the Matteo Pellicone and a ninth–place finish Golden Grand Prix Ivan Yarygin. He was then scheduled to compete at the US Olympic Team Trials, however, the event was postponed as well as the 2020 Summer Olympics due to the COVID-19 pandemic. After months of being unable to compete due to the pandemic, McKenna placed third at the US National Championships, going 7–1. To open up 2021, McKenna competed in back–to–back FloWrestling events, dominating NCAA champions Nahshon Garrett and Seth Gross. McKenna went back to competing overseas, first competing at the Ukraine Open, where he notably defeated '20 European Continental finalist from Belarus Niurgun Skriabin before falling to reigning U23 World Champion from Azerbaijan Turan Bayramov, failing to place. Next, he competed at the Matteo Pellicone Ranking Series, placing third.

McKenna then competed at the rescheduled US Olympic Team Trials in April 2–3, as the fifth seed, in an attempt of representing the United States at the 2020 Summer Olympics. McKenna performed outstandingly on his way to the finals, upseting fourth–seeded and '17 World Championship runner–up (70kg) James Green and top–seeded and defending US World Team Member Zain Retherford. In the best–of–three finale, he was defeated by '19 US National champion Jordan Oliver twice in a row, earning hard–fought runner–up honors.

As the other US Olympic Trials finalist, McKenna competed at the Pan American Continental Championships from May 27 to 30, replacing an injured Jordan Oliver. He captured the crown after tech'ing all of his four opponents, most notably four–time All–American for Rutgers and representative of Puerto Rico Sebastian Rivera, helping the USA reach all ten medals in freestyle. In a quick turnaround, McKenna competed at the prestigioys Poland Open on June 9. After a victory over a Ukrainian opponent, McKenna suffered back–to–back losses that came in hand of the highly accomplished Vasyl Shuptar and Yianni Diakomihalis, before earning a forfeit win over Shuptar to claim the bronze.

McKenna competed at the 2021 US World Team Trials on September 11–12, intending to represent the country at the World Championships. After a back-and-forth win over Evan Henderson to make the finals, McKenna beat rival Yianni Diakomihalis in another slugfest, before being downed twice convincingly, losing the series.

=== 2022 ===
To start off the year, McKenna placed fifth at the Golden Grand Prix Ivan Yarygin, notably downing two-time World medalist Akhmed Chakaev. He then beat Kamal Begakov on February 12, at Bout at the Ballpark. McKenna competed at the Yasar Dogu International on February 27, claiming a bronze medal after going 4–1, only losing to World Champion Zagir Shakhiev in a close bout.

On May 8, McKenna defended his Pan American championship in Acapulco, Mexico, defeating Olympian Agustín Destribats and four-time All-American Sebastian Rivera in order to do so.

At the US World Team Trials, in May, McKenna suffered a first-round upset to Ian Parker, loss which he avenged in the bronze-medal bout to place third. He then placed third at the Poland Open and second at the D.A. Kunaev International, in July and November, respectively.

=== 2023 ===
To start off the year, McKenna racked up silver medals at the Grand Prix Zagreb Open and the Ibrahim Moustafa Ranking Series, as well as a bronze at the Dan Kolov & Nikola Petrov Tournament. In these tournaments, he earned notable wins over eventual 2023 World silver medalist Sebastian Rivera, U20 World Champion Erik Arushanian and European medalist Ali Rahimzade.

In April, McKenna placed second at the US Open, falling to two-time NCAA champion Nick Lee in the finals and failing to advance in the US World Team Trials process. In June, he beat Matthew Kolodzik in the true-third bout at Final X Neward.

At the Polyák Imre & Varga János Memorial, in July, McKenna earned silver up at 70 kilograms after a notable win over eventual 2023 World silver medalist Amir Mohammad Yazdani in the semifinals. In November, McKenna became the champion at the D.A. Kunaev International, earning an important victory over fellow American and World silver medalist Yianni Diakomihalis in the semifinals.

McKenna wrestled at the US Senior Nationals on December 16, placing third and qualifying for the US Olympic Team Trials.

=== 2024 ===
In January, McKenna claimed a bronze medal from the Grand Prix Zagreb Open, soundly defeating returning World finalist Sebastian Rivera.

== Freestyle record ==
Senior Freestyle Matches
Res.	Record	Opponent	Score	Date	Event	Location
2026 US Open (silver) at 65 kg
Loss	142–57	(United States) Bo Bassett	TF 0–10	April 24–25, 2026	2026 US Open National Championships	(United States) Las Vegas, Nevada
Win	142–56	(United States) Jesse Mendez	3–2	April 24–25, 2026	2026 US Open National Championships	(United States) Las Vegas, Nevada
Win	141–56	(United States) Pierson Manville	8–5	April 24–25, 2026	2026 US Open National Championships	(United States) Las Vegas, Nevada
Win	140–56	(United States) Julian Farber	TF 10-1	April 24–25, 2026	2026 US Open National Championships	(United States) Las Vegas, Nevada
2026 Muhamet Malo Ranking Series (bronze) at 65 kg
Win	139-56	(Georgia (country)) Nika Zakashvili	7-0	February 26, 2026	2026 Muhamet Malo Tournament	Tirana, Albania
Loss	138-56	(India) Sujeet Kalkal	TF 0-11	February 26, 2026	2026 Muhamet Malo Tournament	Tirana, Albania
Win	138-55	(Uzbekistan) Umidjon Jalolov	3-0	February 26, 2026	2026 Muhamet Malo Tournament	Tirana, Albania
Win	137-55	(Hungary) Gamzatgadzsi Halidov	7-2	February 26, 2026	2026 Muhamet Malo Tournament	Tirana, Albania
Win	136-55	(India) Mohit Kumar	TF 10-0	February 26, 2026	2026 Muhamet Malo Tournament	Tirana, Albania
2026 Grand Prix Zagreb Open (bronze) at 65 kg
Win	135-55	(France) Khamzat Arsamerzouev	4-1	February 4, 2026	2026 Grand Prix Zagreb Open	Zagreb, Croatia
Loss	134-55	(India) Sujeet Kalkal	TF 0-11	February 4, 2026	2026 Grand Prix Zagreb Open	Zagreb, Croatia
Win	134-54	(Japan) Takara Suda	7-0	February 4, 2026	2026 Grand Prix Zagreb Open	Zagreb, Croatia
Win	133–54	(France) Mathis Lelong	TF 11-0	November 29, 2025	Cowboy RTC vs France	(United States) Durant, Oklahoma
2025 US World Team Trials (silver) at 65 kg
Loss	132–54	(United States) Real Woods	4–5	June 14, 2025	2025 Final X	(United States) Newark, New Jersey
Loss	132–53	(United States) Real Woods	3–7	June 14, 2025	2025 Final X	(United States) Newark, New Jersey
2025 Pan American Championships (silver) at 65 kg
Loss	132-52	(Argentina) Agustin Destribats	4-5	May 11, 2025	2025 Pan American Championships	Monterrey, Mexico
Win	132-51	(Brazil) Matheus Barreto	TF 12-1	May 11, 2025	2025 Pan American Championships	Monterrey, Mexico
Win	131-51	(Canada) Peiman Biabani	TF 11-0	May 11, 2025	2025 Pan American Championships	Monterrey, Mexico
2025 US Open (gold) at 65 kg
Win	130-51	(United States) Jesse Mendez	3-2	April 25–26, 2025	2025 US Open National Championships	(United States) Las Vegas, Nevada
Win	129-51	(United States) Aden Valencia	9-6	April 25–26, 2025	2025 US Open National Championships	(United States) Las Vegas, Nevada
Win	128-51	(United States) Tom Crook	TF 10-0	April 25–26, 2025	2025 US Open National Championships	(United States) Las Vegas, Nevada
Win	127-51	(United States) Ruben Calderon	TF 13-2	April 25–26, 2025	2025 US Open National Championships	(United States) Las Vegas, Nevada
2025 Grand Prix Zagreb Open (silver) at 65 kg
Loss	126-51	(Iran) Abbas Ebrahimzadeh	6-7	February 5, 2024	2025 Grand Prix Zagreb Open	Zagreb, Croatia
Win	126-50	(Georgia (country)) Goga Otinashvili	3-1	February 5, 2024	2025 Grand Prix Zagreb Open	Zagreb, Croatia
Win	125-50	(Azerbaijan) Ali Rahimzade	7-4	February 5, 2024	2025 Grand Prix Zagreb Open	Zagreb, Croatia
2024 D.A. Kunaev International (bronze) at 65 kg
Win	124-50	(Kazakhstan) Beknur Sattibay	TF 10–0	December 20, 2024	2024 D.A. Kunaev International	Taraz, Kazakhstan
Loss	123-50	(Kazakhstan) Adlan Askarov	4-8	December 20, 2024	2024 D.A. Kunaev International	Taraz, Kazakhstan
Win	123-49	(Kazakhstan) Bekzat Ermekbay	TF 10-0	December 20, 2024	2024 D.A. Kunaev International	Taraz, Kazakhstan
Win	122-49	(Kyrgyzstan) Ulukbek Zholdoshbekov	TF 11-1	December 20, 2024	2024 D.A. Kunaev International	Taraz, Kazakhstan
2024 US Olympic Trials (bronze) 65 kg
Win	121-49	(United States) Jesse Mendez	4-4	April 19–20, 2024	2024 US Olympic Trials	(United States) State College, Pennsylvania
Win		(United States) Yianni Diakomihalis	FF	April 19–20, 2024	2024 US Olympic Trials	(United States) State College, Pennsylvania
Win	120-49	(United States) Matthew Kolodzik	TF 12-2	April 19–20, 2024	2024 US Olympic Trials	(United States) State College, Pennsylvania
Win	119-49	(United States) Beau Bartlett	3-2	April 19–20, 2024	2024 US Olympic Trials	(United States) State College, Pennsylvania
Loss	118-49	(United States) Jesse Mendez	2-8	April 19–20, 2024	2024 US Olympic Trials	(United States) State College, Pennsylvania
2024 Grand Prix Zagreb Open (bronze) at 65 kg
Win	118–48	(Puerto Rico) Sebastian Rivera	TF 10–0	January 10, 2024	2024 Grand Prix Zagreb Open	Zagreb, Croatia
Win	117–48	(France) Khamzat Arsamerzouev	3–3	January 10, 2024	2024 Grand Prix Zagreb Open	Zagreb, Croatia
Loss	116–48	(Armenia) Vazgen Tevanyan	2–5	January 10, 2024	2024 Grand Prix Zagreb Open	Zagreb, Croatia
Win	116–47	(Azerbaijan) Ziraddin Bayramov	TF 11–0	January 10, 2024	2024 Grand Prix Zagreb Open	Zagreb, Croatia
2023 US Nationals (bronze) at 65 kg
Win	115–47	(United States) Seth Gross	5–2	December 16–17, 2023	2023 US Senior National Championships	(United States) Fort Worth, Texas
Win	114–47	(United States) Austin DeSanto	9–5	December 16–17, 2023	2023 US Senior National Championships	(United States) Fort Worth, Texas
Loss	113–47	(United States) Beau Bartlett	5–5	December 16–17, 2023	2023 US Senior National Championships	(United States) Fort Worth, Texas
Win	113–46	(United States) Jaydin Eierman	10–8	December 16–17, 2023	2023 US Senior National Championships	(United States) Fort Worth, Texas
Win	112–46	(United States) Michael McGee	TF 10–0	December 16–17, 2023	2023 US Senior National Championships	(United States) Fort Worth, Texas
2023 D.A. Kunaev International (gold) at 65 kg
Win	111–46	(Kazakhstan) Adil Ospanov	9–4	November 3–4, 2023	2023 D.A. Kunaev International	Taraz, Kazakhstan
Win	110–46	(United States) Yianni Diakomihalis	4–3	November 3–4, 2023	2023 D.A. Kunaev International	Taraz, Kazakhstan
Win	109–46	(Kazakhstan) Shattyk Alaidar	Fall	November 3–4, 2023	2023 D.A. Kunaev International	Taraz, Kazakhstan
Win	108–46	(Uzbekistan) Khusniddin Erkabaev	5–0	November 3–4, 2023	2023 D.A. Kunaev International	Taraz, Kazakhstan
Win	107–46	(Kazakhstan) Rustem Tolen	TF 11–0	November 3–4, 2023	2023 D.A. Kunaev International	Taraz, Kazakhstan
2023 Polyák Imre & Varga János Memorial (silver) at 70 kg
Loss	106–46	(Ukraine) Ihor Nykyforuk	2–4	July 13, 2023	2023 Polyák Imre & Varga János Memorial Tournament	Budapest, Hungary
Win	106–45	(Iran) Amir Mohammad Yazdani	9–8	July 13, 2023	2023 Polyák Imre & Varga János Memorial Tournament	Budapest, Hungary
Win	105–45	(Kazakhstan) Syrbaz Talgat	10–6	July 13, 2023	2023 Polyák Imre & Varga János Memorial Tournament	Budapest, Hungary
Win	104–45	(Kazakhstan) Sanzhar Doszhanov	8–4	July 13, 2023	2023 Polyák Imre & Varga János Memorial Tournament	Budapest, Hungary
2023 US World Team Trials (bronze) at 65 kg
Win	103–45	(United States) Matthew Kolodzik	TF 10–0	June 10, 2023	2023 Final X Newark: True Third	(United States) Newark, New Jersey
2023 US Open (silver) at 65 kg
Loss	102–45	(United States) Nick Lee	5–10	April 26–30, 2023	2023 US Open National Championships	(United States) Las Vegas, Nevada
Win	102–44	(United States) Ridge Lovett	8–3	April 26–30, 2023	2023 US Open National Championships	(United States) Las Vegas, Nevada
Win	101–44	(United States) Anthony Ashnault	TF 10-0	April 26–30, 2023	2023 US Open National Championships	(United States) Las Vegas, Nevada
Win	100–44	(United States) Hunter Pfantz	TF 10–0	April 26–30, 2023	2023 US Open National Championships	(United States) Las Vegas, Nevada
Win	99–44	(United States) Josh Koderhandt	TF 10–0	April 26–30, 2023	2023 US Open National Championships	(United States) Las Vegas, Nevada
2023 Dan Kolov & Nikola Petrov (bronze) at 65 kg
Win	98–44	(Romania) Stefan Coman	6–2	March 3–4, 2023	2023 Dan Kolov & Nikola Petrov Tournament	Sofia, Bulgaria
Loss	97–44	(Albania) Islam Dudaev	3–10	March 3–4, 2023	2023 Dan Kolov & Nikola Petrov Tournament	Sofia, Bulgaria
Win	97–43	(Kazakhstan) Bek Zhaqsybekov	7–0	March 3–4, 2023	2023 Dan Kolov & Nikola Petrov Tournament	Sofia, Bulgaria
Win	96–43	(Georgia (country)) Luka Janezashvili	TF 10–0	March 3–4, 2023	2023 Dan Kolov & Nikola Petrov Tournament	Sofia, Bulgaria
Win	95–43	(South Korea) Changsu Kim	6–2	March 3–4, 2023	2023 Dan Kolov & Nikola Petrov Tournament	Sofia, Bulgaria
2023 Ibrahim Moustafa Open (silver) at 65 kg
Loss	94–43	(Armenia) Vazgen Tevanyan	2–8	February 26, 2023	2023 Ibrahim Moustafa Tournament	Alexandria, Egypt
Win	94–42	(Puerto Rico) Sebastian Rivera	10–2	February 26, 2023	2023 Ibrahim Moustafa Tournament	Alexandria, Egypt
Win	93–42	(Ukraine) Erik Arushanian	8–2	February 26, 2023	2023 Ibrahim Moustafa Tournament	Alexandria, Egypt
Win	92–42	(Azerbaijan) Timur Aitkulov	TF 11–0	February 26, 2023	2023 Ibrahim Moustafa Tournament	Alexandria, Egypt
Win	91–42	(Algeria) Zouheir Iftene	Fall	February 26, 2023	2023 Ibrahim Moustafa Tournament	Alexandria, Egypt
2023 Zagreb Open (silver) at 65 kg
Loss	90–42	(Mongolia) Tömör-Ochiryn Tulga	1–4	February 1, 2023	2023 Grand Prix Zagreb Open	Zagreb, Croatia
Win	90–41	(Japan) Ryoma Anraku	4–3	February 1, 2023	2023 Grand Prix Zagreb Open	Zagreb, Croatia
Win	89–41	(Azerbaijan) Ali Rahimzade	Fall	February 1, 2023	2023 Grand Prix Zagreb Open	Zagreb, Croatia
Win	88–41	(Israel) Josh Finesilver	TF 10–0	February 1, 2023	2023 Grand Prix Zagreb Open	Zagreb, Croatia
2022 D.A. Kunaev International (silver) at 65 kg
Loss	87–41	(Mongolia) Tömör-Ochiryn Tulga	2–8	November 3–5, 2022	2022 D.A. Kunaev International	Taraz, Kazakhstan
Win	87–40	(Kazakhstan) Azamat Shagapuly	TF 10–0	November 3–5, 2022	2022 D.A. Kunaev International	Taraz, Kazakhstan
Win	86–40	(Kazakhstan) Nursultan Sadyk	TF 10–0	November 3–5, 2022	2022 D.A. Kunaev International	Taraz, Kazakhstan
Win	85–40	(Kazakhstan) Timur Shanbaev	TF 10–0	November 3–5, 2022	2022 D.A. Kunaev International	Taraz, Kazakhstan
Win	84–40	(Uzbekistan) Alpamys Kdirnuyazov	TF 11–0	November 3–5, 2022	2022 D.A. Kunaev International	Taraz, Kazakhstan
2022 Poland Open (bronze) at 65 kg
Win	83–40	(Poland) Krzysztof Bienkowski	3–1	July 20, 2022	2022 Poland Open	Warsaw, Poland
Loss	82–40	(Mongolia) Tseveensürengiin Tsogbadrakh	1–2	July 20, 2022	2022 Poland Open	Warsaw, Poland
Win	82–39	(Switzerland) Nino Leutert	9–2	July 20, 2022	2022 Poland Open	Warsaw, Poland
Win	81–39	(Ukraine) Vasyl Shuptar	TF 10–0	July 20, 2022	2022 Poland Open	Warsaw, Poland
2022 US World Team Trials (bronze) at 65 kg
Win	80–39	(United States) Ian Parker	TF 11–0	May 21, 2022	2022 US World Team Trials Challenge	(United States) Coralville, Iowa
Win	79–39	(United States) Nick Lee	TF 13–3	May 21, 2022	2022 US World Team Trials Challenge	(United States) Coralville, Iowa
Win	79–39	(United States) Pat Lugo	TF 10–0	May 21, 2022	2022 US World Team Trials Challenge	(United States) Coralville, Iowa
Win	78–39	(United States) Josh Saunders	TF 10–0	May 21, 2022	2022 US World Team Trials Challenge	(United States) Coralville, Iowa
Loss	77–39	(United States) Ian Parker	5–8	May 21, 2022	2022 US World Team Trials Challenge	(United States) Coralville, Iowa
2022 Pan American Championships (gold) at 65 kg
Win	77–38	(Puerto Rico) Sebastian Rivera	TF 10–0	May 8, 2022	2022 Pan American Continental Championships	Acapulco, Mexico
Win	76–38	(Argentina) Agustín Destribats	13–5	May 8, 2022	2022 Pan American Continental Championships	Acapulco, Mexico
Win	75–38	(Chile) Andre Quispe	TF 10–0	May 8, 2022	2022 Pan American Continental Championships	Acapulco, Mexico
2022 Yasar Dogu (bronze) at 65 kg
Win		(Kyrgyzstan) Ikromzhon Khadzhimurodov	INJ	February 27, 2022	2022 Yasar Dogu International	Istanbul, Turkey
Win	74–38	(Romania) Nikolay Okhlopkov	Fall	February 27, 2022	2022 Yasar Dogu International	Istanbul, Turkey
Loss	73–38	(Russia) Zagir Shakhiev	9–11	February 27, 2022	2022 Yasar Dogu International	Istanbul, Turkey
Win	73–37	(United States) Evan Henderson	17–9	February 27, 2022	2022 Yasar Dogu International	Istanbul, Turkey
Win	72–37	(Kazakhstan) Bekzat Yermekbay	TF 15–4	February 27, 2022	2022 Yasar Dogu International	Istanbul, Turkey
Win	71–37	(Tajikistan) Kamal Begakov	TF 10–0	February 12, 2022	2022 Bout at the Ballpark	(United States) Arlington, Texas
2022 Ivan Yarygin Golden Grand Prix 5th at 65 kg
Loss	70–37	(Russia) Ibragim Ibragimov	4–6	January 27–30, 2022	Golden Grand Prix Ivan Yarygin 2022	Krasnoyarsk, Russia
Win	70–36	(Russia) Akhmed Chakaev	10–8	January 27–30, 2022	Golden Grand Prix Ivan Yarygin 2022	Krasnoyarsk, Russia
Win	69–36	(Russia) Ibragim Abutalimov	TF 10–0	January 27–30, 2022	Golden Grand Prix Ivan Yarygin 2022	Krasnoyarsk, Russia
Loss	68–36	(Russia) Ramazan Ferzaliev	1–6	January 27–30, 2022	Golden Grand Prix Ivan Yarygin 2022	Krasnoyarsk, Russia
Win	68–35	(Belarus) Uladislau Koika	TF	January 27–30, 2022	Golden Grand Prix Ivan Yarygin 2022	Krasnoyarsk, Russia
2021 US World Team Trials (silver) at 65 kg
Loss	67–35	(United States) Yianni Diakomihalis	TF 2–12	September 12, 2021	2021 US World Team Trials	(United States) Lincoln, Nebraska
Loss	67–34	(United States) Yianni Diakomihalis	2–5	September 12, 2021	2021 US World Team Trials	(United States) Lincoln, Nebraska
Win	67–33	(United States) Yianni Diakomihalis	8–7	September 12, 2021	2021 US World Team Trials	(United States) Lincoln, Nebraska
Win	66–33	(United States) Evan Henderson	10–9	September 11, 2021	2021 US World Team Trials	(United States) Lincoln, Nebraska
2021 Poland Open (bronze) at 65 kg
Win		(Ukraine) Vasyl Shuptar	FF	June 9, 2021	2021 Poland Open	Warsaw, Poland
Loss	65–33	(United States) Yianni Diakomihalis	TF 4–15	June 9, 2021	2021 Poland Open	Warsaw, Poland
Loss	65–32	(Ukraine) Vasyl Shuptar	4–6	June 9, 2021	2021 Poland Open	Warsaw, Poland
Win	65–31	(Ukraine) Andriy Svyryd	8–0	June 9, 2021	2021 Poland Open	Warsaw, Poland
2021 Pan American Championships (gold) at 65 kg
Win	64–31	(Brazil) Marcos de Brito	TF 10–0	May 30, 2021	2021 Pan American Continental Championships	Guatemala City, Guatemala
Win	63–31	(Puerto Rico) Sebastian Rivera	TF 10–0	May 30, 2021	2021 Pan American Continental Championships	Guatemala City, Guatemala
Win	62–31	(Dominican Republic) Albaro Rudesindo Camacho	TF 17–6	May 30, 2021	2021 Pan American Continental Championships	Guatemala City, Guatemala
Win	61–31	(El Salvador) Juan Rodriguez Jovel	TF 10–0	May 30, 2021	2021 Pan American Continental Championships	Guatemala City, Guatemala
2020 US Olympic Team Trials (silver) at 65 kg
Loss	60–31	(United States) Jordan Oliver	2–5	April 2–3, 2021	2020 US Olympic Team Trials	(United States) Fort Worth, Texas
Loss	60–30	(United States) Jordan Oliver	0–3	April 2–3, 2021	2020 US Olympic Team Trials	(United States) Fort Worth, Texas
Win	60–29	(United States) Zain Retherford	8–5	April 2–3, 2021	2020 US Olympic Team Trials	(United States) Fort Worth, Texas
Win	59–29	(United States) James Green	TF 12–1	April 2–3, 2021	2020 US Olympic Team Trials	(United States) Fort Worth, Texas
2021 Matteo Pellicone Ranking Series (bronze) at 65 kg
Win	58–29	(Turkey) Selim Kozan	8–2	March 6, 2021	Matteo Pellicone Ranking Series 2021	Rome, Italy
Loss	57–29	(India) Bajrang Punia	3–6	March 6, 2021	Matteo Pellicone Ranking Series 2021	Rome, Italy
Win	57–28	(Slovenia) David Habat	7–3	March 6, 2021	Matteo Pellicone Ranking Series 2021	Rome, Italy
2021 Ukrainian Memorial International DNP at 65 kg
Loss	56–28	(Azerbaijan) Turan Bayramov	1–5	February 26, 2021	XXIV Outstanding Ukrainian Wrestlers and Coaches Memorial	Kyiv, Ukraine
Win	56–27	(Belarus) Niurgun Skriabin	10–3	February 26, 2021	XXIV Outstanding Ukrainian Wrestlers and Coaches Memorial	Kyiv, Ukraine
Win	55–27	(Algeria) Amar Laissaoui	TF 12–2	February 26, 2021	XXIV Outstanding Ukrainian Wrestlers and Coaches Memorial	Kyiv, Ukraine
Win	54–27	(United States) Seth Gross	TF 10–0	January 13, 2021	FloWrestling: Burroughs vs. Taylor	(United States) Austin, Texas
Win	53–27	(United States) Nahshon Garrett	TF 12–2	January 9, 2021	FloWrestling: Mensah-Stock vs. Gray	(United States) Austin, Texas
2020 US Nationals (bronze) at 65 kg
Win	52–27	(United States) Yahya Thomas	6–1	October 10–11, 2020	2020 US Senior Nationals	(United States) Coralville, Iowa
Win	51–27	(United States) Jaydin Eierman	TF 10–0	October 10–11, 2020	2020 US Senior Nationals	(United States) Coralville, Iowa
Win	50–27	(United States) Nick Dardanes	8–2	October 10–11, 2020	2020 US Senior Nationals	(United States) Coralville, Iowa
Win	49–27	(United States) Chad Red	TF 14–4	October 10–11, 2020	2020 US Senior Nationals	(United States) Coralville, Iowa
Loss	48–27	(United States) Andrew Alirez	4–6	October 10–11, 2020	2020 US Senior Nationals	(United States) Coralville, Iowa
Win	48–26	(United States) Jaden Abas	TF 10–0	October 10–11, 2020	2020 US Senior Nationals	(United States) Coralville, Iowa
Win	47–26	(United States) Kevon Davenport	TF 11–0	October 10–11, 2020	2020 US Senior Nationals	(United States) Coralville, Iowa
Win	46–26	(United States) Caleb Craig	TF 10–0	October 10–11, 2020	2020 US Senior Nationals	(United States) Coralville, Iowa
Loss	45–26	(United States) Tyler Berger	2–8	August 30, 2020	Chael Sonnen's Wrestling Underground I	United States
2020 Ivan Yarygin Golden Grand Prix 9th at 65 kg
Loss	45–25	(Buryatia) Dasha Sharastepanov	2–4	January 23–26, 2020	Golden Grand Prix Ivan Yarygin 2020	Krasnoyarsk, Russia
Win	45–24	(Mongolia) Tulga Tumur	4–3	January 23–26, 2020	Golden Grand Prix Ivan Yarygin 2020	Krasnoyarsk, Russia
Win	44–24	(Russia) Muslim Saidulaev	5–2	January 23–26, 2020	Golden Grand Prix Ivan Yarygin 2020	Krasnoyarsk, Russia
2020 Matteo Pellicone Ranking Series 7th at 65 kg
Loss	43–24	(United States) Zain Retherford	5–10	January 15–18, 2020	Matteo Pellicone Ranking Series 2020	Rome, Italy
Loss	43–23	(India) Bajrang Punia	2–4	January 15–18, 2020	Matteo Pellicone Ranking Series 2020	Rome, Italy
Win	43–22	(Italy) Abdellatif Mansour	TF 12–2	January 15–18, 2020	Matteo Pellicone Ranking Series 2020	Rome, Italy
2019 US Nationals (silver) at 65 kg
Loss	42–22	(United States) Jordan Oliver	TF 0–10	December 20–22, 2019	2019 Senior Nationals - US Olympic Trials Qualifier	(United States) Fort Worth, Texas
Win	42–21	(United States) Yianni Diakomihalis	6–5	December 20–22, 2019	2019 Senior Nationals - US Olympic Trials Qualifier	(United States) Fort Worth, Texas
Win	41–21	(United States) Evan Henderson	TF 11–1	December 20–22, 2019	2019 Senior Nationals - US Olympic Trials Qualifier	(United States) Fort Worth, Texas
Win	40–21	(United States) Jayson Ness	8–2	December 20–22, 2019	2019 Senior Nationals - US Olympic Trials Qualifier	(United States) Fort Worth, Texas
Win	39–21	(United States) Rob Mathers	TF 10–0	December 20–22, 2019	2019 Senior Nationals - US Olympic Trials Qualifier	(United States) Fort Worth, Texas
2019 Bill Farrell M. International Open 4th at 65 kg
Loss	38–21	(United States) Evan Henderson	12–14	November 15–16, 2019	2019 Bill Farrell Memorial International Open	(United States) New York City, New York
Win	38–20	(United States) Ben Whitford	TF 10-0	November 15–16, 2019	2019 Bill Farrell Memorial International Open	(United States) New York City, New York
Loss	37–20	(United States) Jordan Oliver	3–5	November 15–16, 2019	2019 Bill Farrell Memorial International Open	(United States) New York City, New York
Win	37–19	(United States) Dean Heil	TF 10-0	November 15–16, 2019	2019 Bill Farrell Memorial International Open	(United States) New York City, New York
Win	36–19	(Mongolia) Byambasuren Uuganbayar	TF 11–0	November 15–16, 2019	2019 Bill Farrell Memorial International Open	(United States) New York City, New York
Win	35–19	(United States) Mario Mason	4–0	November 15–16, 2019	2019 Bill Farrell Memorial International Open	(United States) New York City, New York
2019 US Last Chance WTT (silver) at 65 kg
Loss	34–19	(United States) Dean Heil	2–5	May 3, 2019	2019 US Senior Last Chance World Team Trials Qualifier	(United States) East Stroudsburg, Pennsylvania
Win	34–18	(United States) Evan Henderson	10–6	May 3, 2019	2019 US Senior Last Chance World Team Trials Qualifier	(United States) East Stroudsburg, Pennsylvania
Win	33–18	(United States) Jake Jones	TF 11–0	May 3, 2019	2019 US Senior Last Chance World Team Trials Qualifier	(United States) East Stroudsburg, Pennsylvania
2019 US Open DNP at 65 kg
Loss	32–18	(United States) Frank Molinaro	3–6	April 24–27, 2019	2019 US Open National Championships	(United States) Las Vegas, Nevada
Win	32–17	(United States) Bryce Meredith	TF 10–0	April 24–27, 2019	2019 US Open National Championships	(United States) Las Vegas, Nevada
Win	31–17	(United States) Ben Freeman	TF 10–0	April 24–27, 2019	2019 US Open National Championships	(United States) Las Vegas, Nevada
Loss	30–17	(United States) Dean Heil	9–12	April 24–27, 2019	2019 US Open National Championships	(United States) Las Vegas, Nevada
Win	30–16	(United States) Chris Deloza	TF 10–0	April 24–27, 2019	2019 US Open National Championships	(United States) Las Vegas, Nevada
2018 Alexander Medved Prizes 14th at 65 kg
Loss	29–16	(Azerbaijan) Haji Aliyev	TF 0–10	September 14–16, 2018	2018 Alexander Medved Prizes	Minsk, Belarus
2018 US World Team Trials (silver) at 65 kg
Loss	29–15	(United States) Logan Stieber	0–8	June 15–16, 2018	2018 Final X: State College	(United States) State College, Pennsylvania
Loss	29–14	(United States) Logan Stieber	8–8	June 15–16, 2018	2018 Final X: State College	(United States) State College, Pennsylvania
2018 US Open (gold) at 65 kg
Win	29–13	(United States) Jaydin Eierman	7–3	April 24–28, 2018	2018 US Open National Championships	(United States) Las Vegas, Nevada
Win	28–13	(United States) Evan Henderson	TF 10–0	April 24–28, 2018	2018 US Open National Championships	(United States) Las Vegas, Nevada
Win	27–13	(United States) Robbie Mathers	TF 11-0	April 24–28, 2018	2018 US Open National Championships	(United States) Las Vegas, Nevada
Win	26–13	(United States) Darren Wynn	TF 12–0	April 24–28, 2018	2018 US Open National Championships	(United States) Las Vegas, Nevada
Win	25–13	(United States) Darick Lapaglia	TF 10–0	April 24–28, 2018	2018 US Open National Championships	(United States) Las Vegas, Nevada
2017 U23 World Championships (bronze) at 65 kg
Win	24–13	(Belarus) Heorhi Kaliyeu	2–0	November 21–26, 2017	2017 U23 World Wrestling Championships	Bydgoszcz, Poland
Win	23–13	(Mongolia) Tulga Tumur Ochir	6–1	November 21–26, 2017	2017 U23 World Wrestling Championships	Bydgoszcz, Poland
Win	22–13	(Moldova) Maxim Saculțan	9–6	November 21–26, 2017	2017 U23 World Wrestling Championships	Bydgoszcz, Poland
Loss	21–13	(Russia) Nachyn Kuular	TF 0–10	November 21–26, 2017	2017 U23 World Wrestling Championships	Bydgoszcz, Poland
Win	21–12	(Poland) Patryk Olenczyn	TF 11–0	November 21–26, 2017	2017 U23 World Wrestling Championships	Bydgoszcz, Poland
2017 US U23 World Team Trials (gold) at 65 kg
Win	20–12	(United States) Boo Lewallen	8–4	October 7–8, 2017	2017 US U23 World Team Trials	(United States) Rochester, Minnesota
Win	19–12	(United States) Boo Lewallen	5–1	October 7–8, 2017	2017 US U23 World Team Trials	(United States) Rochester, Minnesota
Win	18–12	(United States) Brock Zacherl	3–2	October 7–8, 2017	2017 US U23 World Team Trials	(United States) Rochester, Minnesota
Win	17–12	(United States) Dylan Thurston	TF 10–0	October 7–8, 2017	2017 US U23 World Team Trials	(United States) Rochester, Minnesota
2017 Ion Cornianu & Ladislau Simon (bronze) at 65 kg
Win	16–12	(Turkey) Haydar Yavuz	8–2	July 21–23, 2017	2017 Ion Cornianu & Ladislau Simon Memorial	Bucharest, Romania
Win	15–12	(Turkey) Kilicsallayah Selahattin	5–3	July 21–23, 2017	2017 Ion Cornianu & Ladislau Simon Memorial	Bucharest, Romania
Loss	14–12	(United States) BJ Futrell	0–6	July 21–23, 2017	2017 Ion Cornianu & Ladislau Simon Memorial	Bucharest, Romania
Win	14–11	(Poland) Maxim Saculțan	9–2	July 21–23, 2017	2017 Ion Cornianu & Ladislau Simon Memorial	Bucharest, Romania
2016 Poland Open (bronze) at 65 kg
Win	14311	(Japan) Masakazu Kamoi	5–4	June 17–19, 2016	2016 Poland Open, Ziolkowski & Pytlasinski Memorial International	Spala, Poland
Loss	12–11	(China) Yeerlanbieke Katai	2–8	June 17–19, 2016	2016 Poland Open, Ziolkowski & Pytlasinski Memorial International	Spala, Poland
Win	12–10	(Poland) Mateuz Nejman	Fall	June 17–19, 2016	2016 Poland Open, Ziolkowski & Pytlasinski Memorial International	Spala, Poland
2015 US World Team Trials DNP at 65 kg
Loss	11–10	(United States) Jordan Oliver	TF 0–10	June 14–15, 2015	2015 US World Team Trials Challenge	(United States) Madison, Wisconsin
2015 US Senior Nationals 4th at 61 kg
Loss	11–9	(United States) Coleman Scott	TF 0–10	May 7–9, 2015	2015 US Senior National Championships	(United States) Las Vegas, Nevada
Loss	11–8	(United States) Daniel Dennis	4–6	May 7–9, 2015	2015 US Senior National Championships	(United States) Las Vegas, Nevada
Win	11–7	(United States) Pat Garcia	TF 12–2	May 7–9, 2015	2015 US Senior National Championships	(United States) Las Vegas, Nevada
Win	10–7	(United States) Curtis Hulstine	TF 10–0	May 7–9, 2015	2015 US Senior National Championships	(United States) Las Vegas, Nevada
2015 Alexander Medved Prizes 21st at 61 kg
Loss	9–7	(Azerbaijan) Ruslan Mammadov	0–7	March 5–7, 2015	2015 Alexander Medved Prizes	Minsk, Belarus
Win	9–6	(Georgia (country)) Shota Phartenadze	10–2	March 5–7, 2015	2015 Alexander Medved Prizes	Minsk, Belarus
2015 Granma y Cerro Pelado (gold) at 61 kg
Win	8–6	(Cuba) Dabian Quintana	8–5	February 11–15, 2015	2015 Granma y Cerro Pelado International	Havana, Cuba
Loss	7–6	(Cuba) Yowlys Bonne	TF 6–18	February 11–15, 2015	2015 Granma y Cerro Pelado International	Havana, Cuba
Win	7–5	(Cuba) Maikel Perez	9–5	February 11–15, 2015	2015 Granma y Cerro Pelado International	Havana, Cuba
2015 Dave Schultz M. International DNP at 61 kg
Loss	6–5	(Japan) Yo Nakata	2–3	January 28–31, 2015	2015 Dave Schultz Memorial International	(United States) Colorado Springs, Colorado
Loss	6–4	(India) Bajrang Punia	2–3	January 28–31, 2015	2015 Dave Schultz Memorial International	(United States) Colorado Springs, Colorado
Win	6–3	(United States) Jim Gauntlett	TF 10–0	January 28–31, 2015	2015 Dave Schultz Memorial International	(United States) Colorado Springs, Colorado
2014 Brazil Cup (bronze) at 61 kg
Win	5–3	(Brazil) Juliano Carvalho	TF 14–3	November 28–30, 2014	2014 Copa Brasil	Rio de Janeiro, Brazil
Loss	4–3	(Japan) Yo Nakata	2–3	November 28–30, 2014	2014 Copa Brasil	Rio de Janeiro, Brazil
Win	4–2	(Russia) Nachyn Kuular	11–8	November 28–30, 2014	2014 Copa Brasil	Rio de Janeiro, Brazil
2014 Bill Farrell M. International 4th at 65 kg
Loss	3–2	(Russia) Shikhsaid Dzhalilov	2–5	November 7–9, 2014	2014 Bill Farrell Memorial International	(United States) New York City, New York
Win		(United States) Reece Humphrey	INJ	November 7–9, 2014	2014 Bill Farrell Memorial International	(United States) New York City, New York
Win	3–1	(United States) Steven Pami	11–6	November 7–9, 2014	2014 Bill Farrell Memorial International	(United States) New York City, New York
Win	2–1	(United States) Brett Robbins	6–1	November 7–9, 2014	2014 Bill Farrell Memorial International	(United States) New York City, New York
Win	1–1	(Japan) Kojiro Kurimori	3–1	November 7–9, 2014	2014 Bill Farrell Memorial International	(United States) New York City, New York
Loss	0–1	(Russia) Shikhsaid Dzhalilov	2–5	November 7–9, 2014	2014 Bill Farrell Memorial International	(United States) New York City, New York

== NCAA record ==
NCAA Championships Matches
Res.	Record	Opponent	Score	Date	Event
2019 NCAA Championships (silver) at 141 lbs
Loss	17–5	Yianni Diakomihalis	SV–1 4–6	March 20–22, 2019	2019 NCAA Division I National Championships
Win	17–4	Nick Lee	4–3	March 20–22, 2019	2019 NCAA Division I National Championships
Win	16–4	Mitch McKee	MD 11–1	March 20–22, 2019	2019 NCAA Division I National Championships
Win	15–4	Kaid Brock	MD 14–1	March 20–22, 2019	2019 NCAA Division I National Championships
Win	14–4	Grant Willits	TF 20–5	March 20–22, 2019	2019 NCAA Division I National Championships
2018 NCAA Championships (bronze) at 141 lbs
Win	13–4	Jaydin Eierman	7–2	March 15–17, 2018	2018 NCAA Division I National Championships
Win	12–4	Kevin Jack	4–3	March 15–17, 2018	2018 NCAA Division I National Championships
Loss	11–4	Bryce Meredith	0–1	March 15–17, 2018	2018 NCAA Division I National Championships
Win	11–3	Tyler Smith	8–3	March 15–17, 2018	2018 NCAA Division I National Championships
Win	10–3	Luke Karam	TF 15–0	March 15–17, 2018	2018 NCAA Division I National Championships
Win	9–3	Alex Madrigal	TF 16–1	March 15–17, 2018	2018 NCAA Division I National Championships
2017 NCAA Championships DNP at 141 lbs
Loss	8–3	Jaydin Eierman	MD 0–8	March 16–18, 2017	2017 NCAA Division I National Championships
Win	8–2	Randy Cruz	4–3	March 16–18, 2017	2017 NCAA Division I National Championships
Win	7–2	Ryan Diehl	MD 9–0	March 16–18, 2017	2017 NCAA Division I National Championships
Loss	6–2	Thomas Thorn	Fall	March 16–18, 2017	2017 NCAA Division I National Championships
Win	6–1	Dylan Caruana	6–0	March 16–18, 2017	2017 NCAA Division I National Championships
2016 NCAA Championships (bronze) at 141 lbs
Win	5–1	Anthony Ashnault	7–6	March 17–19, 2016	2016 NCAA Division I National Championships
Win	4–1	Chris Mecate	3–1	March 17–19, 2016	2016 NCAA Division I National Championships
Loss	3–1	Bryce Meredith	3–5	March 17–19, 2016	2016 NCAA Division I National Championships
Win	3–0	Solomon Chishko	6–1	March 17–19, 2016	2016 NCAA Division I National Championships
Win	2–0	Brock Zacherl	4–2	March 17–19, 2016	2016 NCAA Division I National Championships
Win	1–0	Zachary Horan	TB–1 2–1	March 17–19, 2016	2016 NCAA Division I National Championships

=== Stats ===
Season	Year	School	Rank	Weigh Class	Record	Win	Bonus
2019	Senior	Ohio State University	#3 (2nd)	141	24–3	88.89%	55.56%
2018	Junior	Ohio State University	#4 (3rd)	141	21–2	91.30%	39.13%
2017	Sophomore	Stanford University	#7 (DNP)	141	32–3	91.43%	51.43%
2016	Freshman	Stanford University	#4 (3rd)	141	28–3	90.32%	45.16%
Career					105–11	90.52%	49.14%
