= 2023 World Wrestling Championships – Men's freestyle 70 kg =

Wrestling competitions

Men's freestyle 70 kg at the 2023 World Championships
- Venue: Štark Arena
- Dates: 16–17 September 2023
- Competitors: 30 from 27 nations

Medalists
gold medal	Zain Retherford	United States
silver medal	Amir Mohammad Yazdani	Iran
bronze medal	Ramazan Ramazanov	Bulgaria
bronze medal	Arman Andreasyan	Armenia

The men's freestyle 70 kilograms is a competition featured at the 2023 World Wrestling Championships, and was held in Belgrade, Serbia on 16 and 17 September 2023.

This freestyle wrestling competition consists of a single-elimination tournament, with a repechage used to determine the winner of two bronze medals. The two finalists face off for gold and silver medals. Each wrestler who loses to one of the two finalists moves into the repechage, culminating in a pair of bronze medal matches featuring the semifinal losers each facing the remaining repechage opponent from their half of the bracket.

== Results ==
Legend

- F — Won by fall

=== Final ===
Final
Amir Mohammad Yazdani (IRI)	5
Zain Retherford (USA)	8

=== Top half ===
Round of 32
Marc Dietsche (SUI)	10^{F}
Brian Oloo (KEN)	0
Patryk Ołenczyn (POL)	1
Amir Mohammad Yazdani (IRI)	11
Magomed Bashir Khaniev (AZE)	9
Sanzhar Doszhanov (KAZ)	2
Ramazan Ramazanov (BUL)	11
Perman Hommadow (TKM)	0
Dániel Antal (HUN)	9^{F}
Nikita Dmitrijevs Mayeuski (AIN)	4
Cristian Santiago (MEX)	0
Amr Reda Hussen (EGY)	10
Enkhtuyaagiin Temüülen (MGL)	2
Giorgi Elbakidze (GEO)	8

Round of 16
Ernazar Akmataliev (KGZ)	12
Marc Dietsche (SUI)	6
Amir Mohammad Yazdani (IRI)	6
Magomed Bashir Khaniev (AZE)	0
Ramazan Ramazanov (BUL)	15
Dániel Antal (HUN)	4
Amr Reda Hussen (EGY)	14
Giorgi Elbakidze (GEO)	4

Quarterfinals
Ernazar Akmataliev (KGZ)	0
Amir Mohammad Yazdani (IRI)	10
Ramazan Ramazanov (BUL)	10^{F}
Amr Reda Hussen (EGY)	2

Semifinals
Amir Mohammad Yazdani (IRI)	13
Ramazan Ramazanov (BUL)	2

=== Bottom half ===
Round of 32
Arman Andreasyan (ARM)	4
Cao Nan (CHN)	1
Michael Asselstine (CAN)	0
Fati Vejseli (MKD)	7
Yevgeny Zherbaev (AIN)	5
Yoshinosuke Aoyagi (JPN)	9
Jeong Yong-seok (KOR)	1
Servet Coşkun (TUR)	4
Ihor Nykyforuk (UKR)	9
Abhimanyou Mandwal (UWW)	19^{F}
Nicolai Grahmez (MDA)	15
Zafarbek Otakhonov (UZB)	6
Mustafo Akhmedov (TJK)	8
Kevin Henkel (GER)	0

Round of 16
Arman Andreasyan (ARM)	5
Fati Vejseli (MKD)	2
Yoshinosuke Aoyagi (JPN)	6
Servet Coşkun (TUR)	4
Abhimanyou Mandwal (UWW)	13
Nicolai Grahmez (MDA)	2
Mustafo Akhmedov (TJK)	0
Zain Retherford (USA)	4

Quarterfinals
Arman Andreasyan (ARM)	5
Yoshinosuke Aoyagi (JPN)	3
Abhimanyou Mandwal (UWW)	2
Zain Retherford (USA)	9

Semifinals
Arman Andreasyan (ARM)	0
Zain Retherford (USA)	7

=== Repechage ===
Repechage round 1
Patryk Ołenczyn (POL)	13
Magomed Bashir Khaniev (AZE)	10

Repechage round 2
Patryk Ołenczyn (POL)	3
Ernazar Akmataliev (KGZ)	7
Mustafo Akhmedov (TJK)	1
Abhimanyou Mandwal (UWW)	3

Bronze medals
Ernazar Akmataliev (KGZ)	6
Ramazan Ramazanov (BUL)	8
Abhimanyou Mandwal (UWW)	1
Arman Andreasyan (ARM)	12

== Final standing ==
Rank	Athlete
1st place, gold medalist(s)	Zain Retherford (USA)
2nd place, silver medalist(s)	Amir Mohammad Yazdani (IRI)
3rd place, bronze medalist(s)	Ramazan Ramazanov (BUL)
3rd place, bronze medalist(s)	Arman Andreasyan (ARM)
5	Ernazar Akmataliev (KGZ)
5	Abhimanyou Mandwal (UWW)
7	Amr Reda Hussen (EGY)
8	Yoshinosuke Aoyagi (JPN)
9	Marc Dietsche (SUI)
10	Dániel Antal (HUN)
11	Patryk Ołenczyn (POL)
12	Magomed Bashir Khaniev (AZE)
13	Nicolai Grahmez (MDA)
14	Giorgi Elbakidze (GEO)
15	Fati Vejseli (MKD)
16	Mustafo Akhmedov (TJK)
17	Servet Coşkun (TUR)
18	Zafarbek Otakhonov (UZB)
19	Yevgeny Zherbaev (AIN)
20	Enkhtuyaagiin Temüülen (MGL)
21	Sanzhar Doszhanov (KAZ)
22	Cao Nan (CHN)
23	Jeong Yong-seok (KOR)
24	Ihor Nykyforuk (UKR)
25	Nikita Dmitrijevs Mayeuski (AIN)
26	Michael Asselstine (CAN)
27	Kevin Henkel (GER)
28	Brian Oloo (KEN)
29	Cristian Santiago (MEX)
30	Perman Hommadow (TKM)
