= Zain Retherford =

American wrestler (born 1995)

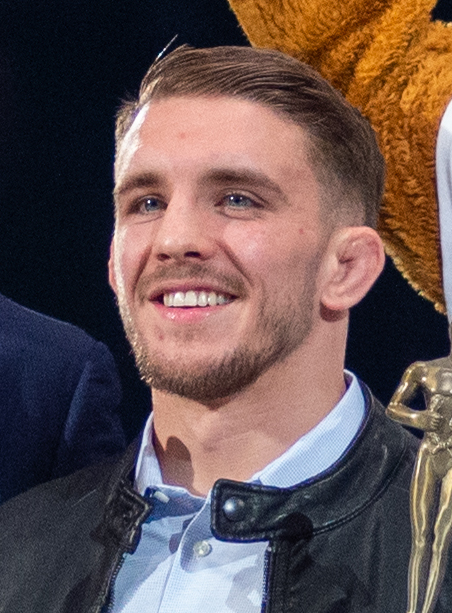
- Retherford in 2020

Personal information
- Full name: Zain Allen Retherford
- Born: May 21, 1995 (age 31) Kenosha, Wisconsin, U.S.
- Home town: Benton, Pennsylvania, U.S.
- Height: 5 ft 8 in (173 cm)
- Weight: 65 kg (143 lb); 70 kg (154 lb)
- Website: zainretherford.com

Sport
- Country: United States
- Sport: Wrestling
- Events: Freestyle and Folkstyle
- College team: Penn State
- Club: Nittany Lion Wrestling Club; Titan Mercury Wrestling Club
- Coached by: Cael Sanderson
- Now coaching: Nittany Lion Wrestling Club
Medal record
Men's freestyle wrestling
Representing the United States
World Championships
Gold medal – first place	2023 Belgrade	70 kg
Silver medal – second place	2022 Belgrade	70 kg
Bronze medal – third place	2026 Astana	70 kg
World Cup
Bronze medal – third place	2019 Yakutsk	Team
Pan American Championships
Gold medal – first place	2023 Buenos Aires	70 kg
Cadet World Championships
Gold medal – first place	2012 Baku	63 kg
Men's collegiate wrestling
Representing the Penn State Nittany Lions
NCAA Division I Championships
Gold medal – first place	2016 New York	149 lb
Gold medal – first place	2017 St. Louis	149 lb
Gold medal – first place	2018 Cleveland	149 lb
Big Ten Championships
Gold medal – first place	2016 Iowa City	149 lb
Gold medal – first place	2017 Bloomington	149 lb
Gold medal – first place	2018 East Lansing	149 lb
Silver medal – second place	2014 Madison	141 lb

Zain Allen Retherford (/ˈrɛðərfərd/ REDH-ər-fərd; born May 21, 1995) is an American freestyle wrestler and graduated folkstyle wrestler who competes at 70 kilograms. He is currently coaching the Nittany Lion Wrestling Club.

One of the most successful Penn State Nittany Lion wrestlers of all time, Retherford was a two-time Dan Hodge Trophy winner and a three-time NCAA Division I National champion.

In freestyle, he is a gold and silver medalist at the World Championships, as well as a Pan-American champion. He competed at the 2024 Summer Olympics.

== Early life and education ==
Retherford was born in Kenosha, Wisconsin. Early in life, he moved to Benton, Pennsylvania. He attended Line Mountain High School, where he won a Pennsylvania state wrestling title as a freshman and took third place as a sophomore. He went on to compile a record of 84–3 before moving to Benton High School in his junior year. As a result of the move, Retherford was declared unable to compete in the 2011-12 season. Russ Hughes, his high school coach, states that it was in this time when Retherford started to really focus and grow as a wrestler. As a senior, he compiled an unbeaten record of 47–0 and collected his second Pennsylvania state title. After the season, he became a Cadet World Champion in freestyle at 65-kilograms.

Retherford graduated from high school with a 131–3 record and two PIAA Class AA state titles.

== College career ==
Retherford was considered the #3 recruit in the country in 2012. He committed to the Nittany Lions at Penn State University.

=== 2013-14 ===
Retherford had incredible success as a true freshman, going 27–0 in regular season. He made his way to the Big Ten Conference finals to face defending NCAA champion (eventual four-timer) Logan Stieber, whom he lost to by 4 points, making him the runner-up of the tournament. At the NCAA championships, Retherford defeated an unseeded opponent in the first round and also the eleventh and fourteenth seeds before losing to the second-seeded Logan Stieber once again. After losing in the semifinals, he faced and lost to top-seeded Mitchell Port in the consolation semis, ending his run at the tournament and placing fifth, which earned him All-American status.

=== 2014-15 ===
In this season, Retherford chose to redshirt to focus on training and freestyle, placing second at the Junior World Team Trials and fourth at the 2015 Dave Schultz Memorial International.

=== 2015-16 ===
As a sophomore, Retherford moved up to 149-pounds and closed the regular season undefeated with a 26–0 record before the Big Ten's. At the tournament, he defeated the eight and fifth seeds to make his way to the finale. where he downed second-seeded Brandon Sorensen to win the championship. At the NCAA's, he dominated with a technical fall (21-6) to start the tournament, accumulated 3 pins in a row and a major in the finals to close the tournament and claim his first NCAA title. He was named the year's NCAA Most Dominant Wrestler, Penn State Male Athlete of the Year, Big Ten Wrestler of the Year, and received the 2016 Wade Schalles Award for best collegiate pinner.

=== 2016-17 ===
In his junior year, he continued to establish dominance, staying in the top-spot of the division through the regular season. At the Big Ten Championships he downed four opponents with three falls and a technical fall (16-1) to become a two-time Big Ten Champion. At the NCAA Championships, he went 5–0 with four technical falls and a pin at the tournament to claim his second-straight NCAA Championship, making him the seventh Nittany Lion to do so. Due to his efforts, he was named the NCAA and Big Ten Championships Outstanding Wrestler. He ended the season with a 28–0 mark with seventeen pins, seven techs and a major, near to a 90 percent of bonus points in matches.

He then earned the Dan Hodge Trophy award as the most dominant wrestler in NCAA Division I along with that year's NCAA Most Dominant Wrestler and Wade Schalles Award winner for the second time in a row.

=== 2017-18 ===
As a senior, he remained unbeaten at 149-pounds with a 31–0 record. At the Big Ten's, he defeated three ranked wrestlers with two majors and one decision by points to claim his third-straight B1G Championship. At the NCAA Championships, he opened up with a tech (16-1) and a pin before another tech (20-2) in the quarterfinals. In his next two matches he won by decision (10-4 and 6-2), claiming his third-straight NCAA title.

After the season, he became only the fourth person to be awarded the prestigious Dan Hodge Trophy twice. He was also named NCAA Most Dominant Wrestler for the third straight time and Big Ten Wrestler of the Year for the second time. In his four seasons at PSU, he graduated with a 128–3 record (all of his losses coming as a freshman).

Overall, Retherford is a two-time Dan Hodge Trophy winner, three-time NCAA Champion, four-time All-American, three-time Big Ten Champion and four-time Big Ten finalist.

== Freestyle career ==
As a cadet and a junior, Retherford already had prestigious freestyle accomplishments; Cadet World and National champion and three-time Junior National runner-up.

=== 2015 ===
At the Dave Schultz Memorial, Retherford lost to Jordan Oliver in the quarterfinals (2-6). In the repechage matches, he made his way to the third place match by beating Evan Henderson (10-7), Borislav Novachkov (injury default) and Murad Nukhadiev (9-2). In the bronze-medal match, he faced Andrey Kviatkovski, whom he lost to (4-8), placing fourth in his first competition as a senior.

=== 2016 ===
At the US Olympic Team Trials, Retherford defeated James Green (9-2) in the preliminary match and advanced to the quarterfinals, where he faced Logan Stieber, whom he lost to (6-8). In the repechage matches, he downed Jason Chamberlain (7-2), Jayson Ness (6-3) and Jimmy Kennedy (2-2) to place third in the tournament.

=== 2017 ===
At the US Open, Retherford placed third after losing to Jordan Oliver in the semifinals, qualifying for the World Team Trials Tournament. He won the Challenge Tournament and went on to face Frank Molinaro at the wrestle-offs. He won the 2-out-of-3 matches, losing the first one (6-7) and dominantly winning the other two (6-0, 7-4).

Retherford competed at the Spain Grand Prix before the World Championships. He dominated his opponents, not getting scored a single point and winning all of his matches (4-0, TF 11–0, 6–0, TF 10-0).

At the World Championships, Retherford teched (10-0) David Habat in the opening match but subsequently lost to Adam Batirov (4-6), getting eliminated and placing eleventh.

=== 2019 ===
At the Ivan Yarygin Golden Grand Prix, he lost in the opening bout to Gadzhimurad Rashidov (3-4) and got eliminated, placing eighth.

At the US Open, he downed 5 opponents before losing to Yianni Diakomihalis in the finals, this qualified him for the World Team Trials. At the Challenge Tournament, he defeated Dean Heil, Frank Molinaro and Jordan Oliver twice before competing at Final X: Rutgers against Yianni Diakomihalis. In the first match, Retherford beat Diakomihalis 10–4. The second match ended with a lot on controversy; Retherford was down 4-6 when he got a takedown for two points, Diakomihalis ended up earning two more to apparently win the match 8–6, however, there were problems with the scoring and that led to the match being scored 6–6 with an advantage on criteria to Retherford, winning the match and the Final X series.

He once again faced Yianni Diakomihalis in the qualification round of the Grand Prix Yaşar Doğu. He lost the match by points (9-5). He was then scheduled to compete at the Pan American Games, however, he was forced to pull out a week before the event and was replaced by Jaydin Eierman.

Due to the past controversy at Final X: Rutgers, Retherford faced Diakomihalis for the fifth time in their freestyle career in a wrestle-off called Final X: Yianni vs. Zain to determine who was going to represent the United States at the World Championships. He defeated Diakomihalis by two points to one.

Retherford competed at the World Championships weeks after his wrestle-off. He lost a close bout in the first round against Alejandro Valdés (9-10) and was eliminated, placing twenty-sixth.

Retherford competed at the Alan International in Russia. He downed Inar Kettia and Iulian Gergenov (TF 13–2, TF 11-0) prior to losing to Saiyn Kazyryk (4-6), placing seventh.

In his last tournament of 2019, he competed at the prestigious World Cup, where he ended up undefeated at 65 kilograms with four victories, claiming the individual World Cup championship and helping Team USA win the team bronze-medal.

=== 2020 ===
In his first competition of the year, Retherford competed at the Matteo Pellicone RS. He faced Bajrang Punia, whom he lost a close decision (4-5) in the opening round. He went on to place third as he beat Joey McKenna (10-5) and pinned Vasyl Shuptar in the repechage matches.

In an attempt to make his way to the Olympics, Retherford competed at the Pan American Olympic Qualification Tournament. He started strong, winning by technical superiority (10-0) in both of his first two bouts. In the semifinals, he faced Agustín Destribats. Retherford took him down early, however, Destribats was able to adjust and worked his way to the victory by fall, being the first wrestler to get the win in that fashion against Retherford in freestyle competition. In the third-place match, he faced Álbaro Rudesindo, whom he pinned.

Retherford was scheduled to compete at the 2020 US Olympic Team Trials on April 4 at State College, Pennsylvania. However, the event was postponed for 2021 along with the Summer Olympics due to the COVID-19 pandemic, leaving all the qualifiers unable to compete.

After six months without being able to compete, Retherford returned to the mats against three–time NCAA Division I All-American Alec Pantaleo on September 19 at the NLWC I, whom he outscored 3 points to 2. He then won by technical fall against three–time US National Champion and World Team Member Reece Humphrey on November 24, at the NLWC III. Retherford avenged his loss to Bajrang Punia at the Matteo Pellicone, when he flawlessly defeated him 6–0 at the NLWC IV of December 22.

=== 2021 ===
To start off the year, Retherford defeated Evan Henderson in February at the NLWC V. Retherford competed at the rescheduled 2020 US Olympic Team Trials from April 2 to 3 as the top–seed in an attempt of representing the United States at the 2020 Summer Olympics. He knocked off two–time Pan American Continental champion and 2019 NCAA champion Anthony Ashnault in the first round, but was unexpectedly upset by 2018 US Open champion Joey McKenna by decision. He lost his consolation match against 2021 NCAA champion from Penn State Nick Lee, failing to place.

Retherford bulked up to 70 kilograms for a comeback at the 2021 US World Team Trials on September 11–12, intending to represent the country at the World Championships. After losing in the first round in the hands of Jordan Oliver, Retherford made his way to a third-place finish. He is also a Senior Freestyle World Silver Medalist (70 kg; 2022). 2023 He won the gold medal in the 70 kg weight class at the 2023 World Wrestling Championships in Belgrade. He defeated Iranian wrestler Amir Mohammad Yazdani 8:5 in the final bout.

=== 2024 ===
Retherford lost to Tömör-Ochiryn Tulga at the 2024 World Wrestling Olympic Qualification Tournament, but still qualified for the Olympics after defeating Niurgun Skriabin in repechage.

At the 2024 Summer Olympics, Retherford was defeated by Rahman Amouzad and then withdrew from the remaining tournament due to a concussion.

=== 2026 ===
Retherford debuted for Real American Freestyle at RAF 09 on May 30, 2026, defeating Antrell Taylor.

He faced Ernazar Akmataliev at RAF Georgia on July 11, 2026. He lost by decision.

== Freestyle record ==
Senior Freestyle Matches
Res.	Record	Opponent	Score	Date	Event	Location
2026 US World Team Trials TBD at 70 kg
Win	92-21	(United States) Ridge Lovett	8-2	June 19, 2026	2026 Final X	(United States) Newark, New Jersey
Win	91-21	(United States) Ridge Lovett	2-1	June 19, 2026	2026 Final X	(United States) Newark, New Jersey
Win	90–21	(United States) Antrell Taylor	8–0	May 30, 2026	RAF 09	(United States) Arlington, Texas
Win	89–21	(United States) Caleb Henson	2–1	May 14–15, 2026	2026 US World Team Trials Challenge	(United States) Louisville, Kentucky
Win	88–21	(United States) Landon Robideau	3–2	May 14–15, 2026	2026 US World Team Trials Challenge	(United States) Louisville, Kentucky
2024 Summer Olympics 13th at 65 kg
Loss	87–21	(Albania) Islam Dudaev	0–5 (Forfeit)	August 10–11, 2024	2024 Summer Olympics	Paris, France
Loss	87–20	(Iran) Rahman Amouzad	0–8	August 10–11, 2024	2024 Summer Olympics	Paris, France
2024 World Olympic Qualification Tournament (bronze) at 65 kg
Win	87-19	(Belarus) Niurgun Skriabin	7–0	May 12, 2024	2024 World Olympic Qualification Tournament	Istanbul, Turkey
Win	86-19	(India) Sujeet Kalkal	2–2	May 11, 2024	2024 World Olympic Qualification Tournament	Istanbul, Turkey
Win	85-19	(Tajikistan) Abdulmazhid Kudiev	5–2	May 11, 2024	2024 World Olympic Qualification Tournament	Istanbul, Turkey
Win	84-19	(Bahrain) Alibeg Alibegov	Fall	May 11, 2024	2024 World Olympic Qualification Tournament	Istanbul, Turkey
Loss	83-19	(Mongolia) Tömör-Ochiryn Tulga	2–7	May 11, 2024	2024 World Olympic Qualification Tournament	Istanbul, Turkey
Win	83-18	(Yemen) Ibrahim Guzan	TF 11–0	May 11, 2024	2024 World Olympic Qualification Tournament	Istanbul, Turkey
Win	82-18	(Romania) Ștefan Coman	Fall	May 11, 2024	2024 World Olympic Qualification Tournament	Istanbul, Turkey
2024 US Olympic Team Trials (gold) at 65 kg
Win	81-18	(United States) Nick Lee	5–0	April 20, 2024	2024 US Olympic Team Trials	(United States) State College, Pennsylvania
Win	80-18	(United States) Nick Lee	2–1	April 20, 2024	2024 US Olympic Team Trials	(United States) State College, Pennsylvania
Win	79-18	(United States) Jesse Mendez	3–2	April 19, 2024	2024 US Olympic Team Trials	(United States) State College, Pennsylvania
2023 World Championships (gold) at 70 kg
Win	78-18	(Iran) Amir Mohammad Yazdani	8–5	September 16–17, 2023	2023 World Championships	Belgrade, Serbia
Win	77-18	(Armenia) Arman Andreasyan	7–0	September 16–17, 2023	2023 World Championships	Belgrade, Serbia
Win	76-18	(India) Abhimanyu	9–2	September 16–17, 2023	2023 World Championships	Belgrade, Serbia
Win	75-18	(Tajikistan) Mustafo Akhmedov	4–0	September 16–17, 2023	2023 World Championships	Belgrade, Serbia
2023 Pan American Championships (gold) at 70 kg
Win	74-18	(Canada) Connor Quinton	Fall	May 3–7, 2023	2023 Pan American Continental Championships	Buenos Aires, Argentina
Win	73-18	(Brazil) Vinicius Joaquim	TF 12–2	May 3–7, 2023	2023 Pan American Continental Championships	Buenos Aires, Argentina
Win	72-18	(Puerto Rico) Francisco Velazquez	TF 10–0	May 3–7, 2023	2023 Pan American Continental Championships	Buenos Aires, Argentina
Win	71-18	(Argentina) Mauricio Lovera	Fall	May 3–7, 2023	2023 Pan American Continental Championships	Buenos Aires, Argentina
2023 US World Team Trials (gold) at 70 kg
Win	70-18	(United States) Tyler Berger	4–3	June 10, 2023	2023 Final X: Newark	(United States) Newark, New Jersey
Win	69-18	(United States) Tyler Berger	11–2	June 10, 2023	2023 Final X: Newark	(United States) Newark, New Jersey
2022 World Championships (silver) at 70 kg
Loss	68-18	(Japan) Taishi Narikuni	TF 0–10	September 15–16, 2022	2022 World Championships	Belgrade, Serbia
Win	68-17	(Georgia (country)) Zurabi Iakobishvili	7–0	September 15–16, 2022	2022 World Championships	Belgrade, Serbia
Win	67-17	(Armenia) Arman Andreasyan	5–0	September 15–16, 2022	2022 World Championships	Belgrade, Serbia
Win	66-17	(Switzerland) Marc Dietsche	Fall	September 15–16, 2022	2022 World Championships	Belgrade, Serbia
Win	65-17	(Germany) Kevin Henkel	TF 10–0	September 15–16, 2022	2022 World Championships	Belgrade, Serbia
2022 Tunis Ranking Series (gold) at 70 kg
Win	64-17	(Kazakhstan) Syrbaz Talgat	TF 10–0	July 18, 2022	2022 Tunis Ranking Series	Tunis, Tunisia
Win	63-17	(Tunisia) Kossai Ajimi	TF 11–0	July 18, 2022	2022 Tunis Ranking Series	Tunis, Tunisia
Win	62-17	(India) Karan Mor	Fall	July 18, 2022	2022 Tunis Ranking Series	Tunis, Tunisia
Win	61-17	(Turkey) Haydar Yavuz	INJ	July 18, 2022	2022 Tunis Ranking Series	Tunis, Tunisia
Win	60-17	(Kazakhstan) Sanzhar Kozhanov	Fall	July 18, 2022	2022 Tunis Ranking Series	Tunis, Tunisia
2022 US World Team Trials (gold) at 70 kg
Win	59-17	(United States) Jordan Oliver	4–3	June 3, 2022	2022 Final X: Stillwater	(United States) Stillwater, Oklahoma
Loss	58-17	(United States) Jordan Oliver	4–5	June 3, 2022	2022 Final X: Stillwater	(United States) Stillwater, Oklahoma
Win	58-16	(United States) Jordan Oliver	8–3	June 3, 2022	2022 Final X: Stillwater	(United States) Stillwater, Oklahoma
Win	57-16	(United States) Alec Pantaleo	5–2	May 21–22, 2022	2022 US World Team Trials Challenge Tournament	(United States) Coralville, Iowa
Win	56-16	(United States) Doug Zapf	4–1	May 21–22, 2022	2022 US World Team Trials Challenge Tournament	(United States) Coralville, Iowa
2022 Dan Kolov & Nikola Petrov (gold) at 70 kg
Win	55-16	(Bulgaria) Ramazan Ramazanov	10–6	February 17–20, 2022	2022 Dan Kolov & Nikola Petrov Tournament	Veliko Tarnovo, Bulgaria
Win	54-16	(Ukraine) Yehor Muradyan	Fall	February 17–20, 2022	2022 Dan Kolov & Nikola Petrov Tournament	Veliko Tarnovo, Bulgaria
Win	53-16	(Switzerland) Marc Dietsche	TF 12–2	February 17–20, 2022	2022 Dan Kolov & Nikola Petrov Tournament	Veliko Tarnovo, Bulgaria
Win	52-16	(Bulgaria) Ivan Stoyanov	8–0	February 17–20, 2022	2022 Dan Kolov & Nikola Petrov Tournament	Veliko Tarnovo, Bulgaria
2021 US World Team Trials (bronze) at 70 kg
Win	51-16	(United States) Tyler Berger	TF 11–0	September 11–12, 2021	2021 US World Team Trials	(United States) Lincoln, Nebraska
Win	50-16	(United States) Alec Pantaleo	FF	September 11–12, 2021	2021 US World Team Trials	(United States) Lincoln, Nebraska
Win	49-16	(United States) Jarrett Jacques	TF 10–0	September 11–12, 2021	2021 US World Team Trials	(United States) Lincoln, Nebraska
Loss	48-16	(United States) Jordan Oliver	2–2	September 11–12, 2021	2021 US World Team Trials	(United States) Lincoln, Nebraska
2020 US Olympic Team Trials DNP at 65 kg
Loss	48-15	(United States) Nick Lee	4–10	April 2, 2021	2020 US Olympic Team Trials	(United States) Fort Worth, Texas
Loss	48-14	(United States) Joey McKenna	5–8	April 2, 2021	2020 US Olympic Team Trials	(United States) Fort Worth, Texas
Win	48-13	(United States) Anthony Ashnault	5–1	April 2, 2021	2020 US Olympic Team Trials	(United States) Fort Worth, Texas
Win	47-13	(United States) Evan Henderson	6–2	February 23, 2021	NLWC V	(United States) State College, Pennsylvania
Win	46-13	(India) Bajrang Punia	6–0	December 22, 2020	NLWC IV	(United States) State College, Pennsylvania
Win	45-13	(United States) Reece Humphrey	TF 10–0	November 24, 2020	NLWC III	(United States) State College, Pennsylvania
Win	44-13	(United States) Alec Pantaleo	3–2	September 19, 2020	NLWC I	(United States) State College, Pennsylvania
2020 Pan American Olympic Qualification (bronze) at 65 kg
Win	43-13	(Dominican Republic) Álbaro Rudesindo	Fall	March 15, 2020	2020 Pan American Olympic Qualification Tournament	Ottawa, Canada
Loss	42-13	(Argentina) Agustín Destribats	Fall	March 15, 2020	2020 Pan American Olympic Qualification Tournament	Ottawa, Canada
Win	42-12	(Colombia) Uber Cuero	TF 10–0	March 15, 2020	2020 Pan American Olympic Qualification Tournament	Ottawa, Canada
Win	41-12	(Puerto Rico) Jose Rodriguez	TF 10–0	March 15, 2020	2020 Pan American Olympic Qualification Tournament	Ottawa, Canada
2020 Matteo Pellicone Ranking Series (bronze) at 65 kg
Win	40-12	(Ukraine) Vasyl Shuptar	Fall	January 15–18, 2020	2020 Matteo Pellicone Ranking Series	Rome, Italy
Win	39-12	(United States) Joey McKenna	10–5	January 15–18, 2020	2020 Matteo Pellicone Ranking Series	Rome, Italy
Loss	38-12	(India) Bajrang Punia	4–5	January 15–18, 2020	2020 Matteo Pellicone Ranking Series	Rome, Italy
2019 Alans International Tournament 7th at 65 kg
Loss	38-11	(Russia) Saiyn Kazyryk	4–6	December 7–9, 2019	2019 Alans International Tournament	Vladikavkaz, Russia
Win	38-10	(Russia) Iulian Gergenov	TF 11–0	December 7–9, 2019	2019 Alans International Tournament	Vladikavkaz, Russia
Win	37-10	(Russia) Inar Ketiia	TF 13–2	December 7–9, 2019	2019 Alans International Tournament	Vladikavkaz, Russia
2019 World Championships 26th at 65 kg
Loss	36-10	(Cuba) Alejandro Valdés	9–10	September 19, 2019	2019 World Championships	Nur-Sultan, Kazakhstan
2019 US World Team Trials (gold) at 65 kg
Win	36-9	(United States) Yianni Diakomihalis	2–1	September 2, 2019	2019 Final X Wrestle-Off: Yianni vs Zain	(United States) Wilkes-Barre, Pennsylvania
2019 Grand Prix Yaşar Doğu 7th at 65 kg
Loss	35-9	(United States) Yianni Diakomihalis	5–9	July 11–14, 2019	2019 Grand Prix Yaşar Doğu	Istanbul, Turkey
NC	35-8	(United States) Yianni Diakomihalis	6–6	June 7–8, 2019	2019 Final X: Rutgers	(United States) New Brunswick, New Jersey
Win	35–8	(United States) Yianni Diakomihalis	10–4	June 7–8, 2019	2019 Final X: Rutgers	(United States) New Brunswick, New Jersey
Win	34–8	(United States) Jordan Oliver	7–6	May 17–19, 2019	2019 US World Team Trials Challenge Tournament	(United States) Raleigh, North Carolina
Win	33–8	(United States) Jordan Oliver	7–6	May 17–19, 2019	2019 US World Team Trials Challenge Tournament	(United States) Raleigh, North Carolina
Win	32–7	(United States) Frank Molinaro	6–1	May 17–19, 2019	2019 US World Team Trials Challenge Tournament	(United States) Raleigh, North Carolina
Win	31–8	(United States) Dean Heil	TF 10–0	May 17–19, 2019	2019 US World Team Trials Challenge Tournament	(United States) Raleigh, North Carolina
2019 US Open (silver) at 65 kg
Loss	30–8	(United States) Yianni Diakomihalis	4–6	April 24–27, 2019	2019 US Open National Championships	(United States) Las Vegas, Nevada
Win	30–7	(United States) Jaydin Eierman	11–3	April 24–27, 2019	2019 US Open National Championships	(United States) Las Vegas, Nevada
Win	29–6	(United States) Jayson Ness	TF 10–0	April 24–27, 2019	2019 US Open National Championships	(United States) Las Vegas, Nevada
Win	28–7	(United States) Mitch McKee	TF 10–0	April 24–27, 2019	2019 US Open National Championships	(United States) Las Vegas, Nevada
Win	27-6	(United States) Tristan Moran	TF 10–0	April 24–27, 2019	2019 US Open National Championships	(United States) Las Vegas, Nevada
Win	26–7	(United States) Peter Lipari	TF 10–0	April 24–27, 2019	2019 US Open National Championships	(United States) Las Vegas, Nevada
2019 World Cup (gold) at 65kg
Win	25–7	(Japan) Daichi Takatani	TF 10–0	March 16–17, 2019	2019 World Cup	Yakutsk, Russia
Win	24–7	(Mongolia) Batmagnai Batchuluun	TF 10–0	March 16–17, 2019	2019 World Cup	Yakutsk, Russia
Win	23–6	(Iran) Morteza Ghiasi	6–1	March 16–17, 2019	2019 World Cup	Yakutsk, Russia
Win	22–7	(Georgia (country)) Amiran Vakhtangashvili	9–2	March 16–17, 2019	2019 World Cup	Yakutsk, Russia
2019 Golden Grand Prix Ivan Yarygin 8th at 65 kg
Loss	21–7	(Russia) Gadzhimurad Rashidov	3–4	January 24–27, 2019	Golden Grand Prix Ivan Yarygin 2019	Krasnoyarsk, Russia
2017 World Championships 11th at 65 kg
Loss	21–6	(Bahrain) Adam Batirov	4–6	August 26, 2017	2017 World Championships	Paris, France
Win	21–5	(Slovenia) David Habat	TF 10–0	August 26, 2017	2017 World Championships	Paris, France
2017 Spain Grand Prix (gold) at 65 kg
Win	20–5	(Iran) Vahid Ahangari	TF 10–0	July 15–16, 2017	2017 Grand Prix of Spain	Madrid, Spain
Win	19–5	(France) Ilman Mukhtarov	6–0	July 15–16, 2017	2017 Grand Prix of Spain	Madrid, Spain
Win	18–5	(France) Maxime Fiquet	TF 11–0	July 15–16, 2017	2017 Grand Prix of Spain	Madrid, Spain
Win	17–5	(Austria) Gabriel Janatsch	4–0	July 15–16, 2017	2017 Grand Prix of Spain	Madrid, Spain
2017 US World Team Trials (gold) at 65 kg
Win	16–5	(United States) Frank Molinaro	7–4	June 10, 2017	2017 US World Team Trials	(United States) Lincoln, Nebraska
Win	15–5	(United States) Frank Molinaro	6–0	June 10, 2017	2017 US World Team Trials	(United States) Lincoln, Nebraska
Loss	14–5	(United States) Frank Molinaro	6–7	June 10, 2017	2017 US World Team Trials	(United States) Lincoln, Nebraska
Win	14–4	(United States) Bernard Futrell	TF 10–0	June 9, 2017	2017 US World Team Trials Challenge Tournament	(United States) Lincoln, Nebraska
Win	13–4	(United States) Nick Dardanes	TF 11–0	June 9, 2017	2017 US World Team Trials Challenge Tournament	(United States) Lincoln, Nebraska
Win	12–4	(United States) Jaydin Eierman	TF 14–2	June 9, 2017	2017 US World Team Trials Challenge Tournament	(United States) Lincoln, Nebraska
2017 US Open (bronze) at 65 kg
Win	11–4	(United States) Jimmy Kennedy	4–3	April 26–29, 2017	2017 US Open National Championships	(United States) Las Vegas, Nevada
Win	10–4	(United States) Evan Henderson	TF 10–0	April 26–29, 2017	2017 US Open National Championships	(United States) Las Vegas, Nevada
Loss	9-4	(United States) Jordan Oliver	3–5	April 26–29, 2017	2017 US Open National Championships	(United States) Las Vegas, Nevada
Win	9–3	(United States) Nick Dardanes	TF 10–0	April 26–29, 2017	2017 US Open National Championships	(United States) Las Vegas, Nevada
Win	8–3	(United States) Koby Reyes	TF 10–0	April 26–29, 2017	2017 US Open National Championships	(United States) Las Vegas, Nevada
c2016 US Olympic Team Trials (bronze) at 65 kg
Win	7–3	(United States) Jimmy Kennedy	2–2	April 9–10, 2016	2016 US Olympic Team Trials	(United States) Iowa City, Iowa
Win	6–3	(United States) Jayson Ness	6–3	April 9–10, 2016	2016 US Olympic Team Trials	(United States) Iowa City, Iowa
Win	5–3	(United States) Jason Chamberlain	7–2	April 9–10, 2016	2016 US Olympic Team Trials	(United States) Iowa City, Iowa
Loss	4–3	(United States) Logan Stieber	6–8	April 9–10, 2016	2016 US Olympic Team Trials	(United States) Iowa City, Iowa
Win	4–2	(United States) James Green	9–2	April 9–10, 2016	2016 US Olympic Team Trials	(United States) Iowa City, Iowa
2015 Dave Schultz Memorial International 4th at 65 kg
Loss	3–2	(Ukraine) Andrey Kvyatkovskyy	4–8	January 29–31, 2015	2015 Dave Schultz Memorial International	(United States) Colorado Springs, Colorado
Win	3–1	(Russia) Murad Nukhadiev	9–2	January 29–31, 2015	2015 Dave Schultz Memorial International	(United States) Colorado Springs, Colorado
Win	2–1	(United States) Evan Henderson	10–7	January 29–31, 2015	2015 Dave Schultz Memorial International	(United States) Colorado Springs, Colorado
Loss	1–1	(United States) Jordan Oliver	2–6	January 29–31, 2015	2015 Dave Schultz Memorial International	(United States) Colorado Springs, Colorado
Win	1–0	(United States) Michael Mangrum	7–6	January 29–31, 2015	2015 Dave Schultz Memorial International	(United States) Colorado Springs, Colorado

== NCAA record ==
NCAA Championships Matches
Res.	Record	Opponent	Score	Date	Event
2018 NCAA Championships (gold) at 149 lbs
Win	18-2	Ronald Perry	6-2	March 15–17, 2018	2018 NCAA Division I Wrestling Championships
Win	17-2	Troy Heilmann	10-4	March 15–17, 2018	2018 NCAA Division I Wrestling Championships
Win	16-2	Boo Lewallen	TF 20-2	March 15–17, 2018	2018 NCAA Division I Wrestling Championships
Win	15-2	Alfred Bannister	Fall	March 15–17, 2018	2018 NCAA Division I Wrestling Championships
Win	14-2	Kyle Springer	TF 16-1	March 15–17, 2018	2018 NCAA Division I Wrestling Championships
2017 NCAA Championships (gold) at 149 lbs
Win	13–2	Lavion Mayes	TF 18-2	March 16–18, 2017	2017 NCAA Division I Wrestling Championships
Win	13–2	Brandon Sorensen	Fall	March 16–18, 2017	2017 NCAA Division I Wrestling Championships
Win	12–2	Alex Kocer	TF 19-2	March 16–18, 2017	2017 NCAA Division I Wrestling Championships
Win	11–2	Jordan Laster	TF 16-0	March 16–18, 2017	2017 NCAA Division I Wrestling Championships
Win	10–2	Joshua Maruca	TF 19-2	March 16–18, 2017	2017 NCAA Division I Wrestling Championships
2016 NCAA Championships (gold) at 149 lbs
Win	9–2	Brandon Sorensen	MD 10-1	March 17–19, 2016	2016 NCAA Division I Wrestling Championships
Win	8-2	Alec Pantaleo	Fall	March 17–19, 2016	2016 NCAA Division I Wrestling Championships
Win	7-2	Justin Oliver	Fall	March 17–19, 2016	2016 NCAA Division I Wrestling Championships
Win	5-2	Pat Lugo	Fall	March 17–19, 2016	2016 NCAA Division I Wrestling Championships
Win	4-2	Coleman Hammond	TF 21-6	March 17–19, 2016	2016 NCAA Division I Wrestling Championships
2014 NCAA Championships 5th at 141 lbs
Loss	3-2	Mitchell Port	TB 1-3	March 21, 2014	2014 NCAA Division I Wrestling Championships
Loss	3-1	Logan Stieber	3-7	March 21, 2014	2014 NCAA Division I Wrestling Championships
Win	3–0	Joey Lazor	5-2	March 21, 2014	2014 NCAA Division I Wrestling Championships
Win	2–0	Edgar Bright	3-0	March 21, 2014	2014 NCAA Division I Wrestling Championships
Win	1–0	Ugi Khishignyam	5-0	March 21, 2014	2014 NCAA Division I Wrestling Championships

=== Stats ===
Season	Year	School	Rank	Weigh Class	Record	Win	Bonus
2018	Senior	Penn State University	#1 (1st)	149	31-0	100.00%	83.87%
2017	Junior	Penn State University	#1 (1st)	149	28-0	100.00%	89.29%
2016	Sophomore	Penn State University	#1 (1st)	149	34-0	100.00%	88.57%
2014	Freshman	Penn State University	#4 (5th)	141	33-3	89.47%	39.47%
Career					126-3	96.37%	75.30%

== Coaching career ==
Retherford was hired as coach of the Nittany Lion Wrestling Club on August 26, 2024.

== Awards and honors ==
2020

- (bronze) Pan American Wrestling Olympic Qualification (65 kg)
- (bronze) Matteo Pellicone Ranking Series (65 kg)

2019

- (gold) World Cup (65 kg)
- (gold) US World Team Trials (65 kg)
- (silver) U.S Open Championship (65 kg)

2018

- (gold) NCAA Division I (149 lbs)
- (gold) Big Ten Conference (149 lbs)
- Dan Hodge Trophy winner
- NCAA Most Dominant wrestler
- Big Ten Wrestler of the Year

2017

- (gold) US World Team Trials (65 kg)
- (bronze) U.S Open Championship (65 kg)
- (gold) Spain Grand Prix
- (gold) NCAA Division I (149 lbs)
- (gold) Big Ten Conference (149 lbs)
- Dan Hodge Trophy winner
- NCAA Division I Championships Outstanding Wrestler
- NCAA Most Dominant wrestler
- Big Ten Championships Outstanding Wrestler

2016

- (bronze) US Olympic Team Trials Challenge Tournament (65 kg)
- (gold) NCAA Division I (149 lbs)
- (gold) Big Ten Conference (149 lbs)
- NCAA Most Dominant wrestler
- Penn State Male Athlete of the Year
- Big Ten Wrestler of the Year

2014

- NCAA Division I All-American (141 lbs)
- (silver) Big Ten Conference (141 lbs)

== See also ==
- List of Pennsylvania State University Olympians
- United States results in men's freestyle wrestling
