= 2023 European Wrestling Championships – Men's freestyle 70 kg =

Wrestling competition

Men's freestyle 70 kg at the 2023 European Wrestling Championships
- Venue: Arena Zagreb
- Location: Zagreb, Croatia
- Dates: 17-18 April
- Competitors: 18

Medalists
| gold medal | Haji Aliyev | Azerbaijan |
| silver medal | Ramazan Ramazanov | Bulgaria |
| bronze medal | Vasile Diacon | Moldova |
| bronze medal | Ihor Nykyforuk | Ukraine |

The Men's Freestyle 70 kg is a competition featured at the 2023 European Wrestling Championships, and was held in Zagreb, Croatia on April 17 and 18.

== Results ==
Legend

- F — Won by fall
- WO — Won by walkover

Round of 16
Daniel Chomanič (SVK) | 0
Vasile Diacon (MDA) | 11
~~Dániel Antal (HUN)~~
Kevin Henkel (GER) | WO
Haji Aliyev (AZE) | 12
Gianluca Talamo (ITA) | 1
Servet Coşkun (TUR) | 1
Giorgi Elbakidze (GEO) | 3
Marc Dietsche (SUI) | 0
Ihor Nykyforuk (UKR) | 10
Fati Vejseli (MKD) | 9
Patryk Ołenczyn (POL) | 11

Quarterfinals
Arman Andreasyan (ARM) | 1
Vasile Diacon (MDA) | 2
Kevin Henkel (GER) | 0
Haji Aliyev (AZE) | 4
Giorgi Elbakidze (GEO) | 3
Ihor Nykyforuk (UKR) | 14
Patryk Ołenczyn (POL) | 4
Ramazan Ramazanov (BUL) | 11^{F}

Semifinals
Vasile Diacon (MDA) | 1
Haji Aliyev (AZE) | 4
Ihor Nykyforuk (UKR) | 4
Ramazan Ramazanov (BUL) | 14

Final
Haji Aliyev (AZE) | 10
Ramazan Ramazanov (BUL) | 3

Repechage round 1
Gianluca Talamo (ITA) | 3
Kevin Henkel (GER) | 13

Bronze medal match
Kevin Henkel (GER) | 2
Vasile Diacon (MDA) | 7
Patryk Ołenczyn (POL) | 1
Ihor Nykyforuk (UKR) | 6^{F}

== Final standing ==
| Rank | Athlete |
|---|---|
| 1st place, gold medalist(s) | Haji Aliyev (AZE) |
| 2nd place, silver medalist(s) | Ramazan Ramazanov (BUL) |
| 3rd place, bronze medalist(s) | Vasile Diacon (MDA) |
| 3rd place, bronze medalist(s) | Ihor Nykyforuk (UKR) |
| 5 | Kevin Henkel (GER) |
| 5 | Patryk Ołenczyn (POL) |
| 7 | Giorgi Elbakidze (GEO) |
| 8 | Gianluca Talamo (ITA) |
| 9 | Fati Vejseli (MKD) |
| 10 | Arman Andreasyan (ARM) |
| 11 | Servet Coşkun (TUR) |
| 12 | Marc Dietsche (SUI) |
| 13 | Daniel Chomanič (SVK) |
| — | Dániel Antal (HUN) |
