= 2022 World Wrestling Championships – Men's freestyle 70 kg =

World Wrestling competitions

Men's freestyle 70 kg at the 2022 World Championships
- Venue: Štark Arena
- Dates: 15–16 September 2022
- Competitors: 28 from 28 nations

Medalists
gold medal	Taishi Narikuni	Japan
silver medal	Zain Retherford	United States
bronze medal	Ernazar Akmataliev	Kyrgyzstan
bronze medal	Zurabi Iakobishvili	Georgia

The men's freestyle 70 kilograms was a competition featured at the 2022 World Wrestling Championships, and was held in Belgrade, Serbia on 15 and 16 September 2022.

This freestyle wrestling competition consists of a single-elimination tournament, with a repechage used to determine the winner of two bronze medals. The two finalists face off for gold and silver medals. Each wrestler who loses to one of the two finalists moves into the repechage, culminating in a pair of bronze medal matches featuring the semifinal losers each facing the remaining repechage opponent from their half of the bracket.

== Results ==
Legend

- F — Won by fall
- WO — Won by walkover

=== Final ===
Final
Taishi Narikuni (JPN)	10
Zain Retherford (USA)	0

=== Top half ===
Round of 32
Maxim Saculțan (MDA)	7
Vincent De Marinis (CAN)	0
Ramazan Ramazanov (BUL)	7
Fati Vejseli (MKD)	4
Dániel Antal (HUN)	4
Bacar Ndum (GBS)	8
~~Amir Mohammad Yazdani (IRI)~~
Josh Finesilver (ISR)	WO
Anthony Wesley (CPV)	0
Ilyas Bekbulatov (UZB)	11
Taishi Narikuni (JPN)	6
Naveen Malik (IND)	1

Round of 16
Ernazar Akmataliev (KGZ)	14
Maxim Saculțan (MDA)	2
Ramazan Ramazanov (BUL)	13
Bacar Ndum (GBS)	2
Josh Finesilver (ISR)	0
Ilyas Bekbulatov (UZB)	10
Taishi Narikuni (JPN)	11^{F}
Syrbaz Talgat (KAZ)	4

Quarterfinals
Ernazar Akmataliev (KGZ)	11
Ramazan Ramazanov (BUL)	0
Ilyas Bekbulatov (UZB)	0
Taishi Narikuni (JPN)	11

Semifinals
Ernazar Akmataliev (KGZ)	10
Taishi Narikuni (JPN)	11

=== Bottom half ===
Round of 32
Elie Djekoundakom (CHA)	0
Gianluca Talamo (ITA)	10
Marc Dietsche (SUI)	4
Daniel Chomanič (SVK)	1
Kevin Henkel (GER)	0
Zain Retherford (USA)	10
Servet Coşkun (TUR)	6
Wurenibai Nuerlanbieke (CHN)	6
Jeong Yong-seok (KOR)	7
Oleksii Boruta (UKR)	4
Enkhtuyaagiin Temüülen (MGL)	3
Joshgun Azimov (AZE)	3

Round of 16
Arman Andreasyan (ARM)	6
Gianluca Talamo (ITA)	2
Marc Dietsche (SUI)	0
Zain Retherford (USA)	4^{F}
Servet Coşkun (TUR)	7
Jeong Yong-seok (KOR)	3
Enkhtuyaagiin Temüülen (MGL)	1
Zurabi Iakobishvili (GEO)	2

Quarterfinals
Arman Andreasyan (ARM)	0
Zain Retherford (USA)	5
Servet Coşkun (TUR)	0
Zurabi Iakobishvili (GEO)	2

Semifinals
Zain Retherford (USA)	7
Zurabi Iakobishvili (GEO)	0

=== Repechage ===
Repechage round 1
Naveen Malik (IND)	11
Syrbaz Talgat (KAZ)	3
Kevin Henkel (GER)	6
Marc Dietsche (SUI)	2

Repechage round 2
Naveen Malik (IND)	WO
~~Ilyas Bekbulatov (UZB)~~
Kevin Henkel (GER)	1
Arman Andreasyan (ARM)	3

Bronze medals
Naveen Malik (IND)	1
Ernazar Akmataliev (KGZ)	4
Arman Andreasyan (ARM)	5
Zurabi Iakobishvili (GEO)	5

== Final standing ==
Rank	Athlete
1st place, gold medalist(s)	Taishi Narikuni (JPN)
2nd place, silver medalist(s)	Zain Retherford (USA)
3rd place, bronze medalist(s)	Ernazar Akmataliev (KGZ)
3rd place, bronze medalist(s)	Zurabi Iakobishvili (GEO)
5	Naveen Malik (IND)
5	Arman Andreasyan (ARM)
7	Ramazan Ramazanov (BUL)
8	Servet Coşkun (TUR)
9	Gianluca Talamo (ITA)
10	Josh Finesilver (ISR)
11	Jeong Yong-seok (KOR)
12	Bacar Ndum (GBS)
13	Maxim Saculțan (MDA)
14	Kevin Henkel (GER)
15	Marc Dietsche (SUI)
16	Enkhtuyaagiin Temüülen (MGL)
17	Syrbaz Talgat (KAZ)
18	Wurenibai Nuerlanbieke (CHN)
19	Fati Vejseli (MKD)
20	Oleksii Boruta (UKR)
21	Dániel Antal (HUN)
22	Joshgun Azimov (AZE)
23	Daniel Chomanič (SVK)
24	Vincent De Marinis (CAN)
25	Elie Djekoundakom (CHA)
26	Anthony Wesley (CPV)
—	Amir Mohammad Yazdani (IRI)
—	Ilyas Bekbulatov (UZB)
