= 2014 European Wrestling Championships – Men's freestyle 65 kg =

Wrestling competitions

The men's freestyle 97 kg is a competition featured at the 2014 European Wrestling Championships, and was held in Vantaa, Finland on 1 April.

== Medalists ==
Gold	Magomed Kurbanaliev; Russia
Silver	Servet Coşkun; Turkey
Bronze	Borislav Novachkov; Bulgaria
Bronze	Konstantine Khabalashvili; Georgia

== Results ==
Legend

- F — Won by fall

=== Final ===
Final
Servet Coşkun (TUR)	0
Magomed Kurbanaliev (RUS)	10

=== Top half ===
Round of 32

Round of 16
Toghrul Asgarov (AZE)	5
Borislav Novachkov (BUL)	13
Elton Azuni (ALB)	1
George Bucur (ROU)	12
Steven Graf (SUI)	1
Mykola Bolotnjuk (SVK)	11
Servet Coşkun (TUR)	10
Norbert Lukács (HUN)	2

Quarterfinals
Borislav Novachkov (BUL)	4
George Bucur (ROU)	3
Mykola Bolotnjuk (SVK)	0
Servet Coşkun (TUR)	10

Semifinals
Borislav Novachkov (BUL)	3
Servet Coşkun (TUR)	6

=== Bottom half ===
Round of 32
Konstantine Khabalashvili (GEO)	10
Angelo Costa (ITA)	0
Magomed Kurbanaliev (RUS)	13
Arkadiusz Szeja (POL)	2
Martin Daum (GER)	7
Maxime Fiquet (FRA)	2
Andrii Kviatkovskyi (UKR)	8
Artur Baghbasaryan (ARM)	3

Round of 16
Igor Gertner (ISR)	2
Azamat Nurykau (BLR)	7
Maximilian Ausserleitner (AUT)	2
Vladimir Gotişan (MDA)	12
Konstantine Khabalashvili (GEO)	0
Magomed Kurbanaliev (RUS)	10
Martin Daum (GER)	6
Andrii Kviatkovskyi (UKR)	3

Quarterfinals
Azamat Nurykau (BLR)	7^{F}
Vladimir Gotişan (MDA)	6
Magomed Kurbanaliev (RUS)	10^{F}
Martin Daum (GER)	0

Semifinals
Azamat Nurykau (BLR)	0
Magomed Kurbanaliev (RUS)	8

=== Repechage ===
Repechage round 1
Arkadiusz Szeja (POL)	1
Konstantine Khabalashvili (GEO)	11

Repechage round 2
Norbert Lukács (HUN)	0
Mykola Bolotnjuk (SVK)	9
Martin Daum (GER)	2
Konstantine Khabalashvili (GEO)	13

Bronze medals
Mykola Bolotnjuk (SVK)	0
Borislav Novachkov (BUL)	7^{F}
Konstantine Khabalashvili (GEO)	11
Azamat Nurykau (BLR)	0
