= Zabolotiv =

Rural locality in Ivano-Frankivsk Oblast, Ukraine

Zabolotiv Заболотів
- Rural settlement
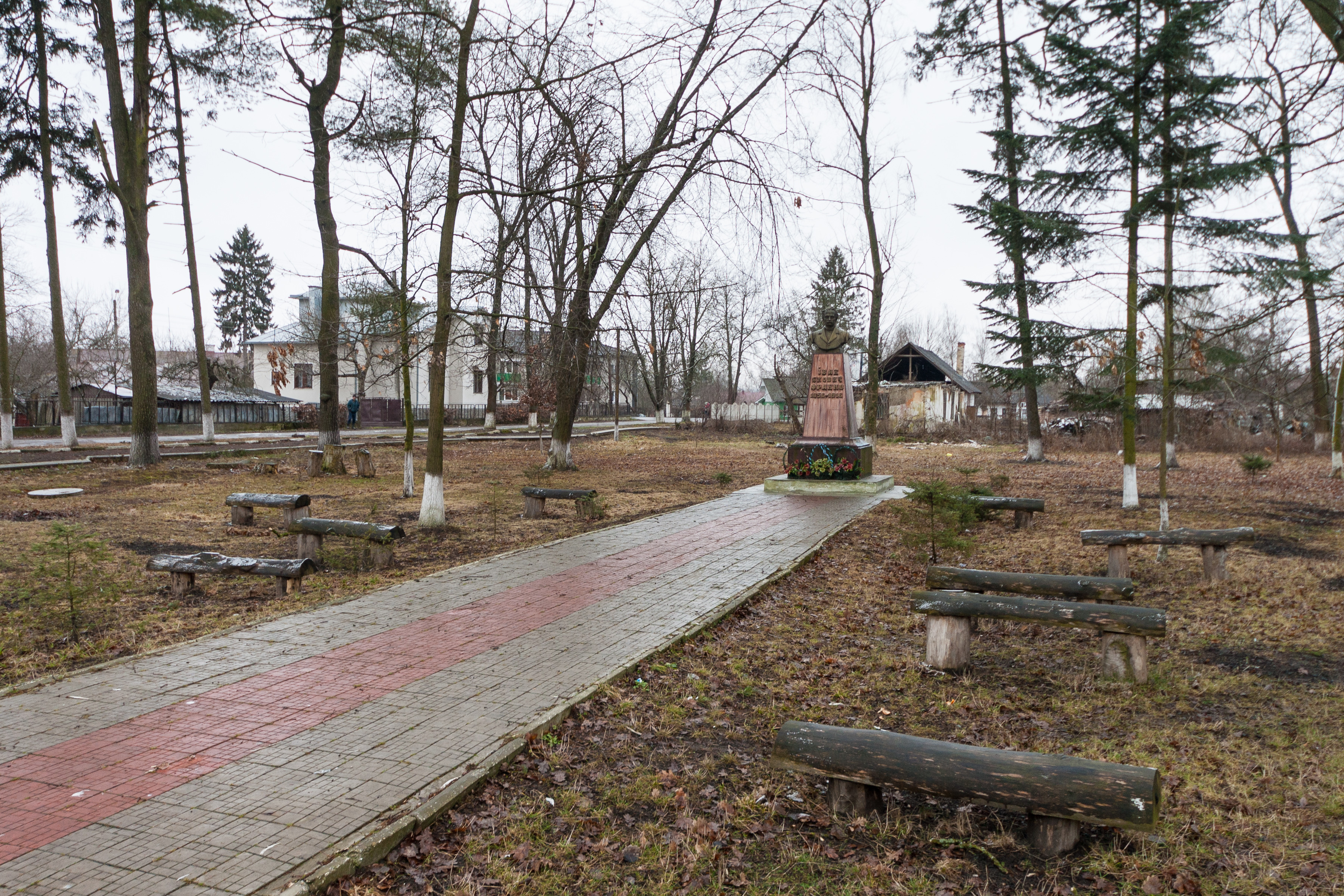
- Monument to Ivan Franko

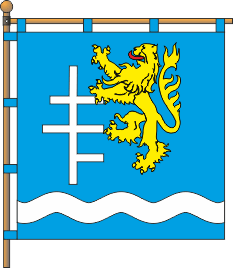
- Flag Coat of arms

- Location within Ukraine Location within Ivano-Frankivsk Oblast
- Coordinates: 48°28′10″N 25°17′00″E
- Country: Ukraine
- Oblast: Ivano-Frankivsk Oblast
- Raion: Kolomyia Raion
- First mentioned: 1455
- Urban-type settlement: 1940

Area
  - Total: 1.91 km^{2} (0.74 sq mi)

Population (2022)
  - Total: 3,500
  - Density: 1,800/km^{2} (4,700/sq mi)
- Postal code: 78315,78316
- Area code: +380 3476

Zabolotiv (Ukrainian: Заболотів; Polish: Zabłotów; Yiddish: זאַבלאָטאָוו) is a rural settlement in Kolomyia Raion, Ivano-Frankivsk Oblast, western Ukraine, located upon the Prut river in the historic region of Pokuttia. It hosts the administration of Zabolotiv settlement hromada, one of the hromadas of Ukraine. Population: 3,914 (2022 estimate). In 2001, the population was 4,129.

== History ==
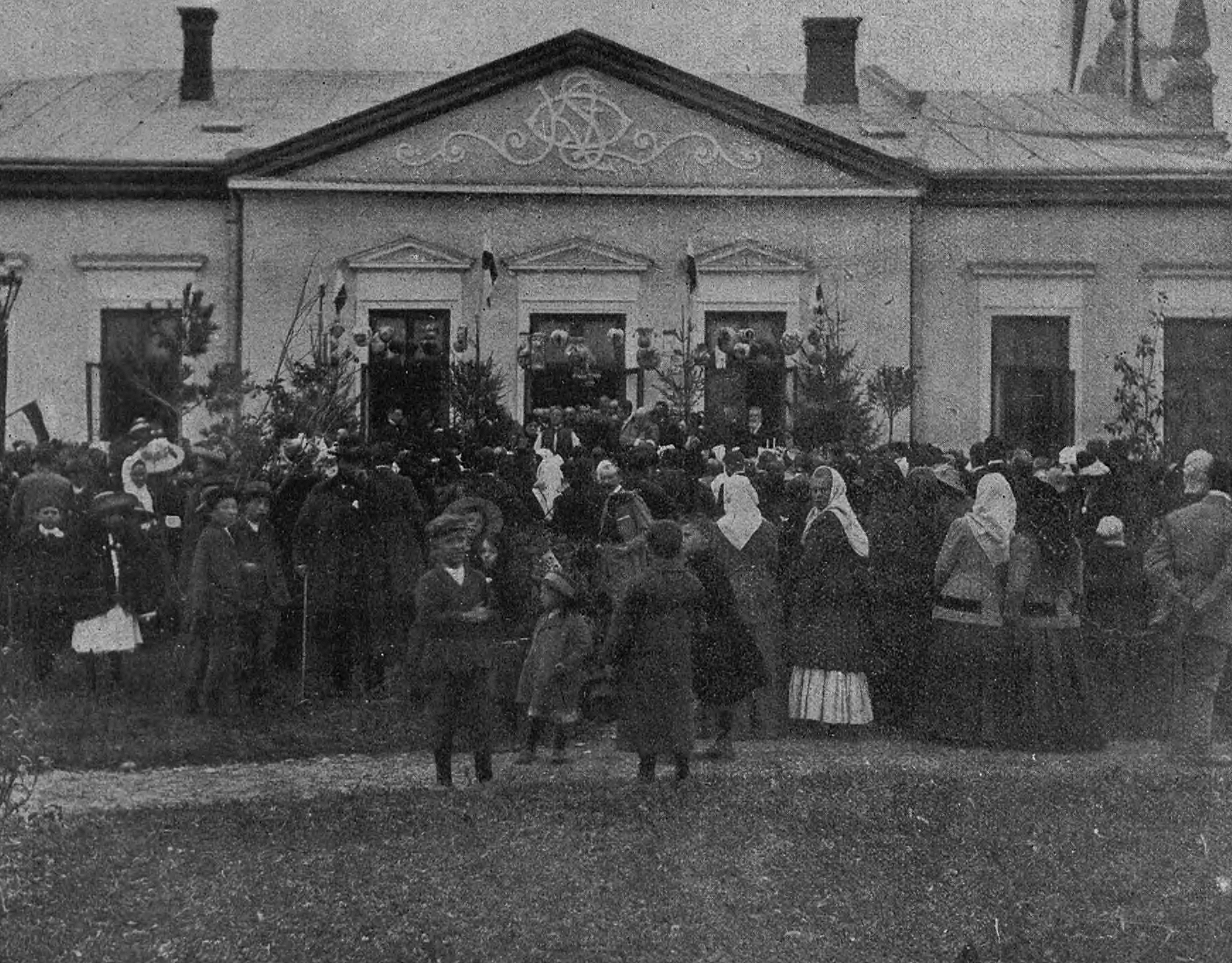
Opening of the seat of the Sokół Polish Gymnastic Society in 1913

The town was established in 1662 by Andrzej Potocki, a Polish nobleman. On May 7, 1662, Potocki issued a declaration establishing the city with Magdeburg rights. However, the city and its rights were not officially recognized by the Polish Crown until August 14, 1663, when King John Casimir finally approved it. The town was originally founded as a fortress to protect the Polish-Lithuanian Commonwealth from Tatar invasions and to defend the multi-ethnic population of the region. It was built next to the older villages of Zabolotiv (known since 1435) and Knyahynyn (known since 1449). By 1672, the wooden fortress had been rebuilt using stone, brick and mortar. In the same year, Jews were granted the right to become permanent residents of the town. So in summary, while the area had older settlements, the town of Zabolotiv itself was officially founded in 1662-1663 as a new fortress town by the Polish nobility.

After the three partitions of Poland in the late eighteenth century the town was part of the Austro-Hungarian Empire. Since 1790, a growing Jewish community became an important part of local life. At the beginning of the 20th century, antisemitic unrest culminated in the first pogrom in Zabolotiv in 1903. In 1919 the town reverted to Poland. Later, the Germans exterminated one part of the Jewish population while others managed to flee to the United States and Israel: Circa 1,200 Jews from the Zabolotiv area were believed to be killed during the Second World War. After 1945 the town became part of the Soviet republic of Ukraine. In July 2023, local Orthodox and Catholic Christian communities served a memorial service for forgiveness for the persecution and extermination of local Jewish community.

== Administrative status ==
Under the Soviet rule Zabolotiv served as a district centre of Stanislaviv Oblast. Until 18 July 2020, it belonged to Sniatyn Raion. The raion was abolished in July 2020 as part of the administrative reform of Ukraine, which reduced the number of raions of Ivano-Frankivsk Oblast to six. The area of Sniatyn Raion was merged into Kolomyia Raion.

Until 26 January 2024, Zabolotiv was designated urban-type settlement. On this day, a new law entered into force which abolished this status, and Zabolotiv became a rural settlement.

== Demographics ==
Historical population
Year	Pop.	±%
1921	3,583	—
1931	6,541	+82.6%
2022	3,914	−40.2%

== Economy ==
Zabolotiv has been historically known as a centre of tobacco production.

== Notable people ==
- Otto M. Nikodym (1887–1974), Polish mathematician
- Svitlana Onyshchuk (born 1984), Ukrainian government official
- Manes Sperber (1905–1984), Austrian-French novelist and psychologist
- Charles Thau (1921–1995), Jewish partisan and Red Army soldier
