= 2022 U23 World Wrestling Championships – Men's freestyle 70 kg =

Wrestling competitions

Men's freestyle 70 kg at the 2022 U23 World Championships
- Venue: Pontevedra Municipal Sports Hall
- Dates: 21–22 October
- Competitors: 20 from 20 nations

Medalists
gold medal	Giorgi Elbakidze	Georgia
silver medal	Amir Mohammad Yazdani	Iran
bronze medal	Kota Takahashi	Japan
bronze medal	Kanan Heybatov	Azerbaijan

The men's freestyle 70 kg is a competition featured at the 2022 U23 World Wrestling Championships, and was held in Pontevedra, Spain on 21 and 22 October 2022. The qualification rounds were held on 20 October while medal matches were held on the 2nd day of the competition. A total of 20 wrestlers competed in this event, limited to athletes whose body weight was less than 70 kilograms.

This freestyle wrestling competition consists of a single-elimination tournament, with a repechage used to determine the winner of two bronze medals. The two finalists face off for gold and silver medals. Each wrestler who loses to one of the two finalists moves into the repechage, culminating in a pair of bronze medal matches featuring the semifinal losers each facing the remaining repechage opponent from their half of the bracket.

== Results ==
Legend

- F — Won by fall
- WO — Won by walkover

=== Final ===
Final
Amir Mohammad Yazdani (IRI)	4
Giorgi Elbakidze (GEO)	8

=== Top half ===
Round of 32
Jorge Gatica (CHI)	0
Tobias Portmann (SUI)	11
Kota Takahashi (JPN)	7
Arman Andreasyan (ARM)	3

Round of 16
Yahya Thomas (USA)	2
Emmanuel Olapade (CAN)	0
Tobias Portmann (SUI)	8
Ion Marcu (MDA)	6
Ömer Faruk Çayır (TUR)	0
Kota Takahashi (JPN)	10
Syrbaz Talgat (KAZ)	5
Amir Mohammad Yazdani (IRI)	15

Quarterfinals
Yahya Thomas (USA)	4
Tobias Portmann (SUI)	1
Kota Takahashi (JPN)	7
Amir Mohammad Yazdani (IRI)	17

Semifinals
Yahya Thomas (USA)	2
Amir Mohammad Yazdani (IRI)	4

=== Bottom half ===
Round of 32
Kanan Heybatov (AZE)	8
Marwane Yezza (FRA)	1
Ramon Geršak-Pérez (ESP)	0
Ihor Nykyforuk (UKR)	10

Round of 16
Giorgi Elbakidze (GEO)	10
Lahiru Waduge (SRI)	0
Kanan Heybatov (AZE)	4
Shamil Ustaev (GER)	4
Gianluca Coletti (ITA)	1
Ihor Nykyforuk (UKR)	12
Orozobek Toktomambetov (KGZ)	6
Ștefan Coman (ROU)	1

Quarterfinals
Giorgi Elbakidze (GEO)	5
Kanan Heybatov (AZE)	4
Ihor Nykyforuk (UKR)	4
Orozobek Toktomambetov (KGZ)	5

Semifinals
Giorgi Elbakidze (GEO)	10
Orozobek Toktomambetov (KGZ)	0

=== Repechage ===
Repechage round 2
Syrbaz Talgat (KAZ)	1
Kota Takahashi (JPN)	3
~~Lahiru Waduge (SRI)~~
Kanan Heybatov (AZE)	WO

Bronze medals
Kota Takahashi (JPN)	4
Yahya Thomas (USA)	0
Kanan Heybatov (AZE)	8
Orozobek Toktomambetov (KGZ)	5

== Final standing ==
Rank	Athlete
1st place, gold medalist(s)	Giorgi Elbakidze (GEO)
2nd place, silver medalist(s)	Amir Mohammad Yazdani (IRI)
3rd place, bronze medalist(s)	Kota Takahashi (JPN)
3rd place, bronze medalist(s)	Kanan Heybatov (AZE)
5	Yahya Thomas (USA)
5	Orozobek Toktomambetov (KGZ)
7	Ihor Nykyforuk (UKR)
8	Tobias Portmann (SUI)
9	Syrbaz Talgat (KAZ)
10	Ion Marcu (MDA)
11	Shamil Ustaev (GER)
12	Arman Andreasyan (ARM)
13	Stefan Coman (ROU)
14	Marwane Yezza (FRA)
15	Gianluca Coletti (ITA)
16	Emmanuel Olapade (CAN)
17	Ömer Faruk Çayır (TUR)
18	Ramon Geršak-Pérez (ESP)
19	Jorge Gatica (CHI)
—	Lahiru Waduge (SRI)
