= Sniatyn Raion =

Former subdivision of Ivano-Frankivsk Oblast, Ukraine

Sniatyn Raion Снятинський район
- Raion
- Sniatynskyi raion
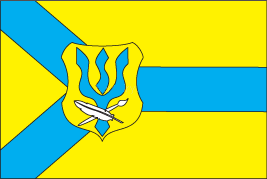
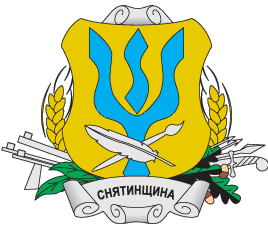
- Flag Coat of arms

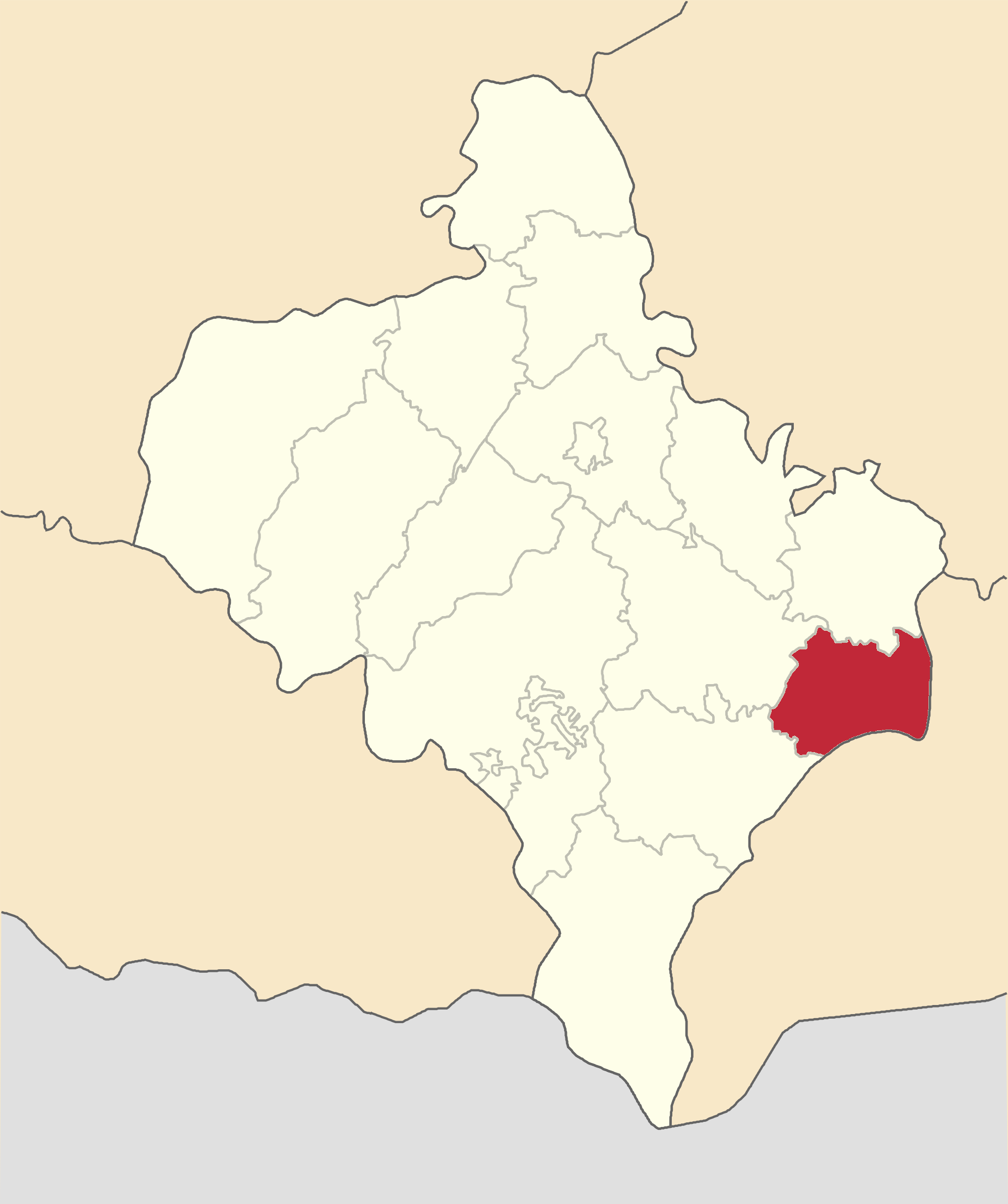
- Coordinates: 48°28′35″N 25°24′43″E
- Country: Ukraine
- Region: Ivano-Frankivsk Oblast
- Disestablished: 18 July 2020
- Subdivisions: List: — city councils; — settlement councils; — rural councils; Number of localities: — cities; — urban-type settlements; — villages; — rural settlements

Population (2020)
  - Total: 63,545
- Time zone: UTC+02:00 (EET)
  - Summer (DST): UTC+03:00 (EEST)
- Postal index: 78300
- Area code: +380

Sniatyn Raion (Ukrainian: Снятинський район, romanized: Snjatyns'kyj rajon) was a raion (district) of Ivano-Frankivsk Oblast (province) of Ukraine. The city of Sniatyn was the administrative center of the raion. The raion was abolished on 18 July 2020 as part of the administrative reform of Ukraine, which reduced the number of raions of Ivano-Frankivsk Oblast Oblast to six. The area of Sniatyn Raion was merged into Kolomyia Raion. The last estimate of the raion population was 63,545 (2020 est.).

== Subdivisions ==
At the time of disestablishment, the raion consisted of two hromadas:

- Sniatyn urban hromada with the administration in Sniatyn;
- Zabolotiv settlement hromada with the administration in the urban-type settlement of Zabolotiv.

== Notable residents ==
- Bohdana Frolyak, composer
- Nicholas Hryhorczuk
