= Triitsia, Ivano-Frankivsk Oblast =

Urban locality in Ivano-Frankivsk Oblast, Ukraine

Triitsia Трійця
- Village
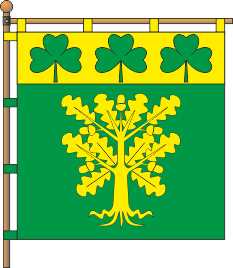
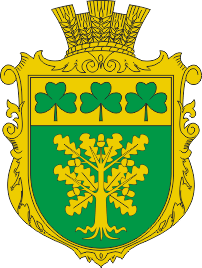
- Flag Coat of arms

- Location within Ivano-Frankivsk Oblast Location within Ukraine
- Coordinates: 48°26′41″N 25°12′39″E
- Country: Ukraine
- Oblast: Ivano-Frankivsk Oblast
- Raion: Kolomyia Raion

Area
  - Total: 247 km^{2} (95 sq mi)

Population (2021)
  - Total: 1,711
  - Density: 7,684/km^{2} (19,900/sq mi)
- Postal code: 78350

Triitsia (Ukrainian: Трійця; until 2025 Troitsia) is a village in Kolomyia Raion (district) of Ivano-Frankivsk Oblast (region), Ukraine. It is located in the southern part of Kolomyia Raion and lies between the villages of Hanniv, Korosty, and Tsutsuly. Troitsia belongs to Zabolotiv settlement hromada, one of the hromadas of Ukraine.

Till the administrative reform of 2020, the village was part of Sniatyn Raion.

The river Horochna, a tributary to the river Prut, flows through the village. Ivankiv zakaznik (nature reserve) lies in the village. Lesser butterfly-orchid, martagon lily, and wild garlic, all of which are listed in the Red Data Book of Ukraine, may be found there.
