= 2021 U23 World Wrestling Championships – Men's freestyle 70 kg =

The men's freestyle 70 kilograms is a competition featured at the 2021 U23 World Wrestling Championships, and was held in Belgrade, Serbia on 5 and 6 November.

== Medalists ==
Gold	Ernazar Akmataliev; Kyrgyzstan
Silver	Vazgen Tevanyan; Armenia
Bronze	Ali Akbar Fazli; Iran
Bronze	Nicolai Grahmez; Moldova

== Results ==
Legend

- F — Won by fall
- WO — Won by walkover

=== Final ===
Final
Ernazar Akmataliev (KGZ)	10
Vazgen Tevanyan (ARM)	2

=== Top half ===
Round of 32
Murad Evloev (AZE)	6
Denis Borohan (UKR)	1
Giorgi Elbakidze (GEO)	12
Naveen Malik (IND)	1
Boldbaataryn Sunduijadamba (MGL)	4^{F}
Daniil Amelyanchyk (BLR)	0
Raul Zarbaliev (ISR)	2
Mustafo Akhmedov (TJK)	9

Round of 16
Ali Akbar Fazli (IRI)	WO
~~Bacar Midana (GBS)~~
Christos Christoforidis (GRE)	2
Ernazar Akmataliev (KGZ)	12
Murad Evloev (AZE)	12^{F}
Giorgi Elbakidze (GEO)	3
Boldbaataryn Sunduijadamba (MGL)	1
Mustafo Akhmedov (TJK)	5^{F}

Quarterfinals
Ali Akbar Fazli (IRI)	6
Ernazar Akmataliev (KGZ)	10
Murad Evloev (AZE)	3
Mustafo Akhmedov (TJK)	0

Semifinals
Ernazar Akmataliev (KGZ)	12
Murad Evloev (AZE)	8

=== Bottom half ===
Round of 32
Botond Gulyás (HUN)	2
Norbert Molnos (ROU)	11
Daniel Chomanič (SVK)	3
Nicolai Grahmez (MDA)	10
Tobias Portmann (SUI)	0
Syrbaz Talgat (KAZ)	10
Rezuan Kazharov (RUS)	10
Abdelkader Ikkal (ALG)	0
Trystan Kato (CAN)	0
Sergio Godoy (ECU)	10
Cüneyt Budak (TUR)	10
Brock Mauller (USA)	4
Begijon Kuldashev (UZB)	10
Elmaz Kryeziu (ALB)	0
Vazgen Tevanyan (ARM)	3
Shamil Ustaev (GER)	1

Round of 16
Norbert Molnos (ROU)	0
Nicolai Grahmez (MDA)	10
Syrbaz Talgat (KAZ)	8
Rezuan Kazharov (RUS)	10
Sergio Godoy (ECU)	0
Cüneyt Budak (TUR)	11
Begijon Kuldashev (UZB)	2
Vazgen Tevanyan (ARM)	11

Quarterfinals
Nicolai Grahmez (MDA)	9
Rezuan Kazharov (RUS)	4
Cüneyt Budak (TUR)	4
Vazgen Tevanyan (ARM)	5

Semifinals
Nicolai Grahmez (MDA)	4
Vazgen Tevanyan (ARM)	5

=== Repechage ===
Repechage round 1
Shamil Ustaev (GER)	1
Begijon Kuldashev (UZB)	6

Repechage round 2
Christos Christoforidis (GRE)	0
Ali Akbar Fazli (IRI)	10
Begijon Kuldashev (UZB)	3
Cüneyt Budak (TUR)	8

Bronze medals
Ali Akbar Fazli (IRI)	5
Murad Evloev (AZE)	4
Cüneyt Budak (TUR)	2
Nicolai Grahmez (MDA)	5
