= Ramazan Ramazanov (wrestler) =

Bulgarian freestyle wrestler

Personal information
- Full name: Ramazan Eldarovich Ramazanov
- Nationality: Dagestan
- Born: Рамазан Эльдарович Рамазанов; 15 February 1995 (age 31) Khasavyurt, Dagestan, Russia
- Height: 1.72 m (5 ft 8 in)
- Weight: 70 kg (150 lb; 11 st)

Sport
- Country: Russia (2012–2019); Bulgaria (2020–present)
- Sport: Amateur wrestling
- Weight class: 70 kg
- Event: Freestyle

Achievements and titles
- World finals: (bronze) (2023)
- Regional finals: (silver) (2023) (bronze) (2022)
Medal record
Men's freestyle wrestling
Representing Bulgaria
World Championships
Bronze medal – third place	2023 Belgrade	70 kg
European Championships
Silver medal – second place	2023 Zagreb	70 kg
Bronze medal – third place	2022 Budapest	70 kg
Bronze medal – third place	2024 Bucharest	70 kg
Dan Kolov & Nikola Petrov Tournament
Gold medal – first place	2023 Sofia	70 kg
Gold medal – first place	2024 Sofia	74 kg
Silver medal – second place	2022 Veliko Tarnovo	70 kg
Yasar Dogu Tournament
Silver medal – second place	2025 Kocaeli	74 kg
Poland Open (Wacław Ziółkowski Memorial)
Bronze medal – third place	2023 Warsaw	74 kg

Ramazan Ramazanov (Russian: Рамазан Эльдарович Рамазанов; born 15 February 1995) is a Russian-born Bulgarian wrestler of Avar origin. He won the silver medal in the 70 kg event at the 2023 European Wrestling Championships held in Zagreb, Croatia.

== Career ==
In August 2018 he went to the Russian Championship as a member of the Dagestan national team. In November 2018 he won a bronze medal at the tournament in memory of Dinmukhamed Kunayev in Kazakhstan. Until 2019 he represented Russia, after which he began to play for Bulgaria. At the end of January 2020, he won the Bulgarian championship. In January 2023, he again became the champion of Bulgaria.

At the 2022 European Wrestling Championships held in Budapest, Hungary, he won the bronze medal in the 70 kg freestyle match in the third place match against Azerbaijani Ziraddin Bayramov by beating his opponent with a button after leading 11–7.

He competed in the 70 kg event at the 2022 World Wrestling Championships held in Belgrade, Serbia.

In 2023, he won the silver medal at the 2023 European Wrestling Championships in Zagreb, Croatia, losing 10–3 to Azerbaijani Haji Aliyev in the final match of the 70 kg men's freestyle. He won one of the bronze medals in the men's 70 kg event at the 2024 European Wrestling Championships held in Bucharest, Romania.

== Achievements ==
Year	Tournament	Location	Result	Event
2022	European Championships	Budapest, Hungary	3rd	Freestyle 70 kg
2023	European Championships	Zagreb, Croatia	2nd	Freestyle 70 kg
2023	World Championships	Belgrade, Serbia	3rd	Freestyle 70 kg
2024	European Championships	Bucharest, Romania	3rd	Freestyle 70 kg
