= Ernazar Akmataliev =

Kyrgyzstani wrestler (born 1998)

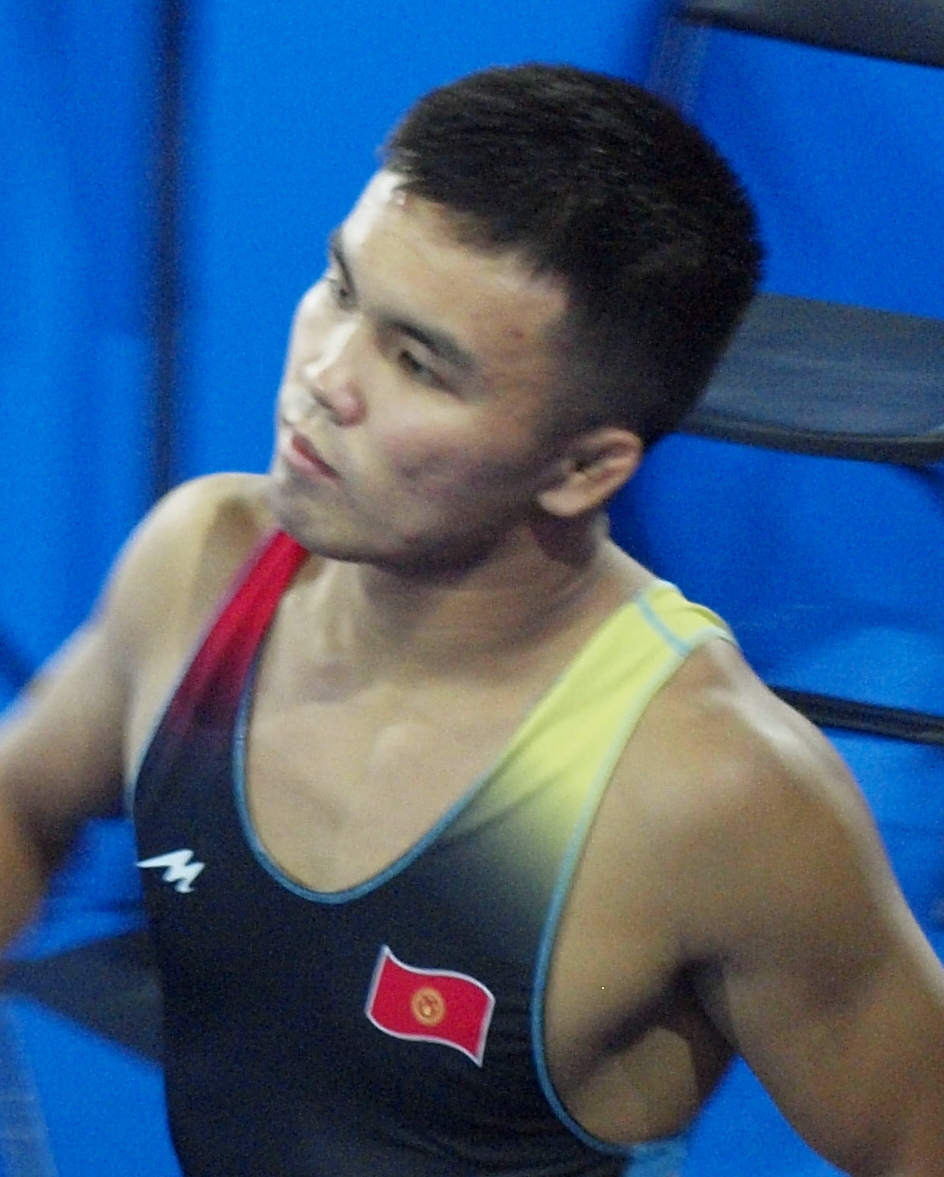
- Ernazar Akmataliev at the 2021 World Wrestling Championships in Oslo, Norway

Personal information
- Nationality: Kyrgyzstani
- Born: 2 July 1998 (age 28) Orto-Nura, Naryn District, Kyrgyzstan

Sport
- Sport: Freestyle wrestling
Medal record
Men's freestyle wrestling
Representing Kyrgyzstan
World Championships
| Silver medal – second place | 2021 Oslo | 70 kg |
| Silver medal – second place | 2026 Astana | 70 kg |
| Bronze medal – third place | 2022 Belgrade | 70 kg |
| Bronze medal – third place | 2025 Zagreb | 70 kg |
Asian Championships
| Gold medal – first place | 2025 Amman | 70 kg |
| Silver medal – second place | 2022 Ulaanbaatar | 70 kg |
| Bronze medal – third place | 2026 Bishkek | 70 kg |
Islamic Solidarity Games
| Gold medal – first place | 2021 Konya | 70 kg |
Yasar Dogu Tournament
| Gold medal – first place | 2024 Antalya | 70 kg |
| Silver medal – second place | 2021 Istanbul | 65 kg |
Grand Prix
| Gold medal – first place | 2022 Almaty | 70 kg |
| Gold medal – first place | 2026 Tirana | 70 kg |
| Bronze medal – third place | 2023 Bishkek | 70 kg |
World U23 Championships
| Gold medal – first place | 2021 Belgrade | 70 kg |
Representing All-World Team
World Cup
| Bronze medal – third place | 2022 Coralville | Team |

Ernazar Akmataliev (born 2 July 1998) is a Kyrgyzstani wrestler. He won the gold medal in the 70 kg event at the 2021 U23 World Wrestling Championships held in Belgrade, Serbia. He competed in the men's freestyle 65 kg event at the 2020 Summer Olympics, but lost the first match to Bajrang Punia.

He won one of the bronze medals in the men's 70 kg event at the 2022 World Wrestling Championships held in Belgrade, Serbia.

He competed at the 2024 Asian Wrestling Olympic Qualification Tournament in Bishkek, Kyrgyzstan and he earned a quota place for Kyrgyzstan for the 2024 Summer Olympics in Paris, France.

Akmataliev signed with Real American Freestyle (RAF) and was scheduled to debut against Zain Retherford at RAF 09 on May 30, 2026. However, due to visa issues, he was unable to compete and ended up facing Retherford at RAF Georgia on July 11, 2026, winning by decision on criteria after a 3–3 tie.

== Matches ==
Notable matches
| Event | Opposition | Category | Date | Result |
|---|---|---|---|---|
| 2020 Summer Olympics | Bajrang Punia | -65 kg | 6 Aug | 3-3 L |
