= Zabolotiv settlement hromada =

Hromada in Ivano-Frankivsk Oblast, Ukraine

Zabolotiv settlement hromada Заболотівська селищна громада
- Hromada
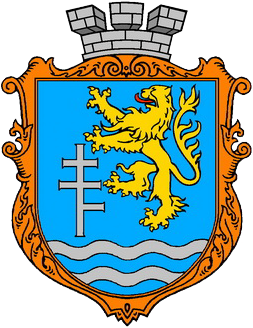
- Coat of arms
- Interactive map of Zabolotiv settlement hromada
- Country: Ukraine
- Oblast: Ivano-Frankivsk Oblast
- Raion: Kolomyia Raion
- Admin. center: Chernelytsia

Area
  - Total: 212.5 km^{2} (82.0 sq mi)

Population
  - Total: 19,980
  - Density: 94.02/km^{2} (243.5/sq mi)
- CATOTTG code: UA26080050000081474
- Settlements: 20
- Rural settlements: 1
- Villages: 19
- Website: zabolotiv-rada.gov.ua

Zabolotiv settlement hromada (Ukrainian: Заболотівська селищна громада) is a hromada in Ukraine, in Kolomyia Raion of Ivano-Frankivsk Oblast. The administrative center is the rural settlement of Zabolotiv.

== Settlements ==
The hromada consists of 1 rural settlement (Zabolotiv) and 19 villages:

- Balyntsi
- Borshchiv
- Borshchivska Turka
- Buchachky
- Vyshnivka
- Hankivtsi
- Zibranivka
- Illintsi
- Kelykhiv
- Liubkivtsi
- Oleshkiv
- Rozhnevi Polia
- Rudnyky
- Troitsia
- Trostianets
- Trofanivka
- Tulukiv
- Khlibychyn
- Shevchenkove
