= Taishi Narikuni =

Japanese freestyle wrestler

Personal information
- Nationality: Japan
- Born: 成国大志; 13 November 1997 (age 28) Tokyo, Japan
- Height: 167 cm (5 ft 6 in)

Sport
- Country: Japan
- Sport: Amateur wrestling
- Weight class: 70 kg
- Event: Freestyle

Achievements and titles
- World finals: (gold) (2022)
- Regional finals: (gold) (2022)
Medal record
Men's freestyle wrestling
Representing Japan
World Championships
Gold medal – first place	2022 Belgrade	70 kg
Asian Championships
Gold medal – first place	2022 Ulaanbaatar	70 kg
Asian Cadets Championships
Silver medal – second place	2014 Bangkok	54 kg

Taishi Narikuni (born 13 November 1997) is a Japanese freestyle wrestler. He won the gold medal in the men's 70 kg event at the 2022 World Wrestling Championships held in Belgrade, Serbia. He also won the gold medal in his event at the 2022 Asian Wrestling Championships held in Ulaanbaatar, Mongolia.

His mother Akiko Iijima is a four-time medalist at the World Wrestling Championships, including two gold medals (1990 and 1991).

== Achievements ==
Year	Tournament	Location	Result	Event
2022	Asian Championships	Ulaanbaatar, Mongolia	1st	Freestyle 70 kg
2022	World Championships	Belgrade, Serbia	1st	Freestyle 70 kg
