= Ihor Nykyforuk =

Ukrainian freestyle wrestler

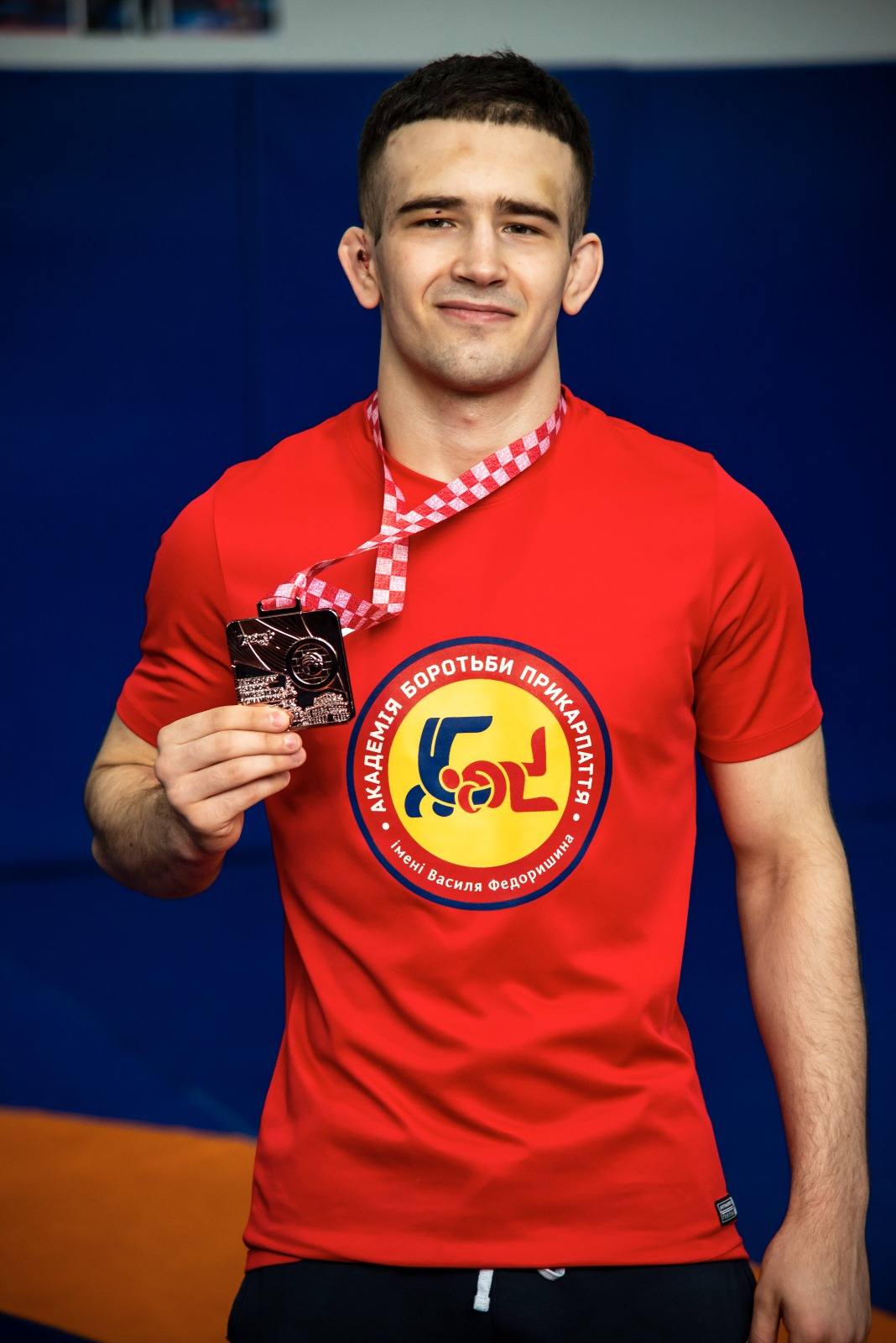
- Nykyforuk in 2023

Personal information
- Native name: Ігор Іванович Никифорук
- Nationality: Ukraine
- Born: 2 October 1999 (age 26) Troitsia, Kolomyia Raion, Ivano-Frankivsk Oblast

Sport
- Country: Ukraine
- Sport: Amateur wrestling
- Weight class: 74 kg
- Event: Freestyle
- Club: "Kolos", Ivano-Frankivsk Oblast
- Coached by: I. Kuryliuk, V. Fedoryshyn
Medal record
Men's freestyle wrestling
Representing Ukraine
European Championships
Bronze medal – third place	2021 Warsaw	70 kg
Bronze medal – third place	2023 Zagreb	70 kg
Dan Kolov & Nikola Petrov Tournament
Bronze medal – third place	2026 Plovdiv	74 kg
Grand Prix
Gold medal – first place	2023 Sassari	70 kg
Gold medal – first place	2023 Budapest	70 kg
Bronze medal – third place	2023 Alexandria	70 kg
World U23 Championships
Bronze medal – third place	2019 Budapest	65 kg
European Juniors Championships
Bronze medal – third place	2018 Rome	61 kg

Ihor Nykyforuk (born 2 October 1999 in Troitsia, Ivano-Frankivsk Oblast) is a Ukrainian freestyle wrestler who competes in the 74 kilograms category.

Nykyforuk has claimed a bronze medal at both the 2021 and the 2023 European Championships. He also is a two-time medallist of the Juniors and U23 Championships.

== Achievements ==
Year	Tournament	Venue	Result	Event
2018	World Juniors Championships	Trnava, Slovakia	17th	Freestyle 61 kg
2018	European Juniors Championships	Rome, Italy	3rd	Freestyle 61 kg
2019	U23 World Championships	Budapest, Hungary	3rd	Freestyle 65 kg
2019	U23 European Championships	Novi Sad, Serbia	13th	Freestyle 65 kg
2021	European Championships	Warsaw, Poland	3rd	Freestyle 70 kg
2022	U23 World Championships	Pontevedra, Spain	7th	Freestyle 70 kg
2023	European Championships	Zagreb, Croatia	3rd	Freestyle 70 kg
