= Servet Coşkun =

Turkish wrestler (born 1990)

Personal information
- Nationality: Turkish
- Born: 28 October 1990 (age 35) Turkey
- Height: 1.70 m (5 ft 7 in)
- Weight: 70 kg (154 lb)

Sport
- Country: Turkey
- Sport: Sport wrestling
- Event: Freestyle
- Club: Ankara ASKİ
- Turned pro: 2011
- Coached by: İbrahim Akgül, Ali Özen
Medal record
Representing Turkey
Men's Freestyle Wrestling
European Championships
Silver medal – second place	2014 Vantaa	65 kg
Yasar Dogu Tournament
Bronze medal – third place	2011 Istanbul	66 kg
Dan Kolov & Nikola Petrov Tournament
Gold medal – first place	2013 Plovdiv	66 kg
Silver medal – second place	2023 Sofia	70 kg
Bronze medal – third place	2014 Sofia	66 kg
Grand Prix
Bronze medal – third place	2011 Madrid	66 kg
Bronze medal – third place	2014 Minsk	65 kg
Bronze medal – third place	2020 Warsaw	65 kg
European Cadets Championships
Silver medal – second place	2006 İstanbul	58 kg

Servet Coşkun (born 28 October 1990) is a Turkish freestyle wrestler.

== Career ==
Servet Coşkun competed at the 65 kg division in the 2014 European Wrestling Championships and won the silver medal after losing to Magomed Kurbanaliev of Russia.

He competed in the 70 kg event at the 2022 World Wrestling Championships held in Belgrade, Serbia.
