= Amir Mohammad Yazdani =

Iranian wrestler (born 2000)

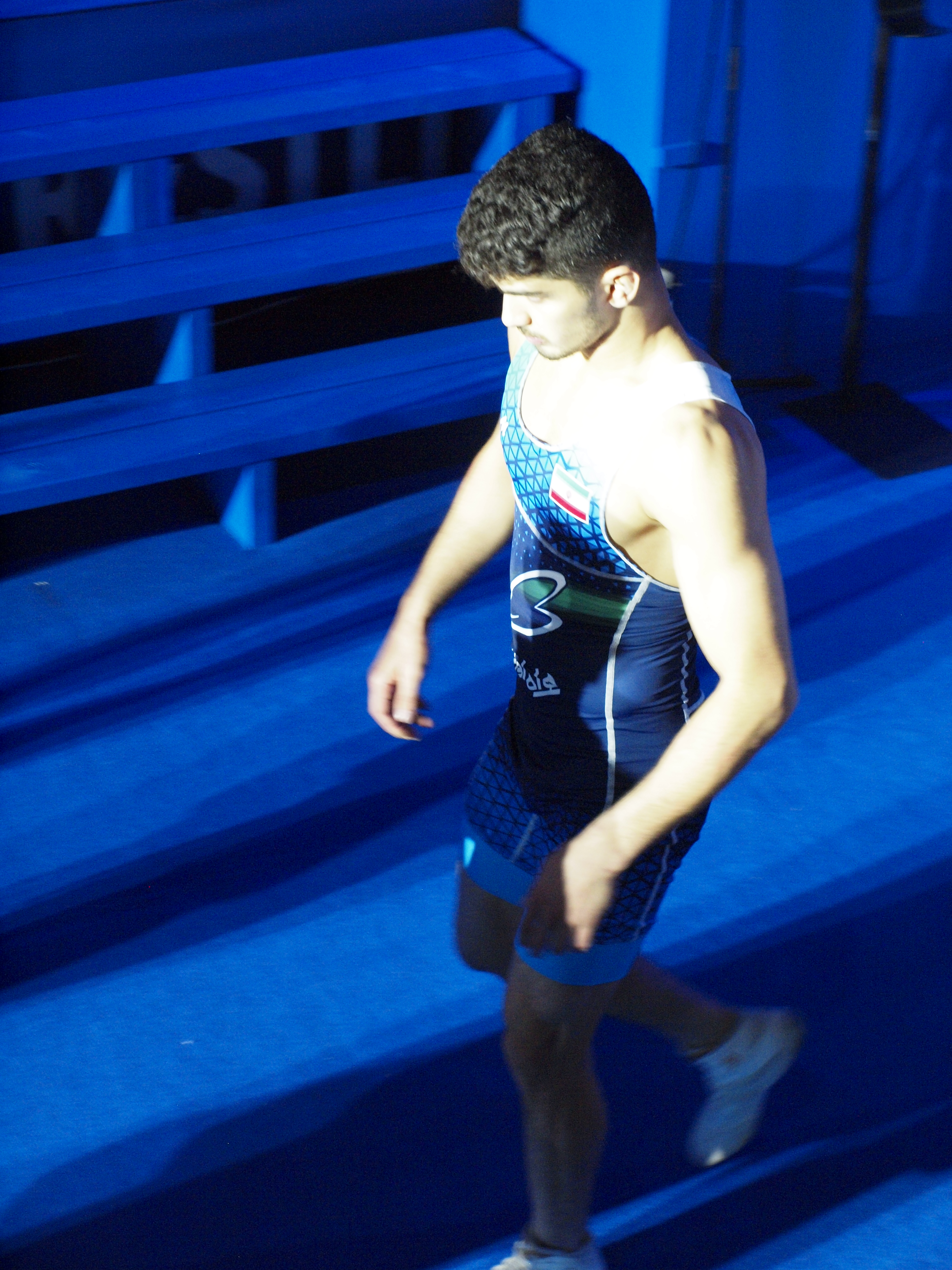

Personal information
- Native name: امیر محمد یزدانی چراتی
- Full name: Amir Mohammad Yazdani Cherati
- Nationality: Iran
- Born: 28 September 2000 (age 26) Juybar, Mazadaran, Iran
- Height: 176 cm (5 ft 9 in)

Sport
- Country: Iran
- Sport: Wrestling
- Weight class: 74 kg
- Event: Freestyle

Achievements and titles
- World finals: (silver) (2021, 2023)
Medal record
Men's freestyle wrestling
Representing Iran
World Championships
Silver medal – second place	2021 Oslo	65 kg
Silver medal – second place	2023 Belgrade	70 kg
Bronze medal – third place	2026 Astana	74 kg
Asian Championships
Gold medal – first place	2024 Bishkek	70 kg
Bronze medal – third place	2026 Bishkek	74 kg
World Cup
Silver medal – second place	2022 Coralville	Team
Yasar Dogu Tournament
Gold medal – first place	2022 Istanbul	70 kg
Bronze medal – third place	2024 Antalya	70 kg
Dan Kolov & Nikola Petrov Tournament
Bronze medal – third place	2023 Sofia	70 kg
Grand Prix
Silver medal – second place	2025 Ulaanbaatar	74 kg
World U23 Championships
Silver medal – second place	2022 Pontevedra	70 kg
Asian U23 Championships
Silver medal – second place	2019 Ulaanbaatar	65 kg
World Cadets Championships
Silver medal – second place	2015 Sarajevo	42 kg

Amir Mohammad Yazdani Cherati (Persian: امیر محمد یزدانی چراتی; born 28 September 2000) is an Iranian wrestler. He competed in the 2021 World Wrestling Championships at Oslo, Norway, where he won the silver medal in the men's 65 kg event.

In 2022, he won the gold medal in his event at the Yasar Dogu Tournament held in Istanbul, Turkey. At the 2023 World Wrestling Championships in Belgrade, he won a silver medal in the 70 kg weight category. In the final bout he lost to Zain Retherford from the US with the score 5:8.
