= Jordan Oliver (amateur wrestler) =

American wrestler (born 1990)

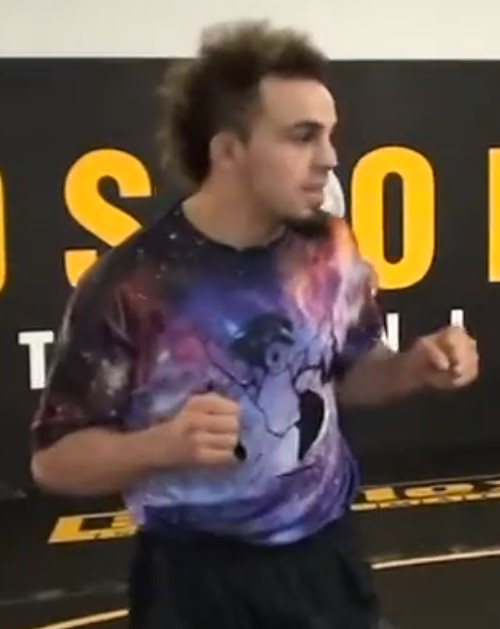
- Oliver in 2018
- Born: Jordan Michael Oliver; May 8, 1990 (age 36); Easton, Pennsylvania, U.S.
- Other names: That Dude
- Height: 5 ft 6 in (1.68 m)
- Weight: 145 lb (66 kg; 10 st 5 lb)
- Division: Featherweight
- Reach: 70.5 in (179 cm)
- Style: Freestyle and Folkstyle
- Fighting out of: State College, Pennsylvania, U.S.
- Team: Kill Cliff FC; Gator Wrestling Club (Kenny Monday)
- Wrestling: NCAA Division I Wrestling
- Years active: 2023–present

Mixed martial arts record
- Total: 3
- Wins: 3
- By submission: 1
- By decision: 2
- Losses: 0

Other information
- University: Oklahoma State Cowboys
- Website: 6jolife.com
- Mixed martial arts record from Sherdog

Jordan Michael Oliver (born May 8, 1990) is an American professional mixed martial arts fighter and former freestyle and folkstyle wrestler who competes in the featherweight division. He currently competes in the Featherweight division of Real American Freestyle (RAF), where he was formerly RAF Featherweight Champion.

In freestyle, he was a two-time U.S. national champion and a medalist at multiple international tournaments. In folkstyle, Oliver was a two-time NCAA Division I national champion, a Schalles Award winner, and a four-time Big 12 Conference champion with Oklahoma State.

== Early life and education ==
Oliver was born and raised in Easton, Pennsylvania. He attended Easton Area High School, where he was a member of the school's wrestling team, which competes in the Eastern Pennsylvania Conference, one of the nation's top high school wrestling divisions. In his four year wrestling career at Easton High School, he posted a record of 175–5, setting the record for most victories at the PIAA Class AAA level. After a 42–4 campaign as a freshman, where he placed second in the PIAA state tournament, Oliver won three consecutive PIAA AAA state championships, posting annual records of 48–0, 45–1 and 40–0 as a sophomore, junior, and senior, respectively.

In 2008, as the nation's top high school wrestling recruit, he committed to the Oklahoma State Cowboys.

== Oklahoma State University ==
=== 2008–2009 ===
As a redshirt freshman, Oliver compiled a 19–1 record and won the Missouri Open, the Oklahoma Open, and the Roger Denker Open, and earned runner-up honors at the Central Missouri Open and the Loper Open.

Switching to freestyle, Oliver became the U20 US World Team Member and National champion and the U.S. university national champion. He then claimed a bronze medal from the U20 World Championships.

=== 2009–2010 ===
During his freshman year, Oliver posted a 32–4 record, won his first Big 12 Conference title and became an All-American after a fourth-place finish at the NCAA National tournament.

=== 2010–2011 ===
As a sophomore, Oliver went 29–0 with 24 wins coming with bonus points, became a two-time Big 12 Conference champion and claimed his first NCAA Division I National title, after a perfect 5–0 run at the NCAA tournament.

=== 2011–2012 ===
As a junior, Oliver went 28–2, with 18 of his victories coming via fall, setting a single-season school record. After grabbing a third Big 12 Conference title, Oliver fell to eventual four-time NCAA champion Logan Stieber in the finals of the NCAA tournament, claiming runner-up honors. After the season, he received the Schalles Award as the nation's best pinner.

Returning to freestyle, Oliver competed at the US Olympic Team Trials, though was unable to win either of his two matches.

=== 2012–2013 ===
Moving up from 133 pounds to 149 pounds, Oliver went 38–0 throughout the season, closing off his collegiate career as a four-time Big 12 Conference champion and a two-time NCAA Division I National champion.

== Freestyle ==
=== 2013 ===
Fresh off his second NCAA title, Oliver placed second at the US Open National championship in April, notably defeating fellow two-time NCAA champion Brent Metcalf in the semifinals.

After wins over U20 World champion Magomed Kurbanaliev and two-time Olympian Haislan Garcia at Beat the Streets in May, Oliver fell in the US World Team Trials Challenge Tournament finals to Brent Metcalf.

=== 2014 ===
After a sixth-place finish at the US Open in April, Oliver defeated NCAA runner-up Borislav Novachkov at Beat the Streets in May. In June, he notably defeated Reece Humphrey at the US World Team Trials before falling to Brent Metcalf in the best-of-three finals. In November, he placed third at the Bill Farrell Memorial International, notably defeating Georgi Ivanov.

=== 2015 ===
To start off the year, Oliver recorded wins over two-time US National champion Reece Humphrey and U17 World champion Zain Retherford to earn a gold medal from the Dave Schultz Memorial International, in January. In March, he earned a bronze medal from the Yasar Dogu International, where after a first-round loss to Evgheni Nedealco, he battled back with three wins, including one over returning World medalist Bekzod Abdurakhmonov.

In May, he reached the finals of the US National Championships, falling to Brent Metcalf, and in June, he made the finals of the US World Team Trials, where after defeating U20 World medalist Joseph McKenna and returning US World Team Member Jimmy Kennedy, he once again fell to Metcalf in a best-of-three series. He closed off the year in November, grabbing a Bill Farrell Memorial title with wins over four-time NCAA champion Logan Stieber, NCAA champion Frank Molinaro and three-time NCAA (DIII) champion Nazar Kulchytskyy.

=== 2016 ===
In April, Oliver fell in the first round of the US Olympic Team Trials to U17 World champion Aaron Pico, and in November, he bumped up to 70 kilograms to compete at the Bill Farrell Memorial in an attempt to make the US World Team, though fell in the best-of-three finals to returning World medalist James Green.

=== 2017 ===
After repeating as Dave Schultz Memorial champion in January, Oliver had become a US National champion with wins over returning Olympian Frank Molinaro, two-time NCAA champion Zain Retherford and All-American Jaydin Eierman. However, it was later announced that Oliver had been stripped of his title and suspended for a year due to amphetamines. Before the suspension, he had been defeated by World champion Frank Chamizo at Beat the Streets in May.

=== 2018 ===
Following his suspension, Oliver defeated Olympic champion Toghrul Asgarov at Beat the Streets in May. In September, he placed fifth at the Poland Open, notably having a close high-scoring match with Akhmed Chakaev.

=== 2019 ===
In March, Oliver placed second at the Dan Kolov Memorial, defeating U20 World champion Selahattin Kılıçsallayan in the semis before falling to returning World finalist Bajrang Punia in the finals. After a sixth-place performance at the US Open, Oliver failed to defeat two-time Dan Hodge Trophy winner Zain Retherford in a best-of-three series to advance to Final X.

In November, Oliver claimed the Bill Farrell Memorial title, with wins over NCAA runner-up Frank Molinaro, U23 World medalist Joseph McKenna and two-time NCAA runner-up Bryce Meredith. In December, Oliver once again claimed a crown, now from the US National Championships, scoring technical falls over all four of his opponents, including McKenna and Meredith.

=== 2020 ===
In January, Oliver placed second at the Matteo Pellicone Ranking Series, defeating U20 World champions Erik Arushanian and Selahattin Kılıçsallayan, though falling to returning World medalist Bajrang Punia. In the first event since the COVID-19 outbreak, Oliver fell to three-time NCAA champion Jason Nolf at Rumble on the Rooftop.

By the end of the year, he competed at the Flo 8-Man Challenge: 150 lbs, where he was upset in the first round by All-American Alec Pantaleo.

=== 2021 ===
In April, Oliver competed at the rescheduled US Olympic Team Trials, in an attempt of represent the United States at the 2020 Summer Olympics. After defeating reigning NCAA champion Nick Lee, Oliver was able to upset two-time NCAA champion Yianni Diakomihalis to advance to the finale, where he faced US National champion Joseph McKenna in a best-of-three series. After shutting him down twice, Oliver became the US Olympic Team Trials winner.

Since the United States had been unable to qualify the weight class at the 2020 Pan American Olympic Qualification Tournament, Oliver was forced to attempt to do so at the 2021 World Olympic Qualification Tournament in May. After wins over Yun Jun-sik, Hor Ohannesian and Ruhan Rasim to reach the semifinals, Oliver fell to World finalist Magomedmurad Gadzhiev, failing to qualify for the 2020 Summer Olympics.

Set to compete at the Pan American Continental Championships, Oliver chose to forego the tournament due to atorn LCL. Oliver then bulked up to 70 kilograms to compete at the 2021 US World Team Trials in September, defeating three-time NCAA champion Zain Retherford before falling to World finalist James Green and forfeiting out of the tournament.

=== 2022 ===
In February, Oliver competed at the Yasar Dogu International, though was eliminated in the first round. In March, he also fell to Alec Pantaleo at a dual event, before reaching the finals of the US Open in April, though again falling to Pantaleo.

In May, Oliver competed in the last tournament of his career, defeating NCAA champion Ryan Deakin to advance to the best-of-three finals of the US World Team Trials, where he fell to Zain Retherford two matches to one at Final X. In March 2023, USADA suspended Oliver for the second time, now for two years due to THC found in a sample from the US World Team Trials.

== Mixed martial arts career ==
=== Bellator MMA ===
On March 1, 2023, it was announced that Oliver had signed with Bellator MMA to start his mixed martial arts career. Oliver made his MMA debut against Andrew Triolo on August 11, 2023 at Bellator 298. He won the fight via an arm triangle choke submission in the first round.

Oliver faced Braydon Akeo on August 16, 2024 at PFL 8. He won the fight by unanimous decision.

== Mixed martial arts record ==
Professional record breakdown
3 matches	3 wins	0 losses
By submission	1	0
By decision	2	0

Res.	Record	Opponent	Method	Event	Date	Round	Time	Location	Notes
Win	3–0	Calob Ramirez	Decision (unanimous)	LFA 207	April 18, 2025	3	5:00	Sioux Falls, South Dakota, United States	
Win	2–0	Braydon Akeo	Decision (unanimous)	PFL 8 (2024)	August 16, 2024	3	5:00	Hollywood, Florida, United States	
Win	1–0	Andrew Triolo	Submission (arm-triangle choke)	Bellator 298	August 11, 2023	1	1:05	Sioux Falls, South Dakota, United States	Featherweight debut.

== Freestyle record ==
Senior Freestyle Matches
Res.	Record	Opponent	Score	Date	Event	Location
Win	90-31	(United States) Michael Vanschenkbrill	5-0	April 18, 2026	RAF 08	(United States) Philadelphia, Pennsylvania
Win	89-31	(United States) Beau Bartlett	5-3	February 28, 2026	RAF 06	(United States) Tempe, Arizona
Win	88-31	(United States) Real Woods	3-3	January 10, 2026	RAF 05	(United States) Sunrise, Florida
RAF 03 145 lb (Won RAF Featherweight Championship)
Win	87-31	(United States) Real Woods	2-2	November 29, 2025	RAF 03	(United States) Chicago, Illinois
2024 US World Team Trials DNP at 70 kg
Loss		(United States) Yahya Thomas	FF	September 14, 2024	2024 World Team Trials	(United States) Omaha, Nebraska
Loss	86–31	(United States) James Green	3-6	September 14, 2024	2024 World Team Trials	(United States) Omaha, Nebraska
Win	86–30	(United States) Bryce Andonian	8-6	September 14, 2024	2024 World Team Trials	(United States) Omaha, Nebraska
Win	85-30	(United States) Ryan Jack	TF 11-0	September 14, 2024	2024 World Team Trials	(United States) Omaha, Nebraska
2022 US World Team Trials (silver) at 70 kg
Loss	84–30	(United States) Zain Retherford	3–4	June 3, 2022	2022 Final X: Stillwater	(United States) Stillwater, Oklahoma
Win	84–29	(United States) Zain Retherford	5–4	June 3, 2022	2022 Final X: Stillwater	(United States) Stillwater, Oklahoma
Loss	83–29	(United States) Zain Retherford	3–8	June 3, 2022	2022 Final X: Stillwater	(United States) Stillwater, Oklahoma
Win	83–28	(United States) Ryan Deakin	7–4	May 21–22, 2022	2022 US World Team Trials Challenge Tournament	(United States) Coralville, Iowa
Win	82–28	(United States) Michael Blockhus	4–2	May 21–22, 2022	2022 US World Team Trials Challenge Tournament	(United States) Coralville, Iowa
2022 US Open (silver) at 70 kg
Loss	81–28	(United States) Alec Pantaleo	2–3	April 27 – May 1, 2022	2022 US Open National Championships	(United States) Las Vegas, Nevada
Win	81–27	(United States) Tyler Berger	6–2	April 27 – May 1, 2022	2022 US Open National Championships	(United States) Las Vegas, Nevada
Win	80–27	(United States) Sammy Sasso	7–1	April 27 – May 1, 2022	2022 US Open National Championships	(United States) Las Vegas, Nevada
Win	79–27	(United States) Devinaire Hayes	TF 11–0	April 27 – May 1, 2022	2022 US Open National Championships	(United States) Las Vegas, Nevada
Win	78–27	(United States) Dean Noble	Fall	April 27 – May 1, 2022	2022 US Open National Championships	(United States) Las Vegas, Nevada
Loss	77–27	(United States) Alec Pantaleo	1–4	March 16, 2022	Rudis+: Snyder vs. Cox	(United States) Detroit, Michigan
2022 Yasar Dogu DNP at 70 kg
Loss	77–26	(Iran) Aliakbar Fazlikhalili	2–4	February 27, 2022	2022 Yasar Dogu International	Istanbul, Turkey
2021 US World Team Trials DNP at 70 kg
		(United States) Tyler Berger	FF	September 11, 2021	2021 US World Team Trials	(United States) Lincoln, Nebraska
Loss	77–26	(United States) James Green	4–6	September 11, 2021	2021 US World Team Trials	(United States) Lincoln, Nebraska
Win	77–25	(United States) Zain Retherford	2–2	September 11, 2021	2021 US World Team Trials	(United States) Lincoln, Nebraska
2021 World Olympic Qualification Tournament 5th at 65 kg
Loss	76–25	(Poland) Magomedmurad Gadzhiev	2–3	May 6, 2021	2021 World Olympic Qualification Tournament	Sofia, Bulgaria
Win	76–24	(Ukraine) Hor Ohannesian	3–3	May 6, 2021	2021 World Olympic Qualification Tournament	Sofia, Bulgaria
Win	75–24	(South Korea) Yun Jun-sik	5–4	May 6, 2021	2021 World Olympic Qualification Tournament	Sofia, Bulgaria
Win	74–24	(Bulgaria) Ruhan Rasim	6–2	May 6, 2021	2021 World Olympic Qualification Tournament	Sofia, Bulgaria
2020 US Olympic Team Trials (gold) at 65 kg
Win	73–24	(United States) Joey McKenna	5–2	April 2–3, 2021	2020 US Olympic Team Trials	(United States) Fort Worth, Texas
Win	72–24	(United States) Joey McKenna	3–0	April 2–3, 2021	2020 US Olympic Team Trials	(United States) Fort Worth, Texas
Win	71–24	(United States) Yianni Diakomihalis	4–4	April 2–3, 2021	2020 US Olympic Team Trials	(United States) Fort Worth, Texas
Win	70–24	(United States) Nick Lee	8–3	April 2–3, 2021	2020 US Olympic Team Trials	(United States) Fort Worth, Texas
Flo 8-Man Challenge at 150 lbs
Loss	69–24	(United States) Alec Pantaleo	4–4	December 18, 2020	Flo 8-Man Challenge: 150 lbs	(United States) Austin, Texas
Loss	69–23	(United States) Jason Nolf	1–4	June 28, 2020	2020 Rumble on the Rooftop	(United States) Chicago, Illinois
2020 Matteo Pellicone Ranking Series (silver) at 65 kg
Loss	69–22	(India) Bajrang Punia	3–4	January 15, 2020	2020 Matteo Pellicone Ranking Series	Rome, Italy
Win	69–21	(Ukraine) Erik Arushanian	7–0	January 15, 2020	2020 Matteo Pellicone Ranking Series	Rome, Italy
Win	68–21	(Turkey) Selahattin Kılıçsallayan	4–0	January 15, 2020	2020 Matteo Pellicone Ranking Series	Rome, Italy
Win	67–21	(Kazakhstan) Syrbaz Talgat	TF 10–0	January 15, 2020	2020 Matteo Pellicone Ranking Series	Rome, Italy
2019 US Nationals (gold) at 65 kg
Win	66–21	(United States) Joey McKenna	TF 10–0	December 22, 2019	2019 US National Championships	(United States) Fort Worth, Texas
Win	65–21	(United States) Nick Lee	TF 10–0	December 22, 2019	2019 US National Championships	(United States) Fort Worth, Texas
Win	64–21	(United States) Bryce Meredith	TF 10–0	December 22, 2019	2019 US National Championships	(United States) Fort Worth, Texas
Win	63–21	(United States) Nate Hansen	TF 10–0	December 22, 2019	2019 US National Championships	(United States) Fort Worth, Texas
2019 Bill Farrell Memorial (gold) at 65 kg
Win	62–21	(United States) Frank Molinaro	8–6	November 16, 2019	2019 Bill Farrell Memorial International	(United States) New York City, New York
Win	61–21	(United States) Joey McKenna	5–3	November 16, 2019	2019 Bill Farrell Memorial International	(United States) New York City, New York
Win	60–21	(United States) Bryce Meredith	TF 11–0	November 16, 2019	2019 Bill Farrell Memorial International	(United States) New York City, New York
Win	59–21	(United States) Nick Dardanes	TF 10–0	November 16, 2019	2019 Bill Farrell Memorial International	(United States) New York City, New York
2019 US World Team Trials (bronze) at 65 kg
Loss	58–21	(United States) Zain Retherford	6–7	May 19, 2019	2019 US World Team Trials Challenge Tournament	(United States) Raleigh, North Carolina
Loss	58–20	(United States) Zain Retherford	6–7	May 19, 2019	2019 US World Team Trials Challenge Tournament	(United States) Raleigh, North Carolina
Win	58–19	(United States) Dominick Demas	6–2	May 19, 2019	2019 US World Team Trials Challenge Tournament	(United States) Raleigh, North Carolina
Win	57–19	(United States) Kanen Storr	6–2	May 19, 2019	2019 US World Team Trials Challenge Tournament	(United States) Raleigh, North Carolina
2019 US Open 6th at 65 kg
Loss		(United States) Jayson Ness	FF	April 26, 2019	2019 US Open National Championships	(United States) Las Vegas, Nevada
Loss	56–19	(United States) Yianni Diakomihalis	TF 5–16	April 26, 2019	2019 US Open National Championships	(United States) Las Vegas, Nevada
Win	56–18	(United States) Evan Henderson	8–0	April 26, 2019	2019 US Open National Championships	(United States) Las Vegas, Nevada
Win	55–18	(United States) Taylor Summers	TF 11–1	April 26, 2019	2019 US Open National Championships	(United States) Las Vegas, Nevada
Win	54–18	(United States) Montell Marion	7–1	April 26, 2019	2019 US Open National Championships	(United States) Las Vegas, Nevada
2019 Dan Kolov - Nikola Petrov (silver) at 65 kg
Loss	53–18	(India) Bajrang Punia	3–12	March 1, 2019	2019 Dan Kolov - Nikola Petrov Ranking Series	Russe, Bulgaria
Win	53–17	(Turkey) Selahattin Kılıçsallayan	9–1	March 1, 2019	2019 Dan Kolov - Nikola Petrov Ranking Series	Russe, Bulgaria
Win	52–17	(United States) Evan Henderson	TF 12–1	March 1, 2019	2019 Dan Kolov - Nikola Petrov Ranking Series	Russe, Bulgaria
Win	51–17	(United States) Bernard Futrell	TF 10–0	March 1, 2019	2019 Dan Kolov - Nikola Petrov Ranking Series	Russe, Bulgaria
Win	50–17	(Argentina) Agustín Destribats	3–3	March 1, 2019	2019 Dan Kolov - Nikola Petrov Ranking Series	Russe, Bulgaria
2018 Poland Open 5th at 65 kg
Loss		(Poland) Krzysztof Bieńkowski	FF	September 8, 2018	2018 Poland Open	Warsaw, Poland
Loss	49–17	(Russia) Akhmed Chakaev	8–9	September 8, 2018	2018 Poland Open	Warsaw, Poland
Win	49–16	(Japan) Masakazu Kamoi	4–1	September 8, 2018	2018 Poland Open	Warsaw, Poland
Win	48–16	(Canada) Michael Asselstine	TF 10–0	September 8, 2018	2018 Poland Open	Warsaw, Poland
Win	47–16	(Azerbaijan) Toghrul Asgarov	4–4	May 17, 2018	2018 Beat The Streets: Team USA vs. The World All-Stars	(United States) New York City, New York
Loss	46–16	(Italy) Frank Chamizo	6–7	May 17, 2017	2017 Beat The Streets: Times Square	(United States) New York City, New York
2017 US Open DNP at 65 kg
Win		(United States) Frank Molinaro	4–4	April 26, 2017	2017 US Open National Championships	(United States) Las Vegas, Nevada
Win		(United States) Zain Retherford	5–3	April 26, 2017	2017 US Open National Championships	(United States) Las Vegas, Nevada
Win		(United States) Kellen Russell	6–0	April 26, 2017	2017 US Open National Championships	(United States) Las Vegas, Nevada
Win		(United States) Deondre Wilson	TF 13–3	April 26, 2017	2017 US Open National Championships	(United States) Las Vegas, Nevada
Win		(United States) Jaydin Eierman	TF 11–1	April 26, 2017	2017 US Open National Championships	(United States) Las Vegas, Nevada
2017 Dave Schultz Memorial (gold) at 70 kg
Win	46–15	(United States) Jason Chamberlain	8–6	February 2, 2017	2017 Dave Schultz Memorial International	(United States) Colorado Springs, Colorado
Win	45–15	(United States) Nazar Kulchytskyy	7–2	February 2, 2017	2017 Dave Schultz Memorial International	(United States) Colorado Springs, Colorado
Win	44–15	(United States) Michael DePalma	TF 11–0	February 2, 2017	2017 Dave Schultz Memorial International	(United States) Colorado Springs, Colorado
2016 US World Team Trials (silver) at 70 kg
Loss	43–15	(United States) James Green	3–4	November 10, 2016	2016 Bill Farrell Memorial and US World Team Trials	(United States) New York City, New York
Loss	43–14	(United States) James Green	1–2	November 10, 2016	2016 Bill Farrell Memorial and US World Team Trials	(United States) New York City, New York
Win	43–13	(United States) Jimmy Kennedy	9–2	November 10, 2016	2016 Bill Farrell Memorial and US World Team Trials	(United States) New York City, New York
Win	42–13	(United States) Jason Chamberlain	8–2	November 10, 2016	2016 Bill Farrell Memorial and US World Team Trials	(United States) New York City, New York
Win	41–13	(United States) Kevin Levalley	TF 12–1	November 10, 2016	2016 Bill Farrell Memorial and US World Team Trials	(United States) New York City, New York
2016 US Olympic Team Trials DNP at 65 kg
Loss	40–13	(United States) Aaron Pico	9–11	April 9, 2016	2016 US Olympic Team Trials	(United States) Iowa City, Iowa
2015 Bill Farrell Memorial (gold) at 65 kg
Win	40–12	(United States) Logan Stieber	8–5	November 7, 2015	2015 Bill Farrell Memorial International	(United States) New York City, New York
Win	39–12	(United States) Frank Molinaro	4–4	November 7, 2015	2015 Bill Farrell Memorial International	(United States) New York City, New York
Win	38–12	(United States) Nazar Kulchytskyy	5–2	November 7, 2015	2015 Bill Farrell Memorial International	(United States) New York City, New York
Win	37–12	(Russia) Rustam Ampar	5–2	November 7, 2015	2015 Bill Farrell Memorial International	(United States) New York City, New York
2015 US World Team Trials (silver) at 65 kg
Loss	36–12	(United States) Brent Metcalf	0–7	June 14, 2015	2015 US World Team Trials	(United States) Madison, Wisconsin
Loss	36–11	(United States) Brent Metcalf	4–9	June 14, 2015	2015 US World Team Trials	(United States) Madison, Wisconsin
Win	36–10	(United States) Logan Stieber	8–5	June 14, 2015	2015 US World Team Trials Challenge Tournament	(United States) Madison, Wisconsin
Win	35–10	(United States) Jimmy Kennedy	2–2	June 14, 2015	2015 US World Team Trials Challenge Tournament	(United States) Madison, Wisconsin
Win	34–10	(United States) Joey McKenna	TF 10–0	June 14, 2015	2015 US World Team Trials Challenge Tournament	(United States) Madison, Wisconsin
2015 US Nationals (silver) at 65 kg
Loss	33–10	(United States) Brent Metcalf	1–2	May 8, 2015	2015 US National Championships	(United States) Las Vegas, Nevada
Win	33–9	(United States) Kellen Russell	4–3	May 8, 2015	2015 US National Championships	(United States) Las Vegas, Nevada
Win	32–9	(United States) Jayson Ness	5–0	May 8, 2015	2015 US National Championships	(United States) Las Vegas, Nevada
Win	31–9	(United States) Cole VonOhlen	TF 12–2	May 8, 2015	2015 US National Championships	(United States) Las Vegas, Nevada
2015 Yasar Dogu Memorial (bronze) at 70 kg
Win	30–9	(Uzbekistan) Bekzod Abdurakhmonov	4–2	March 28–29, 2015	2015 Yasar Dogu Memorial	Istanbul, Turkey
Win	29–9	(Turkey) Emre Ayvaz	TF 11–1	March 28–29, 2015	2015 Yasar Dogu Memorial	Istanbul, Turkey
Win	28–9	(Turkey) Mehmet Oktay	4–2	March 28–29, 2015	2015 Yasar Dogu Memorial	Istanbul, Turkey
Loss	27–9	(Moldova) Evgheni Nedealco	2–8	March 28–29, 2015	2015 Yasar Dogu Memorial	Istanbul, Turkey
2015 Dave Schultz Memorial (gold) at 65 kg
Win	27–8	(United States) Reece Humphrey	5–1	January 29, 2015	2015 Dave Schultz Memorial International	(United States) Colorado Springs, Colorado
Win	26–8	(United States) Jason Chamberlain	3–0	January 29, 2015	2015 Dave Schultz Memorial International	(United States) Colorado Springs, Colorado
Win	25–8	(United States) Zain Retherford	6–2	January 29, 2015	2015 Dave Schultz Memorial International	(United States) Colorado Springs, Colorado
Win	24–8	(United States) Brett Robbins	TF 10–0	January 29, 2015	2015 Dave Schultz Memorial International	(United States) Colorado Springs, Colorado
2014 Bill Farrell Memorial (bronze) at 70 kg
Win	23–8	(United States) Cyler Sanderson	4–0	November 7, 2014	2014 Bill Farrell Memorial International	(United States) New York City, New York
Win	22–8	(Bulgaria) Georgi Ivanov	TF 14–4	November 7, 2014	2014 Bill Farrell Memorial International	(United States) New York City, New York
Loss	21–8	(United States) Adam Hall	2–4	November 7, 2014	2014 Bill Farrell Memorial International	(United States) New York City, New York
Win	21–7	(United States) Cyler Sanderson	10–4	November 7, 2014	2014 Bill Farrell Memorial International	(United States) New York City, New York
Win	20–7	(Moldova) Igor Moroi	3–2	November 7, 2014	2014 Bill Farrell Memorial International	(United States) New York City, New York
2014 US World Team Trials (silver) at 65 kg
Loss	19–7	(United States) Brent Metcalf	0–3	June 1, 2014	2014 US World Team Trials	(United States) Madison, Wisconsin
Loss	19–6	(United States) Brent Metcalf	2–4	June 1, 2014	2014 US World Team Trials	(United States) Madison, Wisconsin
Win	19–5	(United States) Reece Humphrey	4–3	June 1, 2014	2014 US World Team Trials Challenge Tournament	(United States) Madison, Wisconsin
Win	18–5	(United States) Kellen Russell	3–1	June 1, 2014	2014 US World Team Trials Challenge Tournament	(United States) Madison, Wisconsin
Win	17–5	(United States) Nick Dardanes	2–0	June 1, 2014	2014 US World Team Trials Challenge Tournament	(United States) Madison, Wisconsin
Win	16–5	(Bulgaria) Borislav Novachkov	4–1	May 7, 2014	2014 Beat The Streets: Team USA vs. The World All-Stars	(United States) New York City, New York
2014 US Open 6th at 65 kg
Loss	15–5	(United States) Kellen Russell	2–4	April 17–19, 2014	2014 US Open National Championships	(United States) Las Vegas, Nevada
Win	15–4	(United States) Logan Stieber	5–3	April 17–19, 2014	2014 US Open National Championships	(United States) Las Vegas, Nevada
Win	14–4	(United States) Ryan Fillingame	Fall	April 17–19, 2014	2014 US Open National Championships	(United States) Las Vegas, Nevada
Win	13–4	(United States) Josh Howk	TF 10–0	April 17–19, 2014	2014 US Open National Championships	(United States) Las Vegas, Nevada
2013 US World Team Trials (bronze) at 66 kg
Loss	12–4	(United States) Brent Metcalf	3–6	June 20–22, 2013	2013 US World Team Trials Challenge Tournament	(United States) Stillwater, Oklahoma
Win	12–3	(United States) Chase Pami	TF 8–0	June 20–22, 2013	2013 US World Team Trials Challenge Tournament	(United States) Stillwater, Oklahoma
Win	11–3	(United States) Jason Chamberlain	TF 7–0	June 20–22, 2013	2013 US World Team Trials Challenge Tournament	(United States) Stillwater, Oklahoma
Win	10–3	(Canada) Haislan Garcia	5–2	May 19, 2013	2013 Beat The Streets: United 4 Wrestling	(United States) Los Angeles, California
Win	9–3	(Russia) Magomed Kurbanaliev	7–6	May 19, 2013	2013 Beat The Streets: United 4 Wrestling	(United States) Los Angeles, California
2013 US Open (silver) at 66 kg
Loss	8–3	(United States) Kellen Russell	1–0, 2–2, 0–1	April 17–20, 2013	2013 US Open National Championships	(United States) Las Vegas, Nevada
Win	8–2	(United States) Brent Metcalf	1–0, 0–1, 1–0	April 17–20, 2013	2013 US Open National Championships	(United States) Las Vegas, Nevada
Win	7–2	(United States) Jason Chamberlain	2–0, 5–2	April 17–20, 2013	2013 US Open National Championships	(United States) Las Vegas, Nevada
Win	6–2	(United States) Dylan Alton	0–1, 3–0, 2–0	April 17–20, 2013	2013 US Open National Championships	(United States) Las Vegas, Nevada
2012 US Olympic Team Trials DNP at 66 kg
Loss	5–2	(United States) Adam Hall	0–1, 1–1	April 21, 2012	2012 US Olympic Team Trials	(United States) Iowa City, Iowa
Loss	5–1	(United States) Brent Metcalf	0–1, 1–0, 0–1	April 21, 2012	2012 US Olympic Team Trials	(United States) Iowa City, Iowa
2009 US University Nationals (gold) at 60 kg
Win	5–0	(United States) Andrew Long	2–0, 4–0	April 24–26, 2009	2009 US University National Championships	(United States) Akron, Ohio
Win	4–0	(United States) Tyler Saltsman	Fall	April 24–26, 2009	2009 US University National Championships	(United States) Akron, Ohio
Win	3–0	(United States) Shane Valko	TF 7–0, 9–1	April 24–26, 2009	2009 US University National Championships	(United States) Akron, Ohio
Win	2–0	(United States) Michael DeMarco	TF 6–0, 7–0	April 24–26, 2009	2009 US University National Championships	(United States) Akron, Ohio
Win	1–0	(United States) Thane Antczak	TF 6–0, 6–0	April 24–26, 2009	2009 US University National Championships	(United States) Akron, Ohio

== NCAA record ==
NCAA Championships Matches
Res.	Record	Opponent	Score	Date	Event
2013 NCAA Championships (gold) at 149 lbs
Win	18–3	Jason Chamberlain	3–2	March 21–23, 2013	2013 NCAA Division I Wrestling Championships
Win	17–3	Steve Santos	MD 14–3	March 21–23, 2013	2013 NCAA Division I Wrestling Championships
Win	16–3	Jake Sueflohn	MD 11–3	March 21–23, 2013	2013 NCAA Division I Wrestling Championships
Win	15–3	Derek Valenti	MD 13–3	March 21–23, 2013	2013 NCAA Division I Wrestling Championships
Win	14–3	David Habat	MD 16–6	March 21–23, 2013	2013 NCAA Division I Wrestling Championships
2012 NCAA Championships (silver) at 133 lbs
Loss	13–3	Logan Stieber	3–4	March 15–17, 2012	2012 NCAA Division I Wrestling Championships
Win	13–2	Bernard Futrell	8–2	March 15–17, 2012	2012 NCAA Division I Wrestling Championships
Win	12–2	Zach Stevens	Fall	March 15–17, 2012	2012 NCAA Division I Wrestling Championships
Win	11–2	Shelton Mack	Fall	March 15–17, 2012	2012 NCAA Division I Wrestling Championships
Win	10–2	Frank Martellotti	Fall	March 15–17, 2012	2012 NCAA Division I Wrestling Championships
2011 NCAA Championships (gold) at 133 lbs
Win	9–2	Andrew Hochstrasser	8–4	March 17–19, 2011	2011 NCAA Division I Wrestling Championships
Win	8–2	Tyler Graff	5–2	March 17–19, 2011	2011 NCAA Division I Wrestling Championships
Win	7–2	Mike Grey	MD 10–2	March 17–19, 2011	2011 NCAA Division I Wrestling Championships
Win	6–2	Levi Mele	Fall	March 17–19, 2011	2011 NCAA Division I Wrestling Championships
Win	5–2	Tyler Small	Fall	March 17–19, 2011	2011 NCAA Division I Wrestling Championships
2010 NCAA Championships 4th at 133 lbs
Loss	4–2	Franklin Gómez	MD 0–8	March 18–20, 2010	2010 NCAA Division I Wrestling Championships
Win	4–1	Dan Mitcheff	4–3	March 18–20, 2010	2010 NCAA Division I Wrestling Championships
Loss	3–1	Jayson Ness	TB 0–1	March 18–20, 2010	2010 NCAA Division I Wrestling Championships
Win	3–0	Borislav Novachkov	TB 5–4	March 18–20, 2010	2010 NCAA Division I Wrestling Championships
Win	2–0	Dave Marble	6–4	March 18–20, 2010	2010 NCAA Division I Wrestling Championships
Win	1–0	Zach Stevens	3–2	March 18–20, 2010	2010 NCAA Division I Wrestling Championships
