= Jaydin Eierman =

American freestyle wrestler

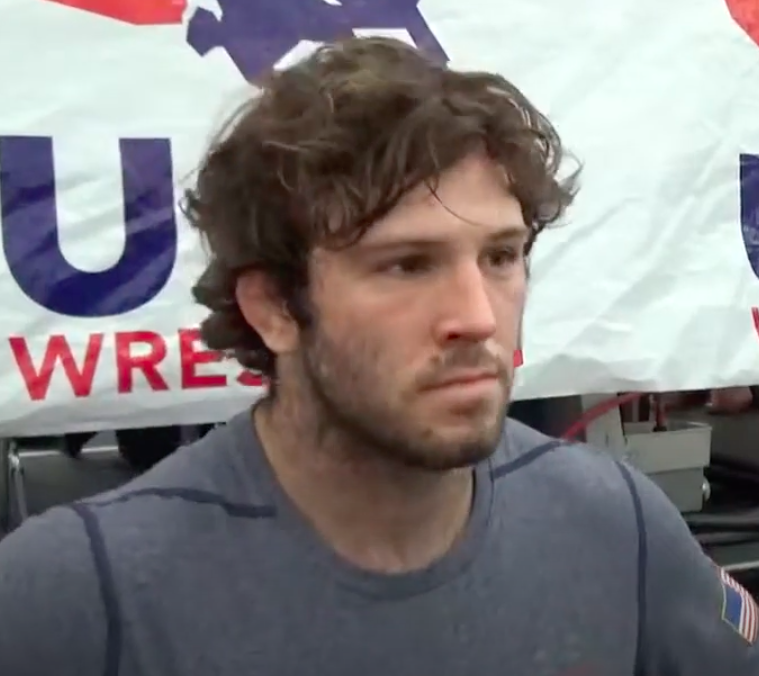
- Eierman in 2019

Personal information
- Born: Jaydin Selsor Clayton; May 2, 1996 (age 30) Columbia, Missouri, U.S.
- Height: 5 ft 8 in (173 cm)
- Weight: 65 kg (143 lb); 141 lb (64 kg)

Sport
- Country: United States
- Sport: Amateur wrestling
- Event: Freestyle
Medal record
Men's freestyle wrestling
Representing the United States
Pan American Games
Bronze medal – third place	2019 Lima	65 kg
Men's collegiate wrestling
Representing the Iowa Hawkeyes
NCAA Division I Championships
Silver medal – second place	2021 St. Louis	141 lb
Big Ten Championships
Gold medal – first place	2021 State College	141 lb
Silver medal – second place	2022 Lincoln	141 lb
Representing the Missouri Tigers
NCAA Division I Championships
Bronze medal – third place	2019 Pittsburgh	141 lb
MAC Championships
Gold medal – first place	2017 Cedar Falls	141 lb
Gold medal – first place	2018 Mt. Pleasant	141 lb
Gold medal – first place	2019 Norfolk	141 lb

Jaydin Selsor Eierman (né Clayton: born on May 2, 1996, in Columbia, Missouri) is an American freestyle and folkstyle wrestler who competed internationally at 65 kilograms and collegiately at 141 pounds. In freestyle, Eierman won the US Open Nationals in 2021, medaled at the 2019 Pan American Games, earned runner–up honors at the 2018 US Open Nationals and was the 2019 US U23 National Champion. In folkstyle, he was the 2021 NCAA DI National runner-up and won a Big Ten championship in 2021 for the University of Iowa. He was a three–time NCAA All-American and a three–time MAC champion for the Missouri Tigers, before transferring to Iowa.

== Folkstyle career ==
=== High school ===
Eierman was born to Heather Thurston in Columbia, Missouri, where he attended Tolton High School. As a high schooler, Eierman went on to become the second undefeated wrestler in the history of Missouri to claim four MSHSAA titles in four years of varsity. Entering his senior year, he committed to the Missouri Tigers. After graduation, Jaydin changed his last name Clayton to Eierman, honoring his life-long coach Mike Eierman.

=== College ===
==== University of Missouri ====
In his first season ('15–'16), Eierman was redshirted and compiled a 22–2 record at 133 pounds competing unattached in open tournaments. As a freshman, he moved up to 141 pounds and went on to compile a 29–7 record, claimed a Mid-American Conference title and placed fifth at the NCAAs, becoming an All-American. As a sophomore, Eierman improved his record to 34–3, repeated as the MAC champion and went on to place fourth at the NCAA championships. In his final year officially competing as a Tiger, Eierman racked up a 28–4 record, won his last MAC title (named Outstanding Wrestler) and went on to keep improving his position as an All-American at Nationals, placing third. For 2019–2020, Eierman took an Olympic redshirt. As a Tiger, Eierman went 89–14 overall.

==== University of Iowa ====
In November 2019, Eierman transferred to the University of Iowa. Coming back to folkstyle, Eierman went 5–0 during regular season, with notable wins over Anthony Echemendia from Ohio State, Chad Red from Nebraska and Dylan Duncan from Illinois. On February 8, it was announced that the Iowa Hawkeyes wrestling team had suspended all team related activities during regular season due to COVID-19 results. At the B1G Championships, Eierman made it to the finals with another win over Chad Red, and defeated Penn State's Nick Lee to claim the title, also helping the Hawkeyes claim the team championship. At the NCAAs, Eierman got notable falls to make his first final, defeating ninth-seeded Dresden Simon and fourth seeded Tariq Wilson. In a razor close match against finalist Nick Lee, in overtime, Eierman was defeated by Lee, claiming runner-up honors and helping to Iowa's first team title in 11 years. He received the 2021 Wade Schalles Award for best collegiate pinner. As the NCAA granted winter athletes one more year of eligibility due to the COVID-19 pandemic, Eierman came back for the 2021–2022 season, as a sixth-year senior.

== Freestyle career ==
=== 2017–2018 ===
During his first years competing in senior freestyle, Eierman most notably placed second at the 2018 US Open and third at the 2018 US World Team Trials. He also competed internationally, placing eight at the Polish Open.

=== 2019–2021 ===
Eierman started off 2019 by placing fifth at the US Open and the US World Team Trials and followed up by becoming the US U23 National Champion and representative for the U23 World Championships. Four days before the event, it was announced that Eierman would replace Zain Retherford and attend the 2019 Pan American Games, in which he ended up bringing a bronze medal to the United States. He went on to place eight at the U23 World Championships. In 2020, Eierman placed fifth at the US National Championships, and earned the biggest win of his career when he defeated World and Olympic champion Vladimer Khinchegashvili at the HWC Showdown Open. In May 2, 2021, Eierman claimed his first US Open National Championship.

== Freestyle record ==
Senior Freestyle Matches
Res.	Record	Opponent	Score	Date	Event	Location
2021 US Open (gold) at 65 kg
Win	41–20	(United States) Dom Demas	8–4	May 1–2, 2021	2021 US Open National Championships	(United States) Coralville, Iowa
Win	40–20	(United States) Luke Pletcher	9–5	May 1–2, 2021	2021 US Open National Championships	(United States) Coralville, Iowa
Win	39–20	(United States) Noah Hermosillo	Fall	May 1–2, 2021	2021 US Open National Championships	(United States) Coralville, Iowa
Win	38–20	(United States) Justin Benjamin	TF 18–8	May 1–2, 2021	2021 US Open National Championships	(United States) Coralville, Iowa
Win	37–20	(Georgia (country)) Vladimer Khinchegashvili	4–1	November 1, 2020	HWC Showdown Open	(United States) Iowa City, Iowa
2020 US Nationals 5th at 65 kg
Loss	36–20	(United States) Joey McKenna	TF 0–10	October 10–11, 2020	2020 US Senior National Championships	(United States) Coralville, Iowa
Loss	36–19	(United States) Evan Henderson	5–13	October 10–11, 2020	2020 US Senior National Championships	(United States) Coralville, Iowa
Win	36–18	(United States) Matthew Kolodzik	6–5	October 10–11, 2020	2020 US Senior National Championships	(United States) Coralville, Iowa
Win	35–18	(United States) Ethan Lizak	Fall	October 10–11, 2020	2020 US Senior National Championships	(United States) Coralville, Iowa
Win	34–18	(United States) Jordin Humphrey	TF 11–0	October 10–11, 2020	2020 US Senior National Championships	(United States) Coralville, Iowa
Win	33–18	(United States) Joey Jones	TF 10–0	October 10–11, 2020	2020 US Senior National Championships	(United States) Coralville, Iowa
2019 US Nationals DNP at 65 kg
Loss	32–18	(United States) Frank Molinaro	2–8	December 20–22, 2019	2019 US Senior National Championships	(United States) Fort Worth, Texas
Win	32–17	(United States) Rob Mathers	16–15	December 20–22, 2019	2019 US Senior National Championships	(United States) Fort Worth, Texas
Loss	31–17	(United States) Nick Lee	6–10	December 20–22, 2019	2019 US Senior National Championships	(United States) Fort Worth, Texas
Win	31–16	(United States) Ali Yousefi	TF 13–0	December 20–22, 2019	2019 US Senior National Championships	(United States) Fort Worth, Texas
2019 U23 World Championships 8th at 65 kg
Loss	30–16	(Kyrgyzstan) Ernazar Akmataliev	13–13	October 29, 2019	2019 U23 World Championships	Budapest, Hungary
Win	30–15	(Iran) Abolfazl Hajipouramiji	Fall	October 29, 2019	2019 U23 World Championships	Budapest, Hungary
2019 Pan American Games (bronze) at 65 kg
Win	29–15	(Argentina) Agustín Destribats	TF 15–4	August 9, 2019	2019 Pan American Games	Lima, Peru
Loss	28–15	(Cuba) Alejandro Valdés	TF 0–10	August 9, 2019	2019 Pan American Games	Lima, Peru
2019 US U23 Nationals and World Team Trials (gold) at 65 kg
Win	28–14	(United States) Luke Pletcher	9–6	May 31 – June 2, 2019	2019 US U23 National Championships – World Team Trials	(United States) Akron, Ohio
Loss	27–14	(United States) Luke Pletcher	11–12	May 31 – June 2, 2019	2019 US U23 National Championships – World Team Trials	(United States) Akron, Ohio
Win	27–13	(United States) Luke Pletcher	8–5	May 31 – June 2, 2019	2019 US U23 National Championships – World Team Trials	(United States) Akron, Ohio
Win	26–13	(United States) Kanen Storr	3–2	May 31 – June 2, 2019	2019 US U23 National Championships – World Team Trials	(United States) Akron, Ohio
Win	25–13	(United States) Carter Happel	TF 12–1	May 31 – June 2, 2019	2019 US U23 National Championships – World Team Trials	(United States) Akron, Ohio
Win	24–13	(United States) John Burger	TF 14–4	May 31 – June 2, 2019	2019 US U23 National Championships – World Team Trials	(United States) Akron, Ohio
Win	23–13	(United States) Alex Hrisopoulos	TF 12–2	May 31 – June 2, 2019	2019 US U23 National Championships – World Team Trials	(United States) Akron, Ohio
Win	22–13	(United States) Christopher Lawley	TF 10–0	May 31 – June 2, 2019	2019 US U23 National Championships – World Team Trials	(United States) Akron, Ohio
2019 US World Team Trials 5th at 65 kg
Loss	21–13	(United States) Frank Molinaro	8–10	May 17–19, 2019	2019 US World Team Trials Challenge	(United States) Raleigh, North Carolina
Win	21–12	(United States) Dom Demas	20–15	May 17–19, 2019	2019 US World Team Trials Challenge	(United States) Raleigh, North Carolina
Win	20–12	(United States) Dean Heil	TF 13–2	May 17–19, 2019	2019 US World Team Trials Challenge	(United States) Raleigh, North Carolina
Loss	19–12	(United States) Frank Molinaro	7–11	May 17–19, 2019	2019 US World Team Trials Challenge	(United States) Raleigh, North Carolina
2019 US Open 5th at 65 kg
Loss	19–11	(United States) Frank Molinaro	5–8	April 24–27, 2019	2019 US Open National Championships	(United States) Las Vegas, Nevada
Loss	19–10	(United States) Zain Retherford	3–11	April 24–27, 2019	2019 US Open National Championships	(United States) Las Vegas, Nevada
Win	19–9	(United States) Dean Heil	Fall	April 24–27, 2019	2019 US Open National Championships	(United States) Las Vegas, Nevada
Win	18–9	(United States) Bryce Meredith	Fall	April 24–27, 2019	2019 US Open National Championships	(United States) Las Vegas, Nevada
Win	17–9	(United States) Joey Ward	8–5	April 24–27, 2019	2019 US Open National Championships	(United States) Las Vegas, Nevada
Win	16–9	(United States) Kyle Todrank	TF 10–0	April 24–27, 2019	2019 US Open National Championships	(United States) Las Vegas, Nevada
2018 Poland Open 8th at 65 kg
Loss	15–9	(Romania) George Bucur	TF 10–21	September 7–9, 2018	2018 Poland Open	Warsaw, Poland
Win	15–8	(Georgia (country)) Beka Lomtadze	Fall	September 7–9, 2018	2018 Poland Open	Warsaw, Poland
2018 US World Team Trials (bronze) at 65 kg
Win	14–8	(United States) Andy Simmons	9–5	June 22–23, 2018	2018 Final X: Lehigh - True thirds	(United States) Bethlehem, Pennsylvania
Loss	13–8	(United States) Logan Stieber	1–7	May 18–20, 2018	2018 US World Team Trials Challenge	(United States) Rochester, Minnesota
Loss	13–7	(United States) Logan Stieber	5–10	May 18–20, 2018	2018 US World Team Trials Challenge	(United States) Rochester, Minnesota
Win	13–6	(United States) Jayson Ness	Fall	May 18–20, 2018	2018 US World Team Trials Challenge	(United States) Rochester, Minnesota
2018 US Open (silver) at 65 kg
Loss	12–6	(United States) Joey McKenna	3–7	April 24–28, 2018	2018 US Open National Championships	(United States) Las Vegas, Nevada
Win	12–5	(United States) Nick Dardanes	TF 10–0	April 24–28, 2018	2018 US Open National Championships	(United States) Las Vegas, Nevada
Win	11–5	(United States) Logan Stieber	6–5	April 24–28, 2018	2018 US Open National Championships	(United States) Las Vegas, Nevada
Win	10–5	(United States) Jayson Ness	7–4	April 24–28, 2018	2018 US Open National Championships	(United States) Las Vegas, Nevada
Win	9–5	(United States) Jake Tanenbaum	TF 14–4	April 24–28, 2018	2018 US Open National Championships	(United States) Las Vegas, Nevada
2017 US U23 World Team Trials (bronze) at 65 kg
Win	8–5	(United States) Brock Zacherl	5–4	October 7–8, 2017	2017 US U23 World Team Trials	(United States) Rochester, Minnesota
Win	7–5	(United States) Matt Findlay	Fall	October 7–8, 2017	2017 US U23 World Team Trials	(United States) Rochester, Minnesota
Loss	6–5	(United States) Boo Lewallen	TF 5–15	October 7–8, 2017	2017 US U23 World Team Trials	(United States) Rochester, Minnesota
Win	6–4	(United States) Devin Tortorice	TF 11–1	October 7–8, 2017	2017 US U23 World Team Trials	(United States) Rochester, Minnesota
Win	5–4	(United States) Logan Smith	TF 11–0	October 7–8, 2017	2017 US U23 World Team Trials	(United States) Rochester, Minnesota
2017 US World Team Trials DNP at 65 kg
Loss	4–4	(United States) Kellen Russell	TF 0–10	June 9–10, 2017	2017 US World Team Trials Challenge	(United States) Lincoln, Nebraska
Loss	4–3	(United States) Zain Retherford	TF 2–14	June 9–10, 2017	2017 US World Team Trials Challenge	(United States) Lincoln, Nebraska
2017 US Last Chance Qualifier WTT (silver) at 65 kg
Loss	4–2	(United States) Mario Mason	8–11	May 19–22, 2017	2017 US Last Chance Qualifier World Team Trials	(United States) Rochester, Minnesota
Win	4–1	(United States) Anthony Abidin	Fall	May 19–22, 2017	2017 US Last Chance Qualifier World Team Trials	(United States) Rochester, Minnesota
Win	3–1	(United States) Michael Prieto	TF 11–0	May 19–22, 2017	2017 US Last Chance Qualifier World Team Trials	(United States) Rochester, Minnesota
2017 US Open DNP at 65 kg
Loss	2–1	(United States) Nick Dardanes	TF 6–17	April 24–27, 2017	2017 US Open National Championships	(United States) Las Vegas, Nevada
Win	2–0	(United States) Devin Reynolds	TF 16–6	April 24–27, 2017	2017 US Open National Championships	(United States) Las Vegas, Nevada
Win	1–0	(United States) Leroy Barnes	TF 10–0	April 24–27, 2017	2017 US Open National Championships	(United States) Las Vegas, Nevada
NC	0–0	(United States) Jordan Oliver	NC (overturned)	April 24–27, 2017	2017 US Open National Championships	(United States) Las Vegas, Nevada

== NCAA record ==
NCAA Championships Matches
Res.	Record	Opponent	Score	Date	Event
2021 NCAA Championships (silver) at 141 lbs
Loss	18–6	Nick Lee	SV 2–4	March 18–20, 2021	2021 NCAA Division I Wrestling Championships
Win	18–5	Tariq Wilson	Fall	March 18–20, 2021	2021 NCAA Division I Wrestling Championships
Win	17–5	Dresden Simon	Fall	March 18–20, 2021	2021 NCAA Division I Wrestling Championships
Win	16–5	Cole Matthews	5–3	March 18–20, 2021	2021 NCAA Division I Wrestling Championships
Win	15–5	Cayden Rooks	TF 20–5	March 18–20, 2021	2021 NCAA Division I Wrestling Championships
2019 NCAA Championships (bronze) at 141 lbs
Win	14–5	Dom Demas	2–0	March 21–23, 2019	2019 NCAA Division I Wrestling Championships
Win	13–5	Mitch McKee	8–5	March 21–23, 2019	2019 NCAA Division I Wrestling Championships
Loss	12–5	Yianni Diakomihalis	5–6	March 21–23, 2019	2019 NCAA Division I Wrestling Championships
Win	12–4	Kyle Shoop	8–3	March 21–23, 2019	2019 NCAA Division I Wrestling Championships
Win	11–4	Cameron Kelly	10–8	March 21–23, 2019	2019 NCAA Division I Wrestling Championships
Win	10–4	Chris Debien	Fall	March 21–23, 2019	2019 NCAA Division I Wrestling Championships
2018 NCAA Championships 4th at 141 lbs
Loss	9–4	Joey McKenna	2–7	March 15–17, 2018	2018 NCAA Division I Wrestling Championships
Win	9–3	Nick Lee	MD 12–4	March 15–17, 2018	2018 NCAA Division I Wrestling Championships
Loss	8–3	Yianni Diakomihalis	SV–1 4–6	March 15–17, 2018	2018 NCAA Division I Wrestling Championships
Win	8–2	Brock Zacherl	Fall	March 15–17, 2018	2018 NCAA Division I Wrestling Championships
Win	7–2	Eli Stickley	Fall	March 15–17, 2018	2018 NCAA Division I Wrestling Championships
Win	6–2	Austin Headlee	12–6	March 15–17, 2018	2018 NCAA Division I Wrestling Championships
2017 NCAA Championships 5th at 141 lbs
Win	5–2	Anthony Ashnault	5–2	March 16–18, 2017	2017 NCAA Division I Wrestling Championships
Loss	4–2	Bryce Meredith	4–8	March 16–18, 2017	2017 NCAA Division I Wrestling Championships
Win	4–1	Matt Kolodzik	6–2	March 16–18, 2017	2017 NCAA Division I Wrestling Championships
Win	3–1	Joey McKenna	MD 8–0	March 16–18, 2017	2017 NCAA Division I Wrestling Championships
Loss	2–1	Dean Heil	5–6	March 16–18, 2017	2017 NCAA Division I Wrestling Championships
Win	2–0	Colton McCrystal	9–6	March 16–18, 2017	2017 NCAA Division I Wrestling Championships
Win	1–0	Logan Everett	MD 15–3	March 16–18, 2017	2017 NCAA Division I Wrestling Championships

=== Stats ===
Season	Year	School	Rank	Weigh Class	Record	Win	Bonus
2021	Senior	University of Iowa	#1 (2nd)	141	12–1	92.31%	61.54%
2019	Junior	University of Missouri	#5 (3rd)	141	28–4	87.50%	62.50%
2018	Sophomore	University of Missouri	#2 (4th)	141	34–3	91.89%	70.27%
2017	Freshman	University of Missouri	#8 (5th)	141	29–7	80.56%	44.44%
Career					103–15	87.29%	61.02%
