= Bryce Meredith =

American collegiate wrestler and mixed martial artist

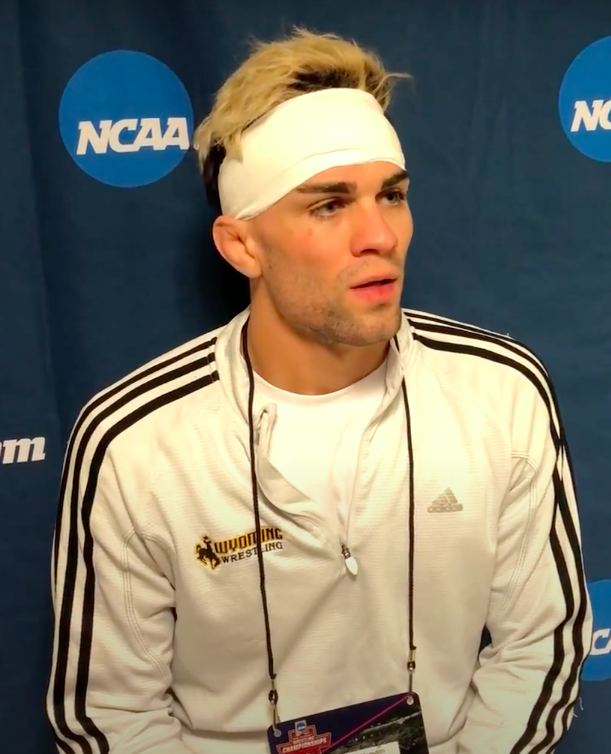
- Meredith in 2018
- Born: Bryce Robert Meredith; April 29, 1995 (age 31); Cheyenne, Wyoming, U.S.
- Other names: Misfit
- Height: 5 ft 8 in (1.73 m)
- Weight: 135 lb (61 kg; 9.6 st)
- Division: Bantamweight (2021–present)
- Fighting out of: Phoenix, Arizona, U.S.
- Team: MMA Lab
- Wrestling: NCAA Division I Wrestling
- Years active: 2021–present

Mixed martial arts record
- Total: 9
- Wins: 8
- By knockout: 2
- By submission: 3
- By decision: 3
- Losses: 1
- By knockout: 1

Other information
- University: University of Wyoming
- Notable school: Cheyenne Central High School
- Mixed martial arts record from Sherdog

Bryce Robert Meredith (born April 29, 1995) is an American professional mixed martial artist, former freestyle and graduated folkstyle wrestler who currently competes in the bantamweight division. He has previously competed for Bellator MMA. In college, where he competed at 141 pounds, he was a three–time NCAA Division I All–American and the 2018 Big 12 Conference champion out of the University of Wyoming.

== Wrestling career ==
=== High school ===
Meredith attended Cheyenne Central High School in the state of Wyoming. He went on to become a four-time state (WHSAA) champion with a record of 123 wins and 8 defeats. He was also a four-time NHSCA All-American and was ranked amongst the top-100 recruits in the country.

=== University ===
==== NC State ====
Meredith then committed to North Carolina State University as a class of 2014 recruit. He competed for just one season as a Wolfpack at 133 pounds (14'-15') and compiled 15 wins and 6 losses during regular season, but was not on the starting lineup for the NCAA championships.

==== University of Wyoming ====
After just one year attending NCSU, he transferred to his home state, Wyoming. His coaches from both universities explain that Meredith was feeling homesick and it was affecting him and his performance.

As a sophomore ('15-'16), he quickly made a difference from last year, going up in the rankings from #31 to #5, finishing the season with 29 wins and 5 losses and winning a bronze medal at the Big 12 Conference. Despite his accomplishments during regular season, Meredith was an underdog at the NCAA tournament. As the fourteenth seed, he went on to defeat the second, third and sixth seeds to make it to the finals, where he faced the top–seed and eventual two–time NCAA champion Dean Heil and lost by points. This marked Meredith in the history of the program as the first finalist since 1996.

As a junior ('16-'17), he opened up the season with a Northern Colorado Open title and compiled a dual-meet record of 11–3. In the post-season, he made the finals of the Big 12s where he faced Dean Heil, whom he had lost to at last year's NCAA finals. He was once again defeated on points, earning runner–up honors and an automatic qualification ticket for the NCAAs. At the tournament, he was the number ten seed and as such, he defeated three opponents including the second seed before falling to the sixth seeded wrestler in the semifinals. Due to his last match's result, he was thrown to the semifinals of the consolation bracket, where he defeated Jaydin Eierman to make it to the bronze medal match, where he was pinned by the second seed, whom he had beaten before, placing fourth.

Meredith had his most successful season as a senior ('17–'18). He opened up with a victory over ninth–ranked Chad Red from Nebraska and then went on to compete at the Cliff Keen Invitational, where he lost to two–time Cadet World Champion and fifth seed Yianni Diakomihalis in the semifinals and placed third. He then dominated the rest of the regular season, claiming an RTOC title (named Outstanding Wrestler) and posting a 16–0 record at duals, with notable wins over top–ranked Seth Gross, second–ranked Jaydin Eierman and two–time defending NCAA champion Dean Heil. In the post–season, he once again defeated Heil in the Big 12 finals to claim his first title of the tournament. He entered the NCAA championships as the top–seed and defeated three unseeded opponents until the semifinals, where he defeated Joey McKenna to reach the finale. He lost his final match against Yianni Diakomihalis, the only man to beat Meredith as a senior. Overall, Meredith became a two–time NCAA finalist, three–time All-American and a Big 12 champion with a record of 108 wins and 21 losses.

=== Freestyle ===
==== 2018–2019 ====
Meredith made his senior level debut in Russia in December 2018 at the prestigious Alans International, where he lost his only match. A month later (January 2019), he competed at the Dave Schultz Memorial International and claimed a bronze medal, after losing his semifinal match and defeating two other wrestlers in the consolation bracket. He then made an appearance at the US Open in April, where he went 2–2 and did not place. After his performance at the US Open, he attended the Last Chance Qualifier for the World Team Trials In an attempt to make the team, but was stopped by Dean Heil. Seven months later, he competed at the Bill Farrell International, failing to place.

In his last tournament of the year, Meredith went on to compete at the US Nationals of December, where he performed outstandingly in comparison to his last appearances. He opened up by tech'ing multiple–time age–group national champion Josh Saunders and once again two–time NCAA champion Dean Heil before being stopped himself by eventual winner of the tournament Jordan Oliver. He then continued to tech his competition in the consolation bracket, once again defeating Saunders and also three–time All-American Ethan Lizak before being defeated himself by two–time Cadet World Champion and reigning NCAA champion Yianni Diakomihalis. He was defeated again by Olympian Frank Molinaro in a close 6–7 decision to place sixth, failing to qualify for the 2020 US Olympic Team Trials.

==== 2020 ====
Meredith travelled to Cuba to attend the Granma y Cerro Pelado International in February. He started up with a win but went on to lose his next two matches before winning the bronze–medal match.

After being unable to compete due to the COVID-19 pandemic until October, Meredith downed recently graduated high schooler Beau Bartlett on October 20 at the NLWC II on points in a high–pace and close match (8–6) and Iowa standout Austin DeSanto on November 1 at the HWC Showdown Open, by points (11–3). On November 24 at the WRTC Underground I, Meredith was defeated in a frenetic and close match by NCAA champion Seth Gross, seven points to ten. He then competed at the Flo 8-Man Challenge: 150 lbs on December 18, where he was eliminated in the first round by World Championship runner–up (70kg) James Green.

==== 2026 ====
Meredith debuted for Real American Freestyle (RAF) at RAF 06 on February 28, losing to Andrew Alirez by technical fall.

== Mixed martial arts career ==
=== Early career ===
After graduating from the University of Wyoming, Meredith announced his intentions of competing in mixed martial arts. Meredith made his professional debut on May 21, 2021, at LFA 108, in a bantamweight bout against Steven Merrill, where despite facing early adversity by being dropped, he was able to pound his way into a technical knockout victory in the first round.

In his sophomore performance on April 8, 2022, at LFA 128, Meredith defeated Jay Viola via technical knockout in the third round.

Meredith faced Nathan Fought on September 9, 2022, at LFA 141, defeating him via rear-naked choke in the first round.

=== Bellator MMA / Professional Fighters League ===
On February 14, 2023, it was announced that Meredith had signed a multi-fight deal with Bellator MMA and would make his debut on March 31, 2023, at Bellator 293 against Brandon Carrillo. He won the fight by a rear-naked choke submission in the first round.

Meredith faced Miguel Peimbert on October 7, 2023, at Bellator 300. He won the fight via unanimous decision.

Meredith debuted with the Professional Fighters League (PFL) at PFL 1 on April 4, 2024, and won his bout against Ty Johnson by unanimous decision.

Meredith returned to Bellator to face John MaCalolooy on September 7, 2024, at Bellator Champions Series 4. He won the fight via technical submission due to a rear-naked choke in the first round.

Meredith faced Lazaro Dayron at PFL 10, on August 21, 2025. He lost the bout via technical knockout in the third round.

Meredith was scheduled to face Jack Cartwright on March 28, 2026, at PFL Pittsburgh. However, Meredith withdrew from the bout and was replaced by Allan Begosso.

The re-scheduled bout between Meredith and Cartwright was scheduled to take place on July 25, 2026, at PFL Washington DC. However, Cartwright pulled out and was replaced by Michael Cyr. Meredith won the fight via unanimous decision.

== Mixed martial arts record ==
Professional record breakdown
9 matches	8 wins	1 loss
By knockout	2	1
By submission	3	0
By decision	3	0

Res.	Record	Opponent	Method	Event	Date	Round	Time	Location	Notes
Win	8–1	Michael Cyr	Decision (unanimous)	PFL Washington DC: Jean vs. Rodriguez	July 25, 2026	3	5:00	Washington, D.C., United States	Catchweight (140 lb) bout.
Loss	7–1	Lazaro Dayron	TKO (punches)	PFL 10 (2025)	August 21, 2025	3	4:06	Hollywood, Florida, United States	
Win	7–0	John MaCalolooy	Technical Submission (rear-naked choke)	Bellator Champions Series 4	September 7, 2024	1	3:15	San Diego, California, United States	
Win	6–0	Ty Johnson	Decision (unanimous)	PFL 1 (2024)	April 4, 2024	3	5:00	San Antonio, Texas, United States	
Win	5–0	Miguel Peimbert	Decision (unanimous)	Bellator 300	October 7, 2023	3	5:00	San Diego, California, United States	
Win	4–0	Brandon Carrillo	Submission (rear-naked choke)	Bellator 293	March 31, 2023	2	3:11	Temecula, California, United States	
Win	3–0	Nathan Fought	Submission (rear-naked choke)	LFA 141	September 9, 2022	1	4:36	Vail, Colorado, United States	Catchweight (139.8 lb) bout; Fought missed weight.
Win	2–0	Jay Viola	TKO (punches)	LFA 128	April 8, 2022	3	1:04	Sioux Falls, South Dakota, United States	Catchweight (140 lb) bout.
Win	1–0	Steven Merrill	TKO (punches)	LFA 108	May 21, 2021	1	3:55	Sioux Falls, South Dakota, United States	Bantamweight debut.

== Freestyle record ==
Senior Freestyle Matches
Res.	Record	Opponent	Score	Date	Event	Location
Loss	18–15	(United States) Andrew Alirez	TF 2–13	February 28, 2026	RAF 06	(United States) Tempe, Arizona
Flo 8-Man Challenge DNP at 150 lbs
Loss	18–14	(United States) James Green	TF 0–10	December 18, 2020	Flo 8-Man Challenge: 150 lbs	(United States) Austin, Texas
Loss	18–13	(United States) Seth Gross	7–10	November 24, 2020	WRTC Underground I	(United States) Madison, Wisconsin
Win	18–12	(United States) Austin DeSanto	11–3	November 1, 2020	HWC Showdown Open	(United States) Iowa City, Iowa
Win	17–12	(United States) Beau Bartlett	8–6	October 20, 2020	NLWC II	(United States) State College, Pennsylvania
2020 Granma y Cerro Pelado (bronze) at 65 kg
Win	16–12			February 9–17, 2020	2020 Granma y Cerro Pelado	Havana, Cuba
Loss	15–12	(Cuba) Cristian Solenzal	TF 0–11	February 9–17, 2020	2020 Granma y Cerro Pelado	Havana, Cuba
Loss	15–11	(Cuba) Alejandro Valdés	TF 0–10	February 9–17, 2020	2020 Granma y Cerro Pelado	Havana, Cuba
Win	15–10	(Cuba) Hernandez	4–0	February 9–17, 2020	2020 Granma y Cerro Pelado	Havana, Cuba
2019 US Nationals 6th at 65 kg
Loss	14–10	(United States) Frank Molinaro	6–7	December 20–22, 2019	2019 US Senior Nationals - US Olympic Trials Qualifier	(United States) Fort Worth, Texas
Loss	14–9	(United States) Yianni Diakomihalis	TF 0–10	December 20–22, 2019	2019 US Senior Nationals - US Olympic Trials Qualifier	(United States) Fort Worth, Texas
Win	14–8	(United States) Josh Saunders	TF 16–6	December 20–22, 2019	2019 US Senior Nationals - US Olympic Trials Qualifier	(United States) Fort Worth, Texas
Win	13–8	(United States) Ethan Lizak	TF 10–0	December 20–22, 2019	2019 US Senior Nationals - US Olympic Trials Qualifier	(United States) Fort Worth, Texas
Loss	12–8	(United States) Jordan Oliver	TF 0–10	December 20–22, 2019	2019 US Senior Nationals - US Olympic Trials Qualifier	(United States) Fort Worth, Texas
Win	12–7	(United States) Dean Heil	TF 18–8	December 20–22, 2019	2019 US Senior Nationals - US Olympic Trials Qualifier	(United States) Fort Worth, Texas
Win	11–7	(United States) Josh Saunders	TF 11–1	December 20–22, 2019	2019 US Senior Nationals - US Olympic Trials Qualifier	(United States) Fort Worth, Texas
2019 Bill Farrell Memorial at 65 kg
Loss	10–7	(United States) Evan Henderson	TF 0–10	November 15–16, 2019	2019 Bill Farrell Memorial International Open	(United States) New York City, New York
Win	10–6	(United States) Dean Heil	TF 18–7	November 15–16, 2019	2019 Bill Farrell Memorial International Open	(United States) New York City, New York
Loss	9–6	(United States) Jordan Oliver	TF 0–11	November 15–16, 2019	2019 Bill Farrell Memorial International Open	(United States) New York City, New York
Win	9–5	(United States) Earl Hall	TF 13–3	November 15–16, 2019	2019 Bill Farrell Memorial International Open	(United States) New York City, New York
Win	8–5	(Tajikistan) Rob Mathers	Fall	November 15–16, 2019	2019 Bill Farrell Memorial International Open	(United States) New York City, New York
2019 US Last Chance WTT DNP at 65 kg
Loss	7–5	(United States) Dean Heil	TF 0–10	May 5, 2019	2019 US Last Chance World Team Trials Qualifier	(United States) East Stroudsburg, Pennsylvania
Win	7–4	(United States) Ben Whitford	7–6	May 5, 2019	2019 US Last Chance World Team Trials Qualifier	(United States) East Stroudsburg, Pennsylvania
2019 US Open DNP at 65 kg
Loss	6–4	(United States) Joey McKenna	TF 0–10	April 24–27, 2019	2019 US Open National Championships	(United States) Las Vegas, Nevada
Win	6–3	(United States) Montell Marion	9–4	April 24–27, 2019	2019 US Open National Championships	(United States) Las Vegas, Nevada
Loss	5–3	(United States) Jaydin Eierman	Fall	April 24–27, 2019	2019 US Open National Championships	(United States) Las Vegas, Nevada
Win	5–2	(United States) Josh Finesilver	TF 10–0	April 24–27, 2019	2019 US Open National Championships	(United States) Las Vegas, Nevada
2019 Dave Schultz M. International (bronze) at 65 kg
Win	4–2	(United States) Andrew Alirez	7–2	January 24–26, 2019	2019 Dave Schultz Memorial International	(United States) Colorado Springs, Colorado
Win	3–2	(United States) Brandon Wright	6–4	January 24–26, 2019	2019 Dave Schultz Memorial International	(United States) Colorado Springs, Colorado
Loss	2–2	(United States) Bernard Futrell	TF 1–12	January 24–26, 2019	2019 Dave Schultz Memorial International	(United States) Colorado Springs, Colorado
Win	2–1	(United States) Andrew Alirez	8–7	January 24–26, 2019	2019 Dave Schultz Memorial International	(United States) Colorado Springs, Colorado
Win	1–1	(United States) Joshua Dziewa	TF 13–2	January 24–26, 2019	2019 Dave Schultz Memorial International	(United States) Colorado Springs, Colorado
2018 Alans 32nd at 65 kg
Loss	0–1	(Russia) Imam Adzhiev	TF 0–10	December 7–9, 2018	2018 Alans International	Vladikavkaz, Russia

== NCAA record ==
NCAA Championships Matches
Res.	Record	Opponent	Score	Date	Event
2018 NCAA Championships (silver) at 141 lbs
Loss	12–4	Yianni Diakomihalis	4–7	March 15–17, 2018	2018 NCAA Division I Wrestling Championships
Win	12–3	Joey McKenna	1–0	March 15–17, 2018	2018 NCAA Division I Wrestling Championships
Win	11–3	Sa`Derian Perry	Fall	March 15–17, 2018	2018 NCAA Division I Wrestling Championships
Win	10–3	Vincent Turk	5–2	March 15–17, 2018	2018 NCAA Division I Wrestling Championships
Win	9–3	Colton Schilling	5–1	March 15–17, 2018	2018 NCAA Division I Wrestling Championships
2017 NCAA Championships 4th at 141 lbs
Loss	8–3	Kevin Jack	Fall	March 16–18, 2017	2017 NCAA Division I Wrestling Championships
Win	8–2	Jaydin Eierman	8-–	March 16–18, 2017	2017 NCAA Division I Wrestling Championships
Loss	7–2	George DiCamillo	7–10	March 16–18, 2017	2017 NCAA Division I Wrestling Championships
Win	7–1	Kevin Jack	6–5	March 16–18, 2017	2017 NCAA Division I Wrestling Championships
Win	6–1	Johnathan Hathaway	MD 8–0	March 16–18, 2017	2017 NCAA Division I Wrestling Championships
Win	5–1	Mike Longo	MD 12–4	March 16–18, 2017	2017 NCAA Division I Wrestling Championships
2016 NCAA Championships (silver) at 141 lbs
Loss	4–1	Dean Heil	2–3	March 17–19, 2016	2016 NCAA Division I Wrestling Championships
Win	4–0	Joey McKenna	5–3	March 17–19, 2016	2016 NCAA Division I Wrestling Championships
Win	3–0	Micah Jordan	5–2	March 17–19, 2016	2016 NCAA Division I Wrestling Championships
Win	2–0	Kevin Jack	5–4	March 17–19, 2016	2016 NCAA Division I Wrestling Championships
Win	1–0	Robert Mathers	MD 16–3	March 17–19, 2016	2016 NCAA Division I Wrestling Championships

=== Stats ===
Season	Year	School	Rank	Weigh Class	Record	Win	Bonus
2018	Senior	University of Wyoming	#1 (2nd)	141	33–2	94.29%	51.43%
2017	Junior	University of Wyoming	#10 (4th)	141	31–8	79.49%	58.97%
2016	Sophomore	University of Wyoming	#14 (2nd)	141	29–5	85.29%	47.06%
2015	Freshman	North Carolina State University	#31 (DNQ)	133	15–6	71.43%	38-10%
Career					108–21	83.72%	50.39%

== See also ==
- List of male mixed martial artists
