= Sammy Sasso =

American wrestler (born 2000)

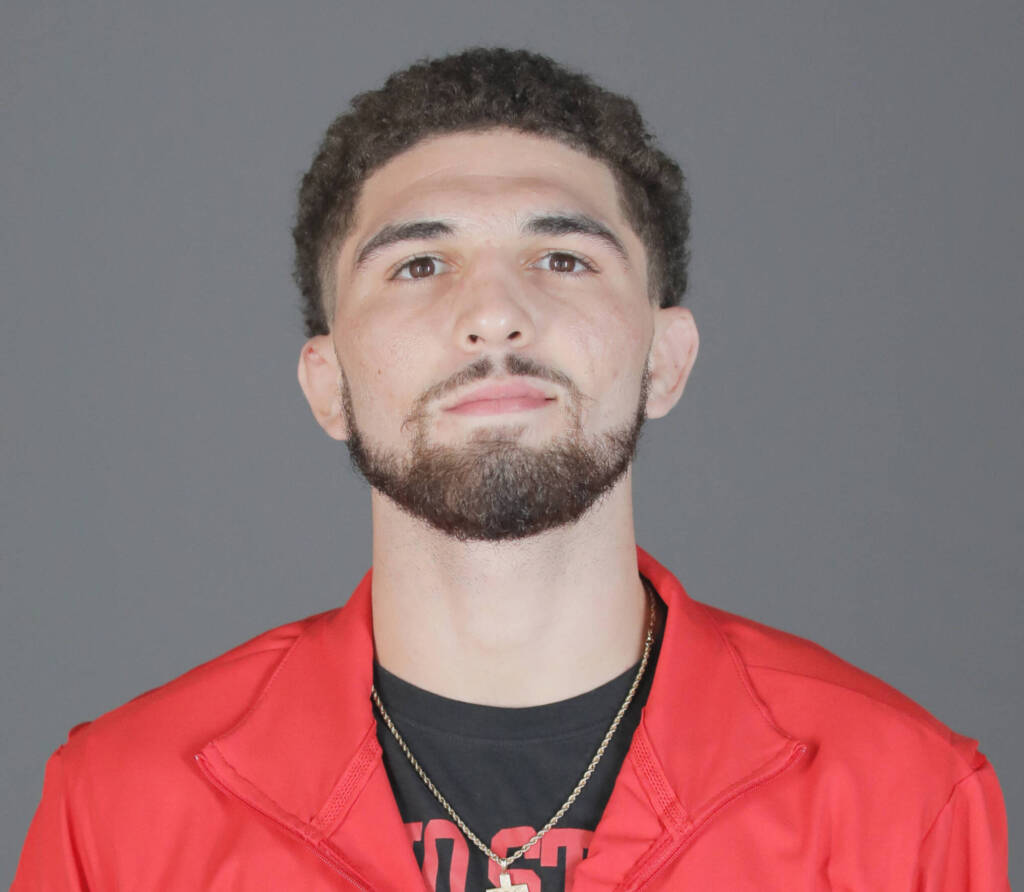
- 2020-2021 Season Headshot

Personal information
- Born: 20 April 2000 (age 26) Nazareth, Pennsylvania, U.S.
- Height: 5 ft 9 in (175 cm)

Sport
- Country: United States
- Sport: Wrestling
- Weight class: 149 lbs (70 kg)
- Event(s): Freestyle and Folkstyle
- College team: Ohio State
- Club: Titan Mercury Wrestling Club
Medal record
Collegiate Wrestling
Representing the Ohio State Buckeyes
NCAA Division I Championships
Silver medal – second place	2021 St. Louis	149 lb
Silver medal – second place	2023 Tulsa	149 lb
Bronze medal – third place	2022 Detroit	149 lb
Big Ten Championships
Gold medal – first place	2021 University Park	149 lb
Gold medal – first place	2023 Ann Arbor	149 lb
Silver medal – second place	2020 Piscataway	149 lb
Silver medal – second place	2022 Lincoln	149 lb

Sammy Sasso (born Samuel Sasso April 20, 2000) is an American freestyle and folkstyle wrestler who currently wrestles for The Ohio State University. As a collegiate athlete for Ohio State University, he's a four-time NCAA Division I All-American, and two-time Big Ten champion. In freestyle, he was a 2023 member of the USA Wrestling Senior National Team.

== High school ==
Sasso attended Nazareth Area High School in Nazareth, Pennsylvania from 2014 to 2018. During his time at Nazareth High School, Sammy Sasso established himself as a notable wrestler with a strong track record marked by skill and consistency. Sasso was a four-time Pennsylvania state place winner and two-time state champion at 138 lbs and 145 lbs. Sasso went 135-3 during his final three high school seasons and had an overall record of 180-11. He holds several records for Nazareth Area High School including: most takedowns per season (275), most takedowns per career (793), most pins per career (88), most wins per season (50), most career matches (191), and most career wins (180).

In addition, Sasso was an Ironman, Super 32, Beast of the East and Flo Nationals champion. In freestyle, he was a Cadet World Team Trials finalist and Fargo national champion. Prior to committing to Ohio State, Sasso was a top-5 national recruit according to FloWrestling.

== College ==
=== 2018-2019 Season ===
During his Redshirt (college sports) year Sasso accumulated a record of 19-2 with six pins, four technical falls, and a major decision, resulting in a 58% bonus rate. Sasso secured championship titles at both the Michigan State Open (F/S Division) and the Edinboro Open. Notably, he made a comeback after an initial defeat at the Midlands Championships, finishing in third place with seven consecutive victories. Among his victories were notable wins over opponents such as Josh Maruca, Josh Heil, Alec Pantaleo, and Pat Lugo, who had reached All-American status. His performance at the Edinboro Open included a 6-0 record with three pins, a technical fall, and a major decision. Sasso's achievements extended to winning the UWW Junior Freestyle National Championship (70 kg), earning him a place in the World Team Trials.

=== 2019-2020 Season ===
During Sasso's first year starting for Ohio State, he was named Wrestler of the Week by the Big Ten Conference and USA Wrestling after beating No. 2 Pat Lugo of University of Iowa and No. 4 Brayton Lee of University of Minnesota. The rest of the season, Sasso maintained an undefeated record of 9-0 in the Big Ten. In the post-season, he reached the title bout of the Big Ten Wrestling Championships, finishing second after a loss to Pat Lugo of Iowa University in a 2-1 decision. He earned the No. 3 seed for the NCAA Championships in the 149-pound weight class, but did not compete at the 2020 NCAA Division I Wrestling Championships after the season was cancelled due to the COVID-19 pandemic. Sasso finished the season with an overall record of 23-4.

=== 2020-2021 Season ===
During the 2020-2021 season, in his redshirt sophomore year, Sasso's season was characterized by victories, as he secured a 9-1 record against top 25-ranked opponents. His crowning achievement of the season came when he earned his first Big Ten title in the 149-pound weight class against Ridge Lovett of Nebraska. With his title, Sasso became the 56th individual Big Ten champion in Ohio State history.Due to this, Sasso earned the number 1-seed at the 2021 NCAA Division I Wrestling Championships in St. Louis. After beating all opponents to reach the title bout, Sasso wrestled Austin O'Connor of UNC in the finals. The match was tied at 1-1 after a quick escape in the third period, and Sasso had an advantage in riding time with 1:03. However, O'Connor scored a late takedown that seemed to change things. In the final moments a scramble led to what looked like a winning takedown by Sasso right at the edge of the mat as time ran out. Coach Ryan challenged the decision, but the review confirmed no takedown. Sasso took second place after a 3-2 decision against O'Connor. He finished the season with a 16-1 overall record and a 9-1 dual record.

=== 2021-2022 Season ===
In the 2021-22 season, Sammy Sasso, competing as a Redshirt Junior, continued to establish himself as a collegiate wrestler. Prior to the season, he garnered attention as the Preseason No. 2 contender at 149 pounds according to Intermat wrestling. In tournaments, he secured first place at the Ohio Intercollegiate Open, maintaining an undefeated 4-0 record in the competition. Additionally, Sasso performed strongly at the Cliff Keen Invitational, earning a second-place finish with a 3-1 record. In the regular season, he maintained his undefeated Big Ten duals record, finishing with a 12-0 record.

In the post-season, Sasso entered the Big Ten Wrestling Championships as the number 1-seed at 149 pounds. He wrestled his way through the bracket to the final bout, where he wrestled Austin Gomez of Wisconsin. The match began favorably for Sasso as he secured an early takedown, taking a 2-0 lead. However, Gomez managed to escape, reducing the lead to 2-1 by the end of the first period. In the second period, Gomez evened the score by escaping from the bottom and then executed a takedown, briefly giving him a 4-3 advantage. Sasso began the third period on the bottom and quickly escaped, tying the score at 4-4. However, Gomez secured another takedown shortly after, allowing Sasso to escape, resulting in a score of 6-5 in Gomez's favor. Sasso ultimately finished in second-place after an 8-5 loss against Gomez. At the NCAA Division I Wrestling Championships Sasso finished 5th with a 4-2 record.

=== 2022-2023 Season ===
During the 2022-2023 season, Sasso, a Redshirt Senior, began on a high note at the 2022 Michigan State Open, winning with 4-0 record in the Open Division.Prior to the regular season, Sasso also participated in the 2022 NWCA All-Classic in Austin, Texas, where he wrestled No. 2-ranked Austin Gomez in a closely contested match that ended 10-9. Sasso won the 149 pound bracket at the 2022 Cliff Keen Invitational in Las Vegas and was named The Outstanding Wrestler of the 2022 tournament after finishing with a 5-0 record. After this performance, he was declared the Big Ten Conference's Wrestler of the Week. Sasso maintained his undefeated record in Big Ten duals, however, his crowning achievement came at the 2023 Big Ten Championships, where he won the title at 149 pounds and received the distinction of being named 2023 All-Big Ten.

At the 2023 NCAA Division I Wrestling Championships, Sasso wrestled through the bracket to the final bout where he faced opponent Yianni Diakomihalis. The first period of the match was marked by several stalemates, with neither wrestler managing to secure a point. Diakomihalis started the second period from the down position and executed a reversal, gaining a 2-0 advantage. Sasso escaped, before a Diakomihalis takedown, narrowing the score to 4-1. However, Diakomihalis secured a takedown, extending his lead to 4-1. Sasso managed to escape once more, bringing the score to 4-2, but his late offensive efforts fell short. Ultimately, Diakomihalis secured a 4-2 win by decision against Sasso.

Sasso finished the season with a record of 29-4, after appearing in his fourth consecutive Big Ten Conference final and second NCAA Division I Wrestling Championships final.

== Coaching ==
After retiring from wrestling in 2025, Sasso joined Lehigh wrestling as an assistant coach.

== Personal life ==
=== 2023 shooting ===
On August 18, 2023, Sasso was shot during a carjacking in an alley near Ohio State University's campus. Two individuals approached Sasso when one pulled out a handgun, demanding his vehicle. That suspect then shot Sasso in the stomach before getting into the driver's seat and driving away with the other suspect. After suffering severe injuries, Sasso was rushed to Ohio State University Wexner Medical Center where he immediately underwent surgery to reconstruct his colon. The next day, August 19, 2023 Sasso underwent another surgery to remove the bullet, which had lodged near his spine causing severe nerve damage. Following the surgeries, Sasso spent three days in the intensive care unit before being transferred to an acute unit for more care. After spending 41 days in the hospital, Sasso was released, immediately returning to visit his Ohio State teammates.

=== 2025 arrest ===
Police arrested Sasso in his hometown, Nazareth, on July 16, 2025, on gun and drug charges after being pulled over for expired vehicle registration.
