= Yianni Diakomihalis =

American wrestler (born 1999)

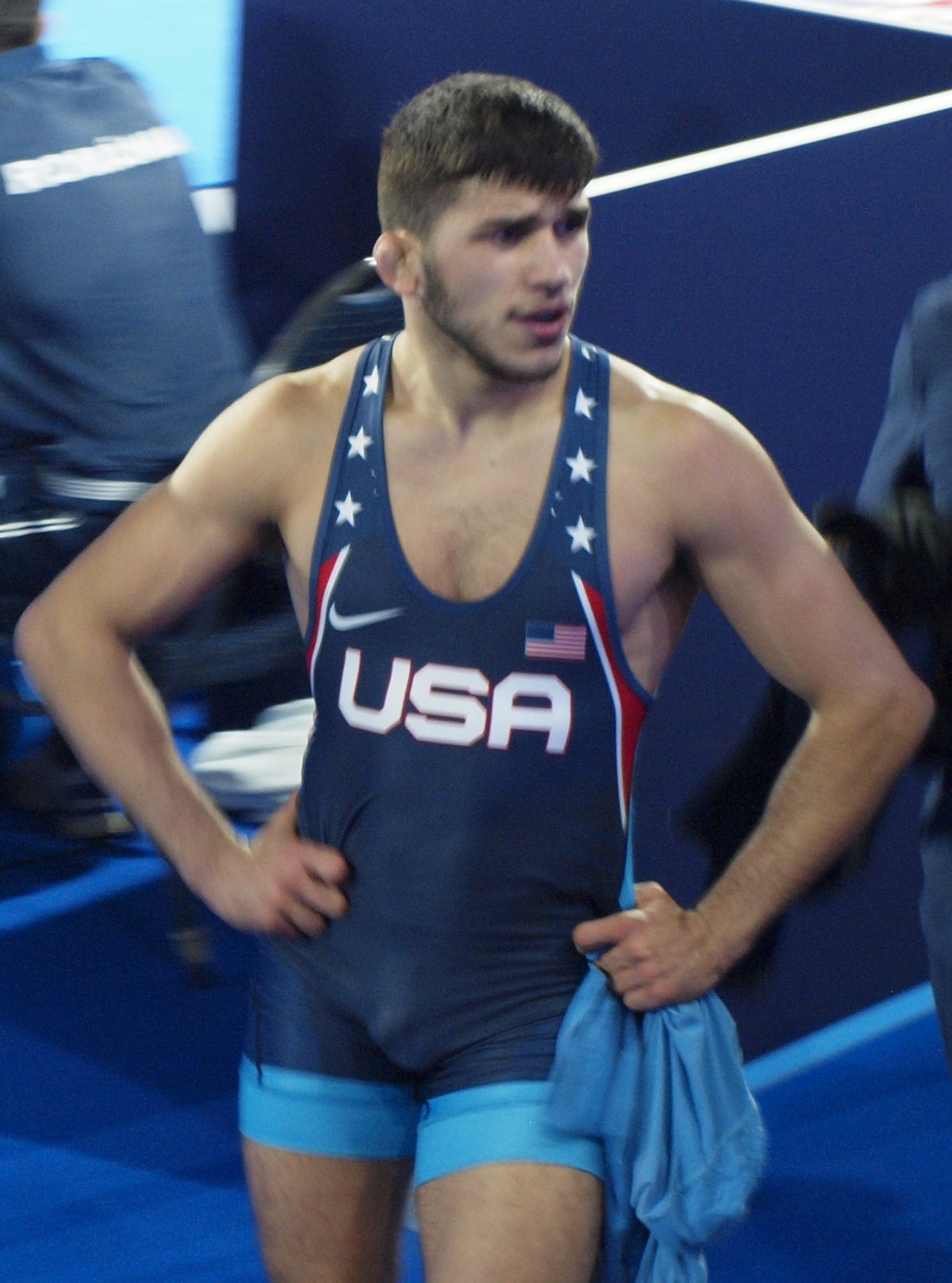
- Diakomihalis at the 2021 World Championships in Oslo, Norway

Personal information
- Born: April 11, 1999 (age 27) Rochester, New York, U.S.
- Height: 1.66 m (5 ft 5 in)
- Website: yiannid.com

Sport
- Country: United States
- Sport: Wrestling
- Weight class: 70 kg (150 lb)
- Events: Freestyle and Folkstyle
- College team: Cornell
- Club: Spartan Combat RTC
- Team: USA
- Coached by: Rob Koll; Mike Grey
- Now coaching: Cornell (assistant)
Medal record
Men's freestyle wrestling
Representing the United States
World Championships
Silver medal – second place	2022 Belgrade	65 kg
World Cup
Gold medal – first place	2022 Coralville	Team
Pan American Championships
Gold medal – first place	2023 Buenos Aires	65 kg
Gold medal – first place	2020 Ottawa	65 kg
Grand Prix
Bronze medal – third place	2023 Taraz	65 kg
Silver medal – second place	2022 Tunisia	65 kg
Gold medal – first place	2021 Warsaw	65 kg
Gold medal – first place	2021 Nice	65 kg
Gold medal – first place	2019 Istanbul	65 kg
Gold medal – first place	2019 Warsaw	65 kg
US National Championships
Gold medal – first place	2025 Las Vegas	70 kg
Gold medal – first place	2019 Las Vegas	65 kg
U17 World Championships
Gold medal – first place	2016 Tbilisi	65 kg
Gold medal – first place	2015 Sarajevo	65 kg
Men's collegiate wrestling
Representing the Cornell Big Red
NCAA Division I Championships
Gold medal – first place	2023 Tulsa	149 lb
Gold medal – first place	2022 Detroit	149 lb
Gold medal – first place	2019 Pittsburgh	141 lb
Gold medal – first place	2018 Cleveland	141 lb
EIWA Championships
Gold medal – first place	2023 Philadelphia	149 lb
Gold medal – first place	2022 Ithaca	149 lb
Gold medal – first place	2019 Vestal	141 lb
Gold medal – first place	2018 Hempstead	141 lb

John Michael "Yianni" Diakomihalis (born April 11, 1999) is an American former freestyle and folkstyle wrestler who competed at 70 kilograms. He currently is assistant coach for the Cornell Big Red.

A two-time U.S. national champion in freestyle, Diakomihalis formerly competed at 65 kilograms, where he was the 2022 World silver medalist, a two-time Pan American champion, and a two-time U17 World champion, among other feats. He also competed in the Lightweight division of Real American Freestyle (RAF), where he was the inaugural RAF Lightweight Champion.

While in college, he became the fifth four-time NCAA Division I champion in history out of Cornell University.

== Wrestling career ==
=== High school ===
Diakomihalis attended Hilton High School in Hilton, New York, along with his brother Greg, who would go on to become a five-time NYSPHSAA Division I champion himself. In eight grade, he won the Division I state championship at 99 pounds, defeating eventual Cornell teammate Vito Arujau in the finals.

Diakomihalis would go on to become a four-time state champion, as he was unable to compete for a fifth one due to an injury. In freestyle, he claimed titles from the U17 World Championships in the 2015 and 2016 editions. He would graduate in 2017 posting a 243–3 record, on a win streak of 210 victories, and would then go on to wrestle at Cornell University as he had committed to do 2014.

=== Cornell University ===
==== 2017–2018 ====
As a freshman, Diakomihalis won the Bearcat Open, New York State Intercollegiate, and the Cliff Keen Invitational and compiled a record of 28–1 during the regular season. He then won the EIWA conference title and would go on to claim his first NCAA championship, joining Kyle Dake as the only Big Reds to do so in their "true freshman" year of competition and earning notable upsets over top-seeded Bryce Meredith (whom he beat in the final), second-seeded Jaydin Eierman, and two-time NCAA champion Dean Heil. Diakomihalis suffered a torn ACL during his quarterfinal matchup against Heil.

==== 2018–2019 ====
As a sophomore, Diakomihalis won the Mat Town Open I and the South Beach Individual and capped a perfect 13–0 record in dual matches, ending the regular season unbeaten. He went on to win his second EIWA conference title and earned the Outstanding Wrestler award in the process.

At the NCAA championships, he defeated the likes of Jaydin Eierman, Joseph McKenna and Dominick Demas his second national title. Diakomihalis was named the EIWA Top Wrestler and was a finalist for the Dan Hodge Trophy.

==== 2019–2020 ====
Diakomihalis did not compete at the NCAA level in 2019–2020, as he took an Olympic redshirt year and focused on freestyle.

==== 2020–2021 ====
Yianni planned to return to college wrestling in 2020–2021; however, the Ivy League announced the cancellation of all winter sports on November 13, 2020, due to the COVID-19 pandemic.

==== 2021–2022 ====
After 975 days, Diakomihalis finally returned to the mat for the Big Red on November 20, 2021, defeating Stanford's Jaden Abas at 149 pounds. He finished 28-0 and won his third NCAA title (his first at 149 pounds).

==== 2022–2023 ====
Diakomihalis finished his college career with his fourth title at the NCAA tournament in Tulsa (his second title at 149 pounds) with a 4-2 victory over Sammy Sasso of Ohio State University. Diakomihalis became the fifth wrestler in NCAA history, and the second from Cornell University, to win four NCAA titles. While at Cornell he was a member of Quill and Dagger.

== Freestyle career ==
=== Age-group level ===
Diakomihalis was an accomplished cadet freestyle wrestler, he was a two-time world champion and two-time UWW National champion. As a junior, he placed third at the 2016 UWW Nationals.

=== Senior level ===
==== 2019 ====
After opting for the Olympic redshirt, Diakomihalis attended his first senior-level tournament at the US Open in April. He went 6–0 (three technical falls) with notable wins over Frank Molinaro, Jordan Oliver, and Zain Retherford in the finals. Not long after, he competed in an exhibition match at the Beat the Streets charity event against multiple World medalist Bajrang Punia. He won the match on points (10–8).

After winning the US Open championship, Diakomihalis sat out of the World Team Trials Challenge, having earned himself an automatic spot at Final X: Rutgers with the US Open victory; US Open finalist Retherford won the World Team Trials Challenge to earn the other spot at Final X in June. In the first match of the best-of three series, Diakomihalis fell 10-4. The second match ended controversially. Retherford was down 4–6 late in the match when he got a takedown for two points, while Diakomihalis was awarded two points for a back exposure to apparently win the match 8-6, as time expired while the wrestlers were still grappling. Retherford's corner challenged the points awarded to Diakomihalis and won the challenge, resulting in a final score of 6–6 with criteria advantage to Retherford, giving him a 2-0 lead in the series and an apparent victory at Final X. However, subsequent to the tournament, Diakomihalis initiated an arbitration challenging the scoring change. Diakomihalis ultimately prevailed in the arbitration with a finding that the scoring review was conducted improperly. The arbitrator awarded Diakomihalis a rematch of the second match in the series.

In July, Diakomihalis competed at the prestigious Yasar Dogu Grand Prix in Istanbul, Turkey. He defeated four opponents such as his Final X opponent Zain Retherford, Ali Rahimzade and Ismail Musukaev to claim the championship.

Two weeks later he went on to compete in the Waclaw Ziolkowski Memorial at Warsaw, Poland. He defeated four opponents (two technical falls) including Ismail Musukaev (by forfeit) to claim the championship.

In September, the rematch between Retherford and Diakomihalis took place in a special event called Final X: Yianni vs. Zain in Wilkes-Barre, Pennsylvania. Diakomihalis lost the bout on points, 2-1, losing his chance to represent the United States at the World Championships.

In December, he competed at the US Nationals. He defeated three opponents before getting upset by Joseph McKenna in the semifinals. He advanced to the finals of the consolation brackets but forfeited his final match.

==== 2020 ====
In his first tournament of the year, Diakomihalis competed at the Pan American Championships. He defeated four opponents including Agustín Destribats and NCAA Division II champion Jose Rodriguez to claim the championship.

Diakomihalis was scheduled to compete at the US Olympic Team Trials on April 4–5 at State College, Pennsylvania. However, the event and the Olympics were postponed due to the COVID-19 pandemic, leaving him and all the qualifiers unable to compete.

After more than half a year without stepping on the mats, Diakomihalis wrestled at the annual Beat The Streets event against the heavily accomplished Vladimer Khinchegashvili on September 17. He lost the competitive and close match by criteria.

Diakomihalis represented the Spartan Combat Wrestling Club at 65 kilograms in the FloWrestling: RTC Cup on December 4–5. He tech'd 2020 Big Ten Championship runner-up Sammy Sasso (Ohio State) in the first round, followed up with two criteria victories over 2017 World Championship runner-up James Green (New Jersey) and got a final TF over 2018 NCAA All-American Tariq Wilson to help the team reach the third-place.

==== 2021 ====
To start off the year, Diakomihalis wrestled two-time and reigning Pan American champion (70 kg) Anthony Ashnault on January 8, at the SCRTC I. After scoring two two-point takedowns and a step-out, he scored a five-point slam, driving Ashnault to a technical fall. Diakomihalis then competed at the Henri Deglane Grand Prix of France on January 16. After advancing to the semifinals with two wins, Diakomihalis faced World and Olympic champion Vladimer Khinchegashvili in a rematch from their BTS match, and was able to avenge his lone 2020 loss when he dominantly tech'd the Georgian, advancing to the finals, where he flawlessly defeated James Green, in a rubber match from their series at the RTC Cup, to claim gold.

Diakomihalis then competed at the America's Cup on February, defeating DI All-Americans Mitch McKee (twice) and Pat Lugo to help the Team Kenny Monday reach sixth place. On March, he defeated Matt Kolodzik in a dual match against the NJRTC.

In April 2–3, he competed at the rescheduled US Olympic Team Trials as the second seed, in an attempt to represent the United States at the 2020 Summer Olympics. After defeating the defending US Olympic Team Member Frank Molinaro, he was upset by third-seeded and 2019 US National champion Jordan Oliver, ending Diakomihalis' win streak. He came back to wrestle for third–place after defeating Mitch McKee, but was once again defeated, now by 2021 NCAA champion Nick Lee, placing fourth.

After his loss at the Olympic Trials, Diakomihalis came back at the prestigious Poland Open, where he was the defending champion, on June 9. In the second round, he was knocked off by Iszmail Muszukajev in a frenetic rematch from their also frenetic match in 2019. Next, he most notably dominated recently crowned Pan American Continental champion Joseph McKenna to a technical fall and defeated the same opponent he defeated in his first match, 2018 University World Champion Eduard Grigorew, winning the championship without getting the rubber match with Musukaev as Musukaev forfeited out of the tournament after their earlier match.

Diakomihalis then competed at the 2021 US World Team Trials from September 11 to 12, intending to represent the country at the World Championships. After dropping All-American Luke Pletcher to make the finale, Diakomihalis faced Joseph McKenna in a best-of-three match. After losing a razor-close first bout, he won the next two, including a dominant technical fall in order to become the 2021 US World Team member.

Diakomihalis represented the United States at the 2021 World Championships on October 3 in Oslo, Norway. After a dominant first round win over Italy, he was eliminated by 2020 Individual World Cup winner Vazgen Tevanyan on points.

==== 2022 ====
In May, at the 2022 World Team Trials Challenge tournament, Diakomihalis defeated Luke Pletcher and Ian Parker, both by 10-0 technical superiority, to advance to Final X against Evan Henderson.

At Final X in June at Madison Square Garden, Diakomihalis defeated Henderson 11-9 and 14-4 to win the best-of-three series and earn his second straight spot on Team USA for the World Championships.

At the 2022 World Championships in Belgrade, Diakomihalis made history as the first 65 kg American wrestler to earn a medal at the World Wrestling Championships since Bill Zadick in 2006. He advanced to the finals with three straight wins. He began with a 4-0 win over Vazgen Tevanyan of Armenia, avenging his loss at the 2021 World Championships. He followed that with a 10-0 win by technical superiority over Vladimir Dubov of Bulgaria. In the semifinals, he defeated Bajrang Punia of India by technical superiority, 10-0 to advance to the finals. His semifinal victory guaranteed him a silver medal and clinched the team title for the United States. In the finals, Diakomihalis was defeated by Rahman Amouzad of Iran by a score of 13-8, thereby claiming the silver medal.

==== 2023 ====
In May 2023, Diakomihalis represented Team USA at the Pan American Championships, going 4-0 and earning the gold medal.

His silver medal at 2022 Worlds entitled Diakomihalis to skip the preliminary qualifying rounds for Team USA and advance directly to Final X. At Final X, he lost consecutive matches to Nick Lee, 7-6 and 8-8 (criteria).

==== 2025 ====
Diakomihalis moved up to 70 kg for the 2025 US Open. With an 8-2 win over James Green in the final, Diakomihalis won his first US Open title since 2019. With the win, he advances to Final X on June 14, 2025 at the Prudential Center in Newark. At Final X, Diakomihalis faced PJ Duke, the winner of the U.S. World Team Trials in Louisville on May 16–17, 2025 for the right to represent Team USA at the World Championships in Zagreb on September 13–21, 2025. Diakomihalis won the first match by 10-0 TF, but Duke won the next two, 17-10 and then by fall.

At RAF 01 on August 30, 2025, Diakomihalis defeated Bajrang Punia by a score of 5-1 to become the inaugural RAF Lightweight Champion.

== Freestyle record ==
Senior Freestyle Matches
Res.	Record	Opponent	Score	Date	Event	Location
RAF 01 155 lb (Won Inaugural RAF Lightweight Championship)
Win	70-18	(India) Bajrang Punia	5-1	August 30, 2025	RAF 01	(United States) Cleveland, Ohio
2025 US World Team Trials (silver) at 70 kg
Loss	69–18	(United States) PJ Duke	Fall	June 14, 2025	2025 Final X	(United States) Newark, New Jersey
Loss	69–17	(United States) PJ Duke	10–17	June 14, 2025	2025 Final X	(United States) Newark, New Jersey
Win	69–16	(United States) PJ Duke	TF 10–0	June 14, 2025	2025 Final X	(United States) Newark, New Jersey
2025 US Open (gold) at 70 kg
Win	68–16	(United States) James Green	8–2	April 25–26, 2025	2025 US Open National Championships	(United States) Las Vegas, Nevada
Win	67–16	(United States) Bryce Andonian	Fall	April 25–26, 2025	2025 US Open National Championships	(United States) Las Vegas, Nevada
Win	66–16	(United States) Daniel Cardenas	TF 18–7	April 25–26, 2025	2025 US Open National Championships	(United States) Las Vegas, Nevada
Win	65–16	(United States) Drew Roberts	TF 10–0	April 25–26, 2025	2025 US Open National Championships	(United States) Las Vegas, Nevada
Win	64–16	(United States) Gabriel Onorato	TF 11–0	April 25–26, 2025	2025 US Open National Championships	(United States) Las Vegas, Nevada
2024 US Olympic Team Trials DNP at 65 kg
Loss	63–16	(United States) Jesse Mendez	7–12	April 19, 2024	2024 Olympic Team Trials	(United States) State College, Pennsylvania
Win	64–15	(United States) Kaleb Larkin	13–9	April 19, 2024	2024 Olympic Team Trials	(United States) State College, Pennsylvania
2024 US Pan American Team Trials (silver) at 65 kg
NC	—N/a	(United States) Nick Lee	FF	February 3, 2024	2024 US Pan American Team Trials	(United States) Denver, Colorado
Loss	63–15	(United States) Nick Lee	3–12	February 3, 2024	2024 US Pan American Team Trials	(United States) Denver, Colorado
2023 D.A. Kunaev International (bronze) at 65 kg
Win	63–14	(Kazakhstan) Shattyk Alaidar	TF 10–0	November 3–4, 2023	2023 D.A. Kunaev International	Taraz Kazakhstan
Loss	62–14	(United States) Joseph McKenna	3–4	November 3–4, 2023	2023 D.A. Kunaev International	Taraz Kazakhstan
Win	62–13	(Kazakhstan) Didar Nuakhmet	TF 11–0	November 3–4, 2023	2023 D.A. Kunaev International	Taraz Kazakhstan
Win	61–13	(Kazakhstan) Sanzhar Mukhtar	TF 12–0	November 3–4, 2023	2023 D.A. Kunaev International	Taraz Kazakhstan
Win	60–13	(Kazakhstan) Nursultan Sadyk	TF 10–0	November 3–4, 2023	2023 D.A. Kunaev International	Taraz Kazakhstan
2023 US World Team Trials (silver) at 65 kg
Loss	59–13	(United States) Nick Lee	8–8	June 11, 2023	2023 Final X	(United States) Newark, New Jersey
Loss	59–12	(United States) Nick Lee	6–7	June 11, 2023	2023 Final X	(United States) Newark, New Jersey
2023 Pan American Championships (gold) at 65 kg
Win	59–11	(Cuba) Alejandro Valdes	4–1	May 6, 2023	2023 Pan American Championships	Buenos Aires, Argentina
Win	58–11	(Argentina) Agustin Destribats	9–8	May 6, 2023	2023 Pan American Championships	Buenos Aires, Argentina
Win	57–11	(Panama) Wilfredo Lopez	TF 11–0	May 6, 2023	2023 Pan American Championships	Buenos Aires, Argentina
Win	56–11	(Peru) Sixto Auccapina	TF 10–0	May 6, 2023	2023 Pan American Championships	Buenos Aires, Argentina
2022 World Championships (silver) at 65 kg
Loss	55–11	(Iran) Rahman Amouzad	8–13	September 18, 2022	2022 World Championships	Belgrade, Serbia
Win	55–10	(Puerto Rico) Sebastian Rivera	TF 10–0	September 17, 2022	2022 World Championships	Belgrade, Serbia
Win	54–10	(India) Bajrang Punia	TF 10–0	September 17, 2022	2022 World Championships	Belgrade, Serbia
Win	53–10	(Bulgaria) Vladimir Dubov	TF 10–0	September 17, 2022	2022 World Championships	Belgrade, Serbia
Win	52–10	(Armenia) Vazgen Tevanyan	4–0	September 17, 2022	2022 World Championships	Belgrade, Serbia
2022 Tunis Ranking Series (silver) at 65 kg
Win	51–10	(Kazakhstan) Adlan Askarov	TF 15–5	July 18, 2022	2022 Tunis Ranking Series	Tunis, Tunisia
Loss	50–10	(India) Sujeet Sujeet	2–8	July 18, 2022	2022 Tunis Ranking Series	Tunis, Tunisia
Win	50–9	(Argentina) Agustin Destribats	9–2	July 18, 2022	2022 Tunis Ranking Series	Tunis, Tunisia
2022 US World Team Trials (gold) at 65 kg
Win	49–9	(United States) Evan Henderson	TF 14–4	June 8, 2022	2022 Final X: New York	(United States) New York, New York
Win	48–9	(United States) Evan Henderson	11–9	June 8, 2022	2022 Final X: New York	(United States) New York, New York
Win	47–9	(United States) Ian Parker	TF 10–0	May 21–23, 2022	2022 US World Team Trials Challenge	(United States) Coralville, Iowa
Win	46–9	(United States) Luke Pletcher	TF 10–0	May 21–23, 2022	2022 US World Team Trials Challenge	(United States) Coralville, Iowa
2021 World Championships 12th at 65 kg
Loss	45–9	(Armenia) Vazgen Tevanyan	1–5	October 3, 2021	2021 World Championships	Oslo, Norway
Win	45–8	(Italy) Colin Realbuto	TF 10–0	October 3, 2021	2021 World Championships	Oslo, Norway
2021 US World Team Trials (gold) at 65 kg
Win	44–8	(United States) Joseph McKenna	TF 12–2	September 12, 2021	2021 US World Team Trials	(United States) Lincoln, Nebraska
Win	43–8	(United States) Joseph McKenna	5–2	September 12, 2021	2021 US World Team Trials	(United States) Lincoln, Nebraska
Loss	42–8	(United States) Joseph McKenna	7–8	September 12, 2021	2021 US World Team Trials	(United States) Lincoln, Nebraska
Win	42–7	(United States) Luke Pletcher	TF 10–0	September 11, 2021	2021 US World Team Trials	(United States) Lincoln, Nebraska
2021 Poland Open (gold) at 65 kg
Win	41–7	(Hungary) Ismail Musukaev	FF	June 9, 2021	2021 Poland Open	Warsaw, Poland
Win	40–7	(Poland) Eduard Grigorew	7–4	June 9, 2021	2021 Poland Open	Warsaw, Poland
Win	39–7	(United States) Joseph McKenna	TF 15–4	June 9, 2021	2021 Poland Open	Warsaw, Poland
Win	38–7	(Poland) Krzysztof Bieńkowski	INJ	June 9, 2021	2021 Poland Open	Warsaw, Poland
Loss	37–7	(Hungary) Ismail Musukaev	6–7	June 9, 2021	2021 Poland Open	Warsaw, Poland
Win	37–6	(Poland) Eduard Grigorew	9–3	June 9, 2021	2021 Poland Open	Warsaw, Poland
2020 US Olympic Team Trials 4th at 65 kg
Loss	36–6	(United States) Nick Lee	8–16	April 2–3, 2021	2020 US Olympic Team Trials	(United States) Fort Worth, Texas
Win	36–5	(United States) Mitch McKee	TF 14–4	April 2–3, 2021	2020 US Olympic Team Trials	(United States) Fort Worth, Texas
Loss	35–5	(United States) Jordan Oliver	4–4	April 2–3, 2021	2020 US Olympic Team Trials	(United States) Fort Worth, Texas
Win	35–4	(United States) Frank Molinaro	TF 10–0	April 2–3, 2021	2020 US Olympic Team Trials	(United States) Fort Worth, Texas
Win	34–4	(United States) Matt Kolodzik	9–6	March 5, 2021	The East Coast Clash: NJRTC vs. Spartan Combat RTC	(United States) Allentown, Pennsylvania
2021 America's Cup at 65 kg – 6th for TKM
Win	33–4	(United States) Pat Lugo	7–2	February 10–11, 2021	2021 America's Cup	(United States) Concord, North Carolina
Win	32–4	(United States) Mitch McKee	14–10	February 10–11, 2021	2021 America's Cup	(United States) Concord, North Carolina
Win	31–4	(United States) Mitch McKee	TF 11–0	February 10–11, 2021	2021 America's Cup	(United States) Concord, North Carolina
2021 Henri Deglane Grand Prix (gold) at 65 kg
Win	30–4	(United States) James Green	5–0	January 16, 2021	Grand Prix de France Henri Deglane 2021	Nice, France
Win	29–4	(Georgia (country)) Vladimer Khinchegashvili	TF 13–2	January 16, 2021	Grand Prix de France Henri Deglane 2021	Nice, France
Win	28–4	(Poland) Krzysztof Bieńkowski	TF 10–0	January 16, 2021	Grand Prix de France Henri Deglane 2021	Nice, France
Win	27–4	(France) Quentin Sticker	TF 13–2	January 16, 2021	Grand Prix de France Henri Deglane 2021	Nice, France
Win	26–4	(United States) Anthony Ashnault	TF 10–0	January 8, 2021	SCRTC I	(United States) Austin, Texas
FloWrestling RTC Cup at 65 kg – (bronze) for SCWC
Win	25–4	(United States) Tariq Wilson	TF 11–0	December 4–5, 2020	FloWrestling RTC Cup	(United States) Austin, Texas
Win	24–4	(United States) James Green	4–4	December 4–5, 2020	FloWrestling RTC Cup	(United States) Austin, Texas
Win	23–4	(United States) James Green	3–3	December 4–5, 2020	FloWrestling RTC Cup	(United States) Austin, Texas
Win	22–4	(United States) Sammy Sasso	TF 12–2	December 4–5, 2020	FloWrestling RTC Cup	(United States) Austin, Texas
Loss	21–4	(Georgia (country)) Vladimer Khinchegashvili	4–4	September 17, 2020	2020 Beat The Streets	(United States) New York City
2020 Pan American ChampionshipS (gold) at 65 kg
Win	21–3	(Ecuador) Mauricio Sanchez	4–0	March 6–9, 2020	2020 Pan American Championships	Ottawa, Canada
Win	20–3	(Argentina) Agustin Destribats	7–4	March 6–9, 2020	2020 Pan American Championships	Ottawa, Canada
Win	19–3	(Puerto Rico) Jose Rodriguez	9–2	March 6–9, 2020	2020 Pan American Championships	Ottawa, Canada
Win	—N/a	(Cuba) Luis Orta	FF	March 6–9, 2020	2020 Pan American Championships	Ottawa, Canada
2019 US Nationals 4th at 65 kg
Win	18–3	(United States) Bryce Meredith	TF 10–0	December 20–22, 2019	2019 US National Championships	(United States) Las Vegas, Nevada
Loss	17–3	(United States) Joseph McKenna	5–5	December 20–22, 2019	2019 US National Championships	(United States) Las Vegas, Nevada
Win	17–2	(United States) Ben Whitford	11–3	December 20–22, 2019	2019 US National Championships	(United States) Las Vegas, Nevada
Win	16–2	(United States) Nick Dardanes	TF 10–0	December 20–22, 2019	2019 US National Championships	(United States) Las Vegas, Nevada
Win	15–2	(United States) Mario Mason	TF 10–0	December 20–22, 2019	2019 US National Championships	(United States) Las Vegas, Nevada
2019 US World Team Trials (silver) at 65 kg
Loss	14–2	(United States) Zain Retherford	1–2	September 2, 2019	2019 Final X: Yianni vs Zain	(United States) Wilkes-Barre, Pennsylvania
2019 Poland Open (gold) at 65 kg
Win	14–1	(Ukraine) Gor Ogannesyan	9–8	August 2–4, 2019	2019 Poland Open	Warsaw, Poland
Win	13–1	(Kazakhstan) Sayatbek Okassov	TF 11–0	August 2–4, 2019	2019 Poland Open	Warsaw, Poland
Win	12–1	(China) Shaohua Yuan	TF 10–0	August 2–4, 2019	2019 Poland Open	Warsaw, Poland
2019 Grand Prix Yaşar Doğu (gold) at 65 kg
Win	11–1	(Bahrain) Haji Mohamad Ali	Fall	July 11–14, 2019	2019 Grand Prix Yaşar Doğu	Istanbul, Turkey
Win	10–1	(Hungary) Ismail Musukaev	TF 19-9	July 11–14, 2019	2019 Grand Prix Yaşar Doğu	Istanbul, Turkey
Win	9–1	(Azerbaijan) Ali Rahimzade	TF 13–2	July 11–14, 2019	2019 Grand Prix Yaşar Doğu	Istanbul, Turkey
Win	8–1	(United States) Zain Retherford	9–5	July 11–14, 2019	2019 Grand Prix Yaşar Doğu	Istanbul, Turkey
NC	—N/a	(United States) Zain Retherford	6–6 (overturned)	June 7–8, 2019	2019 Final X: Rutgers	(United States) New Brunswick, New Jersey
Loss	7–1	(United States) Zain Retherford	4–10	June 7–8, 2019	2019 Final X: Rutgers	(United States) New Brunswick, New Jersey
Win	7–0	(India) Bajrang Punia	10–8	May 6, 2019	2019 Beat The Streets Grapple at the Garden	(United States) New York City, New York
2019 US Open (gold) at 65 kg
Win	6–0	(United States) Zain Retherford	6–4	April 24–27, 2019	2019 US Open National Championships	(United States) Las Vegas, Nevada
Win	5–0	(United States) Jordan Oliver	TF 16–5	April 24–27, 2019	2019 US Open National Championships	(United States) Las Vegas, Nevada
Win	4–0	(United States) Frank Molinaro	10–3	April 24–27, 2019	2019 US Open National Championships	(United States) Las Vegas, Nevada
Win	3–0	(United States) Nick Dardanes	TF 10–0	April 24–27, 2019	2019 US Open National Championships	(United States) Las Vegas, Nevada
Win	2–0	(United States) Chase Farr	TF 14–4	April 24–27, 2019	2019 US Open National Championships	(United States) Las Vegas, Nevada
Win	1–0	(United States) Corey Shie	7–4	April 24–27, 2019	2019 US Open National Championships	(United States) Las Vegas, Nevada

== NCAA record ==
NCAA Championships Matches
Res.	Record	Opponent	Score	Date	Event
Start of 2021–2022 Season (junior year)
End of 2018–2019 Season (sophomore year)
2019 NCAA Championships (gold) at 141 lbs
Win	66–1	Joseph McKenna	SV-1 6–4	March 21–23, 2019	2019 NCAA Division I Wrestling Championships
Win	65–1	Jaydin Eierman	6–5	March 21–23, 2019	2019 NCAA Division I Wrestling Championships
Win	64–1	Dom Demas	5–1	March 21–23, 2019	2019 NCAA Division I Wrestling Championships
Win	63–1	Chad Red	7–3	March 21–23, 2019	2019 NCAA Division I Wrestling Championships
Win	62–1	Pete Lipari	10–5	March 21–23, 2019	2019 NCAA Division I Wrestling Championships
2019 EIWA Championships (gold) at 141 lbs
Win	61–1	Nick Gil	8–2	March 8–9, 2019	2019 EIWA Conference Championships
Win	60–1	Anthony Sparacio	MD 14–2	March 8–9, 2019	2019 EIWA Conference Championships
Win	59–1	Wil Gil	TF 18–3	March 8–9, 2019	2019 EIWA Conference Championships
Win	58–1	Ryan Friedman	Fall	March 8–9, 2019	2019 EIWA Conference Championships
Win	57–1	Joseph McKenna	7–5	February 22, 2019	Ohio State – Cornell Dual
Win	56–1	AC Headlee	9–2	February 16, 2019	Cornell – North Carolina Dual
Win	55–1	Mitch Moore	6–1	February 15, 2019	Cornell – Virginia Tech Dual
Win	54–1	Marshall Keller	MD 14–6	February 9, 2019	Princeton – Cornell Dual
Win	53–1	AJ Vindici	TF 16–1	February 8, 2019	Pennsylvania – Cornell Dual
Win	52–1	Kyle Shoop	Fall	February 2, 2019	Lock Haven – Cornell Dual
Win	51–1	Ryan Friedman	Fall	January 26, 2019	Cornell – Harvard Dual
Win	50–1	Colin Realbuto	TF 22–4	January 26, 2019	Cornell – Brown Dual
Win	49–1	Ryan Pomrinca	13–7	January 12, 2019	Cornell – Lehigh Dual
Win	48–1	Jaydin Eierman	3–1	December 30, 2018	Cornell – Missouri Dual
Win	47–1	Cole Weaver	TF 23–4	December 30, 2018	Cor–nell – Indiana Dual
2018 South Beach Individual (gold) at 141 lbs
Win	46–1	Kyle Luigs	Fall	December 29, 2018	2018 South Beach Individual
Win	45–1	Jaime Hernandez	MD 18–4	December 29, 2018	2018 South Beach Individual
Win	44–1	Alex Hrisopoulos	Fall	December 29, 2018	2018 South Beach Individual
Win	43–1	Sam Turner	MD 14–6	December 29, 2018	Cornell – Wyoming Dual
Win	42–1	Josh Alber	MD 12–2	December 16, 2018	Cornell – Northern Iowa Dual
2018 Mat Town Open I (gold) at 141 lbs
Win	41–1	Ryan Moore	FF	November 25, 2018	2018 Mat Town Open I
Win	40-1	Mason Lindenmuth	TF 17-1	November 25, 2018	2018 Mat Town Open I
Win	39-1	CJ Manley	Fall	November 25, 2018	2018 Mat Town Open I
Win	38-1	Marlon Argneta	Fall	November 25, 2018	2018 Mat Town Open I
Start of 2018–2019 Season (sophomore year)
End of 2017–2018 Season (freshman year)
2018 NCAA Championships (gold) at 141 lbs
Win	37–1	Bryce Meredith	7–4	March 15–17, 2018	2018 NCAA Division I Wrestling Championships
Win	36–1	Jaydin Eierman	SV-1 6–4	March 15–17, 2018	2018 NCAA Division I Wrestling Championships
Win	35–1	Dean Heil	6–5	March 15–17, 2018	2018 NCAA Division I Wrestling Championships
Win	34–1	Nick Gil	MD 13–4	March 15–17, 2018	2018 NCAA Division I Wrestling Championships
Win	33–1	Nick Zanetta	MD 10–1	March 15–17, 2018	2018 NCAA Division I Wrestling Championships
2018 EIWA Championships (gold) at 141 lbs
Win	32–1	Tyler Smith	MD 17–9	March 3–4, 2018	2018 EIWA Conference Championships
Win	31–1	Nick Gil	9–4	March 3–4, 2018	2018 EIWA Conference Championships
Win	30–1	Pat D'Arcy	TF 18–3	March 3–4, 2018	2018 EIWA Conference Championships
Win	29–1	Zeke Salvo	Fall	March 3–4, 2018	2018 EIWA Conference Championships
Win	28–1	AC Headlee	7–6	February 16, 2018	North Carolina – Cornell Dual
Win	27–1	Jordan Reich	Fall	February 10, 2018	Cornell – Princeton Dual
Win	26–1	FF	FF	February 10, 2018	Cornell – Pennsylvania Dual
Win	25–1	Julian Flores	Fall	February 9, 2018	Cornell – Drexel Dual
Win	24–1	Kyle Shoop	TF 19–3	February 4, 2018	Cornell – Lock Haven Dual
Win	23–1	Valentine Miele	Fall	February 3, 2018	Columbia – Cornell Dual
Win	22–1	Trevor Tarsi	TF 24–8	January 27, 2018	Harvard – Cornell Dual
Win	21–1	Ezekiel Salvo	Fall	January 27, 2018	Brown – Cornell Dual
Win	20–1	Luke Karam	MD 8–0	January 19, 2018	Lehigh – Cornell Dual
Loss	19–1	Jaydin Eierman	6–9	December 30, 2017	Missouri – Cornell Dual
Win	19–0	Blake Rettell	Fall	December 30, 2017	Cornell – Kent State Dual
Win	18–0	Thomas Thorn	Fall	December 29, 2017	Cornell – Minnesota Dual
Win	17–0	Sam Hampton	Fall	December 29, 2017	Cornell – North Dakota State Dual
Win	16–0	Blake Rettell	Fall	December 18, 2017	Cornell – Buffalo Dual
2017 Cliff Keen Las Vegas Invitational (gold) at 141 lbs
Win	15–0	Josh Alber	8–2	December 1–2, 2017	2017 Cliff Keen Las Vegas Invitational
Win	14–0	Bryce Meredith	4–2	December 1–2, 2017	2017 Cliff Keen Las Vegas Invitational
Win	13–0	Nick Zanetta	MD 9–1	December 1–2, 2017	2017 Cliff Keen Las Vegas Invitational
Win	12–0	Sal Profaci	10–4	December 1–2, 2017	2017 Cliff Keen Las Vegas Invitational
Win	11–0	Sa'Derian Perry	MD 11–2	December 1–2, 2017	2017 Cliff Keen Las Vegas Invitational
2017 NYS Intercollegiate Championships (gold) at 141 lbs
Win	10–0	Corey Shie	TF 19–4	November 19, 2017	2017 NYS Intercollegiate Championships
Win	9–0	Michael Venosa	MD 16–3	November 19, 2017	2017 NYS Intercollegiate Championships
Win	8–0	Christian Briody	Fall	November 19, 2017	2017 NYS Intercollegiate Championships
Win	7–0	Paul Brohan	TF 24–5	November 19, 2017	2017 NYS Intercollegiate Championships
Win	6–0	Josh Alber	5–2	November 17, 2017	Northern Iowa – Cornell Dual
2017 Jonathan Kaloust Bearcat Open (gold) at 141 lbs
Win	5–0	AJ Jaffe	MD 13–4	November 12, 2017	2017 Jonathan Kaloust Bearcat Open
Win	4–0	Nick Lee	MD 14-6	November 12, 2017	2017 Jonathan Kaloust Bearcat Open
Win	3–0	Jacob Lizak	Fall	November 12, 2017	2017 Jonathan Kaloust Bearcat Open
Win	2–0	Matt Swanson	TF 20–5	November 12, 2017	2017 Jonathan Kaloust Bearcat Open
Win	1–0	Jimmy Pawelski	TF 24–9	November 12, 2017	2017 Jonathan Kaloust Bearcat Open
Start of 2017–2018 Season (freshman year)

=== Stats ===
Season	Year	School	Rank	Weight Class	Record	Win	Bonus
2023	Senior	Cornell University	#1 (1st)	149	22-1	95.65%	63.63
2022	Junior	Cornell University	#1 (1st)	149	28-0	100.00%	64.28%
2019	Sophomore	Cornell University	#1 (1st)	141	29–0	100.00%	58.62%
2018	Freshman	Cornell University	#1 (1st)	141	37–1	97.37%	68.42%
Career					115-2	98.3%	65%

== Coaching career ==
Diakomihalis was hired as assistant coach for the Cornell Big Red on April 20, 2026.
