= Schalles Award =

Established in 1999, both Schalles awards, one (the Schalles Award) for the best collegiate pinner in America and the other, (the Junior Schalles Award) for the best scholastic pinner, are annually presented by WIN Magazine, Cliff Keen Athletics and the NWCA. The award is named after Wade Schalles, one of American wrestling's most storied pinners and a Distinguished Member of the National Wrestling Hall of Fame. During his collegiate career (1970-1974) Schalles set the NCAA record at 109 pins.

== Schalles Award winners ==
- 2024 Scott Joll, UNC Pembroke
- 2023 Wyatt Hendrickson, Air Force
- 2022 Wyatt Hendrickson, Air Force
- 2021 Jaydin Eierman, Iowa
- 2020 Ben Darmstadt, Cornell
- 2019 Bo Nickal, Penn State
- 2018 Bo Nickal, Penn State
- 2017 Zain Retherford, Penn State
- 2016 Zain Retherford, Penn State
- 2015 Taylor Walsh, Indiana
- 2014 Taylor Walsh, Indiana
- 2013 Kyle Dake, Cornell
- 2012 Jordan Oliver, Oklahoma State
- 2011 Andrew Alton, Penn State
- 2010 Jayson Ness, Minnesota
- 2009 Josh Patterson, Binghamton
- 2008 Darrion Caldwell, North Carolina State
- 2007 Ben Askren, Missouri
- 2006 Ben Askren, Missouri
- 2005 Marcus LeVesseur, Augsburg College
- 2004 Scott Moore, Virginia
- 2003 Scott Moore, Penn State
- 2002 Cael Sanderson, Iowa State
- 2001 Matt Petsinger, Mankato State & Jared Frayer, Oklahoma
- 2000 Keith Blaske, Ft. Hays State
- 1999 Stephen Neal, Cal-State Bakersfield

== Junior Schalles Award winners ==
- 2023 Ryder Rogotzke, Stillwater (Minn.)
- 2022 Ryder Rogotzke, Stillwater (Minn.)
- 2021 Alex Facundo, Davison (Mich.)
- 2020 Nash Hutmacher, Chamberlain (S.D.)
- 2019 Greg Kerkvliet, Simly (Minnesota)
- 2018 Mason Parris, Lawrenceburg (Indiana)
- 2017 Gable Steveson, Apple Valley (Minnesota)
- 2016 Luke Weber, Forsyth (Montana)
- 2015 Max Thomsen, Laporte City-Union (Iowa)
- 2014 Brandon Womack, Scottsboro (Alabama)
- 2013 Adam Coon, Fowlerville (Michigan)
- 2012 Jordan Rogers, Mead (Spokane, Washington)
- 2011 Nick Gwiazdowski, Duanesburg (New York)
- 2010 Kyven Gadson, Waterloo East (Iowa)
- 2009 Eloheim Palma, Cary (North Carolina)
- 2008 Kyle and Chase Cuthbertson, Scottsboro (Alabama)
- 2007 Hunter Meys, Shenendehowa (New York)
- 2006 Jon Reader, Davison (Michigan)
- 2005 Jake Varner, Bakersfield (California)
- 2004 Coleman Scott, Waynesburg Central (Pennsylvania)
- 2003 Roger Kish, Lapeer West (Michigan)
- 2002 Chase Metcalf, Davison (Michigan)
- 2001 Rusty Blackmon, Bradley Central (Cleveland, Tenn.)
- 2000 Chris Pendleton, Lemoore (California)
- 1999 Nick Simmons, Williamston (Michigan)

== See also ==
- Collegiate wrestling
- Scholastic wrestling
