= 2023 Big Ten Wrestling Championships – 149 lbs =

149 pounds at the 2023 Big Ten Wrestling Championships
- Site: Crisler Center; Ann Arbor, Michigan
- Competitors: 14

Medalists
- 1st place, gold medalist(s): Sammy Sasso (Ohio State)
- 2nd place, silver medalist(s): Michael Blockhus (Minnesota)
- 3rd place, bronze medalist(s): Max Murin (Iowa)

The 149-pound competition at the 2023 Big Ten Wrestling Championships in Ann Arbor, Michigan, took place from March 4–5, 2023 at the Crisler Center.

The competition consisted of a triple-elimination tournament to determine the top ten wrestlers of the Big Ten's 149-pound weight class. The top nine wrestlers would qualify for the 2023 NCAA Division I Wrestling Championships.

== Preliminary seeds ==
The Big Ten announced the preliminary seeds on February 27, 2023.

Seed	Wrestler
1	Sammy Sasso (Ohio State)
2	Austin Gomez (Wisconsin)
3	Yahya Thomas (Northwestern)
4	Max Murin (Iowa)
5	Shayne Van Ness (Penn State)
6	Michael Blockhus (Minnesota)
7	Graham Rooks (Indiana)
8	Ethen Miller (Maryland)
9	Chance Lamer (Michigan)
10	Tony White (Rutgers)
11	Dayne Morton (Nebraska)
12	Jake Harrier (Illinois)
13	Peyton Omania (Michigan State)
14	Jaden Reynolds (Purdue)

== Results ==
Legend

- F — Won by fall
- MF — Won by medical forfeit

=== Championship bracket ===
First Round
1	Sammy Sasso (OSU)
BYE
9	Chance Lamer (MICH)	5
8	Ethen Miller (MD)	3
5	Shayne Van Ness (PSU)	16
12	Jake Harrier (ILL)	4
13	Peyton Omania (MSU)
4	Max Murin (IOWA)	MF
3	Yahya Thomas (NU)	8
14	Jaden Reynolds (PUR)	2
11	Dayne Morton (NEB)	0
6	Michael Blockhus (MINN)	7^{F}
7	Graham Rooks (IND)	4
10	Tony White (RUT)	1
BYE
2	Austin Gomez (WIS)

Quarterfinals
1	Sammy Sasso (OSU)	12
9	Chance Lamer (MICH)	4
5	Shayne Van Ness (PSU)	2
4	Max Murin (IOWA)	4
3	Yahya Thomas (NU)	4
6	Michael Blockhus (MINN)	6
7	Graham Rooks (IND)	6
2	Austin Gomez (WIS)	5

Semifinals
1	Sammy Sasso (OSU)	8
4	Max Murin (IOWA)	2
6	Michael Blockhus (MINN)	6
7	Graham Rooks (IND)	2

1st-Place Match
1	Sammy Sasso (OSU)	7
6	Michael Blockhus (MINN)	5

=== Consolation bracket ===
Consolation Round 1
BYE
BYE

Consolation Round 2

Consolation Quarterfinals
7th-Place Match

Consolation Semifinals
5th-Place Match

3rd-Place Match

== Final standings ==
Note: Top-9 wrestlers qualify for the 2023 NCAA Division I Wrestling Championships.

Rank	Wrestler
1st place, gold medalist(s)	Sammy Sasso (Ohio State)
2nd place, silver medalist(s)	Michael Blockhus (Minnesota)
3rd place, bronze medalist(s)	Max Murin (Iowa)
4	Shayne Van Ness (Penn State)
5	Graham Rooks (Indiana)
6	Yahya Thomas (Northwestern)
7	Chance Lamer (Michigan)
8	Ethen Miller (Maryland)
9	Tony White (Rutgers)
10	Jake Harrier (Illinois)
