= 2016 United States Olympic trials (wrestling) =

2016 US Olympic Wrestling Team Trials
- Host city: Iowa City, Iowa, United States
- Dates: April 8–10, 2016
- Stadium: Carver-Hawkeye Arena

The 2016 United States Olympic Team Trials for wrestling were held at the Carver-Hawkeye Arena of Iowa City, Iowa, on April 8–10, 2016. This event determined the representative of the United States of America for the 2016 Summer Olympics at each Olympic weight class.

== Tournament format ==
1. Challenge tournament (single elimination) – The first part of the trials determined who advanced over to the best–of–three finale and it took place in the first day of competition.
2. Championship series (best-of-3 match final wrestle-off) – In the second part of the trials, the finals which determined the ultimate winner took place, in the second day of competition.

== Medal summary ==
=== Men's freestyle ===
Event	Gold	Silver	Bronze
57 kg	(United States) Daniel Dennis	(United States) Tony Ramos	(United States) Tyler Graff
65 kg	(United States) Frank Molinaro	(United States) Aaron Pico	(United States) Zain Retherford
74 kg	(United States) Jordan Burroughs	(United States) Andrew Howe	(United States) Alex Dieringer
86 kg	(United States) J'den Cox	(United States) Kyle Dake	(United States) David Taylor
97 kg	(United States) Kyle Snyder	(United States) Jake Varner	(United States) Dustin Kilgore
125 kg	(United States) Tervel Dlagnev	(United States) Zach Rey	(United States) Dom Bradley

=== Women's freestyle ===
Event	Gold	Silver	Bronze
48 kg	(United States) Haley Augello	(United States) Victoria Anthony	(United States) Clarissa Chun
53 kg	(United States) Helen Maroulis	(United States) Whitney Conder	(United States) Katherine Fulp-Allen
58 kg	(United States) Kelsey Campbell	(United States) Alli Ragan	(United States) Randyll Beltz
63 kg	(United States) Elena Pirozhkova	(United States) Erin Clodgo	(United States) Mallory Velte
69 kg	(United States) Tamyra Mensah-Stock	(United States) Brittney Roberts	(United States) Randi Miller
76 kg	(United States) Adeline Gray	(United States) Victoria Francis	(United States) Forrest Molinari

=== Men's Greco–Roman ===
Event	Gold	Silver	Bronze
59 kg	(United States) Ildar Hafizov	(United States) Jesse Thielke	(United States) Ryan Mango
66 kg	(United States) RaVaughn Perkins	(United States) Pat Smith	(United States) Alejandro Sancho
75 kg	(United States) Geordan Speiller	(United States) Cheney Haight	(United States) Corey Hope
85 kg	(United States) Ben Provisor	(United States) Jake Clark	(United States) Hayden Zillmer
98 kg	(United States) Joe Rau	(United States) Caylor Williams	(United States) G'Angelo Hancock
130 kg	(United States) Robby Smith	(United States) Adam Coon	(United States) Toby Erickson
