= Dean Heil =

American wrestler (born 1995)

Personal information
- Born: February 9, 1995 (age 31) Griffin, Georgia, U.S.
- Home town: Brunswick, Ohio, U.S.

Sport
- Sport: Wrestling
- Event: Folkstyle
- College team: Oklahoma State
- Coached by: John Smith
Medal record
Men's collegiate wrestling
Representing the Oklahoma State Cowboys
NCAA Division I Championships
Gold medal – first place	2016 New York	141 lb
Gold medal – first place	2017 St. Louis	141 lb
Big 12 Championships
Gold medal – first place	2015 Ames	141 lb
Gold medal – first place	2016 Kansas City	141 lb
Gold medal – first place	2017 Tulsa	141 lb
Silver medal – second place	2018 Tulsa	141 lb

Dean Heil is a former folkstyle wrestler from Brunswick, Ohio. Heil wrestled collegiately at Oklahoma State, where he was a three-time All-American and two-time NCAA champion.

== High school career ==
At St. Edward High School in Lakewood, Ohio, he was a four-time OHSAA champion at four different weight classes while wrestling for Greg Urbas. He was also the 2011 champion at the Walsh Ironman.

== College career ==
=== 2015 season ===
In 2015, Heil was an All-American, finishing fourth at the 2015 NCAA Division I Wrestling Championships.

=== 2016 season ===
He won an individual title at the 2016 NCAA Division I Wrestling Championships and lost only once during that season. He defeated University of Wyoming's Bryce Meredith 3-2 in the final. At the 2016 championships, he was the top seed.

=== 2017 season ===
Heil defended his title at the 2017 NCAA Division I Wrestling Championships, capping an undefeated season. He defeated Virginia's George DiCamillo 6-3 in the final.

=== 2018 season ===
Heil lost in the quarterfinals to eventual champion Yianni Diakomihalis of Cornell (who eventually became the fifth four-time NCAA champion) then lost his next match, finishing outside of All-American honors.
