= Austin O'Connor (wrestler) =

American wrestler (born 1998)

Personal information
- Born: May 14, 1998 (age 28) Lockport, Illinois, U.S.
- Height: 1.73 m (5 ft 8 in)

Sport
- Country: United States
- Sport: Wrestling
- Weight class: 154 lb (70 kg)
- Event(s): Freestyle and Folkstyle
- College team: North Carolina
- Club: Tar Heel Wrestling Club
- Coached by: Coleman Scott; Tony Ramos; Jamill Kelly; Mohamed Abdelfatah
Medal record
Men's collegiate wrestling
Representing the North Carolina Tar Heels
NCAA Division I Championships
| Gold medal – first place | 2021 St. Louis | 149 lb |
| Gold medal – first place | 2023 Tulsa | 157 lb |
| Bronze medal – third place | 2019 Pittsburgh | 149 lb |
ACC Championships
| Gold medal – first place | 2020 Pittsburgh | 149 lb |
| Gold medal – first place | 2021 Raleigh | 149 lb |
| Gold medal – first place | 2023 Raleigh | 157 lb |
| Silver medal – second place | 2019 Blacksburg | 149 lb |
| Silver medal – second place | 2022 Charlottesville | 157 lb |

Austin O'Connor (born May 14, 1998) is an American folkstyle wrestler from Lockport, Illinois. During his collegiate career, O'Connor was a two-time NCAA Wrestling Champion for the University of North Carolina. He won his first NCAA Title in 2021 in the 149lb weight class. Two years later in 2023, he followed up with another NCAA title at 157lbs. In total during his collegiate career, O'Connor was a five-time All-American, three-time conference champion and two-time national champion.

== High school career ==
O'Connor was a four-time wrestling state champion in the state of Illinois for St. Rita of Cascia High School located in Ashburn, Chicago.

== College career ==
O'Connor finished his collegiate career as a five-time All-American, three-time ACC Champion, and two-time National Champion for The University of North Carolina at Chapel Hill as a wrestler.

== MMA career ==
O'Connor has signed a management deal with American Kickboxing Academy. Other notable wrestlers that are part of AKA include Daniel Cormier, Khabib Nurmagomedov, and B.J. Penn.

== Freestyle career ==
In his debut for Real American Freestyle, O'Connor was defeated by Austin Gomez at RAF 03 on November 29, 2025.
