= Frank Molinaro =

American wrestler and coach

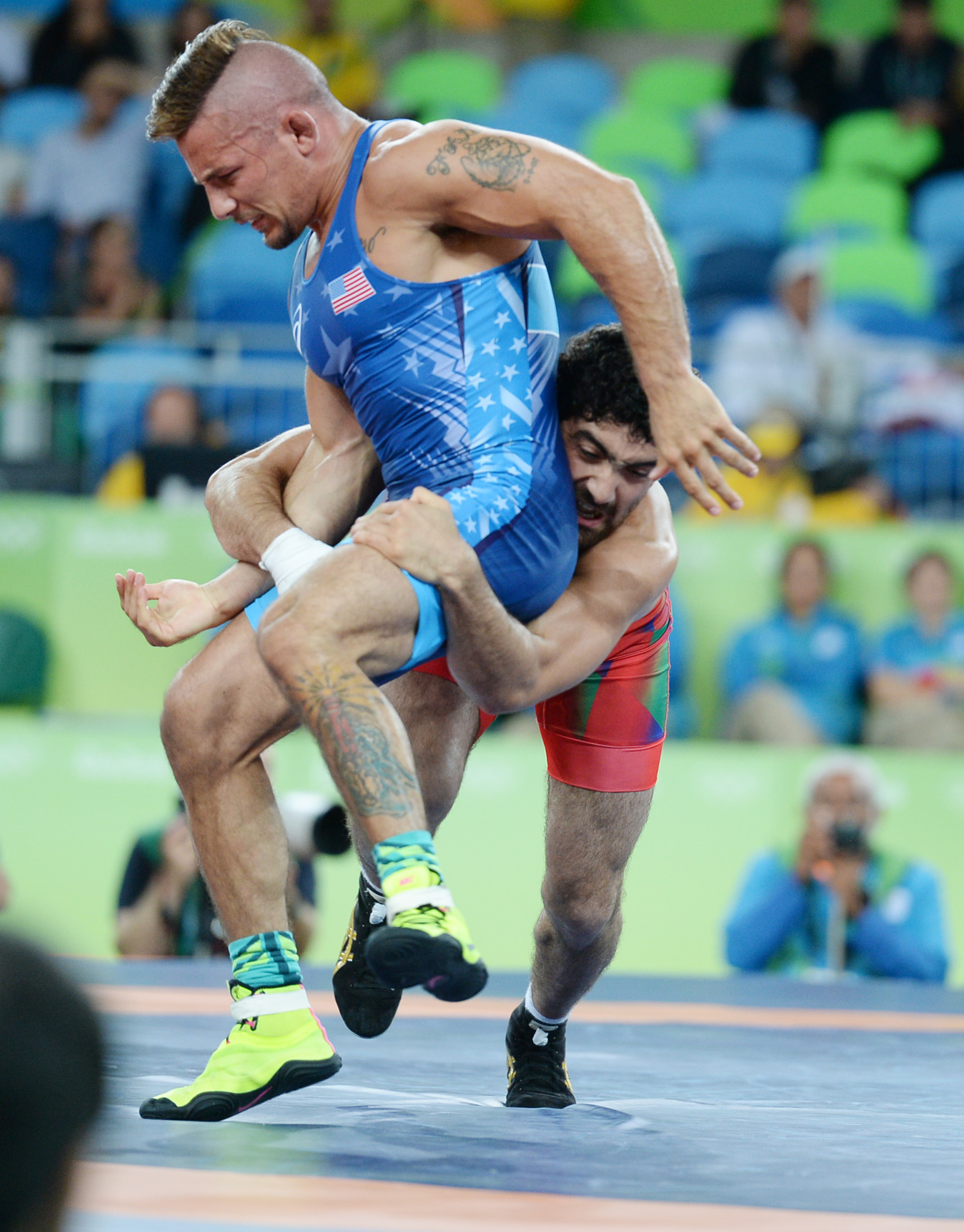
- Molinaro at the 2016 Olympics

Personal information
- Born: December 27, 1988 (age 37) Barnegat Township, New Jersey, U.S.
- Height: 5 ft 5 in (1.65 m)
- Weight: 149 lb (68 kg)
- Spouse: Kera Bolen
- Website: www.gorillahulk.com

Sport
- Country: United States
- Sport: Wrestling
- Weight class: 65 kilograms (143 lb)
- Events: Freestyle and Folkstyle
- College team: Penn State
- Club: Nittany Lion Wrestling Club; Titan Mercury Wrestling Club
- Team: USA
- Coached by: Cael Sanderson
Medal record
Men's freestyle wrestling
Representing the United States
World Cup
| Silver medal – second place | 2017 Kermanshah | Team |
Pan American Championships
| Gold medal – first place | 2016 Frisco | 70 kg |
| Bronze medal – third place | 2014 Mexico City | 65 kg |
Golden Grand Prix Ivan Yarygin
| Bronze medal – third place | 2018 Krasnoyarsk | 70 kg |
Grand Prix of Germany
| Silver medal – second place | 2016 Dortmund | 65 kg |
Grand Prix of Spain
| Gold medal – first place | 2015 Madrid | 65 kg |
Continental Cup
| Silver medal – second place | 2019 Khasavjurt | 70 kg |
Bill Farrell International
| Silver medal – second place | 2019 New York | 65 kg |
Dave Shultz Memorial International
| Gold medal – first place | 2014 Colorado Springs | 65 kg |
| Gold medal – first place | 2019 Colorado Springs | 70 kg |
New York Athletic Club International
| Gold medal – first place | 2013 New York | 65 kg |
US Open Championships
| Gold medal – first place | 2017 Las Vegas | 65 kg |
Men's collegiate wrestling
Representing the Penn State Nittany Lions
NCAA Division I Championships
| Gold medal – first place | 2012 St. Louis | 149 lb |
| Silver medal – second place | 2011 Philadelphia | 149 lb |
Big Ten Championships
| Gold medal – first place | 2011 Evanston | 149 lb |
| Gold medal – first place | 2012 West Lafayette | 149 lb |

Frank Molinaro (born December 27, 1988) is an American wrestler and coach. He was the 2012 NCAA champion at 149 lbs. with an undefeated season record of 33–0, helping him become a four-time NCAA Division I All-American at Penn State. In 2016, Molinaro won the US Olympic Team Trials, earning the ability to qualify and represent the United States at the 2016 Summer Olympics at 65 kg. Molinaro would finish the Rio Olympics in fifth place after losing to Italy's Frank Chamizo Marquez in the bronze-medal match 5–3.

== Career ==
=== High school ===
A native of Middletown Township, New Jersey, Molinaro was a three-time New Jersey state champion at Manahawkin's Southern Regional High School and placed second at High School Nationals.

=== College ===
After a redshirt season in his freshman year at Penn State, Molinaro claimed All-American honors four times, becoming the fifth Penn State wrestler to be a four time All-American. Molinaro was also a two-time Big Ten champion in 2011 and 2012.

At the 2012 Big Ten championships, Molinaro earned a pin and two technical falls on his way through the finals without giving up a point, winning the Outstanding Wrestler Award.

| Class | Year | Weight | Record | NCAA National Finish |
|---|---|---|---|---|
| Freshman | 2008-09 | 141 | 23-19 | 8th |
| Sophomore | 2009-10 | 149 | 33-7 | 5th |
| Junior | 2010-11 | 149 | 32-3 | 2nd |
| Senior | 2011-12 | 149 | 33-0 | 1st |

While Molinaro was at Penn State University, Cael Sanderson was hired as head coach of the program, developing a national championship program with Molinaro claiming an individual title in 2012 at 149 lbs.

=== Professional ===
Molinaro is a Competing Member of the Association of Career Wrestlers. He is also currently pursuing an international wrestling career training with the Nittany Lion Wrestling Club. In 2017, Molinaro was hired as an assistant for the Virginia Tech wrestling program. He left in December 2018 to train at the Oklahoma Regional Training Center. After failing to qualify for the 2021 Olympic team due to a loss to Yianni Diakomihalis in the quarterfinals of the US Olympic Team Trials, Frank left his shoes on the mat signifying his retirement from competitive wrestling.

== International ==
Molinaro won the gold medal in 2019 & 2014 at the Dave Shultz Memorial International, winning the Outstanding Wrestler Award in 2014. Also in 2019, he won Silver at both the Continental Cup and the Bill Farrell International. In 2018 he won a bronze medal at the Golden Grand Prix Ivan Yarygin. In World Cup competition he took silver in 2017, and in 2016 during the Olympic year, Molinaro peaked at the right time becoming the 2016 World Cup Champion at 65 kg. going 4-0 for Team USA. At the Pan American Championships, Molinaro won the gold medal in 2016 and Bronze in 2014 for the United States.

Other International tournament results for Molinaro include, a silver medal at the 2016 Grand Prix of Germany, a gold medal at the 2015 Grand Prix of Spain, and a gold medal at the 2013 New York Athletic Club International, winning the Outstanding Wrestler Award.

- Molinaro is a five-time USA Freestyle National Team Member - (2019, 2018, 2017, 2016, and 2014).

At the 2017 US Open Final - Frank Molinaro vs. Jordan Oliver, was a match that lived up to the excitement surrounding it. Molinaro went up 2-0 after the first period, but a takedown and exposure put Oliver up 4–2. With less than 45 seconds left in the match, Molinaro scored a go-behind takedown to tie it, but in the end, it was Oliver holding criteria, 4-4. However, after a doping violation by Oliver, USA Wrestling announced that Molinaro would in turn be named the 2017 U.S. Open National Champion at 65 kilograms.

=== 2016 Summer Olympics ===
In 2016, Molinaro won the US Olympic Team Trials, earning the ability to qualify and represent the United States at the 2016 Summer Olympics at 65 kg. Molinaro originally failed to qualify in Istanbul after losing to Borislav Novachkov. Molinaro eventually gained entry to the Olympics due to other wrestlers being disqualified for doping offenses and the transfer of licenses from other qualifying tournaments. In his case, it was Novachkov's license transferred to the earlier Mongolia qualifier that opened a spot for Molinaro. After his loss in the quarterfinals to Toghrul Asgarov, Molinaro was pulled into the repechage to wrestle Andriy Kvyatkovskyy. Molinaro defeated Kvyatkovskyy with a score of 8–5. In a moment of controversy, a frustrated Kvyatkovskyy bit the arm of Molinaro. Molinaro would finish the Rio Olympics in 5th place, after losing to Italy's Frank Chamizo Marquez in the bronze medal match 5–3.

=== Coaching History ===
| University | Position | Start year | End year | Team Accomplishments |
|---|---|---|---|---|
| Arizona State University | Assistant Coach | 2020 | Current | 2021, 2022 Pac-12 Champions / 2021, 2022 NCAA - 4th Place |
| Virginia Tech | Assistant Coach | 2017 | 2018 | 2017 ACC Champions |
| Penn State University | Volunteer Assistant Coach | 2014 | 2016 | 2016 NCAA Champions / 2016 Big 10 Champions |
| Rutgers University | Assistant Coach | 2012 | 2014 | |

== Personal life ==
Molinaro lives in Tempe, Arizona with his wife, Kera and three sons.

== See also ==
- List of Pennsylvania State University Olympians
