= 2017 Wrestling World Cup – Men's freestyle =

Men's freestyle at the 2017 Wrestling World Cup
- Location: Kermanshah, Iran
- Dates: 16–17 February

Medalists
gold medal	Iran
silver medal	United States
bronze medal	Azerbaijan

The 2017 Wrestling World Cup – Men's freestyle was the last of a set of three Wrestling World Cups in 2017 which were held in Kermanshah, Iran on 16–17 February 2017.

Initially the United States' team was having trouble entering the country to participate in the tournament due to visa issues. The root of the problem was Iran's counter measures to US travel ban blocking the entry of residents from predominantly Muslim countries into United States. However after the requests from both Iranian and American wrestling federations the visa issues got resolved on 6 February 2017, and U.S team was eligible to join the tournament.

== Pool stage ==
Team competes for 1st place
Team competes for 3rd place
Team competes for 5th place
Team competes for 7th place

=== Pool A ===
Team	Pld	W	L
United States	3	3	0
Azerbaijan	3	2	1
Russia	3	1	2
Georgia	3	0	3

POOL A
Round I

Azerbaijan 4.df - 4 Russia
Weight	Azerbaijan	result	Russia
57 kg	Giorgi Edisherashvili	2 – 5	Artyom Gebekov
61 kg	Ali Rahimzadeh	6 – 6	Dzhamal Otarsultanov
65 kg	Haji Aliyev	2 – 1	Alan Gogayev
70 kg	David Suynyuchkhan	6 – 10	Magomedkhabib Kadimagomedov
74 kg	Jabrayil Hasanov	6 – 2	Radik Valiev
86 kg	Sharif Sharifov	1 – 2	Vladislav Valiev
97 kg	Nurmagomed Gadzhiev	1 – 2	Rasul Magomedov
125 kg	Jamaladdin Magomedov	8 – 1	Vladislav Baitcaev

Georgia 1 - 7 United States
Weight	Georgia	result	United States
57 kg	Otari Gogava	1 – 6	Tony Ramos
61 kg	Shota Phartenadze	4 – 7	Logan Stieber
65 kg	Iveriko Julakidze	1 – 10	Frank Molinaro
70 kg	Levan Kelekhsashvili	0 – 10	James Green
74 kg	Jumber Kvelashvili	2 – 2	Jordan Burroughs
86 kg	Dato Marsagishvili	3 – 8	David Taylor
97 kg	Zviadi Metreveli	0 – 11	Kyle Snyder
125 kg	Geno Petriashvili	11 – 0	Zach Rey

Round II

United States 6 - 2 Russia
Weight	United States	result	Russia
57 kg	Tony Ramos	2 – 6	Artyom Gebekov
61 kg	Logan Stieber	7 – 4	Viktor Rassadin
65 kg	Frank Molinaro	4 – 4	Chermen Valiev
70 kg	James Green	8 – 6	Magomedkhabib Kadimagomedov
74 kg	Jordan Burroughs	10 – 1	Atsamaz Sanakoev
86 kg	David Taylor	14 – 4	Vladislav Valiev
97 kg	Kyle Snyder	11 – 2	Yuri Belonovski
125 kg	Zach Rey	4 – 1	Mukhamagazi Magomedov

Georgia 3 - 5 Azerbaijan
Weight	Georgia	result	Azerbaijan
57 kg	Otari Gogava	5 – 5	Makhir Amiraslanov
61 kg	Georgi Revazshvili	2 – 12	Ali Rahimzadeh
65 kg	Iveriko Julakidze	0 – 12	Haji Aliyev
70 kg	Konstantin Khabalashvili	5 – 7	David Suynyuchkhan
74 kg	Jumber Kvelashvili	0 – 5	Jabrayil Hasanov
86 kg	David Khutsishvili	2 – 2	Sharif Sharifov
97 kg	Zviadi Metreveli	0 – 10	Aslanbek Alborov
125 kg	Geno Petriashvili	13 – 7	Jamaladdin Magomedov

Round III

Georgia 3 - 5 Russia
Weight	Georgia	result	Russia
57 kg	Beka Bujiashvili	2 – 10	Zelimkhan Abakarov
61 kg	Shota Phartenadze	4 – 14	Viktor Rassadin
65 kg	Iveriko Julakidze	7 – 12	Chermen Valiev
70 kg	Konstantin Khabalashvili	2 – 2	Alibek Akbaev
74 kg	Jakob Makarashvili	4 – 2	Radik Valiev
86 kg	David Khutsishvili	0 – 10	Akhmed Magamaev
97 kg	Zviadi Metreveli	–	Yuri Belonovski or Rasul Magomedov
125 kg	Geno Petriashvili	–	Vladislav Baitcaev or Mukhamagazi Magomedov

United States 4.df - 4 Azerbaijan
Weight	United States	result	Azerbaijan
57 kg	Tony Ramos	2 – 3	Giorgi Edisherashvili
61 kg	Logan Stieber	12 – 11	Ali Rahimzadeh
65 kg	Frank Molinaro	1 – 4	Haji Aliyev
70 kg	James Green	10 – 0	David Suynyuchkhan
74 kg	Jordan Burroughs	4 – 5^{F}	Murad Suleymanov
86 kg	David Taylor	12 – 2	Sharif Sharifov
97 kg	Kyle Snyder	4 – 5	Aslanbek Alborov
125 kg	Nick Gwiazdowski	1 – 3	Jamaladdin Magomedov

=== Pool B ===
Team	Pld	W	L
Iran	3	3	0
Turkey	3	2	1
Mongolia	3	1	2
India	3	0	3

POOL B
Round I

Turkey 0 - 8 Iran
Weight	Turkey	result	Iran
57 kg	Sezar Akgül	0 – 6	Hassan Rahimi
61 kg	Cengizhan Erdogan	5 – 7	Behnam Ehsanpour
65 kg	Mustafa Kaya	2 – 5	Meisam Nasiri
70 kg	Yakup Gör	0 – 4	Mostafa Hosseinkhani
74 kg	İslam Kılıç	10 – 12	Peyman Yarahmadi
86 kg	Serdar Böke	1 – 11	Hassan Yazdani
97 kg	Faruk Akkoyun	0 – 10	Amir Mohammadi
125 kg	Salim Ercan	0 – 10	Komeil Ghasemi

Mongolia 7 - 1 India
Weight	Mongolia	result	India
57 kg	Zanabazar Zandanbud	–	by forfeit
61 kg	Enkhsaikhany Nyam-Ochir	4 – 2	Harphool
65 kg	Batchuluuny Batmagnai	3 – 1	Bajrang Punia
70 kg	Ganzorigiin Mandakhnaran	4 – 3	Amit Kumar Dhankar
74 kg	Batchuluuny Ankhbayar	8 – 7	Jitender
86 kg	Pürevjavyn Önörbat	7 – 8^{F}	Deepak
97 kg	Batsul Ulzisaikhan	14 – 6	Roublejit Singh Rangi
125 kg	Natsagsürengiin Zolboo	3 – 0	Krishan

Round II

India 0 - 8 Iran
Weight	India	result	Iran
57 kg	by forfeit	–	Younes Sarmasti
61 kg	Harphool	2 – 4^{F}	Masoud Esmaeilpour
65 kg	Bajrang Punia	2 – 9	Meisam Nasiri
70 kg	Amit Kumar Dhankar	0 – 11	Mostafa Hosseinkhani
74 kg	Jitender	2 – 8	Bahman Teymouri
86 kg	Deepak	0 – 10	Alireza Karimi
97 kg	Roublejit Singh Rangi	0 – 10	Hossein Shahbazi
125 kg	Krishan(Injury Default)	–	Komeil Ghasemi

Mongolia 3 - 5 Turkey
Weight	Mongolia	result	Turkey
57 kg	Sodnomdashiin Batbold	6 – 6^{F}	Sezar Akgül
61 kg	Enkhsaikhany Nyam-Ochir	2 – 4	Cengizhan Erdogan
65 kg	Batchuluuny Batmagnai	3 – 9	Mustafa Kaya
70 kg	Ganzorigiin Mandakhnaran	6 – 0	Yakup Gör
74 kg	Batchuluuny Ankhbayar	1 – 12	İslam Kılıç
86 kg	Pürevjavyn Önörbat	1 – 10	Selim Yaşar
97 kg	Batsul Ulzisaikhan	7 – 4	Faruk Akkoyun
125 kg	Natsagsürengiin Zolboo	6 – 2	Rıza Yıldırım

Round III

Mongolia 1 - 7 Iran
Weight	Mongolia	result	Iran
57 kg	Zanabazar Zandanbud	6 – 7	Hassan Rahimi
61 kg	Tulga Tumurochir	0 – 4	Masoud Esmaeilpour
65 kg	Batchuluuny Batmagnai	4 – 3	Mohammed Mehdi Yeganehjafari
70 kg	Ganzorigiin Mandakhnaran	0 – 10	Hamed Rashidi
74 kg	Batchuluuny Ankhbayar	0 – 10	Peyman Yarahmadi
86 kg	Pürevjavyn Önörbat	2 – 11	Hassan Yazdani
97 kg	Batsul Ulzisaikhan	1 – 4	Amir Mohammadi
125 kg	Natsagsürengiin Zolboo	0 – 5	Komeil Ghasemi

India 1 - 7 Turkey
Weight	India	result	Turkey
57 kg	by forfeit	–	Sezar Akgül
61 kg	Harphool	–	by forfeit
65 kg	Bajrang Punia	0 – 10	Mustafa Kaya
70 kg	Amit Kumar Dhankar	0 – 10	Yakup Gör
74 kg	Jitender	0 – 11	İslam Kılıç
86 kg	Deepak	2 – 9	Selim Yaşar
97 kg	Roublejit Singh Rangi	3 – 11	Faruk Akkoyun
125 kg	by forfeit	–	Salim Ercan

== Medal Matches ==
Medal Matches
First-Place Match

United States 3 - 5 Iran
Weight	United States	result	Iran
57 kg	Tony Ramos	0 – 6	Hassan Rahimi
61 kg	Logan Stieber	2 – 6	Masoud Esmaeilpour
65 kg	Frank Molinaro	4 – 5	Meisam Nasiri
70 kg	James Green	0 – 2	Mostafa Hosseinkhani
74 kg	Jordan Burroughs	3 – 2	Peyman Yarahmadi
86 kg	David Taylor	8^{F} – 4	Hassan Yazdani
97 kg	Kyle Snyder	6 – 0	Amir Mohammadi
125 kg	Nick Gwiazdowski	0 – 5	Komeil Ghasemi

Third-Place Match

Azerbaijan 7 - 1 Turkey
Weight	Azerbaijan	result	Turkey
57 kg	Giorgi Edisherashvili	8 – 7	Sezar Akgül
61 kg	Ali Rahimzadeh	–	by forfeit
65 kg	Haji Aliyev	12 – 2	Mustafa Kaya
70 kg	David Suynyuchkhan	2 – 10	Yakup Gör
74 kg	Murad Suleymanov	5 – 0	İslam Kılıç
86 kg	Sharif Sharifov	2 – 1	Selim Yaşar
97 kg	Aslanbek Alborov	9 – 1	Faruk Akkoyun
125 kg	Jamaladdin Magomedov	4^{F} – 0	Salim Ercan

Fifth-Place Match

Russia 7 - 1 Mongolia
Weight	Russia	result	Mongolia
57 kg	Zelimkhan Abakarov	10 – 0	Sodnomdashiin Batbold
61 kg	Dzhamal Otarsultanov	4 – 1	Tulga Tumurochir
65 kg	Alan Gogayev	9 – 2	Batchuluuny Batmagnai
70 kg	Magomedkhabib Kadimagomedov	7 – 14	Ganzorigiin Mandakhnaran
74 kg	Atsamaz Sanakoev	12 – 1	Batchuluuny Ankhbayar
86 kg	Akhmed Magamaev	10 – 0	Pürevjavyn Önörbat
97 kg	Rasul Magomedov	11 – 3	Batsul Ulzisaikhan
125 kg	Vladislav Baitcaev	6 – 0	Natsagsürengiin Zolboo

Seventh-Place Match

Georgia 7 - 1 India
Weight	Georgia	result	India
57 kg	Otari Gogava	–	by forfeit
61 kg	Georgi Revazshvili	12^{F} 11 –	Harphool
65 kg	Iveriko Julakidze	6 – 16	Bajrang Punia
70 kg	Levan Kelekhsashvili	7 – 6	Amit Kumar Dhankar
74 kg	Jakob Makarashvili	5 – 3	Jitender
86 kg	Dato Marsagishvili	10 – 0	Deepak
97 kg	Zviadi Metreveli	8 – 0	Roublejit Singh Rangi
125 kg	Geno Petriashvili	–	by forfeit

== Final classement ==
Team	Pld	W	L
Iran	4	4	0
United States	4	3	1
Azerbaijan	4	3	1
Turkey	4	2	2
Russia	4	2	2
Mongolia	4	1	3
Georgia	4	1	3
India	4	0	4

== See also ==
- 2017 Wrestling World Cup - Men's Greco-Roman
