= 2016 Wrestling World Cup – Men's freestyle =

Men's freestyle at the 2016 Wrestling World Cup
- Location: Los Angeles, United States
- Dates: 11–12 June

Medalists
gold medal	Iran
silver medal	Russia
bronze medal	Georgia

The 2016 Wrestling World Cup – Men's freestyle was The last of a set of three Wrestling World Cups in 2016.

== Pool stage ==
Team competes for 1st place
Team competes for 3rd place
Team competes for 5th place
Team competes for 7th place

=== Pool A ===
Team	Pld	W	L
Iran	3	3	0
United States	3	2	1
Azerbaijan	3	1	2
India	3	0	3

POOL A
Round I

Iran 5 - 3 Azerbaijan
Weight	Iran	result	Azerbaijan
57 kg	Hassan Rahimi	11 – 1	Makhmud Magomedov
61 kg	Behnam Ehsanpour	2 – 2	Akhmednabi Gvarzatilov
65 kg	Meisam Nasiri	7 – 6	Magomed Muslimov
70 kg	Mostafa Hosseinkhani	3 – 6	Gadzhimurad Omarov
74 kg	Hassan Yazdani	9 – 5	Ashraf Aliyev
86 kg	Alireza Karimi	2 – 5	Aleksander Gostiev
97 kg	Abbas Tahan	0 – 2	Aslanbek Alborov
125 kg	Komeil Ghasemi	5 – 4	Said Gamidov

United States 7 - 1 India
Weight	United States	result	India
57 kg	Daniel Dennis	W	Amit Kumar
61 kg	Tony Ramos	3 – 3	Bajrang Punia
65 kg	Frank Molinaro	5 – 0	Rajneesh Rajneesh
70 kg	James Green	10 – 0	Vinod Kumar Omprakash
74 kg	Alex Dieringer	4 – 5	Parveen Rana
86 kg	J'den Cox	13 – 2	Pawan Kumar
97 kg	Kyle Snyder	10 – 0	Saywart Kadian
125 kg	Jake Varner	W	Hitender Beniwal

Round II

Iran 4 df. - 4 United States
Weight	Iran	result	United States
57 kg	Hassan Rahimi	7 – 2	Daniel Dennis
61 kg	Masoud Esmaeilpour	8 – 2	Tony Ramos
65 kg	Seyed Ahmad Mohammadi	3 – 4	Frank Molinaro
70 kg	Mostafa Hosseinkhani	2 – 5	James Green
74 kg	Hassan Yazdani	10 – 0	Alex Dieringer
86 kg	Alireza Karimi	2 – 6	J'den Cox
97 kg	Abbas Tahan	1 – 8	Kyle Snyder
125 kg	Parviz Hadi	3 – 1	Jake Varner

Azerbaijan 7 - 1 India
Weight	Azerbaijan	result	India
57 kg	Makhmud Magomedov	W –	Amit Kumar
61 kg	Jahid Hasanzade	3 – 9	Bajrang Punia
65 kg	Magomed Muslimov	4 – 0	Rajneesh Rajneesh
70 kg	Gadzhimurad Omarov	12 – 0	Vinod Kumar Omprakash
74 kg	Ashraf Aliyev	10 – 0	Parveen Rana
86 kg	Magomedhadshi Khatiev	6 – 1	Pawan Kumar
97 kg	Aslanbek Alborov	W –	Saywart Kadian
125 kg	Said Gamidov	W –	Hitender Beniwal

Round III

Iran 8 - 0 India
Weight	Iran	result	India
57 kg	Reza Atri	W –	Amit Kumar
61 kg	Masoud Esmaeilpour	4 – 2	Bajrang Punia
65 kg	Seyed Ahmad Mohammadi	12 – 2	Rajneesh Rajneesh
70 kg	Mostafa Hosseinkhani	2 – 0	Vinod Kumar Omprakash
74 kg	Hassan Yazdani	12 – 2	Parveen Rana
86 kg	Alireza Karimi	10 – 0	Pawan Kumar
97 kg	Amir Mohammadi	12 – 1	Saywart Kadian
125 kg	Parviz Hadi	W –	Hitender Beniwal

United States 8 - 0 Azerbaijan
Weight	United States	result	Azerbaijan
57 kg	Daniel Dennis	10 – 0	Makhmud Magomedov
61 kg	Tony Ramos	10 – 4	Akhmednabi Gvarzatilov
65 kg	Frank Molinaro	4 – 1	Magomed Muslimov
70 kg	James Green	10 – 0	Gadzhimurad Omarov
74 kg	Alex Dieringer	8 – 0	Ashraf Aliyev
86 kg	J'den Cox	3 – 2	Aleksander Gostiev
97 kg	'Kyle Snyder	2 – 1	Aslanbek Alborov
125 kg	Jake Varner	10 – 0	Said Gamidov

=== Pool B ===
Team	Pld	W	L
Russia	3	3	0
Georgia	3	2	1
Mongolia	3	1	2
Turkey	3	0	3

POOL B
Round I

Russia 4 df. - 4 Georgia
Weight	Russia	result	Georgia
57 kg	Gadzhimurad Rashidov	2 – 3	Vladimer Khinchegashvili
61 kg	Imam Adzhiev	1 – 4	Beka Lomtadze
65 kg	Magomed Kurbanaliev	6 – 1	Zurabi Iakobishvili
70 kg	Radik Valiev	4 – 13	Davit Tlashadze
74 kg	Khetag Tsabolov	10 – 0	Jumber Kvelashvili
86 kg	Shamil Kudiyamagomedov	9 – 3	Dato Marsagishvili
97 kg	Abdusalam Gadisov	10 – 9	Elizbar Odikadze
125 kg	Muradin Kushkhov	0 – 4	Geno Petriashvili

Mongolia 6 - 2 Turkey
Weight	Mongolia	result	Turkey
57 kg	Erdenebatyn Bekhbayar	0 – 14	Süleyman Atlı
61 kg	Tümenbilegiin Tüvshintulga	14^{F} – 0	Mehmet Söyler
65 kg	Ganzorigiin Mandakhnaran	10 – 0	Servet Coşkun
70 kg	Batchuluuny Batmagnai	10 – 8	Selahattin Kılıçsallayan
74 kg	Pürevjavyn Önörbat	W –	Soner Demirtaş
86 kg	Orgodolyn Üitümen	3 – 10	Selim Yaşar
97 kg	Dorjkhandyn Khüderbulga	8 – 2	Müren Fikret Mutlu
125 kg	Jargalsaikhany Chuluunbat	W –	Taha Akgül

Round II

Russia 6 - 2 Turkey
Weight	Russia	result	Turkey
57 kg	Gadzhimurad Rashidov	10 – 4	Süleyman Atlı
61 kg	Imam Adzhiev	10 – 0	Mehmet Söyler
65 kg	Ilyas Bekbulatov	7^{F} – 2	Burak Doğan
70 kg	Radik Valiev	13 – 1	Selahattin Kılıçsallayan
74 kg	Atsamaz Sanakoev	W –	Soner Demirtaş
86 kg	Aleksander Zelenkov	1 – 4	Selim Yaşar
97 kg	Adlan Ibragimov	5 – 6	Müren Fikret Mutlu
125 kg	Pavel Krivtsov	W –	Taha Akgül

Georgia 4 df. - 4 Mongolia
Weight	Georgia	result	Mongolia
57 kg	Vladimer Khinchegashvili	4 – 1	Erdenebatyn Bekhbayar
61 kg	Beka Lomtadze	4 – 4	Tümenbilegiin Tüvshintulga
65 kg	Zurabi Iakobishvili	2 – 3	Ganzorigiin Mandakhnaran
70 kg	Davit Tlashadze	6 – 2	Altangerel Dorjsegmet
74 kg	Jakob Makarashvili	4 – 5	Pürevjavyn Önörbat
86 kg	Sandro Aminashvili	2 – 12	Orgodolyn Üitümen
97 kg	Elizbar Odikadze	11 – 0	Dorjkhandyn Khüderbulga
125 kg	Geno Petriashvili	11 – 0	Jargalsaikhany Chuluunbat

Round III

Russia 6 - 2 Mongolia
Weight	Russia	result	Mongolia
57 kg	Azamat Tuskaev	3 – 5	Erdenebatyn Bekhbayar
61 kg	Viktor Rassadin	11 – 3	Tümenbilegiin Tüvshintulga
65 kg	Ilyas Bekbulatov	7 – 5	Ganzorigiin Mandakhnaran
70 kg	Khalil Aminov	11 – 0	Batchuluuny Batmagnai
74 kg	Khetag Tsabolov	2 – 10	Pürevjavyn Önörbat
86 kg	Shamil Kudiyamagomedov	7 – 0	Orgodolyn Üitümen
97 kg	Abdusalam Gadisov	11 – 1	Dorjkhandyn Khüderbulga
125 kg	Muradin Kushkhov	7 – 1	Jargalsaikhany Chuluunbat

Georgia 7 - 1 Turkey
Weight	Georgia	result	Turkey
57 kg	Vladimer Khinchegashvili	7 – 1	Süleyman Atlı
61 kg	Beka Lomtadze	12 – 4	Burak Doğan
65 kg	Zurabi Iakobishvili	10 – 0	Mehmet Söyler
70 kg	Davit Tlashadze	8 – 6	Selahattin Kılıçsallayan
74 kg	Jakob Makarashvili	W –	Soner Demirtaş
86 kg	Sandro Aminashvili	6 – 6	Selim Yaşar
97 kg	Elizbar Odikadze	6 – 3	Müren Fikret Mutlu
125 kg	Geno Petriashvili	W –	Taha Akgül

== Medal Matches ==
Medal Matches
First-Place Match

Iran 5 - 3 Russia
Weight	Iran	result	Russia
57 kg	Hassan Rahimi	3 – 3	Gadzhimurad Rashidov
61 kg	Masoud Esmaeilpour	12 – 6	Viktor Rassadin
65 kg	Meisam Nasiri	1 – 4	Magomed Kurbanaliev
70 kg	Mostafa Hosseinkhani	10 – 1	Khalil Aminov
74 kg	Hassan Yazdani	14 – 4	Khetag Tsabolov
86 kg	Alireza Karimi	3 – 6	Shamil Kudiyamagomedov
97 kg	Amir Mohammadi	3 – 10	Abdusalam Gadisov
125 kg	Komeil Ghasemi	3 – 2	Muradin Kushkhov

Third-Place Match

Georgia 4 df. - 4 United States
Weight	Georgia	result	United States
57 kg	Vladimer Khinchegashvili	8^{F} – 6	Daniel Dennis
61 kg	Beka Lomtadze	8 – 5	Tony Ramos
65 kg	Zurabi Iakobishvili	4 – 4	Frank Molinaro
70 kg	Davit Tlashadze	0 – 10	James Green
74 kg	Jakob Makarashvili	1 – 10	Alex Dieringer
86 kg	Dato Marsagishvili	7 – 4	J'den Cox
97 kg	Elizbar Odikadze	3 – 3	Kyle Snyder
125 kg	Geno Petriashvili	6 – 2	Zach Rey

Fifth-Place Match

Azerbaijan 5 - 3 Mongolia
Weight	Azerbaijan	result	Mongolia
57 kg	Makhmud Magomedov	11 – 0	Batbold Sodnomdash
61 kg	Akhmednabi Gvarzatilov	10 – 0	Tümenbilegiin Tüvshintulga
65 kg	Magomed Muslimov	3 – 7	Ganzorigiin Mandakhnaran
70 kg	Gadzhimurad Omarov	6 – 5	Altangerel Dorjsegmet
74 kg	Ashraf Aliyev	0 – 7	Pürevjavyn Önörbat
86 kg	Magomedhadshi Khatiev	6 – 4^{F}	Orgodolyn Üitümen
97 kg	Aslanbek Alborov	6 – 1	Dorjkhandyn Khüderbulga
125 kg	Said Gamidov	6 – 2	Jargalsaikhany Chuluunbat

Seventh-Place Match

India 4 - 3 Turkey
Weight	India	result	Turkey
57 kg	Amit Kumar	– W	Süleyman Atlı
61 kg	Bajrang Punia	11 – 0	Mehmet Söyler
65 kg	Rajneesh Rajneesh	4 – 3	Servet Coşkun
70 kg	Vinod Kumar Omprakash	10 – 0	Selahattin Kılıçsallayan
74 kg	Parveen Rana	W –	Soner Demirtaş
86 kg	Pawan Kumar	0 – W	Selim Yaşar
97 kg	Saywart Kadian	– W	Müren Fikret Mutlu
125 kg	Hitender Beniwal	–	Taha Akgül

== Final classement ==
Team	Pld	W	L
Iran	4	4	0
Russia	4	3	1
Georgia	4	3	1
United States	4	2	2
Azerbaijan	4	2	2
Mongolia	4	1	3
India	4	1	3
Turkey	4	0	4

== See also ==
- 2016 Wrestling World Cup - Men's Greco-Roman
- 2016 World wrestling clubs Cup - Men's freestyle
