= James Green (wrestler) =

American wrestler (born 1992)

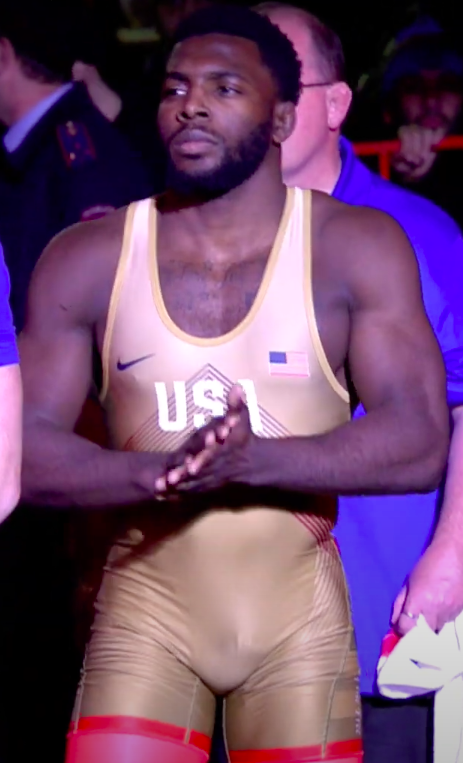
- Green in 2019

Personal information
- Native name: James Malcom Green Jr.
- Born: December 19, 1992 (age 33) Brooklyn, New York, U.S.
- Home town: Willingboro Township, New Jersey, U.S.
- Height: 5 ft 9 in (175 cm)
- Weight: 70 kg (154 lb)

Sport
- Country: United States
- Sport: Wrestling
- Weight class: 70 kg
- Events: Freestyle and Folkstyle
- College team: Nebraska
- Club: Nebraska Wrestling Training Center
- Coached by: Mark Manning
- Now coaching: Virginia Tech (assistant)
Medal record
Men's freestyle wrestling
Representing the United States
World Championships
Silver medal – second place	2017 Paris	70 kg
Bronze medal – third place	2015 Las Vegas	70 kg
World Cup
Gold medal – first place	2018 Iowa City	Team
Silver medal – second place	2017 Kermanshah	Team
Pan American Championships
Gold medal – first place	2017 Salvador	70 kg
Gold medal – first place	2018 Lima	70 kg
Silver medal – second place	2016 Frisco	70 kg
Yasar Dogu Tournament
Silver medal – second place	2022 Istanbul	70 kg
Bronze medal – third place	2026 Antalya	74 kg
University World Championships
Silver medal – second place	2014 Pecs	70 kg
US National Championships
Gold medal – first place	2017 Las Vegas	70 kg
Gold medal – first place	2021 Coralville	70 kg
Silver medal – second place	2019 Las Vegas	70 kg
Bronze medal – third place	2015 Las Vegas	70 kg
Men's collegiate wrestling
Representing the Nebraska Cornhuskers
NCAA Division I Championships
Bronze medal – third place	2014 Oklahoma City	157 lb
Bronze medal – third place	2015 St. Louis	157 lb
Big Ten Championships
Gold medal – first place	2014 Madison	157 lb
Silver medal – second place	2013 Champaign	157 lb
Bronze medal – third place	2015 Columbus	157 lb

James Malcom Green Jr. (born December 19, 1992) is an American freestyle wrestler and graduated folkstyle wrestler who competes at 70 kilograms.

His most successful year came in 2017, when he placed second at the World Championships and the World Cup and claimed the Pan American Continental Championship and the US Open National Championship, as well as other international titles. In college, Green was a four-time NCAA Division I All-American and a Big Ten Conference champion (two-time finalist) for the Nebraska Cornhuskers.

Green is currently assistant coach for the Virginia Tech Hokies.

== Background ==
Green was born in Brooklyn, New York City, and was raised in Willingboro Township, New Jersey, by his Jamaican father and American mother, along with two sisters. His father had moved to the United States as a teenager and opened up a recording studio, where he helped upcoming music talent. In 2003, when James was 10 years of age, Green's father was shot and killed by one of the people he helped, whom he was arguing with about studio fees and money for rent. Green was shown wrestling by his father, who was also a beginner, and was motivated to continue in the sport despite the passing of the latter by Bob Acosta, a friend of Green Sr, who would drive him out of town to train and compete as the wrestling community was not big in South Jersey. Green's story was featured in the FloFilm "Who is James Green?".

== Folkstyle career ==
=== High school ===
During his high school wrestling years, Green compiled a 148–8 record and claimed All–State honors three times, winning the NJSIAA state championship out of Willingboro High School as a senior in 2011, becoming the first to do so in the history of the school. After his championship season, Green claimed the NHSCA Senior National championship before being recruited by the Nebraska Cornhuskers.

=== College ===
In collegiate wrestling, Green went on to become a four–time NCAA Division I All–American (placing 7th, 7th, 3rd and 3rd) and a Big Ten Conference champion for the Cornhuskers, graduating in 2015 with a 124–18 record.

== Freestyle career ==
=== 2013–2016 ===
During 2013, his first year competing in senior freestyle, Green claimed the US University National championship, placing seventh at the Summer Universiade. In 2014, he made the move from 66 to 70 kilograms, and placed fifth at the US Open, became a two–time US University National champion, claimed the silver medal from the University World Championships and placed second at the US World Team Trials. In 2015, Green placed third at the US Nationals, claimed the Grand Prix of Spain while defeating recently crowned European Games silver medalist from Italy Frank Chamizo in the finale and made the US World Team, bringing a bronze medal from the World Championships.

During the 2016 Summer Olympic year, Green moved down to the Olympic weight class of 65 kilograms on the start of the year, and placed 17th at the Yasar Dogu International and second at the Pan American Continental Championships, before going 0–2 at the US Olympic Team Trials. Afterwards, Green moved up once again to his natural 70 kilogram class and went 4–0 at the World Cup, placed third at the Poland Open, once again grabbed the Grand Prix of Spain crown and made his second US World Team while defeating two–time NCAA champion Jordan Oliver, and finally placing seventh at the World Championships.

=== 2017–2018 ===
Green opened up what would end up being the most successful year of his career so far with a 3–1 record at the 2017 World Cup. After that, he went on to start a 20–match win–streak, where he claimed the Ukrainian Memorial International title, the US Open National championship, the Pan American Continental Championship, made his third–straight US World Team and placed himself on top of the Grand Prix of Spain podium before competing at the World Championships, defeating three opponents to make the gold–medal match, where he was derailed by '15 World Champion from Italy Frank Chamizo to claim the silver medal.

In 2018, Green once again opened up with a 3–1 record at the World Cup, helping Team USA reach the gold–medal. Afterwards, he claimed his second Pan American Continental title (helping the US sweep through all team titles), slipped past Cuba's two–time Pan American champion Franklin Maren for charity at Beat the Streets and made his fourth–straight US World Team, placing thirteenth at the World Championships. Before the year ended, Green competed one more time and placed third at the Alans International in Russia.

=== 2019–2020 ===
During his trip to Russia and Europe, Green also placed seventh at the prestigious Golden Grand Prix Ivan Yarygin 2019 in January. In his last tournament during the trip, he won bronze at the Dan Kolov – Nikola Petrov Memorial in Bulgaria. Green then went back to the United States, where after being upset in the US Open finale by Ryan Deakin, he downed recently crowned NCAA champion from Rutgers Anthony Ashnault for charity at Beat the Streets, ran through the US World Team Trials Challenge and defeated Deakin back–to–back in the rematches to make his fifth–straight US World Team. Afterwards, Green once again went overseas, placing eleventh at the Yasar Dogu International and the Aleksandr Medved Memorial, before his thirteenth–place finish at the World Championships.

During the 2020 Summer Olympic year, Green first intended to move up to 74 kilograms, but in his first tournament at the Matteo Pellicone Ranking Series, he was eliminated in the first round by technical fall. Green was then scheduled to compete at the US Olympic Team Trials, however, the event was postponed for the next year along with the Summer Olympics due to the rising COVID-19 pandemic. Green was able to compete once again in November, downing Iowa standout Alex Marinelli at the HWC Showdown Open. He then made the move down to 65 kilograms, competed at two of the series of events put on by FloWrestling, the RTC Cup and the Flo 8–man Challenge (150 pounds), where he racked up victories over the likes of U23 Cuban National champion Anthony Echemendia and multiple–time All–Americans Alec Pantaleo and Bryce Meredith, gave birth to a series with two–time Cadet World champion Yianni Diakomihalis and placed second at both tournaments.

=== 2021 ===
After downing another Iowa standout in Pat Lugo at another event by FloWrestling, Green competed at the Grand Prix de France Henri Deglane, where after notable wins over multiple–time South American champion Agustín Destribats and reigning U23 World champion from Azerbaijan Turan Bayramov, he was defeated by reigning Pan American Continental champion Yianni Diakomihalis in their rubber match, claiming silver. Green ultimately went 0–1 at the US Olympic Team Trials, falling to '18 US Open National champion Joseph McKenna in the first round.

After his failed attempt at 65 kg, Green returned to his competitive weight, going back up to 70 kilograms and claiming the US Open National Championship, defeating Matteo Pellicone Ranking Series 2021 winner Alec Pantaleo in the finale. Green had then been determined the U.S. representative for the Pan American Continental Championships, but did not attend the tournament, being replaced by Pantaleo. Instead, he competed at the prestigious 2021 Poland Open on June 8, where after a dominant win over Alec Pantaleo, Oleksii Boruta and World Champion Zurabi Iakobishvili on route to the finals, Green was upset by his now rival Pantaleo, claiming the silver medal.

Green competed at the 2021 US World Team Trials on September 11–12, intending to represent the country at the World Championships a sixth time. He downed everyone on his way to the top of the podium, most notably two-time NCAA champion Jordan Oliver and NCAA All-American Ryan Deakin. As a result, he represented the United States at the 2021 World Championships on October 4 in Oslo, Norway.

After two dominant victories to make the quarterfinals, Green was eliminated by U23 World Champion Turan Bayramov in a close match, and as the Azerbaijani lost his next bout to eventual champion Magomedmurad Gadzhiev, Green ended up placing seventh.

=== 2022–2023 ===
Green competed at the prestigious Golden Grand Prix Ivan Yarygin on January 28, 2022, but failed to place after losing to European Champion Kurban Shiraev. He bounced back by beating Dillon Williams on February 12 at Bout at the Ballpark. Green then competed at the prestigious Yasar Dogu International on February 27, claiming a silver medal.

On April 8, 2022, Green announced he would retire from the competitive side of the sport due to recurrent injuries, and would switch to coaching.

More than a year later, on June 27, 2023, Green announced he would be coming out of retirement after successful surgeries.

=== 2024 ===
In March, Green took fifth place at the Yasar Dogu International down at 65 kilograms, recording three wins and two losses in his first tournament since 2022. In April, Green competed at the US Olympic Team Trials, suffering a first-round loss to NCAA champion Jesse Mendez.

In September, Green competed at the US World Team Trials back at 70 kilograms, winning five matches, including victories over US National champions Jordan Oliver and Alec Pantaleo, to make his seventh US World Team.

In October, Green competed at the World Championships, though after a win over U20 World Champion Peiman Biabani from Canada, he was eliminated by European finalist Akaki Kemertelidze from Georgia, placing eleventh.

=== 2026 ===
Green won the 2026 US Open at 74 kilograms, qualifying him for Final X in June.

== Coaching career ==
After retiring from competing in freestyle on April 8, 2022, Green was named the National Freestyle Developmental Coach for USA Wrestling. On his first tournament as a coach, Green led Team USA to the 2022 U17 World Championship in freestyle. After 14 months in the position, Green stepped down to go back to competitive wrestling. On August 10, 2023, Green was named the assistant coach for the Nebraska Cornhuskers. He left Nebraska to become assistant coach for the Virginia Tech Hokies on April 30, 2026.

== Freestyle record ==
Freestyle Matches
Res.	Record	Opponent	Score	Date	Event	Location
2026 US World Team Trials (gold) at 74 kg
Win	167–52	(United States) David Carr	4–1	June 19, 2026	2026 Final X	(United States) Newark, New Jersey
Loss	166–52	(United States) David Carr	5–6	June 19, 2026	2026 Final X	(United States) Newark, New Jersey
Win	166–51	(United States) David Carr	6–3	June 19, 2026	2026 Final X	(United States) Newark, New Jersey
2026 US Open (gold) at 74 kg
Win	165–51	(United States) Kannon Webster	5–4	April 24–25, 2026	2026 US Open National Championships	(United States) Las Vegas, Nevada
Win	164–51	(United States) Cameron Amine	2–1	April 24–25, 2026	2026 US Open National Championships	(United States) Las Vegas, Nevada
Win	163–51	(United States) Will Lewan	TF 11–0	April 24–25, 2026	2026 US Open National Championships	(United States) Las Vegas, Nevada
Win	162–51	(United States) Joseph Sealey	3–2	April 24–25, 2026	2026 US Open National Championships	(United States) Las Vegas, Nevada
2026 Grand Prix Zagreb Open 5th at 74 kg
Loss	161-51	(France) Seyfulla Itaev	Fall	February 4, 2026	2026 Grand Prix Zagreb Open	Zagreb, Croatia
Win	161-50	(Poland) Kamil Rybicki	TF 10-0	February 4, 2026	2026 Grand Prix Zagreb Open	Zagreb, Croatia
Loss	160-50	(Japan) Yoshinosuke Aoyagi	1-6	February 4, 2026	2026 Grand Prix Zagreb Open	Zagreb, Croatia
2026 Yaşar Doğu Tournament (bronze) at 74 kg
Win	160-49	(United States) Yahya Thomas	5-1	January 9, 2026	2026 Yaşar Doğu Tournament	Antalya, Turkey
Loss	159-49	(Iran) Ali Rezaei	4-8	January 9, 2026	2026 Yaşar Doğu Tournament	Antalya, Turkey
Win	159-48	(Kyrgyzstan) Baitemir Tuleberdiev	TF 10-0	January 9, 2026	2026 Yaşar Doğu Tournament	Antalya, Turkey
Win	158-48	(Turkey) O. Gul	Fall	January 9, 2026	2026 Yaşar Doğu Tournament	Antalya, Turkey
Loss	157-48	(Slovakia) Tajmuraz Salkazanov	4-4	October 25, 2025	RAF 02	(United States) State College, Pennsylvania
2025 US World Team Trials DNP at 70 kg
Loss		(United States) Jackson Arrington	FF	May 16–17, 2025	2025 US World Team Trials Challenge	(United States) Louisville, Kentucky
Loss	157-47	(United States) Caleb Henson	5-5	May 16–17, 2025	2025 US World Team Trials Challenge	(United States) Louisville, Kentucky
2025 US Open (silver) at 70 kg
Loss	157-46	(United States) Yianni Diakomihalis	2-8	April 25–26, 2025	2025 US Open National Championships	(United States) Las Vegas, Nevada
Win	157-45	(United States) Will Lewan	9-2	April 25–26, 2025	2025 US Open National Championships	(United States) Las Vegas, Nevada
Win	156-45	(United States) Doug Zapf	TF 10-0	April 25–26, 2025	2025 US Open National Championships	(United States) Las Vegas, Nevada
Win	155-45	(United States) Dayne Morton	TF 10-0	April 25–26, 2025	2025 US Open National Championships	(United States) Las Vegas, Nevada
Win	154-45	(United States) Bryant Avila	TF 10-0	April 25–26, 2025	2025 US Open National Championships	(United States) Las Vegas, Nevada
2025 Muhamet Malo Tournament 4th at 70 kg
Loss	153-45	(United States) Will Lewan	3-4	February 27, 2025	2025 Muhamet Malo Tournament	Tirana, Albania
Loss	153-44	(Japan) Yoshinosuke Aoyagi	1-4	February 27, 2025	2025 Muhamet Malo Tournament	Tirana, Albania
Win	153-43	(North Macedonia) Fati Vejsel	4-0	February 27, 2025	2025 Muhamet Malo Tournament	Tirana, Albania
Win	152-43	(Kazakhstan) Sanzhar Doszhanov	4-2	February 27, 2025	2025 Muhamet Malo Tournament	Tirana, Albania
2025 Zagreb Grand Prix 5th at 70 kg
Loss		(Moldova) Vasile Diacon	FF	February 5, 2025	2025 Zagreb Grand Prix	Zagreb, Croatia
Loss		(Iran) Sina Khalili	FF	February 5, 2025	2025 Zagreb Grand Prix	Zagreb, Croatia
Win	151–43	(United States) Alec Pantaleo	4-3	February 5, 2025	2025 Zagreb Grand Prix	Zagreb, Croatia
2024 World Championships 11th at 70 kg
Loss	150–43	(Georgia (country)) Akaki Kemertelidze	4–10	October 30–31, 2024	2024 World Championships	Tirana, Albania
Win	150–42	(Canada) Peiman Biabani	5–2	October 30–31, 2024	2024 World Championships	Tirana, Albania
2024 US World Team Trials (gold) at 70 kg
Win	149–42	(United States) Alec Pantaleo	2–1	September 14–15, 2024	2024 US World Team Trials	(United States) Lincoln, Nebraska
Win	148–42	(United States) Alec Pantaleo	TF 10–0	September 14–15, 2024	2024 US World Team Trials	(United States) Lincoln, Nebraska
Win	147–42	(United States) Jordan Oliver	6–3	September 14–15, 2024	2024 US World Team Trials	(United States) Lincoln, Nebraska
Win	146–42	(United States) Paniro Johnson	TF 10–0	September 14–15, 2024	2024 US World Team Trials	(United States) Lincoln, Nebraska
Win	145–42	(United States) Jackson Arrington	TF 10–0	September 14–15, 2024	2024 US World Team Trials	(United States) Lincoln, Nebraska
2024 US Olympic Team Trials DNP at 65 kg
Loss		(United States) Nahshon Garrett	FF	April 19, 2024	2024 US Olympic Team Trials	(United States) State College, Pennsylvania
Loss	144–42	(United States) Jesse Mendez	3–6	April 19, 2024	2024 US Olympic Team Trials	(United States) State College, Pennsylvania
2024 Yasar Dogu 5th at 65 kg
Loss	144–41	(Tajikistan) Abdulmazhid Kudiev	Fall	March 7–10, 2024	2024 Yasar Dogu International	Antalya, Turkey
Win	144–40	(Azerbaijan) Murad Hagverdiyev	14–6	March 7–10, 2024	2024 Yasar Dogu International	Antalya, Turkey
Loss	143–40	(Azerbaijan) Musa Aghayev	3–6	March 7–10, 2024	2024 Yasar Dogu International	Antalya, Turkey
Win	143–39	(Bahrain) Alibeg Alibegov	6–2	March 7–10, 2024	2024 Yasar Dogu International	Antalya, Turkey
Win	142–39	(Japan) Makoto Hosokawa	4–1	March 7–10, 2024	2024 Yasar Dogu International	Antalya, Turkey
2022 Yasar Dogu (silver) at 70 kg
Loss	141–39	(Iran) Amir Mohammad Yazdani	2–8	February 27, 2022	2022 Yasar Dogu International	Istanbul, Turkey
Win	141–38	(Russia) Viktor Rassadin	3–2	February 27, 2022	2022 Yasar Dogu International	Istanbul, Turkey
Win	140–38	(Iran) Aliakbar Fazlikhalili	TF 10–0	February 27, 2022	2022 Yasar Dogu International	Istanbul, Turkey
Win	139–38	(Mongolia) Khanburged Gankhuyag	TF 11–0	February 27, 2022	2022 Yasar Dogu International	Istanbul, Turkey
Win	138–38	(Canada) Dillon Williams	TF 10–0	February 12, 2022	2022 Bout at the Ballpark	(United States) Arlington, Texas
2022 Ivan Yarygin Golden Grand Prix DNP at 70 kg
Loss	137–38	(Russia) Kurban Shiraev	8–10	January 28, 2022	Golden Grand Prix Ivan Yarygin 2022	Krasnoyarsk, Russia
2021 World Championships 7th at 70 kg
Loss	137–37	(Azerbaijan) Turan Bayramov	5–6	October 4, 2021	2021 World Championships	Oslo, Norway
Win	137–36	(Germany) Shamil Ustaev	TF 10–0	October 4, 2021	2021 World Championships	Oslo, Norway
Win	136–36	(South Korea) Lee Seung-chul	TF 10–0	October 4, 2021	2021 World Championships	Oslo, Norway
2021 US World Team Trials (gold) at 70 kg
Win	135–36	(United States) Ryan Deakin	4–2	September 12, 2021	2021 US World Team Trials	(United States) Lincoln, Nebraska
Win	134–36	(United States) Ryan Deakin	6–6	September 12, 2021	2021 US World Team Trials	(United States) Lincoln, Nebraska
Win	133–36	(United States) Jordan Oliver	6–4	September 11, 2021	2021 US World Team Trials	(United States) Lincoln, Nebraska
Win	132–36	(United States) Brock Mauller	Fall	September 11, 2021	2021 US World Team Trials	(United States) Lincoln, Nebraska
2021 Poland Open (silver) at 70 kg
Loss	131–36	(United States) Alec Pantaleo	3–5	June 8, 2021	2021 Poland Open	Warsaw, Poland
Win	131–35	(Georgia (country)) Zurabi Iakobishvili	4–0	June 8, 2021	2021 Poland Open	Warsaw, Poland
Win	130–35	(Ukraine) Oleksii Boruta	2–1	June 8, 2021	2021 Poland Open	Warsaw, Poland
Win	129–35	(United States) Alec Pantaleo	8–0	June 8, 2021	2021 Poland Open	Warsaw, Poland
2021 US Open (gold) at 70 kg
Win	128–35	(United States) Alec Pantaleo	7–2	May 1–2, 2021	2021 US Open National Championships	(United States) Coralville, Iowa
Win	127–35	(United States) Brayton Lee	4–2	May 1–2, 2021	2021 US Open National Championships	(United States) Coralville, Iowa
Win	126–35	(United States) Elroy Perkin	TF 12–2	May 1–2, 2021	2021 US Open National Championships	(United States) Coralville, Iowa
Win	125–35	(United States) Cameron Harrell	TF 11–0	May 1–2, 2021	2021 US Open National Championships	(United States) Coralville, Iowa
Win	124–35	(United States) Austin Braun	TF 10–0	May 1–2, 2021	2021 US Open National Championships	(United States) Coralville, Iowa
2020 US Olympic Team Trials DNP at 65 kg
Loss	123–35	(United States) Joey McKenna	TF 1–12	April 2–3, 2021	2020 US Olympic Team Trials	(United States) Fort Worth, Texas
2021 Henri Deglane Grand Prix (silver) at 65 kg
Loss	123–34	(United States) Yianni Diakomihalis	0–5	January 16, 2021	Grand Prix de France Henri Deglane 2021	Nice, France
Win	123–33	(Azerbaijan) Turan Bayramov	2–0	January 16, 2021	Grand Prix de France Henri Deglane 2021	Nice, France
Win	122–33	(Argentina) Agustín Destribats	TF 11–0	January 16, 2021	Grand Prix de France Henri Deglane 2021	Nice, France
Win	121–33	(France) Marwane Yezza	TF 12–1	January 16, 2021	Grand Prix de France Henri Deglane 2021	Nice, France
Win	120–33	(United States) Pat Lugo	3–2	January 9, 2021	FloWrestling: Mensah-Stock vs. Gray	(United States) Austin, Texas
Flo 8-Man Challenge (silver) at 150 lbs
Loss	119–33	(India) Bajrang Punia	4–8	December 18, 2020	Flo 8-Man Challenge: 150 lbs	(United States) Austin, Texas
Win	119–32	(United States) Alec Pantaleo	4–2	December 18, 2020	Flo 8-Man Challenge: 150 lbs	(United States) Austin, Texas
Win	118–32	(United States) Bryce Meredith	TF 10–0	December 18, 2020	Flo 8-Man Challenge: 150 lbs	(United States) Austin, Texas
FloWrestling RTC Cup (silver) for NJRTC at 65 kg
Loss	117–32	(United States) Yianni Diakomihalis	4–4	December 4–5, 2020	FloWrestling RTC Cup	(United States) Austin, Texas
Win	117–31	(United States) Brayton Lee	TF 11–0	December 4–5, 2020	FloWrestling RTC Cup	(United States) Austin, Texas
Loss	116–31	(United States) Yianni Diakomihalis	3–3	December 4–5, 2020	FloWrestling RTC Cup	(United States) Austin, Texas
Win	116–30	(Cuba) Anthony Echemendia	TF 14–4	December 4–5, 2020	FloWrestling RTC Cup	(United States) Austin, Texas
Win	115–30	(United States) Alex Marinelli	5–4	November 1, 2020	HWC Showdown Open	(United States) Iowa City, Iowa
2020 Matteo Pellicone Ranking Series 12th at 74 kg
Loss	114–30	(Iran) Younes Emami	TF 5–15	January 15–18, 2020	Matteo Pellicone Ranking Series 2020	Rome, Italy
2019 Alans International (silver) at 74 kg
Loss	114–29	(Russia) Khetag Tsabolov	4–7	December 7–8, 2019	2019 Alans International	Vladikavkaz, Russia
Win	114–28	(Mongolia) Sumiyabazar Zandanbud	3–0	December 7–8, 2019	2019 Alans International	Vladikavkaz, Russia
Win	113–28	(Russia) Gadzhimurad Alikhmaev	8–4	December 7–8, 2019	2019 Alans International	Vladikavkaz, Russia
Win	112–28	(Turkmenistan) Ali Muhammed Ovezmuradov	TF 11–0	December 7–8, 2019	2019 Alans International	Vladikavkaz, Russia
2019 World Championships 13th at 70 kg
Loss	111–28	(Poland) Magomedmurad Gadzhiev	3–4	September 20, 2019	2019 World Championships	Nur-Sultan, Kazakhstan
Win	111–27	(Canada) Vincent De Marinis	10–2	September 20, 2019	2019 World Championships	Nur-Sultan, Kazakhstan
2019 Aleksandr Medved Prizes 11th at 70 kg
Loss	110–27	(Uzbekistan) Ikhtiyor Navruzov	6–8	August 9–11, 2019	2019 Aleksandr Medved Prizes	Minsk, Belarus
2019 Yaşar Doğu 11th at 70 kg
Loss	110–26	(Turkey) Haydar Yavuz	2–4	July 11–14, 2019	2019 Yaşar Doğu International	Istanbul, Turkey
2019 US World Team Trials (gold) at 70 kg
Win	110–25	(United States) Ryan Deakin	4–3	June 14–15, 2019	Final X: Lincoln	(United States) Lincoln, Nebraska
Win	109-25	(United States) Ryan Deakin	TF 11–0	June 14–15, 2019	Final X: Lincoln	(United States) Lincoln, Nebraska
Win	108–25	(United States) Anthony Ashnault	TF 10–0	May 17–19, 2019	2019 US World Team Trials Challenge	(United States) Raleigh, North Carolina
Win	107–25	(United States) Brandon Sorensen	TF 10–0	May 17–19, 2019	2019 US World Team Trials Challenge	(United States) Raleigh, North Carolina
Win	106–25	(United States) Mario Mason	5–3	May 17–19, 2019	2019 US World Team Trials Challenge	(United States) Raleigh, North Carolina
Win	105–25	(United States) Anthony Ashnault	8–4	May 6, 2019	2019 Beat The Streets: Grapple at the Garden	(United States) New York City, New York
2019 US Open (silver) at 70 kg
Loss	104–25	(United States) Ryan Deakin	6–8	April 24–27, 2019	2019 US Open National Championships	(United States) Las Vegas, Nevada
Win	104–24	(United States) Jason Nolf	6–6	April 24–27, 2019	2019 US Open National Championships	(United States) Las Vegas, Nevada
Win	103–24	(United States) Anthony Collica	9–2	April 24–27, 2019	2019 US Open National Championships	(United States) Las Vegas, Nevada
Win	102–24	(United States) Jeren Glosser	7–0	April 24–27, 2019	2019 US Open National Championships	(United States) Las Vegas, Nevada
Win	101–24	(United States) Wyatt Sheets	TF 10–0	April 24–27, 2019	2019 US Open National Championships	(United States) Las Vegas, Nevada
Win	100–24	(United States) Kyle Kintz	TF 10–0	April 24–27, 2019	2019 US Open National Championships	(United States) Las Vegas, Nevada
2019 Dan Kolov - Nikola Petrov International (bronze) at 70 kg
Win	99–24	(Tunisia) Haithem Dakhlaoui	TF 12–2	February 28 – March 3, 2019	2019 Dan Kolov - Nikola Petrov International	Ruse, Bulgaria
Loss	98–24	(Russia) Anzor Zakuev	3–4	February 28 – March 3, 2019	2019 Dan Kolov - Nikola Petrov International	Ruse, Bulgaria
Win	98–23	(Romania) Evghenii Volcov	TF 10–0	February 28 – March 3, 2019	2019 Dan Kolov - Nikola Petrov International	Ruse, Bulgaria
2019 Ivan Yarygin Golden Grand Prix 7th at 70 kg
Loss	97–23	(Russia) David Baev	2–10	January 26, 2019	Golden Grand Prix Ivan Yarygin 2019	Krasnoyarsk, Russia
Win	97–22	(Turkmenistan) Perman Hommadov	TF 13–0	January 26, 2019	Golden Grand Prix Ivan Yarygin 2019	Krasnoyarsk, Russia
2018 Alans International (bronze) at 70 kg
Win	96–22	(Hungary) Alibek Akbaev	5–3	December 7–9, 2018	2018 Alans International	Vladikavkaz, Russia
Loss	95–22	(Russia) David Baev	6–8	December 7–9, 2018	2018 Alans International	Vladikavkaz, Russia
Win	95–21	(Russia) Chermen Valiev	3–3	December 7–9, 2018	2018 Alans International	Vladikavkaz, Russia
Win	94–21	(Russia) Saipulla Alibolatov	5–4	December 7–9, 2018	2018 Alans International	Vladikavkaz, Russia
2018 World Championships 13th at 70 kg
Loss	93–21	(Mongolia) Bat-Erdeniin Byambadorj	2–4	October 22, 2018	2018 World Championships	Budapest, Hungary
Win	93–20	(Azerbaijan) Khadzhimurad Gadzhiyev	6–5	October 22, 2018	2018 World Championships	Budapest, Hungary
2018 US World Team Trials (gold) at 70 kg
Win	92–20	(United States) Jason Chamberlain	2–1	June 8–9, 2018	2018 Final X: Lincoln	(United States) Lincoln, Nebraska
Win	91–20	(United States) Jason Chamberlain	2–0	June 8–9, 2018	2018 Final X: Lincoln	(United States) Lincoln, Nebraska
Win	90–20	(Cuba) Franklin Maren	2–1	May 17, 2018	2018 Beat The Streets: Team USA vs. The World All-Stars	(United States) New York City, New York
2018 Pan American Championships (gold) at 70 kg
Win	89–20	(Colombia) Hernán Guzmán Ipuz	TF 10–0	May 3–6, 2018	2018 Pan American Continental Championships	Lima, Peru
Win	88–20	(Brazil) Marcos de Oliveira	Fall	May 3–6, 2018	2018 Pan American Continental Championships	Lima, Peru
Win	87–20	(Colombia) Hernán Guzmán Ipuz	TF 11–1	May 3–6, 2018	2018 Pan American Continental Championships	Lima, Peru
Win	86–20	(Venezuela) Anthony Montero	4–1	May 3–6, 2018	2018 Pan American Continental Championships	Lima, Peru
2018 World Cup (gold) for Team USA at 70 kg
Loss	85–20	(Azerbaijan) Joshgun Azimov	4–4	April 7–8, 2018	2018 World Cup	(United States) Iowa City, Iowa
Win	85–19	(Georgia (country)) Levan Kelekhsashvili	8–0	April 7–8, 2018	2018 World Cup	(United States) Iowa City, Iowa
Win	84–19	(Japan) Kirin Kinoshita	8–5	April 7–8, 2018	2018 World Cup	(United States) Iowa City, Iowa
Win	83–19	(India) Arun Kumar	TF 10–0	April 7–8, 2018	2018 World Cup	(United States) Iowa City, Iowa
2017 World Championships (silver) at 70 kg
Loss	82–19	(Italy) Frank Chamizo	0–8	August 20–25, 2017	2017 World Championships	Paris, France
Win	82–18	(Japan) Yuhi Fujinami	5–3	August 20–25, 2017	2017 World Championships	Paris, France
Win	81–18	(Georgia (country)) Zurabi Erbotsonashvili	3–2	August 20–25, 2017	2017 World Championships	Paris, France
Win	80–18	(Colombia) Néstor Tafur	8–0	August 20–25, 2017	2017 World Championships	Paris, France
2017 Spain Grand Prix (gold) at 70 kg
Win	79–18	(Hungary) Zsombor Gulyas	TF 11–0	July 15–16, 2017	2017 Grand Prix of Spain	Madrid, Spain
Win	78–18	(Belarus) Azamat Nurykau	6–0	July 15–16, 2017	2017 Grand Prix of Spain	Madrid, Spain
Win	77–18	(Estonia) Andruse Aimar	TF 12–2	July 15–16, 2017	2017 Grand Prix of Spain	Madrid, Spain
2017 US World Team Trials (gold) at 70 kg
Win	76–18	(United States) Jimmy Kennedy	8–5	June 9–10, 2017	2017 US World Team Trials	(United States) Lincoln, Nebraska
Win	75–18	(United States) Jimmy Kennedy	6–0	June 9–10, 2017	2017 US World Team Trials	(United States) Lincoln, Nebraska
2017 Pan American Championships (gold) at 70 kg
Win	74–18	(El Salvador) Luis Portillo Mejia	TF 10–0	May 5–7, 2017	2017 Pan American Continental Championships	Salvador da Bahia, Brazil
Win	73–18	(Brazil) Lincoln Moreira dos Santos	TF 10–0	May 5–7, 2017	2017 Pan American Continental Championships	Salvador da Bahia, Brazil
Win	72–18	(Dominican Republic) Julio Rodriguez Romero	TF 10–0	May 5–7, 2017	2017 Pan American Continental Championships	Salvador da Bahia, Brazil
Win	71–18	(Ecuador) Mauricio Sánchez Saltos	TF 10–0	May 5–7, 2017	2017 Pan American Continental Championships	Salvador da Bahia, Brazil
2017 US Open (gold) at 70 kg
Win	70–18	(United States) Nazar Kulchytskyy	4–1	April 26–29, 2017	2017 US Open National Championships	(United States) Las Vegas, Nevada
Win	69–18	(United States) Jason Nolf	9–8	April 26–29, 2017	2017 US Open National Championships	(United States) Las Vegas, Nevada
Win	68–18	(United States) Dylan Ness	TF 11–0	April 26–29, 2017	2017 US Open National Championships	(United States) Las Vegas, Nevada
Win	67–18	(United States) Jake Sueflohn	TF 10–0	April 26–29, 2017	2017 US Open National Championships	(United States) Las Vegas, Nevada
Win	66–18	(United States) Grant LaMont	TF 10–0	April 26–29, 2017	2017 US Open National Championships	(United States) Las Vegas, Nevada
2017 Ukrainian Memorial (gold) at 70 kg
Win	65–18	(Iran) Hamed Rashidi	Fall	March 3–4, 2017	XXI Outstanding Ukrainian Wrestlers and Coaches Memorial	Kyiv, Ukraine
Win	64–18	(Belarus) Azamat Nurykau	5–3	March 3–4, 2017	XXI Outstanding Ukrainian Wrestlers and Coaches Memorial	Kyiv, Ukraine
Win	63–18	(Belarus) Surho Rashytkhanau	7–6	March 3–4, 2017	XXI Outstanding Ukrainian Wrestlers and Coaches Memorial	Kyiv, Ukraine
2017 World Cup (silver) for Team USA at 70 kg
Loss	62–18	(Iran) Mostafa Hosseinkhani	0–2	February 16–17, 2017	2017 World Cup	Kermanshah, Iran
Win	62–17	(Azerbaijan) David Suynyuchkhanov	TF 10–0	February 16–17, 2017	2017 World Cup	Kermanshah, Iran
Win	61–17	(Russia) Magomedkhabib Kadimagomedov	8–6	February 16–17, 2017	2017 World Cup	Kermanshah, Iran
Win	60–17	(Georgia (country)) Levan Kelekhsashvili	TF 10–0	February 16–17, 2017	2017 World Cup	Kermanshah, Iran
2016 World Championships 7th at 70 kg
Loss	59–17	(Uzbekistan) Rashid Kurbanov	3–3	December 11, 2016	2016 World Championships	Budapest, Hungary
Win	59–16	(Georgia (country)) Davit Tlashadze	4–1	December 11, 2016	2016 World Championships	Budapest, Hungary
Win	58–16	(Azerbaijan) Gitinomagomed Gadzhiyev	TF 12–1	December 11, 2016	2016 World Championships	Budapest, Hungary
2016 US World Team Trials (gold) at 70 kg
Win	57–16	(United States) Jordan Oliver	4–3	November 10–12, 2016	2016 Bill Farrell Memorial International (US World Team Trials)	(United States) New York City, New York
Win	56–16	(United States) Jordan Oliver	2–1	November 10–12, 2016	2016 Bill Farrell Memorial International (US World Team Trials)	(United States) New York City, New York
2016 Spain Grand Prix (gold) at 70 kg
Win	55–16	(Russia) Ildus Giniyatullin	4–3	July 9–10, 2016	2016 Grand Prix of Spain	Madrid, Spain
Win	54–16	(Uzbekistan) Hamed Vafaei	TF 10–0	July 9–10, 2016	2016 Grand Prix of Spain	Madrid, Spain
Win	53–16	(Germany) Kubilay Cakici	7–5	July 9–10, 2016	2016 Grand Prix of Spain	Madrid, Spain
2016 Poland Open (bronze) at 70 kg
Win	52–16	(Kazakhstan) Dauren Zhumagaziyev	10–4	June 17–19, 2016	2016 Poland Open	Spala, Poland
Loss	51–16	(Uzbekistan) Ikhtiyor Navruzov	8–10	June 17–19, 2016	2016 Poland Open	Spala, Poland
Win	51–15	(Turkey) Zafer Dama	3–0	June 17–19, 2016	2016 Poland Open	Spala, Poland
2016 World Cup 4th for Team USA at 70 kg
Win	50–15	(Georgia (country)) Davit Tlashadze	TF 10–0	June 11–12, 2016	2016 World Cup	(United States) Los Angeles, California
Win	49–15	(Iran) Mostafa Hosseinkhani	5–2	June 11–12, 2016	2016 World Cup	(United States) Los Angeles, California
Win	48–15	(Azerbaijan) Omarov Gadzhimurad	TF 10–0	June 11–12, 2016	2016 World Cup	(United States) Los Angeles, California
Win	47–15	(India) Vinod Kumar Omprakash	TF 10–0	June 11–12, 2016	2016 World Cup	(United States) Los Angeles, California
2016 US Olympic Team Trials DNP at 65 kg
Loss	46–15	(United States) Bernard Futrell	4–8	April 9, 2016	2016 US Olympic Team Trials	(United States) Iowa City, Iowa
Loss	46–14	(United States) Zain Retherford	2–9	April 9, 2016	2016 US Olympic Team Trials	(United States) Iowa City, Iowa
2016 Pan American Championships (silver) at 65 kg
Loss	46–13	(Venezuela) Anthony Montero	6–10	February 26–28, 2016	2016 Pan American Continental Championships	(United States) Frisco, Texas
Win	46–12	(Mexico) Brandon Díaz	3–2	February 26–28, 2016	2016 Pan American Continental Championships	(United States) Frisco, Texas
Win	45–12	(Canada) Dillon Williams	TF 14–1	February 26–28, 2016	2016 Pan American Continental Championships	(United States) Frisco, Texas
2016 Yaşar Doğu 17th at 65 kg
Loss	44–12	(Turkey) Safa Aksoy	2–2	February 5–7, 2016	2016 Yaşar Doğu International	Istanbul, Turkey
2015 World Championships (bronze) at 70 kg
Win	44–11	(Bulgaria) Miroslav Kirov	Fall	September 12, 2015	2015 World Championships	(United States) Las Vegas, Nevada
Loss	43–11	(Iran) Hassan Yazdani	4–9	September 12, 2015	2015 World Championships	(United States) Las Vegas, Nevada
Win	43–10	(India) Kamar Arun	TF 10–0	September 12, 2015	2015 World Championships	(United States) Las Vegas, Nevada
Win	42–10	(Slovakia) Robert Olle	TF 12–1	September 12, 2015	2015 World Championships	(United States) Las Vegas, Nevada
Win	41–10	(Costa Rica) Johnathan Scott Duque	TF 10–0	September 12, 2015	2015 World Championships	(United States) Las Vegas, Nevada
2015 US World Team Trials (gold) at 70 kg
Win	40–10	(United States) Nick Marable	2–1	July 25, 2015	2015 US World Team Special Wrestle-off	(United States) Fargo, North Dakota
Win	39–10	(United States) Nick Marable	4–0	July 25, 2015	2015 US World Team Special Wrestle-off	(United States) Fargo, North Dakota
2015 Spain Grand Prix (gold) at 70 kg
Win	38–10	(Italy) Frank Chamizo	5–5	July 11, 2015	2015 Grand Prix of Spain	Madrid, Spain
Win	37–10	(Japan) Takojima Nobuyoshi	7–0	July 11, 2015	2015 Grand Prix of Spain	Madrid, Spain
Win	36–10	(Canada) Alec Bauer	TF 10–0	July 11, 2015	2015 Grand Prix of Spain	Madrid, Spain
Win	35–10	(United States) Dustin Schlatter	4–2	June 12–14, 2015	2015 US World Team Trials	(United States) Madison, Wisconsin
Win	34–10	(United States) Dustin Schlatter	5–0	June 12–14, 2015	2015 US World Team Trials	(United States) Madison, Wisconsin
Win	33–10	(United States) Kevin LeValley	TF 13–2	June 12–14, 2015	2015 US World Team Trials	(United States) Madison, Wisconsin
Win	32–10	(United States) Nazar Kulchytskyy	9–7	June 12–14, 2015	2015 US World Team Trials	(United States) Madison, Wisconsin
2015 US Nationals (bronze) at 70 kg
Win	31–10	(United States) Kevin LeValley	TF 13–0	May 7–9, 2015	2015 US National Championships	(United States) Las Vegas, Nevada
Win	30–10	(United States) Moza Fay	TF 15–4	May 7–9, 2015	2015 US National Championships	(United States) Las Vegas, Nevada
Win	29–10	(United States) Adam Hall	TF 10–0	May 7–9, 2015	2015 US National Championships	(United States) Las Vegas, Nevada
Win	28–10	(United States) Mike Moreno	TF 11–0	May 7–9, 2015	2015 US National Championships	(United States) Las Vegas, Nevada
Loss	27–10	(United States) Kevin LeValley	5–5	May 7–9, 2015	2015 US National Championships	(United States) Las Vegas, Nevada
Win	27–9	(United States) Chase Nelson	TF 13–2	May 7–9, 2015	2015 US National Championships	(United States) Las Vegas, Nevada
Win	26–9	(United States) Connor Keating	TF 12–2	May 7–9, 2015	2015 US National Championships	(United States) Las Vegas, Nevada
2014 US World Team Trials (silver) at 70 kg
Loss	25–9	(United States) Nick Marable	2-8	July 18–24, 2014	2013 US World Team Trials Phase II	(United States) Fargo, North Dakota
Loss	25–8	(United States) Nick Marable	1–2	July 18–24, 2014	2013 US World Team Trials Phase II	(United States) Fargo, North Dakota
Win	25–7	(United States) Kyle Ruschell	8–4	July 18–24, 2014	2013 US World Team Trials Phase II	(United States) Fargo, North Dakota
Win	24–7	(United States) Moza Fay	5–4	July 18–24, 2014	2013 US World Team Trials Phase II	(United States) Fargo, North Dakota
Win	23–7	(United States) Chase Pami	4–1	July 18–24, 2014	2013 US World Team Trials Phase II	(United States) Fargo, North Dakota
2014 University World Championships (silver) at 70 kg
Loss	22–7	(Moldova) Evgheni Nedealco	Fall	July 8–12, 2014	2014 University World Championships	Pécs, Hungary
Win	22–6	(Russia) Shamil Magomedov	8–4	July 8–12, 2014	2014 University World Championships	Pécs, Hungary
Win	21–6	(Finland) Jere Kunnas	11–5	July 8–12, 2014	2014 University World Championships	Pécs, Hungary
2014 US University Nationals (gold) at 70 kg
Win	20–6	(United States) Adam Hall	4–2	May 22–25, 2014	2014 US University National Championships	(United States) Akron, Ohio
Win	19–6	(United States) Adam Hall	4–1	May 22–25, 2014	2014 US University National Championships	(United States) Akron, Ohio
Win	18–6	(United States) Steve Santos	TF 11–0	May 22–25, 2014	2014 US University National Championships	(United States) Akron, Ohio
Win	17–6	(United States) Josh Demas	TF 11–0	May 22–25, 2014	2014 US University National Championships	(United States) Akron, Ohio
Win	16–6	(United States) Chad Walsh	TF 11–1	May 22–25, 2014	2014 US University National Championships	(United States) Akron, Ohio
Win	15–6	(United States) Luke Blanton	TF 12–0	May 22–25, 2014	2014 US University National Championships	(United States) Akron, Ohio
Win	14–6	(United States) Brandon Nelsen	TF 12–2	May 22–25, 2014	2014 US University National Championships	(United States) Akron, Ohio
Win	13–6	(United States) Howell Clements	Fall	May 22–25, 2014	2014 US University National Championships	(United States) Akron, Ohio
2014 US Open 5th at 70 kg
Loss	12–6	(United States) Kyle Ruschell	5–8	April 17–19, 2014	2014 US Open National Championships	(United States) Las Vegas, Nevada
Loss	12–5	(United States) Nick Marable	1–5	April 17–19, 2014	2014 US Open National Championships	(United States) Las Vegas, Nevada
Win	12–4	(United States) Jason Welch	10–10	April 17–19, 2014	2014 US Open National Championships	(United States) Las Vegas, Nevada
Win	11–4	(United States) Chase Nelson	9–8	April 17–19, 2014	2014 US Open National Championships	(United States) Las Vegas, Nevada
Win	10–4	(United States) Devon Parrish	TF 10–0	April 17–19, 2014	2014 US Open National Championships	(United States) Las Vegas, Nevada
2013 Universiade Games 12th at 66 kg
Loss	9–4	(Kyrgyzstan) Ulukman Mamatov	1–3	July 11, 2013	2013 Summer Universiade	Kazan, Russia
Win	9–3	(Finland) Petteri Martikainen	4–0	July 11, 2013	2013 Summer Universiade	Kazan, Russia
2013 US World Team Trials DNP at 66 kg
Loss	8–3	(United States) Jason Chamberlain	4–8	June 21, 2013	2013 US World Team Trials Challenge	(United States) Stillwater, Oklahoma
Loss	8–2	(United States) Drew Headlee	Fall	June 21, 2013	2013 US World Team Trials Challenge	(United States) Stillwater, Oklahoma
2013 US University Nationals (gold) at 66 kg
Win	8–1	(United States) Jason Chamberlain	3–0	May 24–26, 2013	2013 US University National Championships	(United States) Akron, Ohio
Loss	7–1	(United States) Jason Chamberlain	4–5	May 24–26, 2013	2013 US University National Championships	(United States) Akron, Ohio
Win	7–0	(United States) Jason Chamberlain	4–2	May 24–26, 2013	2013 US University National Championships	(United States) Akron, Ohio
Win	6–0	(United States) Hunter Stieber	Fall	May 24–26, 2013	2013 US University National Championships	(United States) Akron, Ohio
Win	5–0	(United States) Nick Dardanes	TF 13–2	May 24–26, 2013	2013 US University National Championships	(United States) Akron, Ohio
Win	4–0	(United States) Zack Beitz	TF 12–2	May 24–26, 2013	2013 US University National Championships	(United States) Akron, Ohio
Win	3–0	(United States) Tyler Scotten	TF 10–0	May 24–26, 2013	2013 US University National Championships	(United States) Akron, Ohio
Win	2–0	(United States) Daniel White	TF 10–0	May 24–26, 2013	2013 US University National Championships	(United States) Akron, Ohio
Win	1–0	(United States) Zachary Stepan	TF 10–0	May 24–26, 2013	2013 US University National Championships	(United States) Akron, Ohio

== NCAA record ==
NCAA Championships Matches
Res.	Record	Opponent	Score	Date	Event
2015 NCAA Championships (bronze) at 157 lbs
Win	18–6	Nick Brascetta	3–2	March 19–21, 2015	2015 NCAA Division I National Championships
Win	17–6	Ian Miller	MD 13–4	March 19–21, 2015	2015 NCAA Division I National Championships
Loss	16–6	Isaiah Martinez	2–3	March 19–21, 2015	2015 NCAA Division I National Championships
Win	16–5	Mitchell Minott	MD 12–4	March 19–21, 2015	2015 NCAA Division I National Championships
Win	15–5	Noel Blanco	TF 20–5	March 19–21, 2015	2015 NCAA Division I National Championships
Win	14–5	Markus Scheidel	MD 14–3	March 19–21, 2015	2015 NCAA Division I National Championships
2014 NCAA Championships (bronze) at 157 lbs
Win	13–5	Brian Realbuto	MFF	March 20–22, 2014	2014 NCAA Division I National Championships
Win	12–5	Isaac Jordan	TF 15–0	March 20–22, 2014	2014 NCAA Division I National Championships
Win	11–5	Joey Lavallee	MD 12–2	March 20–22, 2014	2014 NCAA Division I National Championships
Loss	10–5	Dylan Ness	Fall	March 20–22, 2014	2014 NCAA Division I National Championships
Win	10–4	Zach Brunson	MD 14–3	March 20–22, 2014	2014 NCAA Division I National Championships
Win	9–4	Josh Kreimier	MD 14–3	March 20–22, 2014	2014 NCAA Division I National Championships
2013 NCAA Championships 7th at 157 lbs
Win	8–4	James Fleming	MD 14–4	March 21–23, 2013	2013 NCAA Division I National Championships
Loss	7–4	Jedd Moore	Fall	March 21–23, 2013	2013 NCAA Division I National Championships
Win	7–3	Dylan Alton	MD 14–4	March 21–23, 2013	2013 NCAA Division I National Championships
Win	6–3	Taylor Walsh	MD 19–8	March 21–23, 2013	2013 NCAA Division I National Championships
Win	5–3	Bobby Barnhisel	TF 21–6	March 21–23, 2013	2013 NCAA Division I National Championships
Loss	4–3	Kyle Bradley	TB 5–6	March 21–23, 2013	2013 NCAA Division I National Championships
2012 NCAA Championships 7th at 157 lbs
Win	4–2	Walter Peppelman	9–1	March 15–17, 2012	2012 NCAA Division I National Championships
Loss	3–2	Dylan Alton	3–4	March 15–17, 2012	2012 NCAA Division I National Championships
Win	3–1	Steve Monk	3–1	March 15–17, 2012	2012 NCAA Division I National Championships
Loss	2–1	Jason Welch	1–2	March 15–17, 2012	2012 NCAA Division I National Championships
Win	2–0	James Fleming	OT 8–3	March 15–17, 2012	2012 NCAA Division I National Championships
Win	1–0	Brian Tanen	MD 16–7	March 15–17, 2012	2012 NCAA Division I National Championships

=== Stats ===
Season	Year	School	Placement	Weigh Class	Record	Win
2015	Senior	University of Nebraska	3rd	157	30–5	85.71%
2014	Junior	University of Nebraska	3rd	157	35–2	94.60%
2013	Sophomore	University of Nebraska	7th	157	25–6	89.65%
2012	Freshman	University of Nebraska	7th	157	34–5	87.18%
Career					124–18	92.12%
