= 2016 World Wrestling Championships – Men's freestyle 70 kg =

Men's freestyle 70 kg at the 2016 World Championships
- Venue: SYMA Sports and Conference Centre
- Dates: 11 December 2016
- Competitors: 28 from 28 nations

Medalists
gold medal	Magomed Kurbanaliev	Russia
silver medal	Nurlan Bekzhanov	Kazakhstan
bronze medal	Elaman Dogdurbek Uulu	Kyrgyzstan
bronze medal	Mostafa Hosseinkhani	Iran

The men's freestyle 70 kilograms is a competition featured at the 2016 World Wrestling Championships, and was held in Budapest, Hungary on 11 December.

== Results ==
Legend

- F — Won by fall
- R — Retired

=== Final ===
Final
Nurlan Bekzhanov (KAZ)	4
Magomed Kurbanaliev (RUS)	8

=== Top half ===
Round of 32
Nicolae Cojocaru (ROU)	2
Johnny Bur (FRA)	6
Mihail Sava (MDA)	7
Kubilay Cakici (GER)	2
Nurlan Bekzhanov (KAZ)	5
Elaman Dogdurbek Uulu (KGZ)	1
Zsombor Gulyás (HUN)	3
Semen Radulov (UKR)	2

Round of 16
Michal Radnóti (SVK)	19
Jarvis Tarkong (PLW)	9
Nobuyoshi Takojima (JPN)	10
Mateusz Pisarski (POL)	0
Johnny Bur (FRA)	1
Mihail Sava (MDA)	6
Nurlan Bekzhanov (KAZ)	6
Zsombor Gulyás (HUN)	2

Quarterfinals
Michal Radnóti (SVK)	0
Nobuyoshi Takojima (JPN)	10
Mihail Sava (MDA)	0
Nurlan Bekzhanov (KAZ)	7

Semifinals
Nobuyoshi Takojima (JPN)	6
Nurlan Bekzhanov (KAZ)	10

=== Bottom half ===
Round of 32
Magomed Kurbanaliev (RUS)	12
Aimar Andruse (EST)	0
Grigor Grigoryan (ARM)	1
Miroslav Kirov (BUL)	2
Mostafa Hosseinkhani (IRI)	9
Amit Kumar Dhankar (IND)	0^{R}
Azamat Nurykau (BLR)	2
Yakup Gör (TUR)	2
Rashid Kurbanov (UZB)	11
Menghejigan (CHN)	1
Gamid Dzhalilov (TJK)	3
Buyanjavyn Batzorig (MGL)	7
Gitinomagomed Gadzhiyev (AZE)	1
James Green (USA)	12
Davit Tlashadze (GEO)	8
Kyle Horvath (CAN)	0

Round of 16
Magomed Kurbanaliev (RUS)	11
Miroslav Kirov (BUL)	0
Mostafa Hosseinkhani (IRI)	2
Yakup Gör (TUR)	0
Rashid Kurbanov (UZB)	3^{F}
Buyanjavyn Batzorig (MGL)	2
James Green (USA)	4
Davit Tlashadze (GEO)	1

Quarterfinals
Magomed Kurbanaliev (RUS)	8
Mostafa Hosseinkhani (IRI)	0
Rashid Kurbanov (UZB)	3
James Green (USA)	3

Semifinals
Magomed Kurbanaliev (RUS)	4
Rashid Kurbanov (UZB)	1

=== Repechage ===
Repechage round 1
Elaman Dogdurbek Uulu (KGZ)	5
Zsombor Gulyás (HUN)	4
Aimar Andruse (EST)	0
Miroslav Kirov (BUL)	10

Repechage round 2
Elaman Dogdurbek Uulu (KGZ)	8
Mihail Sava (MDA)	2
Miroslav Kirov (BUL)	2
Mostafa Hosseinkhani (IRI)	4

Bronze medals
Elaman Dogdurbek Uulu (KGZ)	11
Nobuyoshi Takojima (JPN)	0
Mostafa Hosseinkhani (IRI)	1
Rashid Kurbanov (UZB)	1
