= Nazar Kulchytskyy =

American-Ukrainian retired wrestler

Personal information
- Full name: Nazari Kulchytskyy
- Nationality: Ukrainian; American
- Born: June 3, 1992 (age 34) Sosnivka, Ukraine
- Weight: 74 kg (163 lb)

Sport
- Sport: Wrestling
- Events: Freestyle; Folkstyle
- College team: Wisconsin–Oshkosh Titans
- Club: Team Nazar Training Center; Titan Mercury WC; Minnesota Storm WC (MN RTC)
- Coached by: Royce Alger; Efrain Ayala
Medal record
Men's freestyle wrestling
Representing the United States
World Clubs Cup
Gold medal – first place	2016 Kharkiv	Team
Silver medal – second place	2017 Tehran	Team
Pan American Championships
Silver medal – second place	2018 Lima	74 kg
US Open Championships
Silver medal – second place	2017 Las Vegas	70 kg
Representing Ukraine
Cadet European Championships
Bronze medal – third place	2008 Daugavpils	54 kg
Collegiate Wrestling
Representing UW Oshkosh Titans
NCAA Division III Championships
Gold medal – first place	2012 La Crosse	157 lb
Gold medal – first place	2013 Cedar Rapids	165 lb
Gold medal – first place	2014 Cedar Rapids	157 lb

Nazar Kulchytskyy (Ukrainian: Назар Кульчицький, romanized: Nazar Kulchytski; born June 3, 1992) is a Ukrainian-American retired freestyle and folkstyle wrestler, who currently coaches at Team Nazar Training Center. In Ukraine, he was a five-time age-group National champion and a European age-group medalist. Since arriving to the United States, he captured Pan American runner-up honors, three Dave Schultz Memorial medals and a Cerro Pelado International gold medal. As a collegiate wrestler, Kulchytskyy was a three-time NCAA Division III champion out of the University of Wisconsin–Oshkosh.

== Early life ==
Kulchytzkyy was born in Sosnivka, Ukraine. He started training in freestyle when he was seven years old and always had to wrestle older kids as those were the tournaments he qualified for. When he was twelve years old, he moved to Odesa with his coach to attend school and follow a strict training program. Since then, he had tremendous success in the Ukrainian circuit, with five National titles as a cadet and a bronze medal at the Cadet European Championships of 2008, same year in which he and other members of his family were granted the green card visa they had been looking for, for years, to immigrate to the United States.

== University ==
After his senior year of high school, in which he did not compete as he was considered a professional due to his accomplishments, Kulchytzkyy attended a Division III college in University of Wisconsin–Oshkosh.

He's the most accomplished wrestler in the history of the Titans, having won three Division III National titles and earning NCAA Division III Wrestler of the Year honors twice. Despite his initial wish of transferring to a Division I university, he refused to transfer as a junior and graduated with a 143–5 record, with only one loss to a DIII athlete.

== Freestyle ==
=== Youth ===
Won a bronze medal for Ukraine at the Cadet European Championships and was a multiple time National champion there. He also won a FILA USA National championship as a junior, where he defeated future three-time NCAA DI champion Alex Dieringer.

=== Senior ===
In 2014, Kulchytskyy was granted a US citizenship and was able to compete at the 15' US World Team Trials Challenge tournament after winning the Northeastern Regionals. He went 2–2 at the tournament and did not qualify for the best-of-three. In 2017, he won a Cerro Pelado International gold medal and became the US Open runner-up, qualifying for the 17' US World Team Trials. At the trials, he lost to Jim Kennedy in the finals and then to Jason Nolf in the true-third match.

At the 16' and 17' Dave Schultz Memorial International, Kulchytskyy recorded bronze medals. In November 2017, he became runner-up of the Henri Deglane Challenge and helped Team USA reach the same honors as a team at the Clubs World Cup, where he had already competed last year and had reached first place with the Team. Since then, he has won a silver medal at the 18' Pan American Championships and bronze medals at the 19' Bill Farrell Memorial and the 20' Granma and Cerro Pelado.

On June 28, 2020, Kulchytskyy competed at Rumble on the Rooftop. He won his match by technical fall and subsequently retired from the sport to focus on coaching.

He holds notable victories over:

NCAA DI champions: Mekhi Lewis, Jayson Ness (twice), Derek St. John.

NCAA DI All-Americans: Dylan Ness (four-time, two-time finalist - twice), Tyler Berger (three-time, finalist), Alec Pantaleo (three-time - twice), Evan Wick (three-time), Dan Vallimont (two-time, finalist), Dave Habat (two-time, finalist - twice), Chad Walsh (two-time), Chase Pami (two-time), Hunter Stieber (two-time), Ganbayar Sanjaa (two-time), Kevin LeValley (two-time), Adam Hall (two-time), Joey Lavalle (one-time, finalist) Rick Durso, Nick Dardanes (twice), Max Thomsen, Thomas Gantt (thrice), Michael DePalma, Anthony Collica.

== Coaching career ==
In July 2020, Kulchytskyy opened up a wrestling facility in Stoughton, Wisconsin, called Team Nazar Training Center.

== Freestyle record ==
Senior Freestyle Matches
Res.	Record	Opponent	Score	Date	Event	Location
Win	70-29	(United States) Danny Braunagel	TF 10-0	June 28, 2020	2020 Rumble on the Rooftop	(United States) Chicago, Illinois
2020 Granma y Cerro Pelado (bronze) at 74 kg
Win	69-29	(United States) Dan Vallimont	5-0	February 9–17, 2020	2020 Granma y Cerro Pelado	Havana, Cuba
Loss	68-29	(Cuba) Franklin Marén	2-3	February 9–17, 2020	2020 Granma y Cerro Pelado	Havana, Cuba
Win	68-28	(Cuba) Jorge Despaigne	6-0	February 9–17, 2020	2020 Granma y Cerro Pelado	Havana, Cuba
2019 US Nationals 6th at 74kg
Loss	67-28	(United States) Anthony Valencia	TF 1-11	December 20–22, 2019	2019 Senior Nationals - US Olympic Trials Qualifier	(United States) Fort Worth, Texas
Loss	67-27	(United States) Evan Wick	2-4	December 20–22, 2019	2019 Senior Nationals - US Olympic Trials Qualifier	(United States) Fort Worth, Texas
Loss	67-26	(United States) Logan Massa	6-15	December 20–22, 2019	2019 Senior Nationals - US Olympic Trials Qualifier	(United States) Fort Worth, Texas
Win	67-25	(United States) Alec Pantaleo	TF 14-3	December 20–22, 2019	2019 Senior Nationals - US Olympic Trials Qualifier	(United States) Fort Worth, Texas
Win	66-25	(United States) Joey Lavallee	3-2	December 20–22, 2019	2019 Senior Nationals - US Olympic Trials Qualifier	(United States) Fort Worth, Texas
Win	65-25	(United States) Chad Walsh	TF 11-0	December 20–22, 2019	2019 Senior Nationals - US Olympic Trials Qualifier	(United States) Fort Worth, Texas
Win	64-25	(United States) Jake Keating	TF 10-0	December 20–22, 2019	2019 Senior Nationals - US Olympic Trials Qualifier	(United States) Fort Worth, Texas
2019 Bill Farrell Memorial (bronze) at 74kg
Win	63-25	(United States) Mekhi Lewis	9-3	November 15–16, 2019	2019 Bill Farrell Memorial International Open	(United States) New York City, New York
Win	62-25	(United States) Tyler Berger	6-2	November 15–16, 2019	2019 Bill Farrell Memorial International Open	(United States) New York City, New York
Loss	61-25	(United States) Isaiah Martinez	5-12	November 15–16, 2019	2019 Bill Farrell Memorial International Open	(United States) New York City, New York
Win	61-24	(United States) Dylan Ness	6-1	November 15–16, 2019	2019 Bill Farrell Memorial International Open	(United States) New York City, New York
Win	60-24	(United States) Rob Mathers	Fall	November 15–16, 2019	2019 Bill Farrell Memorial International Open	(United States) New York City, New York
2019 US World Team Trials at 70 kg
Loss	59-24	(United States) Mario Mason	1-5	May 17–19, 2019	2019 US World Team Trials Challenge Tournament	(United States) Raleigh, North Carolina
Loss	59-23	(United States) Brandon Sorensen	1-5	May 17–19, 2019	2019 US World Team Trials Challenge Tournament	(United States) Raleigh, North Carolina
2019 US Open 6th at 70 kg
Win	59-22	(United States) Anthony Collica	TF 10-0	April 24–27, 2019	2019 US Open Championships	(United States) Las Vegas, Nevada
Win	58-22	(United States) Elroy Perkin	12-10	April 24–27, 2019	2019 US Open Championships	(United States) Las Vegas, Nevada
Loss	57-22	(United States) Jason Nolf	TF 2-13	April 24–27, 2019	2019 US Open Championships	(United States) Las Vegas, Nevada
Win	57-21	(United States) Destin McCauley	TF 12-1	April 24–27, 2019	2019 US Open Championships	(United States) Las Vegas, Nevada
Win	56-21	(United States) Renaldo Rodriguez Spencer	6-5	April 24–27, 2019	2019 US Open Championships	(United States) Las Vegas, Nevada
2018 Pan American Championships (silver) at 74kg
Loss	55-21	(Cuba) Liván López	1-6	May 3–6, 2018	2018 Pan American Wrestling Championships	Lima, Peru
Win	55-20	(Chile) Carlos Romero	TF 10-0	May 3–6, 2018	2018 Pan American Wrestling Championships	Lima, Peru
Win	54-20	(Argentina) Jorge Llano	TF 11-0	May 3–6, 2018	2018 Pan American Wrestling Championships	Lima, Peru
2018 US World Team Trials (bronze) at 74 kg
Loss	53-20	(United States) Isaiah Martinez	TF 2-13	May 18–20, 2018	2018 US World Team Trials Challenge	(United States) Rochester, Minnesota
Loss	53-19	(United States) Isaiah Martinez	TF 2-13	May 18–20, 2018	2018 US World Team Trials Challenge	(United States) Rochester, Minnesota
Win	53-18	(United States) Thomas Gantt	5-3	May 18–20, 2018	2018 US World Team Trials Challenge	(United States) Rochester, Minnesota
Win	52-18	(United States) Evan Wick	Fall	May 18–20, 2018	2018 US World Team Trials Challenge	(United States) Rochester, Minnesota
2018 International Ukrainian Tournament 14th at 70 kg
Loss	51-18	(Russia) Konstantin Vlasov	0-3	February 23–25, 2018	2018 Outstanding Ukrainian Wrestlers and Coaches Memorial	Kyiv, Ukraine
Win	51-17	(Russia) Bulat Ataev	6-1	February 23–25, 2018	2018 Outstanding Ukrainian Wrestlers and Coaches Memorial	Kyiv, Ukraine
2017 World Clubs Cup (silver) as TMWC
Win	50-17	(Iran) Hossein Elyasi	5-4	December 7–8, 2017	2017 World Wrestling Clubs Cup	Tehran, Iran
Win	49-17	(Mongolia) Boldkhuu Batsukh	10-2	December 7–8, 2017	2017 World Wrestling Clubs Cup	Tehran, Iran
Win	48-17	Persiyan Mihov	9-2	December 7–8, 2017	2017 World Wrestling Clubs Cup	Tehran, Iran
Win	47-17	(India) Veer Dev Gulia	TF 10-0	December 7–8, 2017	2017 World Wrestling Clubs Cup	Tehran, Iran
Win	46-17	(Canada) Guseyn Ruslanzada	TF 10-0	December 7–8, 2017	2017 World Wrestling Clubs Cup	Tehran, Iran
2017 Henri Deglane Challenge (silver) at 74 kg
Loss	45-17	(France) Johnny Bur	2-4	November 24–25, 2017	2017 Henri Deglane Challenge	Nice, France
Win	45-16	(Italy) Salvatore Diana	TF 10-0	November 24–25, 2017	2017 Henri Deglane Challenge	Nice, France
2017 Dave Schultz M. Invitational (gold) at 74 kg
Win	44-16	(Russia) Rasul Dzhukayev	5-2	November 1–4, 2017	2017 Dave Schultz Memorial Invitational	(United States) Colorado Springs, Colorado
Win	43-16	(United States) Dylan Ness	TF 12-0	November 1–4, 2017	2017 Dave Schultz Memorial Invitational	(United States) Colorado Springs, Colorado
2017 US World Team Trials 4th at 70 kg
Loss	42-16	(United States) Jason Nolf	2-7	June 9–10, 2017	2017 US World Team Trials Challenge Tournament	(United States) Lincoln, Nebraska
Loss	42-15	(United States) Jimmy Kennedy	0-7	June 9–10, 2017	2017 US World Team Trials Challenge Tournament	(United States) Lincoln, Nebraska
Win	42-14	(United States) Chase Pami	4-3	June 9–10, 2017	2017 US World Team Trials Challenge Tournament	(United States) Lincoln, Nebraska
Win	41-14	(United States) Thomas Gantt	10-7	June 9–10, 2017	2017 US World Team Trials Challenge Tournament	(United States) Lincoln, Nebraska
2017 US Open (silver) at 70 kg
Loss	40-14	(United States) James Green	1-4	April 26–29, 2017	2017 US Open Championships	(United States) Las Vegas, Nevada
Win	40-13	(United States) Alec Pantaleo	TF 10-0	April 26–29, 2017	2017 US Open Championships	(United States) Las Vegas, Nevada
Win	39-13	(United States) Hunter Stieber	TF 10-0	April 26–29, 2017	2017 US Open Championships	(United States) Las Vegas, Nevada
Win	38-13	(United States) Tommy Pawelski	TF 10-0	April 26–29, 2017	2017 US Open Championships	(United States) Las Vegas, Nevada
Win	37-13	(United States) Levi Calhoun	TF 10-0	April 26–29, 2017	2017 US Open Championships	(United States) Las Vegas, Nevada
2017 Cerro Pelado International (gold) at 70 kg
Win	36-13	(Cuba) Ernesto Sanchez	TF 11-1	February 17–23, 2017	2017 Cerro Pelado International	Havana, Cuba
Win	35-13	(United States) Michael DePalma	Fall	February 17–23, 2017	2017 Cerro Pelado International	Havana, Cuba
Win	34-13	(Cuba) Serguei Rondón	TF 10-0	February 17–23, 2017	2017 Cerro Pelado International	Havana, Cuba
2017 Dave Schultz M. International (bronze) at 70 kg
Win	33-13	(United States) Michael DePalma	Fall	January 31-February 3, 2017	2017 Dave Schultz Memorial International	(United States) Colorado Springs, Colorado
Win	32-13	(United States) Thomas Gantt	TF 11-0	January 31-February 3, 2017	2017 Dave Schultz Memorial International	(United States) Colorado Springs, Colorado
Loss	31-13	(United States) Jordan Oliver	2-7	January 31-February 3, 2017	2017 Dave Schultz Memorial International	(United States) Colorado Springs, Colorado
Win	31-12	(United States) Robert Zyko	TF 10-0	January 31-February 3, 2017	2017 Dave Schultz Memorial International	(United States) Colorado Springs, Colorado
2016 World Clubs Cup (gold) as TMWC
Win	30-12	(Iran) Atsamaz Sanakoev	6-2	November 30-December 1, 2016	2016 World Wrestling Clubs Cup	Kharkiv, Ukraine
Loss	29-12	(Ukraine) Semen Radulov	0-5	November 30-December 1, 2016	2016 World Wrestling Clubs Cup	Kharkiv, Ukraine
Loss	29-11	(Georgia (country)) Aleksander Jatchvadze	1-3	November 30-December 1, 2016	2016 World Wrestling Clubs Cup	Kharkiv, Ukraine
Win	29-10	(Ukraine) Vasil Mikhailov	10-5	November 30-December 1, 2016	2016 World Wrestling Clubs Cup	Kharkiv, Ukraine
2016 US Last Chance OTT (silver) at 65 kg
Loss	28-10	(United States) Bernard Futrell	2-8	April 1–4, 2016	2016 US Last Chance Olympic Team Trials Qualifier	(United States) Cedar Falls, Iowa
Win	28-9	(United States) Nick Dardanes	4-3	April 1–4, 2016	2016 US Last Chance Olympic Team Trials Qualifier	(United States) Cedar Falls, Iowa
Win	27-9	(United States) Max Thomsen	8-3	April 1–4, 2016	2016 US Last Chance Olympic Team Trials Qualifier	(United States) Cedar Falls, Iowa
Win	26-9	(United States) John Meeks	10-2	April 1–4, 2016	2016 US Last Chance Olympic Team Trials Qualifier	(United States) Cedar Falls, Iowa
2016 Dave Schultz M. International (bronze) at 65 kg
Win	25-9	(United States) Dave Habat	TF 10-0	January 28–30, 2016	2016 Dave Schultz Memorial International	(United States) Colorado Springs, Colorado
Win	24-9	(United States) Nick Dardanes	TF 12-0	January 28–30, 2016	2016 Dave Schultz Memorial International	(United States) Colorado Springs, Colorado
Loss	23-9	(United States) Bernard Futrell	1-4	January 28–30, 2016	2016 Dave Schultz Memorial International	(United States) Colorado Springs, Colorado
Win	23-8	(United States) Dave Habat	TF 11-0	January 28–30, 2016	2016 Dave Schultz Memorial International	(United States) Colorado Springs, Colorado
2015 US Nationals at 65 kg
Loss	22-8	(United States) Frank Molinaro	7-16	December 17–19, 2015	2015 Senior Nationals & Trials Qualifier	(United States) Las Vegas, Nevada
Win	22-7	(United States) Jayson Ness	13-4	December 17–19, 2015	2015 Senior Nationals & Trials Qualifier	(United States) Las Vegas, Nevada
Loss	21-7	(United States) Bernard Futrell	TF 0-12	December 17–19, 2015	2015 Senior Nationals & Trials Qualifier	(United States) Las Vegas, Nevada
Win	21-6	(United States) Marcus Cobbs	TF 10-0	December 17–19, 2015	2015 Senior Nationals & Trials Qualifier	(United States) Las Vegas, Nevada
2015 Henri Deglane Challenge (gold) at 65 kg
Win	20-6	(Romania) George Bucur	8-6	November 27–28, 2015	2015 Henri Deglane Challenge	Nice, France
Win	19-6	(France) Maxime Fiquet	8-7	November 27–28, 2015	2015 Henri Deglane Challenge	Nice, France
Win	18-6	(Cuba) Lázaro Carbonell	TF 13-2	November 27–28, 2015	2015 Henri Deglane Challenge	Nice, France
Win	17-6	(Iran) Ali Samiei Paghaleh	TF 10-0	November 27–28, 2015	2015 Henri Deglane Challenge	Nice, France
2015 Bill Farrell International Open at 65 kg
Loss	16-6	(United States) Aaron Pico	2-8	November 5–7, 2015	2015 Bill Farrell International Open	(United States) New York City
Win	16-5	(United States) Mario Mason	9-5	November 5–7, 2015	2015 Bill Farrell International Open	(United States) New York City
Loss	15-5	(United States) Jordan Oliver	2-5	November 5–7, 2015	2015 Bill Farrell International Open	(United States) New York City
Win	15-4	(United States) Jayson Ness	9-2	November 5–7, 2015	2015 Bill Farrell International Open	(United States) New York City
Win	14-4	(United States) Isiah DeGuzman	TF 10-0	November 5–7, 2015	2015 Bill Farrell International Open	(United States) New York City
2015 US World Team Trials 5th at 70 kg
Loss	13-4	(United States) Kevin LeValley	3-5	June 12–14, 2015	2015 US World Team Trials Challenge Tournament	(United States) Madison, Wisconsin
Win	13-3	(United States) Derek St. John	TF 10-0	June 12–14, 2015	2015 US World Team Trials Challenge Tournament	(United States) Madison, Wisconsin
Win	12-3	(United States) Adam Hall	TF 10-0	June 12–14, 2015	2015 US World Team Trials Challenge Tournament	(United States) Madison, Wisconsin
Loss	11-3	(United States) James Green	7-9	June 12–14, 2015	2015 US World Team Trials Challenge Tournament	(United States) Madison, Wisconsin
2015 Phil Portuese NE Regional (gold) at 70 kg
Win	11-2	(United States) Rick Durso	5-0	May 1–3, 2015	2015 Phil Portuese Northeastern Regionals	(United States) East Stroudsburg, Pennsylvania
Win	10-2	(United States) Fox Baldwin	TF 12-2	May 1–3, 2015	2015 Phil Portuese Northeastern Regionals	(United States) East Stroudsburg, Pennsylvania
Win	9-2	(United States) Connor Lapresi	TF 10-0	May 1–3, 2015	2015 Phil Portuese Northeastern Regionals	(United States) East Stroudsburg, Pennsylvania
Win	8-2	(United States) Michael Mitchell	TF 10-0	May 1–3, 2015	2015 Phil Portuese Northeastern Regionals	(United States) East Stroudsburg, Pennsylvania
Win	7-2	(United States) Carlos Rodriguez	Fall	May 1–3, 2015	2015 Phil Portuese Northeastern Regionals	(United States) East Stroudsburg, Pennsylvania
2015 Dave Schultz M. International 4th at 70 kg
Loss	6-2	(United States) Kevin LeValley	3-5	January 28–31, 2015	2015 Dave Schultz Memorial International	(United States) Colorado Springs, Colorado
Win	6-1	(Japan) Nobuyoshi Takojima	9-2	January 28–31, 2015	2015 Dave Schultz Memorial International	(United States) Colorado Springs, Colorado
Loss	5-1	(United States) Dustin Schlatter	TF 0-10	January 28–31, 2015	2015 Dave Schultz Memorial International	(United States) Colorado Springs, Colorado
Win	5-0	(United States) Vladyslav Dombrovskiy	7-4	January 28–31, 2015	2015 Dave Schultz Memorial International	(United States) Colorado Springs, Colorado
Win	4-0	(Mongolia) Ganbayar Sanjaa	10-9	January 28–31, 2015	2015 Dave Schultz Memorial International	(United States) Colorado Springs, Colorado
2014 Minnesota Storm Holiday Cup (gold) at 70 kg
Win	3-0	(United States) Michael Mitchell	Fall	December 18–20, 2014	2014 Minnesota Storm Holiday Cup	(United States) Rochester, Minnesota
Win	2-0	(United States) Joe Carr	Fall	December 18–20, 2014	2014 Minnesota Storm Holiday Cup	(United States) Rochester, Minnesota
Win	1-0	(United States) Kevin LeValley	5-4	December 18–20, 2014	2014 Minnesota Storm Holiday Cup	(United States) Rochester, Minnesota

== NCAA record ==
NCAA Division III Championships Matches
Res.	Record	Opponent	Score	Date	Event
2014 NCAA (DIII) Championships (gold) at 157 lbs
Win	12-0	Dimitri Boyer	Fall	March 15, 2014	2014 NCAA Division III Wrestling Championships
Win	11-0	Reece Lefever	3-2	March 15, 2014	2014 NCAA Division III Wrestling Championships
Win	10-0	Brett Yonkovic	5-3	March 15, 2014	2014 NCAA Division III Wrestling Championships
Win	9-0	Josh Etzel	10-5	March 15, 2014	2014 NCAA Division III Wrestling Championships
2013 NCAA (DIII) Championships (gold) at 165 lbs
Win	8-0	John Darling	5-3	March 21, 2013	2013 NCAA Division III Wrestling Championships
Win	7-0	Joey Favia	7-2	March 21, 2013	2013 NCAA Division III Wrestling Championships
Win	6-0	Owen Vernon	7-6	March 21, 2013	2013 NCAA Division III Wrestling Championships
Win	5-0	Garrett Bonte	SV-1 5-3	March 21, 2013	2013 NCAA Division III Wrestling Championships
2012 NCAA (DIII) Championships (gold) at 157 lbs
Win	4-0	Orlando Ponce	10-9	March 10, 2012	2012 NCAA Division III Wrestling Championships
Win	3-0	John Darling	MD 14-5	March 10, 2012	2012 NCAA Division III Wrestling Championships
Win	2-0	Cole Welter	8-5	March 10, 2012	2012 NCAA Division III Wrestling Championships
Win	1-0	Troy Sterling	5-2	March 10, 2012	2012 NCAA Division III Wrestling Championships
