= 2017 World Wrestling Championships – Men's freestyle 97 kg =

Men's freestyle 97 kg at the 2017 World Championships
- Venue: AccorHotels Arena
- Dates: 26 August 2017
- Competitors: 26 from 26 nations

Medalists
gold medal	Kyle Snyder	United States
silver medal	Abdulrashid Sadulaev	Russia
bronze medal	Aslanbek Alborov	Azerbaijan
bronze medal	Georgy Ketoev	Armenia

The men's freestyle 97 kilograms is a competition featured at the 2017 World Wrestling Championships, and was held in Paris, France on 26 August 2017.

This freestyle wrestling competition consisted of a single-elimination tournament, with a repechage used to determine the winners of two bronze medals.

== Results ==
Legend

- F — Won by fall
- R — Retired

=== Final ===
Final
Kyle Snyder (USA)	6
Abdulrashid Sadulaev (RUS)	5

=== Top half ===
Round of 32
Ölziisaikhany Batzul (MGL)	2^{R}
Nicolae Ceban (MDA)	3
Ragnar Kaasik (EST)	0
Magomedgaji Nurov (MKD)	10
Rıza Yıldırım (TUR)	3
Aslanbek Alborov (AZE)	5
Kim Jae-gang (KOR)	4
Gabriel Stark (GER)	1

Round of 16
Kyle Snyder (USA)	10
Mamed Ibragimov (KAZ)	0
Naoya Akaguma (JPN)	8
Nicolae Ceban (MDA)	3
Magomedgaji Nurov (MKD)	3
Aslanbek Alborov (AZE)	3
Kim Jae-gang (KOR)	4
Magomed Musaev (KGZ)	0

Quarterfinals
Kyle Snyder (USA)	10
Naoya Akaguma (JPN)	0
Aslanbek Alborov (AZE)	11
Kim Jae-gang (KOR)	0

Semifinals
Kyle Snyder (USA)	9
Aslanbek Alborov (AZE)	2

=== Bottom half ===
Round of 32
Timofei Xenidis (GRE)	4
Pavlo Oliynyk (UKR)	14
Mateusz Filipczak (POL)	8
Luis Miguel Pérez (DOM)	2
Abdulrashid Sadulaev (RUS)	3
Reineris Salas (CUB)	0
Zhang Haiming (CHN)	0
Satyawart Kadian (IND)	6^{F}
Maxime François (FRA)	1
Georgy Ketoev (ARM)	8
Amir Mohammadi (IRI)	8
Aliaksandr Hushtyn (BLR)	6

Round of 16
Elizbar Odikadze (GEO)	8
Pavlo Oliynyk (UKR)	0
Mateusz Filipczak (POL)	0
Abdulrashid Sadulaev (RUS)	13
Satyawart Kadian (IND)	0
Georgy Ketoev (ARM)	5
Amir Mohammadi (IRI)	4
Magomed Ibragimov (UZB)	10

Quarterfinals
Elizbar Odikadze (GEO)	0
Abdulrashid Sadulaev (RUS)	10
Georgy Ketoev (ARM)	12
Magomed Ibragimov (UZB)	2

Semifinals
Abdulrashid Sadulaev (RUS)	2
Georgy Ketoev (ARM)	0

=== Repechage ===
Repechage round 1
Reineris Salas (CUB)	4
Mateusz Filipczak (POL)	3

Repechage round 2
Mamed Ibragimov (KAZ)	10
Naoya Akaguma (JPN)	0
Reineris Salas (CUB)	6
Elizbar Odikadze (GEO)	8

Bronze medals
Mamed Ibragimov (KAZ)	2
Aslanbek Alborov (AZE)	3
Elizbar Odikadze (GEO)	2
Georgy Ketoev (ARM)	2
