= 2015 World Wrestling Championships – Men's freestyle 70 kg =

Men's freestyle 70 kg at the 2015 World Championships
- Venue: Orleans Arena
- Dates: 12 September 2015
- Competitors: 33 from 33 nations

Medalists
| gold medal | Magomedrasul Gazimagomedov | Russia |
| silver medal | Hassan Yazdani | Iran |
| bronze medal | Yakup Gör | Turkey |
| bronze medal | James Green | United States |

The men's freestyle 70 kilograms is a competition featured at the 2015 World Wrestling Championships, and was held in Las Vegas, United States on 12 September 2015.

== Results ==
Legend

- F — Won by fall
- WO — Won by walkover

=== Finals ===
| Semifinals | | Final |
| Azamat Nurykau (BLR) | 1 |
| Magomedrasul Gazimagomedov (RUS) | 7 | Magomedrasul Gazimagomedov (RUS) | 10 |
| James Green (USA) | 4 | Hassan Yazdani (IRI) | 3 |
| Hassan Yazdani (IRI) | 9 |

=== Top half ===
==== Section 1 ====
Round of 64

Round of 32
Ling Haiwei (CHN) | 4^{F}
Víctor Hernández (MEX) | 0
Orazberdi Şaberdiýew (TKM) | 0
Azamat Nurykau (BLR) | 8
Roman Dermenji (MDA) | 2
Bekzod Abdurakhmonov (UZB) | 12
Dejan Mitrov (MKD) | 0
Ruslan Dibirgadjiyev (AZE) | 10

Round of 16
Ling Haiwei (CHN) | 5
Azamat Nurykau (BLR) | 11
Bekzod Abdurakhmonov (UZB) | 4
Ruslan Dibirgadjiyev (AZE) | 2

Quarterfinals
Azamat Nurykau (BLR) | 5
Bekzod Abdurakhmonov (UZB) | 4

==== Section 2 ====
Round of 64

Round of 32
Nurlan Bekzhanov (KAZ) | 8
Gamid Dzhalilov (TJK) | 6
Magomedrasul Gazimagomedov (RUS) | 2^{F}
Batchuluuny Ankhbayar (MGL) | 0
Shanaka Madushanka (SRI) | 0
Andreas Triantafyllidis (GRE) | 10
Yakup Gör (TUR) | 6
Nicolae Cojocaru (ROU) | 0

Round of 16
Nurlan Bekzhanov (KAZ) | 0
Magomedrasul Gazimagomedov (RUS) | 9
Andreas Triantafyllidis (GRE) | 1
Yakup Gör (TUR) | 6

Quarterfinals
Magomedrasul Gazimagomedov (RUS) | 9
Yakup Gör (TUR) | 1

=== Bottom half ===
==== Section 3 ====
Round of 64

Round of 32
Cruiz Manning (CAN) | 0
Semen Radulov (UKR) | 10
Cấn Tất Dự (VIE) | 0
Arun Kumar (IND) | 7
Robert Ollé (SVK) | 5
Philipp Crepaz (AUT) | 1
James Green (USA) | 10
Johnathan Scott (CRC) | 0

Round of 16
Semen Radulov (UKR) | 4
Arun Kumar (IND) | 5
Robert Ollé (SVK) | 1
James Green (USA) | 12

Quarterfinals
Arun Kumar (IND) | 0
James Green (USA) | 10

==== Section 4 ====
Round of 64
Ayad Ibrahim (EGY) | 7
Davit Tlashadze (GEO) | 14

Round of 32
Hassan Yazdani (IRI) | 16
Jung Young-ho (KOR) | 4
Yoan Blanco (ECU) | 5
Miroslav Kirov (BUL) | 7
Zsombor Gulyás (HUN) | 1
Takafumi Kojima (JPN) | 2
Mostafa Rezaeifar (AUS) | 0
Davit Tlashadze (GEO) | 10

Round of 16
Hassan Yazdani (IRI) | 6^{F}
Miroslav Kirov (BUL) | 1
Takafumi Kojima (JPN) | 3
Davit Tlashadze (GEO) | 5

Quarterfinals
Hassan Yazdani (IRI) | 6^{F}
Davit Tlashadze (GEO) | 0

=== Repechage ===
Repechage round 2
Batchuluuny Ankhbayar (MGL)
Nurlan Bekzhanov (KAZ) | WO
Jung Young-ho (KOR) | 1
Miroslav Kirov (BUL) | 4

Repechage round 3
Nurlan Bekzhanov (KAZ) | 4
Yakup Gör (TUR) | 15
Miroslav Kirov (BUL) | 6
Davit Tlashadze (GEO) | 2

Bronze medals
Yakup Gör (TUR) | 9
Azamat Nurykau (BLR) | 8
Miroslav Kirov (BUL) | 0
James Green (USA) | 8^{F}
