= Isaiah Martinez =

American wrestler (born 1994)

Personal information
- Full name: Isaiah Alexander Martinez
- Nickname: Imar
- Born: September 2, 1994 (age 31) Lemoore, California, U.S.
- Height: 5 ft 7 in (170 cm)
- Weight: 74 kg (163 lb)

Sport
- Country: United States
- Sport: Wrestling
- Events: Freestyle and Folkstyle
- College team: Fighting Illini
- Club: The Dam RTC
- Coached by: Jim Heffernan
Medal record
Men's freestyle wrestling
Representing the United States
World Cup
Gold medal – first place	2018 Iowa City	Team
Bronze medal – third place	2019 Yakutsk	Team
US National Championships
Gold medal – first place	2018 Las Vegas	74 kg
Gold medal – first place	2019 Las Vegas	74 kg
Silver medal – second place	2021 Coralville	79 kg
Men's collegiate wrestling
Representing the Illinois Fighting Illini
NCAA Division I Championships
Gold medal – first place	2015 St. Louis	157 lb
Gold medal – first place	2016 New York	157 lb
Silver medal – second place	2017 St. Louis	165 lb
Silver medal – second place	2018 Cleveland	165 lb
Big Ten Championships
Gold medal – first place	2015 Columbus	157 lb
Gold medal – first place	2016 Iowa City	157 lb
Gold medal – first place	2017 Bloomington	165 lb
Gold medal – first place	2018 East Lansing	165 lb

Isaiah Alexander Martinez (born September 2, 1994) is an American freestyle wrestler and graduated folkstyle wrestler who competes at 79 kilograms. In freestyle, Martinez is a two-time US Open National champion (three-time finalist) and was the 2017 US U23 World Team Member. As a folkstyle wrestler, he was a two-time NCAA Division I National champion (four-time finalist) and a four-time Big Ten Conference champion.

== Folkstyle ==
=== High school ===
Martinez was born and raised in Lemoore, California. He started wrestling at a young age and became a three-time CIF state champion and four-time placer with a 205–7 record as a high schooler at Lemoore High School.

=== University ===
Martinez attended the University of Illinois to wrestle as a collegiate athlete.

==== 2013–2014 ====
Redshirt; Compiled a 13–2 record during the season (7–0 at open tournaments) and placed fourth at Midlands.

==== 2014–2015 ====
Freshman; Midlands and Roadrunner Open undefeated champion during regular season. Won the Big Ten Conference and the NCAA championship with notable wins over Dylan Ness, James Green, Nick Brascetta and Brian Realbuto, being the first one to win the championship as an undefeated freshman since Cael Sanderson (99').

==== 2015–2016 ====
Sophomore; Posted a 17–1 record at duals with lone loss to future three-time NCAA champion Jason Nolf and became the Reno TOC champion during regular season. Won the Big Ten Conference title while avenging his regular season's loss to Jason Nolf. At the NCAA's, he defeated #3 ranked Ian Miller and top-ranked Jason Nolf for the second time to claim the championship.

==== 2016–2017 ====
Junior; Bumped up a weight class and competed at 165 pounds. He became the UNI Open & Midlands champion and compiled an 11–0 record at duals, ending regular season unbeaten. Became a three-time Big Ten Conference champion and entered as the top-seeded wrestler at the NCAA championships. At the tournament, he made his way to the finale in where he faced Vincenzo Joseph, whom he was 2-0 prior to the match. He lost by fall and claimed runner-up honors.

==== 2017–2018 ====
Senior; Compiled a record of 11–0 at dual matches in regular season. Became the sixteenth wrestler to ever win four Big Ten Conference championships when he beat Vincenzo Joseph at the finale of the tournament, also entering as the top-ranked seed at the NCAA championships. He defeated four opponents on his way to the finale, in which he faced Vincenzo Joseph for the fifth time in their collegiate career and lost for the second time, claiming once again runner-up honors.

Overall, Martinez is a two-time NCAA champion, four-time NCAA finalist, and four-time Big Ten Conference champion, which makes him the most accomplished Fighting Illini in the history of the wrestling team.

== Freestyle ==
=== Junior ===
As a youth level wrestler, Martinez was a Junior National runner-up and Junior Fargo National champion in both, freestyle and Greco-Roman.

=== U23 and Senior level ===
==== 2016 ====
Martinez made his senior freestyle debut at the University National Championships. He defeated all of his opponents by technical fall until the best of three, where he won on points and then by technical fall to win the championship.

==== 2017 ====
A year later, he competed at the Last Chance Qualifier for the World Team Trials. He defeated three opponents, outscoring them 34-1 and qualifying for the World Team Trials Challenge tournament. There, he passed the quarterfinals with a technical fall win but subsequently lost to four-time NCAA champion Kyle Dake on points and faced three-time NCAA champion Alex Dieringer at the true second match. He also lost the bout by points, placing third at the World Team Trials Challenge.

After failing to make the World Team, Martinez, who was 23 years old at the time, competed at the U23 World Team Trials. He defeated his opponent on points twice and earned his shot at the U23 World Championships.

At the U23 World Championships, he was defeated in the first round by the eventual winner of the championship Gadzhi Nabiev and was thrown to the consolation bracket. There, he defeated two opponents by technical fall and performed at the bronze medal match, where he was defeated by technical fall himself, placing fifth.

==== 2018 ====
In his first freestyle competition of the year, Martinez attended the US Open. He defeated his first opponent by fall and the other four by technical fall, without getting scored once through the tournament and winning the championship.

After winning the US Open, Martinez automatically advanced to the best-of-three finals of the World Team Trials Challenge. He defeated three-time NCAA Division III champion Nazar Kulchytskyy twice by technical fall and advanced to Final X. At Final X: Lincoln, he faced Olympic gold medalist and four-time World Champion Jordan Burroughs in a best-of-three. He lost the first match by points and the second by technical fall.

He then competed in his first non-world championship international tournament at the senior level, the Medved Prizes. He defeated two opponents to advance to the semifinals but was beaten on points. At the bronze medal match, he defeated his opponent 11 points to 2, claiming the bronze medal.

==== 2019 ====
To start the year, Martinez competed at the prestigious Golden Grand Prix Ivan Yarygin. He was eliminated in the first round in a close 10–11 loss.

In March, Martinez competed at the World Cup along with the US team. He competed in four matches and defeated all of his opponents (two by technical fall), winning the crown at the 74 kilograms division, even though Team USA placed third as a team.

Next, he competed at the US Open. He won his second straight title at the event by defeating all four of his opponents.

By winning the US Open title, Martinez was automatically set to compete at the finals of the World Team Trials Challenge. The man who won the bracket until the finals was his former collegiate rival Jason Nolf, whom he had to face in a best-of-three. He won the first match by points but subsequently lost by the same method, leading to a third and final match. Despite the earlier bouts being fairly close, he defeated Nolf by technical fall, qualifying for Final X.

A month later, he competed at Final X: Lincoln against Olympic Gold medalist and four-time World Champion Jordan Burroughs in a best-of-three, just like last year (18'). As a big underdog, he lost the first match in a close 4-5 but came back with an upset in the second match, beating Burroughs by criteria with 5 points to 5. At the third and final match, Martinez couldn't hold up and lost the match on points (1-7). This gained him recognition as a top prospect, as he was expected to lose two matches in a row against the 19' World Team Member.

After his failed attempt of making it to the World Championships, he competed at the Continental Cup. He defeated three opponents to make the finals, where he lost by technical fall and earned runner-up honors.

In his last competition of the year, he attended the Bill Farrell Memorial. He opened up with a fall and a technical fall and won his next two bouts on points to make it to the finals. At the finale, he faced collegiate and now international rival Jason Nolf, whom he defeated by technical fall.

==== 2020–2021 ====
Martinez was scheduled to compete at the US Olympic Team Trials on April 4, 2020, at State College, Pennsylvania. However, the event was postponed for 2021 along with the Summer Olympics due to the COVID-19 pandemic, leaving all the qualifiers unable to compete.

After a year and a half of no competition, Martinez was expected to compete at the rescheduled US Olympic Trials in April 2–3, 2021, as the number one seed (aside from Jordan Burroughs and Kyle Dake, both sitting out), but was forced to pull out due to an injury.

Martinez came back to competition from May 1 to 2 at the US Open National Championships as the number one seed, while also moving up to 79 kilograms. After four victories to reach the finals, Martinez was forced to forfeit, claiming runner–up honors.

== Freestyle record ==
Senior & U23 Freestyle Matches
Res.	Record	Opponent	Score	Date	Event	Location
2021 US World Team Trials DNP at 79 kg
		(United States) Carter Starocci	FF	September 11–12, 2021	2021 US World Team Trials	(United States) Lincoln, Nebraska
Loss	50–13	(United States) Alex Dieringer	1–6	September 11–12, 2021	2021 US World Team Trials	(United States) Lincoln, Nebraska
Win	50–12	(United States) Taylor Lujan	10–7	September 11–12, 2021	2021 US World Team Trials	(United States) Lincoln, Nebraska
Win	49–12	(United States) Branson Ashworth	11–10	September 11–12, 2021	2021 US World Team Trials	(United States) Lincoln, Nebraska
2021 US Open (silver) at 79 kg
Win	48–12	(United States) Devin Skatzka	Fall	May 1, 2021	2021 US Open National Championships	(United States) Coralville, Iowa
Win	47–12	(United States) Travis Wittlake	9–3	May 1, 2021	2021 US Open National Championships	(United States) Coralville, Iowa
Win	46–12	(United States) Hunter Mullin	TF 10–0	May 1, 2021	2021 US Open National Championships	(United States) Coralville, Iowa
Win	45–12	(United States) Shane Gantz	TF 12–0	May 1, 2021	2021 US Open National Championships	(United States) Coralville, Iowa
2019 Bill Farrell Memorial (gold) at 74kg
Win	44-12	(United States) Jason Nolf	TF 12-0	November 16, 2019	2019 Bill Farrell Memorial International Open	(United States) New York, New York
Win	43-12	(United States) Thomas Gantt	8-7	November 16, 2019	2019 Bill Farrell Memorial International Open	(United States) New York, New York
Win	42-12	(United States) Nazar Kulchytskyy	12-5	November 16, 2019	2019 Bill Farrell Memorial International Open	(United States) New York, New York
Win	41-12	(United States) Nick Incontrera	TF 10-0	November 16, 2019	2019 Bill Farrell Memorial International Open	(United States) New York, New York
Win	40-12	(Mongolia) Gantulga Shijir	Fall	November 16, 2019	2019 Bill Farrell Memorial International Open	(United States) New York, New York
2019 Continental Cup (silver) at 79kg
Loss	39-12	(Russia) Atsamaz Sanakoev	TF 0-10	October 14, 2019	2019 Intercontinental Wrestling Cup	Khasavyurt, Russia
Win	39-11	(Kazakhstan) Zhiger Zakirov	TF 12-2	October 14, 2019	2019 Intercontinental Wrestling Cup	Khasavyurt, Russia
Win	38-11	(Russia) Adam Khasiev	9-9	October 14, 2019	2019 Intercontinental Wrestling Cup	Khasavyurt, Russia
Win	37-11	(Uzbekistan) Davlat Khodjiev	TF 10-0	October 14, 2019	2019 Intercontinental Wrestling Cup	Khasavyurt, Russia
2019 US World Team Trials (silver) at 74kg
Loss	36-11	(United States) Jordan Burroughs	1-7	June 15, 2019	2019 Final X: Lincoln	(United States) Lincoln, Nebraska
Win	36-10	(United States) Jordan Burroughs	5-5	June 15, 2019	2019 Final X: Lincoln	(United States) Lincoln, Nebraska
Loss	35-10	(United States) Jordan Burroughs	4-5	June 15, 2019	2019 Final X: Lincoln	(United States) Lincoln, Nebraska
Win	35-9	(United States) Jason Nolf	TF 12-2	May 19, 2019	2019 US World Team Trials Challenge	(United States) Raleigh, North Carolina
Loss	34-9	(United States) Jason Nolf	5-7	May 19, 2019	2019 US World Team Trials Challenge	(United States) Raleigh, North Carolina
Win	34-8	(United States) Jason Nolf	9-4	May 19, 2019	2019 US World Team Trials Challenge	(United States) Raleigh, North Carolina
2019 US Open (gold) at 74kg
Win	33-8	(United States) Thomas Gantt	6-4	April 27, 2019	2019 US Open Wrestling Championships	(United States) Las Vegas, Nevada
Win	32-8	(United States) Brian Murphy	TF 13-0	April 27, 2019	2019 US Open Wrestling Championships	(United States) Las Vegas, Nevada
Win	31-8	(United States) Joey Lavallee	TF 13-2	April 27, 2019	2019 US Open Wrestling Championships	(United States) Las Vegas, Nevada
Win	30-8	(United States) Dillon Ulrey	TF 10-0	April 27, 2019	2019 US Open Wrestling Championships	(United States) Las Vegas, Nevada
2019 World Cup (gold) at 74kg
Win	29-8	(Japan) Yuto Miwa	TF 10-0	March 17, 2019	2019 Wrestling World Cup	Yakutsk, Russia
Win	28-8	(Mongolia) Bat-Erdene Byambadorj	TF 11-0	March 17, 2019	2019 Wrestling World Cup	Yakutsk, Russia
Win	27-8	(Iran) Reza Afzali	6-2	March 17, 2019	2019 Wrestling World Cup	Yakutsk, Russia
Win	26-8	(Georgia (country)) Zurabi Erbotsonashvili	10-6	March 17, 2019	2019 Wrestling World Cup	Yakutsk, Russia
2019 Golden Grand Prix Ivan Yarygin 10th at 74kg
Loss	25-8	(Belarus) Azamat Nurykau	10-11	January 24, 2019	2019 Ivan Yarygin Golden Grand Prix	Krasnoyarsk, Russia
2018 Medved International (bronze) at 74kg
Win	25-7	(Russia) Magoma Dibirgadzhiev	11-2	September 15, 2018	2018 Alexander Medved Prizes Ranking Series	Minsk, Belarus
Loss	24-7	(Belarus) Azamat Nurykau	5-8	September 15, 2018	2018 Alexander Medved Prizes Ranking Series	Minsk, Belarus
Win	24-6	(Lithuania) Andrius Mazeika	11-9	September 15, 2018	2018 Alexander Medved Prizes Ranking Series	Minsk, Belarus
Win	23-6	(Ukraine) Ivan Kusyak	8-0	September 15, 2018	2018 Alexander Medved Prizes Ranking Series	Minsk, Belarus
2018 US World Team Trials (silver) at 74kg
Loss	22-6	(United States) Jordan Burroughs	TF 1-11	June 9, 2018	2018 Final X: Lincoln	(United States) Lincoln, Nebraska
Loss	22-5	(United States) Jordan Burroughs	1-4	June 9, 2018	2018 Final X: Lincoln	(United States) Lincoln, Nebraska
Win	22-4	(United States) Nazar Kulchytskyy	TF 13-2	May 20, 2018	2018 US World Team Trials Challenge	(United States) Rochester, Minnesota
Win	21-4	(United States) Nazar Kulchytskyy	TF 13-2	May 20, 2018	2018 US World Team Trials Challenge	(United States) Rochester, Minnesota
2018 US Open (gold) at 74kg
Win	20-4	(United States) Dan Vallimont	TF 10-0	April 28, 2018	2018 US Open Wrestling Championships	(United States) Las Vegas, Nevada
Win	19-4	(United States) Jake Sueflohn	TF 11-0	April 28, 2018	2018 US Open Wrestling Championships	(United States) Las Vegas, Nevada
Win	18-4	(United States) Jacen Petersen	TF 10-0	April 28, 2018	2018 US Open Wrestling Championships	(United States) Las Vegas, Nevada
Win	17-4	(United States) Connor Keating	TF 10-0	April 28, 2018	2018 US Open Wrestling Championships	(United States) Las Vegas, Nevada
Win	16-4	(United States) Jacob Thalin	Fall	April 28, 2018	2018 US Open Wrestling Championships	(United States) Las Vegas, Nevada
2017 U23 World Championships 5th at 74kg
Loss	15-4	(Georgia (country)) Avtandil Kentchadze	TF 0-11	November 25, 2017	2017 World U23 Wrestling Championship	Bydgoszcz, Poland
Win	15-3	(Kazakhstan) Yerkebulan Tileu	TF 11-0	November 25, 2017	2017 World U23 Wrestling Championship	Bydgoszcz, Poland
Win	14-3	(Lithuania) Andrius Mazeika	TF 13-2	November 25, 2017	2017 World U23 Wrestling Championship	Bydgoszcz, Poland
Loss	13-3	(Russia) Gadzhi Nabiev	5-6	November 25, 2017	2017 World U23 Wrestling Championship	Bydgoszcz, Poland
2017 US U23 World Team Trials (gold) at 74kg
Win	13-2	(United States) Chance Marsteller	7-6	October 8, 2017	2017 US U23 World Team Trials	(United States) Rochester, Minnesota
Win	12-2	(United States) Chance Marsteller	8-2	October 8, 2017	2017 US U23 World Team Trials	(United States) Rochester, Minnesota
2017 US World Team Trials (bronze) at 74kg
Loss	11-2	(United States) Alex Dieringer	2-4	June 9, 2017	2017 US World Team Trials Challenge	(United States) Lincoln, Nebraska
Loss	11-1	(United States) Kyle Dake	2-9	June 9, 2017	2017 US World Team Trials Challenge	(United States) Lincoln, Nebraska
Win	11-0	(United States) Kevin LeValley	TF 10-0	June 9, 2017	2017 US World Team Trials Challenge	(United States) Lincoln, Nebraska
2017 US Last Chance OTT (gold) at 74kg
Win	10-0	(United States) Nick Wanzek	TF 10-0	May 22, 2017	2017 US Senior Last Chance World Team Trials Qualifier	(United States) Rochester, Minnesota
Win	9-0	(United States) Alfred Daniel	TF 11-0	May 22, 2017	2017 US Senior Last Chance World Team Trials Qualifier	(United States) Rochester, Minnesota
Win	8-0	(United States) Michael Schmitz	TF 13-1	May 22, 2017	2017 US Senior Last Chance World Team Trials Qualifier	(United States) Rochester, Minnesota
2016 US University Nationals (gold) at 74kg
Win	7-0	(United States) Chance Marsteller	TF 15-5	June 6, 2016	2016 US University National Championships	(United States) Akron, Ohio
Win	6-0	(United States) Chance Marsteller	14-10	June 6, 2016	2016 US University National Championships	(United States) Akron, Ohio
Win	5-0	(United States) Tyrel White	TF 10-0	June 6, 2016	2016 US University National Championships	(United States) Akron, Ohio
Win	4-0	(United States) Nate Higgins	TF 10-0	June 6, 2016	2016 US University National Championships	(United States) Akron, Ohio
Win	3-0	(United States) Raider Lofthouse	TF 10-0	June 6, 2016	2016 US University National Championships	(United States) Akron, Ohio
Win	2-0	(United States) Marquint Bryant	TF 12-2	June 6, 2016	2016 US University National Championships	(United States) Akron, Ohio
Win	1-0	(United States) Evan Delong	TF 13-2	June 6, 2016	2016 US University National Championships	(United States) Akron, Ohio

== NCAA record ==
NCAA Championships Matches
Res.	Record	Opponent	Score	Date	Event
2018 NCAA Championships (silver) at 165 lbs
Loss	17-2	Vincenzo Joseph	1-6	March 17, 2018	2018 NCAA Division I Wrestling Championships
Win	17-1	Alex Marinelli	5-1	March 17, 2018	2018 NCAA Division I Wrestling Championships
Win	16-1	Chance Marsteller	MD 10-1	March 17, 2018	2018 NCAA Division I Wrestling Championships
Win	15-1	Jonathon Chavez	10-5	March 17, 2018	2018 NCAA Division I Wrestling Championships
Win	14-1	Zachary Carson	TF 20-5	March 17, 2018	2018 NCAA Division I Wrestling Championships
2017 NCAA Championships (silver) at 165 lbs
Loss	13-1	Vincenzo Joseph	Fall	March 18, 2018	2017 NCAA Division I Wrestling Championships
Win	13-0	Isaac Jordan	2-1	March 18, 2018	2017 NCAA Division I Wrestling Championships
Win	12-0	Nick Wanzek	8-5	March 18, 2018	2017 NCAA Division I Wrestling Championships
Win	11-0	Shaun`Qae McMurtry	MD 14-4	March 18, 2018	2017 NCAA Division I Wrestling Championships
2016 NCAA Championships (gold) at 157 lbs
Win	10-0	Jason Nolf	6-5	March 19, 2016	2016 NCAA Division I Wrestling Championships
Win	9-0	Ian Miller	SV-1 7-5	March 19, 2016	2016 NCAA Division I Wrestling Championships
Win	8-0	Nick Brascetta	6-3	March 19, 2016	2016 NCAA Division I Wrestling Championships
Win	7-0	Markus Scheidel	MD 15-4	March 19, 2016	2016 NCAA Division I Wrestling Championships
Win	6-0	Robert Henderson	TF 16-0	March 19, 2016	2016 NCAA Division I Wrestling Championships
2015 NCAA Championships (gold) at 157 lbs
Win	5-0	Brian Realbuto	9-2	March 21, 2015	2015 NCAA Division I Wrestling Championships
Win	4-0	James Green	3-2	March 21, 2015	2015 NCAA Division I Wrestling Championships
Win	3-0	Nick Brascetta	10-4	March 21, 2015	2015 NCAA Division I Wrestling Championships
Win	2-0	Spartak Chino	Fall	March 21, 2015	2015 NCAA Division I Wrestling Championships
Win	1-0	Russell Parsons	TF 18-2	March 21, 2015	2015 NCAA Division I Wrestling Championships

=== Stats ===
Season	Year	School	Rank	Weigh Class	Record	Win	Bonus
2018	Senior	University of Illinois	#1 (2nd)	165	18-1	94.74%	63.16%
2017	Junior	University of Illinois	#1 (2nd)	165	31-1	96.88%	68.75%
2016	Sophomore	University of Illinois	#2 (1st)	157	32-1	96.97%	66.67%
2015	Freshman	University of Illinois	#1 (1st)	157	35-0	100.00%	68.57%
Career					116-3	97.14%	66.79%

== Collegiate awards and records ==
- Senior (17-18)
  - (silver) NCAA Division I (165 lbs)
  - (gold) Big Ten Conference (165 lbs)
  - Big Ten Wrestler of the Championships
  - Big Ten Medal of Honor recipient
  Junior (16-17)
  - (gold) NCAA Division I (165 lbs)
  - (gold) Big Ten Conference (165 lbs)
  Sophomore (15-16)
  - (silver) NCAA Division I (157 lbs)
  - (gold) Big Ten Conference (157 lbs)
  - University of Illinois Dike Eddleman Male Athlete of the Year
  - Big Ten Wrestler of the Championships
  - News Gazette Male Athlete of the Year
  - Big Ten Wrestler of the Week (12/1/15)
  - Division I's most technical fall wins in the season (14)
  - Team's most dual points scored (83)
  Freshman (14-15)
  - (gold) NCAA Division I (157 lbs)
  - (gold) Big Ten Conference (157 lbs)
  - Dan Hodge Trophy finalist
  - Big Ten Freshman of the Year
  - InterMat Freshman of the Year
  - Amateur Wrestling News Rookie of the Year
  - Fighting Illini Male Newcomer of the Year
  - News Gazette Male Athlete of the Year
  - Division I's most technical fall wins in the season (11)

== Freestyle awards and honors ==
2019

- (gold) World Cup (74 kg)
- (silver) Intercontinental Cup (79 kg)
- (silver) Final X: Lincoln (74 kg)
- (gold) US Open (74 kg)

2018

- (silver) Final X: Lincoln (74 kg)
- (gold) US Open (74 kg)

2017

- (gold) US U23 World Team Trials (74 kg)
- (bronze) US World Team Trials (74 kg)
