= Aslanbek Alborov =

Azerbaijani amateur wrestler

Aslanbek Alborov Асланбек Алборов
Personal information
- Full name: Aslanbek Alborov
- Nationality: Russian; Azerbaijani
- Born: 2 April 1991 (age 35) Vladikavkaz, North Ossetia-Alania, Soviet Union
- Height: 1.85 m (6 ft 1 in)
- Weight: 92 kg (203 lb); 97 kg (214 lb)

Sport
- Country: Azerbaijan
- Sport: Wrestling
- Event: Freestyle
- Coached by: Alan Teziev, Vyacheslav Bagaev (Russia)
Medal record
Representing Azerbaijan
Men's Freestyle Wrestling
World Championships
Bronze medal – third place	2017 Paris	97 kg
European Championships
Bronze medal – third place	2020 Rome	92 kg

Aslanbek Alborov (Russian: Асланбек Алборов; born 2 April 1991 in Vladikavkaz) is a Russian former freestyle wrestler of Ossetian descent, who represented Azerbaijan in the light heavyweight division (97 kg). He was a 2017 world freestyle wrestling bronze medalist, 2018 world cup silver medalist, and 2017 Ali Aliyev Memorial winner.

At the 2017 World Cup he beat Olympic champion Kyle Snyder of Ohio, United States. A year later Alborov faced Snyder and beat him again at the 2018 Yashar Dogu international.

== Championships and achievements ==
- Senior:
  - Yashar Dogu 2017 - 1st (97 kg)
  - Yashar Dogu 2018 - 1st (97 kg)
  - Ali Aliyev Memorial 2017 - 1st (97 kg)
  - World Cup 2017 - 3rd
  - World Cup 2018 - 2nd
  - Intercontinental Cup 2017 - 1st (97 kg)
  - Moscow Lights (Al-Rosa cup) 2014 - 2nd
  - World Championship 2017 - 3rd
