= Amir Mohammadi =

Iranian-American mathematician

Amir Mohammadi is an Iranian-American mathematician and professor at the University of California, Berkeley. His research focuses on homogeneous dynamics, ergodic theory, and number theory.

== Career ==
Mohammadi earned his B.Sc. from Sharif University of Technology in 2002 and his Ph.D. from Yale University in 2009. He has held academic positions at the University of Chicago, the University of Texas at Austin, and UC San Diego before joining the University of California, Berkeley, in 2025.

He was a von Neumann Fellow at the Institute for Advanced Study during 2015–2016.

== Research ==
Mohammadi’s research is primarily in homogeneous dynamics and ergodic theory, with connections to arithmetic groups and Diophantine approximation. He has contributed to results on orbit closures, equidistribution, and measure classification, including work on the Oppenheim conjecture and effective methods in homogeneous spaces.

== Awards and honors ==
- Fellow of the American Mathematical Society, in its 2027 class of fellows.
- Brin Prize in Dynamical Systems (2024)
- Invited speaker at the International Congress of Mathematicians (2022)
- Sloan Research Fellowship (2014–2016)
- von Neumann Fellowship at the Institute for Advanced Study (2015–2016)

== Selected publications ==
- Eskin, Alex; Mirzakhani, Maryam; Mohammadi, Amir (2015). "Isolation, equidistribution, and orbit closures for the SL(2, R) action on moduli space". Annals of Mathematics. 182 (2): 673–721. doi:10.4007/annals.2015.182.2.6.
- Einsiedler, Manfred; Margulis, Gregory; Venkatesh, Akshay; Mohammadi, Amir (2020). "Effective equidistribution and property (τ)". Journal of the American Mathematical Society. 33 (4): 1147–1203. arXiv:1809.01714. doi:10.1090/jams/951. hdl:21.11116/0000-0008-021D-6.
