= Yakup Gör =

Turkish freestyle wrestler

Personal information
- Nationality: Turkish
- Born: November 10, 1988 (age 37) Erzurum, Turkey
- Years active: 2000-present
- Height: 1.74 m (5 ft 9 in)
- Weight: 73 kg (161 lb)

Sport
- Event: Freestyle
- Club: İstanbul Büyükşehir Belediyesi S.K.
- Coached by: Adem Bereket (2008- ); İbrahim Akgün (2006-08)
Medal record
Men's freestyle wrestling
Representing Turkey
World Championships
Silver medal – second place	2014 Tashkent	70 kg
Bronze medal – third place	2015 Las Vegas	70 kg
European Championships
Silver medal – second place	2013 Tbilisi	66kg
Bronze medal – third place	2014 Vantaa	70kg
European Games
Bronze medal – third place	2015 Baku	70kg
World Cup
Gold medal – first place	2013 Tehran	66 kg
Yasar Dogu Tournament
Gold medal – first place	2021 Istanbul	74 kg
Gold medal – first place	2014 Istanbul	70 kg
Gold medal – first place	2013 Ankara	66 kg
Silver medal – second place	2012 Ankara	66 kg
Bronze medal – third place	2020 Istanbul	74 kg
Golden Grand Prix Ivan Yarygin
Silver medal – second place	2019 Krasnoyarsk	74 kg
Golden Grand Prix
Bronze medal – third place	2011 Baku	66 kg

Yakup Gör (born November 10, 1988, in Erzurum, Turkey) is a Turkish freestyle wrestler competing in the 66 kg division. He is a member of the İstanbul Büyükşehir Belediyesi S.K.

He began with wrestling in his hometown Erzurum, where he was instructed and coached at the city wrestling training center. Before he transferred to Istanbul BB SK, Gör competed for the Erzurum Büyükşehir Belediyesi Sk.

== Achievements ==
He became bronze medalist at the 2010 Mediterranean Championships on May 7 in Istanbul, Turkey.

Gör shared the bronze medal with his national teammate Muhammed İlhan at the FILA Golden Grand Prix held on July 8–10, 2011 in Baku, Azerbaijan.

He captured the gold medal at the Men's Wrestling FILA Freestyle World Cup 2013 held on February 21–22 in Tehran, Iran, having defeated such strong opponents as Soslan Ramonov, Ruslan Dibirgadjiyev.

Yakup Gör won the silver medal at the 2013 European Wrestling Championships held in Tbilisi, Georgia.

He competed in his first World Championships in 2013, participating in the 66 kg event. He defeated Steven Graf 8-0 in the first round, before losing to eventual World medalist Magomed Kurbanaliev on criteria after a 7-7 tie.

Yakup Gör won the silver medal at the 2019 Golden Grand Prix Ivan Yarygin held in Krasnoyarsk, Russia, after defeating 2016 World Champion Magomed Kurbanaliev.
