= Mostafa Hosseinkhani =

Iranian freestyle wrestler

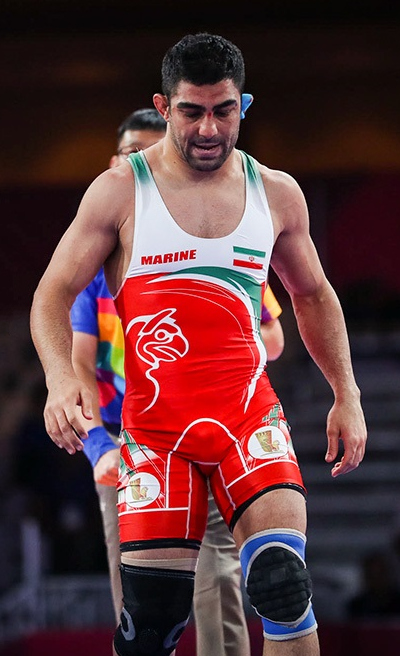
- Hosseinkhani at the 2018 Asian Games

Personal information
- Full name: Mostafa Hosseinkhani
- Nationality: Iranian
- Born: 27 March 1989 (age 37) Tehran, Iran
- Height: 1.72 m (5 ft 8 in)

Sport
- Country: Iran
- Sport: Freestyle wrestling
- Club: Khadem Wrestling Club
- Coached by: Rasoul Khadem
Medal record
Representing Iran
World Championships
Bronze medal – third place	2016 Budapest	70 Kg
Asian Championships
Gold medal – first place	2014 Astana	70 kg
Gold medal – first place	2016 Bangkok	74 kg
Silver medal – second place	2021 Almaty	74 kg
Bronze medal – third place	2018 Bishkek	74 kg
Bronze medal – third place	2020 New Delhi	74 kg
Islamic Solidarity Games
Gold medal – first place	2017 Baku	70 kg

Mostafa Hosseinkhani (Persian: مصطفی حسین‌خانی, born 27 March 1989) is an Iranian freestyle wrestler. He won gold medals at the 2014 and 2016 Asian Championships and bronze medals at the 2016 World and 2018 Asian Championships.

Hosseinkhani took up wrestling in 2000. He injured his left arm in April 2016 and failed to qualify for the 2016 Olympics. He competed in the men's 74 kg event at the 2020 Summer Olympics in Tokyo, Japan.
