= Austin Gomez =

Mexican-American wrestler (born 1998)

Personal information
- Full name: Austin Klee Gómez
- Born: March 19, 1998 (age 28) Carol Stream, Illinois, U.S.
- Height: 5 ft 6 in (168 cm)

Sport
- Country: United States (2013–2021); Mexico (2022–present)
- Sport: Wrestling
- Weight class: 65 kg (143 lb)
- Events: Freestyle and Folkstyle
- College team: Michigan Wolverines
- Club: Cliff Keen Wrestling Club
- Coached by: Sean Bormet
Medal record
Men's freestyle wrestling
Representing Mexico
Pan American Championships
Gold medal – first place	2025 Monterrey	70 kg
Grand Prix
Bronze medal – third place	2025 Zagreb	70 kg
Gold medal – first place	2022 Mexico City	70 kg
Mexico National Championships
Gold medal – first place	2023 Oaxaca	65 kg
Collegiate Wrestling
Representing the Michigan Wolverines
NCAA Division I Championships
Silver medal – second place	2024 Kansas City	149 lb
Big Ten Championships
Silver medal – second place	2024 College Park	149 lb
Representing the Wisconsin Badgers
Big Ten Championships
Gold medal – first place	2022 Lincoln	149 lb
Representing the Iowa State Cyclones
Big 12 Championships
Bronze medal – third place	2019 Tulsa	133 lb

Austin Klee Gómez (born March 19, 1998) is a Mexican-American freestyle and former folkstyle wrestler who competes at 65 kilograms. In freestyle, he represented Mexico at the 2024 Summer Olympics and is a Mexico National champion.

In folkstyle, Gomez was a two-time NCAA Division I All-American, placing second in 2024 out of the University of Michigan and fourth in 2022 out of the University of Wisconsin.

== Career ==
=== High school ===
Gomez started wrestling around the age of four years old, and went on to attend Glenbard North High School in Carol Stream, Illinois, where he became a three-time state champion before graduating in 2017. One of the top-recruits in the country, Gomez was a multiple-time U17 US National champion and a Pan American champion in both freestyle and Greco-Roman.

Before his junior season, Gomez committed to wrestle for the Iowa State Cyclones. Before going off to college, Gomez placed second at the U20 US World Team Trials.

=== Iowa State University ===
==== 2017–2018 ====
Gomez competed under a redshirt during his first season, grabbing titles from the Willie Myers Open, the Duhawk Open and the Sioux City Dave Edmonds Open and recording a 8–0 record.

After the season, Gomez grabbed the U20 US National title and improved from a runner-up finish from 2017 to a first-place finish at the U20 US World Team Trials in freestyle. However, he decided against competing at the U20 World Championships due to a knee injury.

==== 2018–2019 ====
During regular season, Gomez won the Lindenwood Open and placed second at the Southern Scuffle, before a third-place finish at the Big 12 Conference to qualify for the NCAA tournament. At the tournament, Gomez went 4–2 though was unable to place, closing off the year at 24–7.

==== 2019–2020 ====
Gomez was unable to compete during 2019–2020 due to injury, using a medical redshirt. In October 2020, Gomez competed at the US National Championships, where he suffered an injury in a first round loss and forfeited his next match. In December 2020, Gomez made the decision to retire from the sport due to recurrent concussions and injuries, at the age of 22.

=== University of Wisconsin ===
==== 2021–2022 ====
After a brief retirement, Gomez entered the transfer portal in April, and in May, he committed to wrestle for the Wisconsin Badgers. Up at 149 pounds, Gomez became the Big Ten Conference champion before becoming an All-American with a fourth-place finish at the NCAA National tournament, closing out the year at 23–4.

==== 2022–2023 ====
On November, Gomez competed for Mexico at the Mexico All-Star Grand Prix, winning gold at 70 kilograms and defeating Olympian Agustín Destribats in the finals.

During regular season, Gomez held a 10–2 dual meet record, notably defeating four-time NCAA champion Yianni Diakomihalis early in the year though suffering an injury during his last meet which resulted in a loss. After a first round upset loss, Gomez was forced to default out of his second match due to injury at the Big Ten Championships, though receiving an at-large berth to qualify for the NCAA tournament. At the national tournament, Gomez went 2–2 and was unable to repeat as an All-American, closing out the year at 12–6.

A week after folkstyle season was over, Gomez became a Mexico National champion, with notable victories over three-time Pan American medalist Brandon Díaz and Outstanding Wrestler honors. In May, Gomez competed at the Pan American Championships, but was eliminated by Colombia in the first round.

In September, Gomez competed at the World Championships, where after defeating India's Anuj Kumar, he was eliminated by two-time NCAA Division I National champion Nick Lee.

=== University of Michigan ===
==== 2023–2024 ====
After graduating from Wisconsin in the spring, Gomez announced 2022–2023 had been his final season of collegiate wrestling, however, he entered the transfer portal in October, and in December, his petition for another year of eligibility was approved by the NCAA. Days later, Gomez announced his commitment to the Michigan Wolverines, and went 7–1 in dual meets for them during regular season.

To start off March, Gomez switched to freestyle in an attempt to qualify Mexico for the 2024 Summer Olympics at the Pan American Olympic Qualification Tournament. After a quick victory over Chile, Gomez avenged his loss from the World Championships and defeated Pan American champion Nick Lee in a high-scoring match to advance to the qualification match. In the semifinals, Gomez defeated Lachlan McNeil to qualify for the 2024 Summer Olympics, and the finals of the tournament were not wrestled.

Back to folkstyle for the post-season, Gomez placed as a runner-up at the Big Ten Conference Championships and claimed the sixth-seed at the NCAA tournament. After defeating three-time All-American Kyle Parco to cruise to the finals, he fell to Caleb Henson to place as a runner-up and become a two-time All-American, closing out the year at 13–3 and ending his collegiate career.

=== Post-collegiate career ===
==== 2024 ====
In June, Gomez competed at the Polyák Imre & Varga János Ranking Series, where he won one match while losing three to place fifth.

In August, Gomez made his Olympic debut at the 2024 Summer Olympics in Paris, where he was eliminated in the first round by three-time World champion Haji Aliyev from Azerbaijan, who failed to advance in the tournament.

==== 2025 ====
Gomez opened up the year in February, racking up a bronze medal from the Grand Prix Zagreb Open up at 70 kilograms. He then competed against Bryce Andonian on February 26, at FloWrestling: Night in America, and defeated him by technical fall.

In May, after three victories over foreign opposition, Gomez claimed the gold medal at the Pan American Championships.

== Freestyle record ==
Senior Freestyle Matches
Res.	Record	Opponent	Score	Date	Event	Location
2026 Central American and Caribbean Games Qualifier (gold) at 74 kg
Win	27-10	(Dominican Republic) Julio Rodriguez Romero	INJ	December 5–7, 2025	2026 Central American and Caribbean Games Qualifier	Panama City, Panama
Win	26-10	(Colombia) Arbey Alarcon Tovar	TF 11–0	December 5–7, 2025	2026 Central American and Caribbean Games Qualifier	Panama City, Panama
Win	25-10	(Cuba) Orislandy Perdomo	5-0	December 5–7, 2025	2026 Central American and Caribbean Games Qualifier	Panama City, Panama
Win	24-10	(United States) Austin O'Connor	9-1	November 29, 2025	RAF 03	(United States) Chicago, Illinois
2025 World Championships 8th at 70kg
Loss	23-10	(Kazakhstan) Nurkozha Kaipanov	8-10	September 14, 2025	2025 World Championships	Zagreb, Croatia
Win	23-9	(Tunisia) Khairiddine Ben Tlili	TF 10–0	September 14, 2025	2025 World Championships	Zagreb, Croatia
Win	22-9	(Turkey) Haydar Yavuz	TF 13–2	September 14, 2025	2025 World Championships	Zagreb, Croatia
Win	21-9	(United States) Lance Palmer	TF 11–0	August 30, 2025	RAF 01 155 lb	(United States) Cleveland, Ohio
2025 Polyák Imre & Varga János Memorial Tournament 5th 70 kg
Loss		(Iran) Sina Khalili	FF	Jul 17–18, 2025	2025 Polyák Imre & Varga János Memorial Tournament	Budapest, Hungary
Loss	20–9	(Armenia) Arman Andreasyan	4–6	Jul 17–18, 2025	2025 Polyák Imre & Varga János Memorial Tournament	Budapest, Hungary
Win	20–8	(Hungary) Ismail Musukaev	TF 10–0	Jul 17–18, 2025	2025 Polyák Imre & Varga János Memorial Tournament	Budapest, Hungary
Win	19–8	(Kazakhstan) Meirzhan Ashirov	TF 10–0	Jul 17–18, 2025	2025 Polyák Imre & Varga János Memorial Tournament	Budapest, Hungary
2025 Pan American Championships (gold) at 70 kg
Win	18–8	(United States) Ian Parker	TF 11–0	May 11, 2025	2025 Pan American Championships	Monterrey, Mexico
Win	17–8	(Peru) Sixto Auccapiña	TF 10–0	May 11, 2025	2025 Pan American Championships	Monterrey, Mexico
Win	16–8	(Chile) Jorge Gatica	TF 12–0	May 11, 2025	2025 Pan American Championships	Monterrey, Mexico
Win	15–8	(United States) Bryce Andonian	TF 11–0	February 26, 2025	FloWrestling: Night in America – 72 kg	(United States) Coralville, Iowa
2025 Grand Prix Zagreb Open (bronze) at 70 kg
Win	14–8	(Iran) Ebrahim Elahi	9–3	February 5, 2025	2025 Grand Prix Zagreb Open	Zagreb, Croatia
Win		(Poland) Patryk Ołenczyn	FF	February 5, 2025	2025 Grand Prix Zagreb Open	Zagreb, Croatia
Loss	13–8	(Azerbaijan) Kanan Heybatov	5–9	February 5, 2025	2025 Grand Prix Zagreb Open	Zagreb, Croatia
2024 Summer Olympics 12th at 65 kg
Loss	13–7	(Azerbaijan) Haji Aliyev	0–7	August 8, 2024	2024 Summer Olympics	Paris, France
2024 Polyák Imre & Varga János Ranking Series 5th at 65 kg
Loss	13–6	(Azerbaijan) Haji Aliyev	3–12	June 6, 2024	2024 Polyák Imre & Varga János Memorial Tournament	Budapest, Hungary
Loss	13–5	(Japan) Kotaro Kiyooka	6–12	June 6, 2024	2024 Polyák Imre & Varga János Memorial Tournament	Budapest, Hungary
Win	13–4	(Hungary) György Szilágyi	TF 10–0	June 6, 2024	2024 Polyák Imre & Varga János Memorial Tournament	Budapest, Hungary
Loss	12–4	(Iran) Abbas Ebrahimzadeh	2–7	June 6, 2024	2024 Polyák Imre & Varga János Memorial Tournament	Budapest, Hungary
2024 Pan American Olympic Qualification (gold) at 65 kg
Win	12–3	(Canada) Lachlan McNeil	6–3	March 1, 2024	2024 Pan American Olympic Qualification Tournament	Acapulco, Mexico
Win	11–3	(United States) Nick Lee	TF 22–12	March 1, 2024	2024 Pan American Olympic Qualification Tournament	Acapulco, Mexico
Win	10–3	(Chile) Matias Muñoz	TF 10–0	March 1, 2024	2024 Pan American Olympic Qualification Tournament	Acapulco, Mexico
2023 World Championships 22nd at 65 kg
Loss	9–3	(United States) Nick Lee	Fall	September 18, 2023	2023 World Championships	Belgrade, Serbia
Win	9–2	(India) Anuj Kumar	8–7	September 18, 2023	2023 World Championships	Belgrade, Serbia
2023 Pan American Championships 18th at 65 kg
Loss	8–2	(Colombia) Uber Cuero	TF 0–11	May 3–6, 2023	2023 Pan American Continental Championships	Buenos Aires, Argentina
2023 Campeonato Nacional (gold) at 65 kg
Win	8–1	(Mexico) Brandon Díaz	TF 10–0	March 25, 2023	2023 Mexican Campeonato Nacional	Oaxaca, Mexico
Win	7–1	(Mexico)	TF 10–0	March 25, 2023	2023 Mexican Campeonato Nacional	Oaxaca, Mexico
Win	6–1	(Mexico) Carlos Lizarraga	TF 10–0	March 25, 2023	2023 Mexican Campeonato Nacional	Oaxaca, Mexico
Win	5–1	(Mexico) Brandon Díaz	TF 15–4	March 25, 2023	2023 Mexican Campeonato Nacional	Oaxaca, Mexico
Win	4–1	(Mexico) Diego Olvera	TF 12–2	March 25, 2023	2023 Mexican Campeonato Nacional	Oaxaca, Mexico
2022 All-Star Grand Prix (gold) at 70 kg
Win	3–1	(Argentina) Agustin Destribats	TF 14–4	November 22, 2022	2022 Mexico All-Star Grand Prix	Mexico City, Mexico
Win	2–1	(Mexico) Victor Dominguez	TF 10–0	November 22, 2022	2022 Mexico All-Star Grand Prix	Mexico City, Mexico
Win	1–1	(Mexico) Jesus Doroteo Rivas	Fall	November 22, 2022	2022 Mexico All-Star Grand Prix	Mexico City, Mexico
2020 US Nationals DNP at 65 kg
Loss		(United States) Michael Jaffe	FF	October 13, 2020	2020 US National Championships	(United States) Coralville, Iowa
Loss	0–1	(United States) Jaden Abas	TF 2–12	October 13, 2020	2020 US National Championships	(United States) Coralville, Iowa
