= Wrestling at the 2026 Asian Games – Men's freestyle 74 kg =

Men's freestyle 74 kg at the 2026 Asian Games
- Venue: Inae Sports Center
- Date: 3 October 2026
- Competitors: 14 from 14 nations

Medalists
| gold medal | Younes Emami | Iran |
| silver medal | Yoshinosuke Aoyagi | Japan |
| bronze medal | Viktor Rassadin | Tajikistan |
| bronze medal | Nurkozha Kaipanov | Kazakhstan |

The men's 74 kilograms freestyle wrestling competition at the 2026 Asian Games was held on 3 October 2026 at the Inae Sports Center in Nagoya. The event was competed by 14 competitors. Younes Emami of Iran won the gold medal after defeating Yoshinosuke Aoyagi of Japan in the final. Viktor Rassadin of Tajikistan and Nurkozha Kaipanov of Kazakhstan won the bronze medals.

== Background ==
Men's freestyle wrestling was first contested at the 1954 Asian Games in Manila. It has been contested at every edition of the Asian Games since then.

Uzbekistan's Razambek Zhamalov was the reigning Olympic champion, having won the gold medal in the men's freestyle 74 kg category at the 2024 Summer Olympics in Paris. Iran's Younes Emami was the defending champion, having won the gold medal in the men's freestyle 74 kg event at the 2022 Asian Games in Hangzhou. He was also a two-time World Championships bronze medallist, having finished third in the 70 kg category in 2019 and the 74 kg category in 2022. Japan's Yoshinosuke Aoyagi was the world champion in the 70 kg category, having won the gold medal in the 2025 World Championships. He won the gold medal in the 74 kg category at the at the 2026 Asian Championships at Bishkek in April 2026.

Kazakhstan's Nurkozha Kaipanov won the gold medal in the 70 kg event at the 2024 World Championships and the 74 kg title at the 2025 Asian Wrestling Championships. He is a three time Asian Champion. Tajikistan's Viktor Rassadin is a two-time Asian silver medalist and finished fifth at the 2024 Summer Olympics. India was represented by Sagar Jaglan, who had won a silver medal in the 79 kg event at the Under-20 World Championships in Amman in 2023.

== Format ==
The freestyle wrestling competition was competed as a single-elimination tournament. The two finalists competed against each other for the gold and silver medals. Each wrestler who loses to one of the two finalists moves into the repechage rounds, which is used to determine the bronze medals. The losers of the semifinals compete against the remaining repechage opponent from their half of the bracket in the bronze medal bout.

== Schedule ==
The men's freestyle 74 kg event was held on 3 October 2026 held at the Inae Sports Center in Nagoya.

All times are Japan Standard Time (UTC+09:00)

Schedule
| Date | Time | Event |
|---|---|---|
| Saturday, 3 October 2026 | 10:30 | 1/8 finals |
| Saturday, 3 October 2026 | 10:30 | 1/4 finals |
| Saturday, 3 October 2026 | 10:30 | Semifinals |
| Saturday, 3 October 2026 | 10:30 | Repechages |
| Saturday, 3 October 2026 | 18:00 | Finals |

== Summary ==
Emami defeated Olympic champion Zhamalov in the first round and set up a clash with Aoyagi in the finals after overcoming Kaipanov in the semifinals. Aoyagi reached the final after three consecutive victories by technical superiority, including two of the matches which ended within a minute. Aoyagi initially took a five point lead, but Emami reduced the deficit by two points at the end of the first period. In the second period, Emami scored seven consecutive points to complete the comeback and win the bout. Thus, Emami successfully defended his Asian Games title, while Aoyagi settled for the silver medal.

Kaipanov and Rassadin won the two bronze medals. Rassadin defeated Orozobek Toktomambetov in his bronze-medal bout, while Kaipanov defeated Jaglan by fall to claim the other bronze medal. Jaglan, who had lost to Emami, subsequently defeated Zhamalov in the repechage, but lost to Kaipanov in the bronze medal bout.

== Results ==
Legend

- F — Won by fall

=== Main bracket ===
1/8 finals
Lu Feng (CHN) | 2
Orozobek Toktomambetov (KGZ) | 9
Viktor Rassadin (TJK) | 3
Magomedrasul Asluev (BRN) | 2
Yoshinosuke Aoyagi (JPN) | 10
Gilang Ilhaza (INA) | 0
Razambek Zhamalov (UZB) | 6
Younes Emami (IRI) | 7
Sagar Jaglan (IND) | 8
Tömör-Ochiryn Tulga (MGL) | 1
Inayat Ullah (PAK) | 2
Nurkozha Kaipanov (KAZ) | 12

1/4 finals
Suresh Chunara (NEP) | 0
Orozobek Toktomambetov (KGZ) | 10
Viktor Rassadin (TJK) | 0
Yoshinosuke Aoyagi (JPN) | 10
Younes Emami (IRI) | 10
Sagar Jaglan (IND) | 0
Nurkozha Kaipanov (KAZ) | 11
Han Dae-gil (KOR) | 0

Semifinals
Orozobek Toktomambetov (KGZ) | 0
Yoshinosuke Aoyagi (JPN) | 10
Younes Emami (IRI) | 4
Nurkozha Kaipanov (KAZ) | 2

Final
Yoshinosuke Aoyagi (JPN) | 5
Younes Emami (IRI) | 9

=== Repechage ===
Repechage
Gilang Ilhaza (INA) | 0
Viktor Rassadin (TJK) | 10
Razambek Zhamalov (UZB) | 3
Sagar Jaglan (IND) | 7

Bronze medal matches
Viktor Rassadin (TJK) | 4
Orozobek Toktomambetov (KGZ) | 3
Sagar Jaglan (IND) | 0
Nurkozha Kaipanov (KAZ) | 5^{F}

== Final standing ==
| Rank | Athlete |
|---|---|
| 1st place, gold medalist(s) | Younes Emami (IRI) |
| 2nd place, silver medalist(s) | Yoshinosuke Aoyagi (JPN) |
| 3rd place, bronze medalist(s) | Viktor Rassadin (TJK) |
| 3rd place, bronze medalist(s) | Nurkozha Kaipanov (KAZ) |
| 5 | Orozobek Toktomambetov (KGZ) |
| 5 | Sagar Jaglan (IND) |
| 7 | Razambek Zhamalov (UZB) |
| 8 | Magomedrasul Asluev (BRN) |
| 9 | Lu Feng (CHN) |
| 10 | Inayat Ullah (PAK) |
| 11 | Tömör-Ochiryn Tulga (MGL) |
| 12 | Suresh Chunara (NEP) |
| 13 | Han Dae-gil (KOR) |
| 14 | Gilang Ilhaza (INA) |
