= 2024 World Wrestling Championships – Men's freestyle 70 kg =

Wrestling competitions

Men's freestyle 70 kg at the 2024 World Championships
- Venue: Tirana Olympic Park
- Dates: 30–31 October 2024
- Competitors: 25 from 23 nations

Medalists
| gold medal | Nurkozha Kaipanov | Kazakhstan |
| silver medal | Yoshinosuke Aoyagi | Japan |
| bronze medal | Inalbek Sheriev |
| bronze medal | Abdulmazhid Kudiev | Tajikistan |

The men's freestyle 70 kilograms is a competition featured at the 2024 World Wrestling Championships, and was held in Tirana, Albania on 30 and 31 October.

This freestyle wrestling competition consists of a single-elimination tournament, with a repechage used to determine the winner of two bronze medals. The two finalists face off for gold and silver medals. Each wrestler who loses to one of the two finalists moves into the repechage, culminating in a pair of bronze medal matches, featuring the semifinal losers each facing the remaining repechage opponent from their half of the bracket.

Each bout consists of a single round within a six-minute limit, including two halves of three minutes. The wrestler who scores more points is the winner.

Nurkozha Kaipanov from Kazakhstan won the gold medal. He became the second Kazakh male freestyle wrestler to win a World Championship title.

== Results ==
Legend

- F — Won by fall

=== Final ===
| Final |
| Yoshinosuke Aoyagi (JPN) | 3 |
| Nurkozha Kaipanov (KAZ) | 5 |

=== Top half ===
Round of 32
Ștefan Coman (ROU) | 1
Eriglent Prizreni (ALB) | 8
Kizhan Clarke (GER) | 0
Inalbek Sheriev (AIN) | 10
Manish Goswami (IND) | 0
Kanan Heybatov (AZE) | 10
Vasyl Shuptar (UKR) | 10
Patryk Ołenczyn (POL) | 6
Yasin Yeşil (TUR) | 3
Zhou Shijian (CHN) | 3

Round of 16
Arman Andreasyan (ARM) | 7
Eriglent Prizreni (ALB) | 2
Inalbek Sheriev (AIN) | 13
Kanan Heybatov (AZE) | 2
Fati Vejseli (MKD) | 0
Vasyl Shuptar (UKR) | 6^{F}
Yasin Yeşil (TUR) | 0
Yoshinosuke Aoyagi (JPN) | 11

Quarterfinals
Arman Andreasyan (ARM) | 0
Inalbek Sheriev (AIN) | 2
Vasyl Shuptar (UKR) | 2
Yoshinosuke Aoyagi (JPN) | 12

Semifinals
Inalbek Sheriev (AIN) | 1
Yoshinosuke Aoyagi (JPN) | 6

=== Bottom half ===
Round of 32
Peiman Biabani (CAN) | 2
James Green (USA) | 5
Mitch Finesilver (ISR) | 0
Nurkozha Kaipanov (KAZ) | 9
Sina Khalili (IRI) | 10
Niurgun Skriabin (AIN) | 0
Enkhtuyaagiin Temüülen (MGL) | 0
Abdulmazhid Kudiev (TJK) | 11

Round of 16
Akaki Kemertelidze (GEO) | 10
James Green (USA) | 4
Nurkozha Kaipanov (KAZ) | 14
Nicolai Grahmez (MDA) | 2
Alibek Osmonov (KGZ) | 0
Sina Khalili (IRI) | 10
Abdulmazhid Kudiev (TJK) | 12^{F}
Ramazan Ramazanov (BUL) | 2

Quarterfinals
Akaki Kemertelidze (GEO) | 2
Nurkozha Kaipanov (KAZ) | 12
Sina Khalili (IRI) | 5
Abdulmazhid Kudiev (TJK) | 6

Semifinals
Nurkozha Kaipanov (KAZ) | 13
Abdulmazhid Kudiev (TJK) | 2

=== Repechage ===
Repechage round 1
Mitch Finesilver (ISR) | 11
Nicolai Grahmez (MDA) | 0

Repechage round 2
Yasin Yeşil (TUR) | 1
Vasyl Shuptar (UKR) | 5
Mitch Finesilver (ISR) | 1
Akaki Kemertelidze (GEO) | 8

Bronze medals
Vasyl Shuptar (UKR) | 0
Inalbek Sheriev (AIN) | 10
Akaki Kemertelidze (GEO) | 2
Abdulmazhid Kudiev (TJK) | 13

== Final standing ==
| Rank | Athlete |
|---|---|
| 1st place, gold medalist(s) | Nurkozha Kaipanov (KAZ) |
| 2nd place, silver medalist(s) | Yoshinosuke Aoyagi (JPN) |
| 3rd place, bronze medalist(s) | Inalbek Sheriev (AIN) |
| 3rd place, bronze medalist(s) | Abdulmazhid Kudiev (TJK) |
| 5 | Vasyl Shuptar (UKR) |
| 5 | Akaki Kemertelidze (GEO) |
| 7 | Sina Khalili (IRI) |
| 8 | Kanan Heybatov (AZE) |
| 9 | Mitch Finesilver (ISR) |
| 10 | Eriglent Prizreni (ALB) |
| 11 | James Green (USA) |
| 12 | Yasin Yeşil (TUR) |
| 13 | Arman Andreasyan (ARM) |
| 14 | Patryk Ołenczyn (POL) |
| 15 | Zhou Shijian (CHN) |
| 16 | Peiman Biabani (CAN) |
| 17 | Nicolai Grahmez (MDA) |
| 18 | Ștefan Coman (ROU) |
| 19 | Ramazan Ramazanov (BUL) |
| 20 | Fati Vejseli (MKD) |
| 21 | Alibek Osmonov (KGZ) |
| 22 | Kizhan Clarke (GER) |
| 23 | Manish Goswami (IND) |
| 24 | Niurgun Skriabin (AIN) |
| 25 | Enkhtuyaagiin Temüülen (MGL) |
