= 2025 World Wrestling Championships – Men's freestyle 70 kg =

Wrestling competitions

Men's freestyle 70 kg at the 2025 World Championships
- Venue: Arena Zagreb
- Dates: 13–14 September 2025
- Competitors: 29 from 28 nations

Medalists
gold medal	Yoshinosuke Aoyagi	Japan
silver medal	Tömör-Ochiryn Tulga	Mongolia
bronze medal	Ernazar Akmataliev	Kyrgyzstan
bronze medal	Nurkozha Kaipanov	Kazakhstan

The men's freestyle 70 kilograms is a competition featured at the 2025 World Wrestling Championships, and was held in Zagreb, Croatia on 13 and 14 September 2025.

This freestyle wrestling competition consists of a single-elimination tournament, with a repechage used to determine the winner of two bronze medals. The two finalists face off for gold and silver medals. Each wrestler who loses to one of the two finalists moves into the repechage, culminating in a pair of bronze medal matches, featuring the semifinal losers each facing the remaining repechage opponent from their half of the bracket.

== Results ==
Legend

- F — Won by fall
- WO — Won by walkover

=== Final ===
Final
Yoshinosuke Aoyagi (JPN)	5
Tömör-Ochiryn Tulga (MGL)	1

=== Top half ===
Round of 32
Jorge Gatica (CHI)	0
Ernazar Akmataliev (KGZ)	10
Saiyn Kazyryk (UWW)	8^{F}
Oleksii Boruta (UKR)	2
Islam Dudaev (ALB)	1
Iszmail Muszukajev (HUN)	1
Arman Andreasyan (ARM)	5
Viktor Rassadin (TJK)	5
Viktor Voinović (SRB)	4
Mohammed Al-Jawad (IRQ)	2
~~Anthony Wesley (CPV)~~
Shannon Hanna (BAH)	WO
Amir Mohammad Yazdani (IRI)	4
Kanan Heybatov (AZE)	15

Round of 16
Yoshinosuke Aoyagi (JPN)	11
Ernazar Akmataliev (KGZ)	0
Saiyn Kazyryk (UWW)	2
Iszmail Muszukajev (HUN)	4
Arman Andreasyan (ARM)	4
Viktor Voinović (SRB)	1
Shannon Hanna (BAH)	0
Kanan Heybatov (AZE)	10

Quarterfinals
Yoshinosuke Aoyagi (JPN)	10
Iszmail Muszukajev (HUN)	0
Arman Andreasyan (ARM)	8
Kanan Heybatov (AZE)	6

Semifinals
Yoshinosuke Aoyagi (JPN)	8
Arman Andreasyan (ARM)	0

=== Bottom half ===
Round of 32
Chen Shuang (CHN)	0
PJ Duke (USA)	11
Khairiddine Ben Tlili (TUN)	14
Jeong Yong-seok (KOR)	4
Haydar Yavuz (TUR)	2
Austin Gómez (MEX)	13
Vasile Diacon (MDA)	0
Tömör-Ochiryn Tulga (MGL)	2
Mike Zale (CAN)	0
Mihail Georgiev (BUL)	10
Rohit Singh (IND)	4
Begijon Kuldashev (UZB)	5

Round of 16
Nurkozha Kaipanov (KAZ)	11
PJ Duke (USA)	7
Khairiddine Ben Tlili (TUN)	0
Austin Gómez (MEX)	10
Tömör-Ochiryn Tulga (MGL)	7^{F}
Mihail Georgiev (BUL)	1
Begijon Kuldashev (UZB)	0
Akaki Kemertelidze (GEO)	4

Quarterfinals
Nurkozha Kaipanov (KAZ)	10
Austin Gómez (MEX)	8
Tömör-Ochiryn Tulga (MGL)	11
Akaki Kemertelidze (GEO)	0

Semifinals
Nurkozha Kaipanov (KAZ)	2
Tömör-Ochiryn Tulga (MGL)	5

=== Repechage ===
Repechage round 1
Vasile Diacon (MDA)	5
Mihail Georgiev (BUL)	2

Repechage round 2
Ernazar Akmataliev (KGZ)	14
Iszmail Muszukajev (HUN)	4
Vasile Diacon (MDA)	3
Akaki Kemertelidze (GEO)	2

Bronze medals
Ernazar Akmataliev (KGZ)	8
Arman Andreasyan (ARM)	2
Vasile Diacon (MDA)	2
Nurkozha Kaipanov (KAZ)	13

== Final standing ==
Rank	Athlete
1st place, gold medalist(s)	Yoshinosuke Aoyagi (JPN)
2nd place, silver medalist(s)	Tömör-Ochiryn Tulga (MGL)
3rd place, bronze medalist(s)	Ernazar Akmataliev (KGZ)
3rd place, bronze medalist(s)	Nurkozha Kaipanov (KAZ)
5	Arman Andreasyan (ARM)
5	Vasile Diacon (MDA)
7	Kanan Heybatov (AZE)
8	Austin Gómez (MEX)
9	Iszmail Muszukajev (HUN)
10	Saiyn Kazyryk (UWW)
11	PJ Duke (USA)
12	Mihail Georgiev (BUL)
13	Shannon Hanna (BAH)
14	Khairiddine Ben Tlili (TUN)
15	Akaki Kemertelidze (GEO)
16	Viktor Voinović (SRB)
17	Begijon Kuldashev (UZB)
18	Viktor Rassadin (TJK)
19	Rohit Singh (IND)
20	Jeong Yong-seok (KOR)
21	Amir Mohammad Yazdani (IRI)
22	Mohammed Al-Jawad (IRQ)
23	Haydar Yavuz (TUR)
24	Islam Dudaev (ALB)
25	Oleksii Boruta (UKR)
26	Jorge Gatica (CHI)
27	Mike Zale (CAN)
28	Chen Shuang (CHN)
—	Anthony Wesley (CPV)
