= Younes Emami =

Iranian freestyle wrestler

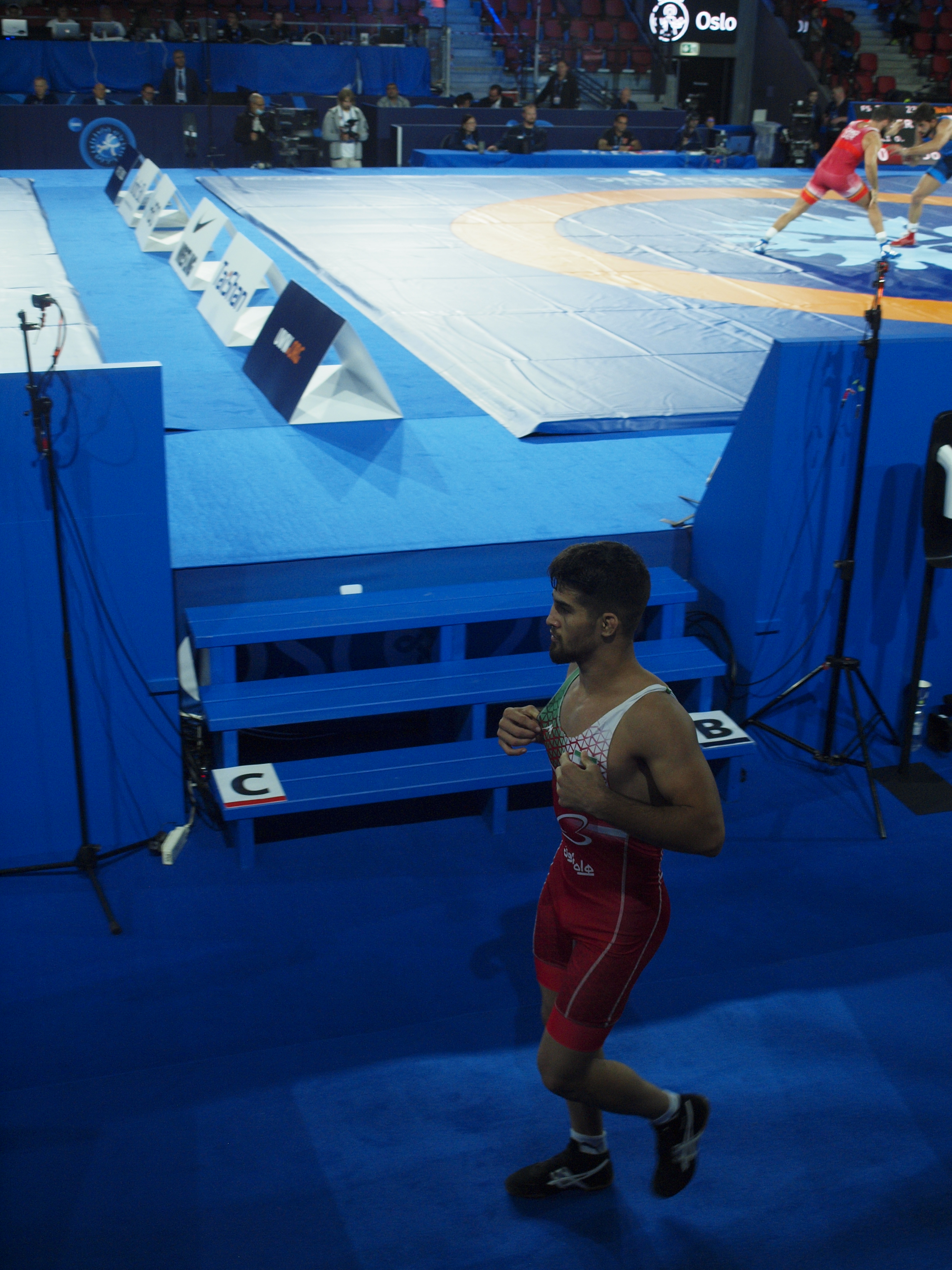

Personal information
- Full name: Younes Emami Choghaei
- Nationality: Iran
- Born: 30 March 1997 (age 29) Dehvand, Delfan County, Iran
- Height: 175 cm (5 ft 9 in)

Sport
- Country: Iran
- Sport: Wrestling
- Weight class: 74 kg
- Event: Freestyle
- Coached by: Taghi Akbarnejad; Gholamreza Mohammadi; Pejman Dorostkar
Medal record
Men's freestyle wrestling
Representing Iran
World Championships
Bronze medal – third place	2019 Nur-Sultan	70 kg
Bronze medal – third place	2022 Belgrade	74 kg
Asian Games
Gold medal – first place	2022 Hangzhou	74 kg
Gold medal – first place	2026 Aichi–Nagoya	74 kg
Asian Championships
Gold medal – first place	2022 Ulaanbaatar	74 kg
Bronze medal – third place	2019 Xi'an	70 kg
Islamic Solidarity Games
Gold medal – first place	2025 Riyadh	74 kg
Grand Prix
Gold medal – first place	2022 Tunisia	74 kg
Gold medal – first place	2025 Ulaanbaatar	74 kg
Gold medal – first place	2026 Tirana	74 kg
Silver medal – second place	2023 Zagreb	74 kg
Bronze medal – third place	2025 Tirana	74 kg
World U23 Championships
Bronze medal – third place	2017 Bydgoszcz	65 kg
World Junior Championships
Bronze medal – third place	2017 Tampere	60 kg
Asian Junior Championships
Silver medal – second place	2017 Taichung	60 kg
World Cadets Championships
Silver medal – second place	2013 Zrenjanin	42 kg
Asian Cadets Championships
Bronze medal – third place	2013 Ulaanbaatar	42 kg

Younes Emami Choghaei (Persian: یونس امامی چقایی, born 30 March 1997 in Dehvand), is an Iranian wrestler. He won two Bronze medal at the 2019 and 2022 World Wrestling Championships.

He won the gold medal in the men's 74 kg event at the 2022 Asian Games held in Hangzhou, China.

He competed at the 2024 Asian Wrestling Olympic Qualification Tournament in Bishkek, Kyrgyzstan and he earned a quota place for Iran for the 2024 Summer Olympics in Paris, France.
