= Inalbek Sheriev =

Russian freestyle wrestler (born 2003)

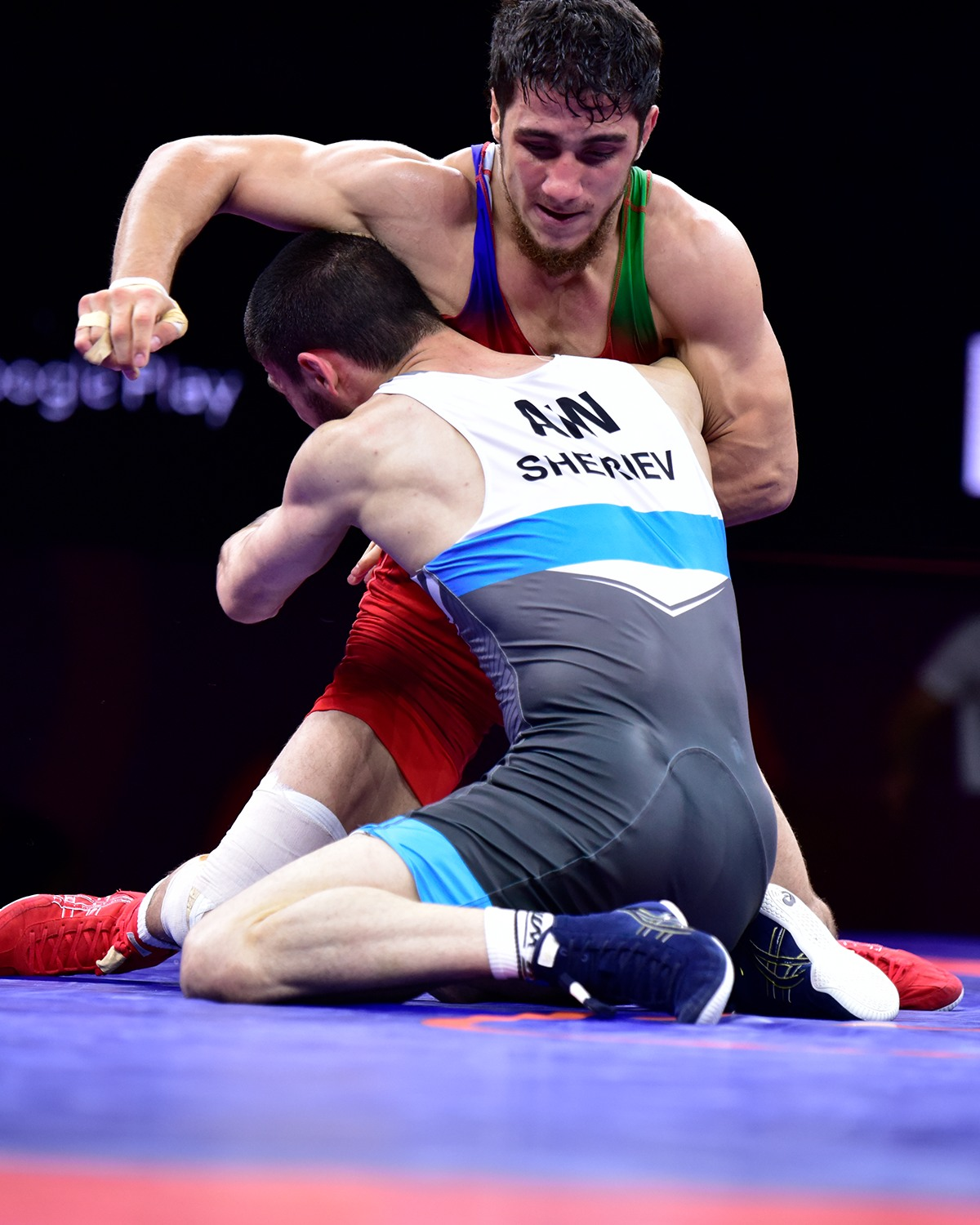

Personal information
- Full name: Inalbek Aslanovich Sheriev
- National team: Russia
- Born: 18 January 2003 (age 23) Kabardino-Balkaria, Russia
- Height: 1.77 m (5 ft 10 in)

Sport
- Country: Russia
- Sport: Amateur wrestling
- Weight class: 70 kg (150 lb; 11 st)
- Event: Freestyle
- Coached by: Anzor Urishev

Achievements and titles
- World finals: (gold) (2026) (bronze) (2024)
- National finals: (gold) (2024)
Medal record
Men's freestyle wrestling
Representing UWW
Grand Prix
Bronze medal – third place	2026 Tirana	74 kg
Representing Individual Neutral Athletes
World Championships
Bronze medal – third place	2024 Tirana	70 kg
World U23 Championships
Gold medal – first place	2023 Tirana	70 kg
European U23 Championships
Gold medal – first place	2024 Baku	70 kg
Bronze medal – third place	2021 Skopje	70 kg
Representing Russia
Gold medal – first place	2026 Astana	74 kg
World Cadets Championships
Silver medal – second place	2018 Zagreb	65 kg
Representing Moscow Oblast
Golden Grand Prix Ivan Yarygin
Silver medal – second place	2024 Krasnoyarsk	70 kg
Bronze medal – third place	2026 Krasnoyarsk	74 kg
Russian Championships
Gold medal – first place	2024 Novoivanovskoye	70 kg
Silver medal – second place	2023 Kaspiysk	70 kg
Representing Kabardino-Balkaria
Golden Grand Prix Ivan Yarygin
Silver medal – second place	2023 Krasnoyarsk	70 kg

Inalbek Sheriev (Russian: Иналбек Асланович Шериев; born 18 January 2003) is a Russian freestyle wrestler of Kabardian Circassian origin who currently competes at 70 kilograms.

== Wrestling career ==
Cherkess, a native of Kabardino-Balkaria. He is a student of SSOR in the village of Deyskoye. At the beginning of June 2018 in Moscow, he won the Russian Under-18 Championship. On 3 July 2018 in Zagreb in the final of the World Youth Championship he lost to Turan Bayramov from Azerbaijan.

On 27 September 2019, he was awarded the title of Master of Sports of Russia.

On 2 December 2020, he won the Russian Junior Championship in Smolensk, defeating Alexander Baltuev from Irkutsk in the final.

In mid May 2021 in Skopje, Sheriev won a bronze medal at the European Championships among athletes under 23 years old in the weight category up to 70 kg, defeating Giorgi Elbakidze from Georgia in the bout for third place with a score of 8:2.

In May 2024, he won the Russian 70 kg championship for the first time.

At the 2024 World Wrestling Championships in Tirana, Albania, he defeated German Kizhan Clarke 10–0 in the first round, Azerbaijani Kanan Heybatov 13–2 with technical superiority in the second round, Armenian Arman Andreasyan 2–0 in the quarter-finals and reached the semi-finals. He lost 6–1 to Japanese Yoshinosuke Aoyagi in the semi-final. In the bronze medal match, he defeated Ukrainian Vasyl Shuptar with 10-0 technical superiority and won the bronze medal.
