= 2026 European Wrestling Championships – Men's freestyle 70 kg =

Wrestling competition

Men's freestyle 70 kg at the 2026 European Wrestling Championships
- Venue: Tirana Olympic Park
- Location: Tirana, Albania
- Dates: 24-25 April
- Competitors: 14

Medalists
gold medal	David Baev
silver medal	Alexandr Gaidarli	Moldova
bronze medal	Ismail Musukaev	Hungary
bronze medal	Akaki Kemertelidze	Georgia

The men's freestyle 70 kg is a competition featured at the 2026 European Wrestling Championships, and was held in Tirana, Albania on April 24 and 25.

== Results ==
Legend

- F — Won by fall

=== Main bracket ===
Round of 16
Remzi Temur (TUR)	9
Muhamed Feruki (MKD)	2
Mikyay Naim (BUL)	0
Alexandr Gaidarli (MDA)	10
Benjamin Boejthe (ROU)	0
Patryk Ołenczyn (POL)	4^{F}
Akaki Kemertelidze (GEO)	11
Muhammad Abdurachmanov (BEL)	0
David Baev (UWW)	9
Georgii Koliev (UWW)	0
Oleksii Boruta (UKR)	6
Davit Margaryan (ARM)	3

Quarterfinals
Ismail Musukaev (HUN)	10
Remzi Temur (TUR)	0
Alexandr Gaidarli (MDA)	12
Patryk Ołenczyn (POL)	2
Akaki Kemertelidze (GEO)	3
David Baev (UWW)	11
Oleksii Boruta (UKR)	7
Kanan Heybatov (AZE)	2

Semifinals
Ismail Musukaev (HUN)	0
Alexandr Gaidarli (MDA)	11
David Baev (UWW)	9
Oleksii Boruta (UKR)	2

Final
Alexandr Gaidarli (MDA)	1
David Baev (UWW)	2

=== Repechage ===
Repechage round 1
Mikyay Naim (BUL)	7
Patryk Ołenczyn (POL)	3
Georgii Koliev (UWW)	0
Akaki Kemertelidze (GEO)	4

Bronze medal match
Mikyay Naim (BUL)	0
Ismail Musukaev (HUN)	10
Akaki Kemertelidze (GEO)	4
Oleksii Boruta (UKR)	0

== Final standing ==
Rank	Athlete
1st place, gold medalist(s)	David Baev (UWW)
2nd place, silver medalist(s)	Alexandr Gaidarli (MDA)
3rd place, bronze medalist(s)	Ismail Musukaev (HUN)
3rd place, bronze medalist(s)	Akaki Kemertelidze (GEO)
5	Mikyay Naim (BUL)
5	Oleksii Boruta (UKR)
7	Patryk Ołenczyn (POL)
8	Remzi Temur (TUR)
9	Davit Margaryan (ARM)
10	Kanan Heybatov (AZE)
11	Muhamed Feruki (MKD)
12	Benjamin Boejthe (ROU)
13	Muhammad Abdurachmanov (BEL)
14	George Koliev (UWW)
