= 2024 European Wrestling Championships – Men's freestyle 70 kg =

Wrestling competition

Men's freestyle 70 kg at the 2024 European Wrestling Championships
- Venue: Polyvalent Hall
- Location: Bucharest, Romania
- Dates: 16-17 February
- Competitors: 17

Medalists
gold medal	Arman Andreasyan	Armenia
silver medal	Akaki Kemertelidze	Georgia
bronze medal	Ramazan Ramazanov	Bulgaria
bronze medal	Ismail Musukaev	Hungary

The men's freestyle 70 kg is a competition featured at the 2024 European Wrestling Championships, and was held in Bucharest, Romania on February 16 and 17.

== Results ==
Legend

- F — Won by fall

=== Final ===
Final
Akaki Kemertelidze (GEO)	3
Arman Andreasyan (ARM)	7

=== Top half ===
Round of 32
Kanan Heybatov (AZE)	5
George Bucur (ROU)	1

Round of 16
Ramazan Ramazanov (BUL)	6
Fati Vejseli (MKD)	5
Kanan Heybatov (AZE)	4
Israil Kasumov (AIN)	3
Haydar Yavuz (TUR)	7
Oleksii Boruta (UKR)	6
Uladzislau Koika (AIN)	0
Akaki Kemertelidze (GEO)	11

Quarterfinals
Ramazan Ramazanov (BUL)	9
Kanan Heybatov (AZE)	5
Haydar Yavuz (TUR)	4
Akaki Kemertelidze (GEO)	7

Semifinals
Ramazan Ramazanov (BUL)	2
Akaki Kemertelidze (GEO)	5

=== Bottom half ===
Round of 32

Round of 16
Marc Dietsche (SUI)	6
Gianluca Talamo (ITA)	5
Egzon Xhoni (KOS)	0
Ismail Musukaev (HUN)	11
Seyfulla Itaev (FRA)	4
Nicolai Grahmez (MDA)	2
Alexander Semisorow (GER)	1
Arman Andreasyan (ARM)	3

Quarterfinals
Marc Dietsche (SUI)	0
Ismail Musukaev (HUN)	10
Seyfulla Itaev (FRA)	5
Arman Andreasyan (ARM)	6

Semifinals
Ismail Musukaev (HUN)	5
Arman Andreasyan (ARM)	8

=== Repechage ===
Repechage round 2
Uladzislau Koika (AIN)	2
Haydar Yavuz (TUR)	12
Alexander Semisorow (GER)	2
Seyfulla Itaev (FRA)	5^{F}

Bronze medal match
Haydar Yavuz (TUR)	3
Ramazan Ramazanov (BUL)	11
Seyfulla Itaev (FRA)	1
Ismail Musukaev (HUN)	2

== Final standing ==
Rank	Athlete
1st place, gold medalist(s)	Arman Andreasyan (ARM)
2nd place, silver medalist(s)	Akaki Kemertelidze (GEO)
3rd place, bronze medalist(s)	Ramazan Ramazanov (BUL)
3rd place, bronze medalist(s)	Ismail Musukaev (HUN)
5	Haydar Yavuz (TUR)
5	Seyfulla Itaev (FRA)
7	Kanan Heybatov (AZE)
8	Marc Dietsche (SUI)
9	Oleksii Boruta (UKR)
10	Fati Vejseli (MKD)
11	Gianluca Talamo (ITA)
12	Israil Kasumov (AIN)
13	Alexander Semisorow (GER)
14	Nicolai Grahmez (MDA)
15	Uladzislau Koika (AIN)
16	George Bucur (ROU)
17	Egzon Xhoni (KOS)
