= Nurkozha Kaipanov =

Kazakhstani freestyle wrestler

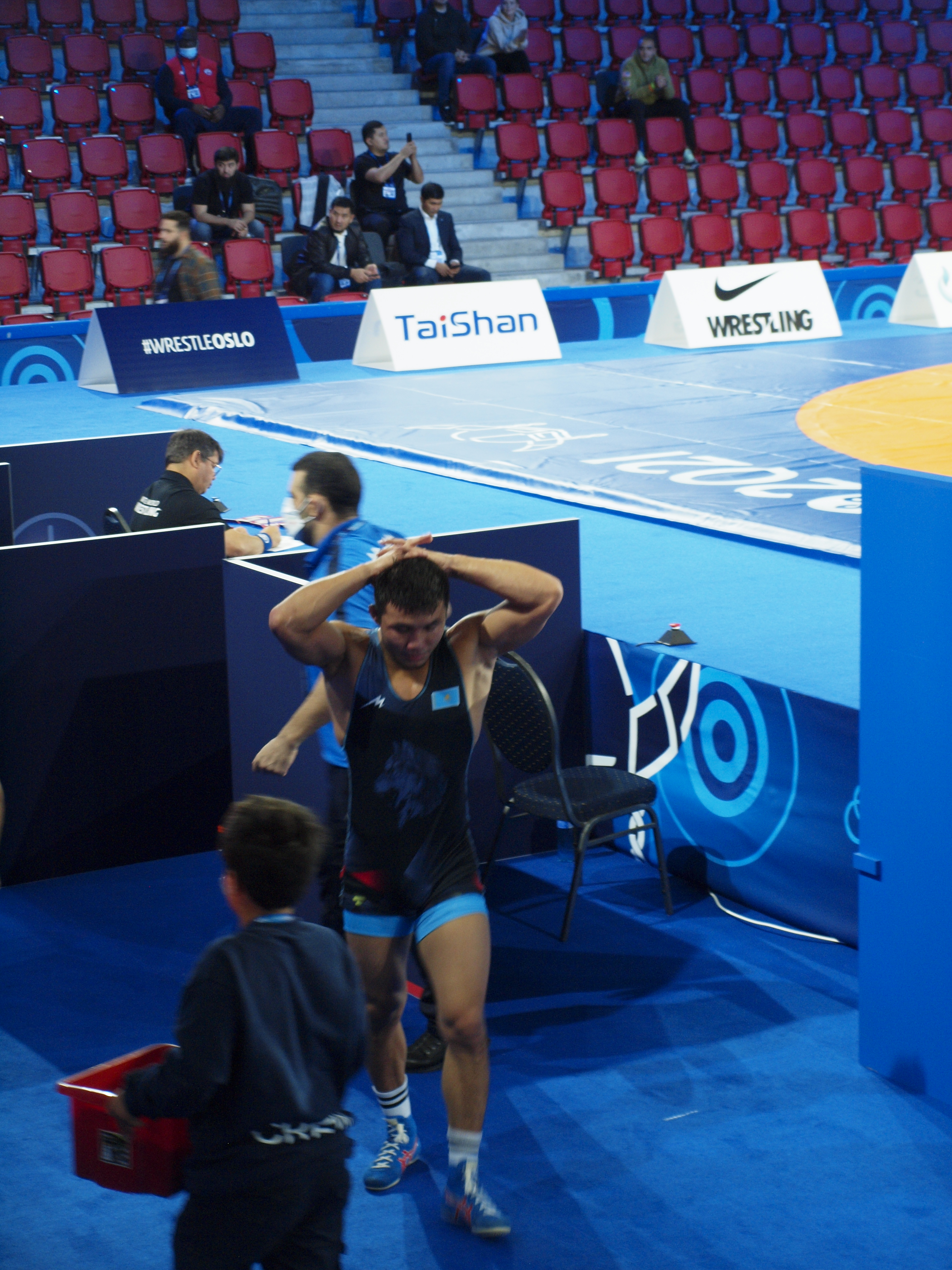

Personal information
- Native name: Нұрқожа Аралбекұлы Қайпанов
- Full name: Nurkozha Aralbekovich Kaipanov
- Nationality: Kazakhstan
- Born: 21 June 1998 (age 28) Petropavl, Kazakhstan
- Height: 172 cm (5 ft 8 in)

Sport
- Country: Kazakhstan
- Sport: Amateur wrestling
- Weight class: 74 kg
- Event: Freestyle
Medal record
Men's freestyle wrestling
Representing Kazakhstan
World Championships
Gold medal – first place	2024 Tirana	70 kg
Silver medal – second place	2019 Nur-Sultan	70 kg
Silver medal – second place	2026 Astana	74 kg
Bronze medal – third place	2025 Zagreb	70 kg
Asian Games
Bronze medal – third place	2026 Aichi–Nagoya	74 kg
Asian Championships
Gold medal – first place	2019 Xi'an	70 kg
Gold medal – first place	2021 Almaty	74 kg
Gold medal – first place	2025 Amman	74 kg
Silver medal – second place	2022 Ulaanbaatar	74 kg
Military World Games
Silver medal – second place	2019 Wuhan	74 kg
Yasar Dogu Tournament
Gold medal – first place	2025 Kocaeli	74 kg
Grand Prix
Gold medal – first place	2019 Sassari	70 kg
Gold medal – first place	2022 Taraz	74 kg
Silver medal – second place	2018 Taraz	70 kg
Silver medal – second place	2019 Warsaw	70 kg
Silver medal – second place	2023 Budapest	74 kg
Bronze medal – third place	2022 Almaty	74 kg
Bronze medal – third place	2021 Rome	74 kg
Asian Juniors Championships
Bronze medal – third place	2018 New Delhi	70 kg

Nurkozha Kaipanov (born 21 June 1998) is a Kazakh freestyle wrestler. He is a three-time medalist, including gold, at the World Wrestling Championships and a three-time gold medalist at the Asian Wrestling Championships.

== Career ==
In 2019, Kaipanov won the gold medal in the men's 70 kg event at the Asian Wrestling Championships held in Xi'an, China. At the 2019 World Wrestling Championships held in Nur-Sultan, Kazakhstan, he won the silver medal in the men's 70 kg event. In the same year, he also won the silver medal in the men's 74 kg event at the 2019 Military World Games held in Wuhan, China.

In 2021, Kaipanov won one of the bronze medals in the 74 kg event at the Matteo Pellicone Ranking Series held in Rome, Italy. He competed in the 74 kg event at the 2022 World Wrestling Championships held in Belgrade, Serbia.

Kaipanov competed at the 2024 Asian Wrestling Olympic Qualification Tournament in Bishkek, Kyrgyzstan hoping to qualify for the 2024 Summer Olympics in Paris, France. He was eliminated in his third match and he did not qualify for the Olympics. Kaipanov also competed at the 2024 World Wrestling Olympic Qualification Tournament held in Istanbul, Turkey without qualifying for the Olympics.

Nurkozha Kaipanov won the gold medal at the 2024 World Wrestling Championships in Tirana, Albania, defeating Japan's Yoshinosuke Aoyagi 5–3 in the men's freestyle 70 kg final match. Nurkozha Kaipanov defeated Israel's Mitch Finesilver 9–0 in the first round, Moldovan Nicolai Grahmez 14–2 in the second round, Georgian Akaki Kemertelidze 12–2 in the quarter-finals and Abdulmazhid Kudiev competing for Tajikistan 13–2 in the semifinals.

== Achievements ==
Year	Competition	Venue	Position	Event	Notes
Representing Kazakhstan
2019	Asian Championships	Xi'an, China	1st	Freestyle 70 kg	
2019	World Championships	Nur-Sultan, Kazakhstan	2nd	Freestyle 70 kg	
2019	Military World Games	Wuhan, China	2nd	Freestyle 74 kg	
2021	Asian Championships	Almaty, Kazakhstan	1st	Freestyle 74 kg	
2022	Asian Championships	Ulaanbaatar, Mongolia	2nd	Freestyle 74 kg	
2024	World Championships	Tirana, Albania	1st	Freestyle 70 kg	
