= 2025 European Wrestling Championships – Men's freestyle 70 kg =

Wrestling competition

Men's freestyle 70 kg at the 2025 European Wrestling Championships
- Venue: X-Bionic Sphere
- Location: Bratislava, Slovakia
- Dates: 7-8 April
- Competitors: 15

Medalists
gold medal	David Baev
silver medal	Arman Andreasyan	Armenia
bronze medal	Akaki Kemertelidze	Georgia
bronze medal	Kanan Heybatov	Azerbaijan

The men's freestyle 70 kg is a competition featured at the 2025 European Wrestling Championships, and was held in Bratislava, Slovakia on April 7 and 8.

== Results ==
Legend

- F — Won by fall

Round of 16
Haydar Yavuz (TUR)	11
Ibragim Veliev (BEL)	0
Oleksii Boruta (UKR)	6
George Koliev (UWW)	2
Mateusz Łuszczyński (POL)	0
Arman Andreasyan (ARM)	10
Vasile Diacon (MDA)	6
Viktor Voinović (SRB)	10
Ismail Musukaev (HUN)	0
David Baev (UWW)	10
Fati Vejseli (MKD)	1
Mihail Georgiev (BUL)	2
Benedikt Huber (AUT)	0
Kanan Heybatov (AZE)	10

Quarterfinals
Akaki Kemertelidze (GEO)	9
Haydar Yavuz (TUR)	0
Oleksii Boruta (UKR)	0
Arman Andreasyan (ARM)	4
Viktor Voinović (SRB)	0
David Baev (UWW)	10
Mihail Georgiev (BUL)	1
Kanan Heybatov (AZE)	4

Semifinals
Akaki Kemertelidze (GEO)	1
Arman Andreasyan (ARM)	3
David Baev (UWW)	3
Kanan Heybatov (AZE)	0

Final
Arman Andreasyan (ARM)	1
David Baev (UWW)	4

Repechage round 1
Mateusz Łuszczyński (POL)	0
Oleksii Boruta (UKR)	11
Ismail Musukaev (HUN)	4
Viktor Voinović (SRB)	2

Bronze medal match
Oleksii Boruta (UKR)	2
Akaki Kemertelidze (GEO)	6
Ismail Musukaev (HUN)	2
Kanan Heybatov (AZE)	5

== Final standing ==
Rank	Athlete
1st place, gold medalist(s)	David Baev (UWW)
2nd place, silver medalist(s)	Arman Andreasyan (ARM)
3rd place, bronze medalist(s)	Akaki Kemertelidze (GEO)
3rd place, bronze medalist(s)	Kanan Heybatov (AZE)
5	Oleksii Boruta (UKR)
5	Ismail Musukaev (HUN)
7	Haydar Yavuz (TUR)
8	Viktor Voinović (SRB)
9	Mihail Georgiev (BUL)
10	Vasile Diacon (MDA)
11	George Koliev (UWW)
12	Fati Vejseli (MKD)
13	Benedikt Huber (AUT)
14	Ibragim Veliev (BEL)
15	Mateusz Łuszczyński (POL)
