= Wrestling at the 2022 Asian Games – Men's freestyle 74 kg =

Men's freestyle 74 kg at the 2022 Asian Games
- Venue: Lin'an Sports and Culture Centre
- Date: 7 October 2023
- Competitors: 19 from 19 nations

Medalists
gold medal	Younes Emami	Iran
silver medal	Kirin Kinoshita	Japan
bronze medal	Orozobek Toktomambetov	Kyrgyzstan
bronze medal	Bekzod Abdurakhmonov	Uzbekistan

The men's 74 kilograms freestyle wrestling competition at the 2022 Asian Games was held on 7 October 2023 at the Lin'an Sports and Culture Centre in Hangzhou. The event was competed by 19 competitors from 19 nations. Younes Emami of Iran won the gold medal after defeating Kirin Kinoshita of Japan in the final. Orozobek Toktomambetov of Kyrgyzstan and Bekzod Abdurakhmonov of Uzbekistan won the bronze medals.

== Background ==
Men's freestyle wrestling was first contested at the 1954 Asian Games in Manila. It has been contested at every edition of the Asian Games since then.

Uzbekistan's Bekzod Abdurakhmonov was the defending champion, having won the gold medal in the same weight category at the 2018 Asian Games in Jakarta. Kazakhstan's Daniyar Kaisanov won the silver medal, while South Korea's Gong Byung-min and Japan's Yuhi Fujinami won the bronze medals. Of the medalists from the previous Asian Games, Abdurakhmonov and Byung-min returned to compete in the 2022 Asian Games.

Abdurakhmonov is a bronze medalist in the 74 kg category at the 2020 Summer Olympics in Tokyo. He is a two time Asian Games gold medalist having won the 70 kg event at the 2014 Asian Games and the 74 kg event at the 2018 Asian Games. He had also won bronze medals at the 2014 and 2018 World Wrestling Championships, and gold medals at the 2015 and 2017 Asian Wrestling Championships. Iran's Younes Emami is a two-time World Championships bronze medallist, having finished third in the 70 kg category in 2019 and the 74 kg category in 2022. He had also won the gold medal at the 2022 Asian Wrestling Championships.

Japan's Kirin Kinoshita won the silver medal at the 2023 Asian Wrestling Championships, finishing behind Kazakhstan's Darkhan Yessengali, who won the gold medal in the 74 kg category. Byung-min, the bronze medalist from the previous Asian Games, who had lost to Kinoshita at the 2023 Asian Wrestling Championships, also competed in the event. Other competitors included Mongolia's Zandanbudyn Sumiyaabazar, who was the bronze medalist at the 2021 Asian Wrestling Championships, and Kyrgyzstan's Orozbek Toktomambetov, who had won several medals in the 70 kg category.

== Format ==
The freestyle wrestling competition was competed as a single-elimination tournament. The two finalists competed against each other for the gold and silver medals. Each wrestler who loses to one of the two finalists moves into the repechage rounds, which is used to determine the bronze medals. The losers of the semifinals compete against the remaining repechage opponent from their half of the bracket in the bronze medal bout.

== Schedule ==
The men's freestyle 74 kg event was held on 7 October 2023 held at the Lin'an Sports and Culture Centre in Hangzhou.

All times are China Standard Time (UTC+08:00)

Date	Time	Event
Saturday, 7 October 2023	10:00	Qualifications
Saturday, 7 October 2023	10:00	1/8 finals
Saturday, 7 October 2023	10:00	1/4 finals
Saturday, 7 October 2023	10:00	Semifinals
Saturday, 7 October 2023	10:00	Repechages
Saturday, 7 October 2023	17:00	Finals

== Summary ==
The event was competed by 19 competitors from 19 nations. Emami beat Toktomambetov 7–2 in the round of 16 before defeating China's Lu Feng 10–2 in the quarterfinals. In the semifinals, he beat Tajikistan's Magomet Evloev by a score of 9–3 victory to qualify for the gold medal match. The other finalist was Kinoshita, who defeated Turkmenistan's Perman Hommadov 10–0 by technical superiority in the quarterfinals before beating defending Asian Games champion Abdurakhmonov 6–0 in the semifinals.

In the final, Emami defeated Kinoshita 9–0 to win the gold medal, while Kinoshita settled for the silver medal. Abdurakhmonov and Toktomambetov won the two bronze medals. Abdurakhmonov defeated Hommadov by a fall, while Toktomambetov defeated Evloev 4–2 to claim the other bronze medal.

== Results ==
Legend

- F — Won by fall

=== Main bracket ===
==== Final ====
Gold medal match
Younes Emami (IRI)	9
Kirin Kinoshita (JPN)	0

==== Top Half ====
Qualifications
Magomet Evloev (TJK)	10
Mohammad Abdulkareem (KUW)	0

1/8 finals
Chhoeun Chheang (CAM)	0
Yash Tushir (IND)	10
Magomet Evloev (TJK)	7
Gong Byung-min (KOR)	3
Lu Feng (CHN)	11
Inayat Ullah (PAK)	0
Orozobek Toktomambetov (KGZ)	2
Younes Emami (IRI)	7

1/4 finals
Yash Tushir (IND)	1
Magomet Evloev (TJK)	12
Lu Feng (CHN)	2
Younes Emami (IRI)	10

Semifinals
Magomet Evloev (TJK)	3
Younes Emami (IRI)	9

==== Bottom Half ====
Qualifications
Cấn Tất Dự (VIE)	4
Kirin Kinoshita (JPN)	10^{F}
Magomedrasul Asluev (BRN)	10
Parinya Chamnanjan (THA)	0

1/8 finals
Perman Hommadow (TKM)	11
Suresh Chunara (NEP)	0
Kirin Kinoshita (JPN)	10
Dawson Sihavong (LAO)	0
Bekzod Abdurakhmonov (UZB)	2
Magomedrasul Asluev (BRN)	0
Zandanbudyn Sumiyaabazar (MGL)	1
Darkhan Yessengali (KAZ)	2

1/4 finals
Perman Hommadow (TKM)	0
Kirin Kinoshita (JPN)	10
Bekzod Abdurakhmonov (UZB)	3
Darkhan Yessengali (KAZ)	1

Semifinals
Kirin Kinoshita (JPN)	6
Bekzod Abdurakhmonov (UZB)	0

=== Repechage ===
Repechage round 1
Cấn Tất Dự (VIE)	12
Dawson Sihavong (LAO)	12^{F}

Repechage round 2
Orozobek Toktomambetov (KGZ)	8
Lu Feng (CHN)	5
Dawson Sihavong (LAO)	0
Perman Hommadow (TKM)	6^{F}

Bronze medal matches
Orozobek Toktomambetov (KGZ)	4
Magomet Evloev (TJK)	2
Perman Hommadow (TKM)	0
Bekzod Abdurakhmonov (UZB)	4^{F}

== Final standing ==
Rank	Athlete
1st place, gold medalist(s)	Younes Emami (IRI)
2nd place, silver medalist(s)	Kirin Kinoshita (JPN)
3rd place, bronze medalist(s)	Orozobek Toktomambetov (KGZ)
3rd place, bronze medalist(s)	Bekzod Abdurakhmonov (UZB)
5	Magomet Evloev (TJK)
5	Perman Hommadow (TKM)
7	Lu Feng (CHN)
8	Dawson Sihavong (LAO)
9	Yash Tushir (IND)
10	Magomedrasul Asluev (BRN)
11	Darkhan Yessengali (KAZ)
12	Gong Byung-min (KOR)
13	Zandanbudyn Sumiyaabazar (MGL)
14	Cấn Tất Dự (VIE)
15	Chhoeun Chheang (CAM)
16	Mohammad Abdulkareem (KUW)
17	Parinya Chamnanjan (THA)
18	Inayat Ullah (PAK)
19	Suresh Chunara (NEP)
