= 2023 U23 World Wrestling Championships – Men's freestyle 70 kg =

Wrestling competitions

Men's freestyle 70 kg at the 2023 U23 World Championships
- Venue: Tirana Olympic Park
- Dates: 24–25 October
- Competitors: 23 from 20 nations

Medalists
gold medal	Inalbek Sheriev	Authorised Neutral Athletes
silver medal	Yoshinosuke Aoyagi	Japan
bronze medal	Giorgi Elbakidze	Georgia
bronze medal	Kanan Heybatov	Azerbaijan

The men's freestyle 70 kg is a competition featured at the 2023 U23 World Wrestling Championships, and was held in Tirana, Albania on 24 and 25 October 2023.

This freestyle wrestling competition consists of a single-elimination tournament, with a repechage used to determine the winner of two bronze medals. The two finalists face off for gold and silver medals. Each wrestler who loses to one of the two finalists moves into the repechage, culminating in a pair of bronze medal matches featuring the semifinal losers each facing the remaining repechage opponent from their half of the bracket.

== Results ==
Legend

- F — Won by fall
- R — Retired

=== Final ===
Final
Yoshinosuke Aoyagi (JPN)	3
Inalbek Sheriev (ANA)	9

=== Top half ===
Round of 32
Matías Muñoz (CHI)	13
Egzon Xhoni (KOS)	9
Noah Castillo (PUR)	1
Ibragim Veliev (BEL)	3
Yoshinosuke Aoyagi (JPN)	9
Theocharis Kougioumtsidis (GRE)	0

Round of 16
Giorgi Elbakidze (GEO)	8
Abhimanyou Mandwal (UWW)	5
Matías Muñoz (CHI)	0
Moukhammad Sangariev (FRA)	10
Burak Sinin (TUR)	3
Ibragim Veliev (BEL)	2
Yoshinosuke Aoyagi (JPN)	10
Narek Pohosian (UKR)	0

Quarterfinals
Giorgi Elbakidze (GEO)	10
Moukhammad Sangariev (FRA)	0
Burak Sinin (TUR)	0
Yoshinosuke Aoyagi (JPN)	5

Semifinals
Giorgi Elbakidze (GEO)	2
Yoshinosuke Aoyagi (JPN)	9

=== Bottom half ===
Round of 32
Inalbek Sheriev (ANA)	13
Kanan Heybatov (AZE)	3
Stone Lewis (CAN)	0
Rodion Anchugin (KAZ)	10
Doug Zapf (USA)	12
Benedikt Huber (AUT)	1
Mateusz Łuszczyński (POL)	0
Tigran Ghazaryan (ARM)	10

Round of 16
Farouk Jelassi (TUN)	1
Inalbek Sheriev (ANA)	11
Rodion Anchugin (KAZ)	8
Daniil Amelyanchyk (ANA)	4
Ion Marcu (MDA)	0
Doug Zapf (USA)	7
Tigran Ghazaryan (ARM)	0
Orozobek Toktomambetov (KGZ)	10

Quarterfinals
Inalbek Sheriev (ANA)	10
Rodion Anchugin (KAZ)	0
Doug Zapf (USA)	3
Orozobek Toktomambetov (KGZ)	3

Semifinals
Inalbek Sheriev (ANA)	9
Doug Zapf (USA)	2

=== Repechage ===
Repechage round 1
Theocharis Kougioumtsidis (GRE)	0
Narek Pohosian (UKR)	12
Kanan Heybatov (AZE)	11
Farouk Jelassi (TUN)	0

Repechage round 2
Narek Pohosian (UKR)	0
Burak Sinin (TUR)	5
Kanan Heybatov (AZE)	10
Rodion Anchugin (KAZ)	2

Bronze medals
Burak Sinin (TUR)	0^{R}
Giorgi Elbakidze (GEO)	5
Kanan Heybatov (AZE)	9
Doug Zapf (USA)	2
