= 2024 U23 World Wrestling Championships – Men's freestyle 79 kg =

Wrestling competitions

Men's freestyle 79 kg at the 2024 U23 World Championships
- Venue: Tirana Olympic Park
- Dates: 26–27 October
- Competitors: 25 from 23 nations

Medalists
gold medal	Mehdi Yousefi	Iran
silver medal	Lu Feng	China
bronze medal	Masaki Sato	Japan
bronze medal	Arsen Balaian	Authorised Neutral Athletes

The men's freestyle 79 kilograms is a competition featured at the 2024 U23 World Wrestling Championships, and will be held in Tirana, Albania on 26 and 27 October 2024.

This freestyle wrestling competition consists of a single-elimination tournament, with a repechage used to determine the winner of two bronze medals. The two finalists face off for gold and silver medals. Each wrestler who loses to one of the two finalists moves into the repechage, culminating in a pair of bronze medal matches featuring the semifinal losers each facing the remaining repechage opponent from their half of the bracket.

== Results ==
Legend

- F — Won by fall
- R — Retired

=== Final ===
Final
Mehdi Yousefi (IRI)	12
Lu Feng (CHN)	5

=== Top half ===
Round of 32
Arjan Danaj (ALB)	0
Ali Tcokaev (AZE)	11
Mehdi Yousefi (IRI)	11
Owen Martin (CAN)	0
Okan Tahtacı (TUR)	12
Raffaele Matrullo (ITA)	14
Mukhammad Abdullaev (KGZ)	0
Patrick Kennedy (USA)	11
Masaki Sato (JPN)	5^{F}
Artsiom Belavusau (AIN)	0

Round of 16
Ivan Harashuk (UKR)	4
Ali Tcokaev (AZE)	4^{R}
Mehdi Yousefi (IRI)	10
Raffaele Matrullo (ITA)	0
Umar Mavlaev (SUI)	0
Patrick Kennedy (USA)	9^{F}
Masaki Sato (JPN)	10
Joona Vuoti (FIN)	0

Quarterfinals
Ivan Harashuk (UKR)	0
Mehdi Yousefi (IRI)	11
Patrick Kennedy (USA)	6
Masaki Sato (JPN)	8

Semifinals
Mehdi Yousefi (IRI)	12
Masaki Sato (JPN)	1

=== Bottom half ===
Round of 32
Mateusz Pędzicki (POL)	2
Arsen Balaian (AIN)	13
Otari Adeishvili (GEO)	9
Radomir Stoyanov (BUL)	10
Hayk Papikyan (ARM)	4
Lu Feng (CHN)	10
Mohamed Abdelhady (EGY)	12
Gheorghi Cara (MDA)	10

Round of 16
Sahil Dalal (IND)	0
Arsen Balaian (AIN)	10
Radomir Stoyanov (BUL)	0
Zhengis Kanybekov (KAZ)	10
Krisztian Biro (ROU)	1
Lu Feng (CHN)	3
Mohamed Abdelhady (EGY)	16
Juan Cardozo (COL)	6

Quarterfinals
Arsen Balaian (AIN)	6^{F}
Zhengis Kanybekov (KAZ)	1
Lu Feng (CHN)	11
Mohamed Abdelhady (EGY)	0

Semifinals
Arsen Balaian (AIN)	2
Lu Feng (CHN)	4

=== Repechage ===
Repechage round 1
Owen Martin (CAN)	6
Raffaele Matrullo (ITA)	5
Hayk Papikyan (ARM)	4
Krisztian Biro (ROU)	2

Repechage round 2
Owen Martin (CAN)	9
Ivan Harashuk (UKR)	2
Hayk Papikyan (ARM)	8
Mohamed Abdelhady (EGY)	4

Bronze medals
Owen Martin (CAN)	0
Masaki Sato (JPN)	11
Hayk Papikyan (ARM)	1
Arsen Balaian (AIN)}	9

== Final standing ==
Rank	Athlete
1st place, gold medalist(s)	Mehdi Yousefi (IRI)
2nd place, silver medalist(s)	Lu Feng (CHN)
3rd place, bronze medalist(s)	Masaki Sato (JPN)
3rd place, bronze medalist(s)	Arsen Balaian (AIN)
5	Owen Martin (CAN)
5	Hayk Papikyan (ARM)
7	Patrick Kennedy (USA)
8	Mohamed Abdelhady (EGY)
9	Ivan Harashuk (UKR)
10	Ali Tcokaev (AZE)
11	Zhengis Kanybekov (KAZ)
12	Raffaele Matrullo (ITA)
13	Radomir Stoyanov (BUL)
14	Krisztian Biro (ROU)
15	Okan Tahtacı (TUR)
16	Gheorghi Cara (MDA)
17	Otari Adeishvili (GEO)
18	Juan Cardozo (COL)
19	Mateusz Pędzicki (POL)
20	Artsiom Belavusau (AIN)
21	Umar Mavlaev (SUI)
22	Joona Vuoti (FIN)
23	Sahil Dalal (IND)
24	Arjan Danaj (ALB)
25	Mukhammad Abdullaev (KGZ)
