= 2026 World Wrestling Championships – Men's freestyle 74 kg =

Wrestling competitions

Men's freestyle 74 kg at the 2026 World Championships
- Venue: Barys Arena
- Dates: 31 October – 1 November 2026
- Competitors: 37 from 36 nations

Medalists
gold medal	Inalbek Sheriev	Russia
silver medal	Nurkozha Kaipanov	Kazakhstan
bronze medal	Amir Mohammad Yazdani	Iran
bronze medal	Yoshinosuke Aoyagi	Japan

The men's freestyle 74 kilograms is a competition featured at the 2026 World Wrestling Championships, and was held in Astana, Kazakhstan on 31 October and 1 November 2026.

This freestyle wrestling competition consists of a single-elimination tournament, with a repechage used to determine the winner of two bronze medals. The two finalists face off for gold and silver medals. Each wrestler who loses to one of the two finalists moves into the repechage, culminating in a pair of bronze medal matches, featuring the semifinal losers each facing the remaining repechage opponent from their half of the bracket.

== Results ==
Legend

- F — Won by fall
- WO — Won by walkover

=== Finals ===
Semifinals		Final
Tajmuraz Salkazanov (SVK)	1
Inalbek Sheriev (RUS)	3	Inalbek Sheriev (RUS)	10
Yoshinosuke Aoyagi (JPN)	1	Nurkozha Kaipanov (KAZ)	4
Nurkozha Kaipanov (KAZ)	3

=== Top half ===
==== Section 1 ====
Round of 64
Leung Hong Ki (HKG)	1
Alfred Daniel (SLE)	8^{F}

Round of 32
Tajmuraz Salkazanov (SVK)	4
Constantin Chirilov (MDA)	0
Valentyn Hryhoryshyn (UKR)	5
Cüneyt Budak (TUR)	7
Alfred Daniel (SLE)	0
Omar Mohamed Mourad (EGY)	10
Jeon Jin-su (KOR)	1
Farhad Nouri (EOR)	9

Round of 16
Tajmuraz Salkazanov (SVK)	6
Cüneyt Budak (TUR)	0
Omar Mohamed Mourad (EGY)	6
Farhad Nouri (EOR)	2

Quarterfinals
Tajmuraz Salkazanov (SVK)	10
Omar Mohamed Mourad (EGY)	0

==== Section 2 ====
Round of 64
Narek Harutyunyan (ARM)	0
Inalbek Sheriev (RUS)	10
Maxim Fricatel (ROU)	2
Ebierelayefa Andrew (NGR)	1

Round of 32
Orozobek Toktomambetov (KGZ)	0
James Green (USA)	5
Kamil Rybicki (POL)	0
Inalbek Sheriev (RUS)	10
Maxim Fricatel (ROU)	0
Geannis Garzón (CUB)	9
Amir Mohammad Yazdani (IRI)	4
Murad Kuramagomedov (HUN)	3

Round of 16
James Green (USA)	0
Inalbek Sheriev (RUS)	10
Geannis Garzón (CUB)	12
Amir Mohammad Yazdani (IRI)	15

Quarterfinals
Inalbek Sheriev (RUS)	4^{F}
Amir Mohammad Yazdani (IRI)	0

=== Bottom half ===
==== Section 3 ====
Round of 64
Mohammad Mottaghinia (ESP)	WO
~~Caetano António Sá (GBS)~~

Round of 32
Magomedrasul Asluev (BRN)	3
Sagar Jaglan (IND)	1
Ibsen Aguilar (VEN)	10
Omar Lambarraa (MAR)	0
Mohammad Mottaghinia (ESP)	11
Fati Vejseli (MKD)	0
Batuqinggele (CHN)	0
Yoshinosuke Aoyagi (JPN)	10

Round of 16
Magomedrasul Asluev (BRN)	10
Ibsen Aguilar (VEN)	0
Mohammad Mottaghinia (ESP)	1
Yoshinosuke Aoyagi (JPN)	4

Quarterfinals
Magomedrasul Asluev (BRN)	2
Yoshinosuke Aoyagi (JPN)	5

==== Section 4 ====
Round of 64
Javokhir Chuliboev (UZB)	1
Viktor Rassadin (TJK)	11

Round of 32
Ibragim Veliev (BEL)	0
Baatarkhüügiin Gan-Erdene (MGL)	10
Nikita Dmitrijevs Mayeuski (BLR)	1
Viktor Rassadin (TJK)	4
Nurkozha Kaipanov (KAZ)	10
Egzon Xhoni (KOS)	0
Turan Bayramov (AZE)	2
Giorgi Elbakidze (GEO)	1

Round of 16
Baatarkhüügiin Gan-Erdene (MGL)	1
Viktor Rassadin (TJK)	11
Nurkozha Kaipanov (KAZ)	4
Turan Bayramov (AZE)	0

Quarterfinals
Viktor Rassadin (TJK)	0
Nurkozha Kaipanov (KAZ)	11

=== Repechage ===
Repechage round 1
Narek Harutyunyan (ARM)	2
Kamil Rybicki (POL)	1

Repechage round 2
Narek Harutyunyan (ARM)	2
James Green (USA)	15
Egzon Xhoni (KOS)	0
Turan Bayramov (AZE)	7

Repechage round 3
James Green (USA)	2
Amir Mohammad Yazdani (IRI)	8
Turan Bayramov (AZE)	2
Viktor Rassadin (TJK)	2

Bronze medals
Amir Mohammad Yazdani (IRI)	5
Tajmuraz Salkazanov (SVK)	4
Turan Bayramov (AZE)	0
Yoshinosuke Aoyagi (JPN)	11

== Final standing ==
Rank	Athlete
1st place, gold medalist(s)	Inalbek Sheriev (RUS)
2nd place, silver medalist(s)	Nurkozha Kaipanov (KAZ)
3rd place, bronze medalist(s)	Amir Mohammad Yazdani (IRI)
3rd place, bronze medalist(s)	Yoshinosuke Aoyagi (JPN)
5	Tajmuraz Salkazanov (SVK)
5	Turan Bayramov (AZE)
7	Viktor Rassadin (TJK)
8	Mohammad Mottaghinia (ESP)
9	James Green (USA)
10	Magomedrasul Asluev (BRN)
11	Omar Mohamed Mourad (EGY)
12	Alfred Daniel (SLE)
13	Baatarkhüügiin Gan-Erdene (MGL)
14	Ibsen Aguilar (VEN)
15	Geannis Garzón (CUB)
16	Farhad Nouri (EOR)
17	Narek Harutyunyan (ARM)
18	Cüneyt Budak (TUR)
19	Maxim Fricatel (ROU)
20	Valentyn Hryhoryshyn (UKR)
21	Murad Kuramagomedov (HUN)
22	Giorgi Elbakidze (GEO)
23	Ebierelayefa Andrew (NGR)
24	Sagar Jaglan (IND)
25	Nikita Dmitrijevs Mayeuski (BLR)
26	Jeon Jin-su (KOR)
27	Javokhir Chuliboev (UZB)
28	Kamil Rybicki (POL)
29	Leung Hong Ki (HKG)
30	Constantin Chirilov (MDA)
31	Orozobek Toktomambetov (KGZ)
32	Ibragim Veliev (BEL)
33	Omar Lambarraa (MAR)
34	Batuqinggele (CHN)
35	Fati Vejseli (MKD)
36	Egzon Xhoni (KOS)
—	Caetano António Sá (GBS)
