= Yoshinosuke Aoyagi =

Japanese freestyle wrestler

Yoshinosuke Aoyagi 青柳善の輔
Personal information
- Nationality: Japan
- Born: 13 February 2002 (age 24) Saitama Prefecture, Japan
- Height: 1.70 m (5 ft 7 in)
- Weight: 74 kg (163 lb; 11.7 st)

Sport
- Country: Japan
- Sport: Wrestling
- Weight class: 74 kg
- Event: Freestyle
Medal record
Men's freestyle wrestling
Representing Japan
World Championships
Gold medal – first place	2025 Zagreb	70 kg
Silver medal – second place	2024 Tirana	70 kg
Bronze medal – third place	2026 Astana	74 kg
Asian Games
Silver medal – second place	2026 Aichi–Nagoya	74 kg
Asian Championships
Gold medal – first place	2026 Bishkek	74 kg
Silver medal – second place	2024 Bishkek	70 kg
Bronze medal – third place	2023 Astana	70 kg
Bronze medal – third place	2025 Amman	70 kg
Yasar Dogu Tournament
Bronze medal – third place	2024 Antalya	70 kg
Grand Prix
Gold medal – first place	2024 Sangju	70 kg
Gold medal – first place	2025 Tirana	70 kg
Gold medal – first place	2025 Budapest	70 kg
Silver medal – second place	2026 Zagreb	74 kg
U23 World Championships
Silver medal – second place	2023 Tirana	70 kg
Bronze medal – third place	2024 Tirana	70 kg
Bronze medal – third place	2025 Novi Sad	74 kg
Japan National Championships
Gold medal – first place	2023 Tokyo	70 kg
Gold medal – first place	2024 Tokyo	70 kg
U20 World Championships
Bronze medal – third place	2022 Sofia	65 kg
U17 World Championships
Bronze medal – third place	2019 Sofia	60 kg

Yoshinosuke Aoyagi (born 13 February 2002) is a Japanese freestyle wrestler. He won the silver medal at the 2024 World Wrestling Championships.

== Wrestling career ==
=== National career ===
In 2023, Aoyagi became the champion of his country in 70 kg. He defended this title, winning once more in 2024.

=== International career ===
In 2019, Aoyagi won a bronze at the U17 World Championships held in Sofia. He went on to again win Bronze in Sofia in the 65 kg class at the 2022 U20 World Championships.

Aoyagi won the bronze medal in 70 kg at the 2023 Asian Championships in Astana. He also won the silver medal in the 70 kg weight class at the U23 World Championships in Tirana that same year.

In April 2024, he won the silver medal at the Asian Championships in Bishkek, losing to Iranian wrestler Amir Mohammad Yazdani in the final.

At the 2024 World Wrestling Championships in Tirana, Albania, he lost to Kazakh Nurkozha Kaipanov 5-3 in the men's freestyle 70 kg final match and won the silver medal. Aoyagi reached the final by defeating Turkish Yasin Yeşil 11-0 in the second round, Ukrainian Vasyl Shuptar 12-2 with technical superiority in the quarter-finals and Inalbek Sheriev, who competed for Russia, who participated as an Individual Independent, 6-1 in the semi-finals.

Also at Tirana that year, he won a bronze medal at 70 kg at the U23 World Championships.

Rounding out 2024, he won Gold at the Grand Prix event in Sangju, and bronze in the Yasar Dogu Tournament in Antalya - both in the 70 kg weight class.

In 2025 Grand Prix events, Aoyagi won gold in both Tirana and Budapest in the 70 kg weight class. He also achieved a bronze place finish at the 2025 Asian Championships in Amman in the same class.
