= Deyvand =

Deyvand ديوند
- Village
- Location within Iran
- Coordinates: 34°15′23″N 47°50′22″E
- Country: Iran
- Province: Lorestan
- County: Delfan
- Bakhsh: Kakavand
- Rural District: Kakavand-e Sharqi

Population (2006)
  - Total: 117
- Time zone: UTC+3:30 (IRST)
  - Summer (DST): UTC+4:30 (IRDT)

Deyvand (Persian: ديوند, also Romanized as Dehvand; also known as Sān Choqā-ye ‘Olyā) is a village in Kakavand-e Sharqi Rural District, Kakavand District, Delfan County, Lorestan Province, Iran. At the 2006 census, its population was 117, in 25 families.
