= Lu Feng (wrestler) =

Chinese freestyle wrestler

Personal information
- Native name: 陆锋
- Nationality: China
- Born: 10 December 2003 (age 22) Hengzhou, Nanning, Guangxi, China
- Education: Beijing Sport University
- Height: 172 cm (5 ft 8 in)
- Weight: 74 kg (163 lb)

Sport
- Country: China
- Sport: Amateur wrestling
- Weight class: 74 kg
- Event: Freestyle
- Coached by: Li Zhengyu
Medal record
Men's freestyle wrestling
Representing China
World U23 Championships
Silver medal – second place	2024 Tirana	79 kg
Grand Prix
Bronze medal – third place	2023 Budapest	74 kg

Lu Feng (Chinese: 陆锋, born 10 December 2003) is a Chinese freestyle wrestler.

He represented the China in the 74 kg event at the 2024 Summer Olympics. He also won a silver medal in the 79.kg event at the 2024 U23 World Wrestling Championships.

== Background ==
Lu was born in Hengzhou, Nanning, Guangxi province. He was trained at the Nanning Sports School and later joined the Guangxi provincial team and eventually the national team.

== Career ==
Lu gained a spot at the 74 kg event in the 2024 Summer Olympics after United World Wrestling reallocated wrestling quotas. He defeated Amr Reda Hussen in the Round of 16 before losing to Viktor Rassadin in the quarterfinal. Lu placed eighth overall.

In October 2024, Lu won a silver medal in the 79 kg event at the 2024 U23 World Wrestling Championships where he lost to Mehdi Yousefi in the finals.
