= Akaki Kemertelidze =

Georgian freestyle wrestler

Personal information
- Native name: აკაკი ქემერტელიძე
- Nationality: Georgia
- Born: 1 January 1999 (age 27) Georgia
- Height: 1.76 m (5 ft 9 in)

Sport
- Country: Georgia
- Sport: Amateur wrestling
- Weight class: 70 kg
- Event: Freestyle
Medal record
Men's freestyle wrestling
Representing Georgia
European Championships
Silver medal – second place	2024 Bucharest	70 kg
Bronze medal – third place	2025 Bratislava	70 kg
Bronze medal – third place	2026 Tirana	70 kg
Grand Prix
Gold medal – first place	2024 Zagreb	70 kg
Silver medal – second place	2026 Zagreb	70 kg
Bronze medal – third place	2024 Budapest	70 kg
Bronze medal – third place	2025 Budapest	70 kg

Akaki Kemertelidze (born 1999) is a Georgian freestyle wrestler who currently competes at 70 kilograms

== Career ==
Kemertelidze won one the silver medal in the men's 70 kg event at the 2024 European Wrestling Championships held in Bucharest, Romania. He lost Arman Andreasyan of Armenia in his final match.

== Achievements ==
Year	Tournament	Location	Result	Event
2024	European Championships	Bucharest, Romania	2nd	Freestyle 70 kg
2025	European Championships	Bratislava, Slovakia	3nd	Freestyle 70 kg
