= Arman Andreasyan =

Armenian freestyle wrestler

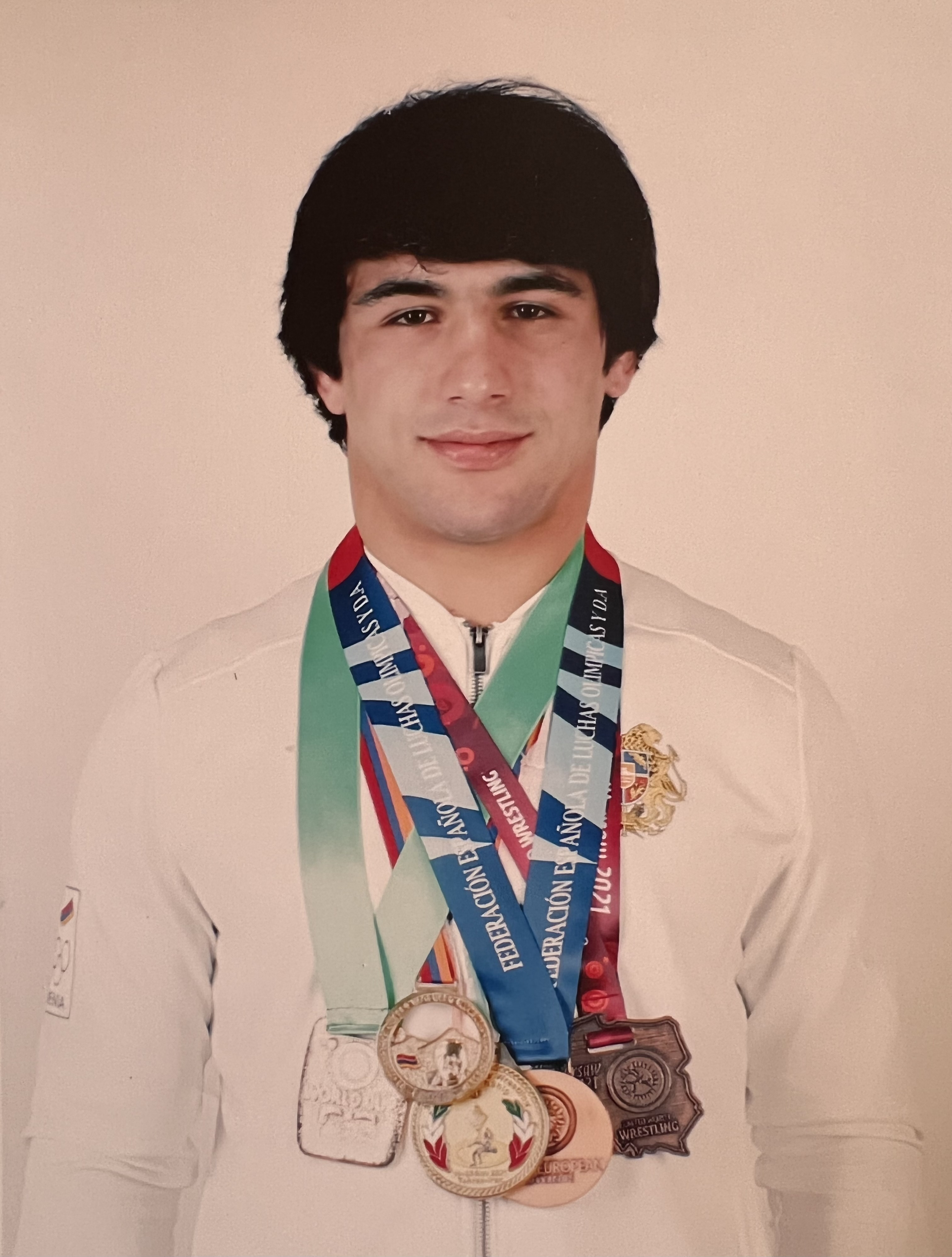
- Arman Andreasyan at the 2021 World Wrestling Championships in Oslo, Norway

Personal information
- Native name: Արման Անդրեասյան
- Nationality: Armenia
- Born: 27 December 1999 (age 26)
- Height: 167 cm (5 ft 6 in)

Sport
- Country: Armenia
- Sport: Amateur wrestling
- Weight class: 70 kg
- Event: Freestyle

Achievements and titles
- World finals: (bronze) (2023)
- Regional finals: (gold) (2024)
Medal record
Men's freestyle wrestling
Representing Armenia
World Championships
Bronze medal – third place	2023 Belgrade	70 kg
European Championships
Gold medal – first place	2024 Bucharest	70 kg
Silver medal – second place	2025 Bratislava	70 kg
Silver medal – second place	2022 Budapest	70 kg
Bronze medal – third place	2021 Warsaw	70 kg
Individual World Cup
Bronze medal – third place	2020 Belgrade	70 kg
Grand Prix
Gold medal – first place	2022 Warsaw	70 kg
Gold medal – first place	2024 Budapest	70 kg
Silver medal – second place	2025 Budapest	70 kg
World Military Championships
Gold medal – first place	2021 Tehran	70 kg
European U23 Championships
Bronze medal – third place	2021 Skopje	70 kg

Arman Andreasyan is an Armenian freestyle wrestler. He is a bronze medalist at the World Wrestling Championships and three-time medalist, including gold, at the European Wrestling Championships.

== Career ==
Andreasyan won one of the bronze medals in the men's 70 kg event at the 2020 Individual Wrestling World Cup held in Belgrade, Serbia.

In 2021, Andreasyan won one of the bronze medals in the men's 70 kg at the European Wrestling Championships held in Warsaw, Poland. Two weeks later, he failed to qualify for the 2020 Summer Olympics in Tokyo, Japan at the World Olympic Qualification Tournament held in Sofia, Bulgaria.

In October 2021, he lost his bronze medal match in the men's 70 kg event at the World Wrestling Championships held in Oslo, Norway. He competed in the men's 70 kg event at the 2022 World Wrestling Championships held in Belgrade, Serbia.

Andreasyan won one of the bronze medals in the men's 70 kg event at the 2023 World Wrestling Championships held in Belgrade, Serbia. He won the gold medal in the men's 70 kg event at the 2024 European Wrestling Championships held in Bucharest, Romania.

== Achievements ==
Year	Tournament	Venue	Result	Event
2021	European Championships	Warsaw, Poland	3rd	Freestyle 70 kg
2022	European Championships	Budapest, Hungary	2nd	Freestyle 70 kg
2023	World Championships	Belgrade, Serbia	3rd	Freestyle 70 kg
2024	European Championships	Bucharest, Romania	1st	Freestyle 70 kg
2025	European Championships	Bratislava, Slovakia	2nd	Freestyle 70 kg
