= Takuto Otoguro =

Japanese freestyle wrestler

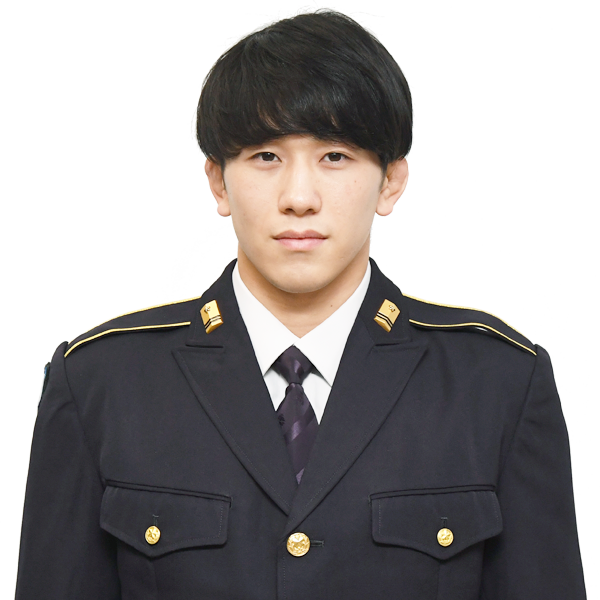
- Otoguro in 2021

Personal information
- Native name: 乙黒拓斗
- Nationality: Japanese
- Born: 13 December 1998 (age 27) Fuefuki, Yamanashi, Japan
- Height: 173 cm (5 ft 8 in)
- Website: Instagram Profile

Sport
- Country: Japan
- Sport: Wrestling
- Weight class: 65 kg
- Event: Freestyle
- Club: JSDF Physical Training School

Achievements and titles
- Olympic finals: (gold) (2020)
- World finals: (gold) (2018) 5th(2019)
- Regional finals: (gold) (2020) (gold) (2021)
Medal record
Men's freestyle wrestling
Representing Japan
Olympic Games
Gold medal – first place	2020 Tokyo	65 kg
World Championships
Gold medal – first place	2018 Budapest	65 kg
World Cup
Bronze medal – third place	2018 Iowa	Team
Asian Championships
Gold medal – first place	2021 Almaty	65 kg
Gold medal – first place	2020 New Delhi	65 kg
Japan National Championships
Gold medal – first place	2019 Tokyo	65 kg
Gold medal – first place	2018 Tokyo	65 kg
All-Japan Invitational Championships
Gold medal – first place	2018 Tokyo	65 kg
Silver medal – second place	2019 Tokyo	65 kg
World Cadets Championships
Gold medal – first place	2015 Sarajevo	54 kg
Bronze medal – third place	2013 Zrenjanin	46 kg
Asian Cadets Championships
Gold medal – first place	2014 Bangkok	50 kg

Takuto Otoguro (乙黒 拓斗, Otoguro Takuto; born December 13, 1998) is a Japanese freestyle wrestler who competes at 65 kilograms. At the 2020 Summer Olympics, Otoguro claimed the gold medal after beating the likes of defending World Champion Gadzhimurad Rashidov and three-time World Champion Haji Aliyev. A Cadet World Champion, Otoguro first broke into the senior scene when he went undefeated (16–0) in 2018, claiming the world championship and the national championship at age 19. He then went on to become a two–time Asian Continental Champion (claiming titles in 2020 and 2021).

== Career ==
=== Early career ===
Otoguro begun wrestling at a young age. During his junior high school years, he studied and trained at the Elite Academy, which is hosted by the Japanese Olympic Committee. His first international appearance came at the 2013 Cadet World Championships, where he claimed a bronze medal. After earning the 2014 Cadet Asian Championship, Otoguro was unable to medal at the 2014 Cadet World Championship, placing eleventh. In 2015, Otoguro became a Cadet World Champion.

=== Senior level ===
==== 2018 ====
Otoguro made his senior freestyle debut in April 2018, at the World Cup, where he posted wins over 2016 World Champion and four–time NCAA champion Logan Stieber and India's 2017 Junior Asian Champion Sharvan. Otoguro then comfortably claimed the All–Japan Invitational crown with a flawless 6–0 win in the finals against 2016 Olympic Silver medalist Rei Higuchi, qualifying him for the JPN World Team Trials. At the WTT, he faced '2018 Asian Championship runner–up Daichi Takatani, whom he was able to flawlessly drive to a technical fall in under two minutes to claim the spot.

At the World Championships, Otoguro made his way to the semifinals with three technical falls, including one over the accomplished veteran Vasyl Shuptar. In the semis, he had a 25–point score match against Russian National champion Akhmed Chakaev, whom he was able to edge 15–10 to make the finals. In the finals, he had another 25–point score match, now against 2018 Asian Games Gold medalist Bajrang Punia, whom he defeated 16–9 to claim the World Championship at 65 kilograms. In doing so, Otaguro became the youngest Japanese wrestler to ever win a world title at the age of 19. He then wasted no time and became Japan's National Champion with wins over the accomplished Rei Higuchi and '18 Asian Games Silver medalist Daichi Takatani (by technical fall), being named the Outstanding Wrestler. After his championship performance through 2018, Otoguro was named one of the Breakout Performers of the Year and his match with Punia was named the Match of the Year by United World Wrestling.

==== 2019 ====
Otoguro was not able to compete at the Asian Championships nor the World Cup due to a knee injury and was able to practice again a month before the All-Japan Invitational Championships. At the tournament, limited preparation seemed to affect Otoguro, who lost by technical fall to Rei Higuchi in his first career loss as a senior. As the '18 Japan National champion, Otoguro rematched Higuchi at the WTT, and was able to defeat him to earn the spot.

At the World Championships, the returning champion got through the first round with a comfortable 6–0 score, but was then soundly defeated by two–time World Championship runner-up and eventual winner of the championship Gadzhimurad Rashidov with a score of 1–8. As the Russian kept advancing, Otoguro was able to go through repechage, where he had a 20–point score battle against three–time World and European Champion Haji Aliyev, whom he edged 11–9, and a 6–1 victory over Haji Mohamad Ali to make it to the third-place match. In the bronze-medal match, he was defeated by 2018 Russian National runner–up Ismail Musukaev to place fifth. Otoguro then became a two–time Japan National Champion and Olympian on December, with a victory over 2017 U23 World champion Rinya Nakamura in the finals.

==== 2020 ====
Otoguro came back in big fashion on February, when he claimed the Asian Continental Championship while posting notable and dominant victories over 2019 World Championship runner-up and three–time Asian Champion Daulet Niyazbekov (10–3) and the accomplished veteran Bajrang Punia in a rematch (10–2).

Otoguro was scheduled to represent Japan at the 2020 Summer Olympics on August, however, the Olympic Games were postponed due to the COVID-19 pandemic, and are now expected to take place on August 1–7, 2021.

==== 2021 ====
After a full year of no competition due to the pandemic, Otoguro competed at the 2021 Asian Championships in April 17–18. To make the finals, he dominated 2019 Junior Asian Continental runner–up Nodir Rakhimov to a technical fall and defeated Morteza Ghiasi. In the finals, he was set up to face rival Bajrang Punia, but Punia pulled out of the match due to an elbow injury, resulting in Otoguro claiming his second gold medal from the Asian continental championships.

At the 2020 Summer Olympics, an unseeded Otoguro debuted against former U23 Asian Champion, Tömör-Ochiryn Tulga, and defeated the Mongolian by a 6–3 score; in the quarter-final, Otoguro would then face Ismail Musukaev, who defeated Otoguro at the 2019 World Championships for a bronze medal. Otoguro would exact revenge, and defeated Musukaev by 4–1, thus advancing Otoguro into the semi-final - against Gadzhimurad Rashidov, another former opponent from 2019. After a competitive six minutes, Otoguro, again, exacted revenge and defeated the 2019 World Champion, by 3–2, gaining entry to the final - opposite Azerbaijan's Haji Aliyev. Against another one of his former 2019 World Championship opponents, Otoguro defeated the former Olympic Bronze medalist, and three-time World Champion, Aliyev by 5–4 in the final, to earn his first ever Olympic medal, and took first place on the podium.

== Personal life ==
Takuto has a brother named Keisuke Otoguro, who is also a world-class wrestler.

== Freestyle record ==
Senior freestyle matches
Res.	Record	Opponent	Score	Date	Event	Location
2023 Japan Nationals 5th at 65 kg
Loss		(Japan) Toshihiro Hasegawa	FF	December 21–24, 2023	2023 Emperor's Cup All-Japan Championships	Tokyo, Japan
Loss	46–5	(Japan) Kotaro Kiyooka	6–6	December 21–24, 2023	2023 Emperor's Cup All-Japan Championships	Tokyo, Japan
Win	46–4	(Japan) Kaiji Ogino	8–2	December 21–24, 2023	2023 Emperor's Cup All-Japan Championships	Tokyo, Japan
Win	45–4	(Japan) Takurō Matsubara	TF 11–0	December 21–24, 2023	2023 Emperor's Cup All-Japan Championships	Tokyo, Japan
2023 World Championships DNP at 65 kg
Loss		(Kazakhstan) Adil Ospanov	FF	September 19, 2023	2023 World Championships	Belgrade, Serbia
Loss	44–4	(Hungary) Ismail Musukaev	Fall	September 19, 2023	2023 World Championships	Belgrade, Serbia
Win	44–3	(Ukraine) Erik Arushanian	TF 10–0	September 19, 2023	2023 World Championships	Belgrade, Serbia
Win	43–3	(Albania) Islam Dudaev	9–2	September 19, 2023	2023 World Championships	Belgrade, Serbia
2023 Japan Nationals (gold) at 65 kg
Win	42–3	(Japan) Ryoma Anraku	9–0	June 15–18, 2023	2023 Meiji Cup All–Japan Invitational Championships	Tokyo, Japan
Win	41–3	(Japan) Kaiki Yamaguchi	3–2	June 15–18, 2023	2023 Meiji Cup All–Japan Invitational Championships	Tokyo, Japan
Win	40–3	(Japan) Kaiji Ogino	2–0	June 15–18, 2023	2023 Meiji Cup All–Japan Invitational Championships	Tokyo, Japan
2022 Japan Nationals (gold) at 65 kg
Win	39–3	(Japan) Ryoma Anraku	4–0	December 22–25, 2022	2022 Emperor's Cup All-Japan Championships	Tokyo, Japan
Win	38–3	(Japan) Kaiji Ogino	TF 10–0	December 22–25, 2022	2022 Emperor's Cup All-Japan Championships	Tokyo, Japan
Win	37–3	(Japan) Kenho Uto	TF 10–0	December 22–25, 2022	2022 Emperor's Cup All-Japan Championships	Tokyo, Japan
2020 Summer Olympics (gold) at 65 kg
Win	36–3	(Azerbaijan) Haji Aliyev	5–4	August 6–7, 2021	2020 Summer Olympics	Tokyo, Japan
Win	35–3	(Russia) Gadzhimurad Rashidov	3–2	August 6–7, 2021	2020 Summer Olympics	Tokyo, Japan
Win	34–3	(Hungary) Iszmail Muszukajev	4–1	August 6–7, 2021	2020 Summer Olympics	Tokyo, Japan
Win	33–3	(Mongolia) Tömör-Ochiryn Tulga	6–3	August 6–7, 2021	2020 Summer Olympics	Tokyo, Japan
2021 Asian Championships (gold) at 65 kg
Win		(India) Bajrang Punia	INJ	April 17–18, 2021	2021 Asian Continental Championships	Almaty, Kazakhstan
Win	32–3	(Iran) Morteza Ghiasi	8–2	April 17–18, 2021	2021 Asian Continental Championships	Almaty, Kazakhstan
Win	31–3	(Uzbekistan) Nodir Rakhimov	TF 13–0	April 17–18, 2021	2021 Asian Continental Championships	Almaty, Kazakhstan
2020 Asian Championships (gold) at 65 kg
Win	30–3	(India) Bajrang Punia	10–2	February 18–23, 2020	2020 Asian Continental Championships	New Delhi, India
Win	29–3	(Mongolia) Nyamdorj Battulga	TF 11–1	February 18–23, 2020	2020 Asian Continental Championships	New Delhi, India
Win	28–3	(Kazakhstan) Daulet Niyazbekov	10–3	February 18–23, 2020	2020 Asian Continental Championships	New Delhi, India
Win	27–3	(Iraq) Mohammed Al Jawad Zuhair Kareem	TF 10–0	February 18–23, 2020	2020 Asian Continental Championships	New Delhi, India
2019 Japan Nationals (gold) at 65 kg
Win	26–3	(Japan) Rinya Nakamura	TF 10–0	December 19, 2019	2019 Japanese National Championships	Tokyo, Japan
Win	25–3	(Japan) Ryoma Anraku	8–1	December 19, 2019	2019 Japanese National Championships	Tokyo, Japan
Win	24–3	(Japan) Shoya Shimae	6–1	December 19, 2019	2019 Japanese National Championships	Tokyo, Japan
Win	23–3	(Japan) Yasuki Tsutsumi	5–2	December 19, 2019	2019 Japanese National Championships	Tokyo, Japan
2019 World Championships 5th at 65 kg
Loss	22–3	(Hungary) Iszmail Muszukajev	3–5	September 19–20, 2019	2019 World Championships	Nur-Sultan, Kazakhstan
Win	22–2	(Bahrain) Haji Mohamad Ali	6–1	September 19–20, 2019	2019 World Championships	Nur-Sultan, Kazakhstan
Win	21–2	(Azerbaijan) Haji Aliyev	11–9	September 19–20, 2019	2019 World Championships	Nur-Sultan, Kazakhstan
Loss	20–2	(Russia) Gadzhimurad Rashidov	1–8	September 19–20, 2019	2019 World Championships	Nur-Sultan, Kazakhstan
Win	20–1	(Armenia) Vazgen Tevanyan	6–0	September 19–20, 2019	2019 World Championships	Nur-Sultan, Kazakhstan
2019 JPN World Team Trials (gold) at 65 kg
Win	19–1	(Japan) Rei Higuchi	PP	July 6, 2019	2019 Japan Play-offs	(Japan) Wakō, Saitama
2019 Meiji Cup (silver) at 65 kg
Loss	18–1	(Japan) Rei Higuchi	TF 5–15	June 17, 2019	2019 All–Japan Invitational Championships	Tokyo, Japan
Win	18–0	(Japan) Yujiro Ueno	TF 10–0	June 17, 2019	2019 All–Japan Invitational Championships	Tokyo, Japan
Win	17–0	(Japan) Kouki Shimizu	3–0	June 17, 2019	2019 All–Japan Invitational Championships	Tokyo, Japan
2018 Japan Nationals (gold) at 65 kg
Win	16–0	(Japan) Daichi Takatani	TF 10–0	December 20, 2018	2018 Japanese National Championships	Tokyo, Japan
Win	15–0	(Japan) Rei Higuchi	8–3	December 20, 2018	2018 Japanese National Championships	Tokyo, Japan
Win	14–0	(Japan) Rinya Nakamura	TF 10–0	December 20, 2018	2018 Japanese National Championships	Tokyo, Japan
Win	13–0	(Japan) Hirotaka Abe	TF 14–3	December 20, 2018	2018 Japanese National Championships	Tokyo, Japan
2018 World Championships (gold) at 65 kg
Win	12–0	(India) Bajrang Punia	16–9	October 21–22, 2018	2018 World Championships	Budapest, Hungary
Win	11–0	(Russia) Akhmed Chakaev	15–10	October 21–22, 2018	2018 World Championships	Budapest, Hungary
Win	10–0	(Moldova) Andrei Prepeliţă	TF 12–2	October 21–22, 2018	2018 World Championships	Budapest, Hungary
Win	9–0	(Ukraine) Vasyl Shuptar	TF 11–0	October 21–22, 2018	2018 World Championships	Budapest, Hungary
Win	8–0	(Romania) George Bucur	TF 13–2	October 21–22, 2018	2018 World Championships	Budapest, Hungary
2018 JPN World Team Trials (gold) at 65 kg
Win	7–0	(Japan) Daichi Takatani	TF 11–0	July 7, 2018	2018 Japan Play-offs	(Japan) Wakō, Saitama
2018 Meiji Cup (gold) at 65 kg
Win	6–0	(Japan) Rei Higuchi	6–0	June 15, 2018	2018 Meiji Cup	Tokyo, Japan
Win	5–0	(Japan) Koki Shimizu	TF 10–0	June 15, 2018	2018 Meiji Cup	Tokyo, Japan
Win	4–0	(Japan) Shoya Shimae	TF 11–0	June 15, 2018	2018 Meiji Cup	Tokyo, Japan
Win	3–0	(Japan) Ryoma Anraku	4–0	June 15, 2018	2018 Meiji Cup	Tokyo, Japan
2018 World Cup (bronze) for Team JPN at 65 kg
Win	2–0	(India) Sharvan Sharvan	TF 10–0	April 7–8, 2018	2018 World Cup	(United States) Iowa City, Iowa
Win	1–0	(United States) Logan Stieber	10–5	April 7–8, 2018	2018 World Cup	(United States) Iowa City, Iowa
