= Bajrang Punia =

Indian freestyle wrestler (born 1994)

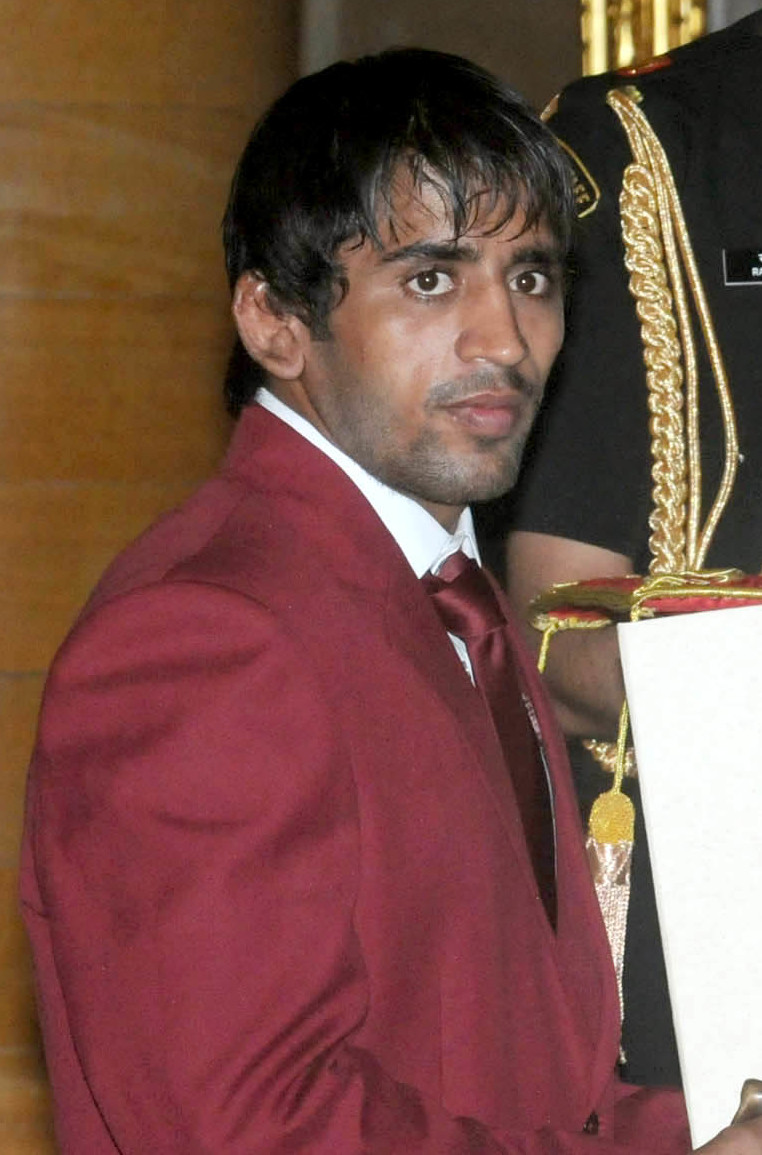
- Punia in 2015

Personal information
- Born: 26 February 1994 (age 32) Khudan, Haryana, India
- Height: 1.66 m (5 ft 5 in)
- Spouse: Sangeeta Phogat (m. 2020)

Sport
- Sport: Wrestling
- Event: Freestyle
- Coached by: Emzarios Bentinidis; Sujeet Maan

Achievements and titles
- Olympic finals: (bronze) ×1
- World finals: (silver) ×1 (bronze) ×3
- Regional finals: (gold) ×3 (silver) ×5 (bronze) ×2
- Commonwealth finals: (gold) ×2 (silver) ×1
Medal record
Men's freestyle wrestling
Representing India
| Event | 1st | 2nd | 3rd |
|---|---|---|---|
| Olympic Games | - | - | 1 |
| World Championships | - | 1 | 3 |
| Asian Games | 1 | 1 | - |
| Asian Championships | 2 | 4 | 2 |
| Asian Indoor Games | 1 | 0 | 0 |
| Commonwealth Games | 2 | 1 | - |
| Commonwealth Championships | 2 | - | - |
| Grand Prix | 5 | 1 | - |
| U23 World Championships | - | 1 | - |
| Total | 13 | 9 | 6 |
Olympic Games
| Bronze medal – third place | 2020 Tokyo | 65kg |
World Championships
| Silver medal – second place | 2018 Budapest | 65kg |
| Bronze medal – third place | 2013 Budapest | 60kg |
| Bronze medal – third place | 2019 Nur-Sultan | 65kg |
| Bronze medal – third place | 2022 Belgrade | 65kg |
Asian Games
| Gold medal – first place | 2018 Jakarta | 65kg |
| Silver medal – second place | 2014 Incheon | 61kg |
Asian Championships
| Gold medal – first place | 2017 New Delhi | 65kg |
| Gold medal – first place | 2019 Xi'an | 65kg |
| Silver medal – second place | 2014 Astana | 61kg |
| Silver medal – second place | 2020 New Delhi | 65kg |
| Silver medal – second place | 2021 Almaty | 65kg |
| Silver medal – second place | 2022 Ulaanbaatar | 65kg |
| Bronze medal – third place | 2013 New Delhi | 60kg |
| Bronze medal – third place | 2018 Bishkek | 65kg |
Asian Indoor Games
| Gold medal – first place | 2017 Ashgabat | 65kg |
Commonwealth Games
| Gold medal – first place | 2018 Gold Coast | 65kg |
| Gold medal – first place | 2022 Birmingham | 65kg |
| Silver medal – second place | 2014 Glasgow | 61kg |
Commonwealth Championships
| Gold medal – first place | 2016 Singapore | 65kg |
| Gold medal – first place | 2017 Johannesburg | 65kg |
Grand Prix
| Gold medal – first place | 2018 Tbilisi | 65kg |
| Gold medal – first place | 2018 Istanbul | 70kg |
| Gold medal – first place | 2019 Ruse | 65kg |
| Gold medal – first place | 2020 Rome | 65kg |
| Gold medal – first place | 2021 Rome | 65kg |
| Bronze medal – third place | 2022 Almaty | 65kg |
U23 World Championships
| Silver medal – second place | 2017 Bydgoszcz | 65kg |

Bajrang Punia (born 26 February 1994) is an Indian freestyle wrestler. He has won a bronze medal at the 2020 Tokyo Olympics. Punia is also a four-time medalist at the World Championships, making him the first and only Indian wrestler to accomplish this feat. He is a multiple gold medalist at the Asian Games, Asian Championships, Commonwealth Games and Commonwealth Championships. He was the first Indian wrestler to achieve the World No.1 ranking and remains the only Indian to have held that position consistently for two years. Punia has been honored with the Khel Ratna, Arjuna Award, and Padma Shri.

== Early life and background ==
Punia was born in Khudan village, Jhajjar, Haryana, India. He began wrestling at the age of seven and was encouraged to pursue the sport by his father. Punia grew up in rural area. His family did not have money for traditional sports. Instead, he had to partake in free sports like Wrestling and Kabaddi. Punia's father was a wrestler as well and at a young age, his family enrolled him in a local mud wrestling school. Punia started to skip school to go to wrestling practice. He went to Chattarsal Stadium in 2008 where he was trained by Ramphal Mann. In 2015, his family moved to Sonepat so that he could attend a regional center of Sports Authority of India.

He used to work in the Indian Railways on the post of Gazetted officer OSD Sports and resigned in 2024 September Punia is married to fellow wrestler Sangeeta Phogat.

== Political career ==
On 7 September 2024, Punia joined Indian National Congress along with fellow wrestler Vinesh Phogat after meeting Leader of Opposition, Rahul Gandhi just before the 2024 Haryana Legislative Assembly election. According to some political analysts, Punia and Phogat's entry in Congress was a boost for the party, which was aiming to consolidate Jat votes and capitalize on the anti-incumbency against the Haryana BJP in the 2024 state elections.

On 22 October 2024, Punia took charge as Working President of the All India Kisan Congress at the Congress party headquarters in the New Delhi in the presence of senior party leaders, including All India Kisan Congress National President, Sukhpal Singh Khaira, Congress General Secretary Kumari Selja, former Union Minister Chaudhary Birendra Singh, and newly elected party MLA and former wrestler Vinesh Phogat. According to senior Congress leaders, Punia was expected to raise the voice of the farmers and labourers of the country in his new important role in the party.

== Sports career ==
=== 2013 Asian Wrestling Championships ===
In New Delhi, India, in the semi-final bout, Bajrang lost 3–1 to Hwang Ryong-hak of North Korea to win the bronze medal in the men's freestyle 60 kg category.

In the Round of 16, he faced Shogo Maeda of Japan, beating him 3–1. His opponent in the quarter-finals was Morad Hassan of Iran whom he beat 3–1 to qualify for the semi-finals.

=== 2013 World Wrestling Championships ===
In Budapest, Hungary, Bajrang won the bronze medal in the men's freestyle 60 kg category by qualifying for the bronze medal bout through the repechage round. There, he met Enkhsaikhany Nyam-Ochir of Mongolia and beat him 9–2.

In the Round of 32, he faced Vladimir Dubov of Bulgaria who beat him 7–0. With the Bulgarian grappler qualifying for the final bout, Bajrang then faced Shogo Maeda of Japan and earned a walkover. His next opponent was Ivan Guidea of Romania, and with a 10–3 win over the Romanian, Bajrang earned a spot in the bronze medal bout.

=== 2014 Commonwealth Games ===
In Glasgow, Scotland, he won the silver medal in the men's freestyle 61 kg category, after losing 1–4 to David Tremblay of Canada.

In the Round of 16, Bajrang faced Sasha Madyarchyk of England and beat him 4–0. He faced Marno Plaatjies of South Africa in the quarter-finals and won 4–1. The Nigerian wrestler, Amas Daniel, was his opponent in the semi-finals and overcame him in a 3–1 score line.

=== 2014 Asian Games ===
In Incheon, South Korea, he won the silver medal in the Men's freestyle 61 kg category, after losing 1–3 to Masoud Esmaeilpoorjouybari of Iran.

In the Round of 16, he faced Tuvshintulga Tumenbileg of Mongolia and beat him 3–1. His quarter-finals opponent was Farkhodi Usmonzoda of Tajikistan whom he beat 4–1 to qualify for the semi-finals. He was assured of a medal when he beat Noriyuki Takatsuka of Japan 4–1 in the semi-finals.

=== 2014 Asian Wrestling Championships ===
In Astana, Kazakhstan, Bajrang won the silver medal in the men's freestyle 61 kg category, losing 0–4 to Masoud Esmaeilpour of Iran.

In the Round of 16, he met Lee Seung-Chul of South Korea, whom he beat 3–1. In the quarter-finals, he faced Noriyuki Takatsuka of Japan, whom he beat 3–1 to qualify for the semi-finals. There he met Nazmandakh Lhamgarmaa of Mongolia whom he beat 3–1 to assure himself of a medal.

=== 2015 World Wrestling Championships ===
Unlike his fellow Narsingh Yadav, Bajrang was not able to win a medal at the tournament in Las Vegas and finished 5th.

In the Round of 32, he met Batboldyn Nomin of Mongolia who beat him 10–0. With the Mongolian qualifying for the final bout in the 61 kg category, Bajrang got a chance to contest in the Repêchage round. His first opponent in the repêchage round was Reece Humphrey of the USA whom he beat 6–0 easily. The second repêchage opponent was Beka Lomtadze from Georgia who put up a fight but was ultimately overcome 13–6 by the Indian. Unfortunately, he fell at the last hurdle, drawing the bronze medal bout 6–6 but his opponent Vasyl Shuptar of Ukraine, scoring the last point.

=== Asian Wrestling Championship 2017 ===
In 2017 May, he won a gold medal at the Asian Wrestling Championship held in Delhi.

=== Pro Wrestling League ===
Bajrang was the second acquisition of the JSW owned Bangalore franchise in the auction conducted in New Delhi. The wrestler was picked up for a sum of Rs 29.5 lakh.

The Pro Wrestling League was scheduled to be held from 10 to 27 December across six cities.

=== 2018 Commonwealth Games ===
In Gold Coast, Australia, he won the gold medal in the men's freestyle 65 kg category. He overcame Kane Charig of Wales by Technical Superiority to clinch the gold.

=== 2018 Asian Games ===
On 19 August, he won the Men's freestyle 65 kg /Gold medal. He defeated Japanese Wrestler Takatani Daichi 11–8; the score was locked at 6–6 after the first round.

=== 2018 World Wrestling Championships ===
Bajrang won Silver at the 2019 World Wrestling Championships. After that silver medal, he claimed World No. 1 in 65 kg category.

=== 2019 World Wrestling Championships ===
He won Bronze for the second time at a World Championship, thereby qualifying India for the Tokyo 2020 Olympics in the 65 kg freestyle wrestling event.

=== 2020 Rome Ranking Series ===
On 18 January, Bajrang defeated Jordan Oliver 4–3 in the final in the 65 kg freestyle category at the Ranking Series.

=== Matteo Pellicone Ranking Series 2021 ===
In 2021, he won the gold medal in the 65 kg event at the Matteo Pellicone Ranking Series 2021 held in Rome, Italy.

=== 2021 Asian Wrestling Championships ===
He clinched a silver medal at the 2021 Asian Wrestling Championships after losing to Takuto Otoguro in the final.

=== 2020 Tokyo Olympics ===
On 6 August 2021, he won the pre-quarterfinal match in 65 kg category in 2020 Summer Olympics against Ernazar Akmataliev and his quarter-final match against Morteza Ghiasi Cheka.

In the bronze medal match, he defeated the Kazakhstani wrestler Daulet Niyazbekov, winning by a margin of 8–0.

Bajrang and the other Indian Olympians were featured in a can by the Indian soft drink manufacturer, Thums Up.

=== 2022 Commonwealth Games ===
Bajrang clinched the gold medal with a dominating win over Canada's Lachlan McNeil in the 65 kg final bout at the 2022 Birmingham Commonwealth Games.

=== 2024 ===
In April 2024, Punia was suspended by the National Anti-Doping Agency (NADA) for refusing to give his urine sample for a dope test during the selection trials of the 2024 Olympic qualifiers. Subsequently, he was also suspended by the wrestling global body, the United Wrestling World (UWW). Punia has gone to court and appealed against his suspension.

=== 2025 ===
Punia competed at RAF 01 on 30 August 2025 for the inaugural RAF Lightweight Championship, losing to Yianni Diakomihalis.

=== 2026 ===
He lost to Ridge Lovett in a Lightweight title eliminator at RAF 09 on 30 May 2026.

== International competitions ==
=== World Championship ===
| Year | Competition | Venue | Event | Rank | Opponent |
|---|---|---|---|---|---|
| 2022 | 2022 World Wrestling Championships | Belgrade | 65 kg | 3rd place, bronze medalist(s) | Sebastian Rivera (PUR) |
| 2019 | 2019 World Wrestling Championships | Nur-Sultan | 65 kg | 3rd place, bronze medalist(s) | Daulet Niyazbekov (KAZ) |
| 2018 | 2018 World Wrestling Championships | Budapest | 65 kg | 2nd place, silver medalist(s) | Takuto Otoguro (JPN) |
| 2017 | 2017 World Wrestling Championships | Paris France | 65 kg | 13th | Zurabi Iakobishvili (GEO) |
| 2016 | 2016 World Wrestling Championships | Budapest | 61 kg | 9th | Akhmednabi Gvarzatilov (AZE) |
| 2015 | 2015 World Wrestling Championships | Las Vegas | 61 kg | 5th | Batboldyn Nomin (MGL) |
| 2013 | 2013 World Wrestling Championships | Hungry | 60 kg | 3rd place, bronze medalist(s) | Vladimir Dubov (BUL) |

=== U23 World Championship ===
| Year | Competition | Venue | Event | Rank | Opponent |
|---|---|---|---|---|---|
| 2017 | 2017 World U23 Wrestling Championships | Bydgoszcz | 65 kg | 2nd place, silver medalist(s) | Nachyn Kuular (RUS) |

=== Asian Games ===
| Year | Competition | Venue | Event | Rank | Opponent |
|---|---|---|---|---|---|
| 2022 | 2022 Asian Games | Hangzhou | 65 kg | 5th | Kaiki Yamaguchi (JPN) |
| 2018 | 2018 Asian Games | Jakarta | 65kg | 1st place, gold medalist(s) | Daichi Takatani (JPN) |
| 2014 | 2014 Asian Games | Incheon | 61kg | 2nd place, silver medalist(s) | Masoud Esmaeilpour (IRI) |

=== Commonwealth Games ===
| Year | Competition | Venue | Event | Rank | Opponent |
|---|---|---|---|---|---|
| 2022 | 2022 Commonwealth Games | Birmingham | 65kg | 1st place, gold medalist(s) | Lachlan McNeil (CAN) |
| 2018 | 2018 Commonwealth Games | Gold Coast | 65kg | 1st place, gold medalist(s) | Kane Charig (WAL) |
| 2014 | 2014 Commonwealth Games | Glasgow | 61kg | 2nd place, silver medalist(s) | David Tremblay (CAN) |

=== Asian Wrestling Championship ===
| Year | Competition | Venue | Event | Rank | Opponent |
|---|---|---|---|---|---|
| 2021 | 2021 Asian Wrestling Championships | Almaty | 65kg | 2nd place, silver medalist(s) | Takuto Otoguro (JPN) |
| 2020 | 2020 Asian Wrestling Championships | New Delhi | 65kg | 2nd place, silver medalist(s) | Takuto Otoguro (JPN) |
| 2019 | 2019 Asian Wrestling Championships | Xi'an | 65kg | 1st place, gold medalist(s) | Sayatbek Okassov (KAZ) |
| 2018 | 2018 Asian Wrestling Championships | Bishkek | 65kg | 3rd place, bronze medalist(s) | Daichi Takatani (JPN) |
| 2017 | 2017 Asian Wrestling Championships | New Delhi | 65kg | 1st place, gold medalist(s) | Seunghui Lee (KOR) |
| 2016 | 2016 Asian Wrestling Championships | Bangkok | 65kg | 10th | Kum Su JON (PRK) |
| 2014 | 2014 Asian Wrestling Championships | Astana | 61kg | 2nd place, silver medalist(s) | Masoud Esmaeilpour (IRI) |
| 2013 | 2013 Asian Wrestling Championships | New Delhi | 60kg | 3rd place, bronze medalist(s) | Yang Jae-hoon (KOR) |

=== Olympics ===
| Year | Competition | Venue | Event | Rank | Opponent |
|---|---|---|---|---|---|
| 2021 | Tokyo Olympics 2020 | Tokyo | 65 kg | 3rd place, bronze medalist(s) | Daulet Niyazbekov (Kazakhstan) |

== Record against opponents ==
| Weight | Players | Matches | Results | | Change |
| Weight | Players | Matches | Won | Lost | Change |
|---|---|---|---|---|---|
| 65 kg | (Cuba) Alejandro Valdés | 1 | 1 | 0 | +1 |
| 65 kg | (Japan) Takuto Otoguro | 2 | 0 | 2 | −2 |
| 65 kg | (Japan) Daichi Takatani | 3 | 2 | 1 | +1 |
| 65 kg | (Georgia (country)) Zurabi Iakobishvili | 1 | 0 | 1 | −1 |
| 61 kg | (Georgia (country)) Beka Lomtadze | 1 | 1 | 0 | +1 |
| 65 kg | (Mongolia) Batchuluuny Batmagnai | 4 | 3 | 1 | +2 |
| 65 kg | (Mongolia) Tömör-Ochiryn Tulga | 2 | 2 | 0 | +2 |
| 65 kg | (Mongolia) Batboldyn Nomin | 1 | 0 | 1 | −1 |
| 61 kg | (Mongolia) Enkhsaikhany Nyam-Ochir | 2 | 1 | 1 | 0 |
| 65 kg | (South Korea) Lee Seung-chul | 3 | 3 | 0 | +3 |
| 65 kg | (Kazakhstan) Daulet Niyazbekov | 2 | 1 | 1 | 0 |
| 65 kg | (Kazakhstan) Ashirov Meirzhan | 2 | 2 | 0 | +2 |
| 65 kg | (Kazakhstan) Sayatbek Okassov | 1 | 1 | 0 | +1 |
| 65 kg | (Iran) Meisam Nassiri | 2 | 1 | 1 | 0 |
| 65 kg | (Iran) Younes Emami | 4 | 4 | 0 | +4 |
| 65 kg | (Iran) Masoud Esmaeilpour | 3 | 0 | 3 | −3 |
| 65 kg | (North Korea) Kim Kuk-gwang | 1 | 1 | 0 | +1 |
| 65 kg | (Russia) Viktor Rassadin | 2 | 2 | 0 | +2 |
| 65 kg | (Russia) Murshid Mutalimov | 1 | 1 | 0 | +1 |
| 65 kg | (Russia) Kurban Shiraev | 1 | 1 | 0 | +1 |
| 65 kg | (Russia) Nachyn Kuular | 1 | 0 | 1 | −1 |
| 65 kg | (Uzbekistan) Sirojiddin Khasanov | 3 | 3 | 0 | +3 |
| 65 kg | (United States) Zain Retherford | 2 | 1 | 1 | 0 |
| 65 kg | (United States) Oliver Jordan | 2 | 2 | 0 | +2 |
| 65 kg | (United States) Yianni Diakomihalis | 2 | 0 | 2 | −2 |
| 65 kg | (Ukraine) Gor Ogannesyan | 2 | 2 | 0 | +2 |
| 65 kg | (Ukraine) Vasyl Shuptar | 1 | 1 | 1 | 0 |
| 65 kg | (Turkey) Mustafa Kaya | 2 | 1 | 1 | 0 |
| 65 kg | (Tajikistan) Abdulqosim Fayziev | 3 | 3 | 0 | +3 |

== Awards ==
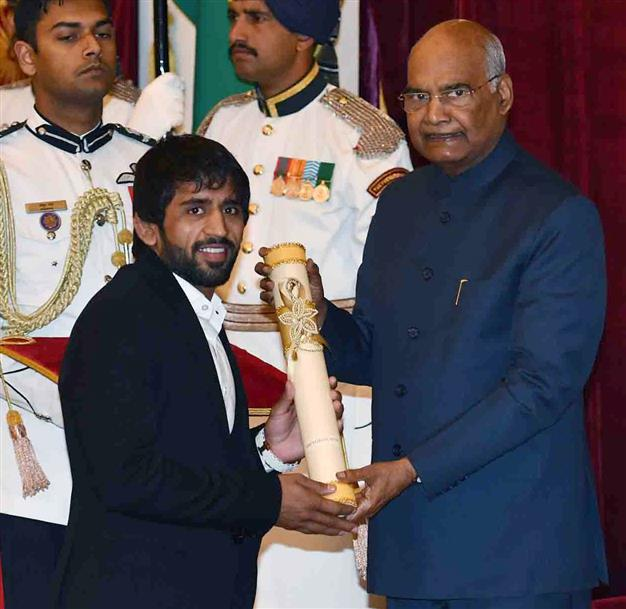
The President, Ram Nath Kovind presenting the Padma Shri Award to Punia at the Rashtrapati Bhavan in New Delhi, 2019.

- Arjuna Award, 2015
- Padma Shri Award, 2019
- Rajiv Gandhi Khel Ratna award, 2019
- FICCI India Sports Award 2020

For winning the bronze medal at the 2020 Tokyo Summer Olympics

- ₹30 lakh (US$31,000) from the Government of India
- ₹2.5 crore (US$260,000) from the Government of Haryana
- ₹25 lakh (US$26,000) from the Board of Control for Cricket in India
- ₹25 lakh (US$26,000) from the Indian Olympic Association

== Socio-political activism ==
Punia has been protesting against the alleged sexual harassment of female wrestlers by Wrestling Federation of India (WFI) Chief - Brij Bhushan Singh. The instances of sexual harassment ranged from 2012 to 2022. Punia has called on the public to show their support at Jantar Mantar, New Delhi.

Following a scuffle between wrestlers and Delhi police at Jantar Mantar, Punia expressed concern about the treatment of wrestlers and its implications for their careers, stating:

What are we supposed to do with the medals if this is how we are going to be treated? It is unfortunate that a person accused of sexual harassment attended the inauguration of the new Parliament building. It took Delhi Police only a few hours to register an FIR against us but it took them 7 days to register an FIR against Brij Bhushan Singh.
