= 2019 World Wrestling Championships – Men's freestyle 65 kg =

Men's freestyle 65 kg at the 2019 World Championships
- Venue: Barys Arena
- Dates: 19–20 September 2019
- Competitors: 44 from 44 nations

Medalists
gold medal	Gadzhimurad Rashidov	Russia
silver medal	Daulet Niyazbekov	Kazakhstan
bronze medal	Bajrang Punia	India
bronze medal	Iszmail Muszukajev	Hungary

The men's freestyle 65 kilograms is a competition featured at the 2019 World Wrestling Championships, and was held in Nur-Sultan, Kazakhstan on 19 and 20 September.

== Results ==
Legend

- F — Won by fall
- R — Retired
- WO — Won by walkover

=== Finals ===
Semifinals		Final
Bajrang Punia (IND)	9
Daulet Niyazbekov (KAZ)	9	Daulet Niyazbekov (KAZ)	0
Iszmail Muszukajev (HUN)	2	Gadzhimurad Rashidov (RUS)	11
Gadzhimurad Rashidov (RUS)	3

=== Top half ===
==== Section 1 ====
Round of 64

Round of 32
Bajrang Punia (IND)	9
Krzysztof Bieńkowski (POL)	2
Fati Vejseli (MKD)	1
David Habat (SLO)	9
Ilman Mukhtarov (FRA)	8
Nurgazy Abdurazakov (KGZ)	0
Son Jong-chol (PRK)	9
Mihail Georgiev (BUL)	0

Round of 16
Bajrang Punia (IND)	3
David Habat (SLO)	0
Ilman Mukhtarov (FRA)	1
Son Jong-chol (PRK)	11

Quarterfinals
Bajrang Punia (IND)	8
Son Jong-chol (PRK)	1

==== Section 2 ====
Round of 64

Round of 32
Alexander Semisorow (GER)	3^{F}
Juan Pablo González (ESP)	2
Chang Yu-hsuan (TPE)	0
Daulet Niyazbekov (KAZ)	10
~~Elie Djekoundakom (CHA)~~
Masoud Niazi (NED)	WO
Niurgun Skriabin (BLR)	2
Tömör-Ochiryn Tulga (MGL)	5

Round of 16
Alexander Semisorow (GER)	8
Daulet Niyazbekov (KAZ)	12
Masoud Niazi (NED)	0
Tömör-Ochiryn Tulga (MGL)	4^{F}

Quarterfinals
Daulet Niyazbekov (KAZ)	6
Tömör-Ochiryn Tulga (MGL)	2

=== Bottom half ===
==== Section 3 ====
Round of 64
Dzhamshed Sharifov (TJK)	10
Gabriel Janatsch (AUT)	0
Brandon Díaz (MEX)	12
Ethan Aguigui (GUM)	2
Malik Amine (SMR)	14
Mbundé Cumba (GBS)	11
Iszmail Muszukajev (HUN)	14
Cristian Nicolescu (PLW)	4
Yun Jun-sik (KOR)	0
Vladimer Khinchegashvili (GEO)	4

Round of 32
Selahattin Kılıçsallayan (TUR)	5
Ivan Guidea (ROU)	1
Dillon Williams (CAN)	6
Dzhamshed Sharifov (TJK)	0
Brandon Díaz (MEX)	6
Malik Amine (SMR)	13
Iszmail Muszukajev (HUN)	5
Vladimer Khinchegashvili (GEO)	1

Round of 16
Selahattin Kılıçsallayan (TUR)	11
Dillon Williams (CAN)	1
Malik Amine (SMR)	0
Iszmail Muszukajev (HUN)	8

Quarterfinals
Selahattin Kılıçsallayan (TUR)	2
Iszmail Muszukajev (HUN)	15

==== Section 4 ====
Round of 64
Yuan Shaohua (CHN)	10
Temurjon Usmonohunov (UZB)	0
Andrei Prepeliţă (MDA)	1
Haji Mohamad Ali (BRN)	5
Zain Retherford (USA)	9
Alejandro Valdés (CUB)	10
Amir Mohammad Yazdani (IRI)	15
Batyr Borjakow (TKM)	2
Gadzhimurad Rashidov (RUS)	4
Haji Aliyev (AZE)	2
Amr Reda Hussen (EGY)	11
Hussein Al-Azzani (YEM)	0
Hor Ohannesian (UKR)	3
Vazgen Tevanyan (ARM)	5

Round of 32
Yuan Shaohua (CHN)	12
Haji Mohamad Ali (BRN)	14^{F}
Alejandro Valdés (CUB)	13
Amir Mohammad Yazdani (IRI)	9
Gadzhimurad Rashidov (RUS)	5
Amr Reda Hussen (EGY)	3
Vazgen Tevanyan (ARM)	0
Takuto Otoguro (JPN)	6

Round of 16
Haji Mohamad Ali (BRN)	11
Alejandro Valdés (CUB)	6
Gadzhimurad Rashidov (RUS)	8
Takuto Otoguro (JPN)	1

Quarterfinals
Haji Mohamad Ali (BRN)	0
Gadzhimurad Rashidov (RUS)	9

=== Repechage ===
Repechage round 1
Haji Aliyev (AZE)	10
Amr Reda Hussen (EGY)	1^{R}

Repechage round 2
Chang Yu-hsuan (TPE)	0
Alexander Semisorow (GER)	4^{F}
Haji Aliyev (AZE)	9
Takuto Otoguro (JPN)	11

Repechage round 3
Alexander Semisorow (GER)	0
Tömör-Ochiryn Tulga (MGL)	8
Takuto Otoguro (JPN)	6
Haji Mohamad Ali (BRN)	1

Bronze medals
Tömör-Ochiryn Tulga (MGL)	7
Bajrang Punia (IND)	8
Takuto Otoguro (JPN)	3
Iszmail Muszukajev (HUN)	5
