= 2023 World Wrestling Championships – Men's freestyle 65 kg =

World Wrestling competitions

Men's freestyle 65 kg at the 2023 World Championships
- Venue: Štark Arena
- Dates: 18–19 September 2023
- Competitors: 45 from 42 nations

Medalists
gold medal	Iszmail Muszukajev	Hungary
silver medal	Sebastian Rivera	Puerto Rico
bronze medal	Shamil Mamedov
bronze medal	Vazgen Tevanyan	Armenia

The men's freestyle 65 kilograms is a competition featured at the 2023 World Wrestling Championships, and was held in Belgrade, Serbia on 18 and 19 September 2023.

This freestyle wrestling competition consists of a single-elimination tournament, with a repechage used to determine the winner of two bronze medals. The two finalists face off for gold and silver medals. Each wrestler who loses to one of the two finalists moves into the repechage, culminating in a pair of bronze medal matches featuring the semifinal losers each facing the remaining repechage opponent from their half of the bracket.

== Results ==
Legend

- F — Won by fall
- WO — Won by walkover

=== Finals ===
Semifinals		Final
Rahman Amouzad (IRI)	5
Iszmail Muszukajev (HUN)	6	Iszmail Muszukajev (HUN)	11
Vazgen Tevanyan (ARM)	9	Sebastian Rivera (PUR)	0
Sebastian Rivera (PUR)	10

=== Top half ===
==== Section 1 ====
Round of 64
Yoon Seok-ki (KOR)	2
Úber Cuero (COL)	6
Austin Gómez (MEX)	8
Anuj Kumar (UWW)	7
Krzysztof Bieńkowski (POL)	0
Nick Lee (USA)	6

Round of 32
Rahman Amouzad (IRI)	10
Yanisse Madi (COM)	0
Ștefan Coman (ROU)	5
Úber Cuero (COL)	1
Austin Gómez (MEX)	3
Nick Lee (USA)	10^{F}
Mikyay Naim (BUL)	0
Umidjon Jalolov (UZB)	6

Round of 16
Rahman Amouzad (IRI)	12
Ștefan Coman (ROU)	0
Nick Lee (USA)	4
Umidjon Jalolov (UZB)	3

Quarterfinals
Rahman Amouzad (IRI)	7
Nick Lee (USA)	4

==== Section 2 ====
Round of 64
Shamil Mamedov (AIN)	15
Ikromzhon Khadzhimurodov (KGZ)	3
Levi Nyongesa (KEN)	0
Ibrahim Guzan (YEM)	10
Islam Dudaev (ALB)	2
Takuto Otoguro (JPN)	9
Lachlan McNeil (CAN)	0
Erik Arushanian (UKR)	11

Round of 32
Agustín Destribats (ARG)	10
Nino Leutert (SUI)	0
Shamil Mamedov (AIN)	11
Ibrahim Guzan (YEM)	0
Takuto Otoguro (JPN)	10
Erik Arushanian (UKR)	0
Adil Ospanov (KAZ)	0
Iszmail Muszukajev (HUN)	7

Round of 16
Agustín Destribats (ARG)	1
Shamil Mamedov (AIN)	10
Takuto Otoguro (JPN)	1
Iszmail Muszukajev (HUN)	6^{F}

Quarterfinals
Shamil Mamedov (AIN)	4
Iszmail Muszukajev (HUN)	5

=== Bottom half ===
==== Section 3 ====
Round of 64
Yuan Shaohua (CHN)	4
Haji Aliyev (AZE)	10
Abdullah Assaf (PLE)	0
Alejandro Valdés (CUB)	10
Abdulmazhid Kudiev (TJK)	6
Khamzat Arsamerzouev (FRA)	2

Round of 32
Tömör-Ochiryn Tulga (MGL)	9
Alexander Semisorow (GER)	2
Georgii Okorokov (AUS)	2
Haji Aliyev (AZE)	9
Alejandro Valdés (CUB)	2
Abdulmazhid Kudiev (TJK)	6
Niurgun Skriabin (AIN)	0
Vazgen Tevanyan (ARM)	9

Round of 16
Tömör-Ochiryn Tulga (MGL)	3
Haji Aliyev (AZE)	3
Abdulmazhid Kudiev (TJK)	6
Vazgen Tevanyan (ARM)	8

Quarterfinals
Haji Aliyev (AZE)	2
Vazgen Tevanyan (ARM)	12

==== Section 4 ====
Round of 64
Colin Realbuto (ITA)	18
Junjun Asebias (FSM)	8
Cavit Acar (TUR)	5
Maxim Saculțan (MDA)	8
Carlos Álvarez (ESP)	5
Josh Finesilver (ISR)	15

Round of 32
Edemi Bolkvadze (GEO)	11
Ethan Aguigui (GUM)	0
Colin Realbuto (ITA)	3
Maxim Saculțan (MDA)	7
Josh Finesilver (ISR)	3
Ayub Musaev (BEL)	9^{F}
Alibeg Alibegov (BRN)	0
Sebastian Rivera (PUR)	10

Round of 16
Edemi Bolkvadze (GEO)	0
Maxim Saculțan (MDA)	4
Ayub Musaev (BEL)	0
Sebastian Rivera (PUR)	10

Quarterfinals
Maxim Saculțan (MDA)	4
Sebastian Rivera (PUR)	15

=== Repechage ===
Repechage round 2
Adil Ospanov (KAZ)	WO
~~Takuto Otoguro (JPN)~~
Alibeg Alibegov (BRN)	5
Ayub Musaev (BEL)	3

Repechage round 3
Adil Ospanov (KAZ)	0
Shamil Mamedov (AIN)	8
Alibeg Alibegov (BRN)	0
Maxim Saculțan (MDA)	2

Bronze medals
Shamil Mamedov (AIN)	8
Rahman Amouzad (IRI)	6
Maxim Saculțan (MDA)	1
Vazgen Tevanyan (ARM)	5

Olympic wrestle-off
Rahman Amouzad (IRI)	10
Maxim Saculțan (MDA)	0

== Final standing ==
Rank	Athlete
1st place, gold medalist(s)	Iszmail Muszukajev (HUN)
2nd place, silver medalist(s)	Sebastian Rivera (PUR)
3rd place, bronze medalist(s)	Shamil Mamedov (AIN)
3rd place, bronze medalist(s)	Vazgen Tevanyan (ARM)
5	Rahman Amouzad (IRI)
5	Maxim Saculțan (MDA)
7	Nick Lee (USA)
8	Haji Aliyev (AZE)
9	Abdulmazhid Kudiev (TJK)
10	Ayub Musaev (BEL)
11	Colin Realbuto (ITA)
12	Alejandro Valdés (CUB)
13	Agustín Destribats (ARG)
14	Adil Ospanov (KAZ)
15	Josh Finesilver (ISR)
16	Edemi Bolkvadze (GEO)
17	Erik Arushanian (UKR)
18	Ibrahim Guzan (YEM)
19	Tömör-Ochiryn Tulga (MGL)
20	Umidjon Jalolov (UZB)
21	Úber Cuero (COL)
22	Austin Gómez (MEX)
23	Ștefan Coman (ROU)
24	Alibeg Alibegov (BRN)
25	Junjun Asebias (FSM)
26	Anuj Kumar (UWW)
27	Cavit Acar (TUR)
28	Carlos Álvarez (ESP)
29	Yuan Shaohua (CHN)
30	Ikromzhon Khadzhimurodov (KGZ)
31	Yoon Seok-ki (KOR)
32	Khamzat Arsamerzouev (FRA)
33	Islam Dudaev (ALB)
34	Alexander Semisorow (GER)
35	Georgii Okorokov (AUS)
36	Krzysztof Bieńkowski (POL)
37	Mikyay Naim (BUL)
38	Niurgun Skriabin (AIN)
39	Yanisse Madi (COM)
40	Nino Leutert (SUI)
41	Levi Nyongesa (KEN)
42	Abdullah Assaf (PLE)
43	Lachlan McNeil (CAN)
44	Ethan Aguigui (GUM)
—	Takuto Otoguro (JPN)

Qualified for the 2024 Summer Olympics
