= 2020 Individual Wrestling World Cup – Men's freestyle 65 kg =

The men's freestyle 65 kilograms is a competition featured at the 2020 Individual Wrestling World Cup, and was held in Belgrade, Serbia on 17 and 18 December 2020.

== Medalists ==
Gold	Vazgen Tevanyan; Armenia
Silver	Iszmail Muszukajev; Hungary
Bronze	Haji Aliyev; Azerbaijan
Bronze	Hor Ohannesian; Ukraine

== Results ==
Legend

- F — Won by fall
- R — Retired
- WO — Won by walkover

1/16 finals
	Score	
Mbundé Cumba (GBS)	WO	~~Hussein Al-Azzani (YEM)~~
Nikolai Okhlopkov (ROU)	11–0	Sixto Auccapiña (PER)
Haji Mohamad Ali (BRN)	6–4	Juan Pablo González (ESP)
Vazgen Tevanyan (ARM)	6–0	Nicolai Grahmez (MDA)

1/8 finals
Ilman Mukhtarov (FRA)	0
Iszmail Muszukajev (HUN)	11
Krzysztof Bieńkowski (POL)	0
Niurgun Skriabin (BLR)	10
Haji Aliyev (AZE)	4
Gadzhimurad Rashidov (RUS)	0^{R}
Ernazar Akmataliev (KGZ)	10
Abdellatif Mansour (ITA)	0
Hor Ohannesian (UKR)	WO
~~Isa Merkja (ALB)~~
Ahmet Duman (TUR)	11
Vladimir Dubov (BUL)	6
Mbunde Cumba (GBS)	0
Nikolai Okhlopkov (ROU)	11
Haji Mohamad Ali (BRN)	0
Vazgen Tevanyan (ARM)	11

Quarterfinals
Iszmail Muszukajev (HUN)	6
Niurgun Skriabin (BLR)	3
Haji Aliyev (AZE)	6
Ernazar Akmataliev (KGZ)	4
Hor Ohannesian (UKR)	8
Ahmet Duman (TUR)	0
Nikolai Okhlopkov (ROU)	0
Vazgen Tevanyan (ARM)	10

Semifinals
Iszmail Muszukajev (HUN)	7
Haji Aliyev (AZE)	6
Hor Ohannesian (UKR)	2
Vazgen Tevanyan (ARM)	7

Final
Iszmail Muszukajev (HUN)	1
Vazgen Tevanyan (ARM)	9

Repechage round 1
Nicolai Grahmez (MDA)	WO
Haji Mohamad Ali (BRN)

Repechage round 2
Ilman Mukhtarov (FRA)	6
Niurgun Skriabin (BLR)	4
Nicolai Grahmez (MDA)	3
Nikolai Okhlopkov (ROU)	2

Bronze medals
Ilman Mukhtarov (FRA)	4
Haji Aliyev (AZE)	10
Nicolai Grahmez (MDA)	1
Hor Ohannesian (UKR)	7
