= Shamil Mamedov =

Bulgarian freestyle wrestler (born 2001)

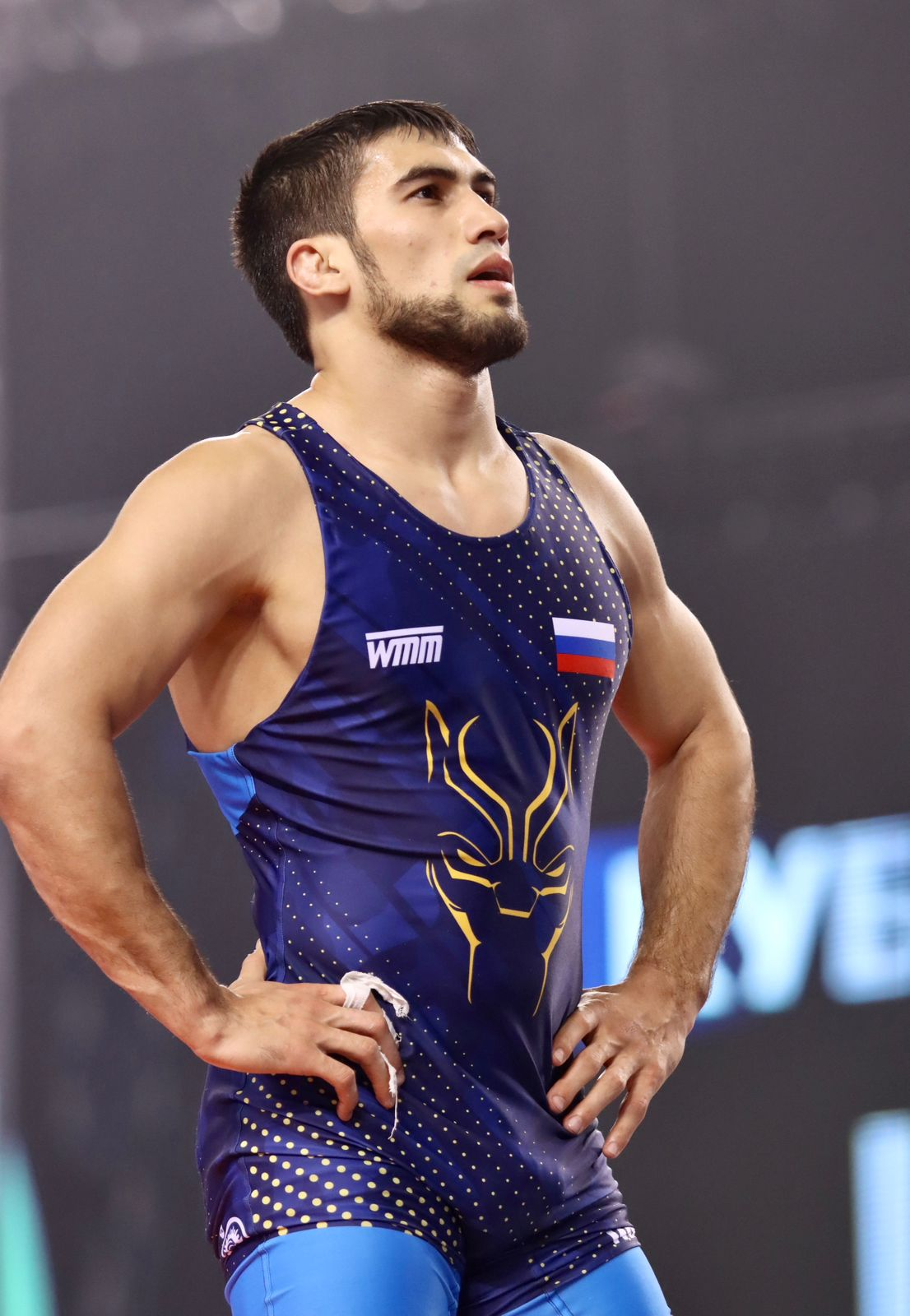
- Mamedov at the 2023 Ivan Yarygin

Personal information
- Native name: Шамиль Мамедов; Шамиль Алиевич Мамедов
- Full name: Shamil Alievich Mamedov
- Born: 8 February 2001 (age 25) Belidzhi, Dagestan, Russia
- Height: 1.70 m (5 ft 7 in)

Sport
- Country: Russia (2018–2024); Bulgaria (2026–present)
- Sport: Amateur wrestling
- Weight class: 65 kg
- Event: Freestyle
- Coached by: Dzhamal Aliev; Vagif Kaziev

Achievements and titles
- World finals: (bronze) (2023)
Medal record
Men's freestyle wrestling
Representing Bulgaria
Grand Prix
Silver medal – second place	2026 Ulaanbaatar	65 kg
Dan Kolov & Nikola Petrov Tournament
Gold medal – first place	2026 Plovdiv	65 kg
Representing Individual Neutral Athletes
World Championships
Bronze medal – third place	2023 Belgrade	65 kg
Representing Russian Wrestling Federation
Yasar Dogu Tournament
Gold medal – first place	2022 Istanbul	65 kg
Representing Russia
Junior World Championships
Gold medal – first place	2021 Ufa	65 kg
Representing Moscow Oblast
Golden Grand Prix Ivan Yarygin
Gold medal – first place	2022 Krasnoyarsk	65 kg
Gold medal – first place	2023 Krasnoyarsk	65 kg
Russian National Championships
Gold medal – first place	2023 Kaspiysk	65 kg
Gold medal – first place	2024 Novoivanovskoye	65 kg

Shamil Mamedov (Russian: Шамиль Алиевич Мамедов; born 8 February 2001) is a Russian-born Bulgarian freestyle wrestler who wrestles in the 65 kg category on the international circuit. He claimed a bronze medal at the 2023 World Championships.

== Early life ==
Shamil was born in the town of Belidzhi, Dagestan, Russia in a family of Lezgin ethnicity. He started wrestling at the age of 6 under his first coach, Minazhudin Kudiev. In his high school years, he moved to Makhachkala and joined the Gamid Gamidov wrestling club. Mamedov is coached by Dzhamal Aliev and Vagif Kaziev.

== Career ==
=== Age-group ===
In 2018, he made the cadet world team and competed at the cadet world championships in Zagreb, Croatia, but he came in fifth.

In 2021, he won the Junior Russian nationals at 65 kg and made the world team, where he came in first at the 2021 World Junior Wrestling Championships, in the final match he beat Ziraddin Bayramov of Azerbaijan.

=== 2022 ===
After the junior world title, On January 28, 2022, he made his senior debut at the Grand Prix Ivan Yarygin 2022, where he placed first at 65 kg. In the final match, he was victorious against his countryman, Ramazan Ferzaliev. One month later, he earned a gold medal at the Yasar Dogu 2022, becoming winner over Olympian Morteza Ghiasi of Iran, world bronze medalist Tömör-Ochiryn Tulga from Mongolia and Russia's world champion Zagir Shakhiev. He met an Olympic bronze medalist Gadzhimurad Rashidov in the final bout of Russian tournament "Spartakiad" in Kazan, on August 26. He won the bout by scores.

=== 2023 ===
In the beginning of 2023 he won the Grand Prix Ivan Yarygin 2023, in the final he faced Gadzhimurad Rashidov again, and won in a close match. On April 26, Shamil met three-time world champion Haji Aliyev of Azerbaijan at Poddubny Wrestling League 4, that was held in Almaty, Kazakhstan. He won the match by the score 7-2. On June 21, he took first place at the 2023 Russian National Championships that were held in Kaspiysk, Dagestan. In the final match he beat his teammate Ibragim Ibragimov by the score 8-2. On September 18, he competed at the 2023 World Championships, where he lost to his countryman Ismail Musuakev (Hungary), but went on to wrestle back and win a bronze medal against Rahman Amouzad of Iran.

=== 2024 ===
In April, he placed first at the Russian nationals, in the final match he over world champion Abasgadzhi Magomedov. In June, he got a quota place for the 2024 Summer Olympics held in Paris, France, as an independent neutral athlete.

=== 2025 ===
In January, Mamedov received a Bulgarian passport, a procedure initiated by the Bulgarian Wrestling Federation in process to switch his sporting allegiance from Russia to Bulgaria. In December, he was granted permission to compete for Bulgaria by the Governing Board of the Bulgarian Wrestling Federation.
