= 2018 World Wrestling Championships – Men's freestyle 65 kg =

Wrestling competition

Men's freestyle 65 kg at the 2018 World Championships
- Venue: László Papp Budapest Sports Arena
- Dates: 21–22 October 2018
- Competitors: 31 from 31 nations

Medalists
gold medal	Takuto Otoguro	Japan
silver medal	Bajrang Punia	India
bronze medal	Akhmed Chakaev	Russia
bronze medal	Alejandro Valdés	Cuba

The men's freestyle 65 kilograms is a competition featured at the 2018 World Wrestling Championships, and was held in Budapest, Hungary on 21 and 22 October.

This freestyle wrestling competition consists of a single-elimination tournament, with a repechage used to determine the winner of two bronze medals. The two finalists face off for gold and silver medals. Each wrestler who loses to one of the two finalists moves into the repechage, culminating in a pair of bronze medal matches featuring the semifinal losers each facing the remaining repechage opponent from their half of the bracket.

Takuto Otoguro from Japan won the gold medal.

== Results ==
Legend

- F — Won by fall

=== Final ===
Final
Takuto Otoguro (JPN)	16
Bajrang Punia (IND)	9

=== Top half ===
Round of 32
Vladimer Khinchegashvili (GEO)	7
Amir Hossein Maghsoudi (IRI)	3
Sirojiddin Khasanov (UZB)	10
Karam Shakir (IRQ)	0
Logan Stieber (USA)	5
Akhmed Chakaev (RUS)	7
George Bucur (ROU)	2
Takuto Otoguro (JPN)	13
Kim Kuk-gwang (PRK)	2
Vasyl Shuptar (UKR)	4
Dimitar Ivanov (BUL)	6^{F}
Yoandrys Grant (JAM)	0
Andrei Prepeliţă (MDA)	10
Michael Asselstine (CAN)	3

Round of 16
Selahattin Kılıçsallayan (TUR)	5
Vladimer Khinchegashvili (GEO)	6
Sirojiddin Khasanov (UZB)	3
Akhmed Chakaev (RUS)	8
Takuto Otoguro (JPN)	11
Vasyl Shuptar (UKR)	0
Dimitar Ivanov (BUL)	7
Andrei Prepeliţă (MDA)	12

Quarterfinals
Vladimer Khinchegashvili (GEO)	0
Akhmed Chakaev (RUS)	10
Takuto Otoguro (JPN)	12
Andrei Prepeliţă (MDA)	2

Semifinals
Akhmed Chakaev (RUS)	10
Takuto Otoguro (JPN)	15

=== Bottom half ===
Round of 32
Haji Aliyev (AZE)	0
Alejandro Valdés (CUB)	2
Juan Pablo González (ESP)	0
Daulet Niyazbekov (KAZ)	10
Maximilian Ausserleitner (AUT)	0
Hasibagena (CHN)	10
Niurgun Skriabin (BLR)	11
Mbundé Cumba (GBS)	2
David Habat (SLO)	0
Tömör-Ochiryn Tulga (MGL)	5^{F}
Magomedmurad Gadzhiev (POL)	9
Valodya Frangulyan (ARM)	2
Masoud Niazi (NED)	0
Lee Seung-chul (KOR)	5
Roman Asharin (HUN)	4
Bajrang Punia (IND)	9

Round of 16
Alejandro Valdés (CUB)	10
Daulet Niyazbekov (KAZ)	0
Hasibagena (CHN)	0
Niurgun Skriabin (BLR)	12
Tömör-Ochiryn Tulga (MGL)	2
Magomedmurad Gadzhiev (POL)	1
Lee Seung-chul (KOR)	0
Bajrang Punia (IND)	4

Quarterfinals
Alejandro Valdés (CUB)	11
Niurgun Skriabin (BLR)	0
Tömör-Ochiryn Tulga (MGL)	3
Bajrang Punia (IND)	5

Semifinals
Alejandro Valdés (CUB)	3
Bajrang Punia (IND)	4

=== Repechage ===
Repechage round 1
George Bucur (ROU)	8
Vasyl Shuptar (UKR)	2
Roman Asharin (HUN)	5
Lee Seung-chul (KOR)	9

Repechage round 2
George Bucur (ROU)	3
Andrei Prepeliţă (MDA)	2
Lee Seung-chul (KOR)	6
Tömör-Ochiryn Tulga (MGL)	4

Bronze medals
George Bucur (ROU)	4
Akhmed Chakaev (RUS)	9
Lee Seung-chul (KOR)	0
Alejandro Valdés (CUB)	10
