= 2026 European Wrestling Championships – Men's freestyle 65 kg =

Wrestling competition

Men's freestyle 65 kg at the 2026 European Wrestling Championships
- Venue: Tirana Olympic Park
- Location: Tirana, Albania
- Dates: 24-25 April
- Competitors: 15

Medalists
gold medal	Bashir Magomedov
silver medal	Islam Dudaev	Albania
bronze medal	Islam Guseinov
bronze medal	Vazgen Tevanyan	Armenia

The men's freestyle 65 kg is a competition featured at the 2026 European Wrestling Championships, and was held in Tirana, Albania on April 24 and 25.

== Results ==
Legend

- F — Won by fall

=== Main bracket ===
Round of 16
Islam Dudaev (ALB)	6^{F}
Ahmet Duman (TUR)	1
Pavel Graur (MDA)	0
Islam Guseinov (UWW)	9
Ștefan Coman (ROU)	1
Gamzatgadzsi Halidov (HUN)	7
Rashid Babazade (AZE)	3
Nico Megerle (GER)	1
Bashir Magomedov (UWW)	11
Ayub Musaev (BEL)	0
Shamil Mamedov (BUL)	12
Mykyta Honcharov (UKR)	3
Vazgen Tevanyan (ARM)	5
Khamzat Arsamerzouev (FRA)	2

Quarterfinals
Nika Zakashvili (GEO)	1
Islam Dudaev (ALB)	3
Islam Guseinov (UWW)	4
Gamzatgadzsi Halidov (HUN)	0
Rashid Babazade (AZE)	2
Bashir Magomedov (UWW)	7
Shamil Mamedov (BUL)	1
Vazgen Tevanyan (ARM)	2

Semifinals
Islam Dudaev (ALB)	4
Islam Guseinov (UWW)	0
Bashir Magomedov (UWW)	3
Vazgen Tevanyan (ARM)	3

Final
Islam Dudaev (ALB)	0
Bashir Magomedov (UWW)	10

=== Repechage ===
Repechage round 1
Ahmet Duman (TUR)	6
Nika Zakashvili (GEO)	6
Ayub Musaev (BEL)	2
Rashid Babazade (AZE)	4

Bronze medal match
Ahmet Duman (TUR)	8
Islam Guseinov (UWW)	9
Rashid Babazade (AZE)	0
Vazgen Tevanyan (ARM)	7

== Final standing ==
Rank	Athlete
1st place, gold medalist(s)	Bashir Magomedov (UWW)
2nd place, silver medalist(s)	Islam Dudaev (ALB)
3rd place, bronze medalist(s)	Islam Guseinov (UWW)
3rd place, bronze medalist(s)	Vazgen Tevanyan (ARM)
5	Ahmet Duman (TUR)
5	Rashid Babazade (AZE)
7	Shamil Mamedov (BUL)
8	Gamzatgadzsi Halidov (HUN)
9	Nika Zakashvili (GEO)
10	Mykyta Honcharov (UKR)
11	Khamzat Arsamerzouev (FRA)
12	Ayub Musaev (BEL)
13	Nico Megerle (GER)
14	Ștefan Coman (ROU)
15	Pavel Graur (MDA)
