= Wrestling at the 2014 Asian Games – Men's freestyle 61 kg =

Men's freestyle 61 kg at the 2014 Asian Games
- Venue: Dowon Gymnasium
- Date: 29 September 2014
- Competitors: 15 from 15 nations

Medalists
gold medal	Masoud Esmaeilpour	Iran
silver medal	Bajrang Punia	India
bronze medal	Lee Seung-chul	South Korea
bronze medal	Noriyuki Takatsuka	Japan

The men's freestyle 61 kilograms wrestling competition at the 2014 Asian Games in Incheon was held on 29 September 2014 at the Dowon Gymnasium.

== Schedule ==
All times are Korea Standard Time (UTC+09:00)

Date	Time	Event
Monday, 29 September 2014	13:00	1/8 finals
Monday, 29 September 2014	13:00	Quarterfinals
Monday, 29 September 2014	13:00	Semifinals
Monday, 29 September 2014	13:00	Repechages
Monday, 29 September 2014	19:00	Finals

== Results ==
Legend

- F — Won by fall

=== Main bracket ===
1/8 finals
Batyr Borjakow (TKM)	1
Daulet Niyazbekov (KAZ)	9
Hussain Gowdooei (QAT)	2
Lee Seung-chul (KOR)	12
Jamshid Kenjaev (UZB)	1
Masoud Esmaeilpour (IRI)	11
Zakaria Abdulhadi (KSA)	1
Nguon Makara (CAM)	12
Hwang Ryong-hak (PRK)	1
Noriyuki Takatsuka (JPN)	3
Farkhodi Usmonzoda (TJK)	10
Esmail Ali Saleh (YEM)	0
Tümenbilegiin Tüvshintulga (MGL)	5
Bajrang Punia (IND)	5

Quarterfinals
Ulan Nadyrbek Uulu (KGZ)	0
Daulet Niyazbekov (KAZ)	3
Lee Seung-chul (KOR)	2
Masoud Esmaeilpour (IRI)	7
Nguon Makara (CAM)	0
Noriyuki Takatsuka (JPN)	3^{F}
Farkhodi Usmonzoda (TJK)	7
Bajrang Punia (IND)	17

Semifinals
Daulet Niyazbekov (KAZ)	3
Masoud Esmaeilpour (IRI)	8
Noriyuki Takatsuka (JPN)	2
Bajrang Punia (IND)	2

Gold medal
Masoud Esmaeilpour (IRI)	6
Bajrang Punia (IND)	4

=== Repechage ===
Repechage
Jamshid Kenjaev (UZB)	7
Lee Seung-chul (KOR)	9
Tümenbilegiin Tüvshintulga (MGL)	8
Farkhodi Usmonzoda (TJK)	0

Bronze medals
Lee Seung-chul (KOR)	12
Daulet Niyazbekov (KAZ)	1
Tümenbilegiin Tüvshintulga (MGL)	2
Noriyuki Takatsuka (JPN)	2

== Final standing ==
Rank	Athlete
1st place, gold medalist(s)	Masoud Esmaeilpour (IRI)
2nd place, silver medalist(s)	Bajrang Punia (IND)
3rd place, bronze medalist(s)	Lee Seung-chul (KOR)
3rd place, bronze medalist(s)	Noriyuki Takatsuka (JPN)
5	Daulet Niyazbekov (KAZ)
5	Tümenbilegiin Tüvshintulga (MGL)
7	Farkhodi Usmonzoda (TJK)
8	Nguon Makara (CAM)
9	Jamshid Kenjaev (UZB)
10	Hussain Gowdooei (QAT)
11	Hwang Ryong-hak (PRK)
12	Batyr Borjakow (TKM)
13	Zakaria Abdulhadi (KSA)
14	Ulan Nadyrbek Uulu (KGZ)
15	Esmail Ali Saleh (YEM)
