= 2019 Wrestling World Cup – Men's freestyle =

Men's freestyle at the 2019 Wrestling World Cup
- Venue: Triumph Gymnastics Center
- Location: Yakutsk, Russia
- Dates: 16–17 March

Medalists
| gold medal | Russia |
| silver medal | Iran |
| bronze medal | United States |

The 2019 Wrestling World Cup - Men's freestyle was the first Wrestling World Cup in 2019 which took place in Yakutsk, Sakha Republic, Russia on March 16–17, 2019. This event took place in the main indoor of Triumph Gymnastics Center, which take Russian nationals 2016.

== Pool stage ==
| Team competes for 1st place |
| Team competes for 3rd place |
| Team competes for 5th place |
| Team competes for 7th place |

=== Pool A ===
| Team | Pld | W | L |
|---|---|---|---|
| Russia | 3 | 3 | 0 |
| Japan | 3 | 2 | 1 |
| Cuba | 3 | 1 | 2 |
| Turkey | 3 | 0 | 3 |

POOL A
Round I

Russia 9 - 1 Cuba
| Weight | Russia | result | Cuba |
|---|---|---|---|
| 57 kg | Aryian Tyutrin | 8 – 3 | Reineri Andreu |
| 61 kg | Zelimkhan Abakarov | 5 – 5 | Yowlys Bonne |
| 65 kg | Gadzhimurad Rashidov | – | by forfeit |
| 70 kg | David Baev | 10 – 0 | Franklin Marén |
| 74 kg | Zaurbek Sidakov | 2^{F} – 0 | Geandry Garzón |
| 79 kg | Khusey Suyunchev | 12 – 1 | Reinier Pérez |
| 86 kg | Dauren Kurugliev | 4 – 0 | Yurieski Torreblanca |
| 92 kg | Magomed Kurbanov | 9 – 7 | Lázaro Hernández |
| 97 kg | Vladislav Baitcaev | 4 – 0 | Reineris Salas |
| 125 kg | Zelimkhan Khizriev | 10 – 0 | Óscar Pino |

Japan 8 - 2 Turkey
| Weight | Japan | result | Turkey |
|---|---|---|---|
| 57 kg | Yuki Takahashi | 13 – 2 | Ali Karaboğa |
| 61 kg | Yudai Fujita | 5 – 1 | Münir Recep Aktaş |
| 65 kg | Daichi Takatani | – | by forfeit |
| 70 kg | Kojiro Shiga | 2 – 7 | Serhat Arslan |
| 74 kg | Yuto Miwa | 4 – 3 | Nazım Kara |
| 79 kg | Yuta Abe | 3 – 0 | Abdulkadir Özmen |
| 86 kg | Sohsuke Takatani | 6^{F} – 0 | Fatih Erdin |
| 92 kg | Atsushi Matsumoto | 2 – 1 | Süleyman Karadeniz |
| 97 kg | Naoya Akaguma | 6 – 3 | Ali Bönceoğlu |
| 125 kg | Nobuyoshi Arakida | 0 – 3 | Abdullah Omaç |

Round II

Russia 8 - 2 Japan
| Weight | Russia | result | Japan |
|---|---|---|---|
| 57 kg | Muslim Sadulaev | 1 – 2 | Yuki Takahashi |
| 61 kg | Zelimkhan Abakrov | 2 – 2 | Yudai Fujita |
| 65 kg | Gadzhimurad Rashidov | 10 – 0 | Daichi Takatani |
| 70 kg | Anzor Zakuev | 11 – 0 | Kojiro Shiga |
| 74 kg | Timur Bizhoev | 11 – 0 | Yuto Miwa |
| 79 kg | Magomed Ramazanov | 10 – 0 | Yuta Abe |
| 86 kg | Vladislav Valiev | 6 – 4 | Sohsuke Takatani |
| 92 kg | Alikhan Zhabrailov | 10 – 0 | Atsushi Matsumoto |
| 97 kg | Vladislav Baitcaev | 6 – 2 | Naoya Akaguma |
| 125 kg | Pavel Krivtsov | 10 – 0 | Katsutoshi Kanazawa |

Cuba 6 - 3 Turkey
| Weight | Cuba | result | Turkey |
|---|---|---|---|
| 57 kg | Reineri Andreu | 5 – 2 | Ali Karaboğa |
| 61 kg | Yowlys Bonne | 1 – 7 | Münir Recep Aktaş |
| 65 kg | Alejandro Valdés | 0^{d} – 0 ^{d} | Cengizhan Erdoğan |
| 70 kg | Franklin Marén | 3 – 0 | Serhat Arslan |
| 74 kg | Geandry Garzón | 2 – 12 | Nazım Kara |
| 79 kg | Reinier Pérez | 2 – 8^{F} | Abdulkadir Özmen |
| 86 kg | Yurieski Torreblanca | – | by forfeit |
| 92 kg | Lázaro Hernández | 4 – 4 | Süleyman Karadeniz |
| 97 kg | Reineris Salas | 11 – 7 | Ali Bönceoğlu |
| 125 kg | Óscar Pino | 8 – 1 | Abdullah Omaç |

Round III

Russia 10 - 0 Turkey
| Weight | Russia | result | Turkey |
|---|---|---|---|
| 57 kg | Muslim Sadulaev | 6^{F} – 1 | Ali Karaboğa |
| 61 kg | Ramazan Ferzaliev | 11 – 2 | Münir Recep Aktaş |
| 65 kg | Viktor Rassadin | – | by forfeit |
| 70 kg | Anzor Zakuev | 6 – 2 | Serhat Arslan |
| 74 kg | Timur Bizhoev | 12^{F} – 0 | Nazım Kara |
| 79 kg | Khusey Suyunchev | 8 – 0 | Abdulkadir Özmen |
| 86 kg | Vladislav Valiev | – | by forfeit |
| 92 kg | Alikhan Zhabrailov | 4 – 0 | Süleyman Karadeniz |
| 97 kg | Rasul Magomedov | 4 – 0 | Ali Bönceoğlu |
| 125 kg | Pavel Krivtsov | 2 – 1 | Abdullah Omaç |

Cuba 5 - 5 df. Japan
| Weight | Cuba | result | Japan |
|---|---|---|---|
| 57 kg | Reineri Andreu | 2 – 2 | Yuki Takahashi |
| 61 kg | Yowlys Bonne | 1 – 1 | Yudai Fujita |
| 65 kg | by forfeit | – | Daichi Takatani |
| 70 kg | Franklin Marén | 2 – 6 | Kojiro Shiga |
| 74 kg | Colombat Rivera | 2 – 6^{F} | Yuto Miwa |
| 79 kg | Reinier Pérez | 4 – 14 | Yuta Abe |
| 86 kg | Yurieski Torreblanca | 5 – 10 | Sohsuke Takatani |
| 92 kg | Lázaro Hernández | 10 – 5 | Atsushi Matsumoto |
| 97 kg | Reineris Salas | 8 – 0 | Naoya Akaguma |
| 125 kg | Óscar Pino | 9^{F} – 0 | Katsutoshi Kanazawa |

=== Pool B ===
| Team | Pld | W | L |
|---|---|---|---|
| Iran | 3 | 3 | 0 |
| United States | 3 | 2 | 1 |
| Mongolia | 3 | 2 | 1 |
| Georgia | 3 | 0 | 3 |

POOL B
Round I

United States 7 - 3 Georgia
| Weight | United States | result | Georgia |
|---|---|---|---|
| 57 kg | Zach Sanders | 1 – 3 | Lasha Lomtadze |
| 61 kg | Nico Megaludis | 12 – 2 | Tornike Katamadze |
| 65 kg | Zain Retherford | 9 – 2 | Amiran Vakhtangashvili |
| 70 kg | Jason Chamerlain | 10 – 0 | Mirza Skhulukhia |
| 74 kg | Isaiah Martinez | 10 – 6 | Zurabi Erbotsonashvili |
| 79 kg | Thomas Gantt | 0 – 11 | Davit Khutsishvili |
| 86 kg | Samuel Brooks | 9^{F} – 0 | Tarzan Maisuradze |
| 92 kg | Hayden Zillmer | 0 – 3 | Dato Marsagishvili |
| 97 kg | Kyven Gadson | 2 – 0 | Mamuka Kordzaia |
| 125 kg | Anthony Nelson | 6 – 0 | Rolandi Andriadze |

Iran 9 - 1 Mongolia
| Weight | Iran | result | Mongolia |
|---|---|---|---|
| 57 kg | Alireza Sarlak | 3 – 2 | Tuvshintulga Tumenbileg |
| 61 kg | Iman Sadeghi | 0 – 4 | Erdenebatyn Bekhbayar |
| 65 kg | Morteza Ghiasi | 8 – 3 | Batmagnai Batchuluun |
| 70 kg | Meysam Nasiri | 7^{F} – 3 | Ganzorigiin Mandakhnaran |
| 74 kg | Reza Afzali | 7 – 0 | Byambadorj Baterdene |
| 79 kg | Mojtaba Asghari | 11 – 0 | Pürevjavyn Önörbat |
| 86 kg | Mersad Marghzari | 5 – 3 | Orgodolyn Üitümen |
| 92 kg | Mohammad Javad Ebrahimi | 10 – 0 | Ulziisaikhan Baasantsogt |
| 97 kg | Alireza Goudarzi | 10 – 0 | Luvsandorjiin Turtogtokh |
| 125 kg | Komeil Ghasemi | 11^{F} – 0 | Khuderbulga Dorjkhand |

Round II

United States 5 - 5.df Iran
| Weight | United States | result | Iran |
|---|---|---|---|
| 57 kg | Zach Sanders | 3 – 4 | Alireza Sarlak |
| 61 kg | Nick Megaludis | 12 – 0 | Iman Sadeghi |
| 65 kg | Zain Retherford | 6 – 1 | Morteza Ghiasi |
| 70 kg | Jason Chamerlain | 0 – 3 | Meysam Nasiri |
| 74 kg | Isaiah Martinez | 6 – 2 | Reza Afzali |
| 79 kg | Thomas Gantt | 11 – 6 | Mojtaba Asghari |
| 86 kg | Samuel Brooks | 4 – 5^{F} | Mersad Marghzari |
| 92 kg | Hayden Zillmer | 6 – 4 | Mohammad Javad Ebrahimi |
| 97 kg | Kyven Gadson | 0 – 4 | Alireza Goudarzi |
| 125 kg | Anthony Nelson | 2 – 6 | Komeil Ghasemi |

Georgia 5 - 5.df Mongolia
| Weight | Georgia | result | Mongolia |
|---|---|---|---|
| 57 kg | Lasha Lomtadze | 8 – 8 | Tuvshintulga Tumenbileg |
| 61 kg | Tornike Katamadze | 0 – 10 | Otgonbaatar Gansukh |
| 65 kg | Amiran Vakhtangashvili | 2 – 9 | Batmagnai Batchuluun |
| 70 kg | Mirza Skhulukhia | 5 – 16 | Byambadorj Enkhbayar |
| 74 kg | Zurabi Erbotsonashvili | 6 – 4 | Byambadorj Baterdene |
| 79 kg | Davit Khutsishvili | 6 – 2 | Bat-Erdene Byambasuren |
| 86 kg | Tarzan Maisuradze | 3 – 4 | Orgodolyn Üitümen |
| 92 kg | Dato Marsagishvili | 11 – 0 | Ulziisaikhan Baasantsogt |
| 97 kg | Mamuka Kordzaia | 3 – 1 | Batzul Ulziisaikhan |
| 125 kg | Rolandi Andriadze | 1 – 1 | Lkhagvagerel Munkhtur |

Round III

United States 8 - 2 Mongolia
| Weight | United States | result | Mongolia |
|---|---|---|---|
| 57 kg | Zane Richards | 0 – 6 | Tuvshintulga Tumenbileg |
| 61 kg | Nicko Megaludis | 6 – 1 | Erdenebatyn Bekhbayar |
| 65 kg | Zain Retherford | 10 – 0 | Batmagnai Batchuluun |
| 70 kg | Jason Chamerlain | 10 – 0 | Byambadorj Enkhbayar |
| 74 kg | Isaiah Martinez | 11 – 0 | Bat-Erdene Byambadorj |
| 79 kg | Thomas Gantt | 14 – 3 | Bat-Erdene Byambasuren |
| 86 kg | Samuel Brooks | 0 – 6^{F} | Orgodolyn Üitümen |
| 92 kg | Hayden Zillmer | 11 – 0 | Ulziisaikhan Baasantsogt |
| 97 kg | Kyven Gadson | 8 – 0 | Batzul Ulziisaikhan |
| 125 kg | 'Anthony Nelson | 9 – 0 | Lkhagvagerel Munkhtur |

Georgia 2 - 8 Iran
| Weight | Georgia | result | Iran |
|---|---|---|---|
| 57 kg | by forfeit | – | Alireza Sarlak |
| 61 kg | by forfeit | – | Iman Sadeghi |
| 65 kg | Amiran Vakhtangashvili | 0 – 8^{F} | Morteza Ghiasi |
| 70 kg | Mirza Skhulukhia | 2 – 12 | Meysam Nasiri |
| 74 kg | Zurabi Erbotsonashvili | 0 – 10^{F} | Reza Afzali |
| 79 kg | Davit Khutsishvili | 2 – 1 | Mojtaba Asghari |
| 86 kg | Tarzan Maisuradze | 8 – 12 | Mersad Marghzari |
| 92 kg | Dato Marsagishvili | 6 – 2 | Mohammad Javad Ebrahimi |
| 97 kg | Mamuka Kordazia | 0 – 3 | Alireza Goudarzi |
| 125 kg | Rolandi Andriadze | 0 – 10 | Komeil Ghasemi |

== Medal matches ==
Medal Matches
First-Place Match

Russia 9 - 1 Iran
| Weight | Russia | result | Iran |
|---|---|---|---|
| 57 kg | Aryian Tyutrin | 11 – 2 | Alireza Sarlak |
| 61 kg | Ramazan Ferzaliev | 8 – 2 | Iman Sadeghi |
| 65 kg | Viktor Rassadin | 10 – 2 | Morteza Ghiasi |
| 70 kg | David Baev | 6 – 1 | Meysam Nasiri |
| 74 kg | Zaurbek Sidakov | 6 – 0 | Reza Afzali |
| 79 kg | Magomed Ramazanov | 4^{F} – 0 | Mojtaba Asghari |
| 86 kg | Dauren Kurugliev | 10 – 0 | Mersad Marghzari |
| 92 kg | Magomed Kurbanov | 1 – 2 | Mohammad Javad Ebrahimi |
| 97 kg | Vladislav Baitcaev | 2 – 1 | Alireza Goudarzi |
| 125 kg | Zelimkhan Khizriev | 10 – 0 | Amin Taheri |

Third-Place Match

United States 6 - 4 Japan
| Weight | United States | result | Japan |
|---|---|---|---|
| 57 kg | Zach Sanders | – | by forfeit |
| 61 kg | Nick Megaludis | 4 – 4 | Yudai Fujita |
| 65 kg | Zain Retherford | 10 – 0 | Daichi Takatani |
| 70 kg | Jason Chamerlain | 3 – 5 | Kojiro Shiga |
| 74 kg | Isaiah Martinez | 10 – 0 | Yuto Miwa |
| 79 kg | Thomas Gantt | 2 – 3 | Yuta Abe |
| 86 kg | Samuel Brooks | 3 – 14 | Sohsuke Takatani |
| 92 kg | Hayden Zillmer | 10 – 0 | Atsushi Matsumoto |
| 97 kg | Kyven Gadson | 3 – 2 | Naoya Akaguma |
| 125 kg | 'Anthony Nelson | 5 – 3 | Nobuyoshi Arakida |

Fifth-Place Match

Cuba 6 - 4 Mongolia
| Weight | Cuba | result | Mongolia |
|---|---|---|---|
| 57 kg | Reineri Andreu | 1 – 2 | Tuvshintulga Tumenbileg |
| 61 kg | Yowlys Bonne | 3 – 2 | Otgonbaatar Gansukh |
| 65 kg | by forfeit | – | Batmagnai Batchuluun |
| 70 kg | Franklin Marén | 4 – 0 | Byambadorj Enkhbayar |
| 74 kg | Geandry Garzón | 3 – 8^{F} | Bat-Erdene Byambadorj |
| 79 kg | Reinier Pérez | 10 – 0 | Bat-Erdene Byambasuren |
| 86 kg | Yurieski Torreblanca | 4 – 4 | Orgodolyn Üitümen |
| 92 kg | Lázaro Hernández | 11 – 0 | Ulziisaikhan Baasantsogt |
| 97 kg | Reineris Salas | 2 – 0 | Batzul Ulziisaikhan |
| 125 kg | Óscar Pino | 5 – 2 | Khuderbulga Dorjkhand |

Seventh-Place Match

Georgia 8 - 2 Turkey
| Weight | Georgia | result | Turkey |
|---|---|---|---|
| 57 kg | by forfeit | – | Ali Karaboğa |
| 61 kg | by forfeit | – | Münir Recep Aktaş |
| 65 kg | Amiran Vakhtangashvili | – | by forfeit |
| 70 kg | Mirza Skhulukhia | 11 – 0 | Serhat Arslan |
| 74 kg | Zurabi Erbotsonashvili | 11 – 0 | Nazım Kara |
| 79 kg | Davit Khutsishvili | 7 – 2 | Abdulkadir Özmen |
| 86 kg | Tarzan Maisuradze | – | by forfeit |
| 92 kg | Dato Marsagishvili | 6 – 2 | Süleyman Karadeniz |
| 97 kg | Mamuka Kordzaia | 9 – 6 | Ali Bönceoğlu |
| 125 kg | Rolandi Andriadze | 6 – 5 | Abdullah Omaç |

== Final classement ==
| Team | Pld | W | L |
|---|---|---|---|
| Russia | 4 | 4 | 0 |
| Iran | 4 | 3 | 1 |
| United States | 4 | 3 | 1 |
| Japan | 4 | 2 | 2 |
| Cuba | 4 | 2 | 2 |
| Mongolia | 4 | 1 | 3 |
| Georgia | 4 | 1 | 4 |
| Turkey | 4 | 0 | 4 |
