= 2022 World Wrestling Championships – Men's freestyle 65 kg =

Wrestling competitions

Men's freestyle 65 kg at the 2022 World Championships
- Venue: Štark Arena
- Dates: 17–18 September 2022
- Competitors: 27 from 27 nations

Medalists
gold medal	Rahman Amouzad	Iran
silver medal	Yianni Diakomihalis	United States
bronze medal	Iszmail Muszukajev	Hungary
bronze medal	Bajrang Punia	India

The men's freestyle 65 kilograms is a competition featured at the 2022 World Wrestling Championships, and was held in Belgrade, Serbia on 17 and 18 September 2022.

This freestyle wrestling competition consists of a single-elimination tournament, with a repechage used to determine the winner of two bronze medals. The two finalists face off for gold and silver medals. Each wrestler who loses to one of the two finalists moves into the repechage, culminating in a pair of bronze medal matches featuring the semifinal losers each facing the remaining repechage opponent from their half of the bracket.

== Results ==
=== Final ===
Final
Rahman Amouzad (IRI)	13
Yianni Diakomihalis (USA)	8

=== Top half ===
Round of 32
Beka Lomtadze (GEO)	1
Agustín Destribats (ARG)	9
Kaiki Yamaguchi (JPN)	12
Erik Arushanian (UKR)	2
Lachlan McNeil (CAN)	2
Abbos Rakhmonov (UZB)	5
Vitalie Bunici (MDA)	1
Adil Ospanov (KAZ)	4
Rahman Amouzad (IRI)	8
Yun Jun-sik (KOR)	1

Round of 16
Haji Aliyev (AZE)	6
Agustín Destribats (ARG)	1
Kaiki Yamaguchi (JPN)	5
Abbos Rakhmonov (UZB)	5
Alibek Osmonov (KGZ)	3
Adil Ospanov (KAZ)	6
Rahman Amouzad (IRI)	6
Iszmail Muszukajev (HUN)	0

Quarterfinals
Haji Aliyev (AZE)	10
Abbos Rakhmonov (UZB)	3
Adil Ospanov (KAZ)	2
Rahman Amouzad (IRI)	13

Semifinals
Haji Aliyev (AZE)	2
Rahman Amouzad (IRI)	9

=== Bottom half ===
Round of 32
Cavit Acar (TUR)	10
Arman Eloyan (FRA)	10
Tseveensürengiin Tsogbadrakh (MGL)	7
Mbundé Cumba (GBS)	0
Ștefan Coman (ROU)	2
Krzysztof Bieńkowski (POL)	5
Vazgen Tevanyan (ARM)	0
Yianni Diakomihalis (USA)	4
Alexander Semisorow (GER)	0
Vladimir Dubov (BUL)	3
Alejandro Valdés (CUB)	10
Yuan Shaohua (CHN)	0

Round of 16
Sebastian Rivera (PUR)	11
Cavit Acar (TUR)	1
Tseveensürengiin Tsogbadrakh (MGL)	3
Krzysztof Bieńkowski (POL)	0
Yianni Diakomihalis (USA)	10
Vladimir Dubov (BUL)	0
Alejandro Valdés (CUB)	4
Bajrang Punia (IND)	5

Quarterfinals
Sebastian Rivera (PUR)	8
Tseveensürengiin Tsogbadrakh (MGL)	1
Yianni Diakomihalis (USA)	10
Bajrang Punia (IND)	0

Semifinals
Sebastian Rivera (PUR)	0
Yianni Diakomihalis (USA)	10

=== Repechage ===
Repechage round 1
Yun Jun-sik (KOR)	4
Iszmail Muszukajev (HUN)	5
Vazgen Tevanyan (ARM)	10
Vladimir Dubov (BUL)	0

Repechage round 2
Iszmail Muszukajev (HUN)	13
Adil Ospanov (KAZ)	0
Vazgen Tevanyan (ARM)	6
Bajrang Punia (IND)	7

Bronze medals
Iszmail Muszukajev (HUN)	4
Haji Aliyev (AZE)	2
Bajrang Punia (IND)	11
Sebastian Rivera (PUR)	9

== Final standing ==
Rank	Athlete
1st place, gold medalist(s)	Rahman Amouzad (IRI)
2nd place, silver medalist(s)	Yianni Diakomihalis (USA)
3rd place, bronze medalist(s)	Iszmail Muszukajev (HUN)
3rd place, bronze medalist(s)	Bajrang Punia (IND)
5	Haji Aliyev (AZE)
5	Sebastian Rivera (PUR)
7	Abbos Rakhmonov (UZB)
8	Adil Ospanov (KAZ)
9	Tseveensürengiin Tsogbadrakh (MGL)
10	Kaiki Yamaguchi (JPN)
11	Vazgen Tevanyan (ARM)
12	Alejandro Valdés (CUB)
13	Cavit Acar (TUR)
14	Agustín Destribats (ARG)
15	Krzysztof Bieńkowski (POL)
16	Vladimir Dubov (BUL)
17	Yun Jun-sik (KOR)
18	Arman Eloyan (FRA)
19	Alibek Osmonov (KGZ)
20	Lachlan McNeil (CAN)
21	Ștefan Coman (ROU)
22	Erik Arushanian (UKR)
23	Vitalie Bunici (MDA)
24	Beka Lomtadze (GEO)
25	Alexander Semisorow (GER)
26	Mbundé Cumba (GBS)
27	Yuan Shaohua (CHN)
