= Wrestling at the 2020 Summer Olympics – Men's freestyle 65 kg =

Men's freestyle 65 kg at the Games of the XXXII Olympiad
- Venue: Makuhari Messe
- Date: 6–7 August 2021
- Competitors: 16 from 16 nations

Medalists
1st place, gold medalist(s)		Takuto Otoguro	Japan
2nd place, silver medalist(s)		Haji Aliyev	Azerbaijan
3rd place, bronze medalist(s)		Gadzhimurad Rashidov	ROC
3rd place, bronze medalist(s)		Bajrang Punia	India

The men's freestyle 65 kilograms competition at the 2020 Summer Olympics in Tokyo, Japan, took place on 6–7 August 2021 at the Makuhari Messe in Mihama-ku.

This freestyle wrestling competition consists of a single-elimination tournament, with a repechage used to determine the winner of two bronze medals. The two finalists face off for gold and silver medals. Each wrestler who loses to one of the two finalists moves into the repechage, culminating in a pair of bronze medal matches featuring the semifinal losers each facing the remaining repechage opponent from their half of the bracket.

== Schedule ==
All times are Japan Standard Time (UTC+9:00)

Date	Time	Event
6 August 2021	11:00	Qualification rounds
6 August 2021	18:15	Semifinals
7 August 2021	18:45	Repechage
7 August 2021	19:30	Finals

== Results ==
Legend

- F — Won by fall

=== Main bracket ===
1/8 finals
Gadzhimurad Rashidov (ROC)	6
Vazgen Tevanyan (ARM)	0
Georgios Pilidis (GRE)	0
Magomedmurad Gadzhiev (POL)	11
Takuto Otoguro (JPN)	6
Tömör-Ochiryn Tulga (MGL)	3
Agustín Destribats (ARG)	6
Iszmail Muszukajev (HUN)	9
Daulet Niyazbekov (KAZ)	21
Alejandro Valdés (CUB)	11
Adama Diatta (SEN)	0
Haji Aliyev (AZE)	4
Haithem Dakhlaoui (TUN)	1
Morteza Ghiasi (IRI)	5
Ernazar Akmataliev (KGZ)	3
Bajrang Punia (IND)	3

1/4 finals
Gadzhimurad Rashidov (ROC)	6
Magomedmurad Gadzhiev (POL)	2
Takuto Otoguro (JPN)	4
Iszmail Muszukajev (HUN)	1
Daulet Niyazbekov (KAZ)	1
Haji Aliyev (AZE)	9
Morteza Ghiasi (IRI)	1
Bajrang Punia (IND)	2^{F}

Semifinals
Gadzhimurad Rashidov (ROC)	2
Takuto Otoguro (JPN)	3
Haji Aliyev (AZE)	12
Bajrang Punia (IND)	5

Final
Takuto Otoguro (JPN)	5
Haji Aliyev (AZE)	4

=== Repechage ===
Repechage
Tömör-Ochiryn Tulga (MGL)	2
Iszmail Muszukajev (HUN)	4
Adama Diatta (SEN)	0
Daulet Niyazbekov (KAZ)	10

Bronze medal matches
Iszmail Muszukajev (HUN)	0
Gadzhimurad Rashidov (ROC)	5
Daulet Niyazbekov (KAZ)	0
Bajrang Punia (IND)	8

== Final standing ==
Rank	Athlete
1st place, gold medalist(s)	Takuto Otoguro (JPN)
2nd place, silver medalist(s)	Haji Aliyev (AZE)
3rd place, bronze medalist(s)	Gadzhimurad Rashidov (ROC)
3rd place, bronze medalist(s)	Bajrang Punia (IND)
5	Iszmail Muszukajev (HUN)
5	Daulet Niyazbekov (KAZ)
7	Magomedmurad Gadzhiev (POL)
8	Morteza Ghiasi (IRI)
9	Tömör-Ochiryn Tulga (MGL)
10	Alejandro Valdés (CUB)
11	Agustín Destribats (ARG)
12	Ernazar Akmataliev (KGZ)
13	Haithem Dakhlaoui (TUN)
14	Vazgen Tevanyan (ARM)
15	Georgios Pilidis (GRE)
16	Adama Diatta (SEN)
