= 2022 European Wrestling Championships – Men's freestyle 65 kg =

Wrestling competition

Men's freestyle 65 kg at the 2022 European Wrestling Championships
- Venue: BOK Sports Hall
- Location: Budapest, Hungary
- Dates: 28-29 March
- Competitors: 13

Medalists
gold medal	Iszmail Muszukajev	Hungary
silver medal	Haji Aliyev	Azerbaijan
bronze medal	Münir Recep Aktaş	Turkey
bronze medal	Islam Dudaev	Albania

The men's freestyle 65 kg was a competition featured at the 2022 European Wrestling Championships, and was held in Budapest, Hungary on March 28 and 29.

== Results ==
Legend

- F — Won by fall

=== Main Bracket ===
1/8 finals
Münir Recep Aktaş (TUR)	11
Quentin Sticker (FRA)	0
Vladimir Dubov (BUL)	1
Maxim Saculțan (MDA)	2
Ștefan Coman (ROU)	1
Beka Lomtadze (GEO)	3
Adam Vella (MLT)	0
Islam Dudaev (ALB)	10
Gevorg Tadevosyan (ARM)	6
Stevan Mićić (SRB)	4

Quarterfinals
Haji Aliyev (AZE)	12
Münir Recep Aktaş (TUR)	6
Maxim Saculțan (MDA)	13
Beka Lomtadze (GEO)	3
Iszmail Muszukajev (HUN)	10
Islam Dudaev (ALB)	0
Gevorg Tadevosyan (ARM)	0
Krzysztof Bieńkowski (POL)	4

Semifinals
Haji Aliyev (AZE)	12
Maxim Saculțan (MDA)	2
Iszmail Muszukajev (HUN)	11
Krzysztof Bieńkowski (POL)	0

Final
Haji Aliyev (AZE)	1
Iszmail Muszukajev (HUN)	12

=== Repechage ===
Bronze medal match
Münir Recep Aktaş (TUR)	4^{F}
Maxim Saculțan (MDA)	0
Islam Dudaev (ALB)	5
Krzysztof Bieńkowski (POL)	0

== Final standing ==
Rank	Wrestler	UWW Points
1st place, gold medalist(s)	Iszmail Muszukajev (HUN)	13000
2nd place, silver medalist(s)	Haji Aliyev (AZE)	11000
3rd place, bronze medalist(s)	Münir Recep Aktaş (TUR)	9500
3rd place, bronze medalist(s)	Islam Dudaev (ALB)	9500
5	Krzysztof Bieńkowski (POL)	8000
5	Maxim Saculțan (MDA)	8000
7	Beka Lomtadze (GEO)	7400
8	Gevorg Tadevosyan (ARM)	7000
9	Stevan Mićić (SRB)	6500
10	Vladimir Dubov (BUL)	6100
11	Ștefan Coman (ROU)	4000
12	Adam Vella (MLT)	3800
13	Quentin Sticker (FRA)	3600
