= 2014 Dan Kolov & Nikola Petrov Tournament =

Dan Kolov & Nikola Petrov 2014
- Host city: Sofia, Bulgaria
- Dates: 21–23 February

Champions
- Freestyle: Bulgaria
- Greco-Roman: Bulgaria
- Women: Turkey

The 52nd Dan Kolov & Nikola Petrov Tournament was a sport wrestling event held in Sofia, Bulgaria between 21 and 23 February 2014.

This international tournament includes competition in both men's and women's freestyle wrestling and men's Greco-Roman wrestling. This tournament is held in honor of Dan Kolov who was the first European freestyle wrestling champion from Bulgaria and European and World Champion Nikola Petroff.

== Medal table ==
Rank	Nation	Gold	Silver	Bronze	Total
1	Azerbaijan	5	0	2	7
2	Turkey	4	4	8	16
3	Bulgaria	3	9	5	17
4	Armenia	3	1	3	7
5	Ukraine	2	4	5	11
6	Russia	2	2	3	7
7	Germany	1	1	4	6
8	Puerto Rico	1	0	1	2
9	Great Britain	1	0	0	1
9	Moldova	1	0	0	1
9	Mongolia	1	0	0	1
12	Poland	0	1	2	3
13	Egypt	0	1	0	1
13	Greece	0	1	0	1
15	Romania	0	0	6	6
16	Brazil	0	0	2	2
17	Belgium	0	0	1	1
17	China	0	0	1	1
17	Estonia	0	0	1	1
17	Finland	0	0	1	1
17	Israel	0	0	1	1
17	Macedonia	0	0	1	1
17	Switzerland	0	0	1	1
Totals (23 entries)		24	24	48	96

== Team ranking ==
Rank	Men's freestyle		Men's Greco-Roman		Women's freestyle	
Rank	Team	Points	Team	Points	Team	Points
1	Bulgaria	78	Bulgaria	97	Turkey	65
2	Turkey	70	Ukraine	69	Bulgaria	64
3	Azerbaijan	69	Armenia	64	Ukraine	57
4	Poland	38	Turkey	53	Russia	47
5	Russia	31	Russia	39	Germany	45

== Medal overview ==
=== Men's freestyle ===
Event	Gold	Silver	Bronze
57 kg	Krasimir Krastanov; Great Britain	Mikhail Ivanov; Russia	Andrei Dukov; Romania
57 kg	Krasimir Krastanov; Great Britain	Mikhail Ivanov; Russia	Ruslan Surkhaev; Azerbaijan
61 kg	Haji Aliyev; Azerbaijan	Münir Recep Aktaş; Turkey	Krzysztof Bieńkowski; Poland
61 kg	Haji Aliyev; Azerbaijan	Münir Recep Aktaş; Turkey	Vladimir Dubov; Bulgaria
65 kg	Franklin Gómez; Puerto Rico	Borislav Novachkov; Bulgaria	George Bucur; Romania
65 kg	Franklin Gómez; Puerto Rico	Borislav Novachkov; Bulgaria	Servet Coşkun; Turkey
70 kg	Ruslan Dibirgadjiyev; Azerbaijan	Miroslav Kirov; Bulgaria	Yakup Gör; Turkey
70 kg	Ruslan Dibirgadjiyev; Azerbaijan	Miroslav Kirov; Bulgaria	Haiwei Ling; China
74 kg	Leonid Bazan; Bulgaria	Krystian Brzozowski; Poland	Soner Demirtaş; Turkey
74 kg	Leonid Bazan; Bulgaria	Krystian Brzozowski; Poland	Jabrayil Hasanov; Azerbaijan
86 kg	Gamzat Osmanov; Azerbaijan	Fırat Binici; Turkey	Radosław Marcinkiewicz; Poland
86 kg	Gamzat Osmanov; Azerbaijan	Fırat Binici; Turkey	Jaime Yusept Espinal; Puerto Rico
97 kg	Sharif Sharifov; Azerbaijan	Rıza Yıldırım; Turkey	Lyuben Iliev; Bulgaria
97 kg	Sharif Sharifov; Azerbaijan	Rıza Yıldırım; Turkey	İbrahim Bölükbaşı; Turkey
125 kg	Jamaladdin Magomedov; Azerbaijan	Alen Zasieiev; Ukraine	Andranik Galstyan; Armenia
125 kg	Jamaladdin Magomedov; Azerbaijan	Alen Zasieiev; Ukraine	Boban Danov; Macedonia

=== Greco-Roman ===
Event	Gold	Silver	Bronze
59 kg	Aleksandar Kostadinov; Bulgaria	Karen Aslanyan; Armenia	Rahman Bilici; Turkey
59 kg	Aleksandar Kostadinov; Bulgaria	Karen Aslanyan; Armenia	Radoslav Vasilev; Bulgaria
66 kg	Aram Julfalakyan; Armenia	Asker Orshokdugov; Russia	Abdulsamet Uğurlu; Turkey
66 kg	Aram Julfalakyan; Armenia	Asker Orshokdugov; Russia	Konstantin Stas; Bulgaria
71 kg	Abuyazid Mantsigov; Russia	Armen Vardanyan; Ukraine	Matthias Maasch; Germany
71 kg	Abuyazid Mantsigov; Russia	Armen Vardanyan; Ukraine	Ionel Puscasu; Romania
75 kg	Arsen Julfalakyan; Armenia	Ilian Georgiev; Bulgaria	Nikolai Daragan; Ukraine
75 kg	Arsen Julfalakyan; Armenia	Ilian Georgiev; Bulgaria	Karapet Chalyan; Armenia
80 kg	Imil Sharafedinov; Russia	Pascal Eisele; Germany	Jonas Bossert; Switzerland
80 kg	Imil Sharafedinov; Russia	Pascal Eisele; Germany	Aleksander Shyshman; Ukraine
85 kg	Zhan Beleniuk; Ukraine	Nikolay Bayryakov; Bulgaria	Ahmet Yıldırım; Turkey
85 kg	Zhan Beleniuk; Ukraine	Nikolay Bayryakov; Bulgaria	Maksim Manukyan; Armenia
98 kg	Artur Aleksanyan; Armenia	Vladimir Vasilev; Ukraine	Ardo Arusaar; Estonia
98 kg	Artur Aleksanyan; Armenia	Vladimir Vasilev; Ukraine	Alin Alexuc-Ciurariu; Romania
130 kg	Atilla Güzel; Turkey	Miloslav Metodiev; Bulgaria	Lyubomir Dimitrov; Bulgaria
130 kg	Atilla Güzel; Turkey	Miloslav Metodiev; Bulgaria	Ioseb Chugoshvili; Belarus

=== Women's freestyle ===
Event	Gold	Silver	Bronze
48 kg	Sümeyye Zeybek; Turkey	Elitsa Yankova; Bulgaria	Lyubov Kuzmina; Russia
48 kg	Sümeyye Zeybek; Turkey	Elitsa Yankova; Bulgaria	Sarianne Savola; Finland
53 kg	Natalia Budu; Moldova	Maria Prevolaraki; Greece	Ekaterina Krasnova; Russia
53 kg	Natalia Budu; Moldova	Maria Prevolaraki; Greece	Larisa Skoblyuk; Ukraine
55 kg	Bediha Gün; Turkey	Evelina Nikolova; Bulgaria	Tetyana Kit; Ukraine
58 kg	Elif Jale Yeşilırmak; Turkey	Mimi Hristova; Bulgaria	Joice Silva; Brazil
60 kg	Tetyana Lavrenchuk; Ukraine	Hafize Şahin; Turkey	Natalya Fedoseeva; Russia
60 kg	Tetyana Lavrenchuk; Ukraine	Hafize Şahin; Turkey	Georgiana Filip; Romania
63 kg	Taybe Yusein; Bulgaria	Dzhanan Manolova; Bulgaria	Buse Tosun; Turkey
63 kg	Taybe Yusein; Bulgaria	Dzhanan Manolova; Bulgaria	Svetlana Ryzhykova; Ukraine
69 kg	Aline Rotter-Focken; Germany	Oksana Vashchuk; Ukraine	Adina Popescu; Romania
69 kg	Aline Rotter-Focken; Germany	Oksana Vashchuk; Ukraine	Ilana Kratysh; Israel
75 kg	Ochirbatyn Burmaa; Mongolia	Nadia Antar; Egypt	Maria Selmaier; Germany
75 kg	Ochirbatyn Burmaa; Mongolia	Nadia Antar; Egypt	Aline Ferreira; Brazil

== Participating nations ==
351 competitors from 35 nations participated.

- Algeria (13)
- Armenia (17)
- Azerbaijan (8)
- Brazil (7)
- Belarus (2)
- Bulgaria (64)
- China (6)
- Spain (2)
- Estonia (3)
- Egypt (5)
- Finland (3)
- France (2)
- United Kingdom (1)
- Germany (20)
- Greece (8)
- Israel (9)
- Italy (1)
- Jordan (1)
- Japan (3)
- Moldova (2)
- Mongolia (1)
- Macedonia (5)
- Poland (10)
- Puerto Rico (15)
- Romania (25)
- Russia (23)
- Slovenia (1)
- Serbia (6)
- Switzerland (2)
- Slovakia (4)
- Sweden (4)
- Tunisia (6)
- Turkey (36)
- Ukraine (30)
- United States (6)
