= Mbundé Cumba =

Bissau-Guinean freestyle wrestler

Mbunde Cumba
Personal information
- Full name: Mbunde Cumba Mbali
- Nationality: Bissau-Guinean
- Born: 25 April 1991 (age 35)

Sport
- Sport: Wrestling
- Event: Freestyle
Medal record
Representing Guinea-Bissau
Men's Freestyle wrestling
African Games
Silver medal – second place	2019 El Jadida	65 kg
African Championships
Gold medal – first place	2020 Algiers	65 kg
Gold medal – first place	2019 Hammamet	65 kg
Gold medal – first place	2022 El Jadida	65 kg
Bronze medal – third place	2017 Marrakesh	61 kg
Bronze medal – third place	2016 Alexandria	65 kg
Islamic Solidarity Games
Bronze medal – third place	2017 Baku	65 kg
- Updated on 10 February 2020

Mbunde Cumba Mbali (born 25 April 1991) is a Bissau-Guinean freestyle wrestler. He is three time African Championships winner (in 2019, 2020 and 2022) at the Freestyle 65 kg category.

== Major results ==
Year	Tournament	Venue	Result	Event
2016	African Championships	Alexandria, Egypt	3rd	Freestyle 65 kg
2017	African Championships	Marrakesh, Morocco	3rd	Freestyle 61 kg
2017	Islamic Solidarity Games	Baku, Azerbaijan	3rd	Freestyle 65 kg
2018	African Championships	Port Harcourt, Nigeria	5th	Freestyle 65 kg
2018	World Championships	Budapest, Hungary	24th	Freestyle 65 kg
2019	African Championships	Hammamet, Tunisia	1st	Freestyle 65 kg
2019	African Games	El Jadida, Morocco	2nd	Freestyle 65 kg
2019	World Championships	Nur-Sultan, Kazakhstan	25th	Freestyle 65 kg
2020	African Championships	Algiers, Algeria	1st	Freestyle 65 kg
2022	African Championships	El Jadida, Morocco	1st	Freestyle 65 kg
2022	World Championships	Belgrade, Serbia	26th	Freestyle 65 kg
