= Münir Recep Aktaş =

Turkish freestyle wrestler

Personal information
- Born: 26 June 1989 (age 37) Erzurum, Turkey
- Height: 1.70 m (5 ft 7 in)
- Weight: 65 kg (143 lb; 10.2 st)

Sport
- Country: Turkey
- Sport: Amateur wrestling
- Event: Freestyle
- Club: Ankara ASKİ
Medal record
Men's freestyle wrestling
Representing Turkey
European Championships
Bronze medal – third place	2022 Budapest	65 kg
World Cup
Silver medal – second place	2013 Tehran	60 kg
Yasar Dogu Tournament
Silver medal – second place	2019 Istanbul	61 kg
Silver medal – second place	2015 Istanbul	61 kg
Silver medal – second place	2011 Istanbul	60 kg
Bronze medal – third place	2020 Istanbul	61 kg
Dan Kolov - Nikola Petrov Tournament
Silver medal – second place	2017 Russe	61 kg
Silver medal – second place	2014 Sofia	61 kg
World University Championship
Bronze medal – third place	2012 Kuortane	60 kg
European Cadets Championships
Gold medal – first place	2006 Istanbul	46 kg

Münir Recep Aktaş (born 26 June 1989) is a Turkish freestyle wrestler competing in the 65 kg division. He is a member of Ankara ASKİ.

== Career ==
In 2022, he won one of the bronze medals in the men's 65 kg event at the European Wrestling Championships held in Budapest, Hungary.

He lost his bronze medal match in the 65 kg event at the 2022 Mediterranean Games held in Oran, Algeria.

== Major results ==
Year	Tournament	Location	Result	Event
2022	European Championships	Budapest, Hungary	3rd	Freestyle 65 kg
