= Lee Seung-chul (wrestler) =

South Korean wrestler (born 1988)

Personal information
- Native name: 이승철
- Nationality: South Korea
- Born: 22 July 1988 (age 38) Jeonnam, South Korea
- Height: 174 cm (5 ft 9 in)

Sport
- Country: South Korea
- Sport: Wrestling
- Weight class: 74 kg
- Event: Freestyle

Achievements and titles
- Olympic finals: 18th(2012)
- World finals: 5th(2018)
- Regional finals: (silver) (2017) (bronze) (2010)
Medal record
Men's freestyle wrestling
Representing South Korea
Asian Games
Bronze medal – third place	2014 Incheon	61 kg
Asian Championships
Silver medal – second place	2017 New Delhi	65 kg
Bronze medal – third place	2010 New Delhi	60 kg
Asian Juniors Championships
Bronze medal – third place	2005 Jeu Island	50 kg
Asian Cadets Championships
Silver medal – second place	2003 Feng Yuang	42 kg
Bronze medal – third place	2005 Oarai	50 kg

Lee Seung-Chul (born 22 July 1988 in Jeollanam) is a South Korean wrestler who competed at the 2012 Summer Olympics in the men's -60 kg freestyle category.
