= Masoud Esmaeilpour =

Iranian wrestler (born 1988)

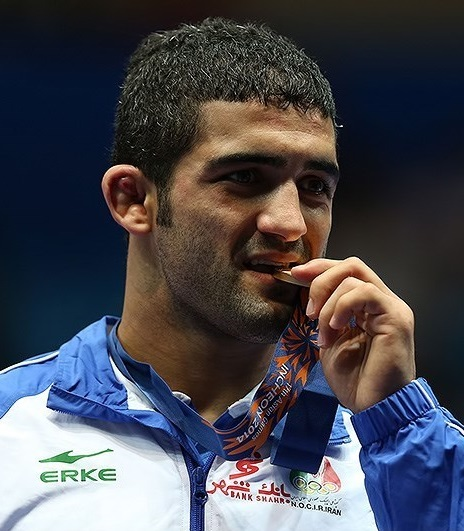

Personal information
- Native name: مسعود اسماعیل پور
- Full name: Masoud Esmaeilpour Jouybari
- Nationality: Iran
- Born: 6 August 1988 (age 37) Jouybar, Iran
- Height: 1.70 m (5 ft 7 in)
- Weight: 60 kg (132 lb)

Sport
- Coached by: Mahmoud Esmaeilpour
Medal record
Men's freestyle wrestling
Representing Iran
World Championships
Silver medal – second place	2014 Tashkent	61 kg
Bronze medal – third place	2013 Budapest	60 kg
Asian Games
Gold medal – first place	2014 Incheon	61 kg
Asian Championships
Gold medal – first place	2010 New Delhi	60 kg
Gold medal – first place	2014 Astana	61 kg
Gold medal – first place	2015 Doha	65 kg
Silver medal – second place	2012 Gumi	60 kg
Bronze medal – third place	2009 Pattaya	60 kg
Islamic Solidarity Games
Bronze medal – third place	2017 Baku	61 kg

Masoud Esmaeilpour Jouybari (Persian: مسعود اسماعیل‌پور جویباری, born 6 August 1988) is an Iranian wrestler, Asian champion and multiple medalist at the world championships in the lightweight freestyle.

He represented Iran at the Wrestling Men's freestyle 60 kg event at the 2012 Summer Olympics.
