= Morteza Ghiasi =

Iranian freestyle wrestler

Personal information
- Native name: مرتضی قیاسی
- Full name: Morteza Ghiasi Cheka
- Nationality: Iranian
- Born: 7 April 1995 (age 31) Dorud, Lorestan province, Iran
- Height: 167 cm (5 ft 6 in)

Sport
- Sport: Wrestling
- Weight class: 65 kg
- Event: Freestyle

Achievements and titles
- Olympic finals: 8th (2020)
- Regional finals: (bronze) (2021)
Medal record
Men's freestyle wrestling
Representing Iran
World Cup
Silver medal – second place	2019 Yakutsk	65 kg
Asian Championships
Bronze medal – third place	2021 Almaty	65 kg
Islamic Solidarity Games
Bronze medal – third place	2021 Konya	65 kg
World Military Championships
Gold medal – first place	2021 Tehran	65 kg
Takhti Cup
Silver medal – second place	2018 Tabriz	65 kg

Morteza Ghiasi Cheka (Persian: مرتضی قیاسی چکا; born 7 April 1995) is an Iranian freestyle wrestler who currently competes at 65 kilograms. A 2021 Asian Continental Championships medalist, Ghiasi represented Iran at the 2020 Summer Olympics that were held in 2021.

== Major results ==
Year	Competition	Venue	Position	Event	Notes
Representing Iran
2021	Asian Continental Championships	Almaty, Kazakhstan	3rd	Freestyle 65 kg	
2021	2020 Summer Olympics	Tokyo, Japan	8th	Freestyle 65 kg	Defeated Haithem Dakhlaoui in opening match, Lost to Bajrang Punia
