= Hwang Ryong-hak =

North Korean wrestler

Personal information
- Full name: Hwang Ryong-hak
- Nationality: North Korea
- Born: North Korea
- Weight: 60 kg (132 lb)

Sport
- Sport: Wrestling
- Event: Freestyle
Medal record
Men's freestyle wrestling
Representing North Korea
Asian Championships
Gold medal – first place	2013 New Delhi	60 kg

- Hwang Ryong-hak
- Hangul: 황룡학
- RR: Hwang Ryonghak
- MR: Hwang Ryonghak

Hwang Ryong-hak is a North Korean wrestler who won the gold medal in the 66 kg division in the 2013 Asian Wrestling Championships by defeating Yang Jae-Hoon of South Korea in the final.
