= Ismail Musukaev =

Hungarian freestyle wrestler

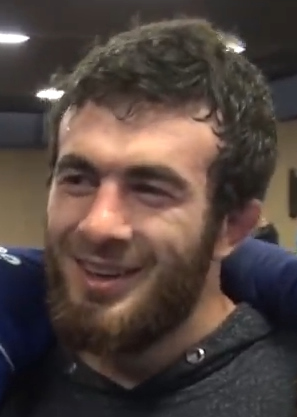

Personal information
- Full name: Ismail Timurovich Musukaev
- National team: Hungary
- Born: Исмаил Тимурович Мусукаев; 28 January 1993 (age 33) Khasanya, Nalchik, Kabardino-Balkaria, Russia
- Height: 1.63 m (5 ft 4 in)
- Weight: 65 kg (143 lb)

Sport
- Country: Russia (2012–2018); Hungary (2019–present)
- Sport: Amateur wrestling
- Weight class: 65 kg
- Event: Freestyle
- Club: Ferencvárosi TC
- Coached by: Yusup Azhoev; Sheme Shemeev

Achievements and titles
- Olympic finals: 5th(2020) 5th(2024)
- World finals: (gold) (2023) (bronze) (2019) (bronze) (2022)
- Regional finals: (gold) (2022)
Medal record
Men's freestyle wrestling
Representing Hungary
World Championships
Gold medal – first place	2023 Belgrade	65 kg
Bronze medal – third place	2019 Nur-Sultan	65 kg
Bronze medal – third place	2022 Belgrade	65 kg
European Championships
Gold medal – first place	2022 Budapest	65 kg
Bronze medal – third place	2024 Bucharest	70 kg
Bronze medal – third place	2026 Tirana	70 kg
Individual World Cup
Silver medal – second place	2020 Belgrade	65 kg
Representing Russia
European U23 Championships
Gold medal – first place	2015 Walbrzych	57 kg
World Junior Championships
Silver medal – second place	2013 Sofie	55 kg
Representing Kabardino-Balkaria
Russian National Championships
Silver medal – second place	2018 Odinzevo	61 kg
Silver medal – second place	2015 Kaspiisk	57 kg
Golden Grand Prix Ivan Yarygin
Silver medal – second place	2018 Krasnoyarsk	61 kg
Silver medal – second place	2015 Krasnoyarsk	57 kg
Ali Aliev Tournament
Gold medal – first place	2016 Makhachkala	61 kg
Gold medal – first place	2015 Kaspisk	57 kg
Gold medal – first place	2013 Makhachkala	55 kg
Silver medal – second place	2012 Makhachkala	55 kg
Bronze medal – third place	2018 Kaspisk	65 kg

Ismail Timurovich Musukaev (Russian: Исмаил Тимурович Мусукаев, Hungarian: Muszukajev Iszmail Timurovics; born 28 January 1993) is a Russian-born Hungarian freestyle wrestler. A world champion and European champion, Musukaev represented Hungary at the 2020 Summer Olympics in Tokyo, Japan and at the 2024 Summer Olympics in Paris, France in the men's 65 kg event.

== Career ==
He was the runner-up at the Russian nationals in 2015 at 57 kg.

At the Russian nationals 2016 at the end of the 57 kg quarterfinal wrestling match between Lebedev and Musukaev the referees awarded the victory to Viktor Lebedev. However, after the match the Russian Championships wrestling commission considered mistakes of the referee and awarded the victory to Ismail Musukaev (4–2). Even so, Lebedev remained in the semifinals.

After the incident, the Dagestani team walked out, along with others, including many Chechens.

At the Russian nationals 2018 he placed 2nd at 61 kilos, in the final match he lost to Magomedrasul Idrisov.

At the 2019 World Wrestling Championships held in Nur-Sultan, Kazakhstan, he won one of the bronze medals in the men's freestyle 65 kg event.

In 2020, he won the silver medal in the men's 65 kg event at the 2020 Individual Wrestling World Cup held in Belgrade, Serbia.

He won one of the bronze medals in the 65 kg event at the 2022 World Wrestling Championships held in Belgrade, Serbia.

He was the runner-up at the Ivan Yarygin Grand-prix in 2015 and in 2018.

September 19, 2023 Ismail Musukaev won a gold medal in the 65 kg weight category at the 2023 World Wrestling Championships in Belgrade. In the final, he defeated Sebastian Rivera of Puerto Rico in dominating fashion.

He won one of the bronze medals in the men's 70 kg event at the 2024 European Wrestling Championships held in Bucharest, Romania.

== Achievements ==
Year	Tournament	Location	Result	Event
2019	World Championships	Nur-Sultan, Kazakhstan	3rd	Freestyle 65 kg
2020	European Championships	Rome, Italy	5th	Freestyle 65 kg
2022	World Championships	Belgrade, Serbia	3rd	Freestyle 65 kg
2022	European Championships	Budapest, Hungary	1st	Freestyle 65 kg
2024	European Championships	Bucharest, Romania	3rd	Freestyle 70 kg
