= Vazgen Tevanyan =

Armenian freestyle wrestler

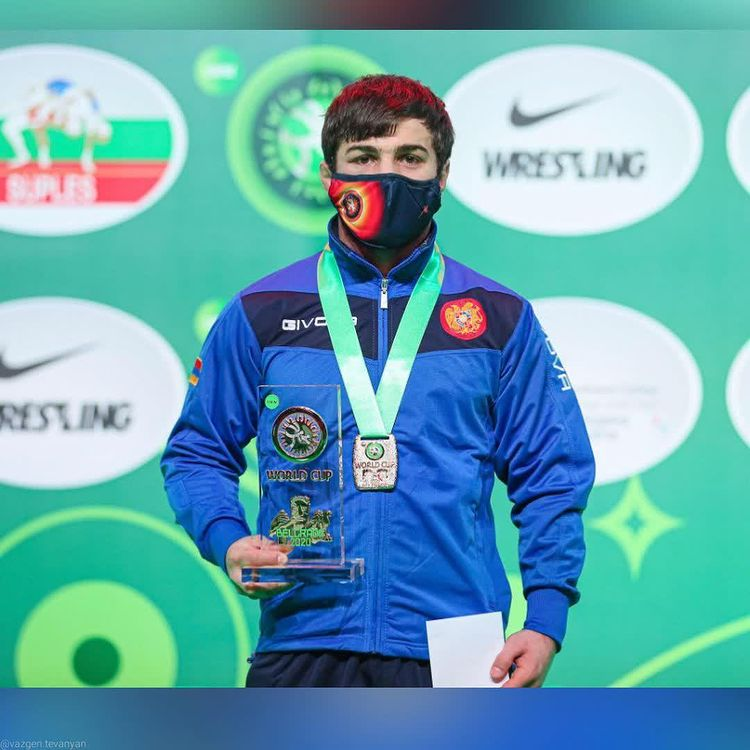
- 2020 Wrestling Individual World Cup

Personal information
- Native name: Վազգեն Թևանյան
- Nationality: Armenia
- Born: 27 October 1999 (age 27) Ararat Plain, Armenia
- Height: 163 cm (5 ft 4 in)

Sport
- Country: Armenia
- Sport: Amateur wrestling
- Weight class: 65 kg
- Event: Freestyle

Achievements and titles
- World finals: (bronze) (2023)
- Regional finals: (gold) (2023)
Medal record
Men's freestyle wrestling
Representing Armenia
World Championships
Silver medal – second place	2026 Astana	65 kg
Bronze medal – third place	2023 Belgrade	65 kg
European Championships
Gold medal – first place	2023 Zagreb	65 kg
Bronze medal – third place	2025 Bratislava	65 kg
Individual World Cup
Gold medal – first place	2020 Belgrade	65 kg
Grand Prix
Gold medal – first place	2023 Alexandria	65 kg
Gold medal – first place	2024 Zagreb	65 kg
Silver medal – second place	2024 Budapest	70 kg
World U23 Championships
Gold medal – first place	2022 Pontevedra	65 kg
Silver medal – second place	2021 Belgrade	70 kg
European U23 Championship
Gold medal – first place	2019 Novi Sad	65 kg
World Juniors Championships
Bronze medal – third place	2018 Trnava	61 kg
European Cadet Championships
Gold medal – first place	2015 Subotica	54 kg
Silver medal – second place	2016 Stockholm	58 kg

Vazgen Tevanyan (born 27 October 1999) is an Armenian freestyle wrestler who competes at 65 kilograms. An accomplished athlete, Tevanyan has most notably claimed the 2020 Individual World Cup and the 2019 U23 European Championships. He qualified for the 2020 Summer Olympics by winning the gold medal from the 2021 European Olympic Qualification Tournament.

He won the silver medal in the 70 kg event at the 2021 U23 World Wrestling Championships held in Belgrade, Serbia. He competed in the 65 kg event at the 2022 World Wrestling Championships held in Belgrade, Serbia.

He is a 2023 Ibrahim Moustafa Tournament winner in the 65 kg held in Alexandria, Egypt.
