= Alejandro Valdés =

Cuban freestyle wrestler

Personal information
- Full name: Alejandro Enrique Valdés Tobier
- Born: 18 November 1988 (age 37) Havana, Cuba
- Height: 165 cm (5 ft 5 in)
- Weight: 65 kg (143 lb)

Sport
- Sport: Wrestling
- Weight class: 51 kg
- Event: Freestyle
Medal record
Men's freestyle wrestling
Representing Cuba
World Championships
Bronze medal – third place	2017 Paris	65 kg
Bronze medal – third place	2018 Budapest	65 kg
Pan American Games
Gold medal – first place	2019 Lima	65 kg
Gold medal – first place	2023 Santiago	65 kg

Alejandro Enrique Valdés Tobier (Note: In this Spanish name, the first or paternal surname is Valdés and the second or maternal family name is Tobier.) (born 18 November 1988) is a Cuban freestyle wrestler. He competed in the men's freestyle 65 kg event at the 2016 Summer Olympics, in which he was eliminated in the repechage by Haislan Garcia of Canada.

He represented Cuba at the 2020 Summer Olympics, in which he was eliminated in the opening round by Daulet Niyazbekov of Kazakhstan.

He competed in the 65 kg event at the 2022 World Wrestling Championships held in Belgrade, Serbia.

In 2024, at the Pan American Wrestling Olympic Qualification Tournament held in Acapulco, Mexico, he earned a quota place for Cuba for the 2024 Summer Olympics held in Paris, France. He finished eleventh in the men's freestyle 65 kg event at the 2024 Olympics.
