= Krzysztof Bieńkowski =

Polish politician

Krzysztof Bieńkowski (born 30 January 1980 in Przasnysz) is a Polish politician, teacher and economist. In 2018–2023 he served as Starosta of Przasnysz County. In 2023, he was elected Senator for the 11th term Senate.

== Biography ==
=== Early life and professional activity ===
He graduated the Tadeusz Kościuszko Elementary School no. 3. In 1999, he graduated from liceum. In 2004, he graduated from the Koszalin University of Technology. He also completed postgraduate studies in computer science, education management and service management as well as doctoral studies in research methodology in economic sciences at the Academy of Finacnes in Warsaw. In 2005–2006 he was an academic teacher in the university. In 2004–2016 he worked as a teacher in a Prasnysz liceum. In 2009–2010 he directed auditions of Radio Prasnysz.

=== Political activity ===
He is a member of Law and Justice (PiS). In 2006, he was elected as a radny of Przasnysz County, starting from the electoral list of PiS, getting 462 votes. In the county council, he served as the chairman of the 3rd term council. In 2010, he was reelected a candidate of the Self-Governance Forum 2010, getting 379 votes. In the fourth term, he served as the deputy chair of the council. In 2013 he organized the action "Defend families". In 2014 he was again reelected on the list of PiS, getting 508 votes.

In 2018 he was again re-elected with 1694 votes. On 19 November 2018, he was elected as Starosta. In 2023, he was the candidate of PiS for the Senate in Senate constituency no. 39. He was elected with 80,567 votes, defeating Jan Maria Jackowski and Gabriel Janowski.

== Private life ==
He is the son of Jan and Regina. Since 2003, he is married to Bożena Bieńkowska, with who he has four sons.
