= Haji Aliyev =

Azerbaijani freestyle wrestler

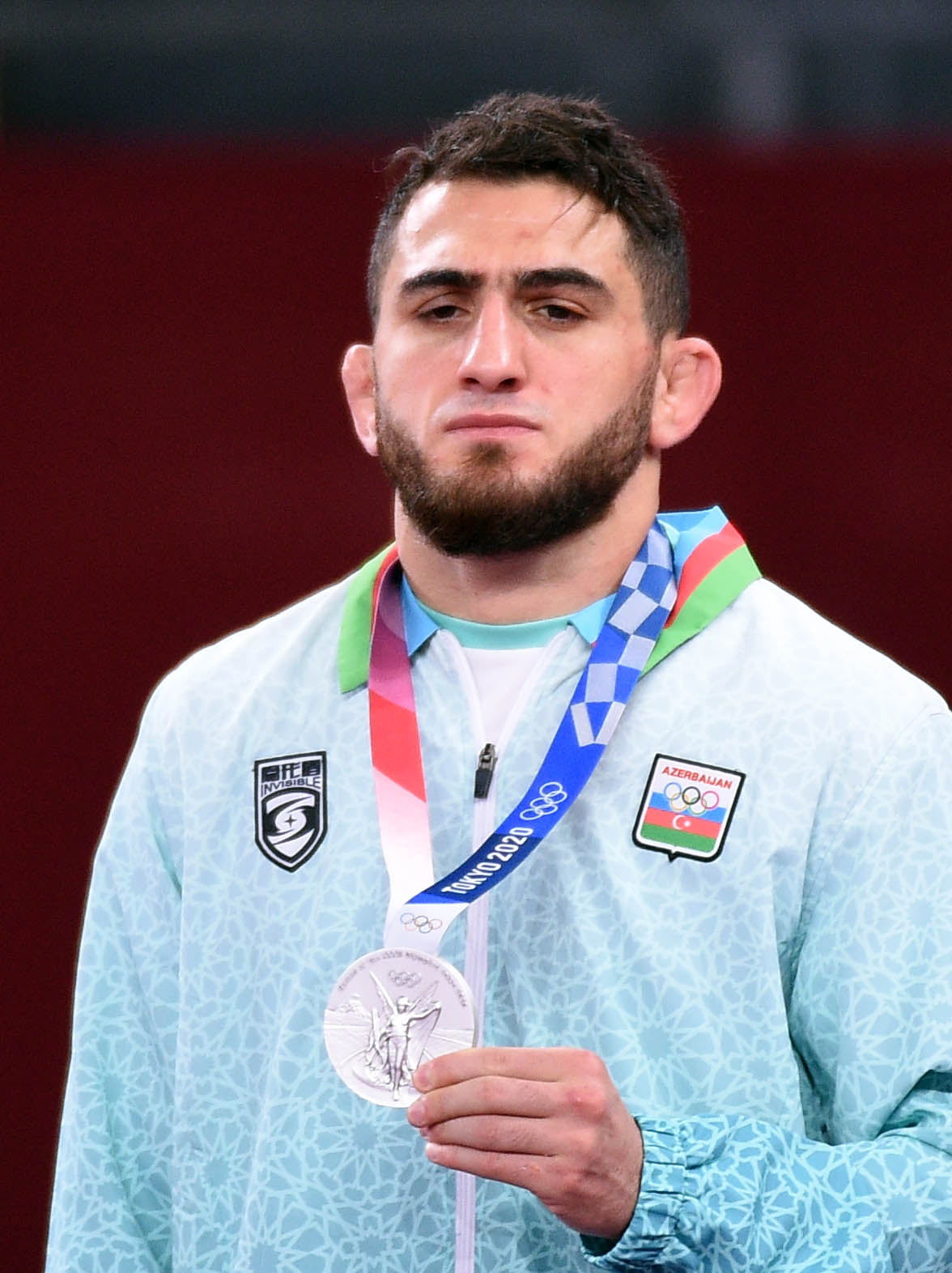
- Aliyev at the 2020 Summer Olympics

Personal information
- Native name: Hacı Əliyev
- Full name: Haji Azer oglu Aliyev
- Born: 21 April 1991 (age 35) Nakhchivan, Azerbaijan
- Height: 170 cm (5 ft 7 in)

Sport
- Country: Azerbaijan
- Sport: Wrestling
- Weight class: 65 kg
- Event: Freestyle
Medal record
Event	1st	2nd	3rd
Olympic Games	0	1	1
World Championships	3	0	0
European Championships	4	1	1
European Games	1	0	1
Islamic Solidarity Games	2	0	0
World Cup	0	2	2
Other	7	6	9
Total	17	10	14
Men's freestyle wrestling
Representing Azerbaijan
Olympic Games
Silver medal – second place	2020 Tokyo	65 kg
Bronze medal – third place	2016 Rio de Janeiro	57 kg
World Championships
Gold medal – first place	2014 Tashkent	61 kg
Gold medal – first place	2015 Las Vegas	61 kg
Gold medal – first place	2017 Paris	61 kg
European Championships
Gold medal – first place	2014 Vantaa	61 kg
Gold medal – first place	2018 Kaspiysk	65 kg
Gold medal – first place	2019 Bucharest	65 kg
Gold medal – first place	2023 Zagreb	70 kg
Silver medal – second place	2022 Budapest	65 kg
Bronze medal – third place	2016 Riga	61 kg
Individual World Cup
Bronze medal – third place	2020 Belgrade	65 kg
World Cup
Silver medal – second place	2012 Baku	60 kg
Silver medal – second place	2018 Iowa	65 kg
Bronze medal – third place	2015 Los Angeles	61 kg
Bronze medal – third place	2017 Kermanshah	65 kg
European Games
Gold medal – first place	2019 Minsk	65 kg
Bronze medal – third place	2015 Baku	61 kg
Islamic Solidarity Games
Gold medal – first place	2017 Baku	61 kg
Gold medal – first place	2021 Konya	65 kg
Summer Universiade
Bronze medal – third place	2013 Kazan	60 kg
World Military Championships
Gold medal – first place	2023 Baku	70 kg
Yasar Dogu Tournament
Bronze medal – third place	2013 Ankara	60 kg
Dan Kolov & Nikola Petrov Tournament
Gold medal – first place	2014 Sofia	61 kg
Golden Grand Prix
Gold medal – first place	2012 Baku	60 kg
Gold medal – first place	2014 Baku	61 kg
Gold medal – first place	2015 Baku	61 kg
Silver medal – second place	2013 Baku	60 kg
Grand Prix
Gold medal – first place	2014 Dortmund	65 kg
Gold medal – first place	2016 Dortmund	61 kg
Silver medal – second place	2011 Grozny	60 kg
Silver medal – second place	2018 Minsk	65 kg
Silver medal – second place	2023 Zagreb	70 kg
Bronze medal – third place	2012 Dortmund	60 kg
Bronze medal – third place	2012 Kyiv	60 kg
Bronze medal – third place	2015 Paris	65 kg
Bronze medal – third place	2021 Warsaw	70 kg
Bronze medal – third place	2022 Rome	70 kg
Bronze medal – third place	2023 Warsaw	65 kg
Bronze medal – third place	2024 Budapest	65 kg
European Juniors Championships
Silver medal – second place	2011 Zrenjanin	60 kg
European Cadets Championships
Silver medal – second place	2008 Daugavpils	54 kg

Haji Aliyev (Azerbaijani: Hacı Azər oğlu Əliyev; born 21 April 1991), is an Azerbaijani freestyle wrestler. He competed in the 61 kg division at the 2014 European Wrestling Championships and won the gold medal after defeating Bekkhan Goygereyev of Russia.

Aliyev won his first world championship gold medal in the freestyle 61 kg class in the 2014 World Wrestling Championships in Tashkent.

Moreover, Aliyev got his second and third gold medals in Las Vegas 2015 and Paris 2017.

In June 2015, he competed in the inaugural European Games, for the host country Azerbaijan in wrestling, more specifically, Men's freestyle in the 61 kilogram range. He earned a bronze medal.

He competed in the 57 kg division at the 2016 Summer Olympics and won the bronze medal after beating Vladimir Dubov of Bulgaria. He was the flag bearer for Azerbaijan during the closing ceremonies. His personal coach is Elman Azimzadeh.

After this success, Haji Aliyev won the European Championship among juniors held in Dawgwils, Latvia. 17-year-old Haji Aliyev, who competed in 54 kg, confidently defeated all his rivals at the finals and defeated Georgian Vladimir Khincheashvili at the decisive game and was awarded the silver medal of the European Championship. On July 25, President of the Azerbaijan Wrestling Federation Fazil Mammadov received the wrestlers who won the European Championship among juniors, including Haji Aliyev. Haci Aliyev participated in his last race in Istanbul, Turkey in 2008. Haci Aliyev, who competed in the "Presidential Tournament", was not in the list of medalists.

In 2009, Haji Aliyev won the first place in the Azerbaijani Youth Championship in February. Haci Aliyev, who tried hard in 60 kilograms, defeated Aghahuseyn Muradov in the finals and won the silver medal of the race. In March, Haji Aliyev joined the international tournament in Riga, Latvia and finished in the 5th place.

Haji Aliyev has made his next achievements in 2009 in domestic competitions. He won the tournament in October among young people dedicated to the memory of the Azerbaijani National Hero Aliyar Aliyev and became the champion of the race. In December, Haji Aliyev has won the first place among adults. He defeated all his opponents in the Cup of Azerbaijan and became the winner of the tournament.

In 2020, he won one of the bronze medals in the men's 65 kg event at the 2020 Individual Wrestling World Cup held in Belgrade, Serbia.

In August 2021 in 2020 Summer Olympics, he defeated Daulet Niyazbekov to enter Semi Finals round.

He lost his bronze medal match in the 65 kg event at the 2022 World Wrestling Championships held in Belgrade, Serbia.

He competed at the 2024 European Wrestling Olympic Qualification Tournament in Baku, Azerbaijan and he earned a quota place for Azerbaijan for the 2024 Summer Olympics in Paris, France.
