= Vladimir Dubov =

Bulgarian freestyle wrestler

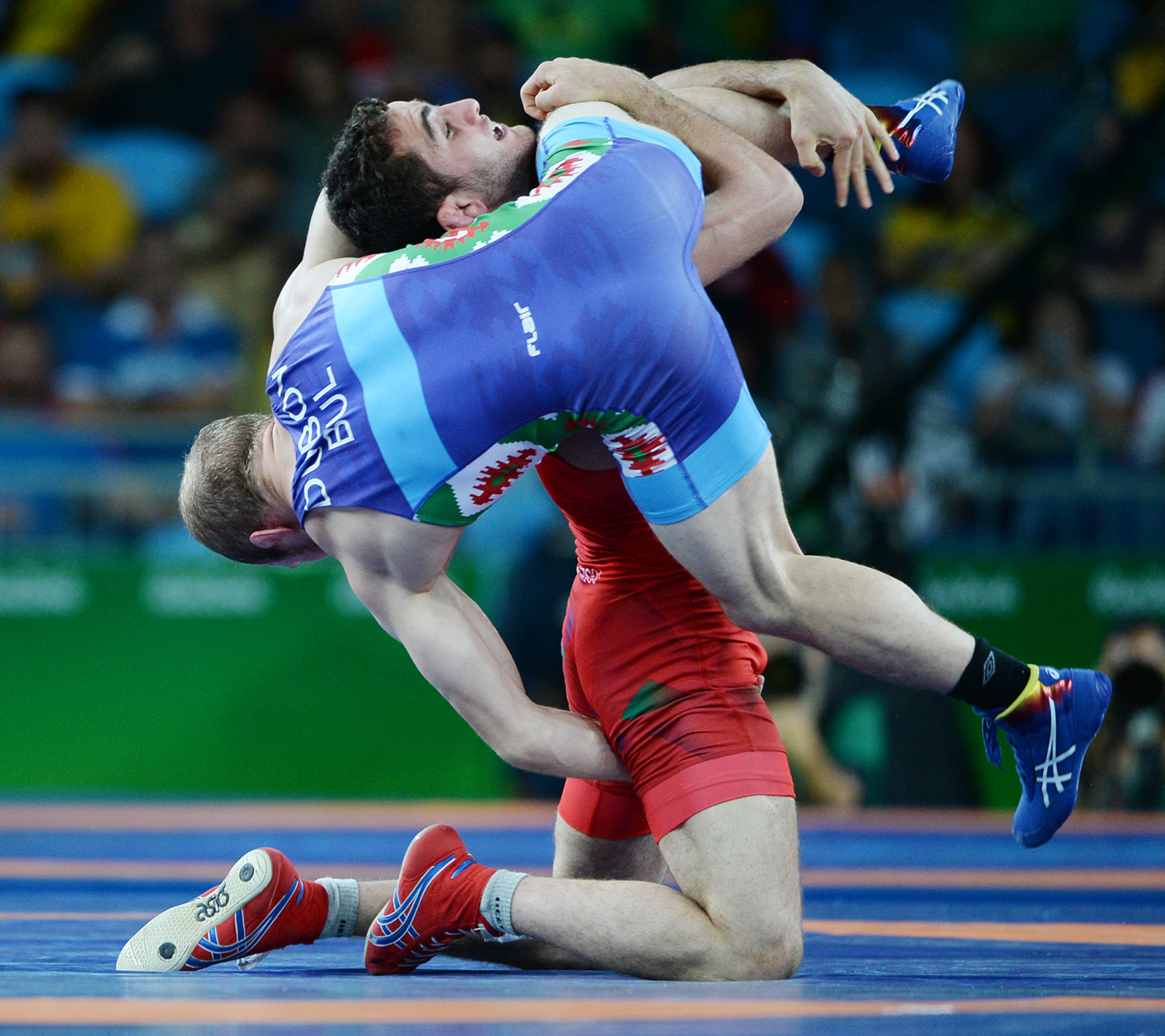
- Dubov (blue) against Haji Aliyev during the 2016 Summer Olympics

Personal information
- Nationality: Bulgaria
- Born: Владимир Дубов; February 20, 1988 (age 38) Dmytrivka, Bilhorod-Dnistrovskyi Raion, Ukrainian SSR
- Height: 1.55 m (5 ft 1 in)

Sport
- Country: Bulgaria
- Sport: Wrestling
- Weight class: 61 kg
- Event: Freestyle

Achievements and titles
- Olympic finals: 5th(2016)
- World finals: (silver) (2013) (bronze) (2015) 5th(2017)
- Regional finals: (silver) (2013)
Medal record
Men's freestyle wrestling
Representing Bulgaria
World Championships
Silver medal – second place	2013 Budapest	60 kg
Bronze medal – third place	2015 Las Vegas	61 kg
European Championships
Silver medal – second place	2013 Tbilisi	60 kg
Representing Ukraine
European Juniors Championships
Bronze medal – third place	2006 Szombathely	55 kg

Vladimir Vladimirov Dubov (Bulgarian: Владимир Владимиров Дубов; born 20 February 1988) is a Bulgarian and Ukrainian freestyle wrestler. He competes in the 60 kg division and won the silver medal in the same division at the 2013 European Wrestling Championships. He repeated his success at the 2013 World Wrestling Championships.

In March 2021, he competed at the European Qualification Tournament in Budapest, Hungary hoping to qualify for the 2020 Summer Olympics in Tokyo, Japan.

He competed in the 65 kg event at the 2022 World Wrestling Championships held in Belgrade, Serbia.
