= Daulet Niyazbekov =

Kazakh freestyle wrestler

Daulet Niyazbekov Дәулет Ниязбеков
Personal information
- Native name: Дәулет Шораұлы Ниязбеков
- Full name: Daulet Shoraevich Niyazbekov
- Nationality: Kazakhstan
- Born: February 12, 1989 (age 37) Zhanakorgan, Kyzylorda Region, Kazakh SSR, Soviet Union
- Height: 164 cm (5 ft 5 in)

Sport
- Country: Kazakhstan
- Sport: Wrestling
- Weight class: 65 kg
- Event: Freestyle
- Club: CSKA
- Coached by: Abutalip Amanov

Achievements and titles
- Olympic finals: 5th (2012) 5th (2020)
- World finals: (bronze) (2011) (silver) (2019)
- Regional finals: (gold) (2015) (gold) (2016) (gold) (2018) (bronze) (2013) (bronze) (2014) (bronze) (2017) (bronze) (2020)
Medal record
Men's Freestyle wrestling
Representing Kazakhstan
World Championships
Silver medal – second place	2019 Nur-Sultan	65 kg
Bronze medal – third place	2011 Istanbul	55 kg
Asian Championships
Gold medal – first place	2015 Doha	61 kg
Gold medal – first place	2016 Bangkok	61 kg
Gold medal – first place	2018 Bishkek	65 kg
Bronze medal – third place	2013 New Delhi	60 kg
Bronze medal – third place	2014 Astana	61 kg
Bronze medal – third place	2017 New Delhi	61 kg
Bronze medal – third place	2020 New Delhi	65 kg

Daulet Niyazbekov (Kazakh: Дәулет Шораұлы Ниязбеков; born 12 February 1989) is a former Kazakh freestyle wrestler, who was a member of the Olympic Games 2012. He competed in the men's freestyle 55 kg and he lost his bronze medal match to World Champion Yang Kyong-il. Niyazbekov was a bronze medalist at the World Wrestling Championships 2011 in Istanbul, Turkey. He won the Asian Wrestling Championship in 2015, as well as bronze at the 2014 and 2017 editions.

Niyazbekov competed in the men's freestyle 61 kg at the World Wrestling Championships 2015 in Las Vegas, United States. He was eliminated in the quarterfinal rounds, after being defeated by American Reece Humphrey.

He represented Kazakhstan at the 2020 Summer Olympics in the men's freestyle 65 kg class.
