= 2025 World Wrestling Championships – Men's freestyle 65 kg =

Wrestling competitions

Men's freestyle 65 kg at the 2025 World Championships
- Venue: Arena Zagreb
- Dates: 15–16 September 2025
- Competitors: 34 from 32 nations

Medalists
gold medal	Rahman Amouzad	Iran
silver medal	Kotaro Kiyooka	Japan
bronze medal	Real Woods	United States
bronze medal	Umidjon Jalolov	Uzbekistan

The men's freestyle 65 kilograms is a competition featured at the 2025 World Wrestling Championships, and was held in Zagreb, Croatia on 15 and 16 September 2025.

This freestyle wrestling competition consists of a single-elimination tournament, with a repechage used to determine the winner of two bronze medals. The two finalists face off for gold and silver medals. Each wrestler who loses to one of the two finalists moves into the repechage, culminating in a pair of bronze medal matches, featuring the semifinal losers each facing the remaining repechage opponent from their half of the bracket.

== Results ==
Legend

- F — Won by fall

=== Finals ===
Semifinals		Final
Rahman Amouzad (IRI)	5
Peiman Biabani (CAN)	0	Rahman Amouzad (IRI)	10
Umidjon Jalolov (UZB)	0	Kotaro Kiyooka (JPN)	0
Kotaro Kiyooka (JPN)	5

=== Top half ===
==== Section 1 ====
Round of 64
Kim Kwang-jin (PRK)	2
Yun Jun-sik (KOR)	0

Round of 32
Rahman Amouzad (IRI)	13
Ikromzhon Khadzhimurodov (KGZ)	0
Real Woods (USA)	14
Maxim Saculțan (MDA)	2
Kim Kwang-jin (PRK)	11
Marian Sandu (ROU)	3
Cavit Acar (TUR)	5
Sujeet Kalkal (IND)	15

Round of 16
Rahman Amouzad (IRI)	12
Real Woods (USA)	1
Kim Kwang-jin (PRK)	2
Sujeet Kalkal (IND)	9

Quarterfinals
Rahman Amouzad (IRI)	6
Sujeet Kalkal (IND)	5

==== Section 2 ====
Round of 64

Round of 32
Khamzat Arsamerzouev (FRA)	12
Nico Megerle (GER)	1
Peiman Biabani (CAN)	5
Krzysztof Bieńkowski (POL)	0
Andrii Biliichuk (UKR)	9
Mikyay Naim (BUL)	8
Islam Guseinov (UWW)	5
Ali Rahimzade (AZE)	4

Round of 16
Khamzat Arsamerzouev (FRA)	1
Peiman Biabani (CAN)	2
Andrii Biliichuk (UKR)	14
Islam Guseinov (UWW)	11

Quarterfinals
Peiman Biabani (CAN)	5
Andrii Biliichuk (UKR)	2

=== Bottom half ===
==== Section 3 ====
Round of 64

Round of 32
Vazgen Tevanyan (ARM)	8
Abdulmazhid Kudiev (TJK)	14
Umidjon Jalolov (UZB)	11
Nino Leutert (SUI)	0
Goderdzi Dzebisashvili (GEO)	9
Abdullah Assaf (PLE)	1
Chouaib Sahraoui (ALG)	1
Sebastian Rivera (PUR)	12^{F}

Round of 16
Abdulmazhid Kudiev (TJK)	4
Umidjon Jalolov (UZB)	8
Goderdzi Dzebisashvili (GEO)	0
Sebastian Rivera (PUR)	10

Quarterfinals
Umidjon Jalolov (UZB)	5
Sebastian Rivera (PUR)	3

==== Section 4 ====
Round of 64
Wei Tao (CHN)	0
Nachyn Kuular (KAZ)	10

Round of 32
Ibragim Ibragimov (UWW)	12
Batbaataryn Gantulga (MGL)	0
Wilfredo Rodríguez (VEN)	0
Nachyn Kuular (KAZ)	10
Colin Realbuto (ITA)	0
Ayub Musaev (BEL)	7
Alibeg Alibegov (BRN)	2
Kotaro Kiyooka (JPN)	13

Round of 16
Ibragim Ibragimov (UWW)	6
Nachyn Kuular (KAZ)	0
Ayub Musaev (BEL)	4
Kotaro Kiyooka (JPN)	9

Quarterfinals
Ibragim Ibragimov (UWW)	0
Kotaro Kiyooka (JPN)	3

=== Repechage ===
Repechage round 2
Ikromzhon Khadzhimurodov (KGZ)	0
Real Woods (USA)	10
Alibeg Alibegov (BRN)	3
Ayub Musaev (BEL)	3

Repechage round 3
Real Woods (USA)	7
Sujeet Kalkal (IND)	5
Alibeg Alibegov (BRN)	0
Ibragim Ibragimov (UWW)	3

Bronze medals
Real Woods (USA)	3
Peiman Biabani (CAN)	1
Ibragim Ibragimov (UWW)	3
Umidjon Jalolov (UZB)	7

== Final standing ==
Rank	Athlete
1st place, gold medalist(s)	Rahman Amouzad (IRI)
2nd place, silver medalist(s)	Kotaro Kiyooka (JPN)
3rd place, bronze medalist(s)	Real Woods (USA)
3rd place, bronze medalist(s)	Umidjon Jalolov (UZB)
5	Peiman Biabani (CAN)
5	Ibragim Ibragimov (UWW)
7	Sebastian Rivera (PUR)
8	Sujeet Kalkal (IND)
9	Nachyn Kuular (KAZ)
10	Andrii Biliichuk (UKR)
11	Kim Kwang-jin (PRK)
12	Khamzat Arsamerzouev (FRA)
13	Ayub Musaev (BEL)
14	Abdulmazhid Kudiev (TJK)
15	Islam Guseinov (UWW)
16	Alibeg Alibegov (BRN)
17	Goderdzi Dzebisashvili (GEO)
18	Mikyay Naim (BUL)
19	Vazgen Tevanyan (ARM)
20	Cavit Acar (TUR)
21	Ali Rahimzade (AZE)
22	Marian Sandu (ROU)
23	Maxim Saculțan (MDA)
24	Abdullah Assaf (PLE)
25	Nico Megerle (GER)
26	Chouaib Sahraoui (ALG)
27	Yun Jun-sik (KOR)
28	Krzysztof Bieńkowski (POL)
29	Colin Realbuto (ITA)
30	Wilfredo Rodríguez (VEN)
31	Wei Tao (CHN)
32	Nino Leutert (SUI)
33	Batbaataryn Gantulga (MGL)
34	Ikromzhon Khadzhimurodov (KGZ)
