= Kotaro Kiyooka =

Japanese freestyle wrestler

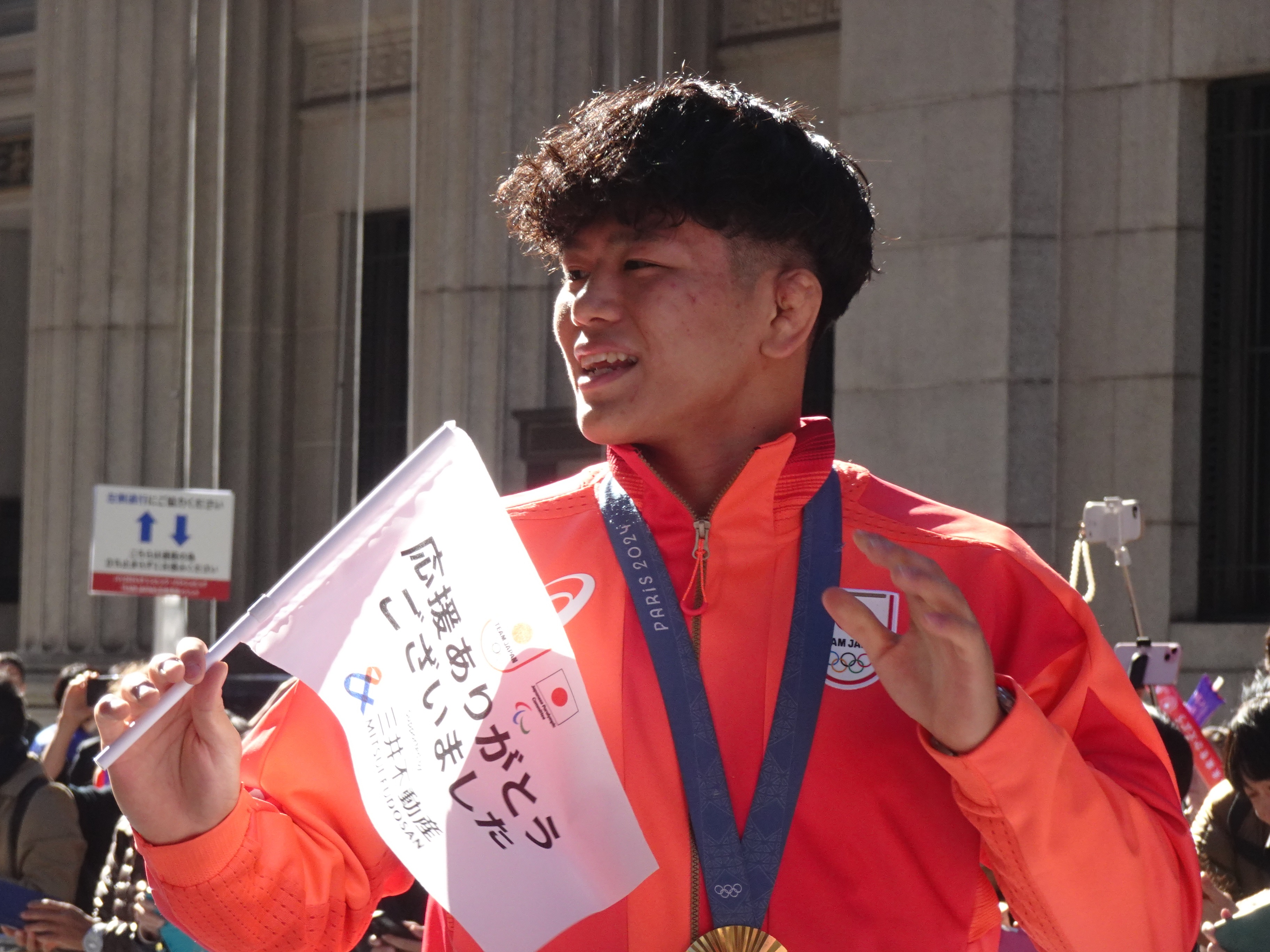
- Kiyooka at Paris 2024 Summer Olympians and Paralympians Japan National Team parade event on November 30, 2024

Personal information
- Native name: 清岡幸大郎
- Nationality: Japan
- Born: 12 April 2001 (age 25) Kōchi Prefecture, Japan
- Height: 170 cm (5 ft 7 in)

Sport
- Country: Japan
- Sport: Wrestling
- Weight class: 65 kg
- Event: Freestyle
- Club: Nippon Sport Science University
- Coached by: Kenichi Yumoto

Achievements and titles
- Olympic finals: (gold) (2024)
- World finals: (silver) (2025)
- Regional finals: (bronze) (2026)
Medal record
Men's freestyle wrestling
Representing Japan
Olympic Games
| Gold medal – first place | 2024 Paris | 65 kg |
World Championships
| Silver medal – second place | 2025 Zagreb | 65 kg |
Asian Games
| Bronze medal – third place | 2026 Aichi–Nagoya | 65 kg |
Grand Prix
| Gold medal – first place | 2023 Sofia | 65 kg |
| Gold medal – first place | 2024 Budapest | 65 kg |
Japan National Championships
| Gold medal – first place | 2023 Tokyo | 65 kg |
| Silver medal – second place | 2021 Tokyo | 61 kg |
| Bronze medal – third place | 2019 Tokyo | 57 kg |
| Bronze medal – third place | 2022 Tokyo | 65 kg |

Kotaro Kiyooka (清岡幸大郎, Kiyooka Kotaro; born 12 April 2001) is a Japanese freestyle wrestler who competes in the 65 kilogram class. He represented Japan at the 2024 Summer Olympics, where he became the reigning Olympic champion. He qualified by reaching the finals at the 2024 Asian Olympic Qualification Tournament and by winning the Olympic national trials, where he defeated World and Olympic champion Takuto Otoguro.

== Early life ==
Kiyooka was born in Kōchi Prefecture, where he started wrestling at an early age. He attended Kochi Minami High School. During his teenage years, he won medals at multiple Japan National tournaments in different age-groups.

== Career ==
=== 2018–2020 ===
While still a high school student, Kiyooka placed fifth at the Emperor's Cup in 2018, and third in 2019 in the 57 kilogram class. After graduating, he started attending the Nippon Sport Science University in 2020 and reached fifth place at the Emperor's Cup that year in the 61 kilogram class.

=== 2021–2022 ===
In 2021, Kiyooka reached second place at the Meiji Cup and fifth at the Emperor's Cup. In 2022, he moved up to the 65 kilogram class, reaching third place at the Meiji Cup and the Emperor's Cup.

=== 2023 ===
Competing outside Japan for the first time in his career, Kiyooka won the championship at the Dan Kolov & Nikola Petrov Tournament, defeating returning champion Islam Dudaev, Olympian Agustín Destribats and U23 World finalist Mikyay Naim.

He then qualified for the U23 World Championships by winning the trials, before a seventh-place finish at the Meiji Cup. At the U23 World Championships, Kiyooka reached ninth place.

At the Emperor's Cup, Kiyooka stunned World and returning Olympic champion Takuto Otoguro to reach the finals before claiming the championship, qualifying for the 2024 Asian Olympic Qualification Tournament.

=== 2024 ===
At the qualifier, he defeated U23 European finalist Abdulmazhid Kudiev, Olympian Yun Jun-sik and Yuan Shaohua to reach the Olympic quota. He thus represented Japan at the 2024 Summer Olympics.

In June, Kiyooka entered the Polyák Imre & Varga János Memorial Tournament, where after a first-round loss to three-time World champion Haji Aliyev, he rebounded with victories over reigning World champion Ismail Musukaev, NCAA finalist and fellow Olympian Austin Gomez, and Abbas Ebrahimzade, winning gold.

In August, Kiyooka made his Olympic debut at the 2024 Summer Olympics in Paris. On the first day, he opened up with a technical fall over Maxim Saculțan from Moldova, followed by hard-fought victories over returning World finalist Sebastian Rivera from Puerto Rico and Asian Games champion Tömör-Ochiryn Tulga from Mongolia, cruising to the finals and securing a medal. In the gold-medal bout, he defeated world champion Rahman Amouzad from Iran, becoming an Olympic champion at age 23.

Throughout October and November, Kiyooka competed in the Bundesliga in Germany for club KSC Hösbach. He recorded a 4–1 record for them, shifting between the 66, 71, and 75-kilogram weight classes.

== Freestyle record ==
Senior Freestyle Matches
| Res. | Record | Opponent | Score | Date | Event | Location |
|---|---|---|---|---|---|---|
| Win | 42–15 | (Uzbekistan) Andriy Shyyka | 6–0 | November 23, 2024 | 2024 KSV Köllerbach – KSC Hösbach (75 kg) | Germany |
| Win | 41–15 | (Yemen) Ibrahim Guzan | TF 15–0 | November 16, 2024 | 2024 KSC Hösbach – ASV Mainz 88 (66 kg) | Germany |
| Win | 40–15 | (Moldova) Vasile Diacon | 9–2 | November 9, 2024 | 2024 KSC Hösbach – SC Kleinostheim (75 kg) | Germany |
| Win | 39–15 | (Germany) Saba Bolaghi | Fall | November 2, 2024 | 2024 KSC Hösbach – SC Kleinostheim (66 kg) | Germany |
| Win | 38–15 | (Germany) Alexander Semisorow | TF 18–2 | October 19, 2024 | 2024 ASV Mainz 88 – KSC Hösbach (71 kg) | Germany |
| Loss | 37–15 | (Kazakhstan) Nachyn Kuular | 8–8 | October 12, 2024 | 2024 SC Kleinostheim – KSC Hösbach (71 kg) | Germany |
2024 Summer Olympics (gold) at 65 kg
| Win | 37–14 | (Iran) Rahman Amouzad | 10–3 | August 11, 2024 | 2024 Summer Olympics | Paris, France |
| Win | 36–14 | (Mongolia) Tömör-Ochiryn Tulga | 5–1 | August 10, 2024 | 2024 Summer Olympics | Paris, France |
| Win | 35–14 | (Puerto Rico) Sebastian Rivera | 8–6 | August 10, 2024 | 2024 Summer Olympics | Paris, France |
| Win | 34–14 | (Moldova) Maxim Saculțan | TF 10–0 | August 10, 2024 | 2024 Summer Olympics | Paris, France |
2024 Polyák Imre & Varga János Memorial (gold) at 65 kg
| Win | 33–14 | (Iran) Abbas Ebrahimzadeh | 12–8 | June 6, 2024 | 2024 Polyák Imre & Varga János Memorial | Budapest, Hungary |
| Win | 32–14 | (Mexico) Austin Gomez | 12–6 | June 6, 2024 | 2024 Polyák Imre & Varga János Memorial | Budapest, Hungary |
| Win | 31–14 | (Hungary) Ismail Musukaev | 7–2 | June 6, 2024 | 2024 Polyák Imre & Varga János Memorial | Budapest, Hungary |
| Loss | 30–14 | (Azerbaijan) Haji Aliyev | 2–5 | June 6, 2024 | 2024 Polyák Imre & Varga János Memorial | Budapest, Hungary |
2024 Asian Olympic Qualification Tournament (gold) at 65 kg
| Win | 30–13 | (China) Yuan Shaohua | TF 11–0 | April 19, 2024 | 2024 Asian Olympic Qualification Tournament | Bishkek, Kyrgyzstan |
| Win | 29–13 | (South Korea) Yun Jun-sik | TF 10–0 | April 19, 2024 | 2024 Asian Olympic Qualification Tournament | Bishkek, Kyrgyzstan |
| Win | 28–13 | (Tajikistan) Abdulmazhid Kudiev | 10–7 | April 19, 2024 | 2024 Asian Olympic Qualification Tournament | Bishkek, Kyrgyzstan |
2023 Japan Nationals (gold) at 65 kg
| Win | 27–13 | (Japan) Masanosuke Ono | TF 11–0 | December 21–24, 2023 | 2023 Japan National Championships – Emperor's Cup | Tokyo, Japan |
| Win | 26–13 | (Japan) Takuto Otoguro | 6–6 | December 21–24, 2023 | 2023 Japan National Championships – Emperor's Cup | Tokyo, Japan |
| Win | 25–13 | (Japan) Kaiki Yamaguchi | 2–1 | December 21–24, 2023 | 2023 Japan National Championships – Emperor's Cup | Tokyo, Japan |
| Win | 24–13 | (Japan) Yuto Miwa | 11–3 | December 21–24, 2023 | 2023 Japan National Championships – Emperor's Cup | Tokyo, Japan |
| Win | 23–13 | (Japan) Toshihiro Hasegawa | TF 11–0 | December 21–24, 2023 | 2023 Japan National Championships – Emperor's Cup | Tokyo, Japan |
2023 U23 World Championships 9th at 65 kg
| Loss | 22–13 | (Egypt) Omar Mourad | Fall | October 24, 2023 | 2023 U23 World Championships | Tirana, Albania |
| Win | 22–12 | (Armenia) Andranik Avetisyan | Fall | October 24, 2023 | 2023 U23 World Championships | Tirana, Albania |
2023 Japan Nationals 7th at 65 kg
| Loss | 21–12 | (Japan) Kaiki Yamaguchi | 1–2 | June 15–18, 2023 | 2023 Japan National Championships – Meiji Cup | Tokyo, Japan |
2023 JPN U23 World Team Trials (gold) at 65 kg
| Win | 21–11 | (Japan) Suwama Shotaro | 3–0 | April 22, 2023 | 2023 U23 World Championships Japan National Team Qualifier | (Japan) Fujimi, Saitama |
| Win | 20–11 | (Japan) Kanta Tokuriki | 7–0 | April 22, 2023 | 2023 U23 World Championships Japan National Team Qualifier | (Japan) Fujimi, Saitama |
2023 Dan Kolov & Nikola Petrov (gold) at 65 kg
| Win | 19–11 | (Albania) Islam Dudaev | 7–6 | March 3, 2023 | 2023 Dan Kolov & Nikola Petrov Tournament | Sofia, Bulgaria |
| Win | 18–11 | (France) Marwane Yezza | 6–2 | March 3, 2023 | 2023 Dan Kolov & Nikola Petrov Tournament | Sofia, Bulgaria |
| Win | 17–11 | (Argentina) Agustín Destribats | 7–6 | March 3, 2023 | 2023 Dan Kolov & Nikola Petrov Tournament | Sofia, Bulgaria |
| Win | 16–11 | (Iran) Amir-Ali Asad | TF 11–0 | March 3, 2023 | 2023 Dan Kolov & Nikola Petrov Tournament | Sofia, Bulgaria |
| Win | 15–11 | (Bulgaria) Mikyay Naim | TF 14–3 | March 3, 2023 | 2023 Dan Kolov & Nikola Petrov Tournament | Sofia, Bulgaria |
2022 Japan Nationals (bronze) at 65 kg
| Win | 14–11 | (Japan) Yujiro Ueno | 14–6 | December 22–25, 2022 | 2022 Japan National Championships – Emperor's Cup | Tokyo, Japan |
| Loss | 13–11 | (Japan) Ryoma Anraku | 2–3 | December 22–25, 2022 | 2022 Japan National Championships – Emperor's Cup | Tokyo, Japan |
| Win | 13–10 | (Japan) Yuuma Tomiyama | 9–2 | December 22–25, 2022 | 2022 Japan National Championships – Emperor's Cup | Tokyo, Japan |
2022 Japan Nationals (bronze) at 65 kg
| Win | 12–10 | (Japan) Suwama Shotaro | TF 17–6 | June 16–19, 2022 | 2022 Japan National Championships – Meiji Cup | Tokyo, Japan |
| Win | 11–10 | (Japan) Yoshinosuke Aoyagi | 4–2 | June 16–19, 2022 | 2022 Japan National Championships – Meiji Cup | Tokyo, Japan |
| Loss | 10–10 | (Japan) Kaiki Yamaguchi | 1–8 | June 16–19, 2022 | 2022 Japan National Championships – Meiji Cup | Tokyo, Japan |
| Win | 10–9 | (Japan) Taiki Tsutsumi | 3–0 | June 16–19, 2022 | 2022 Japan National Championships – Meiji Cup | Tokyo, Japan |
2021 Japan Nationals 5th at 61 kg
| Loss | 9–9 | (Japan) Kodai Ogawa | 4–4 | December 16–19, 2021 | 2021 Japan National Championships – Emperor's Cup | Tokyo, Japan |
| Loss | 9–8 | (Japan) Rei Higuchi | 1–2 | December 16–19, 2021 | 2021 Japan National Championships – Emperor's Cup | Tokyo, Japan |
| Win | 9–7 | (Japan) Fukami Kotetsu | TF 10–0 | December 16–19, 2021 | 2021 Japan National Championships – Emperor's Cup | Tokyo, Japan |
2021 Japan Nationals (silver) at 61 kg
| Loss | 8–7 | (Japan) Toshihiro Hasegawa | 1–6 | May 27–30, 2021 | 2021 Japan National Championships – Meiji Cup | Tokyo, Japan |
| Win | 8–6 | (Japan) Kodai Ogawa | 7–4 | May 27–30, 2021 | 2021 Japan National Championships – Meiji Cup | Tokyo, Japan |
| Win | 7–6 | (Japan) Wataru Tadano | TF 11–0 | May 27–30, 2021 | 2021 Japan National Championships – Meiji Cup | Tokyo, Japan |
2020 Japan Nationals 5th at 61 kg
| Loss | 6–6 | (Japan) Toshihiro Hasegawa | TF 1–12 | December 17–20, 2018 | 2020 Japan National Championships – Emperor's Cup | Tokyo, Japan |
| Loss | 6–5 | (Japan) Kodai Ogawa | 1–7 | December 17–20, 2018 | 2020 Japan National Championships – Emperor's Cup | Tokyo, Japan |
2019 Japan Nationals (bronze) at 57 kg
| Win | 6–4 | (Japan) Taiki Arinobu | 8–4 | December 19–22, 2019 | 2019 Japan National Championships – Emperor's Cup | Tokyo, Japan |
| Loss | 5–4 | (Japan) Yuki Takahashi | TF 1–11 | December 19–22, 2019 | 2019 Japan National Championships – Emperor's Cup | Tokyo, Japan |
| Win | 5–3 | (Japan) Iwasawa Kan | TF 12–1 | December 19–22, 2019 | 2019 Japan National Championships – Emperor's Cup | Tokyo, Japan |
| Win | 4–3 | (Japan) Daiki Araki | 12–3 | December 19–22, 2019 | 2019 Japan National Championships – Emperor's Cup | Tokyo, Japan |
| Win | 3–3 | (Japan) Suwama Shotaro | 4–1 | December 19–22, 2019 | 2019 Japan National Championships – Emperor's Cup | Tokyo, Japan |
2019 Japan Nationals 8th at 57 kg
| Loss | 2–3 | (Japan) Daiki Araki | 3–4 | June 13–16, 2019 | 2019 Japan National Championships – Meiji Cup | Tokyo, Japan |
2018 Japan Nationals 5th at 57 kg
| Loss | 2–2 | (Japan) Daiki Araki | 1–3 | December 20–23, 2018 | 2018 Japan National Championships – Emperor's Cup | Tokyo, Japan |
| Loss | 2–1 | (Japan) Yuki Takahashi | 0–7 | December 20–23, 2018 | 2018 Japan National Championships – Emperor's Cup | Tokyo, Japan |
| Win | 2–0 | (Japan) Rikuto Arai | 2–2 | December 20–23, 2018 | 2018 Japan National Championships – Emperor's Cup | Tokyo, Japan |
| Win | 1–0 | (Japan) Taiki Arinobu | TF 12–2 | December 20–23, 2018 | 2018 Japan National Championships – Emperor's Cup | Tokyo, Japan |
