= Wrestling at the 2026 Asian Games – Men's freestyle 65 kg =

Men's freestyle 65 kg at the 2026 Asian Games
- Venue: Inae Sports Center
- Date: 2 October 2026
- Competitors: 19 from 19 nations

Medalists
gold medal	Sujeet Kalkal	India
silver medal	Abdulmazhid Kudiev	Tajikistan
bronze medal	Kotaro Kiyooka	Japan
bronze medal	Nachyn Kuular	Kazakhstan

The men's freestyle 65 kilograms wrestling competition at the 2026 Asian Games in Nagoya was held on 2 October 2026 at the Inae Sports Center.

== Schedule ==
All times are Japan Standard Time (UTC+09:00)

Date	Time	Event
Friday, 2 October 2026	10:30	Qualifications
Friday, 2 October 2026	10:30	1/8 finals
Friday, 2 October 2026	10:30	1/4 finals
Friday, 2 October 2026	10:30	Semifinals
Friday, 2 October 2026	10:30	Repechages
Friday, 2 October 2026	18:00	Finals

== Results ==
Legend

- F — Won by fall

=== Main bracket ===
==== Final ====
Final
Sujeet Kalkal (IND)	10
Abdulmazhid Kudiev (TJK)	9

==== Top half ====
Qualifications
Thirawat Maithong (THA)	0
Ou Xuexian (CHN)	10

1/8 finals
Alibeg Alibegov (BRN)	5
Yun Jun-sik (KOR)	5
Ou Xuexian (CHN)	3
Kotaro Kiyooka (JPN)	9
Sujeet Kalkal (IND)	13
Sayed Omar Zazai (AFG)	3
Abbas Ebrahimzadeh (IRI)	11
Charles Fernando (SRI)	0

1/4 finals
Yun Jun-sik (KOR)	0
Kotaro Kiyooka (JPN)	3
Sujeet Kalkal (IND)	10
Abbas Ebrahimzadeh (IRI)	0

Semifinals
Kotaro Kiyooka (JPN)	3
Sujeet Kalkal (IND)	3

==== Bottom half ====
Qualifications
Ram Kishor Yadav (NEP)	0
Abdul Sattar (BAN)	10
Kim Kwang-jin (PRK)	13
Muhammad Abdullah (PAK)	2

1/8 finals
Abdulmazhid Kudiev (TJK)	13
Nachyn Kuular (KAZ)	2
Abdul Sattar (BAN)	0
Abdullatif Al-Bakri (KSA)	10
Umidjon Jalolov (UZB)	0
Kim Kwang-jin (PRK)	2
Altangereliin Ankh-Erdene (MGL)	7
Ernazar Akmataliev (KGZ)	8

1/4 finals
Abdulmazhid Kudiev (TJK)	11
Abdullatif Al-Bakri (KSA)	0
Kim Kwang-jin (PRK)	11
Ernazar Akmataliev (KGZ)	1

Semifinals
Abdulmazhid Kudiev (TJK)	11
Kim Kwang-jin (PRK)	0

=== Repechage ===
Repechage 2
Sayed Omar Zazai (AFG)	5
Abbas Ebrahimzadeh (IRI)	15
Nachyn Kuular (KAZ)	4^{F}
Abdullatif Al-Bakri (KSA)	0

Bronze medal matches
Abbas Ebrahimzadeh (IRI)	2
Kotaro Kiyooka (JPN)	3
Nachyn Kuular (KAZ)	7
Kim Kwang-jin (PRK)	5

== Final standing ==
Rank	Athlete
1st place, gold medalist(s)	Sujeet Kalkal (IND)
2nd place, silver medalist(s)	Abdulmazhid Kudiev (TJK)
3rd place, bronze medalist(s)	Kotaro Kiyooka (JPN)
3rd place, bronze medalist(s)	Nachyn Kuular (KAZ)
5	Abbas Ebrahimzadeh (IRI)
5	Kim Kwang-jin (PRK)
7	Ou Xuexian (CHN)
8	Abdul Sattar (BAN)
9	Abdullatif Al-Bakri (KSA)
10	Ernazar Akmataliev (KGZ)
11	Yun Jun-sik (KOR)
12	Sayed Omar Zazai (AFG)
13	Altangereliin Ankh-Erdene (MGL)
14	Alibeg Alibegov (BRN)
15	Muhammad Abdullah (PAK)
16	Umidjon Jalolov (UZB)
17	Thirawat Maithong (THA)
18	Ram Kishor Yadav (NEP)
19	Charles Fernando (SRI)
