= Rahman Amouzad =

Iranian freestyle wrestler

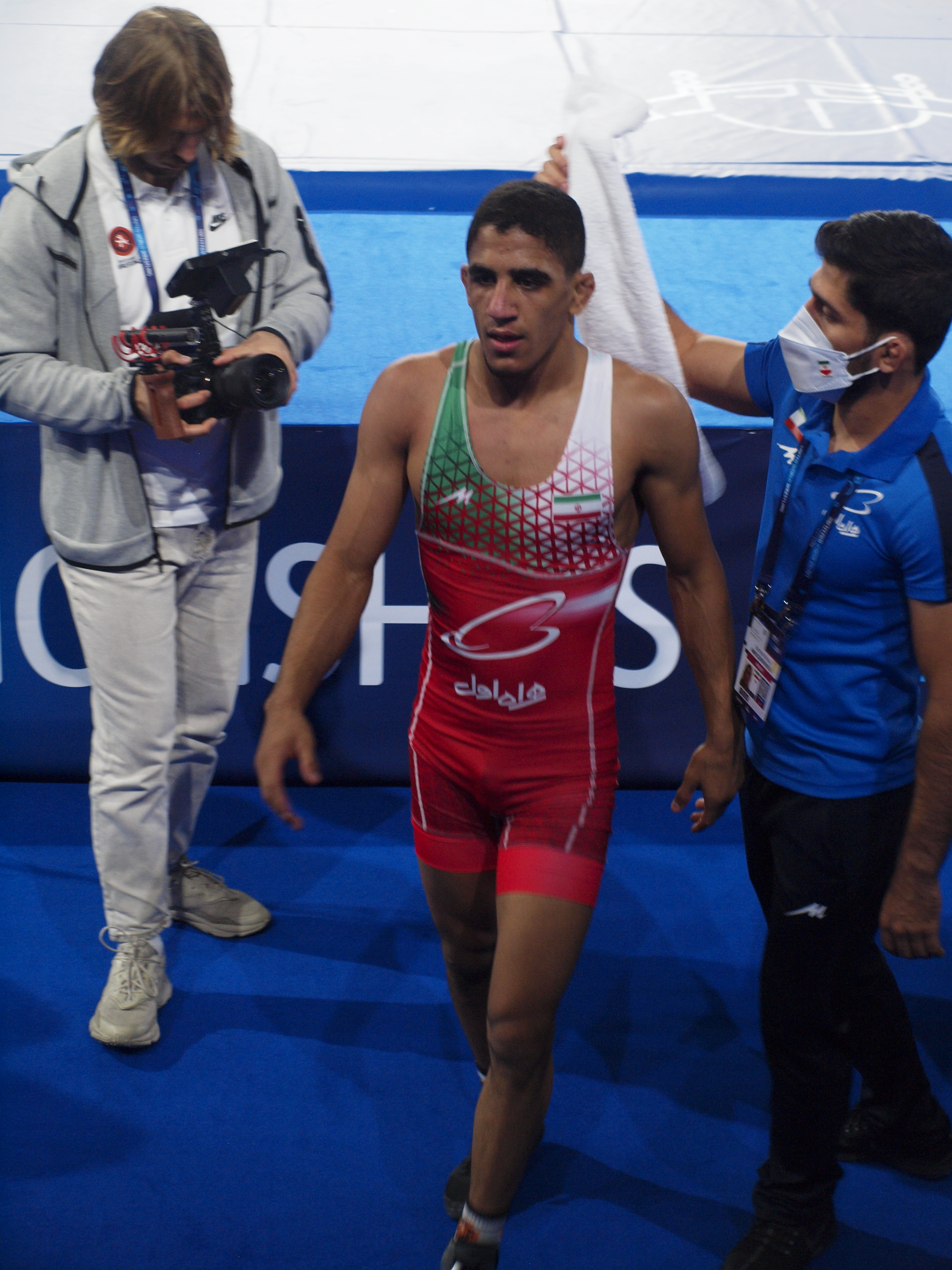
- Amouzad in 2021

Personal information
- Native name: رحمان عموزاد خلیلی
- Full name: Rahman Amouzad Khalili
- Nicknames: Ruthless; Black Panther
- Nationality: Iran
- Born: 17 July 2002 (age 24) Khalil Shahr, Behshahr, Mazandaran, Iran
- Height: 175 cm (5 ft 9 in)
- Weight: 65 kg (143 lb)

Sport
- Country: Iran
- Sport: Wrestling
- Weight class: 65 kg
- Event: Freestyle
Medal record
Men's freestyle wrestling
Representing Iran
Event	1st	2nd	3rd
Olympics Games	0	1	0
World Championships	2	0	1
Asian Championships	3	0	0
Asian Games	0	1	0
World U20 Championships	1	0	0
World Cadets Championships	2	0	0
Asian Cadets Championship	2	0	0
Other	5	2	1
Total	15	4	2
Olympic Games
Silver medal – second place	2024 Paris	65 kg
World Championships
Gold medal – first place	2022 Belgrade	65 kg
Gold medal – first place	2025 Zagreb	65 kg
Bronze medal – third place	2026 Astana	65 kg
Asian Championships
Gold medal – first place	2022 Ulaanbaatar	65 kg
Gold medal – first place	2023 Astana	65 kg
Gold medal – first place	2024 Bishkek	65 kg
Asian Games
Silver medal – second place	2022 Hangzhou	65 kg
Islamic Solidarity Games
Gold medal – first place	2025 Riyadh	65 kg
World Cup
Silver medal – second place	2022 Coralville	Team
Individual World Cup
Bronze medal – third place	2020 Belgrade	57 kg
Grand Prix
Gold medal – first place	2021 Istanbul	61 kg
Gold medal – first place	2021 Tehran	61 kg
Gold medal – first place	2025 Tirana	65 kg
Gold medal – first place	2026 Ulaanbaatar	65 kg
Silver medal – second place	2024 Zagreb	65 kg
U20 World Championships
Gold medal – first place	2021 Ufa	61 kg
U17 World Championships
Gold medal – first place	2019 Sofia	48 kg
Gold medal – first place	2018 Zagreb	45 kg
U17 Asian Championships
Gold medal – first place	2019 Nur-Sultan	48 kg
Gold medal – first place	2018 Tashkent	45 kg

Rahman Amouzad Khalili (Persian: رحمان عموزاد خلیلی; born 17 July 2001) is an Iranian freestyle wrestler who currently competes at 65 kilograms. The 2022 World champion, Amouzad reached silver medals while representing Iran at the 2024 Summer Olympics and the 2022 Asian Games.

A three-time age-group World champion, Amouzad has earned medals at multiple international tournaments, such as the Asian Championships and the Individual World Cup.

== Career ==
=== 2018–2020 ===
In 2018 and 2019, Amouzad claimed gold medals at the U17 World Championships and the U17 Asian Championships, at 45 and 48 kilograms respectively.

In October 2020, he competed at the Iranian Premier League for Islamic Azad University, scoring two wins at 61 kilograms on his senior level debut. In November, Amouzad trimmed down to 57 kilograms for the Iranian World Team Trials, dropping matches to Asian champion Reza Atri and U23 World medalist Alireza Sarlak. In December, he racked up two more wins for IAU at the Premier League.

A week later, Amouzad claimed a bronze medal at the Individual World Cup, winning four matches while losing one, to reigning World champion Zaur Uguev from Russia.

=== 2021 ===
In March, Amouzad competed in a rematch against Reza Atri for the Iranian Olympic Team spot, losing in a close bout on points. In May, he moved up to 61 kilograms and claimed the Takhi Cup, defeating four opponents on his way to a gold medal and a spot on the Iranian World Team. In June, Amouzad claimed the Yasar Dogu gold medal, notably defeating Asian champion Ulukbek Zholdoshbekov and Münir Recep Aktaş.

In August, Amouzad made his international U20 debut, becoming the 2021 U20 World Champion at 61 kilograms. At the Senior World Championships of October, Amouzad advanced to the second round after a win over Hungary, before being eliminated by Toshihiro Hasegawa from Japan to place eleventh.

=== 2022 ===
In April, Amouzad moved up to 65 kilograms and claimed his first Asian Continental title, defeating Olympic bronze medalist Bajrang Punia from India in the finals.

In September, he competed at the World Championships, running through a gauntlet and defeating reigning European champion Ismail Musukaev from Hungary, three-time World champion Haji Aliyev from Azerbaijan and Olympian Yun Jun-sik from South Korea, to reach the finals. The next day, he claimed the World title, defeating three-time NCAA champion Yianni Diakomihalis from the United States in a high-scoring match.

In December, Amouzad helped Iran to a silver-medal finish at the World Cup, defeating U23 Asian champion Taiyrbek Zhumashbek Uulu from the All-Stars team and Yianni Diakomihalis from the United States, in a rematch from the World finals.

=== 2025 ===
Amouzad won the gold medal at the 2025 World Wrestling Championships. At freestyle 65 kg, he defeated Ikromzhon Khadzhimurodov of Kazakhstan 13–0, and also defeated Real Woods of the United States of America, Sujeet Kalkal of India, and Peiman Biabani of Canada. In the final, he avenged his defeat in the 2024 Olympic final against Kotaro Kiyooka, winning 10–0.

== Freestyle record ==
Senior Freestyle Matches
Res.	Record	Opponent	Score	Date	Event	Location
loss	49–11	(Russia) Shamil Mamedov	7–10	November 23, 2024	PWL 7: Russia vs. Iran	Moscow, Russia
2024 Summer Olympics (silver) at 65 kg
Loss	49–10	(Japan) Kotaro Kiyooka	3–10	August 11, 2024	2024 Summer Olympics	Paris, France
Win	49–9	(Hungary) Ismail Musukaev	TF 10–0	August 10, 2024	2024 Summer Olympics	Paris, France
Win	48–9	(Albania) Islam Dudaev	TF 11–0	August 10, 2024	2024 Summer Olympics	Paris, France
Win	47–9	(United States) Zain Retherford	8–0	August 10, 2024	2024 Summer Olympics	Paris, France
2024 Asian Championships (gold) at 65 kg
Win	46–9	(Mongolia) Tömör-Ochiryn Tulga	2–1	11 April 2024	2024 Asian Championships	Bishkek, Kyrgyzstan
Win	45–9	(Uzbekistan) Abbos Rakhmonov	TF 10–0	11 April 2024	2024 Asian Championships	Bishkek, Kyrgyzstan
Win	44–9	(South Korea) Yoo Seon-ho	7–0	11 April 2024	2024 Asian Championships	Bishkek, Kyrgyzstan
Win	43–9	(Kyrgyzstan) Ulukbek Zholdoshbekov	4–2	11 April 2024	2024 Asian Championships	Bishkek, Kyrgyzstan
2024 Grand Prix Zagreb Open (silver) at 65 kg
Loss		(Armenia) Vazgen Tevanyan	FF	10–14 January 2024	2024 Grand Prix Zagreb Open	Zagreb, Croatia
Win	42–9	(Iran) Abbas Ebrahimzadeh	12–4	10–14 January 2024	2024 Grand Prix Zagreb Open	Zagreb, Croatia
Win	41–9	(Argentina) Agustín Destribats	TF 10–0	10–14 January 2024	2024 Grand Prix Zagreb Open	Zagreb, Croatia
Win	40–9	(China) Yuan Shaohua	TF 10–0	10–14 January 2024	2024 Grand Prix Zagreb Open	Zagreb, Croatia
Win	39–9	(Turkey) Abdullah Toprak	12–4	10–14 January 2024	2024 Grand Prix Zagreb Open	Zagreb, Croatia
2022 Asian Games (silver) at 65 kg
Loss	38–8	(Mongolia) Tömör-Ochiryn Tulga	TF 1–11	6 October 2023	2022 Asian Games	Hangzhou, China
Win	38–7	(India) Bajrang Punia	8–1	6 October 2023	2022 Asian Games	Hangzhou, China
Win	37–7	(China) Wei Baowen	6–0	6 October 2023	2022 Asian Games	Hangzhou, China
Win	36–7	(Japan) Kaiki Yamaguchi	2–1	6 October 2023	2022 Asian Games	Hangzhou, China
Win	35–7	(Uzbekistan) Abbos Rakhmonov	12–6	6 October 2023	2022 Asian Games	Hangzhou, China
2023 World Championships 5th at 65 kg
Win	34–7	(Moldova) Maxim Saculțan	TF 10–0	18–19 September 2023	2023 World Championships	Belgrade, Serbia
Loss	33–7	(Russia) Shamil Mamedov	6–8	18–19 September 2023	2023 World Championships	Belgrade, Serbia
Loss	33–6	(Hungary) Iszmail Muszukajev	5–6	18–19 September 2023	2023 World Championships	Belgrade, Serbia
Win	33–5	(United States) Nick Lee	7–4	18–19 September 2023	2023 World Championships	Belgrade, Serbia
Win	32–5	(Romania) Ștefan Coman	TF 12–0	18–19 September 2023	2023 World Championships	Belgrade, Serbia
Win	31–5	(Comoros) Yanisse Madi	TF 10–0	18–19 September 2023	2023 World Championships	Belgrade, Serbia
2023 Asian Championships (gold) at 65 kg
Win	30–5	(Mongolia) Tömör-Ochiryn Tulga	3–1	13 April 2023	2023 Asian Championships	Astana, Kazakhstan
Win	29–5	(Japan) Ryoma Anraku	2–1	13 April 2023	2023 Asian Championships	Astana, Kazakhstan
Win	28–5	(Kazakhstan) Sanzhar Mukhtar	6–0	13 April 2023	2023 Asian Championships	Astana, Kazakhstan
2022 World Cup at 65 kg – (silver) for Iran
Win	27–5	(United States) Yianni Diakomihalis	5–4	December 10–11, 2022	2022 World Cup	(United States) Coralville, Iowa
Win	26–5	(Kyrgyzstan) Taiyrbek Zhumashbek Uulu	5–0	December 10–11, 2022	2022 World Cup	(United States) Coralville, Iowa
2022 World Championships (gold) at 65 kg
Win	25–5	(United States) Yianni Diakomihalis	13–8	17–18 September 2022	2022 World Championships	Belgrade, Serbia
Win	24–5	(Azerbaijan) Haji Aliyev	9–2	17–18 September 2022	2022 World Championships	Belgrade, Serbia
Win	23–5	(Kazakhstan) Adil Ospanov	TF 13–2	17–18 September 2022	2022 World Championships	Belgrade, Serbia
Win	22–5	(Hungary) Iszmail Muszukajev	6–0	17–18 September 2022	2022 World Championships	Belgrade, Serbia
Win	21–5	(South Korea) Yun Jun-sik	8–1	17–18 September 2022	2022 World Championships	Belgrade, Serbia
2022 Asian Championships (gold) at 65 kg						Belgrade, Serbia
Win	20–5	(India) Bajrang Punia	3–1	23 April 2022	2022 Asian Championships	Ulaanbaatar, Mongolia
Win	19–5	(Mongolia) Tseveensürengiin Tsogbadrakh	6–0	23 April 2022	2022 Asian Championships	Ulaanbaatar, Mongolia
Win	18–5	(Japan) Kaiki Yamaguchi	9–0	23 April 2022	2022 Asian Championships	Ulaanbaatar, Mongolia
Win	17–5	(Pakistan) Inayat Ullah	TF 11–0	23 April 2022	2022 Asian Championships	Ulaanbaatar, Mongolia
2021 World Championships 11th at 61 kg
Loss	16–5	(Japan) Toshihiro Hasegawa	5–9	2 October 2021	2021 World Championships	Oslo, Norway
Win	16–4	(Hungary) Gamzatgadzsi Halidov	5–0	2 October 2021	2021 World Championships	Oslo, Norway
2021 Yasar Dogu (gold) at 61 kg
Win	15–4	(Kazakhstan) Assyl Aitakyn	4–0	25–27 June 2021	2021 Yasar Dogu International	Istanbul, Turkey
Win	14–4	(Turkey) Münir Recep Aktaş	8–1	25–27 June 2021	2021 Yasar Dogu International	Istanbul, Turkey
Win	13–4	(Kyrgyzstan) Ulukbek Zholdoshbekov	8–6	25–27 June 2021	2021 Yasar Dogu International	Istanbul, Turkey
2021 Takhi Cup (gold) at 61 kg
Win	12–4	(Iran) Mohammad Ramezanpour	3–1	20 May 2021	2021 Takhi Cup	Tehran, Iran
Win	11–4	(Iran) Dariush Gholizadeh	TF 11–0	20 May 2021	2021 Takhi Cup	Tehran, Iran
Win	10–4	(Iran) Peyman Nemati	3–1	20 May 2021	2021 Takhi Cup	Tehran, Iran
Win	9–4	(Iran) Amir Hossein Khodabakhshi	6–1	20 May 2021	2021 Takhi Cup	Tehran, Iran
2021 Iranian Olympic Team Trials (silver) at 57 kg
Loss	8–4	(Iran) Reza Atri	4–6	9 March 2021	2021 Iranian Olympic Team Trials	Tehran, Iran
2020 Individual World Cup (bronze) at 57 kg
Win	8–3	(Belarus) Uladzislau Andreyeu	4–0	16 December 2020	2020 Individual World Cup	Belgrade, Serbia
Loss	7–3	(Russia) Zaur Uguev	Fall	16 December 2020	2020 Individual World Cup	Belgrade, Serbia
Win	7–2	(Guinea-Bissau) Diamantino Iuna Fafé	Fall	16 December 2020	2020 Individual World Cup	Belgrade, Serbia
Win	6–2	(Italy) Givi Davidovi	TF 11–0	16 December 2020	2020 Individual World Cup	Belgrade, Serbia
Win	5–2	(Turkey) Saban Kiziltas	TF 10–0	16 December 2020	2020 Individual World Cup	Belgrade, Serbia
2020 Iranian Premier League at 57 kg – (silver) for IAU
Win	4–2	(Iran) Erfan Jafarian	11–2	6 December 2020	2020 Iranian Premier League	Tehran, Iran
Win	3–2	(Iran) Reza Kharefi Safar	TF 10–0	6 December 2020	2020 Iranian Premier League	Tehran, Iran
2020 IRI World Team Trials (bronze) at 57 kg
Loss	2–2	(Iran) Alireza Sarlak	8–10	5 November 2020	2020 Iranian World Team Trials	Tehran, Iran
Win		(Iran) Nader Hajaghania	FF	5 November 2020	2020 Iranian World Team Trials	Tehran, Iran
Loss	2–1	(Iran) Reza Atri	4–4	5 November 2020	2020 Iranian World Team Trials	Tehran, Iran
2020 Iranian Premier League at 61 kg – (silver) for IAU
Win	2–0	(Iran) Younes Sarmasti	TF 10–0	2 October 2020	2020 Iranian Premier League	Tehran, Iran
Win	1–0	(Iran) Ehsan Ranjbar	TF 12–2	2 October 2020	2020 Iranian Premier League	Tehran, Iran
