= 2026 World Wrestling Championships – Men's freestyle 65 kg =

Men's freestyle 65 kg at the 2026 World Championships
- Venue: Barys Arena
- Dates: 29–30 October 2026
- Competitors: 32 from 32 nations

Medalists
gold medal	Bo Bassett	United States
silver medal	Vazgen Tevanyan	Armenia
bronze medal	Rahman Amouzad	Iran
bronze medal	Abasgadzhi Magomedov	Russia

The men's freestyle 65 kilograms is a competition featured at the 2026 World Wrestling Championships, and was held in Astana, Kazakhstan on 29 and 30 October 2026.

This freestyle wrestling competition consists of a single-elimination tournament, with a repechage used to determine the winner of two bronze medals. The two finalists face off for gold and silver medals. Each wrestler who loses to one of the two finalists moves into the repechage, culminating in a pair of bronze medal matches, featuring the semifinal losers each facing the remaining repechage opponent from their half of the bracket.

== Results ==
Legend

- F — Won by fall

=== Final ===
Final
Vazgen Tevanyan (ARM)	1
Bo Bassett (USA)	9

=== Top half ===
Round of 32
Rahman Amouzad (IRI)	13
Ayub Musaev (BEL)	2
Kaisei Tanabe (JPN)	3
Ahmet Duman (TUR)	3
Byambasürengiin Zeneemeder (MGL)	3
Vazgen Tevanyan (ARM)	9
Andrii Dzhelep (UKR)	1
Ossimzhan Dastanbek (KAZ)	3
Rashid Babazade (AZE)	8
Taiyrbek Zhumashbek Uulu (KGZ)	9
Sun Zezhong (CHN)	6
Mashrabjon Uzakov (UZB)	11
Agustín Destribats (ARG)	7
Joey Silva (PUR)	0
Nico Megerle (GER)	0
Shamil Mamedov (BUL)	11

Round of 16
Rahman Amouzad (IRI)	9
Ahmet Duman (TUR)	0
Vazgen Tevanyan (ARM)	2
Ossimzhan Dastanbek (KAZ)	1
Taiyrbek Zhumashbek Uulu (KGZ)	9
Mashrabjon Uzakov (UZB)	1
Agustín Destribats (ARG)	3
Shamil Mamedov (BUL)	7

Quarterfinals
Rahman Amouzad (IRI)	2
Vazgen Tevanyan (ARM)	3
Taiyrbek Zhumashbek Uulu (KGZ)	0
Shamil Mamedov (BUL)	6

Semifinals
Vazgen Tevanyan (ARM)	2
Shamil Mamedov (BUL)	1

=== Bottom half ===
Round of 32
Peiman Biabani (CAN)	0
Bo Bassett (USA)	3^{F}
Quentin Sticker (FRA)	12
Stephen Akintewe (NGR)	2
Shannon Hanna (BAH)	1
Ștefan Coman (ROU)	2
Abasgadzhi Magomedov (RUS)	11
Nika Zakashvili (GEO)	0
Alibeg Alibegov (BRN)	9
Oussama Laribi (ALG)	3
Abdulmazhid Kudiev (TJK)	14
Raby Bapelekia (CGO)	1
Ştefan Tonu (MDA)	0
Islam Guseinov (BLR)	13
Nino Leutert (SUI)	1
Sujeet Kalkal (IND)	12

Round of 16
Bo Bassett (USA)	12
Quentin Sticker (FRA)	0
Ștefan Coman (ROU)	0
Abasgadzhi Magomedov (RUS)	10
Alibeg Alibegov (BRN)	0
Abdulmazhid Kudiev (TJK)	10
Islam Guseinov (BLR)	0
Sujeet Kalkal (IND)	4

Quarterfinals
Bo Bassett (USA)	14
Abasgadzhi Magomedov (RUS)	13
Abdulmazhid Kudiev (TJK)	3
Sujeet Kalkal (IND)	3

Semifinals
Bo Bassett (USA)	12
Abdulmazhid Kudiev (TJK)	2

=== Repechage ===
Repechage round 1
Byambasürengiin Zeneemeder (MGL)	0
Ossimzhan Dastanbek (KAZ)	11
Peiman Biabani (CAN)	5
Quentin Sticker (FRA)	0

Repechage round 2
Ossimzhan Dastanbek (KAZ)	0
Rahman Amouzad (IRI)	11
Peiman Biabani (CAN)	0
Abasgadzhi Magomedov (RUS)	10

Bronze medals
Rahman Amouzad (IRI)	5
Shamil Mamedov (BUL)	4
Abasgadzhi Magomedov (RUS)	3
Abdulmazhid Kudiev (TJK)	2

== Final standing ==
Rank	Athlete
1st place, gold medalist(s)	Bo Bassett (USA)
2nd place, silver medalist(s)	Vazgen Tevanyan (ARM)
3rd place, bronze medalist(s)	Rahman Amouzad (IRI)
3rd place, bronze medalist(s)	Abasgadzhi Magomedov (RUS)
5	Shamil Mamedov (BUL)
5	Abdulmazhid Kudiev (TJK)
7	Sujeet Kalkal (IND)
8	Ossimzhan Dastanbek (KAZ)
9	Taiyrbek Zhumashbek Uulu (KGZ)
10	Islam Guseinov (BLR)
11	Quentin Sticker (FRA)
12	Mashrabjon Uzakov (UZB)
13	Agustín Destribats (ARG)
14	Alibeg Alibegov (BRN)
15	Peiman Biabani (CAN)
16	Ahmet Duman (TUR)
17	Ștefan Coman (ROU)
18	Rashid Babazade (AZE)
19	Sun Zezhong (CHN)
20	Kaisei Tanabe (JPN)
21	Oussama Laribi (ALG)
22	Byambasürengiin Zeneemeder (MGL)
23	Stephen Akintewe (NGR)
24	Shannon Hanna (BAH)
25	Andrii Dzhelep (UKR)
26	Nino Leutert (SUI)
27	Raby Bapelekia (CGO)
28	Ayub Musaev (BEL)
29	Joey Silva (PUR)
30	Nika Zakashvili (GEO)
31	Nico Megerle (GER)
32	Ştefan Tonu (MDA)
