= 2026 Pro Wrestling League =

Indian franchise wrestling season

The 2026 Pro Wrestling League was the 5th edition of the Pro Wrestling League, a franchise-based wrestling league organised by the Wrestling Federation of India. It was held from 11 January to 1 February 2026 at the Noida Indoor Stadium in Noida, Uttar Pradesh and Haryana Thunders are the champion The league returned after a seven-year hiatus, introducing six new franchises representing the cities of India.

The Sony Sports Network has been announced as the official broadcast partner for the 2026 season.

== Format ==
The 2026 season introduced new rules to enhance competitiveness and viewer engagement. The toss rule was modified so that the winning team captain can decide the order of bouts rather than blocking specific weight categories. A "power minute" was introduced for the final minute of each bout, during which all points scored are doubled, similar to a powerplay in cricket.

== Teams ==
=== Auction ===
The 2026 Auction was held on 3 January 2026 at the ITC Maurya, New Delhi. Each team was given a budget of ₹2 crore (US$210,000) to purchase 9 to 12 players, including at least 5 men and 4 women, with 2 overseas players in each category. 300 players were listed, of which 63 wrestlers were sold in the auction.

=== Squads ===
Delhi Dangal Warriors	Maharashtra Kesari	Punjab Royals	Tiigers of Mumbai Dangals	Haryana Thunders	UP Dominators
Men: (India) Sujeet Kalkal; (India) Ronak; (India) Shubham Kaushik; (Azerbaijan) Turan Bayramov; (Iran) Hadi Vafaiepour; Women: (India) Saarika; (India) Anjali; (Mexico) Karla Acosta; (Ukraine) Anastasiya Alpyeyeva	Men: (India) Atish Todkar; (India) Deepak Punia; (India) Sumit Malik; (India) Yash Tushir; (Poland) Robert Baran; (Armenia) Vazgen Tevanyan; Women: (India) Diksha Malik; (India) Harshita Mor; (India) Manisha Bhanwala; (Bulgaria) Bilyana Dudova; (Cuba) Yusneylys Guzmán	Men: (India) Akash; (India) Chander Mohan; (India) Chirag Chhikara; (India) Dinesh Dhankar; (India) Rounak Gulia; (Albania) Islam Dudaev; (Russia) Bagomedov Ada; Women: (India) Meenakshi; (India) Priya Malik; (India) Rajnita Jangra; (Canada) Ana Godinez; (Poland) Roksana Zasina	Men: (India) Aman Sehrawat; (India) Mukul Dahiya; (India) Naveen Malik; (India) Rohit Rahal; (Azerbaijan) Ali Rahimzade; (Ukraine) Oleksandr Khotsianivskyi; Women: (India) Jyoti Berwal; (India) Jyoti Sihag; (Poland) Olha Padoshyk; (Ukraine) Alina Filipovych	Men: (India) Anirudh Gulia; (India) Ankush; (India) Sachin; (India) Parvinder Nain; (Azerbaijan) Ashraf Ashirov; (Mongolia) Tömör-Ochiryn Tulga; Women: (India) Kajal Dhochak; (India) Neha Sharma; (India) Neha Sangwan; (Japan) Yui Susaki; (Ukraine) Iryna Koliadenko	Men: (India) Jaspooran Singh; (India) Rahul Derwal; (India) Sagar; (India) Vishal Kaliramana; (Armenia) Arman Andreasyan; (Ukraine) Vasyl Mykhailov; Women: (India) Antim Panghal; (India) Nisha Dahiya; (Nigeria) Ojo Damola Hannah; (United States) Bridgette Duty
