= Sebastian Rivera =

Stateside Puerto Rican freestyle wrestler (born 1998)

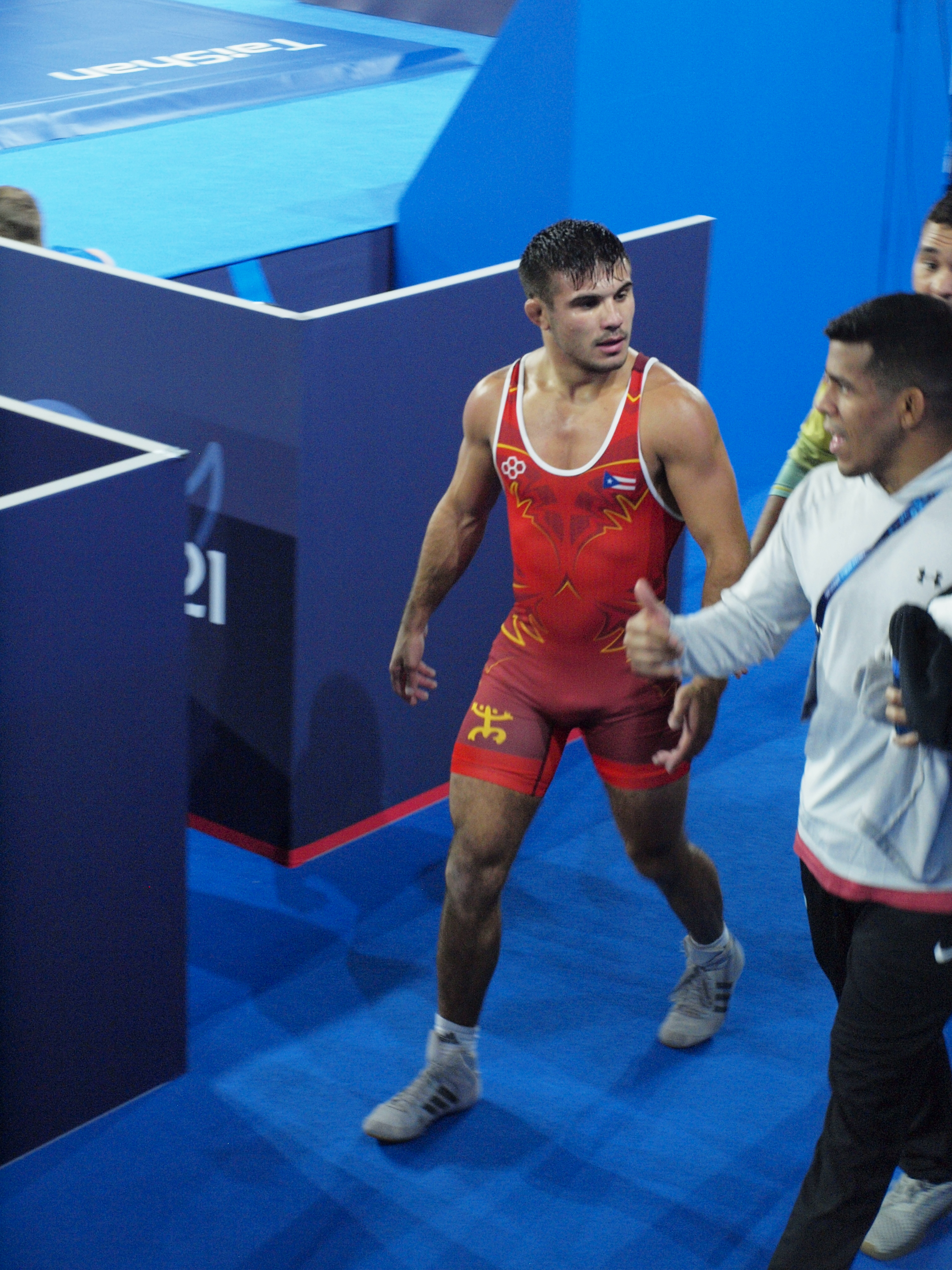
- Rivera in 2021

Personal information
- Full name: Sebastian C Rivera
- Nationality: United States; Puerto Rico
- Born: 27 August 1998 (age 28) Toms River, New Jersey, U.S.

Sport
- Country: Puerto Rico
- Sport: Wrestling
- Weight class: 65 kg (143 lb)
- Events: Freestyle and folkstyle
- College team: Rutgers; Northwestern
- Club: Rutgers Athletic Center
- Coached by: Scott Goodale

Achievements and titles
- World finals: (silver) (2023)
Medal record
Men's freestyle wrestling
Representing Puerto Rico
Olympic Games
Bronze medal – third place	2024 Paris	65 kg
World Championships
Silver medal – second place	2023 Belgrade	65 kg
Pan American Championships
Silver medal – second place	2022 Acapulco	65 kg
Bronze medal – third place	2023 Buenos Aires	65 kg
Central American and Caribbean Games
Silver medal – second place	2023 San Salvador	65 kg
Grand Prix
Gold medal – first place	2022 Rome	65 kg
Gold medal – first place	2022 Madrid	65 kg
Men's collegiate wrestling
NCAA Division I Championships
Representing the Northwestern Wildcats
Bronze medal – third place	2019 Pittsburgh	125 lb
Representing the Rutgers Scarlet Knights
Bronze medal – third place	2022 Detroit	141 lb

Sebastian C Rivera (born 27 August 1998) is a stateside Puerto Rican freestyle wrestler who competes internationally at 65 kilograms. The 2023 World silver medalist, he represented Puerto Rico at the 2024 Summer Olympics and the 2023 Central American and Caribbean Games, earning the bronze medal and silver medal, respectively.

== Career ==
Raised in New Jersey, Rivera started wrestling at a young age, winning prestigious tournaments in high school such as Super 32 and the New Jersey state championship as a senior out of Christian Brothers Academy. Entering Northwestern University in 2016, Rivera became a two-time All-American (2018 and 2019) and a two-time Big Ten Conference champion (2019 and 2020), but was not able to compete at the 2020 NCAA championships as they were canceled due to the COVID-19 pandemic (granting him a new year of eligibility).

Transferring to Rutgers University as a graduate student, Rivera claimed All-American honors once again in March 2021. After, he started representing Puerto Rico in freestyle competition, competing at the World Olympic Qualification Tournament (22nd), Pan American Championships (5th), World Championships (7th), and Puerto Rican Nationals (1st). Back to folkstyle season, Rivera once again became an All-American in 2022, concluding his college career.

In May 2022, Rivera claimed a silver medal at the Pan American Championships after making the finals. In June and July respectively, he became the prestigious Matteo Pellicone Ranking Series champion and the Grand Prix of Spain champion. He lost his bronze medal match in the 65 kg event at the 2022 World Wrestling Championships held in Belgrade, Serbia.

== Freestyle record ==
Senior Freestyle Matches
Res.	Record	Opponent	Score	Date	Event	Location
2025 World Wrestling Championships 7th at 65 kg
Loss	36-22	(Uzbekistan) Umidjon Jalolov	3-5	September 13, 2025	2025 World Wrestling Championships	Zagreb, Croatia
Win	36-21	(Georgia (country)) Goderdzi Dzebisashvili	TF 10–0	September 13, 2025	2025 World Wrestling Championships	Zagreb, Croatia
Win	35-21	(Algeria) Chouaib Sahraoui	Fall	September 13, 2025	2025 World Wrestling Championships	Zagreb, Croatia
2024 Olympic Games (bronze) at 65 kg
Win	34-21	(Mongolia) Tömör-Ochiryn Tulga	10–9	August 5, 2024	2024 Olympic Games	Paris, France
Win	33-21	(Moldova) Maxim Saculțan	TF 15–4	August 5, 2024	2024 Olympic Games	Paris, France
Loss	32-21	(Japan) Kotaro Kiyooka	6-8	August 5, 2024	2024 Olympic Games	Paris, France
Win	32-20	(Australia) Georgii Okorokov	TF 12–2	August 5, 2024	2024 Olympic Games	Paris, France
2024 Grand Prix Zagreb Open 5th at 65 kg
Loss	31-20	(United States) Joey McKenna	TF 0–10	January 10, 2024	2024 Grand Prix Zagreb Open	Zagreb, Croatia
Loss	31-19	(Armenia) Vazgen Tevanyan	1-9	January 10, 2024	2024 Grand Prix Zagreb Open	Zagreb, Croatia
Win	31-18	(Israel) Josh Finesilver	7–2	January 10, 2024	2024 Grand Prix Zagreb Open	Zagreb, Croatia
Win	30-18	(Bulgaria) Mikyay Naim	3–1	January 10, 2024	2024 Grand Prix Zagreb Open	Zagreb, Croatia
2023 World Wrestling Championships (silver) at 65 kg
Loss	29-18	(Hungary) Ismail Musukaev	TF 0–11	September 23, 2023	2023 World Wrestling Championships	Belgrade, Serbia
Win	29-17	(Armenia) Vazgen Tevanyan	10–9	September 23, 2023	2023 World Wrestling Championships	Belgrade, Serbia
Win	28-17	(Moldova) Maxim Saculțan	TF 15–4	September 23, 2023	2023 World Wrestling Championships	Belgrade, Serbia
Win	27-17	(Belarus) Ayub Musaev	TF 10–0	September 23, 2023	2023 World Wrestling Championships	Belgrade, Serbia
Win	26-17	(Bahrain) Alibeg Alibegov	TF 10–0	September 23, 2023	2023 World Wrestling Championships	Belgrade, Serbia
2023 Central American and Caribbean Games (silver) at 65 kg
Loss	25-17	(Cuba) Alejandro Valdés	TF 0-10	June 26–28, 2023	2023 Central American and Caribbean Games	San Salvador, El Salvador
Win	25-16	(Mexico) Cristian Santiago	7-1	June 26–28, 2023	2023 Central American and Caribbean Games	San Salvador, El Salvador
Win	24-16	(El Salvador) Juan Rodriguez	TF 10-0	June 26–28, 2023	2023 Central American and Caribbean Games	San Salvador, El Salvador
2023 Pan American Wrestling Championships (bronze) at 65 kg
Win	23-16	(Dominican Republic) Álbaro Rudesindo	9–2	May 6, 2023	2023 Pan American Wrestling Championships	Buenos Aires, Argentina
Loss	22-16	(Cuba) Alejandro Valdés	TF 0–10	May 6, 2023	2023 Pan American Wrestling Championships	Buenos Aires, Argentina
Win	22-15	(Colombia) Euclides Cuero Munoz	TF 10–0	May 6, 2023	2023 Pan American Wrestling Championships	Buenos Aires, Argentina
Win	21-15	(Brazil) Matheus Luz Barreto	TF 11–0	May 6, 2023	2023 Pan American Wrestling Championships	Buenos Aires, Argentina
2023 Ibrahim Moustafa Tournament 5th at 65 kg
Loss	20-15	(Ukraine) Erik Arushanian	2-8	February 26, 2023	2023 Ibrahim Moustafa Tournament	Alexandria, Egypt
Loss	20-14	(United States) Joey McKenna	2-10	February 26, 2023	2023 Ibrahim Moustafa Tournament	Alexandria, Egypt
Win	20-13	(India) Sujeet Kalkal	9–7	February 26, 2023	2023 Ibrahim Moustafa Tournament	Alexandria, Egypt
Win	19-13	(Kyrgyzstan) Alibek Osmonov	15–7	February 26, 2023	2023 Ibrahim Moustafa Tournament	Alexandria, Egypt
2023 Grand Prix Zagreb Open DNP at 65 kg
Loss	18-13	(United States) Nick Lee	TF 2–13	February 5, 2023	2023 Grand Prix Zagreb Open	Zagreb, Croatia
2022 World Wrestling Championships 5th at 65 kg
Loss	18-12	(India) Bajrang Punia	9-11	September 10, 2022	2022 World Wrestling Championships	Belgrade, Serbia
Loss	18-11	(United States) Yianni Diakomihalis	TF 0–10	September 10, 2022	2022 World Wrestling Championships	Belgrade, Serbia
Win	18-10	(Mongolia) Tseveensürengiin Tsogbadrakh	8–1	September 10, 2022	2022 World Wrestling Championships	Belgrade, Serbia
Win	17-10	(Turkey) Cavit Acar	TF 11–1	September 10, 2022	2022 World Wrestling Championships	Belgrade, Serbia
2022 Grand Prix of Spain (gold) at 65 kg
Win	16-10	(Romania) Nikolai Okhlopkov	8–4	July 8, 2022	2022 Grand Prix of Spain	Madrid, Spain
Win	15-10	(Canada) Lachlan McNeil	4–2	July 8, 2022	2022 Grand Prix of Spain	Madrid, Spain
Win	14-10	(Germany) Leon Gerstenberger	13–4	July 8, 2022	2022 Grand Prix of Spain	Madrid, Spain
2022 Matteo Pellicone (gold) at 65 kg
Win	13-10	(Ukraine) Erik Arushanian	14–9	June 25, 2022	2022 Matteo Pellicone	Rome, Italy
Win	12-10	(Italy) Shamil Omarov	5–4	June 25, 2022	2022 Matteo Pellicone	Rome, Italy
Win	11-10	(Turkey) Hamza Alaca	10–8	June 25, 2022	2022 Matteo Pellicone	Rome, Italy
2022 Pan American Wrestling Championships (silver) at 65 kg
Loss	10-10	(United States) Joey McKenna	TF 0–10	May 4, 2022	2022 Pan American Wrestling Championships	Acapulco, Mexico
Win	10-9	(Canada) Jacob Torres	TF 11–0	May 4, 2022	2022 Pan American Wrestling Championships	Acapulco, Mexico
Win	9-9	(Dominican Republic) Álbaro Rudesindo	Pin	May 4, 2022	2022 Pan American Wrestling Championships	Acapulco, Mexico
2021 World Wrestling Championships 7th at 65 kg
Loss	8-9	(Poland) Krzysztof Bienkowski	6–7	October 1, 2021	2021 World Wrestling Championships	Oslo, Norway
Win	8-8	(Austria) Gabriel Janatsch	TF 10–0	October 1, 2021	2021 World Wrestling Championships	Oslo, Norway
Loss	7-8	(Iran) Amir Mohammad Yazdani	TF 3–13	October 1, 2021	2021 World Wrestling Championships	Oslo, Norway
Win	7-7	(Moldova) Maxim Saculțan	14–9	October 1, 2021	2021 World Wrestling Championships	Oslo, Norway
2021 Pan American Wrestling Championships 5th at 65 kg
Loss	6-7	(Dominican Republic) Álbaro Rudesindo	TF 0–10	May 30, 2021	2021 Pan American Wrestling Championships	Guatemala City, Guatemala
Loss	6-6	(United States) Joey McKenna	TF 0–10	May 30, 2021	2021 Pan American Wrestling Championships	Guatemala City, Guatemala
Win	6-5	(Argentina) Agustin Destribats	6–1	May 30, 2021	2021 Pan American Wrestling Championships	Guatemala City, Guatemala
Win	5-5	(Mexico) Alexis Olvera Magallanes	TF 10–0	May 30, 2021	2021 Pan American Wrestling Championships	Guatemala City, Guatemala
2021 World Wrestling Olympic Qualification Tournament DNP at 65 kg
Loss	4-5	(Ukraine) Hor Ohannesian	1–5	May 6, 2021	2021 World Wrestling Olympic Qualification Tournament	Sofia, Bulgaria
Win	4-4	(United States) Shelton Mack	TF 13–3	January 3, 2021	2021 Battle on the Banks	(United States) Piscataway, New Jersey
2017 Dave Schultz Memorial DNP at 57 kg
Loss	3-4	(Japan) Yudai Fujita	2–8	February 1, 2017	2017 Dave Schultz Memorial	(United States) Colorado Springs, Colorado
Win	3-3	(United States) David Terao	9–6	February 1, 2017	2017 Dave Schultz Memorial	(United States) Colorado Springs, Colorado
Win	2-3	(United States) Tony DeCesare	TF 10–0	February 1, 2017	2017 Dave Schultz Memorial	(United States) Colorado Springs, Colorado
Loss	1-3	(United States) Tyler Graff	TF 0–10	February 1, 2017	2017 Dave Schultz Memorial	(United States) Colorado Springs, Colorado
2016 Bill Farrell International DNP at 57 kg
Loss	1-2	(United States) Frank Perrelli	TF 0–10	November 9, 2016	2016 Bill Farrell International	(United States) New York City
Win	1-1	(Kyrgyzstan) Nudyrdek Uulusamat	Pin	November 9, 2016	2016 Bill Farrell International	(United States) New York City
Loss	0-1	(Uzbekistan) Nodirjon Safarov	TF 0–10	November 9, 2016	2016 Bill Farrell International	(United States) New York City

== Achievements ==
Year	Competition	Venue	Position	Event
Representing Puerto Rico
2021	World Wrestling Championships	Oslo, Norway	7th	Freestyle 65 kg
2022	World Wrestling Championships	Belgrade, Serbia	5th	Freestyle 65 kg
2023	World Wrestling Championships	Belgrade, Serbia	2nd	Freestyle 65 kg
2024	Summer Olympic Games	Paris, France	3rd	Freestyle 65 kg

Olympic Games
Preceded by William Flaherty	Flagbearer for Puerto Rico with Jasmine Camacho-Quinn; Paris 2024	Succeeded by Incumbent
