= Sujeet Kalkal =

Indian freestyle wrestler (born 2002)

Personal information
- Born: 5 November 2002 (age 24) Imlota, Haryana, India
- Height: 1.66 m (5 ft 5 in)

Sport
- Sport: Wrestling
- Weight class: 65 kg
- Event: Freestyle
- Coached by: Emzarios Bentinidis
Medal record
Men's freestyle wrestling
Representing India
Asian Games
Gold medal – first place	2026 Aichi–Nagoya	65 kg
Asian Championships
Gold medal – first place	2026 Bishkek	65 kg
Grand Prix
Gold medal – first place	2022 Tunis	65 kg
Gold medal – first place	2025 Budapest	65 kg
Gold medal – first place	2026 Zagreb	65 kg
Gold medal – first place	2026 Tirana	65 kg
U23 World Championships
Gold medal – first place	2025 Novi Sad	65 kg
Bronze medal – third place	2024 Tirana	70 kg
U23 Asian Championships
Gold medal – first place	2022 Bishkek	65 kg
Gold medal – first place	2025 Vung Tau	65 kg
U20 World Championships
Bronze medal – third place	2022 Sofia	65 kg
U20 Asian Championships
Gold medal – first place	2022 Manama	65 kg

Sujeet Kalkal (born 5 November 2002) is an Indian freestyle wrestler who competes in the 65 kg division. He has won gold medals at the 2026 Asian Games and the 2026 Asian Championships.

== Biography ==
Sujeet was born on 5 November 2002 in Imlota, Charkhi Dadri district, Haryana. He was trained in wrestling by his father Dayanand Kalkal. He is described to have a solid defense and quick movement across the mat.

Kalkal rose to prominence with a gold medal in the 65 kg category at the 2022 U23 Asian Championships at Bishkek. In 2024, he won a bronze medal in the 70 kg category at the U23 World Wrestling Championships, contributing to India's tally of nine medals. In August 2025, he was selected to represent India at the 2025 World Wrestling Championships after winning the 65 kg category.

For the 2022 Asian Games, Olympic medalist Bajrang Punia was selected to represent India in the 65 kg category without a trial. Kalkal criticised the selection process and has been vocal about the need for fair trial processes. Kalkal was part of the Indian team for the 2026 Asian Games at Nagoya. He won the gold medal in the 65 kg event.

== Freestyle record ==
Res.	Record	Opponent	Score	Date	Event	Location	Category	Results
Loss	61-9	(Tajikistan) Abdulmazhid Kudiev	3-3*	29-30 October 2026	2026 World Wrestling Championships	Astana, Kazakhstan	65 kg	7th
Win	61-8	(Belarus) Islam Guseinov	4-0	29-30 October 2026	2026 World Wrestling Championships	Astana, Kazakhstan	65 kg	7th
Win	60-8	(Switzerland) Nino Leutert	12-1	29-30 October 2026	2026 World Wrestling Championships	Astana, Kazakhstan	65 kg	7th
Win	59-8	(Tajikistan) Abdulmazhid Kudiev	10-9	2 October 2026	2026 Asian Games	Nagoya, Japan	65 kg	Gold
Win	58-8	(Japan) Kotaro Kiyooka	3*-3	2 October 2026	2026 Asian Games	Nagoya, Japan	65 kg	Gold
Win	57-8	(Iran) Abbas Ebrahimzadehsavadkouhi	10-0	2 October 2026	2026 Asian Games	Nagoya, Japan	65 kg	Gold
Win	56-8	(Afghanistan) Sayed Omar Zazai	13-3	2 October 2026	2026 Asian Games	Nagoya, Japan	65 kg	Gold
Win	55-8	(Russia) Alik Khadartsev	15-4	5–6 September 2026	2026 Khadartsev Brothers Cup	Vladikavkaz, Russia	65 kg	Gold
Win	54-8	(Russia) Dzhambulat Kizinov	10-0	5–6 September 2026	2026 Khadartsev Brothers Cup	Vladikavkaz, Russia	65 kg	Gold
Win	53-8	(Russia) Viktor Yakovlev	11-0	5–6 September 2026	2026 Khadartsev Brothers Cup	Vladikavkaz, Russia	65 kg	Gold
Win	52-8	(Austria) Ismail Ayguen	10-0	5–6 September 2026	2026 Khadartsev Brothers Cup	Vladikavkaz, Russia	65 kg	Gold
Win	51-8	(Russia) Ibragim Ibragimov	6-4	2 May 2026	Professional Wrestling League	Yuzhno-Sakhalinsk, Russia	65 kg	Gold
Win	50-8	(Uzbekistan) Umidjon Jalolov	8–1	10–11 April 2026	2026 Asian Wrestling Championships	Bishkek, Kyrgyzstan	65 kg	Gold
Win	49-8	(Tajikistan) Abdulmazhid Kudiev	7–2	10–11 April 2026	2026 Asian Wrestling Championships	Bishkek, Kyrgyzstan	65 kg	Gold
Win	48-8	(Kyrgyzstan) Rustamzhan Kakharov	10–0	10–11 April 2026	2026 Asian Wrestling Championships	Bishkek, Kyrgyzstan	65 kg	Gold
Win	47-8	(Azerbaijan) Rashid Babazade	10–0	25 February 2026	2026 Muhamet Malo Tournament	Tirana, Albania	65 kg	Gold
Win	46-8	(United States) Joseph McKenna	11–0	25 February 2026	2026 Muhamet Malo Tournament	Tirana, Albania	65 kg	Gold
Win	45-8	(Georgia (country)) Nika Zakashvili	10–0	25 February 2026	2026 Muhamet Malo Tournament	Tirana, Albania	65 kg	Gold
Win	44-8	(Albania) Endrio Avdyli	16–4	25 February 2026	2026 Muhamet Malo Tournament	Tirana, Albania	65 kg	Gold
Win	43-8	(Iran) Peyman Nemati	3–0	4 February 2026	2026 Grand Prix Zagreb Open	Zagreb, Croatia	65 kg	Gold
Win	42-8	(United States) Joseph McKenna	11–0	4 February 2026	2026 Grand Prix Zagreb Open	Zagreb, Croatia	65 kg	Gold
Win	41-8	(France) Khamzat Arsamerzouev	10–0	4 February 2026	2026 Grand Prix Zagreb Open	Zagreb, Croatia	65 kg	Gold
Win	40-8	(Uzbekistan) Umidjon Jalolov	10–0	26–27 October 2025	2025 U23 World Wrestling Championships	Novi Sad, Serbia	65 kg	Gold
Win	39-8	(Japan) Yuto Nishiuchi	3–2	26–27 October 2025	2025 U23 World Wrestling Championships	Novi Sad, Serbia	65 kg	Gold
Win	38-8	(Russia) Bashir Magomedov	4–2	26–27 October 2025	2025 U23 World Wrestling Championships	Novi Sad, Serbia	65 kg	Gold
Win	37-8	(Poland) Dominik Jagusz	11–0	26–27 October 2025	2025 U23 World Wrestling Championships	Novi Sad, Serbia	65 kg	Gold
Win	36-8	(Moldova) Fiodor Ceavdari	12–2	26–27 October 2025	2025 U23 World Wrestling Championships	Novi Sad, Serbia	65 kg	Gold
Loss	35-8	(United States) Real Woods	5–7	15–16 September 2025	2025 World Wrestling Championships	Zagreb, Croatia	65 kg	8th
Loss	35-7	(Iran) Rahman Amouzad	5–6	15–16 September 2025	2025 World Wrestling Championships	Zagreb, Croatia	65 kg	8th
Win	35-6	(North Korea) Kim Kwang-jin	9–2	15–16 September 2025	2025 World Wrestling Championships	Zagreb, Croatia	65 kg	8th
Win	34-6	(Turkey) Cavit Acar	15–5	15–16 September 2025	2025 World Wrestling Championships	Zagreb, Croatia	65 kg	8th
Win	33-6	(Azerbaijan) Ali Rahimzade	5–1	17 July 2025	2025 Polyák Imre & Varga János Memorial Tournament	Budapest, Hungary	65 kg	Gold
Win	32-6	(Armenia) Vazgen Tevanyan	6–1	17 July 2025	2025 Polyák Imre & Varga János Memorial Tournament	Budapest, Hungary	65 kg	Gold
Win	31-6	(France) Khamzat Arsamerzouev	11–0	17 July 2025	2025 Polyák Imre & Varga János Memorial Tournament	Budapest, Hungary	65 kg	Gold
Win	30-6	(Albania) Islam Dudaev	11–0	17 July 2025	2025 Polyák Imre & Varga János Memorial Tournament	Budapest, Hungary	65 kg	Gold
Win	29-6	(Uzbekistan) Umidjon Jalolov	10–0	18–26 June 2025	2025 U23 Asian Championships	Vũng Tàu, Vietnam	65 kg	Gold
Win	28-6	(Kazakhstan) Rustem Tolen	11–0	18–26 June 2025	2025 U23 Asian Championships	Vũng Tàu, Vietnam	65 kg	Gold
Win	27-6	(Turkmenistan) Jelaletdin Seyidov	11–0	18–26 June 2025	2025 U23 Asian Championships	Vũng Tàu, Vietnam	65 kg	Gold
Win	26-6	(Singapore) McLaren Ravin Marren	10–0	18–26 June 2025	2025 U23 Asian Championships	Vũng Tàu, Vietnam	65 kg	Gold
Win	25-6	(Uzbekistan) Umidjon Jalolov	10–0	18–26 June 2025	2025 U23 Asian Championships	Vũng Tàu, Vietnam	65 kg	Gold
Loss		(Uzbekistan) Umidjon Jalolov	FF	29 March 2025	2025 Asian Wrestling Championships	Amman, Jordan	65 kg	7th
Loss	24-6	(Japan) Kaisei Tanabe	VIN	29 March 2025	2025 Asian Wrestling Championships	Amman, Jordan	65 kg	7th
Win	24-5	(Palestine) Abdullah Assaf	10–0	29 March 2025	2025 Asian Wrestling Championships	Amman, Jordan	65 kg	7th
Win	23-5	(Tajikistan) Mustafo Akhmedov	13–4	26–27 October 2024	2024 U23 World Wrestling Championships	Tirana, Albania	70 kg	Bronze
Loss	22-5	(Azerbaijan) Magomed Khaniev	VFA	26–27 October 2024	2024 U23 World Wrestling Championships	Tirana, Albania	70 kg	Bronze
Win	22-4	(Ukraine) Narek Pohosian	6–1	26–27 October 2024	2024 U23 World Wrestling Championships	Tirana, Albania	70 kg	Bronze
Win	21-4	(Mongolia) Erdenebatyn Tögsjargal	7–4	26–27 October 2024	2024 U23 World Wrestling Championships	Tirana, Albania	70 kg	Bronze
Win	20-4	(Bulgaria) Georgi Zhizgov	10–0	26–27 October 2024	2024 U23 World Wrestling Championships	Tirana, Albania	70 kg	Bronze
Loss	19-4	(United States) Zain Retherford	2–2*	11–12 May 2024	2024 World Wrestling Olympic Qualification Tournament	Istanbul, Turkey	65 kg	5th
Loss	19-3	(Mongolia) Tömör-Ochiryn Tulga	1–6	11–12 May 2024	2024 World Wrestling Olympic Qualification Tournament	Istanbul, Turkey	65 kg	5th
Win	19-2	(Canada) Lachlan McNeil	10–0	11–12 May 2024	2024 World Wrestling Olympic Qualification Tournament	Istanbul, Turkey	65 kg	5th
Win	18-2	(South Korea) Yun Jun-sik	10–0	11–12 May 2024	2024 World Wrestling Olympic Qualification Tournament	Istanbul, Turkey	65 kg	5th
Win	17-2	(Uzbekistan) Umidjon Jalolov	3–2	11–12 May 2024	2024 World Wrestling Olympic Qualification Tournament	Istanbul, Turkey	65 kg	5th
Loss	16-2	(Puerto Rico) Sebastian Rivera	7–9	26 February 2023	2023 Ibrahim Moustafa Tournament	Alexandria, Egypt	65 kg	11th
Win	16-1	(Uzbekistan) Abbos Rakhmonov	6–0	26 February 2023	2023 Ibrahim Moustafa Tournament	Alexandria, Egypt	65 kg	11th
Win	15-1	(Ukraine) Mykyta Zubal	12-1	15-21 August 2022	2022 U20 World Wrestling Championships	Sofia, Bulgaria	65 kg	Bronze
Loss	14-1	(Azerbaijan) Ziraddin Bayramov	2-6	15-21 August 2022	2022 U20 World Wrestling Championships	Sofia, Bulgaria	65 kg	Bronze
Win	14–0	(Belgium) Ayub Musaev	11-0	15-21 August 2022	2022 U20 World Wrestling Championships	Sofia, Bulgaria	65 kg	Bronze
Win	13–0	(Moldova) Pavel Graur	11-0	15-21 August 2022	2022 U20 World Wrestling Championships	Sofia, Bulgaria	65 kg	Bronze
Win	12–0	(Guatemala) Jonnathan Alejandro Perez Castellanos	6-0	15-21 August 2022	2022 U20 World Wrestling Championships	Sofia, Bulgaria	65 kg	Bronze
Win	11–0	(Argentina) Agustín Destribats	15–4	17 July 2022	2022 Tunis Ranking Series	Tunis, Tunisia	65 kg	Gold
Win	10–0	(Kazakhstan) Adlan Askarov	14–4	17 July 2022	2022 Tunis Ranking Series	Tunis, Tunisia	65 kg	Gold
Win	9–0	(United States) Yianni Diakomihalis	8–2	17 July 2022	2022 Tunis Ranking Series	Tunis, Tunisia	65 kg	Gold
Win	8–0	(Japan) Makoto Hosokawa	7-0	2-10 July 2022	2022 U20 Asian Championships	Manama, Bahrain	65 kg	Gold
Win	7–0	(Mongolia) Munkherdene Purevjav	11–0	2-10 July 2022	2022 U20 Asian Championships	Manama, Bahrain	65 kg	Gold
Win	6–0	(Kazakhstan) Olzhas Olzhakanov	3-1	2-10 July 2022	2022 U20 Asian Championships	Manama, Bahrain	65 kg	Gold
Win	5–0	(Iraq) Yousif Al-Dulaimi	10–0	2-10 July 2022	2022 U20 Asian Championships	Manama, Bahrain	65 kg	Gold
Win	4–0	(Kazakhstan) Adlan Askarov	10–2	19–26 June 2022	2022 U23 Asian Championships	Bishkek, Kyrgyzstan	65 kg	Gold
Win	3–0	(Mongolia) Namsrai Batbayar	10–0	19–26 June 2022	2022 U23 Asian Championships	Bishkek, Kyrgyzstan	65 kg	Gold
Win	2–0	(Kyrgyzstan) Ikromzhan Khadzhimuradov	14–4	19–26 June 2022	2022 U23 Asian Championships	Bishkek, Kyrgyzstan	65 kg	Gold
Win	1–0	(Turkmenistan) Gurbanmuhammet Charyyev	10–0	19–26 June 2022	2022 U23 Asian Championships	Bishkek, Kyrgyzstan	65 kg	Gold
