= Muhammad Gulzar =

Pakistani freestyle wrestler

Personal information
- Nationality: Pakistani

Sport
- Country: Pakistan
- Sport: Wrestling
- Weight class: 97 kg
- Event: Freestyle wrestling
Medal record
Men's freestyle wrestling
Representing Pakistan
Islamic Solidarity Games
Bronze medal – third place	Riyadh 2025	97 kg

Muhammad Gulzar is a Pakistani freestyle wrestler. He competed at the 2025 Islamic Solidarity Games, winning the bronze medal in the 97 kg event.
