= 2024 U23 World Wrestling Championships – Men's freestyle 70 kg =

Wrestling competitions

Men's freestyle 70 kg at the 2024 U23 World Championships
- Venue: Tirana Olympic Park
- Dates: 26–27 October
- Competitors: 25 from 23 nations

Medalists
gold medal	Magomed Khaniev	Azerbaijan
silver medal	Magomed-Emi Eltemirov	Authorised Neutral Athletes
bronze medal	Sujeet Kalkal	India
bronze medal	Yoshinosuke Aoyagi	Japan

The men's freestyle 70 kilograms is a competition featured at the 2024 U23 World Wrestling Championships, and will be held in Tirana, Albania on 26 and 27 October 2024.

This freestyle wrestling competition consists of a single-elimination tournament, with a repechage used to determine the winner of two bronze medals. The two finalists face off for gold and silver medals. Each wrestler who loses to one of the two finalists moves into the repechage, culminating in a pair of bronze medal matches featuring the semifinal losers each facing the remaining repechage opponent from their half of the bracket.

== Results ==
Legend

- F — Won by fall
- WO — Won by walkover

=== Final ===
Final
Magomed Khaniev (AZE)	5
Magomed-Emi Eltemirov (AIN)	4

=== Top half ===
Round of 32
Bayin Erihetu (CHN)	2
Narek Pohosian (UKR)	6
Georgi Zhizgov (BUL)	0
Sujeet Kalkal (IND)	10
~~Egzon Xhoni (KOS)~~
Erdenebatyn Tögsjargal (MGL)	WO
Shehabeldin Mohamed (EGY)	9
Mikita Dzemchanka (AIN)	2
Magomed Khaniev (AZE)	7^{F}
Muhammad Abdurachmanov (BEL)	0

Round of 16
Mateusz Łuszczyński (POL)	0
Narek Pohosian (UKR)	10
Sujeet Kalkal (IND)	7
Erdenebatyn Tögsjargal (MGL)	4
Mustafo Akhmedov (TJK)	4
Shehabeldin Mohamed (EGY)	0
Magomed Khaniev (AZE)	10
Eligh Rivera (PUR)	0

Quarterfinals
Narek Pohosian (UKR)	1
Sujeet Kalkal (IND)	6
Mustafo Akhmedov (TJK)	4
Magomed Khaniev (AZE)	10

Semifinals
Sujeet Kalkal (IND)	4
Magomed Khaniev (AZE)	8^{F}

=== Bottom half ===
Round of 32
Davit Patsinashvili (GEO)	4
John Wiley (USA)	5
Yoshinosuke Aoyagi (JPN)	9^{F}
Heung Tsz Hei (HKG)	0
Yernur Nurgazy (KAZ)	9
Umut Erdoğan (TUR)	5
Jorge Gatica (CHI)	0
Constantin Chirilov (MDA)	11

Round of 16
Tigran Ghazaryan (ARM)	5
John Wiley (USA)	3
Yoshinosuke Aoyagi (JPN)	4
Magomed-Emi Eltemirov (AIN)	7
Kanat Kerimbekov (KGZ)	6
Yernur Nurgazy (KAZ)	8
Constantin Chirilov (MDA)	0
Ali Khorramdel (IRI)	9

Quarterfinals
Tigran Ghazaryan (ARM)	0
Magomed-Emi Eltemirov (AIN)	10
Yernur Nurgazy (KAZ)	3
Ali Khorramdel (IRI)	10

Semifinals
Magomed-Emi Eltemirov (AIN)	5
Ali Khorramdel (IRI)	3

=== Repechage ===
Repechage round 1
Muhammad Abdurachmanov (BEL)	6
Eligh Rivera (PUR)	6

Repechage round 2
Eligh Rivera (PUR)	0
Mustafo Akhmedov (TJK)	7
Yoshinosuke Aoyagi (JPN)	9^{F}
Tigran Ghazaryan (ARM)	2

Bronze medals
Mustafo Akhmedov (TJK)	4
Sujeet Kalkal (IND)	13
Yoshinosuke Aoyagi (JPN)	10
Ali Khorramdel (IRI)	0

== Final standing ==
Rank	Athlete
1st place, gold medalist(s)	Magomed Khaniev (AZE)
2nd place, silver medalist(s)	Magomed-Emi Eltemirov (AIN)
3rd place, bronze medalist(s)	Sujeet Kalkal (IND)
3rd place, bronze medalist(s)	Yoshinosuke Aoyagi (JPN)
5	Mustafo Akhmedov (TJK)
5	Ali Khorramdel (IRI)
7	Narek Pohosian (UKR)
8	Yernur Nurgazy (KAZ)
9	Erdenebatyn Tögsjargal (MGL)
10	Constantin Chirilov (MDA)
11	John Wiley (USA)
12	Shehabeldin Mohamed (EGY)
13	Tigran Ghazaryan (ARM)
14	Eligh Rivera (PUR)
15	Kanat Kerimbekov (KGZ)
16	Muhammad Abdurachmanov (BEL)
17	Umut Erdoğan (TUR)
18	Davit Patsinashvili (GEO)
19	Bayin Erihetu (CHN)
20	Mikita Dzemchanka (AIN)
21	Tsz Hei Heung (HKG)
22	Mateusz Łuszczyński (POL)
23	Georgi Zhizgov (BUL)
24	Jorge Gatica (CHI)
—	Egzon Xhoni (KOS)
