= Wrestling at the 2025 Islamic Solidarity Games =

- Host city: Saudi Arabia, Riyadh
- Dates: 18—21 November
- Stadium: Boulevard Arena 01A

Wrestling at the 2025 Islamic Solidarity Games were held in Riyadh, Saudi Arabia from 18 to 21 November 2025. Each National Olympic Committee (NOC) has the right to participate with a maximum of one wrestler per weight category in all styles (Greco-Roman, women and freestyle).

== Medal table ==
* Host nation (Saudi Arabia)

Rank	Nation	Gold	Silver	Bronze	Total
1	Iran	8	1	3	12
2	Kyrgyzstan	4	0	5	9
3	Azerbaijan	2	5	4	11
4	Uzbekistan	2	2	5	9
5	Nigeria	2	2	0	4
6	Turkey	0	2	5	7
7	Kazakhstan	0	2	3	5
8	Bahrain	0	2	1	3
9	Egypt	0	1	1	2
10	Tajikistan	0	1	0	1
11	Algeria	0	0	3	3
12	Iraq	0	0	1	1
12	Pakistan	0	0	1	1
12	Qatar	0	0	1	1
Totals (14 entries)		18	18	33	69

== Medal overview ==
=== Men's freestyle ===
Event	Gold	Silver	Bronze
57 kg	Abdymalik Karachov; Kyrgyzstan	Islam Bazarganov; Azerbaijan	Gulomjon Abdullaev; Uzbekistan
57 kg	Abdymalik Karachov; Kyrgyzstan	Islam Bazarganov; Azerbaijan	Ali Momeni; Iran
65 kg	Rahman Amouzad; Iran	Abdulmazhid Kudiev; Tajikistan	Bilol Sharip Uulu; Kyrgyzstan
65 kg	Rahman Amouzad; Iran	Abdulmazhid Kudiev; Tajikistan	Umidjon Jalolov; Uzbekistan
74 kg	Younes Emami; Iran	Aghanazar Novruzov; Azerbaijan	Magomedrasul Asluev; Bahrain
74 kg	Younes Emami; Iran	Aghanazar Novruzov; Azerbaijan	Orozobek Toktomambetov; Kyrgyzstan
86 kg	Arsenii Dzhioev; Azerbaijan	Khidir Saipudinov; Bahrain	Osman Göçen; Turkey
86 kg	Arsenii Dzhioev; Azerbaijan	Khidir Saipudinov; Bahrain	Kamran Ghasempour; Iran
97 kg	Amir Ali Azarpira; Iran	Rizabek Aitmukhan; Kazakhstan	Muhammad Gulzar; Pakistan
97 kg	Amir Ali Azarpira; Iran	Rizabek Aitmukhan; Kazakhstan	Magomedkhan Magomedov; Azerbaijan
125 kg	Amir Hossein Zare; Iran	Shamil Sharipov; Bahrain	Giorgi Meshvildishvili; Azerbaijan
125 kg	Amir Hossein Zare; Iran	Shamil Sharipov; Bahrain	Hakan Büyükçıngıl; Turkey

=== Men's Greco-Roman ===
Event	Gold	Silver	Bronze
60 kg	Alisher Ganiev; Uzbekistan	Ekrem Öztürk; Turkey	Ali Ahmadi Vafa; Iran
60 kg	Alisher Ganiev; Uzbekistan	Ekrem Öztürk; Turkey	Sajjad Ali; Iraq
67 kg	Saeid Esmaeili; Iran	Hasrat Jafarov; Azerbaijan	Razzak Beishekeev; Kyrgyzstan
67 kg	Saeid Esmaeili; Iran	Hasrat Jafarov; Azerbaijan	Aytjan Khalmakhanov; Uzbekistan
77 kg	Akzhol Makhmudov; Kyrgyzstan	Amir Abdi; Iran	Shahin Badaghi; Qatar
77 kg	Akzhol Makhmudov; Kyrgyzstan	Amir Abdi; Iran	Abdullo Aliev; Uzbekistan
87 kg	Gholamreza Farrokhi; Iran	Islam Yevloyev; Kazakhstan	Bachir Sid Azara; Algeria
87 kg	Gholamreza Farrokhi; Iran	Islam Yevloyev; Kazakhstan	Asan Zhanyshov; Kyrgyzstan
97 kg	Mohammad Hadi Saravi; Iran	Murad Ahmadiyev; Azerbaijan	Beytullah Kayışdağ; Turkey
97 kg	Mohammad Hadi Saravi; Iran	Murad Ahmadiyev; Azerbaijan	Fadi Rouabah; Algeria
130 kg	Fardin Hedayati; Iran	Abdellatif Mohamed; Egypt	Fatih Bozkurt; Turkey

=== Women's freestyle ===
Event	Gold	Silver	Bronze
50 kg	Aktenge Keunimjaeva; Uzbekistan	Mercy Genesis; Nigeria	Elnura Mammadova; Azerbaijan
53 kg	Christianah Ogunsanya; Nigeria	Shokhida Akhmedova; Uzbekistan	Zeinep Bayanova; Kazakhstan
53 kg	Christianah Ogunsanya; Nigeria	Shokhida Akhmedova; Uzbekistan	Aruuke Kadyrbek Kyzy; Kyrgyzstan
57 kg	Zhala Aliyeva; Azerbaijan	Elvira Süleyman Kamaloğlu; Turkey	Achouak Tekouk; Algeria
62 kg	Esther Kolawole; Nigeria	Ruzanna Mammadova; Azerbaijan	Nigina Sabirova; Uzbekistan
62 kg	Esther Kolawole; Nigeria	Ruzanna Mammadova; Azerbaijan	Selvi İlyasoğlu; Turkey
68 kg	Meerim Zhumanazarova; Kyrgyzstan	Svetlana Oknazarova; Uzbekistan	Irina Kazyulina; Kazakhstan
68 kg	Meerim Zhumanazarova; Kyrgyzstan	Svetlana Oknazarova; Uzbekistan	Nigar Mirzazade; Azerbaijan
76 kg	Aiperi Medet Kyzy; Kyrgyzstan	Damola Ojo; Nigeria	Samar Amer; Egypt
76 kg	Aiperi Medet Kyzy; Kyrgyzstan	Damola Ojo; Nigeria	Elmira Syzdykova; Kazakhstan

== Participating nations ==
A total of 173 athletes from 30 nations competed in wrestling at the 2025 Islamic Solidarity Games:

1. Afghanistan (9)
2. Albania (1)
3. Algeria (8)
4. Azerbaijan (18)
5. Bangladesh (2)
6. Bahrain (5)
7. Cameroon (5)
8. Comoros (1)
9. Egypt (13)
10. Guinea-Bissau (1)
11. Guinea (1)
12. Indonesia (3)
13. Iran (12)
14. Iraq (2)
15. Kazakhstan (6)
16. Kyrgyzstan (15)
17. Saudi Arabia (3)
18. Lebanon (1)
19. Morocco (2)
20. Nigeria (4)
21. Pakistan (4)
22. Palestine (2)
23. Sierra Leone (1)
24. Sudan (2)
25. Qatar (2)
26. Tajikistan (8)
27. Tunisia (5)
28. Turkey (18)
29. Uganda (3)
30. Uzbekistan (16)

== Results ==
Legend

- F — Won by fall
- R — Retired
- WO — Won by walkover

=== Men's freestyle ===
==== Men's freestyle 57 kg ====
Round of 16
Aiaal Belolyubskii (TJK)	4
Gulomjon Abdullaev (UZB)	7
Roland Nforsong (CMR)
Islam Bazarganov (AZE)	WO
Yusuf Demir (TUR)	11
Sayed Omar Zazai (AFG)	17^{F}

Quarterfinals
Abdymalik Karachov (KGZ)	10
Gulomjon Abdullaev (UZB)	2
Mohamed Camara (GUI)	10^{F}
Ahmed Siddig Mohamed (SUD)	0
Ali Momeni (IRI)	2
Islam Bazarganov (AZE)	4
Sayed Omar Zazai (AFG)	13
Diamantino Iuna Fafé (GBS)	11

Semifinals
Abdymalik Karachov (KGZ)	2^{F}
Mohamed Camara (GUI)	0
Islam Bazarganov (AZE)	11
Sayed Omar Zazai (AFG)	0

Final
Abdymalik Karachov (KGZ)	9
Islam Bazarganov (AZE)	3

Repechage round
Roland Nforsong (CMR)
Ali Momeni (IRI)	WO

Bronze medal match
Gulomjon Abdullaev (UZB)	10
Mohamed Camara (GUI)	0
Ali Momeni (IRI)	11
Sayed Omar Zazai (AFG)	0

==== Men's freestyle 65 kg ====
Round of 16
Zelimkhan Abakarov (ALB)
Alibeg Alibegov (BRN)	WO
Farouk Jelassi (TUN)	9
Abdulmazhid Kudiev (TJK)	20
Abdullah Assaf (PLE)	0
Bilol Sharip Uulu (KGZ)	10
Najib Hassani (AFG)	0
Rahman Amouzad (IRI)	11
Umidjon Jalolov (UZB)	10
Muhammad Abdullah (PAK)	0
Ali Rahimzade (AZE)	5
Ahmet Duman (TUR)	1

Quarterfinals
Sulaiman Kargbo (SLE)	0
Alibeg Alibegov (BRN)	11
Abdulmazhid Kudiev (TJK)	6
Bilol Sharip Uulu (KGZ)	2
Rahman Amouzad (IRI)	4
Umidjon Jalolov (UZB)	0
Ali Rahimzade (AZE)	10
Said El-Gahsh (EGY)	2

Semifinals
Alibeg Alibegov (BRN)	0
Abdulmazhid Kudiev (TJK)	10
Rahman Amouzad (IRI)	7
Ali Rahimzade (AZE)	0

Final
Abdulmazhid Kudiev (TJK)	2
Rahman Amouzad (IRI)	12

Repechage round
Farouk Jelassi (TUN)	0
Bilol Sharip Uulu (KGZ)	10
Najib Hassani (AFG)	5
Umidjon Jalolov (UZB)	12

Bronze medal match
Bilol Sharip Uulu (KGZ)	10
Alibeg Alibegov (BRN)	0
Umidjon Jalolov (UZB)	8
Ali Rahimzade (AZE)	3

==== Men's freestyle 74 kg ====
Round of 16
Aghanazar Novruzov (AZE)	6
Fazlı Eryılmaz (TUR)	3
Omar Mourad (EGY)	5
Shams Quraishi (AFG)	10^{F}
Magomedrasul Asluev (BRN)	8
Inayat Ullah (PAK)	1
Nurkozha Kaipanov (KAZ)	11
Jafar Chuliboyev (UZB)	0
Orozobek Toktomambetov (KGZ)	11
Khairiddine Ben Tlili (TUN)	1

Quarterfinals
Rogers Mukyeda (UGA)	0
Aghanazar Novruzov (AZE)	10
Shams Quraishi (AFG)	9
Magomedrasul Asluev (BRN)	12
Jacques Monty Mbougou (CMR)	0
Nurkozha Kaipanov (KAZ)	10
Orozobek Toktomambetov (KGZ)	2
Younes Emami (IRI)	5

Semifinals
Aghanazar Novruzov (AZE)	7
Magomedrasul Asluev (BRN)	5
Nurkozha Kaipanov (KAZ)	5
Younes Emami (IRI)	6

Final
Aghanazar Novruzov (AZE)	0
Younes Emami (IRI)	5

Repechage round
Fazlı Eryılmaz (TUR)	10
Rogers Mukyeda (UGA)	0

Bronze medal match
Fazlı Eryılmaz (TUR)	3
Magomedrasul Asluev (BRN)	4
Orozobek Toktomambetov (KGZ)	4
Nurkozha Kaipanov (KAZ)	2

==== Men's freestyle 86 kg ====
Round of 16
Khidir Saipudinov (BRN)	12
Bekzat Rakhimov (KGZ)	6
Osman Göçen (TUR)	2
Bobur Islomov (UZB)	2
Farhad Malik Zada (AFG)	8
Haider Ali Butt (PAK)	4
Kamran Ghasempour (IRI)	3
Arsenii Dzhioev (AZE)	5

Quarterfinals
Ahmed Khaled Mahmoud (EGY)	0
Khidir Saipudinov (BRN)	10
Osman Göçen (TUR)	13
Ibrahim Mohamed Ahmed (SUD)	0
Magomet Evloev (TJK)	10
Farhad Malik Zada (AFG)	0
Arsenii Dzhioev (AZE)	11
Fateh Benferdjallah (ALG)	0

Semifinals
Khidir Saipudinov (BRN)	8
Osman Göçen (TUR)	6
Magomet Evloev (TJK)	1
Arsenii Dzhioev (AZE)	5

Final
Khidir Saipudinov (BRN)	1
Arsenii Dzhioev (AZE)	5

Repechage round
Bekzat Rakhimov (KGZ)	12
Ahmed Khaled Mahmoud (EGY)	1
Kamran Ghasempour (IRI)	11
Fateh Benferdjallah (ALG)	0

Bronze medal match
Bekzat Rakhimov (KGZ)	2
Osman Göçen (TUR)	10
Kamran Ghasempour (IRI)	8
Magomet Evloev (TJK)	0

==== Men's freestyle 97 kg ====
Round of 16
Rıfat Gıdak (TUR)	5
Doolotbek Zhamgyrbek Uulu (KGZ)	2
Iqbal Ahmadi (AFG)	0
Amir Ali Azarpira (IRN)	11
Mohamed Salaheldin (EGY)	0
Rizabek Aitmukhan (KAZ)	10
Sherzod Poyonov (UZB)	1
Akhmed Tazhudinov (BRN)	11

Quarterfinals
Houssem Oucif (ALG)	2
Rıfat Gıdak (TUR)	13
Amir Ali Azarpira (IRI)	11
Muhammad Gulzar (PAK)	0
Magomedkhan Magomedov (AZE)	2
Rizabek Aitmukhan (KAZ)	12
Akhmed Tazhudinov (BRN)	8^{F}
Cédric Abossolo (CMR)	0

Semifinals
Rıfat Gıdak (TUR)	0
Amir Ali Azarpira (IRI)	11
Rizabek Aitmukhan (KAZ)	15
Akhmed Tazhudinov (BRN)	3

Final
Amir Ali Azarpira (IRI)	5
Rizabek Aitmukhan (KAZ)	0

Repechage round
Iqbal Ahmadi (AFG)
Muhammad Gulzar (PAK)	WO
Mohamed Salaheldin (EGY)	6
Magomedkhan Magomedov (AZE)	18

Bronze medal match
Muhammad Gulzar (PAK)	4^{F}
Rıfat Gıdak (TUR)	5
Magomedkhan Magomedov (AZE)	WO
Akhmed Tazhudinov (BRN)

==== Men's freestyle 125 kg ====
Quarterfinals		Semifinals		Final
Abdelrahman Sheyatan (EGY)	0
Shamil Sharipov (BRN)	10	Shamil Sharipov (BRN)	7
Khasanboy Rakhimov (UZB)	5^{R}	Giorgi Meshvildishvili (AZE)	6
Giorgi Meshvildishvili (AZE)	7			Shamil Sharipov (BRN)	0
Amir Hossein Zare (IRI)	11			Amir Hossein Zare (IRI)	10
Arslanbek Turdubekov (KGZ)	0	Amir Hossein Zare (IRI)	7
Hakan Büyükçıngıl (TUR)	11	Hakan Büyükçıngıl (TUR)	0
Oussama Assad (MAR)	0

Bronze medals
Abdelrahman Sheyatan (EGY)	0
Giorgi Meshvildishvili (AZE)	5
Arslanbek Turdubekov (KGZ)	3
Hakan Büyükçıngıl (TUR)	14

=== Men's Greco-Roman ===
==== Men's Greco-Roman 60 kg ====
Round of 16
Nihat Mammadli (AZE)	11^{F}
Latuf Madi (COM)	0
Adham Ayman El-Sayed (EGY)	2
Sajjad Ali (IRQ)	4
Abdelkarim Fergat (ALG)	5
Akyl Sulaimanov (KGZ)	3

Quarterfinals
Alisher Ganiev (UZB)	3
Nihat Mammadli (AZE)	0
Ali Ahmadi Vafa (IRI)	10
Aslamjon Azizov (TJK)	4
Ekrem Öztürk (TUR)	9
Sajjad Ali (IRQ)	0
Abdelkarim Fergat (ALG)	10
Hamidullah Besmellah (AFG)	0

Semifinals
Alisher Ganiev (UZB)	8
Ali Ahmadi Vafa (IRI)	0
Ekrem Öztürk (TUR)	6
Abdelkarim Fergat (ALG)	4

Final
Alisher Ganiev (UZB)	8
Ekrem Öztürk (TUR)	0

Bronze medals
Nihat Mammadli (AZE)	2
Ali Ahmadi Vafa (IRI)	3
Sajjad Ali (IRQ)	5
Abdelkarim Fergat (ALG)	1

==== Men's Greco-Roman 67 kg ====
Round of 16
Hasrat Jafarov (AZE)	9
Mohammad Aslam Zade (AFG)	0
Aref Mohammadi (QAT)	8
Munthir Jandu (KSA)	1

Quarterfinals
Razzak Beishekeev (KGZ)	3
Hasrat Jafarov (AZE)	5
Mohamed Abdelrehim (EGY)	6
Sunat Abdulloev (TJK)	3
Aytjan Khalmakhanov (UZB)	5
Mustafa Safa Yıldırım (TUR)	2
Aref Mohammadi (QAT)	0
Saeid Esmaeili (IRI)	8

Semifinals
Hasrat Jafarov (AZE)	4
Mohamed Abdelrehim (EGY)	1
Aytjan Khalmakhanov (UZB)	0
Saeid Esmaeili (IRI)	9

Final
Hasrat Jafarov (AZE)	3
Saeid Esmaeili (IRI)	8

Repechage round
Mohammad Aslam Zade (AFG)	0
Razzak Beishekeev (KGZ)	8

Bronze medal match
Razzak Beishekeev (KGZ)	9^{F}
Mohamed Abdelrehim (EGY)	0
Aref Mohammadi (QAT)	2
Aytjan Khalmakhanov (UZB)	5

==== Men's Greco-Roman 77 kg ====
Round of 16
Akzhol Makhmudov (KGZ)	9
Sami Slama (TUN)	0
Ulvu Ganizade (AZE)	0
Amir Abdi (IRI)	9
Hassan Barnawi (KSA)	0
Abdullo Aliev (UZB)	5

Quarterfinals
Yehia Abdelkader (EGY)	0
Akzhol Makhmudov (KGZ)	9
Yunus Emre Başar (TUR)	1
Shahin Badaghi (QAT)	4
Habibjon Zuhurov (TJK)	0
Amir Abdi (IRI)	8
Abdullo Aliev (UZB)	11
Gul Khan Noori (AFG)	0

Semifinals
Akzhol Makhmudov (KGZ)	5
Shahin Badaghi (QAT)	3
Amir Abdi (IRI)	6
Abdullo Aliev (UZB)	0

Final
Akzhol Makhmudov (KGZ)	6^{F}
Amir Abdi (IRI)	1

Repechage round
Sami Slama (TUN)	3
Yehia Abdelkader (EGY)	2
Ulvu Ganizade (AZE)	5
Habibjon Zuhurov (TJK)	3

Bronze medal match
Sami Slama (TUN)	1
Shahin Badaghi (QAT)	8^{F}
Ulvu Ganizade (AZE)	2
Abdullo Aliev (UZB)	2

==== Men's Greco-Roman 87 kg ====
Round of 16
Bachir Sid Azara (ALG)	8
Mohamad Awarke (LBN)	0
Asan Zhanyshov (KGZ)	1
Jalgasbay Berdimuratov (UZB)	1

Quarterfinals
Noureldin Hassan (EGY)	4
Bachir Sid Azara (ALG)	5
Islam Yevloyev (KAZ)	8
Sukhrob Abdulkhaev (TJK)	0
Gholamreza Farrokhi (IRI)	3
Islam Abbasov (AZE)	0
Asan Zhanyshov (KGZ)	9
Doğan Kaya (TUR)	1

Semifinals
Bachir Sid Azara (ALG)	0
Islam Yevloyev (KAZ)	5
Gholamreza Farrokhi (IRI)	7
Asan Zhanyshov (KGZ)	6

Final
Islam Yevloyev (KAZ)	0
Gholamreza Farrokhi (IRI)	6

Bronze medals
Sukhrob Abdulkhaev (TJK)	1
Bachir Sid Azara (ALG)	5
Islam Abbasov (AZE)	0
Asan Zhanyshov (KGZ)	9

==== Men's Greco-Roman 97 kg ====
Quarterfinals		Semifinals		Final
Murad Ahmadiyev (AZE)	8
Mohamed Ali Gabr (EGY)	0	Murad Ahmadiyev (AZE)	5
Abdikodir Jalilov (UZB)	0	Beytullah Kayışdağ (TUR)	1
Beytullah Kayışdağ (TUR)	10			Murad Ahmadiyev (AZE)	1
Fadi Rouabah (ALG)	1			Mohammad Hadi Saravi (IRI)	5
Mohammad Hadi Saravi (IRI)	7	Mohammad Hadi Saravi (IRI)	9
Ibrahim Fallatah (KSA)	8	Ibrahim Fallatah (KSA)	0
Sayed Jawad Asghari (AFG)	0

Bronze medals
Mohamed Ali Gabr (EGY)	1
Beytullah Kayışdağ (TUR)	3
Fadi Rouabah (ALG)	8
Ibrahim Fallatah (KSA)	0

==== Men's Greco-Roman 130 kg ====
19 November

Pos	Athlete	Pld	W	L	CP	TP	IRI	EGY	AZE
1	Fardin Hedayati (IRI)	2	2	0	7	11	—	3–0	8–0
2	Abdellatif Mohamed (EGY)	2	1	1	3	4	0–3 PO	—	4–3
3	Beka Kandelaki (AZE)	2	0	2	1	3	0–4 SU	1–3 PO1	—

Source: UWW

Pos	Athlete	Pld	W	L	CP	TP	TUR	KGZ	IRQ
1	Fatih Bozkurt (TUR)	2	2	0	8	18	—	9–0	9–0
2	Roman Kim (KGZ)	2	1	1	3	4	0–4 SU	—	4–1
3	Ali Yaseen (IRQ)	2	0	2	1	1	0–4 SU	1–3 PO1	—

Source: UWW

Semifinals
Fardin Hedayati (IRI)	9
Roman Kim (KGZ)	0
Fatih Bozkurt (TUR)	0
Abdellatif Mohamed (EGY)	3

Final
Fardin Hedayati (IRI)	9^{F}
Abdellatif Mohamed (EGY)	0
Bronze medal
Roman Kim (KGZ)	2
Fatih Bozkurt (TUR)	11

=== Women's freestyle ===
==== Women's freestyle 50 kg ====
19 November

Pos	Athlete	Pld	W	L	CP	TP	UZB	ALG	TUN
1	Aktenge Keunimjaeva (UZB)	2	2	0	9	16	—	6–1 Fall	10–0
2	Cheima Chebila (ALG)	2	1	1	3	6	0–5 FA	—	5–1
3	Chahrazed Ayachi (TUN)	2	0	2	1	1	0–4 SU	1–3 PO1	—

Source: UWW

Pos	Athlete	Pld	W	L	CP	TP	NGR	AZE	TUR
1	Mercy Genesis (NGR)	2	2	0	7	18	—	12–2	6–1
2	Elnura Mammadova (AZE)	2	1	1	4	10	1–4 SU1	—	8–5
3	Zehra Demirhan (TUR)	2	0	2	2	6	1–3 PO1	1–3 PO1	—

Source: UWW

Semifinals
Aktenge Keunimjaeva (UZB)	10
Elnura Mammadova (AZE)	0
Mercy Genesis (NGR)	8^{F}
Cheima Chebila (ALG)	0

Final
Aktenge Keunimjaeva (UZB)	5
Mercy Genesis (NGR)	1
Bronze medal
Elnura Mammadova (AZE)	5
Cheima Chebila (ALG)	0

==== Women's freestyle 53 kg ====
Round of 16
Zeynep Yetgil (TUR)	5
Fatma-Zohra Bouchibi (ALG)	0

Quarterfinals
Zeinep Bayanova (KAZ)	11
Zeynep Yetgil (TUR)	8
Christianah Ogunsanya (NGR)	11
Vatansulton Shakarshoeva (TJK)	8
Aruuke Kadyrbek Kyzy (KGZ)	11^{F}
Gultakin Shirinova (AZE)	4
Shokhida Akhmedova (UZB)	4^{F}
Yusma Deswita (INA)	0

Semifinals
Zeinep Bayanova (KAZ)	0
Christianah Ogunsanya (NGR)	10
Aruuke Kadyrbek Kyzy (KGZ)	3
Shokhida Akhmedova (UZB)	5

Final
Christianah Ogunsanya (NGR)	11
Shokhida Akhmedova (UZB)	1

Bronze medals
Vatansulton Shakarshoeva (TJK)	3
Zeinep Bayanova (KAZ)	14
Yusma Deswita (INA)	0
Aruuke Kadyrbek Kyzy (KGZ)	3^{F}

==== Women's freestyle 57 kg ====
19 November

Pos	Athlete	Pld	W	L	CP	TP	AZE	TUR	TUN	BAN
1	Zhala Aliyeva (AZE)	3	3	0	13	36	—	19–10	9–2 Fall	8–0 Fall
2	Elvira Süleyman Kamaloğlu (TUR)	3	2	1	8	25	1–3 PO1	—	5–3	10–0
3	Chahed Jeljeli (TUN)	3	1	2	5	20	0–5 FA	1–3 PO1	—	15–4
4	Mim (BAN)	3	0	3	1	4	0–5 FA	0–4 SU	1–4 SU1	—

Source: UWW

Pos	Athlete	Pld	W	L	CP	TP	ALG	KGZ	UGA
1	Achouak Tekouk (ALG)	2	2	0	8	8	—	4–2	4–0 Fall
2	Sezim Zhumanazarova (KGZ)	2	1	1	5	12	1–3 PO1	—	10–0
3	Veronica Ayo (UGA)	2	0	2	0	0	0–5 FA	0–4 SU	—

Source: UWW

Semifinals
Zhala Aliyeva (AZE)	4^{F}
Sezim Zhumanazarova (KGZ)	2
Achouak Tekouk (ALG)	6
Elvira Süleyman Kamaloğlu (TUR)	10

Final
Zhala Aliyeva (AZE)	6
Elvira Süleyman Kamaloğlu (TUR)	2
Bronze medal
Sezim Zhumanazarova (KGZ)	3
Achouak Tekouk (ALG)	14^{F}

==== Women's freestyle 62 kg ====
Quarterfinals		Semifinals		Final
Nigina Sabirova (UZB)	10
Mawadda Hamdun (EGY)	0	Nigina Sabirova (UZB)	0
Ruzanna Mammadova (AZE)	10	Ruzanna Mammadova (AZE)	6
Aylah Mayali (PLE)	0			Ruzanna Mammadova (AZE)	4
Rebecca Amongi (UGA)	0			Esther Kolawole (NGR)	6
Esther Kolawole (NGR)	10	Esther Kolawole (NGR)	10
Selvi İlyasoğlu (TUR)	10^{F}	Selvi İlyasoğlu (TUR)	0
Zineb Hassoune (MAR)	0

Bronze medals
Aylah Mayali (PLE)	0
Nigina Sabirova (UZB)	11
Rebecca Amongi (UGA)	0
Selvi İlyasoğlu (TUR)	2^{F}

==== Women's freestyle 68 kg ====
Quarterfinals		Semifinals		Final
Svetlana Oknazarova (UZB)	2^{F}
Aimelda Ndiffo (CMR)	0	Svetlana Oknazarova (UZB)	4^{F}
Irina Kazyulina (KAZ)	2^{F}	Irina Kazyulina (KAZ)	4
Nesrin Baş (TUR)	2			Svetlana Oknazarova (UZB)	0
Halima Akter (BAN)	0			Meerim Zhumanazarova (KGZ)	11
Meerim Zhumanazarova (KGZ)	6^{F}	Meerim Zhumanazarova (KGZ)	12
Nigar Mirzazade (AZE)	12	Nigar Mirzazade (AZE)	1
Desi Sinta (INA)	7

Bronze medals
Aimelda Ndiffo (CMR)	0
Irina Kazyulina (KAZ)	6^{F}
Halima Akter (BAN)
Nigar Mirzazade (AZE)	WO

==== Women's freestyle 76 kg ====
Round of 16
Sevinchoy Polvonova (UZB)	0
Zahra Kerimzade (AZE)	5

Quarterfinals
Pélagie Wilita (CMR)	10
Zahra Kerimzade (AZE)	0
Samar Amer (EGY)	2
Damola Ojo (NGR)	8
Varadisa Hidayat (INA)	2
Elmira Yasin (TUR)	5
Elmira Syzdykova (KAZ)	0
Aiperi Medet Kyzy (KGZ)	10

Semifinals
Pélagie Wilita (CMR)	0
Damola Ojo (NGR)	10
Elmira Yasin (TUR)	0
Aiperi Medet Kyzy (KGZ)	5^{F}

Final
Damola Ojo (NGR)	1
Aiperi Medet Kyzy (KGZ)	11

Bronze medals
Samar Amer (EGY)	5
Pélagie Wilita (CMR)	1
Elmira Syzdykova (KAZ)	7^{F}
Elmira Yasin (TUR)	0
