= Wrestling at the 2024 Summer Olympics – Men's freestyle 65 kg =

Men's freestyle 65 kg at the Games of the XXXIII Olympiad
- Venue: Grand Palais Éphémère
- Date: 10–11 August 2024
- Competitors: 16 from 16 nations

Medalists
1st place, gold medalist(s)		Kotaro Kiyooka	Japan
2nd place, silver medalist(s)		Rahman Amouzad	Iran
3rd place, bronze medalist(s)		Sebastian Rivera	Puerto Rico
3rd place, bronze medalist(s)		Islam Dudaev	Albania

Men's freestyle 65 kilograms competition at the 2024 Summer Olympics in Paris, France, took place on 10–11 August 2024 at the Grand Palais Éphémère in Champ de Mars.

== Background ==
This is the 26th appearance of men's freestyle lightweight event, the event debut as a demonstration in 1908 and it has been appeared in every games since then, except 1912.

- 1908: 66.6kg
- 1920: 61 kg
- 1924: 66kg
- 1928: 65kg
- 1932-1936: 66kg
- 1948-1960: 67kg
- 1964-1968: 70kg
- 1972-1996: 68kg
- 2000: 69kg
- 2004-2012: 66kg
- 2016-current: 65kg

Kotaro Kiyooka won the event and became a champion by defeating Rahman Amouzad in the final, Sebastian Rivera and Islam Dudaev won bronze medals with both Rivera and Dudaev going through repechages.

== Format ==
This freestyle wrestling competition consists of a single-elimination tournament, with a repechage used to determine the winner of two bronze medals. The two finalists face off for gold and silver medals. Each wrestler who loses to one of the two finalists moves into the repechage, culminating in a pair of bronze medal matches featuring the semifinal losers each facing the remaining repechage opponent from their half of the bracket.

== Rules ==
A typical bout consists of two halves of three minutes each separated by a 30-second break. The two competitors compete on a mat, which is nine meters in diameter. Wrestlers try to score points by executing various legal maneuvers. Points ranging from one to five are awarded by the mat referee depending on the degree of difficulty of the maneuvers. Points are also awarded to the opponent in case of infractions such as illegal holds, passivity etc. A wrestler is automatically disqualified if three cautions are awarded during a bout. Forcing an opponent's shoulders to the mat results in an instant victory by fall.

During the course of a match, if a wrestler builds a 10-point advantage over the opponent, the bout is stopped and the leader is declared as the winner by technical superiority. The total scores are totaled at the end of the stipulated six-minute period, and the wrestler with the maximum points wins. In case of a tie, the wrestler who has scored the last point is declared the winner. A competitor might also be declared a winner if the opponent does not turn up or is medically unfit to compete.

== Qualification ==
Sixteen quota places were available with each nation restricted to a maximum of one spot. Five quota places were awarded at the 2023 World Wrestling Championships, which took place from the 16th to 24th of September in Belgrade, Serbia. The finalists of each category in the four continental qualification tournaments (Asia, Europe, the Americas, and the joint Africa & Oceania) were awarded quota places. The remainder of the total quota was allocated at the 2024 World Wrestling Olympic Qualification Tournament, offering a minimum of three quota places.

== Schedule ==
All times are Central European Time (UTC+02:00)

Date	Time	Event
10 August 2024	11:30	Qualification rounds
10 August 2024	18:15	Semifinals
11 August 2024	11:00	Repechage
11 August 2024	12:30	Finals

== Results ==
Sixteen athletes qualified for the competition.

Legend

- F — Won by fall
- WO — Won by walkover

=== Main bracket ===
Round of 16
Vazgen Tevanyan (ARM)	11
Goderdzi Dzebisashvili (GEO)	0
Alejandro Valdés (CUB)	0
Tömör-Ochiryn Tulga (MGL)	5
Maxim Saculțan (MDA)	0
Kotaro Kiyooka (JPN)	10
Georgii Okorokov (AUS)	2
Sebastian Rivera (PUR)	12
Ismail Musukaev (HUN)	11
Ernazar Akmataliev (KGZ)	0
Austin Gomez (MEX)	0
Haji Aliyev (AZE)	7
Islam Dudaev (ALB)	10
Gaku Akazawa (SAM)	0
Zain Retherford (USA)	0
Rahman Amouzad (IRI)	8

Quarterfinals
Vazgen Tevanyan (ARM)	5
Tömör-Ochiryn Tulga (MGL)	7
Kotaro Kiyooka (JPN)	8
Sebastian Rivera (PUR)	6
Ismail Musukaev (HUN)	10
Haji Aliyev (AZE)	3
Islam Dudaev (ALB)	0
Rahman Amouzad (IRI)	11

Semifinals
Tömör-Ochiryn Tulga (MGL)	1
Kotaro Kiyooka (JPN)	5
Ismail Musukaev (HUN)	0
Rahman Amouzad (IRI)	10

Final
Kotaro Kiyooka (JPN)	10
Rahman Amouzad (IRI)	3

=== Repechage ===
Repechage
Maxim Saculțan (MDA)	4
Sebastian Rivera (PUR)	15
Zain Retherford (USA)
Islam Dudaev (ALB)	WO

Bronze medal matches
Sebastian Rivera (PUR)	10
Tömör-Ochiryn Tulga (MGL)	9
Islam Dudaev (ALB)	13
Ismail Musukaev (HUN)	12

== Final standing ==
Rank	Athlete
1st place, gold medalist(s)	Kotaro Kiyooka (JPN)
2nd place, silver medalist(s)	Rahman Amouzad (IRI)
3rd place, bronze medalist(s)	Sebastian Rivera (PUR)
3rd place, bronze medalist(s)	Islam Dudaev (ALB)
5	Tömör-Ochiryn Tulga (MGL)
5	Ismail Musukaev (HUN)
7	Vazgen Tevanyan (ARM)
8	Haji Aliyev (AZE)
9	Maxim Saculțan (MDA)
10	Georgii Okorokov (AUS)
11	Alejandro Valdés (CUB)
12	Austin Gomez (MEX)
13	Zain Retherford (USA)
14	Gaku Akazawa (SAM)
15	Goderdzi Dzebisashvili (GEO)
16	Ernazar Akmataliev (KGZ)
