= Tömör-Ochiryn Tulga =

Mongolian wrestler (born 1998)

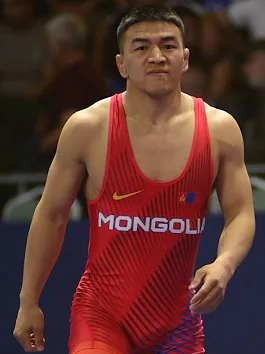
- Tömör-Ochiryn Tulga at the 2024 Khadartsev Brothers Memorial Tournament

Personal information
- Native name: Төмөр-Очирын Тулга
- Nationality: Mongolia
- Born: 11 February 1998 (age 28) Mankhan, Mongolia
- Height: 1.68 m (5 ft 6 in)

Sport
- Country: Mongolia
- Sport: Wrestling
- Weight class: 70 kg
- Rank: Merited Athlete of Mongolia
- Event: Freestyle
- Club: Haryana Thunders (PWL)

Achievements and titles
- Olympic finals: 5th (2024)
- World finals: (silver) (2025)
- Regional finals: (gold) (2023)
- National finals: (gold) (2019) (gold) (2023)
Medal record
Men's freestyle wrestling
Representing Mongolia
World Championships
Silver medal – second place	2025 Zagreb	70 kg
Bronze medal – third place	2021 Oslo	65 kg
Bronze medal – third place	2026 Astana	70 kg
Asian Games
Gold medal – first place	2022 Hangzhou	65 kg
Asian Championships
Silver medal – second place	2023 Astana	65 kg
Silver medal – second place	2024 Bishkek	65 kg
Silver medal – second place	2026 Bishkek	70 kg
Olympic Qualification Tournament
Gold medal – first place	2024 Istanbul	65 kg
Yasar Dogu Tournament
Silver medal – second place	2024 Antalya	70 kg
Golden Grand Prix Ivan Yarygin
Silver medal – second place	2024 Krasnoyarsk	65 kg
Grand Prix
Gold medal – first place	2018 Tabriz	65 kg
Gold medal – first place	2022 Almaty	65 kg
Gold medal – first place	2023 Zagreb	65 kg
Gold medal – first place	2023 Bishkek	65 kg
Gold medal – first place	2023 Budapest	65 kg
Gold medal – first place	2026 Ulaanbaatar	70 kg
Silver medal – second place	2021 Rome	65 kg
Bronze medal – third place	2025 Ulaanbaatar	70 kg
U23 Asian Championship
Gold medal – first place	2019 Ulaanbaatar	65 kg
Asian Cadets Championship
Gold medal – first place	2015 New Delhi	58 kg

Tömör-Ochiryn Tulga (Mongolian: Төмөр-Очирын Тулга; born 11 February 1998), also known as Tulga Tumur-Ochir, is a Mongolian freestyle wrestler. He is currently signed to Real American Freestyle, and the Haryana Thunders of Pro Wrestling League.

He competes at 65 kg and is a former winner of the Asian U23 Wrestling Championship (2019), Asian Games (2022), and PWL Championship (2026). Additionally, he competed in the 2020 Summer Olympics and 2024 Summer Olympics.

== Freestyle career ==
Tulga took silver in the 65 kg division of 2018 Dmitri Korkin Tournament, defeating Olympic champion Rei Higuchi by technical fall in quarterfinals.

Tulga won gold in the 65 kg finals of the 2019 Asian U23 Wrestling Championship, defeating Amir Mohammad Yazdani by pinfall.

He lost his opening 65 kg match of the 2020 Summer Olympics to Takuto Otoguro, then failed to place after losing in repechage to Ismail Musukaev.

Tulga took silver in the 65 kg division of Matteo Pellicone Ranking Series 2021, losing in the finals to Bajrang Punia.

He won bronze in the 65 kg division of the 2021 World Wrestling Championships, winning against Kaiki Yamaguchi 3–2, Vazgen Tevanyan 2–1, losing by decision with a score of 4–4 to eventual World Champion Zagir Shakhiev before defeating Rohit Kumar by fall.

At the 2022 World Cup he earned 5th place in the 65 kg event, with wins over current World Championships runner-up and NCAA Champion Yianni Diakomihalis (10–3), 2019 World Champion Beka Lomtadze (11–0), and leaving the tournament undefeated in the individual standings.

Tulga beat reigning Russian National Champion Ibragim Ibragimov 2–1 at the PWL-3 World Series which was held 20 December 2022 in Bishkek, Kyrgyzstan.

Tulga won gold in the 65 kg finals of the 2022 Asian Games, defeating 2022 World Champion Rahman Amouzad by technical fall.

Tulga received silver in the 65 kg division of the 2024 Golden Grand Prix Ivan Yarygin, winning against 2021 World Champion Zagir Shakhiev 8–0 in the semifinals, and losing to Gadzhimurad Rashidov by decision in the final, despite a protest from Tulga's corner.

He qualified for the Olympics by sweeping the 2024 World Wrestling Olympic Qualification Tournament at 65 kg, with wins over Alibeg Alibegov (10–0), reigning World Champion Zain Retherford (7–2), Abdulmazhid Kudiev (9–0), and Sujeet Kalkal (6–1).

Tulga lost the 65 kg bronze medal match of the 2024 Summer Olympics to Sebastian Rivera by 9–10.

The Haryana Thunders claimed Tulga at auction for the 2026 Pro Wrestling League season at a cost of ₹18 lakh (US$19,000).

Tulga won the Pro Wrestling League championship for the 2026 season with the Haryana Thunders, although he lost his 65 kg finals bout to Sujeet Kalkal of the Delhi Dangal Warriors.

He took silver in the 70 kg division of the 2026 Asian Wrestling Championships, losing in the finals to Abhimanyou Mandwal.

Tulga was scheduled to debut for Real American Freestyle at RAF 09 on 30 May 2026 against Zain Retherford. However, Tulga withdrew and was replaced by Antrell Taylor.
