= Pro Wrestling League =

Professional wrestling league in India

- Current season, competition or edition: 2026 Pro Wrestling League
- Sport: Wrestling
- First season: 2015
- Administrator: Wrestling Federation of India
- No. of teams: 6
- Country: India
- Most recent champion: Haryana Thunders (2026)
- Most titles: Punjab Royals (2 titles)
- Broadcaster: Sony Sports Network
- Streaming partner: Sony LIV
- Website: www.thepwlindia.com

The Pro Wrestling League (PWL) is a wrestling league based in India. It was launched in 2015 by the Wrestling Federation of India.

Despite its name, the league features competitive wrestling in the freestyle discipline rather than entertainment-oriented "professional wrestling".

== Format ==
The Pro Wrestling League includes six franchises, which represent cities throughout India. The teams are formed via auction.

The league adheres to United World Wrestling rules for all weight categories. All the seasons so far of PWL hosted six teams, each consisting of 9 players. During the group stage all the team meet each other once. While the top after group stages qualifies to the playoffs. During group stages out of 9 weight categories 7 category bouts are held, the teams gets to block any one category bouts they want, they have to play all bouts even if they win the match before the last bout. During the playoffs all the 9 category bouts are held and a team wins a match when it wins 5 bouts.

In every season of PWL, all players participate in a bidding system. Players are listed in an auction where each team owner bags a chosen player after making the highest bid.

== Teams ==
Team
Delhi Dangal Warriors
Haryana Thunders
Maharashtra Kesari
Punjab Royals
Tiigers of Mumbai Dangals
UP Dominators

== Editions and results ==
Year	Winners
2015	Mumbai Garuda
2017	NCR Punjab Royals
2018	NCR Punjab Royals
2019	Haryana Hammers
2026	Haryana Thunders
2027

== See also ==
- Sports in India
- Pro Panja League
