= Wrestling at the 2022 Asian Games – Men's freestyle 65 kg =

Men's freestyle 65 kg at the 2022 Asian Games
- Venue: Lin'an Sports and Culture Centre
- Date: 6 October 2023
- Competitors: 18 from 18 nations

Medalists
gold medal	Tömör-Ochiryn Tulga	Mongolia
silver medal	Rahman Amouzad	Iran
bronze medal	Kim Kwang-jin	North Korea
bronze medal	Kaiki Yamaguchi	Japan

The men's freestyle 65 kilograms wrestling competition at the 2022 Asian Games in Hangzhou was held on 6 October 2023 at the Lin'an Sports and Culture Centre.

== Schedule ==
All times are China Standard Time (UTC+08:00)

Date	Time	Event
Friday, 6 October 2023	10:00	Qualifications
Friday, 6 October 2023	10:00	1/8 finals
Friday, 6 October 2023	10:00	1/4 finals
Friday, 6 October 2023	10:00	Semifinals
Friday, 6 October 2023	10:00	Repechages
Friday, 6 October 2023	17:00	Finals

== Results ==
Legend

- F — Won by fall

=== Main bracket ===
==== Final ====
Gold medal match
Tömör-Ochiryn Tulga (MGL)	11
Rahman Amouzad (IRI)	1

==== Top half ====
Qualifications
Sanzhar Mukhtar (KAZ)	0
Tömör-Ochiryn Tulga (MGL)	10

1/8 finals
Kim Chang-su (KOR)	11
Siripong Jumpakam (THA)	0
Tömör-Ochiryn Tulga (MGL)	10
Yon Bunna (CAM)	0
Abdulmazhid Kudiev (TJK)	11
Alibek Osmonov (KGZ)	0
Ibrahim Guzan (YEM)	0
Kim Kwang-jin (PRK)	10

1/4 finals
Kim Chang-su (KOR)	0
Tömör-Ochiryn Tulga (MGL)	10
Abdulmazhid Kudiev (TJK)	2
Kim Kwang-jin (PRK)	4

Semifinals
Tömör-Ochiryn Tulga (MGL)	11^{F}
Kim Kwang-jin (PRK)	0

==== Bottom half ====
Qualifications
Rahman Amouzad (IRI)	12
Abbos Rakhmonov (UZB)	6

1/8 finals
Ronil Tubog (PHI)	0
Bajrang Punia (IND)	10
Abdullah Assaf (PLE)	3
Alibeg Alibegov (BRN)	5
Kaiki Yamaguchi (JPN)	1
Rahman Amouzad (IRI)	2
Wei Baowen (CHN)	11
Mashal Sadeqi (AFG)	0

1/4 finals
Bajrang Punia (IND)	4
Alibeg Alibegov (BRN)	0
Rahman Amouzad (IRI)	6
Wei Baowen (CHN)	0

Semifinals
Bajrang Punia (IND)	1
Rahman Amouzad (IRI)	8

=== Repechage ===
Repechage round 1
Sanzhar Mukhtar (KAZ)	11
Yon Bunna (CAM)	0
Abbos Rakhmonov (UZB)	0
Kaiki Yamaguchi (JPN)	10

Repechage round 2
Sanzhar Mukhtar (KAZ)	2
Kim Chang-su (KOR)	1
Kaiki Yamaguchi (JPN)	6
Wei Baowen (CHN)	1

Bronze medal matches
Sanzhar Mukhtar (KAZ)	6
Kim Kwang-jin (PRK)	11
Kaiki Yamaguchi (JPN)	10
Bajrang Punia (IND)	0

== Final standing ==
Rank	Athlete
1st place, gold medalist(s)	Tömör-Ochiryn Tulga (MGL)
2nd place, silver medalist(s)	Rahman Amouzad (IRI)
3rd place, bronze medalist(s)	Kim Kwang-jin (PRK)
3rd place, bronze medalist(s)	Kaiki Yamaguchi (JPN)
5	Sanzhar Mukhtar (KAZ)
5	Bajrang Punia (IND)
7	Abdulmazhid Kudiev (TJK)
8	Kim Chang-su (KOR)
9	Wei Baowen (CHN)
10	Alibeg Alibegov (BRN)
11	Abbos Rakhmonov (UZB)
12	Abdullah Assaf (PLE)
13	Ibrahim Guzan (YEM)
14	Ronil Tubog (PHI)
15	Siripong Jumpakam (THA)
16	Alibek Osmonov (KGZ)
17	Mashal Sadeqi (AFG)
18	Yon Bunna (CAM)
