= Peiman Biabani =

Iranian wrestler (born 1996)

Personal information
- Native name: پیمان بیابانی
- Full name: Peiman Biabani
- Nationality: Iran
- Born: 4 November 1996 (age 29) Tehran, Iran
- Height: 172 cm (5 ft 8 in)

Sport
- Country: Iran (2016-2019); Canada (2025-)
- Sport: Wrestling
- Weight class: 65 kg
- Event: Freestyle
Medal record
Men's freestyle wrestling
Representing Canada
Grand Prix
Bronze medal – third place	Nice 2025	65 kg
Pan American Championships
Silver medal – second place	2024 Acapulco	70 kg
Silver medal – second place	2026 Coralville	65 kg
Bronze medal – third place	2025 Monterrey	65 kg
Representing Iran
Asian Championships
Bronze medal – third place	2019 Xi'an	65 kg
Junior World Championships
Gold medal – first place	2016 Mâcon	60 kg
Junior Asian Championships
Gold medal – first place	2015 Naypyidaw	60 kg

Peiman Biabani (born 4 November 1996 in Tehran, Iran) is an Iranian wrestler competing for Canada, where he now resides. He competed in the 2019 Asian Wrestling Championships at Xi'an, China, where he won the bronze medal in his event.

== Professional sports activity ==
=== Asian Championship 2019 ===
At 65 kg, Peyman Biabani won against Katay Yerlanbek from China 7–7 (criteria) in the first round. In the second round, he was defeated by Bajrang Punia, world silver medalist and Asian Games champion from India, 6–0. Because Punia reached the final, Biabani entered repechage, winning against Fernando Devoshan from Sri Lanka 11–0 and qualifying for the bronze-medal match, where he defeated Sirajuddin Hasanov from Uzbekistan 3–2 to win bronze.

== Achievements ==
Desert Pact titles in international wrestling tournaments:

- Dunklof, Bulgaria: (gold) 2016
- Kyiv, Ukraine: (bronze) 2017
- Alrosa Cup: (gold) 2018
- Tbilisi Grand Prix, Georgia: (silver) 2019
- Takhti Cup: (silver) 2021
