= Umidjon Jalolov =

Uzbek freestyle wrestler

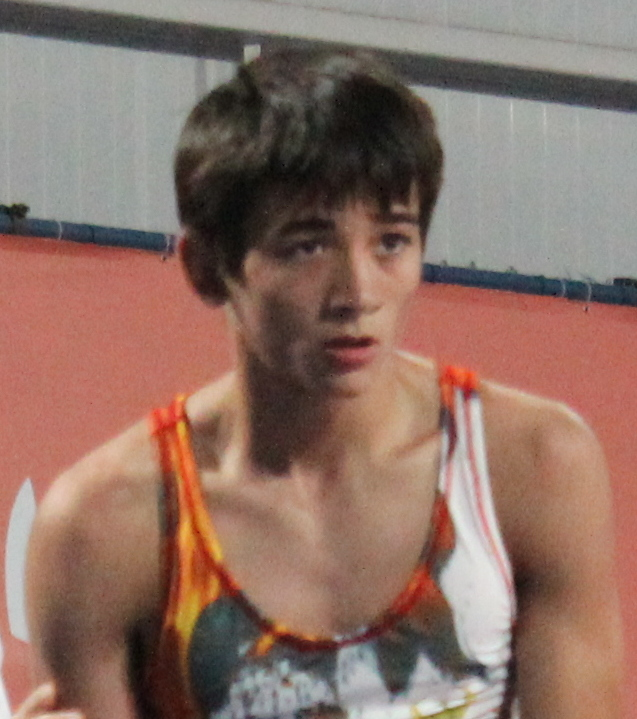
- Jalolov in 2018

Personal information
- Full name: Umidjon Utkirovich Jalolov
- Born: 12 July 2002 (age 24) Uzbekistan

Sport
- Country: Uzbekistan
- Sport: Wrestling
- Weight class: 65 kg
- Event: Freestyle
Medal record
Men's freestyle wrestling
Representing Uzbekistan
World Championships
Bronze medal – third place	2025 Zagreb	65 kg
Asian Championships
Silver medal – second place	2026 Bishkek	65 kg
Islamic Solidarity Games
Bronze medal – third place	2025 Riyadh	65 kg
U23 World Championships
Silver medal – second place	2025 Novi Sad	65 kg
Asian U23 Championships
Silver medal – second place	2025 Vũng Tàu	65 kg
U20 World Championships
Gold medal – first place	2022 Sofia	65 kg
Youth Olympic Games
Gold medal – first place	2018 Buenos Aires	48 kg
World Cadet Championships
Gold medal – first place	2019 Sofia	48 kg

Umidjon Utkirovich Jalolov (born 12 July 2002) is an Uzbek freestyle wrestler. He competed at the 2025 World Wrestling Championships, winning the bronze medal in the 65 kg event.
