= Yun Jun-sik =

South Korean wrestler (born 1991)

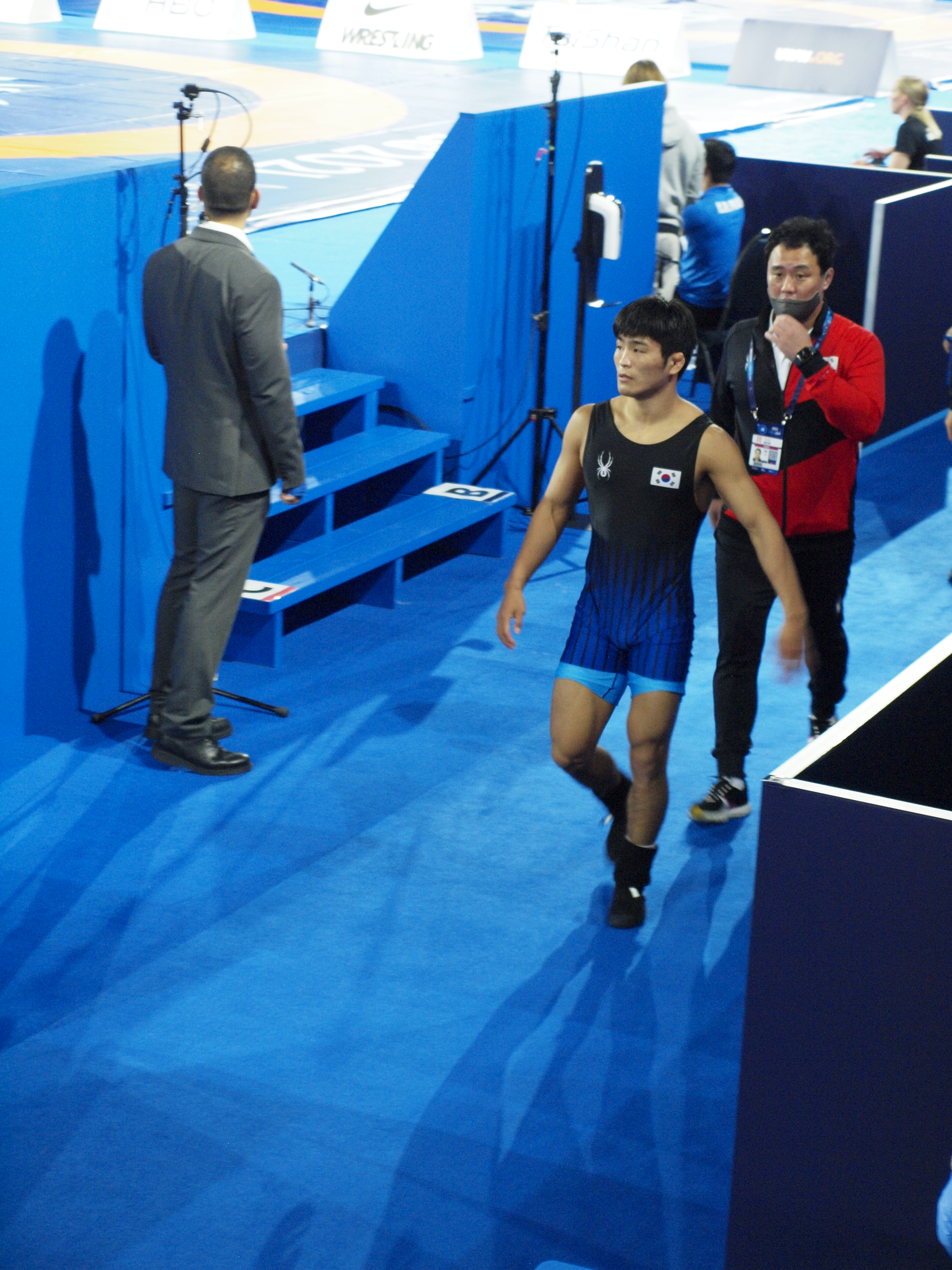
- at the 2021 World Wrestling Championships in Oslo, Norway

Personal information
- Born: 9 August 1991 (age 35)

Sport
- Country: South Korea
- Sport: Amateur wrestling
- Event: Freestyle

Yun Jun-sik (Korean: 윤준식, born 9 August 1991) is a South Korean freestyle wrestler. He competed in the men's freestyle 57 kg event at the 2016 Summer Olympics, in which he was eliminated in the round of 16 by Haji Aliyev.

He competed in the 65 kg event at the 2022 World Wrestling Championships held in Belgrade, Serbia.

He competed at the 2024 Asian Wrestling Olympic Qualification Tournament in Bishkek, Kyrgyzstan hoping to qualify for the 2024 Summer Olympics in Paris, France. He was eliminated in his third match and he did not qualify for the Olympics.
