= Kizhan Clarke =

German wrestler (born 1997)

Personal information
- Full name: Kizhan Andre Clarke
- Born: December 16, 1997 (age 28) Wiesbaden, Germany
- Home town: Tampa, Florida, U.S.

Sport
- Country: United States (2018–2022); Germany (2023–present)
- Sport: Wrestling
- Weight class: 65 kg (143 lb)
- Events: Freestyle and Folkstyle
- College team: North Carolina
- Club: Tar Heel Wrestling Club; AC Lichtenfels
- Coached by: Rob Koll
Medal record
Men's freestyle wrestling
Representing Germany
European Championships
Bronze medal – third place	2024 Bucharest	65 kg
Grand Prix
Silver medal – second place	2023 Nice	65 kg
Bronze medal – third place	2025 New York City	65 kg
German Nationals
Gold medal – first place	2023 Heidelberg	65 kg
Collegiate Wrestling
Representing the North Carolina Tar Heels
NCAA Division I Championships
Silver medal – second place	2022 Detroit	141 lb

Kizhan Andre Clarke (born December 16, 1997) is a German-American freestyle wrestler who competes internationally at 65 kilograms. He was a medalist at the European Championship and the Grand Prix Henri Deglane, and was also an NCAA Division I National runner-up out of the University of North Carolina.

== Career ==
=== High school ===
Clarke was born in Wiesbaden, Germany to an American father and a German mother. He moved to Dallas, Texas at the age of one, before moving to Florida in seventh grade. He started wrestling as a freshman at Riverview High School in Riverview, Florida, and became a state champion and two-time finalist before graduating.

=== American University ===
==== 2016–2017 ====
Clarke wore a redshirt during his first year wrestling for the American Eagles, winning over 30 matches and placing at six tournaments.

==== 2017–2018 ====
Clarke went 16–13 as the team's starter at 141 pounds, and was unable to place at the EIWA Championships or qualify for the NCAA's. After the season, he competed in freestyle at the US Open and the U23 US World Team Trials, but was unable to place.

==== 2018–2019 ====
Clarke then moved up to 157 pounds, recording a 26–13 record and placing seventh at the EIWA Championships, though missing a trip to NCAA's. After the season, he once again competed at the US Open and the U23 US World Team Trials though was unable to place.

==== 2019–2020 ====
Dropping down to 149 pounds, Clarke improved to a 35–7 record, placed fourth at the EIWA Championships and qualified for the NCAA tournament. However, the tournament was cancelled due to the COVID-19 pandemic. In November 2020, Clarke went 4–2 at the US U23 National Championships but was unable to place.

=== University of North Carolina ===
==== 2021–2022 ====
In March 2021, Clarke went 2–2 at the US Last Chance Qualifier, failing to qualify for the US Olympic Team Trials.

After being unable to compete during the 2020–2021 season due to COVID-19 protocols, Clarke transferred to the University of North Carolina for his final year. Back down to 141, Clarke posted a 17–1 record during the regular season before going 0–2 at the ACC Championships, requiring an at-large berth to qualify for the NCAA tournament.

Ranked as the fifteenth-seed, Clarke avenged a loss suffered at the ACC Championship in the first round, and took out returning NCAA finalist Jaydin Eierman to advance to the quarterfinals. After beating the tenth-seed to reach the semi-finals, Clarke defeated the sixth-seed on ultimate tie-breaker to reach the finals. In the finals, Clarke fell to returning champion Nick Lee, though earned runner-up and All-American honors and closed his final year at 21–4.

=== Germany ===
==== 2023 ====
In January, Clarke returned to freestyle and represented Germany for the first time in international competition, at the Grand Prix de France Henri Deglane. He defeated fellow NCAA runner-up Ridge Lovett and veteran Evan Henderson to make the finals, where he was defeated by All-American Pat Lugo.

In April, Clarke defeated Niklas Dorn in a best-of-three wrestle-off to determine Germany's starter. He then went 1–1 at the European Championships, defeating Italy's Colin Realbuto though falling to U20 World Champion Erik Arushanian.

In June, Clarke became a German National champion with three wins over fellow countrymen. He then competed at the Stepan Sargsyan Cup in Armenia, defeating an opponent from Kazakhstan before falling to U20 World Champion Peiman Biabani. In July, he competed at the Polyák Imre & Varga János Memorial Tournament, though was eliminated by North Carolina teammate Lachlan McNeil.

From September to November, Clarke competed in the German Bundesliga, where he participated in six dual meets for AC Lichtenfels and emerged victorious in four of them.

==== 2024 ====
In February, Clarke earned a bronze medal from the European Continental Championships, with a notable victory over Individual World Cup and U23 World Champion Vazgen Tevanyan. He competed at the 2024 European Wrestling Olympic Qualification Tournament in Baku, Azerbaijan hoping to qualify for the 2024 Summer Olympics in Paris, France. He was eliminated in his first match and he did not qualify for the Olympics.

== Freestyle record ==
Senior Freestyle Matches
Res.	Record	Opponent	Score	Date	Event	Location
2025 Bill Farrell Memorial (bronze) at 65 kg
Win	38-24	(The Bahamas) Shannon Hanna II	3-0	November 9, 2025	2025 Bill Farrell Memorial	(United States) New York City, New York
Win	37-24	(United States) Sam Latona	3-2	November 9, 2025	2025 Bill Farrell Memorial	(United States) New York City, New York
Win	36-23	(Ecuador) Josh Kramer	TF 10-0	November 9, 2025	2025 Bill Farrell Memorial	(United States) New York City, New York
Loss	35-22	(United States) Cael Happel	1-8	November 9, 2025	2025 Bill Farrell Memorial	(United States) New York City, New York
Win	35-21	(Jamaica) Jordan Mitchell	TF 13-1	November 9, 2025	2025 Bill Farrell Memorial	(United States) New York City, New York
2024 World Championships DNP at 70 kg
Loss	34–21	(Russia) Inalbek Sheriev	TF 0-10	October 28, 2024	2024 World Championships	Tirana, Albania
2024 World Olympic Qualification Tournament DNP at 65 kg
Loss	34–20	(Kazakhstan) Adlan Askarov	3–6	May 11, 2024	2024 World Olympic Qualification Tournament	Istanbul, Turkey
2024 European Championships (bronze) at 65 kg
Win	34–19	(Georgia (country)) Goderdzi Dzebisashvili	5–3	February 16–17, 2024	2024 European Continental Championships	Bucharest, Romania
Win	33–19	(Armenia) Vazgen Tevanyan	3–2	February 16–17, 2024	2024 European Continental Championships	Bucharest, Romania
Loss	32–19	(Russia) Gadzhimurad Rashidov	0–6	February 16–17, 2024	2024 European Continental Championships	Bucharest, Romania
Win	32–18	(North Macedonia) Besir Alili	Fall	February 16–17, 2024	2024 European Continental Championships	Bucharest, Romania
Win	31–18	(Germany) Danny Mayr	TF 16–0	November 25, 2023	2023 KG Baienfurt/Ravensburg – AC Lichtenfels (71 kg)	Germany
Win	30–18	(Germany) Magomed Kartojev	8–2	November 18, 2023	2023 AC Lichtenfels – SV Wacker Burghausen (71 kg)	Germany
Win	29–18	(Germany) Dawid Volny	7–0	November 4, 2023	2023 ASV Schorndorf – AC Lichtenfels (71 kg)	Germany
Loss	28–18	(Moldova) Nicolai Grahmez	1–9	October 21, 2023	2023 AC Lichtenfels – RSV Rotation Greiz (75 kg)	Germany
Win	28–17	(Germany) Roman Walters	TF 17–0	October 2, 2023	2023 AC Lichtenfels – AV Germania Markneukirchen (66 kg)	Germany
Loss	27–17	(Albania) Islam Dudaev	2–10	September 30, 2023	2023 AC Lichtenfels – ASV Schorndorf (66 kg)	Germany
2023 Polyák Imre & Varga János Memorial 15th at 65 kg
Loss	27–16	(Canada) Lachlan McNeil	3–5	July 13, 2023	2023 Polyák Imre & Varga János Memorial	Budapest, Hungary
2023 Stepan Sargsyan Cup 7th at 65 kg
Loss	26–15	(Iran) Peiman Biabani	1–3	June 15–17, 2023	2023 Stepan Sargsyan Cup	Yerevan, Armenia
Win	26–14	(Kazakhstan) Timur Aitkulov	11–10	June 15–17, 2023	2023 Stepan Sargsyan Cup	Yerevan, Armenia
2023 German Nationals (gold) at 65 kg
Win	25–14	(Germany) Niklas Dorn	6–1	June 8–11, 2023	2023 Deutsche Meisterschaft Männer	Heidelberg, Germany
Win	24–14	(Germany) Victor Lyzen	4–0	June 8–11, 2023	2023 Deutsche Meisterschaft Männer	Heidelberg, Germany
Win	23–14	(Germany) Alexander Semisorow	6–4	June 8–11, 2023	2023 Deutsche Meisterschaft Männer	Heidelberg, Germany
2023 European Championships 10th at 65 kg
Loss	22–14	(Ukraine) Erik Arushanian	2–2	April 17, 2023	2023 European Continental Championships	Zagreb, Croatia
Win	22–13	(Italy) Colin Realbuto	3–0	April 17, 2023	2023 European Continental Championships	Zagreb, Croatia
2023 German World Team Trials (gold) at 65 kg
Win	21–13	(Germany) Niklas Dorn	6–0	April 1–2, 2023	2023 German World Team Trials	Germany
Win	20–13	(Germany) Niklas Dorn	4–0	April 1–2, 2023	2023 German World Team Trials	Germany
2023 Henri Deglane Grand Prix (silver) at 65 kg
Loss	19–13	(United States) Pat Lugo	0–7	January 20–22, 2023	Grand Prix de France Henri Deglane 2023	Nice, France
Win	19–12	(United States) Evan Henderson	10–8	January 20–22, 2023	Grand Prix de France Henri Deglane 2023	Nice, France
Win	18–12	(United States) Ridge Lovett	4–1	January 20–22, 2023	Grand Prix de France Henri Deglane 2023	Nice, France
Win	17–12	(France) Quentin Sticker	TF 11–0	January 20–22, 2023	Grand Prix de France Henri Deglane 2023	Nice, France
2021 US Last Chance DNP at 65 kg
Loss	16–12	(United States) Mitch McKee	TF 1–12	March 27, 2021	2021 US Last Chance Olympic Trials Qualifier	(United States) Fort Worth, Texas
Loss	16–11	(United States) Evan Henderson	TF 2–13	March 27, 2021	2021 US Last Chance Olympic Trials Qualifier	(United States) Fort Worth, Texas
Win	16–10	(United States) Dean Heil	9–2	March 27, 2021	2021 US Last Chance Olympic Trials Qualifier	(United States) Fort Worth, Texas
Win	15–10	(United States) Mitch McKee	TF 14–4	March 27, 2021	2021 US Last Chance Olympic Trials Qualifier	(United States) Fort Worth, Texas
2020 U23 US Nationals 4th at 65 kg
Loss	14–10	(United States) Max Murin	TF 0–10	November 13–15, 2020	2020 U23 US National Championships	(United States) Omaha, Nebraska
Win	14–9	(United States) Clay Carlson	TF 10–0	November 13–15, 2020	2020 U23 US National Championships	(United States) Omaha, Nebraska
Loss	13–9	(United States) Don Demas	3–5	November 13–15, 2020	2020 U23 US National Championships	(United States) Omaha, Nebraska
Win	13–8	(United States) Cael Happel	TF 10–0	November 13–15, 2020	2020 U23 US National Championships	(United States) Omaha, Nebraska
Win	12–8	(United States) James Emmer	TF 10–0	November 13–15, 2020	2020 U23 US National Championships	(United States) Omaha, Nebraska
Win	11–8	(United States) Tony Mendoza	TF 11–0	November 13–15, 2020	2020 U23 US National Championships	(United States) Omaha, Nebraska
2019 U23 US World Team Trials DNP at 70 kg
Loss	10–8	(United States) Benjamin Lamantia	TF 0–11	June 1–3, 2019	2019 U23 US World Team Trials Challenge	(United States) Akron, Ohio
Win	10–7	(United States) Mike Van Brill	5–1	June 1–3, 2019	2019 U23 US World Team Trials Challenge	(United States) Akron, Ohio
Win	9–7	(United States) Seth Hogue	7–6	June 1–3, 2019	2019 U23 US World Team Trials Challenge	(United States) Akron, Ohio
Win	8–7	(United States) Anthony Scantlin	TF 10–0	June 1–3, 2019	2019 U23 US World Team Trials Challenge	(United States) Akron, Ohio
Loss	7–7	(United States) Kendall Coleman	3–7	June 1–3, 2019	2019 U23 US World Team Trials Challenge	(United States) Akron, Ohio
Win	7–6	(United States) Benjamin Brancale	8–6	June 1–3, 2019	2019 U23 US World Team Trials Challenge	(United States) Akron, Ohio
Win	6–6	(United States) Kevin Budock	TF 12–1	June 1–3, 2019	2019 U23 US World Team Trials Challenge	(United States) Akron, Ohio
2019 US Open DNP at 70 kg
Loss	5–6	(United States) Jake Keating	TF 1–12	April 23–26, 2019	2019 US Open National Championships	(United States) Las Vegas, Nevada
Win	5–5	(United States) Zehlin Storr	6–1	April 23–26, 2019	2019 US Open National Championships	(United States) Las Vegas, Nevada
Loss	4–5	(United States) Jason Nolf	TF 0–10	April 23–26, 2019	2019 US Open National Championships	(United States) Las Vegas, Nevada
Win	4–4	(United States) Carlos Herrera	TF 14–2	April 23–26, 2019	2019 US Open National Championships	(United States) Las Vegas, Nevada
2018 U23 US World Team Trials DNP at 70 kg
Loss	3–4	(United States) Matthew Kolodzik	2–6	June 1–3, 2018	2018 U23 US World Team Trials Challenge	(United States) Akron, Ohio
Loss	3–3	(United States) Hayden Hidlay	TF 0–10	June 1–3, 2018	2018 U23 US World Team Trials Challenge	(United States) Akron, Ohio
Win	3–2	(United States) Austin Singer	TF 10–0	June 1–3, 2018	2018 U23 US World Team Trials Challenge	(United States) Akron, Ohio
Win	2–2	(United States) Sammy Peticos	TF 10–0	June 1–3, 2018	2018 U23 US World Team Trials Challenge	(United States) Akron, Ohio
2018 US Open DNP at 70 kg
Loss	1–2	(United States) Josh Reyes	TF 0–10	April 24–28, 2018	2018 US Open National Championships	(United States) Las Vegas, Nevada
Win	1–1	(United States) Jacob Hatley	TF 10–0	April 24–28, 2018	2018 US Open National Championships	(United States) Las Vegas, Nevada
Loss	0–1	(United States) Matthew Kolodzik	TF 5–16	April 24–28, 2018	2018 US Open National Championships	(United States) Las Vegas, Nevada
