= Ridge Lovett =

American wrestler (born 2000)

Personal information
- Born: August 25, 2000 (age 26) Post Falls, Idaho, U.S.
- Weight: 70 kg (150 lb)

Sport
- Country: United States
- Sport: Wrestling
- Events: Freestyle and Folkstyle
- College team: Nebraska
- Club: Nebraska Wrestling Training Center
Medal record
Men's freestyle wrestling
Representing the United States
Pan American Championships
Gold medal – first place	2026 Coralville	70 kg
Grand Prix
Bronze medal – third place	2023 Nice	65kg
Collegiate Wrestling
Representing the Nebraska Cornhuskers
NCAA Division I Championships
Gold medal – first place	2025 Philadelphia	149 lb
Silver medal – second place	2022 Detroit	149 lb
Big Ten Championships
Gold medal – first place	2025 Evanston	149 lb
Gold medal – first place	2024 College Park	149 lb
Silver medal – second place	2021 State College	149 lb

Ridge Lovett (born August 25, 2000) is an American freestyle and folkstyle wrestler who competes at 70 kilograms. Lovett competed collegiately for Nebraska, where he was an NCAA Champion, 3-time All-American, 5-time NCAA Qualifier and a 2-time Big 10 Tournament Champion.

== Career ==
=== High School ===
Lovett was born and raised in Post Falls, Idaho. Wrestling was a central part of his upbringing, as his family was heavily involved in the sport and operated a local wrestling club. According to Lovett, he spent much of his childhood in wrestling rooms before he was old enough to compete himself.

At Post Falls High School, Lovett became one of the most decorated wrestlers in Idaho history. He amassed a 170–0 career record, captured four Idaho state championships, and earned national recognition through performances in major high school tournaments. His undefeated career placed him among the most successful wrestlers ever produced by the state and established him as a blue-chip recruit entering the collegiate ranks.

=== Nebraska ===
==== 2019-2020 ====
Lovett immediately entered Nebraska's varsity lineup as a true freshman at 133 pounds. Wrestling in one of the nation's deepest weight classes, he qualified for the NCAA Championships after placing seventh at the Big Ten Championships. He finished the season with a 17–8 record and was positioned to compete at the national tournament before the event was canceled because of the COVID-19 pandemic.

==== 2020-2021 ====
Moving up to 149 pounds, posted a 9–3 record during the pandemic-shortened season and qualified for the NCAA Championships for the second consecutive year by placing second at the Big 10 Championships falling to Ohio State's Sammy Sasso in the finals. Lovett fell short of All-American status, at the NCAA tournament in St. Louis, Missouri. Lovett defeated Michigan State's Peyton Omania in the opening round before being eliminated from All-American contention with losses to Iowa's Max Murin and Duke's Josh Finesilver.

==== 2021-2022 ====
Lovett enjoyed a breakthrough campaign during the 2021–22 season. Lovett finished fourth at the Big 10 Championships, qualifying for his third NCAA Championship. He ultimately placed second at the national tournament, earning All-American honors for the first time in his career. Lovett fell to Yianni Diakomihalis in the finals.

==== 2022-2023 ====
Lovett's 2022–23 season was significantly limited by his decision to redshirt. Lovett's only competition of the year was the Cowboy Open, finishing 4–0 with all four victories by bonus points.

==== 2023-2024 ====
The 2023–24 season represented one of the finest years of Lovett's collegiate career. He opened the campaign undefeated through much of the regular season and climbed to the No. 1 ranking nationally at 149 pounds. His victories included multiple wins over top-ten opponents, leading to his selection as NCAA Wrestler of the Week in February 2024.

At the Big Ten Championships, Lovett captured his first conference title, becoming Nebraska's champion at 149 pounds. He advanced to the NCAA Championships as one of the favorites to win the national title and ultimately finished sixth, earning his second All-American honor.

==== 2024-2025 ====
Entering his final collegiate season, Lovett was widely viewed as a national title contender. Throughout the regular season he recorded victories over numerous top-ranked opponents, including Penn State All-American Shayne Van Ness. His performances earned him two Big Ten Wrestler of the Week awards during the season.

At the 2025 Big Ten Championships in Evanston, Illinois, Lovett successfully defended his conference title. He dominated the tournament, recording technical falls, major decisions, and a championship-match victory over Illinois' Kannon Webster.

The defining achievement of his collegiate career came at the 2025 NCAA Division I Wrestling Championships. Entering the tournament as the No. 2 seed, Lovett advanced through the bracket with victories over Sam Cartella, Ty Whalen, Kannon Webster, and Shayne Van Ness. In the national championship match, he defeated top-seeded Caleb Henson of Virginia Tech by a 1–0 score to claim the NCAA title at 149 pounds. The championship made him Nebraska's first NCAA wrestling champion since 2011 and capped a career that included three All-American finishes and multiple conference titles.

=== Freestyle ===
In April 2026, Lovett won the U.S. Open championship at 70 kilograms, earning a berth in Final X and positioning himself one series away from representing the United States at the World Championships. Lovett defeated familiar foe Caleb Henson 14–12 in the finals to capture the title.

On June 1, 2026, Lovett recorded one of the most significant victories of his freestyle career when he defeated Olympic bronze medalist Bajrang Punia of India at RAF 09 in Dallas, Texas.

== Freestyle record ==
Senior Freestyle Matches
Res.	Record	Opponent	Score	Date	Event	Location
Win	19-7	(United States) Jordan Oliver	13-2	October 23, 2026	RAF 14	(United States) Las Vegas, Nevada
2026 US World Team Trials TBD at 70 kg
Loss	18-7	(United States) Zain Retherford	2-8	June 19, 2026	2026 Final X	(United States) Newark, New Jersey
Loss	18-6	(United States) Zain Retherford	1-2	June 19, 2026	2026 Final X	(United States) Newark, New Jersey
Win	18-5	(India) Bajrang Punia	13-8	May 30, 2026	RAF 09	(United States) Arlington, Texas
2026 Pan American Wrestling Championships (gold) at 70 kg
Win	17-5	(Puerto Rico) Victor Soto Rivera	Fall	May 10, 2026	2026 Pan American Wrestling Championships	(United States) Coralville, Iowa
Win		(Argentina) Mauricio Lovera	Injury Default	May 10, 2026	2026 Pan American Wrestling Championships	(United States) Coralville, Iowa
Win	16-5	(Mexico) Francisco Gonzalez Torres	TF 10–0	May 10, 2026	2026 Pan American Wrestling Championships	(United States) Coralville, Iowa
Win	15-5	(Canada) Michael Zale	TF 10–0	May 10, 2026	2026 Pan American Wrestling Championships	(United States) Coralville, Iowa
2026 US Open (gold) at 70 kg
Win	14-5	(United States) Caleb Henson	14–12	April 26, 2026	2026 US Open National Championships	(United States) Las Vegas, Nevada
Win	13-5	(United States) Alec Pantaleo	TF 17–6	April 26, 2026	2026 US Open National Championships	(United States) Las Vegas, Nevada
Win	12-5	(United States) Ian Parker	8–3	April 26, 2026	2026 US Open National Championships	(United States) Las Vegas, Nevada
Win	11-5	(United States) Nick Sanko	TF 10–0	April 26, 2026	2026 US Open National Championships	(United States) Las Vegas, Nevada
Win	10-5	(United States) Jonathan Millner	TF 12–0	April 26, 2026	2026 US Open National Championships	(United States) Las Vegas, Nevada
2026 Muhamet Malo Tournament DNP at 70 kg
Loss	9-5	(Kazakhstan) Maiis Aliyev	5–5	March 1, 2026	2026 Muhamet Malo Tournament	Tirana, Albania
2025 US World Team Trials 4th at 70 kg
Loss	9-4	(United States) Ian Parker	4–5	May 16, 2025	2025 US World Team Trials	(United States) Louisville, Kentucky
Win	9-3	(United States) Jackson Arrington	7–6	May 16, 2025	2025 US World Team Trials	(United States) Louisville, Kentucky
Loss	8-3	(United States) PJ Duke	2–3	May 16, 2025	2025 US World Team Trials	(United States) Louisville, Kentucky
Win	8-2	(United States) Ian Parker	TF 10–0	May 16, 2025	2025 US World Team Trials	(United States) Louisville, Kentucky
2023 US Open 6th at 65 kg
Loss		(United States) Anthony Ashnault	FF	April 26, 2023	2023 US Open National Championships	(United States) Las Vegas, Nevada
Loss		(United States) Matthew Kolodzik		April 26, 2023	2023 US Open National Championships	(United States) Las Vegas, Nevada
Loss	7-2	(United States) Joey McKenna	3–8	April 26, 2023	2023 US Open National Championships	(United States) Las Vegas, Nevada
Win	7-1	(United States) Pat Lugo	7–5	April 26, 2023	2023 US Open National Championships	(United States) Las Vegas, Nevada
Win	6-1	(United States) Cole Matthews	5–1	April 26, 2023	2023 US Open National Championships	(United States) Las Vegas, Nevada
Win	5-1	(United States) Luke Lucerne	TF 10–0	April 26, 2023	2023 US Open National Championships	(United States) Las Vegas, Nevada
2023 Grand Prix de France Henri Deglane (bronze) at 65 kg
Win	4-1	(United States) Matthew Kolodzik	15–12	January 20, 2023	Grand Prix de France Henri Deglane	Nice, France
Win	3-1	(Argentina) Agustín Destribats	8–2	January 20, 2023	Grand Prix de France Henri Deglane	Nice, France
Win	2-1	(France) Khamzat Arsamerzouev	5–3	January 20, 2023	Grand Prix de France Henri Deglane	Nice, France
Loss	1-1	(Germany) Kizhan Clarke	1–4	January 20, 2023	Grand Prix de France Henri Deglane	Nice, France
Win	1-0	(Kazakhstan) Nariman Serikbayev	TF 15–4	January 20, 2023	Grand Prix de France Henri Deglane	Nice, France

== Greco record ==
Senior Greco Matches
Res.	Record	Opponent	Score	Date	Event	Location
2020 US Senior Nationals DNP at 67 kg
Loss	2–2	(United States) Morgan Flaharty	TF 4–12	October 9, 2020	2020 US Senior National Championships	(United States) Coralville, Iowa
Win	2–1	(United States) Bobby Treshock	TF 12–4	October 9, 2020	2020 US Senior National Championships	(United States) Coralville, Iowa
Loss	1–1	(United States) Duncan Nelson	7–12	October 9, 2020	2020 US Senior National Championships	(United States) Coralville, Iowa
Win	1–0	(United States) Justin Feldman	TF 12–0	October 9, 2020	2020 US Senior National Championships	(United States) Coralville, Iowa
