= 2024 European Wrestling Championships – Men's freestyle 65 kg =

Wrestling competition

Men's freestyle 65 kg at the 2024 European Wrestling Championships
- Venue: Polyvalent Hall
- Location: Bucharest, Romania
- Dates: 16-17 February
- Competitors: 19

Medalists
gold medal	Islam Dudaev	Albania
silver medal	Gadzhimurad Rashidov	Individual Neutral Athletes
bronze medal	Andre Clarke	Germany
bronze medal	Ali Rahimzade	Azerbaijan

The men's freestyle 65 kg is a competition featured at the 2024 European Wrestling Championships, and was held in Bucharest, Romania on February 16 and 17.

== Results ==
Legend

- F — Won by fall

=== Final ===
Final
Gadzhimurad Rashidov (AIN)	1
Islam Dudaev (ALB)	2

=== Top half ===
Round of 32
Besir Alili (MKD)	0
Andre Clarke (GER)	6^{F}

Round of 16
Vazgen Tevanyan (ARM)	7
Krzysztof Bieńkowski (POL)	2
Andre Clarke (GER)	0
Gadzhimurad Rashidov (AIN)	6
Carlos Álvarez (ESP)	0
Goderdzi Dzebisashvili (GEO)	10
Nino Leutert (SUI)	12
Josh Finesilver (ISR)	4

Quarterfinals
Vazgen Tevanyan (ARM)	4
Gadzhimurad Rashidov (AIN)	5
Goderdzi Dzebisashvili (GEO)	7
Nino Leutert (SUI)	2

Semifinals
Gadzhimurad Rashidov (AIN)	12
Goderdzi Dzebisashvili (GEO)	1

=== Bottom half ===
Round of 32
Abdullah Toprak (TUR)	3
Islam Dudaev (ALB)	6
Mikyay Naim (BUL)	1
Islam Guseinov (AIN)	14

Round of 16
Ayub Musaev (BEL)	0
Khamzat Arsamerzouev (FRA)	11
Islam Dudaev (ALB)	8
Ștefan Coman (ROU)	1
Ali Rahimzade (AZE)	7
Islam Guseinov (AIN)	4
Erik Arushanian (UKR)	7
Maxim Saculțan (MDA)	2

Quarterfinals
Khamzat Arsamerzouev (FRA)	0
Islam Dudaev (ALB)	4
Ali Rahimzade (AZE)	3
Erik Arushanian (UKR)	0

Semifinals
Islam Dudaev (ALB)	3
Ali Rahimzade (AZE)	1

=== Repechage ===
Repechage round 1
Abdullah Toprak (TUR)	9
Ștefan Coman (ROU)	11

Repechage round 2
Andre Clarke (GER)	3
Vazgen Tevanyan (ARM)	2
Ștefan Coman (ROU)	4
Khamzat Arsamerzouev (FRA)	5

Bronze medal match
Andre Clarke (GER)	5
Goderdzi Dzebisashvili (GEO)	3
Khamzat Arsamerzouev (FRA)	0
Ali Rahimzade (AZE)	4

== Final standing ==
Rank	Athlete
1st place, gold medalist(s)	Islam Dudaev (ALB)
2nd place, silver medalist(s)	Gadzhimurad Rashidov (AIN)
3rd place, bronze medalist(s)	Andre Clarke (GER)
3rd place, bronze medalist(s)	Ali Rahimzade (AZE)
5	Goderdzi Dzebisashvili (GEO)
5	Khamzat Arsamerzouev (FRA)
7	Islam Guseinov (AIN)
8	Ștefan Coman (ROU)
9	Vazgen Tevanyan (ARM)
10	Nino Leutert (SUI)
11	Erik Arushanian (UKR)
12	Abdullah Toprak (TUR)
13	Josh Finesilver (ISR)
14	Maxim Saculțan (MDA)
15	Krzysztof Bieńkowski (POL)
16	Mikyay Naim (BUL)
17	Besir Alili (MKD)
18	Carlos Álvarez (ESP)
19	Ayub Musaev (BEL)
