= Agustín Destribats =

Argentine wrestler (born 1997)

Personal information
- Full name: Agustín Alejandro Destribats
- Born: 30 October 1997 (age 29) Córdoba, Argentina
- Height: 170 cm (5 ft 7 in)

Sport
- Country: Argentina
- Sport: Amateur wrestling
- Weight class: 65 kg
- Event: Freestyle
- Club: Latina
- Coached by: Leonardo Torres
Medal record
Representing Argentina
Men's freestyle wrestling
Individual World Cup
Bronze medal – third place	2020 Belgrade	61 kg
Pan American Games
Bronze medal – third place	2023 Santiago	65 kg
Pan American Championships
Gold medal – first place	2025 Monterrey	65 kg
Silver medal – second place	2024 Acapulco	65 kg
Bronze medal – third place	2022 Acapulco	65 kg
Bronze medal – third place	2020 Ottawa	65 kg
Bronze medal – third place	2019 Buenos Aires	65 kg
Grand Prix
Gold medal – first place	2021 Plovdiv	65 kg
Silver medal – second place	2017 Rio de Janeiro	65 kg
Bronze medal – third place	2023 Sofia	65 kg
Bronze medal – third place	2022 Bucharest	65 kg
Bronze medal – third place	2019 Nice	65 kg
South American Games
Gold medal – first place	2026 Santa Fe	65 kg
Gold medal – first place	2022 Asunción	65 kg
Silver medal – second place	2018 Cochabamba	65 kg
South American Championships
Gold medal – first place	2017 Rio de Janeiro	61 kg
Gold medal – first place	2016 Cartagena	61 kg
Gold medal – first place	2015 Santiago	57 kg
U20 Pan American Championships
Gold medal – first place	2017 Lima	60 kg
Gold medal – first place	2016 Barinas	60 kg
South American Youth Games
Gold medal – first place	2013 Lima	63 kg
Men's Greco-Roman wrestling
U20 Pan American Championships
Gold medal – first place	2017 Lima	60 kg
South American Youth Games
Gold medal – first place	2013 Lima	60 kg
Men's Beach wrestling
Pan American Championships
Gold medal – first place	2025 Queretaro	70 kg

Agustín Alejandro Destribats (born 30 October 1997) is an Argentine freestyle wrestler who competes at 65 kilograms. He has represented Argentina at the 2020 Summer Olympics, at the 2023 Pan American Games, earning bronze, and the 2018 and 2022 editions of the South American Games, earning silver and gold respectively.

A bronze medalist at the 2020 Individual World Cup, Destribats also claimed the gold medal in the 2025 edition of the Pan American Championships, where he is a five-time medalist.

== Career ==
=== 2013–2019 ===
Destribats started wrestling when he was nine years old in a local club that offered savate, capoeira, and wrestling. In 2013 he won the South American Youth Games in both, freestyle and Greco-Roman and in 2014 he won gold at the U17 Pan American Championships in freestyle.

In 2015, he won his first major title at the senior level, earning a gold medal at the South American Championships in the 57 kilogram category at 18 years old.

In 2016, Destribats moved up to 61 kilograms and won his second consecutive senior South American Championship, also claiming a U20 Pan American title. In 2017, he claimed three South American Championship gold medals (two at the U20 level in both styles and one senior title in freestyle), two gold medals (freestyle and Greco) at the U20 Pan American Championships and a silver medal at the Brazil Cup, moving up to 65 kilograms for the latter.

In 2018, he claimed a silver medal at the South American Games. In 2019, he claimed bronze medals at the Pan American Championships and at the Henri Deglane Challenge.

=== 2020–2021 ===
In 2020, Destribats competed once again at the Pan American Championships, earning his first medal at the tournament with a bronze and only falling to two-time age-group World Champion Yianni Diakomihalis.

In the following days, Destribats competed at the Pan American Olympic Qualification Tournament. After advancing to the semifinals, he upset U17 World Champion and three-time NCAA champion Zain Retherford from the United States, pinning him early in the first period and qualifying to represent Argentina at the 2020 Summer Olympics. He became the first male Argentine wrestler to qualify for the Olympic Games since Paulo Ibire in 1996. Destribats did not compete in the championship match due to a knee injury.

After the Olympic Games were postponed due to the COVID-19 pandemic, Destribats trimmed down to 61 kilograms and claimed a bronze medal from the 2020 Individual World Cup, notably defeating U23 World champion Ulukbek Zholdoshbekov and World medalist Rahul Aware in the process.

Back up at 65 kilograms in 2021, Destribats placed fifth at the Grand Prix de France Henri Deglane, first at the Dan Kolov & Nikola Petrov Grand Prix and seventh at the Pan American Championships, before competing at the 2020 Summer Olympics in August. He was eliminated in the first round by World medalist from Hungary Ismail Musukaev.

=== 2022–2024 ===
To start off 2022, Destribats repeated as a bronze medalist at the Pan American Championships. Placing fourth and third at the Tunis Ranking Series and the Ion Cornianu & Ladislau Simon Memorial, respectively, he then made his first World Championship appearance in the 2022 edition. After defeating World Champion from Georgia Beka Lomtadze, Destribats fell to three-time World Champion from Azerbaijan Haji Aliyev. He then claimed the gold medal at the 2022 South American Games held in Asunción, Paraguay.

To start off 2023, Destribats placed seventh, tenth and ninth at the Grand Prix de France Henri Deglane, the Grand Prix Zagreb Open and the Ibrahim Moustafa Ranking Series, respectively, before claiming bronze medals at the Dan Kolov & Nikola Petrov Grand Prix and the Pan American Championships.

Destribats then placed fifth and nineteenth at the Kaba Uulu Kozhomkul & Raatbek Sanatbaev Memorial & Ranking Series and the Polyák Imre & Varga János Memorial & Ranking Series, respectively, before placing fourteenth in his second appearance at the World Championships. To close out the year, he claimed a bronze medal for Argentina at the 2023 Pan American Games.

After a tenth-place finish at the Grand Prix Zagreb Open to start off 2024, Destribats upgraded to a silver medal at the Pan American Championships, defeating two foreign opponents before forfeiting in the finals to Nick Lee due to injury. In the following days, he competed at the Pan American Olympic Qualification Tournament held in Acapulco, Mexico hoping to qualify for the 2024 Summer Olympics in Paris, France. He was eliminated by Cuba's two-time World Championship medalist Alejandro Valdés in the first round.

=== 2025 ===
After an eleventh-place finish at the Muhamet Malo Ranking Series to start off 2025, Destribats became Argentina's first ever male to win the gold medal at the Pan American Championships, defeating two-time champion of the tournament Joseph McKenna from the United States in the finals.

== Freestyle record ==
International Senior Freestyle Matches
Res.	Record	Opponent	Score	Date	Event	Location
2025 Pan American Championships (gold) at 65 kg
Win	72–47	(United States) Joseph McKenna	5–4	11 May 2025	2025 Pan American Championships	Monterrey, Mexico
Win	71–47	(Venezuela) Wilfredo Rodriguez	4–4	11 May 2025	2025 Pan American Championships	Monterrey, Mexico
Win	70–47	(Chile) Matias Muñoz	TF 10–0	11 May 2025	2025 Pan American Championships	Monterrey, Mexico
2025 Muhamet Malo Ranking Series 11th at 65 kg
Loss	69–47	(Kazakhstan) Adlan Askarov	7–8	26 February 2025	2025 Muhamet Malo Ranking Series	Tirana, Albania
2024 Pan American Olympic Qualification Tournament 7th at 65 kg
Loss	69–46	(Cuba) Alejandro Valdés	6–10	1 March 2024	2024 Pan American Olympic Qualification Tournament	Acapulco, Mexico
2024 Pan American Championships (silver) at 65 kg
Loss	—N/a	(United States) Nick Lee	FF	24 February 2024	2024 Pan American Championships	Acapulco, Mexico
Win	69–45	(Dominican Republic) Álbaro Rudesindo	3–1	24 February 2024	2024 Pan American Championships	Acapulco, Mexico
Win	68–45	(The Bahamas) Shannon Hanna	5–2	24 February 2024	2024 Pan American Championships	Acapulco, Mexico
2024 Grand Prix Zagreb Open 10th at 65 kg
Loss	67–45	(Turkey) Abdullah Toprak	2–3	10 February 2024	2024 Grand Prix Zagreb Open	Zagreb, Croatia
Loss	67–44	(Iran) Rahman Amouzad	TF 10–0	10 February 2024	2024 Grand Prix Zagreb Open	Zagreb, Croatia
Win	67–43	(France) Quentin Sticker	8–3	10 February 2024	2024 Grand Prix Zagreb Open	Zagreb, Croatia
2023 Pan American Games (bronze) at 65 kg
Win	66–43	(Peru) Sixto Auccapiña	7–1	2 November 2023	2023 Pan American Games	Santiago, Chile
Loss	65–43	(United States) Nahshon Garrett	5–7	2 November 2023	2023 Pan American Games	Santiago, Chile
Win	65–42	(Bolivia) Marvin Chávez	TF 11–0	2 November 2023	2023 Pan American Games	Santiago, Chile
2023 World Championships 14th at 65 kg
Loss	64–42	(Russia) Shamil Mamedov	1–10	18 September 2023	2023 World Championships	Belgrade, Serbia
Win	64–41	(Switzerland) Nino Leutert	TF 10–0	18 September 2023	2023 World Championships	Belgrade, Serbia
2023 Polyák Imre & Varga János Ranking Series 19th at 65 kg
Loss	63–41	(Albania) Islam Dudaev	1–8	13 July 2023	2023 Polyák Imre & Varga János Ranking Series	Budapest, Hungary
2023 Kaba Uulu Kozhomkul & Raatbek Sanatbaev Ranking Series 5th at 65 kg
Loss	63–40	(Kyrgyzstan) Ikromzhon Khadzhimurodov	2–8	4 June 2023	2023 Kaba Uulu Kozhomkul & Raatbek Sanatbaev Ranking Series	Bishkek, Kyrgyzstan
Loss	63–39	(Kyrgyzstan) Alibek Osmonov	3–3	4 June 2023	2023 Kaba Uulu Kozhomkul & Raatbek Sanatbaev Ranking Series	Bishkek, Kyrgyzstan
Win	63–38	(Azerbaijan) Ali Rahimzade	3–1	4 June 2023	2023 Kaba Uulu Kozhomkul & Raatbek Sanatbaev Ranking Series	Bishkek, Kyrgyzstan
Win	62–38	(China) Biekezhati Nuerlaxi	TF 10–0	4 June 2023	2023 Kaba Uulu Kozhomkul & Raatbek Sanatbaev Ranking Series	Bishkek, Kyrgyzstan
2023 Pan American Championships (bronze) at 65 kg
Win	61–38	(Peru) Sixto Pedragas	TF 11–0	6 May 2023	2023 Pan American Championships	Buenos Aires, Argentina
Loss	60–38	(United States) Yianni Diakomihalis	8–9	6 May 2023	2023 Pan American Championships	Buenos Aires, Argentina
Win	60–37	(Venezuela) Wilfredo Bocaney	10–2	6 May 2023	2023 Pan American Championships	Buenos Aires, Argentina
Win	59–37	(Bolivia) Marvin Claros	TF 10–0	6 May 2023	2023 Pan American Championships	Buenos Aires, Argentina
2023 Dan Kolov & Nikola Petrov Grand Prix (bronze) at 65 kg
Win	58–37	(France) Marwane Yezza	TF 11–0	2–3 March 2023	2023 Dan Kolov & Nikola Petrov Grand Prix	Sofia, Bulgaria
Win	57–37	(Iran) Amir-Ali Asad	TF 11–0	2–3 March 2023	2023 Dan Kolov & Nikola Petrov Grand Prix	Sofia, Bulgaria
Loss	56–37	(Japan) Kotaro Kiyooka	6–7	2–3 March 2023	2023 Dan Kolov & Nikola Petrov Grand Prix	Sofia, Bulgaria
Win	56–36	(Bulgaria) Vladimir Dubov	9–4	2–3 March 2023	2023 Dan Kolov & Nikola Petrov Grand Prix	Sofia, Bulgaria
2023 Ibrahim Moustafa Ranking Series 9th at 65 kg
Loss	55–36	(Georgia (country)) Edemi Bolkvadze	6–7	26 February 2023	2023 Ibrahim Moustafa Ranking Series	Alexandria, Egypt
Loss	55–35	(Armenia) Vazgen Tevanyan	1–6	26 February 2023	2023 Ibrahim Moustafa Ranking Series	Alexandria, Egypt
Win	55–34	(Kazakhstan) Ilyas Amanzholov	12–9	26 February 2023	2023 Ibrahim Moustafa Ranking Series	Alexandria, Egypt
2023 Grand Prix Zagreb Open 10th at 65 kg
Loss	54–34	(United States) Evan Henderson	14–15	1 February 2023	2023 Grand Prix Zagreb Open	Zagreb, Croatia
Loss	54–33	(Mongolia) Tömör-Ochiryn Tulga	TF 0–11	1 February 2023	2023 Grand Prix Zagreb Open	Zagreb, Croatia
2023 Henri Deglane Grand Prix 7th at 65 kg
Loss	54–32	(United States) Evan Henderson	Fall	20–22 January 2023	Grand Prix de France Henri Deglane 2023	Nice, France
Win	54–31	(Germany) Julien Zinser	TF 10–0	20–22 January 2023	Grand Prix de France Henri Deglane 2023	Nice, France
Win	53–31	(United States) Anthony Ashnault	8–6	20–22 January 2023	Grand Prix de France Henri Deglane 2023	Nice, France
2022 South American Games (gold) at 65 kg
Win	52–31	(Venezuela) Wilfredo Rodriguez	TF 10–0	14 October 2022	2022 South American Games	Asuncion, Paraguay
Win	51–31	(Bolivia) Marvin Chavez	TF 10–0	14 October 2022	2022 South American Games	Asuncion, Paraguay
Win	50–31	(Panama) Wilfredo Lopez	TF 12–0	14 October 2022	2022 South American Games	Asuncion, Paraguay
2022 World Championships 14th at 65 kg
Loss	49–31	(Azerbaijan) Haji Aliyev	1–6	17 September 2022	2022 World Championships	Belgrade, Serbia
Win	49–30	(Georgia (country)) Beka Lomtadze	9–1	17 September 2022	2022 World Championships	Belgrade, Serbia
2022 Ion Cornianu & Ladislau Simon (bronze) at 65 kg
Win	48–30	(India) Sujeet Kalkal	12–9	29–31 July 2022	2022 Ion Cornianu & Ladislau Simon Memorial	Bucharest, Romania
Loss	47–30	(Kyrgyzstan) Alibek Osmonov	8–11	29–31 July 2022	2022 Ion Cornianu & Ladislau Simon Memorial	Bucharest, Romania
Win	47–29	(France) Ilman Mukhtarov	10–5	29–31 July 2022	2022 Ion Cornianu & Ladislau Simon Memorial	Bucharest, Romania
Win	46–29	(France) Quentin Sticker	8–6	29–31 July 2022	2022 Ion Cornianu & Ladislau Simon Memorial	Bucharest, Romania
Win	45–29	(Moldova) Vitale Bunici	7–5	29–31 July 2022	2022 Ion Cornianu & Ladislau Simon Memorial	Bucharest, Romania
2022 Tunis Ranking Series 4th at 65 kg
Loss	44–29	(India) Sujeet Kalkal	TF 4–15	17 July 2022	2022 Tunis Ranking Series	Tunis, Tunisia
Loss	44–28	(Kazakhstan) Adlan Askarov	2–2	17 July 2022	2022 Tunis Ranking Series	Tunis, Tunisia
Loss	44–27	(United States) Yianni Diakomihalis	2–9	17 July 2022	2022 Tunis Ranking Series	Tunis, Tunisia
2022 Pan American Championships (bronze) at 65 kg
Win	44–26	(Chile) Andre Quispe	TF 10–0	8 May 2022	2022 Pan American Championships	Acapulco, Mexico
Loss	43–26	(United States) Joseph McKenna	5–13	8 May 2022	2022 Pan American Championships	Acapulco, Mexico
Win	43–25	(Peru) Sixto Auccapina	6–1	8 May 2022	2022 Pan American Championships	Acapulco, Mexico
Win	42–25	(Colombia) Uber Cuero	5–4	8 May 2022	2022 Pan American Championships	Acapulco, Mexico
2020 Summer Olympics 11th at 65 kg
Loss	41–25	(Hungary) Ismail Musukaev	6–9	6 August 2021	2020 Summer Olympics	Tokyo, Japan
2021 Pan American Championships 7th at 65 kg
Loss	41–24	(Puerto Rico) Sebastian Rivera	1–6	30 May 2021	2021 Pan American Championships	Guatemala City, Guatemala
Win	41–23	(Canada) Dillon Williams	4–2	30 May 2021	2021 Pan American Championships	Guatemala City, Guatemala
2021 Dan Kolov - Nikola Petrov Tournament (gold) at 65 kg
Win	40–23	(Romania) Stefan Coman	7–4	8–11 April 2021	2021 Dan Kolov - Nikola Petrov International	Plovdiv, Bulgaria
Win	39–23	(Kazakhstan) Adil Ospanov	6–3	8–11 April 2021	2021 Dan Kolov - Nikola Petrov International	Plovdiv, Bulgaria
Win	38–23	(Georgia (country)) Tornike Katamadze	TF 10–0	8–11 April 2021	2021 Dan Kolov - Nikola Petrov International	Plovdiv, Bulgaria
2021 Henri Deglane Grand Prix 5th at 65 kg
Win	37–23	(Spain) Juan Pablo González	TF 12–2	16 January 2021	Grand Prix de France Henri Deglane 2021	Nice, France
Loss	36–23	(United States) James Green	TF 0–11	16 January 2021	Grand Prix de France Henri Deglane 2021	Nice, France
Win	36–22	(Romania) Nikolai Okhlopkov	6–5	16 January 2021	Grand Prix de France Henri Deglane 2021	Nice, France
2020 Individual World Cup (bronze) at 61 kg
Win	35–22	(Armenia) Razmik Papikyan	5–2	12–18 December 2020	2020 Individual World Cup	Belgrade, Serbia
Loss	34–22	(Russia) Abasgadzhi Magomedov	0–7	12–18 December 2020	2020 Individual World Cup	Belgrade, Serbia
Win	34–21	(India) Rahul Aware	6–6	12–18 December 2020	2020 Individual World Cup	Belgrade, Serbia
Win	33–21	(Kyrgyzstan) Ulukbek Zholdoshbekov	Fall	12–18 December 2020	2020 Individual World Cup	Belgrade, Serbia
2020 Pan American Olympic Qualification (silver) at 65 kg
Loss	—N/a	(Cuba) Alejandro Valdes	FF	13–15 March 2020	2020 Pan American Olympic Qualification Tournament	Ottawa, Canada
Win	32–21	(United States) Zain Retherford	Fall	13–15 March 2020	2020 Pan American Olympic Qualification Tournament	Ottawa, Canada
Win	31–21	(Dominican Republic) Albaro Rudesindo Camacho	7–2	13–15 March 2020	2020 Pan American Olympic Qualification Tournament	Ottawa, Canada
2020 Pan American Championships (bronze) at 65 kg
Win	30–21	(Puerto Rico) Jose Rodriguez	TF 10–0	6–9 March 2020	2020 Pan American Continental Championships	Ottawa, Canada
Loss	29–21	(United States) Yianni Diakomihalis	4–7	6–9 March 2020	2020 Pan American Continental Championships	Ottawa, Canada
Win	29–20	(Canada) Vincent De Marinis	11–2	6–9 March 2020	2020 Pan American Continental Championships	Ottawa, Canada
Win	28–20	(Colombia) Uber Cuero	7–2	6–9 March 2020	2020 Pan American Continental Championships	Ottawa, Canada
2020 Matteo Pellicone Ranking Series 9th at 65 kg
Loss	27–20	(Ukraine) Erik Arushanian	Fall	15–18 January 2020	Matteo Pellicone Ranking Series 2020	Rome, Italy
Win	27–19	(Puerto Rico) Jose Rodriguez	6–2	15–18 January 2020	Matteo Pellicone Ranking Series 2020	Rome, Italy
2019 U23 World Championships 19th at 65 kg
Loss	26–19	(Hungary) Roman Asharin	TF 2–12	28 October – 3 November 2019	2019 U23 World Championships	Budapest, Hungary
2019 Pan American Games 5th at 65 kg
Loss	26–18	(United States) Jaydin Eierman	TF 4–15	9 August 2019	2019 Pan American Games	Lima, Peru
Loss	26–17	(Cuba) Alejandro Valdés	Fall	9 August 2019	2019 Pan American Games	Lima, Peru
Win	26–16	(Venezuela) Wilfredo Rodriguez	17–10	9 August 2019	2019 Pan American Games	Lima, Peru
2019 Pan American Championships (bronze) at 65 kg
Win	25–16	(Peru) Sixto Auccapiña	TF 16–5	18–19 April 2019	2019 Pan American Continental Championships	Buenos Aires, Argentina
Loss	24–16	(United States) Colton McCrystal	6–15	18–19 April 2019	2019 Pan American Continental Championships	Buenos Aires, Argentina
Win	24–15	(Colombia) Uber Cuero	4–2	18–19 April 2019	2019 Pan American Continental Championships	Buenos Aires, Argentina
Win	23–15	(Brazil) Marcos Wesley De Brito Siqueira	TF 10–0	18–19 April 2019	2019 Pan American Continental Championships	Buenos Aires, Argentina
2019 Dan Kolov & Nikola Petrov 20th at 65 kg
Loss	22–15	(United States) Bernard Futrell	0–8	28 February – 3 March 2019	2019 Dan Kolov - Nikola Petrov International	Ruse, Bulgaria
Loss	22–14	(United States) Jordan Oliver	3–3	28 February – 3 March 2019	2019 Dan Kolov - Nikola Petrov International	Ruse, Bulgaria
2019 Grand Prix de France Henri Deglane (bronze) at 65 kg
Win	22–13	(Romania) Stefan Coman	6–4	1–3 February 2019	Grand Prix de France Henri Deglane 2019	Nice, France
Loss	21–13	(Belarus) Niurgun Skriabin	TF 0–10	1–3 February 2019	Grand Prix de France Henri Deglane 2019	Nice, France
Win	21–12	(Poland) Patryk Olenczyn	TF 10–0	1–3 February 2019	Grand Prix de France Henri Deglane 2019	Nice, France
Win	20–12	(Poland) Viktar Shmuliai	Fall	1–3 February 2019	Grand Prix de France Henri Deglane 2019	Nice, France
2018 South American Games (silver) at 65 kg
Loss	19–12	(Venezuela) Anthony Montero	0–4	5–7 June 2018	2018 South American Games	Cochabamba, Bolivia
Win	19–11	(Bolivia) Fernando Espinoza	TF 10–0	5–7 June 2018	2018 South American Games	Cochabamba, Bolivia
Win	18–11	(Colombia) Uber Cuero	7–0	5–7 June 2018	2018 South American Games	Cochabamba, Bolivia
Win	17–11	(Peru) Sixto Auccapiña	Fall	5–7 June 2018	2018 South American Games	Cochabamba, Bolivia
Win	16–11	(Ecuador) Freddy Vera	TF 11–0	5–7 June 2018	2018 South American Games	Cochabamba, Bolivia
2018 Pan American Championships 7th at 65 kg
Loss	15–11	(Cuba) Alejandro Valdés	TF 0–10	3–6 May 2018	2018 Pan American Continental Championships	Lima, Peru
Win	15–10	(Dominican Republic) Joao Victor Dos Santos Silva	TF 10–0	3–6 May 2018	2018 Pan American Continental Championships	Lima, Peru
2017 Brazil Cup (silver) at 65 kg
Loss	14–10	(Colombia) Andres Castaneda	6–8	23–27 November 2017	2017 Brazil Cup	Rio de Janeiro, Brazil
Win	14–9	(Argentina) Lucas Pav	11–7	23–27 November 2017	2017 Brazil Cup	Rio de Janeiro, Brazil
Win	13–9	(Brazil) Carlos Murta	TF 10–0	23–27 November 2017	2017 Brazil Cup	Rio de Janeiro, Brazil
2017 South American Championships (gold) at 61 kg
Win	12–9	(Brazil) Marcos Oliveira	TF 10–0	22–23 November 2017	2017 South American Championships	Rio de Janeiro, Brazil
2017 Pan American Championships 6th at 61 kg
Loss	11–9	(United States) Logan Stieber	TF 4–16	5–7 May 2017	2017 Pan American Championships	Lauro de Freitas, Brazil
2017 Grand Prix de France Henri Deglane 7th at 61 kg
Loss	11–8	(Hungary) Jozsef Molnar	6–7	28–29 January 2017	Grand Prix de France Henri Deglane 2017	Paris, France
Win	11–7	(Italy) Salvatore Mannino	8–0	28–29 January 2017	Grand Prix de France Henri Deglane 2017	Paris, France
2016 South American Championships (gold) at 61 kg
Win	10–7	(Colombia) Uber Cuero		16–19 November 2016	2016 South American Championships	Cartagena, Colombia
Win	9–7	(Chile) Andre Quispe		16–19 November 2016	2016 South American Championships	Cartagena, Colombia
Win	8–7	(Venezuela) Jesus Viva		16–19 November 2016	2016 South American Championships	Cartagena, Colombia
2016 Pan American Olympic Qualification 5th at 57 kg
Loss	7–7	(Colombia) Uber Cuero	0–8	5 March 2016	2016 Pan American Olympic Qualification Tournament	(United States) Frisco, Texas
Loss	7–6	(Cuba) Yowlys Bonne	Fall	5 March 2016	2016 Pan American Olympic Qualification Tournament	(United States) Frisco, Texas
Win	7–5	(Chile) Andre Quispe	8–4	5 March 2016	2016 Pan American Olympic Qualification Tournament	(United States) Frisco, Texas
2016 Pan American Championships 4th at 57 kg
Loss	6–5	(Venezuela) Baron Andry Jose	11–14	26–28 February 2016	2016 Pan American Championships	(United States) Frisco, Texas
2016 Dan Kolov & Nikola Petrov 12th at 57 kg
Loss	6–4	(Poland) Ogonowski Tomasz	TF 3–13	29–31 January 2016	2016 Dan Kolov - Nikola Petrov International	Sofia, Bulgaria
2015 South American Championships (gold) at 57 kg
Win	6–3	(Peru) Samuel Alva		13–15 November 2015	2015 South American Championships	Buenos Aires, Argentina
Win	5–3	(Brazil) Carlos Fernandez		13–15 November 2015	2015 South American Championships	Buenos Aires, Argentina
Win	4–3	(Chile) Andre Quispe		13–15 November 2015	2015 South American Championships	Buenos Aires, Argentina
Win	3–3	(Bolivia) Marvin Chavez		13–15 November 2015	2015 South American Championships	Buenos Aires, Argentina
2015 Pan American Championships 7th at 57 kg
Loss	2–3	(Canada) Steven Takahashi	TF 0–10	24–26 April 2015	2015 Pan American Championships	Santiago, Chile
Win	2–2	(Dominican Republic) Juan Rubelín Ramírez	Fall	24–26 April 2015	2015 Pan American Championships	Santiago, Chile
2015 Dave Schultz M. International DNP at 57 kg
Loss	1–2	(United States) Stevan Mićić	TF 0–11	28–31 January 2015	2015 Dave Schultz Memorial International	(United States) Colorado Springs, Colorado
Win	1–1	(Canada) Dylan Bray	7–6	28–31 January 2015	2015 Dave Schultz Memorial International	(United States) Colorado Springs, Colorado
Loss	0–1	(United States) Joe Colon	Fall	28–31 January 2015	2015 Dave Schultz Memorial International	(United States) Colorado Springs, Colorado
