= Wrestling at the 2026 South American Games =

Wrestling competitions at the 2026 South American Games

- Venue: Rural Nave
- Dates: September 19–21

Wrestling competitions at the 2026 South American Games in Rosario, Santa Fe, and Rafaela, Argentina, were held between September 19 and 21 at Rural Nave, located within Parque de la Independencia in Rosario.

A total of 18 events was scheduled (twelve men and six women), but the men's freestyle 57 kg and the men's Greco-Roman 130 kg was dropped and 16 events was contested.

== Medal summary ==
=== Medal table ===
* Host nation (Argentina)

| Rank | Nation | Gold | Silver | Bronze | Total |
|---|---|---|---|---|---|
| 1 | Venezuela | 8 | 3 | 1 | 12 |
| 2 | Ecuador | 3 | 2 | 1 | 6 |
| 3 | Brazil | 2 | 3 | 6 | 11 |
| 4 | Argentina* | 2 | 1 | 3 | 6 |
| 5 | Colombia | 1 | 3 | 3 | 7 |
| 6 | Peru | 0 | 2 | 0 | 2 |
| 7 | Chile | 0 | 1 | 1 | 2 |
| 7 | Panama | 0 | 1 | 1 | 2 |
| 9 | Uruguay | 0 | 0 | 1 | 1 |
| Totals (9 entries) | | 16 | 16 | 17 | 49 |

=== Medalists ===
==== Men's freestyle ====
| Event | Gold | Silver | Bronze |
|---|---|---|---|
| 65 kg | Agustín Destribats; Argentina | Joshua Kramer; Ecuador | Wilfredo Rodríguez; Venezuela |
| 74 kg | Ibsen Aguilar; Venezuela | Sixto Auccapiña; Peru | Arbey Alarcón; Colombia |
| 86 kg | Pedro Gonçalves; Brazil | Ángel Cortés; Panama | Jorge Llano; Argentina |
| 97 kg | Cristián Sarco; Venezuela | Adrián Vasconcelos; Brazil | Ricardo Báez; Argentina |
| 125 kg | José Daniel Díaz; Venezuela | Gabriel Silva; Brazil | Mohammadreza Beykzadeh; Uruguay |

==== Men's Greco-Roman ====
| Event | Gold | Silver | Bronze |
|---|---|---|---|
| 60 kg | Raiber Rodríguez; Venezuela | Dicther Toro; Colombia | Pedro Rodrigues; Brazil |
| 67 kg | Andrés Montaño; Ecuador | Julián Horta; Colombia | Néstor Almanza; Chile |
| 77 kg | Arsen Julfalakyan; Argentina | Jair Cuero; Colombia | Joílson Júnior; Brazil |
| 87 kg | Luis Avendaño; Venezuela | Carlos Espinoza; Peru | André Pinto; Brazil |
| 97 kg | Luillys Pérez; Venezuela | Ricardo Gómez; Argentina | Jean Zambrano; Ecuador |

==== Women's freestyle ====
| Event | Gold | Silver | Bronze |
|---|---|---|---|
| 50 kg | Jacqueline Mollocana; Ecuador | Nohalis Loyo; Venezuela | Kamila Barbosa; Brazil |
| 53 kg | Lucía Yépez; Ecuador | Alexa Álvarez; Venezuela | Yusneiry Agrazal; Panama |
| 57 kg | Giullia Penalber; Brazil | Luisa Valverde; Ecuador | Paula Montoya; Colombia |
| 57 kg | Giullia Penalber; Brazil | Luisa Valverde; Ecuador | Camila Amarilla; Argentina |
| 62 kg | Astrid Montero; Venezuela | Laís Nunes; Brazil | Alexa Cuero; Colombia |
| 68 kg | Nathaly Grimán; Venezuela | Virginia Jiménez; Chile | Grabriela Rocha; Brazil |
| 76 kg | Tatiana Rentería; Colombia | María Acosta; Venezuela | Meiriele Hora; Brazil |

== Results ==
=== Men's freestyle 65 kg ===
Pool A

| Rank | Athlete | Nation | Pld | W | L | Pts | Qualification |
|---|---|---|---|---|---|---|---|
| 1 | Agustín Destribats | Argentina | 3 | 3 | 0 | 6 | Semifinals |
| 2 | Joshua Kramer | Ecuador | 3 | 2 | 1 | 4 | Semifinals |
| 3 | José David Benites | Peru | 3 | 1 | 2 | 2 | |
| 4 | Matías Muñoz | Chile | 3 | 0 | 3 | 0 | |

Pool B

| Rank | Athlete | Nation | Pld | W | L | Pts | Qualification |
|---|---|---|---|---|---|---|---|
| 1 | Wilfredo Rodríguez | Venezuela | 2 | 2 | 0 | 4 | Semifinals |
| 2 | Wilfredo López | Panama | 2 | 1 | 1 | 2 | Semifinals |
| 3 | Pablo Vera | Paraguay | 2 | 0 | 2 | '0 | |

Knockout stage

Semifinals
(Argentina) Agustín Destribats | 10
(Panama) Wilfredo López | 0
(Venezuela) Wilfredo Rodríguez | 4
(Ecuador) Joshua Kramer | 7

Final
(Argentina) Agustín Destribats | 10
(Ecuador) Joshua Kramer | 0
Bronze medal match
(Panama) Wilfredo López | 4
(Venezuela) Wilfredo Rodríguez | 14

=== Men's freestyle 74 kg ===
Pool A

| Rank | Athlete | Nation | Pld | W | L | Pts | Qualification |
|---|---|---|---|---|---|---|---|
| 1 | Ibsen Aguilar | Venezuela | 3 | 3 | 0 | 6 | Semifinals |
| 2 | Sixto Auccapiña | Peru | 3 | 1 | 2 | 2 | Semifinals |
| 3 | Daniel Olivera | Uruguay | 3 | 1 | 2 | 2 | |
| 4 | Jorge Gatica | Chile | 3 | 1 | 2 | 2 | |

Pool B

| Rank | Athlete | Nation | Pld | W | L | Pts | Qualification |
|---|---|---|---|---|---|---|---|
| 1 | Arbey Alarcón | Colombia | 2 | 2 | 0 | 4 | Semifinals |
| 2 | Arnoldo Proboste | Argentina | 2 | 1 | 1 | 2 | Semifinals |
| 3 | Pedro Alarcón | Bolivia | 2 | 0 | 2 | 0 | |

Knockout stage

Semifinals
1 | (Venezuela) Ibsen Aguilar | 10
4 | (Argentina) Arnoldo Proboste
3 | (Peru) Sixto Auccapiña | 2
2 | (Colombia) Arbey Alarcón | 1

Final
(Venezuela) Ibsen Aguilar | 6
(Peru) Sixto Auccapiña | 1
Bronze medal match
(Argentina) Arnoldo Proboste | 2
(Colombia) Arbey Alarcón | 2

=== Men's freestyle 86 kg ===
Pool A

| Rank | Athlete | Nation | Pld | W | L | Pts | Qualification |
|---|---|---|---|---|---|---|---|
| 1 | Ángel Cortés | Panama | 3 | 3 | 0 | 6 | Semifinals |
| 2 | Jorge Llano | Argentina | 3 | 2 | 1 | 4 | Semifinals |
| 3 | Jesús Landa | Peru | 3 | 1 | 2 | 2 | |
| 4 | Raymin Hosseini | Paraguay | 3 | 0 | 3 | 0 | |

Pool B

| Rank | Athlete | Nation | Pld | W | L | Pts | Qualification |
|---|---|---|---|---|---|---|---|
| 1 | Pedro Gonçalves | Brazil | 2 | 2 | 0 | 4 | Semifinals |
| 2 | Nestor Tafur | Colombia | 2 | 1 | 1 | 2 | Semifinals |
| 3 | José Piñero | Venezuela | 2 | 0 | 2 | 0 | |

Knockout stage

Semifinals
1 | (Panama) Ángel Cortés | 5
4 | (Colombia) Nestor Tafur | 0
3 | (Brazil) Pedro Gonçalves | 3
2 | (Argentina) Jorge Llano | 1

Final
(Panama) Ángel Cortés | 4
(Brazil) Pedro Gonçalves | 7
Bronze medal match
(Colombia) Nestor Tafur | 2
(Argentina) Jorge Llano | 4

=== Men's freestyle 97 kg ===
| Rank | Athlete | Nation |
|---|---|---|
| 1st place, gold medalist(s) | Cristián Sarco | Venezuela |
| 2nd place, silver medalist(s) | Adrián Vasconcelos | Brazil |
| 3rd place, bronze medalist(s) | Ricardo Báez | Argentina |
| 4 | Carlos Izquierdo | Colombia |
| 5 | Matías Uribe | Chile |

=== Men's freestyle 125 kg ===
| Rank | Athlete | Nation | Pld | W | L | Pts |
|---|---|---|---|---|---|---|
| 1st place, gold medalist(s) | José Daniel Díaz | Venezuela | 3 | 3 | 0 | 6 |
| 2nd place, silver medalist(s) | Gabriel Silva | Brazil | 3 | 2 | 1 | 4 |
| 3rd place, bronze medalist(s) | Mohammadreza Beykzadeh | Uruguay | 3 | 1 | 2 | 2 |
| 4 | Catriel Muriel | Argentina | 3 | 0 | 3 | 0 |

=== Men's greco-roman 60 kg ===
Pool A

| Rank | Athlete | Nation | Pld | W | L | Pts | Qualification |
|---|---|---|---|---|---|---|---|
| 1 | Raiber Rodríguez | Venezuela | 3 | 3 | 0 | 6 | Semifinals |
| 2 | Dicther Toro | Colombia | 3 | 2 | 1 | 4 | Semifinals |
| 3 | Augusto Vargas | Chile | 3 | 1 | 2 | 2 | |
| 4 | Robert Pérez | Panama | 3 | 0 | 3 | 0 | |

Pool B

| Rank | Athlete | Nation | Pld | W | L | Pts | Qualification |
|---|---|---|---|---|---|---|---|
| 1 | Pedro Rodrigues | Brazil | 2 | 2 | 0 | 4 | Semifinals |
| 2 | Patrick Rodríguez | Ecuador | 2 | 1 | 1 | 2 | Semifinals |
| 3 | Efraín Mamani | Bolivia | 2 | 0 | 2 | 0 | |

Knockout stage

Semifinals
1 | (Venezuela) Raiber Rodríguez | 10
4 | (Ecuador) Patrick Rodríguez | 2
3 | (Colombia) Dicther Toro | 10
2 | (Brazil) Pedro Rodrigues | 8

Final
(Venezuela) Raiber Rodríguez | 7
(Colombia) Dicther Toro | 2
Bronze medal match
(Ecuador) Patrick Rodríguez | 2
(Brazil) Pedro Rodrigues | 4

=== Men's greco-roman 67 kg ===
Pool A

| Rank | Athlete | Nation | Pld | W | L | Pts | Qualification |
|---|---|---|---|---|---|---|---|
| 1 | Andrés Montaño | Ecuador | 3 | 3 | 0 | 6 | Semifinals |
| 2 | Julián Horta | Colombia | 3 | 2 | 1 | 4 | Semifinals |
| 3 | Jonathan Bermúdez | Venezuela | 3 | 1 | 2 | 2 | |
| 4 | Nilton Soto | Peru | 3 | 0 | 3 | 0 | |

Pool B

| Rank | Athlete | Nation | Pld | W | L | Pts | Qualification |
|---|---|---|---|---|---|---|---|
| 1 | Néstor Almanza | Chile | 2 | 2 | 0 | 4 | Semifinals |
| 2 | Royglen Temple | Panama | 2 | 1 | 1 | 2 | Semifinals |
| 3 | Johan Sánchez | Bolivia | 2 | 0 | 2 | 0 | |

Knockout stage

Semifinals
1 | (Ecuador) Andrés Montaño | 6
4 | (Panama) Royglen Temple | 2
3 | (Colombia) Julián Horta | 3
2 | (Chile) Néstor Almanza | 1

Final
(Ecuador) Andrés Montaño | 3
(Colombia) Julián Horta | 3
Bronze medal match
(Panama) Royglen Temple | 0
(Chile) Néstor Almanza | 8

=== Men's greco-roman 77 kg ===
Pool A

| Rank | Athlete | Nation | Pld | W | L | Pts | Qualification |
|---|---|---|---|---|---|---|---|
| 1 | Jair Cuero | Colombia | 2 | 2 | 0 | 4 | Semifinals |
| 2 | Arsen Julfalakyan | Argentina | 2 | 1 | 1 | 2 | Semifinals |
| 3 | Ryan Cubas | Peru | 2 | 0 | 2 | 0 | |

Pool B

| Rank | Athlete | Nation | Pld | W | L | Pts | Qualification |
|---|---|---|---|---|---|---|---|
| 1 | Joilson de Brito | Brazil | 2 | 2 | 0 | 4 | Semifinals |
| 2 | Luis Medina | Venezuela | 2 | 1 | 1 | 2 | Semifinals |
| 3 | Eduardo Bernal | Chile | 2 | 0 | 2 | 0 | |

Knockout stage

Semifinals
1 | (Colombia) Jair Cuero | 3
4 | (Venezuela) Luis Medina | 1
3 | (Brazil) Joilson de Brito | 0
2 | (Argentina) Arsen Julfalakyan | 9

Final
(Colombia) Jair Cuero | 2
(Argentina) Arsen Julfalakyan | 4
Bronze medal match
(Venezuela) Luis Medina | 1
(Brazil) Joilson de Brito | 7

=== Men's greco-roman 87 kg ===
| Rank | Athlete | Nation | Pld | W | L | Pts |
|---|---|---|---|---|---|---|
| 1st place, gold medalist(s) | Luis Avendaño | Venezuela | 3 | 3 | 0 | 6 |
| 2nd place, silver medalist(s) | Carlos Espinoza | Peru | 3 | 2 | 1 | 4 |
| 3rd place, bronze medalist(s) | André Pinto | Brazil | 3 | 1 | 2 | 2 |
| 4 | Pablo Djamkotchian | Argentina | 3 | 0 | 3 | 0 |

=== Men's greco-roman 97 kg ===
| Rank | Athlete | Nation | Pld | W | L | Pts |
|---|---|---|---|---|---|---|
| 1st place, gold medalist(s) | Luillys Pérez | Venezuela | 4 | 4 | 0 | 8 |
| 2nd place, silver medalist(s) | Ricardo Gómez | Argentina | 4 | 3 | 1 | 6 |
| 3rd place, bronze medalist(s) | Jean Zambrano | Ecuador | 4 | 2 | 2 | 4 |
| 4 | Raphael Rodrigues | Brazil | 4 | 1 | 3 | 2 |
| 5 | Ricardo Cárdenas | Peru | 4 | 0 | 4 | 0 |

=== Women's freestyle 50 kg ===
Pool A

| Rank | Athlete | Nation | Pld | W | L | Pts | Qualification |
|---|---|---|---|---|---|---|---|
| 1 | Nohalis Loyo | Venezuela | 2 | 2 | 0 | 4 | Semifinals |
| 2 | Yorlenis Morán | Panama | 2 | 1 | 1 | 2 | Semifinals |
| 3 | Anett Huaman | Peru | 2 | 0 | 2 | 0 | |

Pool B

| Rank | Athlete | Nation | Pld | W | L | Pts | Qualification |
|---|---|---|---|---|---|---|---|
| 1 | Jacqueline Mollocana | Ecuador | 2 | 2 | 0 | 4 | Semifinals |
| 2 | Kamila Barbosa | Brazil | 2 | 1 | 1 | 2 | Semifinals |
| 3 | Alisson Cardozo | Colombia | 2 | 0 | 2 | 0 | |

Knockout stage

Semifinals
1 | (Venezuela) Nohalis Loyo | 4
4 | (Brazil) Kamila Barbosa | 1
3 | (Ecuador) Jacqueline Mollocana | 12
2 | (Panama) Yorlenis Morán | 2

Final
(Venezuela) Nohalis Loyo | 1
(Ecuador) Jacqueline Mollocana | 8
Bronze medal match
(Brazil) Kamila Barbosa | 7
(Panama) Yorlenis Morán | 6

=== Women's freestyle 53 kg ===
Pool A

| Rank | Athlete | Nation | Pld | W | L | Pts | Qualification |
|---|---|---|---|---|---|---|---|
| 1 | Lucía Yépez | Ecuador | 3 | 3 | 0 | 6 | Semifinals |
| 2 | Alexa Álvarez | Venezuela | 3 | 2 | 1 | 4 | Semifinals |
| 3 | Yusmy Chaparro | Colombia | 3 | 1 | 2 | 2 | |
| 4 | Wanessa Bandeira | Brazil | 3 | 0 | 3 | 0 | |

Pool B

| Rank | Athlete | Nation | Pld | W | L | Pts | Qualification |
|---|---|---|---|---|---|---|---|
| 1 | Antonia Valdés | Chile | 2 | 2 | 0 | 4 | Semifinals |
| 2 | Yusneiry Agrazal | Panama | 2 | 1 | 1 | 2 | Semifinals |
| 3 | Ana Álvarez | Peru | 2 | 0 | 2 | 0 | |

Knockout stage

Semifinals
1 | (Ecuador) Lucía Yépez | 4
4 | (Panama) Yusneiry Agrazal | 0
3 | (Venezuela) Alexa Álvarez | 10
2 | (Chile) Antonia Valdés | 0

Final
(Ecuador) Lucía Yépez | 10
(Venezuela) Alexa Álvarez | 0
Bronze medal match
(Panama) Yusneiry Agrazal | 10
(Chile) Antonia Valdés | 0

=== Women's freestyle 57 kg ===
Quartefinals
1 | (Colombia) Paula Montoya | 2
8 | (Venezuela) Yohelyn Valera | 1
4 | (Ecuador) Luisa Valverde | 8
5 | (Paraguay) Ingrid Rodríguez | 0
2 | (Argentina) Camila Amarilla | 10
7 | (Panama) Yajahira Ibarra | 0
3 | (Brazil) Giullia Rodrigues | 10
6 | (Peru) Martha Olivares | 0

Semifinals
(Colombia) Paula Montoya | 0
(Ecuador) Luisa Valverde | 7
(Argentina) Camila Amarilla | 0
(Brazil) Giullia Rodrigues | 4

Final
(Ecuador) Luisa Valverde | 0
(Brazil) Giullia Rodrigues | 4

Final stage

| Bronze medal match |
| (Paraguay) Ingrid Rodríguez | 0 |
| (Colombia) Paula Montoya | 10 |

| Bronze medal match |
| (Peru) Martha Olivares | 1 |
| (Argentina) Camila Amarilla | 4 |

=== Women's freestyle 62 kg ===
| Rank | Athlete | Nation | Pld | W | L | Pts |
|---|---|---|---|---|---|---|
| 1st place, gold medalist(s) | Astrid Montero | Venezuela | 3 | 3 | 0 | 6 |
| 2nd place, silver medalist(s) | Lais Nunes | Brazil | 3 | 2 | 1 | 4 |
| 3rd place, bronze medalist(s) | Alexa Cuero | Colombia | 3 | 1 | 2 | 2 |
| 4 | Ninfa Yupari | Bolivia | 3 | 0 | 3 | 0 |

=== Women's freestyle 68 kg ===
| Rank | Athlete | Nation | Pld | W | L | Pts |
|---|---|---|---|---|---|---|
| 1st place, gold medalist(s) | Nathaly Grimán | Venezuela | 4 | 4 | 0 | 8 |
| 2nd place, silver medalist(s) | Virginia Jiménez | Chile | 4 | 2 | 2 | 4 |
| 3rd place, bronze medalist(s) | Grabriela Rocha | Brazil | 4 | 2 | 2 | 4 |
| 4 | Nicoll Parrado | Colombia | 4 | 4 | 2 | 4 |
| 5 | Leyla Mallqui | Peru | 4 | 0 | 4 | 0 |

=== Women's freestyle 76 kg ===
| Rank | Athlete | Nation | Pld | W | L | Pts |
|---|---|---|---|---|---|---|
| 1st place, gold medalist(s) | Tatiana Rentería | Colombia | 4 | 4 | 0 | 8 |
| 2nd place, silver medalist(s) | María Acosta | Venezuela | 4 | 3 | 1 | 6 |
| 3rd place, bronze medalist(s) | Meiriele Hora | Brazil | 4 | 2 | 2 | 4 |
| 4 | Aomi Riques | Peru | 4 | 1 | 3 | 2 |
| 5 | Mahealani Ramírez | Uruguay | 4 | 0 | 4 | 0 |
