= Grand Prix de France Henri Deglane 2023 =

Henri Deglane Grand Prix 2023
- Host city: Nice, France
- Dates: 20–22 January 2023
- Stadium: Salle Serge Leyrit

Champions
- Freestyle: United States
- Greco-Roman: Ukraine
- Women: Germany

The XLIX Grand Prix de France Henri Deglane 2023 (also known as Grand Prix of France 2023 and Henri Deglane Grand Prix 2023) was a wrestling event held in Nice, France. It was held in the memory of 1924 Olympic Gold medalist Henri Deglane.

== Event videos ==
The event will air on the fflutte.sportall.tv channel.

Broadcasting
20 January 2022 Mat A	20 January 2022 Mat B
21 January 2022 Mat A	21 January 2022 Mat B
22 January 2022 Mat A	22 January 2022 Mat B

== Medal table ==
* Host nation (France)

Rank	Nation	Gold	Silver	Bronze	Total
1	United States	7	7	6	20
2	Ukraine	4	6	5	15
3	Georgia	4	3	4	11
4	Germany	3	4	12	19
5	France*	3	2	9	14
6	Cuba	2	0	0	2
7	Canada	1	2	2	5
8	Bulgaria	1	1	0	2
9	Nigeria	1	0	1	2
10	Kazakhstan	1	0	0	1
10	Latvia	1	0	0	1
12	Spain	0	1	1	2
13	Ecuador	0	1	0	1
13	Guinea-Bissau	0	1	0	1
15	Poland	0	0	4	4
15	Switzerland	0	0	4	4
17	Lithuania	0	0	2	2
18	Argentina	0	0	1	1
18	Brazil	0	0	1	1
18	Israel	0	0	1	1
Totals (20 entries)		28	28	53	109

=== Team ranking ===
Rank	Men's freestyle		Men's Greco-Roman		Women's freestyle	
Rank	Team	Points	Team	Points	Team	Points
1	United States	437	Ukraine	295	Germany	299
2	Germany	150	France	185	Canada	123
3	France	122	Georgia	148	France	113
4	Georgia	119	Lithuania	107	Poland	78
5	Spain	55	Switzerland	97	Spain	62
6	Argentina	49	Germany	90	Bulgaria	55
7	Poland	48	Poland	87	United States	54
8	Israel	47	Cuba	50	Nigeria	48
9	Canada	32	Latvia	25	Kazakhstan	25
10	Lithuania	23	Austria	18	Sweden	22

== Medal overview ==
=== Men's freestyle ===
Event	Gold	Silver	Bronze
57 kg	Nick Suriano; United States	Diamantino Iuna Fafé; Guinea-Bissau	Valentin Damour; France
57 kg	Nick Suriano; United States	Diamantino Iuna Fafé; Guinea-Bissau	Giorgi Gegelashvili; Georgia
61 kg	Austin DeSanto; United States	Shelton Mack; United States	Giorgi Goniashvili; Georgia
61 kg	Austin DeSanto; United States	Shelton Mack; United States	Nahshon Garrett; United States
65 kg	Pat Lugo; United States	Kizhan Clarke; Germany	Marwane Yezza; France
65 kg	Pat Lugo; United States	Kizhan Clarke; Germany	Ridge Lovett; United States
70 kg	Alec Pantaleo; United States	Giorgi Tcholadze; Georgia	Cody Chittum; United States
70 kg	Alec Pantaleo; United States	Giorgi Tcholadze; Georgia	Kevin Henkel; Germany
74 kg	Joey Lavallee; United States	Vincenzo Joseph; United States	Collin Purinton; United States
74 kg	Joey Lavallee; United States	Vincenzo Joseph; United States	Rasul Altemirov; France
79 kg	Evan Wick; United States	Alex Marinelli; United States	Taylor Lujan; United States
79 kg	Evan Wick; United States	Alex Marinelli; United States	Evsem Shvelidze; Georgia
86 kg	Ruslan Valiev; France	Taimuraz Friev; Spain	Akhmed Aibuev; France
86 kg	Ruslan Valiev; France	Taimuraz Friev; Spain	Uri Kalashnikov; Israel
92 kg	Eric Schultz Jr. United States	Jonathan Aiello; United States	Adlan Viskhanov; France
97 kg	Merab Suleimanishvili; Georgia	Morgan Patrick Smith; United States	Ilja Matuhin; Germany
97 kg	Merab Suleimanishvili; Georgia	Morgan Patrick Smith; United States	Lukas Krasauskas; Lithuania
125 kg	Nika Berulava; Georgia	Christian Lance; United States	Gennadij Cudinovic; Germany
125 kg	Nika Berulava; Georgia	Christian Lance; United States	Catriel Muriel; Argentina

=== Men's Greco-Roman ===
Event	Gold	Silver	Bronze
55 kg	Akaki Osiashvili; Georgia	Viacheslav Bairaktar; Ukraine	Koriun Sahradian; Ukraine
60 kg	Pridon Abuladze; Georgia	Viktor Petryk; Ukraine	Aywil Fouache; France
60 kg	Pridon Abuladze; Georgia	Viktor Petryk; Ukraine	Grzegorz Kunkel; Poland
63 kg	Aleksandrs Jurkjans; Latvia	Oleksandr Hrushyn; Ukraine	Léo Tudezca; France
63 kg	Aleksandrs Jurkjans; Latvia	Oleksandr Hrushyn; Ukraine	Mairbek Salimov; Poland
67 kg	Luis Orta; Cuba	Tigran Galustyan; France	Michael Portmann; Switzerland
67 kg	Luis Orta; Cuba	Tigran Galustyan; France	Parviz Nasibov; Ukraine
72 kg	Ibrahim Ghanim; France	Andrii Kulyk; Ukraine	Kamil Czarnecki; Poland
72 kg	Ibrahim Ghanim; France	Andrii Kulyk; Ukraine	Nika Korshia; Georgia
77 kg	Serhii Kozub; Ukraine	Volodymyr Yakovliev; Ukraine	Johnny Bur; France
77 kg	Serhii Kozub; Ukraine	Volodymyr Yakovliev; Ukraine	Deni Nakaev; Germany
82 kg	Yaroslav Filchakov; Ukraine	Dmytro Gardubei; Ukraine	Eric Löser; Germany
82 kg	Yaroslav Filchakov; Ukraine	Dmytro Gardubei; Ukraine	Marc Weber; Switzerland
87 kg	Zhan Beleniuk; Ukraine	Aivengo Rikadze; Georgia	Ramon Betschart; Switzerland
87 kg	Zhan Beleniuk; Ukraine	Aivengo Rikadze; Georgia	Damian von Euw; Switzerland
97 kg	Vladlen Kozlyuk; Ukraine	Giorgi Katsiashvili; Georgia	Sergei Omelin; Ukraine
97 kg	Vladlen Kozlyuk; Ukraine	Giorgi Katsiashvili; Georgia	Yevhenii Saveta; Ukraine
130 kg	Óscar Pino; Cuba	Franz Richter; Germany	Mykhailo Vyshnyvetskyi; Ukraine
130 kg	Óscar Pino; Cuba	Franz Richter; Germany	Mantas Knystautas; Lithuania

=== Women's freestyle ===
Event	Gold	Silver	Bronze
50 kg	Christianah Ogunsanya; Nigeria	Audrey Jimenez; United States	Julie Sabatié; France
50 kg	Christianah Ogunsanya; Nigeria	Audrey Jimenez; United States	Natalia Walczak; Poland
53 kg	Anastasia Blayvas; Germany	Karla Godinez; Canada	Annika Wendle; Germany
53 kg	Anastasia Blayvas; Germany	Karla Godinez; Canada	Nina Hemmer; Germany
57 kg	Elena Brugger; Germany	Luisa Valverde; Ecuador	Sandra Paruszewski; Germany
57 kg	Elena Brugger; Germany	Luisa Valverde; Ecuador	Tianna Kennett; Canada
62 kg	Ana Godinez; Canada	Mimi Hristova; Bulgaria	Esther Kolawole; Nigeria
62 kg	Ana Godinez; Canada	Mimi Hristova; Bulgaria	Laís Nunes; Brazil
65 kg	Taybe Yusein; Bulgaria	Gerda Barth; Germany	Chiara Hirt; Germany
65 kg	Taybe Yusein; Bulgaria	Gerda Barth; Germany	Nerea Pampín; Spain
68 kg	Koumba Larroque; France	Pauline Lecarpentier; France	Forrest Molinari; United States
68 kg	Koumba Larroque; France	Pauline Lecarpentier; France	Eyleen Sewina; Germany
72 kg	Lilly Schneider; Germany	Jennifer Rösler; Germany	Cassidy Richter; Germany
76 kg	Elmira Syzdykova; Kazakhstan	Justina Di Stasio; Canada	Taylor Follensbee; Canada
76 kg	Elmira Syzdykova; Kazakhstan	Justina Di Stasio; Canada	Francy Rädelt; Germany

== Results ==
Legend

- C — Won by 3 cautions given to the opponent
- F — Won by fall
- R — Retired
- WO — Won by walkover

=== Men's freestyle ===
==== Men's freestyle 57 kg ====
Round of 16
David Almendra (ARG)	1
Giorgi Gegelashvili (GEO)	11

Quarterfinals
Giorgi Gegelashvili (GEO)	WO
~~Tadeu Deus (ANG)~~
Valentin Damour (FRA)	0
Nick Suriano (USA)	9
Karamjeet Holstein (GER)	0
Diamantino Iuna Fafé (GBS)	10
Guesseppe Rea (ECU)	10
Akhil Vega (USA)	2

Semifinals
Giorgi Gegelashvili (GEO)	2
Nick Suriano (USA)	8
Diamantino Iuna Fafé (GBS)	11
Guesseppe Rea (ECU)	0

Final
Nick Suriano (USA)	10
Diamantino Iuna Fafé (GBS)	0

Repechage 2 of 4
David Almendra (ARG)	0
Valentin Damour (FRA)	10

Repechage 3 of 4
Valentin Damour (FRA)	WO
~~Tadeu Deus (ANG)~~
Akhil Vega (USA)	0
Karamjeet Holstein (GER)	10

Bronze medals
Valentin Damour (FRA)	12
Guesseppe Rea (ECU)	0
Karamjeet Holstein (GER)	1
Giorgi Gegelashvili (GEO)	11

==== Men's freestyle 61 kg ====
Round of 16
Adam Biboulatov (FRA)	1
Levan Metreveli (ESP)	5
Arman Eloyan (FRA)	1
Ibrahim Guzan (YEM)	5

Quarterfinals
Levan Metreveli (ESP)	0
Nahshon Garrett (USA)	10
Austin DeSanto (USA)	6
Giorgi Goniashvili (GEO)	3
Ibrahim Guzan (YEM)	0
Kye Mills (CAN)	5
Shelton Mack (USA)	6
Daniel Popov (ISR)	3

Semifinals
Nahshon Garrett (USA)	13
Austin DeSanto (USA)	14
Kye Mills (CAN)	0
Shelton Mack (USA)	12

Final
Austin DeSanto (USA)	5
Shelton Mack (USA)	4

Repechage 2 of 4
Adam Biboulatov (FRA)	4
Giorgi Goniashvili (GEO)	6
Arman Eloyan (FRA)
Daniel Popov (ISR)	WO

Repechage 3 of 4
Giorgi Goniashvili (GEO)	3
Levan Metreveli (ESP)	2
Daniel Popov (ISR)	WO
~~Ibrahim Guzan (YEM)~~

Bronze medals
Giorgi Goniashvili (GEO)	WO
Kye Mills (CAN)	0
Daniel Popov (ISR)	4
Nahshon Garrett (USA)	13

==== Men's freestyle 65 kg ====
Round of 32
	Score	
Mbundé Cumba (GBS)	0–10	Matthew Kolodzik (USA)
Carlos Álvarez (ESP)	WO	~~Antero Santos (ANG)~~
Agustín Destribats (ARG)	8–6	Anthony Ashnault (USA)
Quentin Sticker (FRA)	14–10	Josh Finesilver (ISR)

Round of 16
Matthew Kolodzik (USA)	10
Niklas Dorn (GER)	7
Marwane Yezza (FRA)	11
Moritz Langer (GER)	0
Carlos Álvarez (ESP)	2
Nico Megerle (GER)	8
Aminjon Sadulloev (POL)	0
Pat Lugo (USA)	8^{F}
Agustín Destribats (ARG)	10
Julien Zinser (GER)	0
Khamzat Arsamerzouev (FRA)	6
Evan Henderson (USA)	7
Quentin Sticker (FRA)	0
Kizhan Clarke (GER)	11
Nariman Serikbayev (KAZ)	4
Ridge Lovett (USA)	15

Quarterfinals
Matthew Kolodzik (USA)	10
Marwane Yezza (FRA)	0
Nico Megerle (GER)	3
Pat Lugo (USA)	4
Agustín Destribats (ARG)	12
Evan Henderson (USA)	7^{F}
Kizhan Clarke (GER)	4
Ridge Lovett (USA)	1

Semifinals
Matthew Kolodzik (USA)	2
Pat Lugo (USA)	6
Evan Henderson (USA)	8
Kizhan Clarke (GER)	10

Final
Pat Lugo (USA)	7
Kizhan Clarke (GER)	0

Repechage 2 of 6
~~Antero Santos (ANG)~~
Niklas Dorn (GER)	WO
~~Mbundé Cumba (GBS)~~
Carlos Álvarez (ESP)	WO
Josh Finesilver (ISR)	6
Julien Zinser (GER)	4
Anthony Ashnault (USA)	6
Quentin Sticker (FRA)	5

Repechage 3 of 6
Niklas Dorn (GER)	6
Moritz Langer (GER)	0
Carlos Álvarez (ESP)	14^{F}
Aminjon Sadulloev (POL)	1
Josh Finesilver (ISR)	3
Khamzat Arsamerzouev (FRA)	4
Anthony Ashnault (USA)	13
Nariman Serikbayev (KAZ)	3

Repechage 4 of 6
Niklas Dorn (GER)	3
Nico Megerle (GER)	0
Carlos Álvarez (ESP)	5
Marwane Yezza (FRA)	17
Khamzat Arsamerzouev (FRA)	3
Ridge Lovett (USA)	5
Anthony Ashnault (USA)	5
Agustín Destribats (ARG)	6

Repechage 5 of 6
Niklas Dorn (GER)	3
Marwane Yezza (FRA)	4
Ridge Lovett (USA)	8^{F}
Agustín Destribats (ARG)	2

Bronze medals
Marwane Yezza (FRA)	WO
~~Evan Henderson (USA)~~
Ridge Lovett (USA)	15
Matthew Kolodzik (USA)	12

==== Men's freestyle 70 kg ====
Quarterfinals		Semifinals		Final
Kevin Henkel (GER)	10
Cody Chittum (USA)	10	Kevin Henkel (GER)	4
Muhammad Abdurachmanov (BEL)	0	Giorgi Tcholadze (GEO)	5
Giorgi Tcholadze (GEO)	11			Giorgi Tcholadze (GEO)	1
Leon Gerstenberger (GER)	11			Alec Pantaleo (USA)	12
Mateusz Łuszczyński (POL)	0	Leon Gerstenberger (GER)	0
Alec Pantaleo (USA)	10	Alec Pantaleo (USA)	10
Arnaud Mambou (CGO)	0

Repechage 1 of 2
Cody Chittum (USA)	16
Muhammad Abdurachmanov (BEL)	5
Mateusz Łuszczyński (POL)	14
Arnaud Mambou (CGO)	4

Bronze medals
Cody Chittum (USA)	5
Leon Gerstenberger (GER)	1
Mateusz Łuszczyński (POL)	0
Kevin Henkel (GER)	10

==== Men's freestyle 74 kg ====
Round of 32
	Score	
Emmanuel Olapade (CAN)	1–5	Alan Golmohammadi (GER)
Raul Zarbaliev (ISR)	2–8	Stefan Käppeler (GER)
Jasmit Phulka (CAN)	4–1	Richard Schröder (GER)

Round of 16
Alan Golmohammadi (GER)	2
Saifedine Alekma (FRA)	10
Lautaro Seghesso (ARG)	0
Josh Shields (USA)	10
Stefan Käppeler (GER)	0
Joey Lavallee (USA)	11^{F}
Adam Kakhriev (FRA)	3
Szymon Wojtkowski (POL)	14
Jasmit Phulka (CAN)	0
Collin Purinton (USA)	10
Rasul Altemirov (FRA)	10
Wojciech Wysocki (POL)	0
Mitch Finesilver (ISR)	0
Vincenzo Joseph (USA)	6
Magamed Deliev (FRA)	4
Lucas Kahnt (GER)	5

Quarterfinals
Saifedine Alekma (FRA)	15
Josh Shields (USA)	1
Joey Lavallee (USA)	10
Szymon Wojtkowski (POL)	0
Collin Purinton (USA)	11
Rasul Altemirov (FRA)	9
Vincenzo Joseph (USA)	12
Lucas Kahnt (GER)	0

Semifinals
Saifedine Alekma (FRA)	4
Joey Lavallee (USA)	9^{F}
Collin Purinton (USA)	6
Vincenzo Joseph (USA)	16

Final
Joey Lavallee (USA)	5^{F}
Vincenzo Joseph (USA)	1

Repechage 2 of 6
Raul Zarbaliev (ISR)	0
Alan Golmohammadi (GER)	1^{R}
Emmanuel Olapade (CAN)	0
Stefan Käppeler (GER)	10
~~Richard Schröder (GER)~~
Mitch Finesilver (ISR)	WO

Repechage 3 of 6
Raul Zarbaliev (ISR)	11
Lautaro Seghesso (ARG)	1
Stefan Käppeler (GER)	11
Adam Kakhriev (FRA)	6
Jasmit Phulka (CAN)	10
Wojciech Wysocki (POL)	0
Mitch Finesilver (ISR)	6^{F}
Magamed Deliev (FRA)	0

Repechage 4 of 6
Raul Zarbaliev (ISR)	10
Szymon Wojtkowski (POL)	7
Stefan Käppeler (GER)	0
Josh Shields (USA)	5^{F}
Jasmit Phulka (CAN)	4
Lucas Kahnt (GER)	3
Mitch Finesilver (ISR)	6
Rasul Altemirov (FRA)	7

Repechage 5 of 6
Raul Zarbaliev (ISR)	0
Josh Shields (USA)	11^{F}
Jasmit Phulka (CAN)
Rasul Altemirov (FRA)	WO

Bronze medals
Josh Shields (USA)	10
Collin Purinton (USA)	14
Rasul Altemirov (FRA)	10
Saifedine Alekma (FRA)	0

==== Men's freestyle 79 kg ====
Round of 16
Callum McNeice (CAN)	0
Alex Marinelli (USA)	10
Kevin Spiegel (GER)	0
Taylor Lujan (USA)	10^{F}

Quarterfinals
Alex Marinelli (USA)	10
Gabriel Iglesias (ESP)	0
Marcel Käppeler (GER)	0
Evsem Shvelidze (GEO)	10
Taylor Lujan (USA)	15
Max Kasperovich (ISR)	5
Ansgar Reinke (GER)	3
Evan Wick (USA)	14

Semifinals
Alex Marinelli (USA)	3
Evsem Shvelidze (GEO)	2
Taylor Lujan (USA)	2
Evan Wick (USA)	6^{F}

Final
Alex Marinelli (USA)	5
Evan Wick (USA)	6

Repechage 2 of 4
Callum McNeice (CAN)	9
Marcel Käppeler (GER)	2
Kevin Spiegel (GER)	5
Ansgar Reinke (GER)	4

Repechage 3 of 4
Callum McNeice (CAN)	8
Gabriel Iglesias (ESP)	0
Kevin Spiegel (GER)	0
Max Kasperovich (ISR)	10

Bronze medals
Callum McNeice (CAN)	0
Taylor Lujan (USA)	11
Max Kasperovich (ISR)	0
Evsem Shvelidze (GEO)	10

==== Men's freestyle 86 kg ====
Round of 16
Taimuraz Friev (ESP)	7
Akhmed Aibuev (FRA)	3
Daviti Koguashvili (GEO)	7
Jorge Llano (ARG)	3
Andrew Johnson (CAN)	0
Ruslan Valiev (FRA)	10
Lars Schäfle (GER)	11
Filip Rogut (POL)	0

Quarterfinals
Taimuraz Friev (ESP)	3
Johannes Deml (GER)	0^{R}
Daviti Koguashvili (GEO)	7
Owen Webster (USA)	8
Ruslan Valiev (FRA)	2
Domantas Pauliuščenko (LTU)	1
Lars Schäfle (GER)	4
Uri Kalashnikov (ISR)	0

Semifinals
Taimuraz Friev (ESP)	6
Owen Webster (USA)	0
Ruslan Valiev (FRA)	5
Lars Schäfle (GER)	1

Final
Taimuraz Friev (ESP)
Ruslan Valiev (FRA)	WO

Repechage 2 of 4
Akhmed Aibuev (FRA)	9
Daviti Koguashvili (GEO)	8
Jorge Llano (ARG)	WO
Johannes Deml (GER)
Andrew Johnson (CAN)	0
Uri Kalashnikov (ISR)	6^{F}
Filip Rogut (POL)	2
Domantas Pauliuščenko (LTU)	12

Repechage 3 of 4
Akhmed Aibuev (FRA)	4
Jorge Llano (ARG)	0
Uri Kalashnikov (ISR)	8
Domantas Pauliuščenko (LTU)	0

Bronze medals
Akhmed Aibuev (FRA)	4
Lars Schäfle (GER)	1
Uri Kalashnikov (ISR)	6
Owen Webster (USA)	1

==== Men's freestyle 92 kg ====
Pos	Athlete	Pld	W	L	CP	TP	USA	USA	FRA	ESP
1	Eric Schultz Jr. (USA)	3	3	0	11	36	—	8–1	16–2	10–0
2	Jonathan Aiello (USA)	3	2	1	11	9	1–3 VPO1	—	2–4 Fall	6–0 Fall
3	Adlan Viskhanov (FRA)	3	1	2	4	17	1–4 VSU1	0–5 VFA	—	11–0
4	Aimar Alzón (ESP)	3	0	3	0	0	0–4 VSU	0–5 VFA	0–4 VSU	—

Source: UWW

==== Men's freestyle 97 kg ====
Pos	Athlete	Pld	W	L	CP	TP	LTU	GER	USA	ARG
1	Lukas Krasauskas (LTU)	3	2	1	9	8	—	5–2	WO	3–10
2	Ilja Matuhin (GER)	3	2	1	9	12	1–3 VPO1	—	WO	10–3
3	J'den Cox (USA)	3	1	2	4	11	0–5 VIN	0–5 VIN	—	11–0
4	Ricardo Báez (ARG)	3	1	2	4	13	3–1 VPO1	1–3 VPO1	0–4 VSU	—

Source: UWW

Pos	Athlete	Pld	W	L	CP	TP	GEO	USA	GER
1	Merab Suleimanishvili (GEO)	2	2	0	6	17	—	8–0	9–4
2	Morgan Smith (USA)	2	1	1	3	3	0–3 VPO	—	3–1
3	Johannes Mayer (GER)	2	0	2	2	5	1–3 VPO1	1–3 VPO1	—

Source: UWW

Semifinals		Final
Lukas Krasauskas (LTU)	4
Morgan Smith (USA)	8	Morgan Smith (USA)	0
Ilja Matuhin (GER)	0	Merab Suleimanishvili (GEO)	11
Merab Suleimanishvili (GEO)	7

==== Men's freestyle 125 kg ====
Pos	Athlete	Pld	W	L	CP	TP	GEO	GER	POL
1	Nika Berulava (GEO)	2	2	0	6	6	—	14–2	8–5
2	Gennadij Cudinovic (GER)	2	1	1	4	12	1–4 VSU1	—	4–0 Fall
3	Jakub Czerczak (POL)	2	0	2	1	6	1–3 VPO1	0–5 VFA	—

Source: UWW

Pos	Athlete	Pld	W	L	CP	TP	USA	ARG	POL
1	Christian Lance (USA)	2	2	0	8	15	—	5–6 Fall	11–0
2	Catriel Muriel (ARG)	2	1	1	4	12	0–5 VFA	—	4–0 Fall
3	Krzysztof Cieślak (POL)	2	0	2	2	4	0–4 VSU	0–5 VFA	—

Source: UWW

Semifinals		Final
Nika Berulava (GEO)	5^{F}
Catriel Muriel (ARG)	0	Nika Berulava (GEO)	6
Gennadij Cudinovic (GER)	1	Christian Lance (USA)	4
Christian Lance (USA)	5

=== Men's Greco-Roman ===
==== Men's Greco-Roman 55 kg ====
Pos	Athlete	Pld	W	L	CP	TP	GEO	UKR	UKR	FRA
1	Akaki Osiashvili (GEO)	3	2	1	8	0	—	7–11	3–1	12–3
2	Viacheslav Bairaktar (UKR)	3	2	1	7	20	3–1 VPO1	—	1–5	8–1
3	Koriun Sahradian (UKR)	3	2	1	7	13	1–3 VPO1	3–1 VPO1	—	7–1
4	Ilian Ainaoui (FRA)	3	0	3	3	5	1–4 VSU1	1–3 VPO1	1–3 VPO1	—

Source: UWW

==== Men's Greco-Roman 60 kg ====
Pos	Athlete	Pld	W	L	CP	TP	UKR	POL	FRA	ESP
1	Viktor Petryk (UKR)	3	3	0	13	23	—	9–0	5–0 Fall	9–0
2	Grzegorz Kunkel (POL)	3	1	2	5	6	0–4 VSU	—	3–3 Fall	3–0 Ret
3	Raymond Langlet (FRA)	3	1	2	3	9	0–5 VFA	0–5 VFA	—	6–0
4	Daniel Bobillo (ESP)	3	1	2	5	0	0–4 VSU	5–0 VIN	0–3 VPO	—

Source: UWW

Pos	Athlete	Pld	W	L	CP	TP	GEO	FRA	FRA
1	Pridon Abuladze (GEO)	2	2	0	8	17	—	9–1	8–0
2	Aywil Fouache (FRA)	2	1	1	4	7	1–4 VSU1	—	6–3
3	Jamal Valizadeh (FRA)	2	0	2	1	3	0–4 VSU	1–3 VPO1	—

Source: UWW

Semifinals		Final
Viktor Petryk (UKR)	12
Aywill Fouache (FRA)	0	Viktor Petryk (UKR)	1
Grzegorz Kunkel (POL)		Pridon Abuladze (GEO)	5
Pridon Abuladze (GEO)	WO

==== Men's Greco-Roman 63 kg ====
Pos	Athlete	Pld	W	L	CP	TP	LAT	UKR	LTU	GEO
1	Aleksandrs Jurkjans (LAT)	3	2	1	14	16	—	4–1 Fall	8–1	4–4
2	Oleksandr Hrushyn (UKR)	3	2	1	6	11	0–5 VFA	—	3–1	7–7
3	Justas Petravičius (LTU)	3	1	2	5	7	1–3 VPO1	1–3 VPO1	—	5–2
4	Beka Guruli (GEO)	3	1	2	5	13	3–1 VPO1	1–3 VPO1	1–3 VPO1	—

Source: UWW

Pos	Athlete	Pld	W	L	CP	TP	GEO	FRA	FRA
1	Mairbek Salimov (POL)	2	2	0	7	19	—	11–7	8–0
2	Léo Tudezca (FRA)	2	1	1	5	17	1–3 VPO1	—	10–2
3	Dorien Hutter (SUI)	2	0	2	1	2	0–4 VSU	1–4 VSU1	—

Source: UWW

Semifinals		Final
Aleksandrs Jurkjans (LAT)	10
Léo Tudezca (FRA)	2	Aleksandrs Jurkjans (LAT)	4
Oleksandr Hrushyn (UKR)	9	Oleksandr Hrushyn (UKR)	3
Mairbek Salimov (POL)	1

==== Men's Greco-Roman 67 kg ====
Round of 16
Luis Orta (CUB)	10
Michael Portmann (SUI)	5
Stefan Clément (FRA)	9^{F}
Levani Kavjaradze (GEO)	0
Magomed Gatagajev (FRA)	3
Adomas Grigaliūnas (LTU)	5
Mamadassa Sylla (FRA)	3
Parviz Nasibov (UKR)	5
Tigran Galustyan (FRA)	11
Piotr Stolarczyk (POL)	0
Yanis Nifri (FRA)	7
Shon Nadorgin (ISR)	1

Quarterfinals
Luis Orta (CUB)	6
Stefan Clément (FRA)	3
Adomas Grigaliūnas (LTU)	4^{F}
Marco Stoll (GER)	1
Parviz Nasibov (UKR)	2
Tigran Galustyan (FRA)	6
Yanis Nifri (FRA)	2
Andreas Vetsch (SUI)	3

Semifinals
Luis Orta (CUB)	11
Adomas Grigaliūnas (LTU)	0
Tigran Galustyan (FRA)	3
Andreas Vetsch (SUI)	3

Final
Luis Orta (CUB)	7
Tigran Galustyan (FRA)	2^{R}

Repechage 1 of 4
Michael Portmann (SUI)	10
Levani Kavjaradze (GEO)	0
Mamadassa Sylla (FRA)	8
Piotr Stolarczyk (POL)	0

Repechage 2 of 4
Michael Portmann (SUI)	10
Marco Stoll (GER)	1
Magomed Gatagajev (FRA)	3
Stefan Clément (FRA)	3
Mamadassa Sylla (FRA)	10
Yanis Nifri (FRA)	0
Shon Nadorgin (ISR)	0
Parviz Nasibov (UKR)	8

Repechage 3 of 4
Michael Portmann (SUI)	9
Stefan Clément (FRA)	1
Mamadassa Sylla (FRA)	7
Parviz Nasibov (UKR)	9

Bronze medals
Michael Portmann (SUI)	5
Andreas Vetsch (SUI)	1
Parviz Nasibov (UKR)	12
Adomas Grigaliūnas (LTU)	0

==== Men's Greco-Roman 72 kg ====
Round of 16
Nika Korshia (GEO)	8
Duncan Nelson (USA)	0
Piotr Lewandowski (POL)	5
Stefan Steigl (AUT)	13
Ibrahim Ghanem (FRA)	8
Rokas Čepauskas (LTU)	0
Andrii Kulyk (UKR)	9
Vilius Savickas (LTU)	0
Naïm Bolaky-Meïte (FRA)	3
Eimantas Vilimas (LTU)	7

Quarterfinals
Nika Korshia (GEO)	8
Stefan Steigl (AUT)	0
Ibrahim Ghanem (FRA)	5
Kamil Czarnecki (POL)	1
Andrii Kulyk (UKR)	9
Aleksander Mielewczyk (POL)	1
Eimantas Vilimas (LTU)	11
David Loher (SUI)	5

Semifinals
Nika Korshia (GEO)	1
Ibrahim Ghanem (FRA)	9
Andrii Kulyk (UKR)	8
Eimantas Vilimas (LTU)	0

Final
Ibrahim Ghanem (FRA)	3
Andrii Kulyk (UKR)	1

Repechage 1 of 4
Duncan Nelson (USA)	9
Piotr Lewandowski (POL)	0

Repechage 2 of 4
Duncan Nelson (USA)	0
Kamil Czarnecki (POL)	8
Rokas Čepauskas (LTU)	11
Stefan Steigl (AUT)	2
Vilius Savickas (LTU)	8
David Loher (SUI)	0
Naïm Bolaky-Meïte (FRA)	0
Aleksander Mielewczyk (POL)	9

Repechage 3 of 4
Kamil Czarnecki (POL)	13
Rokas Čepauskas (LTU)	4
Vilius Savickas (LTU)	2
Aleksander Mielewczyk (POL)	3

Bronze medals
Kamil Czarnecki (POL)	5
Eimantas Vilimas (LTU)	1
Aleksander Mielewczyk (POL)	0
Nika Korshia (GEO)	8

==== Men's Greco-Roman 77 kg ====
Round of 16
Volodymyr Yakovliev (UKR)	9
Fabio Dietsche (SUI)	0
Serhii Kozub (UKR)	9
Paulius Galkinas (LTU)	0

Quarterfinals
Volodymyr Yakovliev (UKR)	2^{F}
Gil Nugues (FRA)	3
Maksym Zakharchuk (POL)	0
Samuel Bellscheidt (GER)	5
Serhii Kozub (UKR)	13
Deni Nakaev (GER)	9
Johnny Bur (FRA)	13
Khvicha Ananidze (GEO)	9

Semifinals
Volodymyr Yakovliev (UKR)	9
Samuel Bellscheidt (GER)	0
Serhii Kozub (UKR)	8
Johnny Bur (FRA)	8

Final
Volodymyr Yakovliev (UKR)	3
Serhii Kozub (UKR)	6

Repechage 2 of 4
Fabio Dietsche (SUI)	5
Maksym Zakharchuk (POL)	1
Paulius Galkinas (LTU)	5
Khvicha Ananidze (GEO)	9

Repechage 3 of 4
Fabio Dietsche (SUI)	0
Gil Nugues (FRA)	9
Khvicha Ananidze (GEO)
Deni Nakaev (GER)	WO

Bronze medals
Gil Nugues (FRA)	0
Johnny Bur (FRA)	5
Deni Nakaev (GER)	7
Samuel Bellscheidt (GER)	0

==== Men's Greco-Roman 82 kg ====
Pos	Athlete	Pld	W	L	CP	TP	UKR	SUI	LTU
1	Dmytro Gardubei (UKR)	2	2	0	8	12	—	1–1	11–0
2	Marc Weber (SUI)	2	1	1	5	11	1–3 VPO1	—	10–2
3	Arsenas Stankevičius (LTU)	2	0	2	1	2	0–4 VSU	1–4 VSU1	—

Source: UWW

Pos	Athlete	Pld	W	L	CP	TP	UKR	GER	GEO
1	Yaroslav Filchakov (UKR)	2	2	0	6	13	—	6–0	7–1
2	Eric Löser (GER)	2	1	1	5	0	0–3 VPO	—	WO
3	Beka Mamukashvili (GEO)	2	0	2	1	1	1–3 VPO1	0–5 VIN	—

Source: UWW

Semifinals		Final
Yaroslav Filchakov (UKR)	9
Marc Weber (SUI)	0	Yaroslav Filchakov (UKR)	5
Eric Löser (GER)	3	Dmytro Gardubei (UKR)	1
Dmytro Gardubei (UKR)	7

==== Men's Greco-Roman 87 kg ====
Round of 16
Martynas Nemsevičius (LTU)	0
Aivengo Rikadze (GEO)	8

Quarterfinals
Aivengo Rikadze (GEO)	5^{F}
Adam Gardzioła (POL)	0
Damian von Euw (SUI)	7
Michael Wagner (AUT)	0
Ramon Betschart (SUI)	8
Tourpal Ali Magamadov (FRA)	4
Zhan Beleniuk (UKR)	5
Lukas Staudacher (AUT)	1

Semifinals
Aivengo Rikadze (GEO)	5
Damian von Euw (SUI)	1
Ramon Betschart (SUI)	1
Zhan Beleniuk (UKR)	10

Final
Aivengo Rikadze (GEO)	6
Zhan Beleniuk (UKR)	6

Repechage 2 of 4
Martynas Nemsevičius (LTU)	11
Michael Wagner (AUT)	0

Repechage 3 of 4
Martynas Nemsevičius (LTU)	5
Adam Gardzioła (POL)	12
Lukas Staudacher (AUT)	4
Tourpal Ali Magamadov (FRA)	3

Bronze medals
Adam Gardzioła (POL)	0
Ramon Betschart (SUI)	4^{F}
Lukas Staudacher (AUT)	3
Damian von Euw (SUI)	5

==== Men's Greco-Roman 97 kg ====
Round of 16
Jakub Antoszewski (POL)	1
Connor Sammet (GER)	1
Sergei Omelin (UKR)	5
Vilius Laurinaitis (LTU)	8
Hubert Robaszek (POL)	1
Loïc Samen (FRA)	5
Igor Shepetun (POL)	0
Patrick Neumaier (GER)	9
Giorgi Katsanashvili (GEO)	5
Mindaugas Venckaitis (LTU)	1

Quarterfinals
Connor Sammet (GER)	1
Vilius Laurinaitis (LTU)	6
Loïc Samen (FRA)	1
Vladen Kozlyuk (UKR)	9
Patrick Neumaier (GER)	7
Yevhenii Saveta (UKR)	0
Giorgi Katsanashvili (GEO)	1
Lucas Lazogianis (GER)	1

Semifinals
Vilius Laurinaitis (LTU)	1
Vladen Kozlyuk (UKR)	5
Patrick Neumaier (GER)	3
Giorgi Katsanashvili (GEO)	4

Final
Vladen Kozlyuk (UKR)	9^{F}
Giorgi Katsanashvili (GEO)	1

Repechage 1 of 4
Jakub Antoszewski (POL)	0
Sergei Omelin (UKR)	7

Repechage 2 of 4
Sergei Omelin (UKR)	1
Loïc Samen (FRA)	1
Hubert Robaszek (POL)	0
Connor Sammet (GER)	5^{F}
Igor Shepetun (POL)	0
Lucas Lazogianis (GER)	10
Mindaugas Venckaitis (LTU)	2
Yevhenii Saveta (UKR)	3

Repechage 3 of 4
Sergei Omelin (UKR)	2
Connor Sammet (GER)	1
Lucas Lazogianis (GER)	2
Yevhenii Saveta (UKR)	3

Bronze medals
Sergei Omelin (UKR)	1
Patrick Neumaier (GER)	1
Yevhenii Saveta (UKR)	3
Vilius Laurinaitis (LTU)	2

==== Men's Greco-Roman 130 kg ====
Quarterfinals		Semifinals		Final
Mantas Knystautas (LTU)	4^{F}
Mykhailo Vyshnyvetskyi (UKR)	0	Mantas Knystautas (LTU)	3
Franz Richter (GER)	12	Franz Richter (GER)	5
Catriel Muriel (ARG)	4			Franz Richter (GER)	0
Dominik Krawczyk (POL)	5			Óscar Pino (CUB)	5
Sulkhan Buidze (GEO)	0	Dominik Krawczyk (POL)	0
Óscar Pino (CUB)	9	Óscar Pino (CUB)	9
Nikolaos Ntounias (GRE)	0

Repechage 1 of 2
Mykhailo Vyshnyvetskyi (UKR)	12
Catriel Muriel (ARG)	1
Sulkhan Buidze (GEO)	7
Nikolaos Ntounias (GRE)	3

Bronze medals
Mykhailo Vyshnyvetskyi (UKR)	12
Dominik Krawczyk (POL)	2
Sulkhan Buidze (GEO)	5
Mantas Knystautas (LTU)	8

=== Women's freestyle ===
==== Women's freestyle 50 kg ====
Round of 16
Audrey Jimenez (USA)	10
Juliette Lescure (FRA)	0
Katie Dutchak (CAN)	13
Emma Luttenauer (FRA)	2
Aintzane Gorría (ESP)	4
Lola Jacquinot (FRA)	0
Emily Shilson (USA)	2
Julie Sabatié (FRA)	6
Amanda Tomczyk (POL)	6
Svenja Jungo (SUI)	5
Augusta Eve (CAN)	5
Charhazed Ayachi (FRA)	1

Quarterfinals
Audrey Jimenez (USA)	11
Katie Dutchak (CAN)	2
Aintzane Gorría (ESP)	10
Natalia Walczak (POL)	15^{F}
Julie Sabatié (FRA)	10
Amanda Tomczyk (POL)	0
Augusta Eve (CAN)	1
Christianah Ogunsanya (NGR)	11

Semifinals
Audrey Jimenez (USA)	13
Natalia Walczak (POL)	2
Julie Sabatié (FRA)	0
Christianah Ogunsanya (NGR)	10

Final
Audrey Jimenez (USA)	2
Christianah Ogunsanya (NGR)	7

Repechage 1 of 4
Juliette Lescure (FRA)	4
Emma Luttenauer (FRA)	8^{F}
Emily Shilson (USA)	6^{F}
Svenja Jungo (SUI)	0

Repechage 2 of 4
Emma Luttenauer (FRA)	10
Aintzane Gorría (ESP)	1
Lola Jacquinot (FRA)	0
Katie Dutchak (CAN)	8^{F}
~~Emily Shilson (USA)~~
Augusta Eve (CAN)	WO
Charhazed Ayachi (FRA)	1
Amanda Tomczyk (POL)	6

Repechage 3 of 4
Emma Luttenauer (FRA)	2^{F}
Katie Dutchak (CAN)	3
Augusta Eve (CAN)	3
Amanda Tomczyk (POL)	1

Bronze medals
Emma Luttenauer (FRA)	2
Julie Sabatié (FRA)	8
Augusta Eve (CAN)	2
Natalia Walczak (POL)	5

==== Women's freestyle 53 kg ====
Round of 16
Patricia Bermúdez (ARG)	6
Karla Godinez (CAN)	13
Lilya Cohen (FRA)	0
Nina Hemmer (GER)	8^{F}
Eva Ricquebourg-Elmi (FRA)	0
Rebekka March (GER)	8^{F}
Weronika Sikora (POL)	0
Annika Wendle (GER)	10^{F}
Laurie Lesaffre (FRA)	0
Amory Andrich (GER)	5
Joséphine Haemmerle (FRA)	2
Josefine Purschke (GER)	12
Chadia Ayachi (FRA)	0
Anastasia Blayvas (GER)	10

Quarterfinals
Karla Godinez (CAN)	4
Nina Hemmer (GER)	2
Rebekka March (GER)	0
Annika Wendle (GER)	6
Amory Andrich (GER)	WO
Josefine Purschke (GER)
Anastasia Blayvas (GER)	6^{F}
SueAnne Harms (CAN)	0

Semifinals
Karla Godinez (CAN)	3
Annika Wendle (GER)	3
Amory Andrich (GER)	0
Anastasia Blayvas (GER)	11

Final
Karla Godinez (CAN)	2
Anastasia Blayvas (GER)	2

Repechage 1 of 4
Patricia Bermúdez (ARG)	10
Lilya Cohen (FRA)	0
Eva Ricquebourg-Elmi (FRA)	0
Weronika Sikora (POL)	4^{F}
Laurie Lesaffre (FRA)	4^{F}
Joséphine Haemmerle (FRA)	4

Repechage 2 of 4
Patricia Bermúdez (ARG)	4
Rebekka March (GER)	0
Weronika Sikora (POL)	2
Nina Hemmer (GER)	6^{F}
Laurie Lesaffre (FRA)	5
SueAnne Harms (CAN)	8^{F}
Chadia Ayachi (FRA)	WO
Josefine Purschke (GER)

Repechage 3 of 4
Patricia Bermúdez (ARG)	2
Nina Hemmer (GER)	4^{F}
SueAnne Harms (CAN)	7^{F}
Chadia Ayachi (FRA)	6

Bronze medals
Nina Hemmer (GER)	2
Amory Andrich (GER)	1
SueAnne Harms (CAN)	2
Annika Wendle (GER)	7

==== Women's freestyle 57 kg ====
Round of 32
	Score	
Sandra Paruszewski (GER)	4–0	Victoria Báez (ESP)
Tianna Kennett (CAN)	8–2	Evelina Hulthén (SWE)
Elena Brugger (GER)	11–0	Laura Gómez (ESP)
Mercy Adekuoroye (NGR)	8–1	Camila Amarilla (ARG)
Marie Trayer (GER)	2–5	Graciela Sánchez (ESP)
Bose Samuel (NGR)	WO	Anna Michalcová (CZE)
Naemi Leistner (GER)	6–9	Nellie Florentin (SWE)
Céleste Sion (FRA)	4–4	Luisa Valverde (ECU)

Round of 16
Sandra Paruszewski (GER)	7^{F}
Mathilde Guédon (FRA)	0
Tianna Kennett (CAN)	3^{F}
Mathilde Rivière (FRA)	0
Elena Brugger (GER)	10
Romaïssa El Kharroubi (FRA)	0
Mercy Adekuoroye (NGR)	13
Wiktoria Karwowska (POL)	2
Graciela Sánchez (ESP)	0
Amel Rebiha (FRA)	6
Anna Michalcová (CZE)	4^{F}
Savannah Cosme (USA)	8
Nellie Florentin (SWE)	3
Mia Olivier (FRA)	1
Luisa Valverde (ECU)	8^{F}
Angelika Mytkowska (POL)	0

Quarterfinals
Sandra Paruszewski (GER)	11^{F}
Tianna Kennett (CAN)	0
Elena Brugger (GER)	4
Mercy Adekuoroye (NGR)	0
Amel Rebiha (FRA)	6
Anna Michalcová (CZE)	8^{F}
Nellie Florentin (SWE)	1
Luisa Valverde (ECU)	11

Semifinals
Sandra Paruszewski (GER)	1
Elena Brugger (GER)	2
Anna Michalcová (CZE)	0
Luisa Valverde (ECU)	6

Final
Elena Brugger (GER)	5
Luisa Valverde (ECU)	2

Repechage 2 of 6
Laura Gómez (ESP)	9^{F}
Mathilde Guédon (FRA)	2
Camila Amarilla (ARG)	WO
Mathilde Rivière (FRA)
Victoria Báez (ESP)	10
Romaïssa El Kharroubi (FRA)	0
Evelina Hulthén (SWE)	10
Wiktoria Karwowska (POL)	0
Naemi Leistner (GER)	2
Graciela Sánchez (ESP)	1
Céleste Sion (FRA)	3
Savannah Cosme (USA)	2
Marie Trayer (GER)	9
Mia Olivier (FRA)	6
Bose Samuel (NGR)
Angelika Mytkowska (POL)	WO

Repechage 3 of 6
Laura Gómez (ESP)	8^{F}
Camila Amarilla (ARG)	4
Victoria Báez (ESP)	6
Evelina Hulthén (SWE)	3
Naemi Leistner (GER)	2
Céleste Sion (FRA)	0
Marie Trayer (GER)	0
Angelika Mytkowska (POL)	2^{F}

Repechage 4 of 6
Laura Gómez (ESP)	2
Mercy Adekuoroye (NGR)	13
Victoria Báez (ESP)	1
Tianna Kennett (CAN)	9
Naemi Leistner (GER)	3
Nellie Florentin (SWE)	8
Angelika Mytkowska (POL)	2^{F}
Amel Rebiha (FRA)	8

Repechage 5 of 6
Mercy Adekuoroye (NGR)	1
Tianna Kennett (CAN)	8
Nellie Florentin (SWE)	0
Angelika Mytkowska (POL)	0

Bronze medals
Tianna Kennett (CAN)	10
Anna Michalcová (CZE)	0
Angelika Mytkowska (POL)	0
Sandra Paruszewski (GER)	6^{F}

==== Women's freestyle 62 kg ====
Round of 16
~~Welvina Vemba (ANG)~~
Iris Thiébaux (FRA)	WO
Johanna Lindborg (SWE)	10
Luisa Scheel (GER)	0
Ana Godinez (CAN)	14^{F}
Anne Nürnberger (GER)	4
Esther Kolawole (NGR)	10^{F}
Vanja Gersak-Perez (GER)	0
Paulina Danisz (POL)	0
Mimi Hristova (BUL)	10
Jennica Källberg (SWE)	8
Adelheid Przybylak (GER)	2
Lydia Pérez (ESP)	8^{F}
Luna Rothenberger (GER)	0
Laís Nunes (BRA)	2
Luisa Niemesch (GER)	3

Quarterfinals
Iris Thiébaux (FRA)	0
Johanna Lindborg (SWE)	10
Ana Godinez (CAN)	8
Esther Kolawole (NGR)	2
Mimi Hristova (BUL)	12
Jennica Källberg (SWE)	1
Lydia Pérez (ESP)	0
Luisa Niemesch (GER)	8

Semifinals
Johanna Lindborg (SWE)	2
Ana Godinez (CAN)	4
Mimi Hristova (BUL)	11
Luisa Niemesch (GER)	0

Final
Ana Godinez (CAN)	13
Mimi Hristova (BUL)	4

Repechage 1 of 4
~~Welvina Vemba (ANG)~~
Luisa Scheel (GER)	WO
Anne Nürnberger (GER)	4^{F}
Vanja Gersak-Perez (GER)	1
Paulina Danisz (POL)	4
Adelheid Przybylak (GER)	2
Luna Rothenberger (GER)	0
Laís Nunes (BRA)	10

Repechage 2 of 4
Luisa Scheel (GER)	0
Esther Kolawole (NGR)	12
Anne Nürnberger (GER)	10
Iris Thiébaux (FRA)	2
Paulina Danisz (POL)	0
Lydia Pérez (ESP)	10
Laís Nunes (BRA)	10
Jennica Källberg (SWE)	0

Repechage 3 of 4
Esther Kolawole (NGR)	6
Anne Nürnberger (GER)	1
Lydia Pérez (ESP)	2
Laís Nunes (BRA)	10

Bronze medals
Esther Kolawole (NGR)	6
Luisa Niemesch (GER)	3
Laís Nunes (BRA)	6
Johanna Lindborg (SWE)	2

==== Women's freestyle 65 kg ====
Pos	Athlete	Pld	W	L	CP	TP	BUL	GER	GER	NGR
1	Taybe Yusein (BUL)	3	3	0	13	14	—	7–0 Fall	7–0	WO
2	Gerda Barth (GER)	3	2	1	9	10	0–5 VFA	—	10–0	WO
3	Lena Rösler (GER)	3	1	2	5	0	0–3 VPO	0–4 VSU	—	WO
—	Sunmisola Balogun (NGR)	3	0	3	0	0	0–5 VFO	0–5 VFO	0–5 VFO	—

Source: UWW

Pos	Athlete	Pld	W	L	CP	TP	ESP	GER	POL
1	Nerea Pampín (ESP)	2	2	0	7	16	—	13–0	3–1
2	Chiara Hirt (GER)	2	1	1	5	6	0–4 VSU	—	6–0 Fall
3	Zuzanna Wólczyńska (POL)	2	0	2	1	1	1–3 VPO1	0–5 VFA	—

Source: UWW

Semifinals		Final
Taybe Yusein (BUL)	2^{F}
Chiara Hirt (GER)	0	Taybe Yusein (BUL)	11
Gerda Barth (GER)	6	Gerda Barth (GER)	0
Nerea Pampín (ESP)	3

==== Women's freestyle 68 kg ====
Round of 16
Lorena Lera (ESP)	5
Karolina Kozłowska (POL)	3
Marta Ojeda (ESP)	2
Zofia Polowczyk (POL)	12^{F}

Quarterfinals
Lorena Lera (ESP)	0
Sophia Schäfle (GER)	10
Sofiya Georgieva (BUL)	0
Koumba Larroque (FRA)	10
Zofia Polowczyk (POL)	0
Pauline Lecarpentier (FRA)	8^{F}
Eyleen Sewina (GER)	1
Forrest Molinari (USA)	11

Semifinals
Sophia Schäfle (GER)	0
Koumba Larroque (FRA)	6
Pauline Lecarpentier (FRA)	5
Forrest Molinari (USA)	3

Final
Koumba Larroque (FRA)	2
Pauline Lecarpentier (FRA)	1

Repechage 2 of 4
Karolina Kozłowska (POL)	0
Sofiya Georgieva (BUL)	11
Marta Ojeda (ESP)	4
Eyleen Sewina (GER)	11

Repechage 3 of 4
Sofiya Georgieva (BUL)	10
Lorena Lera (ESP)	0
Eyleen Sewina (GER)	6
Zofia Polowczyk (POL)	0

Bronze medals
Sofiya Georgieva (BUL)	1
Forrest Molinari (USA)	11^{F}
Eyleen Sewina (GER)	4^{F}
Sophia Schäfle (GER)	3

==== Women's freestyle 72 kg ====
Pos	Athlete	Pld	W	L	CP	TP	GER	GER	GER	FRA	POL
1	Lilly Schneider (GER)	4	4	0	15	27	—	3–0	10–0	9–0	5–0 Fall
2	Jennifer Rösler (GER)	4	3	1	10	21	0–3 VPO	—	5–2	10–0	6–4
3	Cassidy Richter (GER)	4	1	3	7	17	0–4 VSU	1–3 VPO1	—	9–2 Fall	6–8
4	Ambre Chevreau (FRA)	4	1	3	5	8	0–3 VPO	0–4 VSU	0–5 VFA	—	6–4 Fall
5	Patrycja Sperka (POL)	4	1	3	4	14	0–5 VFA	1–3 VPO1	3–1 VPO1	0–5 VFA	—

Source: UWW

==== Women's freestyle 76 kg ====
Pos	Athlete	Pld	W	L	CP	TP	KAZ	CAN	USA	GER
1	Elmira Syzdykova (KAZ)	3	3	0	14	20	—	6–0 Fall	4–8 Fall	10–0
2	Taylor Follensbee (CAN)	3	1	2	5	4	0–5 VFA	—	0–8 Fall	4–1 Fall
3	Kennedy Blades (USA)	3	1	2	5	16	0–5 VFA	5–0 VFA	—	WO
4	Laura Kühn (GER)	3	1	2	5	1	0–4 VSU	0–5 VFA	5–0 VIN	—

Source: UWW

Pos	Athlete	Pld	W	L	CP	TP	CAN	GER	ESP
1	Justina Di Stasio (CAN)	2	2	0	6	8	—	2–0	6–0
2	Francy Rädelt (GER)	2	1	1	4	11	0–3 VPO	—	11–0
3	Carla Lera (ESP)	2	0	2	0	0	0–3 VPO	0–4 VSU	—

Source: UWW

Semifinals		Final
Elmira Syzdykova (KAZ)	11
Francy Rädelt (GER)	1	Elmira Syzdykova (KAZ)	7
Taylor Follensbee (CAN)	4	Justina Di Stasio (CAN)	1
Justina Di Stasio (CAN)	4
