= Caleb Henson =

American wrestler (born 2001)

Personal information
- Born: December 7, 2001 (age 24) Cartersville, Georgia, U.S.
- Weight: 70 kg (150 lb)

Sport
- Country: United States
- Sport: Wrestling
- Events: Freestyle and Folkstyle
- College team: Virginia Tech
- Club: Southeast Regional Training Center
Medal record
Men's freestyle wrestling
Representing the United States
Grand Prix
Bronze medal – third place	New York City	70kg
Bronze medal – third place	2026 Zagreb	70 kg
Collegiate Wrestling
Representing the Nebraska Cornhuskers
NCAA Division I Championships
Gold medal – first place	2024 Kansas City	149 lb
Silver medal – second place	2025 Philadelphia	149 lb
ACC Championships
Gold medal – first place	2025 Durham	149 lb
Gold medal – first place	2023 Raleigh	149 lb
Silver medal – second place	2024 Chapel Hill	149 lb

Caleb Henson (born December 7) is an American freestyle and folkstyle wrestler who competes at 70 kilograms. Henson competed collegiately for Virginia Tech, where he captured the 2024 NCAA Title at 149 lb. Henson is a 3 time All- American and a two-time national finalist.

== Career ==
=== High School ===
Henson was born in Cartersville, Georgia. He attended Woodland High School, where he established himself as one of the most accomplished wrestlers in Georgia state history. Throughout his high school career, he won multiple state championships and earned national recognition through performances at premier tournaments including Super 32, Fargo, and other national-level competitions.

=== Virginia Tech ===
==== 2022-2023 ====
As a true freshman, Henson immediately entered Virginia Tech's starting lineup at 149 pounds. He quickly emerged as one of the nation's best wrestlers at the weight, winning the ACC Championship as a freshman and helping Virginia Tech qualify all ten starters for the NCAA Championships.

At the 2023 NCAA Division I Wrestling Championships, Henson earned All-American honors by placing fifth nationally. He became only the second true freshman in Virginia Tech wrestling history to earn All-American status. Henson concluded the season with a 27–5 record.

==== 2023-2024 ====
Entering his sophomore season ranked among the favorites at 149 pounds, Henson compiled one of the most successful seasons in Virginia Tech wrestling history. Throughout the regular season he defeated numerous ranked opponents and entered the NCAA Championships as the No. 4 seed.

At the 2024 NCAA Division I Wrestling Championships, Henson defeated Alek Martin, Jordan Williams, Ty Watters, top-seeded Ridge Lovett, and Austin Gomez to claim the national championship at 149 pounds. In the finals he defeated Gomez by a 15–7 major decision, recording the largest margin of victory among the championship matches.

The championship made Henson only the second NCAA wrestling champion in Virginia Tech history, joining Mekhi Lewis. He also became the first wrestler from Georgia ever to win an NCAA Division I wrestling title. Henson was also awarded the ACC Wrestler of the Year honors after capturing his national title.

==== 2024-2025 ====
Henson entered the season as the defending NCAA champion and the consensus No. 1 wrestler at 149 pounds. During the season he won the prestigious Cliff Keen Las Vegas Invitational, defeating multiple ranked opponents including Nebraska's Ridge Lovett and Oklahoma State's Carter Young.

Henson finished the regular season undefeated and captured his third ACC Championship. He was subsequently named ACC Wrestler of the Year for the second consecutive season.

At the 2025 NCAA Division I Men's Wrestling Championships, Henson advanced to his second consecutive NCAA final. He entered the championship bout with a 22–0 record before suffering his only loss of the season, falling 1–0 to Nebraska's Ridge Lovett in the national finals.

==== 2025-2026 ====
Henson redshirted the 2025–26 season, competing in freestyle events ahead of his final year of eligibility.

=== Freestyle ===
Henson opened his 2026 freestyle campaign during his redshirt season at the Bill Farrell Memorial Open. Henson captured bronze falling to Tyler Kasak while notably defeating Melvin Miller.

At the 2026 Zagreb Open Ranking Series in Zagreb, Croatia, competing at 70 kilograms. His tournament concluded with a third-place finish after a victory over former world champion Ismail Musukaev in the bronze-medal bout.

In an attempt to make the 2026 World Team at 70 kg, Henson finished second in both the US Open as well as the World Team Trials. Henson fell 12–14 to familiar foe Ridge Lovett in the finals of the US Open and fell in the finals of the World Team Trials to Zain Retherford 1–2.

== Freestyle record ==
Senior Freestyle Matches
Res.	Record	Opponent	Score	Date	Event	Location
2026 World Team Trials (silver) at 70 kg
Loss	16–7	(United States) Zain Retherford	1–2	May 15, 2026	2026 World Team Trials	(United States) Louisville, Kentucky
Win	16–6	(United States) Ed Scott	8–3	May 15, 2026	2026 World Team Trials	(United States) Louisville, Kentucky
Win	15–6	(United States) Ian Parker	10–4	May 15, 2026	2026 World Team Trials	(United States) Louisville, Kentucky
2026 US Open (silver) at 70 kg
Loss	14–6	(United States) Ridge Lovett	12–14	April 26, 2026	2026 US Open National Championships	(United States) Las Vegas, Nevada
Win	14–5	(United States) Tyler Kasak	INJ	April 26, 2026	2026 US Open National Championships	(United States) Las Vegas, Nevada
Win	13–5	(United States) Melvin Miller	7–3	April 26, 2026	2026 US Open National Championships	(United States) Las Vegas, Nevada
Win	12–5	(United States) Jordan Williams	11–4	April 26, 2026	2026 US Open National Championships	(United States) Las Vegas, Nevada
Win	11–5	(United States) Mitchel Hrnyak	TF 10–0	April 26, 2026	2026 US Open National Championships	(United States) Las Vegas, Nevada
2026 Grand Prix Zagreb Open (bronze) at 70 kg
Win	10–5	(Hungary) Ismail Musukaev	5–4	February 8, 2026	2026 Grand Prix Zagreb Open	Zagreb, Croatia
Loss	9–5	(Georgia (country)) Akaki Kemertelidze	4–6	February 8, 2026	2026 Grand Prix Zagreb Open	Zagreb, Croatia
Win	9–4	(Belarus) Muhamad Abdurachmanov	TF 11–1	February 8, 2026	2026 Grand Prix Zagreb Open	Zagreb, Croatia
Win	8–4	(Iran) Ebrahim Elahi	5–5	February 8, 2026	2026 Grand Prix Zagreb Open	Zagreb, Croatia
2025 Bill Farrell Memorial International (bronze) at 70 kg
Win	7–4	(United States) Ed Scott	11–10	November 8, 2025	2025 Bill Farrell Memorial International	(United States) New York City, New York
Win	6–4	(United States) Melvin Miller	8–6	November 8, 2025	2025 Bill Farrell Memorial International	(United States) New York City, New York
Loss	5–4	(United States) Tyler Kasak	3–6	November 8, 2025	2025 Bill Farrell Memorial International	(United States) New York City, New York
Win	5–3	(Kazakhstan) Auyez Seitbayev	TF 11–0	November 8, 2025	2025 Bill Farrell Memorial International	(United States) New York City, New York
2025 World Team Trials at 70 kg
Loss		(United States) Ian Parker	FF	May 16, 2025	2025 World Team Trials	(United States) Louisville, Kentucky
Loss	4–3	(United States) Bryce Andonian	2–3	May 16, 2025	2025 World Team Trials	(United States) Louisville, Kentucky
Win	4–2	(United States) James Green	5–5	May 16, 2025	2025 World Team Trials	(United States) Louisville, Kentucky
Win	3–2	(United States) Brayton Lee	4–4	May 16, 2025	2025 World Team Trials	(United States) Louisville, Kentucky
2023 US Open National Championships at 70 kg
Loss	2–2	(United States) Alec Pantaleo	TF 0–10	April 26, 2023	2023 US Open National Championships	(United States) Las Vegas, Nevada
Loss	2–1	(United States) Jaydin Eierman	5–11	April 26, 2023	2023 US Open National Championships	(United States) Las Vegas, Nevada
Win	2–0	(United States) Dayne Morton	TF 12–0	April 26, 2023	2023 US Open National Championships	(United States) Las Vegas, Nevada
Win	1–0	(United States) Garrett Bass	TF 10–0	April 26, 2023	2023 US Open National Championships	(United States) Las Vegas, Nevada
