= Islam Dudaev =

Albanian wrestler (born 1995)

Personal information
- Full name: Islam Lechiyevich Dudaev
- Nationality: Russian
- Born: Ислам Лечиевич Дудаев; 15 January 1995 (age 31) Khasavyurt, Dagestan, Russia
- Height: 172 cm (5 ft 8 in)

Sport
- Country: Russia (2017–2020); Albania (2022–present)
- Sport: Amateur wrestling
- Weight class: 61 kg
- Event: Freestyle
- Club: Umakhanov WC (им. Умаханова)
- Coached by: Magomed Guseinov

Achievements and titles
- World finals: 9th (2022)
- Regional finals: (bronze) (2022) (gold) (2024)
Medal record
Men's freestyle wrestling
Representing Albania
Olympic Games
Bronze medal – third place	2024 Paris	65 kg
European Championships
Gold medal – first place	2024 Bucharest	65 kg
Bronze medal – third place	2022 Budapest	65 kg
Mediterranean Games
Gold medal – first place	2026 Taranto	74 kg
Bronze medal – third place	2022 Oran	74 kg
Golden Grand Prix Ivan Yarygin
Bronze medal – third place	2022 Krasnoyarsk	65 kg
Dan Kolov & Nikola Petrov Tournament
Gold medal – first place	2022 Veliko Tarnovo	65 kg
Silver medal – second place	2023 Sofia	65 kg
Grand Prix
Gold medal – first place	2022 Tirana	70 kg
Gold medal – first place	2023 Tirana	65 kg
Bronze medal – third place	2023 Budapest	65 kg
Representing Russia
World U23 Championships
Bronze medal – third place	2017 Bydgoszcz	61 kg
Bronze medal – third place	2018 Bucharest	65 kg
Ali Aliyev Tournament
Gold medal – first place	2018 Kaspisk	65 kg
Alexander Medved Prizes
Gold medal – first place	2019 Minsk	65 kg
Bronze medal – third place	2018 Minsk	65 kg
Representing Chechnya
Russian National Championships
Bronze medal – third place	2017 Nazran	61 kg

Islam Lechiyevich Dudaev (Russian: Ислам Лечиевич Дудаев; born 15 January 1995) is a Russian-born Albanian wrestler. He won the gold medal in the men's freestyle 65 kg event at the 2024 European Wrestling Championships held in Bucharest, Romania.

== Career ==
In 2022, Dudaev won one of the bronze medals in the men's 65 kg event at the European Wrestling Championships held in Budapest, Hungary. He also won one of the bronze medals in the 74 kg event at the 2022 Mediterranean Games held in Oran, Algeria.

Dudaev won the gold medal in the men's 65 kg event at the 2024 European Wrestling Championships held in Bucharest, Romania. He competed at the 2024 European Wrestling Olympic Qualification Tournament in Baku, Azerbaijan hoping to qualify for the 2024 Summer Olympics in Paris, France. Dudaev was eliminated in his third match and he did not qualify for the Olympics. A month later, he earned a quota place for Albania for the Olympics at the 2024 World Wrestling Olympic Qualification Tournament held in Istanbul, Turkey.

On 22 August, the Minister of Physical Culture and Sports of the Chechnya Akhmat Kadyrov presented apartments to natives of the republic, the winner and bronze medalist of the Paris Olympics Razambek Zhamalov and Islam Dudaev.

== Achievements ==
Year	Tournament	Location	Result	Event
2022	European Championships	Budapest, Hungary	3rd	Freestyle 65 kg
2022	Mediterranean Games	Oran, Algeria	3rd	Freestyle 74 kg
2024	European Championships	Bucharest, Romania	1st	Freestyle 65 kg
2024	2024 Summer Olympics	Paris, France	3rd	Freestyle 65 kg
