= 2021 World Wrestling Championships – Men's freestyle 65 kg =

Wrestling competitions

Men's freestyle 65 kg at the 2021 World Championships
- Venue: Nye Jordal Amfi
- Dates: 3–4 October 2021
- Competitors: 27 from 27 nations

Medalists
gold medal	Zagir Shakhiev	RWF
silver medal	Amir Mohammad Yazdani	Iran
bronze medal	Alibek Osmonov	Kyrgyzstan
bronze medal	Tömör-Ochiryn Tulga	Mongolia

The men's freestyle 65 kilograms is a competition featured at the 2021 World Wrestling Championships, and was held in Oslo, Norway on 3 and 4 October.

This freestyle wrestling competition consists of a single-elimination tournament, with a repechage used to determine the winner of two bronze medals. The two finalists face off for gold and silver medals. Each wrestler who loses to one of the two finalists moves into the repechage, culminating in a pair of bronze medal matches featuring the semifinal losers each facing the remaining repechage opponent from their half of the bracket.

== Results ==
Legend

- F — Won by fall

=== Final ===
Final
Amir Mohammad Yazdani (IRI)	4
Zagir Shakhiev (RWF)	14

=== Top half ===
Round of 32
Sebastian Rivera (PUR)	14
Maxim Saculțan (MDA)	9
Gabriel Janatsch (AUT)	0
Amir Mohammad Yazdani (IRI)	10
Vasyl Shuptar (UKR)	8
Niurgun Skriabin (BLR)	1
Ali Rahimzade (AZE)	2
Yun Jun-sik (KOR)	3
Marwane Yezza (FRA)	0
Alibek Osmonov (KGZ)	11^{F}

Round of 16
Krzysztof Bieńkowski (POL)	1
Edemi Bolkvadze (GEO)	1
Sebastian Rivera (PUR)	3
Amir Mohammad Yazdani (IRI)	13
Vasyl Shuptar (UKR)	6
Yun Jun-sik (KOR)	0
Alibek Osmonov (KGZ)	12
Marcos Siqueira (BRA)	2

Quarterfinals
Krzysztof Bieńkowski (POL)	2
Amir Mohammad Yazdani (IRI)	4
Vasyl Shuptar (UKR)	3
Alibek Osmonov (KGZ)	5

Semifinals
Amir Mohammad Yazdani (IRI)	5
Alibek Osmonov (KGZ)	4

=== Bottom half ===
Round of 32
Rohit Singh (IND)	11
Charles Fernando (SRI)	0
Ayub Musaev (BEL)	0
Selahattin Kılıçsallayan (TUR)	7
Adil Ospanov (KAZ)	4
Haji Mohamad Ali (BRN)	9
Colin Realbuto (ITA)	0
Yianni Diakomihalis (USA)	10
Vazgen Tevanyan (ARM)	8
George Ramm (GBR)	0
Gilbert Kaboche (KEN)	0
Kaiki Yamaguchi (JPN)	10

Round of 16
Zagir Shakhiev (RWF)	5
Rohit Singh (IND)	4
Selahattin Kılıçsallayan (TUR)	4
Haji Mohamad Ali (BRN)	3
Yianni Diakomihalis (USA)	1
Vazgen Tevanyan (ARM)	5
Kaiki Yamaguchi (JPN)	2
Tömör-Ochiryn Tulga (MGL)	3

Quarterfinals
Zagir Shakhiev (RWF)	10
Selahattin Kılıçsallayan (TUR)	0
Vazgen Tevanyan (ARM)	1
Tömör-Ochiryn Tulga (MGL)	2

Semifinals
Zagir Shakhiev (RWF)	4
Tömör-Ochiryn Tulga (MGL)	4

=== Repechage ===
Repechage round 1
Gabriel Janatsch (AUT)	0
Sebastian Rivera (PUR)	10

Repechage round 2
Sebastian Rivera (PUR)	6
Krzysztof Bieńkowski (POL)	7
Rohit Singh (IND)	12
Selahattin Kılıçsallayan (TUR)	2

Bronze medals
Krzysztof Bieńkowski (POL)	1
Alibek Osmonov (KGZ)	4
Rohit Singh (IND)	4
Tömör-Ochiryn Tulga (MGL)	10^{F}

== Final standing ==
Rank	Athlete
1st place, gold medalist(s)	Zagir Shakhiev (RWF)
2nd place, silver medalist(s)	Amir Mohammad Yazdani (IRI)
3rd place, bronze medalist(s)	Alibek Osmonov (KGZ)
3rd place, bronze medalist(s)	Tömör-Ochiryn Tulga (MGL)
5	Krzysztof Bieńkowski (POL)
5	Rohit Singh (IND)
7	Sebastian Rivera (PUR)
8	Vasyl Shuptar (UKR)
9	Vazgen Tevanyan (ARM)
10	Selahattin Kılıçsallayan (TUR)
11	Kaiki Yamaguchi (JPN)
12	Yianni Diakomihalis (USA)
13	Haji Mohamad Ali (BRN)
14	Yun Jun-sik (KOR)
15	Maxim Saculțan (MDA)
16	Adil Ospanov (KAZ)
17	Ali Rahimzade (AZE)
18	Marcos Siqueira (BRA)
19	Edemi Bolkvadze (GEO)
20	Niurgun Skriabin (BLR)
21	Ayub Musaev (BEL)
22	George Ramm (GBR)
23	Colin Realbuto (ITA)
24	Gilbert Kaboche (KEN)
25	Marwane Yezza (FRA)
26	Charles Fernando (SRI)
27	Gabriel Janatsch (AUT)
