= 2020 European Wrestling Championships – Men's freestyle 65 kg =

Wrestling competition

The men's freestyle 65 kg is a competition featured at the 2020 European Wrestling Championships, and was held in Rome, Italy on February 14 and February 15.

== Medalists ==
Gold	Kurban Shiraev; Russia
Silver	Niurgun Skriabin; Belarus
Bronze	Ali Rahimzade; Azerbaijan
Bronze	Erik Arushanian; Ukraine

== Results ==
Legend

- F — Won by fall

=== Final ===
Final
Niurgun Skriabin (BLR)	0
Kurban Shiraev (RUS)	5

=== Top half ===
Round of 32

Round of 16
Maxim Saculțan (MDA)	2
Niurgun Skriabin (BLR)	4^{F}
Selahattin Kılıçsallayan (TUR)	1
Iszmail Muszukajev (HUN)	8
Abdellatif Mansour (ITA)	1
George Bucur (ROU)	12
Ali Rahimzade (AZE)	7
Vladimer Khinchegashvili (GEO)	0

Quarterfinals
Niurgun Skriabin (BLR)	12
Iszmail Muszukajev (HUN)	1
George Bucur (ROU)	2
Ali Rahimzade (AZE)	3

Semifinals
Niurgun Skriabin (BLR)	5
Ali Rahimzade (AZE)	1

=== Bottom half ===
Round of 32
Niklas Dorn (GER)	12
Gabriel Janatsch (AUT)	1
George Ramm (GBR)	3
Krzysztof Bieńkowski (POL)	9
David Habat (SLO)	1
Valodya Frangulyan (ARM)	3
Juan Pablo González (ESP)	2
Stefan Ivanov (BUL)	6
Erik Arushanian (UKR)	10
Fotios Papadakis (GRE)	0

Round of 16
Kurban Shiraev (RUS)	10
Marwane Yezza (FRA)	0
Malik Amine (SMR)	5
Niklas Dorn (GER)	6
Krzysztof Bieńkowski (POL)	4
Valodya Frangulyan (ARM)	1
Stefan Ivanov (BUL)	6
Erik Arushanian (UKR)	16

Quarterfinals
Kurban Shiraev (RUS)	6
Niklas Dorn (GER)	3
Krzysztof Bieńkowski (POL)	0
Erik Arushanian (UKR)	10

Semifinals
Kurban Shiraev (RUS)	9
Erik Arushanian (UKR)	2

=== Repechage ===
Repechage round 2
Maxim Saculțan (MDA)	4
Iszmail Muszukajev (HUN)	8
Marwane Yezza (FRA)	3
Niklas Dorn (GER)	2

Bronze medal match
Iszmail Muszukajev (HUN)	2
Ali Rahimzade (AZE)	2
Marwane Yezza (FRA)	6
Erik Arushanian (UKR)	11^{F}

== Final standing ==
Rank	Athlete
1st place, gold medalist(s)	Kurban Shiraev (RUS)
2nd place, silver medalist(s)	Niurgun Skriabin (BLR)
3rd place, bronze medalist(s)	Ali Rahimzade (AZE)
3rd place, bronze medalist(s)	Erik Arushanian (UKR)
5	Iszmail Muszukajev (HUN)
5	Marwane Yezza (FRA)
7	Niklas Dorn (GER)
8	Krzysztof Bieńkowski (POL)
9	George Bucur (ROU)
10	Stefan Ivanov (BUL)
11	Valodya Frangulyan (MDA)
12	Maxim Saculțan (MDA)
13	Malik Amine (SMR)
14	George Ramm (GBR)
15	Juan Pablo González (ESP)
16	David Habat (SLO)
17	Selahattin Kılıçsallayan (TUR)
18	Abdellatif Mansour (ITA)
19	Gabriel Janatsch (AUT)
20	Vladimer Khinchegashvili (GEO)
21	Fotios Papadakis (GRE)
