= 2023 European Wrestling Championships – Men's freestyle 65 kg =

Wrestling competition

Men's freestyle 65 kg at the 2023 European Wrestling Championships
- Venue: Arena Zagreb
- Location: Zagreb, Croatia
- Dates: 17-18 April
- Competitors: 18

Medalists
| gold medal | Vazgen Tevanyan | Armenia |
| silver medal | Mikyay Naim | Bulgaria |
| bronze medal | Erik Arushanian | Ukraine |
| bronze medal | Edemi Bolkvadze | Georgia |

The Men's Freestyle 65 kg is a competition featured at the 2023 European Wrestling Championships, and was held in Zagreb, Croatia on April 17 and 18.

== Results ==
Legend

- F — Won by fall

=== Final ===
| Final |
| Vazgen Tevanyan (ARM) | 12 |
| Mikyay Naim (BUL) | 1 |

=== Top half ===
Round of 32
Georgios Pilidis (GRE) | 0
Islam Dudaev (ALB) | 5

Round of 16
Vazgen Tevanyan (ARM) | 10
Josh Finesilver (ISR) | 0
Islam Dudaev (ALB) | 2
Ali Rahimzade (AZE) | 5
Colin Realbuto (ITA) | 0
Andre Clarke (GER) | 3
Maxim Saculțan (MDA) | 3
Erik Arushanian (UKR) | 6

Quarterfinals
Vazgen Tevanyan (ARM) | 4
Ali Rahimzade (AZE) | 1
Andre Clarke (GER) | 2
Erik Arushanian (UKR) | 2

Semifinals
Vazgen Tevanyan (ARM) | 12
Erik Arushanian (UKR) | 4

=== Bottom half ===
Round of 32
Stevan Mićić (SRB) | 11
Carlos Álvarez (ESP) | 0

Round of 16
Edemi Bolkvadze (GEO) | 4
Hamza Alaca (TUR) | 3
Mikyay Naim (BUL) | 10
Nino Leutert (SUI) | 3
Khamzat Arsamerzouev (FRA) | 8
Stevan Mićić (SRB) | 4
Ștefan Coman (ROU) | 4
Krzysztof Bieńkowski (POL) | 2

Quarterfinals
Edemi Bolkvadze (GEO) | 2
Mikyay Naim (BUL) | 6
Khamzat Arsamerzouev (FRA) | 3
Ștefan Coman (ROU) | 3

Semifinals
Mikyay Naim (BUL) | 7
Ștefan Coman (ROU) | 0

Repechage round 1
Josh Finesilver (ISR) | 0
Ali Rahimzade (AZE) | 7
Nino Leutert (SUI) | 0
Edemi Bolkvadze (GEO) | 6

Bronze medal match
Ali Rahimzade (AZE) | 6
Erik Arushanian (UKR) | 7
Edemi Bolkvadze (GEO) | 2
Ștefan Coman (ROU) | 2

== Final standing ==
| Rank | Athlete |
|---|---|
| 1st place, gold medalist(s) | Vazgen Tevanyan (ARM) |
| 2nd place, silver medalist(s) | Mikyay Naim (BUL) |
| 3rd place, bronze medalist(s) | Erik Arushanian (UKR) |
| 3rd place, bronze medalist(s) | Edemi Bolkvadze (GEO) |
| 5 | Ali Rahimzada (AZE) |
| 5 | Ștefan Coman (ROU) |
| 7 | Stevan Mićić (SRB) |
| 8 | Khamzat Arsamerzouev (FRA) |
| 9 | Islam Dudaev (ALB) |
| 10 | Andre Clarke (GER) |
| 11 | Hamza Alaca (TUR) |
| 12 | Maxim Saculțan (MDA) |
| 13 | Nino Leutert (SUI) |
| 14 | Krzysztof Bieńkowski (POL) |
| 15 | Colin Realbuto (ITA) |
| 16 | Georgios Pilidis (GRE) |
| 17 | Carlos Álvarez (ESP) |
| 18 | Josh Finesilver (ISR) |
