= 2019 European Wrestling Championships – Men's freestyle 65 kg =

The men's freestyle 65 kg is a competition featured at the 2019 European Wrestling Championships, and was held in Bucharest, Romania on April 8 and April 9.

== Medalists ==
Gold	Haji Aliyev; Azerbaijan
Silver	Selahattin Kılıçsallayan; Turkey
Bronze	Vasyl Shuptar; Ukraine
Bronze	Nachyn Kuular; Russia

== Results ==
Legend

- F — Won by fall
- WO — Won by walkover

=== Final ===
Final
Selahattin Kılıçsallayan (TUR)	0
Haji Aliyev (AZE)	7

=== Top half ===
Round of 32

Round of 16
Abdellatif Mansour (ITA)	11
Malik Amine (SMR)	8
Vasyl Shuptar (UKR)	4
Juan Pablo González (ESP)	0
Krzysztof Bieńkowski (POL)	13
Gabriel Janatsch (AUT)	2
Eriglent Prizreni (ALB)	2
Selahattin Kılıçsallayan (TUR)	12

Quarterfinals
Abdellatif Mansour (ITA)	0
Vasyl Shuptar (UKR)	10
Krzysztof Bieńkowski (POL)	1
Selahattin Kılıçsallayan (TUR)	7

Semifinals
Vasyl Shuptar (UKR)	6
Selahattin Kılıçsallayan (TUR)	9

=== Bottom half ===
Round of 32
József Molnár (HUN)	5
Fati Vejseli (NMK)	4
Ilman Mukhtarov (FRA)	6
Niklas Dorn (GER)	0
David Habat (SLO)	10
Masoud Niazi (NED)	0
Daniel Chomanič (SVK)	0
Vladimer Khinchegashvili (GEO)	10
Nachyn Kuular (RUS)	6
George Bucur (ROU)	0
Husein Shakhbanau (BLR)	2
Haji Aliyev (AZE)	7
George Ramm (GBR)	0
Vazgen Tevanyan (ARM)	10

Round of 16
Maxim Saculțan (MDA)	7
József Molnár (HUN)	3
Ilman Mukhtarov (FRA)	1
David Habat (SLO)	1
Vladimer Khinchegashvili (GEO)	4
Nachyn Kuular (RUS)	9
Haji Aliyev (AZE)	1
Vazgen Tevanyan (ARM)	0

Quarterfinals
Maxim Saculțan (MDA)	3
Ilman Mukhtarov (FRA)	1
Nachyn Kuular (RUS)	3
Haji Aliyev (AZE)	5

Semifinals
Maxim Saculțan (MDA)	2
Haji Aliyev (AZE)	12

=== Repechage ===
Repechage round 1
Husein Shakhbanau (BLR)	WO
Vazgen Tevanyan (ARM)

Repechage round 2
Eriglent Prizreni (ALB)	1
Krzysztof Bieńkowski (POL)	3
Husein Shakhbanau (BLR)	2
Nachyn Kuular (RUS)	4

Bronze medal match
Krzysztof Bieńkowski (POL)	0
Vasyl Shuptar (UKR)	4^{F}
Nachyn Kuular (RUS)	4
Maxim Saculțan (MDA)	0
