= Nachyn Kuular =

Russian wrestler (born 1995)

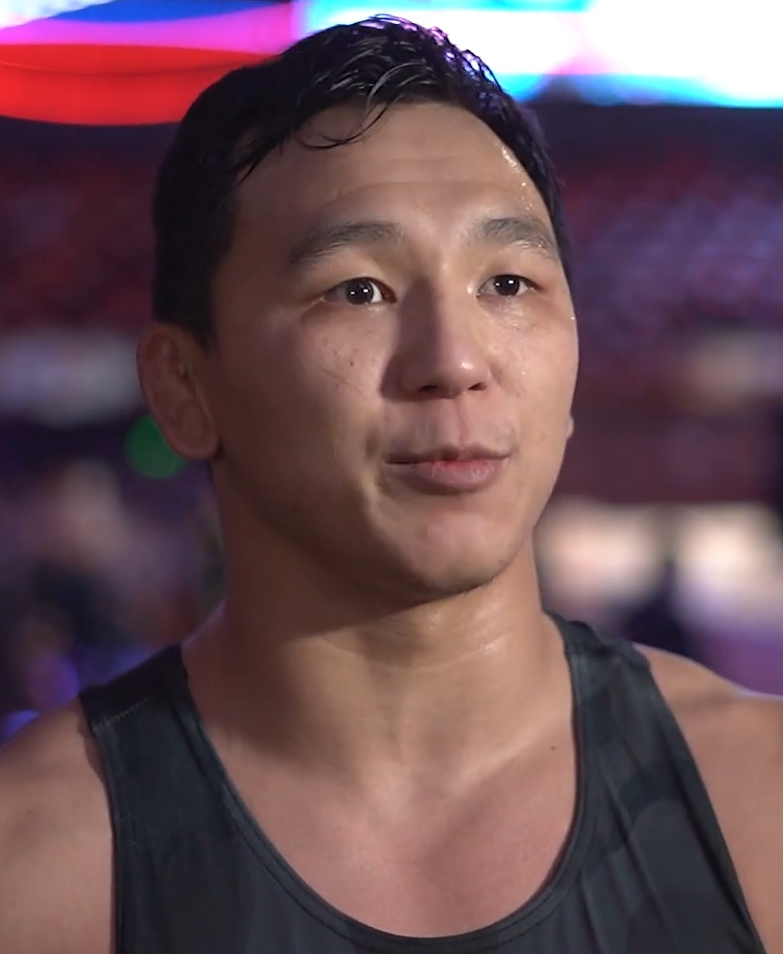
- Kuular in 2020

Personal information
- Native name: Начын Сергеевич Куулар
- Full name: Nachyn Sergeyevich Kuular
- Born: 9 June 1995 (age 31) Kyzyl, Tuva, Russia
- Height: 1.67 m (5 ft 6 in)

Sport
- Country: Russia; Kazakhstan (since 2024)
- Sport: Wrestling
- Weight class: 65 kg
- Event: Freestyle
- Club: Mindiashvili wrestling academy (formally); Tuva WC
- Coached by: Aidan Samdan, Sergey Khachikyan, Amurkhan Bitarov

Achievements and titles
- Regional finals: (bronze) (2019) (bronze) (2026)
Medal record
Men's freestyle wrestling
Representing Kazakhstan
Asian Games
| Bronze medal – third place | 2026 Aichi–Nagoya | 65 kg |
Yasar Dogu Tournament
| Silver medal – second place | 2025 Kocaeli | 70 kg |
Grand Prix
| Bronze medal – third place | 2026 Budapest | 65 kg |
Representing Russia
European Championships
| Bronze medal – third place | 2019 Bucharest | 65 kg |
U23 World Championships
| Gold medal – first place | 2017 Bydgoszcz | 65 kg |
U23 European Championships
| Gold medal – first place | 2018 Istanbul | 65 kg |
Junior European Championships
| Gold medal – first place | 2015 Istanbul | 60 kg |
World Military Championships
| Gold medal – first place | 2018 Moscow | 65 kg |
| Gold medal – first place | 2017 Klaipėda | 65 kg |
| Gold medal – first place | 2016 Skopje | 61 kg |
| Silver medal – second place | 2021 Tehran | 70 kg |
Representing Tuva
Russian National Championships
| Silver medal – second place | 2019 Sochi | 65 kg |
| Bronze medal – third place | 2018 Odintsovo | 65 kg |
| Bronze medal – third place | 2017 Nazran | 65 kg |
Golden Grand Prix Ivan Yarygin
| Silver medal – second place | 2019 Krasnoyarsk | 65 kg |
| Silver medal – second place | 2015 Krasnoyarsk | 61 kg |
| Bronze medal – third place | 2020 Krasnoyarsk | 65 kg |
| Bronze medal – third place | 2018 Krasnoyarsk | 65 kg |

Nachyn Sergeyevich Kuular (Russian: Начын Сергеевич Куулар, Tuvan: Начын Сергей оглу Куулар; born 9 June 1995) is a Russian breakdancer and freestyle wrestler who represents Kazakhstan on the international circuit.

== Career ==
=== Background ===
Kuular was born 9 June 1995 in Kyzyl, Russia. Nachyn started practising wrestling at the age of 7 under his first wrestling coach Aidan Samdan. He is four-times champion at Tuva regional freestyle wrestling championships.

=== High school years ===
In 2013 he finished the Russian junior nationals 13th, then he competed at Russian senior nationals 2013, finishing there 28th. After high school he joined Mindiashvili's wrestling academy and won the Siberian Federal District freestyle wrestling championships at 60 kilos.

=== College/Senior years ===
In 2015, Kuular won the Junior European championships at 60 kilos, in the final match beating Selim Kozan of Turkey by technical superiority (13–2). After failing to qualify for the Olympics he won the Russian U23 World Team Trials, then he competed at the U23 World Championships where he won gold by defeating Indian World senior bronze medalist Bajrang Punia.

In 2016 he began studying at the Tuvan State University.

At the Golden Grand Prix Ivan Yarygin 2018 he won the bronze medal with 4–1 record at 65 kilos.

In 2024, he started represting Kazakhstan. At the Kazakhstan national championships, he finished in the 3rd place.

== Freestyle record ==
Senior Freestyle International Matches
| Res. | Record | Opponent | Score | Date | Event | Location |
2021 Russian Nationals DNP at 65 kg
| Loss | 65–14 | (Chechnya) Akhmed Chakaev | 0–3 | March 11–14, 2021 | 2021 Russian National Freestyle Wrestling Championships | Ulan-Ude, Russia |
| Win | 65–13 | (Russia) Artur Badtiev | 9–3 | March 11–14, 2021 | 2021 Russian National Freestyle Wrestling Championships | Ulan-Ude, Russia |
2020 Ivan Yarygin Grand Prix (bronze) at 65 kg
| Win | 64–13 | (Mongolia) Nyamdorj Battulga | 4–1 | January 23–26, 2020 | 2020 Ivan Yarygin Golden Grand Prix | Krasnoyarsk, Russia |
| Loss | 63–13 | (Dagestan) Kurban Shiraev | 1–1 | January 23–26, 2020 | 2020 Ivan Yarygin Golden Grand Prix | Krasnoyarsk, Russia |
| Win | 63–12 | (Chechnya) Akhmed Chakaev | 9–4 | January 23–26, 2020 | 2020 Ivan Yarygin Golden Grand Prix | Krasnoyarsk, Russia |
| Win | 62–12 | (Mongolia) Baatarkhuu Usukhbayar | 2–0 | January 23–26, 2020 | 2020 Ivan Yarygin Golden Grand Prix | Krasnoyarsk, Russia |
| Win | 61–12 | (Mongolia) Munkh Erdene Altansuvd | TF 11–0 | January 23–26, 2020 | 2020 Ivan Yarygin Golden Grand Prix | Krasnoyarsk, Russia |
2019 Alrosa Cup (silver) at 65 kg
| Loss | 60–12 | (Azerbaijan) Haji Aliyev | 4–5 | November 29–30, 2019 | 2019 Alrosa Team Cup | Moscow, Russia |
| Win | 60–11 | (Guinea-Bissau) Kumba Mbunde | | November 29–30, 2019 | 2019 Alrosa Team Cup | Moscow, Russia |
2019 Russian Nationals (silver) at 65 kg
| Loss | 59–11 | (Dagestan) Gadzhimurad Rashidov | 2–5 | July 5–7, 2019 | 2019 Russian National Freestyle Wrestling Championships | Sochi, Russia |
| Win | 59–10 | (Chechnya) Dzhokhar Dudayev | 4–3 | July 5–7, 2019 | 2019 Russian National Freestyle Wrestling Championships | Sochi, Russia |
| Win | 58–10 | (Chechnya) Muslim Sadulaev | 12–3 | July 5–7, 2019 | 2019 Russian National Freestyle Wrestling Championships | Sochi, Russia |
| Win | 57–10 | (Irkutsk Oblast) Yulian Gergenov | 2–1 | July 5–7, 2019 | 2019 Russian National Freestyle Wrestling Championships | Sochi, Russia |
| Win | 56–10 | (Dagestan) Khizri Jamaludinov | FF | July 5–7, 2019 | 2019 Russian National Freestyle Wrestling Championships | Sochi, Russia |
2019 European Championships (bronze) at 65 kg
| Win | 55–10 | (Moldova) Maxim Saculțan | 4–0 | April 8–9, 2019 | 2019 European Continental Championships | Bucharest, Romania |
| Win | 54–10 | (Belarus) Husein Shakhbanau | 4–2 | April 8–9, 2019 | 2019 European Continental Championships | Bucharest, Romania |
| Loss | 53–10 | (Azerbaijan) Haji Aliyev | 3–5 | April 8–9, 2019 | 2019 European Continental Championships | Bucharest, Romania |
| Win | 53–9 | (Georgia (country)) Vladimer Khinchegashvili | 9–4 | April 8–9, 2019 | 2019 European Continental Championships | Bucharest, Romania |
| Win | 52–9 | (Romania) George Bucur | 6–0 | April 8–9, 2019 | 2019 European Continental Championships | Bucharest, Romania |
2019 Ivan Yarygin Golden Grand Prix (silver) at 65 kg
| Loss | 51–9 | (Chechnya) Akhmed Chakaev | 1–2 | January 24–27, 2019 | Golden Grand Prix Ivan Yarygin 2019 | Krasnoyarsk, Russia |
| Win | 51–8 | (Mongolia) Tömör-Ochiryn Tulga | 6–0 | January 24–27, 2019 | Golden Grand Prix Ivan Yarygin 2019 | Krasnoyarsk, Russia |
| Win | 50–8 | (Mongolia) Batmagnai Batchuluun | 11–9 | January 24–27, 2019 | Golden Grand Prix Ivan Yarygin 2019 | Krasnoyarsk, Russia |
| Win | 49–8 | (Romania) Ivan Guidea | TF 14–2 | January 24–27, 2019 | Golden Grand Prix Ivan Yarygin 2019 | Krasnoyarsk, Russia |
2018 Alans International (bronze) at 65 kg
| Win | 48–8 | (Russia) Artur Badtiev | 6–2 | December 7–9, 2018 | 2018 Alans International | Vladikavkaz, Russia |
| Win | 47–8 | (Tajikistan) Viktor Rassadin | 4–1 | December 7–9, 2018 | 2018 Alans International | Vladikavkaz, Russia |
| Loss | 46–8 | (Russia) Kurban Shiraev | 1–6 | December 7–9, 2018 | 2018 Alans International | Vladikavkaz, Russia |
| Win | 46–7 | (Georgia (country)) Vladimer Khinchegashvili | DQ (12–6) | December 7–9, 2018 | 2018 Alans International | Vladikavkaz, Russia |
2018 Alrosa Cup (silver) as Team RUS at 65 kg
| Win | 45–7 | (Iran) Peiman Biabani | 5–0 | December 2, 2018 | 2018 Alrosa Team Cup | Moscow, Russia |
| Win | 44–7 | (Georgia (country)) Amiran Vakhtangashvili | 10–2 | December 2, 2018 | 2018 Alrosa Team Cup | Moscow, Russia |
2018 Russian Nationals (bronze) at 65 kg
| Win | 43–7 | (Sakha Republic) Dyulustan Bulatov | 5–0 | August 3–5, 2018 | 2018 Russian National Freestyle Wrestling Championships | Odintsovo, Russia |
| Loss | 42–7 | (Dagestan) Bekkhan Goygereyev | 1–3 | August 3–5, 2018 | 2018 Russian National Freestyle Wrestling Championships | Odintsovo, Russia |
| Win | 42–6 | (Russia) | | August 3–5, 2018 | 2018 Russian National Freestyle Wrestling Championships | Odintsovo, Russia |
| Win | 41–6 | (Moscow) Akhmedkhan Dzaliev | 5–0 | August 3–5, 2018 | 2018 Russian National Freestyle Wrestling Championships | Odintsovo, Russia |
| Win | 40–6 | (Tajikistan) Viktor Rassadin | 6–2 | August 3–5, 2018 | 2018 Russian National Freestyle Wrestling Championships | Odintsovo, Russia |
2018 U23 European Championships (gold) at 65 kg
| Win | 39–6 | (Azerbaijan) Anvarbek Dalgatov | TF 11–0 | June 4–10, 2018 | 2018 U23 European Championships | Istanbul, Turkey |
| Win | 38–6 | (Turkey) Utku Dogan | TF 14–2 | June 4–10, 2018 | 2018 U23 European Championships | Istanbul, Turkey |
| Win | 37–6 | (Romania) Evgheni Volcov | TF 13–2 | June 4–10, 2018 | 2018 U23 European Championships | Istanbul, Turkey |
| Win | 36–6 | (France) Ilman Mukhtarov | 8–3 | June 4–10, 2018 | 2018 U23 European Championships | Istanbul, Turkey |
2018 Military World Championships (gold) at 65 kg
| Win | 35–6 | (South Korea) Hyeon Song | Fall | May 14–20, 2018 | 2018 Military World Championships | Moscow, Russia |
| Win | 34–6 | (Iran) Peiman Biabani | 4–4 | May 14–20, 2018 | 2018 Military World Championships | Moscow, Russia |
| Win | 33–6 | (Azerbaijan) Aghahuseyn Mustafayev | 6–4 | May 14–20, 2018 | 2018 Military World Championships | Moscow, Russia |
| Win | 32–6 | (Germany) Kevin Henkel | 13–5 | May 14–20, 2018 | 2018 Military World Championships | Moscow, Russia |
2018 Ivan Yarygin Golden Grand Prix (bronze) at 65 kg
| Win | 31–6 | (Mongolia) Batmagnai Batchuluun | TF 12–2 | January 27, 2018 | Golden Grand Prix Ivan Yarygin 2018 | Krasnoyarsk, Russia |
| Win | 30–6 | (United States) Logan Stieber | 10–4 | January 27, 2018 | Golden Grand Prix Ivan Yarygin 2018 | Krasnoyarsk, Russia |
| Loss | 29–6 | (Dagestan) Ilyas Bekbulatov | 5–12 | January 27, 2018 | Golden Grand Prix Ivan Yarygin 2018 | Krasnoyarsk, Russia |
| Win | 29–5 | (Georgia (country)) Edemi Bolkvadze | TF 10–0 | January 27, 2018 | Golden Grand Prix Ivan Yarygin 2018 | Krasnoyarsk, Russia |
| Win | 28–5 | (United States) Josh Kindig | TF 12–1 | January 27, 2018 | Golden Grand Prix Ivan Yarygin 2018 | Krasnoyarsk, Russia |
2017 U23 World Championships (gold) at 65 kg
| Win | 27–5 | (India) Bajrang Punia | TF 17–6 | November 21–26, 2017 | 2017 U23 World Championships | Bydgoszcz, Poland |
| Win | 26–5 | (Belarus) Heorhi Kaliyeu | 5-3 | November 21–26, 2017 | 2017 U23 World Championships | Bydgoszcz, Poland |
| Win | 25–5 | (Mongolia) Tömör-Ochiryn Tulga | TF 14–4 | November 21–26, 2017 | 2017 U23 World Championships | Bydgoszcz, Poland |
| Win | 24–5 | (United States) Joseph McKenna | TF 10–0 | November 21–26, 2017 | 2017 U23 World Championships | Bydgoszcz, Poland |
| Win | 23–5 | (Moldova) Maxim Saculțan | 2–1 | November 21–26, 2017 | 2017 U23 World Championships | Bydgoszcz, Poland |
2017 Yugra Cup (silver) at 65 kg
| Loss | 22–5 | (Tajikistan) Viktor Rassadin | TF 0–11 | October 28–29, 2017 | 2017 Yugra Cup – Vladimir Semenov Memorial | Nefteyugansk, Russia |
| Win | 22–4 | (Russia) Elbrus Bolotaev | 10–3 | October 28–29, 2017 | 2017 Yugra Cup – Vladimir Semenov Memorial | Nefteyugansk, Russia |
| Win | 21–4 | (Russia) Abdula Akhmedov | 11–3 | October 28–29, 2017 | 2017 Yugra Cup – Vladimir Semenov Memorial | Nefteyugansk, Russia |
| Win | 20–4 | (Russia) Ildar Shakurov | TF 15–3 | October 28–29, 2017 | 2017 Yugra Cup – Vladimir Semenov Memorial | Nefteyugansk, Russia |
2017 Military World Championships (gold) at 65 kg
| Win | 19–4 | (Romania) George Bucur | TF 12–1 | September 20–23, 2017 | 2017 Military World Championships | Klaipėda, Lithuania |
| Win | 18–4 | (Azerbaijan) Aghahuseyn Mustafayev | 8–8 | September 20–23, 2017 | 2017 Military World Championships | Klaipėda, Lithuania |
| Win | 17–4 | (Iran) Nashri Mehran | TF 16–4 | September 20–23, 2017 | 2017 Military World Championships | Klaipėda, Lithuania |
| Win | 16–4 | (United States) Raymond Bunker | TF 11–0 | September 20–23, 2017 | 2017 Military World Championships | Klaipėda, Lithuania |
2017 MGL Open (silver) at 65 kg
| Loss | 15–4 | (Russia) Semen Tereshenko | 2–8 | April 29–30, 2017 | 2017 Mongolia Open | Ulaanbaatar, Mongolia |
| Win | 15–3 | (Russia) Aleksei Borovitski | 18–18 | April 29–30, 2017 | 2017 Mongolia Open | Ulaanbaatar, Mongolia |
| Win | 14–3 | (Mongolia) Narmandakhyn Lkhamgarmaa | TF 15–3 | April 29–30, 2017 | 2017 Mongolia Open | Ulaanbaatar, Mongolia |
| Win | 13–3 | (Kazakhstan) Askhat Clyamkhanov | 10–7 | April 29–30, 2017 | 2017 Mongolia Open | Ulaanbaatar, Mongolia |
| Win | 12–3 | (Russia) Burtsev Vair | 6–0 | April 29–30, 2017 | 2017 Mongolia Open | Ulaanbaatar, Mongolia |
2017 Ivan Yarygin Golden Grand Prix 5th at 61 kg
| Loss | 11–3 | (Tajikistan) Viktor Rassadin | 3–12 | January 27–29, 2017 | Golden Grand Prix Ivan Yarygin 2017 | Krasnoyarsk, Russia |
| Loss | 11–2 | (Chechnya) Akhmed Chakaev | 0–3 | January 27–29, 2017 | Golden Grand Prix Ivan Yarygin 2017 | Krasnoyarsk, Russia |
| Win | 11–1 | (Sakha Republic) Egor Ponomarev | TF 11–0 | January 27–29, 2017 | Golden Grand Prix Ivan Yarygin 2017 | Krasnoyarsk, Russia |
| Win | 10–1 | (Dagestan) Shamil Rashidov | 10–8 | January 27–29, 2017 | Golden Grand Prix Ivan Yarygin 2017 | Krasnoyarsk, Russia |
| Win | 9–1 | (Chechnya) Islam Dudaev | 8–6 | January 27–29, 2017 | Golden Grand Prix Ivan Yarygin 2017 | Krasnoyarsk, Russia |
2016 Military World Championships (gold) at 61 kg
| Win | 8–1 | (Ukraine) Vasyl Shuptar | 14–11 | September 19–25, 2016 | 2016 Military World Championships | Skopje, North Macedonia |
| Win | 7–1 | (China) Tian Zhenguang | TF 11–0 | September 19–25, 2016 | 2016 Military World Championships | Skopje, North Macedonia |
| Win | 6–1 | (Latvia) Maris Stals | TF 10–0 | September 19–25, 2016 | 2016 Military World Championships | Skopje, North Macedonia |
| Win | 5–1 | (India) Mandeep | TF 10–0 | September 19–25, 2016 | 2016 Military World Championships | Skopje, North Macedonia |
2015 Ivan Yarygin Golden Grand Prix (silver) at 61 kg
| Loss | 4–1 | (Russia) Aleksandr Bogomoev | 0–7 | January 22–26, 2015 | Golden Grand Prix Ivan Yarygin 2015 | Krasnoyarsk, Russia |
| Win | 4–0 | (Russia) Bulat Batoyev | 3–2 | January 22–26, 2015 | Golden Grand Prix Ivan Yarygin 2015 | Krasnoyarsk, Russia |
| Win | 3–0 | (Russia) Yegor Ponomarev | 3–2 | January 22–26, 2015 | Golden Grand Prix Ivan Yarygin 2015 | Krasnoyarsk, Russia |
| Win | 2–0 | (Russia) Vasiliy Struchkov | 3–2 | January 22–26, 2015 | Golden Grand Prix Ivan Yarygin 2015 | Krasnoyarsk, Russia |
| Win | 1–0 | (Russia) Gamlet Ramonov | TF 16–5 | January 22–26, 2015 | Golden Grand Prix Ivan Yarygin 2015 | Krasnoyarsk, Russia |

== Personal life ==
Kuular likes German cars, he has a BMW 3.

He is an active soldier of the Russian Ground Forces.

A fan of Xöömej (Tuvin national songs) and hip-hop music.

His favorite wrestler is Opan Sat.
