= 2018 Yasar Dogu Tournament =

Yasar Dogu 2018
- Host city: Istanbul, Turkey
- Dates: 27–29 July
- Stadium: Hasan Doğan Sports Hall

Champions
- Freestyle: United States
- Women: Ukraine

The 46th Yasar Dogu Tournament 2018, was a wrestling event held in Istanbul, Turkey between the 27 and 29 July 2018.

This international tournament includes competition in both men's and women's freestyle wrestling. This ranking tournament was held in honor of the two time Olympic Champion, Yaşar Doğu.

Wrestling champs square off in Istanbul tournament. Some 300 freestyle wrestlers from 25 countries descended on Istanbul on Friday for a three-day international tournament. The 46th edition of the Yaşar Doğu International Wrestling Tournament, named after the legendary Turkish wrestler, kicked off at Hasan Doğan Sports Hall.

== Ranking Series ==
Ranking Series Calendar 2018:

- 1st Ranking Series: 25–26 January, Iran, Mahshahr ⇒ 2018 Takhti Cup (GR)
- 2nd Ranking Series: 26–28 January, Russia, Krasnoyarsk ⇒ Golden Grand Prix Ivan Yarygin 2018 (FS)
- 3rd Ranking Series: 15–23 February, Cuba, La Havana ⇒ 2018 Granma y Cerro Pelado (FS, WW, GR)
- 4th Ranking Series: 16–18 February, Sweden, Klippan ⇒ Klippan Lady Open (2018) (WW)
- 5th Ranking Series: 9–10 June, Mongolia, Ulaanbaatar ⇒ 2018 Mongolia Open (FS, WW)
- 6th Ranking Series: 22–23 June, China, Taiyuan ⇒ 2018 China Open (WW)
- 7th Ranking Series: 23–24 June, Hungary, Győr ⇒ 2018 Hungarian Grand Prix (GR)
- 8th Ranking Series: 3–5 July, Georgia, Tbilisi ⇒ 2018 Tbilisi Grand Prix of V. Balavadze and G. Kartozia (FS, GR)
- 9th Ranking Series: 20–22 July, Turkey, Istanbul ⇒ 2018 Vehbi Emre & Hamit Kaplan Tournament (GR)
- 10th Ranking Series: 27–20 July, Turkey, Istanbul ⇒ 2018 Yasar Dogu Tournament (FS, WW)
- 11th Ranking Series: 7–9 September, Poland, Warsaw ⇒ Ziolkowski, Pytlasinski, Poland Open (FS, WW, GR)
- 12th Ranking Series: 14–16 September, Belarus, Minsk ⇒ Medved (Test Event Minsk 2019)

== Medal table ==
* Host nation (Turkey)

| Rank | Nation | Gold | Silver | Bronze | Total |
|---|---|---|---|---|---|
| 1 | Ukraine | 6 | 3 | 5 | 14 |
| 2 | Iran | 3 | 3 | 0 | 6 |
| 3 | United States | 3 | 1 | 2 | 6 |
| 4 | Azerbaijan | 2 | 4 | 5 | 11 |
| 5 | India | 2 | 3 | 5 | 10 |
| 6 | Turkey* | 1 | 2 | 7 | 10 |
| 7 | Germany | 1 | 0 | 2 | 3 |
| 8 | Bulgaria | 1 | 0 | 0 | 1 |
| 8 | Italy | 1 | 0 | 0 | 1 |
| 10 | Belarus | 0 | 1 | 3 | 4 |
| 11 | Kyrgyzstan | 0 | 1 | 0 | 1 |
| 11 | Lithuania | 0 | 1 | 0 | 1 |
| 11 | Tunisia | 0 | 1 | 0 | 1 |
| 14 | Kazakhstan | 0 | 0 | 4 | 4 |
| 15 | Romania | 0 | 0 | 1 | 1 |
| 15 | Slovakia | 0 | 0 | 1 | 1 |
| Totals (16 entries) | | 20 | 20 | 35 | 75 |

== Team ranking ==
| Rank | Men's freestyle | | Women's freestyle | |
| Rank | Team | Points | Team | Points |
|---|---|---|---|---|
| 1 | United States | 150 | Ukraine | 164 |
| 2 | Iran | 146 | India | 154 |
| 3 | Turkey | 126 | Turkey | 143 |
| 4 | Azerbaijan | 121 | Azerbaijan | 93 |
| 5 | Ukraine | 117 | Germany | 67 |
| 6 | India | 111 | Tunisia | 52 |
| 7 | Kazakhstan | 100 | Bulgaria | 49 |
| 8 | Belarus | 99 | Belarus | 21 |
| 9 | Italy | 25 | Kyrgyzstan | 20 |
| 10 | Turkmenistan | 18 | Lithuania | 20 |

== Medal overview ==
=== Men's freestyle ===
| Event | Gold | Silver | Bronze |
|---|---|---|---|
| 57 kg | Thomas Gilman; United States | Dzimchyk Rynchynau; Belarus | Süleyman Atlı; Turkey |
| 57 kg | Thomas Gilman; United States | Dzimchyk Rynchynau; Belarus | Vicky Vicky; India |
| 61 kg | Bagher Yakhkeshi; Iran | Sandeep Tomar; India | Mirjalal Hasanzada; Azerbaijan |
| 61 kg | Bagher Yakhkeshi; Iran | Sandeep Tomar; India | Andrei Bekreneu; Belarus |
| 65 kg | Mehran Nassiri; Iran | Ali Rahimzade; Azerbaijan | Daulet Niyazbekov; Kazakhstan |
| 65 kg | Mehran Nassiri; Iran | Ali Rahimzade; Azerbaijan | Madiyar Burkhan; Kazakhstan |
| 70 kg | Bajrang Punia; India | Andrey Kviatkovski; Ukraine | Ağahüseyn Mustafayev; Azerbaijan |
| 70 kg | Bajrang Punia; India | Andrey Kviatkovski; Ukraine | Mustafa Kaya; Turkey |
| 74 kg | Frank Chamizo; Italy | Jordan Burroughs; United States | Bolat Sakayev; Kazakhstan |
| 74 kg | Frank Chamizo; Italy | Jordan Burroughs; United States | Nurlan Bekzhanov; Kazakhstan |
| 79 kg | Kyle Dake; United States | Ibrahim Yusubov; Azerbaijan | Jabrayil Hasanov; Azerbaijan |
| 79 kg | Kyle Dake; United States | Ibrahim Yusubov; Azerbaijan | Rustam Dudaev; Ukraine |
| 86 kg | David Taylor; United States | Murad Suleymanov; Azerbaijan | Fatih Erdin; Turkey |
| 86 kg | David Taylor; United States | Murad Suleymanov; Azerbaijan | Boris Makoev; Slovakia |
| 92 kg | Mohammad Javad Ebrahimi; Iran | Alireza Karimi; Iran | Ivan Yankouski; Belarus |
| 92 kg | Mohammad Javad Ebrahimi; Iran | Alireza Karimi; Iran | Hajy Rajabau; Belarus |
| 97 kg | Aslanbek Alborov; Azerbaijan | Mojtaba Goleij; Iran | Kyle Snyder; United States |
| 97 kg | Aslanbek Alborov; Azerbaijan | Mojtaba Goleij; Iran | Fatih Yaşarlı; Turkey |
| 125 kg | Oleksandr Khotsianivskyi; Ukraine | Yadollah Mohebbi; Iran | Danilo Kartavyi; Ukraine |
| 125 kg | Oleksandr Khotsianivskyi; Ukraine | Yadollah Mohebbi; Iran | Nick Gwiazdowski; United States |

=== Women's freestyle ===
| Event | Gold | Silver | Bronze |
|---|---|---|---|
| 50 kg | Oksana Livach; Ukraine | Sarra Hamdi; Tunisia | Suzanna Şeicariu; Romania |
| 50 kg | Oksana Livach; Ukraine | Sarra Hamdi; Tunisia | Ritu Phogat; India |
| 53 kg | Anzhela Dorogan; Azerbaijan | Aysun Erge; Turkey | Khrystyna Bereza; Ukraine |
| 55 kg | Pinki; India | Olga Shnaider; Ukraine | Nurufe Duman; Turkey |
| 57 kg | Iryna Chykhradze; Ukraine | Pooja Dhanda; India | Tetyana Kit; Ukraine |
| 57 kg | Iryna Chykhradze; Ukraine | Pooja Dhanda; India | Alyona Kolesnik; Azerbaijan |
| 59 kg | Olena Kremzer; Ukraine | Sofiia Bodnar; Ukraine | Sangeeta Ballal; India |
| 62 kg | Taybe Yusein; Bulgaria | Aisuluu Tynybekova; Kyrgyzstan | Sarita Mor; India |
| 62 kg | Taybe Yusein; Bulgaria | Aisuluu Tynybekova; Kyrgyzstan | Luisa Niemesch; Germany |
| 65 kg | Ilona Prokopevniuk; Ukraine | Irina Netreba; Azerbaijan | Maria Ilchyshyn; Ukraine |
| 65 kg | Ilona Prokopevniuk; Ukraine | Irina Netreba; Azerbaijan | Geeta Phogat; India |
| 68 kg | Alla Belinska; Ukraine | Danute Domikaityte; Lithuania | Anna Schell; Germany |
| 72 kg | Beste Altuğ; Turkey | Rajni Rajni; India | Neslihan Ulusoy; Turkey |
| 76 kg | Aline Rotter-Focken; Germany | Yasemin Adar; Turkey | Sabira Aliyeva; Azerbaijan |
| 76 kg | Aline Rotter-Focken; Germany | Yasemin Adar; Turkey | Mehtap Gültekin; Turkey |

== Participating nations ==
237 competitors from 25 nations participated.

- Azerbaijan (22)
- Belarus (21)
- Bulgaria (4)
- Georgia (1)
- Germany (5)
- Hungary (1)
- India (26)
- Iran (11)
- Iraq (6)
- Italy (1)
- Kazakhstan (27)
- Kyrgyzstan (1)
- Lithuania (1)
- Moldova (2)
- Mongolia (1)
- Netherlands (1)
- Romania (1)
- Russia (2)
- Slovakia (1)
- Tajikistan (1)
- Turkmenistan (2)
- Tunisia (6)
- Turkey (53)
- Ukraine (30)
- United States (10)

== See also ==
- 2018 Vehbi Emre & Hamit Kaplan Tournament
- 2018 Dan Kolov & Nikola Petrov Tournament
- Golden Grand Prix Ivan Yarygin 2018
- 2018 Grand Prix Zagreb Open
- Klippan Lady Open (2018)
