= 2021 European Wrestling Championships – Men's freestyle 65 kg =

Wrestling competition

The men's freestyle 65 kg is a competition featured at the 2021 European Wrestling Championships, and was held in Warsaw, Poland on April 19 and April 20.

== Medalists ==
Gold	Zagir Shakhiev; Russia
Silver	Krzysztof Bieńkowski; Poland
Bronze	Ali Rahimzade; Azerbaijan
Bronze	Maxim Saculțan; Moldova

== Results ==
Legend

- F — Won by fall
- WO — Won by walkover

1/8 finals
Andrii Svyryd (UKR)	7^{F}
Gabriel Janatsch (AUT)	0
Zagir Shakhiev (RUS)	11
George Ramm (GBR)	0
Gevorg Tadevosyan (ARM)	1
Ali Rahimzade (AZE)	2
Shmagi Todua (GEO)	8
Quentin Sticker (FRA)	4
Nikolai Okhlopkov (ROU)	WO
~~Iszmail Muszukajev (HUN)~~
Niklas Dorn (GER)	1
Maxim Saculțan (MDA)	4
Krzysztof Bieńkowski (POL)	6
Andrei Bekreneu (BLR)	3
Hamza Alaca (TUR)	6
Ruhan Rasim (BUL)	9

Quarterfinals
Andrii Svyryd (UKR)	0
Zagir Shakhiev (RUS)	10
Ali Rahimzade (AZE)	9
Shmagi Todua (GEO)	4
Nikolai Okhlopkov (ROU)	10
Maxim Saculțan (MDA)	11
Krzysztof Bieńkowski (POL)	7
Ruhan Rasim (BUL)	2

Semifinals
Zagir Shakhiev (RUS)	8
Ali Rahimzade (AZE)	5
Maxim Saculțan (MDA)	3
Krzysztof Bieńkowski (POL)	7

Final
Zagir Shakhiev (RUS)	13
Krzysztof Bieńkowski (POL)	2

Repechage round 1
George Ramm (GBR)	0
Andrii Svyryd (UKR)	11
Andrei Bekreneu (BLR)	5
Ruhan Rasim (BUL)	4

Bronze medal match
Andrii Svyryd (UKR)	2
Ali Rahimzade (AZE)	3
Andrei Bekreneu (BLR)	2
Maxim Saculțan (MDA)	5

== Final standing ==
Rank	Athlete
1st place, gold medalist(s)	Zagir Shakhiev (RUS)
2nd place, silver medalist(s)	Krzysztof Bieńkowski (POL)
3rd place, bronze medalist(s)	Ali Rahimzade (AZE)
3rd place, bronze medalist(s)	Maxim Saculțan (MDA)
5	Andrii Svyryd (UKR)
5	Andrei Bekreneu (BLR)
7	Nikolai Okhlopkov (ROU)
8	Ruhan Rasim (BUL)
9	Shmagi Todua (GEO)
10	Hamza Alaca (TUR)
11	Quentin Sticker (FRA)
12	Gevorg Tadevosyan (ARM)
13	Niklas Dorn (GER)
14	Gabriel Janatsch (AUT)
15	George Ramm (GBR)
—	Iszmail Muszukajev (HUN)
