= 2018 Takhti Cup =

Wrestling event

- Host city: (Iran) Mahshahr⇒Greco-Roman; Tabriz⇒Freestyle
- Dates: 25–26 January; 8–9 February

The 2018 Takhti Cup, were held in the Greco-Romane style in Mahshahr 25–26 January 2018; the men's Freestyle style in Tabriz 8–9 February 2018 in Iran. This tournament was held as 38th. It was held as the first of the ranking series of United World Wrestling, it is only men's Greco-Roman ranking.

== Medal table ==
| Rank | Nation | Gold | Silver | Bronze | Total |
|---|---|---|---|---|---|
| 1 | Iran | 7 | 6 | 15 | 28 |
| 2 | Turkey | 4 | 6 | 4 | 14 |
| 3 | Kazakhstan | 2 | 2 | 4 | 8 |
| 4 | Kyrgyzstan | 2 | 1 | 2 | 5 |
| 5 | Mongolia | 2 | 0 | 2 | 4 |
| 6 | Bulgaria | 1 | 1 | 1 | 3 |
| 7 | Azerbaijan | 1 | 0 | 5 | 6 |
| 8 | Belarus | 1 | 0 | 1 | 2 |
| 9 | Georgia | 0 | 2 | 2 | 4 |
| 10 | Ukraine | 0 | 1 | 2 | 3 |
| 11 | Hungary | 0 | 1 | 0 | 1 |
| 12 | Armenia | 0 | 0 | 1 | 1 |
| Totals (12 entries) | | 20 | 20 | 39 | 79 |

=== Team ranking ===
| Rank | Freestyle | | Greco-Roman | |
| Rank | Team | Points | Team | Points |
|---|---|---|---|---|
| 1 | Iran | 200 | Iran | 192 |
| 2 | Turkey | 143 | Turkey | 171 |
| 3 | Georgia | 84 | Georgia | 145 |
| 4 | Kyrgyzstan | 80 | Azerbaijan | 84 |
| 5 | Kazakhstan | 80 | Ukraine | 81 |

== Medal overview ==
=== Freestyle ===
| Event | Gold | Silver | Bronze |
|---|---|---|---|
| 57 kg | Erdenebatyn Bekhbayar; Mongolia | Nader Hajaghania; Iran | Mihran Jaburyan; Armenia |
| 57 kg | Erdenebatyn Bekhbayar; Mongolia | Nader Hajaghania; Iran | Dzimchyk Rynchynau; Belarus |
| 61 kg | Niurgun Skriabin; Belarus | Mohammad Ramezanpour; Iran | Giorgi Revazishvili; Georgia |
| 61 kg | Niurgun Skriabin; Belarus | Mohammad Ramezanpour; Iran | Mohammad Maleki; Iran |
| 65 kg | Tömör-Ochiryn Tulga; Mongolia | Morteza Ghiasi; Iran | Vasyl Shuptar; Ukraine |
| 65 kg | Tömör-Ochiryn Tulga; Mongolia | Morteza Ghiasi; Iran | Behnam Ehsanpour; Iran |
| 70 kg | Enes Uslu; Turkey | Giorgi Sulava; Georgia | Joshgun Azimov; Azerbaijan |
| 70 kg | Enes Uslu; Turkey | Giorgi Sulava; Georgia | Semen Radulov; Ukraine |
| 74 kg | Ali-Pasha Umarpashaev; Bulgaria | Nurlan Bekzhanov; Kazakhstan | Yakup Gör; Turkey |
| 74 kg | Ali-Pasha Umarpashaev; Bulgaria | Nurlan Bekzhanov; Kazakhstan | Hamed Rashidi; Iran |
| 79 kg | Omid Hassantabar; Iran | Mihaly Nagy; Hungary | Murad Suleymanov; Azerbaijan |
| 79 kg | Omid Hassantabar; Iran | Mihaly Nagy; Hungary | Mohammad Motaghinia; Iran |
| 86 kg | Kamran Ghasempour; Iran | Ahmet Bilici; Turkey | Gadzhimurad Magomedsaidov; Azerbaijan |
| 86 kg | Kamran Ghasempour; Iran | Ahmet Bilici; Turkey | Masoud Madadi; Iran |
| 92 kg | İbrahim Bölükbaşı; Turkey | Arashk Mohebi; Iran | Batzul Ulziisaikhan; Mongolia |
| 92 kg | İbrahim Bölükbaşı; Turkey | Arashk Mohebi; Iran | Mohamad Ebrahimi; Iran |
| 97 kg | Amir Mohammadi; Iran | Rıza Yıldırım; Turkey | Aibek Usupov; Kyrgyzstan |
| 97 kg | Amir Mohammadi; Iran | Rıza Yıldırım; Turkey | Roman Bakirov; Azerbaijan |
| 125 kg | Parviz Hadi; Iran | Jafar Shams-Nateri; Iran | Lkhagvagerel Munkhtur; Mongolia |
| 125 kg | Parviz Hadi; Iran | Jafar Shams-Nateri; Iran | Ahmad Mirzapour; Iran |

=== Greco-Roman ===
| Event | Gold | Silver | Bronze |
|---|---|---|---|
| 55 kg | Ekrem Öztürk; Turkey | Bachana Putkaradze; Georgia | Moslem Naderi Khadem; Iran |
| 55 kg | Ekrem Öztürk; Turkey | Bachana Putkaradze; Georgia | Reza Khedri; Iran |
| 60 kg | Kanybek Zholchubekov; Kyrgyzstan | Mehrdad Mardani; Iran | Dastan Zarlykhanov; Kazakhstan |
| 60 kg | Kanybek Zholchubekov; Kyrgyzstan | Mehrdad Mardani; Iran | Meirambek Ainagulov; Kazakhstan |
| 63 kg | K. Sulaymanov; Kyrgyzstan | Kudaibergen Tursynov; Kyrgyzstan | Urmatbek Amatov; Kyrgyzstan |
| 63 kg | K. Sulaymanov; Kyrgyzstan | Kudaibergen Tursynov; Kyrgyzstan | Mohammad Nourbakhsh; Iran |
| 67 kg | Almat Kebispayev; Kazakhstan | Fevzi Mamutov; Ukraine | Mohammad Elyasi; Iran |
| 67 kg | Almat Kebispayev; Kazakhstan | Fevzi Mamutov; Ukraine | Atakan Yüksel; Turkey |
| 72 kg | Demeu Zhadrayev; Kazakhstan | Murat Dağ; Turkey | Ibragim Magomedov; Kazakhstan |
| 72 kg | Demeu Zhadrayev; Kazakhstan | Murat Dağ; Turkey | Farshad Belfakeh; Iran |
| 77 kg | Mohammad Ali Geraei; Iran | Serkan Akkoyun; Turkey | Boroomand Gharehdaghi; Iran |
| 77 kg | Mohammad Ali Geraei; Iran | Serkan Akkoyun; Turkey | Fatih Cengiz; Turkey |
| 82 kg | Emrah Kuş; Turkey | Daniel Aleksandrov; Bulgaria | Aivengo Rikadze; Georgia |
| 82 kg | Emrah Kuş; Turkey | Daniel Aleksandrov; Bulgaria | Burhan Akbudak; Turkey |
| 87 kg | Saman Azizi; Iran | Khussein Mutsolgov; Kazakhstan | Azamat Kustubayev; Kazakhstan |
| 87 kg | Saman Azizi; Iran | Khussein Mutsolgov; Kazakhstan | Tarek Abdelsalam; Bulgaria |
| 97 kg | Orkhan Nuriyev; Azerbaijan | Cenk İldem; Turkey | Ali Akbar Heidari; Iran |
| 97 kg | Orkhan Nuriyev; Azerbaijan | Cenk İldem; Turkey | Turman Eyyubov; Azerbaijan |
| 130 kg | Behnam Arpatapeh; Iran | Osman Yıldırım; Turkey | Shahab Ghourehjili; Iran |

== Participating nations ==
287 competitors from 16 nations participated.

- Armenia (11)
- Azerbaijan (21)
- Belarus (4)
- Bulgaria (8)
- Cuba (3)
- Georgia (24)
- Iran (79)
- Italy (5)
- Kazakhstan (25)
- Kyrgyzstan (21)
- Mongolia (4)
- Romania (6)
- Tajikistan (11)
- Turkmenistan (9)
- Turkey (42)
- Ukraine (18)

== Ranking Series ==
Ranking Series Calendar 2018:

- 1st Ranking Series: 25–26 January, Iran, Mahshahr ⇒ 2018 Takhti Cup (GR)
- 2nd Ranking Series: 26–28 January, Russia, Krasnoyarsk ⇒ Golden Grand Prix Ivan Yarygin 2018 (FS)
- 3rd Ranking Series: 15–23 February, Cuba, La Havana ⇒ 2018 Granma y Cerro Pelado (FS, WW, GR)
- 4th Ranking Series: 16–18 February, Sweden, Klippan ⇒ Klippan Lady Open (2018) (WW)
- 5th Ranking Series: 9–10 June, Mongolia, Ulaanbaatar ⇒ 2018 Mongolia Open (FS, WW)
- 6th Ranking Series: 22–23 June, China, Taiyuan ⇒ 2018 China Open (WW)
- 7th Ranking Series: 23–24 June, Hungary, Győr ⇒ 2018 Hungarian Grand Prix (GR)
- 8th Ranking Series: 3–5 July, Georgia, Tbilisi ⇒ 2018 Tbilisi Grand Prix of V. Balavadze and G. Kartozia (FS, GR)
- 9th Ranking Series: 20–22 July, Turkey, Istanbul ⇒ 2018 Vehbi Emre & Hamit Kaplan Tournament (GR)
- 10th Ranking Series: 27–20 July, Turkey, Istanbul ⇒ 2018 Yasar Dogu Tournament (FS, WW)
- 11th Ranking Series: 7–9 September, Poland, Warsaw ⇒ Ziolkowski, Pytlasinski, Poland Open (FS, WW, GR)
- 12th Ranking Series: 14–16 September, Belarus, Minsk ⇒ Medved (Test Event Minsk 2019)
