= 2018 Vehbi Emre & Hamit Kaplan Tournament =

- Host city: Turkey, Istanbul
- Dates: 20 – 22 July 2018
- Stadium: Bagcilar Sports Complex

The 36th Vehbi Emre & Hamit Kaplan Tournament 2018, was a wrestling event held in Istanbul, Turkey between 20 and 22 July 2018.

This international tournament includes competition men's Greco-Roman wrestling. This ranking tournament was held in honor of the Olympic Champion, Hamit Kaplan and Turkish Wrestler and manager Vehbi Emre.

== Medal table ==
Rank	Nation	Gold	Silver	Bronze	Total
1	Turkey	4	4	2	10
2	Belarus	2	2	2	6
3	Azerbaijan	1	1	3	5
4	Georgia	1	1	1	3
5	Kazakhstan	1	0	4	5
6	Ukraine	1	0	1	2
7	Japan	0	1	3	4
8	Moldova	0	1	0	1
9	Iran	0	0	2	2
9	Kyrgyzstan	0	0	2	2
Totals (10 entries)		10	10	20	40

=== Team ranking ===
Rank	Men's Greco-Roman	
Rank	Team	Points
1	Turkey	191
2	Belarus	121
3	Azerbaijan	121
4	Japan	104
5	Kazakhstan	102

== Greco-Roman ==
Event	Gold	Silver	Bronze
55 kg	(Turkey) Ekrem Öztürk	(Japan) Shota Tanokura	(Kazakhstan) Khorlan Zhakansha
55 kg	(Turkey) Ekrem Öztürk	(Japan) Shota Tanokura	(Kazakhstan) Zhanserik Sarsenbiyev
60 kg	(Kazakhstan) Aidos Sultangali	(Moldova) Victor Ciobanu	(Azerbaijan) Sakit Guliyev
60 kg	(Kazakhstan) Aidos Sultangali	(Moldova) Victor Ciobanu	(Japan) Hayanobu Shimizu
63 kg	(Azerbaijan) Taleh Mammadov	(Turkey) Rahman Bilici	(Georgia (country)) Lasha Mariamidze
63 kg	(Azerbaijan) Taleh Mammadov	(Turkey) Rahman Bilici	(Kyrgyzstan) Kaly Sulaimanov
67 kg	(Turkey) Murat Fırat	(Turkey) Ensar Karabacak	(Ukraine) Denys Demyankov
67 kg	(Turkey) Murat Fırat	(Turkey) Ensar Karabacak	(Azerbaijan) Kamran Mammadov
72 kg	(Belarus) Pavel Liakh	(Turkey) Murat Dağ	(Turkey) Cengiz Arslan
72 kg	(Belarus) Pavel Liakh	(Turkey) Murat Dağ	(Kazakhstan) Ibragim Magomedov
77 kg	(Turkey) Fatih Cengiz	(Belarus) Kazbek Kilov	(Kazakhstan) Tamerlan Shadukayev
77 kg	(Turkey) Fatih Cengiz	(Belarus) Kazbek Kilov	(Japan) Shohei Yabiku
82 kg	(Georgia (country)) Lasha Gobadze	(Turkey) Emrah Kuş	(Belarus) Viktar Sasunouski
82 kg	(Georgia (country)) Lasha Gobadze	(Turkey) Emrah Kuş	(Azerbaijan) Elvin Mursaliyev
87 kg	(Ukraine) Zhan Beleniuk	(Azerbaijan) Islam Abbasov	(Iran) Ramin Taheri
87 kg	(Ukraine) Zhan Beleniuk	(Azerbaijan) Islam Abbasov	(Japan) Masato Sumi
97 kg	(Belarus) Siarhei Staradub	(Georgia (country)) Aleksi Lodia	(Turkey) Süleyman Demirci
97 kg	(Belarus) Siarhei Staradub	(Georgia (country)) Aleksi Lodia	(Iran) Mehdi Aliyari
130 kg	(Turkey) Rıza Kayaalp	(Belarus) Kiryl Tsishchanka	(Belarus) Ioseb Chugoshvili
130 kg	(Turkey) Rıza Kayaalp	(Belarus) Kiryl Tsishchanka	(Kyrgyzstan) Murat Ramonov

== Participating nations ==
150 competitors from 16 nations participated.

- Azerbaijan (14)
- Belarus (11)
- Brazil (1)
- Bulgaria (7)
- Georgia (13)
- India (8)
- Iran (3)
- Japan (11)
- Kazakhstan (17)
- Kyrgyzstan (13)
- Latvia (2)
- Lithuania (7)
- Moldova (2)
- Romania (3)
- Turkey (29)
- Ukraine (9)

== Ranking Series ==
Ranking Series Calendar 2018:

- 1st Ranking Series: 25–26 January, Iran, Mahshahr ⇒ 2018 Takhti Cup (GR)
- 2nd Ranking Series: 26–28 January, Russia, Krasnoyarsk ⇒ Golden Grand Prix Ivan Yarygin 2018 (FS)
- 3rd Ranking Series: 15–23 February, Cuba, La Havana ⇒ 2018 Granma y Cerro Pelado (FS, WW, GR)
- 4th Ranking Series: 16–18 February, Sweden, Klippan ⇒ Klippan Lady Open (2018) (WW)
- 5th Ranking Series: 9–10 June, Mongolia, Ulaanbaatar ⇒ 2018 Mongolia Open (FS, WW)
- 6th Ranking Series: 22–23 June, China, Taiyuan ⇒ 2018 China Open (WW)
- 7th Ranking Series: 23–24 June, Hungary, Győr ⇒ 2018 Hungarian Grand Prix (GR)
- 8th Ranking Series: 3–5 July, Georgia, Tbilisi ⇒ 2018 Tbilisi Grand Prix of V. Balavadze and G. Kartozia (FS, GR)
- 9th Ranking Series: 20–22 July, Turkey, Istanbul ⇒ 2018 Vehbi Emre & Hamit Kaplan Tournament (GR)
- 10th Ranking Series: 27–20 July, Turkey, Istanbul ⇒ 2018 Yasar Dogu Tournament (FS, WW)
- 11th Ranking Series: 7–9 September, Poland, Warsaw ⇒ Ziolkowski, Pytlasinski, Poland Open (FS, WW, GR)
- 12th Ranking Series: 14–16 September, Belarus, Minsk ⇒ Medved (Test Event Minsk 2019)
