= Zagir Shakhiev =

Russian freestyle wrestler (born 1999)

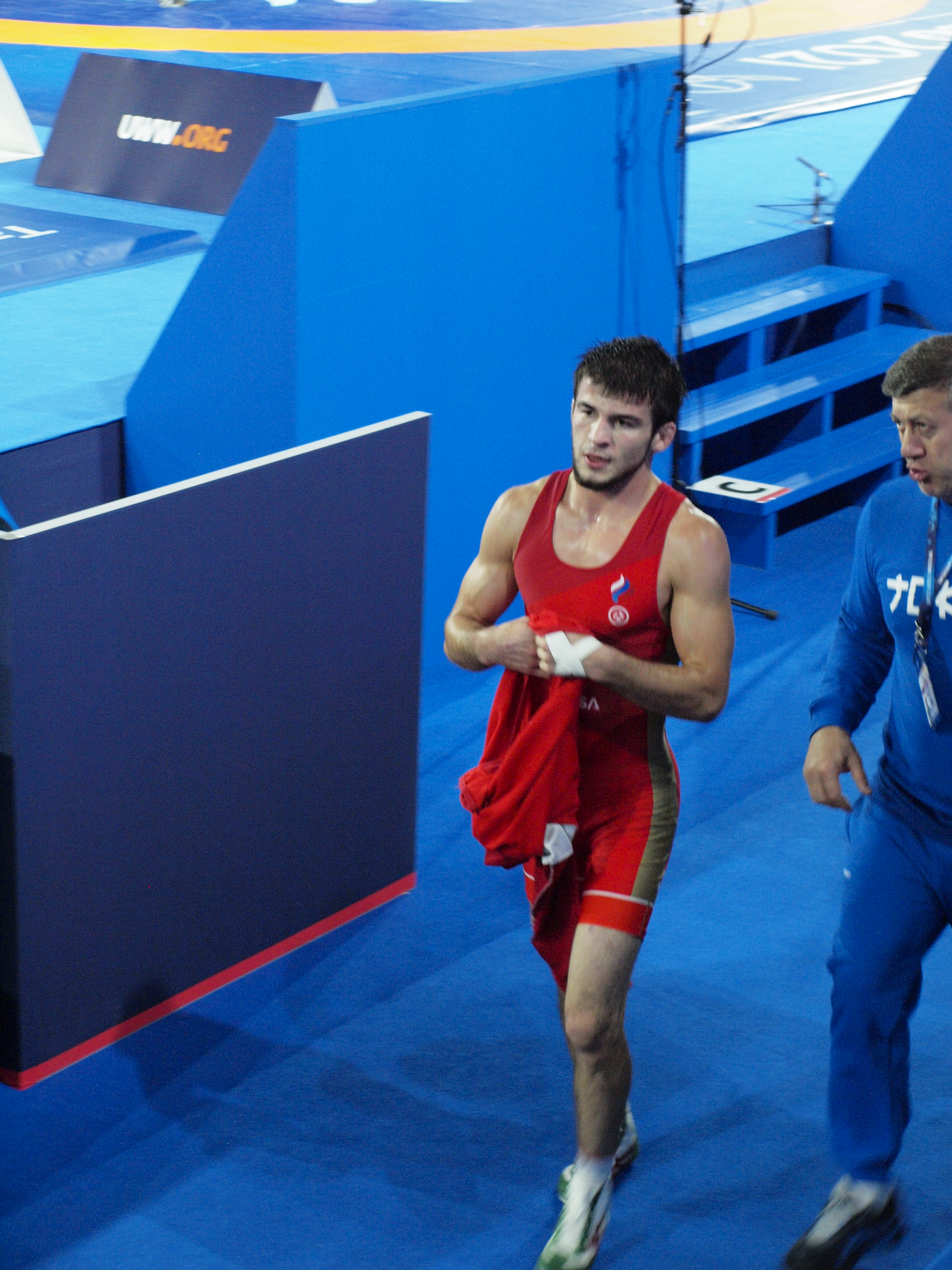
- Zagir Shakhiev at the 2021 World Wrestling Championships in Oslo, Norway

Personal information
- Native name: Загир Мухтарпашаевич Шахиев
- Full name: Zagir Mukhtarpashaevich Shahiev
- Nationality: Russia
- Born: 15 April 1999 (age 27) Khasavyurt, Dagestan, Russia
- Height: 173 cm (5 ft 8 in)

Sport
- Country: Russia
- Sport: Wrestling
- Weight class: 65 kg
- Event: Freestyle
- Coached by: Vakha Mintulaev

Achievements and titles
- World finals: (gold) (2021)
- Regional finals: (gold) (2021)
Medal record
Men's freestyle wrestling
Representing United World Wrestling
Grand Prix
Bronze medal – third place	2025 Ulaanbaatar	70 kg
Representing Russian Wrestling Federation
World Championships
Gold medal – first place	2021 Oslo	65 kg
Yasar Dogu Tournament
Silver medal – second place	2022 Istanbul	65 kg
Representing Russia
European Championships
Gold medal – first place	2021 Warsaw	65 kg
World Cadets Championships
Gold medal – first place	2016 Tbilisi	46 kg
Representing Dagestan
All-Russian Spartakiad
Silver medal – second place	2022 Kazan	70 kg
Russian National Championships
Silver medal – second place	2021 Ulan-Ude	65 kg
Bronze medal – third place	2020 Naro-Fominsk	65 kg
Bronze medal – third place	2024 Novoivanovskoye	65 kg

Zagir Mukhtarpashaevich Shakhiev (Russian: Загир Мухтарпашаевич Шахиев; born 15 April 1999) is a Russian freestyle wrestler who competes at 65 kilograms. Shakhiev is the 2021 World Champion and European Champion, as well as a two-time Russian National medalist and a Cadet World Champion.

== Career ==
Shakiev, of Chechen descent, started wrestling at the age of eight, and went on to become the 2016 Cadet World Champion at 46 kilograms. After competing at some international tournaments in Russia and Armenia, he broke into the senior level scene in 2020, claiming a bronze medal from the 2020 Russian National Championships, and followed the roll by claiming a silver medal in 2021, only losing to reigning World Champion from Dagestan Gadzhimurad Rashidov in the finals. After his performance at the 2021 Russian Nationals, Sakhiev claimed the 2021 European Continental Championship in April.

As a replacement for returning World Champion Gadzhimurad Rashidov, Sakhiev travelled to Norway in order to compete at the 2021 World Championships from 3 to 4 October. An underdog to win the championship, he battled on his way to the finale, notably defeating former Junior and University World Champion Selahattin Kılıçsallayan and '19 U23 Asian champion Tömör-Ochiryn Tulga to advance to the next date. Sakhiev dominated over Amir Mohammad Yazdani to claim the crown and become the 2021 World Champion on 4 October.

In 2022, he won the silver medal in his event at the Yasar Dogu Tournament held in Istanbul, Turkey.

== Major results ==
Year	Tournament	Venue	Result	Event
2021	European Championships	Warsaw, Poland	1st	Freestyle 65 kg
2021	World Championships	Oslo, Norway	1st	Freestyle 65 kg
