= 2022 U23 World Wrestling Championships – Men's freestyle 65 kg =

Wrestling competitions

Men's freestyle 65 kg at the 2022 U23 World Championships
- Venue: Pontevedra Municipal Sports Hall
- Dates: 21–22 October
- Competitors: 24 from 24 nations

Medalists
gold medal	Vazgen Tevanyan	Armenia
silver medal	Hamza Alaca	Turkey
bronze medal	Erik Arushanian	Ukraine
bronze medal	Ryoma Anraku	Japan

The men's freestyle 65 kg is a competition featured at the 2022 U23 World Wrestling Championships, and was held in Pontevedra, Spain on 21 and 22 October 2022. The qualification rounds were held on 20 October while medal matches were held on the 2nd day of the competition. A total of 24 wrestlers competed in this event, limited to athletes whose body weight was less than 65 kilograms.

This freestyle wrestling competition consists of a single-elimination tournament, with a repechage used to determine the winners of the two bronze medals. The two finalists face off for gold and silver medals. Each wrestler who loses to one of the two finalists moves into the repechage, culminating in a pair of bronze medal matches featuring the semifinal losers each facing the remaining repechage opponent from their half of the bracket.

== Results ==
Legend

- F — Won by fall
- R — Retired

=== Final ===
Final
Hamza Alaca (TUR)	4
Vazgen Tevanyan (ARM)	8

=== Top half ===
Round of 32
Ivan Badavrov (BUL)	0
Erik Arushanian (UKR)	10
Gamzatgadzsi Halidov (HUN)	6
Dominik Laritz (SUI)	6
Hamza Alaca (TUR)	8
Kian Mahmoudjanloo (IRI)	7
Ikromzhon Khadzhimurodov (KGZ)	5
Khamzat Arsamerzouev (FRA)	0

Round of 16
Gurbanmuhammet Çaryýew (TKM)	0
Erik Arushanian (UKR)	10
Dominik Laritz (SUI)	11
Maduwantha Kankanamalage (SRI)	0
Said Hosseini (FIN)	0
Hamza Alaca (TUR)	6^{F}
Ikromzhon Khadzhimurodov (KGZ)	4
Sammy Álvarez (PUR)	12

Quarterfinals
Erik Arushanian (UKR)	16
Dominik Laritz (SUI)	4
Hamza Alaca (TUR)	15
Sammy Álvarez (PUR)	5

Semifinals
Erik Arushanian (UKR)	8
Hamza Alaca (TUR)	14

=== Bottom half ===
Round of 32
Daniel Coles (CAN)	0
Vazgen Tevanyan (ARM)	10
Leon Gerstenberger (GER)	12
Felipe Ferrusola (ESP)	2
Ayub Musaev (BEL)	2^{R}
Gia Ugrelidze (GEO)	2
Constantin Chirilov (MDA)	0
Adlan Askarov (KAZ)	11

Round of 16
Ross Connelly (GBR)	0
Vazgen Tevanyan (ARM)	10
Leon Gerstenberger (GER)	0
Ryoma Anraku (JPN)	8
Cole Matthews (USA)	6
Gia Ugrelidze (GEO)	2
Adlan Askarov (KAZ)	10
Joe Fer Callado (PHI)	0

Quarterfinals
Vazgen Tevanyan (ARM)	4
Ryoma Anraku (JPN)	3
Cole Matthews (USA)	4
Adlan Askarov (KAZ)	6

Semifinals
Vazgen Tevanyan (ARM)	7
Adlan Askarov (KAZ)	6

=== Repechage ===
Repechage round 1
Kian Mahmoudjanloo (IRI)	10
Said Hosseini (FIN)	0
Daniel Coles (CAN)	12
Ross Connelly (GBR)	1

Repechage round 2
Kian Mahmoudjanloo (IRI)	9
Sammy Álvarez (PUR)	4
Daniel Coles (CAN)	1
Ryoma Anraku (JPN)	11

Bronze medals
Kian Mahmoudjanloo (IRI)	8
Erik Arushanian (UKR)	11
Ryoma Anraku (JPN)	7
Adlan Askarov (KAZ)	7

== Final standing ==
Rank	Athlete
1st place, gold medalist(s)	Vazgen Tevanyan (ARM)
2nd place, silver medalist(s)	Hamza Alaca (TUR)
3rd place, bronze medalist(s)	Erik Arushanian (UKR)
3rd place, bronze medalist(s)	Ryoma Anraku (JPN)
5	Kian Mahmoudjanloo (IRI)
5	Adlan Askarov (KAZ)
7	Dominik Laritz (SUI)
8	Gia Ugrelidze (GEO)
9	Daniel Coles (CAN)
10	Sammy Álvarez (PUR)
11	Leon Gerstenberger (GER)
12	Cole Matthews (USA)
13	Ikromzhon Khadzhimurodov (KGZ)
14	Gamzatgadzsi Halidov (HUN)
15	Felipe Ferrusola (ESP)
16	Ross Connelly (GBR)
17	Ayub Musaev (BEL)
18	Khamzat Arsamerzouev (FRA)
19	Gurbanmuhammet Çaryýew (TKM)
20	Ivan Badavrov (BUL)
21	Joe Fer Callado (PHI)
22	Maduwantha Kankanamalage (SRI)
23	Constantin Chirilov (MDA)
24	Said Hosseini (FIN)
