= 2021 Golden Grand Prix Ivan Yarygin =

XXXII Golden Grand Prix Ivan Yarygin 2021

Ivan Yarygin 2021
- Host city: Krasnoyarsk, Russia
- Dates: May 27–30
- Stadium: Ivan Yarygin Sports Palace

Champions
- Freestyle: Dagestan
- Women: Russia

The XXXII Golden Grand Prix Ivan Yarygin 2021, also known as Ivan Yarygin (Yariguin) 2021 was a United World Wrestling rankings freestyle wrestling international tournament, which was held in Krasnoyarsk, Russia between 27 and 30 May 2021.

== Medal table ==
Rank	Nation	Gold	Silver	Bronze	Total
1	Russia	9	13	24	46
2	Dagestan	4	2	1	7
3	Mongolia	2	2	2	6
4	(North Ossetia–Alania) North Ossetia-Alania	2	0	2	4
5	Moscow Oblast	1	1	0	2
6	Belarus	1	0	0	1
6	Egypt	1	0	0	1
8	Chechnya	0	1	0	1
8	Sakha Republic	0	1	0	1
10	(Kemerovo Oblast) Kemerovo	0	0	1	1
10	(Khanty-Mansi Autonomous Okrug) Khanty-Mansi	0	0	1	1
10	Krasnoyarsk	0	0	1	1
10	Kyrgyzstan	0	0	1	1
Totals (13 entries)		20	20	33	73

== Medal overview ==
=== Men's freestyle ===
Event	Gold	Silver	Bronze
57 kg	(Belarus) Aryan Tsiutryn	(Dagestan) Musa Mekhtikhanov	(Russia) Tamir Garmaev
57 kg	(Belarus) Aryan Tsiutryn	(Dagestan) Musa Mekhtikhanov	(Russia) Ramis Gamzatov
61 kg	(Dagestan) Abasgadzhi Magomedov	(Moscow Oblast) Rustam Karachanov	(Russia) Ezir Tyulish
61 kg	(Dagestan) Abasgadzhi Magomedov	(Moscow Oblast) Rustam Karachanov	(Russia) Zhargal Damdinov
65 kg	(North Ossetia–Alania) Alik Khadartsev	(Russia) Dasha Sharastepanov	(Russia) Ramazan Ferzaliev
65 kg	(North Ossetia–Alania) Alik Khadartsev	(Russia) Dasha Sharastepanov	(Russia) Chaiaan Mongush
70 kg	(Dagestan) Kurban Shiraev	(Sakha Republic) Viktor Rassadin	(Russia) Rezuan Kasharov
70 kg	(Dagestan) Kurban Shiraev	(Sakha Republic) Viktor Rassadin	(Khanty-Mansi Autonomous Okrug) David Baev
74 kg	(Russia) Aznaur Tavaev	(Russia) Nikita Suchkov	(Russia) Ruslan Bogatyrev
74 kg	(Russia) Aznaur Tavaev	(Russia) Nikita Suchkov	(Krasnoyarsk) Ayub Abregov
79 kg	(Dagestan) Akhmed Usmanov	(Dagestan) Amanula Gadzhimagomedov	(Russia) Yusup Aidaev
79 kg	(Dagestan) Akhmed Usmanov	(Dagestan) Amanula Gadzhimagomedov	(Kyrgyzstan) Arsalan Budazhapov
86 kg	(Dagestan) Magomedsharif Biyakaev	(Chechnya) Zelimkhan Minkailov	(Russia) Tazhikin Akaev
86 kg	(Dagestan) Magomedsharif Biyakaev	(Chechnya) Zelimkhan Minkailov	(North Ossetia–Alania) Vladislav Valiev
92 kg	(North Ossetia–Alania) Guram Chertkoev	(Russia) Tamerlan Tapsiev	(Russia) Nurgün Sergin
92 kg	(North Ossetia–Alania) Guram Chertkoev	(Russia) Tamerlan Tapsiev	(Russia) Zagid Karimov
97 kg	(Russia) Magomedkhan Magomedov	(Russia) Igor Ovsyannikov	(Russia) David Dzhuraev
97 kg	(Russia) Magomedkhan Magomedov	(Russia) Igor Ovsyannikov	(Dagestan) Shamil Gadzhialiev
125 kg	(Moscow Oblast) Zelimkhan Khizriev	(Russia) Khamzat Khizriev	(North Ossetia–Alania) Vitaly Goloev
125 kg	(Moscow Oblast) Zelimkhan Khizriev	(Russia) Khamzat Khizriev	(Kemerovo Oblast) Ostap Pasenok

=== Women's freestyle ===
Event	Gold	Silver	Bronze
50 kg	(Russia) Milana Makhacheva	(Russia) Madina Chubanova	(Russia) Anzhelika Fedorova
50 kg	(Russia) Milana Makhacheva	(Russia) Madina Chubanova	(Russia) Valeriya Chepsarakova
53 kg	(Russia) Aleksandra Skirenko	(Russia) Daria Khvostova	(Mongolia) Batkhuyagiin Khulan
53 kg	(Russia) Aleksandra Skirenko	(Russia) Daria Khvostova	(Russia) Leila Karymova
55 kg	(Russia) Viktoriia Vaulina	(Russia) Sevil Nazarova	(Russia) Tatiana Novik
55 kg	(Russia) Viktoriia Vaulina	(Russia) Sevil Nazarova	(Russia) Ekaterina Isakova
57 kg	(Russia) Zhargalma Tcyrenova	(Russia) Khadizhat Murtuzalieva	(Russia) Kristina Kondrateva
59 kg	(Mongolia) Baatarjavyn Shoovdor	(Mongolia) Erkhembayaryn Davaachimeg	(Russia) Alexandra Nitsenko
62 kg	(Russia) Anastasia Parokhina	(Russia) Uliana Tukurenova	(Russia) Alina Kazymova
65 kg	(Mongolia) Zorigtyn Bolortungalag	(Russia) Dinara Salikhova	(Russia) Mariia Kuznetsova
68 kg	(Russia) Natalia Fedoseeva	(Mongolia) Ochirbatyn Nasanburmaa	(Russia) Tatiana Smoliak
72 kg	(Russia) Ksenia Burakova	(Russia) Alena Starodubtseva	(Mongolia) Enkh-Amaryn Davaanasan
76 kg	(Egypt) Samar Amer	(Russia) Ekaterina Bukina	(Russia) Kristina Shumova

== Participating nations ==
192 competitors from 9 nations participated.

- Belarus (2)
- Greece (1)
- Kazakhstan (12)
- Kyrgyzstan (1)
- Moldova (2)
- Mongolia (8)
- Russia (164)
- Turkey (1)
- Uzbekistan (1)
