= Mikyay Naim =

Bulgarian freestyle wrestler

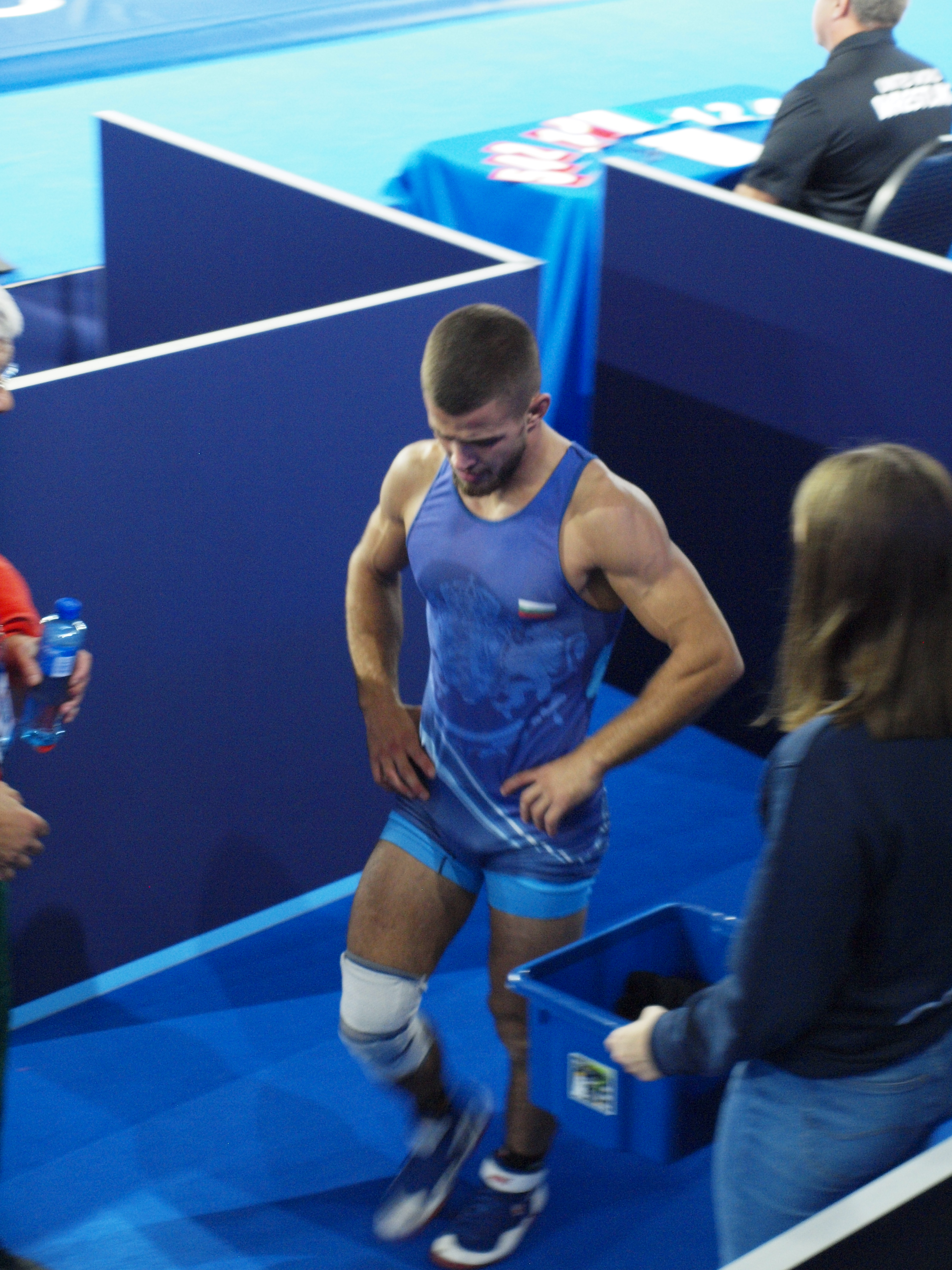

Personal information
- Native name: Микяй Салим Наим
- Full name: Mikyay Salim Naim
- Born: 4 November 1997 (age 28) Bulgaria
- Height: 1.63 m (5 ft 4 in)
- Weight: 65 kg (143 lb)

Sport
- Country: Bulgaria
- Sport: Amateur wrestling
- Weight class: 65 kg
- Event: Freestyle
- Club: Dimitrovgrad Wrestling Club
- Coached by: Salim Salim

Achievements and titles
- Regional finals: (silver) (2023)
Medal record
Men's freestyle wrestling
Representing Bulgaria
European Championships
Silver medal – second place	2023 Zagreb	65 kg
Dan Kolov - Nikola Petrov Tournament
Gold medal – first place	2021 Plovdiv	57 kg
Poland Open (Wacław Ziółkowski Memorial)
Silver medal – second place	2023 Warsaw	65 kg
World U23 Championships
Silver medal – second place	2017 Bydgoszcz	57 kg
European Juniors Championships
Silver medal – second place	2015 Istanbul	55 kg
Silver medal – second place	2017 Dortmund	55 kg
Bronze medal – third place	2016 Bucharest	55 kg
European Cadet Championships
Silver medal – second place	2012 Katowice	46 kg
Bronze medal – third place	2013 Bar	50 kg
Bronze medal – third place	2014 Samokov	54 kg

Mikyay Salim Naim (Bulgarian: Микяй Салим Наим; born 4 October 1997) is a Bulgarian freestyle wrestler. He won the silver medal in the 65 kg event at the 2023 European Wrestling Championships held in Zagreb, Croatia.

== Career ==
He won the silver medal at the 2023 European Wrestling Championships in Zagreb, Croatia, losing to Armenian Vazgen Tevanyan 12–1 with technical superiority in the men's freestyle 65 kg final match. He had reached the final after defeating Swiss Nino Leutert 10–3 in the first round, Georgian Edemi Bolkvadze 6–2 in the quarterfinals and Romanian Ștefan Coman 7–0 in the semifinals.

He competed at the 2024 European Wrestling Olympic Qualification Tournament in Baku, Azerbaijan hoping to qualify for the 2024 Summer Olympics in Paris, France. He was eliminated in his second match and he did not qualify for the Olympics.

== Achievements ==
Year	Tournament	Location	Result	Event
2023	European Championships	Zagreb, Croatia	2nd	Freestyle 65 kg
