= Alibek Osmonov =

Kyrgyzstani freestyle wrestler

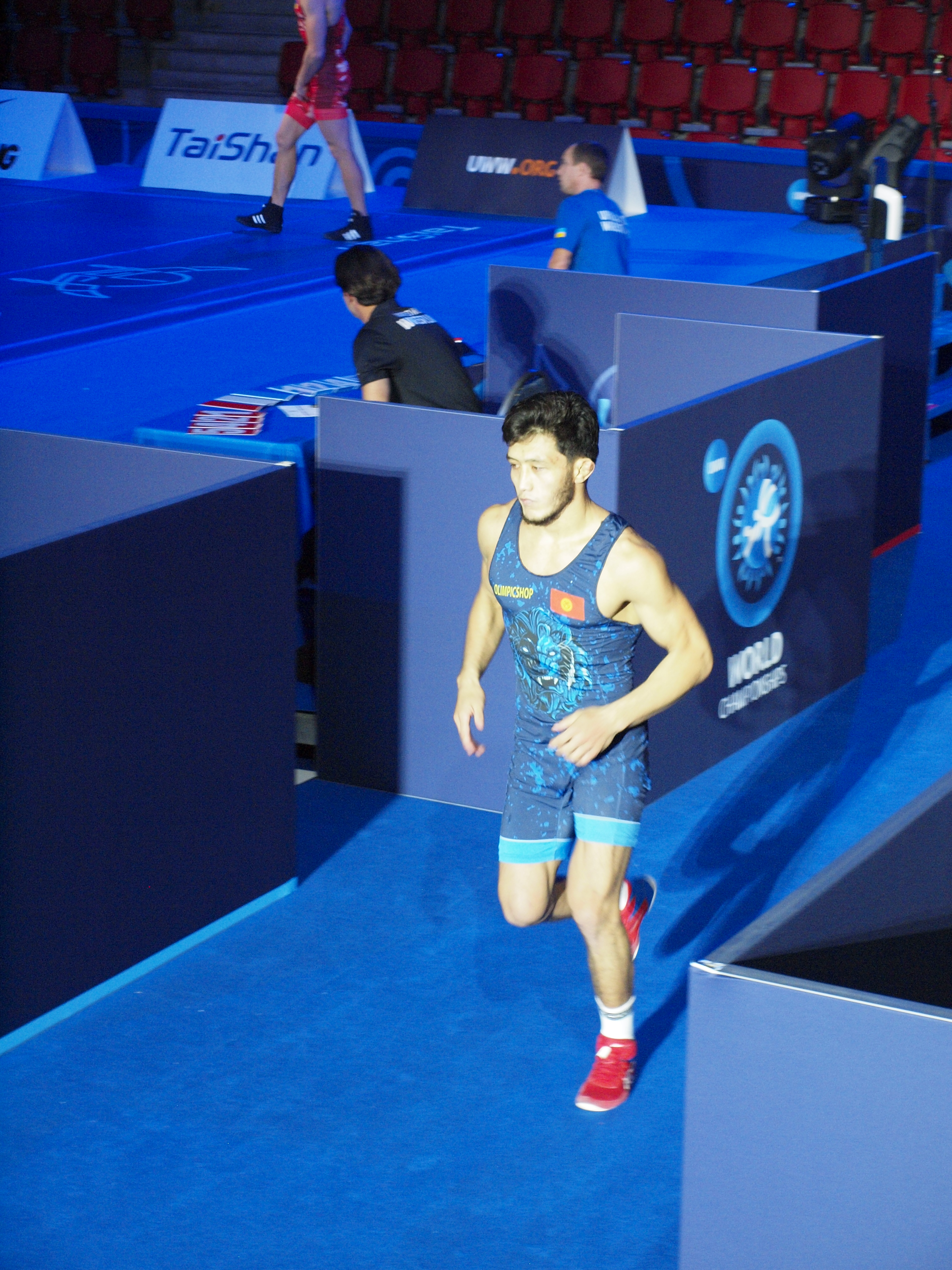
- Alibek Osmonov at the 2021 World Wrestling Championships in Oslo, Norway

Personal information
- Native name: Алибек Осмонов
- Nationality: Kyrgyzstan
- Born: 7 November 1996 (age 29) Talas, Kyrgyzstan
- Height: 170 cm (5 ft 7 in)
- Website: Instagram Profile

Sport
- Country: Kyrgyzstan
- Sport: Amateur wrestling
- Weight class: 65 kg
- Event: Freestyle

Achievements and titles
- World finals: (bronze) (2021)
- Regional finals: (bronze) (2024)
Medal record
Men's freestyle wrestling
Representing Kyrgyzstan
World Championships
Bronze medal – third place	2021 Oslo	65 kg
Asian Championships
Bronze medal – third place	2024 Bishkek	70 kg
Islamic Solidarity Games
Silver medal – second place	2017 Baku	61 kg
Yasar Dogu Tournament
Gold medal – first place	2021 Istanbul	65 kg
Grand Prix
Silver medal – second place	2023 Bishkek	65 kg
Bronze medal – third place	2024 Budapest	70 kg
Bronze medal – third place	2022 Almaty	70 kg

Alibek Osmonov (born 7 November 1996) is a Kyrgyzstani freestyle wrestler. He won one of the bronze medals in the men's 65 kg event at the 2021 World Wrestling Championships held in Oslo, Norway.

== Career ==
Osmonov won the silver medal in the men's 61 kg event at the 2017 Islamic Solidarity Games held in Baku, Azerbaijan. He also competed in the men's 61 kg event at the 2017 World Wrestling Championships held in Paris, France.

In 2018, Osmonov represented Kyrgyzstan at the Asian Games held in Indonesia and he competed in the men's 65 kg event.

He competed in the 65 kg event at the 2022 World Wrestling Championships held in Belgrade, Serbia.

== Achievements ==
Year	Tournament	Location	Result	Event
2017	Islamic Solidarity Games	Baku, Azerbaijan	2nd	Freestyle 61 kg
2021	World Championships	Oslo, Norway	3rd	Freestyle 65 kg
