= Erik Arushanian =

Ukrainian freestyle wrestler

Personal information
- Native name: Ерік Борисович Арушанян
- Nationality: Ukraine
- Born: 20 January 1999 (age 27) Ukraine
- Height: 165 cm (5 ft 5 in)
- Weight: 70 kg (154 lb)

Sport
- Country: Ukraine
- Sport: Amateur wrestling
- Weight class: 65 kg
- Event: Freestyle

Achievements and titles
- Regional finals: (bronze) (2020) (bronze) (2023)
Medal record
Men's freestyle wrestling
Representing Ukraine
European Championships
Bronze medal – third place	2020 Rome	65 kg
Bronze medal – third place	2023 Zagreb	65 kg
Grand Prix
Silver medal – second place	2022 Rome	65 kg
Bronze medal – third place	2023 Alexandria	65 kg
Bronze medal – third place	2022 Warsaw	65 kg
World U23 Championships
Bronze medal – third place	2022 Pontevedra	65 kg
European U23 Championships
Gold medal – first place	2021 Skopje	65 kg
World Juniors Championships
Gold medal – first place	2019 Tallinn	70 kg
Bronze medal – third place	2018 Trnava	65 kg

Erik Arushanian (Ukrainian: Ерік Борисович Арушанян; born 20 January 1999) is a Ukrainian freestyle wrestler of Armenian ethnicity who competes at 65 kilograms. Arushanian claimed a bronze medal from the 2020 European Championships and is the 2021 U23 European Continental champion. In 2019, he became the Junior World Champion at 70 kilos, after claiming a bronze medal from the Junior World Championships in 2018.

Arushanian competed in the 65 kg event at the 2022 World Wrestling Championships held in Belgrade, Serbia. He competed at the 2024 European Wrestling Olympic Qualification Tournament in Baku, Azerbaijan hoping to qualify for the 2024 Summer Olympics in Paris, France. Arushanian was eliminated in his second match and he did not qualify for the Olympics. He also competed at the 2024 World Wrestling Olympic Qualification Tournament held in Istanbul, Turkey without qualifying for the Olympics.

== Achievements ==
Year	Tournament	Venue	Result	Event
2018	Junior World Championships	Trnava, Slovakia	3rd	Freestyle 65 kg
2019	Junior World Championships	Tallinn, Estonia	1st	Freestyle 70 kg
2020	European Championships	Rome, Italy	3rd	Freestyle 65 kg
2021	U23 European Championships	Skopje, North Macedonia	1st	Freestyle 65 kg
2023	European Championships	Zagreb, Croatia	3rd	Freestyle 65 kg
