= Golden Grand Prix Ivan Yarygin 2018 – Men's freestyle 65 kg =

The men's freestyle 65 kg is a competition featured at the Golden Grand Prix Ivan Yarygin 2018, and was held in Krasnoyarsk, Russia on 27 January.

== Medalists ==
Gold	(Dagestan) Ilyas Bekbulatov
Silver	(Chechnya) Akhmed Chakaev
Bronze	(Turkey) Selahattin Kılıçsallayan
Bronze	(Tuva) Nachyn Kuular

== Results ==
Legend

- F — Won by fall

=== Final ===
Final
(Chechnya) Akhmed Chakaev	3
(Dagestan) Ilyas Bekbulatov	3

=== Top half ===
- qualification: Nachyn Kuular of Tuva def. Islam Dudaev of Chechnya by TF, (5-2)

==== Section 1 ====
Round of 16

Round of 8
(Kazakhstan) Kenessary Baltash	0
(United States) Jayson Ness	10
(Georgia (country)) Magamed Saidov	1
(Mongolia) Tsogtbaatar Damdinbazar	11
(Kazakhstan) Yerkin Jalgassov
(Chechnya) Akhmed Chakaev	WO
(Uzbekistan) Temurjon Usmonohunov	0
(Turkey) Selahattin Kılıçsallayan	6

Quarterfinals
(United States) Jayson Ness	3
(Mongolia) Tsogtbaatar Damdinbazar	5
(Chechnya) Akhmed Chakaev	11
(Turkey) Selahattin Kılıçsallayan	0

Semifinals
(Mongolia) Tsogtbaatar Damdinbazar	1
(Chechnya) Akhmed Chakaev	9

=== Bottom half ===
==== Section 2 ====
Round of 16
(Kyrgyzstan) Nurgazy Abdurazakov	3
(United States) Logan Stieber	13
(Uzbekistan) Sirojiddin Hasanov	3
(Georgia (country)) Edemi Bolkvadze	8
(United States) Joshua Kinding	1
(Tuva) Nachyn Kuular	12
(Turkey) Opan Sat	4^{F}
(Turkey) Ali Cam	0
(Mongolia) Tulga Tumur-Ochir	5
(Kazakhstan) Timur Aitkulov	0
(Cuba) Lazaro Valdes	9
(Mongolia) Batmagnai Batchuluun	13
(China) Hasibagena Hasibagena	0
(Cuba) Yowlys Bonne	11

Round of 8
(Dagestan) Ilyas Bekbulatov	16
(United States) Logan Stieber	6
(Georgia (country)) Edemi Bolkvadze	0
(Tuva) Nachyn Kuular	10
(Turkey) Opan Sat	6
(Mongolia) Tulga Tumur-Ochir	3
(Mongolia) Batmagnai Batchuluun	10
(Cuba) Yowlys Bonne	3

Quarterfinals
(Dagestan) Ilyas Bekbulatov	12
(Tuva) Nachyn Kuular	5
(Turkey) Opan Sat	2
(Mongolia) Batmagnai Batchuluun	4

Semifinals
(Dagestan) Ilyas Bekbulatov	10
(Mongolia) Batmagnai Batchuluun	0

== Repechage ==
Repechage round 1
-
-
-
-

Repechage round 2
-
-
(United States) Logan Stieber	4
(Tuva) Nachyn Kuular	10

Bronze medals
(Mongolia) Tsogtbaatar Damdinbazar	1
(Turkey) Selahattin Kılıçsallayan	8
(Tuva) Nachyn Kuular	12
(Mongolia) Batmagnai Batchuluun	2
