= Wrestling at the 2022 Commonwealth Games – Men's freestyle 65 kg =

Wrestling competition

Wrestling – Men's freestyle 65 kg at the 2022 Commonwealth Games
- Venue: Coventry Arena
- Dates: 5 August 2022
- Competitors: 12 from 12 nations

Medalists
gold medal	Bajrang Punia	India
silver medal	Lachlan McNeil	Canada
bronze medal	Inayat Ullah	Pakistan
bronze medal	George Ramm	England

The Men's freestyle 65 kg wrestling competitions at the 2022 Commonwealth Games in Birmingham, England took place on 5 August at the Coventry Arena. A total of 12 competitors from 12 nations took part.

This freestyle wrestling competition consists of a single-elimination tournament, with a repechage used to determine the winner of two bronze medals. The two finalists face off for gold and silver medals. Each wrestler who loses to one of the two finalists moves into the repechage, culminating in a pair of bronze medal matches featuring the semifinal losers each facing the remaining repechage opponent from their half of the bracket.

== Results ==
The draw is as follows:

Legend

- F — Won by fall

=== Main bracket ===
Round of 16
Brahm Richards (NZL)	0
Ross Connelly (SCO)	10
Inayat Ullah (PAK)	10
Adam Vella (MLT)	0
Mostafa Rezaeifar (AUS)	0
George Ramm (ENG)	3
Lowe Bingham (NRU)	0
Bajrang Punia (IND)	4^{F}

Quarterfinals
Lachlan McNeil (CAN)	10
Ross Connelly (SCO)	0
Inayat Ullah (PAK)	4
Amas Daniel (NGR)	0
Jason Afrikaner (NAM)	0
George Ramm (ENG)	7
Bajrang Punia (IND)	6^{F}
Jean Bandou (MRI)	0

Semifinals
Lachlan McNeil (CAN)	11
Inayat Ullah (PAK)	0
George Ramm (ENG)	0
Bajrang Punia (IND)	10

Final
Lachlan McNeil (CAN)	2
Bajrang Punia (IND)	9

=== Repechage ===
Repechage round
Lowe Bingham (NRU)	6^{F}
Jean Bandou (MRI)	4

Bronze medal match
Ross Connelly (SCO)	0
Inayat Ullah (PAK)	10
Lowe Bingham (NRU)	0
George Ramm (ENG)	11
