= 2018 European Wrestling Championships – Men's freestyle 65 kg =

The men's freestyle 65 kg is a competition featured at the 2018 European Wrestling Championships, and was held in Kaspiysk, Russia on May 4 and May 5.

== Medalists ==
Gold	Haji Aliyev; Azerbaijan
Silver	Ilyas Bekbulatov; Russia
Bronze	Selahattin Kılıçsallayan; Turkey
Bronze	Vladimer Khinchegashvili; Georgia

== Results ==
Legend

- F — Won by fall

=== Final ===
Final
Haji Aliyev (AZE)	8
Ilyas Bekbulatov (RUS)	7

=== Top half ===
Round of 32

Round of 16
Mykola Bolotňuk (SVK)	2
Ilman Mukhtarov (FRA)	11
David Habat (SLO)	9
Tital Dzhafarian (UKR)	2
Selahattin Kılıçsallayan (TUR)	6
Viktar Serada (BLR)	1
Haji Aliyev (AZE)	10
Gabriel Janatsch (AUT)	0

Quarterfinals
Ilman Mukhtarov (FRA)	0
David Habat (SLO)	10
Selahattin Kılıçsallayan (TUR)	2
Haji Aliyev (AZE)	9

Semifinals
David Habat (SLO)	0
Haji Aliyev (AZE)	3

=== Bottom half ===
Round of 32
Filip Novachkov (BUL)	3
Juan Pablo González (ESP)	6

Round of 16
Valodya Frangulyan (ARM)	0
Vladimer Khinchegashvili (GEO)	3
Andrei Perpeliţă (MDA)	2
Ilyas Bekbulatov (RUS)	8
Roman Asharin (HUN)	4
Krzysztof Bieńkowski (POL)	7
Kevin Henkel (GER)	10
Juan Pablo González (ESP)	8

Quarterfinals
Vladimer Khinchegashvili (GEO)	0
Ilyas Bekbulatov (RUS)	6
Krzysztof Bieńkowski (POL)	9
Kevin Henkel (GER)	0

Semifinals
Ilyas Bekbulatov (RUS)	12
Krzysztof Bieńkowski (POL)	0

=== Repechage ===
Repechage round 1
Gabriel Janatsch (AUT)	0
Selahattin Kılıçsallayan (TUR)	10
Andrei Perpeliţă (MDA)	2
Vladimer Khinchegashvili (GEO)	3

Bronze medal match
Selahattin Kılıçsallayan (TUR)	8
David Habat (SLO)	7
Vladimer Khinchegashvili (GEO)	8
Krzysztof Bieńkowski (POL)	4
