= Niurgun Skriabin =

Belarusian freestyle wrestler

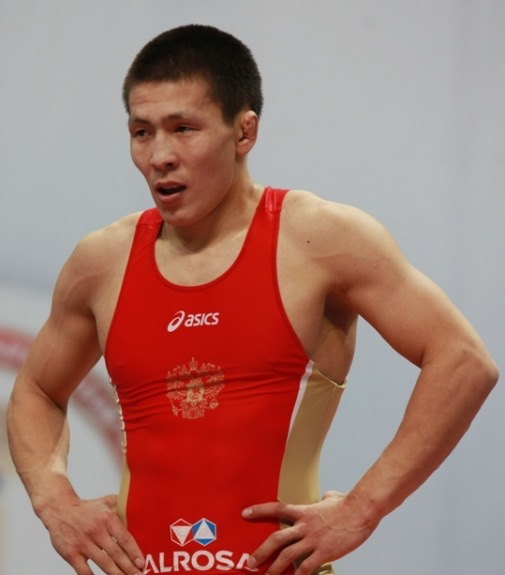

Personal information
- Native name: Нюргун Владимирович Скрябин
- Nationality: Belarus
- Born: Nurgun Vladimirovich Skriabin; 5 May 1990 (age 36) Sakha, Yakutsk
- Height: 168 cm (5 ft 6 in)

Sport
- Country: Russia; Belarus (since 2018)
- Sport: Amateur wrestling
- Weight class: 65 kg
- Event: Freestyle
- Club: Thsp; Churapcha
- Coached by: Gavril Ignatev

Achievements and titles
- World finals: 9th(2018)
- Regional finals: 5th(2018) (silver) (2020)
- National finals: (bronze) (2016)
Medal record
Men's freestyle wrestling
Representing Belarus
European Championships
Silver medal – second place	2020 Rome	65 kg
Takhti Cup
Gold medal – first place	2018 Tabriz	61 kg
Dan Kolov & Nikola Petrov Tournament
Bronze medal – third place	2022 Veliko Tarnovo	65 kg
Bronze medal – third place	2019 Russe	65 kg
Olympic Qualification Tournament
Bronze medal – third place	2021 Sofia	65 kg
Representing (Sakha Republic) Sakha
Russian National Championships
Bronze medal – third place	2016 Yakutsk	61 kg
Golden Grand Prix Ivan Yarygin
Gold medal – first place	2016 Krasnoyarsk	61 kg
Bronze medal – third place	2015 Krasnoyarsk	57 kg
Representing Russia
World University Championships
Bronze medal – third place	2014 Pecs	61kg

Niurgun Skriabin is a Belarusian freestyle wrestler. He won the silver medal in the 65 kg event at the 2020 European Wrestling Championships held in Rome, Italy. He competed at the World Wrestling Championships in 2018 and in 2019.

In March 2021, Skriabin competed at the European Qualification Tournament in Budapest, Hungary hoping to qualify for the 2020 Summer Olympics in Tokyo, Japan. He lost his first match against Vazgen Tevanyan of Armenia and then failed to reach the bronze medal match in the repechage.

Skriabin competed at the 2024 European Wrestling Olympic Qualification Tournament in Baku, Azerbaijan hoping to qualify for the 2024 Summer Olympics in Paris, France. He was eliminated in his second match and he did not qualify for the Olympics. Skriabin also competed at the 2024 World Wrestling Olympic Qualification Tournament held in Istanbul, Turkey without qualifying for the Olympics.

== Achievements ==
Year	Tournament	Venue	Result	Event
2020	European Championships	Rome, Italy	2nd	Freestyle 65 kg
