= Ali Rahimzade =

Azerbaijani freestyle wrestler

Əli Rəhimzadə
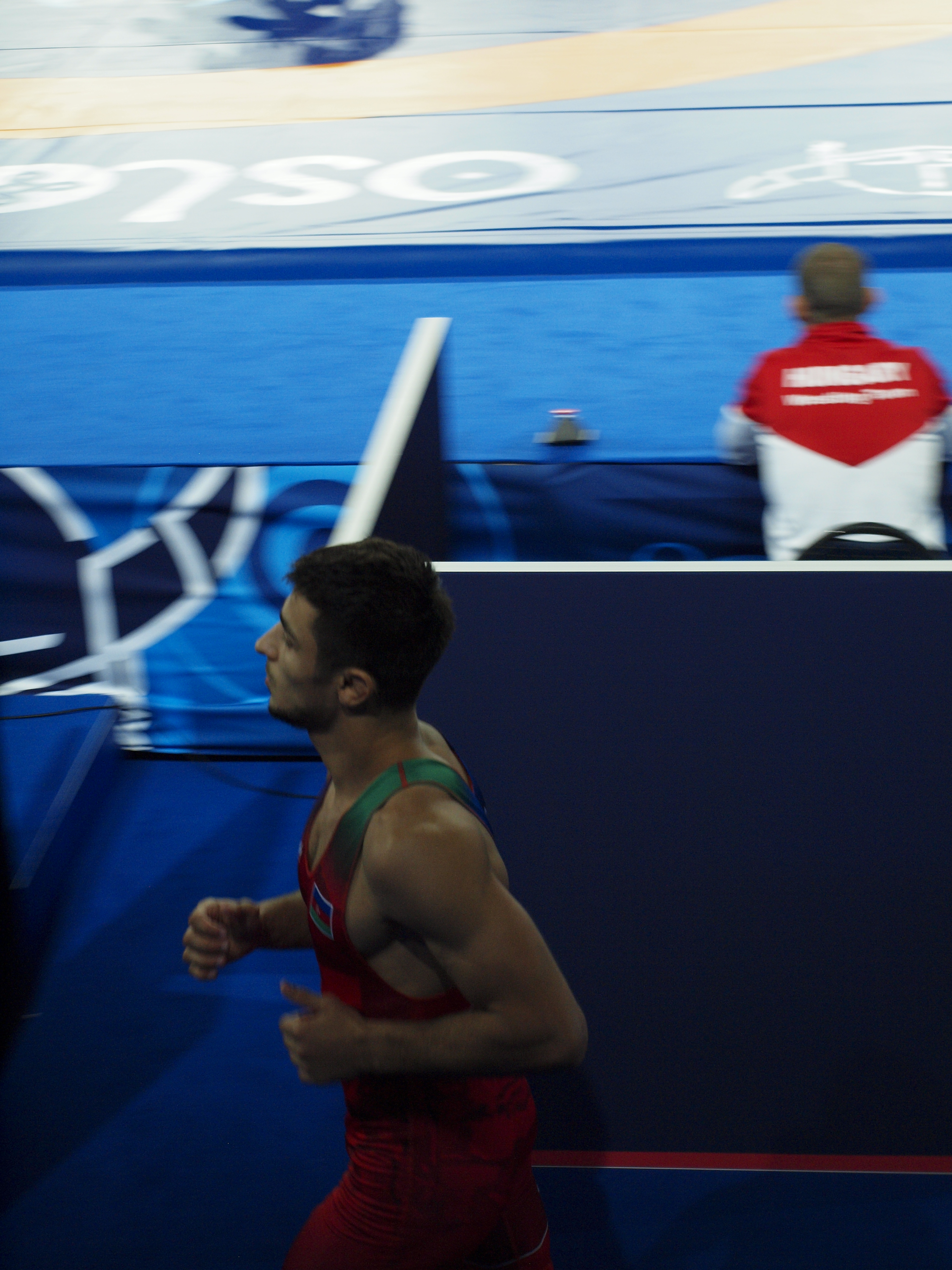
- Ali Rahimzade at the 2021 World Wrestling Championships in Oslo, Norway

Personal information
- Native name: Əli Rəhimzadə
- Nationality: Azerbaijan
- Born: 23 November 1997 (age 28) Azerbaijan
- Height: 168 cm (5 ft 6 in)

Sport
- Country: Azerbaijan
- Sport: Amateur wrestling
- Weight class: 65 kg
- Event: Freestyle

Achievements and titles
- Regional finals: (bronze) (2020) (bronze) (2021) (bronze) (2024)
Medal record
Men's freestyle wrestling
Representing Azerbaijan
European Championships
| Bronze medal – third place | 2020 Rome | 65 kg |
| Bronze medal – third place | 2021 Warsaw | 65 kg |
| Bronze medal – third place | 2024 Bucharest | 65 kg |
| Bronze medal – third place | 2025 Bratislava | 65 kg |
World Cup
| Bronze medal – third place | 2017 Kermandshah | 61 kg |
World Military Championships
| Gold medal – first place | 2023 Baku | 65 kg |
Yasar Dogu Tournament
| Gold medal – first place | 2020 Istanbul | 65 kg |
| Silver medal – second place | 2018 Istanbul | 65 kg |
Grand Prix
| Silver medal – second place | 2025 Budapest | 65 kg |
| Bronze medal – third place | 2022 Rome | 65 kg |
| Bronze medal – third place | 2023 Zagreb | 65 kg |
| Bronze medal – third place | 2025 Zagreb | 65 kg |
World U23 Championships
| Silver medal – second place | 2018 Bucharest | 65 kg |
European U23 Championships
| Bronze medal – third place | 2017 Szombathely | 61 kg |
European Junior Championships
| Gold medal – first place | 2017 Dortmund | 60 kg |

Ali Rahimzade (Əli Rəhimzadə, born 23 November 1997) is an Azerbaijani freestyle wrestler. He is a four-time bronze medalist at the European Wrestling Championships.

== Career ==
At the 2018 World U23 Wrestling Championship held in Bucharest, Romania, he won the silver medal in the 65 kg event.

In 2020, Rahimzade won one of the bronze medals in the 65 kg event at the European Wrestling Championships held in Rome, Italy. He repeated this in the same event at the 2021 European Wrestling Championships held in Warsaw, Poland.

Rahimzade won one of the bronze medals in the men's 65 kg event at the 2024 European Wrestling Championships held in Bucharest, Romania.

== Achievements ==
| Year | Tournament | Venue | Result | Event |
|---|---|---|---|---|
| 2020 | European Championships | Rome, Italy | 3rd | Freestyle 65 kg |
| 2021 | European Championships | Warsaw, Poland | 3rd | Freestyle 65 kg |
| 2024 | European Championships | Bucharest, Romania | 3rd | Freestyle 65 kg |
| 2025 | European Championships | Bratislava, Slovakia | 3rd | Freestyle 65 kg |
