= Vasyl Shuptar =

Ukrainian freestyle wrestler

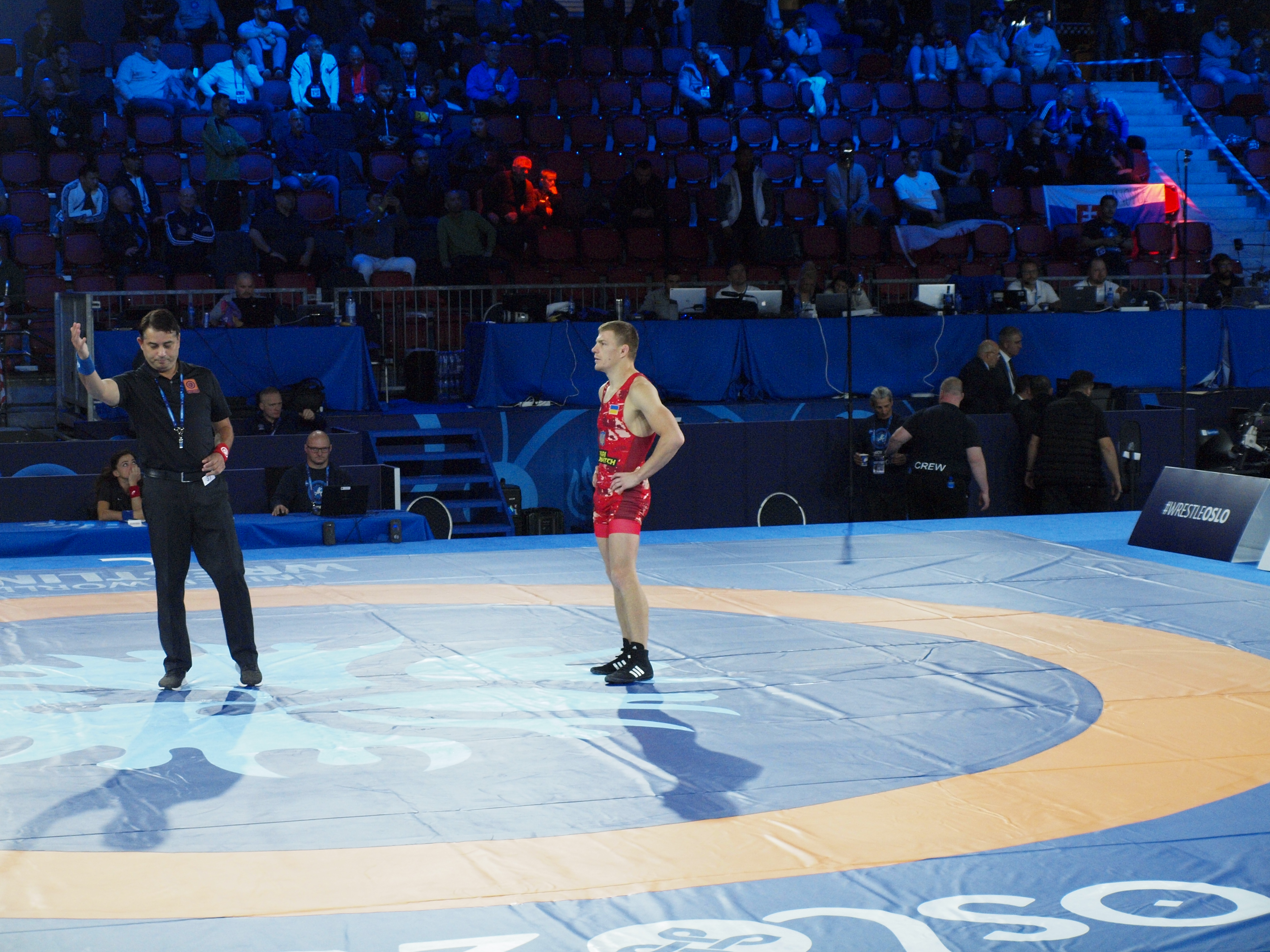
- 2021 World Championships Norway Oslo

Personal information
- Native name: Василь Іванович Шуптар
- Full name: Vasily Ivanovich Shuptar
- Nationality: Ukraine
- Born: 27 January 1991 (age 35) Lviv, Ukraine
- Height: 167 cm (5 ft 6 in)

Sport
- Country: Ukraine
- Sport: Wrestling
- Weight class: 65 kg
- Event: Freestyle
Medal record
Men's freestyle wrestling
Representing Ukraine
World Championships
Bronze medal – third place	2015 Las Vegas	61 kg
European Games
Bronze medal – third place	2015 Baku	61 kg
European Championships
Bronze medal – third place	2019 Bucharest	65 kg
Bronze medal – third place	2014 Vantaa	61 kg
Military World Games
Silver medal – second place	2019 Wuhan	65 kg
World Military Championships
Silver medal – second place	2016 Skopje	61 kg
Summer Universiade
Bronze medal – third place	2013 Kazan	61 kg
World University Championships
Gold medal – first place	2012 Kuortane	60 kg
Dan Kolov & Nikola Petrov Tournament
Gold medal – first place	2026 Plovdiv	70 kg
Takhti Cup
Bronze medal – third place	2018 Tabriz	65 kg

Vasyl Shuptar (born January 27, 1991, in Lviv) is a Ukrainian male freestyle wrestler. He is medalist of all the major competitions in wrestling.
