= Selahattin Kılıçsallayan =

Turkish freestyle wrestler

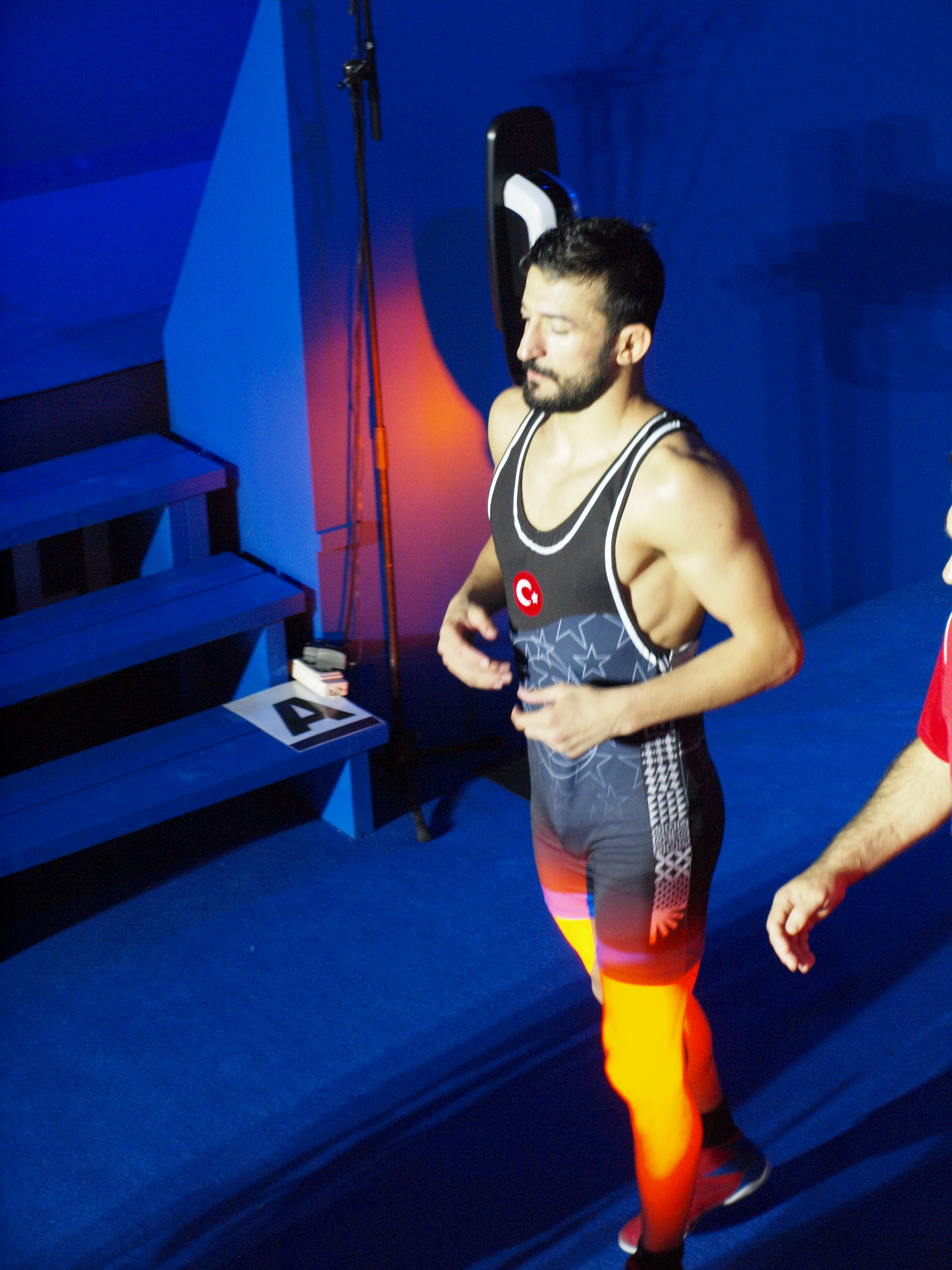

Personal information
- Born: 18 October 1993 (age 32) Kahramanmaraş
- Height: 173 cm (5 ft 8 in)
- Weight: 65 kg (143 lb)

Sport
- Country: Turkey
- Sport: Amateur wrestling
- Weight class: 65 kg
- Event: Freestyle
Medal record
Men's freestyle wrestling
Representing Turkey
European Championships
| Silver medal – second place | 2019 Bucharest | 65 kg |
| Bronze medal – third place | 2018 Kaspiysk | 65 kg |
Military World Games
| Bronze medal – third place | 2019 Wuhan | 65 kg |
Mediterranean Games
| Gold medal – first place | 2018 Tarragona | 65 kg |
Yasar Dogu Tournament
| Bronze medal – third place | 2017 Istanbul | 65 kg |
| Bronze medal – third place | 2021 Istanbul | 70 kg |
Ivan Yarygin Grand Prix
| Bronze medal – third place | 2018 Krasnoyarsk | 65 kg |
World Juniors Championships
| Gold medal – first place | 2013 Sofia | 66 kg |
European Juniors Championships
| Gold medal – first place | 2013 Skopje | 66 kg |
| Silver medal – second place | 2012 Zagreb | 60 kg |

Selahattin Kılıçsallayan (born 18 October 1993) is a Turkish freestyle wrestler. At the 2018 Mediterranean Games held in Tarragona, Spain, he won the gold medal in the men's 65 kg event.

== Career ==
In 2019, Kılıçsallayan won the silver medal in the 65 kg event at the European Wrestling Championships held in Bucharest, Romania. In that same year, he also won one of the bronze medals in the 65 kg event at the 2019 Military World Games held in Wuhan, China.

In March 2021, he competed at the European Qualification Tournament in Budapest, Hungary hoping to qualify for the 2020 Summer Olympics in Tokyo, Japan.

== Achievements ==
| Year | Tournament | Location | Result | Event |
|---|---|---|---|---|
| 2018 | European Championships | Kaspiysk, Russia | 3rd | Freestyle 65 kg |
| 2018 | Mediterranean Games | Tarragona, Spain | 1st | Freestyle 65 kg |
| 2019 | European Championships | Bucharest, Romania | 2nd | Freestyle 65 kg |
| 2019 | Military World Games | Wuhan, China | 3rd | Freestyle 65 kg |
