= Klippan, Scania =

Klippan
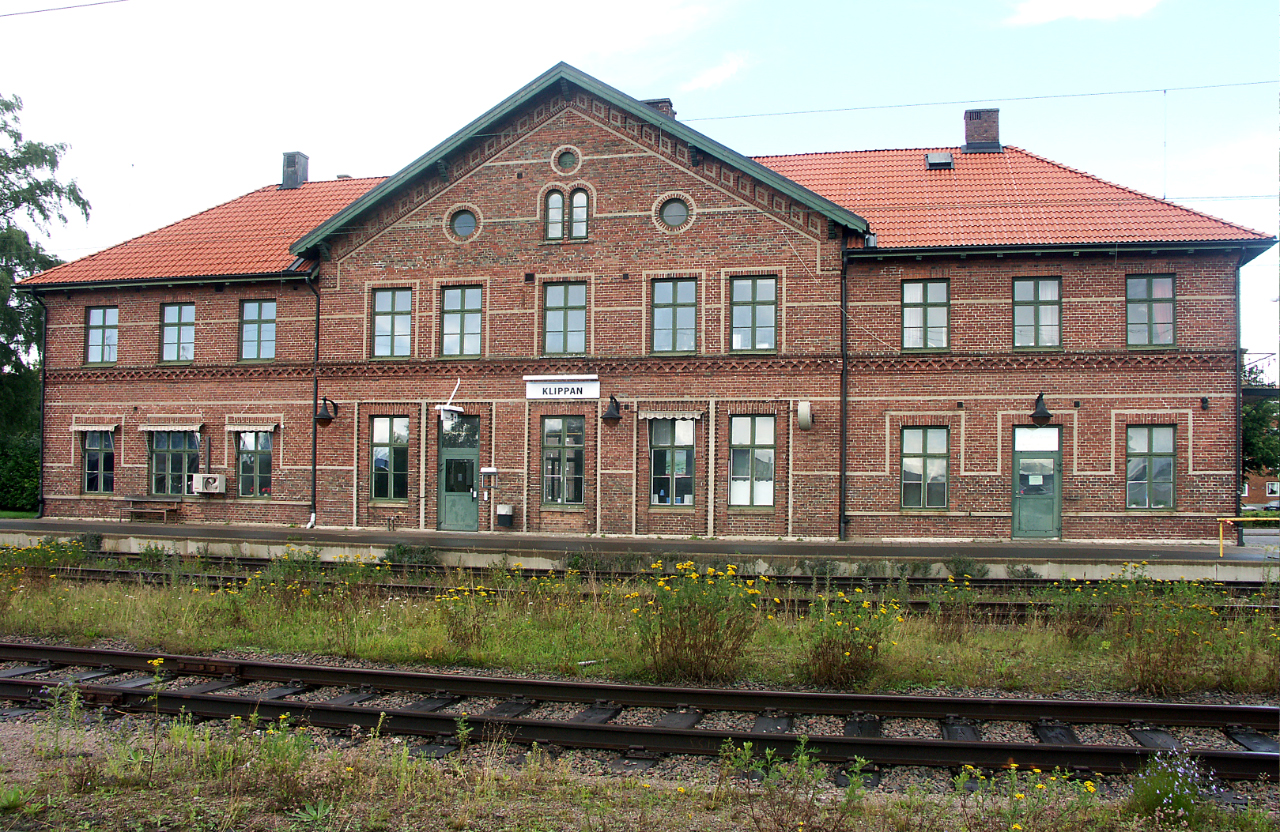
- Klippan Train Station

- Coat of arms

- Location within Skåne Location within Sweden
- Coordinates: 56°08′04″N 13°07′42″E
- Country: Sweden
- Province: Skåne
- County: Skåne County
- Municipality: Klippan Municipality

Area
  - Total: 5.0 km^{2} (1.9 sq mi)

Population (31 December 2010)
  - Total: 8,116
  - Density: 1,623/km^{2} (4,200/sq mi)
- Time zone: UTC+1 (CET)
  - Summer (DST): UTC+2 (CEST)

Klippan (literally the Cliff) is a locality and the seat of Klippan Municipality, Skåne County, Sweden with 8,116 inhabitants in 2010.

The famous liberal economist Bertil Ohlin was a native of Klippan.

In September 1995, Gerard Gbeyo, a young asylum seeker from the Ivory Coast, was stabbed to death in Klippan by two teenagers with neo-Nazi sympathies.

== Sports ==
The following sports clubs are located in Klippan:

- Klippans FF
- Klippans BK
