= George Ramm =

British freestyle wrestler (born 1996)

Personal information
- Nationality: British (English)
- Born: 1 August 1996 (age 30) Bolton, England

Sport
- Sport: Amateur wrestling
- Event: 65kg
Medal record
Men's freestyle wrestling
Representing England
Commonwealth Games
Bronze medal – third place	2022 Birmingham	65 kg

George Anthony Ramm (born 1 August 1996) is an English international freestyle wrestler. He has represented England at three Commonwealth Games and won a bronze medal in 2022. As well as a European Bronze Medal In 2016 in Bucharest

== Biography ==
Ramm competed in the 2014 and 2018 Commonwealth Games, finishing fourth on the Gold Coast in 2018.

In 2022, he was selected for the 2022 Commonwealth Games in Birmingham where he competed in the men's 65 kg category, winning the bronze medal.

Ramm was a three-times winner of the British Wrestling Championships in 2016, 2017 and 2019.
