= Maxim Saculțan =

Moldovan sport wrestler (born 1996)

Personal information
- Born: 18 November 1996 (age 29) Inești, Moldova
- Height: 174 cm (5 ft 9 in)
- Weight: 65 kg (143 lb)

Sport
- Country: Moldova
- Sport: Wrestling
- Weight class: 65 kg
- Event: Freestyle
Medal record
Men's freestyle wrestling
Representing Moldova
U23 World Championships
| Bronze medal – third place | 2019 Budapest | 65 kg |
| Bronze medal – third place | 2018 Bucharest | 65 kg |
European Championships
| Bronze medal – third place | 2021 Warsaw | 65 kg |
Grand Prix
| Bronze medal – third place | 2023 Erevan | 70 kg |
| Silver medal – second place | 2019 Bucharest | 65 kg |

Maxim Saculțan (born 18 November 1996) is a Moldovan freestyle wrestler who competes at 65 kilograms. A two-time U23 World medalist and 2021 European medalist, Saculțan represented Moldova at the 2024 Summer Olympics.

Saculțan is also a singer and rapper, known by his stage name Magnat.
