= RAF 12 =

Upcoming 2026 wrestling event

RAF 12: Dvalishvili vs. Cejudo 2
- The poster for RAF 12: Dvalishvili vs. Cejudo 2
- Promotion: Real American Freestyle
- Date: August 22, 2026
- Venue: Rocket Arena
- City: Cleveland, Ohio

Event chronology
RAF 11: Tsarukyan vs. Covington	RAF 12: Dvalishvili vs. Cejudo 2	RAF Moscow: Chimaev vs. Woodley

RAF 12: Dvalishvili vs. Cejudo 2 was a freestyle wrestling event produced by the Real American Freestyle (RAF) promotion which took place on August 22, 2026, at the Rocket Arena in Cleveland, Ohio.

== Background ==
This event marked the first-year anniversary show of RAF, returning to the promotion's original host city of Cleveland, Ohio for the first time since RAF 01.

A lightweight bout for the inaugural RAF Lightweight Crossover Championship with former UFC Bantawmeight Champion Merab Dvalishvili and former UFC Flyweight and fellow Bantamweight Champion (also 2008 Olympic gold medalist in freestyle wrestling) Henry Cejudo headlined the event. They competed in freestyle wrestling for the first time at RAF Georgia in July 2026 where Dvalishvili won by decision. They were originally scheduled to compete at RAF 08 in April 2026 but Cejudo withdrew hours before the event. Their first bout was at UFC 298 in mixed martial arts in February 2024 where Dvalishvili won via unanimous decision.

A catchweight bout between 2012 Olympic gold medalist in freestyle wrestling Jordan Burroughs and Sean Brady was scheduled to headline the event, but was shifted to the co-main event for undisclosed reasons.

An RAF Crossover Cruiserweight Championship match between former current champion (also former interim UFC Welterweight Champion) Colby Covington and former UFC Welterweight Champion Belal Muhammad was scheduled for the event. However, the bout was shifted to September at RAF 13 as the main event.

Two additional championship bouts took place:

- An RAF Middleweight Championship bout for the vacant title between former champion Evan Wick and Jason Nolf. In their first two meetings in April 2021 and September 2021, Nolf won the matches by technical fall. They later met at RAF 01 in August 2025 where Wick won the inaugural championship by decision. The title was vacated in June 2026 when former champion Dean Hamiti was stripped for undisclosed reasons, paving the way for this bout.
- An RAF Welterweight Championship bout between reigning champion David Carr and Tajmuraz Salkazanov. They competed three previous times with Salkazanov winning in February 2024 and February 2025, and Carr winning in July 2025.

In addition, Kennedy Blades was scheduled to defend her RAF Women's Middleweight Championship against Diana Avsaragova, but Avsaragova withdrew. Reese Larramendy replaced Avsaragova, and it was changed to a non-title catchweight bout.

== Fight card ==
Main card
Weight class				Method	Round	Time	Notes
Lightweight	(United States) Henry Cejudo	def.	(Georgia (country)) Merab Dvalishvili	Pinfall	1	0:36	(Note: For the inaugural RAF Lightweight Crossover Championship.)
Catchweight	(United States) Jordan Burroughs	def.	(United States) Sean Brady	Technical fall (11–0)	2	0:12
Light Heavyweight	(United States) Max McEnelly	def.	(United States) Bo Nickal	Decision (6-0)	3	2:00
Cruiserweight	(United States) Tyron Woodley	def.	(United States) Joaquin Buckley	Decision (14-8)	3	2:00
Middleweight	(United States) Jason Nolf	def.	(United States) Evan Wick	Technical fall (11-1)	3	0:26	(Note: For the vacant RAF Middleweight Championship.)
Featherweight	(United States) Jesse Mendez	def.	(Georgia (country)) Vladimer Khinchegashvili	Decision (7-2)	3	2:00
Welterweight	(United States) David Carr (c)	def.	(Slovakia) Tajmuraz Salkazanov	Decision (5-4)	3	2:00	(Note: For the RAF Welterweight Championship.)
Catchweight	(United States) Kennedy Blades (c)	def.	(United States) Reese Larramendy	Technical fall (11-0)	2	0:08
Featherweight	(United States) Johnni DiJulius	def.	(Kazakhstan) Asu Almabayev	Technical fall (10-0)	1	1:28
Bantamweight	(Japan) Masanosuke Ono	def.	(United States) Ben Davino	Decision (4-0)	3	2:00
Middleweight	(Belarus) Mahamedkhabib Kadzimahamedau	def.	(United States) Will Lewan	Injury default (7-0)	1	2:00
Heavyweight	(United States) Gable Steveson	def.	(United States) Anthony Cassioppi	Decision (6-0)	3	2:00

== Bonus awards ==
The following athletes received bonuses.

- Match of the Night: Tyron Woodley vs. Joaquin Buckley and Jason Nolf vs. Evan Wick
- Performance of the Night: Max McEnelly and Johnni DiJulius
- Flight of the Night: Jason Nolf

== See also ==
- List of RAF events
