= RAF Moscow =

Upcoming 2026 wrestling event

RAF Moscow: Chimaev vs. Woodley
- The poster for RAF Moscow: Chimaev vs. Woodley
- Promotion: Real American Freestyle
- Date: September 5, 2026
- Venue: Mytishchi Arena
- City: Mytishchi, Moscow Oblast, Russia

Event chronology
| RAF 12: Dvalishvili vs. Cejudo 2 | RAF Moscow: Chimaev vs. Woodley | RAF 13: Covington vs Muhammad |

RAF Moscow: Chimaev vs. Woodley was a freestyle wrestling event produced by the Real American Freestyle (RAF) promotion that took place on September 5, 2026, at the Mytishchi Arena in Mytishchi, Moscow Oblast, Russia.

As a result of ongoing U.S. sanctions against Russia related to the Russian invasion of Ukraine, Fox Nation declined to go through with plans to air the event.

== Background ==
This marked the promotion's debut in Russia. The original venue was VTB Arena, but the promotion announced the change of venue to Mytishchi Arena on the week of the event.

A catchweight bout between former UFC Middleweight Champion Khamzat Chimaev and former UFC Welterweight Champion Tyron Woodley headlined the event.

In addition, three championship bouts took place:

- An RAF Light Heavyweight Championship rematch between current champion (also 2016 Olympic gold medalist) Kyle Snyder and 2024 Olympic gold medalist Akhmed Tazhudinov. Snyder defeated Tazhudinov at RAF 07 by criteria decision in March 2026 to claim the vacant title. Snyder previously lost to Tazhudinov at the 2024 Summer Olympics in the semi-finals as well as the 2023 World Wrestling Championships.
- An RAF Cruiserweight Championship rematch between champion Kyle Dake and Arsenii Dzhioev was scheduled for the event, but Dzhioev withdrew and was replaced by 2020 Summer Olympics silver medallist in men's 74 kg Mahamedkhabib Kadzimahamedau. They previously met at RAF 05, when Dake won by decision. Dake previously lost to Kadzimahamedau in the quarterfinals of the 2020 Summer Olympics.
- An RAF Women's Middleweight Championship bout between current champion (also 2024 Olympic silver medalist) Kennedy Blades and Vusala Parfianovich.

A catchweight bout between Sharabutdin Magomedov and former Bellator Middleweight World Champion Alexander Shlemenko was scheduled for this event. However, Shlemenko withdrew from the fight for unknown reasons and was replaced by Neiman Gracie.

== Fight card ==
Main card
| Weight class | | | | Method | Round | Time | Notes |
|---|---|---|---|---|---|---|---|
| Catchweight | (United Arab Emirates) Khamzat Chimaev | def. | (United States) Tyron Woodley | Pinfall | 1 | 1:34 |
| Light Heavyweight | (Russia) Abdulrashid Sadulaev | def. | (United States) Zac Braunagel | Decision (8-6) | 3 | 2:00 |
| Cruiserweight | (United States) Zahid Valencia | def. | (Russia) Ibragim Kadiev | Decision (9-5) | 3 | 2:00 |
| Cruiserweight | (Russia) Sharabutdin Magomedov | def. | (Brazil) Neiman Gracie | Decision (11-3) | 3 | 2:00 |
| Light Heavyweight | (United States) Kyle Snyder (c) | def. | (Bahrain) Akhmed Tazhudinov | Decision (11-5) | 3 | 2:00 | (Note: For the RAF Light Heavyweight Championship.) |
| Cruiserweight | (United States) Kyle Dake (c) | def. | (Belarus) Mahamedkhabib Kadzimahamedau | Decision (7-6) | 3 | 2:00 | (Note: For the RAF Cruiserweight Championship.) |
| Middleweight | (United States) Jordan Burroughs | def. | (Russia) Magomed Kurbanaliev | Technical fall (10-0) | 3 | 0:35 |
| Women's Middleweight | (United States) Kennedy Blades (c) | def. | (Russia) Vusala Parfianovich | Technical fall (10-0) | 1 | 1:31 | (Note: For the RAF Women's Middleweight Championship.) |
| Light Heavyweight | (United States) Bo Nickal | def. | (Russia) Shirvani Muradov | Decision (11-8) | 3 | 2:00 |
| Catchweight | (United States) Jason Nolf | def. | (Russia) Ismail Khaniev | Decision (criteria) (5-5) | 3 | 2:00 |
| Heavyweight | (Iran) Pouya Rahmani | def. | (Russia) Anatoly Malykhin | Decision (10-3) | 3 | 2:00 |
| Middleweight | (Russia) Yusuf Raisov | def. | (Russia) Marif Piraev | Technical fall (12-2) | 2 | 0:39 |
| Featherweight | (United States) Vito Arujau | def. | (Russia) Soslan Ramonov | Technical fall (13-3) | 3 | 0:11 |

== Bonus awards ==
The following athletes received bonuses.

- Match of the Night: Kyle Dake vs. Mahamedkhabib Kadzimahamedau and Jason Nolf vs. Ismail Khaniev
- Performance of the Night: Vito Arujau

== See also ==
- List of RAF events
