= RAF 16 =

Upcoming 2026 wrestling event

RAF 16: Chimaev vs. Evans
- Promotion: Real American Freestyle
- Date: December 19, 2026
- Venue: Nassau Coliseum
- City: Uniondale, New York, United States

Event chronology
RAF 15: Cejudo vs. Song	RAF 16: Chimaev vs. Evans

RAF 16: Chimaev vs. Evans is an upcoming freestyle wrestling event produced by the Real American Freestyle (RAF) promotion that is scheduled to take place on December 19, 2026, at the Nassau Coliseum in Uniondale, New York.

== Background ==
This will mark the promotion's debut in New York.

An RAF Light Heavyweight Crossover Championship between current champion Khamzat Chimaev (also former UFC Middleweight Champion) vs. former UFC Light Heavyweight Champion (also The Ultimate Fighter 2 Heavyweight Tournament Winner) Rashad Evans is scheduled to headline the event.

An RAF Lightweight Championship between champion Ridge Lovett and Jacori Teemer is scheduled to take place at the event.

A catchweight bout between former RAF Light Heavyweight Champion Bo Nickal and former interim champion Yoel Romero (also former UFC Middleweight Championship challenger) is scheduled for the event. They were formerly scheduled to compete at RAF 04 in December 2025 but Nickal withdrew for undisclosed reasons. They were scheduled to compete again at RAF 05 in January 2026 but Romero missed weight resulting in the cancellation of the bout.

== Fight card ==
Main card
Weight class				Method	Round	Time	Notes
Light Heavyweight	(United Arab Emirates) Khamzat Chimaev (c)	vs.	(United States) Rashad Evans				(Note: For the RAF Light Heavyweight Crossover Championship.)
Catchweight	(United States) Bo Nickal	vs.	(Cuba) Yoel Romero
Lightweight	(Georgia (country)) Merab Dvalishvili	vs.	(Netherlands) Kenzo Biyong
Light Heavyweight	(Russia) Abdulrashid Sadulaev	vs.	(United States) Trent Hidlay
Lightweight	(United States) Sean O'Malley	vs.	(Brazil) Marlon Moraes
Lightweight	(United States) Zain Retherford	vs.	(Bulgaria) Shamil Mamedov
Lightweight	(United States) Jimmie Rivera	vs.	(Mexico) Raul Rosas Jr.
Cruiserweight	(Dominican Republic) Chris Foca	vs.	(Bulgaria) Magomed Ramazanov
Welterweight	(United States) Quincy Monday	vs.	(Russia) David Baev
Catchweight	(United States) Jayden James	vs.	(Slovakia) Tajmuraz Salkazanov
Lightweight	(United States) Ridge Lovett (c)	vs.	(United States) Jacori Teemer				(Note: For the RAF Lightweight Championship.)

== See also ==
- List of RAF events
