= RAF 15 =

Upcoming 2026 wrestling event

RAF 15: Cejudo vs. Song
- The poster for RAF 15: Cejudo vs. Song
- Promotion: Real American Freestyle
- Date: November 28, 2026
- Venue: Now Arena
- City: Chicago, Illinois, United States

Event chronology
RAF Abu Dhabi: Chimaev vs. Weidman	RAF 15: Cejudo vs. Song	RAF 16: Chimaev vs. Evans

RAF 15: Cejudo vs. Song is an upcoming freestyle wrestling event produced by the Real American Freestyle (RAF) promotion that is scheduled to take place on November 28, 2026, at the Now Arena in Chicago, Illinois.

== Background ==
This will mark the promotion's second event in Chicago and first since RAF 03 in November 2025.

An RAF Lightweight Crossover Championship bout between champion and former UFC Flyweight and Bantamweight Champion (also 2008 Olympic gold medalist in freestyle wrestling) Henry Cejudo and promotional newcomer Song Yadong is scheduled to headline the event. However, on October 27, this was shifted to the co-main event after the announcement of the new main event. In turn, the match was moved to headline again for undisclosed reasons. Cejudo and Song previously competed in mixed martial arts at UFC Fight Night: Cejudo vs. Song in February 2025 where an accidental eyepoke by Song at the beginning of the fourth round rendered Cejudo unable to continue, resulting in Song winning the fight by technical decision after the bout was stopped.

An RAF Middleweight Crossover Championship bout between champion Arman Tsarukyan and former UFC Lightweight Champion Anthony Pettis is scheduled to co-headline the event. Pettis was originally scheduled to face Donald Cerrone in a cruiserweight bout, but Cerrone was removed from the card and Pettis was instead booked against Tsarukyan for the title in the main event. However, for undisclosed reasons, Cejudo vs. Song was moved back to the main event.

An RAF Welterweight Championship bout between Michael Caliendo and Cesar Alvan for the vacant title is scheduled to take place at the event. Former champion David Carr was stripped off his title due to inactivity.

In addition, three championship bouts are scheduled to take place:

- An RAF Featherweight Crossover Championship bout between champion Cayden Henschel and Conor Beebe.
- An RAF Featherweight Championship bout between champion Real Woods and Sebastian Rivera.
- An RAF Women's Middleweight Championship bout between champion Kennedy Blades (also 2024 Olympic silver medalist) and Alexis Gomez.

Raul Rosas Jr. was scheduled to debut against Clay Guida in a lightweight bout. However, the bout was cancelled for undisclosed reasons and Guida was matched with Lucas Valente.

== Fight card ==
Main card
Weight class				Method	Round	Time	Notes
Lightweight	(United States) Henry Cejudo (c)	vs.	(China) Song Yadong				(Note: For the RAF Lightweight Crossover Championship.)
Middleweight	(Armenia) Arman Tsarukyan (c)	vs.	(United States) Anthony Pettis				(Note: For the RAF Middleweight Crossover Championship.)
Women's Middleweight	(United States) Kennedy Blades (c)	vs.	(Mexico) Alexis Gomez				(Note: For the RAF Women's Middleweight Championship.)
Featherweight	(United States) Real Woods (c)	vs.	(Puerto Rico) Sebastian Rivera				(Note: For the RAF Featherweight Championship.)
Featherweight	(United States) Sergio Pettis	vs.	(United States) Cody Garbrandt
Bantamweight	(Mexico) Roman Bravo-Young	vs.	(Philippines) Matt Ramos
Cruiserweight	(United States) Chance Marsteller	vs.	(Russia) Akhmed Usmanov
Lightweight	(Mexico) Raul Rosas Jr.	vs.	(United States) Clay Guida
Welterweight	(United States) Michael Caliendo	vs.	(United States) Cesar Alvan				(Note: For the vacant RAF Welterweight Championship.)
Heavyweight	(Georgia (country)) Geno Petriashvili	vs.	(Cuba) Yonger Bastida				(Note: RAF Heavyweight title eliminator.)
Women's Bantamweight	(United States) Haley Augello	vs.	(United States) Miranda Maverick
Featherweight	(United States) Cayden Henschel (c)	vs.	(United States) Conor Beebe				(Note: For the RAF Featherweight Crossover Championship.)
Lightweight	(United States) Danny Sabatello	vs.	(United States) Jacob Schultz
Lightweight	(United States) Clay Guida	vs.	(United States) Lucas Valente

== See also ==
- List of RAF events
