= RAF 13 =

Upcoming 2026 wrestling event

RAF 13: Covington vs. Muhammad
- The poster for RAF 13: Covington vs. Muhammad
- Promotion: Real American Freestyle
- Date: September 18, 2026
- Venue: Watsco Center
- City: Miami, Florida

Event chronology
RAF Moscow: Chimaev vs. Woodley	RAF 13: Covington vs. Muhammad	RAF 14: Tsarukyan vs. Danis

RAF 13: Covington vs. Muhammad was a freestyle wrestling event produced by the Real American Freestyle (RAF) promotion that took place on September 18, 2026, at the Watsco Center in Miami, Florida.

== Background ==
RAF returned to Miami for the first time since RAF 05 in January 2026.

An RAF Cruiserweight Crossover Championship bout between current champion Colby Covington (also former interim UFC Welterweight Champion) and former UFC Welterweight Champion Belal Muhammad headlined the event. The bout was originally scheduled for RAF 12 on August 22, 2026, but was shifted to headline this event due to scheduling changes within the promotion.

A catchweight bout between former UFC Middleweight Champion Khamzat Chimaev and former UFC Middleweight Championship challenger Gilbert Burns served as the co-main event. They previously fought in mixed martial arts at UFC 273, a bout which many media outlets, including UFC CEO Dana White, called "Fight of the Year." Chimaev won that contest by unanimous decision.

Three other championship bouts took place at the event:

- An RAF Middleweight Championship bout between current champion Jason Nolf and Julian Ramirez. Nolf previously defeated Ramirez by technical fall in April 2023 at the "2023 US Open National Championships".
- An RAF Featherweight Crossover Championship bout for the inaugural title between Johnni DiJulius and Cayden Henschel.
- An RAF Women's Middleweight Championship bout between current champion Kennedy Blades and Diana Avsaragova. They previously was scheduled to meet at RAF 12, but Avsaragova withdrew.
- An RAF Bantamweight Championship bout between current champion Austin DeSanto and Arsen Harutyunyan.

An RAF Heavyweight Championship bout between reigning champion Wyatt Hendrickson and Greg Kerkvliet was scheduled for the event. However, due to the injury of one of the athletes, the bout was postponed. Hendrickson defeated Kerkvliet in April 2026 at the 2026 US Open National Championships via technical fall, but previously lost to Kerkvliet at the 2024 US Olympic Team Trials. Furthermore, Hendrickson and Kerkvliet also met twice in college, with the pair splitting those matches as well.

A catchweight bout between Larry Wheels and Michael Holston was originally scheduled for this event. However, Wheels withdrew due to injury and was replaced by Keelon "Mugzy" Jimison.

RAF Undiscovered 1 winner Jeremiah Moody faced Cesar Alvan in a middleweight bout.

== Fight card ==
Main card
Weight class				Method	Round	Time	Notes
Cruiserweight	(United States) Colby Covington (c)	def.	(Palestine) Belal Muhammad	Technical fall (10-0)	2	1:23	(Note: For the RAF Cruiserweight Crossover Championship.)
Catchweight	(United Arab Emirates) Khamzat Chimaev	def.	(Brazil) Gilbert Burns	Technical fall (15-4)	2	0:47
Women's Middleweight	(United States) Kennedy Blades (c)	def.	(Russia) Diana Avsaragova	Technical fall (12-0)	1	1:49	(Note: For the RAF Women's Middleweight Championship.)
Bantamweight	(Armenia) Arsen Harutyunyan	def.	(United States) Austin DeSanto (c)	Decision (6-3)	3	2:00	(Note: For the RAF Bantamweight Championship.)
Welterweight	(Russia) Timur Bizhoev	def.	(United States) Michael Caliendo	Decision (5-4)	3	2:00
Catchweight	(United States) Joe Pyfer	def.	(United States) Luke Rockhold	Technical fall (14-3)	2	1:45
Middleweight	(United States) Jason Nolf (c)	def.	(United States) Julian Ramirez	Decision (7-6)	3	2:00	(Note: For the RAF Middleweight Championship.)
Cruiserweight	(United States) Chance Marsteller	def.	(Greece) Georgios Kougioumtsidis	Decision (8-6)	3	2:00
Welterweight	(United States) Bryce Meredith	def.	(Russia) Movlid Khaybulaev	Decision (17-13)	3	2:00
Featherweight	(United States) Cayden Henschel	def.	(United States) Johnni DiJulius	Decision (7-2)	3	2:00	(Note: For the inaugural RAF Featherweight Crossover Championship.)
Lightweight	(United States) Jacori Teemer	def.	(Azerbaijan) Haji Aliyev	Decision (9-6)	3	2:00
Middleweight	(Brazil) Cesar Alvan	def.	(United States) Jeremiah Moody	Pinfall	2	0:19
Catchweight	(United States) Keelon Jimison	def.	(United States) Michael Holston	Pinfall	2	1:23

== Bonus awards ==
The following athletes received bonuses.

- Match of the Night: Keelon Jimison vs. Mike Holston
- Performance of the Night: Arsen Harutyunyan
- Flight of the Night: Chance Marsteller

== See also ==
- List of RAF events
