= RAF 09 =

2026 wrestling event

RAF 09: Steveson vs. Romanov
- The poster for RAF 09: Steveson vs. Romanov
- Promotion: Real American Freestyle
- Date: May 30, 2026
- Venue: College Park Center
- City: Arlington, Texas
- Attendance: 3,252

Event chronology
RAF 08: Tsarukyan vs. Faber	RAF 09: Steveson vs. Romanov	RAF 10: Chimaev vs. Danis

RAF 09: Steveson vs. Romanov was a freestyle wrestling event produced by the Real American Freestyle (RAF) promotion that took place on May 30, 2026, at the College Park Center in Arlington, Texas.

== Background ==
The event was headlined by a heavyweight bout between 2020 Summer Olympic gold medalist (also three-time age-group world champion) Gable Steveson and Alexander Romanov.

A catchweight 200 pound bout between former interim UFC Welterweight Champion Colby Covington and former UFC Middleweight Champion Chris Weidman served as the co-main event.

An RAF Light Heavyweight Championship bout between reigning champion Kyle Snyder and Georgian world medalist Givi Matcharashvili took place at the event. They competed two other times with Snyder winning in April 2018 and December 2022.

An RAF Featherweight Championship bout between champion Real Woods and Ibragim Ilyasov also took place at the event.

2021 U23 World Wrestling Championships' Men's freestyle 70 kg gold medalist Ernazar Akmataliev was scheduled to face two-time Dan Hodge Trophy winner Zain Retherford (also three-time NCAA Division I National champion and Pan-American champion). However, Akmataliev had to withdraw due to visa issues causing the match to be postponed to RAF Georgia in July 2026, so he was replaced by Antrell Taylor.

== Results ==
Main card (Fox Nation)
Weight class				Method	Round	Time	Notes
Heavyweight	(United States) Gable Steveson	def.	(Moldova) Alexander Romanov	Technical fall (10–0)	2	1:07
Catchweight (200 lb)	(United States) Colby Covington	def.	(United States) Chris Weidman	Decision (5–4)	3	2:00
Light Heavyweight	(United States) Kyle Snyder (c)	def.	(Georgia (country)) Givi Matcharashvili	Technical fall (10–0)	3	0:41	(Note: For the RAF Light Heavyweight Championship.)
Lightweight	(Georgia (country)) Merab Dvalishvili	def.	(United States) Frankie Edgar	Technical fall (12–1)	3	1:34
Featherweight	(United States) Real Woods (c)	def.	(Russia) Ibragim Ilyasov	Pinfall	1	2:11	(Note: For the RAF Featherweight Championship.)
Middleweight	(United States) Jason Nolf	def.	(Jamaica) Christopher Minto	Decision (10–5)	3	2:00
Cruiserweight	(United States) Parker Keckeisen	def.	(Greece) Georgios Kougioumtsidis	Decision (8–5)	3	2:00
Lightweight	(United States) Zain Retherford	def.	(United States) Antrell Taylor	Decision (8–0)	3	2:00
Lightweight	(United States) Ridge Lovett	def.	(India) Bajrang Punia	Decision (13–8)	3	2:00	(Note: RAF Lightweight title eliminator.)
Catchweight (120 lb)	(Ecuador) Lucia Yepez	def.	(United States) Cameron Guerin	Technical fall (10–0)	1	1:48
Middleweight	(Armenia) Arman Tsarukyan	def.	(United States) Keelon Jimison	Technical fall (16–5)	1	1:56

== Bonus awards ==
The following athletes received bonuses.

- Match of the Night: Parker Keckeisen vs. Georgios Kougioumtsidis and Jason Nolf vs. Christopher Minto
- Performance of the Night: Merab Dvalishvili

== See also ==
- List of RAF events
