= RAF Abu Dhabi =

Upcoming 2026 wrestling event

RAF Abu Dhabi: Chimaev vs. Weidman
- The poster for RAF Abu Dhabi: Chimaev vs. Weidman
- Promotion: Real American Freestyle
- Date: November 14, 2026
- Venue: Etihad Arena
- City: Abu Dhabi, United Arab Emirates

Event chronology
RAF 14: Tsarukyan vs. Danis	RAF Abu Dhabi: Chimaev vs. Weidman	RAF 15: Cejudo vs. Song

RAF Abu Dhabi: Chimaev vs. Weidman was a freestyle wrestling event produced by the Real American Freestyle (RAF) promotion that took place on November 14, 2026, at the Etihad Arena in Abu Dhabi, United Arab Emirates.

== Background ==
This marked the promotion's debut in Abu Dhabi.

An RAF Cruiserweight Crossover Championship bout between champion (also former interim UFC Welterweight Champion) Colby Covington and former UFC Middleweight Champion Khamzat Chimaev was scheduled to headline the event. However, during fight week, Covington withdrew due to an injury and was replaced by former UFC Middleweight Champion Chris Weidman. The bout was then contested for the inaugural RAF Light Heavyweight Crossover Championship.

In addition, three championship bouts took place:

- An RAF Light Heavyweight Championship bout between champion Kyle Snyder and Shamil Erdogan.
- An RAF Cruiserweight Championship bout between champion Kyle Dake (also five-time World Champion) and Alp Arslan Begenjov.
- An RAF Women's Middleweight Championship bout between champion Kennedy Blades (also 2024 Olympic silver medalist) and Bella Mir.

A lightweight bout between Ali AlQaisi and Hamza Kooheji was scheduled for this event, but the match was removed from the card for undisclosed reasons.

Former WEC Featherweight Champion Urijah Faber was originally scheduled to face former UFC Bantamweight Championship title challenger Umar Nurmagomedov in a catchweight bout, but Nurmagomedov was removed from the card and replaced by Saba Lazishvili.

== Fight card ==
Main card
Weight class				Method	Round	Time	Notes
Light Heavyweight	(United Arab Emirates) Khamzat Chimaev	def.	(United States) Chris Weidman	Technical fall (10-0)	2	0:13	(Note: For the inaugural RAF Light Heavyweight Crossover Championship.)
Catchweight	(Armenia) Arman Tsarukyan	def.	(Brazil) Neiman Gracie	Technical fall (10-0)	1	1:56
Catchweight	(Russia) Zabit Magomedsharipov	def.	(Georgia (country)) Giga Chikadze	Pinfall	2	1:06
Light Heavyweight	(Russia) Abdulrashid Sadulaev	def.	(Greece) Dauren Kurugliev	Decision (8-5)	3	2:00
Cruiserweight	(United States) Kyle Dake (c)	def.	(Turkmenistan) Alp Arslan Begenjov	Technical fall (10-0)	3	1:48	(Note: For the RAF Cruiserweight Championship.)
Catchweight	(Georgia (country)) Saba Lazishvili	def.	(United States) Urijah Faber	Decision (12-7)	3	2:00
Middleweight	(United States) Jordan Burroughs	def.	(Belarus) Azamat Nurykau	Decision (9-0)	3	2:00
Light Heavyweight	(United States) Kyle Snyder (c)	def.	(Turkey) Shamil Erdogan	Technical fall (11-0)	3	0:45	(Note: For the RAF Light Heavyweight Championship.)
Light Heavyweight	(Bahrain) Murtaza Talha	def.	(Egypt) Osama Elsaidy	Decision (10-4)	3	2:00
Women's Middleweight	(Russia) Diana Avsaragova	def.	(United States) Julianna Peña	Pinfall	1	1:33
Welterweight	(Georgia (country)) Merab Dvalishvili	def.	(Brazil) Marlon Moraes	Pinfall	1	1:30
Cruiserweight	(United States) Zahid Valencia	def.	(Bahrain) Khidir Saipudinov	Decision (4-2)	3	2:00
Women's Middleweight	(United States) Kennedy Blades (c)	def.	(United States) Bella Mir	Technical fall (10-0)	1	1:30	(Note: For the RAF Women's Middleweight Championship.)

== Bonus awards ==
The following athletes received bonuses.

- Match of the Night: Abdulrashid Sadulaev vs. Dauren Kurugliev
- Performance of the Night: Saba Lazishvili
- Flight of the Night: Jordan Burroughs

== See also ==
- List of RAF events
