= RAF 06 =

2026 wrestling event

RAF 06: Cejudo vs. Faber
- The poster for RAF 06: Cejudo vs. Faber
- Promotion: Real American Freestyle
- Date: February 28, 2026
- Venue: Mullett Arena
- City: Tempe, Arizona
- Attendance: 3,516

Event chronology
RAF 05: Covington vs. Rockhold	RAF 06: Cejudo vs. Faber	RAF 07: Tsarukyan vs. Poullas 2

RAF 06: Cejudo vs. Faber was a freestyle wrestling event that took place on February 28, 2026, at the Mullett Arena of Arizona State University in Tempe, Arizona.

It was the sixth flagship event produced by the Real American Freestyle (RAF) promotion, and aired live on Fox Nation.

== Background ==
A bantamweight bout between former UFC Flyweight and Bantamweight Champion (also 2008 Olympic gold medalist in freestyle wrestling) Henry Cejudo and former WEC Featherweight Champion (also former UFC Bantamweight Championship challenger Urijah Faber headlined the event. Cejudo headlined the event just weeks after his UFC retirement.

Tickets for the event went on sale through Ticketmaster on January 2, 2026.

Commentary for the event's live Fox Nation broadcast was provided by Kurt Angle, Ben Askren, Cyrus Fees, Julianna Peña, and Chael Sonnen.

Keegan O'Toole was originally announced to be facing Evan Wick, but both men were rebooked against different opponents. Frank Chamizo was announced as O’Toole’s new opponent, but Chamizo was subsequently replaced by Tajmuraz Salkazanov.

Bryce Meredith was scheduled to face Muhammad Mokaev, but Mokaev withdrew and was replaced by Andrew Alirez.

Benson Henderson was scheduled to face Chad Mendes, but Mendes withdrew due to injury and was replaced by Aljamain Sterling.

Nate Carr was awarded an honorary RAF Legends Championship during the broadcast.

Keelon Jimison, Givi Matcharashvili, and Tajmuraz Salkazanov won their matches despite being favored to lose by sportsbooks.

== Results ==
Main card (Fox Nation)
Weight class				Method	Round	Time	Notes
Lightweight	(United States) Henry Cejudo	def.	(United States) Urijah Faber	Technical fall (11–0)	3	1:41
Middleweight	(Armenia) Arman Tsarukyan	def.	(United States) Georgio Poullas	Decision (5–3)	3	2:00
Catchweight (170 lb)	(United States) Aljamain Sterling	def.	(United States) Benson Henderson	Pinfall	3	0:52
Welterweight	(United States) David Carr (c)	def.	(United States) Bubba Jenkins	Technical fall (13–2)	2	1:27	(Note: For the RAF Welterweight Championship.)
Featherweight	(United States) Andrew Alirez	def.	(United States) Bryce Meredith	Technical fall (13–2)	2	1:38
Light Heavyweight	(Georgia (country)) Givi Matcharashvili	def.	(United States) Stephen Buchanan	Decision (criteria) (3–3)	3	2:00	(Note: RAF Light Heavyweight title eliminator.)
Women's Strawweight	(Ecuador) Lucía Yépez	def.	(United States) Everest Leydecker	Decision (10–3)	3	2:00	(Note: RAF Women's Strawweight title eliminator.)
Middleweight	(Slovakia) Tajmuraz Salkazanov	def.	(United States) Keegan O'Toole	Decision (9–0)	3	2:00
Middleweight	(United States) Evan Wick	def.	(Belarus) Mahamedkhabib Kadzimahamedau	Technical fall (13–2)	3	1:55
Cruiserweight	(United States) Zahid Valencia	def.	(Egypt) Mahmoud Fawzy	Technical fall (10–0)	1	1:32
Featherweight	(United States) Jordan Oliver	def.	(United States) Beau Bartlett	Decision (5–3)	3	2:00
Welterweight	(United States) Keelon Jimison	def.	(United States) Clay Guida	Technical fall (13–3)	2	1:29

== Bonus awards ==
The following athletes received bonuses.

- Match of the Night: Givi Matcharashvili vs. Stephen Buchanan and Evan Wick vs. Mahamedkhabib Kadzimahamedau
- Performance of the Night: Evan Wick

== See also ==
- List of RAF events
