= RAF 03 =

2025 wrestling event

RAF 03: Mendes vs. Chandler
- The poster for RAF 03: Mendes vs. Chandler
- Promotion: Real American Freestyle
- Date: November 29, 2025
- Venue: Wintrust Arena
- City: Chicago, Illinois
- Attendance: 5,000

Event chronology
RAF 02: Dake vs. Makoev	RAF 03: Mendes vs. Chandler	RAF 04: Hendrickson vs. Parris

RAF 03: Mendes vs. Chandler was a freestyle wrestling event that took place on November 29, 2025 at the Wintrust Arena in Chicago, Illinois.

It was the third flagship event produced by the Real American Freestyle (RAF) promotion, and aired live on Fox Nation.

== Background ==
A middleweight bout between former three-time Bellator Lightweight World Champion (also a former UFC lightweight title challenger) Michael Chandler and former UFC Featherweight Championship challenger Chad Mendes headlined the event.

Tickets for the event went on sale through Ticketmaster on October 24, 2025.

Commentary for the event's live Fox Nation broadcast was provided by Kurt Angle, Cyrus Fees, Julianna Peña, and Chael Sonnen.

Virginia Tech Hokies prospect Bo Bassett debuted at the event, making him the first active high school wrestler to compete in RAF.

Corey Anderson suffered an injury prior to the event, and was replaced by Joaquin Buckley.

Mahamedkhabib Kadzimahamedau appeared during the broadcast and challenged RAF Cruiserweight Champion Kyle Dake to a future match, which took place at RAF 05.

It was the first RAF event with matches available for betting through major sportsbooks. Alexis Gomez, Jordan Oliver, and Andriy Yatsenko won their matches despite being favored to lose.

== Results ==
Main card (Fox Nation)
Weight class				Method	Round	Time	Notes
Middleweight	(United States) Michael Chandler	def.	(United States) Chad Mendes	Decision (4–1)	3	2:00
Women's Middleweight	(United States) Kennedy Blades	def.	(Mexico) Alejandra Rivera	Technical fall (11–0)	2	1:18	(Note: For the inaugural RAF Women's Middleweight Championship.)
Heavyweight	(Bahrain) Akhmed Tazhudinov	def.	(United States) Anthony Cassioppi	Pinfall	2	1:39
Bantamweight	(Ukraine) Andriy Yatsenko	def.	(United States) Spencer Lee	Pinfall	3	1:59
Lightweight	(Mexico) Austin Gomez	def.	(United States) Austin O'Connor	Decision (9–1)	3	2:00	(Note: RAF Lightweight title eliminator.)
Featherweight	(United States) Jordan Oliver	def.	(United States) Real Woods (c)	Decision (criteria) (2–2)	3	2:00	(Note: For the RAF Featherweight Championship.)
Catchweight (160 lbs.)	(United States) Cayden Henschel	def.	(United States) Clay Guida	Technical fall (11–0)	3	0:37
Light Heavyweight	(United States) Pat Downey	def.	(United States) Joaquin Buckley	Technical fall (12–0)	1	1:13
Women's Middleweight	(Mexico) Alexis Gomez	def.	(United States) Bella Mir	Decision (7–3)	3	2:00
Featherweight	(United States) Bo Bassett	def.	(United States) Darrion Caldwell	Pinfall	1	1:00

== Bonus awards ==
The following athletes received bonuses.

- Match of the Night: Alexis Gomez vs. Bella Mir

== See also ==
- List of RAF events
