= RAF 07 =

2026 wrestling event

RAF 07: Tsarukyan vs. Poullas 2
- The poster for RAF 07: Tsarukyan vs. Poullas 2
- Promotion: Real American Freestyle
- Date: March 28, 2026
- Venue: Yuengling Center
- City: Tampa, Florida
- Attendance: 3,789

Event chronology
RAF 06: Cejudo vs. Faber	RAF 07: Tsarukyan vs. Poullas 2	RAF 08: Tsarukyan vs. Faber

RAF 07: Tsarukyan vs. Poullas 2 was a freestyle wrestling event produced by the Real American Freestyle (RAF) promotion. The event took place on March 28, 2026, at the Yuengling Center in Tampa, Florida.

== Background ==
A middleweight rematch between Arman Tsarukyan and Georgio Poullas headlined the event. The bout served as a sequel to their first meeting at RAF 06, where Tsarukyan secured a decisive victory.

The event was co-headlined by a cruiserweight bout between former interim UFC Welterweight Champion Colby Covington and Dillon Danis.

In addition, four championship bouts took place:

- An RAF Heavyweight Championship bout between reigning champion Wyatt Hendrickson and Trent Hillger. They competed before in April 2025 and twice in June 2025 with Hendrickson winning all matches.
- An RAF Cruiserweight Championship bout between champion Kyle Dake and Parker Keckeisen. They competed two separate times before in April 2025 and May 2025 with Dake winning both matches.
- An RAF Light Heavyweight Championship bout for the vacant title between Kyle Snyder and Akhmed Tazhudinov. Snyder previously lost to Tazhudinov at the 2024 Summer Olympics in the semi-finals as well as the 2023 World Wrestling Championships. Former champion Bo Nickal was stripped of the title on February 27, 2026, after the weight class changed from 205 pounds to 215 pounds.
- An RAF Women's Middleweight Championship bout between current champion (also 2024 Summer Olympics silver medalist Kennedy Blades and Milana Dudieva.

Three-time NCAA Division I national champion Jason Nolf was scheduled to face Tajmuraz Salkazanov, but Salkazanov withdrew and was replaced by David Mistulov.

2020 Navy and Marine Corps Medal recipient (2020) and two-time NCHSAA champion Ryan Blackwell was awarded an honorary RAF Legends Championship during the broadcast.

== Results ==
Main card (Fox Nation)
Weight class				Method	Round	Time	Notes
Middleweight	(Armenia) Arman Tsarukyan	def.	(United States) Georgio Poullas	Decision (9–3)	3	2:00
Cruiserweight	(United States) Colby Covington	def.	(United States) Dillon Danis	Technical fall (14–4)	1	1:39
Middleweight	(United States) Kyle Dake (c)	def.	(United States) Parker Keckeisen	Decision (7–1)	3	2:00	(Note: For the RAF Cruiserweight Championship.)
Light Heavyweight	(United States) Kyle Snyder	def.	(Bahrain) Akhmed Tazhudinov	Decision (criteria) (3–3)	3	2:00	(Note: For the vacant RAF Light Heavyweight Championship.)
Heavyweight	(United States) Wyatt Hendrickson (c)	def.	(United States) Trent Hillger	Decision (6–2)	3	2:00	(Note: For the RAF Heavyweight Championship.)
Women's Middleweight	(United States) Kennedy Blades (c)	def.	(Russia) Milana Dudieva	Technical fall (11–0)	1	1:22	(Note: For the RAF Women's Middleweight Championship.)
Featherweight	(United States) Bo Bassett	def.	(Georgia (country)) Vladimer Khinchegashvili	Technical fall (13–3)	2	0:57
Cruiserweight	(United States) Aeoden Sinclair	def.	(Bahrain) Khidir Saipudinov	Decision (9–4)	3	2:00
Middleweight	(United States) Jason Nolf	def.	(Russia) David Mistulov	Technical fall (10–0)	1	1:33
Light Heavyweight	(United States) Trent Hidlay	def.	(United States) Pat Downey	Technical fall (12–0)	1	1:28
Featherweight	(United States) Johnni DiJulius	def.	(United States) Connor Beebe	Decision (9–6)	3	2:00

== Bonus awards ==
The following athletes received bonuses.

- Match of the Night: Bo Bassett vs. Vladimer Khinchegashvili
- Performance of the Night: Kyle Snyder

== See also ==
- List of RAF events
