= Evan Wick =

American wrestler (born 1997)

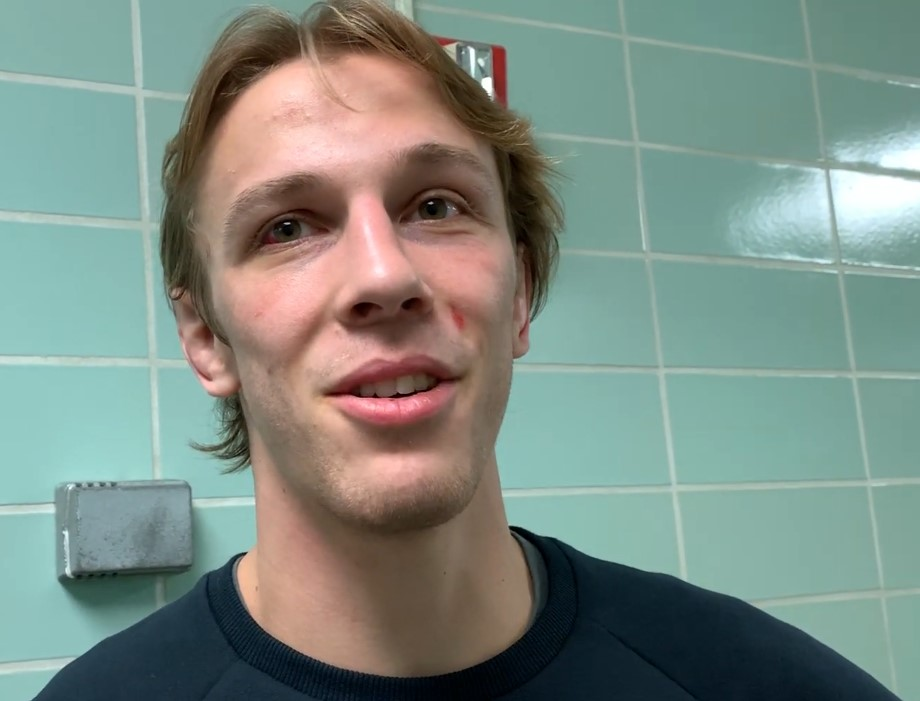
- Wick in 2019

Personal information
- Born: January 10, 1997 (age 29) Fontana, California, U.S.
- Height: 6 ft 2 in (188 cm)
- Weight: 79 kg (174 lb)
- Website: evanwickwrestling.com

Sport
- Country: United States
- Sport: Wrestling
- Events: Freestyle and Folkstyle
- College team: Cal Poly (2021–2022); Wisconsin (2016–2020)
- Club: Titan Mercury
- Coached by: John Azevedo
- Now coaching: Cal Poly (assistant)
Medal record
Men's freestyle wrestling
Representing the United States
Pan American Wrestling Championships
Gold medal – first place	2025 Monterrey	79 kg
Zagreb Open
Bronze medal – third place	2026 Zagreb	79 kg
Bronze medal – third place	2024 Zagreb	79 kg

Evan Wick (born January 10, 1997) is an American freestyle and folkstyle wrestler who competes at 79 kilograms. He is currently assistant coach for the Cal Poly Mustangs.

Wick was a California state champion in high school wrestling. He was a four-time NCAA All-American in collegiate wrestling. At the international level, he is a former winner of the Pan American Wrestling Championships (2025).

He is currently signed to the Middleweight division of Real American Freestyle (RAF), where he was the inaugural RAF Middleweight Champion.

== High school career ==
Wick wrestled for San Marino High School, winning the California state championship at 152 lbs. his senior year in 2016. His twin brother and teammate Zander Wick won the state championship at 145 lbs. that same season.

The National Wrestling Hall of Fame presented Wick with the 2016 Dave Schultz High School Excellence Award.

== College career ==
Wick committed to the University of Wisconsin alongside his brother, Zander.

He placed 3rd at 165 lbs. in the 2018 NCAA Division I Wrestling Championships, and was named an NCAA All-American in 2018 and 2019.

After receiving his third NCAA All-American honor in 2020, Wick transferred to California Polytechnic State University in 2021 and became teammates with his younger brother Luka Wick.

He finished 3rd at 165 lbs. in the 2022 NCAA Division I Wrestling Championships, and was named an NCAA All-American for the fourth time.

Wick ended his collegiate career with an overall record of 133–22.

== International career ==
He was eliminated in the 74 kg semifinals of the 2020 United States Olympic trials by Kyle Dake.

Wick won bronze in the 79 kg division of the 2024 Grand Prix Zagreb Open, losing in the semifinals to Mohammad Nokhodi before defeating Abdollah Sheikhazami.

He was eliminated in the 86 kg second round of the 2024 United States Olympic trials by Chance Marsteller.

Wick won gold in the 79 kg finals of the 2025 Pan American Wrestling Championships, defeating Shane Jones by technical fall.

At the 2025 US Open Championships, he defeated Dean Hamiti in the 79 kg finals to qualify for Final X and a chance at joining Team USA. Wick was then defeated at Final X 2025 by Levi Haines in a best-of-three series.

He won bronze in the 79 kg division of the 2026 Grand Prix Zagreb Open, losing in the semifinals to Dean Hamiti before defeating Danny Braunagel.

== Freestyle record ==
Senior Freestyle Matches
Res.	Record	Opponent	Score	Date	Event	Location
2026 World Team Trials DNP at 74 kg
Loss		(United States) Joe Sealey	FF	May 15, 2026	2026 World Team Trials	(United States) Louisville, Kentucky
Loss	79–39	(United States) David Carr	5–6	May 15, 2026	2026 World Team Trials	(United States) Louisville, Kentucky
Win	79–38	(United States) Will Lewan	7–5	May 15, 2026	2026 World Team Trials	(United States) Louisville, Kentucky
2026 US Open (silver) at 79 kg
Loss	78–38	(United States) Chance Marsteller	3–7	April 26, 2026	2026 US Open National Championships	(United States) Las Vegas, Nevada
Win	78–37	(United States) Muhamed McBryde	7–0	April 26, 2026	2026 US Open National Championships	(United States) Las Vegas, Nevada
Win	77–37	(United States) William Henckel	5–4	April 26, 2026	2026 US Open National Championships	(United States) Las Vegas, Nevada
Win	76–37	(United States) Myles Takats	TF 10–0	April 26, 2026	2026 US Open National Championships	(United States) Las Vegas, Nevada
Win	75–37	(United States) Jonathan Kervin	TF 10–0	April 26, 2026	2026 US Open National Championships	(United States) Las Vegas, Nevada
Win	74–37	(Belarus) Mahamedkhabib Kadzimahamedau	TF 13–2	February 28, 2026	RAF 06	(United States) Tempe, Arizona
2026 Zagreb Open (bronze) at 79 kg
Win	73–37	(United States) Danny Braunagel	8–6	February 8, 2026	2026 Zagreb Open	Zagreb, Croatia
Loss	72–37	(United States) Dean Hamiti	5–6	February 8, 2026	2026 Zagreb Open	Zagreb, Croatia
Win	72–36	(India) Amit Chhikara	Fall	February 8, 2026	2026 Zagreb Open	Zagreb, Croatia
Loss	71–36	(United States) Dean Hamiti	Fall	December 20, 2025	RAF 04	(United States) Fishers, Indiana
Win	71–35	(United States) Jason Nolf	10–8	August 30, 2025	RAF 01	(United States) Cleveland, Ohio
2025 Final X (silver) at 79 kg
Loss	70–35	(United States) Levi Haines	1–6	June 14, 2025	2025 Final X	(United States) Newark, New Jersey
Loss	70–34	(United States) Levi Haines	TF 0–10	June 14, 2025	2025 Final X	(United States) Newark, New Jersey
2025 Pan-American Championships (gold) at 79 kg
Win	70-33	(Mexico) Victor Hernandez	TF 10–0	May 10, 2025	2025 Pan-American Championships	(Mexico) Monterrey
Win	69-33	(Peru) Jose Ambrocio	TF 10–0	May 10, 2025	2025 Pan-American Championships	(Mexico) Monterrey
Win	68-33	(Canada) Jasmit Phulka	TF 10–0	May 10, 2025	2025 Pan-American Championships	(Mexico) Monterrey
Win	67-33	(Puerto Rico) Shane Jones	TF 10–0	May 10, 2025	2025 Pan-American Championships	(Mexico) Monterrey
2025 US Open National Championships (gold) at 79 kg
Win	66-33	(United States) Dean Hamiti	9–1	April 23, 2025	2025 US Open National Championships	(United States) Las Vegas, Nevada
Win	65-33	(United States) Simon Ruiz	9–5	April 23, 2025	2025 US Open National Championships	(United States) Las Vegas, Nevada
Win	64-33	(United States) Ethan Riddle	8–1	April 23, 2025	2025 US Open National Championships	(United States) Las Vegas, Nevada
Win	63-33	(United States) Brandon Murray	TF 10–0	April 23, 2025	2025 US Open National Championships	(United States) Las Vegas, Nevada
Win	62-33	(United States) Trever DeVestern	TF 10–0	April 23, 2025	2025 US Open National Championships	(United States) Las Vegas, Nevada
2025 Muhamet Malo Tournament 5th at 79 kg
Loss		(North Macedonia) Ahmad Magomedov	FF	February 27, 2025	2025 Muhamet Malo Tournament	Tirana, Albania
Loss	61–33	(Russia) Gadzhimurad Alikhmaev	FF	February 27, 2025	2025 Muhamet Malo Tournament	Tirana, Albania
Win	61–32	(China) Nan Cao	7–0	February 27, 2025	2025 Muhamet Malo Tournament	Tirana, Albania
Win	60–32	(Japan) Ryunosuke Kamiya	8–0	February 27, 2025	2025 Muhamet Malo Tournament	Tirana, Albania
2025 Grand Prix Zagreb Open at 79 kg
Loss	59–32	(United States) Rocco Welsh	2–6	February 5, 2025	2025 Grand Prix Zagreb Open	Zagreb, Croatia
2024 Bill Farrell Memorial International (gold) at 79 kg
Win	59–31	(United States) Alfred Daniel	TF 10–0	November 9, 2024	2024 Bill Farrell Memorial International	(United States) New York City, New York
Win	58–31	(Canada) Koen Poirier	TF 10–0	November 9, 2024	2024 Bill Farrell Memorial International	(United States) New York City, New York
Win	57–31	(United States) Kennedy Monday	TF 10–0	November 9, 2024	2024 Bill Farrell Memorial International	(United States) New York City, New York
Win	56–31	(United States) Joey Lavallee	TF 13–2	November 9, 2024	2024 Bill Farrell Memorial International	(United States) New York City, New York
2024 World Team Trials DNP at 79 kg
Loss	55–31	(United States) Levi Haines	Fall	September 14, 2024	2024 World Team Trials	(United States) Omaha, Nebraska
Win	55–30	(United States) Joey Lavallee	TF 11–0	September 14, 2024	2024 World Team Trials	(United States) Omaha, Nebraska
Loss	54–30	(United States) Alex Dieringer	1–7	September 14, 2024	2024 World Team Trials	(United States) Omaha, Nebraska
Win	54–29	(United States) Kennedy Monday	TF 13–3	September 14, 2024	2024 World Team Trials	(United States) Omaha, Nebraska
2024 US Olympic Team Trials DNP at 86 kg
Loss	53–29	(United States) Alex Dieringer	Fall	April 19, 2024	2024 US Olympic Team Trials	(United States) State College, Pennsylvania
Win		(United States) Carter Starocci	FF	April 19, 2024	2024 US Olympic Team Trials	(United States) State College, Pennsylvania
Win	53–28	(United States) David McFadden	8–2	April 19, 2024	2024 US Olympic Team Trials	(United States) State College, Pennsylvania
Loss	52–28	(United States) Chance Marsteller	0–6	April 19, 2024	2024 US Olympic Team Trials	(United States) State College, Pennsylvania
Win	52–27	(United States) Max Dean	TF 13–1	April 19, 2024	2024 US Olympic Team Trials	(United States) State College, Pennsylvania
2024 Grand Prix Zagreb Open (bronze) at 79 kg
Win	51–27	(Iran) Abdollah Sheikhazami	Fall	January 10, 2024	2024 Grand Prix Zagreb Open	Zagreb, Croatia
Loss	50–27	(Iran) Mohammad Nokhodi	6–6	January 10, 2024	2024 Grand Prix Zagreb Open	Zagreb, Croatia
Loss	50–26	(Georgia (country)) Avtandil Kentchadze	TF 0–10	January 10, 2024	2024 Grand Prix Zagreb Open	Zagreb, Croatia
Win	50–25	(Ukraine) Denys Pavlov	TF 10–0	January 10, 2024	2024 Grand Prix Zagreb Open	Zagreb, Croatia
2023 Senior Nationals 5th at 86 kg
Win		(United States) David McFadden	INJ	December 15, 2023	2023 Senior Nationals	(United States) Fort Worth, Texas
Loss	49–25	(United States) Connor Mirasola	4–5	December 15, 2023	2023 Senior Nationals	(United States) Fort Worth, Texas
Win	49–24	(United States) Marcus Coleman	7–2	December 15, 2023	2023 Senior Nationals	(United States) Fort Worth, Texas
Win	48–24	(United States) Owen Webster	8–1	December 15, 2023	2023 Senior Nationals	(United States) Fort Worth, Texas
Loss	47–24	(United States) Alex Dieringer	2–5	December 15, 2023	2023 Senior Nationals	(United States) Fort Worth, Texas
Win	47–23	(United States) Michael O'Malley	7–0	December 15, 2023	2023 Senior Nationals	(United States) Fort Worth, Texas
2023 Bill Farrell Memorial International DNP at 86 kg
Loss	46–23	(Georgia (country)) Avtandil Kentchadze	4–4	November 17, 2023	2023 Bill Farrell Memorial International	(United States) New York City, New York
Win	46–22	(United States) Marcus Coleman	TF 12–1	November 17, 2023	2023 Bill Farrell Memorial International	(United States) New York City, New York
Win	45–22	(Canada) Andrew Johnson	TF 10–0	November 17, 2023	2023 Bill Farrell Memorial International	(United States) New York City, New York
Loss	44–22	(United States) Connor Mirasola	Fall	November 17, 2023	2023 Bill Farrell Memorial International	(United States) New York City, New York
Win	44–21	(United States) Aarif Asif	TF 10–0	November 17, 2023	2023 Bill Farrell Memorial International	(United States) New York City, New York
Win	43–21	(Pakistan) Muhammad Inam	TF 10–0	November 17, 2023	2023 Bill Farrell Memorial International	(United States) New York City, New York
2023 Ibrahim Moustafa Tournament 7th at 79 kg
Loss	42–21	(Kazakhstan) Bolat Sakayev	6–8	February 23, 2023	2023 Ibrahim Moustafa Tournament	Alexandria, Egypt
Win	42–20	(Morocco) Sofiane Padiou Belmir	TF 11–0	February 23, 2023	2023 Ibrahim Moustafa Tournament	Alexandria, Egypt
Win	41–20	(Georgia (country)) Evsem Shvelidze	TF 14–4	February 23, 2023	2023 Ibrahim Moustafa Tournament	Alexandria, Egypt
2023 Grand Prix de France Henri Deglane (gold) at 79 kg
Win	40–20	(United States) Alex Marinelli	6–5	January 20, 2023	2023 Grand Prix de France Henri Deglane	Nice, France
Win	39–20	(United States) Taylor Lujan	Fall	January 20, 2023	2023 Grand Prix de France Henri Deglane	Nice, France
Win	38–20	(Germany) Ansgar Reinke	TF 14–3	January 20, 2023	2023 Grand Prix de France Henri Deglane	Nice, France
Win	37–20	(Ukraine) Vasyl Mykhailov	8–2	December 18, 2022	Beat the Streets	(United States) Los Angeles, California
2022 Bill Farrell Memorial International DNP at 79 kg
Loss	36–20	(United States) Taylor Lujan	4–10	November 18, 2022	2022 Bill Farrell Memorial International	(United States) New York City, New York
Loss	36–19	(Georgia (country)) Avtandil Kentchadze	2–8	November 18, 2022	2022 Bill Farrell Memorial International	(United States) New York City, New York
Win	36–18	(United States) Jaison White	TF 10–0	November 18, 2022	2022 Bill Farrell Memorial International	(United States) New York City, New York
2022 USMC US Open 7th at 79 kg
Win		(United States) Isaiah Martinez	FF	April 27, 2022	2022 USMC US Open	(United States) Las Vegas, Nevada
Loss	35–18	(United States) Alex Dieringer	Fall	April 27, 2022	2022 USMC US Open	(United States) Las Vegas, Nevada
Win	35–17	(United States) Isaiah White	16–12	April 27, 2022	2022 USMC US Open	(United States) Las Vegas, Nevada
Loss	34–17	(United States) Taylor Lujan	Fall	April 27, 2022	2022 USMC US Open	(United States) Las Vegas, Nevada
Win	34–16	(United States) Jaison White	TF 11–0	April 27, 2022	2022 USMC US Open	(United States) Las Vegas, Nevada
Win	33–16	(United States) Nick Incontrera	8–2	April 27, 2022	2022 USMC US Open	(United States) Las Vegas, Nevada
2021 World Team Trials DNP at 79 kg
Loss	32–16	(United States) Carter Starocci	4–8	September 11, 2021	2021 World Team Trials	(United States) Lincoln, Nebraska
Win	32–15	(United States) Devin Skatzka	TF 14–4	September 11, 2021	2021 World Team Trials	(United States) Lincoln, Nebraska
Loss	31–15	(United States) Jason Nolf	TF 0–10	September 11, 2021	2021 World Team Trials	(United States) Lincoln, Nebraska
Win	31–14	(United States) Michael O'Malley	10–2	September 11, 2021	2021 World Team Trials	(United States) Lincoln, Nebraska
2020 U.S. Olympic Team Trials (bronze) at 74 kg
Loss	30–14	(United States) Jason Nolf	TF 0–10	April 2, 2021	2020 U.S. Olympic Team Trials	(United States) Fort Worth, Texas
Win	30–13	(United States) Logan Massa	13–9	April 2, 2021	2020 U.S. Olympic Team Trials	(United States) Fort Worth, Texas
Win	29–13	(United States) Thomas Gantt	8–2	April 2, 2021	2020 U.S. Olympic Team Trials	(United States) Fort Worth, Texas
Loss	28–13	(United States) Kyle Dake	TF 0–10	April 2, 2021	2020 U.S. Olympic Team Trials	(United States) Fort Worth, Texas
Win	28–12	(United States) Chance Marsteller	Fall	April 2, 2021	2020 U.S. Olympic Team Trials	(United States) Fort Worth, Texas
Win	27–12	(United States) Thomas Gantt	9–8	April 2, 2021	2020 U.S. Olympic Team Trials	(United States) Fort Worth, Texas
Win	26–12	(United States) Tyler Berger	Fall	February 24, 2021	2021 Wisconsin RTC Underground 4– 74 kg	(United States) Madison, Wisconsin
Win	25–12	(United States) Chad Walsh	8–6	February 10, 2021	2021 America's Cup- 74 kg	(United States) Concord, North Carolina
Win	24–12	(United States) Julian Ramirez	TF 10–0	February 10, 2021	2021 America's Cup- 74 kg	(United States) Concord, North Carolina
Win	23–12	(United States) Josh Shields	8–2	February 10, 2021	2021 America's Cup- 74 kg	(United States) Concord, North Carolina
Loss	22–12	(United States) Chance Marsteller	TF 0–10	January 26, 2021	2021 PWC 2– 79 kg	(United States) Pittsburgh, Pennsylvania
Loss	22–11	(United States) David McFadden	4–7	January 20, 2021	2021 Wisconsin RTC Underground 3– 74 kg	(United States) Madison, Wisconsin
Win	22–10	(United States) Kennedy Monday	Fall	December 16, 2020	2020 Wisconsin RTC Underground 2 –79 kg	(United States) Madison, Wisconsin
Win	21–10	(United States) Mekhi Lewis	11–5	December 4, 2020	2020 FloWrestling RTC Cup -74 kg	(United States) Austin, Texas
Loss	20–10	(United States) Thomas Gantt	2–7	December 4, 2020	2020 FloWrestling RTC Cup -74 kg	(United States) Austin, Texas
Loss	20–9	(United States) Logan Massa	2–5	December 4, 2020	2020 FloWrestling RTC Cup -74 kg	(United States) Austin, Texas
2020 Senior Nationals 4th at 74 kg
Loss	20–8	(United States) Hayden Hidlay	8–11	October 9, 2020	2020 Senior Nationals	(United States) Coralville, Iowa
Win	20–7	(United States) Ryan Deakin	TF 10–0	October 9, 2020	2020 Senior Nationals	(United States) Coralville, Iowa
Loss	19–7	(United States) Anthony Valencia	8–10	October 9, 2020	2020 Senior Nationals	(United States) Coralville, Iowa
Win	19–6	(United States) Joey Lavallee	TF 10–0	October 9, 2020	2020 Senior Nationals	(United States) Coralville, Iowa
Win	18–6	(United States) Cam Amine	8–5	October 9, 2020	2020 Senior Nationals	(United States) Coralville, Iowa
Win	17–6	(United States) Dennis Owcarz	TF 10–0	October 9, 2020	2020 Senior Nationals	(United States) Coralville, Iowa
Win	16–6	(United States) Jake Keating	Fall	October 9, 2020	2020 Senior Nationals	(United States) Coralville, Iowa
2019 Senior Nationals 4th at 74 kg
Loss		(United States) Thomas Gantt	FF	December 20, 2019	2019 Senior Nationals	(United States) Fort Worth, Texas
Win	15–6	(United States) Nazar Kulchytskyy	4–2	December 20, 2019	2019 Senior Nationals	(United States) Fort Worth, Texas
Win	14–6	(United States) Joey Lavallee	TF 16–5	December 20, 2019	2019 Senior Nationals	(United States) Fort Worth, Texas
Win	13–6	(United States) Jake Sueflohn	TF 10–0	December 20, 2019	2019 Senior Nationals	(United States) Fort Worth, Texas
Loss	12–6	(United States) Thomas Gantt	4–10	December 20, 2019	2019 Senior Nationals	(United States) Fort Worth, Texas
Win	12–5	(United States) Nick Becker	14–11	December 20, 2019	2019 Senior Nationals	(United States) Fort Worth, Texas
Win	11–5	(United States) Deondre Wilson	TF 12–2	December 20, 2019	2019 Senior Nationals	(United States) Fort Worth, Texas
2019 Marine Corps US Open at 74 kg
Loss	10–5	(United States) Jared Frayer	Fall	April 23, 2019	2019 Marine Corps US Open	(United States) Las Vegas, Nevada
Loss	10–4	(United States) Anthony Valencia	8–9	April 23, 2019	2019 Marine Corps US Open	(United States) Las Vegas, Nevada
Win	10–3	(United States) Austin Kraisser	8–0	April 23, 2019	2019 Marine Corps US Open	(United States) Las Vegas, Nevada
Win	9–3	(United States) Micah Arakawa	TF 10–0	April 23, 2019	2019 Marine Corps US Open	(United States) Las Vegas, Nevada
2018 World Team Trials Challenge Tournament (bronze) at 74 kg
Win	8–3	(United States) Quinton Godley	5–1	May 17, 2018	2018 World Team Trials Challenge Tournament	(United States) Rochester, Minnesota
Win	7–3	(United States) Taleb Rahmani	TF 14–4	May 17, 2018	2018 World Team Trials Challenge Tournament	(United States) Rochester, Minnesota
Loss	6–3	(United States) Nazar Kulchytskyy	Fall	May 17, 2018	2018 World Team Trials Challenge Tournament	(United States) Rochester, Minnesota
Win	6–2	(United States) Quinton Godley	Fall	May 17, 2018	2018 World Team Trials Challenge Tournament	(United States) Rochester, Minnesota
2018 Marine Corps US Open 5th at 74 kg
Win	5–2	(United States) Carson Brolsma	TF 10–0	April 24, 2018	2018 Marine Corps US Open	(United States) Las Vegas, Nevada
Loss	4–2	(United States) Jake Sueflohn	TF 2–12	April 24, 2018	2018 Marine Corps US Open	(United States) Las Vegas, Nevada
Win	4–1	(United States) Nicholas Bonomo	TF 10–0	April 24, 2018	2018 Marine Corps US Open	(United States) Las Vegas, Nevada
Win	3–1	(United States) Alexander Smythe	6–4	April 24, 2018	2018 Marine Corps US Open	(United States) Las Vegas, Nevada
Win	2–1	(United States) Jonathan Carrera	TF 10–0	April 24, 2018	2018 Marine Corps US Open	(United States) Las Vegas, Nevada
Win	1–1	(United States) Trevor DeVestern	TF 12–2	April 24, 2018	2018 Marine Corps US Open	(United States) Las Vegas, Nevada
Loss	0–1	(United States) Jake Sueflohn	4–6	April 24, 2018	2018 Marine Corps US Open	(United States) Las Vegas, Nevada

== Real American Freestyle ==
Wick debuted for Real American Freestyle (RAF) at RAF 01 on August 30, 2025, defeating Jason Nolf to become the inaugural RAF Middleweight Champion.

He lost the RAF Middleweight Championship to Dean Hamiti by pinfall at RAF 04 on December 20, 2025.

Wick defeated Mahamedkhabib Kadzimahamedau by technical fall at RAF 06 on February 28, 2026.

== Coaching career ==
On October 25, 2022, Wick was hired as assistant coach for the Cal Poly Mustangs.

Achievements
New championship	1st RAF Middleweight Champion; August 30, 2025 – December 20, 2025	Succeeded by Dean Hamiti
