= Georgio Poullas =

American wrestler (born 1998)

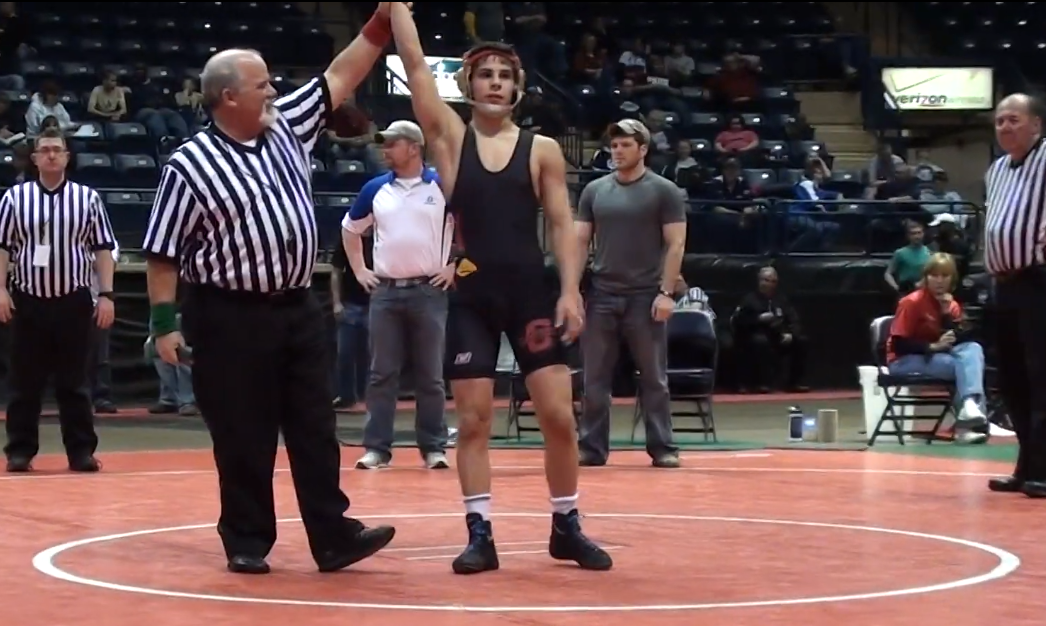
- Poullas in 2013

Personal information
- Born: April 21, 1998 (age 28) Canfield, Ohio, U.S.
- Height: 5 ft 7 in (170 cm)
- Weight: 175 lb (79 kg)
- Website: georgiopoullas.com

Sport
- Country: United States
- Sport: Wrestling
- Events: Freestyle and Folkstyle
- College team: Cleveland State (2017–2019); Rider (2019–2020)

Georgio Poullas (Greek: Γεώργιος Πούλλας, born April 21, 1998) is an American freestyle wrestler who competes at 79 kilograms.

In high school wrestling, he was a former Ohio High School Athletic Association champion and Walsh Jesuit Ironman winner. At the NCAA Division I level, Poullas wrestled for both the Cleveland State Vikings and Rider Broncs during his collegiate wrestling career.

He is known as a social media influencer, making videos where he offers $1,000 to people who can successfully perform a takedown on him.

Poullas is currently signed to the Middleweight division of Real American Freestyle (RAF). Following his controversial bout with Arman Tsarukyan at RAF 06, Poullas reportedly received the highest-salary ever paid to a competitive wrestler for their headlining rematch at RAF 07.

== Early life ==
Georgio Poullas was born in Canfield, Ohio, the son of George and Tammy Poullas. He is of Greek descent.

== High school career ==
Poullas wrestled for Canfield High School, winning the 2016 Ohio High School Athletic Association championship.

He won the 2016 Walsh Jesuit Ironman tournament.

Poullas finished his senior season at Canfield with a 43–1 record. His sole loss came in the final match of the 2017 Ohio High School Athletic Association championships, where he lost in overtime to Ryan Thomas of Graham High School.

In his four years at Canfield, Poullas amassed an overall record of 176–15.

== College career ==
He committed to wrestling collegiality for Cleveland State University on December 2, 2016. Cleveland State was chosen after Ohio State University invited Poullas for a visit, but never made a formal offer.

Poullas later transferred to Rider University in 2019.

Following college, Poullas returned home to coach his younger brother Niko, who wrestled at Canfield High School.

== Takedown challenge ==
Poullas became a social media influencer, uploading videos of people attempting to perform a takedown on him to win $1,000.

He maintains that no one has ever taken him down, after online video surfaced to dispute his claim.

Since 2024, Poullas has resided in Los Angeles as a client of the Creators Inc. talent agency, with its owner Andrew Bachman serving as his personal agent.

== Real American Freestyle ==
Poullas debuted for Real American Freestyle (RAF) at RAF 05 on January 10, 2026. He defeated fellow influencer Keelon Jimison by technical fall.

At RAF 06 on February 28, 2026, Poullas lost to Arman Tsarukyan by 5–3 decision. Tsarukyan punched Poullas following the match, sparking a brawl between both competitors and their cornermen.

A rematch between Poullas and Tsarukyan headlined RAF 07 on March 28, 2026. Tsarukyan defeated Poullas by 9–3 decision. For taking part, Poullas reportedly received the highest salary ever paid for a single competitive wrestling bout.

== Freestyle record ==
Senior Freestyle Matches
Res.	Record	Opponent	Score	Date	Event	Location
Loss	1–2	(Armenia) Arman Tsarukyan	3–9	March 28, 2026	RAF 07	(United States) Tampa, Florida
Loss	1–1	(Armenia) Arman Tsarukyan	3–5	February 28, 2026	RAF 06	(United States) Tempe, Arizona
Win	1–0	(United States) Keelon Jimison	TF 14–1	January 10, 2026	RAF 05	(United States) Sunrise, Florida

== NCAA record ==
NCAA Matches
Res.	Record	Opponent	Score	Date	Event
Loss	33–29	Tyler Barnes	Fall	January 1, 2020	2020 Southern Scuffle at 165 lbs
Loss	33–28	Zane Mulder	3–7	January 1, 2020	2020 Southern Scuffle at 165 lbs
Loss	33–27	Tracy Hubbard	2–3	December 8, 2019	Rider vs. Central Michigan dual meet at 165 lbs
Loss	33–26	Nate Newberry	10–15	December 6, 2019	Rider vs. Bloomsburg dual meet at 165 lbs
Loss	33–25	Ebed Jarrell	3–6	November 24, 2019	2019 Keystone Classic at 165 lbs
Loss	33–24	Brandon Levesque	1–2	November 24, 2019	2019 Keystone Classic at 165 lbs
Win	33–23	Michael Kistler	10–4	November 24, 2019	2019 Keystone Classic at 165 lbs
Win	32–23	John Crawford	Fall	November 24, 2019	2019 Keystone Classic at 165 lbs
Win	31–23	Anthony Patsy	MD 14–4	November 24, 2019	2019 Keystone Classic at 165 lbs
Loss	30–23	Bailee O'Reilly	MD 9–17	November 15, 2019	Rider vs. Minnesota dual meet at 165 lbs
Win	30–22	Tim Higginson	Forfeit	November 10, 2019	2019 East Stroudsburg Open at 165 lbs
Win	29–22	Terrell White	Fall	November 10, 2019	2019 East Stroudsburg Open at 165 lbs
Win	28–22	Henry Hague	Fall	November 10, 2019	2019 East Stroudsburg Open at 165 lbs
Win	27–22	Wayne Stinson, Jr.	Forfeit	November 10, 2019	2019 East Stroudsburg Open at 165 lbs
Win	26–22	Sean Kilrain	TF 16–0	November 10, 2019	2019 East Stroudsburg Open at 165 lbs
Loss	25–22	Nick Incontrera	Fall	November 3, 2019	2019 Princeton Open at 165 lbs
Loss	25–21	Dale Tiongson	6–11	November 3, 2019	2019 Princeton Open at 165 lbs
Win	25–20	Trevor Chippas	Fall	February 10, 2019	2019 John Carroll University Open at 165 lbs
Loss	24–20	Eric Fasnacht	4–6	February 10, 2019	2019 John Carroll University Open at 165 lbs
Win	24–19	Chase Moore	Fall	February 10, 2019	2019 John Carroll University Open at 165 lbs
Win	23–19	Albert Taylor	Fall	February 10, 2019	2019 John Carroll University Open at 165 lbs
Loss	22–19	Ryan Ford	Forfeit	December 29, 2018	2018 Lock Haven Classic at 165 lbs
Loss	22–18	Cade Hepner	9–10	December 29, 2018	2018 Lock Haven Classic at 165 lbs
Win	22–17	Mitchell Hartman	4–0	December 29, 2018	2018 Lock Haven Classic at 165 lbs
Win	21–17	Larry Brown	Fall	December 29, 2018	2018 Lock Haven Classic at 165 lbs
Loss	20–17	Zach Finesilver	Fall	December 15, 2018	2018 Cleveland State Open at 165 lbs
Win	20–16	Sammy Cokeley	Fall	December 15, 2018	2018 Cleveland State Open at 165 lbs
Win	19–16	Brady Chrisman	10–9	December 15, 2018	2018 Cleveland State Open at 165 lbs
Win	18–16	Noah Grover	Fall	December 15, 2018	2018 Cleveland State Open at 165 lbs
Win	17–16	Jack Rogan	SV-1 10–3	December 15, 2018	2018 Cleveland State Open at 165 lbs
Loss	16–16	Max Wohlabaugh	4–6	March 3, 2018	2018 EWL Championships at 165 lbs
Win	16–15	Nate Newberry	13–6	March 3, 2018	2018 EWL Championships at 165 lbs
Loss	15–15	Chance Marsteller	3–7	March 3, 2018	2018 EWL Championships at 165 lbs
Win	15–14	Max Wohlabaugh	5–2	March 3, 2018	2018 EWL Championships at 165 lbs
Win	14–14	Fritz Hoehn	14–8	February 17, 2018	Cleveland State vs. Edinboro dual meet at 165 lbs
Loss	13–14	Chance Marsteller	Fall	February 3, 2018	Cleveland State vs. Lock Haven dual meet at 165 lbs
Loss	13–13	Nate Newberry	Fall	February 2, 2018	Cleveland State vs. Bloomsburg dual meet at 165 lbs
Win	13–12	Max Wohlabaugh	8–3	January 28, 2018	Cleveland State vs. Clarion dual meet at 165 lbs
Win	12–12	Ryan Yorkdale	Fall	January 27, 2018	Cleveland State vs. George Mason dual meet 165 lbs
Loss	11–12	Chad Walsh	Fall	January 19, 2018	Cleveland State vs. Rider dual meet at 165 lbs
Win	11–11	Ryan Ferro	7–6	January 14, 2018	2018 Purple Raider Open at 165 lbs
Loss	10–11	Cody Burcher	Fall	January 14, 2018	2018 Purple Raider Open at 165 lbs
Win	10–10	Bret Fedewa	8–2	January 14, 2018	2018 Purple Raider Open at 165 lbs
Loss	9–10	Quentin Perez	TF 2–17	January 1, 2018	2018 Southern Scuffle at 165 lbs
Loss	9–9	Alexandre Lopouchanski	Fall	January 1, 2018	2018 Southern Scuffle at 165 lbs
Loss	9–8	Austin Hiles	Fall	December 16, 2017	2017 Cleveland State Open at 165 lbs
Loss	9–7	Brett Stein	4–9	December 16, 2017	2017 Cleveland State Open at 165 lbs
Win	9–6	Nathan Russell	4–2	December 16, 2017	2017 Cleveland State Open at 165 lbs
Win	8–6	Vittorio Santillo	Fall	December 9, 2017	Cleveland State vs. John Carroll dual meet at 165 lbs
Loss	7–6	Zac Carson	5–7	December 8, 2017	Cleveland State vs. Eastern Michigan dual meet at 165 lbs
Win	7–5	Caden McWhirter	10–6	December 2, 2017	Cleveland State vs. Northern Illinois dual meet at 157 lbs
Loss	6–5	Casey Sparkman	TF 3–18	November 21, 2017	Cleveland State vs. Kent State dual meet at 157 lbs
Loss	6–4	Micah Jordan	Fall	November 21, 2017	Cleveland State vs. Ohio State dual meet at 157 lbs
Win	6–3	Brady Barnett	Forfeit	November 11, 2017	2017 Eastern Michigan Open at 157 lbs
Loss	5–3	Mason Kauffman	2–5	November 11, 2017	2017 Eastern Michigan Open at 157 lbs
Win	5–2	Elijah Davis	7–2	November 11, 2017	2017 Eastern Michigan Open at 157 lbs
Loss	4–2	Zachary Moore	Forfeit	November 5, 2017	2017 Clarion Open at 157 lbs
Win	4–1	Cameron Coy	Forfeit	November 5, 2017	2017 Clarion Open at 157 lbs
Win	3–1	Brady Barnett	11–4	November 5, 2017	2017 Clarion Open at 157 lbs
Loss	2–1	Joe Lee	MD 1–11	November 5, 2017	2017 Clarion Open at 157 lbs
Win	2–0	Jacob Smith	Fall	November 5, 2017	2017 Clarion Open at 157 lbs
Win	1–0	Avery Shay	6–4	November 5, 2017	2017 Clarion Open at 157 lbs
