= RAF 14 =

Upcoming 2026 wrestling event

RAF 14: Tsarukyan vs. Danis
- The poster for RAF 14: Tsarukyan vs. Danis
- Promotion: Real American Freestyle
- Date: October 23, 2026
- Venue: Fontainebleau Las Vegas
- City: Las Vegas, Nevada

Event chronology
RAF 13: Covington vs Muhammad	RAF 14: Tsarukyan vs. Danis	RAF Abu Dhabi: Chimaev vs. Weidman

RAF 14: Tsarukyan vs. Danis was a freestyle wrestling event produced by the Real American Freestyle (RAF) promotion that took place on October 23, 2026, at the Fontainebleau Las Vegas in Las Vegas, Nevada.

== Background ==
This marked the promotion's debut in Las Vegas.

A middleweight bout for the inaugural RAF Middleweight Crossover Championship between Arman Tsarukyan and Dillon Danis headlined the event.

A catchweight bout between former UFC Middleweight Champion Khamzat Chimaev and former UFC Welterweight Champion (also promotional newcomer) Robbie Lawler served as the co-main event.

In addition, two championship bouts took place:

- An RAF Women's Strawweight Championship bout between current champion Lucía Yépez and former champion (also 2024 Olympic gold medalist) Sarah Hildebrandt.
- An RAF Lightweight Championship bout for the vacant title between former RAF Featherweight Champion Jordan Oliver and Ridge Lovett. For undisclosed reasons, Yianni Diakomihalis was stripped off his title in April.

A cruiserweight bout between Michael Page and former Bellator Middleweight Champion Alexander Shlemenko was scheduled for the event. However, Page withdrew for undisclosed reasons and was replaced by former LFA Middleweight Champion Brendan Allen.

Former RAF Bantamweight Champion Nathan Tomasello was scheduled to face 2025 Pan American freestyle champion Roman Bravo-Young. However, the bout was pulled for undisclosed reasons. They were scheduled to compete for the bantamweight championship in October 2025 at RAF 02 but Bravo-Young had to withdraw due to an injury.

Dylan Ragusin was originally scheduled to face Nick Suriano. However, Suriano withdrew and was replaced by Juan Archuleta.

Yonger Bastida was originally scheduled to face Greg Kerkvliet. However, Kerkvliet withdrew and was replaced by Zachery Elam.

== Fight card ==
Main card
Weight class				Method	Round	Time	Notes
Middleweight	(Armenia) Arman Tsarukyan	def.	(United States) Dillon Danis	Technical fall (10-0)	1	1:19	(Note: For the inaugural RAF Middleweight Crossover Championship.)
Catchweight	(United Arab Emirates) Khamzat Chimaev	def.	(United States) Robbie Lawler	Technical fall (11-0)	1	1:40
Women's Strawweight	(Ecuador) Lucía Yépez (c)	def.	(United States) Sarah Hildebrandt	Decision (8-7)	3	2:00	(Note: For the RAF Women's Strawweight Championship.)
Featherweight	(Puerto Rico) Sebastian Rivera	def.	(United States) Vito Arujau	Decision (criteria) (11-11)	3	2:00	(Note: RAF Featherweight title eliminator.)
Middleweight	(United States) Michael Caliendo	def.	(United States) Jordan Burroughs	Decision (7-5)	3	2:00
Lightweight	(United States) Ridge Lovett	def.	(United States) Jordan Oliver	Technical fall (13-2)	3	1:59	(Note: For the vacant RAF Lightweight Championship.)
Heavyweight	(Cuba) Yonger Bastida	def.	(United States) Zachery Elam	Decision (9-1)	3	2:00
Cruiserweight	(Russia) Akhmed Gadzhimagomedov	def.	(United States) Mekhi Lewis	Decision (5-4)	3	2:00
Women's Middleweight	(United States) Bella Mir	def.	(United States) Hope Chase	Technical fall (10-0)	2	0:31
Catchweight	(United States) Pat Downey	def.	(Russia) Magomed Magomedkerimov	Pinfall	2	1:19
Catchweight	(United States) Brendan Allen	def.	(Russia) Alexander Shlemenko	Technical fall (10-0)	1	1:54
Featherweight	(United States) Dylan Ragusin	def.	(United States) Juan Archuleta	Technical fall (10-0)	1	1:41

== Bonus awards ==
The following athletes received bonuses.

- Match of the Night: Sebastian Rivera vs. Vito Arujau
- Performance of the Night: Lucía Yépez and Michael Caliendo
- Flight of the Night: Vito Arujau

== See also ==
- List of RAF events
