= Russian National Freestyle 2017 – Men's freestyle 70 kg =

The men's freestyle 70 kg is a competition featured at the 2017 Russian National Freestyle Wrestling Championships, and was held in Nazran, Ingushetia, Russia on June 12.

== Medalists ==
Gold	(Dagestan) Magomedkhabib Kadimagomedov
Silver	(Ivanovo Oblast) Magomed Dibirgadzhiev
Bronze	(Khanty-Mansi Autonomous Okrug) David Baev
Bronze	(Chechnya) Rasul Dzhukayev

== Results ==
Legend

- F — Won by fall
- WO — Won by walkover

=== Finals ===
Semifinals		Final
(Khanty-Mansi Autonomous Okrug) David Baev	13
(Ivanovo Oblast) Magomed Dibirgadzhiev	17	(Ivanovo Oblast) Magomed Dibirgadzhiev	1
(Chechnya) Rasul Dzhukayev	1	(Dagestan) Magomedkhabib Kadimagomedov	2
(Dagestan) Magomedkhabib Kadimagomedov	3

=== Top half ===
==== Section 1 ====
Round of 64

Round of 32
(Moscow) Magomed Magomedov	0
(Dagestan) Magomed Kurbanaliev	4
(Tatarstan) Ildus Giniyatullin	5
(Dagestan) Abush Abushev	0
(North Ossetia–Alania) Zaur Tokaev	8
(Leningrad Oblast) Daniil Egorov	3
(Khanty-Mansi Autonomous Okrug) David Baev	7
(Voronezh Oblast) Dmitiy Merenkov	2

Round of 16
(Dagestan) Magomed Kurbanaliev	4
(Tatarstan) Ildus Giniyatullin	0
(North Ossetia–Alania) Zaur Tokaev	2
(Khanty-Mansi Autonomous Okrug) David Baev	4

Quarterfinals
(Dagestan) Magomed Kurbanaliev	10
(Khanty-Mansi Autonomous Okrug) David Baev	10

==== Section 2 ====
Round of 64

Round of 32
(Samara Oblast) Grigor Sropyan	4
(Ivanovo Oblast) Magomed Dibirgadzhiev	5
(Khanty-Mansi Autonomous Okrug) Magomed Murtazaliev	2
(Sverdlovsk Oblast) Malik Khozhikov	6^{F}
(Stavropol Krai) Vladislav Dyshekov	2
(Rostov Oblast) Magomedkerim Malachaev	4
(Bryansk Oblast) Aisen Kopyrin	0
(Karachay-Cherkessia) Alibek Akbaev	6

Round of 16
(Ivanovo Oblast) Magomed Dibirgadzhiev	9
(Sverdlovsk Oblast) Malik Khozhikov	1
(Rostov Oblast) Magomedkerim Malachaev	0
(Karachay-Cherkessia) Alibek Akbaev	2

Quarterfinals
(Ivanovo Oblast) Magomed Dibirgadzhiev	4
(Karachay-Cherkessia) Alibek Akbaev	3

=== Bottom half ===
==== Section 3 ====
Round of 64

Round of 32
(Dagestan) Magomed Kuramagomedov	2
(Krasnoyarsk Krai) Israil Kasumov	12
(Kemerovo Oblast) Babudrzhon Abdusamatov	0
(Krasnoyarsk Krai) Nadirbek Khizriev	10
(Chechnya) Rasul Dzhukayev	4
(Yakutia) German Ustinov	2
(Dagestan) Abdutalim Gamzaev	4
(Saint Petersburg) Ruslan Bogatyrev	2

Round of 16
(Krasnoyarsk Krai) Israil Kasumov	8
(Krasnoyarsk Krai) Nadirbek Khizriev	8
(Chechnya) Rasul Dzhukayev	6
(Dagestan) Abdutalim Gamzaev	4

Quarterfinals
(Krasnoyarsk Krai) Israil Kasumov	4
(Chechnya) Rasul Dzhukayev	4

==== Section 4 ====
Round of 64
(North Ossetia–Alania) Zaurbek Sidakov	10
(Buryatia) Yevgeny Zherbaev	8
(Yakutia) Viktor Stepanov	0
(Dagestan) Shamil Magomedov	10
(Kemerovo Oblast) Artur Khutsystov	2
(Moscow) Soslan Gigloev	6

Round of 32
(Moscow Oblast) Vadim Dzyboev	2
(Dagestan) Magomedkhabib Kadimagomedov	8
(Bryansk Oblast) Gregory Smolyakov	2
(Dagestan) Muslim Shamsudinov	8
(Yakutia) Timur Nikolaev	0
(North Ossetia–Alania) Zaurbek Sidakov	5
(Dagestan) Shamil Magomedov	11
(Moscow) Soslan Gigloev	0

Round of 16
(Dagestan) Magomedkhabib Kadimagomedov	10
(Dagestan) Muslim Shamsudinov	0
(North Ossetia–Alania) Zaurbek Sidakov	4^{F}
(Dagestan) Shamil Magomedov	0

Quarterfinals
(Dagestan) Magomedkhabib Kadimagomedov	4
(North Ossetia–Alania) Zaurbek Sidakov	2

=== Repechage ===
Repechage round 1
(Samara Oblast) Grigor Sropyan	3
(Sverdlovsk Oblast) Malik Khozhikov	3
(Moscow Oblast) Vadim Dzyboev	bey
(Dagestan) Muslim Shamsudinov

Repechage round 2
(Sverdlovsk Oblast) Malik Khozhikov	0
(Karachay-Cherkessia) Alibek Akbaev	10
(Dagestan) Muslim Shamsudinov	4
(North Ossetia–Alania) Zaurbek Sidakov	15

Bronze medals
(Karachay-Cherkessia) Alibek Akbaev	4
(Khanty-Mansi Autonomous Okrug) David Baev	6
(North Ossetia–Alania) Zaurbek Sidakov	2
(Chechnya) Rasul Dzhukayev	3
