= RAF Georgia =

2026 wrestling event

RAF Georgia: Dvalishvili vs. Cejudo
- The poster for RAF Georgia: Dvalishvili vs. Cejudo
- Promotion: Real American Freestyle
- Date: July 11, 2026
- Venue: Tbilisi Arena
- City: Tbilisi, Georgia
- Attendance: 8,000+

Event chronology
RAF 10: Chimaev vs. Danis	RAF Georgia: Dvalishvili vs. Cejudo	RAF 11: Tsarukyan vs. Covington

RAF Georgia: Dvalishvili vs. Cejudo was a freestyle wrestling event produced by the Real American Freestyle (RAF) promotion that took place on July 11, 2026, at the Tbilisi Arena in Tbilisi, Georgia.

== Background ==
The event marked RAF's first visit to Georgia and featured several of the nation's top freestyle wrestlers. In the main event, former UFC Bantawmeight Champion Merab Dvalishvili faced former UFC Flyweight and Bantamweight Champion (also 2008 Olympic gold medalist in freestyle wrestling) Henry Cejudo. They were originally scheduled to compete at RAF 08 in April 2026 but Cejudo withdrew hours before the event. They competed at UFC 298 in mixed martial arts in February 2024 where Dvalishvili won via unanimous decision.

Three championship bouts took place at the event:

- An RAF Light Heavyweight Championship bout between champion Kyle Snyder (also 2016 Summer Olympics men's freestyle gold medalist) and two-time Olympic gold medalist (2016 and 2020) Abdulrashid Sadulaev. They competed five previous times with Snyder winning in August 2017 and September 2023, while Sadulaev won in October 2017, August 2021 and October 2021.
- An RAF Cruiserweight Championship bout between champion Kyle Dake (also four-time NCAA Division I National Champion) and Vladimer Gamkrelidze.
- An RAF Women's Bantamweight Championship bout between champion Helen Maroulis (also 2016 Summer Olympics freestyle wrestling gold medalist) and Anhelina Lysak.

== Results ==
Main card
Weight class				Method	Round	Time	Notes
Lightweight	(Georgia (country)) Merab Dvalishvili	def.	(United States) Henry Cejudo	Decision (11–8)	3	2:00
Light Heavyweight	(United States) Kyle Snyder (c)	def.	(Russia) Abdulrashid Sadulaev	Pinfall	3	0:25	(Note: For the RAF Light Heavyweight Championship.)
Cruiserweight	(United States) Kyle Dake (c)	def.	(Georgia (country)) Vladimer Gamkrelidze	Decision (2–0)	3	2:00	(Note: For the RAF Cruiserweight Championship.)
Featherweight	(Georgia (country)) Vladimer Khinchegashvili	def.	(United States) Conor Beebe	Technical fall (11–0)	2	2:00
Lightweight	(Kyrgyzstan) Ernazar Akmataliev	def.	(United States) Zain Retherford	Decision (criteria) (3–3)	3	2:00
Heavyweight	(Georgia (country)) Givi Matcharashvili	def.	(United States) Zach Elam	Decision (7–3)	3	2:00
Heavyweight	(Georgia (country)) Geno Petriashvili	def.	(United States) Jake Varner	Technical fall (10–0)	2	1:02
Women's Bantamweight	(United States) Helen Maroulis (c)	def.	(Ukraine) Anhelina Lysak	Pinfall	3	2:00	(Note: For the RAF Women's Bantamweight Championship.)
Cruiserweight	(Uzbekistan) Razambek Zhamalov	def.	(United States) Jarrett Jacques	Decision (3–2)	3	2:00
Women's Bantamweight	(Moldova) Anastasia Nichita	def.	(India) Vinesh Phogat	Decision (7–6)	3	2:00
Featherweight	(United States) Brock Hardy	def.	(Bahrain) Alibeg Alibegov	Technical fall (13–2)	2	1:22
Middleweight	(Armenia) Arman Tsarukyan	def.	(Kazakhstan) Kuat Khamitov	Technical fall (11–0)	3	1:06

== Bonus awards ==
The following athletes received bonuses.

- Match of the Night: Merab Dvalishvili vs. Henry Cejudo
- Performance of the Night: Kyle Snyder

== See also ==
- List of RAF events
