= List of Real American Freestyle champions =

Real American Freestyle (RAF) champions have been crowned in various weight classes, and this is a history of their reigns.

== Current champions ==
RAF champions as of November 14, 2026.

=== Men ===
Division	Weight	Champion	Since	Days	Defenses
Heavyweight	285 lb (129 kg)	(United States) Wyatt Hendrickson	August 30, 2025	443	2
Light Heavyweight	215 lb (98 kg)	(United States) Kyle Snyder	March 28, 2026	233	5
Light Heavyweight Crossover	215 lb (98 kg)	(United Arab Emirates) Khamzat Chimaev	November 14, 2026	2	0
Cruiserweight	190 lb (86 kg)	(United States) Kyle Dake	August 30, 2025	443	6
Cruiserweight Crossover	190 lb (86 kg)	(United States) Colby Covington	July 18, 2026	121	1
Middleweight	175 lb (79 kg)	(United States) Jason Nolf	August 22, 2026	86	1
Middleweight Crossover	175 lb (79 kg)	(Armenia) Arman Tsarukyan	October 23, 2026	24	0
Welterweight	165 lb (75 kg)	vacant	—	—	—
Lightweight	155 lb (70 kg)	(United States) Ridge Lovett	October 23, 2026	24	0
Lightweight Crossover	155 lb (70 kg)	(United States) Henry Cejudo	August 22, 2026	86	0
Featherweight	145 lb (66 kg)	(United States) Real Woods	May 30, 2026	170	0
Featherweight Crossover	145 lb (66 kg)	(United States) Cayden Henschel	September 18, 2026	59	0
Bantamweight	135 lb (61 kg)	(Armenia) Arsen Harutyunyan	September 18, 2026	59	0

=== Women ===
Division	Weight	Champion	Since	Days	Defenses
Middleweight	150 lb (68 kg)	(United States) Kennedy Blades	November 29, 2025	352	5
Bantamweight	130 lb (59 kg)	(United States) Helen Maroulis	October 25, 2025	387	2
Strawweight	120 lb (54 kg)	(Ecuador) Lucía Yépez	June 23, 2026	116	2

== Men's championship history ==
=== Heavyweight Championship ===
216 to 285 lb (98 to 129 kg)

No.	Name	Event	Date	Reign (Total)	Defenses
1	(United States) Wyatt Hendrickson def. Mostafa Elders	RAF 01; Cleveland, OH, US	Aug 30, 2025	443 days (incumbent)	1. def. Mason Parris at RAF 04 on Dec 20, 2025; 2. def. Trent Hillger at RAF 07 on Mar 28, 2026

=== Light Heavyweight Championship ===
191 to 215 lb (87 to 98 kg)

No.	Name	Event	Date	Reign (Total)	Defenses
1	(United States) Bo Nickal def. Jacob Cardenas	RAF 01; Cleveland, OH, US	Aug 30, 2025	181 days	
—	(Cuba) Yoel Romero def. Pat Downey for interim title	RAF 04; Fishers, IN, US	Dec 20, 2025	—	
Romero was stripped of the interim title on January 10, 2026, after missing weight at RAF 05.
Nickal was stripped of the title on February 27, 2026, after the weight class changed from 205 lb to 215 lb
2	(United States) Kyle Snyder def. Akhmed Tazhudinov	RAF 07; Tampa, FL, US	Mar 28, 2026	233 days (incumbent)	1. def. Rizabek Aitmukhan at RAF 08 on Apr 18, 2026; 2. def. Givi Matcharashvili at RAF 09 on May 30, 2026; 3. def. Abdulrashid Sadulaev at RAF Georgia on Jul 11, 2026; 4. def. Akhmed Tazhudinov at RAF Moscow on Sep 5, 2026; 5. def. Shamil Erdogan at RAF Abu Dhabi on Nov 14, 2026

=== Cruiserweight Championship ===
176 to 190 lb (80 to 86 kg)

No.	Name	Event	Date	Reign (Total)	Defenses
1	(United States) Kyle Dake def. Dean Hamiti	RAF 01; Cleveland, OH, US	Aug 30, 2025	443 days (incumbent)	1. def. Boris Makoev at RAF 02 on Oct 25, 2025; 2. def. Mahamedkhabib Kadzimahamedau at RAF 05 on Jan 10, 2026; 3. def. Parker Keckeisen at RAF 07 on Mar 28, 2026; 4. def. Vladimer Gamkrelidze at RAF Georgia on Jul 11, 2026; 5. def. Mahamedkhabib Kadzimahamedau at RAF Moscow on Sep 5, 2026; 6. def. Alp Arslan Begenjov at RAF Abu Dhabi on Nov 14, 2026

=== Middleweight Championship ===
166 to 175 lb (75 to 79 kg)

No.	Name	Event	Date	Reign (Total)	Defenses
1	(United States) Evan Wick def. Jason Nolf	RAF 01; Cleveland, OH, US	Aug 30, 2025	112 days	
2	(United States) Dean Hamiti	RAF 04; Fishers, IN, US	Dec 20, 2025	186 days	
Hamiti was stripped of the title on June 23, 2026.
3	(United States) Jason Nolf	RAF 12; Cleveland, OH, US	Aug 22, 2026	86 days (incumbent)	1. def. Julian Ramirez at RAF 13 on Sep 18, 2026

=== Welterweight Championship ===
156 to 165 lb (71 to 75 kg)

No.	Name	Event	Date	Reign (Total)	Defenses
1	(United States) David Carr def. Amr Reda Hussen	RAF 02; State College, PA, US	Oct 25, 2025	377 days	1. def. Bubba Jenkins at RAF 06 on Feb 28, 2026; 2. def. Tajmuraz Salkazanov at RAF 12 on Aug 22, 2026
Carr was stripped of the title on November 6, 2026 due to inactivity.
2	TBD def. TBD	RAF 15; Hoffman Estates, IL, US	Nov 28, 2026		

=== Lightweight Championship ===
146 to 155 lb (66 to 70 kg)

No.	Name	Event	Date	Reign (Total)	Defenses
1	(United States) Yianni Diakomihalis def. Bajrang Punia	RAF 01; Cleveland, OH, US	Aug 30, 2025	225 days	
Diakomihalis was stripped of the title on April 12, 2026.
2	(United States) Ridge Lovett def. Jordan Oliver	RAF 14; Las Vegas, NV, US	Oct 23, 2026	24 days (incumbent)	

=== Featherweight Championship ===
136 to 145 lb (62 to 66 kg)

No.	Name	Event	Date	Reign (Total)	Defenses
1	(United States) Real Woods def. Darrion Caldwell	RAF 01; Cleveland, OH, US	Aug 30, 2025	91 days	
2	(United States) Jordan Oliver	RAF 03; Chicago, IL, US	Nov 29, 2025	42 days	
Oliver was stripped of the title on January 10, 2026, after missing weight at RAF 05.
3	(United States) Real Woods (2) def. Ibragim Ilyasov	RAF 09; Arlington, TX, US	May 30, 2026	170 days (incumbent)	

=== Bantamweight Championship ===
126 to 135 lb (57 to 61 kg)

No.	Name	Event	Date	Reign (Total)	Defenses
1	(United States) Nathan Tomasello def. Matt Ramos	RAF 01; Cleveland, OH, US	Aug 30, 2025	133 days	1. def. Matt Ramos at RAF 02 on Oct 25, 2025
2	(United States) Austin DeSanto	RAF 05; Sunrise, FL, US	Jan 10, 2026	251 day	1. def. Reineri Andreu at RAF 10 on June 13, 2026
3	(Armenia) Arsen Harutyunyan	RAF 13; Miami, FL, US	Sep 18, 2026	59 days (incumbent)	

== Women's championship history ==
=== Women's Cruiserweight Championship ===
151 to 170 lb (68 to 77 kg)

No.	Name	Event	Date	Reign (Total)	Defenses
1	TBD def. TBD				

=== Women's Middleweight Championship ===
141 to 150 lb (64 to 68 kg)

No.	Name	Event	Date	Reign (Total)	Defenses
1	(United States) Kennedy Blades def. Alejandra Rivera	RAF 03; Chicago, IL, US	Nov 29, 2025	352 days (incumbent)	1. def. Alara Boyd at RAF 04 on Dec 20, 2025; 2. def. Milana Dudieva at RAF 07 on Mar 28, 2026; 3. def. Vusala Parfianovich at RAF Moscow on Sep 5, 2026; 4. def. Diana Avsaragova at RAF 13 on Sep 18, 2026; 5. def. Bella Mir at RAF Abu Dhabi on Nov 14, 2026

=== Women's Bantamweight Championship ===
121 to 130 lb (55 to 59 kg)

- The Women's Bantamweight Championship was known as the Women's Flyweight Championship prior to RAF 08.

No.	Name	Event	Date	Reign (Total)	Defenses
1	(United States) Helen Maroulis def. Samantha Stewart	RAF 02; State College, PA, US	Oct 25, 2025	387 days (incumbent)	1. def. Alexis Janiak at RAF 08 on Apr 18, 2026; 2. def. Anhelina Lysak at RAF Georgia on Jul 11, 2026

=== Women's Strawweight Championship ===
111 to 120 lb (50 to 54 kg)

No.	Name	Event	Date	Reign (Total)	Defenses
1	(United States) Sarah Hildebrandt def. Zeltzin Hernandez	RAF 01; Cleveland, OH, US	Aug 30, 2025	297 days	
—	(Ecuador) Lucía Yépez def. Kendra Ryan for interim title	RAF 10; St. Louis, MO, US	Jun 13, 2026	—	
Hildebrandt was stripped of the title on June 23, 2026.
2	(Ecuador) Lucía Yépez promoted to undisputed champion	—	Jun 23, 2026	146 days (incumbent)	1. def. Felicity Taylor at RAF 11 on Jul 18, 2026; 2. def. Sarah Hildebrandt at RAF 14 on Oct 23, 2026

== Crossover Championship History ==
The RAF created the Crossover Cruiserweight Championship titles as a symbolic special attraction title for athletes crossing over from other sports to compete on the RAF mats. The belt allows non‑RAF competitors, including former UFC fighters, collegiate wrestlers, grapplers, and other crossover athletes, to participate in featured bouts without entering the official cruiserweight rankings or affecting the divisional title lineage.

=== Light Heavyweight Crossover Championship ===
191 to 215 lb (87 to 98 kg)

No.	Name	Event	Date	Reign (Total)	Defenses
1	(United Arab Emirates) Khamzat Chimaev def. Chris Weidman	RAF Abu Dhabi; Abu Dhabi, UAE	November 14, 2026	2 days (incumbent)	

=== Cruiserweight Crossover Championship ===
176 to 190 lb (80 to 86 kg)

No.	Name	Event	Date	Reign (Total)	Defenses
1	(United States) Colby Covington def. Arman Tsarukyan	RAF 11; Milwaukee, WI, US	July 18, 2026	123 days (incumbent)	1. def. Belal Muhammad at RAF 13 on Sep 18, 2026

=== Middleweight Crossover Championship ===
166 to 175 lb (75 to 79 kg)

No.	Name	Event	Date	Reign (Total)	Defenses
1	(Armenia) Arman Tsarukyan def. Dillon Danis	RAF 14; Las Vegas, NV, US	October 23, 2026	24 days (incumbent)	

=== Lightweight Crossover Championship ===
146 to 155 lb (66 to 70 kg)

No.	Name	Event	Date	Reign (Total)	Defenses
1	(United States) Henry Cejudo def. Merab Dvalishvili	RAF 12; Cleveland, OH, US	August 22, 2026	86 days (incumbent)	

=== Featherweight Crossover Championship ===
136 to 145 lb (62 to 66 kg)

No.	Name	Event	Date	Reign (Total)	Defenses
1	(United States) Cayden Henschel def. Johnni DiJulius	RAF 13; Miami, FL, US	September 18, 2026	59 days (incumbent)	

== Honorary championship history ==
=== Legends Championship ===
No.	Name	Event	Date	Accolades	Ref
1	(United States) Nate Carr	RAF 06; Tempe, AZ, US	February 28, 2026	Olympic bronze medalist (1988); Three-time NCAA Division I Champion (1981, 1982, 1983)	
2	(United States) Ryan Blackwell	RAF 07; Tampa, FL, US	March 28, 2026	Navy and Marine Corps Medal recipient (2020); Two-time NCHSAA champion (2009, 2010)	
3	(United States) Dan Gable	RAF 10; St. Louis, MO, US	June 13, 2026	Olympic gold medalist (1972); World Champion (1971); Two-time NCAA Division I Champion (1968, 1969)	
