= Dean Hamiti =

American wrestler (born 2003)

Personal information
- Full name: Dean Hamiti
- Born: June 19, 2003 (age 23) Joliet, Illinois, U.S.
- Weight: 79 kg (174 lb)

Sport
- Country: United States
- Sport: Wrestling
- Events: Freestyle and Folkstyle
- College team: Oklahoma State; Wisconsin
- Club: Cowboy RTC
- Coached by: David Taylor
Medal record
Men's freestyle wrestling
Representing the United States
Grand Prix
Silver medal – second place	2026 Zagreb	79 kg
Silver medal – second place	2026 Tirana	79 kg
Bronze medal – third place	2025 Warsaw	79 kg
US National Championships
Silver medal – second place	2025 Las Vegas	79 kg
Men's collegiate wrestling
Representing the Oklahoma State Cowboys
NCAA Division I Championships
Gold medal – first place	2025 Philadelphia	174 lb
Big 12 Championships
Silver medal – second place	2025 Tulsa	174 lb
Representing the Wisconsin Badgers
Big Ten Championships
Gold medal – first place	2023 Ann Arbor	165 lb
Silver medal – second place	2024 College Park	165 lb
Bronze medal – third place	2022 Lincoln	165 lb

Dean Hamiti (born June 19, 2003) is an American freestyle and former folkstyle wrestler who competes at 79 kilograms. The 2025 174 lb NCAA champion, Hamiti finished a 3-time all American, 2023 Big 10 champion and a 4-time NCAA Qualifier.

He competed in the Middleweight division of Real American Freestyle (RAF), where he is a former RAF Middleweight Champion.

== Folkstyle career ==
=== Early life ===
Hamiti competed in high school for Joliet Catholic Academy where he finished his high school career with a 148-8 record, a 3-time HSA Wrestling State champion and the Illinois Dave Schultz High School Excellence Award winner. Hamiti was unable to compete for a fourth state title due to the covid-19 pandemic.

=== Wisconsin ===
==== 2021-2022 ====
As a true freshman for Wisconsin at 165 lb, Hamiti punched his ticket to the NCAA tournament with a 3rd place finish at the Big Ten tournament. With a 24-2 regular season record, Hamiti was named the Big Ten's Freshman of the Year. Hamiti finished his first nationals with a 6th place finish at the 2022 NCAA Tournament ending the tournament with a 4-2 record, medically forfeiting the 5th place match to Iowa's Alex Marinelli.

==== 2022-2023 ====
As a sophomore, Hamiti improved on his prior year performance by capturing the 165 lb Big Ten Tournament title, defeating Iowa's Patrick Kennedy 9-6 to take gold and clinch a berth to his second NCAA tournament. At the 2023 NCAA Division I Wrestling Championships, Hamiti once again captured a spot on the podium finishing in 6th place at 165 lb and a 4-3 tournament record. Hamiti ended the season with a 25-6 record.

==== 2023-2024 ====
Once again at 165 lb, Hamiti qualified for his third NCAA tournament finishing second at the Big Ten Tournament, defeating Nebraska's Antrell Taylor by Fall in the semifinals. In the finals, Hamiti was defeated by Penn State's Mitchell Mesenbrink 13-11. At the 2024 NCAA Division I Wrestling Championships, Hamiti failed to reach all-American status for the third consecutive year, falling in the quarterfinals to Iowa State's David Carr 5-0 and to Oklahoma State's Izzak Oleknik in the blood round, via overtime, 9-6. Hamiti finished the season with a 28-4 record.

=== Oklahoma State ===
Hamiti entered the transfer portal after his junior season at Wisconsin and on March 27, 2024, committed to Oklahoma State. Hamiti moved up a weight class to 174 lb to end his college career. After an undefeated regular season, Hamiti fell 7-4 in sudden victory to Missouri's Keegan O'Toole in the Big 12 Tournament Finals. Hamiti entered the 2025 NCAA Division I Men's Wrestling Championships as the 3-seed at 174 lb. Hamiti advanced to the semi-finals with two bonus point victories before defeating Iowa's Patrick Kennedy 8-6 in the quarterfinals. In the semifinals Hamiti defeated reigning national champion, Penn State's Levi Haines, 4-2. Hamiti faced a rematch of the Big 12 Tournament finals against Missouri's Keegan O'Toole. Hamiti got his revenge defeating O'Toole 4-1 in sudden victory to win his first national championship. Hamiti finished his championship season with a 27-1 record.

== Freestyle career ==
=== 2025 ===
Hamiti made his freestyle debut at the 2025 US Open at 79 kg. Hamiti advanced to the finals after winning four straight matches before falling to Evan Wick 9-1 to take silver. Hamiti competed at the 2025 World Team Trials at 79 kg. Hamiti again took silver, winning his first two matches before falling to Levi Haines in a rematch of the 2025 NCAA semifinals 10-2. Hamiti signed with Real American Freestyle and competed at RAF 01 against Kyle Dake for the inaugural RAF Cruiserweight Championship. Hamiti fell via technical fall 11-0. He later defeated Evan Wick at RAF 04 to capture the RAF Middleweight Championship.

== Freestyle Record ==
Senior Freestyle Matches
Res.	Record	Opponent	Score	Date	Event	Location
2026 US Open 8th at 79 kg
Loss		(United States) Matthew Singleton	FF	April 25, 2026	2025 US Open	(United States) Las Vegas, Nevada
Loss		(United States) William Henckel	FF	April 25, 2026	2025 US Open	(United States) Las Vegas, Nevada
Win	19-8	(United States) Ethan Riddle	Fall	April 25, 2026	2025 US Open	(United States) Las Vegas, Nevada
Loss	18-8	(United States) Muhamed McBryde	1-4	April 25, 2026	2025 US Open	(United States) Las Vegas, Nevada
Win	18-7	(United States) Dajuan Johnson	11-8	April 25, 2026	2025 US Open	(United States) Las Vegas, Nevada
Win	17-7	(United States) Drake Bowers	TF 10-0	April 25, 2026	2025 US Open	(United States) Las Vegas, Nevada
2026 Muhamet Malo Ranking Series (silver) at 79 kg
Loss	16–7	(Iran) Mohammad Nokhodi	TF 0–10	February 26, 2026	2026 Muhamet Malo Tournament	Tirana, Albania
Win	16–6	(United States) Cam Amine	5–3	February 26, 2026	2026 Muhamet Malo Tournament	Tirana, Albania
Win	15–6	(Georgia (country)) Luka Chkhitunidze	Fall	February 26, 2026	2026 Muhamet Malo Tournament	Tirana, Albania
2026 Grand Prix Zagreb Open (silver) at 79 kg
Loss	14-6	(France) Zelimkhan Khadjiev	4–4	February 5, 2026	2026 Grand Prix Zagreb Open	Zagreb, Croatia
Win	14-5	(United States) Evan Wick	6-5	February 5, 2026	2026 Grand Prix Zagreb Open	Zagreb, Croatia
Win	13-5	(United States) Daniel Braunagel	TF 10-0	February 5, 2026	2026 Grand Prix Zagreb Open	Zagreb, Croatia
RAF 04 175lb (Won RAF Middleweight Championship)
Win	12-5	(United States) Evan Wick	Fall	December 20, 2025	RAF 04	(United States) Fishers, Indiana
Loss	11-5	(France) Seyfulla Itaev	2-3	November 29, 2025	Cowboy RTC vs France	(United States) Durant, Oklahoma
RAF 01 190 lb (For Inaugural RAF Cruiserweight Championship)
Loss	11-4	(United States) Kyle Dake	TF 0-11	August 30, 2025	RAF 01	(United States) Cleveland, Ohio
2025 Poland Open (bronze) at 79 kg
Win	11-3	(Switzerland) Umar Mavlaev	9-4	August 3, 2025	2025 Poland Open	Warsaw, Poland
Win	10-3	(Algeria) Abdelkader Ikkal	Fall	August 3, 2025	2025 Poland Open	Warsaw, Poland
Win	9-3	(Germany) Pouria Taherkhani	2-0	August 3, 2025	2025 Poland Open	Warsaw, Poland
Win	8-3	(Serbia) Codei Khawaja	TF 10-0	August 3, 2025	2025 Poland Open	Warsaw, Poland
Loss	7-3	(Ukraine) Vasyl Mykhailov	TF 0-10	August 3, 2025	2025 Poland Open	Warsaw, Poland
Win	7-2	(Russia) Mokhamed Nasirkhaev	Fall	July 21, 2025	PWL 9 - USA vs Russia	Budapest, Hungary
2025 World Team Trials (silver) at 79 kg
Loss	6-2	(United States) Levi Haines	2-10	May 17, 2025	2025 World Team Trials	(United States) Louisville, Kentucky
Win	6-1	(United States) Simon Ruiz	5–3	May 17, 2025	2025 World Team Trials	(United States) Louisville, Kentucky
Win	5-1	(United States) Ethan Riddle	TF 11–0	May 17, 2025	2025 World Team Trials	(United States) Louisville, Kentucky
2025 US Open (silver) at 79 kg
Loss	4-1	(United States) Evan Wick	1-9	April 27, 2025	2025 US Open	(United States) Las Vegas, Nevada
Win	4-0	(United States) Kennedy Monday	TF 14–4	April 27, 2025	2025 US Open	(United States) Las Vegas, Nevada
Win	3-0	(United States) Dajun Johnson	Fall	April 27, 2025	2025 US Open	(United States) Las Vegas, Nevada
Win	2-0	(United States) Kevin Reynolds	TF 10–0	April 27, 2025	2025 US Open	(United States) Las Vegas, Nevada
Win	1-0	(United States) William Hunter	TF 10–0	April 27, 2025	2025 US Open	(United States) Las Vegas, Nevada
