= Patrick Downey =

Patrick or Pat Downey may refer to:

- Pat Downey (barrister) (1927–2017), New Zealand lawyer
- Pat Downey (American football) (born 1974), American football center
- Pat Downey (wrestler) (born 1992), American freestyle wrestler
