= RAF 10 =

2026 wrestling event

RAF 10: Chimaev vs. Danis
- The poster for RAF 10: Chimaev vs. Danis
- Promotion: Real American Freestyle
- Date: June 13, 2026
- Venue: Chaifetz Arena
- City: St. Louis, Missouri
- Attendance: 4,058

Event chronology
RAF 09: Steveson vs. Romanov	RAF 10: Chimaev vs. Danis	RAF Georgia: Dvalishvili vs. Cejudo

RAF 10: Chimaev vs. Danis was a freestyle wrestling event produced by the Real American Freestyle (RAF) promotion that took place on June 13, 2026, at the Chaifetz Arena in St. Louis, Missouri.

== Background ==
The event was headlined by a 205-pound catchweight bout between undefeated former UFC Middleweight Champion Khamzat Chimaev and Dillon Danis, with Chimaev making his promotional debut.

A middleweight bout between former Arman Tsarukyan and former interim UFC Lightweight Champion Tony Ferguson (also promotional newcomer) co-headlined the event.

An RAF Bantamweight Championship bout between champion Austin DeSanto and Reineri Andreu took place at the event. In addition, a RAF Women's Strawweight Championship bout for the interim title between Lucía Yépez and Kendra Ryan also took place at the event.

A bantamweight bout between two-time European wrestling champion (also two-time U23 world champion) Arsen Harutyunyan and 2024 Summer Olympics men's freestyle 57 kg gold medalist Rei Higuchi was scheduled to take place at the event. However, Higuchi withdrew for undisclosed reasons and was replaced by Caleb Smith.

1972 Olympic gold medalist, 1971 World Champion and two-time NCAA Division I Champion (1968, 1969) Dan Gable was awarded an honorary RAF Legends Championship during the broadcast.

== Results ==
Main card (Fox Nation)
Weight class				Method	Round	Time	Notes
Catchweight (205 lb)	(United Arab Emirates) Khamzat Chimaev	def.	(United States) Dillon Danis	Pinfall	1	0:44
Middleweight	(Armenia) Arman Tsarukyan	def.	(United States) Tony Ferguson	Technical fall (10–0)	2	0:38
Lightweight	(United States) Aaron Pico	def.	(United States) Lance Palmer	Technical fall (12–1)	2	1:01
Women's Strawweight	(Ecuador) Lucía Yépez	def.	(United States) Kendra Ryan	Technical fall (12–2)	1	1:11	(Note: For the interim RAF Women's Strawweight Championship.)
Bantamweight	(United States) Austin DeSanto (c)	def.	(Cuba) Reineri Andreu	Decision (2–1)	3	2:00	(Note: For the RAF Bantamweight Championship.)
Light Heavyweight	(Kazakhstan) Rizabek Aitmukhan	def.	(United States) Hayden Zilmer	Decision (6–4)	3	2:00
Lightweight	(Puerto Rico) Sebastian Rivera	def.	(Azerbaijan) Haji Aliyev	Decision (9–5)	3	2:00
Welterweight	(United States) Keegan O'Toole	def.	(Uzbekistan) Bekzod Abdurakhmonov	Decision (10–6)	3	2:00
Featherweight	(United States) Andrew Alirez	def.	(United States) Jaydin Eierman	Decision (5–3)	3	2:00
Heavyweight	(Russia) Shamil Sharipov	def.	(Cuba) Yonger Bastida	Decision (5–3)	3	2:00
Bantamweight	(Armenia) Arsen Harutyunyan	def.	(United States) Caleb Smith	Technical fall (14–4)	2	1:11

== Bonus awards ==
The following athletes received bonuses.

- Match of the Night: Keegan O'Toole vs. Bekzod Abdurakhmonov
- Performance of the Night: Sebastian Rivera

== See also ==
- List of RAF events
