= RAF 08 =

2026 wrestling event

RAF 08: Tsarukyan vs. Faber
- The poster for RAF 08: Tsarukyan vs. Faber
- Promotion: Real American Freestyle
- Date: April 18, 2026
- Venue: Liacouras Center
- City: Philadelphia, Pennsylvania
- Attendance: 4,250

Event chronology
RAF 07: Tsarukyan vs. Poullas 2	RAF 08: Tsarukyan vs. Faber	RAF 09: Steveson vs. Romanov

RAF 08: Tsarukyan vs. Faber was a freestyle wrestling event produced by the Real American Freestyle (RAF) promotion that took place on April 18, 2026 at the Liacouras Center in Philadelphia, Pennsylvania.

== Background ==
A middleweight bout between Arman Tsarukyan and former WEC Featherweight Champion (also former UFC Bantamweight Championship challenger) Urijah Faber headlined the event. Former UFC Bantamweight Champion Merab Dvalishvili was originally scheduled to face former UFC Flyweight and Bantamweight Champion (also 2008 Olympic gold medalist in freestyle wrestling) Henry Cejudo in the main event, but Cejudo had to withdraw hours prior to the event.

An RAF Light Heavyweight Championship bout between reigning champion Kyle Snyder and Rizabek Aitmukhan served as the co-main event. They competed in February 2025 with Snyder winning by decision.

An RAF Women's Bantamweight Championship between champion Helen Maroulis and Alexis Janiak also took place at the event.

It was announced on the broadcast that then UFC Middleweight Champion Khamzat Chimaev had signed with the promotion and would debut at RAF 10 in June.

== Results ==
Main card (Fox Nation)
Weight class				Method	Round	Time	Notes
Middleweight	(Armenia) Arman Tsarukyan	def.	(United States) Urijah Faber	Technical fall (13–1)	3	0:35
Light Heavyweight	(United States) Kyle Snyder (c)	def.	(Kazakhstan) Rizabek Aitmukhan	Decision (12–6)	3	2:00	(Note: For the RAF Light Heavyweight Championship.)
Cruiserweight	(United States) Zahid Valencia	def.	(United States) Aeoden Sinclair	Decision (8–2)	3	2:00
Heavyweight	(Russia) Shamil Sharipov	def.	(United States) Anthony Cassioppi	Pinfall	1	1:45
Women's Bantamweight	(United States) Helen Maroulis (c)	def.	(United States) Alexis Janiak	Technical fall (10–0)	1	1:13	(Note: For the RAF Women's Bantamweight Championship.)
Featherweight	(United States) Real Woods	def.	(United States) Anthony Ashnault	Decision (7–2)	3	2:00
Middleweight	(United States) Jason Nolf	def.	(United States) Joey Blaze	Decision (11–2)	3	2:00
Featherweight	(Georgia (country)) Vladimer Khinchegashvili	def.	(United States) Johnni DiJulius	Decision (8–5)	3	2:00
Lightweight	(United States) Lance Palmer	def.	(United States) Cayden Henschel	Decision (3–2)	3	2:00
Featherweight	(United States) Jordan Oliver	def.	(United States) Michael Vanschenkbrill	Decision (5–0)	3	2:00
Bantamweight	(United States) Lucas Byrd	def.	(United States) Darian Cruz	Decision (criteria) (2–2)	3	2:00

== Bonus awards ==
The following athletes received bonuses.

- Match of the Night: Kyle Snyder vs. Rizabek Aitmukhan
- Performance of the Night: Jason Nolf

== See also ==
- List of RAF events
