= Real Woods =

American wrestler (born 1999)

Personal information
- Full name: Real Marshall Ray Woods
- Born: December 9, 1999 (age 26) Albuquerque, New Mexico, U.S.
- Height: 5 ft 7 in (170 cm)
- Weight: 65 kg (143 lb)
- Website: realdealwrestling.com

Sport
- Country: United States
- Sport: Wrestling
- Events: Freestyle and Folkstyle
- College team: Iowa; Stanford
- Club: Cliff Keen Wrestling Club; Titan Mercury Wrestling Club; Hawkeye Wrestling Club (formerly); Stanford – California RTC (formerly)
- Coached by: Sergei Beloglazov; Tom Brands (formerly); Terry Brands (formerly)
Medal record
Men's freestyle wrestling
Representing the United States
World Championships
| Bronze medal – third place | 2025 Zagreb | 65 kg |
Pan American Championships
| Gold medal – first place | 2026 Coralville | 65 kg |
Grand Prix
| Silver medal – second place | 2023 Sassari | 65 kg |
| Bronze medal – third place | 2025 Tirana | 65 kg |
U20 Pan American Championships
| Silver medal – second place | 2019 Guatemala City | 65 kg |
Men's collegiate wrestling
NCAA Division I Championships
| Silver medal – second place | 2023 Tulsa | 141 lb |
Big Ten Championships
| Gold medal – first place | 2023 Ann Arbor | 141 lb |
| Bronze medal – third place | 2024 College Park | 141 lb |
Pac-12 Championships
| Gold medal – first place | 2020 Stanford | 141 lb |
| Gold medal – first place | 2022 Tempe | 141 lb |
| Silver medal – second place | 2021 Corvallis | 141 lb |

Real Marshall Ray Woods (born December 9, 1999) is an American freestyle and folkstyle wrestler who competes at 65 kilograms. He currently competes in the Featherweight division of Real American Freestyle (RAF), where he was the inaugural RAF Featherweight Champion.

In freestyle, he qualified to represent the United States at the 2025 World Championships. In folkstyle, Woods was a three-time NCAA Division I All-American, twice for the Iowa Hawkeyes and once for the Stanford Cardinal.

== Career ==
=== High school ===
Born and raised in Albuquerque, New Mexico, Woods moved to Wheaton, Illinois at age 14 so he could attend Montini Catholic High School, mainly due to their wrestling program.

Woods was a three-time IHSA state champion and a four-time finalist, and was highly ranked in the nation when he committed to wrestle at Stanford University in 2017, before graduating high school in 2018.

=== Stanford University ===
After a 19–1 season while wearing a redshirt in 2018–2019 at 141 pounds, Woods became an NCAA qualifier and Pac-12 champion as a redshirt freshman in 2019–2020, posting once again a 19–1 record before the NCAA tournament was cancelled due to the COVID-19 pandemic.

As a sophomore, Woods only competed in the post-season, placing second at the Pac-12 Championships and going 2–2 at the 2021 NCAA tournament, finishing 6–3 on the year. In 2021–2022, he claimed his second Pac-12 title and became an NCAA Division I All-American with a sixth-place finish at the 2022 NCAA tournament, closing out 17–4.

=== University of Iowa ===
After earning a degree from Stanford University, Woods decided to transfer to the University of Iowa for his remaining two years of eligibility.

==== 2022–2023 ====
For his junior year, Woods claimed the Big Ten Conference title and made it to the finals of the NCAA tournament, placing second and closing out the year with a 20–1 record.

After folkstyle season, Woods made his senior level freestyle debut, placing second and going 2–1 at Italy's Sassari City Matteo Pellicone Memorial that took place in June.

==== 2023–2024 ====
For his final season, Woods placed third at the Big Ten Championships, and claimed All-American status for the third time with a fourth-place finish at the NCAA tournament, closing out the year with a 23–5 record and his career with a 104–15 record.

=== Post-collegiate career ===
In August 2024, Woods announced he would move to Michigan to join the Cliff Keen Wrestling Club and pursue freestyle accomplishments.

==== 2025 ====
Woods took the freestyle mat for the second time in his senior level career at the Muhamet Malo Tournament in February. After three dominant wins over foreign opposition, including Bulgaria's European finalist Mikyay Naim, he was stopped by Iran's world champion Rahman Amouzad in the semifinals, which pulled him into a bronze-medal match where he defeated Japan's Kaiji Ogino.

Competing domestically for the first time, Woods placed fourth at the US Open National Championships in April, racking up five victories but falling to Aden Valencia twice.

Woods avenged his losses to Valencia in the first round of May's US World Team Trials Challenge tournament, where he claimed first place after three victories, including over two-time NCAA champion Jesse Mendez. This set him up for a best-of-three series at Final X against US Open champion Joseph McKenna to decide the fate of the US World Team spot.

In June, after two straight victories over McKenna, Woods became the US World Team member at 65 kilograms, and will represent the United States at the World Championships later in the year.

== Freestyle record ==
Senior Freestyle Matches
| Res. | Record | Opponent | Score | Date | Event | Location |
2026 Pan American Championships (gold) at 65 kg
| Win | 25–7 | (Canada) Peiman Biabani | 3–2 | May 10, 2026 | 2026 Pan American Wrestling Championships | (United States) Coralville, Iowa |
| Win | 24–7 | (The Bahamas) Shannon Hanna II | 9–0 | May 10, 2026 | 2026 Pan American Wrestling Championships | (United States) Coralville, Iowa |
| Win | 23–7 | (Dominican Republic) Tommy Garcia | TF 14–4 | May 10, 2026 | 2026 Pan American Wrestling Championships | (United States) Coralville, Iowa |
| Win | 22–7 | (United States) Anthony Ashnault | 7-2 | April 18, 2026 | RAF 08 | (United States) Philadelphia, Pennsylvania |
| Loss | 21–7 | (United States) Jordan Oliver | 3–3 | January 10, 2026 | RAF 05 | (United States) Sunrise, Florida |
| Loss | 21-6 | (United States) Jordan Oliver | 2–2 | November 29, 2025 | RAF 03 | (United States) Chicago, Illinois |
2025 World Championships (bronze) at 65 kg
| Win | 21–5 | (Canada) Peiman Biabani | 3-1 | September 15–16, 2025 | 2025 World Championships | Zagreb, Croatia |
| Win | 20–5 | (India) Sujeet Kalkal | 7-5 | September 15–16, 2025 | 2025 World Championships | Zagreb, Croatia |
| Win | 19–5 | (Kyrgyzstan) Ikromzhon Khadzhimurodov | TF 10–0 | September 15–16, 2025 | 2025 World Championships | Zagreb, Croatia |
| Loss | 18–5 | (Iran) Rahman Amouzad | TF 1–12 | September 15–16, 2025 | 2025 World Championships | Zagreb, Croatia |
| Win | 18–4 | (Moldova) Maxim Saculțan | TF 14–2 | September 15–16, 2025 | 2025 World Championships | Zagreb, Croatia |
RAF 01 145 lb (Won Inaugural RAF Featherweight Championship)
| Win | 17–4 | (United States) Darrion Caldwell | Fall | August 30, 2025 | RAF 01 | (United States) Cleveland, Ohio |
2025 US World Team Trials (gold) at 65 kg
| Win | 16–4 | (United States) Joseph McKenna | 4–4 | June 14, 2025 | 2025 Final X | (United States) Newark, New Jersey |
| Win | 15–4 | (United States) Joseph McKenna | 7–5 | June 14, 2025 | 2025 Final X | (United States) Newark, New Jersey |
| Win | 14–4 | (United States) Brock Hardy | 10–6 | May 16–17, 2025 | 2025 US World Team Trials Challenge | (United States) Louisville, Kentucky |
| Win | 13–4 | (United States) Jesse Mendez | 11–9 | May 16–17, 2025 | 2025 US World Team Trials Challenge | (United States) Louisville, Kentucky |
| Win | 12–4 | (United States) Aden Valencia | 6–4 | May 16–17, 2025 | 2025 US World Team Trials Challenge | (United States) Louisville, Kentucky |
2025 US Open 4th at 65 kg
| Loss | 11–4 | (United States) Aden Valencia | 3–5 | April 23–27, 2025 | 2025 US Open National Championships | (United States) Las Vegas, Nevada |
| Win | 11–3 | (United States) Beau Bartlett | 9–8 | April 23–27, 2025 | 2025 US Open National Championships | (United States) Las Vegas, Nevada |
| Win | 10–3 | (United States) Tom Crook | TF 10–0 | April 23–27, 2025 | 2025 US Open National Championships | (United States) Las Vegas, Nevada |
| Win | 9–3 | (United States) Luke Simcox | TF 13–1 | April 23–27, 2025 | 2025 US Open National Championships | (United States) Las Vegas, Nevada |
| Loss | 8–3 | (United States) Aden Valencia | 4–5 | April 23–27, 2025 | 2025 US Open National Championships | (United States) Las Vegas, Nevada |
| Win | 8–2 | (United States) Noah Ingram | Fall | April 23–27, 2025 | 2025 US Open National Championships | (United States) Las Vegas, Nevada |
| Win | 7–2 | (United States) Marcus Spallino | TF 10–0 | April 23–27, 2025 | 2025 US Open National Championships | (United States) Las Vegas, Nevada |
2025 Muhamet Malo International (bronze) at 65 kg
| Win | 6–2 | (Japan) Kaiji Ogino | 9–1 | February 26, 2025 | 2025 Muhamet Malo Tournament | Tirana, Albania |
| Loss | 5–2 | (Iran) Rahman Amouzad | 2–11 | February 26, 2025 | 2025 Muhamet Malo Tournament | Tirana, Albania |
| Win | 5–1 | (Kazakhstan) Adlan Askarov | TF 10–0 | February 26, 2025 | 2025 Muhamet Malo Tournament | Tirana, Albania |
| Win | 4–1 | (Bulgaria) Mikyay Naim | TF 10–0 | February 26, 2025 | 2025 Muhamet Malo Tournament | Tirana, Albania |
| Win | 3–1 | (China) Congbao Xie | 10–1 | February 26, 2025 | 2025 Muhamet Malo Tournament | Tirana, Albania |
2023 Matteo Pellicone Memorial (silver) at 65 kg
| Loss | 2–1 | (Belgium) Ayub Musaev | 2–4 | June 9, 2023 | 2023 Sassari City Matteo Pellicone Memorial | Sassari, Italy |
| Win | 2–0 | (Ukraine) Yaroslav Hurskyy | TF 12–2 | June 9, 2023 | 2023 Sassari City Matteo Pellicone Memorial | Sassari, Italy |
| Win | 1–0 | (Spain) Felipe Ferrusola | TF 10–0 | June 9, 2023 | 2023 Sassari City Matteo Pellicone Memorial | Sassari, Italy |
