= RAF 04 =

2025 wrestling event

RAF 04: Hendrickson vs. Parris
- The poster for RAF 04: Hendrickson vs. Parris
- Promotion: Real American Freestyle
- Date: December 20, 2025
- Venue: Fishers Event Center
- City: Fishers, Indiana
- Attendance: 3,342

Event chronology
RAF 03: Mendes vs. Chandler	RAF 04: Hendrickson vs. Parris	RAF 05: Covington vs. Rockhold

RAF 04: Hendrickson vs. Parris was a freestyle wrestling event that took place on December 20, 2025, at the Fishers Event Center in Fishers, Indiana.

It was the fourth flagship event produced by the Real American Freestyle (RAF) promotion, and aired live on Fox Nation.

== Background ==
Tickets for the event went on sale through Ticketmaster on November 14, 2025.

Commentary for the event's live Fox Nation broadcast was provided by Kurt Angle, Ben Askren, Julianna Peña, Jimmy Smith, and Chael Sonnen.

Mason Parris had issued a challenge to RAF Heavyweight Champion Wyatt Hendrickson during the RAF 01 broadcast, leading to their headlining bout at this event.

RAF Light Heavyweight Champion Bo Nickal was scheduled to defend his title against Yoel Romero at this event, but withdrew for undisclosed reasons. Pat Downey replaced Nickal, and he faced Romero for an interim championship.

RAF Lightweight Champion Yianni Diakomihalis was scheduled to defend his title against Austin Gomez at this event, but the bout was postponed to a future card due to injury.

RAF Women's Strawweight Champion Sarah Hildebrandt was scheduled to defend her title against Maria Prevolaraki at this event, but the bout was postponed to a future card due to injury.

== Results ==
Main card (Fox Nation)
Weight class				Method	Round	Time	Notes
Heavyweight	(United States) Wyatt Hendrickson (c)	def.	(United States) Mason Parris	Technical fall (13–2)	2	0:49	(Note: For the RAF Heavyweight Championship.)
Light Heavyweight	(Cuba) Yoel Romero	def.	(United States) Pat Downey	Technical fall (10–0)	3	0:11	(Note: For the interim RAF Light Heavyweight Championship.)
Catchweight (185 lbs.)	(United States) David Carr	def.	(Palestine) Belal Muhammad	Technical fall (10–0)	2	0:29
Women’s Middleweight	(United States) Kennedy Blades (c)	def.	(United States) Alara Boyd	Technical fall (10–0)	1	1:39	(Note: For the RAF Women's Middleweight Championship.)
Cruiserweight	(Belarus) Mahamedkhabib Kadzimahamedau	def.	(United States) Dustin Plott	Decision (11–7)	3	2:00	(Note: RAF Cruiserweight title eliminator.)
Middleweight	(United States) Dean Hamiti	def.	(United States) Evan Wick (c)	Pinfall	3	1:00	(Note: For the RAF Middleweight Championship.)
Cruiserweight	(United States) Parker Keckeisen	def.	(United States) Zahid Valencia	Decision (10–2)	3	2:00
Light Heavyweight	(United States) Trent Hidlay	def.	(United States) Jacob Cardenas	Decision (5–3)	3	2:00
Middleweight	(United States) Jason Nolf	def.	(United States) Andy Varela	Technical fall (10–0)	2	0:09

== Bonus awards ==
The following athletes received bonuses.

- Match of the Night: Parker Keckeisen vs. Zahid Valencia

== See also ==
- List of RAF events
