= Mahamedkhabib Kadzimahamedau =

Belarusian sport wrestler (born 1994)

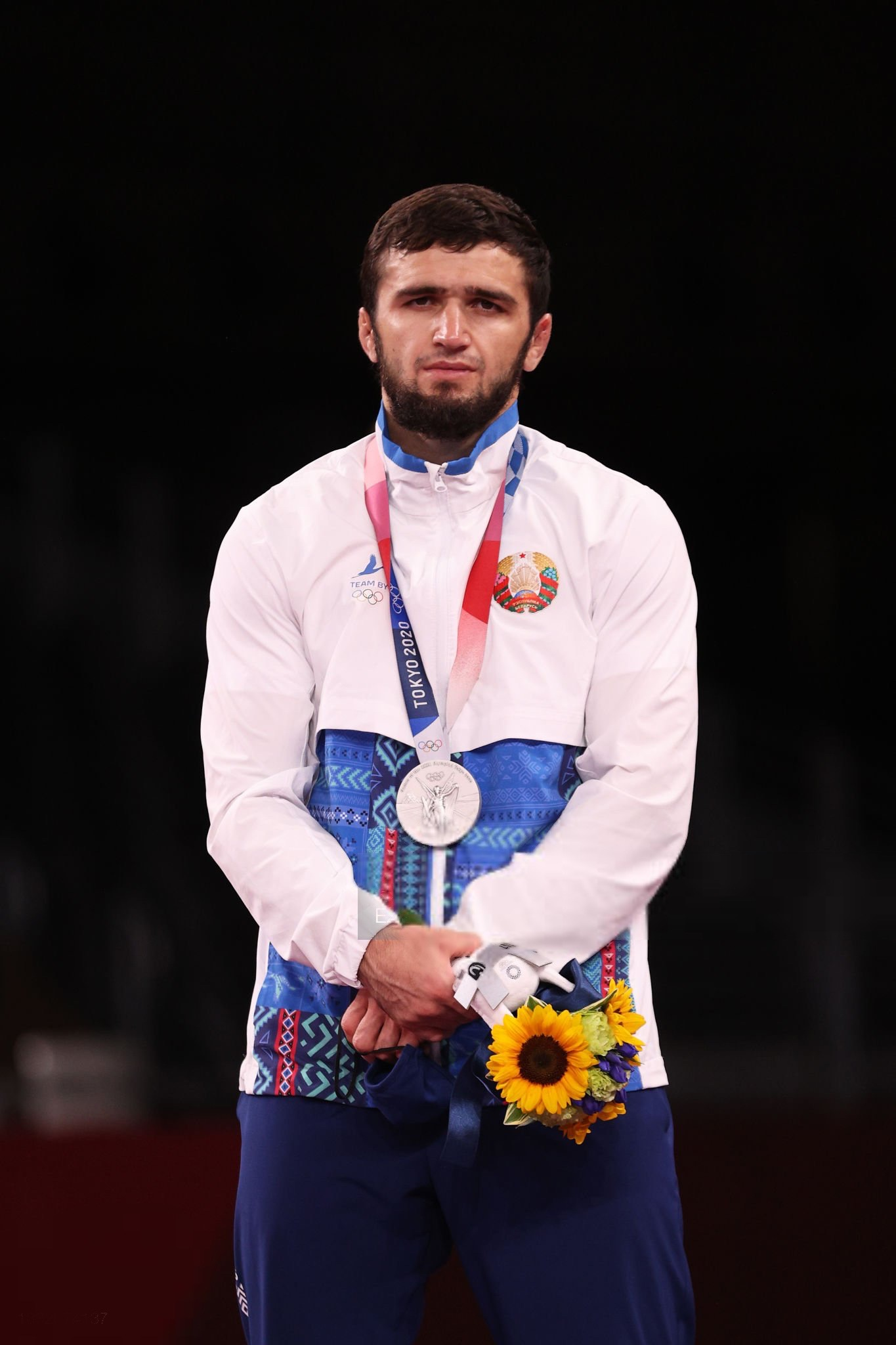
- Kadzimahamedau in 2021

Personal information
- Native name: Махамедхабиб Зайнудзинавич Кадзимахамедау
- Full name: Mahamedkhabib Zaynudzinavich Kadzimahamedau
- Nickname: Kadik
- Nationality: Belarus
- Born: 26 May 1994 (age 32) Tsumadinsky District, Dagestan, Russia
- Height: 1.75 m (5 ft 9 in)

Sport
- Country: Russia; Belarus (since 2020)
- Sport: Wrestling
- Weight class: 74 kg
- Rank: International Master of Sports
- Event: Freestyle
- Club: Gadzhi Makhachev WC; SCOR-3
- Coached by: Gasan Abdulbasirov, Muslim Amirsalanov

Achievements and titles
- Olympic finals: (silver) (2020)
- World finals: (bronze) (2026)
- Regional finals: (gold) (2020)
- National finals: (gold) (2017)
Medal record
Men's freestyle wrestling
Representing Belarus
Olympic Games
Silver medal – second place	2020 Tokyo	74 kg
World Championships
Bronze medal – third place	2026 Astana	79 kg
Individual World Cup
Bronze medal – third place	2020 Belgrade	79 kg
European Championships
Gold medal – first place	2020 Rome	79 kg
Ivan Yarygin Cup
Gold medal – first place	2024 Krasnoyarsk	74 kg
Representing United World Wrestling
European Championships
Silver medal – second place	2025 Bratislava	86 kg
Representing Individual Neutral Athletes
European Championships
Silver medal – second place	2024 Bucharest	79 kg
Representing Dagestan
Russian National Championships
Gold medal – first place	2017 Nazran	70 kg
Golden Grand Prix Ivan Yarygin
Bronze medal – third place	2017 Krasnoyarsk	70 kg
Representing Russia
Yasar Dogu Tournament
Gold medal – first place	2017 Istanbul	70 kg
Dan Kolov & Nikola Petrov Tournament
Bronze medal – third place	2018 Sofia	74 kg

Mahamedkhabib Zaynudzinavich Kadzimahamedau (Note: Belarusian: Магамедхабіб Зайнудзінавіч Кадзімагамедаў) or Magomedkhabib Zainudinovich Kadimagomedov (Note: Russian: Магомедхабиб Зайнудинович Кадимагомедов) (born 26 May 1994) is a Russian-Belarusian freestyle wrestler who competes in the Middleweight division of Real American Freestyle (RAF) as Kadik.

He is the 2020 Summer Olympics silver medallist in men's 74 kg, 2020 European Champion at 79kg and 2017 Russian National Champion at 70kg.

Kadzimahamedau was previously signed to the Featherweight division of Bellator MMA.

== Wrestling career ==
At the 2017 World Wrestling Championships, he placed seventh.

Kadzimahamedau received citizenship of Belarus in 2020.

In 2020, Kadzimahamedau won one of the bronze medals in the men's 79 kg event at the 2020 Individual Wrestling World Cup held in Belgrade, Serbia. In March 2021, he competed at the European Qualification Tournament in Budapest, Hungary hoping to qualify for the 2020 Summer Olympics in Tokyo, Japan. Though he didn't qualify, he subsequently entered and won at the 2021 World Wrestling Olympic Qualification Tournament, qualifying for the Tokyo Olympics. There he defeated two-time World and four-time NCAA champion American Kyle Dake in the quarterfinals en route to earning a silver medal for Belarus.

He competed at the 2024 European Wrestling Olympic Qualification Tournament in Baku, Azerbaijan and he earned a quota place for the Individual Neutral Athletes for the 2024 Summer Olympics in Paris, France. He competed in the men's freestyle 74 kg event at the Olympics.

=== Real American Freestyle ===
Kadzimahamedau debuted for the Cruiserweight division of Real American Freestyle with a victory over Dustin Plott at RAF 04 on December 20, 2025.

He challenged Kyle Dake for the RAF Cruiserweight Championship at RAF 05 on January 10, 2026, losing by decision.

In his Middleweight debut, Kadzimahamedau lost by technical fall to Evan Wick at RAF 06 on February 28, 2026. This fight earned him a Match of the Night award.

== Mixed martial arts career ==
In October 2022, a report surfaced about a Twitter video in which UFC then will-be Lightweight champion Islam Makhachev beat down Kadzimahamedau in a grapple exchange. Reactions added that Kadzimahamedau expressed, "All this training [was] just to get slept in 3 minutes." Makhachev was temporarily preparing to compete in UFC 280.

=== Bellator MMA ===
On 1 March 2023, it was announced that Kadzimahamedau had signed with Bellator MMA to start his MMA career.

== Championships and accomplishments ==
=== Freestyle wrestling ===
- Russian nationals 2017 – 1st at 70 kg.
- Ivan Yarygin GP 2017 – 3rd at 70 kg.
- Yasar Dogu International 2017 – 1st at 70 kg.
- Stepan Sarkisyan International 2017 – 1st at 70 kg.
- World Championships 2017 – 7th at 70 kg.
- Belarusian nationals 2020 – 1st at 79 kg.
- European champion 2020 – 1st at 79 kg.
- 2020 Olympic Games - 2nd at 74 kg.
- 2025 European Wrestling Championships - 2nd at 86 kg
- Real American Freestyle
  - Match of the Night (One time) vs. Evan Wick
