= RAF 05 =

2026 wrestling event

RAF 05: Covington vs. Rockhold
- The poster for RAF 05: Covington vs. Rockhold
- Promotion: Real American Freestyle
- Date: January 10, 2026
- Venue: Amerant Bank Arena
- City: Sunrise, Florida
- Attendance: 6,000+

Event chronology
RAF 04: Hendrickson vs. Parris	RAF 05: Covington vs. Rockhold	RAF 06: Cejudo vs. Faber

RAF 05: Covington vs. Rockhold was a freestyle wrestling event that took place on January 10, 2026 at the Amerant Bank Arena in Sunrise, Florida.

It was the fifth flagship event produced by the Real American Freestyle (RAF) promotion, and aired live on Fox Nation.

== Background ==
A cruiserweight bout between former interim UFC Welterweight Champion Colby Covington and former UFC Middleweight Champion Luke Rockhold headlined the event.

Tickets for the event went on sale through SeatGeek on December 5, 2025.

Commentary for the event's live Fox Nation broadcast was provided by Kurt Angle, Cyrus Fees, Julianna Peña, and Chael Sonnen.

RAF Cruiserweight Champion Kyle Dake defended his title at this event against Mahamedkhabib Kadzimahamedau. Kadzimahamedau had issued a challenge to Dake during the RAF 03 broadcast, leading to the bout. Dake previously lost to Kadzimahamedau in the quarterfinals of the 2020 Summer Olympics.

RAF Light Heavyweight Champion Bo Nickal was scheduled to defend his title against interim champion Yoel Romero at this event, but the bout was canceled after Romero missed weight and was stripped of his title. Romero won the interim title by defeating Pat Downey at RAF 04, a match made after Nickal withdrew from his scheduled title defense against Romero.

Jordan Oliver was scheduled to defend the RAF Featherweight Championship against Real Woods at this event in a rematch of their RAF 03 bout, but Oliver missed weight and was stripped of his title. The vacant title would have been awarded to Woods if he won the match, but since Oliver won it remained held up.

Austin DeSanto, Mostafa Elders, and Jordan Oliver won their matches despite being favored to lose by sportsbooks.

== Results ==
Main card (Fox Nation)
Weight class				Method	Round	Time	Notes
Cruiserweight	(United States) Colby Covington	def.	(United States) Luke Rockhold	Technical fall (12–0)	2	0:42
Cruiserweight	(United States) Kyle Dake (c)	def.	(Belarus) Mahamedkhabib Kadzimahamedau	Decision (10–7)	3	2:00	(Note: For the RAF Cruiserweight Championship.)
Catchweight (170 lb)	(Armenia) Arman Tsarukyan	def.	(United States) Lance Palmer	Technical fall (10–0)	1	1:35
Featherweight	(United States) Jordan Oliver	def.	(United States) Real Woods	Decision (criteria) (3–3)	3	2:00	(Note: For the vacant RAF Featherweight Championship (only Woods eligible).)
Heavyweight	(United States) Stephen Buchanan	def.	(Cuba) Yoel Romero	Technical fall (10–0)	2	1:11	(Note: Romero replaced Pat Downey.)
Cruiserweight	(United States) Zahid Valencia	def.	(United States) Nate Jackson	Decision (4–0)	3	2:00
Bantamweight	(United States) Austin DeSanto	def.	(United States) Nathan Tomasello (c)	Technical fall (11–1)	2	1:04	(Note: For the RAF Bantamweight Championship.)
Featherweight	(United States) Bo Bassett	def.	(United States) Cayden Henschell	Technical fall (14–4)	1	1:39
Heavyweight	(Egypt) Mostafa Elders	def.	(United States) Steve Mocco	Decision (6–1)	3	2:00
Featherweight	(United States) Patricio Lugo	def.	(United States) Johnni DiJulius	Technical fall (11–0)	2	1:30
Openweight	(United States) Georgio Poullas	def.	(United States) Keelon Jimison	Technical fall (11–1)	1	1:37

== Bonus awards ==
The following athletes received bonuses.

- Match of the Night: Kyle Dake vs. Mahamedkhabib Kadzimahamedau

== See also ==
- List of RAF events
