= Kennedy Blades =

American freestyle wrestler (born 2003)

- Blades at the 2025 Zagreb Open

Personal information
- Full name: Kennedy Alexis Blades
- Born: September 4, 2003 (age 23) Chicago, Illinois, U.S.
- Education: University of Iowa
- Height: 5 ft 11 in (180 cm)
- Weight: 76 kg (168 lb)

Sport
- Country: United States
- Sport: Wrestling
- Event: Freestyle
- Club: Sunkist Kids Wrestling Club
Medal record
Women's freestyle wrestling
Representing the United States
Olympic Games
| Silver medal – second place | 2024 Paris | 76 kg |
World Championships
| Bronze medal – third place | 2025 Zagreb | 68 kg |
| Bronze medal – third place | 2026 Astana | 68 kg |
Pan American Championships
| Gold medal – first place | 2025 Monterrey | 68 kg |
Grand Prix
| Gold medal – first place | 2023 Alexandria | 76 kg |
| Gold medal – first place | 2025 Zagreb | 68 kg |
| Gold medal – first place | 2025 Budapest | 68 kg |
| Bronze medal – third place | 2024 Zagreb | 76 kg |
World U23 Championships
| Silver medal – second place | 2023 Tirana | 76 kg |
World Junior Championships
| Gold medal – first place | 2021 Ufa | 72 kg |
| Bronze medal – third place | 2023 Amman | 76 kg |
Women's collegiate wrestling
Representing the Iowa Hawkeyes
NCAA Division I Championships
| Gold medal – first place | 2026 Coralville | 160 lb |

Kennedy Alexis Blades (born September 4, 2003) is an American wrestler. She currently competes in the middleweight division of Real American Freestyle (RAF), where she is the current RAF Women's Middleweight Champion.

She won the silver medal in the women's 76 kg event at the 2024 Summer Olympics in Paris, France. She also won a bronze medal in the women's 68 kg event at the 2025 World Championships.

== Biography ==
Blades is from Chicago, Illinois. She and her younger sister, Korina, started taking Brazilian jiu-jitsu classes when she was four years old. She later switched to wrestling at age seven, joining a small club in the area. As there were not many girls she could wrestle against, she often trained against boys. She won several championships competing against boys as a youth wrestler, including becoming the first female to win the IKWF Illinois state title, in 2016.

Blades and her sister, also a wrestler, attended Wyoming Seminary in Pennsylvania, the first American high school to have a girls wrestling program. She said that "because there weren't any women's high school wrestling teams in the nation, we had to travel around the world to get competition" – while in high school, she competed against wrestlers from countries including Japan, Russia, Estonia, Austria and Sweden. Blades won the U.S. Cadet national championship in 2018, and the U16 national championship, U17 national championship, and Junior national championship in 2019.

At age 17, Blades finished runner-up at the U.S. trials for the 2020 Summer Olympics, losing to Adeline Gray, who went on to win the Olympic silver medal. After she graduated from high school, she joined the wrestling club Sunkist Kids in Arizona and enrolled at Arizona State University. Blades was the gold medalist at the 2021 U20 world championship and later won silver at the 2023 U23 world championship. She also won gold at the 2023 Ibrahim Moustafa Tournament. In 2024, she defeated 2020 Olympic silver medalist Adeline Gray at the U.S. Olympic trials, thus qualifying for the 2024 Summer Olympics where she won the silver medal. Blades won the silver medal at the 2024 Summer Olympics, in the women's 76 kg weight class, which was the United States's 1,000th silver medal. She transferred to the University of Iowa in July 2025.

Blades announced in June 2026 that she was leaving Iowa early to commit to Real American Freestyle full-time and prepare for the 2028 Summer Olympics.

== Championships and accomplishments ==
=== Freestyle wrestling ===
- NCAA
  - 2026 NCAA Women's Wrestling Champion - 160 lbs.
- Real American Freestyle
  - RAF Women's Middleweight Champion (One time, current)
    - Four successful title defenses
- USA Wrestling
  - 2025 Anthony-Maroulis Trophy

== Freestyle record ==
RAF freestyle wrestling matches
| Res. | Record | Opponent | Method | Round | Time | Date | Event | Location |
|---|---|---|---|---|---|---|---|---|
| Win | 3-0 | (Russia) Milana Dudieva | Technical fall (11–0) | 2 | 0:14 | March 28, 2026 | RAF 07 | (United States) Tampa, Florida |
| Win | 2-0 | (United States) Alara Boyd | Technical fall (10–0) | 1 | 1:39 | December 20, 2025 | RAF 04 | (United States) Cleveland, Ohio |
Real American Freestyle 150 lb (Won inaugural RAF Women's Middleweight Championship)
| Win | 1-0 | (Mexico) Alejandra Rivera | Technical fall (11–0) | 2 | 1:18 | November 29, 2025 | RAF 03 | (United States) Chicago, Illinois |

Achievements
| New championship | 1st RAF Women's Middleweight Champion; November 29, 2025 – present | Incumbent |
