= Operation Active Fence =

NATO operation in Turkey (2012-present)

- Part of Syrian Civil War
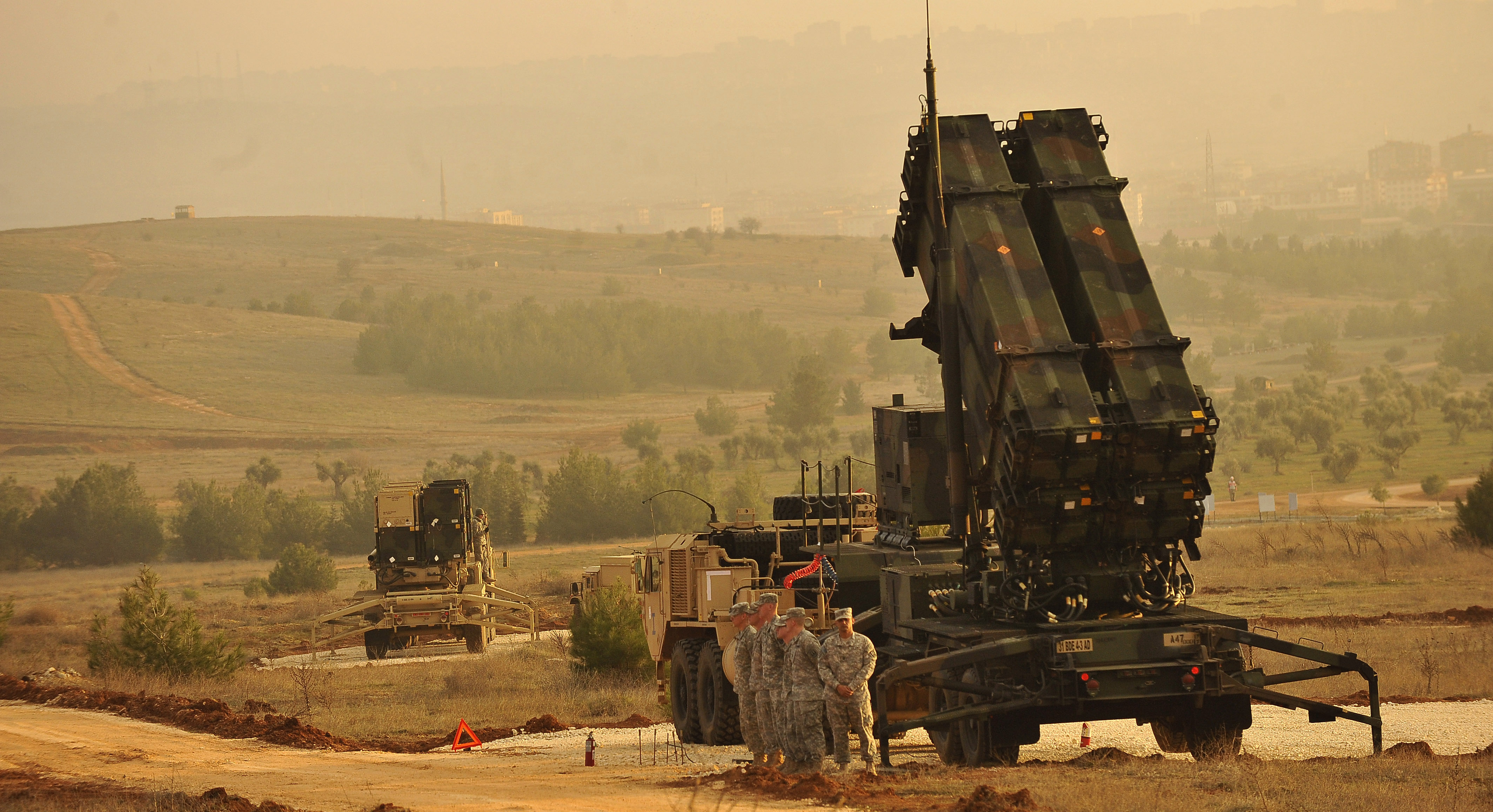
- NATO Operation Active Fence: U.S. and NATO Patriot missile batteries
Date	4 December 2012 – present (13 years, 9 months, 2 weeks and 4 days)
Location	Southeastern Turkish border region with Syria
Result	Ongoing NATO operation; To protect southern Turkey from possible missile and chemical attacks from Syria

Belligerents
NATO-led coalition: Czech Republic (September 2014–January 2015); Germany (Until January 2016); Italy (since 2016); Netherlands (until October 2015); Spain (since January 2015); Turkey; United States (until January 2016)	Syria (Until 2024); Russia (Since 2015); Iran ISIS

Commanders and leaders
(Spain) (Operational Commander) (Czech Republic) 1st Lt. Michaela Curikova (Germany) (Netherlands) Col. Niels Vredegoor (Italy) Lt. Gen. Massimo SCALA (Turkey) (United States) Col. Michael Kloepper	(Syria) Unknown (Russia) (Iran) (Islamic State)

Strength
(Germany) 2 Patriot Batteries (Germany) 400 soldiers (Italy) 1 SAMP-T Battery (Italy) 4th Anti-aircraft Artillery Regiment "Peschiera" (Italy) 130 soldiers (Netherlands) 2 Patriot Batteries (Netherlands) 1751 soldiers (Spain) 1 Patriot Battery (Spain) 130 soldiers (United States) 2 Patriot Batteries (United States) 52nd Air Defense Artillery Brigade (United States) 173rd Airborne Brigade	(Syria) Scud Missile Batteries

Casualties and losses
None	None

Operation Active Fence is an ongoing NATO operation to protect the Turkish southern border region with Syria as part of the Syrian Civil War.

== Background and initial operation ==
NATO insignia for operation Active Fence

The Arab Spring was a wave of uprisings and protests in North Africa and the Middle East. The first disturbances were in December 2010 in Tunisia. However, in March 2011, when the Arab Spring reached Syria, the Syrian Civil war broke out. By December of 2011 this led to some of the first hostilities between Syrian government and rebel forces along the Turkish border, and the start of a series of long, protracted border clashes with Syria since then.

By June 2012 this escalated to some of the first Turkish casualties of the conflict when one of its airplanes was shot down, and the Turkish government, as a member of NATO, invoked Article 4. This escalated further, and by October of the same year Syrian forces began shelling Turkish cities. Turkish officials considered activating Article 5 over these attacks, but instead attempted to de-escalate the situation, instead calling for another Article 4 convention, and asked the alliance for help to protect its airspace from possible missile attacks from Syria (which quickly evolved into protection from possible chemical attacks as well), to avoid a possible wider war. This mission request and scope followed previous precedence with Operation Display Deterrence, and was accepted. Patriot missile batteries were deployed from NATO allies to Turkey.

Operation Active Fence Assets

== Russian entry into Syria and Suruç bombing ==
In the beginning of 2015, Dutch and German forces were planning to leave the region and be replaced by Italian and Spanish forces as it looked like the operation would wind down. However, despite earlier assurances by Russian Foreign Minister Sergey Lavrov, by the end of 2015, Russia began backing Syrian forces; and together with the occurrence of the 2015 Suruç bombing, which it attributed to ISIS as part of the wider Turkish-ISIS conflict, Turkey re-invoked Article 4. In response, an emergency meeting was called, and NATO extended the operation.

Up until at least 2018, Patriot missiles were deployed solely to protect Turkish territory against any possible missile attacks from Syria. They were not used to support any no-fly zone, and were not used for any offensive action. There were several identified launches of rockets from within Syrian territory, but none of the missiles were aimed at Turkey or entered Turkish airspace to date, and the 173rd Airborne Brigade paratroopers secured NATO missile-defense sites.

== Balyun airstrikes ==
In 2019, again NATO members looked to wind down operations, as Italian SAMP/T batteries left the region, and Spain discussed removing Patriot batteries from Incirlik. However, by 2020, the situation again suddenly deteriorated further, involving Syrian and suspected Russian airstrikes on Turkish troops in Syria during the Northwestern Syrian Offensive already after a Russo-Turkish ceasefire failed to materialize. The Turkish government retaliated with Operation Spring Shield, threatening a direct war between Turkey and Russia. This rapid turn of events led to another Article 4 meeting and further NATO support and expansion of the operation. Due to this, a direct meeting was held between Erdogan and Putin, a no-fly zone was established in the Idlib province, and Russian and Turkish forces entered into joint patrols, as part of an agreement to help de-escalate the situation.

== See also ==
- 2012 Turkish F-4 Phantom shootdown
- 2015 NATO emergency meeting
- 2015 Suruç bombing
- 2019 Turkish offensive into north-eastern Syria
- 2020 Balyun airstrikes
- Ghouta chemical attack
- Islamic State-related terrorist attacks in Turkey
- Northwestern Syria offensive (December 2019–March 2020)
- Operation Display Deterrence
- Operation Olive Branch
- Operation Euphrates Shield
- Syrian–Turkish border clashes during the Syrian civil war
