= Operation Display Deterrence =

NATO operation in Turkey (2003)

- Part of Iraq War
- NATO Operation Display Deterrence: Turkish soldier guarding Dutch AWAC
Date	26 February - 3 May 2003
Location	Turkish border with Iraq
Result	NATO operation; To protect Turkish-Iraq border

Belligerents
NATO-led coalition	Iraq

Commanders and leaders
(United States) General James L. Jones (Turkey) General Oktar Ataman	(Iraq) Unknown

Strength
(United States) 2 Patriot missile batteries (Netherlands) 371 personnel, 3 Patriot missile batteries, 4 AWACSs (Airborne Warning And Control Systems) (Norway) 4 officers (Poland) 50 chemical/biological specialists (Turkey) 40 fighter aircraft, 2 tankers	(Iraq) Unknown

Casualties and losses
None	None

Operation Display Deterrence was a 65-day NATO operation to protect the Turkish border region with Iraq, made in response to an Article 4 declaration by the Turkish government in response to the Iraq War.

== Objectives and operational activity ==
It was aimed at defending Turkey from a threat from Iraq and deterring aggression. NATO's military deployment consisted of AWACS surveillance aircraft and crews, TMD units, and biological and chemical defence equipment. Command was set up in Eskişehir. NATO assets were sent to the Konya air base in Turkey, along with Patriot missile systems installed in Diyarbakir and Batman to help guard their airspace during military operations of the Iraq War.

== Operation Active Fence ==
Similar assets, deployment, and lessons from this operation were carried forward to Operation Active Fence in 2012.
