= January 2014 Turkish attack in Syria =

Contradicting reports mention either a Turkish airstrike or an attack with Turkish ground artillery, on ISIL targets in northern Syria on Tuesday, 28 January 2014.

== Alleged cause and alleged airstrike ==
After ISIL purportedly had fired on the Turkish Army along the Syrian border or had attacked the Turkish border, and had purportedly raided ethnic Turkish communities in northern Syria, and had purportedly threatened to attack Turkey, Turkish fighter-jets in retaliation on 28 January 2014 attacked and destroyed from an ISIL convoy in northern Syria a pickup, a truck and a bus, according to the Turkish General Staff. According to local sources, 11 ISIL fighters and 1 ISIL emir, Abu Ja’fr Dagestani, were killed in the attack.

== Contradicting reports ==
Contradicting earlier media reports however had said it was not a Turkish airstrike but fire from Turkish tanks and artillery, and that it wasn't retaliating for an attack on Turkey but for mortar shells fired in Syria during a clash between ISIL and the Free Syrian Army which accidentally had landed in Turkey.

== See also ==
- Syrian–Turkish border incidents during the Syrian Civil War
