= 2015 NATO emergency meeting =

NATO meeting held in Brussels, Belgium

- Date: July 28, 2015
- Location: (Belgium) Brussels
- Type: Emergency convention
- Cause: Turkey–ISIL conflict
- Organised by: (NATO) North Atlantic Treaty Organization

The 2015 NATO emergency meeting was an emergency convention of the North Atlantic Treaty Organization called by Turkey, in accordance to Article 4 of NATO's founding treaty. It is the fifth such meeting called in the organisation's 66-year history. The meeting was held in Brussels, Belgium on 28 July 2015 and was attended by ambassadors of all NATO's member states.

The meeting was called after developments on the Syria–Turkey border resulted in an escalation of violence by the Islamic State of Iraq and the Levant (ISIL) and the Kurdistan Workers' Party (PKK), resulting in Turkey launching airstrikes and domestic police raids against suspected militants. The dissolution of the three-year solution process between the Turkish government and the PKK, as well as a suicide bombing in Suruç initiated by ISIL, were considered to be the main reasons behind the escalation of violence.

== Background ==
Despite a series of terrorist attacks in 2013 and 2015 that were associated with the Islamic State of Iraq and the Levant (ISIL), Turkey had until recently followed a policy of relative inaction against the group. The government's policy of inaction was criticised both home and abroad, with relations with NATO becoming strained partly due to Turkey's refusal to allow the United States to use the highly strategic İncirlik Air Base in Adana Province to fight against ISIL.

Since late 2012, the Turkish government has pursued a solution process with the Kurdistan Workers' Party (PKK), with which the Turkish Armed Forces have been in conflict with for over 40 years. The solution process resulted in relative peace and stability in the predominantly Kurdish south-east of Turkey, though violations of the ceasefire occurred on numerous occasions.

=== Turkish–NATO relations ===
Turkey has usually been regarded to be at odds with NATO's policy on ISIL, having been criticised by many of the organisation's members for not doing more to tackle ISIL. However, NATO has responded to Turkish requests to maintain security on the Syria–Turkey border, deploying MIM-104 Patriot missiles on the border in 2013, along with other assets since the beginning of Operation Active Fence in 2012.

=== Suruç bombing and the Elbeyli Incident ===
On 20 July 2015, a suicide bombing in the Turkish border town of Suruç, Şanlıurfa Province, led to the death of 32 youth activists who had been preparing to cross the border into the Syrian town of Kobanî, which had until recently been under siege by ISIL. The attack was allegedly perpetrated by an ISIL-linked group named the Dokumacılar, with ISIL claiming responsibility soon after the attack. In response, PKK militants killed two Turkish police officers in the district of Ceylanpınar in retaliation for what they saw as collaboration between ISIL and the governing Turkish Justice and Development Party (AKP). On July 23, five ISIL militants attacked Turkish military positions in the Turkish border town of Elbeyli, Kilis Province, killing one soldier and injuring two others.

=== Operation Martyr Yalçın ===
The increase in terrorism incidents attributed to both the PKK and ISIL in recent days resulted in Prime Minister Ahmet Davutoğlu launching airstrikes against ISIL positions in Syria and PKK positions in northern Iraq. Following a prolonged period of inaction against ISIL, the airstrikes received support from NATO members, though many stressed that the solution process with the PKK should be maintained. President Recep Tayyip Erdoğan also announced that the US Air Force would be allowed to use İncirlik Air Base to attack ISIL and maintain a no-fly zone around the border.

At the same time, large-scale domestic police operations against alleged members of ISIL, the PKK and other terrorist groups were conducted nationwide, resulting in the arrests of nearly 600 people in over 22 Provinces of Turkey.

== Emergency meeting ==
=== Request by Ankara ===
On July 26, the Turkish government requested the closed-door meeting in accordance to Article 4 of NATO's founding treaty, which states that countries can request consultations if they believe that their territorial integrity, political independence or security is at risk. Such a meeting is the fifth in NATO's 66-year history, with Turkey having called two in 2003 and 2013. NATO's Secretary General Jens Stoltenberg announced that the meeting would be held in Brussels on 28 July 2015.

=== Outcome ===
Although no request for military support had been made, Turkish Foreign Minister Mevlüt Çavuşoğlu stated that he hoped for support and solidarity from Turkey's allies in their campaign against ISIL and the PKK. NATO Secretary General Jens Stoltenberg also warned that military support would not be unconditional. The United States and Turkey agreed to pursue a strategy of creating an ISIL-free zone in northern Syria, combined with a no-fly zone encompassing the entire Syrian–Turkish border. Regardless, NATO denounced the attack and reassessed NATO assets in Turkey as part of Operation Active Fence.
