= NATO =

Intergovernmental military alliance

North Atlantic Treaty Organization
- Organisation du traité de l'Atlantique nord
- Logo

- Flag

- Member states shown in dark green
- Abbreviation: NATO; OTAN
- Formation: 4 April 1949 (77 years ago)
- Type: Military alliance
- Headquarters: Brussels, Belgium
- Members: 32 states: Albania; Belgium; Bulgaria; Canada; Croatia; Czech Republic; Denmark; Estonia; Finland; France; Germany; Greece; Hungary; Iceland; Italy; Latvia; Lithuania; Luxembourg; Montenegro; Netherlands; North Macedonia; Norway; Poland; Portugal; Romania; Slovakia; Slovenia; Spain; Sweden; Turkey; United Kingdom; United States
- Official languages: English; French
- Secretary General: Mark Rutte
- Chair of the NATO Military Committee: Giuseppe Cavo Dragone
- Supreme Allied Commander Europe: Alexus Grynkewich
- Supreme Allied Commander Transformation: Pierre Vandier
- Expenses: Total: US$1.588 trillion Excluding the US: US$608 billion (2025 estimate)
- Website: nato.int

The North Atlantic Treaty Organization (NATO) (Note: /ˈneɪtoʊ/, NAY-toh. Also called the "North Atlantic Alliance". French: Organisation du traité de l'Atlantique Nord (OTAN).) is an intergovernmental military alliance between 32 member states (thirty in Europe and two in North America). Founded in the aftermath of World War II, NATO was established with the signing of the North Atlantic Treaty in 1949. The organization serves as a system of collective security and deterrence, whereby its independent members agree to defend each-other from attack by any outside party. This is enshrined in Article 5 of the treaty, which states that an armed attack against the territory of one member shall be considered an attack against them all.

Throughout the Cold War, NATO's primary purpose was to deter and counter the threat posed by the Soviet Union and its satellite states, which formed the rival Warsaw Pact in 1955. Following the dissolution of the Soviet Union in 1991, the alliance adapted. NATO undertook its first military intervention in the Bosnian War (1992–1995); with a United Nations mandate, it enforced a no-fly zone and defended UN safe zones. NATO also intervened in the Kosovo War in 1999 by bombing Yugoslavia with the stated goal of ending the violence and repressive actions by the Milošević government. Article 5 was invoked for the first and only time by the United States after the September 11 attacks, leading to NATO involvement in the war in Afghanistan (2001–2014), as part of the International Security Assistance Force (ISAF). In 2011, NATO intervened in the Libyan civil war, with a UN mandate to enforce a no-fly zone and protect civilians. The alliance has since been involved in training Iraq's military and countering piracy.

Since the end of the Cold War, the alliance has accepted sixteen new members in Europe. NATO recognizes Bosnia and Herzegovina, Ukraine and Georgia as aspiring members. NATO has bordered the Russian Federation since 1991. Russia–NATO relations had been co-operative, but became adversarial during Vladimir Putin's second presidency. Putin called NATO's eastward enlargement a threat, and opposes Ukraine joining the alliance. Following the Russian annexation of Crimea in 2014, NATO suspended co-operation and deployed a tripwire force in the east for the first time. The 2022 Russian invasion of Ukraine prompted NATO to reinforce its eastern flank and send military aid to Ukraine. The invasion caused Finland and Sweden to join the alliance. Since the invasion, Russia has been accused of waging a hybrid conflict against NATO. Between 2025 and 2026, there was an internal crisis in NATO due to threats made by the US, a major contributing member, against the sovereignty of fellow members Canada and Denmark.

NATO members contribute to collective defense in two ways: by funding their own defense, and by helping to fund a shared budget for running the organization as a whole and maintaining joint facilities. Each member has committed to a target of spending at least 5% of their gross domestic product (GDP) on their own defense and security by 2035, while in 2026 the shared budget was around €5 billion split between all 32 members. As of 2026, the US spends the most overall on its defense, Norway spends the most per capita, while Poland and the Baltic states spend the most as a share of GDP. The combined military spending of NATO members makes up over half of the world total. The combined militaries of all NATO members include about 3.5 million soldiers and personnel. NATO's main headquarters are in Brussels, Belgium, while its military headquarters are near Mons, Belgium.

== History ==
=== 20th century ===
NATO has its roots in the Atlantic Charter, a 1941 agreement between the United States and United Kingdom. The Charter laid out a framework for international cooperation without territorial expansion after World War II. On 4 March 1947, the Treaty of Dunkirk was signed by France and the UK during the aftermath of World War II and the start of the Cold War as a Treaty of Alliance and Mutual Assistance in the event of possible attacks by Germany. In March 1948, this alliance was expanded in the Treaty of Brussels to include the Benelux countries, forming the Brussels Treaty Organization, commonly known as the Western Union. Talks for a wider military alliance, which could include North America, also began that month in the US, where their foreign policy under the Truman Doctrine set out in 1947 promoted international solidarity against actions they saw as communist aggression, such as the February 1948 coup d'état in Czechoslovakia. These talks resulted in the signature of the North Atlantic Treaty on 4 April 1949 by the member states of the Western Union and the US, Canada, Portugal, Italy, Norway, Denmark, and Iceland. Canadian diplomat Lester B. Pearson was a key author and drafter of the treaty.

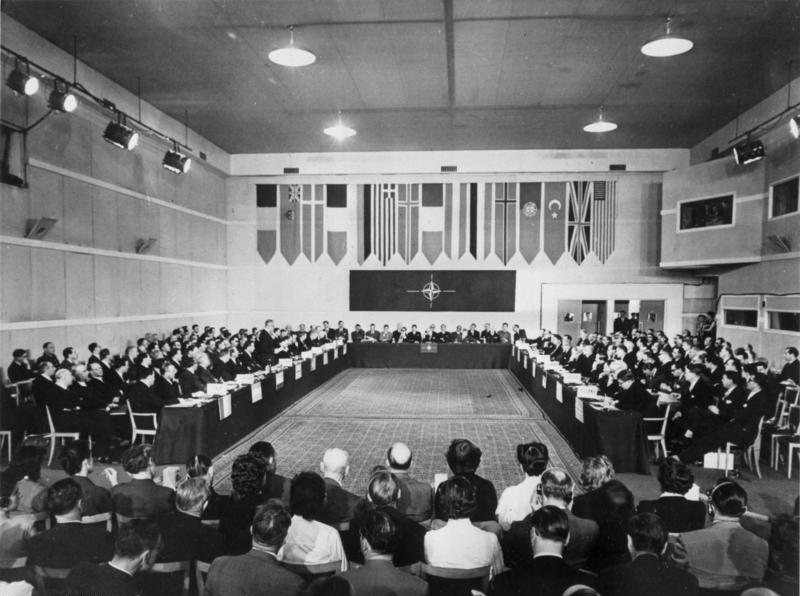
West Germany joined NATO in 1955, which led to the formation of the rival Warsaw Pact during the Cold War.

The North Atlantic Treaty was largely dormant until the Korean War initiated the establishment of NATO to implement it with an integrated military structure. This included the formation of Supreme Headquarters Allied Powers Europe (SHAPE) in 1951, which adopted many of the Western Union's military structures and plans, including their agreements on standardizing equipment and agreements on stationing foreign military forces in European countries. In 1952, the post of Secretary General of NATO was established as the organization's chief civilian. That year also saw the first major NATO maritime exercises, Exercise Mainbrace and the accession of Greece and Turkey to the organization. Following the London and Paris Conferences, West Germany was permitted to rearm militarily, as they joined NATO in May 1955, which was, in turn, a major factor in the creation of the Soviet-dominated Warsaw Pact, delineating the two opposing sides of the Cold War.

The building of the Berlin Wall in 1961 marked a height in Cold War tensions, when 400,000 US troops were stationed in Europe. Doubts over the strength of the relationship between the European states and the US ebbed and flowed, along with doubts over the credibility of the NATO defence against a prospective Soviet invasion – doubts that led to the development of the independent French nuclear deterrent and the withdrawal of France from NATO's military structure in 1966. In 1982, the newly democratic Spain joined the alliance.

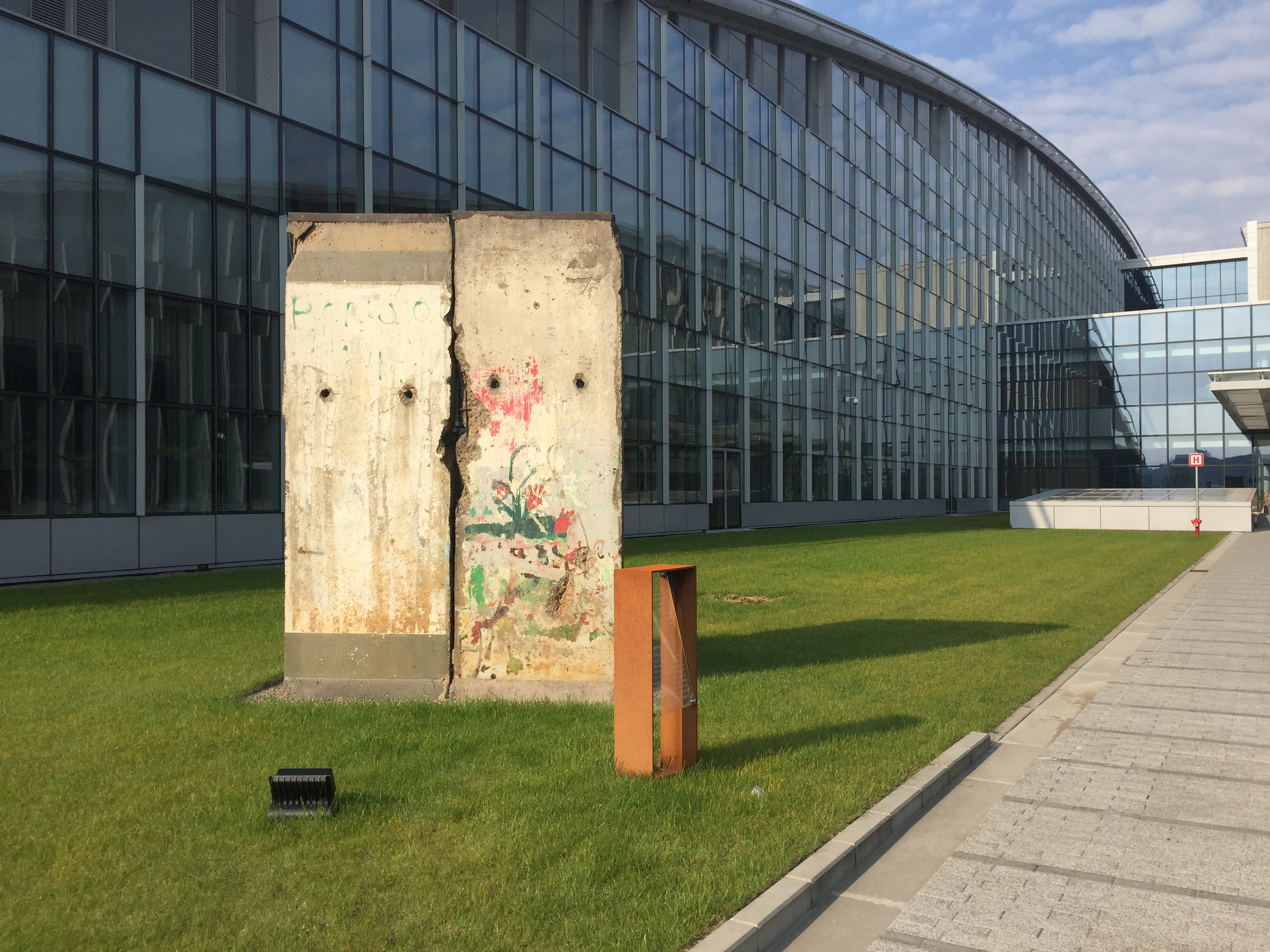
The Fall of the Berlin Wall in 1989 marked a turning point in NATO's role in Europe, and a section of that wall is displayed outside NATO headquarters.

The Revolutions of 1989 in Europe led to a strategic reevaluation of NATO's purpose, nature, tasks, and focus on the continent. In October 1990, East Germany became part of the Federal Republic of Germany and the alliance, and in November 1990, the alliance signed the Treaty on Conventional Armed Forces in Europe (CFE) in Paris with the Soviet Union. It mandated specific military reductions across the continent, which continued after the collapse of the Warsaw Pact in February 1991 and the dissolution of the Soviet Union that December, which removed the de facto main adversaries of NATO. This began a drawdown of military spending and equipment in Europe. The CFE treaty allowed signatories to remove 52,000 pieces of conventional armaments in the following sixteen years, and allowed military spending by NATO's European members to decline by 28 percent from 1990 to 2015. In 1990, several Western leaders gave assurances to Mikhail Gorbachev that NATO would not expand further east, as revealed by memoranda of private conversations. In a later interview, Gorbachev stated that an expansion of NATO was not discussed at the time, and that talks were about stationing NATO troops in former East Germany.

In the 1990s, the organization extended its activities into political and humanitarian situations that had not formerly been NATO concerns. During the breakup of Yugoslavia, the organization conducted its first military interventions in Bosnia from 1992 to 1995 and later Yugoslavia in 1999.

Politically, the organization sought better relations with the newly autonomous Central and Eastern European states, and diplomatic forums for regional cooperation between NATO and its neighbors were set up during this post-Cold War period, including the Partnership for Peace and the Mediterranean Dialogue initiative in 1994, the Euro-Atlantic Partnership Council in 1997, and the NATO–Russia Permanent Joint Council in 1998. At the 1999 Washington summit, Hungary, Poland, and the Czech Republic officially joined NATO, and the organization also issued new guidelines for membership with individualized "Membership Action Plans". These plans governed the subsequent addition of new alliance members.

=== 21st century ===
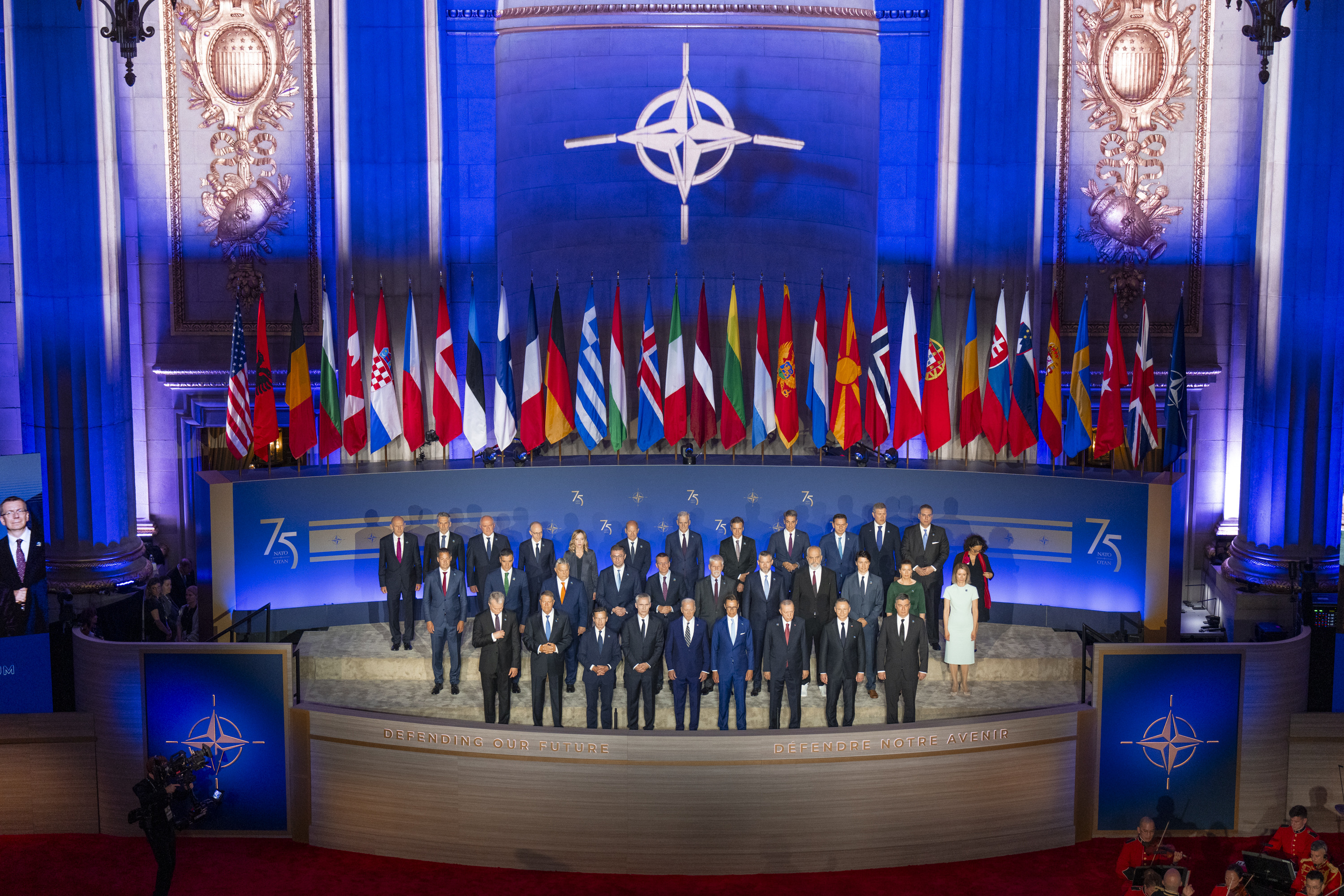
Group photo at 75th anniversary summit in Washington D.C., 2024

Article 5 of the North Atlantic treaty, requiring member states to come to the aid of any member state subject to an armed attack, was invoked for the only time after the September 11 attacks, after which troops were deployed to Afghanistan under the NATO-led ISAF. The organization has operated a range of additional roles since then, including sending trainers to Iraq, assisting in counter-piracy operations.

The election of French president Nicolas Sarkozy in 2007 led to a major reform of France's military position, culminating with the return to full membership on 4 April 2009, which also included France rejoining the NATO Military Command Structure, while maintaining an independent nuclear deterrent.

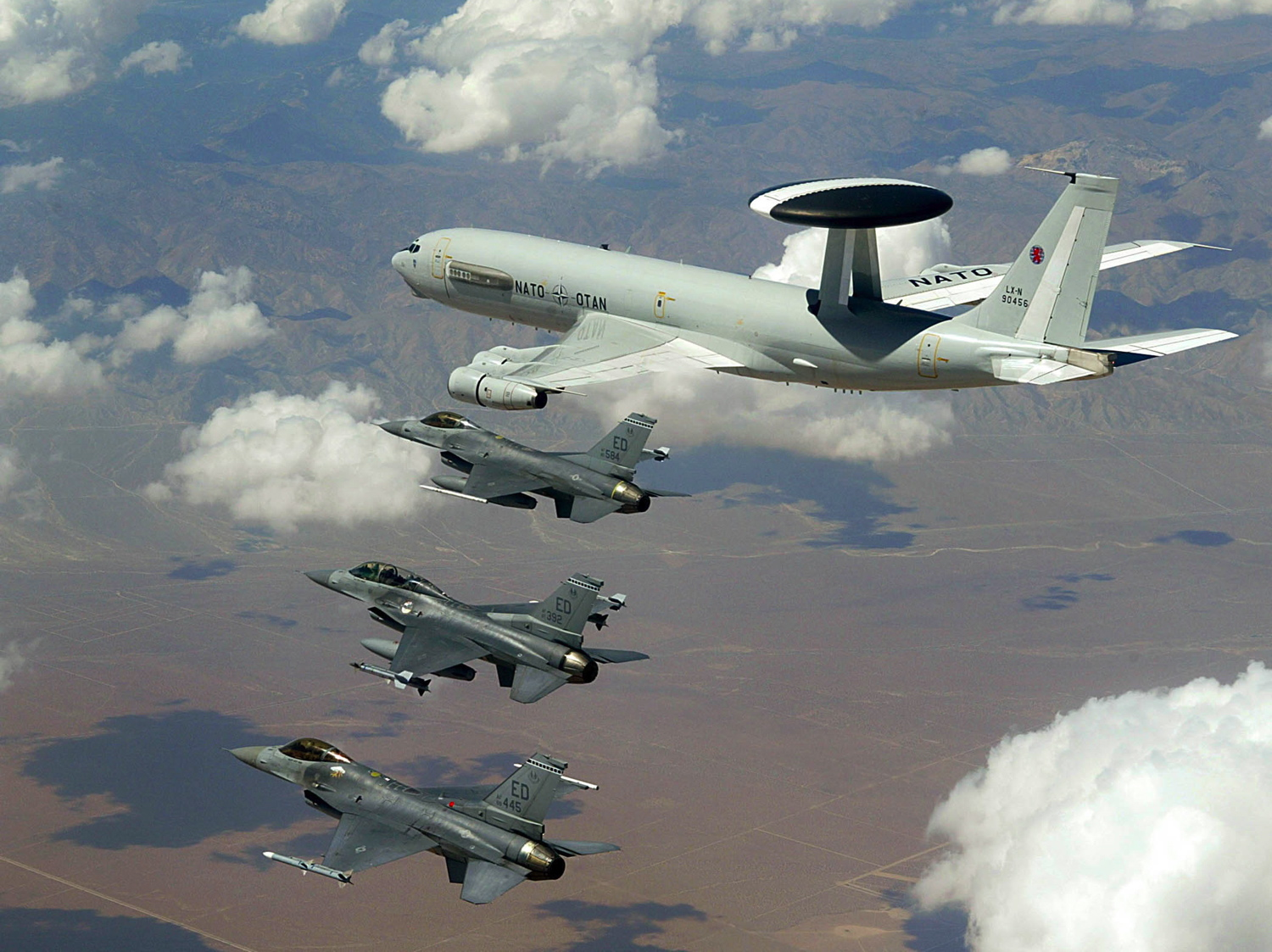
NATO E-3A flying with US Air Force F-16s in a NATO exercise

The 2014 Russian annexation of Crimea led to strong condemnation by all NATO members, and was one of the seven times that Article 4, which calls for consultation among NATO members, has been invoked. Prior times included during the Iraq War and Syrian civil war. At the 2014 Wales summit, the leaders of NATO's member states formally committed for the first time to spend the equivalent of at least two percent of their gross domestic products on defence by 2024, which had previously been only an informal guideline.

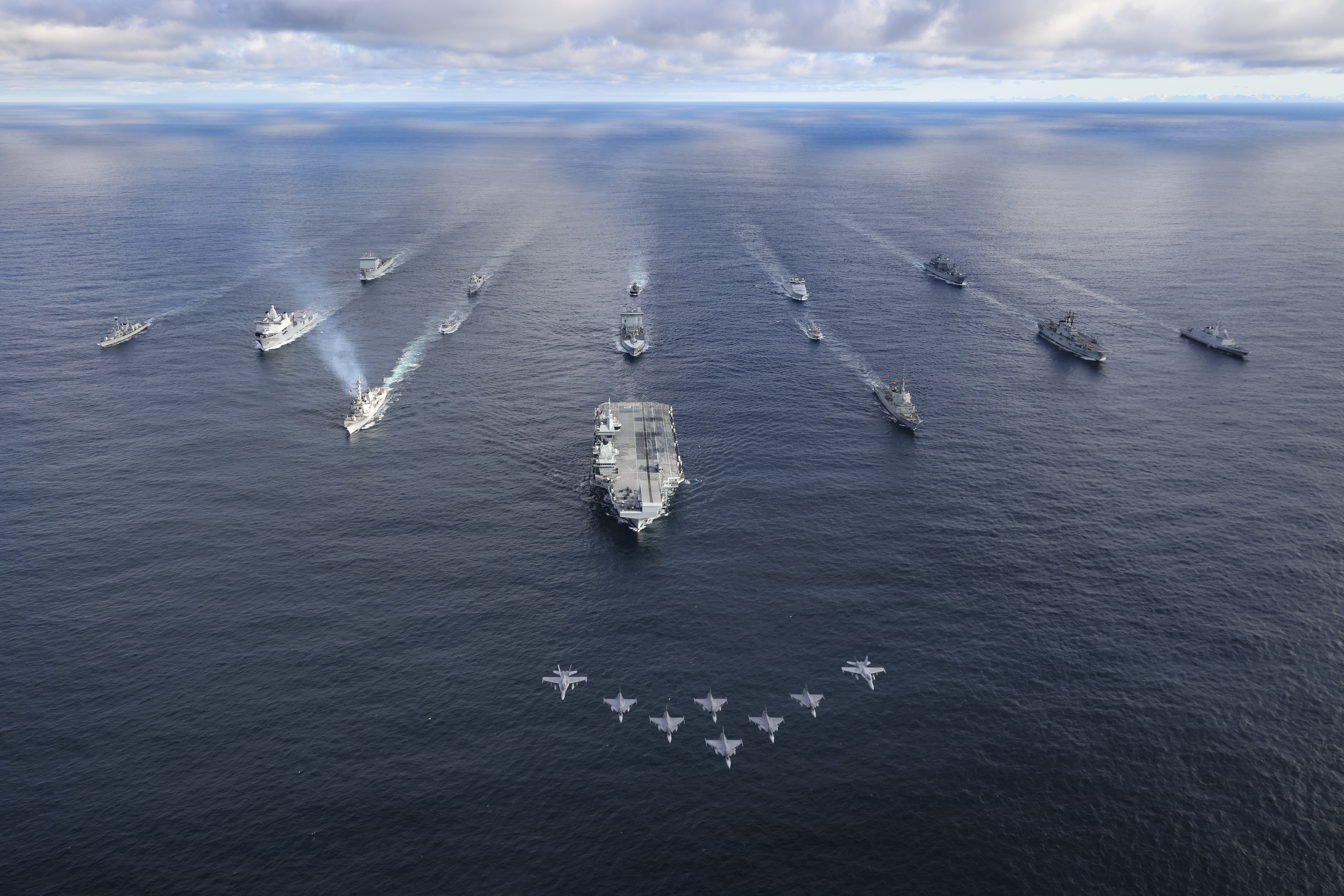
Steadfast Defender 24 was the largest NATO exercise since the end of the Cold War.

In response to Russia's 2014 invasion of Ukraine, at the 2016 Warsaw summit, NATO countries agreed on the creation of NATO Enhanced Forward Presence, which deployed four multinational battalion-sized battlegroups in Estonia, Latvia, Lithuania, and Poland. Before and during the Russo-Ukrainian war, several NATO countries sent ground troops, warships and fighter aircraft to reinforce the alliance's eastern flank, and multiple countries again invoked Article 4. In March 2022, NATO leaders met at Brussels for an extraordinary summit which also involved Group of Seven and European Union leaders. NATO member states agreed to establish four additional battlegroups in Bulgaria, Hungary, Romania, and Slovakia, and elements of the NATO Response Force were activated for the first time in NATO's history.

As of June 2022, NATO had deployed 40,000 troops along its 2,500-kilometre-long (1,550 mi) Eastern flank to deter Russian aggression. More than half of this number have been deployed in Bulgaria, Romania, Hungary, Slovakia, and Poland, which five countries muster a considerable combined ex-NATO force of 259,000 troops. To supplement Bulgaria's Air Force, Spain sent Eurofighter Typhoons, the Netherlands sent eight F-35 attack aircraft, and additional French and US attack aircraft would arrive soon as well. In 2025, Germany stationed a full armoured brigade in Lithuania.

Since US president Donald Trump's reelection in 2024, NATO faced an unprecedented rift between the US and the majority of other NATO members, as the administration repeatedly threatened the sovereignty of two founding members, Canada and Denmark, in its reiterating proposals of Canadian absorption to the US and in the Greenland crisis, respectively, and in wider deterioration of US–European Union and Canada–US relations. In March 2026, Trump called NATO allies cowards for refusing calls to help reopen the Strait of Hormuz during the 2026 Israeli–US strikes on Iran, describing the alliance as a "paper tiger" and ineffective without the US.

== Military operations ==
=== Early operations ===
No military operations were conducted by NATO during the Cold War. Following the end of the Cold War, the first operations, Anchor Guard in 1990 and Ace Guard in 1991, were prompted by the Iraqi invasion of Kuwait. Airborne early warning aircraft were sent to provide coverage of southeastern Turkey, and later a quick-reaction force was deployed to the area.

=== Bosnia and Herzegovina intervention ===
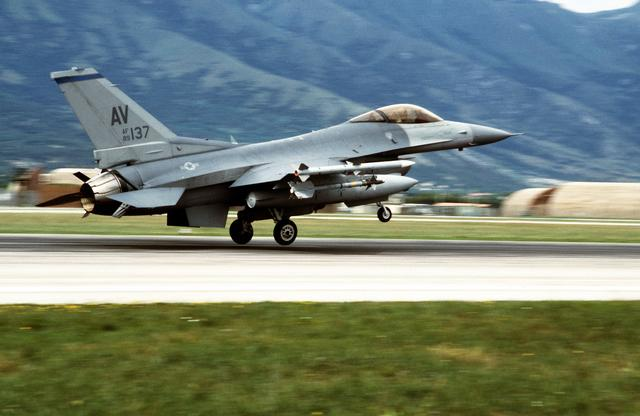
A USAF aircraft landing during Operation Deliberate Force after the Srebrenica massacre

The Bosnian War began in 1992, as a result of the breakup of Yugoslavia. The deteriorating situation led to United Nations Security Council Resolution 816 on 9 October 1992, authorizing its member-states to enforce a previously declared no-fly zone under the UN Protection Force over central Bosnia and Herzegovina. NATO complied and started enforcing the ban on 12 April 1993 with Operation Deny Flight. From June 1993 until October 1996, Operation Sharp Guard added maritime enforcement of the arms embargo and economic sanctions against the Federal Republic of Yugoslavia. On 28 February 1994, NATO took its first wartime action by shooting down four Bosnian Serb aircraft violating the no-fly zone.

On 10 and 11 April 1994, the UN Protection Force called in air strikes to protect the Goražde safe area, resulting in the bombing of a Bosnian Serb military command outpost near Goražde by two US F-16 jets acting under NATO direction. In retaliation, Serbs took 150 U.N. personnel hostage on 14 April. On 16 April a British Sea Harrier was shot down over Goražde by Serb forces.

In August 1995, a two-week NATO bombing campaign, Operation Deliberate Force, began against the Army of the Republika Srpska, after the Srebrenica genocide. Further NATO air strikes helped bring the Yugoslav Wars to an end, resulting in the Dayton Agreement in November 1995. As part of this agreement, NATO deployed a UN-mandated peacekeeping force, under Operation Joint Endeavor, named IFOR. Almost 60,000 NATO troops were joined by forces from non-NATO countries in this peacekeeping mission. This transitioned into the smaller SFOR, which started with 32,000 troops initially and ran from December 1996 until December 2004, when operations were then passed onto the European Union Force Althea. Following the lead of its member states, NATO began to award a service medal, the NATO Medal, for these operations.

=== Kosovo intervention ===
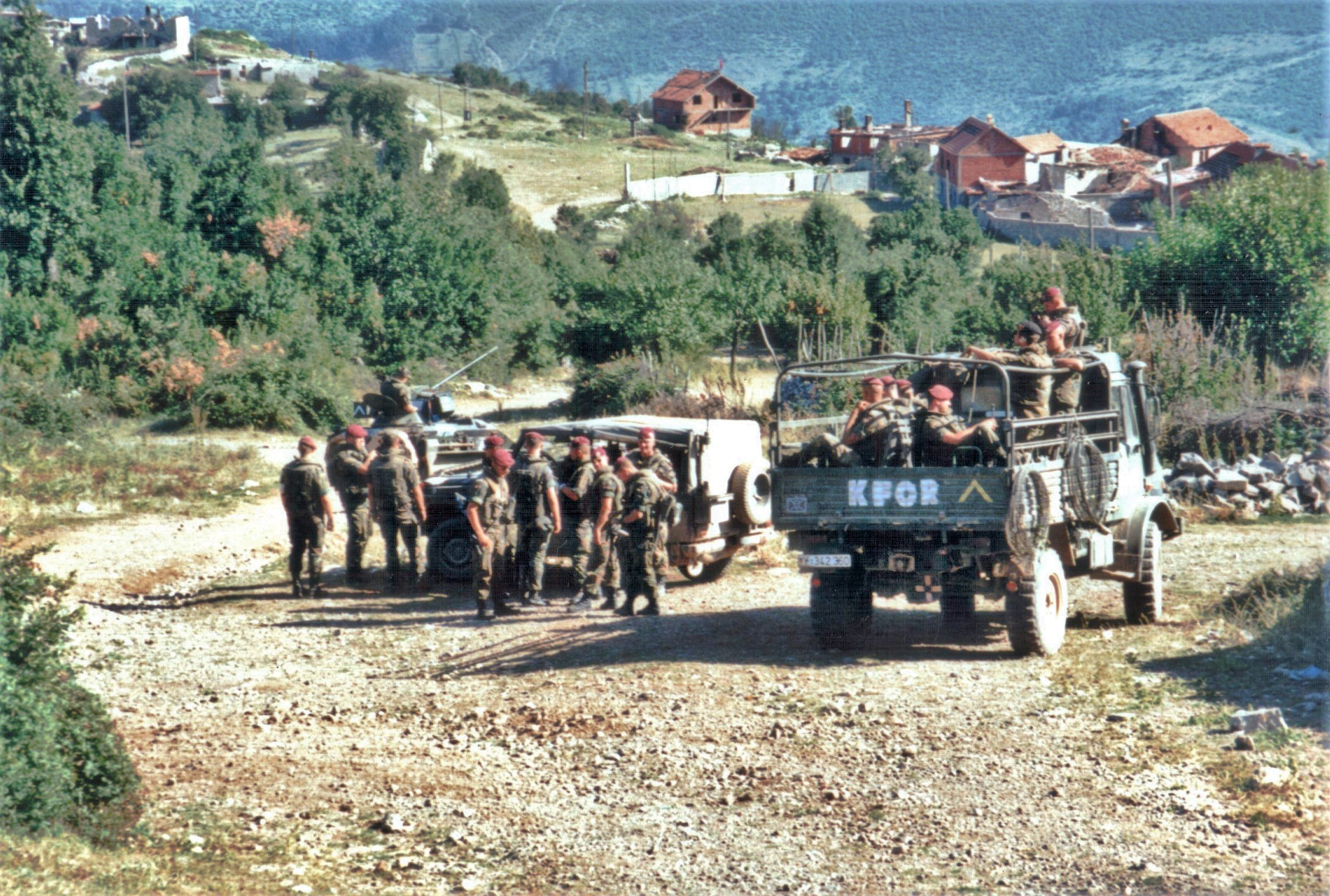
German KFOR soldiers on patrol in southern Kosovo in 1999

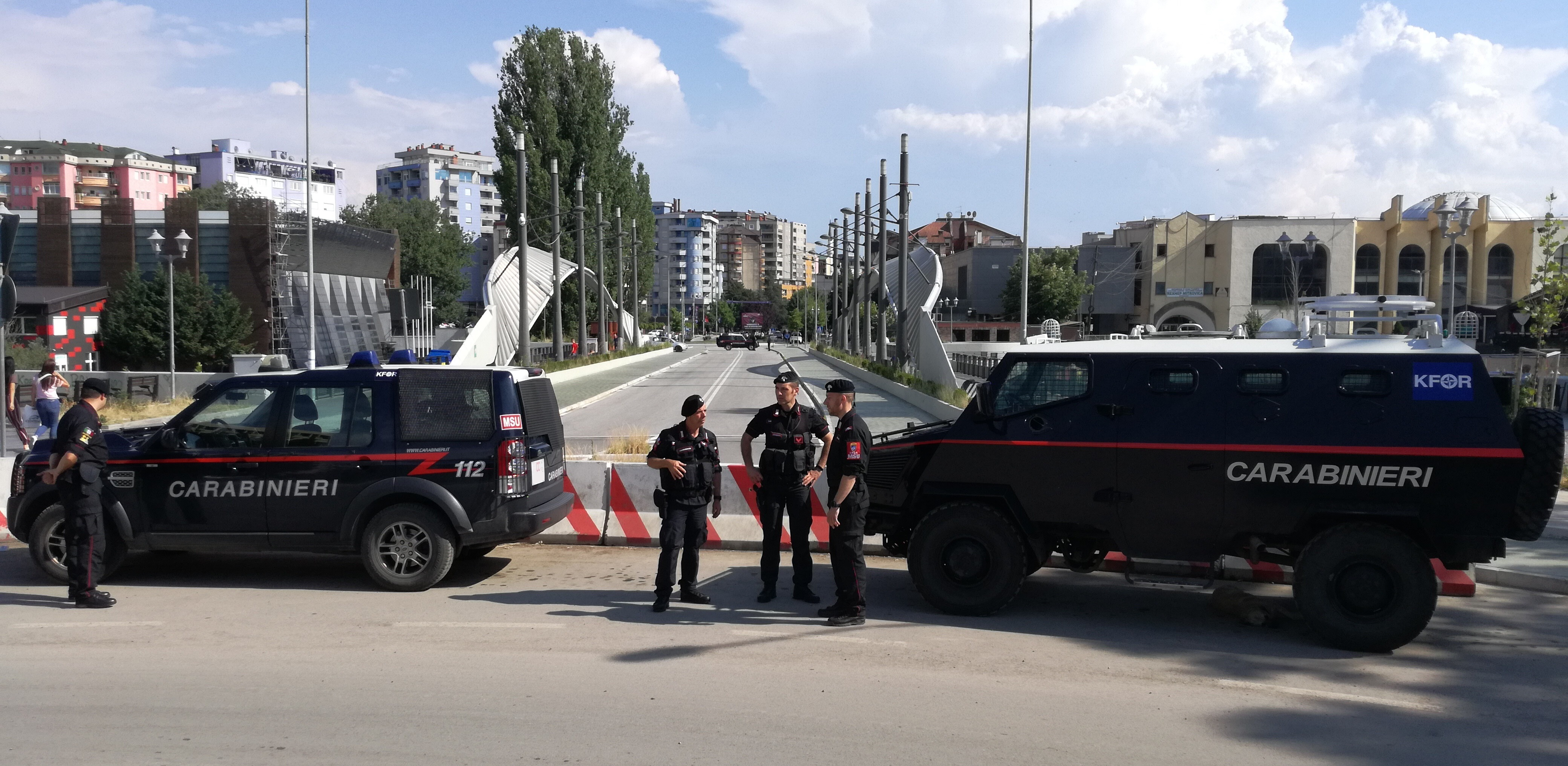
KFOR-MSU Carabinieri Patrols in front of the Ibar Bridge in Mitrovica, Kosovo, 2019

In an effort to stop Slobodan Milošević's Serbian-led crackdown on KLA separatists and Albanian civilians in Kosovo, the UN Security Council passed Resolution 1199 on 23 September 1998 to demand a ceasefire.

Negotiations under US Special Envoy Richard Holbrooke broke down on 23 March 1999, and he handed the matter to NATO, which acted on protecting regional security and started a 78-day bombing campaign on 24 March 1999. Operation Allied Force targeted the military capabilities of what was then the Federal Republic of Yugoslavia. During the crisis, NATO also deployed one of its international reaction forces, the ACE Mobile Force (Land), to Albania as the Albania Force (AFOR), to deliver humanitarian aid to refugees from Kosovo.

The campaign was and has been criticized over its civilian casualties, including the bombing of the Chinese embassy in Belgrade, and over whether it had legitimacy. The US, the UK, and most other NATO countries opposed efforts to require the UN Security Council to approve NATO military strikes, such as the action against Serbia in 1999, while France and some others claimed that the alliance needed UN approval. The US/UK side claimed that this would undermine the authority of the alliance, and they noted that Russia and China would have exercised their Security Council vetoes to block the strike on Yugoslavia, and could do the same in future conflicts where NATO intervention was required, thus nullifying the entire potency and purpose of the organization. Recognizing the post-Cold War military environment, NATO adopted the Alliance Strategic Concept during its Washington summit in April 1999 that emphasized conflict prevention and crisis management.

Milošević finally accepted the terms of an international peace plan on 3 June 1999, ending the Kosovo War. On 11 June, Milošević further accepted UN resolution 1244, under the mandate of which NATO then helped establish the KFOR peacekeeping force. Nearly one million refugees had fled Kosovo, and part of KFOR's mandate was to protect the humanitarian missions, in addition to deterring violence. In August–September 2001, the alliance also mounted Operation Essential Harvest, a mission disarming ethnic Albanian militias in the Republic of Macedonia. As of 2023, around 4,500 KFOR soldiers, representing 27 countries, continue to operate in the area.

=== War in Afghanistan ===
The September 11 attacks in the US caused NATO to invoke Article 5 of the NATO Charter for the first time in the organization's history. The Article states that an attack on any member shall be considered to be an attack on all. The invocation was confirmed on 4 October 2001 when NATO determined that the attacks were indeed eligible under the terms of the North Atlantic Treaty. The eight official actions taken by NATO in response to the attacks included Operation Eagle Assist and Operation Active Endeavour, a naval operation in the Mediterranean Sea designed to prevent the movement of terrorists or weapons of mass destruction, and to enhance the security of shipping in general, which began on 4 October 2001.

The alliance showed unity: on 16 April 2003, NATO agreed to take command of the International Security Assistance Force (ISAF), which included troops from 42 countries. The decision came at the request of Germany and the Netherlands, the two countries leading ISAF at the time of the agreement, and all nineteen NATO ambassadors approved it unanimously. The handover of control to NATO took place on 11 August, and marked the first time in NATO's history that it took charge of a mission outside the north Atlantic area.

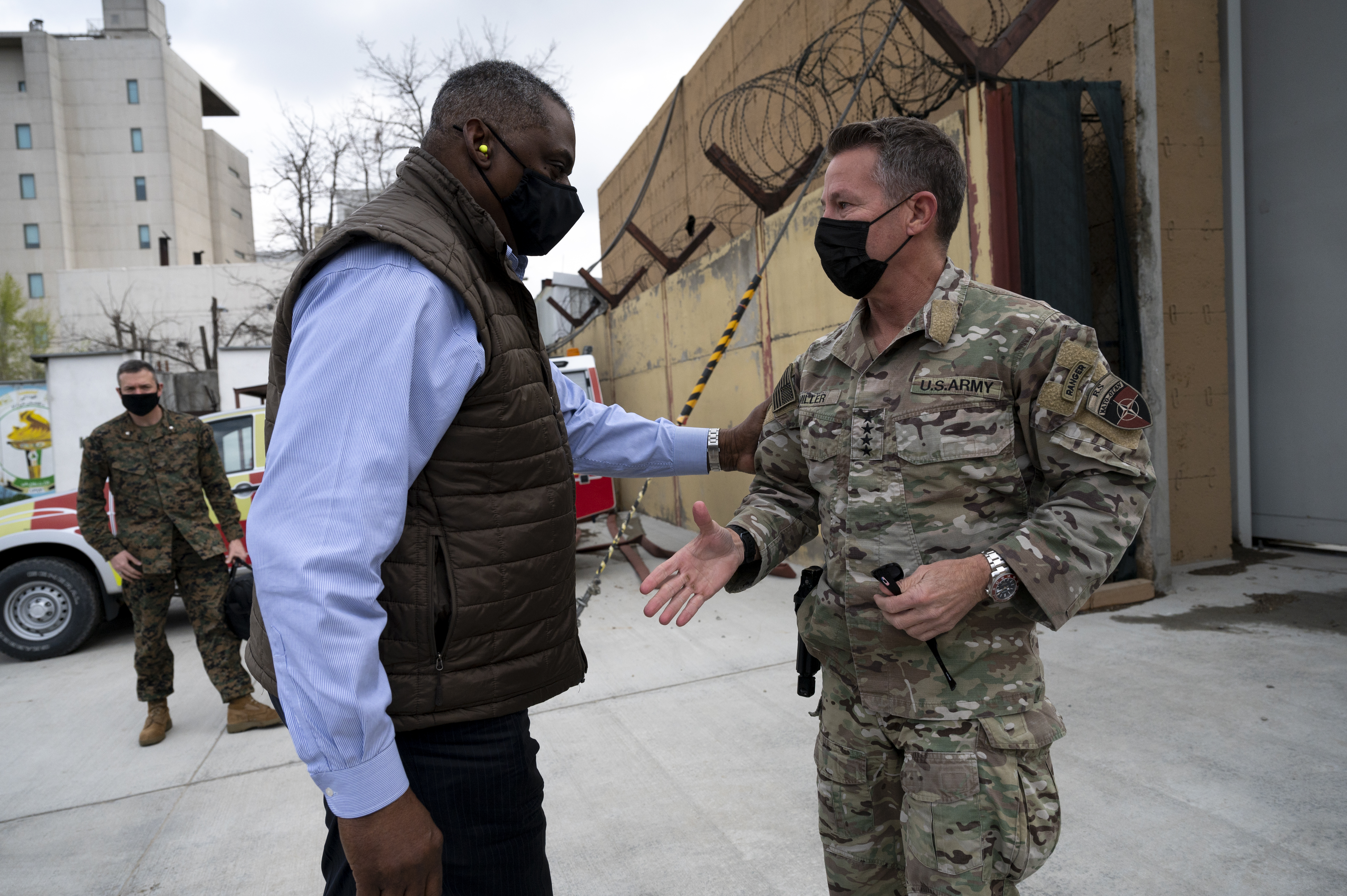
General Austin S. Miller (right) became commander of US and NATO forces in Afghanistan in September 2018 and oversaw the withdrawal until July 2021. Lloyd Austin, the 28th US Secretary of Defense, is on the left.

ISAF was initially charged with securing Kabul and surrounding areas from the Taliban, al-Qaeda and factional warlords, so as to allow for the establishment of the Afghan Transitional Administration headed by Hamid Karzai. In October 2003, the UN Security Council authorized the expansion of the ISAF mission throughout Afghanistan, and ISAF subsequently expanded the mission in four main stages over the whole of the country.

On 31 July 2006, the ISAF additionally took over military operations in the south of Afghanistan from a US-led anti-terrorism coalition. Due to the intensity of the fighting in the south, in 2011 France allowed a squadron of Mirage 2000 fighter/attack aircraft to be moved into the area, to Kandahar, in order to reinforce the alliance's efforts. During its 2012 Chicago Summit, NATO endorsed a plan to end the Afghanistan war and to remove the NATO-led ISAF Forces by the end of December 2014. ISAF was disestablished in December 2014 and replaced by the follow-on training Resolute Support Mission.

On 14 April 2021, NATO Secretary General Jens Stoltenberg said the alliance had agreed to start withdrawing its troops from Afghanistan by 1 May. Soon after the withdrawal of NATO troops started, the Taliban launched an offensive against the Afghan government, quickly advancing in front of collapsing Afghan Armed Forces. By 15 August 2021, Taliban militants controlled the vast majority of Afghanistan and had encircled the capital city of Kabul. Some politicians in NATO member states have described the chaotic withdrawal of Western troops from Afghanistan and the collapse of the Afghan government as the greatest debacle that NATO has suffered since its founding.

=== Iraq training mission ===
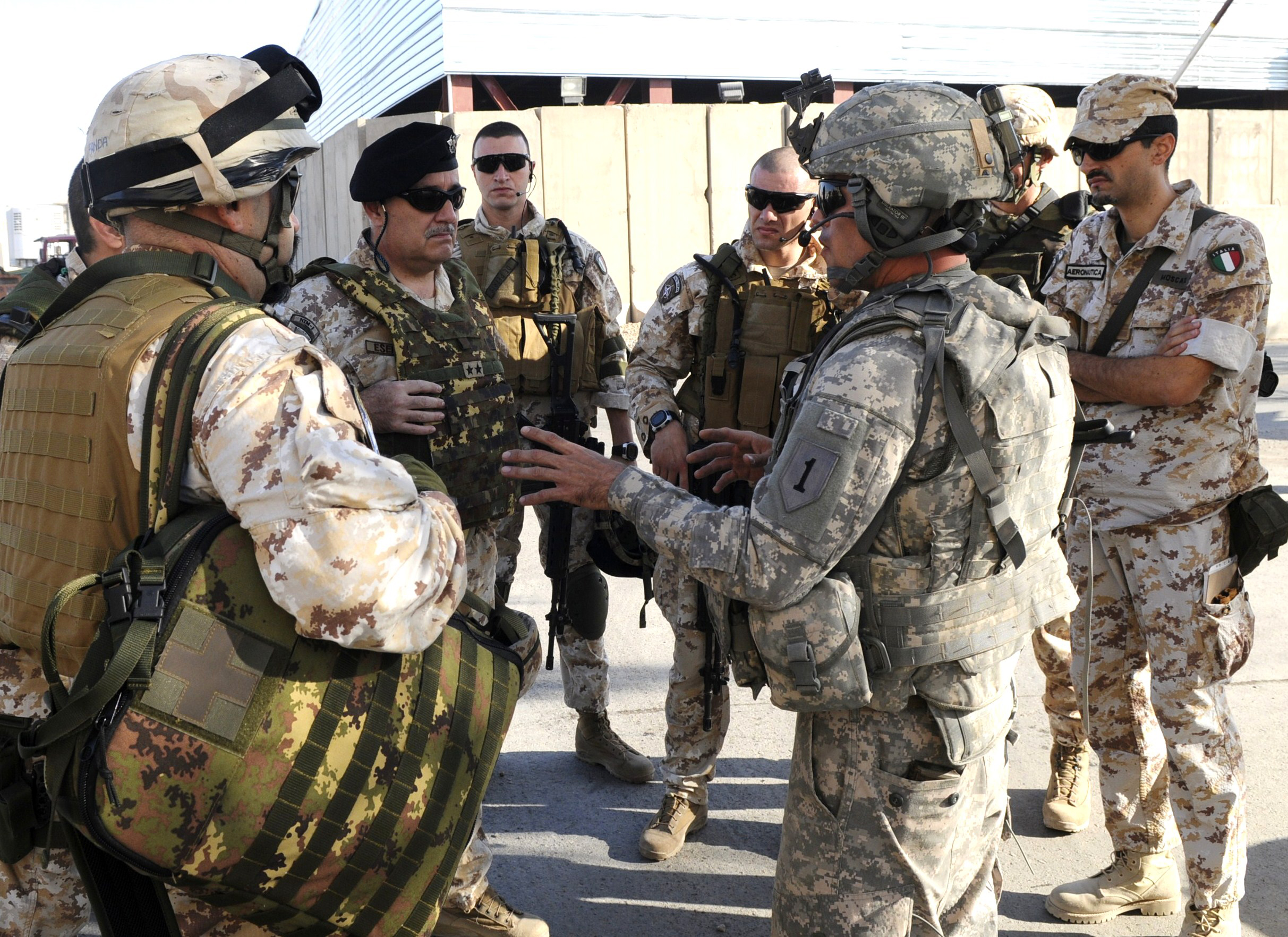
Italian Major General Giovanni Armentani, Deputy Commanding General for the NATO Training Mission, meets with a US Advise and Assist Brigade.

In August 2004, during the Iraq War, NATO formed the NATO Training Mission – Iraq, a training mission to assist the Iraqi security forces in conjunction with the US-led MNF-I. The NATO Training Mission-Iraq (NTM-I) was established at the request of the Iraqi Interim Government under the provisions of UN Security Council Resolution 1546. The aim of NTM-I was to assist in the development of Iraqi security forces training structures and institutions so that Iraq can build an effective and sustainable capability that addresses the needs of the country. NTM-I was not a combat mission but is a distinct mission, under the political control of the North Atlantic Council. Its operational emphasis was on training and mentoring. The activities of the mission were coordinated with Iraqi authorities and the US-led Deputy Commanding General Advising and Training, who was also dual-hatted as the Commander of NTM-I. The mission officially concluded on 17 December 2011.

Turkey invoked the first Article 4 meetings in 2003 at the start of the Iraq War. Turkey also invoked this article twice in 2012 during the Syrian civil war, after the downing of an unarmed Turkish F-4 reconnaissance jet, and after a mortar was fired at Turkey from Syria, and again in 2015 after threats by Islamic State of Iraq and the Levant to its territorial integrity.

=== Gulf of Aden anti-piracy ===
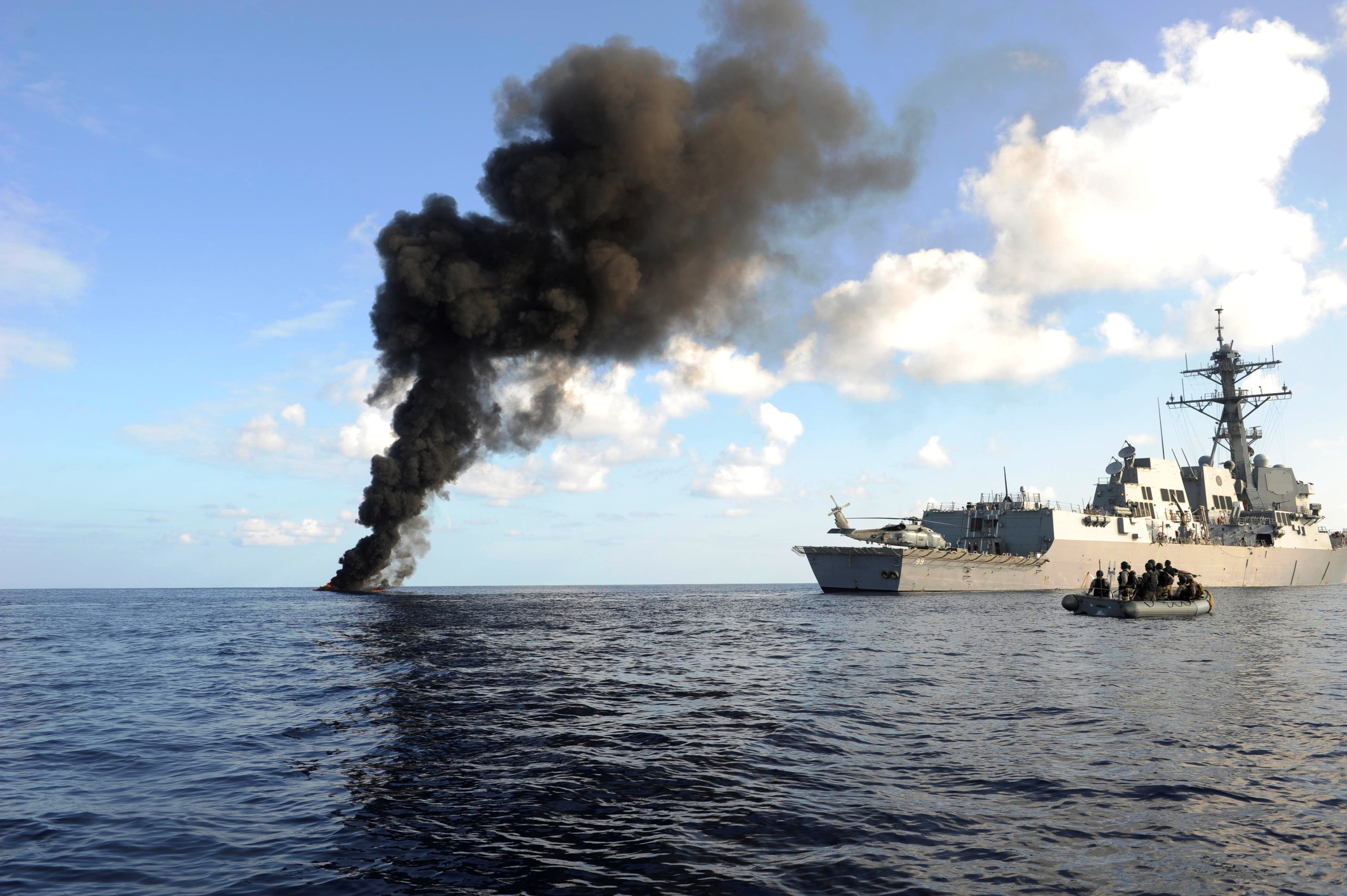
USS Farragut destroying a Somali pirate skiff in March 2010

In 2008 the UN Secretary-General called on member-states to protect the ships of Operation Allied Provider, which was distributing aid as part of the World Food Programme mission in Somalia.

The North Atlantic Council and other countries, including Russia, China and South Korea, formed Operation Ocean Shield. The operation sought to dissuade and interrupt pirate attacks, protect vessels, and to increase the general level of security in the region. Beginning on 17 August 2009, NATO deployed warships in an operation to protect maritime traffic in the Gulf of Aden and the Indian Ocean from Somali pirates, and help strengthen the navies and coast guards of regional states.

=== Libya intervention ===
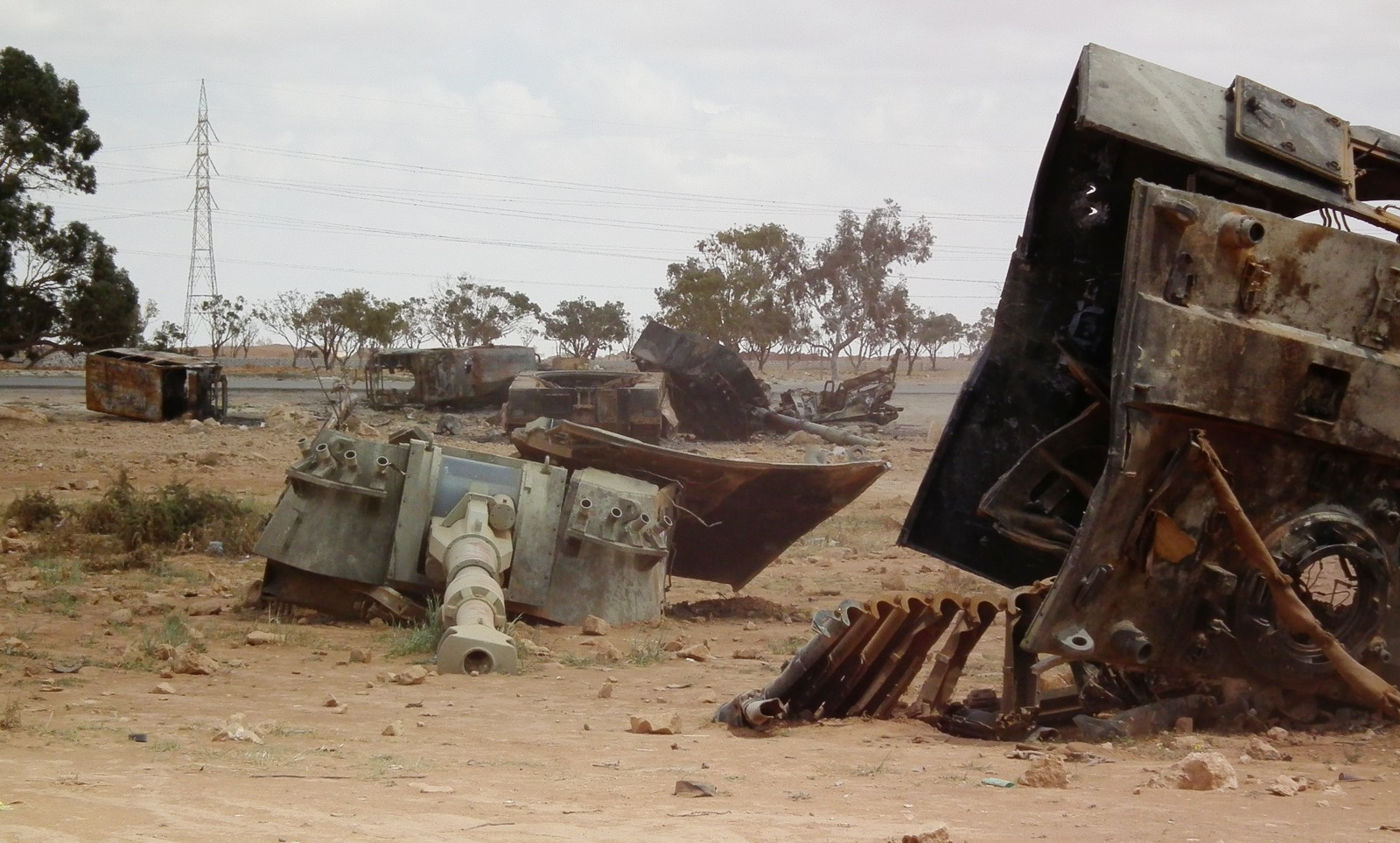
Libyan Army Palmaria howitzers destroyed by the French Air Force near Benghazi in March 2011

During the Libyan Civil War, violence between protesters and the Libyan government under Colonel Muammar Gaddafi escalated. On 17 March 2011, the UN Security Council adopted Resolution 1973, which called for a ceasefire and authorized military action to protect civilians. A coalition that included several NATO members began enforcing a no-fly zone over Libya shortly afterwards, beginning with Opération Harmattan by the French Air Force on 19 March.

On 20 March 2011, NATO states agreed on enforcing an arms embargo against Libya with Operation Unified Protector using ships from NATO Standing Maritime Group 1 and Standing Mine Countermeasures Group 1, and additional ships and submarines from NATO members. They would "monitor, report and, if needed, interdict vessels suspected of carrying illegal arms or mercenaries".

On 24 March, NATO agreed to take control of the no-fly zone from the initial coalition, while command of targeting ground units remained with the coalition's forces. NATO began officially enforcing the UN resolution on 27 March 2011 with assistance from Qatar and the United Arab Emirates. By June, divisions within the alliance had begun to surface as only eight of the 28 member states were participating in combat operations. US Defense Secretary Robert Gates called on countries such as Poland, Spain, the Netherlands, Turkey, and Germany to contribute more, while those countries argued that the organization had overstepped its mandate in the conflict. In his final policy speech in Brussels on 10 June, Gates further criticized allied countries, suggesting their actions could cause the demise of NATO. The German foreign ministry pointed to "a considerable [German] contribution to NATO and NATO-led operations" and to the fact that this engagement was highly valued by President Obama.

While the mission was extended into September, Norway that day (10 June) announced it would begin scaling down contributions and complete withdrawal by 1 August. Earlier that week it was reported Danish air fighters were running out of bombs. The following week, the head of the Royal Navy said the country's operations in the conflict were not sustainable. By the end of the mission in October 2011, after the death of Colonel Gaddafi, NATO planes had flown about 9,500 strike sorties against pro-Gaddafi targets. A report from the organization Human Rights Watch in May 2012 identified at least 72 civilians killed in the campaign.

Following a coup d'état attempt in October 2013, Libyan Prime Minister Ali Zeidan requested technical advice and trainers from NATO to assist with ongoing security issues. NATO agreed to create a small Brussels-based advisory team to help Libya strengthen its security forces.

=== Turkish border ===
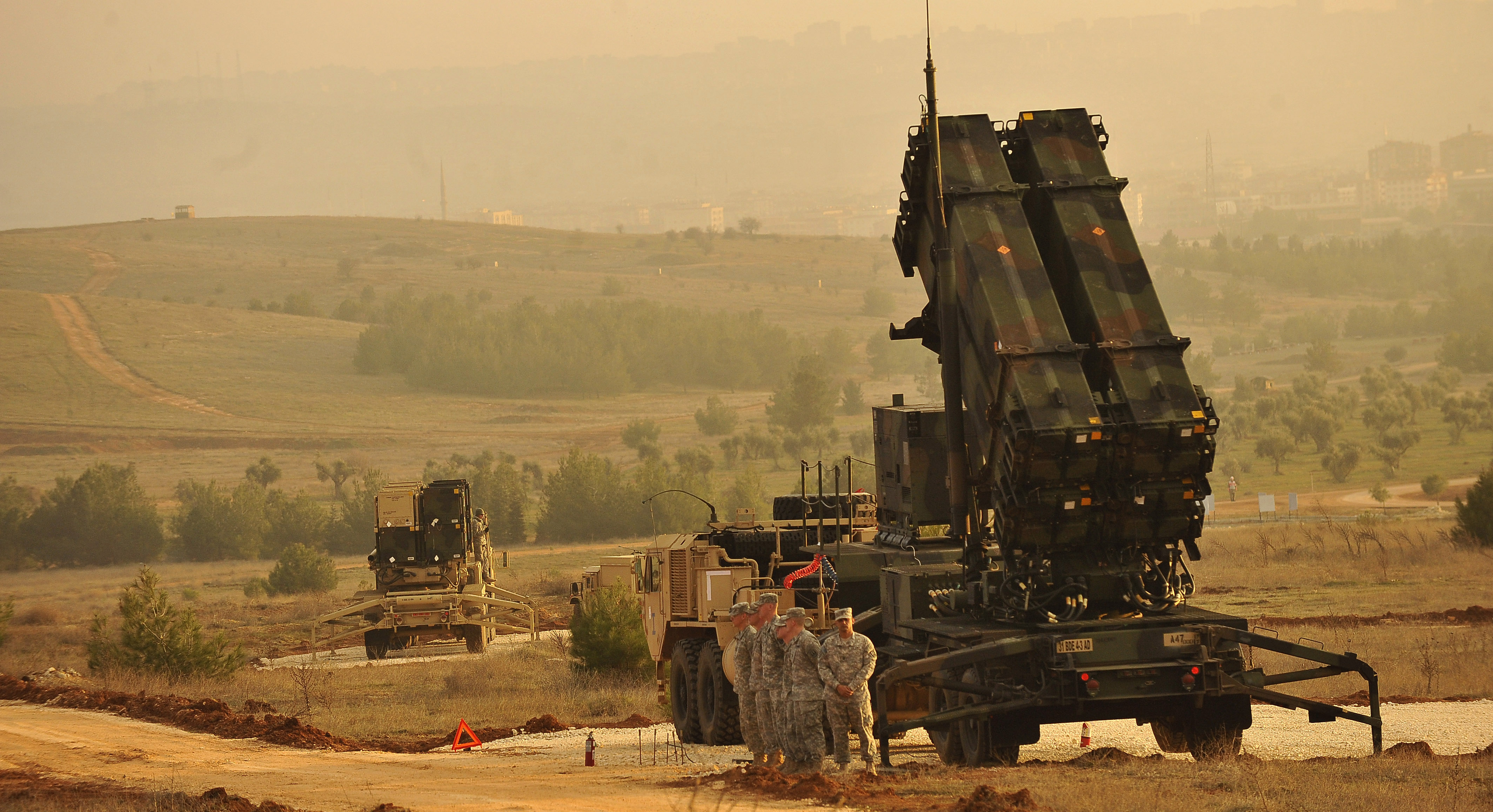
US and NATO Patriot missile batteries in Turkey

Use of Article 5 has been threatened multiple times and four out of seven official Article 4 consultations have been called due to spillover in Turkey from the Syrian civil war. In April 2012, Turkish Prime Minister Recep Tayyip Erdoğan considered invoking Article 5 of the NATO treaty to protect Turkish national security in a dispute over the Syrian civil war. The alliance responded quickly, and a spokesperson said the alliance was "monitoring the situation very closely and will continue to do so" and "takes it very seriously protecting its members."

After the shooting down of a Turkish military jet by Syria in June 2012 and Syrian forces shelling Turkish cities in October 2012 resulting in two Article 4 consultations, NATO approved Operation Active Fence. In the past decade the conflict has only escalated. In response to the 2015 Suruç bombing, which Turkey attributed to ISIS, and other security issues along its southern border, Turkey called for an emergency meeting. The latest consultation happened in February 2020, as part of increasing tensions due to the Northwestern Syria offensive, which involved Syrian and suspected Russian airstrikes on Turkish troops, and risked direct confrontation between Russia and a NATO member.

=== Eastern Sentry ===
Operation Eastern Sentry is a NATO military initiative launched in response to Russian drone incursions into Polish airspace in September 2025. The operation aims to strengthen the alliance's eastern flank and deter further aggression. Multiple member states are contributing military assets, including fighter jets and naval units, to enhance air and ground defense capabilities. Eastern Sentry is designed to provide a flexible and agile response to threats, with a focus on countering drone technology.

== Membership ==
The 32 NATO members are:

- Albania
- Belgium
- Bulgaria
- Canada
- Croatia
- Czech Republic
- Denmark
- Estonia
- Finland
- France
- Germany
- Greece
- Hungary
- Iceland
- Italy
- Latvia
- Lithuania
- Luxembourg
- Montenegro
- Netherlands
- North Macedonia
- Norway
- Poland
- Portugal
- Romania
- Slovakia
- Slovenia
- Spain
- Sweden
- Turkey
- United Kingdom
- United States

NATO members	Membership Action Plan	Enhanced Opportunities Partners	Individual Partnership Action Plan	Partnership for Peace	Mediterranean Dialogue	Istanbul Cooperation Initiative	Global Partners
Albania; Belgium; Bulgaria; Canada; Croatia; Czech Republic; Denmark; Estonia; Finland; France; Germany; Greece; Hungary; Iceland; Italy; Latvia; Lithuania; Luxembourg; Montenegro; Netherlands; North Macedonia; Norway; Poland; Portugal; Romania; Slovakia; Slovenia; Spain; Sweden; Turkey; United Kingdom; United States	Bosnia and Herzegovina	Australia; Georgia; Jordan; Ukraine	Armenia; Azerbaijan; Bosnia and Herzegovina; Georgia; Kazakhstan; Moldova; Serbia; Ukraine	Armenia; Austria; Azerbaijan; Belarus (suspended); Bosnia and Herzegovina; Georgia; Ireland; Kazakhstan; Kyrgyzstan; Malta; Moldova; Russia (suspended); Serbia; Switzerland; Tajikistan; Turkmenistan; Ukraine; Uzbekistan	Algeria; Egypt; Israel; Jordan; Mauritania; Morocco; Tunisia	Bahrain; Kuwait; Qatar; United Arab Emirates	Australia; Colombia; Iraq; Japan; Mongolia; New Zealand; Pakistan; South Korea

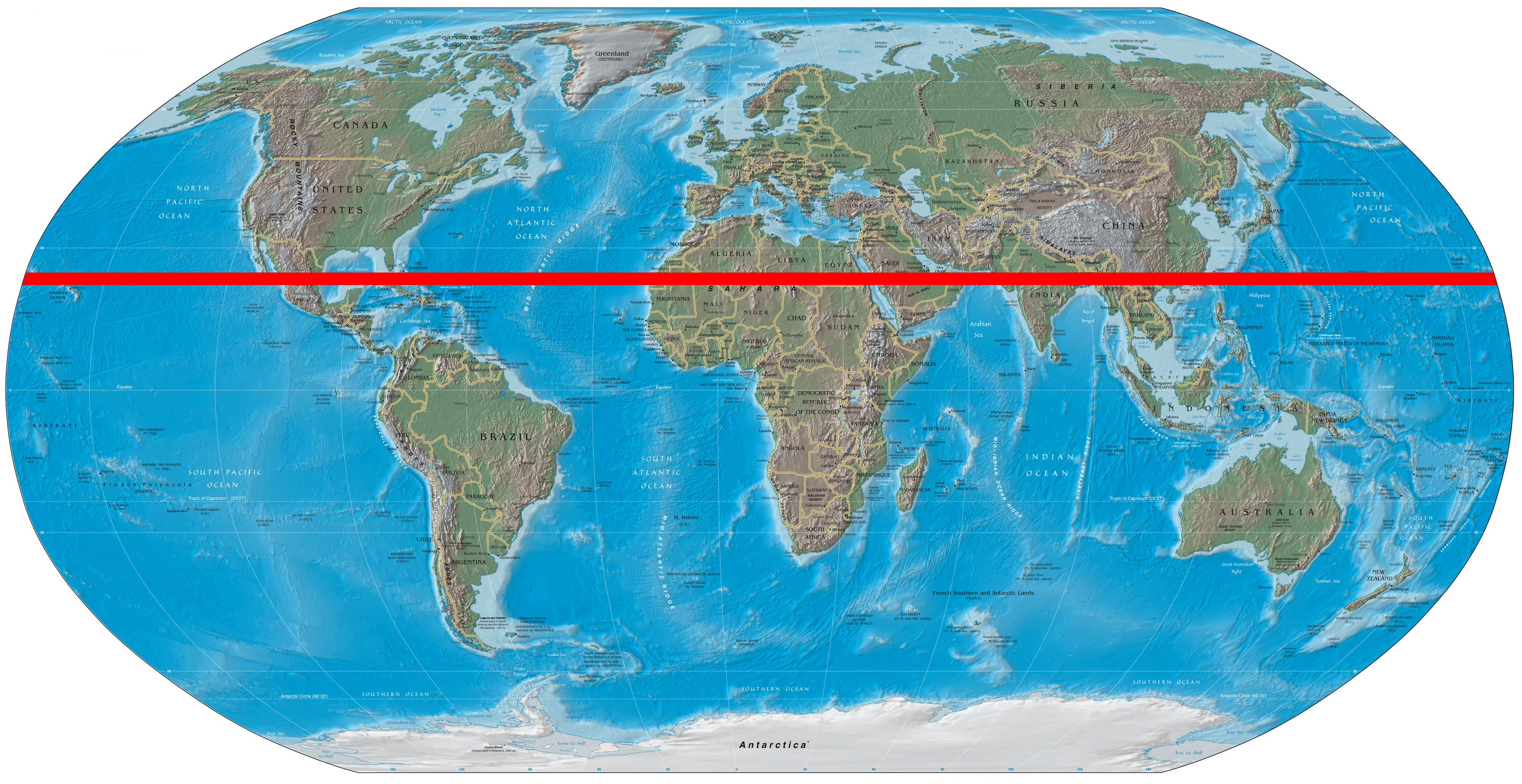
Member states of NATO are not obligated to come to the defence of territory south of the Tropic of Cancer.

NATO has thirty-two members, mostly in Europe with two in North America. NATO's "area of responsibility", within which attacks on member states are eligible for an Article 5 response, is defined under Article 6 of the North Atlantic Treaty to include member territory in Europe, North America, Turkey, and islands in the North Atlantic north of the Tropic of Cancer. Attacks on vessels, aircraft and other forces in the North Atlantic (again, north of the Tropic of Cancer) and the Mediterranean Sea may also provoke an Article 5 response. During the original treaty negotiations, the US insisted that colonies such as the Belgian Congo be excluded from the treaty. French Algeria was, however, covered until its independence on 3 July 1962. Twelve of these thirty-two are original members who joined in 1949, while the other twenty joined in one of ten enlargement rounds.

=== Special arrangements ===
The three Nordic countries which joined NATO as founding members, Denmark, Iceland, and Norway, chose to limit their participation in three areas: there would be no permanent peacetime bases, no nuclear warheads and no Allied military activity (unless invited) permitted on their territory. However, Denmark allows the US Space Force to maintain Pituffik Space Base in Greenland.

From the mid-1960s to the mid-1990s, France pursued a military strategy of independence from NATO under a policy dubbed "Gaullo-Mitterrandism". Nicolas Sarkozy negotiated the return of France to the integrated military command and the Defence Planning Committee in 2009, the latter being disbanded the following year. France remains the only NATO member outside the Nuclear Planning Group and, unlike the US and the UK, will not commit its nuclear-armed submarines to the alliance.

=== Enlargement ===
NATO has added 16 new members since German reunification and the end of the Cold War.

NATO was established on 4 April 1949 by the signing of the North Atlantic Treaty (Washington Treaty). The 12 founding members of the alliance were Belgium, Canada, Denmark, France, Iceland, Italy, Luxembourg, the Netherlands, Norway, Portugal, the United Kingdom, and the United States.

Four new members joined during the Cold War: Greece (1952), Turkey (1952), West Germany (1955) and Spain (1982). Following the dissolution of the Soviet Union, many former Warsaw Pact and post-Soviet states sought membership. In 1990, the territory of the former East Germany was added with the reunification of Germany. At the 1999 Washington summit, Hungary, Poland, and the Czech Republic officially joined, and NATO issued new guidelines for membership, with individualized "Membership Action Plans". These plans governed the addition of new members: Bulgaria, Estonia, Latvia, Lithuania, Romania, Slovakia, and Slovenia in 2004, Albania and Croatia in 2009, Montenegro in 2017, and North Macedonia in 2020. Finland and Sweden are the newest members, joining in 2023 and 2024 respectively, spurred on by the Russo-Ukrainian war.

Ukraine's relationship with NATO began with the NATO–Ukraine Action Plan in 2002. In 2005, Russian president Vladimir Putin said that if Ukraine joined NATO, "we will respect their choice, because it is their sovereign right to decide their own defence policy, and this will not worsen relations between our countries". However, since his 2007 Munich speech, Putin has strongly opposed further enlargement. In 2010, under President Viktor Yanukovych, Ukraine re-affirmed its non-aligned status and renounced aspirations of joining NATO. During the 2014 Ukrainian Revolution, Russia occupied Crimea and supported armed separatists in eastern Ukraine. Because of this, in December 2014 Ukraine's parliament voted to end its non-aligned status, and in 2019 it enshrined the goal of NATO membership in the Constitution. At the June 2021 Brussels Summit, NATO leaders affirmed that Ukraine would eventually join, and supported Ukraine's right to self-determination without interference. In late 2021, there was another massive Russian military buildup on Ukraine's borders. Russian president Putin warned that Ukraine joining NATO, and the deployment of missile defense systems or long-range missiles in Ukraine, would cross a red line. However, Ukraine was a long way from potential membership, and there were no such plans to deploy missiles. The Russian Foreign Ministry drafted a treaty that would forbid Ukraine or any former Soviet state from ever joining NATO. Secretary-General Stoltenberg replied that the decision is up to Ukraine and NATO members, adding "Russia has no veto...and Russia has no right to establish a sphere of influence to try to control their neighbors". NATO offered to improve communications with Russia and discuss missile placements and military exercises, as long as Russia withdrew troops from Ukraine's borders. However, relations diminished after the 2022 Russian invasion of Ukraine. Ukraine applied for NATO membership in September 2022 after Russia proclaimed it had annexed the country's southeast.

Georgia was promised "future membership" during the 2008 summit in Bucharest, but US president Barack Obama said in 2014 that the country was not "currently on a path" to membership.

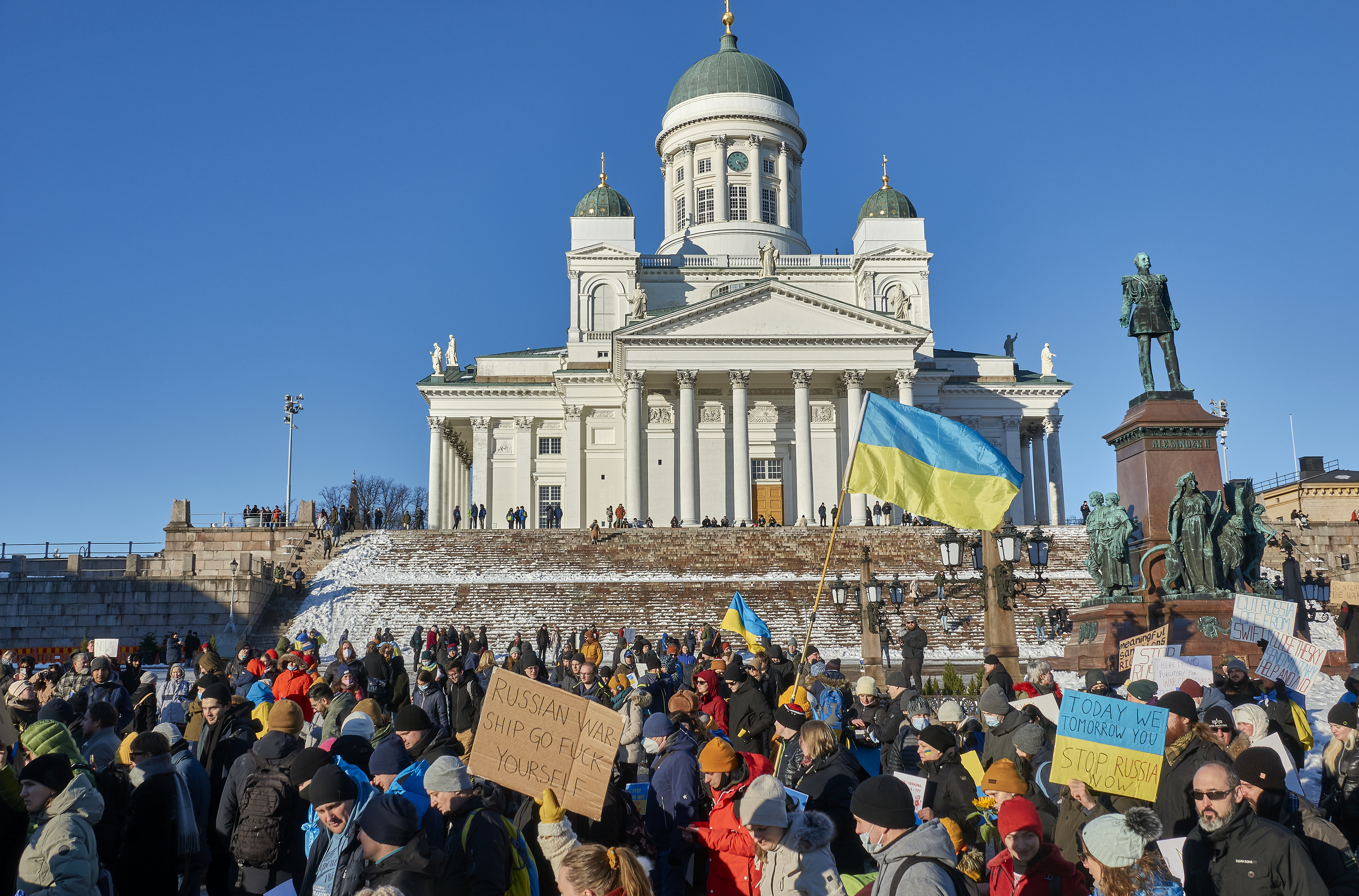
Protestors at a February 2022 rally against Russia's invasion of Ukraine march past the statue of Tsar Alexander II in Senate Square in Helsinki, Finland

NATO has bordered the Russian Federation since 1991, and the two have shared a longer border since the Baltic countries joined in 2004. Russian leaders have said that NATO enlargement went against informal understandings between Soviet leader Mikhail Gorbachev and European and US negotiators that allowed for peaceful German reunification. A June 2016 Levada Center poll found that 68 percent of Russians think that deploying NATO troops in the Baltic states and Poland – former Eastern bloc countries bordering Russia – is a threat to Russia. In contrast, 65 percent of Poles surveyed in a 2017 Pew Research Center report identified Russia as a "major threat", with an average of 31 percent saying so across all NATO countries, and 67 percent of Poles surveyed in 2018 favour US forces being based in Poland. Of non-CIS Eastern European countries surveyed by Gallup in 2016, all but Serbia and Montenegro were more likely than not to view NATO as a protective alliance rather than a threat. A 2006 study in the journal Security Studies argued that NATO enlargement contributed to democratic consolidation in Central and Eastern Europe. China also opposes further expansion.

=== NATO defence expenditure ===
==== Direct contributions ====
Member states pay for NATO's three common funds (the civil and military budgets and the security investment programme) based on a cost-sharing formula that includes per capita gross national income and other factors. In 2023–2024, the US and Germany were the biggest contributors to the NATO budget at 16.2% each.

==== Indirect contributions ====
Member states pay for and maintain their own troops and equipment. They contribute to NATO operations and missions by committing troops and equipment on a voluntary basis. Since 2006, the goal has been for each country to spend at least 2 percent of its gross domestic product on its own defence; in 2014, a NATO declaration said that countries not meeting the goal would "aim to move towards the 2 percent guideline within a decade". In July 2022, NATO estimated that 11 members would meet the target in 2023. On 14 February 2024, NATO Secretary General Jens Stoltenberg said that 18 member states would meet the 2% target in 2024. On 17 June 2024, prior to the 2024 Washington summit, Stoltenberg updated that figure and announced that a record 23 of 32 NATO member states were meeting their defense spending targets of 2% of their country's GDP. NATO added that defense spending for European member states and Canada was up 18% in the past year alone. As of 2024, the following countries were not meeting the 2% contribution goal: Spain (1.28%), Luxembourg (1.29%), Slovenia (1.29%), Belgium (1.3%), Canada (1.37%), Italy (1.49%), Portugal (1.55%), and Croatia (1.81%).

== Partnerships with third countries ==
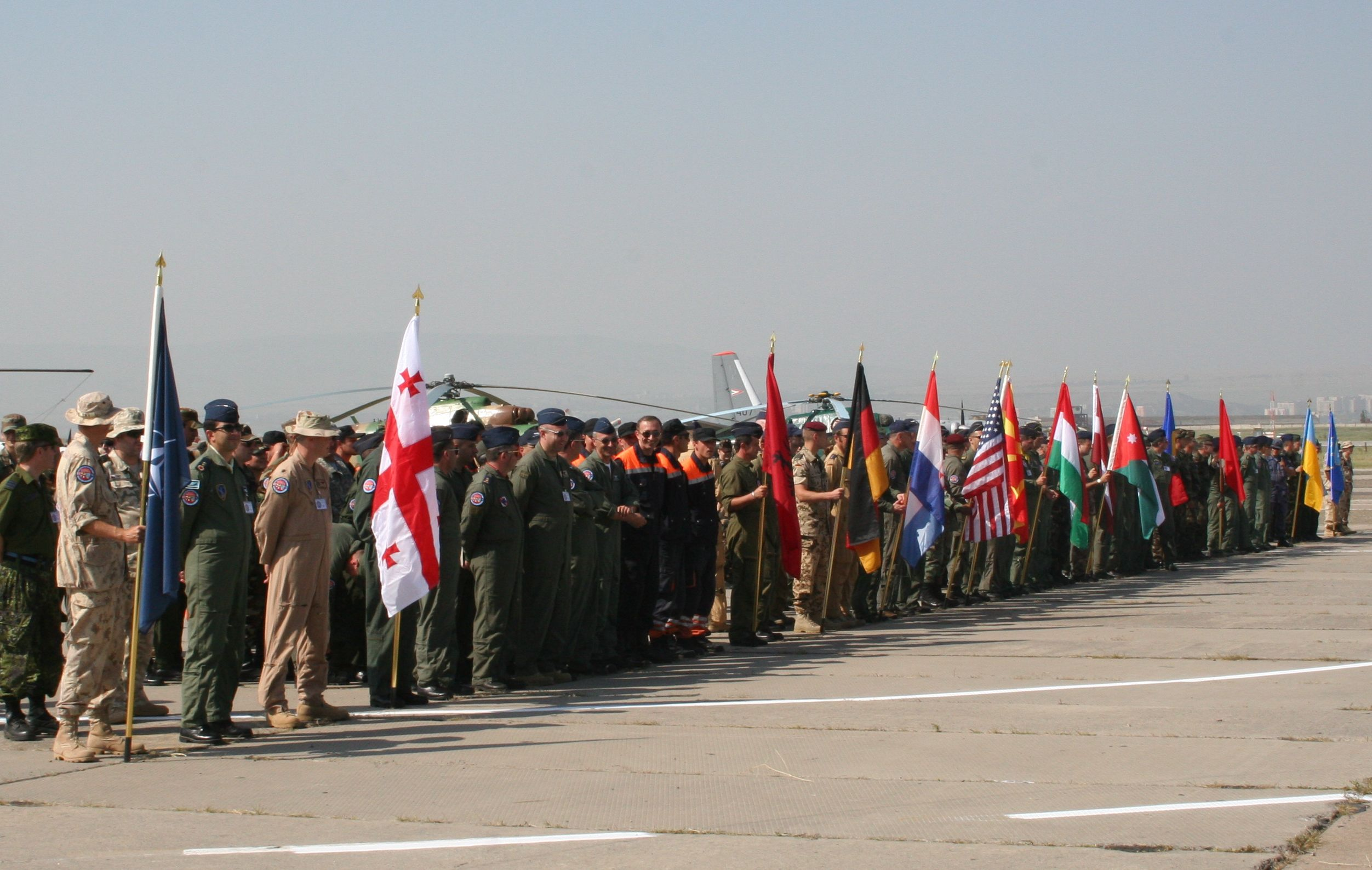
Partnership for Peace conducts multinational military exercises such as Cooperative Archer, which took place in Tbilisi in July 2007 with 500 servicemen from four NATO members, eight PfP members, and Jordan, a Mediterranean Dialogue participant.

The Partnership for Peace (PfP) programme was established in 1994 and is based on individual bilateral relations between each partner country and NATO: each country may choose the extent of its participation. Members include all current and former members of the Commonwealth of Independent States. The Euro-Atlantic Partnership Council (EAPC) was first established on 29 May 1997, and is a forum for regular coordination, consultation and dialogue between all fifty participants. The PfP programme is considered the operational wing of the Euro-Atlantic Partnership. Other third countries have also been contacted for participation in some activities of the PfP framework, such as Afghanistan.

The European Union (EU) signed a comprehensive package of arrangements with NATO under the Berlin Plus agreement on 16 December 2002. With this agreement, the EU was given the possibility of using NATO assets if it wanted to act independently in an international crisis, on the condition that NATO itself did not want to act – the so-called "right of first refusal". For example, Article 42(7) of the 1982 Treaty of Lisbon specifies that "If a Member State is the victim of armed aggression on its territory, the other Member States shall have towards it an obligation of aid and assistance by all the means in their power". The treaty applies globally to specified territories, whereas NATO is restricted under its Article 6 to operations north of the Tropic of Cancer. It provides a "double framework" for the EU countries that are also linked with the PfP programme.

Additionally, NATO cooperates and discusses its activities with numerous other non-NATO members. The Mediterranean Dialogue was established in 1994 to coordinate in a similar way with Israel and countries in North Africa. The Istanbul Cooperation Initiative was announced in 2004 as a dialogue forum for the Middle East along the same lines as the Mediterranean Dialogue. The four participants are also linked through the Gulf Cooperation Council. In June 2018, Qatar expressed a wish to join NATO, who ruled it out, saying that only additional European countries could join according to Article 10 of NATO's founding treaty. Qatar and NATO had earlier signed a joint security agreement, in January 2018.

Political dialogue with Japan began in 1990, and since then, the Alliance has gradually increased its contact with countries that do not form part of any of these cooperation initiatives. In 1998, NATO established a set of general guidelines that do not allow for a formal institutionalization of relations, but reflect the Allies' desire to increase cooperation. Following extensive debate, the term "Contact Countries" was agreed by the Allies in 2000. By 2012, the Alliance had broadened this group, which meets to discuss issues such as counter-piracy and technology exchange, under the names "global partners" or "partners across the globe". Australia and New Zealand, both global partners, are also members of the AUSCANNZUKUS strategic alliance, and similar regional or bilateral agreements between contact countries and NATO members also aid cooperation. NATO Secretary General Jens Stoltenberg stated that NATO needs to "address the rise of China", by closely cooperating with Australia, New Zealand, Japan and South Korea. Colombia is NATO's latest partner and has access to the full range of cooperative activities offered; it is the only Latin American country to cooperate with NATO.

== Structure ==
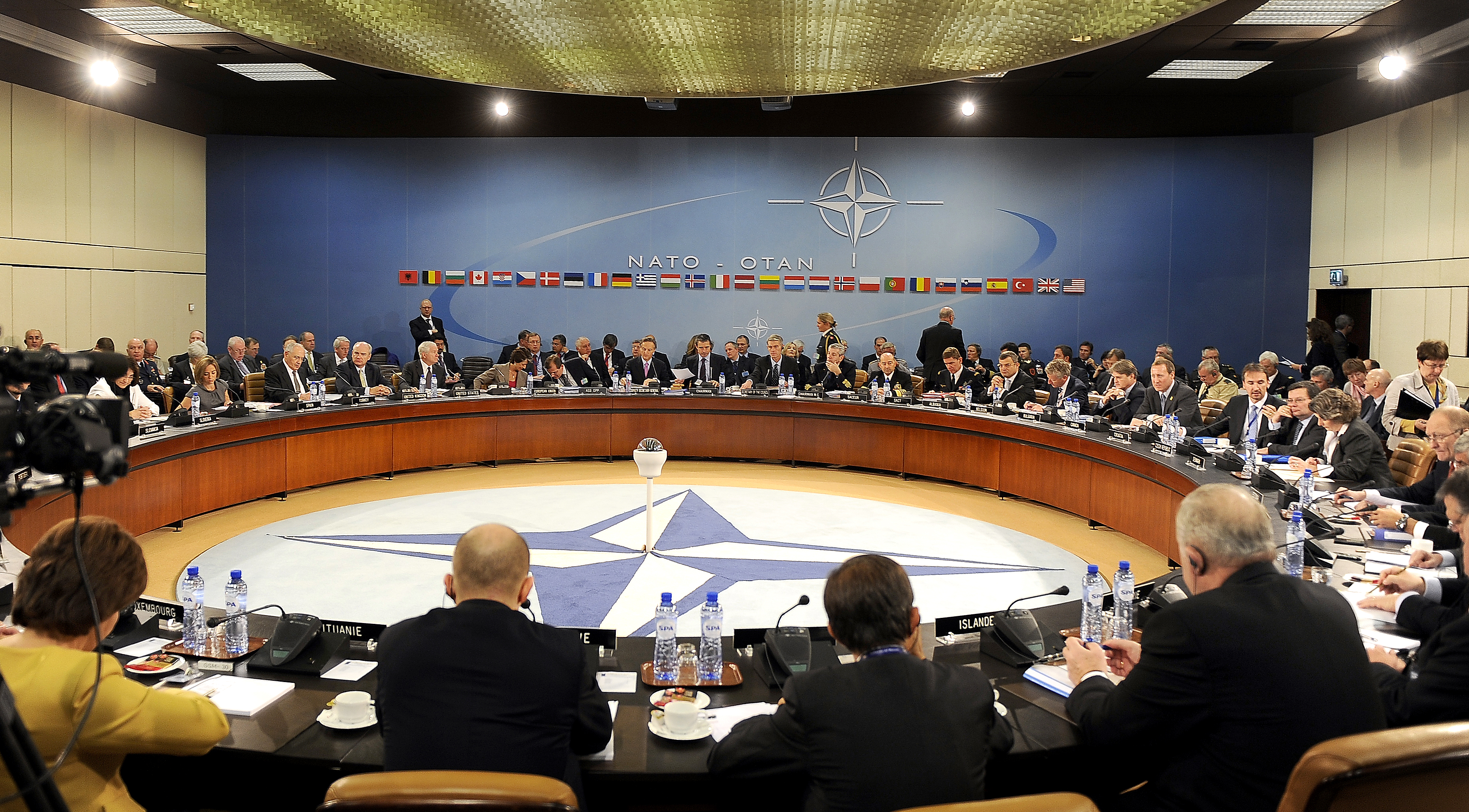
The North Atlantic Council convening in 2010 with a defence/foreign minister configuration

All agencies and organizations of NATO are integrated into either the civilian administrative or military executive roles. For the most part, they perform roles and functions that directly or indirectly support the security role of the alliance as a whole.

The civilian structure includes:

- The North Atlantic Council (NAC) is the body which has effective governance authority and powers of decision in NATO, consisting of member states' permanent representatives or representatives at higher level (ministers of foreign affairs or defence, or heads of state or government). The NAC convenes at least once a week and takes major decisions regarding NATO's policies. The meetings of the North Atlantic Council are chaired by the secretary general and, when decisions have to be made, action is agreed upon by consensus. There is no voting or decision by majority. Each state represented at the Council table or on any of its subordinate committees retains complete sovereignty and responsibility for its own decisions.
- The NATO Parliamentary Assembly (NATO PA) is a body that sets broad strategic goals for NATO, which meets at two session per year. NATO PA interacts directly with the parliamentary structures of the national governments of the member states which appoint Permanent Members, or ambassadors to NATO. The NATO Parliamentary Assembly is made up of legislators from the member countries of the North Atlantic Alliance as well as thirteen associate members. It is however officially a structure different from NATO, and has as aim to join deputies of NATO countries in order to discuss security policies on the NATO Council.
- NATO headquarters, located on Boulevard Léopold III/Leopold III-laan, B-1110 Brussels, which is in the City of Brussels municipality. The staff at the Headquarters is composed of national delegations of member countries and includes civilian and military liaison offices and officers or diplomatic missions and diplomats of partner countries, as well as the International Staff and International Military Staff filled from serving members of the armed forces of member states. Non-governmental groups have also grown up in support of NATO, broadly under the banner of the Atlantic Council/Atlantic Treaty Association movement.
Locations of NATO's two strategic commands — Allied Command Transformation (ACT) with its subordinate centres (blue marks) and Allied Command Operations (ACO), headquartered at Supreme Headquarters Allied Powers Europe (SHAPE) and including its subordinate and joint force commands (red marks).

The military structure includes:

- The Military Committee (MC) is the body of NATO that is composed of member states' Chiefs of Defence (CHOD) and advises the North Atlantic Council (NAC) on military policy and strategy. The national CHODs are regularly represented in the MC by their permanent Military Representatives (MilRep), who often are two- or three-star flag officers. Like the council, from time to time the Military Committee also meets at a higher level, namely at the level of Chiefs of Defence, the most senior military officer in each country's armed forces. The MC is led by its chairman, who directs NATO's military operations. Until 2008 the Military Committee excluded France, due to that country's 1966 decision to remove itself from the NATO Military Command Structure, which it rejoined in 1995. Until France rejoined NATO, it was not represented on the Defence Planning Committee, and this led to conflicts between it and NATO members. Such was the case in the lead up to Operation Iraqi Freedom.
- Allied Command Operations (ACO) is the NATO command responsible for NATO operations worldwide.
- The Rapid Deployable Corps include Eurocorps, I. German/Dutch Corps, Multinational Corps Northeast, and NATO Rapid Deployable Italian Corps among others, as well as naval High Readiness Forces (HRFs), which all report to Allied Command Operations.
- Allied Command Transformation (ACT), responsible for transformation and training of NATO forces.

=== Legal authority of NATO commanders ===
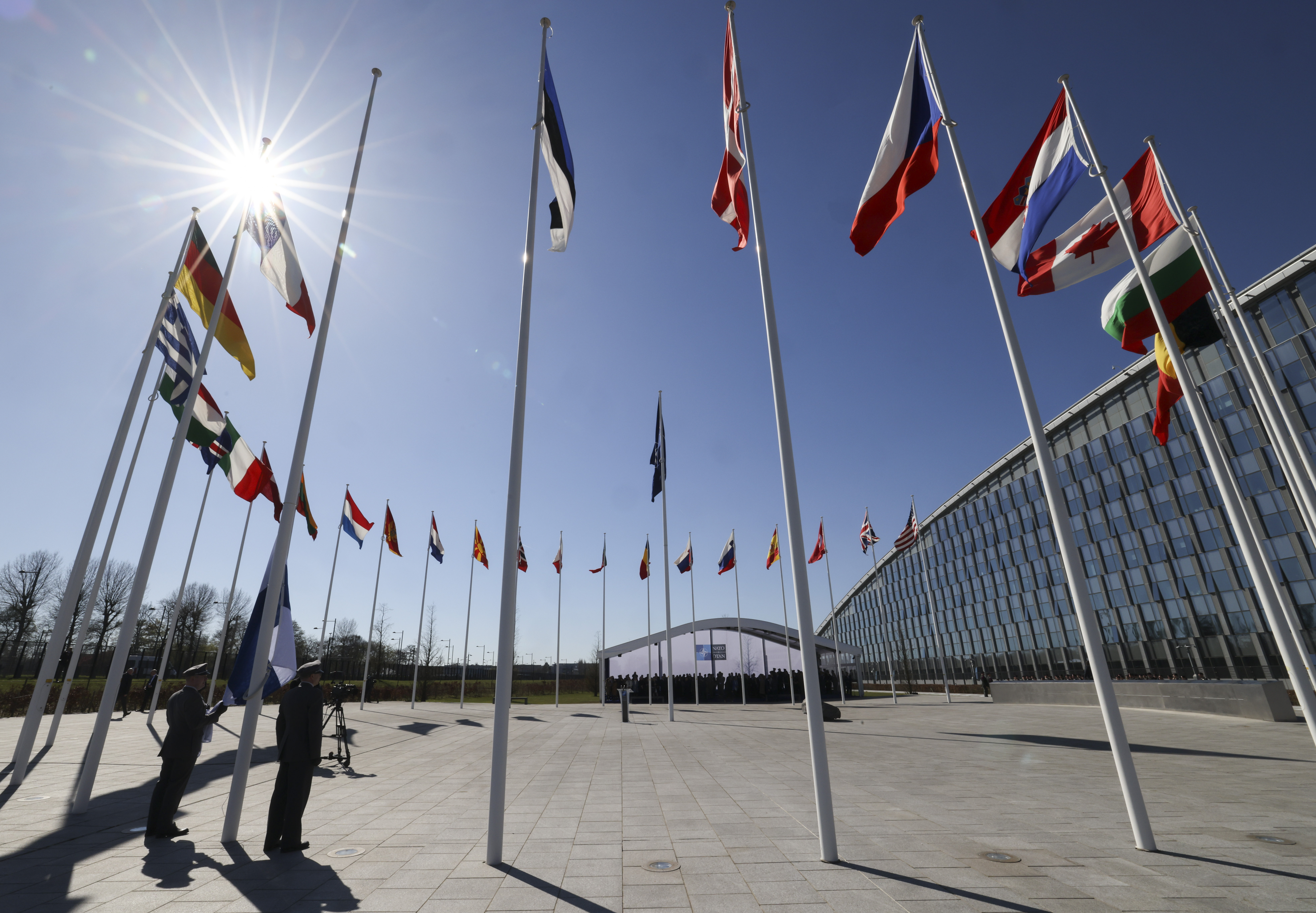
Flags of NATO member countries outside the NATO headquarters in Brussels.

NATO is an alliance of 32 sovereign states and their individual sovereignty is unaffected by participation in the alliance. NATO has no parliaments, no laws, no enforcement, and no power to punish individual citizens. As a consequence of this lack of sovereignty the power and authority of a NATO commander are limited. NATO commanders cannot punish offences such as failure to obey a lawful order; dereliction of duty; or disrespect to a senior officer. NATO commanders expect obedience but sometimes need to subordinate their desires or plans to the operators who are themselves subject to sovereign codes of conduct like the UCMJ. A case in point was the clash between General Sir Mike Jackson and General Wesley Clark over KFOR actions at Pristina Airport.

NATO commanders can issue orders to their subordinate commanders in the form of operational plans (OPLANs), operational orders (OPORDERs), tactical direction, or fragmental orders (FRAGOs) and others. The joint rules of engagement must be followed, and the Law of Armed Conflict must be obeyed at all times. Operational resources "remain under national command but have been transferred temporarily to NATO. Although these national units, through the formal process of transfer of authority, have been placed under the operational command and control of a NATO commander, they never lose their national character." Senior national representatives, like CDS, "are designated as so-called red-cardholders". Caveats are restrictions listed "nation by nation... that NATO Commanders... must take into account".

== See also ==
- Atlanticism – Ideology of European and North American friendship
- Common Security and Defence Policy of the European Union
  - History of the Common Security and Defence Policy
- List of countries in Europe by military expenditures
- List of military alliances
- List of military equipment of NATO
- Major non-NATO ally – Special designation of the United States
- Ranks and insignia of NATO – Military rank equivalents within NATO
- NATO strategy in the Arctic
- NATO Arctic Sentry

=== Similar organizations ===
- ANZUS – Australia, New Zealand, United States Security Treaty
- AUKUS – Australia, United Kingdom, United States
- Balkan Pact – SFR Yugoslavia with NATO members Greece and Turkey
- Collective Security Treaty Organization (CSTO) – Russia and some former Soviet republics
- Five Eyes – Australia, Canada, New Zealand, United Kingdom, United States intelligence services
- Five Power Defence Arrangements (FPDA) – Series of Commonwealth defence relationships from 1971
- Free World Military Assistance Forces (FWMAF)
- Inter-American Treaty of Reciprocal Assistance – 1947 collective defense treaty
- Islamic Military Counter Terrorism Coalition (IMCTC) – Intergovernmental counterterrorist military alliance
- Middle East Treaty Organization (METO) – Cold War military alliance (1955–1979)
- Northeast Asia Treaty Organization (NEATO) – 1950s proposed collective defense organization
- Shanghai Cooperation Organisation (SCO) – Eurasian multilateral security organisation
- South Atlantic Peace and Cooperation Zone
- Southeast Asia Treaty Organization (SEATO) – Collective defense organization (1955–1977)
- United Nations Command (UNC)
