= Syrian–Turkish border clashes during the Syrian civil war =

Military clashes

Syrian–Turkish border clashes during the Syrian Civil War
- Part of Syrian civil war and Turkish involvement in the Syrian civil war
- Locations in Turkey attacked by Syria
Date	22 June 2012 – 19 November 2022 (10 years, 4 months and 4 weeks)
Location	Syria and Turkey
Status	Border clashes ended

Belligerents
Syria	Turkey

Commanders and leaders
(Syria) Bashar al-Assad (Syria) Ali Abdullah Ayyoub (Syria) Ali Mahmoud Abbas	(Turkey) Abdullah Gül (until 2014) (Turkey) Recep Tayyip Erdoğan (Turkey) Necdet Özel

Casualties and losses
12 soldiers killed 23 soldiers wounded (Syrian opposition claim)	5 civilians killed

As the civil uprising phase of the Syrian civil war turned into an all-out civil war, the 911-kilometre-long (600 mi) Syria–Turkey border became the scene of minor military clashes between the Turkish Army and various factions in the war to the south.

One of the most serious of these occurred on 3 October 2012, when an artillery shell fired from Syria by the Syrian Army killed five and injured at least ten Turkish citizens in the border town of Akçakale in Şanlıurfa Province, Turkey. Turkish Armed Forces artillery units conducted saturation shelling of Syrian military posts.

Since the beginning of the Turkish occupation of northern Syria in 2016, Turkey now controls much of the border region inside Syria, mostly taken from the Syrian Democratic Forces. Border clashes ended in 2022.

== 2011–2012 incidents ==
Turkey, which was supporting the Syrian government in the beginning of the Syrian civil war, condemned President Bashar al-Assad over the use of violent force against protesters and has requested his departure from office. In June through July 2011, Turkey began sheltering the Free Syrian Army, offering the group a safe zone and a base of operation. Together with Saudi Arabia and Qatar, Turkey has also provided the rebels with arms and other military equipment.

During 5 December 2011, about 35 armed fighters tried to cross the border of Syria from Turkey, but were engaged by the Syrian border forces who were able to repel them back to Turkey. Once they were back on Turkish soil, the Turkish army allegedly picked them up in trucks and took care of the injured fighters. A further attempt happened during the night of 12 December, when 15 infiltrators tried again to cross the border. They were unsuccessful and two of them were killed by Syrian border patrols.

On 22 June 2012, a Turkish F-4 reconnaissance jet was shot down by Syrian government forces. Both pilots were killed. Syria stated that it had shot the fighter down using anti-aircraft artillery near the village of Om al-Tuyour, while it was flying over Syrian territorial waters one kilometre away from land. Turkey's foreign minister stated the jet was shot down in international airspace after accidentally entering Syrian airspace, while it was on a training flight to test Turkey's radar capabilities. Turkish Prime Minister Recep Tayyip Erdoğan vowed retaliation, saying:

"The rules of engagement of the Turkish Armed Forces have changed [...] Turkey will support Syrian people in every way until they get rid of the bloody dictator and his gang."

Ankara acknowledged that the jet had flown over Syria for a short time, but said such temporary overflights were common, had not led to an attack before, and alleged that Syrian helicopters had violated Turkish airspace five times without being attacked and that a second, search-and-rescue jet had been fired at. Assad later expressed regret over the incident. In August 2012, reports appeared in some Turkish newspapers claiming that the Turkish General Staff had deliberately misinformed the Turkish government about the fighter's location when it was shot down. The reports said that a NATO command post at İzmir and a British base in Cyprus had confirmed that the fighter was shot down inside Syrian waters and that radar intelligence from U.S. forces had disproved any "accidentally entered Syrian waters" flightpath error. The General Staff denied the claims.

== 2 October 2012 incident and afterwards ==
=== Attacks from Syria ===
As the clashes between the government forces and the opposition in Syria intensified, artillery shells began to fall across the border onto Turkish soil. On 3 October 2012 at 16:25 EEST (13:25 UTC), a bomb fired from Syria hit a house in the central area of Akçakale. A 39-year-old mother and her three children aged between eight and 14 years and another woman of 40 years of age were killed by the blast. Thirteen others, including police officers, were injured. Three of the injured had light wounds while two of them were severely wounded. The source of the shells and their manufacturer remain unknown as Turkish authorities have not released a ballistic test.

=== Turkish military retaliation ===
At 18:00 (local time in Turkey; GMT/UTC + 02:00) the same day, five F-16 fighters from the 8th Main Jet Base Group of the 2nd Tactical Air Force Command at Diyarbakır Air Base and RF-4E reconnaissance aircraft from the 7th Main Jet Base Group Command in Malatya Erhaç Air Base conducted reconnaissance missions along the border, identifying Syrian military targets and relaying their coordinates to the Turkish Armed Forces Command in Ankara. Turkish artillery then conducted saturation shelling of these targets with T-155 Fırtına howitzers, which have a firing range of 40–45 kilometres (25–28 mi). The targeted region was Ayn al-Arus of Tal Abyad town in Raqqa Governorate across Akçakale.

According to the Syrian Observatory for Human Rights, Turkish shelling of a military post in Syria on 4 October 2012 resulted in the death of three Syrian soldiers.

=== Mandate by Turkish parliament ===
On 4 October 2012 the Grand National Assembly of Turkey, the Turkish parliament, passed a motion by a vote of 320-129 authorizing the use of military ground troops to enter "foreign countries" for operations. The one-year mandate, according to Turkish officials, is not expected to be carried out.

=== October 2012 incidents ===
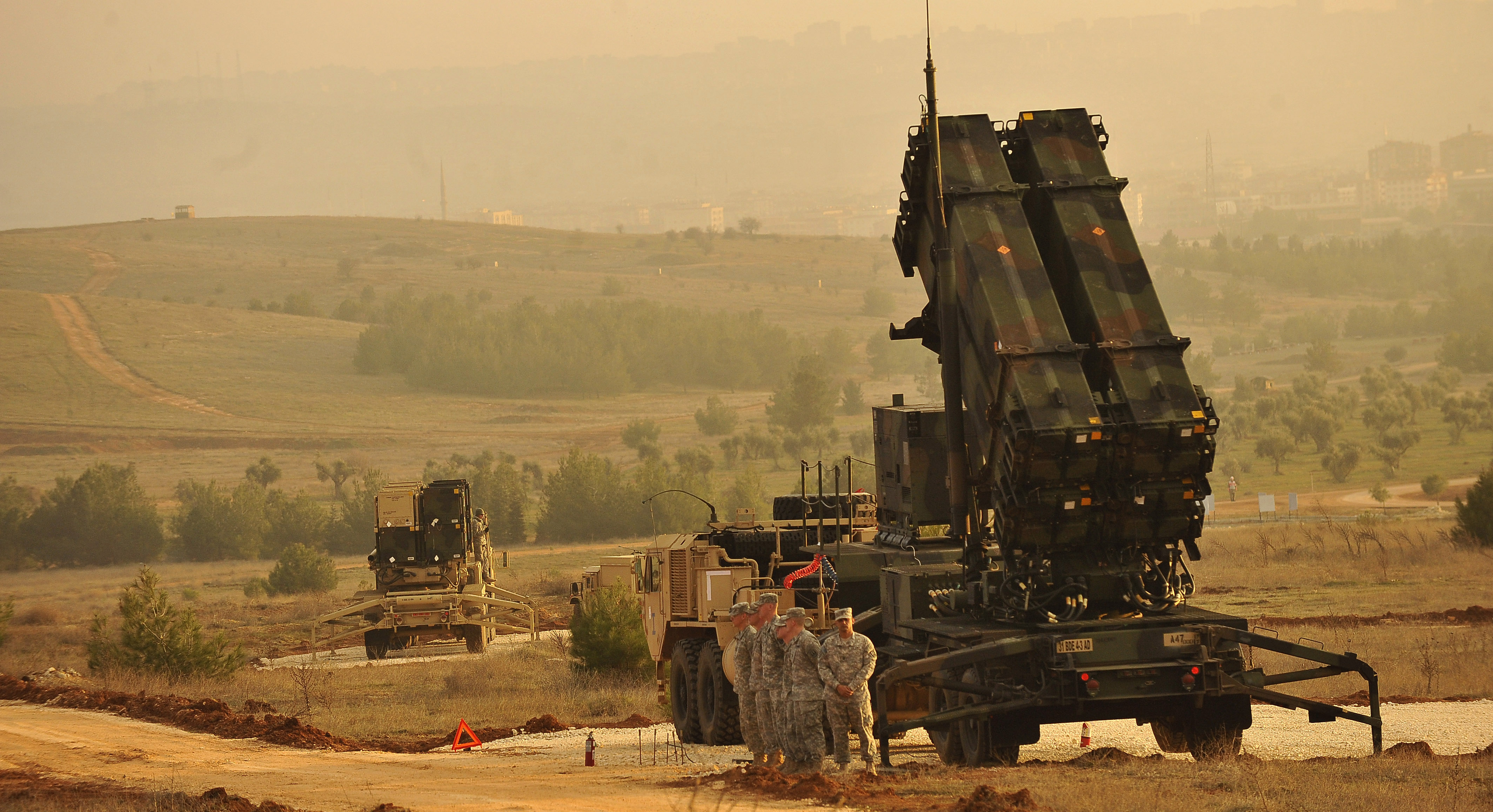
Six batteries of NATO-backed missile defense systems set up in southeastern Turkey to protect against aerial attacks from war-torn Syria.

On 5 October 2012, shells fired by Syrian artillery in Latakia landed in the rural area of Aşağıpulluyazı village (Coordinates: 35°51′32.54″N 36°09′13.23″E) in the Yayladağı district of Hatay Province. The day before, Turkish Prime Minister Recep Tayyip Erdoğan had announced at a press conference during the official visit of Iranian First Vice President Mohammad-Reza Rahimi that a Syrian shell had fallen in Altınözü, Hatay Province. The second incident caused no damage to persons or property. Immediately after this second incident in Hatay, artillery of the Turkish 3rd Border Battalion stationed in Yayladağı fired on Syrian military targets.

A grain depot in Akcakale suffered minor damage from shrapnel from a Syrian mortar round exploding on 6 October 2012, though no injuries were reported. Turkey responded by shelling Syrian military targets over the border and positioning a platoon of ACV-300 armored personnel carriers on the southern edge of Akçakale, with their weapons pointed at Tel Abyad, a town a few kilometres into Syria.

On 8 October 2012, Altınözü was again hit by Syrian mortar fire, the six shells landed in a rural area causing no injury or loss of life. Turkey responded soon after by shelling Syrian positions.

On 10 October 2012, Turkish Air Force F-16s intercepted a Syrian Air Airbus A320, flight RB442 from Moscow to Damascus, in Turkish airspace and forced it to land at Esenboğa International Airport, suspecting it was carrying Russian-made weapons. Inspectors claimed confiscating ammunition, military communications equipment and items "thought to be missile parts", however evidence has not been publicly shown. The Russian foreign minister denied the claims and said that the plane cargo included only radar units.

On 17 October 2012, Turkish artillery fired into Syria after a Syrian mortar shell landed on Turkish territory in Hatay province. No casualties were reported on either side.

On 23 October 2012, an anti-aircraft shell struck a health center in Reyhanlı, approximately 200 yards (180 m) from the Syrian border. The shell landed in an empty room, and no injuries were reported. It was apparently fired from Harem, Idlib Governorate, where clashes were reportedly underway between rebels and government troops.

Two Syrian anti-aircraft shells struck 300 meters north of the village of Beşaslan in Hatay Province, Turkey on 29 October 2012, to which Turkey immediately responded by firing artillery rounds into Syria. Neither side reported casualties.

In the morning hours of 12 November 2012, a Syrian military helicopter bombed rebel positions around the town of Ras al-Ayn near the Turkish border across Ceylanpınar in Şanlıurfa Province. The rebels responded with heavy machine gun fire. Soon later, a Syrian fighter jet bombed the area. Glass windows of some buildings in the center of Ceylanpınar shattered by the blast. One Turkish soldier and two civilians on the Turkish side were reportedly wounded during the incident. Fleeing Syrian civilians and militants crossed the border into Turkish territory. Several injured refugees were taken into a hospital in Ceylanpınar by ambulances. The town's mayor warned the residents not to come close to the border for their own security.

== 2013–2014 ==
=== January 2013 incident ===
In the early hours of 14 January 2013, a shell fired by unknown Syrian forces landed in an olive grove near the border village of Akçabağlar, causing no casualties. On 30 January, Syrian refugees tried to cross the border between Turkey and Syria but were turned back under fire by Turkish forces. Two Syrian civilians were wounded in the incident with no Turkish casualties reported.

=== February 2013 border-crossing bombing ===
On 11 February 2013, a bomb exploded at the Turkish–Syrian border crossing in Cilvegözü, killing 14. According to the BBC, the deadly attack killed 17 people and injured 30 more.

=== May 2013 Akçakale incident ===
On 2 May 2013, fighting occurred between Syrian anti-government insurgents and Turkish border guards at the Akçakale border crossing. One Turkish border guard was killed in the engagement, reportedly the first armed clashes between Turkish government agents and anti-Assad militants.

=== May 2013 Reyhanlı bombing ===
On 11 May 2013, two car bombs exploded in the Turkish city of Reyhanlı, killing at least 40 and injuring over 100. Turkish residents of the town reportedly attacked Syrian refugees and automobiles with Syrian license plates following the bombing.

=== September 2013 Syrian helicopter shot down ===
On 16 September 2013, Turkish fighter jets that took off from Malatya Erhaç Air Base shot down a Syrian Mi-17 helicopter that violated Turkish airspace according to vice prime minister Bülent Arınç.

=== January 2014 incident on Syrian border near Qamishli ===
Five Syrian Kurds were killed while crossing the border into Turkey on 20 January 2014. Zahir Mulla and Muhammad Ahmad were killed along with other three men (whose identities couldn't be identified), when Turkish border guards opened fire. Others, who accompanied the victims, were hardly beaten by the Turkish guards.

=== March 2014 Turkish shootdown of a Syrian aircraft ===
On 23 March 2014, Turkish fighter jets shot down a Syrian warplane. The Syrian Arab Republic claims that its aircraft was in Syrian airspace on a mission to attack rebel held areas in the city of Latakia when it was shot down by Turkey in an act of "blatant aggression". The Syrian pilot successfully ejected from the aircraft. Turkish Prime Minister Erdoğan stated that Turkish F-16s shot down the aircraft for violating Turkish airspace and said that the Turkish "response will be heavy if you violate our airspace".

=== Siege of Kobanî ===
In the early fall of 2014, the Kurdish town of Kobanî, which is yards from the Turkish border, was besieged by ISIS. When shells and other munitions occasionally crossed into Turkish territory, the Turkish army would shoot back. There was also a massive refugee problem, and this led to riots in Turkey and further action by the parliament.

== 2015 incidents ==
In the night of 21–22 February 2015, a convoy of 572 Turkish troops in 39 tanks and 57 armoured vehicles entered Syria through Kobanî to evacuate the 38-man Turkish military garrison guarding the Suleyman Shah tomb and move the remains of Suleyman Shah to a different site because of a rumored attack threat of ISIL. The Turkish military did not seek permission from Syria to carry out the mission, the Syrian Foreign Ministry condemned the move, saying that Turkey "committed an act of flagrant aggression on Syrian land".

On 16 May 2015, a Turkish Air Force F-16 shot down an Iranian made Mohajer 4 UAV that had violated Turkish airspace over Hatay province entering 11 km into Turkish airspace. Initial claims by the Turkish government mentioned an intruding helicopter was shot down, but later it was admitted that the downed aircraft was an UAV as claimed by the Syrian side.

In May, there was a public scandal over video footage released by the newspaper Cumhuriyet purporting to show Turkish intelligence shipping arms to Syrian Islamist rebels. The editor-in-chief and more than thirty officers involved in the search and the attempted search of another truck of weapons some time earlier now face charges for breaking counter-terrorism laws, attempting to overthrow the government and military espionage.

== 2016 incidents ==
On 1 February Syria accused the Turkish military of shelling a location in the country's northern Latakia province. Because of the shelling civilians had been injured. Syrian government condemned the attack.

Also, the Russian Ministry of Defence presented a video which claims that shows Turkish military shelling Syrian territory using heavy artillery positioned close to the border. According to Syria's General Staff, Syrian opposition groups have also provided video evidence of the Turkish military shelling Syrian territory.

On 13 February 2016, Turkey began heavy artillery bombing of Kurds in North Aleppo and at Azaz as they advanced against opposition groups. The U.S. urged Turkey to stop the shelling of the Kurds and focus on fighting the group Islamic State (IS), however, Turkey defied the U.S. and French calls and continued the shelling the next day too. Also, in a telephone call with German Chancellor Angela Merkel, Turkish Prime Minister Ahmet Davutoglu said Turkey will continue to strike back at Kurdish fighters in Syria. Kurdish officials said that at least three YPG fighters have died since the shelling started on Saturday.

Syria called the Turkish strikes a violation of its territory, and urged UN Security Council action to "put an end to the crimes of the Turkish regime". It also accused Ankara of allowing some 100 gunmen to enter Syria, also, the Syrian Observatory for Human Rights said some 350 Islamist fighters had been allowed to travel through Turkish territory on Saturday 14 February 2016 to reinforce Islamist rebels in Azaz and Tal Rifaat.

Turkish artillery also targeted Syrian forces on both days.

The Syrian government has accused Turkey, Qatar and Saudi Arabia of being behind a wave of bombings in the coastal cities of Tartous and Jableh. At least five suicide bombers and two devices planted in cars killed nearly 150 people and wounded at least 200. Islamic State claimed responsibility for the attacks. The attacks were the first of their kind in Tartous and in Jableh. This part of Syria had escaped the worst of the civil war till these attacks. These cities were government-controlled territory that hosted Russian military bases. Russia had

== 2022 incidents ==
On 19 November 2022, Turkey launched airstrikes over several towns in northern Syria, a week after the 2022 Istanbul bombing.

== Clashes inside Syria ==
Dozens of Syrian Army soldiers were killed by Turkish Armed Forces and allied groups in Afrin during 2018 Operation Olive Branch.

On 13 June 2019, during an ongoing offensive by the Syrian government against rebels in Idlib and Hama, pro-government forces reportedly targeted Turkish observation forces stationed in the area as part of demilitarization agreement between Russia, Turkey, and Iran. The Turkish Minister of Defense stated that the attack on Turkish forces included 35 mortar shells, 3 Turkish soldiers were reportedly wounded as a result, soon after the Russian government claimed that a cease-fire had been established between Turkey, Russia, the rebels, and the Syrian government, however the rebels and Turkish government denied a cease-fire had been implemented. In response to the attacks Turkish foreign minister Mevlüt Çavuşoğlu stated the attacks were intentional, the Turkish government also stated the Turkish military would respond to any attacks on their positions in Syria. The Russian military denied the Syrian government was behind the attack but instead blamed the Syrian rebels calling them "terrorists", for attacking Turkish positions, the Russian government also claimed that the Turkish government had asked the Russian military for help in protecting Turkish forces in Idlib and that the Turkish government had given the coordinates of rebel positions to the Russian military.

On 14 June, the Turkish military sent reinforcements to Idlib. On 16 June, the Turkish government claimed that Turkish positions in Idlib had again come under Syrian government fire and retaliated by shelling Syrian government positions. On 19 August, a Turkish military convoy headed towards Khan Shaykhun was targeted by Syrian warplanes multiple times. The airstrikes resulted in casualties and forced the convoy to halt. On 23 August, following the capture of a rebel pocket in the region, the Syrian Army fully encircled the Turkish observation post at Murak.

In 2019, 29 Syrian Army soldiers were killed by Turkish Armed Forces and allied groups in North East Syria during Operation Peace Spring.

== NATO response ==
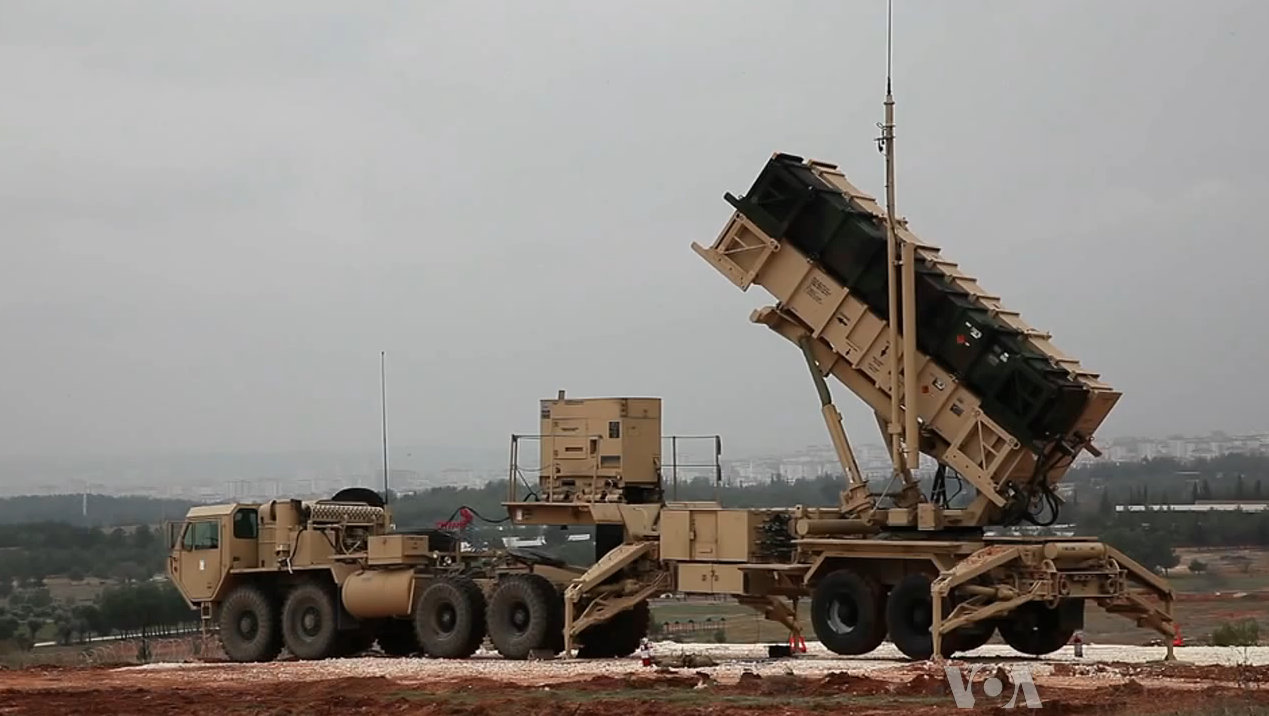
NATO-backed missile defense system stationed in Gaziantep, Turkey.

Following Ankara's invocation of Article IV of the Washington Treaty, NATO's North Atlantic Council stated that the alliance:

"...demands the immediate cessation of such aggressive acts against an ally, and urges the Syrian regime to put an end to flagrant violations of international law..."

And on 9 October 2012, NATO Secretary-General Anders Fogh Rasmussen reported that NATO completed making plans to defend Turkey from Syrian attack. Soon after by 12 December, MIM-104 Patriot missiles from Netherlands, Germany, and the U.S. were deployed in Turkish territory as part of Operation Active Fence.

== See also ==
- List of border conflicts
- Israeli–Syrian ceasefire line incidents during the Syrian civil war
- Operation Active Fence
- Syria–Turkey relations
- Turkey–ISIL conflict
