= 2012 Turkish F-4 Phantom shootdown =

Shootdown over the border between Syria and Turkey

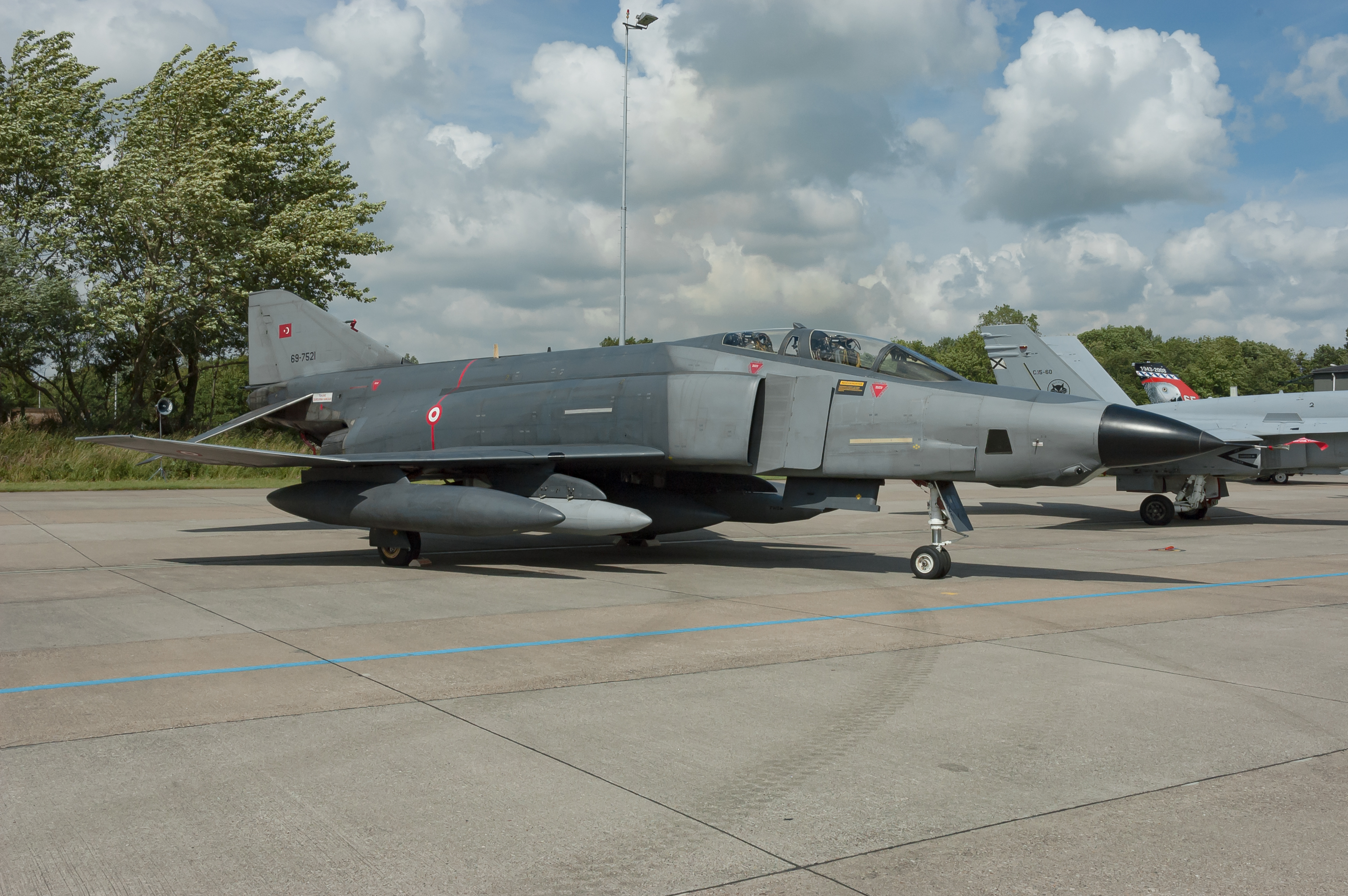
- An RF-4E Phantom II of the Turkish Air Force, similar to the one involved

Shootdown
- Date: 22 June 2012
- Summary: Shootdown by Syrian Army anti-aircraft fire
- Site: Syria–Turkey border; 35.8335°N 35.5099°E

Aircraft
- Aircraft type: McDonnell Douglas RF-4E Phantom II
- Operator: Turkish Air Force
- Registration: 77-0314
- Flight origin: Erhaç Air Base
- Occupants: 2
- Crew: 2
- Fatalities: 2
- Survivors: 0

On 22 June 2012, a Turkish McDonnell Douglas RF-4E Phantom II reconnaissance jet was intercepted and shot down by the Syrian Army in international airspace, after having violated Syrian airspace. The jet's pilots were killed; both Turkish and Syrian forces searched for them before recovering their bodies in early July. The incident was part of a series of incidents between Turkey and Syria since the beginning of the Syrian Civil War and greatly escalated the tensions between the two countries.

== Background ==
Turkey (orange) has been involved in the Syrian civil war since 2011

Syria–Turkey relations were already marred by the Turkish pilgrim bus attack. Also, on 9 April 2012, the Syrian envoy to Turkey was summoned after Syrian forces fired across the Syria–Turkey border. At least two people were killed and many others injured in the incident.

== Event ==
The reconnaissance aircraft of type RF-4E belonged to the 173rd Wing at the 7th Main Jet Base Group Command stationed at the Erhaç Air Base in Malatya.

The aircraft, piloted by Flight lieutenant Gökhan Ertan and Flying officer Hasan Hüseyin Aksoy, took off on 22 June 2012 with the task to help test the Turkish radar system. According to radar records, the aircraft was flying between Cyprus and Hatay over the Mediterranean Sea at about FL210, an altitude of 21,000 feet (6,400 m), at 11:06 hours local time (08:06 UTC). For radar test purposes, it descended as it approached Hatay. At 11:14 hours, the RF-4E was at 8600 ft, and nine minutes later it had descended to 7500 ft just over Hatay. At 11:23 hours, the aircraft changed its course, heading now for the Mediterranean Sea and continued to descend. At 11:37, it had reached 2000 ft and was descending further for radar test purposes. The aircraft arrived at 11:42 on the boundary of Syrian sovereign airspace, 12 nmi (22 km) out from the coastline, flying at 200 ft.

At this point, the aircraft violated Syrian airspace, and flew around for five minutes within its airspace. A Turkish radar base controlling the flight warned the RF-4E to change its course immediately and leave that airspace. At 11:47, it left Syrian airspace and took a northerly course in the direction of Hatay, ascending to FL030. During the airspace violation and afterwards, the aircraft received no warning or admonishment from Syrian military authorities. The pilots changed their course once again into the Mediterranean Sea to proceed with their mission of radar testing. At 11:50, the pilots asked the Turkish radar base for assistance on route information, so that they would not violate Syrian airspace again. The aircraft was flying in international airspace and visible on radar screens until 12:02.

The RF-4E was struck by a Syrian surface-to-air missile off the coast. The aircrew may have been alerted to a missile approaching and attempted unsuccessfully to evade. It was the first time that any variant of the F-4 had been shot down since the 1991 Gulf War.

== Aftermath ==
The navies of Turkey and Syria searched for the missing aircraft and crew.

United States research vessel EV Nautilus arrived three days later at the crash site to join the search and rescue operations. Her two remotely operated vehicles Hercules and Argus conducted a search at the seabed in 1,280 m (4,200 ft) depth and located the debris of the aircraft, and brought parts of the downed jet up to the surface. The bodies of the pilots were brought up with the ship's crane by Turkish divers in a 45-minute operation on 4 July 2012.

The Syrian military alleged that the fighter aircraft had violated Syrian airspace. Turkish president Abdullah Gül and other spokesmen did not confirm this, though Gül said that "it is routine for jet fighters to sometimes fly in and out over [national] borders".

Gül stated that "it is not possible to cover over a thing like this. Whatever is necessary will no doubt be done." A Turkish political party leader claimed that the jet had been shot down by a Russian warship, and Deputy Prime Minister Bülent Arınç also claimed that it was hit by a laser-guided or heat-seeking missile, not anti-aircraft fire as the Syrian Government claimed.

On 3 July 2012, the Syrian president Bashar al-Assad said that he regretted the incident and would not allow any open conflict with Turkey.

The change in Turkey's policy towards Syrian attacks led to a series of border clashes in October.

== See also ==
- List of accidents and incidents involving military aircraft (2010–2019)
- 2015 Russian Sukhoi Su-24 shootdown
- 1983 Turkish F-100 shootdown
