= Christopher Minto =

American wrestler (2004)

Personal information
- Native name: Christopher Minto
- Full name: Christopher Basil Minto
- Born: September 13, 2004 (age 22) Florida, U.S.
- Home town: Cape Coral, Florida, U.S.
- Height: 5 ft 10 in (178 cm)
- Weight: 79 kg (174 lb)

Sport
- Sport: Wrestling
- Weight class: 79 kg
- Events: Freestyle and Folkstyle
- College team: Nebraska
- Club: Nebraska Wrestling Training Center
- Coached by: Mark Manning
Medal record
Men's collegiate wrestling
Representing the Nebraska Cornhuskers
NCAA Division I Championships
Silver medal – second place	2026 Cleveland	174 lb
Big Ten Championships
Silver medal – second place	2026 State College	174 lb

Christopher Basil Minto (born September 13, 2004) is a freestyle wrestler and graduated folkstyle wrestler who competes at 79kg

== Background ==
Minto is from a wrestling family, as his older brothers were high school state placers and Junior College All-Americans.

== Folkstyle career ==
=== High school ===
During his high school wrestling years, Minto won three state titles at Mariner High School in Cape Coral, Florida.

=== College ===
In collegiate wrestling, Minto competes for the Nebraska Cornhuskers and is currently a two–time NCAA Division I All–American.

== Freestyle career ==
In May 2026, Minto signed to compete with Real American Freestyle, at RAF 09 on May 30, 2026 in Dallas, Texas. He lost to Jason Nolf by decision. This fight earned him a Match of the Night award.

Minto faced Keegan O'Toole on July 18, 2026 at RAF 11 and lost by decision.

Born in the United States and having Jamaican ancestry, Minto was able to represent either the United States or Jamaica internationally. In October 2026, he chose to represent Jamaica internationally at the 2026 UWW u23 World Championships in Las Vegas, Nevada, where he finished in 5th place at 79kg in Men's freestyle.

== Freestyle record ==
Senior Freestyle Matches
Res.	Record	Opponent	Score	Date	Event	Location
Loss	3-4	(Japan) Kanata YAMAGUCHI	0 - 10	October 18, 2026	2026 U23 World Wrestling Championships	(United States) Las Vegas, Nevada
Win	3-3	(Kazakhstan) Yerkhan Abil	6 - 3	October 18, 2026	2026 U23 World Wrestling Championships	(United States) Las Vegas, Nevada
Win	2-3	(Germany) Stas Wolf	12 - 1	October 18, 2026	2026 U23 World Wrestling Championships	(United States) Las Vegas, Nevada
Loss	1-3	(Russia) Said Saidulov	3-13	October 17, 2026	2026 U23 World Wrestling Championships	(United States) Las Vegas, Nevada
Win	1-2	(Israel) Omer Barak	14-4	October 17, 2026	2026 U23 World Wrestling Championships	(United States) Las Vegas, Nevada
Loss	0-2	(United States) Keegan O'Toole	9-14	July 18, 2026	RAF 11	(United States) Milwaukee, Wisconsin
Loss	0-1	(United States) Jason Nolf	5-10	May 30, 2026	RAF 09	(United States) Dallas, Texas
