= Keegan O'Toole =

American wrestler (born 2001)

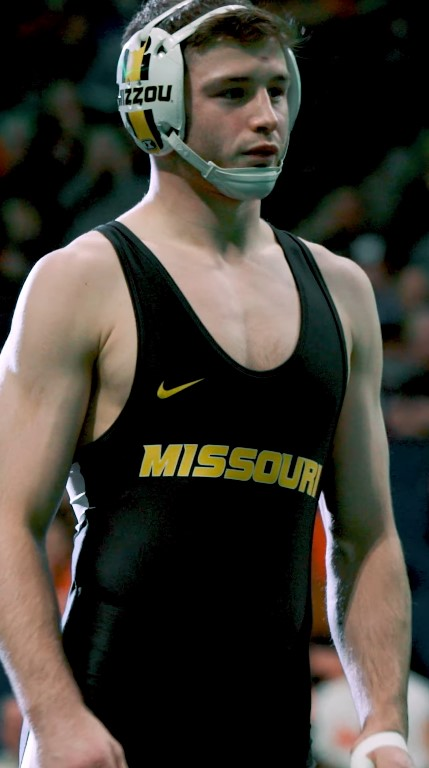
- O'Toole in 2024

Personal information
- Full name: Keegan Daniel O'Toole
- Born: May 9, 2001 (age 25) Hartland, Wisconsin, U.S.
- Height: 6 ft (183 cm)

Sport
- Country: United States
- Sport: Wrestling
- Weight class: 74 kg (163 lb)
- Events: Freestyle and Folkstyle
- College team: Missouri Tigers
- Club: Askren Wrestling Academy
- Coached by: Ben Askren
Medal record
Men's freestyle wrestling
Representing the United States
U23 World Championships
Gold medal – first place	2023 Tirana	74 kg
U20 World Championships
Gold medal – first place	2021 Ufa	74 kg
Men's collegiate wrestling
Representing the Missouri Tigers
NCAA Division I Championships
Gold medal – first place	2022 Detroit	165 lb
Gold medal – first place	2023 Tulsa	165 lb
Silver medal – second place	2025 Philadelphia	174 lb
Bronze medal – third place	2021 St. Louis	165 lb
Bronze medal – third place	2024 Kansas City	165 lb
Big 12 Championships
Gold medal – first place	2022 Tulsa	165 lb
Gold medal – first place	2024 Tulsa	165 lb
Gold medal – first place	2025 Tulsa	174 lb
Silver medal – second place	2023 Tulsa	165 lb
MAC Championships
Gold medal – first place	2021 Trenton	165 lb

Keegan Daniel O'Toole (born May 9, 2001) is an American freestyle and folkstyle wrestler who competes at 74 kilograms. In freestyle, he was the 2023 U23 World Champion and the 2021 U20 World Champion. In folkstyle, he is a two-time NCAA Division I national champion out of the University of Missouri.

== Career ==
=== Early life ===
Born and raised in the state of Wisconsin, O'Toole attended Arrowhead High School in Hartland, Wisconsin, graduating in 2020 as the second-ranked recruit in the nation. During his time as a high school wrestler, O'Toole went on to become the eighteenth athlete to claim four WIAA state titles, going 49–0 as a senior. He was the top-ranked wrestler at 160 pounds in 2019. Before attending the University of Missouri, he was named the Junior Dan Hodge Trophy and Wisconsin's Dave Schultz High School Excellence award winner.

=== University of Missouri ===
==== 2020–2021 ====
Before the season started, O'Toole claimed the U20 US National championship in freestyle.

A true freshman, O'Toole racked up a 9–0 record in dual meets during regular season, competing solely along the Mid-American Conference due to COVID-19 restrictions. After claiming the Conference title, O'Toole competed at the NCAA tournament, where after making the quarterfinals, he was knocked into consolations by eventual finalist and third-seeded Jake Wentzel from Pittsburgh. He then notably stunned second-ranked Anthony Valencia from ASU by technical fall and fifth-ranked Zach Hartman from Bucknell by major decision before claiming third-place with a win over tenth-seeded Travis Wittlake from the Oklahoma State University, becoming an All-American and closing out the year at 19–1.

O'Toole repeated as the U20 US national champion, and then claimed the U20 world championship with a technical fall in the final, pinning 2020 Olympian and 2019 U23 World Champion Turan Bayramov in the quarterfinals.

==== 2021–2022 ====
Back to folkstyle, O'Toole racked up a Southern Scuffle title and a 12–0 record in dual meets during regular season, before making his Big 12 Conference debut and claiming the conference title. At the NCAA tournament, O'Toole, the second seed, took out returning All-Americans Anthony Valencia and Cameron Amine to make the finals, where he edged returning NCAA champion Shane Griffith to become an NCAA champion and close out the year undefeated at 25–0. After the season, he was named the Big 12 Wrestler of the Year.

==== 2022–2023 ====
The returning national champion, O'Toole won the Tiger Invite title and compiled a 9–1 dual meet record during regular season, with a lone loss to fellow U20 World and NCAA champion David Carr, who had bumped up from 157 pounds to 165 pounds. He claimed runner-up honors at the Big 12 Championships, losing the rematch to Carr in the finals. At the NCAA championships, O'Toole defeated All-Americans Wyatt Sheets, Carson Kharchla, and two-timer Cameron Amine to cruise to the finals, where he upset Carr by decision, becoming a two-time NCAA champion.

Fresh off an NCAA championship, O'Toole returned to freestyle and made his senior-level debut at the US Open National Championships in April. After a 3–0 stint, O'Toole fell to three-time NCAA champion and returning national champion Jason Nolf in the semifinals before winning his next two matches to claim third place. In June, he earned a forfeit victory against fellow two-time NCAA champion Vincenzo Joseph for third place in the US World Team Trials at Final X and was named to the U23 US World Team.

At the U23 World Championships, O'Toole defeated returning U23 World medalist Vadym Kurylenko, U23 European finalist Krisztian Biro, and U17 World medalist Imam Ganishov in the finals to become the U23 World champion.

==== 2023–2024 ====
Back to folkstyle, O'Toole won the Tiger Invite and went 12–0 in dual meets before becoming a two-time Big 12 champion, with a win in the finals over three-time All-American David Carr to tie the series at 2–2. At the NCAA tournament, O'Toole, the top seed, cruised to the semifinals with three consecutive pins, where he was upset by Carr and fell into the consolation bracket. He then defeated his next two opponents to place third and become a four-time All-American, closing out the year at 24–1.

== Freestyle record ==
Senior Freestyle Matches
Res.	Record	Opponent	Score	Date	Event	Location
Win	14–4	(United States) Christopher Minto	14–9	July 18, 2026	RAF 11	(United States) Milwaukee, Wisconsin
Win	13–4	(Uzbekistan) Bekzod Abdurakhmonov	10–6	June 13, 2026	RAF 10	(United States) St. Louis, Missouri
Loss	12–4	(Slovakia) Tajmuraz Salkazanov	0–9	February 28, 2026	RAF 06	(United States) Tempe, Arizona
2024 World Team Trials at 79kg
Loss	12–3	(United States) Levi Haines	0–6	September 14–15, 2024	2024 US World Team Trials	(United States) Lincoln, Nebraska
Loss	12–2	(United States) Chance Marsteller	0–7	September 14–15, 2024	2024 US World Team Trials	(United States) Lincoln, Nebraska
Win	12–1	(United States) David Carr	9–4	September 14–15, 2024	2024 US World Team Trials	(United States) Lincoln, Nebraska
Win	11–1	(United States) Andrew Dickson	TF 11–0	September 14–15, 2024	2024 US World Team Trials	(United States) Lincoln, Nebraska
2023 U23 World Championships (gold) at 74 kg
Win	10–1	(Russia) Imam Ganishov	6–1	October 23–24, 2023	2023 U23 World Championships	Tirana, Albania
Win	9–1	(Puerto Rico) Sonny Santiago	Fall	October 23–24, 2023	2023 U23 World Championships	Tirana, Albania
Win	8–1	(Japan) Hikaru Takata	10–1	October 23–24, 2023	2023 U23 World Championships	Tirana, Albania
Win	7–1	(Romania) Krisztian Biro	TF 12–2	October 23–24, 2023	2023 U23 World Championships	Tirana, Albania
Win	6–1	(Ukraine) Vadym Kurylenko	TF 10–0	October 23–24, 2023	2023 U23 World Championships	Tirana, Albania
2023 US World Team Trials (bronze) at 74 kg
Win		(United States) Vincenzo Joseph	FF	June 10, 2023	2023 Final X Newark	(United States) Newark, New Jersey
2023 US Open (bronze) at 74 kg
Win	5–1	(United States) Josh Shields	10–2	April 26–30, 2023	2023 US Open National Championships	(United States) Las Vegas, Nevada
Win	4–1	(United States) Collin Purinton	TF 10–0	April 26–30, 2023	2023 US Open National Championships	(United States) Las Vegas, Nevada
Loss	3–1	(United States) Jason Nolf	2–9	April 26–30, 2023	2023 US Open National Championships	(United States) Las Vegas, Nevada
Win	3–0	(United States) Thomas Gantt	TF 10–0	April 26–30, 2023	2023 US Open National Championships	(United States) Las Vegas, Nevada
Win	2–0	(United States) Loranzo Rajaonarivelo	TF 12–2	April 26–30, 2023	2023 US Open National Championships	(United States) Las Vegas, Nevada
Win	1–0	(United States) Brandon Murray	TF 10–0	April 26–30, 2023	2023 US Open National Championships	(United States) Las Vegas, Nevada
