= North Atlantic Treaty =

1949 treaty forming the basis of NATO

Washington Treaty
North Atlantic Treaty
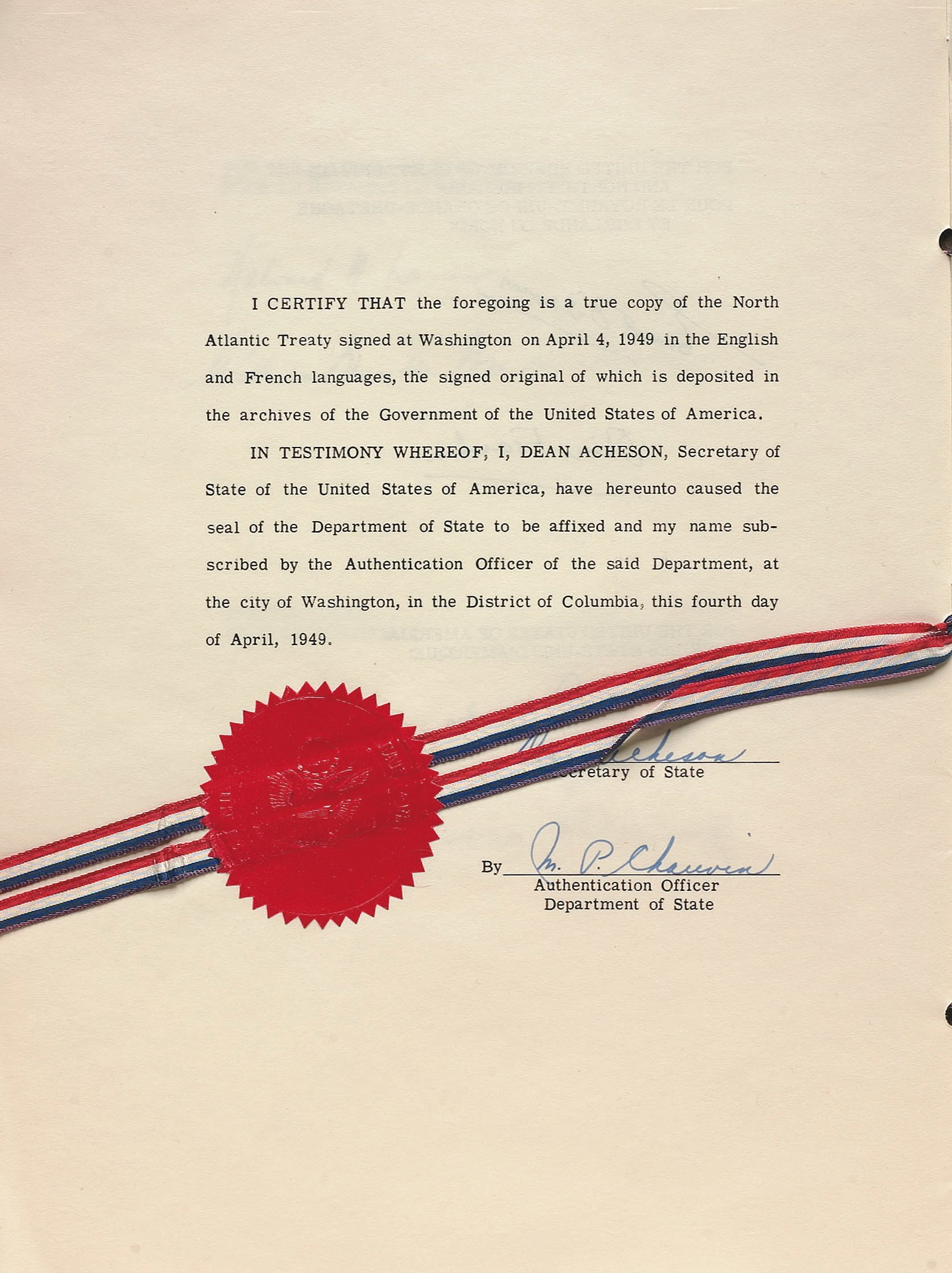
- North Atlantic Treaty authentication page
- Type: Military alliance
- Location: Washington, D.C.
- Effective: 24 August 1949; 77 years ago
- Condition: Ratification by the majority of the signatories including Belgium, Canada, France, Luxembourg, the Netherlands, the United Kingdom, and the United States
- Parties: 32: Albania; Belgium; Bulgaria; Canada; Croatia; Czechia; Denmark; Estonia; Finland; France; Germany; Greece; Hungary; Iceland; Italy; Latvia; Lithuania; Luxembourg; Montenegro; Netherlands; North Macedonia; Norway; Poland; Portugal; Romania; Slovakia; Slovenia; Spain; Sweden; Turkey; United Kingdom; United States
- Depositary: Government of the United States of America
- Languages: English, French

Full text
- North Atlantic Treaty at Wikisource

The North Atlantic Treaty, also known as the Washington Treaty, forms the legal basis of, and is implemented by, the North Atlantic Treaty Organization (NATO). The treaty was signed in Washington, D.C., on 4 April 1949.

== Background ==
The treaty was signed in Washington, D.C., on 4 April 1949 by a committee which was chaired by US diplomat Theodore Achilles. Earlier secret talks had been held at the Pentagon between 22 March and 1 April 1948, of which Achilles said:

The talks lasted about two weeks and by the time they finished, it had been secretly agreed that there would be a treaty, and I had a draft of one in the bottom drawer of my safe. It was never shown to anyone except Jack [Hickerson]. I wish I had kept it, but when I left the Department in 1950, I dutifully left it in the safe and I have never been able to trace it in the archives. It drew heavily on the Rio Treaty, and a bit of the Brussels Treaty, which had not yet been signed, but of which we were being kept heavily supplied with drafts. The eventual North Atlantic Treaty had the general form, and a good bit of the language of my first draft, but with a number of important differences.

According to Achilles, another important author of the treaty was John D. Hickerson:

More than any human being Jack was responsible for the nature, content, and form of the Treaty...It was a one-man Hickerson treaty.

As a fundamental component of NATO, the North Atlantic Treaty is a product of the US' desire to avoid overextension at the end of World War II, and consequently pursue multilateralism in Europe. It is part of the US' collective defense arrangement with Western European powers, following a long and deliberative process. The treaty was created with an armed attack by the Soviet Union against Western Europe in mind, although the mutual self-defense clause was never invoked during the Cold War.

By signing the North Atlantic Treaty, parties are "determined to safeguard the freedom, common heritage and civilization of the peoples, founded on the principles of democracy, individual liberty and the rule of law."

== Members ==
=== Founding members ===
The following twelve states signed the treaty and thus became the founding members of NATO. The following leaders signed the agreement as plenipotentiaries of their countries in Washington, D.C., on 4 April 1949:

- Belgium – Prime Minister and Foreign Minister Paul-Henri Spaak and Ambassador Baron Robert Silvercruys
- Canada – Secretary of State for External Affairs Lester B. Pearson and Ambassador H. H. Wrong
- Denmark – Foreign Minister Gustav Rasmussen and Ambassador Henrik Kauffmann
- France – Foreign Minister Robert Schuman and Ambassador Henri Bonnet
- Iceland – Foreign Minister Bjarni Benediktsson and Ambassador Thor Thors
- Italy – Foreign Minister Carlo Sforza and Ambassador Alberto Tarchiani
- Luxembourg – Foreign Minister Joseph Bech and Ambassador Hugues Le Gallais
- Netherlands – Foreign Minister Dirk Stikker and Ambassador Eelco van Kleffens
- Norway – Foreign Minister Halvard M. Lange and Ambassador Wilhelm von Munthe af Morgenstierne
- Portugal – Foreign Minister José Caeiro da Mata and Ambassador Pedro Teotónio Pereira
- United Kingdom – Foreign Secretary Ernest Bevin and Ambassador Oliver Franks
- United States – Secretary of State Dean Acheson

=== Non-founding members who joined before the dissolution of the Soviet Union ===
Animated map of NATO membership over time

The following four states joined the treaty after the 12 founding states, but before the dissolution of the Soviet Union:

- Greece (joined in 1952) (Note: Joined as Kingdom of Greece.)
- Turkey (joined in 1952)
- West Germany (joined in 1955) (Note: Joined as West Germany. After reunification in 1990, the former East German territory became covered by NATO protection.)
- Spain (joined in 1982)

=== Members who joined after the dissolution of the Soviet Union ===
The following 16 states joined the treaty after the dissolution of the Soviet Union:

- Czech Republic (joined in 1999)
- Hungary (joined in 1999)
- Poland (joined in 1999)
- Bulgaria (joined in 2004)
- Estonia (joined in 2004)
- Latvia (joined in 2004)
- Lithuania (joined in 2004)
- Romania (joined in 2004)
- Slovakia (joined in 2004)
- Slovenia (joined in 2004)
- Albania (joined in 2009)
- Croatia (joined in 2009)
- Montenegro (joined in 2017)
- North Macedonia (joined in 2020)
- Finland (joined in 2023)
- Sweden (joined in 2024)

=== Withdrawal ===
No state has rescinded its membership, but some dependencies and jurisdictions of member states that had prior NATO mutual defense protection under Article 6 have not requested membership after becoming independent or handed over to non-NATO states, e.g.:

- Cyprus (independence from the United Kingdom in 1960)
- Algeria (independence from France in 1962)
- Malta (independence from the United Kingdom in 1964)
- The Bahamas north of the Tropic of Cancer (independence from the United Kingdom in 1973)
- Belize (independence from the United Kingdom in 1981)

== Provisions ==
=== Article 1 ===
Article 1 of the treaty states that member parties "settle any international disputes in which they may be involved by peaceful means in such a manner that international peace and security, and justice, are not endangered, and to refrain in their international relations from the threat or use of force in any manner inconsistent with the purposes of the United Nations."

Members seek to promote stability and well-being in the North Atlantic area through preservation of peace and security in accordance with the Charter of the United Nations.

=== Article 2 ===
Article 2 of the treaty stipulates that "The Parties will contribute toward the further development of peaceful and friendly international relations by strengthening their free institutions, by bringing about a better understanding of the principles upon which these institutions are founded, and by promoting conditions of stability and well-being. They will seek to eliminate conflict in their international economic policies and will encourage economic collaboration between any or all of them." This is sometimes referred to as the Canada Clause after Pearson pushed for its inclusion in the treaty. This included proposals for a trade council, cultural program, technological sharing, and an information program. Of those, only the latter two were passed. Nonetheless, it has been brought up by observers commenting on trade disputes between members.

=== Article 3 ===
Article 3 of the treaty states that "In order more effectively to achieve the objectives of this Treaty, the Parties, separately and jointly, by means of continuous and effective self-help and mutual aid, will maintain and develop their individual and collective capacity to resist armed attack."

Article 3 has been cited as a basis for NATO's defence investments commitments. The guideline of spending at least 2% of gross domestic product on defence was establish in 2006 and reinforced through the 2014 Wales Defence Investment Pledge. At the 2023 Vilnius Summit, NATO members reaffirmed their commitment to spending at least 2% of GDP annually on defence.

At the 2025 Hague Summit, member states agreed to a new commitment to invest 5% of GDP annually of defence and security-related spending by 2035, explicitly linking the commitment to their obligations under Article 3. This consists of at least 3.5% of GDP for core defence requirements, including critical infrastructure protection, civil preparedness, resilience and defence industrial development.

NATO has increasingly emphasized Article 3 as a foundation for organizing the Alliance's collective resilience and deterrence efforts. Although NATO's engagement in civil emergency planning dates back to 1952, the integration of civilian preparedness and societal resilience into its broader defence strategy has become increasingly prominent since Russia's annexation of Crimea in 204 and its subsequent invasion of Ukraine in 2022. NATO uses several different concepts to advance the focus on civil dimensions, resources and actors, such as "whole-of government", "whole-of-society", 360 approach. This is often motivated from the perspective of grey-zone IR politics and the increased presence of hybrid threats and hybrid warfare. A key policy concept in this effort is resilience. In 2022 the Senior Civil Emergency Committee, originally established in 1955 was renamed the Resilience committee. Recent academic analysis that have traced the development of article 3 for 75 years noted that traditional notions of civil defense and civil emergency planning, aiming at protection of civil population has now been replaced by a stronger emphasize on active social participation of societal actors, populations and individuals.

It has also been used as a core concept for a mandate to strengthen member resilience: the ability to resist and recover from major disasters, failures in infrastructure, or traditional armed attack. This commitment was first accepted during the 2016 Warsaw summit, and further reiterated and clarified due to the COVID-19 pandemic in 2021. In accordance with NATO documents, this has been understood to include seven key areas:

- Continuity of government during a crisis
- Energy and power grid infrastructure resilience
- Immigration control
- Food and water security
- Medical emergencies
- Resilient civil communications
- Effective transportation networks

=== Article 4 ===
Article 4 is generally considered the starting point for major NATO operations, and therefore is intended for either emergencies or situations of urgency. It officially calls for consultation over military matters when "the territorial integrity, political independence or security of any of the parties is threatened." Upon its invocation, the issue is discussed in the North Atlantic Council, and can formally lead into a joint decision or action (logistic, military, or otherwise) on behalf of the Alliance.

==== Invocations ====
It has been invoked nine times as of 19 September 2025.

Article 4 invocations
Nations	Date	Reason	Outcome
Turkey	February 2003	Iraq War	Operation Display Deterrence
Turkey	June 2012	Shootdown of a Turkish military jet by Syria	Operation Active Fence
Turkey	October 2012	Syrian forces shelling Turkish cities	Operation Active Fence
Latvia; Lithuania; Poland	March 2014	Russian annexation of Crimea	Deployment of forces in the Black Sea by Romania, Bulgaria, and Turkey; Aid to the Ukrainian government Creation of NATO Enhanced Forward Presence
Turkey	July 2015	2015 Suruç bombing by ISIS; Other security issues along its southern border	Main article: 2015 NATO emergency meeting Denunciation of the attack and reassessment of NATO assets in Turkey
Turkey	February 2020	Increasing tensions as part of the Northwestern Syria offensive Syrian and Russian airstrikes on Turkish troops	Augmentation of Turkish air defences
Bulgaria; Czech Republic; Estonia; Latvia; Lithuania; Poland; Romania; Slovakia	February 2022	Russian invasion of Ukraine	See also: 2022 Brussels summit Defensive build-up Matériel support to Ukraine; Activation of the NATO Response Force
Poland	September 2025	Russian drone incursion into Poland	Operation Eastern Sentry
Estonia	September 2025	Incursion of Russian fighter jets into Estonian airspace	Operation Eastern Sentry

==== Threatened invocations ====
There have also been instances where Article 4 was not formally invoked, but instead threatened. In fact, this was viewed as one of the original intentions for Article 4: as a means to elevate issues and provide member nations a means of deterrence. For example, in November 2021, the Polish foreign ministry—along with Estonia, Lithuania, and Latvia—briefly considered triggering Article 4 due to the Belarusian migrant crisis, but it was not formally requested. On 28 December 2024, Swedish member of parliament and former minister of defense, Peter Hultqvist wanted the government to activate Article 4 in response to the 2024 Baltic Sea submarine cable disruptions and in September 2025, Denmark also considered it after unauthorised drone flights over airports and military bases in the country.

=== Article 5 ===
The key section of the treaty is Article 5. Its commitment clause defines the casus foederis. It commits each member state to consider an armed attack against one member state, in the areas defined by Article 6, to be an armed attack against them all. Upon such attack, each member state is to assist by taking "such action as [the member state] deems necessary, including the use of armed force, to restore and maintain the security of the North Atlantic area." The article has only been invoked once, but considered in a number of other cases.

==== Invocations ====
===== September 11 attacks =====
Article 5 has been invoked only once in NATO history, after the September 11 attacks on the United States in 2001. Following the September 11 attacks, the Secretary General of NATO, George Robertson telephoned Colin Powell and said that declaring an Article 5 contingency would be a useful political statement for NATO to make. The United States indicated it had no interest in making such a request itself; however, it would not object to the council taking such action on its own.

==== Threatened invocations ====
Article 5 threats
Party	Date	Reason
Turkey	June 2012	Main article: 2012 Turkish F-4 Phantom shootdown The downing of an "unarmed" Turkish military jet which was "13 sea miles" from Syria over "international waters" on a "solo mission to test domestic radar systems". On 25 June, the Turkish Deputy Prime Minister said that he intended to raise Article 5.
Turkey	August 2012	Main article: Tomb of Suleyman Shah § Events during the Syrian Civil War Recep Tayyip Erdoğan stated that "The tomb of Suleyman Shah [in Syria] and the land surrounding it is our territory. We cannot ignore any unfavorable act against that monument, as it would be an attack on our territory, as well as an attack on NATO land... Everyone knows his duty, and will continue to do what is necessary".
United Kingdom; United States	August 2022	Main article: Zaporizhzhia Nuclear Power Plant crisis Chair of the Defence Select Committee of the United Kingdom Tobias Ellwood said that any deliberate attack against the Zaporizhzhia Nuclear Power Plant in Ukraine that could cause radiation leaks would be a breach of Article 5. This statement was released over fears that a nuclear catastrophe could occur in the Russian-occupied plant during the 2022 Russian invasion of Ukraine. The next day, American congressman Adam Kinzinger said that any radiation leak into NATO countries would kill people, which would be an automatic activation of Article 5.
Albania	October 2022	Main article: Albania–Iran relations § Cyberattack and severed ties Albanian prime minister Edi Rama revealed that his government had considered invoking Article 5 in response to a major cyberattack on 15 July 2022 targeting critical and government infrastructure, widely believed to have been carried out on behalf of Iran by state–affiliated cybercriminals.
Denmark	January 2026	Main article: Greenland crisis During the second Trump administration the American campaign to seize Greenland or pressure Denmark to give it up under Donald Trump was initially referred to as the "Greenland crisis".

=== Article 6 ===
Current NATO member territory per Article 6

Article 6 states that Article 5 covers only member states' territories in Europe, North America, Turkey, and islands in the Atlantic north of the Tropic of Cancer.

A clarification regarding the territories to which Article 5 applies was issued by Article 2 of the Protocol to the North Atlantic Treaty on the accession of Greece and Turkey signed on 22 October 1951. Subsequent expansions, such as to West Germany in 1955, were treated in the same way. A further clarification was made in a NAC meeting on July 3, 1962 that Algeria (which was explicitly included in the original text as "Algerian departments of France") was no longer included.

In 1954, following India's annexation of Dadra and Nagar Haveli, the Portuguese government was precluded from invoking Article 5 due to Article 6, but it was understood at the time that Article 4 could be invoked.

It was the opinion in August 1965 of the US State Department, the US Defense Department, and the legal division of NATO that an attack on the North Pacific U.S. island state of Hawaii would not trigger the treaty, but an attack on the other 49 would. The Aleutian Islands in the North Pacific are not treated in the same manner by NATO as Hawaii is, since they are politically part of Alaska rather than their own state like Hawaii, and considered geographically part of North America, while Hawaii is not. Similarly, Mediterranean islands like Sicily, Corsica, the Baleares, etc. are considered geographically part of Europe, and therefore under Article 6. However, even though islands like Puerto Rico are considered part of North America, they do not fall under NATO because specifically those islands that are in the Atlantic have to be north of the Tropic of Cancer. The Spanish cities of Ceuta and Melilla on the North African shore are not under NATO protection in spite of Moroccan claims to them. Legal experts have interpreted that other articles could cover the Spanish North African cities but this take has not been tested in practice. This is also why events such as the Balyun airstrikes did not trigger Article 5, as the Turkish troops that were attacked were in Syria, not Turkey. As well as why the 1982 invasion of the Falkland Islands by Argentina did not trigger Article 5, as the Falkland Islands are in the South Atlantic, south of the Tropic of Cancer, and not within the geographic area covered by Article 6.

On 16 April 2003, NATO agreed to take command of the International Security Assistance Force (ISAF) in Afghanistan, which includes troops from 42 countries. The decision came at the request of Germany and the Netherlands, the two states leading ISAF at the time of the agreement, and all nineteen NATO ambassadors approved it unanimously. The handover of control to NATO took place on 11 August, and marked the first time in NATO's history that it took charge of a mission outside of the area delineated by Article 6.

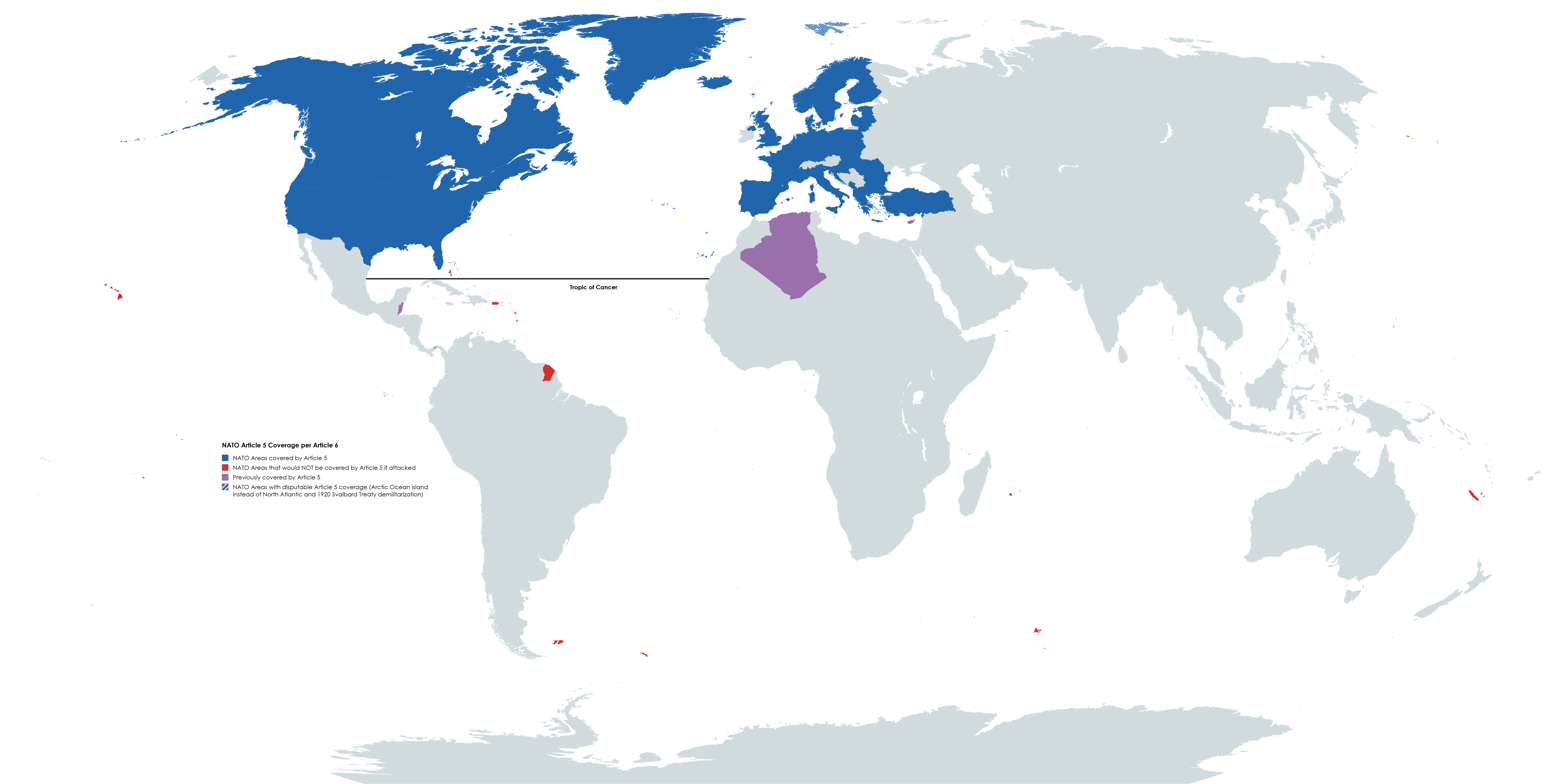
Article 5 mutual defense clause activation eligibility per language of the Article 6. Areas of NATO countries without mutual defense coverage in red. Historical Article 5 coverage in purple.

=== Article 7 ===
Article 7 states that the North Atlantic Treaty shall not be interpreted as affecting in any way the rights and obligations of member countries under the charter of the United Nations, or the primary responsibility of the United Nations Security Council for the maintenance of international peace and security.

=== Article 8 ===
Article 8 is one of the more rarely referenced provisions of the North Atlantic Treaty. It regulates the relationship between the obligations of the NATO members under the treaty and other obligations of the allied nations (among themselves or with third parties). According to Article 8, members should not have any international commitments in conflict with the treaty, and undertake not to enter into any international "engagement" in conflict with the treaty. The following is a list of such active, intra-NATO military treaties.

Intra-NATO Military Treaties
Since	Members	Name
1373	Portugal; United Kingdom	Anglo-Portuguese Treaty of 1373
1940	Canada; United States	Ogdensburg Agreement
1958	United Kingdom; United States	US–UK Mutual Defence Agreement
1972	Netherlands; United Kingdom	United Kingdom/Netherlands Amphibious Force (UK/NL AF)
2010	France; United Kingdom	Lancaster House Treaties
2019	Greece; United States	Mutual Defense Cooperation Agreement
2020	France; Germany	Aachen Treaty
2021	France; Greece	Franco-Greek defence agreement
2022	Finland; United Kingdom	UK-Finland Defence Agreement
2022	Sweden; United Kingdom	UK-Sweden Defence Agreement
2023	Greece; United Kingdom	Anglo-Greek Defence Agreement
2023	Sweden; United States	Sweden–United States Defense Cooperation Agreement
2023	Finland; United States	Finland–United States Defense Cooperation Agreement
2023	Denmark; United States	Denmark–United States Defense Cooperation Agreement
2024	Germany; United Kingdom	Joint Declaration on Enhanced Defence Cooperation between Germany and the United Kingdom

=== Article 9 ===
Establishes the North Atlantic Council, and is the only NATO body that derives its authority directly from the treaty. Its primary objectives as stated in the treaty is the enforcement of Article 3 and Article 5.

The article also empowers the Council to establish subsidiary bodies as necessary and specifically directed it to create a defence committee to recommend measures for implementing Articles 3 and 5.

=== Article 10 ===
Article 10 dictates the process by which other countries may join NATO, which is by unanimous agreement by current NATO members. Further, new NATO members can only consist of other European nations. In practice, this has turned into a set of action plans which an aspiring nation must follow in order to become a member, including the Membership Action Plan (MAP) mechanism and Intensified Dialogue formula.

=== Article 11 ===
Article 11 indicated the process of the initial ratification of the treaty. Each signatory nation was required to ratify the treaty through their respective constitutional processes. In order to come into force, the treaty had to be ratified by Belgium, Canada, France, Luxembourg, the Netherlands, the United Kingdom, and the United States.

=== Article 12 ===
Article 12 states the process by which the treaty may be amended, provided such amendments still affect the North Atlantic area and do not violate the Charter of the United Nations. In practice, this has only been used to clearly delineate which territories are under the purview of NATO.

=== Article 13 ===
Article 13 delimits the process by which a member leaves NATO, which simply consists of a one-year notice by the member nation to the U.S. government in its role as the treaty depositary, which then promulgates the notice to the other member nations. This has been contemplated by a number of member nations, but so far has not happened aside from withdrawals due to independence of former territories or dependencies (namely, Algeria, Malta, and Cyprus).

Otherwise, the next closest option for a member nation is to instead withdraw from NATO's military command structure, but not from NATO entirely. This happened with France in 1966, which rejoined in 2009; and with Greece in 1974, which rejoined in 1980 after the new Turkish military government ended its objections to Greek re-entry.

=== Article 14 ===
Article 14 notes the official languages of NATO as English and French, and that the United States government shall promulgate copies of the treaty to the other member nations.

=== Changes since signing ===
Three official footnotes have been released to reflect the changes made since the treaty was written:

Regarding Article 6:

- The definition of the territories to which Article 5 applies was revised by Article 2 of the Protocol to the North Atlantic Treaty on the accession of Greece and Turkey signed on 22 October 1951.

Regarding Article 6:

- On 16 January 1963, the North Atlantic Council noted that insofar as the former Algerian Departments of France were concerned, the relevant clauses of this Treaty had become inapplicable as from 3 July 1962.

Regarding Article 11:

- The Treaty came into force on 24 August 1949, after the deposition of the ratifications of all signatory states.

== Potential military conflict between NATO members ==
Full-scale war between two or more NATO members has never occurred, and is not allowed by Article 1. Should conflict occur, there is not a well-established procedure as to what would happen. One argument is that by Article 8, the two members fall under abeyance of the Treaty; or that due to Article 5, NATO allies would thus enter into war against the aggressor party.

There have been several militarised disputes between NATO allies that have threatened this:

NATO militarised interstate conflicts
Date	Belligerents		Conflict
1958–61, 1972–73, and 1975–76	Belgium; United Kingdom; West Germany	Iceland	Cod Wars
1973–2022	Canada	Denmark	Whisky War
1994–1996	Canada	Spain	Turbot War
Since 1974	Greece	Turkey	Turkish invasion of Cyprus; Cyprus problem
Since 1992	Greece	Turkey	Aegean dispute
2025-2026	United States	Denmark	Greenland crisis

== See also ==
- Warsaw Pact
- Treaty of Brussels
  - Western Union
- 2001 Sino-Russian Treaty of Friendship
- Syrian Civil War
- 2022 NATO virtual summit
- 2022 Madrid summit
