= 2023 U23 World Wrestling Championships – Men's Greco-Roman 82 kg =

Wrestling competitions

Men's Greco-Roman 82 kg at the 2023 U23 World Championships
- Venue: Tirana Olympic Park
- Dates: 27–28 October
- Competitors: 23 from 20 nations

Medalists
gold medal	Aues Gonibov	Authorised Neutral Athletes
silver medal	Alperen Berber	Turkey
bronze medal	Emad Abouelatta	Egypt
bronze medal	Karlo Kodrić	Croatia

The men's Greco-Roman 82 kilograms is a competition featured at the 2023 U23 World Wrestling Championships, and was held in Tirana, Albania on 27 and 28 October 2023.

This Greco-Roman wrestling competition consists of a single-elimination tournament, with a repechage used to determine the winner of two bronze medals. The two finalists face off for gold and silver medals. Each wrestler who loses to one of the two finalists moves into the repechage, culminating in a pair of bronze medal matches featuring the semifinal losers each facing the remaining repechage opponent from their half of the bracket.

== Results ==
Legend

- F — Won by fall

=== Final ===
Final
Alperen Berber (TUR)	0
Aues Gonibov (ANA)	4

=== Top half ===
Round of 32
Karen Khachatryan (ARM)	3
Otto Ketonen (FIN)	2
Emad Abouelatta (EGY)	10
Ilias Pagkalidis (GRE)	0
Kelsi Nelaj (ALB)	3
Tyler Eischens (USA)	4^{F}

Round of 16
Eljan Mammadov (AZE)	0
Alperen Berber (TUR)	5^{F}
Karen Khachatryan (ARM)	3
Ilya Bitseyeu (ANA)	3
Daizo Tanizaki (JPN)	1
Emad Abouelatta (EGY)	5
Tyler Eischens (USA)	10
Branko Kovačević (SRB)	3

Quarterfinals
Alperen Berber (TUR)	7
Karen Khachatryan (ARM)	0
Emad Abouelatta (EGY)	11
Tyler Eischens (USA)	0

Semifinals
Alperen Berber (TUR)	3
Emad Abouelatta (EGY)	1

=== Bottom half ===
Round of 32
Karlo Kodrić (CRO)	11
Rahul Badshra (UWW)	0
Alexander Johansson (SWE)	0
Adam Gardzioła (POL)	9
Péter Dömök (HUN)	2
Ruslan Abdiiev (UKR)	5
Vasile Cojoc (ROU)	3
Semion Brekkeli (MDA)	5

Round of 16
Saba Mamaladze (GEO)	1
Karlo Kodrić (CRO)	7
Adam Gardzioła (POL)	0
Aues Gonibov (ANA)	9
Azimkhon Abdaliyev (KAZ)	0
Ruslan Abdiiev (UKR)	9
Semion Brekkeli (MDA)	3
Daniel Bello (VEN)	6

Quarterfinals
Karlo Kodrić (CRO)	1
Aues Gonibov (ANA)	10
Ruslan Abdiiev (UKR)	9
Daniel Bello (VEN)	0

Semifinals
Aues Gonibov (ANA)	11
Ruslan Abdiiev (UKR)	0

=== Repechage ===
Repechage round 2
Eljan Mammadov (AZE)	3
Karen Khachatryan (ARM)	3
Adam Gardzioła (POL)	3
Karlo Kodrić (CRO)	8

Bronze medals
Karen Khachatryan (ARM)	1
Emad Abouelatta (EGY)	3
Karlo Kodrić (CRO)	3
Ruslan Abdiiev (UKR)	0
