= Left Lane Capital =

American venture capital firm

- Type: Private
- Industry: Venture capital
- Founded: 2019; 7 years ago
- Headquarters: Brooklyn, New York
- Key people: Harley Miller (Founder and Managing Partner); Dan Ahrens (Managing Partner); Vinny Pujji (Managing Partner); Matthew Miller (Managing Partner)
- AUM: US$3.8 billion (as of March 31, 2026)
- Website: www.leftlane.com

Left Lane Capital is a global venture capital firm that invests in internet and technology companies with a consumer orientation. The firm is headquartered in Brooklyn, New York, with an office in London.

== History ==
Left Lane Capital was founded by Harley Miller in 2019. Before founding Left Lane Capital, Miller started his career in 2010 at Insight Partners, where he spent nine years investing in high-growth internet companies. Miller was part of the team that invested in HelloFresh, Udemy, and BlaBlaCar and sat on the board of N26 and Calm. The firm's managing partners are Dan Ahrens, Vinny Pujji, and Matthew Miller; Jason Fiedler, a former managing partner, currently serves as a Venture Advisor.

Left Lane Capital's inaugural fund totaled $630 million. In 2022, the firm announced the closing of its second fund, Left Lane Capital Partners II LP, with a total of $1.4 billion. Left Lane Capital has invested in over 65 companies worldwide. To support these companies, the firm has an in-house platform team named Accelerate that supports its growing portfolio with value-add resources and growth advice.

== Portfolio ==
- GoStudent: An online marketplace for virtual one-to-one tutoring based in Vienna, Austria.
- Jackpocket (acquired by DraftKings): A mobile lottery platform in North America.
- Bilt Rewards: A consumer finance and rewards company for property renters.
- Choco: A company set out to build a more transparent and sustainable food supply chain.
- Masterworks: A platform allowing individuals to buy artworks shares.
- M1 Finance: A company that combines several fintech services into one platform.
- Talkiatry: A virtual mental health service platform.
- Wayflyer: A financing platform for e-commerce merchants.
- Moove: A company focused on providing vehicles and financing solutions to drivers.
- LemFi: A global bank for African immigrants.
- Real American Freestyle: A freestyle wrestling promotion co-founded by Hulk Hogan.
- LOVB: Women's professional indoor volleyball league in the United States.
- Ownwell: Technology company that helps homeowners and real estate investors lower their real estate expenses.
- Holy: German DTC soft drinks startup.
- Prenuvo: Health service that provides full-body MRI (Magnetic Resonance Imaging) scans.
- Blank Street: American coffeehouse chain.

== Recognition ==
Left Lane Capital was recognized as one of the top 25 growth equity firms of 2022 by GrowthCap.

Harley Miller received a placement on Forbes' 30 Under 30 Venture Capital list in 2017. Managing Partners Jason Fiedler and Vinny Pujji appeared on the same list in 2018 and 2022, respectively.
