= 2023 U23 World Wrestling Championships – Men's Greco-Roman 77 kg =

Wrestling competitions

Men's Greco-Roman 77 kg at the 2023 U23 World Championships
- Venue: Tirana Olympic Park
- Dates: 28–29 October
- Competitors: 24 from 21 nations

Medalists
gold medal	Alexandrin Guțu	Moldova
silver medal	Khasay Hasanli	Azerbaijan
bronze medal	Khvicha Ananidze	Georgia
bronze medal	Yryskeldi Maksatbek Uulu	Kyrgyzstan

The men's Greco-Roman 77 kilograms is a competition featured at the 2023 U23 World Wrestling Championships, and was held in Tirana, Albania on 28 and 29 October 2023.

This Greco-Roman wrestling competition consists of a single-elimination tournament, with a repechage used to determine the winner of two bronze medals. The two finalists face off for gold and silver medals. Each wrestler who loses to one of the two finalists moves into the repechage, culminating in a pair of bronze medal matches featuring the semifinal losers each facing the remaining repechage opponent from their half of the bracket.

== Results ==
Legend

- F — Won by fall

=== Final ===
Final
Khasay Hasanli (AZE)	1
Alexandrin Guțu (MDA)	3

=== Top half ===
Round of 32
Dzmitry Navitski (ANA)	5
Ismail Barakhoev (ANA)	8
Khvicha Ananidze (GEO)	7
Payton Jacobson (USA)	5
Hassan Barnawi (KSA)	0
Attila Tösmagi (HUN)	10
Simon Borkenhagen (SWE)	1
Deepak Punia (UWW)	7

Round of 16
Rassul Zhunis (KAZ)	5
Ismail Barakhoev (ANA)	3
Khvicha Ananidze (GEO)	3
Mykyta Politaiev (UKR)	1
Khasay Hasanli (AZE)	9
Attila Tösmagi (HUN)	1
Deepak Punia (UWW)	5
Konrad Kozłowski (POL)	0

Quarterfinals
Rassul Zhunis (KAZ)	3
Khvicha Ananidze (GEO)	4
Khasay Hasanli (AZE)	9^{F}
Deepak Punia (UWW)	2

Semifinals
Khvicha Ananidze (GEO)	0
Khasay Hasanli (AZE)	9

=== Bottom half ===
Round of 32
Aleksa Ilić (SRB)	1
Alexandrin Guțu (MDA)	4
Ibrahim Tabaev (BEL)	16^{F}
Shu Yamada (JPN)	7
Aistis Liaugminas (LTU)	0
Henrik Gevorgyan (ARM)	8
Ömer Can Doğan (TUR)	3
Samuel Bellscheidt (GER)	6

Round of 16
Ardit Ndoj (ALB)	0
Alexandrin Guțu (MDA)	6^{F}
Ibrahim Tabaev (BEL)	9
José Sánchez (PUR)	0
Edvin Kin (EST)	1
Henrik Gevorgyan (ARM)	7
Samuel Bellscheidt (GER)	1
Yryskeldi Maksatbek Uulu (KGZ)	5

Quarterfinals
Alexandrin Guțu (MDA)	5^{F}
Ibrahim Tabaev (BEL)	4
Henrik Gevorgyan (ARM)	1
Yryskeldi Maksatbek Uulu (KGZ)	6

Semifinals
Alexandrin Guțu (MDA)	12
Yryskeldi Maksatbek Uulu (KGZ)	2

=== Repechage ===
Repechage round 1
Aleksa Ilić (SRB)	8
Ardit Ndoj (ALB)	0

Repechage round 2
Attila Tösmagi (HUN)	9
Deepak Punia (UWW)	2
Aleksa Ilić (SRB)	9
Ibrahim Tabaev (BEL)	0

Bronze medals
Attila Tösmagi (HUN)	1
Khvicha Ananidze (GEO)	3
Aleksa Ilić (SRB)	0
Yryskeldi Maksatbek Uulu (KGZ)	8
