= 2023 U23 World Wrestling Championships – Men's Greco-Roman 67 kg =

Wrestling competitions

Men's Greco-Roman 67 kg at the 2023 U23 World Championships
- Venue: Tirana Olympic Park
- Dates: 27–28 October
- Competitors: 22 from 19 nations

Medalists
gold medal	Sultan Assetuly	Kazakhstan
silver medal	Mustafa Safa Yıldırım	Turkey
bronze medal	Haruto Yabe	Japan
bronze medal	Muslim Imadaev	Authorised Neutral Athletes

The men's Greco-Roman 67 kg is a competition featured at the 2023 U23 World Wrestling Championships, and was held in Tirana, Albania on 27 and 28 October 2023.

This freestyle wrestling competition consists of a single-elimination tournament, with a repechage used to determine the winner of two bronze medals. The two finalists face off for gold and silver medals. Each wrestler who loses to one of the two finalists moves into the repechage, culminating in a pair of bronze medal matches featuring the semifinal losers each facing the remaining repechage opponent from their half of the bracket.

== Results ==
Legend

- F — Won by fall

=== Final ===
Final
Mustafa Safa Yıldırım (TUR)	1
Sultan Assetuly (KAZ)	2

=== Top half ===
Round of 32
Ivo Iliev (BUL)	1
Sahak Hovhannisyan (ARM)	1
Umesh (UWW)	1
Mustafa Safa Yıldırım (TUR)	9
Aleksander Mielewczyk (POL)	2
Adomas Grigaliūnas (LTU)	4

Round of 16
Ermek Kanybek Uulu (KGZ)	3
Haruto Yabe (JPN)	5
Ivo Iliev (BUL)	1
Gagik Snjoyan (FRA)	5
Robert Perez (USA)	0
Mustafa Safa Yıldırım (TUR)	2
Adomas Grigaliūnas (LTU)	0
Artur Jeremejev (EST)	5

Quarterfinals
Haruto Yabe (JPN)	4
Gagik Snjoyan (FRA)	4
Mustafa Safa Yıldırım (TUR)	5
Artur Jeremejev (EST)	1

Semifinals
Haruto Yabe (JPN)	3
Mustafa Safa Yıldırım (TUR)	3

=== Bottom half ===
Round of 32
Alexandr Gurali (MDA)	1
Hasan Mammadli (AZE)	5
Illia Valeuski (ANA)	9
Ahmed Barahmah (KSA)	0
Oleg Khalilov (UKR)	1
Sultan Assetuly (KAZ)	1

Round of 16
Ardit Zeneli (ALB)	0
Hasan Mammadli (AZE)	9
Illia Valeuski (ANA)	0
Moustafa Alameldin (EGY)	7
Steve Momilia (ITA)	0
Sultan Assetuly (KAZ)	9
Diego Chkhikvadze (GEO)	2
Muslim Imadaev (ANA)	11

Quarterfinals
Hasan Mammadli (AZE)	3
Moustafa Alameldin (EGY)	1
Sultan Assetuly (KAZ)	1
Muslim Imadaev (ANA)	1

Semifinals
Hasan Mammadli (AZE)	0
Sultan Assetuly (KAZ)	11

=== Repechage ===
Repechage round 1
Umesh (UWW)	1
Robert Perez (USA)	3
Oleg Khalilov (UKR)	11
Steve Momilia (ITA)	0

Repechage round 2
Robert Perez (USA)	2
Artur Jeremejev (EST)	3
Oleg Khalilov (UKR)	0
Muslim Imadaev (ANA)	9

Bronze medals
Artur Jeremejev (EST)	0
Haruto Yabe (JPN)	8
Muslim Imadaev (ANA)	12
Hasan Mammadli (AZE)	10
