= 2023 U23 World Wrestling Championships – Men's freestyle 74 kg =

Wrestling competitions

Men's freestyle 74 kg at the 2023 U23 World Championships
- Venue: Tirana Olympic Park
- Dates: 23–24 October
- Competitors: 24 from 21 nations

Medalists
gold medal	Keegan O'Toole	United States
silver medal	Imam Ganishov	Authorised Neutral Athletes
bronze medal	Hikaru Takata	Japan
bronze medal	Naveen Malik

The men's freestyle 74 kg is a competition featured at the 2023 U23 World Wrestling Championships, and was held in Tirana, Albania on 23 and 24 October 2023.

This freestyle wrestling competition consists of a single-elimination tournament, with a repechage used to determine the winner of two bronze medals. The two finalists face off for gold and silver medals. Each wrestler who loses to one of the two finalists moves into the repechage, culminating in a pair of bronze medal matches featuring the semifinal losers each facing the remaining repechage opponent from their half of the bracket.

== Results ==
Legend

- F — Won by fall

=== Final ===
Final
Keegan O'Toole (USA)	6
Imam Ganishov (ANA)	1

=== Top half ===
Round of 32
Nasser Sayed (EGY)	0
Hayk Papikyan (ARM)	9
Giorgi Gogritchiani (GEO)	2
Metehan Yaprak (TUR)	6
Yerbarys Satybaldy (KAZ)	1
Hikaru Takata (JPN)	5
Keegan O'Toole (USA)	10
Vadym Kurylenko (UKR)	0

Round of 16
Sonny Santiago (PUR)	3
Hayk Papikyan (ARM)	1
Metehan Yaprak (TUR)	7
Christos Christoforidis (GRE)	1
Nikolay Dimitrov (BUL)	0
Hikaru Takata (JPN)	2
Keegan O'Toole (USA)	12
Krisztian Biro (ROU)	2

Quarterfinals
Sonny Santiago (PUR)	3
Metehan Yaprak (TUR)	1
Hikaru Takata (JPN)	1
Keegan O'Toole (USA)	10

Semifinals
Sonny Santiago (PUR)	0
Keegan O'Toole (USA)	8^{F}

=== Bottom half ===
Round of 32
Imam Ganishov (ANA)	8
Vasile Diacon (MDA)	0
Muhammad Abdurachmanov (BEL)	5
Patrik Leder (CAN)	3
Mohamed Ali Zorgui (TUN)	6
Diego Sandoval (MEX)	8
Naveen Malik (UWW)	5
Nikita Dmitrijevs Mayeuski (ANA)	0

Round of 16
Stas David Wolf (GER)	3
Imam Ganishov (ANA)	13
Muhammad Abdurachmanov (BEL)	4
Harry Duno (VEN)	2
Szymon Wojtkowski (POL)	8
Diego Sandoval (MEX)	2
Naveen Malik (UWW)	5
Dzhabrail Gadzhiev (AZE)	3

Quarterfinals
Imam Ganishov (ANA)	10
Muhammad Abdurachmanov (BEL)	0
Szymon Wojtkowski (POL)	2
Naveen Malik (UWW)	9^{F}

Semifinals
Imam Ganishov (ANA)	10
Naveen Malik (UWW)	0

=== Repechage ===
Repechage round 1
Vadym Kurylenko (UKR)	7
Krisztian Biro (ROU)	4
Vasile Diacon (MDA)	5
Stas David Wolf (GER)	2

Repechage round 2
Vadym Kurylenko (UKR)	4
Hikaru Takata (JPN)	15
Vasile Diacon (MDA)	10
Muhammad Abdurachmanov (BEL)	0

Bronze medals
Hikaru Takata (JPN)	11
Sonny Santiago (PUR)	0
Vasile Diacon (MDA)	7
Naveen Malik (UWW)	7
