= Jackpocket =

Tech company and app

Jackpocket Inc.
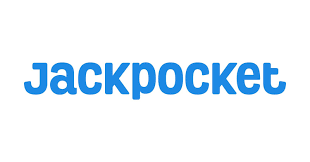
- Company type: Subsidiary
- Industry: Lottery
- Founded: 2013; 13 years ago
- Founder: Peter Sullivan
- Headquarters: New York City
- Owner: DraftKings; (2024–present)
- Number of employees: 200+ (2022)
- Website: www.jackpocket.com

Jackpocket, Inc. is an American technology company headquartered in New York City which is a subsidiary of DraftKings. It produces an app for ordering lottery tickets in seventeen U.S. states, along with Washington, D.C. and Puerto Rico.

== History ==
Jackpocket (a portmanteau of 'jackpot' and 'pocket') was founded in 2013 by Peter Sullivan to create an app for ordering lottery tickets.

The company operates as a lottery courier service; users can order lottery tickets through the Jackpocket app, but the tickets are purchased by the company on the user's behalf; it earns its revenue from service fees when a user funds their account. Over 2024, fees rose from 10% of funded amount to 14%.

The physical tickets are scanned and accessible digitally via the app, and winnings under $600 are automatically redeemed into the user's account. It is the first registered lottery courier service in New York and New Jersey, the two U.S. states which have passed regulations for the operation of digital lottery courier services.

In October 2021, a New Jersey Lottery player won a $9.4 million jackpot on a Pick-6 ticket ordered via the Jackpocket app.

In November 2021, the company raised a $120 million Series D round led by venture capital firm Left Lane Capital which included participation from Mark Cuban. Up to that point Jackpocket had raised $200 million and was valued at $620 million.

In 2022, Jackpocket received a casino license in New Jersey through a deal with Caesars Interactive Entertainment and will be launching iGaming products by 2023. In December 2022, Jackpocket signed a sponsorship deal with the Dallas Stars of the National Hockey League.

On February 15, 2024, the company announced its sale to DraftKings for $750 million, a deal completed on May 23.
