= David Sahadi =

American multimedia producer (born 1961)

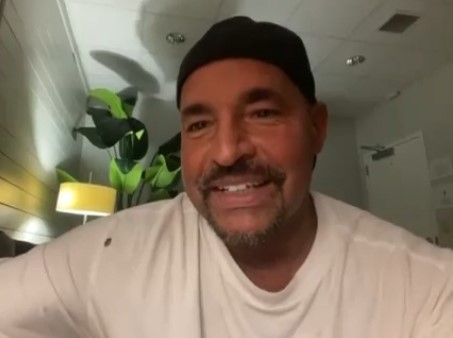
- Sahadi in 2022
- Born: October 24, 1961 (age 64); New York City, U.S.
- Education: Manhattanville University; B.S. mathematics
- Occupation: multimedia producer
- Years active: 1982–present
- Employer(s): NBC Sports (1982–1992); WWE (1992–2003); TNA (2004–2017; 2019-2024); MLW (2019; 2024-2025); RAF (2025-present)

David Sahadi (born October 24, 1961, in Brooklyn, New York) is an American multimedia producer, who currently works for Real American Freestyle.

He previously worked for NBC Sports, WWE, Total Nonstop Action Wrestling, and Major League Wrestling.

== Biography ==
=== NBC Sports (1982–1992) ===
Sahadi attended Manhattanville University and earned a bachelor's degree in mathematics, but had grown disenchanted with mathematics by the time he graduated. He spent the summer following his graduation painting houses before his father obtained him a Sunday job working for NBC Sports as a "logger", a job which required him to watch football games broadcast on NBC and take a detailed record of the events of the game in order to help with the production of highlight reels.

After the football season ended, Sahadi began working in the sports promotions department as a production assistant. Two years later, he was made Highlight Supervisor, producing packages which would be sent to Bob Costas, who would add a voiceover. Sahadi was eventually promoted to the position of Manager of On-Air Promotions for NBC Sports, and produced advertising campaigns for the NFL, NBA and the 1992 Summer Olympics. It was then that Sahadi began to come into conflict with his employees, as, while he wanted to create fast-paced video packages, NBC favored a more sedate editing style. When he was approached by the World Wrestling Federation (a national professional wrestling promotion) before the 1992 Olympics, Sahadi accepted their job offer.

=== World Wrestling Federation / Entertainment (1992–2003) ===
Sahadi began working for the WWF on October 19, 1992, and was appointed Creative Director of On-air Promotions. In 1995, he headed the production of an opening video for Raw, the flagship television program of the WWF. The ambitious video featured a band playing atop Titan Towers, the corporate headquarters of the WWF, and a helicopter circling the roof. Sahadi would go on to head a team of seven technicians who produced video packages and vignettes designed to promote and advertise wrestlers, television programs, pay-per-views and merchandise.

Prior to WrestleMania XIV on March 29, 1998, Sahadi produced a video featuring Pat Patterson, Gorilla Monsoon, Ernie Ladd, Killer Kowalski and Sahadi's close friend "Classy" Freddie Blassie which reduced WWF owner Vince McMahon to tears. At the 2001 Promax & BDA award ceremony in Miami Beach, Florida, Sahadi, along with two members of his team, Kevin Sullivan and Barry Bross, received seven awards for promotional material.

Throughout 2002 and 2003, Sahadi began to grow unhappy which hindered his creative ability with the WWF (now renamed World Wrestling Entertainment, or WWE) product. He objected to the controversial and almost universally unpopular "Katie Vick" storyline (which culminated in a vignette in which Triple H, dressed as Kane, simulated necrophilia with a mannequin), but was informed that any dissenters would be released from the company. In addition to his creative objections, Sahadi became disillusioned with his executive position and high salary, claiming that "I had reached a point in my life where this illusory world had lost all its appeal. I wanted something deeper, more profound in life." In June 2003 Sahadi decided to leave WWE, and negotiated a release with his superior, the WWE Executive Vice President of Television Production, Kevin Dunn. He left WWE one month later.

=== Total Nonstop Action Wrestling / Impact Wrestling / Global Force Wrestling (2004–2017) ===
Sahadi sold his house, he then proceeded to spend a year hiking through several American national parks before settling in the mountains of North Carolina, where he wrote a novel, Last Call of the Gods. In the summer of 2004, CDHM, an advertising agency based in Connecticut, asked Sahadi to arrange a meeting with Jeff Jarrett, the vice president of TNA Entertainment, LLC, the parent company of Total Nonstop Action Wrestling, the second biggest professional wrestling promotion in the United States. In the course of setting up the meeting, Sahadi befriended Jarrett, and eventually agreed to join TNA as a producer for three months, starting in August 2004.

After joining TNA, Sahadi quickly made his presence felt, with a near unanimous consensus that the production values of TNA rose sharply after he joined the promotion. His first major piece of work was the production of the introductory video to Victory Road, the first monthly pay-per-view held by TNA, which was broadcast on November 7, 2004. After the three months had expired, Sahadi decided to remain with TNA.

In November 2004, Sahadi discovered that WWE was filming an advertisement for the 2005 Royal Rumble in the Orlando, Florida-based Universal Studios, not far from SoundStage 21, where TNA recorded pay-per-views and episodes of TNA Impact!. TNA decided to send wrestlers Abyss, Traci, Shane Douglas and the 3Live Kru, along with backstage personnel Jeremy Borash, Bill Banks, and Tim Welch, to welcome the WWE employees, bringing them milk, cookies and balloons. The TNA employees confronted their WWE contemporaries outside of the studio in which the commercial was being filmed and handed out their balloons. 3Live Kru member B.G. James commented on the opulence of the WWE buffet, asking if he could have some mahi-mahi, and then asked to speak with Vince McMahon as "I made him a bunch of money back in the day" (as one-half of the New Age Outlaws and a member of D-Generation X, James was partly responsible for large merchandise sales throughout 1998 and 1999), while fellow 3Live Kru member Konnan commented that McMahon "...is a stand up guy, but sometimes he has to sit down to aim".

Following the event, WWE filed a complaint with Universal Studios and ordered TNA to hand over the footage or face a lawsuit, while several WWE employees contacted and harassed Sahadi, with some threatening physical violence. Possibly as a form of retaliation against Sahadi, Sahadi's father, Lou Sahadi, a long term WWE employee working in the public relations department (and the proposed ghostwriter for Mick Foley's autobiography, Have a Nice Day: A Tale of Blood and Sweatsocks) was fired. In addition, Kevin Dunn allegedly threatened to fire any WWE employee who contacted Sahadi. TNA aired the footage at their December 2004 pay-per-view, Turning Point, albeit with the faces of all WWE employees and all instances of the WWE logo blurred.

In May 2005 Sahadi began writing a column for TNA called "The Spirit of Wrestling". The May 24, 2007, column was written in honor of Jeff Jarrett's wife Jill, who died the day prior. Sahadi left Impact Wrestling on December 12, 2017.

=== Major League Wrestling (2019) ===
In early April 2019, Sahadi signed to Major League Wrestling in a backstage role.

=== Return to Impact Wrestling / TNA (2019–2024) ===
In November 2019, Sahadi announced he would be returning to Impact Wrestling as producer on full time. Along with much of the Impact Wrestling production team, Sahadi produced the PPV Ric Flair's Last Match on July 31, 2022. He was released in May 2024.

=== Return to MLW (2024–2025) ===
In June 2024, Sahadi returned to MLW as Executive Producer.

=== Real American Freestyle (2025–present) ===
Sahadi was hired as producer for Real American Freestyle in July 2025.
