= Talkiatry =

Psychiatric telehealth service

Talkiatry Holdings
- Type: Private
- Industry: Telehealth
- Founded: 2019; 7 years ago in New York, U.S.
- Founders: Robert Krayn; Dr. Georgia Gaveras
- Headquarters: New York, New York, U.S.
- Area served: United States (45 states, excl. Alaska, Delaware, Hawaii, North Dakota, and Wyoming)
- Key people: Robert Krayn (CEO); Dr. Georgia Gaveras (CMO)
- Website: talkiatry.com

Talkiatry is a telehealth-based psychiatry company that provides virtual mental health services for conditions such as anxiety, depression, and post-traumatic stress disorder.

== History ==
Talkiatry was co-founded in 2019 by Robert Krayn and Dr. Georgia Gaveras. Talkiatry launched in 2020 and was originally going to offer both in-office and virtual appointments, with its first appointment scheduled for April 2020 in its New York office, but lockdown orders stemming from the COVID-19 pandemic resulted in a shift to a fully virtual practice. The company ultimately grew as a result of many in-office appointments having been cancelled due to the pandemic.

In 2021, Talkiatry opened a physical office space in the Hudson Square neighborhood of Manhattan.

In 2022, Talkiatry received $37 million in Series A funding. The funding process began in 2021, when the company initially received $20 million in funding, earning an additional $17 million from Left Lane Capital in the following year.

In June 2024, Talkiatry received a $130 million equity and debt investment from Andreessen Horowitz. As of that date, the company had raised $245 million in total funding.

In February 2026, Talkiatry raised $210 million in Series D equity and debt financing led by Perceptive Advisors, with participation from Sofina, Andreessen Horowitz, Blisce and Left Lane Capital, and debt financing from Banc of California. The round brought the company’s total funding to more than $400 million.

=== Litigation ===
In October 2025, a class action lawsuit was advanced against Talkiatry, alleging that the company shared the health information of patients with Meta Platforms without consent. In January 2026, a federal court rejected Talkiatry's request to dismiss the class action.

=== Studies ===
In December 2023, a study was published in the Journal of Medical Internet Research examining outcomes for 1,826 Talkiatry patients. Following an average of five visits over fifteen weeks, 67% no longer met criteria for clinically significant anxiety, and 62% no longer met criteria for clinically significant depression. Overall, symptom remission was achieved by 26% of patients with anxiety and 29% of those with depression.

In 2025, a study of 796 adult telepsychiatry patients found that patients were more likely to discontinue care early when they reported a weaker relationship with their psychiatrist or had higher first-visit costs.

== Operations ==
Talkiatry provides psychiatry services for adults as well as for children and adolescents. Its adult psychiatry program has served as a basis for the expansion of its child and adolescent programs into additional markets.

In July 2023, the company began offering continuing education credits to its practitioners, following approval by the Accreditation Council for Continuing Medical Education.

As of February 2026, Talkiatry employed more than 800 licensed psychiatrists and 300 therapists. The company participates as an in-network provider with approximately 60 health insurance plans, including Aetna, Blue Cross Blue Shield, UnitedHealthcare, Cigna, and Humana.

=== Partnerships ===
In August 2023, Talkiatry partnered with NOCD, a virtual practice focusing on treating obsessive-compulsive disorder, becoming referral partners for specialized treatments. Later that year, the company would partner with Charlie Health to coordinate care for patients ages 11 to 33, allowing referrals between the two companies, depending on differing levels of severity of outpatient mental health treatment.

In September 2024, Talkiatry partnered with BetterHelp, becoming a telepsychiatry provider for BetterHelp's employer clients through BetterHelp Business.

In October 2024, Talkiatry partnered with Biogen to expand postpartum depression care services.

In April 2026, Talkiatry partnered with the American Medical Group Association (AMGA), allowing AMGA's member organizations to access Talkiatry's services.
