= 2024 European Wrestling Championships – Men's freestyle 74 kg =

Wrestling competition

Men's freestyle 74 kg at the 2024 European Wrestling Championships
- Venue: Polyvalent Hall
- Location: Bucharest, Romania
- Dates: 17-18 February
- Competitors: 22

Medalists
gold medal	Tajmuraz Salkazanov	Slovakia
silver medal	Soner Demirtaş	Turkey
bronze medal	Turan Bayramov	Azerbaijan
bronze medal	Imam Ganishov	Individual Neutral Athletes

The men's freestyle 74 kg is a competition featured at the 2024 European Wrestling Championships, and was held in Bucharest, Romania on February 17 and 18.

== Results ==
Legend

- F — Won by fall

=== Final ===
Final
Tajmuraz Salkazanov (SVK)	5
Soner Demirtaş (TUR)	0

=== Top half ===
Round of 32
Vasile Diacon (MDA)	9
Raul Caso (ITA)	0
Vadym Kurylenko (UKR)	0
Mohammad Mottaghinia (ESP)	7
Hayk Papikyan (ARM)	3
Patryk Ołenczyn (POL)	3

Round of 16
Turan Bayramov (AZE)	11
Zelimkhan Khadjiev (FRA)	1
Vasile Diacon (MDA)	WO
~~Chermen Valiev (ALB)~~
Rasul Shapiev (MKD)	2
Mohammad Mottaghinia (ESP)	12
Hayk Papikyan (ARM)	1
Tajmuraz Salkazanov (SVK)	2

Quarterfinals
Turan Bayramov (AZE)	4
Vasile Diacon (MDA)	2
Mohammad Mottaghinia (ESP)	1
Tajmuraz Salkazanov (SVK)	4

Semifinals
Turan Bayramov (AZE)	1
Tajmuraz Salkazanov (SVK)	7

=== Bottom half ===
Round of 32
Imam Ganishov (AIN)	12
Malik Amine (SMR)	0
Nikita Dmitrijevs Mayeuski (AIN)	3
Stas David Wolf (GER)	5
Ibragim Veliev (BEL)	7
Ivan Stoyanov (BUL)	1

Round of 16
Soner Demirtaş (TUR)	3
Imam Ganishov (AIN)	2
Stas David Wolf (GER)	4
Giorgi Gogritchiani (GEO)	8
Krisztian Biro (ROU)	11
Ibragim Veliev (BEL)	0
Mitch Finesilver (ISR)	2
Murad Kuramagomedov (HUN)	3

Quarterfinals
Soner Demirtaş (TUR)	13
Giorgi Gogritchiani (GEO)	2
Krisztian Biro (ROU)	4
Murad Kuramagomedov (HUN)	7

Semifinals
Soner Demirtaş (TUR)	3
Murad Kuramagomedov (HUN)	0

=== Repechage ===
Repechage round 2
Hayk Papikyan (ARM)	0
Mohammad Mottaghinia (ESP)	10
Imam Ganishov (AIN)	10
Giorgi Gogritchiani (GEO)	1

Bronze medal match
Mohammad Mottaghinia (ESP)	0
Turan Bayramov (AZE)	4
Imam Ganishov (AIN)	4
Murad Kuramagomedov (HUN)	1

== Final standing ==
Rank	Athlete
1st place, gold medalist(s)	Tajmuraz Salkazanov (SVK)
2nd place, silver medalist(s)	Soner Demirtaş (TUR)
3rd place, bronze medalist(s)	Turan Bayramov (AZE)
3rd place, bronze medalist(s)	Imam Ganishov (AIN)
5	Mohammad Mottaghinia (ESP)
5	Murad Kuramagomedov (HUN)
7	Vasile Diacon (MDA)
8	Krisztian Biro (ROU)
9	Giorgi Gogritchiani (GEO)
10	Stas David Wolf (GER)
11	Hayk Papikyan (ARM)
12	Ibragim Veliev (BEL)
13	Patryk Ołenczyn (POL)
14	Nikita Dmitrijevs Mayeuski (AIN)
15	Mitch Finesilver (ISR)
16	Rasul Shapiev (MKD)
17	Ivan Stoyanov (BUL)
18	Zelimkhan Khadjiev (FRA)
19	Vadym Kurylenko (UKR)
20	Raul Caso (ITA)
21	Malik Amine (SMR)
—	Chermen Valiev (ALB)
