= RAF 11 =

2026 wrestling event

RAF 11: Tsarukyan vs. Covington
- The poster for RAF 11: Tsarukyan vs. Covington
- Promotion: Real American Freestyle
- Date: July 18, 2026
- Venue: UW–Milwaukee Panther Arena
- City: Milwaukee, Wisconsin
- Attendance: 7,000+

Event chronology
RAF Georgia: Dvalishvili vs. Cejudo	RAF 11: Tsarukyan vs. Covington	RAF 12: Dvalishvili vs. Cejudo 2

RAF 11: Tsarukyan vs. Covington was a freestyle wrestling event produced by the Real American Freestyle (RAF) promotion that took place on July 18, 2026, at the UW–Milwaukee Panther Arena in Milwaukee, Wisconsin.

== Background ==
The event featured the introduction of the promotion's new RAF Cruiserweight Crossover Championship, a symbolic special attraction title created for athletes crossing over from other sports to compete on the RAF mats. The inaugural bout saw former interim UFC Welterweight Champion Colby Covington face undefeated contender Arman Tsarukyan.

Former Bellator Welterweight Champion and former ONE Welterweight Champion Ben Askren, a two-time NCAA Division I national champion who nearly died from pneumonia in 2025, faced former UFC Welterweight Champion Belal Muhammad in the co-main event.

An RAF Women's Strawweight Champion bout between Lucía Yépez and Felicity Taylor took place at the event. On June 23, for undisclosed reasons, inaugural champion, 2024 Summer Olympics gold medalist and seven-time Pan American Wrestling Championships gold medalist Sarah Hildebrandt was stripped off her title and Yépez was promoted to undisputed champion.

RAF Bantamweight Champion Austin DeSanto was scheduled defend his title against Ben Davino. However, for undisclosed reasons, DeSanto withdrew from the match and was replaced by Arsen Harutyunyan.

== Results ==
Main card
Weight class				Method	Round	Time	Notes
Cruiserweight	(United States) Colby Covington	def.	(Armenia) Arman Tsarukyan	Decision (5–3)	3	2:00	(Note: For the inaugural RAF Crossover Cruiserweight Championship.)
Cruiserweight	(Palestine) Belal Muhammad	def.	(United States) Ben Askren	Decision (6–3)	3	2:00
Catchweight (159 lb)	(United States) Frankie Edgar	def.	(United States) Clay Guida	Decision (9–1)	3	2:00
Middleweight	(United States) Keegan O'Toole	def.	(Jamaica) Christopher Minto	Decision (14–9)	3	2:00
Women's Cruiserweight	(United States) Adeline Gray	def.	(United States) Skylar Grote	Decision (5–2)	3	2:00
Bantamweight	(Armenia) Arsen Harutyunyan	def.	(United States) Ben Davino	Decision (6–5)	3	2:00
Light Heavyweight	(United States) Trent Hidlay	def.	(Azerbaijan) Magomedkhan Magomedov	Technical fall (10–0)	3	0:12
Cruiserweight	(Bulgaria) Magomed Ramazanov	def.	(United States) Aeoden Sinclair	Decision (5–3)	3	2:00
Light Heavyweight	(United States) Zac Braunagel	def.	(United States) Pat Downey	Technical fall (12–2)	2	1:15
Heavyweight	(United States) Anthony Cassioppi	def.	(Egypt) Mostafa Elders	Decision (6–2)	3	2:00
Welterweight	(United States) Michael Caliendo	def.	(Uzbekistan) Mirzo Khayitov	Decision (9–2)	3	2:00
Women's Strawweight	(Ecuador) Lucía Yépez (c)	def.	(United States) Felicity Taylor	Technical fall (10–0)	2	1:10	(Note: For the RAF Women's Strawweight Championship.)

== Bonus awards ==
The following athletes received bonuses.

- Match of the Night: Colby Covington vs. Arman Tsarukyan and Belal Muhammad vs. Ben Askren
- Performance of the Night: Trent Hidlay

== See also ==
- List of RAF events
