= Real American Freestyle =

American freestyle wrestling promotion

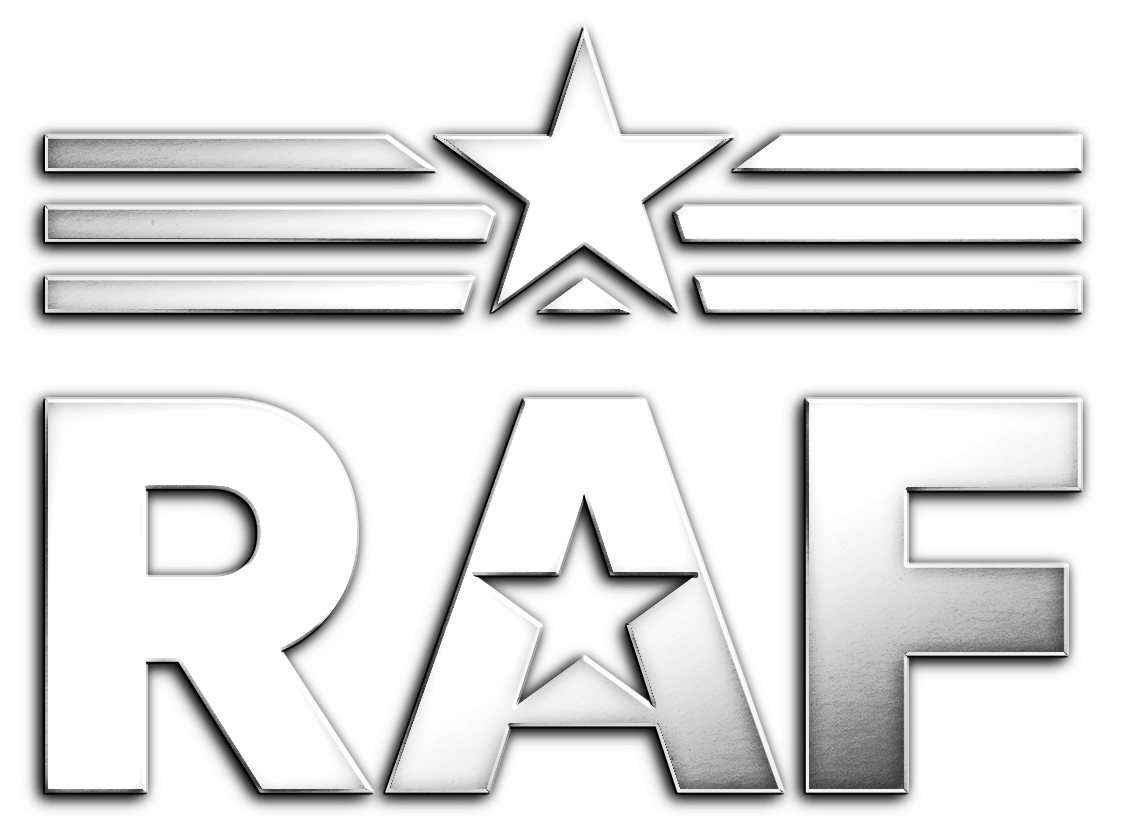
- Type: Private
- Industry: Freestyle wrestling; Streaming media
- Founded: April 30, 2025; 18 months ago
- Founders: Chad Bronstein; Izzy Martinez; Hulk Hogan; Eric Bischoff
- Headquarters: Tampa, Florida, United States
- Key people: Chad Bronstein (CEO); Izzy Martinez (COO); Eric Bischoff (CMO)
- Parent: Real American Wrestling, Inc.
- Website: realamericanfreestyle.com

Real American Freestyle (RAF) is an American freestyle wrestling promotion owned by Real American Wrestling, Inc. and headquartered in Tampa, Florida. It was founded in 2025 by Chad Bronstein, Izzy Martinez, Eric Bischoff and Hulk Hogan.

Competitors include current and former high school wrestlers, collegiate wrestlers, Olympic wrestlers, and mixed martial artists. The promotion provides an opportunity for wrestlers to compete and profit from the sport, as amateur wrestling historically does not permit compensation. A partnership with USA Wrestling allows current NCAA wrestlers to compete and receive compensation through NIL sponsorships.

Fox Nation is the official broadcast home of the promotion's flagship events, international events, RAF Next Gen youth events, and the reality series RAF Undiscovered.

RAF Clubs are a chain of wrestling academies owned and operated by the promotion.

== History ==
=== 2024: Planning and development ===
Terri Francis was general counsel for Anheuser-Busch InBev, where she also served as their vice president of investment and innovation until 2022. Chad Bronstein was president of Carma HoldCo until 2023, where he helped the company partner with Hulk Hogan to launch his Immortal by Hulk Hogan line of cannabis products.

Bronstein and Francis partnered with Hogan to launch Real American Beer (RAB) on June 13, 2024, a light beer manufactured by City Brewing Company that carried Hogan's likeness. The beer's name was a nod to "Real American", Hogan's longtime WWE theme song. WWE is a minority owner of Real American Beer.

Bronstein's son attended a Chicago wrestling camp in 2024 that was led by renowned coach Izzy Martinez. Bronstein and Hogan were impressed by Martinez, and they began to develop plans with him for a new sport wrestling venture.

=== 2025: Promotion's launch ===
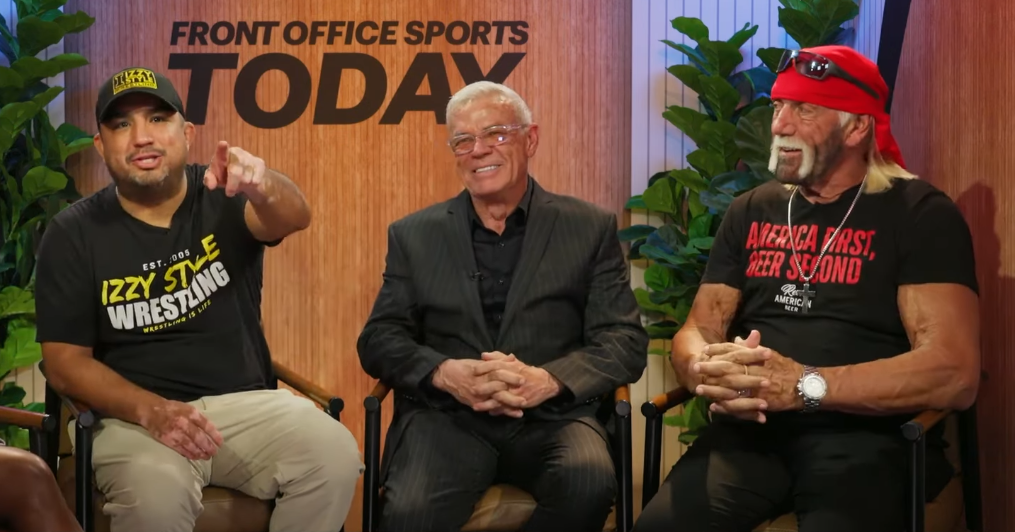
RAF COO Izzy Martinez (left), CMO Eric Bischoff, and co-founder Hulk Hogan during their May 2025 press tour

Hulk Hogan and Eric Bischoff announced the formation of Real American Freestyle (RAF) on April 30, 2025. The freestyle wrestling promotion is backed financially by Left Lane Capital and the venture capital fund Cassius, with $3.5 million raised at launch. Chad Bronstein is chief executive officer, Bischoff is chief media officer, and Izzy Martinez is chief operating officer.

Hogan and Bischoff said their goal with the promotion was to elevate and develop top-level competitive wrestlers into stars. They planned on doing that by emphasizing the backstories of each athlete like The Voice does for its singers. David Sahadi was hired as the promotion's multimedia producer to accomplish this, having previously worked with Bischoff.

MOGL founder Brandon Wimbush was hired as the promotion's chief of staff, wrestler Lance Palmer was hired as the head of talent development, and MatScouts founder Willie Saylor was hired as the vice president of talent development on May 30, 2025.

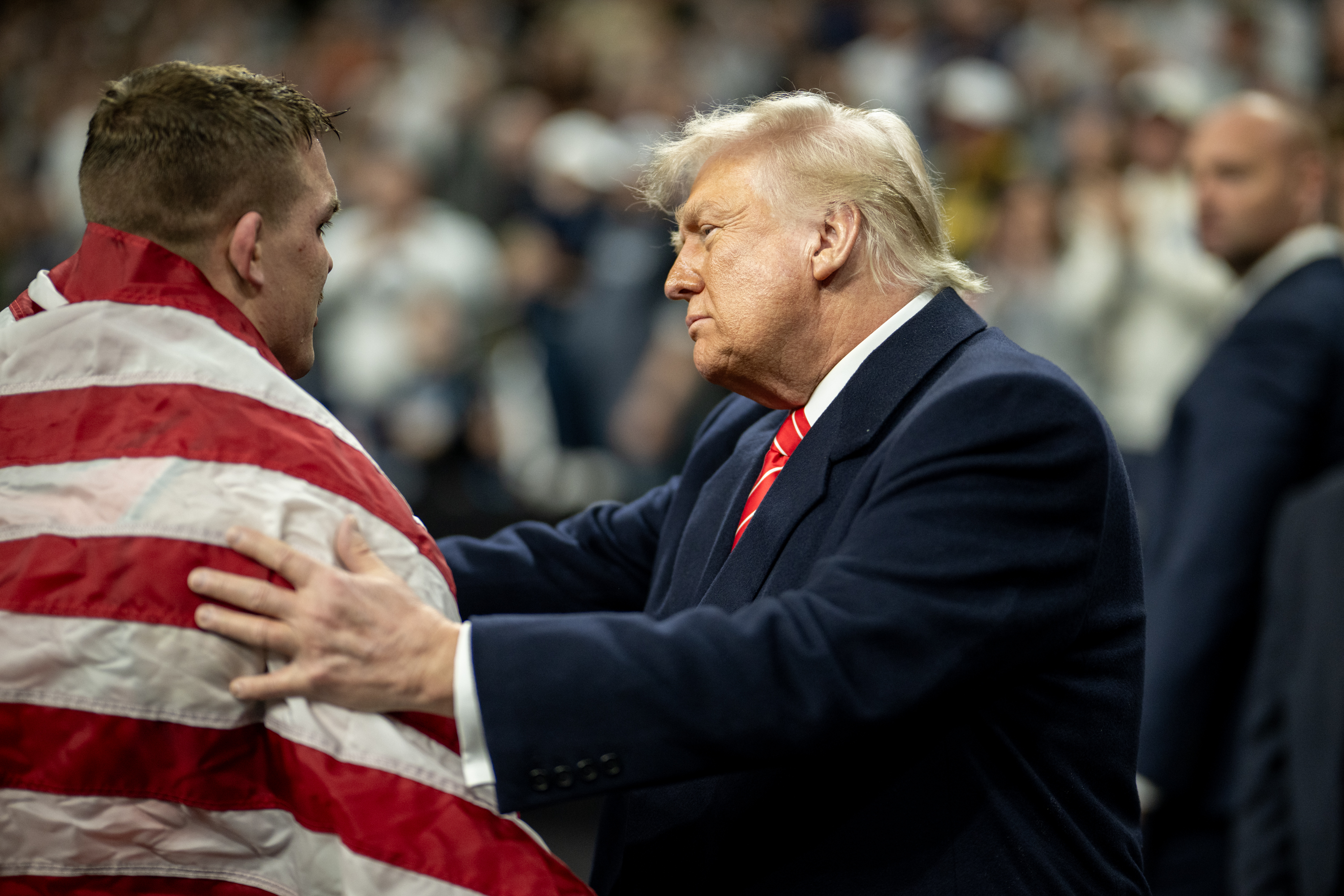
RAF signee Wyatt Hendrickson (left) being congratulated by American president Donald Trump for his victory at the 2025 NCAA Division I Men's Wrestling Championships

Wyatt Hendrickson was signed to the promotion's roster on June 4, 2025. Hulk Hogan cited mainstream coverage of Hendrickson's upset of Olympic gold medalist Gable Steveson in the 2025 NCAA Division I Men's Wrestling Championships as a testament to the sport's popularity. Steveson has a clothing line with Takedown Sportswear, the official manufacturer of RAF apparel.

RAF 01 was held in co-founder Chad Bronstein's hometown of Cleveland, Ohio on August 30, 2025. It featured a video tribute to co-founder Hulk Hogan, who had died the month prior, that was produced by WWE. Wyatt Hendrickson won his main event match against Mostafa Elders to become the inaugural RAF Heavyweight Champion.

RAF launched their first line of trading cards in October 2025.

A multi-year partnership with ALT Sports Data was announced on November 4, 2025 that allows betting on RAF matches through major sportsbooks.

=== 2026: International signings and expansion ===
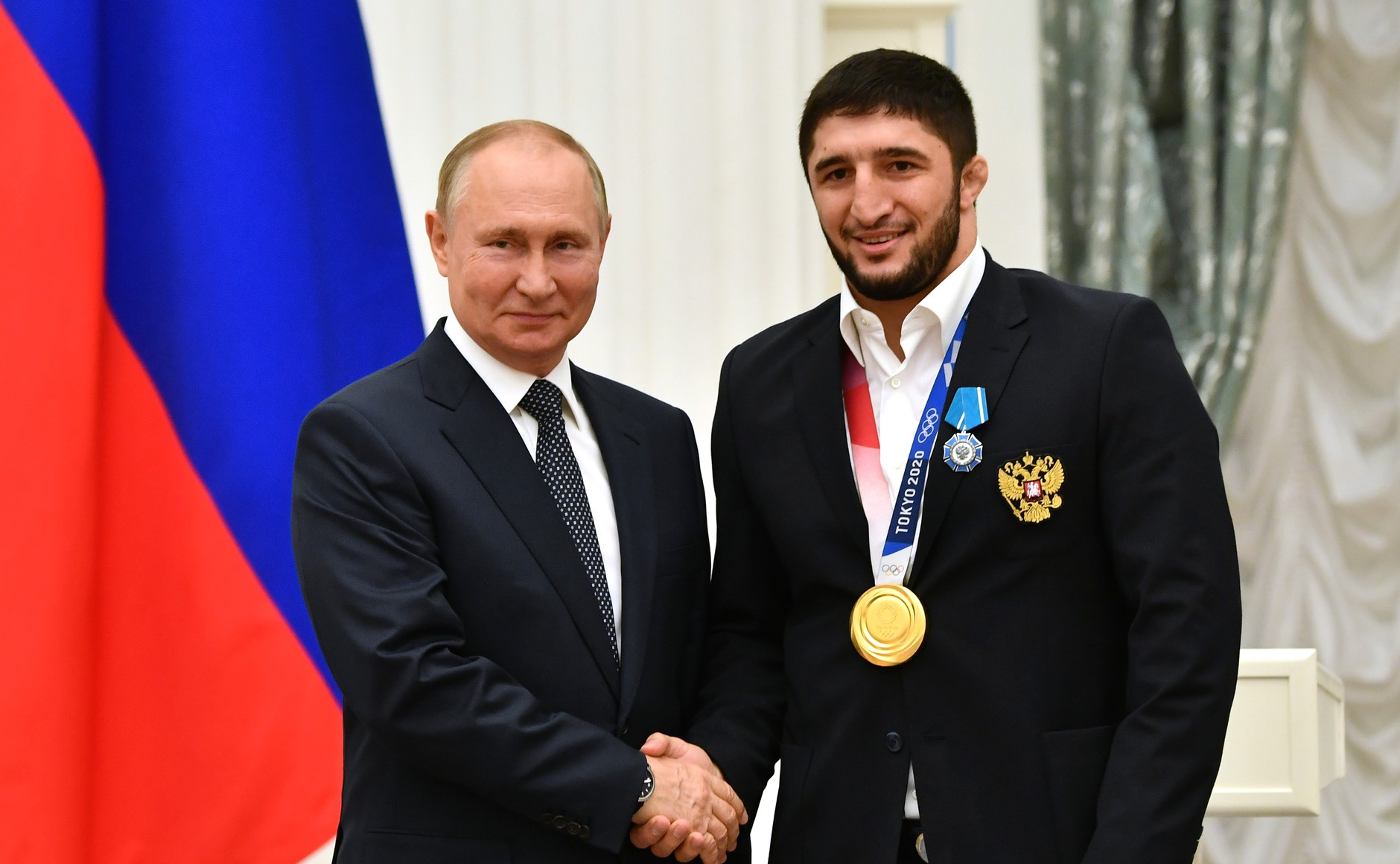
RAF signee Abdulrashid Sadulaev (right) being congratulated by Russian president Vladimir Putin for his victory at the 2020 Summer Olympics

Two-time Olympic gold medalist Abdulrashid Sadulaev signed an exclusive contract with RAF on January 15, 2026. Sadulaev will receive a reported salary of $100,000 per match, with additional payments of $100,000 for each bout he wins.

RAF: Wrestling’s Greatest Takedowns aired January 29, 2026 on Fox Nation. The special was hosted by Colby Covington, and featured highlights from the promotion’s initial flagship events.

A post-match brawl between Arman Tsarukyan and Georgio Poullas at RAF 06 on February 28, 2026 led the promotion to book an immediate rematch between the two as the main event of RAF 07. Poullas reportedly received the highest salary ever afforded for a single competitive wrestling bout.

Gable Steveson signed a multi-match contract with RAF on March 25, 2026.

RAF Next Gen launched on May 7, 2026, a USA Wrestling tournament series that will allow youth wrestlers to compete and earn RAF championships.

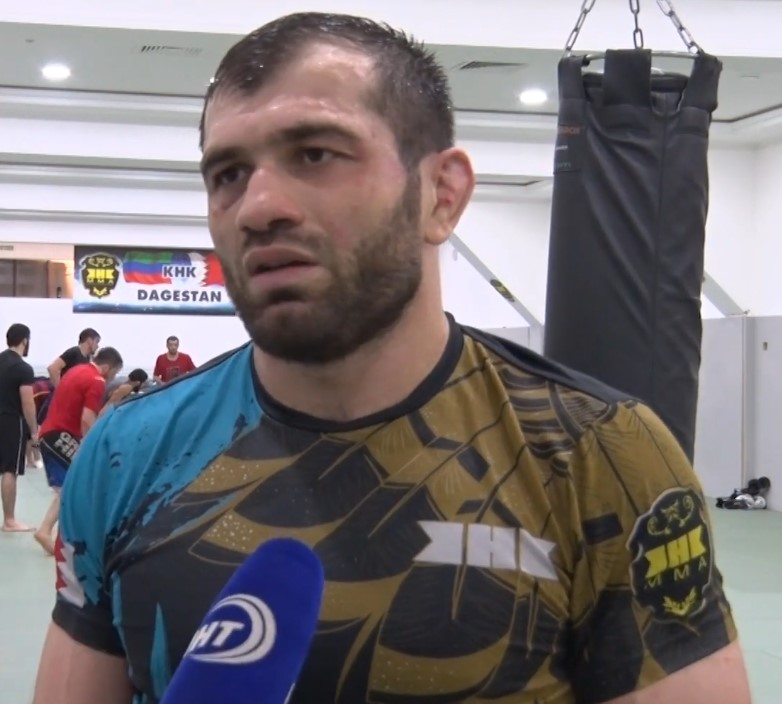
RAF head of international events Eldar Eldarov

RAF disclosed $8 million in new capital funding on May 21, 2026.

RAF Undiscovered was unveiled on May 28, 2026, a reality series where the winner will be awarded a RAF contract.

Bahrain national team coach Eldar Eldarov was hired as the promotion's head of international events on June 3, 2026.

RAF Clubs launched on June 16, 2026, a chain of wrestling academies owned and operated by the promotion.

RAF Georgia would be the promotion's first international event, taking place on July 11, 2026.

RAF Moscow, which took place on September 5, 2026 and was held amid ongoing U.S. sanctions against Russia related to the Russian invasion of Ukraine, would be the first Real American Freestyle event which Fox Nation declined to broadcast.

Following the 2026 World Wrestling Championships in Astana, Kazakhstan, Khadzhimurat Gatsalov, head coach of the Russian national freestyle wrestling team, stated that he would no longer permit national team members to compete in the RAF. Gatsalov claimed that three wrestlers—Abdulrashid Sadulaev, Ibragim Kadiev, and Ismail Khaniev—who had taken part in RAF events were supposedly unable to properly prepare for the national team program because they had instead attended an RAF-oriented training camp. As a result, they allegedly missed the full preparation cycle held by the national team in the mountains. He emphasized a strict policy going forward: athletes selected through the Russian National Championships would only be allowed to compete in ranking tournaments designated by the coaching staff. However, Khadzimurat also started that he still allows the non-first choice national athletes to compete in RAF.

Despite Gatsalov statement, the CEO and co-founder of RAF, Chad Bronstein, stated that Russian wrestlers remain part of the promotion’s roster and are scheduled to compete in upcoming events. One of the confirmed matchups is a light heavyweight contest between Sadulaev and Dauren Kurugliev at the RAF event in Abu Dhabi. Another match in Abu Dhabi involves Kyle Snyder is scheduled to defend the RAF Light Heavyweight Championship against Shamil Erdogan, a former Turkey freestyle wrestler whose bronze medal from the 2014 World Wrestling Championships was stripped due to the use of stanozolol.

== Corporate governance and executives ==
RAF parent company Real American Wrestling, Inc. is structured as a corporation, with the following individuals having served in various roles.

=== Chief executive officer ===
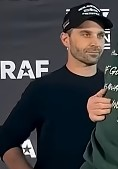
RAF chairman and CEO Chad Bronstein

- Chad Bronstein, co-founder (December 2025 – present)

Former chief executive officers:

- Terri Francis, co-founder (May 2025 – August 2025)

=== Chairman of the board ===
- Chad Bronstein, co-founder (May 2026 – present)

=== Chief operating officer ===
- Izzy Martinez (May 2025 – present)

=== Chief media officer ===
- Eric Bischoff (May 2025 – present)

=== Board of directors ===
- Chad Bronstein, co-founder (May 2025 – December 2025, May 2026 – present)
- Alexander Crisses, managing director of General Atlantic (May 2026 – present)
- Arjun Kapur, vice president of Left Lane Capital (May 2026 – present)
- Jonathan Lubert, chairman of Belgravia Management (May 2026 – present)
- Harley Miller, founder of Left Lane Capital (May 2026 – present)

Former board members:

- Hulk Hogan, co-founder (May 2025 – July 2025)

Hogan died on July 24, 2025 at the age of 71.

== Weight divisions and current champions ==
RAF champions as of November 14, 2026.

=== Men ===
Division	Weight	Champion	Since	Days	Defenses
Heavyweight	285 lb (129 kg)	(United States) Wyatt Hendrickson	August 30, 2025	448	2
Light Heavyweight	215 lb (98 kg)	(United States) Kyle Snyder	March 28, 2026	238	5
Light Heavyweight Crossover	215 lb (98 kg)	(United Arab Emirates) Khamzat Chimaev	November 14, 2026	7	0
Cruiserweight	190 lb (86 kg)	(United States) Kyle Dake	August 30, 2025	448	6
Cruiserweight Crossover	190 lb (86 kg)	(United States) Colby Covington	July 18, 2026	126	1
Middleweight	175 lb (79 kg)	(United States) Jason Nolf	August 22, 2026	91	1
Middleweight Crossover	175 lb (79 kg)	(Armenia) Arman Tsarukyan	October 23, 2026	29	0
Welterweight	165 lb (75 kg)	vacant	—	—	—
Lightweight	155 lb (70 kg)	(United States) Ridge Lovett	October 23, 2026	29	0
Lightweight Crossover	155 lb (70 kg)	(United States) Henry Cejudo	August 22, 2026	91	0
Featherweight	145 lb (66 kg)	(United States) Real Woods	May 30, 2026	175	0
Featherweight Crossover	145 lb (66 kg)	(United States) Cayden Henschel	September 18, 2026	64	0
Bantamweight	135 lb (61 kg)	(Armenia) Arsen Harutyunyan	September 18, 2026	64	0

=== Women ===
Division	Weight	Champion	Since	Days	Defenses
Middleweight	150 lb (68 kg)	(United States) Kennedy Blades	November 29, 2025	357	5
Bantamweight	130 lb (59 kg)	(United States) Helen Maroulis	October 25, 2025	392	2
Strawweight	120 lb (54 kg)	(Ecuador) Lucía Yépez	June 23, 2026	121	2

== Wrestler salaries and contracts ==
RAF allows those who excelled in high school wrestling, collegiate wrestling, and Olympic wrestling to profit from the sport. Salaries are not publicly disclosed, with some contracts providing wrestlers both “show” money to compete, and additional “win” money if they are victorious. RAF provides performance bonuses for each event, with compensation structures varying by athlete contract, including show/win money and NIL sponsorship deals.

USA Wrestling is a partner organization, allowing active NCAA wrestlers to compete in RAF and receive compensation through NIL sponsorships without it affecting their eligibility.

Ultimate Fighting Championship (UFC) has a working relationship with RAF that allows their contracted mixed martial artists to wrestle for the promotion.

== Rules ==
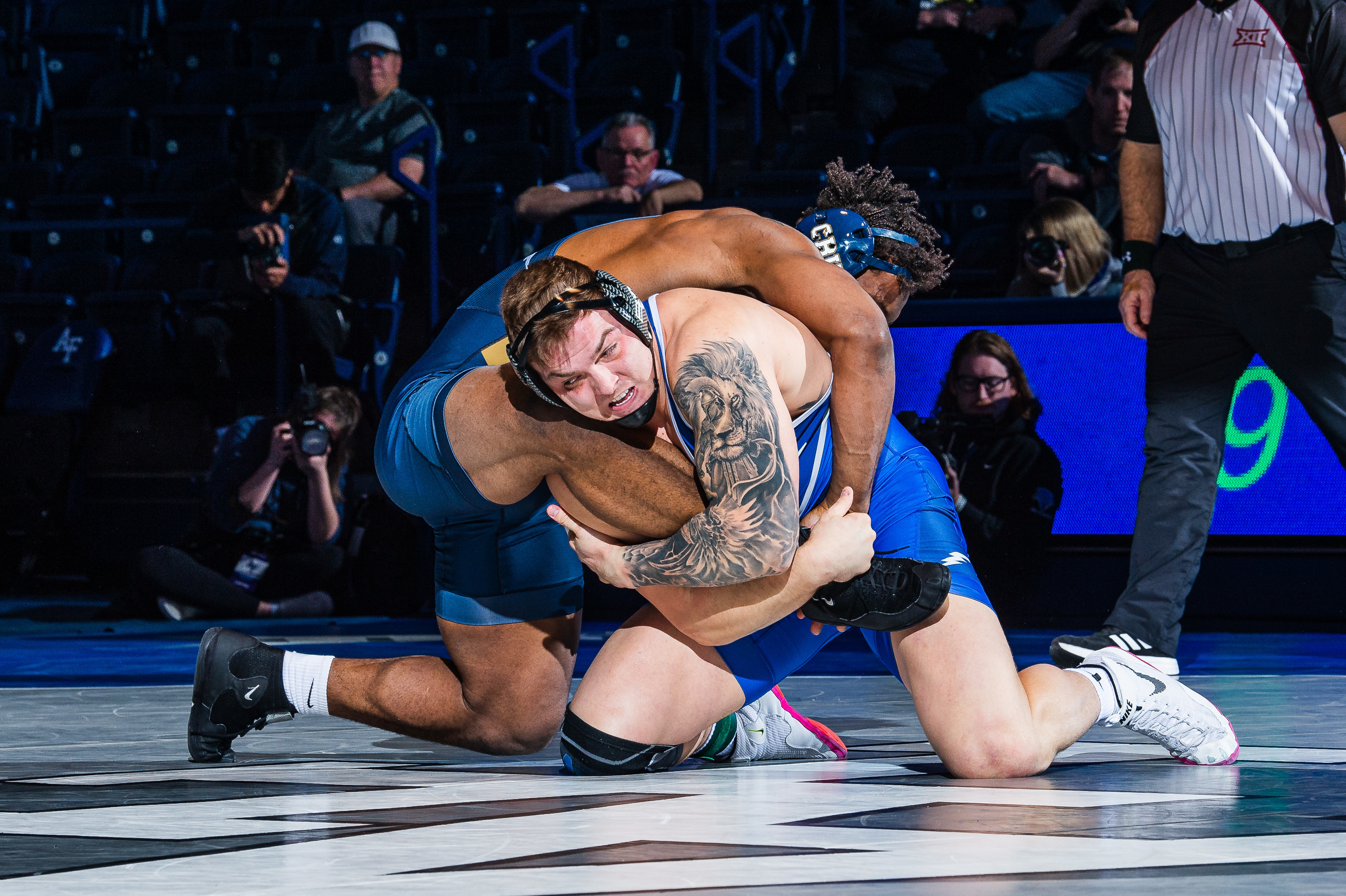
RAF signee Wyatt Hendrickson (right) performing a single leg takedown

RAF utilizes modified United World Wrestling (UWW) and USA Wrestling rules for freestyle wrestling.

Weigh-ins are performed on the same day as an event. Prior to RAF 05, they had been held the day before an event.

Each RAF event features matches that have three two-minute periods, with a 30-second break between periods.

Matches can end during regulation if a pinfall occurs, or if a technical fall is awarded when one competitor gains a 10-point lead over their opponent. If a match does not end before time expires, the competitor with the highest score at the end of regulation is declared the winner. There is no overtime, and in the event of a tie score at the end of regulation, the competitor who last scored points is declared the victor.

The following point system is administered by the league:

- Exposure (from Standing): Executing a throw while standing that exposes your opponent's back to the mat is 4 or 5 points.
- Exposure (from Ground): Turning your opponent onto their back is 2 points.
- Takedown: Bringing your opponent to the mat and controlling them is 2 points.
- Reversal: Maneuvering from bottom to top position is 1 point.
- Stepout: Forcing your opponent completely out of bounds is 1 point. Beginning with RAF 05, the league adopted UWW’s rule change that prohibits competitors from dropping to their knees defensively to avoid a stepout being called.
- Shot Clock: Failure of a competitor to score in 30 seconds after the official has warned them for being too passive results in 1 point awarded to their opponent.
- Caution: Stoppages caused by a competitor's fleeing, unsportsmanlike conduct, or abuse of injury timeouts results in 1 point awarded to their opponent.

Competitors can challenge an official's call using video review. If a call is upheld, that competitor loses the ability to challenge again for the rest of the match, and their opponent is awarded 1 point. Challenges were previously eliminated from RAF 05 to RAF 08, during which time a matside Refereeing Delegate of UWW was able to overrule a referee’s scoring.

RAF has implemented an anti-doping policy, following regulations established by the United States Anti-Doping Agency (USADA) and World Anti-Doping Agency (WADA). Testing for substances on WADA’s prohibited list is conducted in and out of competition, with mandatory post-match urine samples. Penalties for violations may include disqualification, suspension, fine, termination, or lifetime ban.

== RAF events ==
The first event, RAF 01, took place in August 2025. As of November 2026, 17 events have taken place.

=== List of events ===
The list of events are taken from the organization's events page on their website.

==== Scheduled events ====
#	Event	Date	Venue	Location
20	RAF 17	January 23, 2027	Bojangles Coliseum	Charlotte, North Carolina, U.S.
19	RAF 16: Chimaev vs. Evans	December 19, 2026	Nassau Coliseum	Uniondale, New York, U.S.
18	RAF 15: Cejudo vs. Song	November 28, 2026	Now Arena	Chicago, Illinois, U.S.

==== Past events ====
#	Event	Date	Venue	Location
17	RAF Abu Dhabi: Chimaev vs. Weidman	November 14, 2026	Etihad Arena	Abu Dhabi, United Arab Emirates
16	RAF 14: Tsarukyan vs. Danis	October 23, 2026	Fontainebleau Las Vegas	Las Vegas, Nevada, U.S.
15	RAF 13: Covington vs Muhammad	September 18, 2026	Watsco Center	Miami, Florida, U.S.
14	RAF Moscow: Chimaev vs. Woodley	September 5, 2026	Mytishchi Arena	Moscow, Russia
13	RAF 12: Dvalishvili vs. Cejudo 2	August 22, 2026	Rocket Arena	Cleveland, Ohio, U.S.
12	RAF 11: Tsarukyan vs. Covington	July 18, 2026	UW–Milwaukee Panther Arena	Milwaukee, Wisconsin, U.S.
11	RAF Georgia: Dvalishvili vs. Cejudo	July 11, 2026	Tbilisi Arena	Tbilisi, Georgia
10	RAF 10: Chimaev vs. Danis	June 13, 2026	Chaifetz Arena	St. Louis, Missouri, U.S.
9	RAF 09: Steveson vs. Romanov	May 30, 2026	College Park Center	Dallas, Texas, U.S.
8	RAF 08: Tsarukyan vs. Faber	April 18, 2026	Liacouras Center	Philadelphia, Pennsylvania, U.S.
7	RAF 07: Tsarukyan vs. Poullas	March 28, 2026	Yuengling Center	Tampa, Florida, U.S.
6	RAF 06: Cejudo vs. Faber	February 28, 2026	Mullett Arena	Tempe, Arizona, U.S.
5	RAF 05: Covington vs. Rockhold	January 10, 2026	Amerant Bank Arena	Miami, Florida, U.S.
4	RAF 04: Hendrickson vs. Parris	December 20, 2025	Fishers Event Center	Fishers, Indiana, U.S.
3	RAF 03: Mendes vs. Chandler	November 29, 2025	Wintrust Arena	Chicago, Illinois, U.S.
2	RAF 02: Dake vs. Makoev	October 25, 2025	Bryce Jordan Center	State College, Pennsylvania, U.S.
1	RAF 01: Hendrickson vs. Elders	August 29, 2025	Wolstein Center	Cleveland, Ohio, U.S.

=== Production team ===
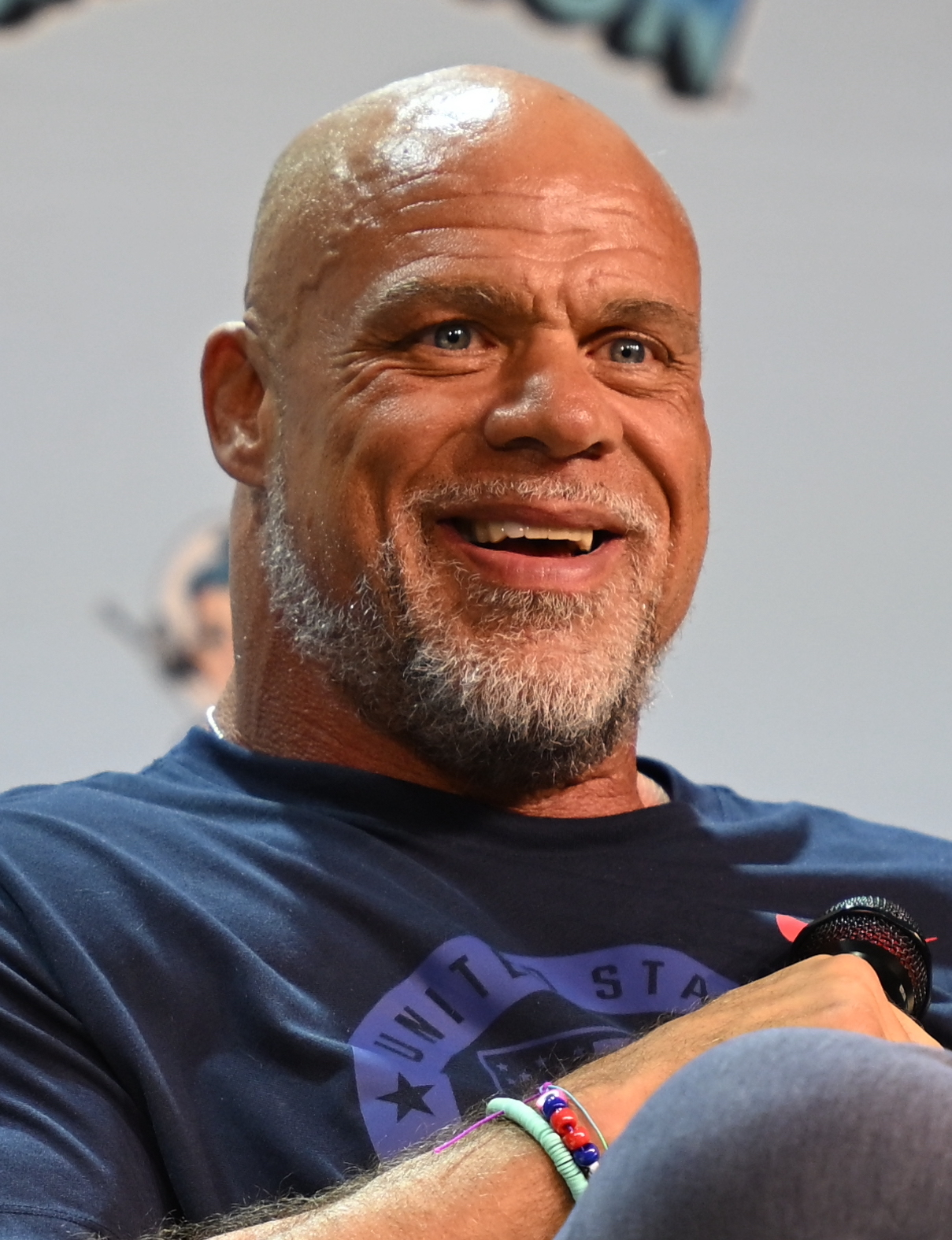
RAF commentator Kurt Angle

RAF's matchmaking committee is composed of co-founder and CEO Chad Bronstein, COO Izzy Martinez, head of talent development Lance Palmer, vice president of talent development Willie Saylor, and ambassador Ben Askren.

The commentary team consists of Shane Sparks as play-by-play analyst, Chael Sonnen as color analyst and post-match interviewer, Julianna Peña as undercard color commentator, and Kurt Angle as main event color commentator. Ben Askren provides remote analysis.

Nick Hogan is on-air commissioner. McKenzie Mitchell is ring announcer. Alexis Wilkins performs live renditions of “The Star-Spangled Banner” prior to every RAF event. Brantley Gilbert wrote and recorded the promotion's theme song, “Real American”.

== Media rights ==
Fox Nation acquired exclusive broadcast rights to air the promotion's flagship events on July 21, 2025. They later extended their exclusive broadcast rights agreement for airing RAF’s flagship events on January 22, 2026.

On May 28, 2026, Fox Nation acquired the exclusive broadcast rights to air RAF Next Gen youth events.

Fox Nation added exclusive broadcast rights to air the promotion's international events on June 15, 2026.

The reality series RAF Undiscovered will also air exclusively on Fox Nation.
