= Imam Ganishov =

Russian freestyle wrestler

Personal information
- Native name: Имам Гасанович Ганишов
- Full name: Imam Gasanovich Ganishov
- Born: 17 June 2000 (age 26) Dagestan, Russia
- Height: 1.75 m (5 ft 9 in)
- Weight: 74 kg (163 lb; 11.7 st)

Sport
- Country: Russia
- Sport: Amateur wrestling
- Event: Freestyle
- Club: Olympic training center (Khasavyurt, Dagestan)
Medal record
Men's freestyle wrestling
Representing Individual Neutral Athletes
European Championships
Bronze medal – third place	2024 Bucharest	74 kg
World U23 Championships
Silver medal – second place	2023 Tirana	74 kg
Representing Russia
World Cadets Championships
Bronze medal – third place	2017 Athens	54 kg

Imam Ganishov (Russian: Имам Гасанович Ганишов; born 17 June 2000) is a Russian freestyle wrestler who currently competes at 74 kilograms.

== Wrestling career ==
Ganishov won one of the bronze medals in the men's 74 kg event at the 2024 European Wrestling Championships held in Bucharest, Romania. He defeated Murad Kuramagomedov of Hungary in his bronze medal match.

== Achievements ==
Year	Tournament	Location	Result	Event
2024	European Championships	Bucharest, Romania	3rd	Freestyle 74 kg
