= DraftKings =

American gambling company

DraftKings Inc.
- Type: Public
- Traded as: Nasdaq: DKNG (Class A); Russell 1000 component
- Industry: Online gambling; Daily fantasy sports; Sports betting
- Founded: 2012; 14 years ago Boston, Massachusetts, U.S.
- Founders: Jason Robins; Matt Kalish; Paul Liberman
- Headquarters: Boston, Massachusetts, U.S.
- Key people: Jason Robins (CEO); Paul Liberman (COO); Matt Kalish (CRO)
- Products: SportsBook, Online Casino, and Daily Fantasy Sports
- Revenue: ▲US$4.77 billion (2024)
- Operating income: ▲US$−609 million (2024)
- Net income: ▲US$−507 million (2024)
- Total assets: ▲US$4.28 billion (2024)
- Total equity: ▲US$1.01 billion (2024)
- Number of employees: 5,100 (2024)
- Website: draftkings.com

DraftKings Inc. is an American digital sports entertainment gambling company based in Boston, Massachusetts. It offers sportsbook and daily fantasy sports (DFS) services.

The company was originally launched in 2012 as a DFS provider, competing principally with the New York–based FanDuel. In May 2018, amid the widening legalization of sports betting in the United States, DraftKings began to expand into online and retail sportsbooks to leverage its brand awareness and customer base.

DraftKings became a publicly traded company through a reverse merger with SBTech, a Bulgarian technology company, and special-purpose acquisition company Diamond Eagle Acquisition Corp in April 2020.

Draft Kings is known as one of the biggest sportsbooks and holds a big portion of the market share in the economy. Draft Kings is legal in 26 states, as of December 2025. In July 2026, Draft Kings filed a lawsuit to halt the city of Philadeliphia's investigation into its sportsbook and online casino.

== History ==
DraftKings was established in 2012 by Jason Robins, Matthew Kalish, and Paul Liberman, former Vistaprint employees. The company initially operated out of Liberman's house. The company's first product was a one-on-one baseball competition, launched to coincide with Major League Baseball's opening day in 2012.

In April 2013, Major League Baseball invested in DraftKings, becoming the first US professional sports league to invest in daily fantasy sports. The investment was not disclosed at the time.

In February 2014, it was reported that the company awarded $50 million in prizes in 2013 to players in weekly fantasy football, daily fantasy baseball, daily fantasy basketball and daily fantasy hockey. The company also reported 50,000 active daily users and as many as one million registered players.

In July 2014, it announced the acquisition of rival DraftStreet, owned at the time by IAC, the third largest player in the fantasy sports space. The acquisition reportedly increased DraftKings' user base by 50%. The company announced it would keep the DraftStreet NY office open and retain some employees.

In August 2014, the company announced $41 million in funding from a variety of investors, including the Raine Group, as well as existing investors Redpoint Ventures, GGV Capital, and Accomplice. The company also announced that it was acquiring the assets of Somerville, Massachusetts, competitor StarStreet.

In November 2014, DraftKings reached a two-year deal to become the official daily fantasy sports service of the National Hockey League. The deal included sponsorships of video features and other content across the NHL's digital outlets, co-branded free games with fan-oriented prizes, and in-venue ad placements during marquee NHL events. Yahoo! Sports remained the league's official season-length fantasy sports provider.

In April 2015, DraftKings reached a similar deal with Major League Baseball. The agreement allowed DraftKings to offer co-branded MLB daily fantasy games and extend its relationships with individual MLB clubs to offer in-stadium fantasy-related experiences. The company also announced it had received $304 million in users' entry fees in 2014.

In July 2015, DraftKings entered into a three-year advertising deal with ESPN Inc. valued at $250 million. This deal included "integration" of the service within ESPN's television and digital content, and having exclusivity in advertising DFS services on its networks beginning in January 2016.

Also in July 2015, DraftKings announced a round of funding totaling $300 million, led by Fox Sports, along with the Kraft Group, owners of the New England Patriots, and Boston financial giant Wellington Management. The agreement included a condition stating that DraftKings would spend $250 million on advertising with Fox Sports over the next three years. Due to the acquisition of 21st Century Fox by Disney in March 2019, Fox's stake is now owned by the Walt Disney Company.

In August 2015, DraftKings announced that it had been granted a license by the Gambling Commission in the United Kingdom to operate pool wagering services and that it planned to open an office in London. The company also hired Jeffrey Haas, a veteran of the online poker industry, to serve as Chief International Officer to lead the company's international expansion. DraftKings officially launched in the UK on February 5, 2016, with daily fantasy soccer. As part of the launch, DraftKings enhanced its handling of soccer on the platform to appeal to the local audience. The following year, DraftKings was subsequently awarded a controlled skill games license in Malta, which would allow the service to expand into any European Union (EU) country that allows gambling services to operate under licensing from another EU country, such as Germany.

On October 5, 2015, an article in The New York Times indicated that an employee at DraftKings admitted to inadvertently releasing data before the start of week three's NFL football games. That same employee had won $350,000 on rival fantasy site FanDuel the same week. An internal review concluded the employee obtained the data after lineups were locked and couldn't have used that data for an unfair advantage. Both DraftKings and FanDuel released statements saying that "Nothing is more important... than the integrity of the games we offer to our customers," and they would work with the entire fantasy sports industry "so that fans everywhere can continue to enjoy and trust the games they love." The following day, New York attorney general Eric Schneiderman opened an inquiry into DraftKings and FanDuel, asking each site for a range of internal data and details on how they prevent fraud. ESPN announced on October 6 that they would no longer be running segments sponsored by DraftKings, though paid DraftKings advertisements would continue.

In February 2016, ESPN backed out of its advertising deal with DraftKings due to the legal uncertainties surrounding the service.

On May 2, 2016, Lawrence Wasden, the Idaho attorney general, banned DraftKings and FanDuel from operating in the state, calling them illegal gambling.

On November 18, 2016, DraftKings and FanDuel announced their intent to merge. The combined company would serve over five million users. On June 19, 2017, the Federal Trade Commission (FTC) announced that it would seek a preliminary injunction to block the proposed merger. The FTC felt that the proposed transaction would give the combined company 90% of the U.S. DFS market, which is considered to be a monopoly position. On July 13, 2017, the merger was officially called off due to the threat of litigation from the FTC.

In September 2017, DraftKings and FanDuel each paid $1.3 million to settle with the Massachusetts Attorney General's office over allegations of unfair and deceptive practices by the companies prior to 2016.

=== 2018–present: expansion into sports betting ===
In May 2018, the Professional and Amateur Sports Protection Act of 1992 was declared unconstitutional by the Supreme Court of the United States, allowing states outside of Nevada to legalize sports betting. In August 2018, DraftKings launched its first legal online sportsbook in New Jersey. Since launching in New Jersey, DraftKings has opened sports betting operations nationwide.

In April 2020, DraftKings completed a reverse merger valued at $3.3 billion that made it a publicly traded company. The merger involved Diamond Eagle Acquisition Corp., a special-purpose acquisition company that went public in May 2019, as well as SBTech Global Ltd., a Europe-based company providing technology solutions for sports betting businesses. The combined company keeps both DraftKings' name and its executive management. On April 24, 2020, the company's shares started trading on the Nasdaq stock exchange under the ticker symbol "DKNG". Hindenburg Research later published a report alleging that SBTech, which accounted for around 25% of DraftKing's revenue at the SPAC consummation, has ties to organized crime in Bulgaria and illegal gambling around the world.

In September 2020, retired NBA player Michael Jordan became an investor and board advisor at DraftKings. In March 2021, DraftKings acquired the Vegas Stats & Information Network (VSiN), a Las Vegas-based radio network and digital media platform oriented towards sports betting news and analysis, from the family of sportscaster Brent Musburger. In December 2021, DraftKings was sued by Colossus Bets for patent infringement. Colossus claimed DraftKings infringed seven patents related to a cash-out feature in their sports betting and gaming products.

On September 11, 2023, DraftKings issued an apology for a controversial promotion that used the 22nd anniversary of the September 11 attacks to encourage betting on games involving New York-based teams. The promotion, which was criticized for exploiting a national tragedy for business, was quickly removed following public backlash.

In 2021, DraftKings agreed to pay at least $50 million over a three-year period to distribute a sports and pop-culture podcast hosted by Dan Le Batard. The agreement marks the first major licensing deal struck by Meadowlark Media, founded by Le Batard. The podcast averages around 10 to 12 million downloads monthly. As of July 2021, DraftKings reached a market capitalization of $20.64 billion.

In May 2022, DraftKings acquired Golden Nugget Online Gaming. In February 2024, the company acquired lottery courier app Jackpocket for $750 million. In July 2024, DraftKings sold VSiN back to the Musburger family.

In September 2024, the company was fined $200,000 by the Securities and Exchange Commission (SEC) for violating Regulation Fair Disclosure when the company's PR team shared material, non-public information about revenue growth on CEO Jason Robins's personal LinkedIn and X (formerly Twitter) accounts before its official earnings release.

In December 2024, US senators Mike Lee and Peter Welch sent a letter to the FTC and US Department of Justice accusing DraftKings and FanDuel of conspiring to "obstruct or impair competition" in violation of federal antitrust law and encouraging an investigation of the companies' actions following their failed merger in 2016.

For Q4 2024, DraftKings reported a $200 million net loss despite a 13% year-over-year revenue increase to $1.39 billion, bringing its full-year losses to $507 million. The company secured a $500 million loan to support expansion, with a focus on iGaming regulatory challenges.

In June 2025, DraftKings filed with the Federal Election Commission to establish a corporate political action committee "to support state and federal candidates and organizations who have shown an interest in issues affecting our business."

In October 2025, DraftKings announced a deal to acquire predictions platform Railbird. The terms of the deal were not disclosed.

In November 2025, ESPN announced an agreement with DraftKings to make it the official sports betting and odds provider for its platforms. The agreement came after ESPN and Penn Entertainment announced that they would unwind their partnership on ESPN Bet.

In December 2025, DraftKings officially launched "DraftKings Predictions", a prediction-markets platform that allows users to bet on and trade contracts tied to the outcomes of sporting events and other real-world occurrences.

A 2026 investigative report by ProPublica found that DraftKings encouraged compulsive gambling. A ProPublica reporter mimicked the behavior of gambling addicts, finding that DraftKings encouraged more problematic gambling from the user rather than reining the user in.

== Political activity ==
DraftKings spent $420,000 in political lobbying in 2024. It donated $502,000 to Donald Trump's 2025 inaugural committee. In June 2025, DraftKings launched DraftKings PAC, a corporate political action committee. As of August 2026, the organization spent $34.8 million in the 2026 United States elections, primarily donating to the pro-gambling super PAC Win for America.

== Legal issues ==
In September 2023, DraftKings suspended the use of credit cards as a payment method. This was following regulatory penalties by the Massachusetts Gaming Commission for violations in 2023 and 2024.

In December 2024, a lawsuit was filed by the spouse and children of a gambler who used the DraftKings platform, alleging that the company actively encouraged a known problem gambler's addiction, leading him to lose over $900,000. The case argues that online betting platforms have a duty to identify and exclude compulsive gamblers.

The same month, a former client named Jeffrey Wan filed a class action lawsuit against DraftKings in New York federal court, alleging that the company unlawfully shared users' personally identifiable information (PII) with third parties. Wan claims that DraftKings used the Facebook pixel tracking tool to record and send users' website and app activity to Facebook.

Later in December 2024, Texas resident Eric Avila filed a class action lawsuit in the US District Court for the District of Massachusetts, alleging that DraftKings fraudulently closed users' accounts and stole their remaining balances. Avila claims that DraftKings terminated his account under false pretenses and that he was unable to get his money back.

In April 2025, the city of Baltimore, Maryland, filed a lawsuit against DraftKings and FanDuel, alleging that the companies are engaging in "deceptive and unfair practices by targeting and exploiting vulnerable gamblers in violation of Baltimore's Consumer Protection Ordinance (CPO)." In May 2025, a class action lawsuit was filed in Pennsylvania, also citing DraftKings deceptive promotions and predatory advertising. In 2026 DraftKings and FanDuel were sued in California for using predatory practices to encourage compulsive gambling.

In early July 2026, Samuel Silverman, a former DraftKings sports trader, was criminally charged in Nevada over an alleged betting scheme. The ex-DraftKings employee was arrested in Las Vegas on 5 May and pleaded not guilty.
