= Albania–Iran relations =

- Albania: Iran

Albania and Iran currently have no diplomatic relations. In 2013, the People's Mojahedin Organization of Iran (MEK) moved its base to Albania, which strained diplomatic relations. Albanian Prime Minister Edi Rama announced on 7 September 2022 that Albania would cut diplomatic relations with Iran in retaliation for a major cyber attack by Iran on the country. All staff at the Iranian embassy in Tirana were ordered to leave Albania. On 1 February 2024, Albania accused a hacker group "backed" by the Iranian government of carrying out an attack on the country's Institute of Statistics.

== History ==
Albania and Iran are both Indo-European countries with various cultural similarities, whose cultural relations date back to the ancient Illyrian and Iranian peoples. The Illyrians were largely involved in the military defense of Greece against the Achaemenid Empire, while maintaining cultural exchanges among the Greeks.

=== Pahlavi Iran and Communist Albania ===
Due to distance between the two countries, it was unclear when the two countries first established relations, though it is highly likely the relations began following World War II, when Albania became a communist state and Iran was under the Pahlavi dynasty. Albania was a communist state and it aligned with the Soviet Union, while Pahlavi Iran allied with the United States throughout the early phase of Cold War.

=== Islamic Republic of Iran and Communist Albania ===
Following the establishment of Islamic theocracy in Iran at 1979, Albania, being a communist state, aligned with the Soviets against Iran in the Iran–Iraq War.

=== Kosovo War ===
At first, Iran sought to gain support from Albanians by fighting in the Kosovo War. There were reports of Iranian fighters in Kosovo, along with Iranian media sharing news of Albanians expressing gratitude for Iran's support and interest in creating a similar theocratic state. This approach is similar to how Iran gained support from the Bosniaks during the Bosnian War. However, Iranian president Muhammad Khatami had strongly opposed the NATO bombing of Yugoslavia in 1999 and condemned NATO harshly.

Albania's close ties with the United States began to strain its relationship with Iran. In 2002, Iran founded the "Koran Foundation of Kosovo" with aim to drive Albanians in both Albania and Kosovo to abandon its secularism and support a Shi'a theocracy, but it was unsuccessful; Albanian police even launched crackdowns on the foundation. Since 2008 Iran has refused to recognize the independence of Kosovo.

=== People's Mujahedin of Iran ===
Albania's decision to welcome People's Mujahedin of Iran (MEK) taking refuge in the country led to increased tensions between Albania and Iran. The MEK has been in conflict with the Islamic Republic government since the early 1980s, and is regarded a terrorist organization there. On March 27, 2025, a bipartisan group of U.S. senators introduced Resolution 145 to support Iranian political refugees in Ashraf-3, Albania. In 2021, Facebook said that it deleted over 300 accounts from a network associated with the MEK. The group denied the existence of an Albanian troll farm connected to the MEK. Albanian President Ilir Meta dismissed the Iranian claim, and condemned the Iranian government.

Albania accused Iran of plotting terrorist attacks in the country during the 2018 FIFA World Cup qualification, and expelled Iranian diplomats in response, including the Iranian ambassador. Iran, in response, accused Albania of fabrication under American and Israeli pressure.

In January 2020, following the assassination of Iranian general Qasem Soleimani, Iranian supreme leader Ali Khamenei and Iranian president Hassan Rouhani made speeches smearing "a small and sinister country" for trying to overthrow the Islamic regime in Iran, which was believed to be directed at Albania due to MEK's refugee status. Albanian Prime Minister Edi Rama openly endorsed an attack against Iran by the U.S. in response to Iranian criticism against Albania.

=== Cyberattack and severed ties ===
On 15 July 2022 Albania suffered a serious cyberattack, which temporarily shut down numerous Albanian government digital services and websites. The Albanian government advised the purpose of the attack was in a bid to "destroy it, paralyse public services and hack data and electronic communications from the government systems", but ultimately the attack failed.

The attack was identified by cybersecurity firm Mandiant as having been conducted by agents that had previously acted on behalf of Iran. Iran publicly denied responsibility of the attacks, framing the attacks as "anti-Iranian" and alleging that "third parties" had maligned Iran through creating allegations of Iranian hacking. The Albanian government has responded by announcing that they were working with Microsoft and the FBI in an investigation into the cyberattack.

On 7 September 2022, Albanian Prime Minister Edi Rama announced Albania would sever relations with the Islamic Republic of Iran in response to a cyberattack conducted by Iran against the Albanian state. All embassy staff, including diplomatic and security personnel, were ordered to leave Albania within 24 hours, in note delivered to the Iranian embassy in Tirana.

The United States soon after declared that they will take "further action" in response to the attack on a NATO ally.

Turkey, through its embassy in Tehran, currently represents Albania's interest in Iran.

On the 1 February 2024, Albania suffered another round of cyberattacks from Iran, with the latest round of cyberattacks targeting INSTAT, Albania's statistical gathering apparatus.

== See also ==
- Foreign relations of Albania
- Foreign relations of Iran
