= 2023 U23 World Wrestling Championships =

Wrestling Championship

- Host city: Tirana, Albania
- Dates: 23–29 October
- Stadium: Tirana Olympic Park

Champions
- Freestyle: United States
- Greco-Roman: Turkey
- Women: Japan

The 2023 U23 World Wrestling Championships was the sixth edition of the U23 World Wrestling Championships of combined events and was held from 23 to 29 October 2023 in Tirana, Albania. United World Wrestling (UWW) authorized some Russian wrestlers to participate in the World Championships though they had participated in the pro-war rally and expressed their support for the Russo-Ukrainian war. UWW explained its decision to clear them for the World Championships by stating that their participation in certain events was not of their own will and their support for the war and the policy of their government could not be certainly concluded. After Albania was specified as the host, the Albanian government announced that the Iranian wrestling team will not receive visas due to the IRGC's cyber attacks on the Albanian government and Iran-Albania relations.

== Iranian visa problems ==
After Albania was specified as the host, the Albanian government announced that the Iranian wrestling team will not receive visas due to the IRGC's cyber attacks on the Albanian government and Iran-Albania relations.

== Medal table ==
* Host nation (Albania)

Rank	Nation	Gold	Silver	Bronze	Total
–	Individual Neutral Athletes (Note: As a result of sanctions imposed following the 2022 Russian invasion of Ukraine, wrestlers from Russia and Belarus were not permitted to use the name, flag, or anthem of Russia or Belarus. They instead participated as Individual Neutral Athletes (Athlètes Individuels Neutres in French) according to an IOC decision implemented by the UWW. No flags at all were used for these delegations, not even the UWW flag. The UWW does not include the medals won by these wrestlers in the official medal table, they results were not counted in the team rankings.)	11	4	8	23
1	Japan	5	3	4	12
2	United States	5	2	2	9
3	Turkey	3	4	5	12
4	Moldova	2	3	1	6
5	Ukraine	1	3	5	9
6	United World Wrestling (Note: As a result of sanctions by the UWW imposed on the Wrestling Federation of India for not conducting its elections on time, wrestlers from India were not permitted to use the name, flag, or anthem of India. They instead participated under the name and the flag of the United World Wrestling (UWW).)	1	2	6	9
7	Kazakhstan	1	2	2	5
8	Georgia	1	1	3	5
9	Azerbaijan	0	4	7	11
10	Armenia	0	1	2	3
11	Croatia	0	1	1	2
12	Kyrgyzstan	0	0	3	3
13	Germany	0	0	2	2
14	Egypt	0	0	1	1
14	France	0	0	1	1
14	Greece	0	0	1	1
14	Hungary	0	0	1	1
14	Lithuania	0	0	1	1
14	Mongolia	0	0	1	1
14	Poland	0	0	1	1
14	Romania	0	0	1	1
14	Sweden	0	0	1	1
Totals (22 entries)		30	30	60	120

== Team ranking ==
Rank	Men's freestyle		Men's Greco-Roman		Women's freestyle	
Rank	Team	Points	Team	Points	Team	Points
1	United States	148	Turkey	121	Japan	159
2	Turkey	113	Azerbaijan	93	Ukraine	146
3	Azerbaijan	87	Georgia	78	United World Wrestling	134
4	United World Wrestling	86	Armenia	77	United States	95
5	Japan	71	Kazakhstan	63	Turkey	80
6	Moldova	66	Ukraine	62	Canada	58
7	Georgia	64	Japan	47	Kazakhstan	56
8	Kazakhstan	60	Moldova	44	Moldova	51
9	Armenia	51	United World Wrestling	43	Azerbaijan	35
10	Kyrgyzstan	36	Kyrgyzstan	41	Romania	31

== Medal summary ==
=== Men's freestyle ===
Event	Gold	Silver	Bronze
57 kg	Nachyn Mongush; Authorised Neutral Athletes	Manvel Khndzrtsyan; Armenia	Bekzat Almaz Uulu; Kyrgyzstan
57 kg	Nachyn Mongush; Authorised Neutral Athletes	Manvel Khndzrtsyan; Armenia	Batkhuyagiin Mönkh-Erdene; Mongolia
61 kg	Bashir Magomedov; Authorised Neutral Athletes	Assylzhan Yessengeldi; Kazakhstan	Mezhlum Mezhlumyan; Armenia
61 kg	Bashir Magomedov; Authorised Neutral Athletes	Assylzhan Yessengeldi; Kazakhstan	Taiyrbek Zhumashbek Uulu; Kyrgyzstan
65 kg	Ibragim Ibragimov; Authorised Neutral Athletes	Ziraddin Bayramov; Azerbaijan	Brock Hardy; United States
65 kg	Ibragim Ibragimov; Authorised Neutral Athletes	Ziraddin Bayramov; Azerbaijan	Abdullah Toprak; Turkey
70 kg	Inalbek Sheriev; Authorised Neutral Athletes	Yoshinosuke Aoyagi; Japan	Giorgi Elbakidze; Georgia
70 kg	Inalbek Sheriev; Authorised Neutral Athletes	Yoshinosuke Aoyagi; Japan	Kanan Heybatov; Azerbaijan
74 kg	Keegan O'Toole; United States	Imam Ganishov; Authorised Neutral Athletes	Hikaru Takata; Japan
74 kg	Keegan O'Toole; United States	Imam Ganishov; Authorised Neutral Athletes	Naveen Malik; United World Wrestling
79 kg	Magomed Magomaev; Authorised Neutral Athletes	Ashraf Ashirov; Azerbaijan	Vladimeri Gamkrelidze; Georgia
79 kg	Magomed Magomaev; Authorised Neutral Athletes	Ashraf Ashirov; Azerbaijan	Sagar Jaglan; United World Wrestling
86 kg	Aaron Brooks; United States	Tatsuya Shirai; Japan	Arslan Bagaev; Authorised Neutral Athletes
86 kg	Aaron Brooks; United States	Tatsuya Shirai; Japan	Joshua Morodion; Germany
92 kg	Muhammed Gimri; Turkey	Ion Demian; Moldova	Jacob Cardenas; United States
92 kg	Muhammed Gimri; Turkey	Ion Demian; Moldova	Abduljalil Shabanov; Azerbaijan
97 kg	Isaac Trumble; United States	Radu Lefter; Moldova	Sergey Kozyrev; Authorised Neutral Athletes
97 kg	Isaac Trumble; United States	Radu Lefter; Moldova	Oktay Çiftçi; Turkey
125 kg	Wyatt Hendrickson; United States	Adil Mısırcı; Turkey	Azamat Khosonov; Greece
125 kg	Wyatt Hendrickson; United States	Adil Mısırcı; Turkey	Vakhit Galayev; Azerbaijan

=== Men's Greco-Roman ===
Event	Gold	Silver	Bronze
55 kg	Giorgi Tokhadze; Georgia	Iskhar Kurbayev; Kazakhstan	Farid Sadikhli; Azerbaijan
55 kg	Giorgi Tokhadze; Georgia	Iskhar Kurbayev; Kazakhstan	Adem Uzun; Turkey
60 kg	Anvar Allakhiarov; Authorised Neutral Athletes	Romeo Beridze; Georgia	Mert İlbars; Turkey
60 kg	Anvar Allakhiarov; Authorised Neutral Athletes	Romeo Beridze; Georgia	Sumit Dalal; United World Wrestling
63 kg	Rakhman Tavmurzaev; Authorised Neutral Athletes	Hleb Makaranka; Authorised Neutral Athletes	Vitalie Eriomenco; Moldova
63 kg	Rakhman Tavmurzaev; Authorised Neutral Athletes	Hleb Makaranka; Authorised Neutral Athletes	Chiezo Maruyama; Japan
67 kg	Sultan Assetuly; Kazakhstan	Mustafa Safa Yıldırım; Turkey	Haruto Yabe; Japan
67 kg	Sultan Assetuly; Kazakhstan	Mustafa Safa Yıldırım; Turkey	Muslim Imadaev; Authorised Neutral Athletes
72 kg	Dmitrii Adamov; Authorised Neutral Athletes	Irfan Mirzoiev; Ukraine	Shant Khachatryan; Armenia
72 kg	Dmitrii Adamov; Authorised Neutral Athletes	Irfan Mirzoiev; Ukraine	Ruslan Nurullayev; Azerbaijan
77 kg	Alexandrin Guțu; Moldova	Khasay Hasanli; Azerbaijan	Khvicha Ananidze; Georgia
77 kg	Alexandrin Guțu; Moldova	Khasay Hasanli; Azerbaijan	Yryskeldi Maksatbek Uulu; Kyrgyzstan
82 kg	Aues Gonibov; Authorised Neutral Athletes	Alperen Berber; Turkey	Emad Abouelatta; Egypt
82 kg	Aues Gonibov; Authorised Neutral Athletes	Alperen Berber; Turkey	Karlo Kodrić; Croatia
87 kg	Magomed Murtazaliev; Authorised Neutral Athletes	Matej Mandić; Croatia	Szymon Szymonowicz; Poland
87 kg	Magomed Murtazaliev; Authorised Neutral Athletes	Matej Mandić; Croatia	István Takács; Hungary
97 kg	Pavel Hlinchuk; Authorised Neutral Athletes	Mustafa Olgun; Turkey	Yuri Nakazato; Japan
97 kg	Pavel Hlinchuk; Authorised Neutral Athletes	Mustafa Olgun; Turkey	Lucas Lazogianis; Germany
130 kg	Hamza Bakır; Turkey	Mykhailo Vyshnyvetskyi; Ukraine	Mikhail Laptev; Authorised Neutral Athletes
130 kg	Hamza Bakır; Turkey	Mykhailo Vyshnyvetskyi; Ukraine	Sarkhan Mammadov; Azerbaijan

=== Women's freestyle ===
Event	Gold	Silver	Bronze
50 kg	Umi Ito; Japan	Audrey Jimenez; United States	Emma Luttenauer; France
50 kg	Umi Ito; Japan	Audrey Jimenez; United States	Elnura Mammadova; Azerbaijan
53 kg	Mako Oono; Japan	Mariana Drăguțan; Moldova	Altyn Shagayeva; Kazakhstan
53 kg	Mako Oono; Japan	Mariana Drăguțan; Moldova	Liliia Malanchuk; Ukraine
55 kg	Umi Imai; Japan	Neha Sharma; United World Wrestling	Aryna Martynava; Authorised Neutral Athletes
55 kg	Umi Imai; Japan	Neha Sharma; United World Wrestling	Andreea Ana; Romania
57 kg	Sara Natami; Japan	Zhala Aliyeva; Azerbaijan	Elvira Kamaloğlu; Turkey
57 kg	Sara Natami; Japan	Zhala Aliyeva; Azerbaijan	Reena Sangwan; United World Wrestling
59 kg	Solomiia Vynnyk; Ukraine	Sena Nagamoto; Japan	Nitika Kataria; United World Wrestling
59 kg	Solomiia Vynnyk; Ukraine	Sena Nagamoto; Japan	Anastasiia Sidelnikova; Authorised Neutral Athletes
62 kg	Yuzuka Inagaki; Japan	Iryna Bondar; Ukraine	Irina Kuznetsova; Kazakhstan
62 kg	Yuzuka Inagaki; Japan	Iryna Bondar; Ukraine	Alina Kasabieva; Authorised Neutral Athletes
65 kg	Irina Rîngaci; Moldova	Amina Tandelova; Authorised Neutral Athletes	Monika Sheoran; United World Wrestling
65 kg	Irina Rîngaci; Moldova	Amina Tandelova; Authorised Neutral Athletes	Yulia Leskovets; Ukraine
68 kg	Nesrin Baş; Turkey	Alina Shauchuk; Authorised Neutral Athletes	Manola Skobelska; Ukraine
68 kg	Nesrin Baş; Turkey	Alina Shauchuk; Authorised Neutral Athletes	Tindra Sjöberg; Sweden
72 kg	Amit Elor; United States	Jyoti Berwal; United World Wrestling	Iryna Zablotska; Ukraine
72 kg	Amit Elor; United States	Jyoti Berwal; United World Wrestling	Viktoryia Radzkova; Authorised Neutral Athletes
76 kg	Reetika Hooda; United World Wrestling	Kennedy Blades; United States	Kamilė Gaučaitė; Lithuania
76 kg	Reetika Hooda; United World Wrestling	Kennedy Blades; United States	Anastasiya Alpyeyeva; Ukraine

== Participating nations ==
564 wrestlers from 54 countries:

1. Individual Neutral Athletes (57)
2. Albania (13) (Host)
3. Armenia (20)
4. Australia (1)
5. Austria (2)
6. Azerbaijan (25)
7. Belgium (4)
8. Bulgaria (7)
9. Canada (19)
10. Chile (1)
11. Croatia (6)
12. Cyprus (1)
13. Czech Republic (2)
14. Egypt (6)
15. Spain (4)
16. Estonia (4)
17. Finland (6)
18. France (10)
19. United Kingdom (1)
20. Guinea-Bissau (1)
21. Georgia (20)
22. Germany (10)
23. Greece (10)
24. Hungary (10)
25. Italy (6)
26. Jordan (2)
27. Japan (29)
28. Kazakhstan (30)
29. Kyrgyzstan (18)
30. Kosovo (1)
31. Saudi Arabia (6)
32. Latvia (3)
33. Lithuania (5)
34. Morocco (1)
35. Moldova (22)
36. Mexico (4)
37. Mongolia (1)
38. North Macedonia (3)
39. Nigeria (1)
40. Norway (2)
41. Philippines (1)
42. Poland (19)
43. Puerto Rico (9)
44. Romania (9)
45. South Africa (2)
46. Serbia (4)
47. Switzerland (4)
48. Slovakia (2)
49. Sweden (7)
50. Tajikistan (1)
51. Tunisia (6)
52. Turkey (30)
53. Ukraine (30)
54. United States (30)
55. Venezuela (6)
56. United World Wrestling (30)
