= UFC 250 =

UFC mixed martial arts event in 2020

UFC 250: Nunes vs. Spencer
- The poster for UFC 250: Nunes vs. Spencer
- Promotion: Ultimate Fighting Championship
- Date: June 6, 2020
- Venue: UFC Apex
- City: Enterprise, Nevada, United States
- Attendance: None (behind closed doors)

Event chronology
UFC on ESPN: Woodley vs. Burns	UFC 250: Nunes vs. Spencer	UFC on ESPN: Eye vs. Calvillo

UFC 250: Nunes vs. Spencer was a mixed martial arts event produced by the Ultimate Fighting Championship that took place on June 6, 2020 at the UFC Apex facility in Enterprise, Nevada, part of the Las Vegas Metropolitan Area, United States. It was originally planned to take place on May 9 at Ginásio do Ibirapuera in São Paulo, Brazil. Due to the COVID-19 pandemic, the event was eventually postponed (see section below). On April 21, the UFC confirmed that UFC 249 would be moved to May 9 and UFC 250 was pushed back to June 6. In late May, the promotion confirmed the event would take place in Las Vegas.

== Background ==
A UFC Bantamweight Championship bout between the current champion Henry Cejudo (also former UFC Flyweight Champion and 2008 Olympic gold medalist in freestyle wrestling) and former WEC and two-time UFC Featherweight Champion José Aldo was expected to serve as the initial event headliner. However, Aldo pulled out on April 8 due to visa issues as the event was expected to be moved to the United States (see section below). Former two-time bantamweight champion Dominick Cruz replaced Aldo.

A UFC Women's Featherweight Championship bout between the current champion Amanda Nunes (also the current UFC Women's Bantamweight Champion) and former Invicta FC Featherweight Champion Felicia Spencer was expected to serve as the co-headliner. Nunes announced on April 20 that she would not compete at a new proposed event for May 9 due to her desire to have a full training camp.

=== COVID-19 pandemic ===
The event was originally expected to take place at Ginásio do Ibirapuera in São Paulo, Brazil. On April 7, it was announced that the venue will be used as a field hospital during the COVID-19 pandemic and would not be able to host the fight card.

Due to the event being expected to be relocated to the United States, several changes were made due to fighters being unable to compete due to travel restrictions related to the COVID-19 pandemic:

- A light heavyweight bout between the former UFC Light Heavyweight Champion Maurício Rua (also 2005 PRIDE Middleweight Grand Prix Champion) and Antônio Rogério Nogueira was cancelled. The pairing previously met at PRIDE Critical Countdown 2005 and UFC 190, with Rua winning both fights. The bout was later rescheduled for July 25, at UFC on ESPN: Whittaker vs. Till.
- Ketlen Vieira, who was expected to face Marion Reneau in a women's bantamweight bout.
- Former title challenger Bethe Correia, who was expected to face Pannie Kianzad in a women's bantamweight bout. This fight was also rescheduled for UFC on ESPN: Whittaker vs. Till.
- Augusto Sakai, who was expected to face former WSOF Heavyweight Champion Blagoy Ivanov in a heavyweight bout. This fight was later rescheduled for May 30, at UFC on ESPN: Woodley vs. Burns.
- Carlos Felipe, who was expected to face Sergey Spivak in a heavyweight bout. The bout was later rescheduled for July 18, at UFC Fight Night: Figueiredo vs. Benavidez 2.

UFC president Dana White announced on April 9 that starting with UFC 249, all future events were indefinitely postponed. It was confirmed that this event was cancelled on April 20, though the UFC was still targeting a new event for the same date (not expected to be the original UFC 250). The UFC moved the previously mentioned UFC Bantamweight Championship bout between Cejudo and Cruz, as well as a heavyweight bout between former UFC Heavyweight Champion Fabrício Werdum and Aleksei Oleinik to the new UFC 249 date.

On May 10, it was confirmed that UFC 250 was going to take place on June 6 in the United States, with the previously mentioned UFC Women's Featherweight Championship bout between Nunes and Spencer expected to headline the event. This event also featured fighters that were pulled from other events previously cancelled.

A bantamweight bout between former UFC Bantamweight Champion Cody Garbrandt and Raphael Assunção was scheduled for Columbus, Ohio on March 28, at UFC on ESPN: Ngannou vs. Rozenstruik. However, Garbrandt pulled out on March 12 due to kidney issues. The pairing was rescheduled for this event.

On June 4, Ian Heinisch was removed from his scheduled bout with Gerald Meerschaert after a cornerman tested positive for COVID-19. He was then expected to be replaced by promotional newcomer Anthony Ivy. However, Heinisch's cornerman was retested and cleared, allowing the original pairing to stay intact.

== Results ==
Main card
Weight class				Method	Round	Time	Notes
Women's Featherweight	Amanda Nunes (c)	def.	Felicia Spencer	Decision (unanimous) (50–44, 50–44, 50–45)	5	5:00	(Note: For the UFC Women's Featherweight Championship.)
Bantamweight	Cody Garbrandt	def.	Raphael Assunção	KO (punch)	2	4:59
Bantamweight	Aljamain Sterling	def.	Cory Sandhagen	Submission (rear-naked choke)	1	1:28	(Note: UFC Bantamweight title eliminator.)
Welterweight	Neil Magny	def.	Anthony Rocco Martin	Decision (unanimous) (30–27, 30–27, 29–28)	3	5:00
Bantamweight	Sean O'Malley	def.	Eddie Wineland	KO (punch)	1	1:54
Preliminary Card (ESPN / ESPN+)
Featherweight	Alex Caceres	def.	Chase Hooper	Decision (unanimous) (30–27, 30–27, 30–27)	3	5:00
Middleweight	Ian Heinisch	def.	Gerald Meerschaert	TKO (punches)	1	1:14
Featherweight	Cody Stamann	def.	Brian Kelleher	Decision (unanimous) (30–27, 30–27, 30–27)	3	5:00
Middleweight	Maki Pitolo	def.	Charles Byrd	TKO (punches)	2	1:10
Early Preliminary Card (ESPN / ESPN+ / UFC Fight Pass)
Flyweight	Alex Perez	def.	Jussier Formiga	TKO (leg kicks)	1	4:06
Light Heavyweight	Devin Clark	def.	Alonzo Menifield	Decision (unanimous) (30–27, 29–28, 29–28)	3	5:00
Catchweight (150 lb)	Herbert Burns	def.	Evan Dunham	Submission (rear-naked choke)	1	1:20

== Bonus awards ==
The following fighters received $50,000 bonuses.

- Fight of the Night: No bonus awarded.
- Performance of the Night: Cody Garbrandt, Aljamain Sterling, Sean O'Malley and Alex Perez

== Reported payout ==
The following is the reported payout to the fighters as reported to the Nevada State Athletic Commission (NSAC). It does not include sponsor money and also does not include the UFC's traditional "fight night" bonuses. The total disclosed payout for the event was $2,293,000.

- Amanda Nunes: $500,000 (includes $150,000 win bonus) def. Felicia Spencer: $125,000
- Cody Garbrandt: $260,000 (includes $130,000 win bonus) def. Raphael Assunção: $79,000
- Aljamain Sterling: $152,000 (includes $76,000 win bonus) def. Cory Sandhagen: $80,000
- Neil Magny: $158,000 (includes $79,000 win bonus) def. Anthony Rocco Martin: $48,000
- Sean O'Malley: $80,000 (includes $40,000 win bonus) def. Eddie Wineland: $46,000
- Alex Caceres: $116,000 (includes $58,000 win bonus) def. Chase Hooper: $27,000
- Ian Heinisch: $80,000 (includes $40,000 win bonus) def. Gerald Meerschaert: $33,000
- Cody Stamann: $72,000 (includes $36,000 win bonus) def. Brian Kelleher: $33,000
- Maki Pitolo: $20,000 (includes $10,000 win bonus) def. Charles Byrd: $12,000
- Alex Perez: $80,000 (includes $40,000 win bonus) def. Jussier Formiga: $98,000
- Devin Clark: $96,000 (includes $48,000 win bonus) def. Alonzo Menifield: $14,000
- Herbert Burns: $24,000 (includes $12,000 win bonus) def. Evan Dunham: $60,000

== See also ==
- List of UFC events
- List of current UFC fighters
- 2020 in UFC
