= Gvardeysky =

Gvardeysky (masculine), Gvardeyskaya (feminine), or Gvardeyskoye (neuter) may refer to:

- Gvardeysky District, a district in Kaliningrad Oblast, Russia
- Gvardeysky Urban Okrug, a municipal formation which Gvardeysky District in Kaliningrad Oblast, Russia is incorporated as
- Gvardeyskoye Urban Settlement, a former municipal formation which the town of district significance of Gvardeysk in Gvardeysky District of Kaliningrad Oblast, Russia was incorporated as
- Gvardeysky, Russia (Gvardeyskaya, Gvardeyskoye), several rural localities in Russia
- Gvardeyskiy, Kazakhstan, a village in Almaty Province, Kazakhstan

== See also ==
- Gvardeysk, Kaliningrad Oblast, Russia
- Hvardiiske (disambiguation)
- Krasnogvardeysky (disambiguation)
