= Gvardeysky, Russia =

Gvardeysky (Russian: Гварде́йский; masculine), Gvardeyskaya (Гварде́йская; feminine), or Gvardeyskoye (Гварде́йское; neuter) is the name of several rural localities in Russia:

- Gvardeysky, Rostov Oblast, a settlement in Alexeyevskoye Rural Settlement of Matveyevo-Kurgansky District in Rostov Oblast
- Gvardeysky, Dubensky District, Tula Oblast, a settlement in Gvardeysky Rural Okrug of Dubensky District in Tula Oblast
- Gvardeysky, Kireyevsky District, Tula Oblast, a settlement in Podosinovsky Rural Okrug of Kireyevsky District in Tula Oblast
- Gvardeysky, Volgograd Oblast, a khutor in Zakharovsky Selsoviet of Kletsky District in Volgograd Oblast
- Gvardeyskoye, Chechen Republic, a selo in Gvardeyskaya Rural Administration of Nadterechny District in the Chechen Republic
- Gvardeyskoye, Kabardino-Balkar Republic (or Gvardeysky), a selo in Prokhladnensky District of the Kabardino-Balkar Republic; 43°56′N 44°7′E
- Gvardeyskoye, Kaliningrad Oblast, a settlement in Gvardeysky Rural Okrug of Bagrationovsky District in Kaliningrad Oblast
- Gvardeyskoye, Krasnodar Krai, a selo in Kiyevsky Rural Okrug of Krymsky District in Krasnodar Krai; 45°8′N 37°53′E
- Gvardeyskoye, Leningrad Oblast, a settlement in Goncharovskoye Settlement Municipal Formation of Vyborgsky District in Leningrad Oblast; 60°48′N 28°58′E
- Gvardeyskoye, Saratov Oblast, a selo in Krasnoarmeysky District of Saratov Oblast
