= UFC on ESPN: Whittaker vs. Till =

UFC mixed martial arts event in 2020

- The poster for UFC on ESPN: Whittaker vs. Till
- Promotion: Ultimate Fighting Championship
- Date: July 26, 2020
- Venue: du Forum
- City: Abu Dhabi, United Arab Emirates
- Attendance: None (behind closed doors)

Event chronology
UFC Fight Night: Figueiredo vs. Benavidez 2	UFC on ESPN: Whittaker vs. Till	UFC Fight Night: Brunson vs. Shahbazyan

UFC on ESPN: Whittaker vs. Till (also known as UFC on ESPN 14 and UFC Fight Island 3) was a mixed martial arts event produced by the Ultimate Fighting Championship that took place on July 26, 2020 at the du Forum on Yas Island, Abu Dhabi, United Arab Emirates.

== Background ==
This event was the fourth and final UFC Fight Island event that took place on Yas Island, following UFC 251, UFC on ESPN: Kattar vs. Ige and UFC Fight Night: Figueiredo vs. Benavidez 2, as part of a plan to facilitate the hosting of events involving fighters impacted by U.S. travel restrictions related to the COVID-19 pandemic.

A middleweight bout between former UFC Middleweight Champion Robert Whittaker (also The Ultimate Fighter: The Smashes welterweight winner) and former UFC Welterweight Championship challenger Darren Till served as the event headliner. They were previously linked to an event in Dublin, Ireland that was to take place in August 2020.

The event also included fighters that were pulled from other events previously cancelled, as well as the following bouts:

- A light heavyweight bout between the former UFC Light Heavyweight Champion Maurício Rua (also 2005 PRIDE Middleweight Grand Prix Champion) and Antônio Rogério Nogueira. The pairing previously met at PRIDE Critical Countdown 2005 and UFC 190, with Rua winning both fights. The bout was scheduled for the original May 9 date of UFC 250 that later became UFC 249, but cancelled due to the relocation of the event. Nogueira announced that he planned to retire after this bout.
- A women's bantamweight bout between former title challenger Bethe Correia and Pannie Kianzad. This bout was also scheduled for the original May 9 date of UFC 250 and removed for the same reasons as the fight above it.
- A welterweight bout between Danny Roberts and Nicolas Dalby. They were scheduled to meet at UFC Fight Night: Woodley vs. Edwards, but the event was the first of five to be cancelled due to the COVID-19 pandemic. However, Roberts was forced off the card due to injury and replaced by returning veteran Jesse Ronson.
- A heavyweight bout between Tom Aspinall and Jake Collier. This fight was also scheduled for UFC Fight Night: Woodley vs. Edwards and removed for the same reasons as the previous one.

A welterweight bout between Ramazan Emeev and Shavkat Rakhmonov was expected to take place at the event. However, Rakhmonov was forced to withdraw due to injury on July 2 and replaced by Niklas Stolze.

Umar Nurmagomedov was expected to face Nathaniel Wood in a bantamweight bout at this event. However, he pulled out on July 3 after his uncle, Abdulmanap Nurmagomedov (also the father of former UFC Lightweight Champion Khabib Nurmagomedov), died from complications related to COVID-19. He was replaced by promotional newcomer John Castañeda.

A women's strawweight bout between former Invicta FC and UFC Women's Strawweight Champion Carla Esparza and Marina Rodriguez was scheduled for UFC on ESPN: Kattar vs. Ige nine days earlier. However, a Rodriguez cornerman tested positive for COVID-19 and the bout was cancelled. Rodriguez had her test come back negative, but the bout was scrapped due to precautionary reasons. They were rescheduled for this event.

Justin Tafa was expected to face Raphael Pessoa in a heavyweight bout at this event. However, he pulled out on July 15 for unknown reasons and was replaced by Tanner Boser.

At the weigh-ins, Francisco Trinaldo weighed in at 160 pounds, four pounds over the lightweight non-title fight limit. His bout proceeded at a catchweight and he was fined 30% of his purse, which went to his opponent Jai Herbert.

== Results ==
Main card (ESPN / ESPN+)
Weight class				Method	Round	Time	Notes
Middleweight	Robert Whittaker	def.	Darren Till	Decision (unanimous) (48–47, 48–47, 48–47)	5	5:00
Light Heavyweight	Maurício Rua	def.	Antônio Rogério Nogueira	Decision (split) (29–28, 28–29, 29–28)	3	5:00
Heavyweight	Fabrício Werdum	def.	Alexander Gustafsson	Submission (armbar)	1	2:30
Women's Strawweight	Carla Esparza	def.	Marina Rodriguez	Decision (split) (28–29, 29–28, 30–27)	3	5:00
Light Heavyweight	Paul Craig	def.	Gadzhimurad Antigulov	Submission (triangle choke)	1	2:06
Welterweight	Alex Oliveira	def.	Peter Sobotta	Decision (unanimous) (30–27, 30–27, 30–27)	3	5:00
Welterweight	Khamzat Chimaev	def.	Rhys McKee	TKO (punches)	1	3:09
Preliminary Card (ESPN / ESPN+)
Catchweight (160 lb)	Francisco Trinaldo	def.	Jai Herbert	TKO (punch)	3	1:30
Welterweight	Jesse Ronson	vs.	Nicolas Dalby	No Contest (overturned)	1	2:48	(Note: Originally a submission (rear-naked choke) win for Ronson; overturned after he tested positive for metandienone.)
Heavyweight	Tom Aspinall	def.	Jake Collier	TKO (knee and punches)	1	0:45
Featherweight	Movsar Evloev	def.	Mike Grundy	Decision (unanimous) (30–27, 30–27, 29–28)	3	5:00
Heavyweight	Tanner Boser	def.	Raphael Pessoa	TKO (punches)	2	2:36
Women's Bantamweight	Pannie Kianzad	def.	Bethe Correia	Decision (unanimous) (30–27, 30–27, 29–28)	3	5:00
Welterweight	Ramazan Emeev	def.	Niklas Stolze	Decision (unanimous) (30–27, 30–27, 29–28)	3	5:00
Bantamweight	Nathaniel Wood	def.	John Castañeda	Decision (unanimous) (30–27, 30–27, 30–27)	3	5:00

== Bonus awards ==
The following fighters received $50,000 bonuses.

- Fight of the Night: No bonus awarded.
- Performance of the Night: Fabrício Werdum, Paul Craig, Khamzat Chimaev, Jesse Ronson, Tom Aspinall and Tanner Boser

== Records set ==
The event's 15 bouts tied UFC 2 for the most on a single card in UFC history. UFC 259, UFC 283, UFC 286 and UFC Fight Night: Aspinall vs. Tybura later had fifteen bouts as well.

Khamzat Chimaev broke the record for quickest turnaround between UFC wins at 10 days (not including one-night-tournaments during the UFC's early days).

== Aftermath ==
On November 18, it was announced by the United States Anti-Doping Agency (USADA) that Jesse Ronson was suspended for 20 months after he tested positive for metandienone in an out-of-competition test conducted on July 22 and didn't disclose his use of the substance in his onboarding documents prior to re-joining the UFC. His suspension is retroactive to the test failure, meaning he'll be cleared to compete on March 22, 2022. They also announced that Ronson's victory was overturned to a no contest due to the violation.

== See also ==
- List of UFC events
- List of current UFC fighters
- 2020 in UFC
