= Khamzat Chimaev =

Russian-Emirati mixed martial artist and freestyle wrestler (born 1994)

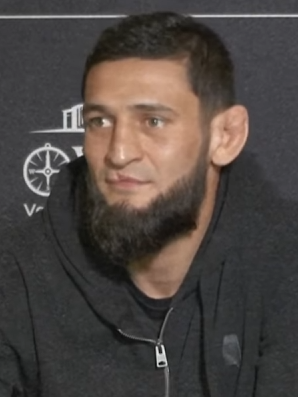
- Chimaev in 2022
- Born: Khamzat Khizarovich Girikanov; 1 May 1994 (age 32); Gvardeyskoye, Chechen Republic, Russia (Note: Chechnya was a de facto independent state known as the Chechen Republic of Ichkeria at the time of Chimaev's birth.)
- Native name: Chechen: Чимаев Хизаран кӏант Хамзат
- Other names: Borz
- Nationality: Russian; Emirati
- Height: 6 ft 2 in (1.88 m)
- Weight: 185 lb (84 kg; 13 st 3 lb)
- Division: Welterweight (2018–2022); Middleweight (2018–2020, 2023–present)
- Reach: 75 in (190 cm)
- Fighting out of: Dubai, United Arab Emirates
- Team: Allstars Training Center (2017–2023); Fight Club Akhmat
- Rank: Black belt in Brazilian jiu-jitsu under Alan Nascimento
- Years active: 2015–present (Freestyle wrestling); 2018–present (MMA)

Mixed martial arts record
- Total: 16
- Wins: 15
- By knockout: 6
- By submission: 6
- By decision: 3
- Losses: 1
- By decision: 1

Amateur record
- Total: 3
- Wins: 3
- By knockout: 1
- By submission: 2

Other information
- Website: khamzatborz.com
- Mixed martial arts record from Sherdog

Khamzat Khizarovich Chimaev (Note: Chechen: Чимаев Хизаран кӏант Хамзат; Russian: Хамзат Хизарович Чимаев;) (born 1 May 1994) is a Russian-Emirati professional mixed martial artist and freestyle wrestler. He currently competes in the Middleweight division of the Ultimate Fighting Championship (UFC), where he is the former UFC Middleweight Champion. As of 12 May 2026, he is #1 in the Meta UFC middleweight rankings, and as of 17 November 2026, he is #12 in the UFC men's pound-for-pound rankings.

In freestyle wrestling, Chimaev is a three-time Swedish national champion. He is currently signed to Real American Freestyle (RAF), where he is the inaugural RAF Light Heavyweight Crossover Champion.

== Early life and career ==
Chimaev was born on 1 May 1994 in Gvardeyskoye, Chechen Republic, Russia to a poor and conservative Muslim Chechen family. He started wrestling at the age of five in the village of Gvardeyskoye. It has been reported he won a bronze medal at the Russian National Championships in the junior level. In 2013, when he was 18, he emigrated to Sweden with his mother, joining his older brother.

== Combat sports career ==
=== Wrestling ===
After moving to Sweden, Chimaev wrestled at multiple clubs, including BK Athén. Considered one of the best freestyle wrestlers in the country, Chimaev won a gold medal at the 2016 and 2017 Swedish Freestyle National Championships at 86 kilograms, and in 2018 he did so at 92 kilograms. Chimaev has had a series of dominant performances in the tournaments, posting an overall record of 12–0, which includes three pins, seven technical falls and outscored his opponents by a combined score of 105-2 across the three tournaments.

In addition to wrestling, Chimaev has competed in several judo tournaments and in four combat sambo fights.

Chimaev competed against fellow UFC contender Jack Hermansson in a freestyle wrestling match on 19 November 2021, at Sweden-based Bulldog Fight Night 9, winning on points.

On 18 April 2026 during the RAF 08 broadcast, it was announced that Chimaev had signed with Real American Freestyle.

He headlined RAF 10 on 13 June 2026 against Dillon Danis in a 205 lb Catchweight bout. Chimaev won the match by pinfall in 44 seconds, marking the fastest pin in RAF history.

Chimaev faced Tyron Woodley in the main event on 5 September 2026 at RAF Moscow. He won by pinfall in the first round.

Chimaev faced Gilbert Burns on 18 September 2026 at RAF 13. He won the match by technical fall.

Chimaev faced Robbie Lawler in the co-main event on 23 October 2026 at RAF 14. He won by technical fall in the first round.

Chimaev was scheduled to challenge Colby Covington for the RAF Cruiserweight Crossover Championship on November 14, 2026 at RAF Abu Dhabi. However, during fight week, Covington withdrew due to an injury and was replaced by former UFC Middleweight Champion Chris Weidman. The bout was then contested for the inaugural RAF Light Heavyweight Crossover Championship. Chimaev won the championship by technical fall.

Chimaev is scheduled to defend his title against Rashad Evans on 19 December 2026 at RAF 16.

=== Mixed martial arts career ===
Chimaev first started training in MMA when he was 23 years old. He trained at Allstars Training Center in Stockholm, along with three-time UFC Light Heavyweight Championship challenger Alexander Gustafsson, Ilir Latifi and Reza Madadi among others. Gustafsson (one of his main training partners) told a Swedish reporter that Chimaev was one of the best fighters he had ever trained with, during a press conference in June 2019.

==== Early career ====
In an interview with ESPN, Chimaev claimed he was inspired to start training in MMA during a night at work where he took a 15-minute break to watch the Aldo vs. McGregor main event. Chimaev stated, "I was watching his [McGregor's] fight. I was watching him fight Aldo. I was sitting in night and was working. I was taking rest for 15 minutes and watched his fight. I always look at that like if the guys make so many money like millions and this stuff, why I can't do it now. I'm a fighter, I'm a warrior and I have something special inside me. I had to find some way and take out this to show to the people."

Between September 2017 and April 2018, Chimaev had three amateur MMA fights. The first of them was against future IMMAF World Champion Khaled Laallam, whom he defeated via submission in the second round. He won his following two amateur fights, one by submission and one by technical knockout, completing his amateur career with a record of 3–0.

Chimaev turned professional on 26 May 2018, at International Ring Fight Arena 14, against Gard Olve Sagen. He won the fight via technical knockout in the second round. Chimaev's next fight took place on 18 August 2018, against Ole Magnor at Fight Club Rush 3. He won via submission with a rear naked choke late in the first round.

==== Brave Combat Federation ====
After having his first two professional fights in Sweden, Chimaev signed with Middle Eastern organization Brave Combat Federation. He was scheduled to make his promotional debut against Benjamin Bennett on 16 November 2018, at Brave CF 18. However, Bennett withdrew from the bout and was replaced by undefeated prospect Marko Kisič. Chimaev won the fight via technical knockout in the first round after dropping his opponent with a left hand.

Chimaev had a quick turnaround for his next fight when he took on Sidney Wheeler on short notice on 22 December 2018, at Brave CF 20, replacing an injured Leon Aliu. He won the fight via technical knockout in 35 seconds into the first round.

He then fought Ikram Aliskerov on 19 April 2019, at Brave CF 23. This was Chimaev's debut in the welterweight division. He won the bout via knockout after landing an uppercut in the first round. This performance earned him Brave's Knockout of the Night award.

His fourth promotional fight came against Mzwandile Hlongwa on 4 October 2019, at Brave CF 27. Chimaev won the fight via submission in the second round.

Chimaev was expected to challenge Jarrah Al-Selawe for the BCF Welterweight Championship on 18 April 2020, at Brave CF 37, which would be the promotions first event in Chimaev's hometown of Stockholm, Sweden. However, the event would be postponed due to the COVID-19 pandemic and the matchup was cancelled altogether when Chimaev signed with the UFC instead.

==== Ultimate Fighting Championship ====
Chimaev made his promotional debut in a middleweight bout against John Phillips, replacing Duško Todorović, on 16 July 2020, at UFC on ESPN 13. He won the fight via submission in the second round. This win earned him the Performance of the Night award.

Ten days after the fight against Phillips, Chimaev faced promotional newcomer Rhys McKee at welterweight on 25 July 2020, at UFC on ESPN 14. He won the fight via technical knockout in the first round. He earned his second Performance of the Night bonus award. This win also marked a new UFC record for the fastest consecutive wins in modern UFC history (ten days), although the official UFC record is still held by Royce Gracie, who achieved four consecutive wins within one night at UFC 2.

It was reported on 6 September 2020, that Chimaev would have another quick turnaround as he was booked to face Gerald Meerschaert on 19 September 2020, at UFC Fight Night 178. He won the fight against Meerschaert via knockout just 17 seconds into round one. This win earned him his third straight Performance of the Night award. This also earned him a new record, as it was the fastest three fight winning streak in modern UFC history (66 days).

Chimaev was scheduled to face Leon Edwards in the main event of UFC Fight Night 183 on 19 December 2020. In between, Chimaev was added to the UFC welterweight rankings, entering at #15. On 29 November, it was announced that Chimaev had tested positive for COVID-19, and the bout was declared to be in jeopardy. On 1 December, Edwards also tested positive for COVID-19 and the bout was subsequently postponed. On 22 December, it was announced that the bout was rescheduled for 20 January 2021, at UFC Fight Night 185. Subsequently, Chimaev pulled out of the contest on 29 December due to his own COVID-19 recovery. As a result, the bout was momentarily cancelled. The pair was rescheduled once again to headline UFC Fight Night 187, on 13 March. However, on 11 February, UFC president Dana White announced the fight was once again cancelled due to Chimaev suffering from lingering effects of COVID-19.

On 1 March 2021, he announced on Instagram that he was retiring from the sport due to lung complications caused by COVID-19. Dana White later came out and said Chimaev was not retired and was just emotional after experiencing effects of prednisone for his lungs during a training session.

Chimaev returned to face Li Jingliang on 30 October 2021, at UFC 267. He won the bout via technical submission, choking Li unconscious with a rear-naked choke in round one. This win earned him his fourth straight Performance of the Night award.

Chimaev faced Gilbert Burns at UFC 273 on 9 April 2022. Chimaev won the fight via unanimous decision, the first decision victory of his career. The fight was awarded the Fight of the Night award. The fight also earned him first place in the Crypto.com Fan Bonus of the Night award.

Chimaev was scheduled to face Nate Diaz on 10 September 2022 in the main event of UFC 279. At the weigh-ins, Chimaev weighed in at 178.5 pounds, seven and a half pounds over the welterweight non-title fight limit. As a result of missing weight, Chimaev was removed from his main event bout with Diaz, and instead faced Kevin Holland in the co-main event at a 180-pound catchweight bout. Holland was already set for a 180-pound catchweight bout against Daniel Rodriguez on the card. Chimaev won the bout via D'Arce Choke in the first round.

After a one-year layoff, Chimaev returned to middleweight on 21 October 2023, at UFC 294. Chimaev was originally scheduled to fight former middleweight title challenger Paulo Costa. However, due to surgery forcing Costa to pull out of the fight, Chimaev faced former UFC Welterweight Champion Kamaru Usman. He won the fight via majority decision.

Chimaev was scheduled to face former UFC Middleweight Champion Robert Whittaker on 22 June 2024, at UFC on ABC 6. However, he was forced to pull out of the contest due to an illness and was replaced by Ikram Aliskerov.

Chimaev ended up facing Robert Whittaker on 26 October 2024 at UFC 308. He won the fight via a face-crank submission in the first round resulting in a dislocated jaw. This fight earned him another Performance of the Night award.

==== UFC Middleweight Champion ====
Chimaev faced Dricus du Plessis for the UFC Middleweight Championship on 16 August 2025 at UFC 319. He won the title via unanimous decision. This win earned Chimaev his sixth Performance of the Night award.

Chimaev made his first title defense against former champion Sean Strickland at UFC 328 on 9 May 2026. He lost the title via split decision, his first loss in a mixed martial arts bout. 13 out of 24 media outlets scored the bout for Chimaev.

== Training ==
Chimaev has trained at Allstar Training Center in Stockholm, Sweden since he was 23 years of age. He moved there to start his MMA career in 2017, after previously living in another Swedish town, Kalmar, where he trained at the local wrestling club. Chimaev continues to train alongside current and former UFC fighters such as Alexander Gustafsson, Ilir Latifi and Reza Madadi, with the latter being his main trainer.

In 2022, Chimaev and UFC title challenger Darren Till got in contact to train with each other, with Till arriving in Stockholm in February, and have since been training at Allstars Training Center and shooting content for YouTube and Blockasset.

In an interview, Chimaev revealed he trains up to five times a day on the peak of training camps, and two to three times when he has no fights coming up.

== Fighting style ==
Chimaev often utilizes his freestyle wrestling in his fights to get his opponents to the ground. Once he is on top control, he employs different techniques to gain control over his opponents and land heavy ground-and-pound or seek submissions, while forcing his weight towards them. His grappling is very often compared to Khabib Nurmagomedov's, due to the similarities of the techniques, such as the handcuff lock and hooking the legs. Regarding strikes, Chimaev landed 192–2 in his first two UFC bouts utilizing this strategy. Chimaev also proved its effectiveness on the regional circuit as well, with a quick win over former two-time GHSA wrestling champion Sidney Wheeler after taking him down with an outside trip.

In addition to his grappling abilities, Chimaev will also strike in his contests. His striking involves heavy knockout power from the orthodox stance while utilizing basic boxing and mixing up kicks. He also uses his wrestling to set up his strikes by feinting different takedowns and vice versa. By using his striking, Chimaev has been able to knock out UFC veteran Gerald Meerschaert in 17 seconds with a single punch. He has previously used it to drop past opponents on the regional circuit, including former combat sambo World Champion Ikram Aliskerov. Chimaev's striking defense mainly depends on his grappling. Before his fight with Gilbert Burns, he had more victories (4) than total strikes received (2), with a lone significant strike. As of 2025, the Burns fight accounts for nearly 70% of the significant strikes Chimaev has absorbed in his nine UFC fights.

== Personal life ==
Chimaev carries a notable scar on his lip, which he got at the age of two when he fell down on concrete stairs, leaving him unable to breathe correctly through one nostril.

Before he began competing professionally, he worked at a poultry factory in Kalmar and also did security work.

Chimaev has an older brother named Artur, who competes in freestyle wrestling.

Chimaev contracted COVID-19 in December 2020 and suffered lingering symptoms that required multiple hospitalizations and the cancelation of a scheduled fight against Leon Edwards.

Chimaev is close with fellow mixed martial artists Darren Till and Jack Hermansson.

Despite living in Sweden for many years, Chimaev never acquired Swedish citizenship, keeping his Russian citizenship. In 2023, Chimaev moved to the UAE, and later received citizenship in January 2025. He is the first athlete representing the United Arab Emirates to win a UFC title.

=== Association with Ramzan Kadyrov ===
Chimaev is close to Chechen leader Ramzan Kadyrov. Kadyrov gifted Chimaev a Mercedes-Benz, which he crashed months later. Kadyrov also allegedly convinced Chimaev to not retire in March 2021 and go back to Chechnya, which led to speculation on the media on whether Chimaev had been forced to do so. Chimaev has sparred with Kadyrov, and appeared in multiple photoshoots with Kadyrov. In 2022, Chimaev began training Kadyrov's two teenage sons, Zelimkhan (Ali) and Adam. He was in Ali's corner at his professional MMA debut at ACA 150 in December, accompanied him to UFC 280 in Abu Dhabi, and took him to train at Tiger Muay Thai in Thailand.

Chimaev was present during a livestream in which Kadyrov threatened to kill a minor who criticized his repressive rule. In March 2022, Chechen dissidents criticized Chimaev's continued association with Kadyrov due to his repressive rule of the Chechen Republic.

Chimaev got married on 21 May 2022, in Chechnya and the wedding was attended by Kadyrov.

== Championships and accomplishments ==
=== Mixed martial arts ===
- Ultimate Fighting Championship
  - UFC Middleweight Championship (One time)
    - Tied (Demetrious Johnson) for fourth most takedowns landed in a UFC title fight (12 vs. Dricus du Plessis)
    - First Chechen-born fighter to win a UFC championship
  - Fight of the Night (One time) vs. Gilbert Burns
  - Performance of the Night (Six times) vs. John Phillips, Rhys McKee, Gerald Meerschaert, Li Jingliang, Robert Whittaker and Dricus du Plessis
  - Record for fastest consecutive wins in Modern UFC history (10 days)
  - Record for quickest three fight win streak in Modern UFC history (66 days)
  - Second most control time in a UFC fight (21:40 vs. Dricus du Plessis)
  - Third highest control time percentage in UFC Middleweight division history (60.6%)
  - Second highest top-position percentage in UFC Middleweight division history (57.6%)
  - Second highest takedown accuracy percentage in UFC Middleweight division history (60.4%)
  - Second most takedowns landed in a UFC middleweight fight (12 vs. Dricus du Plessis)
  - Holds wins over three former UFC champions — vs. Kamaru Usman, Robert Whittaker & Dricus du Plessis
  - UFC Striking Records
    - Most total strikes landed in a UFC fight (529 vs. Dricus du Plessis) (Note: Most in a UFC title fight.)
    - Most total ground strikes landed in a UFC fight (517 vs. Dricus du Plessis)
    - Most total head strikes landed in a UFC fight (411 vs. Dricus du Plessis)
    - Second most total strikes attempted in a UFC fight (567 vs. Dricus du Plessis)
  - UFC Honors Awards
    - 2020: Fan's Choice Debut of the Year Winner vs. John Phillips
    - 2021: Fan's Choice Submission of the Year Nominee vs. Li Jingliang
    - 2022: President's Choice Fight of the Year Winner vs. Gilbert Burns
    - 2024: President's Choice Performance of the Year Nominee vs. Robert Whittaker
  - UFC.com Awards
    - 2020: Newcomer of the Year, Ranked #5 Fighter of the Year & Ranked #5 Knockout of the Year vs. Gerald Meerschaert
    - 2021: Ranked #9 Submission of the Year vs. Li Jingliang
    - 2022: Ranked #2 Fight of the Year vs. Gilbert Burns
    - 2024: Submission of the Year vs. Robert Whittaker
- Crypto.com
  - Fan Bonus of the Night vs. Gilbert Burns
- Brave Combat Federation
  - Knockout of the Night (One time) vs. Ikram Aliskerov
- Nordic MMA Awards – MMAviking.com
  - 2018 Prospect of the Year
  - 2020 Male fighter of the Year
- ESPN
  - 2020 Breakout Fighter of the Year
- MMA Junkie
  - 2020 September Knockout of the Month vs. Gerald Meerschaert
  - 2020 Newcomer of the Year
  - 2024 Submission of the Year vs. Robert Whittaker at UFC 308
  - 2024 October Submission of the Month vs. Robert Whittaker at UFC 308
- MMA Fighting
  - 2020 Breakout Fighter of the Year
- Combat Press
  - 2020 Breakthrough Fighter of the Year
  - 2024 Submission of the Year vs. Robert Whittaker at UFC 308
- BT Sport
  - 2020 Breakthrough Fighter of the Year
- BodySlam.net
  - 2024 Submission of the Year vs. Robert Whittaker
- Yahoo! Sports
  - 2020 Prospect of the Year
  - 2024 Submission of the Year vs. Robert Whittaker at UFC 308
- MMA Mania
  - 2024 Submission of the Year vs. Robert Whittaker at UFC 308
- Bloody Elbow
  - 2020 Newcomer of the Year
- Bleacher Report
  - 2020 Rising Star of the Year
  - 2021 Rising Star of the Year
  - 2024 Submission of the Year vs. Robert Whittaker
- LowKick MMA
  - 2020 Prospect of the Year
- Ministry of Physical Culture and Sport of the Chechen Republic
  - 2025 Athlete of the Year

=== Freestyle wrestling ===
- Swedish Wrestling Federation
  - 2018 Swedish Championships champion, 92 kg
  - 2016 Swedish Championships champion, 86 kg
  - 2016 Solacup Championships champion, 86 kg
  - 2015 Hammarslaget Championships champion, 86 kg
  - 2015 Swedish Championships champion, 86 kg
  - 2015 Lilla Mälarcupen Championships champion, 86 kg
- Real American Freestyle
  - RAF Light Heavyweight Crossover Champion (One time, inaugural, current)
  - Fastest pin in RAF history (0:44) (vs. Dillon Danis)

== Mixed martial arts record ==
Professional record breakdown
16 matches	15 wins	1 loss
By knockout	6	0
By submission	6	0
By decision	3	1

Res.	Record	Opponent	Method	Event	Date	Round	Time	Location	Notes
Loss	15–1	Sean Strickland	Decision (split)	UFC 328	9 May 2026	5	5:00	Newark, New Jersey, United States	Lost the UFC Middleweight Championship.
Win	15–0	Dricus du Plessis	Decision (unanimous)	UFC 319	16 August 2025	5	5:00	Chicago, Illinois, United States	Won the UFC Middleweight Championship. Performance of the Night.
Win	14–0	Robert Whittaker	Submission (face crank)	UFC 308	26 October 2024	1	3:34	Abu Dhabi, United Arab Emirates	Performance of the Night.
Win	13–0	Kamaru Usman	Decision (majority)	UFC 294	21 October 2023	3	5:00	Abu Dhabi, United Arab Emirates	Return to Middleweight.
Win	12–0	Kevin Holland	Submission (brabo choke)	UFC 279	10 September 2022	1	2:13	Las Vegas, Nevada, United States	Catchweight (180 lb) bout.
Win	11–0	Gilbert Burns	Decision (unanimous)	UFC 273	9 April 2022	3	5:00	Jacksonville, Florida, United States	Fight of the Night.
Win	10–0	Li Jingliang	Technical Submission (rear-naked choke)	UFC 267	30 October 2021	1	3:16	Abu Dhabi, United Arab Emirates	Performance of the Night.
Win	9–0	Gerald Meerschaert	KO (punch)	UFC Fight Night: Covington vs. Woodley	19 September 2020	1	0:17	Las Vegas, Nevada, United States	Middleweight bout. Performance of the Night.
Win	8–0	Rhys McKee	TKO (punches)	UFC on ESPN: Whittaker vs. Till	26 July 2020	1	3:09	Abu Dhabi, United Arab Emirates	Broke the record for quickest turnaround between UFC wins in the modern era (10 days). Performance of the Night.
Win	7–0	John Phillips	Submission (brabo choke)	UFC on ESPN: Kattar vs. Ige	16 July 2020	2	1:12	Abu Dhabi, United Arab Emirates	Middleweight bout. Performance of the Night.
Win	6–0	Mzwandile Hlongwa	Technical Submission (brabo choke)	Brave CF 27	4 October 2019	2	1:15	Abu Dhabi, United Arab Emirates	
Win	5–0	Ikram Aliskerov	KO (punch)	Brave CF 23	19 April 2019	1	2:26	Amman, Jordan	Catchweight (180 lb) bout. Knockout of the Night.
Win	4–0	Sidney Wheeler	TKO (submission to punches)	Brave CF 20	22 December 2018	1	0:35	Hyderabad, India	Middleweight bout.
Win	3–0	Marko Kisič	TKO (punches)	Brave CF 18	16 November 2018	1	3:12	Manama, Bahrain	Welterweight debut.
Win	2–0	Ole Magnor	Submission (rear-naked choke)	Fight Club Rush 3	18 August 2018	1	4:23	Västerås, Sweden	Middleweight debut.
Win	1–0	Gard Olve Sagen	TKO (punches)	International Ring Fight Arena 14	26 May 2018	2	0:05	Uppsala, Sweden	Catchweight (176 lb) bout.

Amateur record breakdown		
3 matches	3 wins	0 losses
By knockout	1	0
By submission	2	0

Res.	Record	Opponent	Method	Event	Date	Round	Time	Location	Notes
Win	3–0	Adnan Music	TKO (punches)	Nordic Warrior 3	14 April 2018	1	0:57	Nyköping, Sweden	
Win	2–0	Danijel Grbic	Submission (guillotine choke)	Kashio Battle 14	18 November 2017	2	2:20	Helsingborg, Sweden	
Win	1–0	Khaled Laallam	Submission (brabo choke)	Fight Club Rush 1	10 September 2017	2	2:06	Västerås, Sweden	

== Pay-per-view bouts ==
No.	Event	Fight	Date	Venue	City	PPV buys
1.	UFC 319	du Plessis vs. Chimaev	16 August 2025	United Center	Chicago, Illinois, United States	Not Disclosed

== Freestyle wrestling record ==
Senior Freestyle Matches
Res.	Record	Opponent	Score	Date	Event	Location
Win	28–0	(United States) Chris Weidman	TF 10–0	14 November 2026	RAF Abu Dhabi: Chimaev vs. Weidman	Abu Dhabi, United Arab Emirates
Win	27–0	(United States) Robbie Lawler	TF 11-0	23 October 2026	RAF 14: Tsarukyan vs. Danis	(United States) Las Vegas, Nevada
Win	26–0	(United States) Tyron Woodley	Fall	6 September 2026	RAF Moscow	Moscow, Russia
Win	25–0	(United States) Dillon Danis	Fall	13 June 2026	RAF 10: Chimaev vs. Danis	(United States) St. Louis, Missouri
Win	24–0	(Norway) Jack Hermansson	8–0	19 November 2021	Bulldog Fight Night 9	Gothenburg, Sweden
2018 SM Nationals (gold) at 92 kg
Win	23–0	(Sweden) Albin Frid	7–0	3 June 2018	2018 Swedish National Wrestling Championships	Örnsköldsvik, Sweden
Win	22–0	(Sweden) Tobias Mathisen	TF 10–0	3 June 2018	2018 Swedish National Wrestling Championships	Örnsköldsvik, Sweden
Win	21–0	(Sweden) Oskar Hjelm	TF 10–0	3 June 2018	2018 Swedish National Wrestling Championships	Örnsköldsvik, Sweden
Win	20–0	(Sweden) Farid Teymori	TF 10–0	3 June 2018	2018 Swedish National Wrestling Championships	Örnsköldsvik, Sweden
2016 SM Nationals (gold) at 86 kg
Win	19–0	(Sweden) Alireza Rezai	TF 10–0	10 July 2016	2016 Swedish National Wrestling Championships	Norrköping, Sweden
Win	18–0	(Sweden) Anton Carlsson	TF 10–0	10 July 2016	2016 Swedish National Wrestling Championships	Norrköping, Sweden
Win	17–0	(Sweden) Fredrik Almén	Fall	10 July 2016	2016 Swedish National Wrestling Championships	Norrköping, Sweden
2016 Solacup (gold) at 86 kg
Win	16–0	(Sweden) Henrik Martengård	TF 12–2	7 May 2016	2016 Solacup	Karlstad, Sweden
Win	15–0	(Sweden) Christian Nielsen	Fall	7 May 2016	2016 Solacup	Karlstad, Sweden
2015 Hammarslaget (gold) at 86 kg
Win	14–0	(Sweden) Christian Nielsen	Fall	26 September 2015	2015 Hammarslaget	Hallstahammar, Sweden
Win	13–0	(Sweden) Sven Engström	TF 10–0	26 September 2015	2015 Hammarslaget	Hallstahammar, Sweden
Win	12–0	(Sweden) Martin Sandin	TF 10–0	26 September 2015	2015 Hammarslaget	Hallstahammar, Sweden
Win	11–0	(Sweden) Farid Teymori	TF 10–0	26 September 2015	2015 Hammarslaget	Hallstahammar, Sweden
2015 SM Nationals (gold) at 86 kg
Win	10–0	(Sweden) Naib Ilaladayev	TF 12–2	4 July 2015	2015 Swedish National Wrestling Championships	Sundsvall, Sweden
Win	9–0	(Sweden) Filip Krantz	4–0	4 July 2015	2015 Swedish National Wrestling Championships	Sundsvall, Sweden
Win	8–0	(Sweden) Sven Engström	Fall	4 July 2015	2015 Swedish National Wrestling Championships	Sundsvall, Sweden
Win	7–0	(Sweden) Mattias Balkevärn	Fall	4 July 2015	2015 Swedish National Wrestling Championships	Sundsvall, Sweden
Win	6–0	(Sweden) Simon Brandström	TF 10–0	4 July 2015	2015 Swedish National Wrestling Championships	Sundsvall, Sweden
2015 Lilla Mälarcupen (gold) at 86 kg
Win	5–0	(Sweden) Naib Ilaldayev	TF 14–4	3–4 February 2015	2015 Lilla Mälarcupen	Västerås, Sweden
Win	4–0	(Sweden) Samuel Thaken	Fall	3–4 February 2015	2015 Lilla Mälarcupen	Västerås, Sweden
Win	3–0	(Sweden) Billy Granberg	Fall	3–4 February 2015	2015 Lilla Mälarcupen	Västerås, Sweden
Win	2–0	(Sweden) Edgar Mrad	TF 12–0	3–4 February 2015	2015 Lilla Mälarcupen	Västerås, Sweden
Win	1–0	(Sweden) Emil Bertzell	TF 12–0	3–4 February 2015	2015 Lilla Mälarcupen	Västerås, Sweden

== See also ==
- List of current UFC fighters
- List of male mixed martial artists

== Notes ==
Awards and achievements
Preceded by Dricus du Plessis	16th UFC Middleweight Champion; 16 August 2025 – 9 May 2026	Succeeded by Sean Strickland
