= Hvardiiske =

Hvardiiske is name of several populated places in Ukraine:

== Towns (urban settlements) ==
- Hvardiiske, Novomoskovsk Raion
- Hvardiiske, Simferopol Raion

== Villages ==
- Hvardiiske, Terebovlia Raion

== Airbase ==
- Gvardeyskoye (air base), airbase in Crimea

== See also ==
- Gvardeysky (disambiguation)
