= Bethe Correia =

Brazilian mixed martial artist (born 1983)

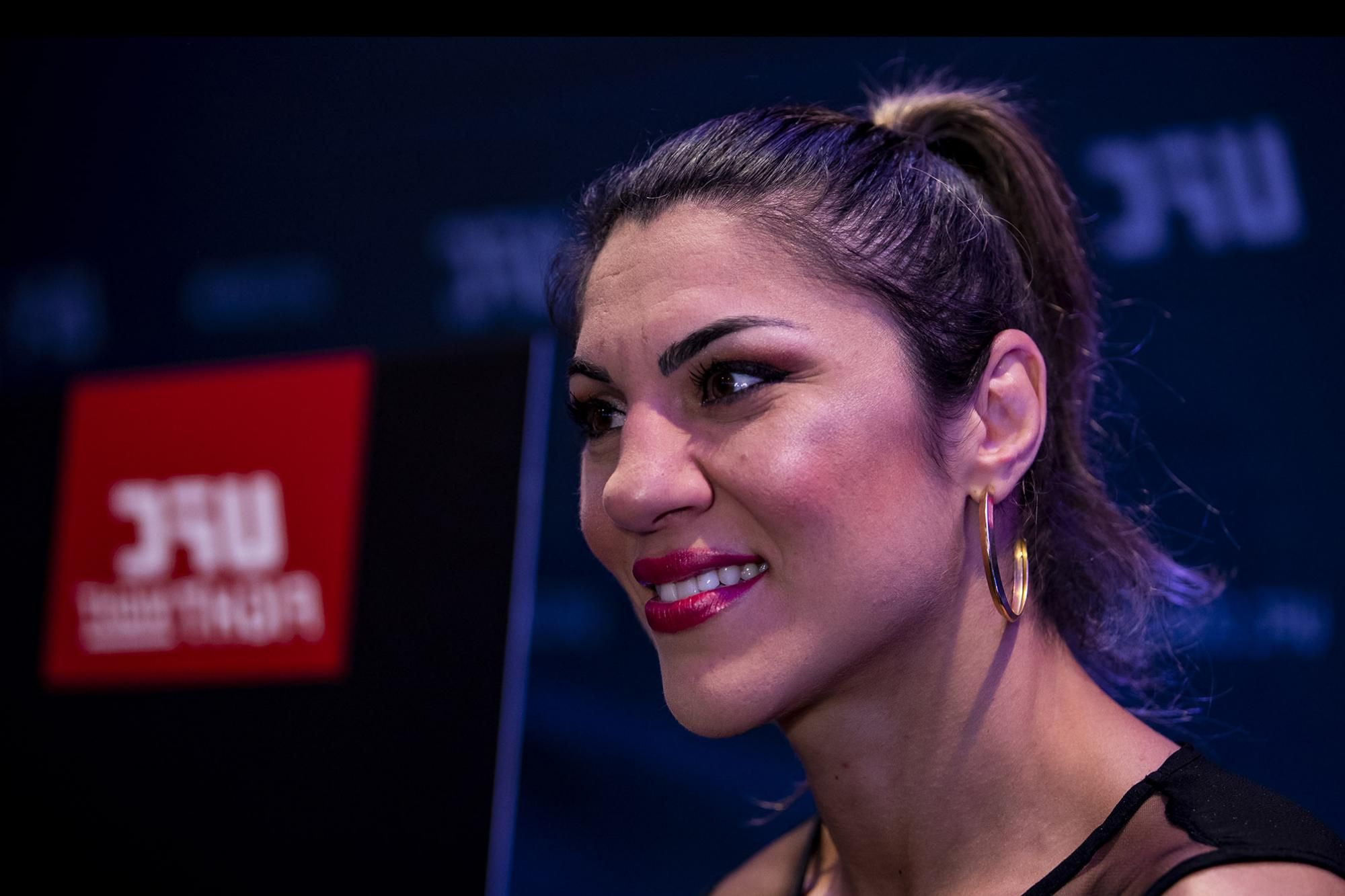
- Born: June 22, 1983 (age 43); Campina Grande, Paraíba, Brazil
- Nickname: Pitbull
- Height: 5 ft 5 in (1.65 m)
- Weight: 135 lb (61 kg; 9.6 st)
- Division: Bantamweight
- Reach: 64 in (163 cm)
- Style: Sanda, Kung Fu, Boxing, BJJ, Wrestling
- Fighting out of: Natal, Rio Grande do Norte, Brazil
- Team: Pitbull Brothers MMA; American Kickboxing Academy (AKA)
- Rank: Purple sash in Kung Fu; Purple belt in Brazilian Jiu-Jitsu
- Years active: 2012–2021

Mixed martial arts record
- Total: 18
- Wins: 11
- By knockout: 2
- By decision: 9
- Losses: 6
- By knockout: 2
- By submission: 1
- By decision: 3
- Draws: 1

Other information
- Mixed martial arts record from Sherdog

Bethe Correia (Brazilian Portuguese: [ˈbɛtʃi koˈʁejɐ]; born June 22, 1983) is a retired Brazilian mixed martial artist who competed in the women's bantamweight division. A professional mixed martial artist since 2012, Correia has competed in the Ultimate Fighting Championship.

== Early life ==
Bethe Correia was born in Campina Grande, Paraiba. She graduated from college with a degree in accounting, but gradually found that she was "too hyperactive for office work". While practicing Sanda, Correia concluded that fighting provided what had been "missing" in her life, and sought to compete in mixed martial arts (MMA).

== Mixed martial arts career ==
=== Early career ===
Correia studied a number of techniques at the onset of her MMA career, including Brazilian Jiu-Jitsu, Sanda, and Amateur Wrestling. She would eventually develop a preference for striking, particularly Boxing.

She made her professional MMA debut in her native Brazil in May 2012, defeating Daniela Maria da Silva by unanimous decision at the First Fight: Revelations show. Training with the "Pitbull" brothers, Patrício and Patricky Freire, she won her first six fights within 13 months.

=== Ultimate Fighting Championship ===
In October 2013, Correia signed a multi-fight deal with the Ultimate Fighting Championship (UFC). Correia noted, "Being in the UFC is having the chance to fight with the best in the world and accept big challenges. It's the dream of any fighter."

Correia made her promotional debut the following December as she faced MMA veteran Julie Kedzie at UFC Fight Night: Hunt vs. Bigfoot. At the time, Correia had fought in six professional bouts, while Kedzie had competed in 28. Correia won the fight via split decision.

She then faced Jessamyn Duke on April 26, 2014, at UFC 172. Despite her reach disadvantage, Correia used quick striking to out-point Duke and closed the gap by backing Duke toward the cage. She won the fight by unanimous decision (30–27, 29–28, and 30–27).

Correia faced Shayna Baszler on August 30, 2014, at UFC 177. After escaping a submission attempt in the first round, Correia became more aggressive with her striking and won by TKO at 1:56 of round 2.

==== Bantamweight title shot ====
Following her third consecutive win in the UFC, Correia was challenged by former Strikeforce bantamweight champions Sarah Kaufman and Miesha Tate. "A lot of girls from the UFC roster want a bout with me," Correia noted. She initially expressed interest in fighting Kaufman, but later stated that she was focused on getting a title shot against then-UFC bantamweight champion Ronda Rousey. "I want to face the champion," she said.

After her earlier victory over Duke, a member of Rousey's informal "Four Horsewomen" stable, Correia began campaigning for a title shot against Rousey, holding four fingers to the camera and symbolically putting one down. She did likewise after beating Horsewoman Baszler. In March 2015, UFC officials confirmed that Correia would fight Rousey for the title on August 1, 2015, at UFC 190.

Despite the fact that Rousey had finished all but one of her previous fights within a round, Correia displayed much confidence heading into the bout, stating that she planned to give Rousey the worst beating of her career. Subsequently, Correia lost the fight by knockout in only 34 seconds of the first round.

==== Post title shot ====
Following UFC 190, Correia expressed interest in bouts with Miesha Tate and Jessica Eye, but claimed that both women had declined. Eye denied the claim and offered to fight Correia in Spring 2016. In April 2016, Correia fought Raquel Pennington at UFC on Fox: Teixeira vs. Evans, losing via split decision.

Correia next faced Jessica Eye at UFC 203 on September 10, 2016, in Cleveland, Ohio. She won the fight via split decision.

Correia then faced Marion Reneau on March 11, 2017, at UFC Fight Night: Belfort vs. Gastelum. The back-and-forth fight saw strong moments from both women, ultimately ending in a majority draw (29–27 Reneau, 28–28, and 28–28). After the fight, Reneau disagreed with the result and said “I believe she won the first round; maybe she might’ve edged me out a little bit. I think I definitely won the second – and for sure I won the third round."

Correia faced Holly Holm at UFC Fight Night: Holm vs. Correia on June 17, 2017, in Singapore. She lost the fight via a head kick knockout in the third round.

Correia was scheduled to face Irene Aldana on August 4, 2018, at UFC 227. The bout was pulled from this event as Correia was forced to withdraw due to injury. The fight was not replaced.

The bout with Aldana was rescheduled and is expected to take place on May 11, 2019, at UFC 237. At the weigh-ins, Correia weighed in at 141 lbs, 5 pounds over the bantamweight limit of 136 lbs. She was fined 30% of her fight purse and the bout proceeded at catchweight. She lost the fight via submission in round three.

Correia faced Sijara Eubanks at UFC on ESPN+ 17. She won the fight by unanimous decision.

Correia was scheduled to face Pannie Kianzad on May 9, 2020, at UFC 250. Due to the event being relocated to the United States, Correia being unable to compete due to visa issues: However, on April 9, Dana White, the president of UFC announced that this event was postponed to a future date The bout eventually took place on July 26, 2020, at UFC on ESPN 14. She lost the fight via unanimous decision

Correia was scheduled to face Wu Yanan on December 5, 2020, at UFC on ESPN 19 However, due to visa issues which restricted travel for both participants, the matchup was rescheduled to January 16, 2021, at UFC on ABC 1. Subsequently, Correia was forced to pull out of the bout in early January after undergoing surgery to remove her appendix. She was replaced by promotional newcomer Joselyne Edwards.

Correia faced Karol Rosa on October 2, 2021, at UFC Fight Night 193. At the weigh-ins, Correia weighed in at 138.5 pounds, two and a half pounds over the women's bantamweight non-title fight limit. The bout proceeded at catchweight and Correia was fined 20% which went to her opponent Rosa. She lost the fight via unanimous decision. She announced her retirement from professional MMA competition after the fight.

== Fighting style ==
Correia is a striker who largely uses boxing and grappling techniques. She is recognized for her punching combinations, counter strikes, spinning back fists, and aggressive right hands. During her fight against Jessamyn Duke, she led by 100 strikes to Duke's 55.

Correia is known for her use of dirty boxing and cutting off the cage. While clinching, she will usually move the fight toward the fence and attack with flurries. At UFC 172, she used this technique to negate Jessamyn Duke's reach; she later used it to earn her stoppage against Shayna Baszler.

== Mixed martial arts record ==
Professional record breakdown
18 matches	11 wins	6 losses
By knockout	2	2
By submission	0	1
By decision	9	3
Draws	1	

Res.	Record	Opponent	Method	Event	Date	Round	Time	Location	Notes
Loss	11–6–1	Karol Rosa	Decision (unanimous)	UFC Fight Night: Santos vs. Walker	October 2, 2021	3	5:00	Las Vegas, Nevada, United States	Catchweight (138.5 lb) bout; Correia missed weight.
Loss	11–5–1	Pannie Kianzad	Decision (unanimous)	UFC on ESPN: Whittaker vs. Till	July 26, 2020	3	5:00	Abu Dhabi, United Arab Emirates	
Win	11–4–1	Sijara Eubanks	Decision (unanimous)	UFC Fight Night: Rodríguez vs. Stephens	September 21, 2019	3	5:00	Mexico City, Mexico	
Loss	10–4–1	Irene Aldana	Submission (armbar)	UFC 237	May 11, 2019	3	3:24	Rio de Janeiro, Brazil	Catchweight (141 lb) bout; Correia missed weight.
Loss	10–3–1	Holly Holm	KO (head kick and punch)	UFC Fight Night: Holm vs. Correia	June 17, 2017	3	1:09	Kallang, Singapore	
Draw	10–2–1	Marion Reneau	Draw (majority)	UFC Fight Night: Belfort vs. Gastelum	March 11, 2017	3	5:00	Fortaleza, Brazil	
Win	10–2	Jessica Eye	Decision (split)	UFC 203	September 10, 2016	3	5:00	Cleveland, Ohio, United States	
Loss	9–2	Raquel Pennington	Decision (split)	UFC on Fox: Teixeira vs. Evans	April 16, 2016	3	5:00	Tampa, Florida, United States	
Loss	9–1	Ronda Rousey	KO (punch)	UFC 190	August 1, 2015	1	0:34	Rio de Janeiro, Brazil	For the UFC Women's Bantamweight Championship.
Win	9–0	Shayna Baszler	TKO (punches)	UFC 177	August 30, 2014	2	1:56	Sacramento, California, United States	
Win	8–0	Jessamyn Duke	Decision (unanimous)	UFC 172	April 26, 2014	3	5:00	Baltimore, Maryland, United States	
Win	7–0	Julie Kedzie	Decision (split)	UFC Fight Night: Hunt vs. Bigfoot	December 7, 2013	3	5:00	Brisbane, Australia	
Win	6–0	Erica Paes	Decision (unanimous)	Jungle Fight 54	June 29, 2013	3	5:00	Barra do Piraí, Brazil	
Win	5–0	Juliete de Souza	Decision (unanimous)	WCC – W-Combat 17	June 1, 2013	3	5:00	Macapá, Brazil	
Win	4–0	Anne Karoline	TKO (punches)	Bokum Fight Championship	April 12, 2013	2	0:00	Aracaju, Brazil	
Win	3–0	Elaine Albuquerque	Decision (unanimous)	Heat FC 4 – The Return	October 18, 2012	3	5:00	Natal, Brazil	
Win	2–0	Daniely dos Santos	Decision (unanimous)	Fort MMA 2 – Higo vs. Kevin	July 27, 2012	3	5:00	Mossoró, Brazil	
Win	1–0	Daniela da Silva	Decision (unanimous)	First Fight: Revelations	May 31, 2012	3	5:00	Parnamirim, Brazil	

== Pay-per-view bouts ==
No	Event	Fight	Date	Venue	City	PPV buys
1.	UFC 190	Rousey vs. Correia	August 1, 2015	HSBC Arena	Rio de Janeiro, Brazil	900,000

== See also ==
- List of female mixed martial artists
