= Gvardeyskoye, Chechen Republic =

Village in Nadterechny District, Russia

Gvardeyskoye Гвардейское
- City
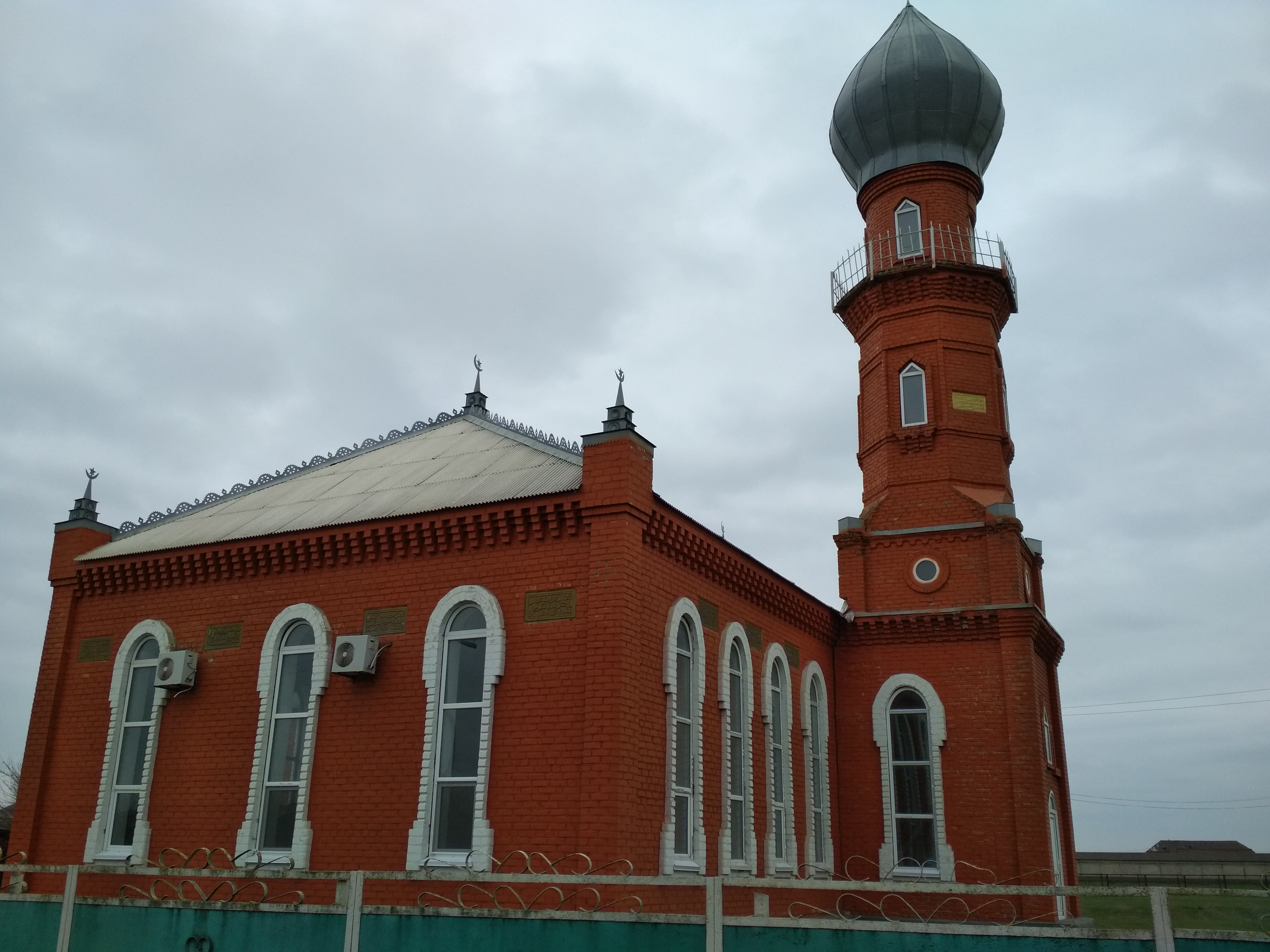
- A mosque in Gvardeyskoye
- Interactive map of Gvardeyskoye
- Location of Gvardeyskoye Gvardeyskoye (European Russia)
- Coordinates: 43°40′15″N 44°57′56″E
- Country: Russia
- Federal subject: Chechnya
- Founded: 1839
- Elevation: 108 m (354 ft)

Population
  - Estimate (2024): 8,836 )
- Time zone: UTC+3 (MSK)
- Postal code: 366823
- OKTMO ID: 96616410101

Gvardeyskoye (Russian: Гвардейское; Chechen: Іелин-Юрт) is a village in the Nadterechny District of Chechen Republic. According to the 2022 census, its population is 8,420.

== Notable people ==
- Khamzat Chimaev (born 1994) Russian-Emirati freestyle wrestler and UFC fighter
