= Antônio Rogério Nogueira =

Brazilian boxer and mixed martial arts fighter

- Born: 2 June 1976 (age 50); Vitória da Conquista, Bahia, Brazil
- Other names: Minotouro
- Height: 6 ft 2 in (1.88 m)
- Weight: 220 lb (100 kg; 16 st)
- Division: Light heavyweight (MMA); Bridgerweight (Boxing)
- Reach: 75 in (191 cm)
- Stance: Southpaw
- Fighting out of: Gardena, California, U.S.
- Team: Team Nogueira; Black House; Brazilian Top Team
- Rank: 3rd degree black belt in Brazilian Jiu-Jitsu
- Years active: 2000–2020

Professional boxing record
- Total: 1
- Wins: 1
- Losses: 0

Mixed martial arts record
- Total: 33
- Wins: 23
- By knockout: 8
- By submission: 6
- By decision: 9
- Losses: 10
- By knockout: 4
- By decision: 6

Other information
- Notable relatives: Antônio Rodrigo Nogueira, brother
- Mixed martial arts record from Sherdog

Antônio Rogério Nogueira
Medal record

Representing Brazil

Boxing

South American Games
Gold medal – first place	Buenos Aires 2006	Super Heavyweight

Pan American Games
Bronze medal – third place	Rio de Janeiro 2007	Super Heavyweight

Antônio Rogério Nogueira (Brazilian Portuguese pronunciation: [ɐ̃ˈtoni.u ʁoˈʒɛɾi.u noˈɡejɾɐ, ɐ̃ˈtonju -]; born 2 June 1976), also known as Minotouro or Lil Nog, is a Brazilian former mixed martial artist who most recently competed in the UFC. He is the twin brother of Antônio Rodrigo Nogueira, the "Minotauro" (lit. Minotaur), earning Rogério the nickname "Minotouro" (lit. mini bull). A proficient amateur boxer, he was the 2006 and 2007 Brazilian Super Heavyweight Champion. He also won a bronze medal in the 2007 Pan American Games.

== Background ==
Antônio Rogério Nogueira hails from the town of Vitória da Conquista, Brazil and trained in Brazilian Jiu-Jitsu under Ricardo de la Riva.

His brother is a former interim UFC Heavyweight Champion and PRIDE Heavyweight Champion. Nogueira says that it is not usual for Brazilian twins to have the same first name and that the twins' mother named them both after their father, Antônio Amielto.

Although they are identical twins, Nogueira can be distinguished from his brother by his lighter weight and shorter height, and by the presence of a scar on his brother's lower back.

The twins trained with Brazilian Top Team, then with Black House, and finally at Team Nogueira, where they also work as instructors.

== Mixed martial arts career ==
=== Early career ===
Before becoming a big star in PRIDE, Nogueira competed in DEEP and HooknShoot events and gained a record of 2-0, finishing both opponents in the very first round via armbar. Nogueira started training with the same team as his brother, Brazilian Top Team.

=== Pride Fighting Championships ===
Nogueira made his PRIDE Fighting Championships debut on 28 April 2002 at PRIDE 20 against Japanese pro wrestler/MMA fighter Yusuke Imamura, where he ended the fight in the first round with a guillotine choke in 35 seconds.

Nogueira lost his next fight to Vladimir Matyushenko by decision, but won his next with a victory over Tsuyoshi Kohsaka.

Nogueira fought again for PRIDE at PRIDE 24 against Guy Mezger. The fight went to the judges scorecards, and Nogueira won by majority decision. Nogueira next fought at PRIDE 25 against Kazuhiro Nakamura, who was making his pro MMA debut. Nakamura escaped multiple submissions, but Nogueria won in the second round with an armbar.

In his next fight with PRIDE, Nogueira was pitted against fighter and crowd favourite Kazushi Sakuraba in the main event of PRIDE Shockwave 2003. Nogueira won the bout via unanimous decision.

Nogueira beat Alex Stiebling in Korea, before returning to Japan to rematch Nakamura in the main event of PRIDE Bushido 4. Nogueira won a split decision victory. Nogueira won a unanimous decision victory at PRIDE 29 against Alistair Overeem in what was seen to be an even fight. Overeem escaped many of Nogueira's submission attempts, and Nogueira was close to finishing him in the third round.

Nogueira entered PRIDE's 2005 Middleweight Grand Prix next where he was slated to fight Dan Henderson in the opening round. Henderson fought Nogueira's twin brother Antônio Rodrigo Nogueira earlier in his career, and lost by armbar. Henderson also lost against Nogueira and was submitted late in the first round by an armbar.

Nogueira was matched up in the quarter-finals against Chute Boxe prospect Maurício Rua in a Brazilian Top Team/Chute Boxe clash. The first round of this fight is widely considered to be one of the better opening rounds in MMA history, with Nogueira dropping the rarely knocked down Shogun and rocking him later in the round. Shogun also mounted an effective offensive in this round. The second and third rounds belonged to Rua however, as he continued to land diving punches and knocked Nogueira down in the third. Rua went on to take the decision and eventually won the tournament. This fight ended Nogueira's eight fight winning streak and was the first fight he lost in three years.{{

After this fight Nogueira took some time off to heal injuries. He did not fight again until July 2006, where he rematched Overeem. He won a second-round TKO decision, when Overeem's corner threw in the towel after Nogueira staggered him and was continuing to land combos.

Nogueira fought in the United States for the second time in his career at PRIDE 33 against relatively unknown Sokoudjou. The fight was Sokoudjou's arrival into the mainstream MMA audience; he landed a high kick/left hook combo that knocked Nogueira out cleanly in what is considered to be one of the biggest upsets in all of MMA. PRIDE shutdown soon after this event. Nogueira defeated Todd Gouwenberg at an HCF show before signing a contract to compete with Affliction Entertainment on their Affliction branded shows. Nogueira fought Edwin Dewees next, knocking him out in the first round at Affliction: Banned, before defeating Moise Rimbon at a Sengoku show. Next, Nogueira foughtt Vladimir Matyushenko at Affliction: Day of Reckoning and won, knocking Matyushenko out late in the second round. After this Nogueira submitted Dion Staring in an MMA fight that took place in Brazil.

After Affliction shutdown in July 2009, Nogueira signed on to compete with the Ultimate Fighting Championship.

=== Ultimate Fighting Championship ===
On 28 August 2009, Dana White had confirmed that Nogueira had signed a contract with the UFC. Nogueira made his debut at UFC 106 against Luiz Cané. Nogueira made quick work of the Brazilian and dropped him with a sweeping left hook before finishing him off with punches on the mat at 1:56 of the first round.

Nogueira was scheduled to face Brandon Vera at UFC 109. However, Nogueira was forced off the card with a fractured ankle sustained while training.

His next fight was scheduled to be against former UFC Light-Heavyweight Champion Forrest Griffin at UFC 114; however, Griffin pulled out of the fight due to a shoulder injury. Nogueira instead fought Jason Brilz on short notice. In a controversial split decision, in which Brilz seemed to control the duration of the fight, Nogueira was declared the winner.

Nogueira faced undefeated, TUF 8 winner Ryan Bader on 25 September 2010 at UFC 119. He lost the fight via unanimous decision.

Nogueira was expected to face Tito Ortiz on 26 March 2011 at UFC Fight Night 24. However, Ortiz received a cut whilst training for his match with Nogueira and was forced to withdraw from the match. Ortiz was replaced by Phil Davis on short-notice, with just 6 weeks remaining until the fight. Nogueira lost via unanimous decision (30-27, 30-27, 30-27).

Nogueira was originally scheduled to face Rich Franklin at UFC 133 on 6 August 2011, in Philadelphia. However, Nogueira pulled out of the fight, citing a shoulder injury.

Nogueira defeated former UFC Light Heavyweight Champion Tito Ortiz on 10 December 2011 at UFC 140 via TKO (punches and elbows to the body) in the first round. In 3:15, he landed 54 significant strikes, the most of his UFC career.

Nogueira was expected to face Alexander Gustafsson on 14 April 2012 at UFC on Fuel TV 2. However, on 6 March, it was announced that Nogueira had pulled out of the bout, citing a knee injury.

Nogueira faced former UFC Light Heavyweight Champion Rashad Evans on 2 February 2013 at UFC 156. The bout remained on the feet for a majority of its duration in a largely uneventful fight where neither fighter was able to deliver any significant offense. Nogueira won the fight via unanimous decision.

Nogueira was expected to face Maurício Rua in a rematch on 15 June 2013 at UFC 161. However, Nogueira pulled out of the bout in the days leading up to the event citing a back injury. Chael Sonnen was briefly linked as a replacement for Nogueira. Though an alleged visa issue created a problem for Sonnen to get into Canada, resulting in Rua being pulled from the event altogether.

At a post-fight press conference in Manchester, Dana White said that Nogueira would be facing Alexander Gustafsson on 8 March 2014 at a UFC event in London. However just 5 days later Nogueira was forced out of the bout due to a lingering back injury. Later, reports came that said that Nogueira had never agreed to take the fight against Gustafsson at all.

Nogueira next faced Anthony Johnson on 26 July 2014 at UFC on Fox 12. He lost the fight via KO in the first round.

Ten years after their first fight, Nogueira had a rematch with Maurício Rua on 1 August 2015 at UFC 190. He lost the fight again by unanimous decision. Both participants were awarded Fight of the Night honors.

Nogueira next faced Patrick Cummins on 14 May 2016 at UFC 198. He won the fight via TKO in the first round.

A pairing with Alexander Gustafsson was scheduled for a third time and was expected to take place on 19 November 2016 at UFC Fight Night 100. However just days after the fight was announced, Gustafsson pulled out of the bout citing an injury. In turn, he was replaced by Ryan Bader. Nogueira lost the one-sided fight via TKO in the third round.

Nogueira was expected to face Ilir Latifi on 25 June 2017 at UFC Fight Night 112. However Nogueira pulled out of the fight on 17 May citing a neck injury.

Nogueira was to face Jared Cannonier on 16 December 2017 at UFC on Fox 26. However he was pulled from the bout on 19 October 2017 after being flagged by USADA for a potential violation. On 24 April 2018 Nogueira was cleared of intentionally using of Performance-enhancing drugs (PEDs) by USADA, as Nogueira had allegedly taken a tainted supplement which contained hydrochlorothiazide from the compounding pharmacies in Brazil.

In his first fight since returning from injury and suspension, Nogueira faced Sam Alvey on 22 September 2018 at UFC Fight Night 137. He won the fight via knockout in the second round. This win earned him the Performance of the Night award.

Nogueira faced Ryan Spann on 11 May 2019 at UFC 237. He lost the fight via knockout in the first round.

Nogueira was expected to face Trevor Smith on 16 November 2019 at UFC on ESPN+ 22. However, Nogueira was forced to pull out of the event due to injury, resulting in the cancellation of the bout.

As the final fight of his prevailing contract, the trilogy bout with Maurício Rua was expected to take place on May 9, 2020 at then UFC 250. Due to the event being relocated to the United States, Nogueira was unable to compete due to visa issues. On April 9, Dana White, the president of UFC announced that the event was postponed to a future date The bout eventually took place on July 26, 2020 at UFC on ESPN 14. He lost the fight via split decision and retired from professional MMA competition after the fight.

== Personal life ==
Nogueira and his wife welcomed their first daughter on 25 January 2010.

== Championships and accomplishments ==
=== Boxing ===
Status	Date	Championship	Weight	Location
Winner	2006	Brazilian Championship	Super Heavyweight	Brazil
Winner	2006	South American Championship	Super Heavyweight	Buenos Aires, Argentina
Winner	2007	Brazilian Championship	Super Heavyweight	Brazil
3rd	2007	XV Pan American Games	Super Heavyweight	Rio de Janeiro, Brazil

=== Mixed martial arts ===
- Ultimate Fighting Championship
  - Knockout of the Night (One time) vs. Luiz Cané
  - Fight of the Night (Two times) vs. Jason Brilz and Maurício Rua
  - Performance of the Night (One time) vs. Sam Alvey
  - 2023 UFC Forrest Griffin Community Award
  - UFC.com Awards
    - 2009: Ranked #2 Fight of the Year vs. Randy Couture
    - 2012: Ranked #6 Submission of the Year vs. Dave Herman
    - 2013: Ranked #8 Upset of the Year vs. Rashad Evans
- Sherdog
  - Fight of the Year (2005) vs. Maurício Rua on 26 June 2005

== Mixed martial arts record ==
Professional record breakdown
33 matches	23 wins	10 losses
By knockout	8	4
By submission	6	0
By decision	9	6

Res.	Record	Opponent	Method	Event	Date	Round	Time	Location	Notes
Loss	23–10	Maurício Rua	Decision (split)	UFC on ESPN: Whittaker vs. Till	26 July 2020	3	5:00	Abu Dhabi, United Arab Emirates	
Loss	23–9	Ryan Spann	KO (punches)	UFC 237	11 May 2019	1	2:07	Rio de Janeiro, Brazil	
Win	23–8	Sam Alvey	TKO (punches)	UFC Fight Night: Santos vs. Anders	22 September 2018	2	1:00	São Paulo, Brazil	Performance of the Night.
Loss	22–8	Ryan Bader	TKO (punches)	UFC Fight Night: Bader vs. Nogueira 2	19 November 2016	3	3:51	São Paulo, Brazil	
Win	22–7	Patrick Cummins	TKO (punches)	UFC 198	14 May 2016	1	4:52	Curitiba, Brazil	
Loss	21–7	Maurício Rua	Decision (unanimous)	UFC 190	1 August 2015	3	5:00	Rio de Janeiro, Brazil	Fight of the Night.
Loss	21–6	Anthony Johnson	KO (punches)	UFC on Fox: Lawler vs. Brown	26 July 2014	1	0:44	San Jose, California, United States	
Win	21–5	Rashad Evans	Decision (unanimous)	UFC 156	2 February 2013	3	5:00	Las Vegas, Nevada, United States	
Win	20–5	Tito Ortiz	TKO (punches and elbows to the body)	UFC 140	10 December 2011	1	3:15	Toronto, Ontario, Canada	
Loss	19–5	Phil Davis	Decision (unanimous)	UFC Fight Night: Nogueira vs. Davis	26 March 2011	3	5:00	Seattle, Washington, United States	
Loss	19–4	Ryan Bader	Decision (unanimous)	UFC 119	25 September 2010	3	5:00	Indianapolis, Indiana, United States	
Win	19–3	Jason Brilz	Decision (split)	UFC 114	29 May 2010	3	5:00	Las Vegas, Nevada, United States	Fight of the Night.
Win	18–3	Luiz Cané	TKO (punches)	UFC 106	21 November 2009	1	1:56	Las Vegas, Nevada, United States	Knockout of the Night.
Win	17–3	Dion Staring	Submission (triangle choke)	Jungle Fight 14: Ceará	9 May 2009	3	3:30	Fortaleza, Brazil	
Win	16–3	Vladimir Matyushenko	KO (knee)	Affliction: Day of Reckoning	24 January 2009	2	4:26	Anaheim, California, United States	
Win	15–3	Moise Rimbon	Decision (unanimous)	World Victory Road Presents: Sengoku 6	1 November 2008	3	5:00	Saitama, Japan	
Win	14–3	Edwin Dewees	TKO (punches)	Affliction: Banned	19 July 2008	1	4:06	Anaheim, California, United States	
Win	13–3	Todd Gouwenberg	TKO (knees and punches)	HCF: Destiny	1 February 2008	2	4:34	Calgary, Alberta, Canada	
Loss	12–3	Rameau Thierry Sokoudjou	KO (punch)	Pride 33	24 February 2007	1	0:23	Las Vegas, Nevada, United States	
Win	12–2	Alistair Overeem	TKO (corner stoppage)	Pride FC: Critical Countdown Absolute	1 July 2006	2	2:13	Saitama, Japan	
Loss	11–2	Maurício Rua	Decision (unanimous)	Pride Critical Countdown 2005	26 June 2005	3	5:00	Saitama, Japan	2005 Pride Middleweight Grand Prix Quarterfinal.
Win	11–1	Dan Henderson	Submission (armbar)	Pride Total Elimination 2005	23 April 2005	1	8:05	Osaka, Japan	2005 Pride Middleweight Grand Prix Opening Round.
Win	10–1	Alistair Overeem	Decision (unanimous)	Pride 29	20 February 2005	3	5:00	Saitama, Japan	
Win	9–1	Kazuhiro Nakamura	Decision (split)	Pride Bushido 4	19 July 2004	2	5:00	Nagoya, Japan	
Win	8–1	Alex Stiebling	Decision (unanimous)	Gladiator FC Day 1	26 June 2004	3	5:00	Seoul, South Korea	
Win	7–1	Kazushi Sakuraba	Decision (unanimous)	Pride Shockwave 2003	31 December 2003	3	5:00	Saitama, Japan	
Win	6–1	Kazuhiro Nakamura	Submission (armbar)	Pride 25	16 March 2003	2	3:49	Yokohama, Japan	
Win	5–1	Guy Mezger	Decision (split)	Pride 24	23 December 2002	3	5:00	Fukuoka, Japan	
Win	4–1	Tsuyoshi Kohsaka	Decision (unanimous)	Deep - 6th Impact	7 September 2002	3	5:00	Tokyo, Japan	Openweight bout.
Loss	3–1	Vladimir Matyushenko	Decision (unanimous)	UFO Legend	8 August 2002	3	5:00	Tokyo, Japan	
Win	3–0	Yusuke Imamura	Submission (guillotine choke)	Pride 20	28 April 2002	1	0:35	Yokohama, Japan	Heavyweight bout.
Win	2–0	Jim Theobald	Submission (armbar)	HooknShoot Overdrive	9 March 2002	1	4:59	Evansville, Indiana, United States	
Win	1–0	Katsuhisa Fujii	Technical Submission (armbar)	Deep - 2nd Impact	18 August 2001	1	3:59	Yokohama, Japan	

== Professional boxing record ==
1 fight	1 win	0 losses
By decision	1	0

No.	Result	Record	Opponent	Type	Round, time	Date	Location	Notes
1	Win	1–0	Leonardo Augusto Guimarães	UD	8 (8); 3:00	Jan 30, 2022	Music Park BC, Balneário Camboriú, Santa Catarina, Brazil	

=== Exhibition ===
1 fight	1 win	0 losses
By knockout	1	0

No.	Result	Record	Opponent	Type	Round, time	Date	Location	Notes
1	Win	1–0	Fábio Tadala	KO	2 (5); 1:00	May 17, 2025	São Paulo, Brazil	Two-minute rounds

== See also ==
- List of current UFC fighters
- List of male mixed martial artists
