= Maurício Rua =

Brazilian mixed martial artist (born 1981)

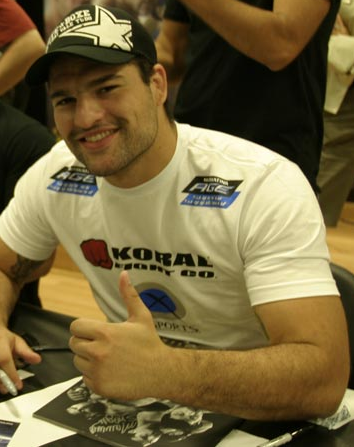
- Rua in 2006
- Born: Maurício Milani Rua; 25 November 1981 (age 44); Curitiba, Brazil
- Nickname: Shogun
- Height: 6 ft 1 in (1.85 m)
- Weight: 205 lb (93 kg; 14 st 9 lb)
- Division: Light heavyweight Heavyweight
- Reach: 76 in (193 cm)
- Fighting out of: Curitiba, Brazil
- Team: Chute Boxe Academy (until 2008); Universidade Da Luta (2008–present); Kings MMA (2014–present)
- Rank: Black prajied in Muay Thai; Black belt in Brazilian Jiu-Jitsu under Antônio "Nino" Schembri
- Years active: 2002–2023 (MMA)

Mixed martial arts record
- Total: 42
- Wins: 27
- By knockout: 21
- By submission: 1
- By decision: 5
- Losses: 14
- By knockout: 7
- By submission: 3
- By decision: 4
- Draws: 1

Other information
- Notable relatives: Murilo Rua (brother)
- Website: mauriciorua.com
- Mixed martial arts record from Sherdog

Maurício Milani Rua (Portuguese pronunciation: [mawˈɾisiu ˈʁuɐ]; born 25 November 1981), also known as Shogun, is a Brazilian professional mixed martial artist. He competed in the Light Heavyweight division of the Ultimate Fighting Championship (UFC), where he is a former UFC Light Heavyweight Champion. A professional competitor since 2002, Rua is also the 2005 PRIDE Middleweight Grand Prix Champion.

== Background ==
Rua was born on 25 November 1981 and raised in Curitiba, Brazil and is of Italian, and Portuguese descent. Rua's father is a businessman and his mother is a former track athlete and, as of 2005, a marathon runner. He has an older brother, Murilo (nicknamed Ninja, born 1980), and a younger brother, Marcos (nicknamed Shaolin). Both are mixed martial artists training at Universidade da luta, though Marcos does not compete at a professional level. The Rua brothers occasionally take 10-kilometre runs with their mother. Rua began training in Muay Thai at the age of 15 and Brazilian Jiu-Jitsu at the age of 17. Rua followed his older brother in training at the Chute Boxe Academy, and was successful in BJJ championships at the blue and purple belt levels. In addition to Muay Thai and Brazilian Jiu-Jitsu, by 2007 he was also training wrestling and boxing.

== Mixed martial arts career ==
=== Early career ===
Rua started his professional career at vale tudo events in Brazil, achieving three stoppages due to strikes, including a win over future Chute Boxe Academy teammate Evangelista Santos. In a fast-paced bout, Santos matched Rua on the feet until Rua took Santos to the ground and forced a stoppage due to strikes from mount. Shogun then entered the International Fighting Championships's (IFC) Global Domination Tournament. Rua won his first bout against Erik Wanderlei due to punches, and in the second bout got the first submission loss of his career against Renato Sobral with a guillotine in the third round.

=== PRIDE Fighting Championship ===
==== PRIDE Debut, Bushido and PRIDE 29 ====
Following his victory in the IFC tournament, Shogun made his way to Japan to enter the PRIDE organization. He made his PRIDE debut at the inaugural PRIDE Bushido 1, a side promotion for lighter fighters. In his three Bushido appearances, Rua defeated Akira Shoji, Akihiro Gono, and Yasuhito Namekawa, all by strikes in the first round.

Rua graduated to his debut in a main PRIDE event at PRIDE 29, where he faced former professional wrestler Hiromitsu Kanehara, a Japanese fighter known for his toughness. Rua defeated Kanehara by stomps early in the first round.

==== PRIDE 2005 Middleweight Grand Prix ====
He entered the PRIDE 2005 Middleweight Grand Prix tournament as an underdog. For the first round of the tournament at PRIDE Total Elimination 2005, he faced Quinton Jackson, whom he had challenged after Jackson won a controversial split decision over Murilo Rua at PRIDE 29. Rua dominated the favored fighter from beginning to end, breaking Jackson's ribs with knee strikes and ending the fight in dramatic fashion with soccer kicks to the face in the first round. Jackson later said that Shogun was the best fighter he had ever fought. In the second round at PRIDE Critical Countdown 2005, Rua faced Antônio Rogério Nogueira, a member of Chute Boxe's rival academy Brazilian Top Team. Rua defeated Nogueira by unanimous decision. On 28 August 2005, Rua participated in PRIDE Final Conflict 2005, in which the last two bouts of the tournament were held on the same night. Rua defeated Alistair Overeem by TKO in the first round, while Ricardo Arona defeated Rua's teammate Wanderlei Silva by decision. Rua and Arona faced each other in the final bout of the tournament. At 2:54 in the first round, Rua knocked Arona out with punches to win the bout and become the 2005 Middleweight Grand Prix Champion. He received a black belt in Brazilian jiu-jitsu from Nino Schembri afterwards, a process that only took him four years from when he got his purple belt. This wrapped up a year in which he won Fighter of the Year honors from Sherdog.com.

==== Incident with Hammer House ====
In the next fight after his Grand Prix win, Shogun faced Heavyweight wrestling star and PRIDE Grand Prix 2000 Champion Mark Coleman at PRIDE 31. As Coleman executed a takedown, Rua landed awkwardly and dislocated his elbow, forcing a stoppage due to injury. Coleman was pulled off of Shogun by the referee, and was confronted immediately by members of Rua's corner. This led to an in-ring brawl between Hammer House and Chute Boxe.

==== End of PRIDE career ====
At PRIDE Final Conflict Absolute he defeated French kickboxer Cyrille Diabate by tapout due to stomps. At Pride 32 he submitted former UFC Heavyweight Champion Kevin Randleman with a kneebar at 2:35 of the first round, the only submission victory of his career. In his final PRIDE appearance at Pride 33, he fought a rematch with Alistair Overeem and knocked the Dutch fighter out at 3:37 of the first round.

By the end of his run at PRIDE, Rua was ranked as the top Light heavyweight in the world by Nokaut, Sherdog, and MMAWeekly.com.

=== Ultimate Fighting Championship ===
After the UFC bought out PRIDE, Shogun signed on with the UFC and made his debut in the organization at UFC 76. Facing The Ultimate Fighter 1 Winner Forrest Griffin, Rua was favoured to win. However, Rua had difficulty with Griffin and became exhausted early on and was dominated for the remainder of the fight. He succumbed to a rear-naked choke in the final seconds of the third round. He then had surgery for a pre-existing knee injury.

Rua left Chute Boxe in January 2008 and opened his own camp, Universidade da luta, with his brother Murilo in Curitiba.

In the months following his surgery Rua completely reruptured damaged ligaments during training and was forced to undergo a second knee surgery. This forced him to drop out of UFC 85. He was granted a rematch with Mark Coleman at UFC 93 in Dublin. Shogun defeated Coleman by TKO with 24 seconds left in the third round. The fight earned co-Fight of the Night honors and a $40,000 bonus. In spite of the award, Rua drew criticism from fans for his lackluster performance against Coleman, who was 44 years old at the time and had not competed in over two years.

Rua's next fight took place at UFC 97 in Montreal against former longtime UFC Light heavyweight Champion Chuck Liddell. Rua won by KO due to strikes. With this victory, Rua returned to the top-ten rankings for the Light heavyweight division, and the UFC decided to put him next in line for a title shot.

==== Title bouts with Machida ====
At UFC 104 Shogun lost by unanimous decision to UFC Light heavyweight Champion Lyoto Machida. All three judges scored the bout 48–47 in Machida's favor. Journalists and UFC President Dana White had scored the fight in Rua's favor.

Due to the controversy of the UFC 104 decision, a rematch was immediately announced and took place at UFC 113 on 8 May 2010 in Montreal. Rua won via knockout at 3:35 of round 1, after dropping Machida with a right and following up with punches on the ground. He was awarded the UFC Light heavyweight Championship, becoming just the second fighter to have won PRIDE and UFC titles. Following the victory, Rua underwent surgery in June to repair a knee injured during the bout against Machida.

==== UFC Light heavyweight Champion ====
Rua's first title defense was scheduled on 19 March 2011 against Rashad Evans, who had won by unanimous decision over Quinton Jackson at UFC 114 on 29 May 2010. However, following Jon Jones's victory over Ryan Bader at UFC 126, it was announced that Evans had blown his knee out in training and would not be able to face Rua. Jones was told during his post-fight interview that the UFC wanted him to replace Evans against Rua for the UFC Light Heavyweight Championship. Jones accepted and the fight was programmed for UFC 128. Quinton Jackson was also offered the title fight but declined, as six weeks' notice did not provide enough time to make weight.

In the title fight, Jones began the fight with a flying knee to the head. Rua later said the blow greatly affected his performance for the rest of the bout. Jones kept the pressure on Rua throughout the rest of the fight, utilizing unorthodox striking and ground and pound and winning the fight via TKO in Round 3.

==== Post title fights ====
After the loss to Jones, Rua's rematch with Forrest Griffin took place on 27 August 2011 at UFC 134. In a match that looked like the complete opposite of their original bout, Shogun demonstrated good head movement and footwork, as well as good accuracy and striking power, to win the bout via KO early in the first round. Rua had now avenged three of his six losses.

Rua faced Dan Henderson on 19 November 2011 at UFC 139, losing via unanimous decision. Henderson was in control for most of the first three rounds, dropping Rua in the third. In the fourth round, the momentum started to shift towards Rua, who was able to mount Henderson. Despite the decision loss, Rua was awarded a Fight of the Night bonus award. This fight is widely viewed as the "Fight of the Year" for 2011. This fight was also inducted into the 2018 UFC Hall of Fame.

Rua was expected to face Thiago Silva on 21 July 2012, at UFC 149. However, Silva was forced out of the bout with an injury.

Rua faced Brandon Vera on 4 August 2012, at UFC on Fox: Shogun vs. Vera. In a back-and-forth affair, Shogun managed to drop Vera several times and won by TKO due to punches in the fourth round.

Rua faced Alexander Gustafsson on 8 December 2012, at UFC on Fox 5. He lost the fight by unanimous decision.

Rua was expected to face Antônio Rogério Nogueira in a rematch at UFC 161. However, Nogueira pulled out of the bout in the days leading up to the event citing a back injury. Perennial multi-divisional contender Chael Sonnen was briefly linked as a replacement for Nogueira but eventually Rua was pulled from the event altogether.

On 17 August 2013, at UFC Fight Night 26, Rua faced Chael Sonnen in the main event. He lost the fight via a guillotine choke submission in the first round.

Rua next faced James Te Huna on 7 December 2013, at UFC Fight Night 33. He won the fight via first round knockout. The win also earned Rua his third Knockout of the Night bonus award.

A rematch with Dan Henderson took place on 23 March 2014 at UFC Fight Night 38. After winning the first two rounds and scoring a knockdown in each, he was defeated via strikes in the third round. Despite the TKO loss, Rua was given his third Fight of the Night bonus award, his second for a bout against Henderson. Rua sustained a broken nose in his fight with Henderson that required surgery.

On 29 October 2014, it was announced that Rua would coach opposite Anderson Silva for The Ultimate Fighter: Brazil 4, which began filming in early 2015. Despite being coaches on the show, the two fighters will not face each other at the end of the season.

In September 2014, Rua revealed that he had signed a new, eight-fight contract with the UFC. Rua was expected to face Jimi Manuwa on 8 November 2014 at UFC Fight Night 56. However, on 29 October, it was revealed that Manuwa was injured and was replaced by Ovince St. Preux. Rua lost the fight via knockout at just 34 seconds into the first round, the fastest knockout loss of his career.

Ten years after their first bout, Rua had a rematch against former opponent Antônio Rogério Nogueira on 1 August 2015 at UFC 190. He won the fight by unanimous decision and both participants were awarded Fight of the Night honors.

A long discussed bout against Rashad Evans was rescheduled and was expected to take place on 16 April 2016 at UFC on Fox 19. However, Rua was pulled from the fight on 9 March in favor of a matchup with Corey Anderson a couple of weeks later at UFC 198. Rua was awarded a split decision victory.

Rua next faced Gian Villante on 11 March 2017 at UFC Fight Night 106. He won the fight via technical knock-out in the third round.

A rematch with Ovince Saint Preux was expected to take place on 22 September 2017 at UFC Fight Night 117. However, Rua pulled out of the fight as the event was approaching on 16 September and was replaced by returning veteran Yushin Okami.

Rua was expected to face Volkan Oezdemir on 12 May 2018 at UFC Fight Night 129. However it was reported on 13 April 2018 that Oezdemir was pulled from the event due to alleged visa issues restricting his travel to Chile. The pairing was left intact and rescheduled for 22 July 2018 at UFC Fight Night 134, However the bout was cancelled once again after promotion officials elected to pull Oezdemir from that fight in favor of a matchup against Alexander Gustafsson the following month at UFC 227. He was replaced by Anthony Smith. Rua lost the fight via knockout in the first round.

Rua faced Tyson Pedro on 2 December 2018 at UFC Fight Night 142. He won the fight via technical knockout in round three, finishing Pedro with a flurry of strikes after Pedro suffered a leg injury and was unable to defend himself. This win earned him the Performance of the Night award.

Rua was expected to face Sam Alvey on 16 November 2019 at UFC on ESPN+ 22. However, Alvey was removed from the fight on 25 October due to a broken hand and was replaced by Paul Craig. After three rounds, the back-and-forth fight was declared a split draw.

A third bout with Antônio Rogério Nogueira was scheduled to take place on 9 May 2020 at UFC 250. However, the bout was postponed due to the COVID-19 pandemic. The bout eventually took place on 26 July 2020 at UFC on ESPN 14. He won the fight via split decision.

A rematch with Paul Craig took place on 21 November 2020 at UFC 255. He lost the fight via technical knockout in round two when he tapped to strikes for the second time in his career.

Rua had a rematch against Ovince Saint Preux on 7 May 2022 at UFC 274. He lost the fight via split decision.

Rua faced Ihor Potieria on January 21, 2023, at UFC 283. He lost the fight via technical knockout in the first round and Rua announced his retirement during the post-fight interview.

Hall of Fame

At UFC 301 on May 4, 2024, it was announced that Rua would be inducted into the 2024 UFC Hall of Fame under the Modern Wing.

=== Global Fight League ===
Rua was scheduled to come out of retirement to face Yoel Romero at a to be announced date and location. However, Rua withdrew for unknown reasons and was replaced by Gegard Mousasi. In turn, in April 2025, it was reported that all GFL events were cancelled indefinitely.

== Professional boxing career ==
Rua competed against fellow UFC Light Heavyweight Champion Glover Teixeira in the main event of Spaten Fight Night 3 on 29 Aug 2026. He lost the match by decision.

== Personal life ==
On 12 September 2007, Rua married physiotherapist Renata Ribeiro. Their first child, a daughter, was born on 15 January 2010.

Before becoming a fighter, Rua worked as a model in Brazil, doing books, pictures, and even fashion shows for brands. Of this time, he once said "The first work is fight, and the second is model."

== Championships and accomplishments ==
- PRIDE Fighting Championships
  - 2005 PRIDE Middleweight Grand Prix Champion
- Ultimate Fighting Championship
  - UFC Light Heavyweight Championship (One time)
  - UFC Hall of Fame (Fight Wing, Class of 2018) vs. Dan Henderson 1 at UFC 139
  - UFC Hall of Fame (Modern Wing, Class of 2024)
  - Knockout of the Night (Three times) vs. Chuck Liddell, Lyoto Machida 2 and James Te Huna
  - Fight of the Night (Four times) vs. Mark Coleman, Dan Henderson (x2), Antônio Rogério Nogueira
  - Performance of the Night (One time) vs. Tyson Pedro
  - Tied (Jon Jones & Ovince Saint Preux) for second most fight-night bonuses in UFC Light Heavyweight division history (8)
  - Second most knockouts in UFC Light Heavyweight division history (8)
    - Third most knockouts in Zuffa, LLC (UFC, Pride, WEC, Strikeforce) history (17) (behind Wanderlei Silva and Mirko Cro Cop)
  - Second most bouts in modern UFC Light Heavyweight division history (24)
  - Tied (Chuck Liddell & Khalil Rountree Jr.) for most knockdowns landed in UFC Light Heavyweight division history (14)
    - Tied (Chuck Liddell, Lyoto Machida, Junior dos Santos, Thiago Santos & Khalil Rountree Jr.) for sixth most knockdowns landed in UFC history (14)
  - Fourth most significant strikes landed in UFC Light Heavyweight division history (888)
  - Third most total strikes landed in UFC Light Heavyweight division history (1337)
    - Tied (Anderson Silva) for fourth most knockdowns landed in Zuffa, LLC (UFC, Pride, WEC, Strikeforce) history (19)
  - Tied (Paul Craig, Anthony Smith & Nikita Krylov) for fifth most finishes in UFC Light Heavyweight division history (8)
  - Holds wins over six former UFC champions — Quinton Jackson, Mark Coleman, Kevin Randleman, Chuck Liddell, Lyoto Machida and Forest Griffin.
  - UFC.com Awards
    - 2009: Ranked #5 Fighter of the Year, Loss of the Year vs. Lyoto Machida 1 & Ranked #9 Fight of the Year vs. Lyoto Machida 1
    - 2010 Half-Year Awards: Best Fighter of the 1HY, Ranked #2 Knockout of the Year vs. Lyoto Machida, Ranked #7 Knockout of the Year vs. Chuck Liddell & Ranked #3 Fighter of the Year
    - 2011: Fight of the Year vs. Dan Henderson 1
    - 2013: Ranked #3 Knockout of the Year vs. James Te Huna
    - 2014: Ranked #9 Fight of the Year vs. Dan Henderson 2
- FanSided
  - 2000s #6 Ranked MMA Fighter of the Decade
- World MMA Awards
  - 2010 Knockout of the Year vs. Lyoto Machida at UFC 113
- Sherdog
  - 2005 Fighter of the Year
  - 2005 Fight of the Year versus Antônio Rogério Nogueira on 26 June
  - 2009 Comeback Fighter of the Year
  - Mixed Martial Arts Hall of Fame
- Wrestling Observer Newsletter awards
  - 2011 Fight of the Year versus Dan Henderson on 19 November
- Inside MMA
  - 2011 Fight of the Year Bazzie Award vs. Dan Henderson
- MMA Fighting
  - 2005 Light Heavyweight Fighter of the Year

== Mixed martial arts record ==
Professional record breakdown
42 matches	27 wins	14 losses
By knockout	21	7
By submission	1	3
By decision	5	4
Draws	1	

Res.	Record	Opponent	Method	Event	Date	Round	Time	Location	Notes
Loss	27–14–1	Ihor Potieria	TKO (punches)	UFC 283	21 January 2023	1	4:05	Rio de Janeiro, Brazil	
Loss	27–13–1	Ovince Saint Preux	Decision (split)	UFC 274	7 May 2022	3	5:00	Phoenix, Arizona, United States	
Loss	27–12–1	Paul Craig	TKO (submission to punches)	UFC 255	21 November 2020	2	3:36	Las Vegas, Nevada, United States	
Win	27–11–1	Antônio Rogério Nogueira	Decision (split)	UFC on ESPN: Whittaker vs. Till	26 July 2020	3	5:00	Abu Dhabi, United Arab Emirates	
Draw	26–11–1	Paul Craig	Draw (split)	UFC Fight Night: Błachowicz vs. Jacaré	16 November 2019	3	5:00	São Paulo, Brazil	
Win	26–11	Tyson Pedro	TKO (punches)	UFC Fight Night: dos Santos vs. Tuivasa	2 December 2018	3	0:43	Adelaide, Australia	Performance of the Night.
Loss	25–11	Anthony Smith	KO (elbow)	UFC Fight Night: Shogun vs. Smith	22 July 2018	1	1:29	Hamburg, Germany	
Win	25–10	Gian Villante	TKO (punches)	UFC Fight Night: Belfort vs. Gastelum	11 March 2017	3	0:59	Fortaleza, Brazil	
Win	24–10	Corey Anderson	Decision (split)	UFC 198	14 May 2016	3	5:00	Curitiba, Brazil	
Win	23–10	Antônio Rogério Nogueira	Decision (unanimous)	UFC 190	1 August 2015	3	5:00	Rio de Janeiro, Brazil	Fight of the Night.
Loss	22–10	Ovince Saint Preux	KO (punches)	UFC Fight Night: Shogun vs. Saint Preux	8 November 2014	1	0:34	Uberlândia, Brazil	
Loss	22–9	Dan Henderson	TKO (punches)	UFC Fight Night: Shogun vs. Henderson 2	23 March 2014	3	1:31	Natal, Brazil	Fight of the Night.
Win	22–8	James Te Huna	KO (punch)	UFC Fight Night: Hunt vs. Bigfoot	7 December 2013	1	1:03	Brisbane, Australia	Knockout of the Night.
Loss	21–8	Chael Sonnen	Submission (guillotine choke)	UFC Fight Night: Shogun vs. Sonnen	17 August 2013	1	4:47	Boston, Massachusetts, United States	
Loss	21–7	Alexander Gustafsson	Decision (unanimous)	UFC on Fox: Henderson vs. Diaz	8 December 2012	3	5:00	Seattle, Washington, United States	
Win	21–6	Brandon Vera	TKO (punches)	UFC on Fox: Shogun vs. Vera	4 August 2012	4	4:09	Los Angeles, California, United States	
Loss	20–6	Dan Henderson	Decision (unanimous)	UFC 139	19 November 2011	5	5:00	San Jose, California, United States	Fight of the Night. Fight of the Year (2011).
Win	20–5	Forrest Griffin	KO (punches)	UFC 134	27 August 2011	1	1:53	Rio de Janeiro, Brazil	
Loss	19–5	Jon Jones	TKO (punches and knees)	UFC 128	19 March 2011	3	2:37	Newark, New Jersey, United States	Lost the UFC Light Heavyweight Championship.
Win	19–4	Lyoto Machida	KO (punches)	UFC 113	8 May 2010	1	3:35	Montreal, Quebec, Canada	Won the UFC Light Heavyweight Championship. Knockout of the Night.
Loss	18–4	Lyoto Machida	Decision (unanimous)	UFC 104	24 October 2009	5	5:00	Los Angeles, California, United States	For the UFC Light Heavyweight Championship.
Win	18–3	Chuck Liddell	TKO (punches)	UFC 97	18 April 2009	1	4:28	Montreal, Quebec, Canada	Knockout of the Night.
Win	17–3	Mark Coleman	TKO (punches)	UFC 93	17 January 2009	3	4:36	Dublin, Ireland	Fight of the Night.
Loss	16–3	Forrest Griffin	Submission (rear-naked choke)	UFC 76	22 September 2007	3	4:45	Anaheim, California, United States	
Win	16–2	Alistair Overeem	KO (punches)	PRIDE 33	24 February 2007	1	3:37	Las Vegas, Nevada, United States	
Win	15–2	Kazuhiro Nakamura	Decision (unanimous)	PRIDE Shockwave 2006	31 December 2006	3	5:00	Saitama, Japan	
Win	14–2	Kevin Randleman	Submission (kneebar)	PRIDE 32	21 October 2006	1	2:35	Las Vegas, Nevada, United States	
Win	13–2	Cyrille Diabaté	TKO (stomps)	PRIDE Final Conflict Absolute	10 September 2006	1	5:29	Saitama, Japan	Return to Middleweight (205 lb).
Loss	12–2	Mark Coleman	TKO (broken arm)	PRIDE 31	26 February 2006	1	0:49	Saitama, Japan	Heavyweight debut.
Win	12–1	Ricardo Arona	KO (punches)	PRIDE Final Conflict 2005	28 August 2005	1	2:54	Saitama, Japan	Won the 2005 Pride Middleweight Grand Prix.
Win	11–1	Alistair Overeem	TKO (punches)	PRIDE Final Conflict 2005	28 August 2005	1	6:42	Saitama, Japan	2005 Pride Middleweight Grand Prix Semifinal.
Win	10–1	Antônio Rogério Nogueira	Decision (unanimous)	PRIDE Critical Countdown 2005	26 June 2005	3	5:00	Saitama, Japan	2005 Pride Middleweight Grand Prix Quarterfinal.
Win	9–1	Quinton Jackson	TKO (soccer kicks)	PRIDE Total Elimination 2005	23 April 2005	1	4:47	Osaka, Japan	2005 Pride Middleweight Grand Prix Opening Round.
Win	8–1	Hiromitsu Kanehara	TKO (stomp)	PRIDE 29	20 February 2005	1	1:40	Saitama, Japan	
Win	7–1	Yasuhito Namekawa	TKO (punches)	PRIDE Bushido 5	14 October 2004	1	6:02	Osaka, Japan	
Win	6–1	Akihiro Gono	TKO (soccer kicks)	PRIDE Bushido 2	15 February 2004	1	9:04	Kanagawa, Japan	
Win	5–1	Akira Shoji	KO (punches)	PRIDE Bushido 1	5 October 2003	1	3:47	Saitama, Japan	
Loss	4–1	Renato Sobral	Submission (guillotine choke)	IFC: Global Domination	6 September 2003	3	3:07	Denver, Colorado, United States	IFC Light heavyweight Tournament Semifinal.
Win	4–0	Erik Wanderley	TKO (punches)	IFC: Global Domination	6 September 2003	2	2:54	Denver, Colorado, United States	IFC Light heavyweight Tournament Opening Round.
Win	3–0	Evangelista Santos	TKO (punches)	Meca World Vale Tudo 9	1 August 2003	1	9:22	Rio de Janeiro, Brazil	
Win	2–0	Angelo de Oliveira	TKO (soccer kicks)	Meca World Vale Tudo 8	16 May 2003	1	0:55	Curitiba, Brazil	
Win	1–0	Rafael Freitas	KO (kick)	Meca World Vale Tudo 7	8 November 2002	1	4:00	Curitiba, Brazil	

== Boxing record ==
=== Professional ===
1 fight	0 wins	1 loss
By decision	0	1

No.	Result	Record	Opponent	Type	Round, time	Date	Location	Notes
1	Loss	0–1	Glover Teixeira	DEC	8	29 Aug 2026	Mercado Livre Arena Pacaembu, São Paulo, Brazil	

== Pay-per-view bouts ==
No.	Event	Fight	Date	Venue	City	PPV Buys
1.	UFC 104	Machida vs. Shogun	October 24, 2009	Staples Center	Los Angeles, California, United States	500,000
2.	UFC 113	Machida vs. Shogun 2	May 8, 2010	Bell Centre	Montreal, Quebec, Canada	520,000
3.	UFC 128	Shogun vs. Jones	March 19, 2011	Prudential Center	Newark, New Jersey, United States	445,000
4.	UFC 139	Shogun vs. Henderson	November 19, 2011	HP Pavilion	San Jose, California, United States	290,000

== See also ==
- List of male mixed martial artists
- List of PRIDE champions
- List of UFC champions

Preceded by Lyoto Machida	11th UFC Light Heavyweight Champion; 8 May 2010 – 20 March 2011	Succeeded by Jon Jones
Preceded by Wanderlei Silva	Pride FC Middleweight Tournament winner 28 August 2005	
