= Gvardeysky, Volgograd Oblast =

Gvardeysky Гвардейский
- Khutor
- Location within Volgograd Oblast Location within Russia
- Coordinates: 49°08′N 43°00′E
- Country: Russia
- Region: Volgograd Oblast
- District: Kletsky District
- Time zone: UTC+4:00

Gvardeysky (Russian: Гвардейский) is a rural locality (a khutor) in Zakharovskoye Rural Settlement, Kletsky District, Volgograd Oblast, Russia. The population was 193 as of 2010. There are 11 streets.

== Geography ==
Gvardeysky is located 32 km southwest of Kletskaya (the district's administrative centre) by road. Zakharov is the nearest rural locality.
