= UFC 190 =

UFC mixed martial arts event in 2015

UFC 190: Rousey vs. Correia
- The poster for UFC 190: Rousey vs. Correia
- Promotion: Ultimate Fighting Championship
- Date: August 1, 2015
- Venue: HSBC Arena
- City: Rio de Janeiro, Brazil
- Attendance: 14,723
- Buyrate: 900,000

Event chronology
UFC on Fox: Dillashaw vs. Barão 2	UFC 190: Rousey vs. Correia	UFC Fight Night: Teixeira vs. Saint Preux

UFC 190: Rousey vs. Correia was a mixed martial arts event held on August 1, 2015, at the HSBC Arena in Rio de Janeiro, Brazil.

== Background ==
The event was headlined by a UFC Women's Bantamweight Championship bout between former UFC Bantamweight champion Ronda Rousey and #5 contender Bethe Correia.

The lightweight and bantamweight finals of The Ultimate Fighter: Brazil 4 also took place at this event. The finale was initially planned to take place on June 27, 2015 in São Paulo, Brazil. However, on May 15, the event was moved to the Seminole Hard Rock Hotel and Casino in Hollywood, Florida. It was expected to be the first time an Ultimate Fighter Brazil Finale would take place outside of Brazil. However, as the event approached, several international fighters experienced potential travel restrictions due to technical issues within the Bureau of Consular Affairs division of the U.S. State Department which produces visas. This led to a situation in which several participants might have been barred from being able to compete. Subsequently, the divisional finals of The Ultimate Fighter: Brazil 4 were shifted to this event.

The event featured a potential UFC Women's Strawweight Championship title eliminator bout between Cláudia Gadelha and former WSOF Women's Strawweight champion Jessica Aguilar.

The event fared well, receiving 900,000 pay-per-view buys.

Rousey dedicated her fight to "Rowdy" Roddy Piper who had died the day before.

== Results ==
Main Card
Weight class				Method	Round	Time	Notes
Women's Bantamweight	Ronda Rousey (c)	def.	Bethe Correia	KO (punch)	1	0:34	(Note: For the UFC Women's Bantamweight Championship.)
Light Heavyweight	Maurício Rua	def.	Antônio Rogério Nogueira	Decision (unanimous) (29–28, 29–28, 29–28)	3	5:00
Lightweight	Glaico França	def.	Fernando Bruno	Submission (rear-naked choke)	3	4:46	(Note: The Ultimate Fighter: Brazil 4 Lightweight Final.)
Bantamweight	Reginaldo Vieira	def.	Dileno Lopes	Decision (unanimous) (29–28, 30–27, 30–27)	3	5:00	(Note: The Ultimate Fighter: Brazil 4 Bantamweight Final.)
Heavyweight	Stefan Struve	def.	Antônio Rodrigo Nogueira	Decision (unanimous) (30–27, 30–27, 30–27)	3	5:00
Heavyweight	Antônio Silva	def.	Soa Palelei	TKO (punches)	2	0:41
Women's Strawweight	Cláudia Gadelha	def.	Jessica Aguilar	Decision (unanimous) (30–27, 30–27, 30–27)	3	5:00	(Note: UFC Women's Strawweight Championship title eliminator.)
Preliminary Card (Fox Sports 1)
Welterweight	Demian Maia	def.	Neil Magny	Submission (rear-naked choke)	2	2:52
Light Heavyweight	Patrick Cummins	def.	Rafael Cavalcante	TKO (elbows)	3	0:45
Welterweight	Warlley Alves	def.	Nordine Taleb	Submission (guillotine choke)	2	4:11
Bantamweight	Iuri Alcântara	def.	Leandro Issa	Decision (unanimous) (29–28, 29–28, 29–27)	3	5:00
Preliminary Card (UFC Fight Pass)
Middleweight	Vitor Miranda	def.	Clint Hester	TKO (punches and elbows)	2	2:38
Bantamweight	Guido Cannetti	def.	Hugo Viana	Decision (unanimous) (29–28, 29–28, 29–28)	3	5:00

== Bonus awards ==
The following fighters were awarded $50,000 bonuses:

- Fight of the Night: Maurício Rua vs. Antônio Rogério Nogueria
- Performance of the Night: Ronda Rousey and Demian Maia

== See also ==
- List of UFC events
- 2015 in UFC
