= 2024 Russian National Freestyle Wrestling Championships =

2024 Russian Nationals
- Host city: Novoivanovskoye, Moscow oblast, Russia
- Dates: April 30 — May 4
- Stadium: Live arena

Champions
- Freestyle: Dagestan

The Men's and women's Russian National Freestyle Wrestling Championships 2024 (also known as the Russian Nationals 2024) was held in Novoivanovskoye, Moscow oblast by the Russian Wrestling Federation at the Live arena between 30 April to 4 May 2024.

== Men's freestyle ==
Event	Gold	Silver	Bronze
57 kg	(Dagestan) Akhmed Idrisov	(Sakha Republic) Lev Pavlov	(Dagestan) Musa Mekhtikhanov
57 kg	(Dagestan) Akhmed Idrisov	(Sakha Republic) Lev Pavlov	(Stavropol Krai) Ramiz Gamzatov
61 kg	(Dagestan) Zaur Uguev	(Dagestan) Bashir Magomedov	(Sakha Republic) Viktor Yakovlev
61 kg	(Dagestan) Zaur Uguev	(Dagestan) Bashir Magomedov	(North Ossetia–Alania) Artem Gobaev
65 kg	(Moscow) Shamil Mamedov	(Dagestan) Abasgadzhi Magomedov	(Dagestan) Zagir Shakhiev
65 kg	(Moscow) Shamil Mamedov	(Dagestan) Abasgadzhi Magomedov	(Dagestan) Ibragim Ibragimov
70 kg	(Moscow Oblast) Inalbek Sheriev	(Dagestan) Kurban Shiraev	(Chechnya) Magomed-Emi Eltemirov
70 kg	(Moscow Oblast) Inalbek Sheriev	(Dagestan) Kurban Shiraev	(Chechnya) Turpal-Ali Khatuev
74 kg	(Republic of Crimea (Russia)) Anzor Zakuev	(Dagestan) Magoma Dibirgadzhiev	(Dagestan) Kamil Abdullvagabov
74 kg	(Republic of Crimea (Russia)) Anzor Zakuev	(Dagestan) Magoma Dibirgadzhiev	(Dagestan) Imam Ganishov
79 kg	(Dagestan) Magomed Magomaev	(Bryansk Oblast) Gadzhimuarad Alikhmaev	(Kaliningrad Oblast) Akhmed Manilov
79 kg	(Dagestan) Magomed Magomaev	(Bryansk Oblast) Gadzhimuarad Alikhmaev	(Chechnya) Khalid Yakhiev
86 kg	(Dagestan) Ibragim Kadiev	(Kabardino-Balkaria) Malik Shavaev	(Dagestan) Akhmed Usmanov
86 kg	(Dagestan) Ibragim Kadiev	(Kabardino-Balkaria) Malik Shavaev	(Dagestan) Mukhamed Takhir Khaniev
92 kg	(Khanty-Mansi Autonomous Okrug) Alan Bagaev	(Dagestan) Askhab Saadullaev	(Kemerovo Oblast) Konstantin Pshenichnikov
92 kg	(Khanty-Mansi Autonomous Okrug) Alan Bagaev	(Dagestan) Askhab Saadullaev	(Moscow) Gadzhimagomed Nazhmudinov
97 kg	(Dagestan) Abdulrashid Sadulaev	(Dagestan) Alikhan Zhabrailov	(Krasnoyarsk Krai) Igor Ovsyannikov
97 kg	(Dagestan) Abdulrashid Sadulaev	(Dagestan) Alikhan Zhabrailov	(Tuva) Bady-Maadyr Samdan
125 kg	(Krasnodar Krai) Abdulla Kurbanov	(Dagestan) Shamil Musaev	(Krasnodar Krai) Artiom Pukhovsky
125 kg	(Krasnodar Krai) Abdulla Kurbanov	(Dagestan) Shamil Musaev	(Saint Petersburg) Zelimkhan Khizriev

== Women's freestyle ==
Event	Gold	Silver	Bronze
50 kg	(Nizhny Novgorod Oblast) Nadezhda Sokolova	(Dagestan) Elizaveta Smirnova	(Khakassia) Nataliya Pudova
50 kg	(Nizhny Novgorod Oblast) Nadezhda Sokolova	(Dagestan) Elizaveta Smirnova	(Kemerovo Oblast) Mariya Tyumerekova
53 kg	(Khakassia) Natalia Malysheva	(Dagestan) Milana Dadasheva	(Saint Petersburg) Anzhelika Vetoshkina
53 kg	(Khakassia) Natalia Malysheva	(Dagestan) Milana Dadasheva	(Krasnoyarsk Krai) Daria Khvostova
55 kg	(Krasnodar Krai) Aleksandra Skirenko	(Dagestan) Ekaterina Verbina	(Krasnoyarsk Krai) Ekaterina Isakova
55 kg	(Krasnodar Krai) Aleksandra Skirenko	(Dagestan) Ekaterina Verbina	(Krasnodar Krai) Ekaterina Poleshchuk
57 kg	(Krasnoyarsk Krai) Olga Khoroshavtseva	(Rostov Oblast) Marina Simonyan	(Stavropol) Kristina Mikhneva
57 kg	(Krasnoyarsk Krai) Olga Khoroshavtseva	(Rostov Oblast) Marina Simonyan	(Chuvashia) Veronika Chumikova
59 kg	(Kemerovo Oblast) Anastasiia Sidelnikova	(Tatarstan) Svetlana Lipatova	(Sakha Republic) Yevgenia Ogorodnikova
59 kg	(Kemerovo Oblast) Anastasiia Sidelnikova	(Tatarstan) Svetlana Lipatova	(Buryatia) Uliana Tukurenova
62 kg	(Tatarstan) Ekaterina Koshkina	(Republic of Crimea (Russia)) Amina Tandelova	(Buryatia) Anna Shcherbakova
62 kg	(Tatarstan) Ekaterina Koshkina	(Republic of Crimea (Russia)) Amina Tandelova	(Moscow) Inna Trazhukova
65 kg	(Buryatia) Valeria Dondupova	(Moscow) Zlatoslava Stepeanova	(Krasnoyarsk Krai) Dinara Kudaeva
65 kg	(Buryatia) Valeria Dondupova	(Moscow) Zlatoslava Stepeanova	(Krasnodar Krai) Kristina Eremina
68 kg	(Krasnoyarsk Krai) Khanum Velieva	(Moscow Oblast) Vusala Parfianovich	(Saint Petersburg) Elizaveta Petliakova
68 kg	(Krasnoyarsk Krai) Khanum Velieva	(Moscow Oblast) Vusala Parfianovich	(Dagestan) Kseniia Burakova
72 kg	(Saint Petersburg) Olesia Bezuglova	(Moscow) Albina Rusina	(Krasnodar Krai) Kristina Bratchikova
72 kg	(Saint Petersburg) Olesia Bezuglova	(Moscow) Albina Rusina	(Bryansk Oblast) Svetlana Babushkina
76 kg	(Krasnoyarsk Krai) Kristina Shumova	(Moscow) Rita Talismanova	(Krasnodar Krai) Maria Silina
76 kg	(Krasnoyarsk Krai) Kristina Shumova	(Moscow) Rita Talismanova	(Moscow Oblast) Ekaterina Bukina

== See also ==
- 2023 Russian National Freestyle Wrestling Championships
- 2022 Russian National Freestyle Wrestling Championships
- 2021 Russian National Freestyle Wrestling Championships
- 2020 Russian National Freestyle Wrestling Championships
- 2019 Russian National Freestyle Wrestling Championships
- 2018 Russian National Freestyle Wrestling Championships
- 2017 Russian National Freestyle Wrestling Championships
- Soviet and Russian results in men's freestyle wrestling
