= David Baev =

Russian wrestler (born 1997)

David Baev Давид Баев
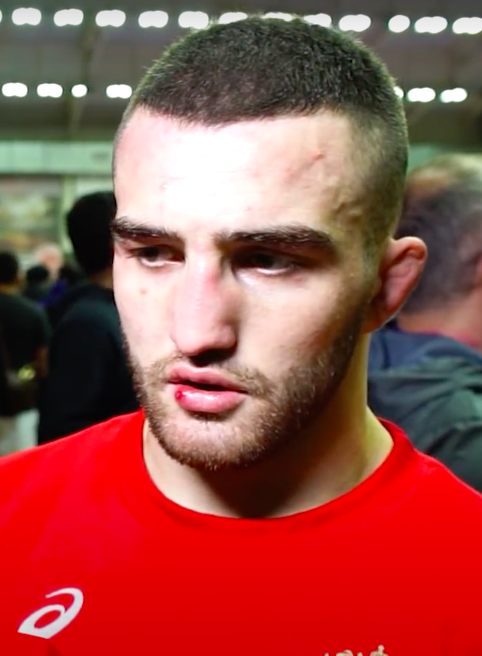
- Baev at the 2020 Russian Nationals

Personal information
- Native name: Давид Альбертович Баев
- Full name: David Albertovich Baev
- Nationality: (Russia) Russian
- Born: November 7, 1997 (age 28) Vladikavkaz, North Ossetia-Alania, Russia
- Height: 172 cm (5 ft 8 in)

Sport
- Country: Russia
- Sport: Wrestling
- Weight class: 70-74 kg
- Rank: Master of Sports of Russia in freestyle wrestling
- Event: Freestyle
- Club: Aslan Khadartsev's Academy
- Coached by: M. Tsakaev, M. Rozhkov, A. Khadartsev

Achievements and titles
- World finals: (gold) (2019)
- Regional finals: (gold) (2025)
Medal record
Men's freestyle wrestling
Representing Russia
World Championships
Gold medal – first place	2019 Nur-Sultan	70 kg
World Cup
Gold medal – first place	2019 Yakutsk	Team
World U23 Championships
Silver medal – second place	2018 Bucharest	70 kg
World Juniors Championships
Gold medal – first place	2017 Tampere	66 kg
European Juniors Championships
Gold medal – first place	2016 Bucharest	66 kg
World Cadets Championships
Gold medal – first place	2014 Snina	58 kg
Representing United World Wrestling
European Championships
Gold medal – first place	2025 Bratislava	70 kg
Representing (North Ossetia–Alania) North Ossetia
All-Russian Spartakiad
Silver medal – second place	2022 Kazan	74 kg
Russian National Championships
Gold medal – first place	2019 Sochi	70 kg
Silver medal – second place	2020 Naro-Fominsk	70 kg
Bronze medal – third place	2022 Kyzyl	74 kg
Bronze medal – third place	2018 Odintsovo	70 kg
Bronze medal – third place	2017 Nazran	70 kg
Golden Grand Prix Ivan Yarygin
Silver medal – second place	2020 Krasnoyarsk	70 kg
Bronze medal – third place	2021 Krasnoyarsk	70 kg
Bronze medal – third place	2023 Krasnoyarsk	74 kg
Silver medal – second place	2024 Krasnoyarsk	74 kg
Gold medal – first place	2025 Krasnoyarsk	70 kg

David Albertovich Baev (Russian: Баев Давид Альбертович, Iron Ossetic: Байаты Алберты фырт Давид; born November 7, 1997, in Vladikavkaz, North Ossetia-Alania) is a Russian freestyle wrestler of Ossetian descent who competes at 70 kilograms. In 2019, he claimed gold at the 2019 World Cup, the Russian National Championship and the World Championship.

== Wrestling career ==
Baev debuted at the 2017 Russian Championships in Nazran, Ingushetia; after losing to Magomed Dibirgadzhiev of Ivanovo Oblast in the semi-finals, he beat Karachay-Cherkassia's Alibek Akbaev by 6–4; Baev ultimately took third place. Baev also won the 2017 Junior World Championships in Tampere, Finland, after beating Rayan Deakin of the United States by technical fall (10-0). Baev once again won bronze in 2018 Nationals in Odintsovo. David Baev has two younger brothers.

=== 2019 Russian National Championships ===
In the 2019's edition of the Russian National Championships held in Sochi, Baev became champion in the 70 kg weight class. In the round of 16, Baev faced Krasnodar representative, Ismail Dzhapua, and won by technical superiority by 10–0, without conceding a single point. Baev then faced Krasnoyarsk's Semen Tereshenko who he won by 5-0 points. In the quarter-final, Baev faced former Ivan Yarygin gold medalist and two-time Russian national silver medalist, Israil Kasumov of Chechnya.

Baev won the quarter-final match with a technical fall by a score of 13–2, advancing to the semi-finals, where he defeated Evgeny Zherbaev of Buryatia by another technical fall with a 15–4 score. After an exhaustive-paced match, Baev defeated Razambek Zhamalov and was declared the winner by criteria with a score of 10*-10, for he scored with the highest-scoring technique of the match – a 4-point takedown in the first period, shortly after Baev was put on the shot-clock. With two-time World Champion Magomedrasul Gazimagomedov moving up to 74 kg, Baev won the right to represent Russia at the 2019 World Wrestling Championships held in Nur-Sultan, Kazakhstan.

=== 2019 World Championships ===
Baev competed in the 70 kg weight category and won his first senior World title. Baev first defeated Andrei Karpach of Belarus by a technical fall, 10–0. Then, Baev was matched against former World Champion, Zurabi Iakobishvili, who he defeated by a score of 7–0. Baev progressed to the quarter-finals where he faced Asian Champion and World and Olympic medalist Ikhtiyor Navruzov of Uzbekistan, who he also defeated, 11–5. Next, Baev faced World silver medalist and European Champion, Magomedmurad Gadzhiev. Baev was able to score two-points on a takedown, and another two-points on a re-attack, resulting to a score of 5–2.

In the final match against Nurkozha Kaipanov, Baev's opponent reversed and scored exposure for two-points. Baev did the same and added a gut-wrench, increasing to a score of 4–2. He then attacked with a four-point single leg and again got additional two-further-points from a trapped-arm gut-wrench. Going into the second period, Baev was up 10–2, and after thirty seconds, Baev again used his single leg to gain a further four-points in what resulted in a technical fall win, earning Baev the 2019 world title.

== Freestyle record ==
International Freestyle Matches
Res.	Record	Opponent	Score	Date	Event	Location
2021 Russian Nationals DNP at 65 kg
Loss	46–12	(Dagestan) Murshid Mutalimov	2–8	March 13–14, 2021	2021 Russian National Freestyle Wrestling Championships	Ulan-Ude, Russia
Win	46–11	(Russia) Akhmed Kasumov	TF 11–0	March 13–14, 2021	2021 Russian National Freestyle Wrestling Championships	Ulan-Ude, Russia
WLR Pro League I (silver) at 70 kg
Loss	45–11	(Uzbekistan) Ilyas Bekbulatov	4–6	January 25, 2021	WLR Pro League I	Russia
Win	45–10	(Russia) Inalbek Sheriev	9–5	January 25, 2021	WLR Pro League I	Russia
Win	44–10	(Russia) Kurban Shiraev	6–4	January 25, 2021	WLR Pro League I	Russia
2020 Russian Nationals (silver) at 70 kg
Loss	43–10	(North Ossetia–Alania) Chermen Valiev	2–4	October 16–18, 2020	2020 Russian National Freestyle Wrestling Championships	Naro-Fominsk, Russia
Win	43–9	(Tuva) Arbak Sat	8–3	October 16–18, 2020	2020 Russian National Freestyle Wrestling Championships	Naro-Fominsk, Russia
Win	42–9	(Dagestan) Kurban Shiraev	8–0	October 16–18, 2020	2020 Russian National Freestyle Wrestling Championships	Naro-Fominsk, Russia
Win	41–9	(Dagestan) Abdullagadzhi Magomedov	TF 11–0	October 16–18, 2020	2020 Russian National Freestyle Wrestling Championships	Naro-Fominsk, Russia
Win	40–9	(Dagestan) Imam Ganishov	5–3	October 16–18, 2020	2020 Russian National Freestyle Wrestling Championships	Naro-Fominsk, Russia
2020 Ivan Yarygin Golden Grand Prix (silver) at 70 kg
Loss	39–9	(Krasnoyarsk Krai) Israil Kasumov	5–6	January 23–26, 2020	Golden Grand Prix Ivan Yarygin 2020	Krasnoyarsk, Russia
Win	39–8	(Buryatia) Yevgeny Zherbaev	13–6	January 23–26, 2020	Golden Grand Prix Ivan Yarygin 2020	Krasnoyarsk, Russia
Win	38–8	(Tuva) Arbak Sat	Fall	January 23–26, 2020	Golden Grand Prix Ivan Yarygin 2020	Krasnoyarsk, Russia
Win	37–8	(Mongolia) Oyungerel Ganbayar	TF 10–0	January 23–26, 2020	Golden Grand Prix Ivan Yarygin 2020	Krasnoyarsk, Russia
2019 World Championships (gold) at 70 kg
Win	36–8	(Kazakhstan) Nurkozha Kaipanov	TF 14–2	September 19–20, 2019	2019 World Wrestling Championships	Nur-Sultan, Kazakhstan
Win	35–8	(Poland) Magomedmurad Gadzhiev	5–2	September 19–20, 2019	2019 World Wrestling Championships	Nur-Sultan, Kazakhstan
Win	34–8	(Uzbekistan) Ikhtiyor Navruzov	11–5	September 19–20, 2019	2019 World Wrestling Championships	Nur-Sultan, Kazakhstan
Win	33–8	(Georgia (country)) Zurabi Iakobishvili	7–0	September 19–20, 2019	2019 World Wrestling Championships	Nur-Sultan, Kazakhstan
Win	32–8	(Moldova) Mihai Sava	10–1	September 19–20, 2019	2019 World Wrestling Championships	Nur-Sultan, Kazakhstan
2019 Russian Nationals (gold) at 70 kg
Win	31–8	(Chechnya) Razambek Zhamalov	10–10	July 4, 2019	2019 Russian National Freestyle Wrestling Championships	Sochi, Russia
Win	30–8	(Buryatia) Yevgeny Zherbaev	TF 15–4	July 4, 2019	2019 Russian National Freestyle Wrestling Championships	Sochi, Russia
Win	29–8	(Krasnoyarsk) Israil Kasumov	TF 13–2	July 4, 2019	2019 Russian National Freestyle Wrestling Championships	Sochi, Russia
Win	28–8	(Krasnoyarsk) Semen Tereshchenko	5–0	July 4, 2019	2019 Russian National Freestyle Wrestling Championships	Sochi, Russia
Win	27–8	(Krasnodar) Ismail Dzhapua	TF 10–0	July 4, 2019	2019 Russian National Freestyle Wrestling Championships	Sochi, Russia
2019 Ali Aliev International 7th at 70 kg
Loss	26–8	(Russia) Chermen Valiev	5–6	May 1–3, 2019	2019 Ali Aliev International	Kaspiysk, Russia
Win	26–7	(Bulgaria) Ali-Pasha Umarpashaev	11–2	May 1–3, 2019	2019 Ali Aliev International	Kaspiysk, Russia
Win	25–7	(Moldova) Dmitrii Malencov	TF 10–0	May 1–3, 2019	2019 Ali Aliev International	Kaspiysk, Russia
2019 World Cup (gold) at 70 kg
Win	24–7	(Iran) Meisam Nassiri	6–1	March 16–17, 2019	2019 Wrestling World Cup - Men's freestyle	Yakutsk, Russia
Win	23–7	(Cuba) Franklin Marén	TF 10–0	March 16–17, 2019	2019 Wrestling World Cup - Men's freestyle	Yakutsk, Russia
2019 Ivan Yarygin Golden Grand Prix 5th at 70 kg
Loss	22–7	(Chechnya) Razambek Zhamalov	4–8	January 24, 2019	Golden Grand Prix Ivan Yarygin 2019	Krasnoyarsk, Russia
Loss	22–6	(Dagestan) Magomedrasul Gazimagomedov	2–2	January 24, 2019	Golden Grand Prix Ivan Yarygin 2019	Krasnoyarsk, Russia
Win	22–5	(United States) James Green	10–2	January 24, 2019	Golden Grand Prix Ivan Yarygin 2019	Krasnoyarsk, Russia
Win	21–5	(Mongolia) Temuulen Enkhtuya	TF 14–2	January 24, 2019	Golden Grand Prix Ivan Yarygin 2019	Krasnoyarsk, Russia
2018 Alans International (gold) at 70 kg
Win	20–5	(Russia) Magomed Kurbanaliev	5–3	December 7–9, 2018	2018 Alans International	Vladikavkaz, Russia
Win	19–5	(United States) James Green	8–6	December 7–9, 2018	2018 Alans International	Vladikavkaz, Russia
Win	18–5	(Russia) Alibek Akbaev	4–1	December 7–9, 2018	2018 Alans International	Vladikavkaz, Russia
Win	17–5	(United States) Josh Kindig	TF 14–4	December 7–9, 2018	2018 Alans International	Vladikavkaz, Russia
2018 U23 World Championships (silver) at 70 kg
Loss	16–5	(Slovakia) Tajmuraz Salkazanov	1–9	November 12–18, 2018	2018 U23 World Wrestling Championships	Bucharest, Romania
Win	16–4	(Turkey) Enes Uslu	7–6	November 12–18, 2018	2018 U23 World Wrestling Championships	Bucharest, Romania
Win	15–4	(Uzbekistan) Ramazan İbadov	TF 10–0	November 12–18, 2018	2018 U23 World Wrestling Championships	Bucharest, Romania
Win	14–4	(United States) Hayden Hidlay	6–5	November 12–18, 2018	2018 U23 World Wrestling Championships	Bucharest, Romania
Win	13–4	(Kazakhstan) Aidyn Tazhigali	TF 10–0	November 12–18, 2018	2018 U23 World Wrestling Championships	Bucharest, Romania
2018 Alexandr Medved Prizes (gold) at 70 kg
Win	12–4	(Azerbaijan) Aghahuseyn Mustafayev	TF 10–0	September 12–14, 2018	2018 Alexandr Medved Prizes	Minsk, Belarus
Win	11–4	(Ukraine) Andriy Kviatkovskyi	3–0	September 12–14, 2018	2018 Alexandr Medved Prizes	Minsk, Belarus
Win	10–4	(Kyrgyzstan) Islambek Orozbekov	TF 10–0	September 12–14, 2018	2018 Alexandr Medved Prizes	Minsk, Belarus
Win	9–4	(Ukraine) Aleksey Boruta	TF 12–0	September 12–14, 2018	2018 Alexandr Medved Prizes	Minsk, Belarus
2018 Russian Nationals (bronze) at 70 kg
Win	8–4	(Dagestan) Razambek Zhamalov	4–3	August 3–5, 2018	2018 Russian National Freestyle Wrestling Championships	Odintsovo, Russia
Loss	7–4	(Dagestan) Magomedrasul Gazimagomedov	3–6	August 3–5, 2018	2018 Russian National Freestyle Wrestling Championships	Odintsovo, Russia
2017 Akhmat Kadyrov Cup (silver) as Team RUS at 70 kg
Loss	7–3	(Russia) Israil Kasumov	TF 0–11	October 7, 2017	2017 Akhmat Kadyrov Cup	Grozny, Russia
Win	7–2	(Europe) Murad Kuramagomedov	TF 11-0	October 7, 2017	2017 Akhmat Kadyrov Cup	Grozny, Russia
2017 Russian Nationals (bronze) at 65 kg
Win	6–2	(Karachay-Cherkessia) Alibek Akbaev	6–4	June 12, 2017	2017 Russian National Freestyle Wrestling Championships	Nazran, Russia
Loss	5–2	(Ivanovo Oblast) Magomed Dibirgadzhiev	13–17	June 12, 2017	2017 Russian National Freestyle Wrestling Championships	Nazran, Russia
Win	5–1	(Dagestan) Magomed Kurbanaliev	10–10	June 12, 2017	2017 Russian National Freestyle Wrestling Championships	Nazran, Russia
Win	4–1	(North Ossetia–Alania) Zaur Tokaev	4–2	June 12, 2017	2017 Russian National Freestyle Wrestling Championships	Nazran, Russia
Win	3–1	(Voronezh Oblast) Dmitiy Merenkov	7–2	June 12, 2017	2017 Russian National Freestyle Wrestling Championships	Nazran, Russia
2017 Ivan Yarygin Golden Grand Prix 8th at 65 kg
Loss	2–1	(Russia) Alan Gogaev	2–6	January 27–29, 2017	Golden Grand Prix Ivan Yarygin 2017	Krasnoyarsk, Russia
Win	2–0	(Russia) Shikhsaid Dzhalilov	TF 10–0	January 27–29, 2017	Golden Grand Prix Ivan Yarygin 2017	Krasnoyarsk, Russia
Win	1–0	(Russia) Magomed Magomedov	TF 11–0	January 27–29, 2017	Golden Grand Prix Ivan Yarygin 2017	Krasnoyarsk, Russia
