= Razambek Zhamalov =

Russian-Uzbekistani sport wrestler (born 1998)

Razambek Zhamalov Разамбек Жамалов
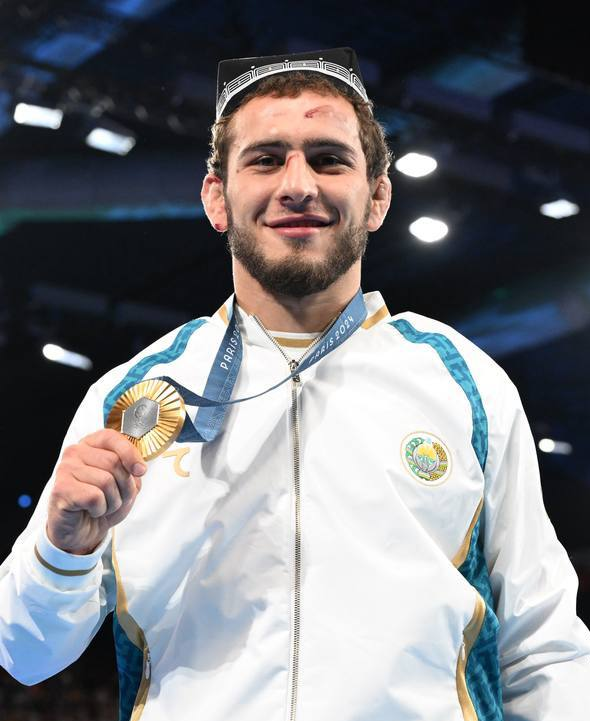
- Zhamalov at the 2024 Summer Olympics

Personal information
- Native name: Разамбек Саламбекович Жамалов
- Full name: Razambek Salambekovich Zhamalov
- Born: 1 July 1998 (age 28) Petrakovskoye, Dagestan, Russia
- Height: 5 ft 7 in (170 cm)

Sport
- Country: Russia (2016–2024); Uzbekistan (2024–present)
- Sport: Wrestling
- Weight class: 74 kg
- Rank: International Master of Sport in freestyle wrestling
- Event: Freestyle
- Club: Saitiev Wrestling School
- Coached by: Adam Saitiev; Musa Saydulbatalov

Achievements and titles
- Regional finals: 5th (2021)
Medal record
Men's freestyle wrestling
Representing Uzbekistan
Olympic Games
Gold medal – first place	2024 Paris	74 kg
Grand Prix
Gold medal – first place	2024 Budapest	74 kg
Gold medal – first place	2024 Namangan	74 kg
Representing Russia
Individual World Cup
Gold medal – first place	2020 Belgrade	74 kg
U23 World Championships
Gold medal – first place	2019 Budapest	74 kg
U23 European Championships
Gold medal – first place	2019 Novi Sad	70 kg
U20 World Championships
Silver medal – second place	2018 Trnava	70 kg
Representing Dagestan
Russian National Championships
Gold medal – first place	2022 Kyzyl	74 kg
Gold medal – first place	2020 Naro-Fominsk	74 kg
Silver medal – second place	2021 Ulan-Ude	74 kg
Silver medal – second place	2019 Sochi	70 kg
Grand Prix
Silver medal – second place	2020 Krasnoyarsk	74 kg
Gold medal – first place	2019 Kaspisk	70 kg
Bronze medal – third place	2019 Krasnoyarsk	70 kg
Bronze medal – third place	2018 Vladikavkas	70 kg
Gold medal – first place	2018 Grozny	Team
Gold medal – first place	2018 Khasavyurt	70 kg

Razambek Salambekovich Zhamalov (Russian: Разамбек Саламбекович Жамалов; born 1 July 1998) is a Chechen-born Uzbek freestyle wrestler who competes at 74 kilograms. The 2020 Individual World Cup winner and 2019 U23 World champion, Zhamalov claimed the gold medal at the 2024 Summer Olympics, representing Uzbekistan. He was also a two-time Russian National champion and four-time finalist before transferring to Uzbekistan.

== Background ==
Zhamalov was born in a small village called Petrakovskoye in the Khasavyurtovsky District of Dagestan. Coached by Adam Saitiev and Musa Saydulbatalov at the Saitiev Wrestling Academy, Zhamalov used to represent Dagestan and Chechnya in the national circuit.

== Career ==
=== 2016–2018 ===
Zhamalov made his senior freestyle debut the same day he became eligible to, as he turned 18 in July 2016, at the Ali Aliev Memorial, where he placed tenth after going 1–1. On November, he claimed the Intercontinental Cup, with a notable win over defending two-time Asian Champion Daulet Niyazbekov in the finals.

In January 2017, he placed ninth at the Golden Grand Prix Ivan Yarygin. On March, he moved up from 61 kg to 66 kg, claimed the Roman Dmitriev Memorial championship and was named the Outstanding Wrestler, after defeating four opponents by the same score of 10–0. On September, he placed eight at the Alexandr Medved Prizes. To close off the year, Zhamalov claimed the Stepan Sargsyan Cup on Armenia in October.

In 2018, he started off by moving up from 65 kg to 70 kg, and on March, he became a two-time Roman Dmitriev Memorial champion. After qualifying via U20 tournaments, Zhamalov wrestled at the Russian Nationals of August, where after recording an 8–1 victory, he was defeated in a closely contested 1–2 match against '15 World Champion and eventual '18 World Champion Magomedrasul Gazimagomedov, and then was again defeated by two-time age-group World Champion David Baev in a last-second come-from-behind loss. After a runner-up finish at the U20 World Championships, Zhamalov became a two-time Intercontinental Cup champion, when he defeated the returning champion of the tournament and '10 Military World Champion Aghahuseyn Mustafayev in the finale. He then represented Russia at the Akhmat Kadyrov Cup, where he compiled three five-pointers and one four-pointer for the team. On December, he placed third at the Alans International Tournament, with a lone and close loss to '16 World Champion Magomed Kurbanaliev.

=== 2019 ===
To start off the year, Zhamalov competed at the Golden Grand Prix Ivan Yarygin of January, where he earned a bronze medal after a loss to returning World Champion Magomedrasul Gazimagomedov and wins over '18 US Open National Champion Jason Chamberlain and two-time age-group World Champion David Baev, the latter becoming the most notable match in the tournament. In March, he became the U23 European Champion at age 20, and in May, he claimed the Ali Aliev Memorial title. On July, he competed at the Russian Nationals, where he made the finals by downing '17 Russian National champion Magomedkhabib Kadimagomedov and '18 Junior European Champion Chermen Valiev, before being defeated by rival David Baev in another epic match, to claim the silver medal. After losing the chance to represent Russia at the World Championships, Zhamalov bumped up to an Olympic weight class (from 70 kg to 74 kg) and went on to win the U23 All-Russia Open Tournament with a win over '18 U23 World Championship medalist Timur Bizhoev in the finals, on September, becoming the 2019 U23 Russian World Teamer. Aged 21, he became the U23 World Champion with five decision victories at the U23 World Championships.

=== 2020 ===
To start off January, Zhamalov got a series of victories over high level opponents at the Golden Grand Prix Ivan Yarygin, such as '19 European Championship medalist Timur Bizhoev, '19 World Championship runner-up and '19 Asian Champion Nurkozha Kaipanov, and '16 World Champion Magomed Kurbanaliev, before being defeated in the finals by two-time World Champion Magomedrasul Gazimagomedov, to claim the silver medal. After being unable to compete for months due to the COVID-19 pandemic, Zhamalov came back on October to claim the Russian National Championship, when he defeated '14 World Champion Khetag Tsabolov in the finals.

After his championship showdown at the Russian Nationals, Zhamalov was selected as the Russian representative for the Individual World Cup of December (replacement for the World Championships). At the tournament, he compiled a combined score of 21–0 against three opponents to reach the finals, where he faced the accomplished two-time World Champion Frank Chamizo, whom he was able to edge with a comeback win in the last seconds of the match with a two-point takedown, to become the champion of the biggest tournament of his career.

=== 2021 ===
Zhamalov competed at the Russian National Championships on March, where after dominating '19 International Cup runner-up Magomed Dibirgadzhiev and '16 University World Champion Nabirbek Khizriev, he avenged his last loss from the Golden Grand Prix Ivan Yarygin 2020 to two–time World Champion Magomedrasul Gazimagomedov by points to make the finals. In the finale, he wrestled two-time and reigning World Champion Zaurbek Sidakov, whom he lost to in a close 2–3 match, giving up the 2021 RU Olympic Team Spot.

In April, Zhamalov competed at the European Championships, and after racking up a notable win over Semen Radulov, he was defeated by 2018 U23 World Champion Tajmuraz Salkazanov and two–time World Champion Frank Chamizo, placing fifth. During the tournament, Zhamalov suffered a serious injury that required surgery and months of rest, leaving him out for the year.

=== 2022–2023 ===
After more than a year without competing, Zhamalov came back to the mat on May 19 at the prestigious Poddubny Wrestling League, where he reached the semifinals before losing to rival David Baev. He came back to pick up a bronze medal. A month later, Zhamalov competed at the Russian National Championships from June 24 to 26, where he reached the crown over a deep bracket with a revenge win over Baev in the semifinals and a win over fellow U23 World Champion and Russian National champion Chermen Valiev in the finale.

To close off the year, he became the All-Russian Spartakiad champion, with a notable win over David Baev in August.

After months of no competition, he defeated Ilyas Bekbulatov by fall at the Poddubny Wrestling League 4 in his first and only tournament of 2023.

=== 2024 ===
On January, Zhamalov changed his sports citizenship and transferred to the country of Uzbekistan. On February, he competed at the Uzbek Botirlari Grand Prix, wearing the Uzbek singlet for the first time in his career. He made his way to a gold medal with four victories over fellow Uzbek athletes.

In June, he cruised through the field at the Polyák Imre & Varga János Ranking Series to earn a gold medal with four consecutive victories. Zhamalov placed higher than fellow Uzbek Bekzod Abdurakhmonov, who placed fifth and had qualified the weight for Uzbekistan at the Summer Olympics, earning the right to compete at the 2024 Summer Olympics.

In August, Zhamalov made his Olympic debut at the 2024 Summer Olympics in Paris. On the first day, he earned four straight victories over fellow Russian-born wrestlers, defeating returning Olympic silver medalist Magomedkhabib Kadimagomedov, four-time European champion Tajmuraz Salkazanov from Slovakia, U23 World champion Chermen Valiev from Albania and University World champion Viktor Rassadin from Tajikistan, to advance to the finals and secure a medal. The next day, Zhamalov pinned World medalist Daichi Takatani from Japan to earn the gold medal and become the Olympic champion. On 22 August, the Minister of Physical Culture and Sports of the Chechnya Akhmat Kadyrov presented apartments to natives of the republic, the winner and bronze medalist of the Paris Olympics Razambek Zhamalov and Islam Dudaev.

=== 2026 ===
Zhamalov signed with Real American Freestyle (RAF) in June 2026.

== Freestyle record ==
Senior Freestyle Matches
Res.	Record	Opponent	Score	Date	Event	Location
2024 Summer Olympics (gold) at 74 kg
Win	98–13	(Japan) Daichi Takatani	Fall	August 10, 2024	2024 Summer Olympics	Paris, France
Win	97–13	(Tajikistan) Viktor Rassadin	8–2	August 9, 2024	2024 Summer Olympics	Paris, France
Win	96–13	(Albania) Chermen Valiev	6–5	August 9, 2024	2024 Summer Olympics	Paris, France
Win	95–13	(Slovakia) Tajmuraz Salkazanov	11–3	August 9, 2024	2024 Summer Olympics	Paris, France
Win	94–13	(Belarus) Magomedkhabib Kadimagomedov	8–0	August 9, 2024	2024 Summer Olympics	Paris, France
2024 Polyák Imre & Varga János Ranking Series (gold) at 74 kg
Win	93–13	(Hungary) Murad Kuramagomedov	7–4	June 6, 2024	2024 Polyák Imre & Varga János Memorial Tournament	Budapest, Hungary
Win	92–13	(Iran) Ali Rezaei	Fall	June 6, 2024	2024 Polyák Imre & Varga János Memorial Tournament	Budapest, Hungary
Win	91–13	(Georgia (country)) Giorgi Elbakidze	5–3	June 6, 2024	2024 Polyák Imre & Varga János Memorial Tournament	Budapest, Hungary
Win	90–13	(Venezuela) Anthony Montero	5–0	June 6, 2024	2024 Polyák Imre & Varga János Memorial Tournament	Budapest, Hungary
2024 Uzbek Botirlari Grand Prix (gold) at 74 kg
Win	89–13	(Uzbekistan) Asomiddin Hasanov	TF 12–1	February 27, 2024	2024 Uzbek Botirlari Grand Prix	Namangan, Uzbekistan
Win	88–13	(Uzbekistan) Begijon Kuldashev	TF 10–0	February 27, 2024	2024 Uzbek Botirlari Grand Prix	Namangan, Uzbekistan
Win	87–13	(Uzbekistan) Daler Cho'liboyev	11–3	February 27, 2024	2024 Uzbek Botirlari Grand Prix	Namangan, Uzbekistan
Win	86–13	(Uzbekistan) Fazliddin Nasriddinov	TF 10–0	February 27, 2024	2024 Uzbek Botirlari Grand Prix	Namangan, Uzbekistan
Win	85–13	(Uzbekistan) Ilyas Bekbulatov	Fall	April 26, 2023	Poddubny Wrestling League 4	Almaty, Kazakhstan
2022 All-Russian Spartakiad (gold) at 74 kg
Win	84–13	(Russia) David Baev	9–1	August 19–26, 2022	2022 All-Russian Spartakiad of the Strongest	Kazan, Russia
Win	83–13	(Russia) Robert Dzukaev	TF 10–0	August 19–26, 2022	2022 All-Russian Spartakiad of the Strongest	Kazan, Russia
Win	82–13	(Russia) Artem Umarov	TF 10–0	August 19–26, 2022	2022 All-Russian Spartakiad of the Strongest	Kazan, Russia
2022 Russian Nationals (gold) at 74 kg
Win	81–13	(Russia) Chermen Valiev	3–2	June 24–26, 2022	2022 Russian National Championships	Kyzyl, Russia
Win	80–13	(Russia) David Baev	9–3	June 24–26, 2022	2022 Russian National Championships	Kyzyl, Russia
Win	79–13	(Russia) Semen Tereshchenko	9–2	June 24–26, 2022	2022 Russian National Championships	Kyzyl, Russia
Win	78–13	(Russia) Tumen Bodiev	TF 10–0	June 24–26, 2022	2022 Russian National Championships	Kyzyl, Russia
2022 Ivan Poddubny League (bronze) at 74 kg
Win	77–13	(Russia) Albik Petrosyan	TF 10–0	May 19–20, 2022	2022 Ivan Poddubny Wrestling League	Moscow, Russia
Loss	76–13	(Russia) David Baev	5–6	May 19–20, 2022	2022 Ivan Poddubny Wrestling League	Moscow, Russia
Win	76–12	(Russia) Tazhi Davudov	TF 10–0	May 19–20, 2022	2022 Ivan Poddubny Wrestling League	Moscow, Russia
2021 European Championships 5th at 74 kg
Loss	75–12	(Italy) Frank Chamizo	1–5	April 19–21, 2021	2021 European Continental Championships	Warsaw, Poland
Loss	75–11	(Slovakia) Tajmuraz Salkazanov	5–6	April 19–21, 2021	2021 European Continental Championships	Warsaw, Poland
Win	75–10	(Ukraine) Semen Radulov	TF 11–1	April 19–21, 2021	2021 European Continental Championships	Warsaw, Poland
Win	74–10	(Armenia) Hrayr Alikhanyan	TF 10–0	April 19–21, 2021	2021 European Continental Championships	Warsaw, Poland
2021 Russian Nationals (silver) at 74 kg
Loss	73–10	(North Ossetia–Alania) Zaurbek Sidakov	2–3	March 11–12, 2021	2021 Russian National Championships	Ulan-Ude, Russia
Win	73–9	(Dagestan) Magomedrasul Gazimagomedov	2–1	March 11–12, 2021	2021 Russian National Championships	Ulan-Ude, Russia
Win	72–9	(Krasnoyarsk Krai) Nadirbek Khizriev	Fall	March 11–12, 2021	2021 Russian National Championships	Ulan-Ude, Russia
Win	71–9	(Dagestan) Magomed Dibirgadzhiev	TF 10–0	March 11–12, 2021	2021 Russian National Championships	Ulan-Ude, Russia
2020 Individual World Cup (gold) at 74 kg
Win	70–9	(Italy) Frank Chamizo	4–2	December 16–18, 2020	2020 Individual World Cup	Belgrade, Serbia
Win	69–9	(Slovakia) Tajmuraz Salkazanov	5–0	December 16–18, 2020	2020 Individual World Cup	Belgrade, Serbia
Win	68–9	(Hungary) Murad Kuramagomedov	6–0	December 16–18, 2020	2020 Individual World Cup	Belgrade, Serbia
Win	67–9	(Israel) Mitch Finesilver	TF 10–0	December 16–18, 2020	2020 Individual World Cup	Belgrade, Serbia
2020 Russian Nationals (gold) at 74 kg
Win	66–9	(North Ossetia–Alania) Khetag Tsabolov	5–1	October 16–18, 2020	2020 Russian National Championships	Naro-Fominsk, Russia
Win	65–9	(Russia) Timur Bizhoev	6–6	October 16–18, 2020	2020 Russian National Championships	Naro-Fominsk, Russia
Win	64–9	(Russia) Magomedmurad Dadaev	TF 11–0	October 16–18, 2020	2020 Russian National Championships	Naro-Fominsk, Russia
Win	63–9	(Russia) Saipulla Alibolatov	TF 13–2	October 16–18, 2020	2020 Russian National Championships	Naro-Fominsk, Russia
Win	62–9	(Russia) Nikita Suchkov	7–2	October 16–18, 2020	2020 Russian National Championships	Naro-Fominsk, Russia
2020 Ivan Yarygin Golden Grand Prix (silver) at 74 kg
Loss	61–9	(Russia) Magomedrasul Gazimagomedov	1–3	January 23–26, 2020	Golden Grand Prix Ivan Yarygin 2020	Krasnoyarsk, Russia
Win	61–8	(Russia) Magomed Kurbanaliev	8–0	January 23–26, 2020	Golden Grand Prix Ivan Yarygin 2020	Krasnoyarsk, Russia
Win	60–8	(Kazakhstan) Nurkozha Kaipanov	8–7	January 23–26, 2020	Golden Grand Prix Ivan Yarygin 2020	Krasnoyarsk, Russia
Win	59–8	(Russia) Timur Bizhoev	4–0	January 23–26, 2020	Golden Grand Prix Ivan Yarygin 2020	Krasnoyarsk, Russia
Win	58–8	(Russia) Magomed Khizriev	7–2	January 23–26, 2020	Golden Grand Prix Ivan Yarygin 2020	Krasnoyarsk, Russia
2019 U23 World Championships (gold) at 74 kg
Win	57–8	(Iran) Mohammad Nokhodi	8–1	October 29–30, 2019	2019 U23 World Championships	Budapest, Hungary
Win	56–8	(Georgia (country)) Giorgi Sulava	15–7	October 29–30, 2019	2019 U23 World Championships	Budapest, Hungary
Win	55–8	(Turkey) Fazlı Eryılmaz	10–2	October 29–30, 2019	2019 U23 World Championships	Budapest, Hungary
Win	54–8	(India) Gourav Baliyan	12–9	October 29–30, 2019	2019 U23 World Championships	Budapest, Hungary
Win	53–8	(United States) Brady Berge	5–1	October 29–30, 2019	2019 U23 World Championships	Budapest, Hungary
2019 U23 All–Russian Yuri Gusov Memorial (gold) at 74 kg
Win	52–8	(Kabardino-Balkaria) Timur Bizhoev	4–2	September 27–28, 2019	2019 U23 All–Russian Yuri Gusov Memorial	Vladikavkaz, Russia
Win	51–8	(Krasnoyarsk) Nikita Suchkov	TF 13–2	September 27–28, 2019	2019 U23 All–Russian Yuri Gusov Memorial	Vladikavkaz, Russia
Win	50–8	(North Ossetia–Alania) Tazret Tuskaev	TF 11–0	September 27–28, 2019	2019 U23 All–Russian Yuri Gusov Memorial	Vladikavkaz, Russia
Win	49–8	(Kazakhstan) Alimbek Aydinov	TF 10–0	September 27–28, 2019	2019 U23 All–Russian Yuri Gusov Memorial	Vladikavkaz, Russia
Win	48–8	(North Ossetia–Alania) Soslan Kaloev	TF 10–0	September 27–28, 2019	2019 U23 All–Russian Yuri Gusov Memorial	Vladikavkaz, Russia
2019 Russian Nationals (silver) at 70 kg
Loss	47–8	(North Ossetia–Alania) David Baev	10–10	July 4, 2019	2019 Russian National Championships	Sochi, Russia
Win	47–7	(Dagestan) Abdullagadzhi Magomedov	7–0	July 4, 2019	2019 Russian National Championships	Sochi, Russia
Win	46–7	(Dagestan) Magomedkhabib Kadimagomedov	13–7	July 4, 2019	2019 Russian National Championships	Sochi, Russia
Win	45–7	(North Ossetia–Alania) Chermen Valiev	5–0	July 4, 2019	2019 Russian National Championships	Sochi, Russia
Win	44–7	(Dagestan) Khalid Eldarbiev	TF 11–0	July 4, 2019	2019 Russian National Championships	Sochi, Russia
2019 Ali Aliev Memorial (gold) at 70 kg
Win	43–7	(Azerbaijan) Gitinomagomed Gadzhiev	8–0	May 1–3, 2019	2019 Ali Aliev Memorial International	Kaspiysk, Russia
Win	42–7	(Russia) Chermen Valiev	TF 11–0	May 1–3, 2019	2019 Ali Aliev Memorial International	Kaspiysk, Russia
Win	41–7	(Azerbaijan) Murtazali Muslimov	TF 10–0	May 1–3, 2019	2019 Ali Aliev Memorial International	Kaspiysk, Russia
Win	40–7	(Mongolia) Temuujin Mendbileg	TF 10–0	May 1–3, 2019	2019 Ali Aliev Memorial International	Kaspiysk, Russia
Win	39–7	(Azerbaijan) Joshgun Azimov	4–0	May 1–3, 2019	2019 Ali Aliev Memorial International	Kaspiysk, Russia
2019 U23 European Championships (gold) at 70 kg
Win	38–7	(Poland) Patryk Olenczyn	Fall	March 4–10, 2019	2019 U23 European Continental Championships	Novi Sad, Serbia
Win	37–7	(Moldova) Vasile Diacon	TF 10–0	March 4–10, 2019	2019 U23 European Continental Championships	Novi Sad, Serbia
Win	36–7	(Ukraine) Oleksii Boruta	7–1	March 4–10, 2019	2019 U23 European Continental Championships	Novi Sad, Serbia
Win	35–7	(Azerbaijan) Daud Ibragimov	TF 11–1	March 4–10, 2019	2019 U23 European Continental Championships	Novi Sad, Serbia
2019 Ivan Yarygin Golden Grand Prix (bronze) at 70 kg
Win	34–7	(North Ossetia–Alania) David Baev	8–4	January 24, 2019	Golden Grand Prix Ivan Yarygin 2019	Krasnoyarsk, Russia
Win	33–7	(United States) Jason Chamberlain	8–2	January 24, 2019	Golden Grand Prix Ivan Yarygin 2019	Krasnoyarsk, Russia
Loss	32–7	(Dagestan) Magomedrasul Gazimagomedov	0–6	January 24, 2019	Golden Grand Prix Ivan Yarygin 2019	Krasnoyarsk, Russia
2018 Alans International (bronze) at 70 kg
Win	32–6	(Russia) Ruslan Bogatyrev	TF 11–0	December 7–9, 2018	2018 Alans International	Vladikavkaz, Russia
Loss	31–6	(Russia) Magomed Kurbanaliev	3–4	December 7–9, 2018	2018 Alans International	Vladikavkaz, Russia
Win	31–5	(Russia) Vladislav Dyshekov	8–3	December 7–9, 2018	2018 Alans International	Vladikavkaz, Russia
Win	30–5	(Iran) Mohammad Yousefi Kamangar	TF 12–1	December 7–9, 2018	2018 Alans International	Vladikavkaz, Russia
Win	29–5	(Russia) Abdullagadzhi Magomedov	TF 13–0	December 7–9, 2018	2018 Alans International	Vladikavkaz, Russia
2018 Akhmat Kadyrov Cup (gold) for Team RUS at 70 kg
Win	28–5	(Mongolia) Enkhtuya Temuulen	Fall	November 23–26, 2018	2018 Akhmat Kadyrov Cup	Grozny, Russia
Win	27–5	(Kyrgyzstan) Adilet Anarbekov	TF 11–0	November 23–26, 2018	2018 Akhmat Kadyrov Cup	Grozny, Russia
2018 Intercontinental Cup (gold) at 70 kg
Win	26–5	(Azerbaijan) Aghahuseyn Mustafayev	8–4	November 15–19, 2018	2018 Intercontinental Cup	Khasavyurt, Russia
Win	25–5	(Russia) Abutalim Gamzaev	Fall	November 15–19, 2018	2018 Intercontinental Cup	Khasavyurt, Russia
Win	24–5	(Russia) Anzor Zakuev	8–3	November 15–19, 2018	2018 Intercontinental Cup	Khasavyurt, Russia
Win	23–5	(Lithuania) Artem Auga	TF 10–0	November 15–19, 2018	2018 Intercontinental Cup	Khasavyurt, Russia
2018 Russian Nationals 5th at 70 kg
Loss	22–5	(North Ossetia–Alania) David Baev	3–4	August 3–4, 2018	2018 Russian National Championships	Odintsovo, Russia
Loss	22–4	(Dagestan) Magomedrasul Gazimagomedov	1–2	August 3–4, 2018	2018 Russian National Championships	Odintsovo, Russia
Win	22–3	(Republic of Crimea (Russia)) Anzor Zakuev	8–1	August 3–4, 2018	2018 Russian National Championships	Odintsovo, Russia
Win	21–3	(Karachay-Cherkessia) Alibek Akbaev	TF 10–0	August 3–4, 2018	2018 Russian National Championships	Odintsovo, Russia
Win	20–3	(Moscow Oblast) Magomedkhan Tinamagomedov	TF 10–0	August 3–4, 2018	2018 Russian National Championships	Odintsovo, Russia
2018 Roman Dmitriev Memorial (gold) at 70 kg
Win	19–3	(Moldova) Vasile Diacon	Fall	March 2–4, 2018	2018 Roman Dmitriev Memorial International	Yakutsk, Russia
Win	18–3	(Kazakhstan) Nurkozha Kaipanov	TF 13–3	March 2–4, 2018	2018 Roman Dmitriev Memorial International	Yakutsk, Russia
Win	17–3	(Russia) Stiv Popov	TF 10–0	March 2–4, 2018	2018 Roman Dmitriev Memorial International	Yakutsk, Russia
Win	16–3	(Russia) Kirill Korneev	Fall	March 2–4, 2018	2018 Roman Dmitriev Memorial International	Yakutsk, Russia
2017 Stepan Sargsyan Cup (gold) at 65 kg
Win	15–3	(Armenia) Valodya Frangulyan	10–6	October 7–8, 2017	2017 Stepan Sargsyan Cup	Vanadzor, Armenia
Win	14–3	(Armenia) Narek Sirunyan	13–7	October 7–8, 2017	2017 Stepan Sargsyan Cup	Vanadzor, Armenia
Win	13–3	(Armenia) Vardges Karapetyan	TF 10–0	October 7–8, 2017	2017 Stepan Sargsyan Cup	Vanadzor, Armenia
Win	12–3	(Armenia) Gor Sirekanyan	TF 12–2	October 7–8, 2017	2017 Stepan Sargsyan Cup	Vanadzor, Armenia
2017 Aleksandr Medved Prizes 8th at 65 kg
Loss	11–3	(Russia) Islam Mazhitov	5–6	September 16–17, 2017	2017 Aleksandr Medved Prizes	Minsk, Belarus
Win	11–2	(Russia) Magomed Surkhoev	TF 10–0	September 16–17, 2017	2017 Aleksandr Medved Prizes	Minsk, Belarus
2017 Roman Dmitriev Memorial (gold) at 66 kg
Win	10–2	(Mongolia) Temuulen Enkhtuya	TF 10–0	March 4–5, 2017	2017 Roman Dmitriev Memorial International	Yakutsk, Russia
Win	9–2	(Russia) Nurgustan Broshchev	TF 10–0	March 4–5, 2017	2017 Roman Dmitriev Memorial International	Yakutsk, Russia
Win	8–2	(Russia) Egor Zakharov	TF 10–0	March 4–5, 2017	2017 Roman Dmitriev Memorial International	Yakutsk, Russia
Win	7–2	(Russia) Aisen Romanov	TF 10–0	March 4–5, 2017	2017 Roman Dmitriev Memorial International	Yakutsk, Russia
2017 Ivan Yarygin Golden Grand Prix 9th at 61 kg
Loss	6–2	(Chechnya) Bekkhan Goygereyev	2–6	January 28, 2017	Golden Grand Prix Ivan Yarygin 2017	Krasnoyarsk, Russia
Win	6–1	(Krasnoyarsk Krai) Ruslan Zhendaev	TF 10–0	January 28, 2017	Golden Grand Prix Ivan Yarygin 2017	Krasnoyarsk, Russia
Win	5–1	(Sakha Republic) Dyulustan Bulatov	3–1	January 28, 2017	Golden Grand Prix Ivan Yarygin 2017	Krasnoyarsk, Russia
2016 Intercontinental Cup (gold) at 61 kg
Win	4–1	(Kazakhstan) Daulet Niyazbekov	6–5	November 14, 2016	2016 Intercontinental Cup	Khasavyurt, Russia
Win	3–1			November 14, 2016	2016 Intercontinental Cup	Khasavyurt, Russia
Win	2–1			November 14, 2016	2016 Intercontinental Cup	Khasavyurt, Russia
2016 Ali Aliev Memorial 10th at 61 kg
Loss	1–1	(Russia) Bekkhan Goygereyev	TF 0–10	July 1–3, 2016	2016 Ali Aliev Memorial International	Makhachkala, Russia
Win	1–0	(Russia) Savr Shalburov	TF 12–0	July 1–3, 2016	2016 Ali Aliev Memorial International	Makhachkala, Russia
