= 2022 Russian National Freestyle Wrestling Championships =

Russian national championship in combat sports

2022 Russian Nationals
- Host city: Kyzyl, Tuva, Russia
- Dates: June 24–26
- Stadium: Sport complex of Subedey

Champions
- Freestyle: Dagestan

The Russian National Freestyle Wrestling Championships 2022 (also known as the Russian Nationals 2022) was held in Kyzyl, Tuva by the Russian Wrestling Federation at the Sport complex of Subedey between 24 June to 26 June 2022.

== Men's freestyle ==
Event	Gold	Silver	Bronze
57 kg	(Dagestan) Zaur Uguev	(Tuva) Nachyn Mongush	(Dagestan) Musa Mekhtikhanov
57 kg	(Dagestan) Zaur Uguev	(Tuva) Nachyn Mongush	(Dagestan) Ramiz Gamzatov
61 kg	(Dagestan) Abasgadzhi Magomedov	(Dagestan) Akhmed Idrisov	(Dagestan) Bashir Magomedov
61 kg	(Dagestan) Abasgadzhi Magomedov	(Dagestan) Akhmed Idrisov	(North Ossetia–Alania) Chermen Tavitov
65 kg	(Dagestan) Ibragim Ibragimov	(Dagestan) Gadzhimurad Omarov	(Yakutia) Aikhaan Antonov
65 kg	(Dagestan) Ibragim Ibragimov	(Dagestan) Gadzhimurad Omarov	(Kaliningrad) Arip Abdulaev
70 kg	(Krasnoyarsk Krai) Israil Kasumov	(Republic of Crimea (Russia)) Anzor Zakuev	(Yakutia) Viktor Rassadin
70 kg	(Krasnoyarsk Krai) Israil Kasumov	(Republic of Crimea (Russia)) Anzor Zakuev	(Dagestan) Kurban Shiraev
74 kg	(Dagestan) Razambek Zhamalov	(North Ossetia–Alania) Chermen Valiev	(North Ossetia–Alania) David Baev
74 kg	(Dagestan) Razambek Zhamalov	(North Ossetia–Alania) Chermen Valiev	(Dagestan) Magoma Dibirgadzhiev
79 kg	(Republic of Crimea (Russia)) Malik Shavaev	(Dagestan) Magomed Magomaev	(North Ossetia–Alania) Radik Valiev
79 kg	(Republic of Crimea (Russia)) Malik Shavaev	(Dagestan) Magomed Magomaev	(Krasnoyarsk Krai) Nikita Suchkov
86 kg	(North Ossetia–Alania) Artur Naifonov	(Dagestan) Amanula Rasulov	(Dagestan) Arsen-Ali Musalaliev
86 kg	(North Ossetia–Alania) Artur Naifonov	(Dagestan) Amanula Rasulov	(Dagestan) Ada Magomedov
92 kg	(Dagestan) Magomed Kurbanov	(Republic of Crimea (Russia)) Azamat Zakuev	(Dagestan) Magomed Sharipov
92 kg	(Dagestan) Magomed Kurbanov	(Republic of Crimea (Russia)) Azamat Zakuev	(North Ossetia–Alania) Vladislav Valiev
97 kg	(North Ossetia–Alania) Aslanbek Sotiev	(Dagestan) Shamil Musaev	(Dagestan) Akhmed Tazhudinov
97 kg	(North Ossetia–Alania) Aslanbek Sotiev	(Dagestan) Shamil Musaev	(North Ossetia–Alania) Sergey Kozyrev
125 kg	(North Ossetia–Alania) Alen Khubulov	(Chechnya) Tamerlan Rasuev	(Buryatia) Baldan Tsyzhipov
125 kg	(North Ossetia–Alania) Alen Khubulov	(Chechnya) Tamerlan Rasuev	(Krasnoyarsk Krai) Eric Dzhioev

== See also ==
- 2021 Russian National Freestyle Wrestling Championships
- 2020 Russian National Freestyle Wrestling Championships
- 2019 Russian National Freestyle Wrestling Championships
- 2018 Russian National Freestyle Wrestling Championships
- 2017 Russian National Freestyle Wrestling Championships
- Soviet and Russian results in men's freestyle wrestling
