= 2020 Golden Grand Prix Ivan Yarygin =

Ivan Yarygin 2020
- Host city: Krasnoyarsk, Russia
- Dates: January 23–26
- Stadium: Ivan Yarygin Sports Palace

Champions
- Freestyle: (North Ossetia–Alania) North Ossetia-Alania
- Women: Russia

The XXXI Golden Grand Prix Ivan Yarygin 2020, also known as Ivan Yarygin (Yariguin) 2020 is a United World Wrestling rankings freestyle wrestling international tournament, which was held in Krasnoyarsk, Russia between 23 and 26 January 2020.

== Medal overview ==
=== Medal table ===
Rank	Nation	Gold	Silver	Bronze	Total
1	Russia	5	2	7	14
2	(North Ossetia–Alania) North Ossetia-Alania	4	2	5	11
3	Dagestan	3	5	8	16
4	Mongolia	3	3	6	12
5	Buryatia	2	0	2	4
6	Japan	1	4	0	5
7	Krasnoyarsk Krai	1	1	0	2
8	China	1	0	3	4
9	Chechnya	0	2	1	3
10	Kazakhstan	0	1	2	3
11	Tuva	0	0	2	2
11	United States	0	0	2	2
13	Kabardino-Balkaria	0	0	1	1
13	Sakha Republic	0	0	1	1
Totals (14 entries)		20	20	40	80

=== Men's freestyle ===
Event	Gold	Silver	Bronze
57 kg	(North Ossetia–Alania) Azamat Tuskaev	(Dagestan) Akhmed Idrisov	(Sakha Republic) Aryian Tyutrin
57 kg	(North Ossetia–Alania) Azamat Tuskaev	(Dagestan) Akhmed Idrisov	(Dagestan) Ramiz Gamzatov
61 kg	(Buryatia) Aleksandr Bogomoev	(Dagestan) Ramazan Ferzaliev	(Dagestan) Abasgadzhi Magomedov
61 kg	(Buryatia) Aleksandr Bogomoev	(Dagestan) Ramazan Ferzaliev	(Tuva) Kezhik Chymba
65 kg	(Dagestan) Kurban Shiraev	(North Ossetia–Alania) Soslan Ramonov	(Tuva) Nachyn Kuular
65 kg	(Dagestan) Kurban Shiraev	(North Ossetia–Alania) Soslan Ramonov	(Buryatia) Dasha Sharastepanov
70 kg	(Krasnoyarsk Krai) Israil Kasumov	(North Ossetia–Alania) David Baev	(Buryatia) Yevgeny Zherbaev
70 kg	(Krasnoyarsk Krai) Israil Kasumov	(North Ossetia–Alania) David Baev	(North Ossetia–Alania) Chermen Valiev
74 kg	(Dagestan) Magomedrasul Gazimagomedov	(Chechnya) Razambek Zhamalov	(Dagestan) Magomed Kurbanaliev
74 kg	(Dagestan) Magomedrasul Gazimagomedov	(Chechnya) Razambek Zhamalov	(North Ossetia–Alania) Khetag Tsabolov
79 kg	(Dagestan) Magomed Ramazanov	(Dagestan) Akhmed Gadzhimagomedov	(Dagestan) Khalil Aminov
79 kg	(Dagestan) Magomed Ramazanov	(Dagestan) Akhmed Gadzhimagomedov	(Chechnya) Khalid Yakhev
86 kg	(North Ossetia–Alania) Artur Naifonov	(Dagestan) Dauren Kurugliev	(Dagestan) Magomedsharif Biyakaev
86 kg	(North Ossetia–Alania) Artur Naifonov	(Dagestan) Dauren Kurugliev	(Dagestan) Arsen-Ali Musalaliev
92 kg	(North Ossetia–Alania) Batyrbek Tsakulov	(Chechnya) Alikhan Zhabrailov	(North Ossetia–Alania) Radik Nartikoev
92 kg	(North Ossetia–Alania) Batyrbek Tsakulov	(Chechnya) Alikhan Zhabrailov	(Kabardino-Balkaria) Anzor Urishev
97 kg	(North Ossetia–Alania) Vladislav Baitcaev	(Dagestan) Magomedkhan Magomedov	(Dagestan) Shamil Musaev
97 kg	(North Ossetia–Alania) Vladislav Baitcaev	(Dagestan) Magomedkhan Magomedov	(North Ossetia–Alania) Georgy Gogaev
125 kg	(Buryatia) Baldan Tsyzhipov	(Krasnoyarsk Krai) Pavel Krivtsov	(Dagestan) Shamil Sharipov
125 kg	(Buryatia) Baldan Tsyzhipov	(Krasnoyarsk Krai) Pavel Krivtsov	(North Ossetia–Alania) Alan Khugaev

=== Women's freestyle ===
Event	Gold	Silver	Bronze
50 kg	(Mongolia) Tsogt-Ochiryn Namuuntsetseg	(Russia) Nadezhda Sokolova	(Russia) Anzhelika Vetoshkina
50 kg	(Mongolia) Tsogt-Ochiryn Namuuntsetseg	(Russia) Nadezhda Sokolova	(United States) Victoria Anthony
53 kg	(Japan) Umi Imai	(Mongolia) Erdenechimegiin Sumiyaa	(Mongolia) Bat-Ochiryn Bolortuyaa
53 kg	(Japan) Umi Imai	(Mongolia) Erdenechimegiin Sumiyaa	(Mongolia) Otgonjargal Ganbaatar
55 kg	(Russia) Olga Khoroshavtseva	(Japan) Kana Higashikawa	(Russia) Ekaterina Isakova
55 kg	(Russia) Olga Khoroshavtseva	(Japan) Kana Higashikawa	(Russia) Anastasiya Sidelnikova
57 kg	(Russia) Veronika Chumikova	(Japan) Andoria Hanako Sawa	(Mongolia) Battsetseg Altantsetseg
57 kg	(Russia) Veronika Chumikova	(Japan) Andoria Hanako Sawa	(Mongolia) Khonogorzul Boldsaikhan
59 kg	(Mongolia) Baatarjavyn Shoovdor	(Russia) Khadizhat Murtuzalieva	(Kazakhstan) Madina Bakbergenova
59 kg	(Mongolia) Baatarjavyn Shoovdor	(Russia) Khadizhat Murtuzalieva	(Russia) Anastasiya Yakovleva
62 kg	(Mongolia) Khürelkhüügiin Bolortuyaa	(Mongolia) Purevsuren Ulzisaikhan	(China) Bao Ling Ling
62 kg	(Mongolia) Khürelkhüügiin Bolortuyaa	(Mongolia) Purevsuren Ulzisaikhan	(China) Zhan Ksinyan
65 kg	(Russia) Maria Kuznetsova	(Japan) Miyu Imai	(Russia) Yulia Prontsevich
65 kg	(Russia) Maria Kuznetsova	(Japan) Miyu Imai	(Russia) Natalya Fedoseeva
68 kg	(Russia) Khanum Velieva	(Japan) Rin Miyaji	(Mongolia) Ochirbatyn Nasanburmaa
68 kg	(Russia) Khanum Velieva	(Japan) Rin Miyaji	(United States) Forrest Molinari
72 kg	(Russia) Kseniya Burakova	(Kazakhstan) Zhamila Bakbergenova	(Mongolia) Davaanasan Enh Amar
72 kg	(Russia) Kseniya Burakova	(Kazakhstan) Zhamila Bakbergenova	(Russia) Kristina Dudaeva
76 kg	(China) Wang Juan	(Mongolia) Ochirbatyn Burmaa	(China) Yanuan Huan
76 kg	(China) Wang Juan	(Mongolia) Ochirbatyn Burmaa	(Kazakhstan) Gulmaral Yerkebayeva

== Participating nations ==
365 competitors from 13 nations participated.

- Belarus (3)
- China (8)
- Japan (8)
- Greece (1)
- Israel (1)
- Jordan (1)
- Kazakhstan (44)
- Moldova (3)
- Mongolia (83)
- Russia (203)
- Tajikistan (1)
- United States (3)
- Uzbekistan (6)
