= Golden Grand Prix Ivan Yarygin 2019 – Men's freestyle 70 kg =

The men's freestyle 57 kg is a wrestling competition featured at the Golden Grand Prix Ivan Yarygin 2019, and was held in Krasnoyarsk, Russia on 24 January.

== Medalists ==
Gold	(Dagestan) Magomedrasul Gazimagomedov
Silver	Ganzorigiin Mandakhnaran (MGL)
Bronze	(Chechnya) Razambek Zhamalov
Bronze	Bekhbayar Erdenebat (MGL)

== Results ==
Legend

- F — Won by fall
- WO — Won by walkover (forfeit)

=== Final ===
Final
Ganzorigiin Mandakhnaran (MGL)	0
(Dagestan) Magomedrasul Gazimagomedov	10

=== Top half ===
Round of 8
Jason Chamberlain (USA)
Katai Yeerlanbieke (CHN)
(Dagestan) Magomedrasul Gazimagomedov	6
(Chechnya) Razambek Zhamalov	0
James Green (USA)	13
Perman Hommadov (TKM)	0
Temuulen Enkhtuya (MGL)	2
(North Ossetia–Alania) David Baev	14

Round of 4
Askhat Slyamkhanov (KAZ)	4
Batyr Borjakov (TKM)	2
Ganzorigiin Mandakhnaran (MGL)	10
Byambadorj Enkhbayar (MGL)	0
Jason Chamberlain (USA)	0
(Dagestan) Magomedrasul Gazimagomedov	12
James Green (USA)	2
(North Ossetia–Alania) David Baev	10

Semifinals
Askhat Slyamkhanov (KAZ)	4
Ganzorigiin Mandakhnaran (MGL)	9
(Dagestan) Magomedrasul Gazimagomedov	2
(North Ossetia–Alania) David Baev	2

Final
Ganzorigiin Mandakhnaran (MGL)	0
(Dagestan) Magomedrasul Gazimagomedov	10

== Repechage ==
Repechage
(Chechnya) Razambek Zhamalov	8
Jason Chamberlain (USA)	2

Bronze medals
(Chechnya) Razambek Zhamalov	8
(North Ossetia–Alania) David Baev	4
Bekhbayar Erdenebat (MGL)	8
Askhat Slyamkhanov (KAZ)	0
