= Shamil Musaev =

Russian freestyle wrestler

Personal information
- Full name: Shamil Alievitch Musaev
- National team: Russia
- Born: Шамиль Алиевич Мусаев; 6 September 1997 (age 28) Mogilyovskoye, Dagestan, Russia
- Weight: 97 kg (214 lb)

Sport
- Country: Russia
- Sport: Amateur wrestling
- Event: Freestyle
Medal record
Men's freestyle wrestling
Representing Russia
BRICS Games
Gold medal – first place	2024 Kazan	125 kg
Golden Grand Prix Ivan Yarygin
Gold medal – first place	2019 Krasnoyarsk	97 kg
Gold medal – first place	2026 Krasnoyarsk	125 kg
Silver medal – second place	2024 Krasnoyarsk	97 kg
Silver medal – second place	2022 Krasnoyarsk	97 kg
Grand Prix
Gold medal – first place	2024 Vladikavkaz	125 kg
Poddubny wrestling league
Silver medal – second place	2024 Moscow	Team
U23 World Championships
Silver medal – second place	2019 Budapest	97 kg
U23 European Championships
Silver medal – second place	2019 Novi Sad	97 kg
Junior World Championships
Gold medal – first place	2017 Tampere	96 kg
Representing Dagestan
Russian National Championships
Silver medal – second place	2022 Tuva	97 kg
Silver medal – second place	2024 Novoivanovskoye	125 kg
Bronze medal – third place	2019 Krasnodar Krai	97 kg
Bronze medal – third place	2025 Moscow	125 kg

Shamil Alievitch Musaev is a Russian freestyle wrestler who currently competes at 97 kilograms. The 2017 Junior World Champion, Musaev was the 2019 U23 World and European silver medalist and has medaled at prestigious Russian tournaments, such as the Russian Nationals and the Golden Grand Prix Ivan Yarygin (including a gold medal performance in 2019).
