= 2024 Golden Grand Prix Ivan Yarygin =

Freestyle wrestling international tournament in Krasnoyarsk, Russia

Ivan Yarygin 2024
- Host city: Krasnoyarsk, Russia
- Dates: 24-28 January 2024
- Stadium: Ivan Yarygin Sports Palace

The XXXV (35th) Golden Grand Prix Ivan Yarygin 2024, also known as Ivan Yarygin (Yariguin) 2024, Ivan Yarygin's cup was a freestyle wrestling international tournament held in Krasnoyarsk, Russia between 24 and 28 January 2024.

== Event videos ==
The event will air freely on the wrestlingtv.ru channel.

Broadcasting
25 January 2024 Mat A	25 January 2024 Mat B	25 January 2024 Mat C
26 January 2024 Mat A	26 January 2024 Mat B	26 January 2024 Mat C
27 January 2024 Mat A	27 January 2024 Mat B	27 January 2024 Mat C
28 January 2024 Mat A	28 January 2024 Mat B	28 January 2024 Mat C

== Medal table ==
Rank	Nation	Gold	Silver	Bronze	Total
1	Dagestan	6	3	10	19
2	Mongolia	4	7	2	13
3	Kemerovo Oblast	2	1	0	3
4	Krasnoyarsk Krai	2	0	1	3
5	Belarus	1	2	1	4
6	Saint Petersburg	1	1	2	4
7	Khanty-Mansi Autonomous Okrug	1	1	0	2
8	Khakassia	1	0	1	2
9	Chechnya	1	0	0	1
9	Chuvashia	1	0	0	1
11	Moscow Oblast	0	2	2	4
12	(Autonomous Republic of Crimea) Crimea	0	1	3	4
13	Bryansk Oblast	0	1	0	1
13	Iran	0	1	0	1
15	Uzbekistan	0	0	4	4
16	Kyrgyzstan	0	0	3	3
17	Rostov Oblast	0	0	2	2
17	(Sakha Republic) Yakutia	0	0	2	2
19	Azerbaijan	0	0	1	1
19	Buryatia	0	0	1	1
19	China	0	0	1	1
19	Krasnodar Krai	0	0	1	1
19	Sakhalin Oblast	0	0	1	1
19	Tatarstan	0	0	1	1
19	Tuva	0	0	1	1
Totals (25 entries)		20	20	40	80

== Medal overview ==
=== Men's freestyle ===
Event	Gold	Silver	Bronze
57 kg	Zaur Uguev; Dagestan	Musa Mekhtikhanov; Dagestan	Gulomjon Abdullaev; Uzbekistan
57 kg	Zaur Uguev; Dagestan	Musa Mekhtikhanov; Dagestan	Akhmed Idrisov; Dagestan
61 kg	Abasgadzhi Magomedov; Dagestan	Muslim Mekhtikhanov; Dagestan	Sardor Ruzimov; Uzbekistan
61 kg	Abasgadzhi Magomedov; Dagestan	Muslim Mekhtikhanov; Dagestan	Kezhik Mongush; Tuva
65 kg	Gadzhimurad Rashidov; Dagestan	Tömör-Ochiryn Tulga; Mongolia	Dalgat Abdulkadyrov; Dagestan
65 kg	Gadzhimurad Rashidov; Dagestan	Tömör-Ochiryn Tulga; Mongolia	Aripgadzhi Abdulaev; Dagestan
70 kg	Kurban Shiraev; Dagestan	Inalbek Sheriev; Moscow Oblast	Magomed Khaniev; Azerbaijan
70 kg	Kurban Shiraev; Dagestan	Inalbek Sheriev; Moscow Oblast	Aisen Potapov; Yakutia
74 kg	Magomedkhabib Kadimagomedov; Belarus	David Baev; Khanty-Mansi Autonomous Okrug	Magoma Dibirgadzhiev; Dagestan
74 kg	Magomedkhabib Kadimagomedov; Belarus	David Baev; Khanty-Mansi Autonomous Okrug	Bekzod Abdurakhmonov; Uzbekistan
79 kg	Khalid Yakhiev; Chechnya	Magomed Magomaev; Bryansk Oblast	Akhmed Usmanov; Dagestan
79 kg	Khalid Yakhiev; Chechnya	Magomed Magomaev; Bryansk Oblast	Kasum Kasumov; Dagestan
86 kg	Artur Naifonov; Khanty-Mansi Autonomous Okrug	Arslan Bagaev; Moscow	Tazhitin Akaev; Moscow
86 kg	Artur Naifonov; Khanty-Mansi Autonomous Okrug	Arslan Bagaev; Moscow	Malik Shavaev; Dagestan
92 kg	Magomed Kurbanov; Dagestan	Mohammad Mobin Azimi; Iran	Azamat Zakuev; Crimea
92 kg	Magomed Kurbanov; Dagestan	Mohammad Mobin Azimi; Iran	Mustafagadzhi Malachdibirov; Dagestan
97 kg	Abdulrashid Sadulaev; Dagestan	Shamil Musaev; Dagestan	Ramazan Shabanov; Dagestan
97 kg	Abdulrashid Sadulaev; Dagestan	Shamil Musaev; Dagestan	Aliaksandr Hushtyn; Belarus
125 kg	Zelimkhan Khizriev; Saint Petersburg	Anzor Khizriev; Saint Petersburg	Nikita Khabarov; Yakutia
125 kg	Zelimkhan Khizriev; Saint Petersburg	Anzor Khizriev; Saint Petersburg	Deng Zhiwei; China

=== Women's freestyle ===
Event	Gold	Silver	Bronze
50 kg	Maria Tiumerekova; Kemerovo Oblast	Munkhgerel Munkhbat; Mongolia	Polina Lukina; Rostov Oblast
50 kg	Maria Tiumerekova; Kemerovo Oblast	Munkhgerel Munkhbat; Mongolia	Natalia Pudova; Khakassia
53 kg	Natalia Malysheva; Khakassia	Anzhelika Vetoshkina; Kemerovo Oblast	Milana Dadasheva; Dagestan
53 kg	Natalia Malysheva; Khakassia	Anzhelika Vetoshkina; Kemerovo Oblast	Irina Ologonova; Buryatia
55 kg	Batkhuyagiin Khulan; Mongolia	Otgontuya Bayanmunkh; Mongolia	Aleksandra Skirenko; Krasnodar Krai
55 kg	Batkhuyagiin Khulan; Mongolia	Otgontuya Bayanmunkh; Mongolia	Bat-Ochiryn Bolortuyaa; Mongolia
57 kg	Veronika Chumikova; Chuvashia	Enkhbatyn Gantuyaa; Mongolia	Marina Simonyan; Rostov Oblast
57 kg	Veronika Chumikova; Chuvashia	Enkhbatyn Gantuyaa; Mongolia	Kristina Mikhneva; Crimea
59 kg	Anastasiia Sidelnikova; Kemerovo Oblast	Erdenechimegiin Sumiyaa; Mongolia	Kalmira Bilimbekova; Kyrgyzstan
59 kg	Anastasiia Sidelnikova; Kemerovo Oblast	Erdenechimegiin Sumiyaa; Mongolia	Svetlana Lipatova; Tatarstan
62 kg	Sükheegiin Tserenchimed; Mongolia	Krystsina Sazykina; Belarus	Zharkynai Nurlan Kyzy; Kyrgyzstan
62 kg	Sükheegiin Tserenchimed; Mongolia	Krystsina Sazykina; Belarus	Daria Bobrulko; Bryansk Oblast
65 kg	Dinara Kudaeva; Krasnoyarsk Krai	Amina Tandelova; Crimea	Elizaveta Petliakova; Saint Petersburg
65 kg	Dinara Kudaeva; Krasnoyarsk Krai	Amina Tandelova; Crimea	Enkhjin Tuvshinjargal; Mongolia
68 kg	Khanum Velieva; Krasnoyarsk Krai	Alina Shevchuk; Belarus	Nabira Esenbaeva; Uzbekistan
68 kg	Khanum Velieva; Krasnoyarsk Krai	Alina Shevchuk; Belarus	Anastasiia Parakhina; Sakhalin Oblast
72 kg	Bolortungalag Zorigt; Mongolia	Ochirbatyn Burmaa; Mongolia	Nurzat Nurtaeva; Kyrgyzstan
72 kg	Bolortungalag Zorigt; Mongolia	Ochirbatyn Burmaa; Mongolia	Olesiia Bezuglova; Saint Petersburg
76 kg	Davaanasan Enkh-Amar; Mongolia	Gan-Ochir Urtnasan; Mongolia	Kristina Shumova; Krasnoyarsk Krai
76 kg	Davaanasan Enkh-Amar; Mongolia	Gan-Ochir Urtnasan; Mongolia	Ekaterina Bukina; Moscow Oblast

== Participating nations ==
24 nations participated.

- Azerbaijan
- Albania
- Argentina
- Armenia
- Belarus
- China
- Cuba
- Ecuador
- Georgia
- India
- Iran
- Kazakhstan
- Kyrgyzstan
- Moldova
- Mongolia
- Russia
- Romania
- South Korea
- Syria
- Tajikistan
- Turkey
- Turkmenistan
- Uzbekistan
- Venezuela
