= Magomed Ramazanov =

Russian-Bulgarian sport wrestler (born 1993)

Personal information
- Native name: Магомед Рамазанов
- Full name: Magomed Eldarovich Ramazanov
- Born: Магомед Эльдарович Рамазанов; May 22, 1993 (age 33) Oktyaborskoe village, Khasavyurtovsky District, Dagestan, Russia
- Height: 1.72 m (5 ft 8 in)

Sport
- Country: Russia (2016–2021); Romania (2022–2023); Bulgaria (2024–2026)
- Sport: Wrestling
- Weight class: 86 kg (190 lb)
- Rank: International Master of Sports
- Event: Freestyle
- Club: CSKA Sofia
- Coached by: Khaibula Abdulaev; Abubakar Medzhidov; Ikhaku Gaiderbekov; Magomed Guseinov; Evgeny Ivanov; Vadim Biyaz (present)
Medal record
Men's freestyle wrestling
Representing Bulgaria
Olympic Games
Gold medal – first place	2024 Paris	86 kg
European Championship
Gold medal – first place	2025 Bratislava	86 kg
Grand Prix
Gold medal – first place	2024 Zagreb	86 kg
Silver medal – second place	2026 Ulaanbaatar	86 kg
Representing Russia
World Cup
Gold medal – first place	2019 Yakutsk	Team
European Championships
Silver medal – second place	2020 Rome	79 kg
World Military Championships
Gold medal – first place	2018 Moscow	86 kg
Russian National Championships
Bronze medal – third place	2019 Sochi	86 kg
Bronze medal – third place	2020 Naro-Fominsk	86 kg
Bronze medal – third place	2021 Ulan-Ude	86 kg
Grand Prix
Gold medal – first place	2018 Warsaw	79 kg
Gold medal – first place	2019 Kaspisk	79 kg
Gold medal – first place	2019 Minsk	79 kg
Gold medal – first place	2019 Moscow	Team
Gold medal – first place	2020 Krasnoyarsk	79 kg
Gold medal – first place	2021 Nice	86 kg
Gold medal – first place	2021 Sassari	86 kg
Silver medal – second place	2018 Grozny	Team
Silver medal – second place	2018 Tbilisi	79 kg
Silver medal – second place	2019 Krasnoyarsk	79 kg
Bronze medal – third place	2016 Khasavyurt	74 kg
Bronze medal – third place	2017 Kaspisk	74 kg
Bronze medal – third place	2019 Taras	79 kg

Magomed Eldarovich Ramazanov (Russian: Магомед Эльдарович Рамазанов; born 22 May 1993) is a Russian freestyle wrestler who competes at 86 kilograms. He represented Romania from 2022 until 2023 and then Bulgaria at the 2024 Summer Olympics, where he claimed the gold medal. Before transferring to Bulgaria in 2024, he was a European silver medalist and a three-time Russian National medalist.

== Background and career ==
Magomed Ramazanov was born in the little village of Oktyaborskoe, located close to Khasavyurt, Dagestan. He started training in wrestling at the age of seven, and trained in different places: in Astrakhan under Khaibula Abdulaev and in Moscow under Ikhaku Gaiderbekov.

The first big achievement came to him at the Ziolkowski International 2018 in the 79 kg category, where he placed 1st and didn't give up a single point. In the final match he beat the Georgian 2012 Olympian Davit Khutsishvili. At the Russian Nationals 2019 he placed 3rd, and in August 2019 at the Alexander Medved tournament in Minsk he won a gold medal. At the Golden Grand Prix Ivan Yarygin 2020 he came in first; in the final match he beat the World Championship 2018 bronze medalist Akhmed Gadzhimagomedov of Russia. At the European Championships 2020 he faced countryman Magomedkhabib Kadimagomedov in the final match, where he lost by decision.

He competed at the 2024 European Wrestling Olympic Qualification Tournament in Baku, Azerbaijan hoping to qualify for the 2024 Summer Olympics in Paris, France. He was eliminated in his second match and he did not qualify for the Olympics.

A month later, he earned a quota place for Bulgaria for the Olympics at the 2024 World Wrestling Olympic Qualification Tournament held in Istanbul, Turkey. Ramazanov entered his first Olympic competition at the 2024 Summer Olympics in Paris, France. He defeated the biggest favourite Hassan Yazdani 7–1 in the final match of the Men's freestyle wrestling 86 kg and won the gold medal. This was the first Olympic gold medal in freestyle wrestling for Bulgaria in 28 years.

Ramazanov has been representing the Moscow-based CSKA wrestling club since 2019, under wrestling coach Vadim Biyaz.

After the 2025 European championships it was announced that Ramazanov had parted with the Bulgarian national team.

However, Magomed made his competitive return at the 2026 Ulaanbaatar Open. The Bulgarian wrestler, who had been sidelined due to injury and surgery after winning the 2025 European Championships. Magomet compete in 86kg. He recorded dominant victories over Bolat Sakayev (KAZ) 8–2, Abdulmuslim Abulmuslimov (RUS) 5–0, and Batbilguun Naadambat (MGL) 10–0 before injury defaulting the final to Mohammad Nokhodi (IRI), earning a silver medal.

== Championships and accomplishments ==
- 2016 Intercontinental cup – 1st. (74 kg, Khasavyurt, Russia)
- 2018 Ziolkowski International – 1st. (79 kg, Warsaw, Poland)
- 2019 World Cup – 1st. (Yakutsk, Russia)
- 2019 Russian National Championships – 3rd. (Sochi, Russia)
- 2019 Ali Aliyev Memorial – 1st. (79 kg, Kaspiysk, Russia)
- 2020 Ivan Yarygin – 1st. (79 kg, Krasnoyarsk, Russia)
- 2020 European Championships – 2nd. (79 kg, Rome, Italy)
- 2024 Summer Olympics – 1st. (86 kg, Paris, France)
- 2020 European Championships – 1st. (86 kg, Bratislava, Slovakia)

== Personal life ==
He has a younger brother Ramazan Ramazanov, who also represents Bulgaria at the international level. Magomed became popular on social networks among MMA fans because he bears a slight resemblance to former lightweight UFC champion Khabib Nurmagomedov.
