= 2019 European U23 Wrestling Championships =

2019 European U23 Wrestling Championship
- Host city: Novi Sad, Serbia
- Dates: March 4–10, 2019

Champions
- Freestyle: Russia
- Greco-Roman: Georgia
- Women: Russia

The 2019 European U23 Wrestling Championships was the 5th edition of European U23 Wrestling Championships of combined events, and took place from March 4 to 10 in Novi Sad, Serbia.

== Medal table ==
* Host nation (Serbia)

Rank	Nation	Gold	Silver	Bronze	Total
1	Russia	11	8	6	25
2	Georgia	5	2	6	13
3	Ukraine	3	5	5	13
4	Turkey	2	5	11	18
5	Belarus	2	0	4	6
5	Hungary	2	0	4	6
7	Armenia	1	1	1	3
7	Poland	1	1	1	3
9	Germany	1	1	0	2
10	Moldova	1	0	1	2
11	Finland	1	0	0	1
12	Romania	0	4	3	7
13	Greece	0	1	0	1
13	Serbia*	0	1	0	1
13	Slovakia	0	1	0	1
16	Bulgaria	0	0	5	5
17	Azerbaijan	0	0	4	4
18	France	0	0	2	2
19	Croatia	0	0	1	1
19	Great Britain	0	0	1	1
19	Sweden	0	0	1	1
Totals (21 entries)		30	30	56	116

== Team ranking ==
Rank	Men's freestyle		Men's Greco-Roman		Women's freestyle	
Rank	Team	Points	Team	Points	Team	Points
1	Russia	178	Georgia	203	Russia	180
2	Turkey	132	Russia	167	Ukraine	168
3	Ukraine	110	Turkey	141	Turkey	118
4	Georgia	109	Romania	78	Belarus	90
5	Belarus	82	Ukraine	70	Romania	85

== Medal summary ==
=== Men's freestyle ===
Event	Gold	Silver	Bronze
57 kg	(Ukraine) Andriy Yatsenko	(Russia) Amirkhan Guvazhokov	(Turkey) Şaban Kızıltaş
57 kg	(Ukraine) Andriy Yatsenko	(Russia) Amirkhan Guvazhokov	(Georgia (country)) Roberti Dingashvili
61 kg	(Russia) Abasgadzhi Magomedov	(Greece) Georgios Pilidis	(Turkey) Selehattin Sert
61 kg	(Russia) Abasgadzhi Magomedov	(Greece) Georgios Pilidis	(Azerbaijan) Asgar Mammadaliyev
65 kg	(Armenia) Vazgen Tevanyan	(Georgia (country)) Edemi Bolkvadze	(France) Ilman Mukhtarov
65 kg	(Armenia) Vazgen Tevanyan	(Georgia (country)) Edemi Bolkvadze	(Hungary) Roman Asharin
70 kg	(Russia) Razambek Zhamalov	(Poland) Patryk Olenczyn	(Azerbaijan) Daud Ibragimov
70 kg	(Russia) Razambek Zhamalov	(Poland) Patryk Olenczyn	(Bulgaria) Mihail Georgiev
74 kg	(Russia) Nikita Suchkov	(Slovakia) Akhsarbek Gulaev	(Georgia (country)) Giorgi Sulava
74 kg	(Russia) Nikita Suchkov	(Slovakia) Akhsarbek Gulaev	(Armenia) Khachatur Papikyan
79 kg	(Russia) Radik Valiev	(Turkey) Ramazan Sarı	(Georgia (country)) Tariel Gaphrindashvili
79 kg	(Russia) Radik Valiev	(Turkey) Ramazan Sarı	(Ukraine) Adlan Bataiev
86 kg	(Russia) Arsen-Ali Musalaliev	(Turkey) Arif Özen	(Georgia (country)) Zaur Beradze
86 kg	(Russia) Arsen-Ali Musalaliev	(Turkey) Arif Özen	(Azerbaijan) Gadzhimurad Magomedsaidov
92 kg	(Russia) Batyrbek Tsakulov	(Ukraine) Vasyl Sova	(Azerbaijan) Shamil Zubairov
92 kg	(Russia) Batyrbek Tsakulov	(Ukraine) Vasyl Sova	(Turkey) Erhan Yaylacı
97 kg	(Turkey) İbrahim Çiftçi	(Russia) Shamil Musaev	(Belarus) Dzianis Khramiankou
97 kg	(Turkey) İbrahim Çiftçi	(Russia) Shamil Musaev	(Georgia (country)) Givi Matcharashvili
125 kg	(Belarus) Vitali Piasniak	(Ukraine) Yurii Idzinskyi	(Poland) Kamil Kosciolek
125 kg	(Belarus) Vitali Piasniak	(Ukraine) Yurii Idzinskyi	(Russia) Vitalii Goloev

=== Men's Greco-Roman ===
Event	Gold	Silver	Bronze
55 kg	(Georgia (country)) Nugzari Tsurtsumia	(Romania) Florin Tița	(Russia) Viktor Vedernikov
55 kg	(Georgia (country)) Nugzari Tsurtsumia	(Romania) Florin Tița	(Moldova) Artiom Deleanu
60 kg	(Turkey) Kerem Kamal	(Romania) Răzvan Arnăut	(Bulgaria) Ivo Iliev
60 kg	(Turkey) Kerem Kamal	(Romania) Răzvan Arnăut	(Russia) Sadyk Lalaev
63 kg	(Georgia (country)) Levani Kavjaradze	(Armenia) Slavik Galstyan	(Hungary) Erik Torba
63 kg	(Georgia (country)) Levani Kavjaradze	(Armenia) Slavik Galstyan	(Turkey) Abdullah Toprak
67 kg	(Russia) Alen Mirzoian	(Serbia) Sebastian Nađ	(Ukraine) Artur Politaiev
67 kg	(Russia) Alen Mirzoian	(Serbia) Sebastian Nađ	(Belarus) Aliaksandr Liavonchyk
72 kg	(Georgia (country)) Ramaz Zoidze	(Russia) Magomed Yarbilov	(Turkey) Cengiz Arslan
72 kg	(Georgia (country)) Ramaz Zoidze	(Russia) Magomed Yarbilov	(Bulgaria) Stoyan Kubatov
77 kg	(Russia) Islam Opiev	(Turkey) Serkan Akkoyun	(Georgia (country)) Beka Mamukashvili
77 kg	(Russia) Islam Opiev	(Turkey) Serkan Akkoyun	(Hungary) Tamás Lévai
82 kg	(Hungary) Zoltán Lévai	(Russia) Vaag Margarian	(Turkey) Hasan Basri Yıldırım
82 kg	(Hungary) Zoltán Lévai	(Russia) Vaag Margarian	(Belarus) Stanislau Shafarenka
87 kg	(Georgia (country)) Gurami Khetsuriani	(Russia) Gazi Khalilov	(Croatia) Ivan Huklek
87 kg	(Georgia (country)) Gurami Khetsuriani	(Russia) Gazi Khalilov	(Turkey) Ali Cengiz
97 kg	(Finland) Arvi Savolainen	(Georgia (country)) Giorgi Melia	(Turkey) İbrahim Tığcı
97 kg	(Finland) Arvi Savolainen	(Georgia (country)) Giorgi Melia	(Ukraine) Vladen Kozliuk
130 kg	(Georgia (country)) Zviadi Pataridze	(Romania) Lenard Berei	(Turkey) Osman Yıldırım
130 kg	(Georgia (country)) Zviadi Pataridze	(Romania) Lenard Berei	(Russia) Oleg Agakhanov

=== Women's freestyle ===
Event	Gold	Silver	Bronze
50 kg	(Ukraine) Oksana Livach	(Russia) Nadezhda Sokolova	(Belarus) Kseniya Stankevich
50 kg	(Ukraine) Oksana Livach	(Russia) Nadezhda Sokolova	(Bulgaria) Miglena Selishka
53 kg	(Germany) Annika Wendle	(Ukraine) Khrystyna Bereza	(Turkey) Zeynep Yetgil
53 kg	(Germany) Annika Wendle	(Ukraine) Khrystyna Bereza	(Romania) Suzanna Seicariu
55 kg	(Russia) Viktoriia Vaulina	(Turkey) Eda Tekin	(Romania) Andreea Ana
55 kg	(Russia) Viktoriia Vaulina	(Turkey) Eda Tekin	(Bulgaria) Sezen Belberova
57 kg	(Hungary) Ramona Galambos	(Ukraine) Alina Akobiia	(Turkey) Elif Yanık
59 kg	(Moldova) Anastasia Nichita	(Ukraine) Anhelina Lysak	(Russia) Zelfira Sadraddinova
59 kg	(Moldova) Anastasia Nichita	(Ukraine) Anhelina Lysak	(Sweden) Emma Margareta Johansson
62 kg	(Ukraine) Ilona Prokopevniuk	(Germany) Luzie Manzke	(Russia) Daria Bobrulko
65 kg	(Russia) Maria Kuznetsova	(Romania) Kriszta Incze	(France) Pauline Lecarpentier
65 kg	(Russia) Maria Kuznetsova	(Romania) Kriszta Incze	(Hungary) Noémi Szabados
68 kg	(Poland) Natalia Strzalka	(Russia) Khanum Velieva	(Ukraine) Alina Levytska
72 kg	(Belarus) Anastasiya Zimiankova	(Russia) Evgeniia Zakharchenko	(Ukraine) Yelyzaveta Saidakova
76 kg	(Russia) Daria Shisterova	(Turkey) Ayşegül Özbege	(United Kingdom) Georgina Nelthorpe
76 kg	(Russia) Daria Shisterova	(Turkey) Ayşegül Özbege	(Romania) Diana Vlasceanu
