= Kurban Shiraev =

Russian freestyle wrestler

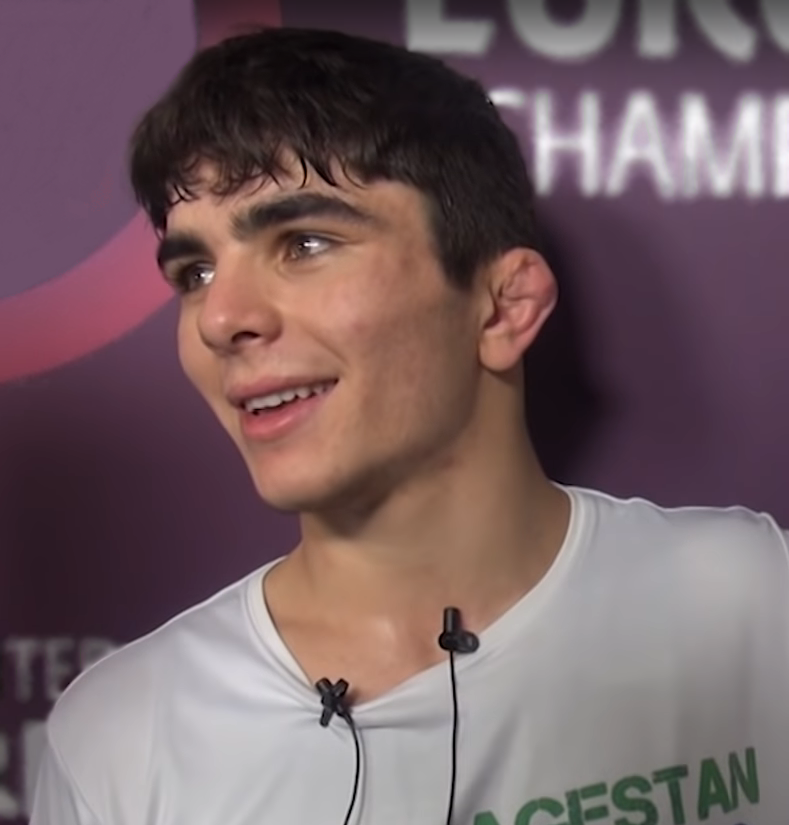
- Kurban Shiraev (2020)

Personal information
- Native name: Курбан Алиевич Шираев
- Born: Kurban Alievich Shiraev; 28 March 1999 (age 27) Burtunay, Kazbekovsky District, Dagestan, Russia
- Height: 172 cm (5 ft 8 in)
- Weight: 70 kg (154 lb)

Sport
- Country: Russia
- Sport: Amateur wrestling
- Weight class: 65-70kg
- Event: Freestyle
- Team: Sh. Umakhanova
- Coached by: Mahmud Magomedov; Dagir Aliyev

Achievements and titles
- Regional finals: (gold) (2020)
Medal record
Men's freestyle wrestling
Representing Russia
European Championships
Gold medal – first place	2020 Rome	65 kg
World Juniors Championships
Silver medal – second place	2019 Tallinn	65 kg
Representing Dagestan
All-Russian Spartakiad
Gold medal – first place	2022 Kazan	70 kg
Russian National Championships
Silver medal – second place	2024 Novoivanovskoye	70 kg
Bronze medal – third place	2023 Kaspiysk	70 kg
Bronze medal – third place	2022 Kyzyl	70 kg
Bronze medal – third place	2021 Ulan-Ude	65 kg
Bronze medal – third place	2020 Naro-Fominsk	70 kg
Golden Grand Prix Ivan Yarygin
Gold medal – first place	2021 Krasnoyarsk	70 kg
Gold medal – first place	2020 Krasnoyarsk	65 kg
Bronze medal – third place	2023 Krasnoyarsk	70 kg
Bronze medal – third place	2022 Krasnoyarsk	70 kg
Poddubny Wrestling League
Bronze medal – third place	2022 Moscow	70 kg

Kurban Alievich Shiraev (born 28 March 1999) is a Russian freestyle wrestler who competes at 65 and 70 kilograms. The 2020 European Continental champion, Shiraev is a two–time Ivan Yarygin Golden Grand Prix gold medalist (2020 and 2021) and a two–time Russian National Championship medalist (2020 and 2021).

== Career ==
Shiraev's first international appearance took place in Subotica, where he competed at the 2015 Cadet European Championships in the 42 kilograms division. He placed fifteenth at the tournament and took a long break that lasted until late 2018. Despite being eligible to compete at the junior level, he made his return at the '18 Intercontinental Cup as a senior. He earned a bronze medal and so he did at the 2019's Ali Aliev Tournament and Ugra Cup, also adding a silver medal from the '19 Junior World Championships and the '18 and 19's Alans Tournament. All of his senior level losses from 2018 to 2019 came from prestigious wrestlers, such as Soslan Ramonov ('16 Olympic Gold Medalist), Aleksandr Bogomoev ('15 European Games champion), Bajrang Punia ('18 Asian Games champion) and Ismail Musukaev ('15 Russian National runner-up).

In January 2020, he competed at the Ivan Yarygin Golden Grand Prix, where he went on to defeat multiple opponents on his way to the finale, most notably Nachyn Kuular ('17 U23 World Champion). In the finals, he avenged a loss from 2019 by upsetting former World and Olympic champion Soslan Ramonov and winning the championship. He then competed at the European Championships, where he defeated four opponents to win the European title at 65 kilograms.

He came back on 17 October 2020 at the Russian Nationals, in where he placed third. After opening up with two pins, he was dominantly defeated by returning National and World Champion David Baev in the quarterfinals. He was able to earn the bronze medal after defeating two more opponents.

After competing at the WLR Pro League on 25 January 2021 and losing once again to David Baev, Shiraev moved down to 65 kilos and placed third at the Russian National tournament.

== Major results ==
Year	Tournament	Venue	Result	Event
2018	Intercontinental Cup	Khasavyurt, Russia	3rd	Freestyle 65 kg
2018	Alans Tournament	Vladikavkas, Russia	2nd	Freestyle 65 kg
2019	Ali Aliev Tournament	Kaspiysk, Russia	3rd	Freestyle 65 kg
2019	Prix of Vladimir Semenov "Ugra Cup"	Nefteyugansk, Russia	3rd	Freestyle 65 kg
2019	Alans Tournament	Vladikavkas, Russia	2nd	Freestyle 65 kg
2020	Ivan Yarygin Golden Grand Prix	Krasnoyarsk, Russia	1st	Freestyle 65 kg
2020	European Championships	Rome, Italy	1st	Freestyle 65 kg
2020	Russian National Championships	Naro-Fominsk, Russia	3rd	Freestyle 70 kg
2021	Russian National Championships	Ulan-Ude, Russia	3rd	Freestyle 65 kg
2021	Ivan Yarygin Golden Grand Prix	Krasnoyarsk, Russia	1st	Freestyle 70 kg

== Freestyle record ==
Senior Freestyle Matches
Res.	Record	Opponent	Score	Date	Event	Location
2021 Ivan Yarygin Golden Grand Prix (gold) at 70 kg
Win	40–8	(Russia) Victor Rassadin	8–1	27–28 May 2021	Golden Grand Prix Ivan Yarygin 2021	Krasnoyarsk, Russia
Win	39–8	(Russia) Abdula Akhmedov	Fall	27–28 May 2021	Golden Grand Prix Ivan Yarygin 2021	Krasnoyarsk, Russia
Win	38–8	(Russia) David Baev	8–7	27–28 May 2021	Golden Grand Prix Ivan Yarygin 2021	Krasnoyarsk, Russia
Win	37–8	(Russia) Abdulkerim Abdulaev	7–0	27–28 May 2021	Golden Grand Prix Ivan Yarygin 2021	Krasnoyarsk, Russia
Win	36–8	(Russia) Buianto Banzaraktsaev	TF 11–0	27–28 May 2021	Golden Grand Prix Ivan Yarygin 2021	Krasnoyarsk, Russia
2021 Russian Nationals (bronze) at 65 kg
Win	35–8	(Russia) Gadzhimurad Omarov	3–0	13–14 March 2021	2021 Russian National Freestyle Wrestling Championships	Ulan-Ude, Russia
Loss	34–8	(Dagestan) Zagir Shakhiev	3–6	13–14 March 2021	2021 Russian National Freestyle Wrestling Championships	Ulan-Ude, Russia
Win	34–7	(Chechnya) Akhmed Chakaev	3–0	13–14 March 2021	2021 Russian National Freestyle Wrestling Championships	Ulan-Ude, Russia
Win	33–7	(Russia) Saiyn Kazyryk	8–0	13–14 March 2021	2021 Russian National Freestyle Wrestling Championships	Ulan-Ude, Russia
Win	32–7	(Chechnya) Muslim Sadulaev	8–1	13–14 March 2021	2021 Russian National Freestyle Wrestling Championships	Ulan-Ude, Russia
WLR Pro League I DNP at 70 kg
Loss	31–7	(Russia) David Baev	4–6	25 January 2021	WLR Pro League I	Russia
2020 Russian Nationals (bronze) at 70 kg
Win	31-6	(Tuva) Arbak Sat	6-0	17 October 2020	2020 Russian National Freestyle Wrestling Championships	Naro-Fominsk, Russia
Win	30-6	(Russia)	4-1	17 October 2020	2020 Russian National Freestyle Wrestling Championships	Naro-Fominsk, Russia
Loss	29-6	(Khanty-Mansi Autonomous Okrug) David Baev	0-8	17 October 2020	2020 Russian National Freestyle Wrestling Championships	Naro-Fominsk, Russia
Win	29-5	(Tatarstan) Ildus Giniyatullin	Fall	17 October 2020	2020 Russian National Freestyle Wrestling Championships	Naro-Fominsk, Russia
Win	28-5	(Buryatia) Aleksey Borovitsky	Fall	17 October 2020	2020 Russian National Freestyle Wrestling Championships	Naro-Fominsk, Russia
2020 European Championship (gold) at 65 kg
Win	27-5	(Belarus) Niurgun Skriabin	5-0	10–16 February 2020	2020 European Wrestling Championships	Rome, Italy
Win	26-5	(Ukraine) Erik Arushanian	9-2	10–16 February 2020	2020 European Wrestling Championships	Rome, Italy
Win	25-5	(Germany) Niklas Dorn	6-3	10–16 February 2020	2020 European Wrestling Championships	Rome, Italy
Win	24-5	(France) Marwane Yezza	TF 10-0	10–16 February 2020	2020 European Wrestling Championships	Rome, Italy
2020 Ivan Yarygin Grand Prix (gold) at 65 kg
Win	23-5	(Russia) Soslan Ramonov	4-2	23–26 January 2020	2020 Ivan Yarygin Golden Grand Prix	Krasnoyarsk, Russia
Win	22-5	(Russia) Nachyn Kuular	5-1	23–26 January 2020	2020 Ivan Yarygin Golden Grand Prix	Krasnoyarsk, Russia
Win	21-5	(Russia) Artur Badtiev	2-2	23–26 January 2020	2020 Ivan Yarygin Golden Grand Prix	Krasnoyarsk, Russia
Win	20-5	(Moldova) Maxim Saculțan	3-1	23–26 January 2020	2020 Ivan Yarygin Golden Grand Prix	Krasnoyarsk, Russia
Win	19-5	(Kazakhstan) Rifat Saibotalov	3-1	23–26 January 2020	2020 Ivan Yarygin Golden Grand Prix	Krasnoyarsk, Russia
Win	18-5	(Mongolia) Nyamdorj Battulga	8-1	23–26 January 2020	2020 Ivan Yarygin Golden Grand Prix	Krasnoyarsk, Russia
2019 Alans International (silver) at 65 kg
Loss	17-5	(Russia) Soslan Ramonov	0-3	7–8 December 2019	2019 Alans International Tournament	Vladikavkaz, Russia
Win	17-4	(Russia) Saiyn Kazyryk	TF 10-0	7–8 December 2019	2019 Alans International Tournament	Vladikavkaz, Russia
Win	16-4	(Iran) Amirmohammad Babak Yazdanicherati	TF 10-0	7–8 December 2019	2019 Alans International Tournament	Vladikavkaz, Russia
Win	15-4	(Russia) Batoev Bulat	TF 11-1	7–8 December 2019	2019 Alans International Tournament	Vladikavkaz, Russia
Win	14-4	(Russia) Shamil Guseinov	3-0	7–8 December 2019	2019 Alans International Tournament	Vladikavkaz, Russia
2019 Ugra Cup (bronze) at 65 kg
Win	13-4	(Russia) Ashamaz Kardanov	9-4	24–28 October 2019	2019 Prix of Vladimir Semenov "Ugra Cup"	Nefteyugansk, Russia
Win	12-4	(Kazakhstan) Sanzhar Doszhanov	Fall	24–28 October 2019	2019 Prix of Vladimir Semenov "Ugra Cup"	Nefteyugansk, Russia
Loss	11-4	(Russia) Aleksandr Bogomoev	1-4	24–28 October 2019	2019 Prix of Vladimir Semenov "Ugra Cup"	Nefteyugansk, Russia
Win	11-3	(Russia) Savr Shalburov	TF 11-0	24–28 October 2019	2019 Prix of Vladimir Semenov "Ugra Cup"	Nefteyugansk, Russia
2019 Ali Aliev (bronze) at 65 kg
Win	10-3	(Russia) Islam Dudaev	6-6	1–3 May 2019	2019 Ali Aliev Tournament	Kaspiysk, Russia
Win	9-3	(Kazakhstan) Meirzhan Ashirov	1-2	1–3 May 2019	2019 Ali Aliev Tournament	Kaspiysk, Russia
Loss	8-3	(India) Bajrang Punia	0-4	1–3 May 2019	2019 Ali Aliev Tournament	Kaspiysk, Russia
Win	8-2	(Russia) Muslimbek Abdurashidov	4-0	1–3 May 2019	2019 Ali Aliev Tournament	Kaspiysk, Russia
2018 Alans International (silver) at 65 kg
Loss	7-2	(Russia) Muslim Sadulaev	4-8	7–9 December 2018	2018 Alans International Tournament	Vladikavkaz, Russia
Win	7-1	(Russia) Artur Badtiev	3-0	7–9 December 2018	2018 Alans International Tournament	Vladikavkaz, Russia
Win	6-1	(Russia) Nachyn Kuular	6-1	7–9 December 2018	2018 Alans International Tournament	Vladikavkaz, Russia
Win	5-1	(Russia) Viktor Rassadin	Fall	7–9 December 2018	2018 Alans International Tournament	Vladikavkaz, Russia
Win	4-1	(Belarus) Viktor Serada	TF 13-2	7–9 December 2018	2018 Alans International Tournament	Vladikavkaz, Russia
2018 Continental Cup (bronze) at 65 kg
Win	3-1	(Russia) Biysultan Arslanov	Fall	15–19 November 2018	2018 Intercontinental Wrestling Cup	Khasavyurt, Russia
Loss	2-1	(Russia) Ismail Musukaev	1-2	15–19 November 2018	2018 Intercontinental Wrestling Cup	Khasavyurt, Russia
Win	2-0	(Russia) Murshid Mutalimov	6-3	15–19 November 2018	2018 Intercontinental Wrestling Cup	Khasavyurt, Russia
Win	1-0	(Russia) Rustam Gaimasov	Fall	15–19 November 2018	2018 Intercontinental Wrestling Cup	Khasavyurt, Russia
