= 2021 Russian National Freestyle Wrestling Championships =

2021 Russian Nationals
- Host city: Ulan-Ude, Buryatia, Russia
- Dates: March 11–14
- Stadium: Sport complex of Buryatia Republic

Champions
- Freestyle: Dagestan

The Russian National Freestyle Wrestling Championships 2021 (also known as the Russian Nationals 2021) was held in Ulan-Ude, Buryatia by the Russian Wrestling Federation at the Sport complex of Buryatia Republic between 11 March to 14 March 2021.

== Medal table ==
Rank	Nation	Gold	Silver	Bronze	Total
1	Dagestan	4	5	8	17
2	(North Ossetia–Alania) North Ossetia-Alania	1	2	7	10
3	(Republic of Crimea (Russia)) Republic of Crimea	1	0	1	2
4	Chechnya	1	0	0	1
4	Chuvashia	1	0	0	1
4	Khanty-Mansi Autonomous Okrug	1	0	0	1
4	Krasnoyarsk Krai	1	0	0	1
8	Buryatia	0	1	2	3
9	Kabardino-Balkaria	0	1	0	1
9	Tuva	0	1	0	1
11	Leningrad Oblast	0	0	2	2
Totals (11 entries)		10	10	20	40

== Men's freestyle ==
Event	Gold	Silver	Bronze
57 kg	(Dagestan) Zaur Uguev	(Tuva) Nachyn Mongush	(Dagestan) Abubakar Mutaliev
57 kg	(Dagestan) Zaur Uguev	(Tuva) Nachyn Mongush	(North Ossetia–Alania) Azamat Tuskaev
61 kg	(Dagestan) Abasgadzhi Magomedov	(Dagestan) Muslim Mekhtikhanov	(North Ossetia–Alania) Chermen Tavitov
61 kg	(Dagestan) Abasgadzhi Magomedov	(Dagestan) Muslim Mekhtikhanov	(Buryatia) Aldar Balzhinimaev
65 kg	(Dagestan) Gadzhimurad Rashidov	(Dagestan) Zagir Shakhiev	(Dagestan) Kurban Shiraev
65 kg	(Dagestan) Gadzhimurad Rashidov	(Dagestan) Zagir Shakhiev	(Dagestan) Abdulmazhid Kudiev
70 kg	(Krasnoyarsk Krai) Israil Kasumov	(Buryatia) Yevgeny Zherbaev	(North Ossetia–Alania) Chermen Valiev
70 kg	(Krasnoyarsk Krai) Israil Kasumov	(Buryatia) Yevgeny Zherbaev	(Leningrad Oblast) Abdula Akhmedov
74 kg	(North Ossetia–Alania) Zaurbek Sidakov	(Dagestan) Razambek Zhamalov	(Dagestan) Magomed Kurbanaliev
74 kg	(North Ossetia–Alania) Zaurbek Sidakov	(Dagestan) Razambek Zhamalov	(Dagestan) Magomedrasul Gazimagomedov
79 kg	(Republic of Crimea (Russia)) Malik Shavaev	(Dagestan) Akhmed Usmanov	(Dagestan) Gadzhi Nabiev
79 kg	(Republic of Crimea (Russia)) Malik Shavaev	(Dagestan) Akhmed Usmanov	(North Ossetia–Alania) Radik Valiev
86 kg	(North Ossetia–Alania) Artur Naifonov	(Dagestan) Dauren Kurugliev	(Dagestan) Magomed Ramazanov
86 kg	(North Ossetia–Alania) Artur Naifonov	(Dagestan) Dauren Kurugliev	(Dagestan) Akhmed Gadzhimagomedov
92 kg	(Dagestan) Magomed Kurbanov	(Kabardino-Balkaria) Anzor Urishev	(North Ossetia–Alania) Soslan Ktsoev
92 kg	(Dagestan) Magomed Kurbanov	(Kabardino-Balkaria) Anzor Urishev	(Republic of Crimea (Russia)) Azamat Zakuev
97 kg	(Chechnya) Alikhan Zhabrailov	(North Ossetia–Alania) Aslanbek Sotiev	(North Ossetia–Alania) Znaur Kotsiev
97 kg	(Chechnya) Alikhan Zhabrailov	(North Ossetia–Alania) Aslanbek Sotiev	(North Ossetia–Alania) Khokh Khugaev
125 kg	(North Ossetia–Alania) Sergey Kozyrev	(North Ossetia–Alania) Atsamaz Tebloev	(Buryatia) Baldan Tsyzhipov
125 kg	(North Ossetia–Alania) Sergey Kozyrev	(North Ossetia–Alania) Atsamaz Tebloev	(Leningrad Oblast) Anzor Khizriev

== See also ==
- 2020 Russian National Freestyle Wrestling Championships
- 2019 Russian National Freestyle Wrestling Championships
- 2018 Russian National Freestyle Wrestling Championships
- 2017 Russian National Freestyle Wrestling Championships
- Soviet and Russian results in men's freestyle wrestling
