= 2020 Russian National Freestyle Wrestling Championships =

2020 Russian Nationals
- Host city: (Moscow Oblast) Naro-Fominsk, Moscow oblast, Russia
- Dates: October 15–18
- Stadium: Naro-Fominsk ice place arena

Champions
- Freestyle: Dagestan

The Russian National Freestyle Wrestling Championships 2020 (also known as the Russian Nationals 2020) was held in Naro-Fominsk, Moscow Oblast by the Russian Wrestling Federation at the Naro-Fominsk ice place arena between 15 October to 18 October 2020.

== Medal table ==
Rank	Nation	Gold	Silver	Bronze	Total
1	Dagestan	6	3	8	17
2	(North Ossetia–Alania) North Ossetia-Alania	2	2	5	9
3	Chechnya	2	1	1	4
4	Khanty-Mansi Autonomous Okrug	0	2	0	2
5	(Bryansk Oblast) Bryansk oblast	0	1	0	1
5	(Moscow Oblast) Moscow oblast	0	1	0	1
7	Krasnoyarsk Krai	0	0	2	2
8	Buryatia	0	0	1	1
8	Kabardino-Balkaria	0	0	1	1
8	Krasnodar Krai	0	0	1	1
8	Leningrad Oblast	0	0	1	1
Totals (11 entries)		10	10	20	40

== Men's freestyle ==
Event	Gold	Silver	Bronze
57 kg	(Dagestan) Zaur Uguev	(Moscow Oblast) Azamat Tuskaev	(Dagestan) Akhmed Idrisov
57 kg	(Dagestan) Zaur Uguev	(Moscow Oblast) Azamat Tuskaev	(Chechnya) Muslim Sadulaev
61 kg	(Dagestan) Abasgadzhi Magomedov	(Dagestan) Ramazan Ferzaliev	(Dagestan) Ibragim Abdurakhmanov
61 kg	(Dagestan) Abasgadzhi Magomedov	(Dagestan) Ramazan Ferzaliev	(Buryatia) Zhargal Damdinov
65 kg	(Dagestan) Gadzhimurad Rashidov	(Chechnya) Akhmed Chakaev	(North Ossetia–Alania) Alan Gogaev
65 kg	(Dagestan) Gadzhimurad Rashidov	(Chechnya) Akhmed Chakaev	(Dagestan) Zagir Shakhiev
70 kg	(North Ossetia–Alania) Chermen Valiev	(Khanty-Mansi Autonomous Okrug) David Baev	(Dagestan) Kurban Shiraev
70 kg	(North Ossetia–Alania) Chermen Valiev	(Khanty-Mansi Autonomous Okrug) David Baev	(Krasnoyarsk Krai) Ruslan Zhendaev
74 kg	(Chechnya) Razambek Zhamalov	(North Ossetia–Alania) Khetag Tsabolov	(North Ossetia–Alania) Zaurbek Sidakov
74 kg	(Chechnya) Razambek Zhamalov	(North Ossetia–Alania) Khetag Tsabolov	(Krasnodar Krai) Timur Bizhoev
79 kg	(Dagestan) Akhmed Usmanov	(Bryansk Oblast) Gadzhimurad Alikhmaev	(Dagestan) Gadzhi Nabiev
79 kg	(Dagestan) Akhmed Usmanov	(Bryansk Oblast) Gadzhimurad Alikhmaev	(Dagestan) Amanula Gadzhimagomedov
86 kg	(Dagestan) Dauren Kurugliev	(Khanty-Mansi Autonomous Okrug) Artur Naifonov	(Dagestan) Magomed Ramazanov
86 kg	(Dagestan) Dauren Kurugliev	(Khanty-Mansi Autonomous Okrug) Artur Naifonov	(Dagestan) Arsen-Ali Musalaliev
92 kg	(Chechnya) Alikhan Zhabrailov	(Dagestan) Magomed Kurbanov	(North Ossetia–Alania) Batyrbek Tsakulov
92 kg	(Chechnya) Alikhan Zhabrailov	(Dagestan) Magomed Kurbanov	(Kabardino-Balkaria) Anzor Urishev
97 kg	(Dagestan) Abdulrashid Sadulaev	(North Ossetia–Alania) Aslanbek Sotiev	(North Ossetia–Alania) Aslanbek Gazzaev
97 kg	(Dagestan) Abdulrashid Sadulaev	(North Ossetia–Alania) Aslanbek Sotiev	(Krasnoyarsk Krai) Erick Dzhioev
125 kg	(North Ossetia–Alania) Alan Khugaev	(Dagestan) Shamil Sharipov	(Leningrad Oblast) Anzor Khizriev
125 kg	(North Ossetia–Alania) Alan Khugaev	(Dagestan) Shamil Sharipov	(North Ossetia–Alania) Vitaly Goloev

== See also ==
- 2019 Russian National Freestyle Wrestling Championships
- 2018 Russian National Freestyle Wrestling Championships
- 2017 Russian National Freestyle Wrestling Championships
- 2016 Russian National Freestyle Wrestling Championships
- Soviet and Russian results in men's freestyle wrestling
