= Petrakovskoye =

Petrakovskoye Петраковское
- Selo
- Location within Republic of Dagestan Location within Russia
- Coordinates: 43°15′N 46°38′E
- Country: Russia
- Region: Republic of Dagestan
- District: Khasavyurtovsky District
- Time zone: UTC+3:00

Petrakovskoye (Russian: Петраковское) is a rural locality (a selo) in Mogilevsky Selsoviet, Khasavyurtovsky District, Republic of Dagestan, Russia. 4,467 (2021 census); 1,984 (2002 census); 958 (1989 Soviet census). There are 28 streets.

== Geography ==
Petrakovskoye is located 6 km east of Khasavyurt (the district's administrative centre) by road. Mogilyovskoye is the nearest rural locality.
