= Mogilyovskoye =

Mogilyovskoye Могилёвское
- Selo
- Location within Republic of Dagestan Location within Russia
- Coordinates: 43°15′N 46°37′E
- Country: Russia
- Region: Republic of Dagestan
- District: Khasavyurtovsky District
- Time zone: UTC+3:00

Mogilyovskoye

Mogilyovskoye (Russian: Могилёвское) is a rural locality (a selo) and the administrative centre of Mogilevsky Selsoviet, Khasavyurtovsky District, Republic of Dagestan, Russia. 2,953 (2021 census); 1,429 (2002 census); 1,366 (1989 Soviet census). There are 33 streets.

== Geography ==
Mogilyovskoye is located 6 km northeast of Khasavyurt (the district's administrative centre) by road. Petrakovskoye is the nearest rural locality.
