= Magomedrasul Gazimagomedov =

Russian freestyle wrestler

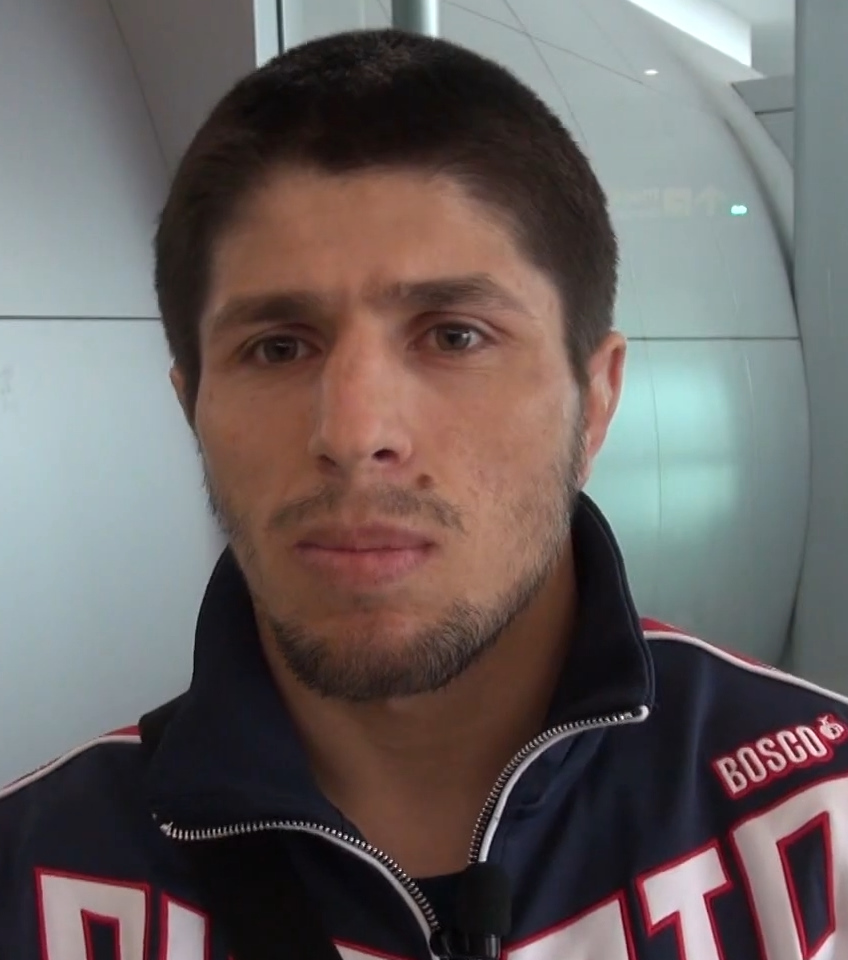
- Gazimagomedov in 2019

Personal information
- Full name: Magomedrasul Mukhtarovich Gazimagomedov
- Nationality: Avar
- Born: 8 April 1991 (age 35) Tindi village, Dagestan, Russia
- Home town: Stavropol, Russia; Makhachkala, Russia
- Height: 1.78 m (5 ft 10 in)
- Website: Official VK Profile; Official Instagram Profile

Sport
- Country: Russia
- Sport: Wrestling
- Weight class: 70 kg (150 lb); 74 kg (163 lb)
- Rank: Number one in the ranking UWW in October 2015, Grand Master of Sports
- Event: Freestyle
- Club: SC Bazarganova
- Coached by: Eldar Nazhmudinov, Ferzulah Islamov, Khaibula Khaibulaev
Medal record
Men's freestyle wrestling
Representing Russia
World Championships
Gold medal – first place	2015 Las Vegas	70 kg
Gold medal – first place	2018 Budapest	70 kg
European Games
Gold medal – first place	2015 Baku	70 kg
European Championships
Silver medal – second place	2020 Rome	74 kg
Bronze medal – third place	2019 Bucharest	70 kg
Russian Championships
Gold medal – first place	2015 Kaspiisk	70 kg
Gold medal – first place	2018 Odinzevo	70 kg
Bronze medal – third place	2014 Yakutsk	70 kg
Bronze medal – third place	2019 Sochi	74 kg
Bronze medal – third place	2021 Ulan-Ude	74 kg
Golden Grand Prix Ivan Yarygin
Gold medal – first place	Krasnoyarsk 2019	70 kg
Silver medal – second place	Krasnoyarsk 2018	70 kg
Bronze medal – third place	2022 Krasnoyarsk	74 kg
Ramzan Kadyrov and Adlan Varayev Cup
Gold medal – first place	2014 Grozny	70 kg
Alexander Medved International
Gold medal – first place	2015 Minsk	70 kg
World Wrestling Clubs Cup
Gold medal – first place	2015 Tehran	70 kg

Magomedrasul Mukhtarovich Gazimagomedov (Russian: Магомедрасул Мухтарович Газимагомедов; born 8 April 1991) is a Russian freestyle wrestler. He is two-time World Champion and a Grand Master of Sports in freestyle wrestling.

Nationally, Gazimagomedov won the Russian National Freestyle Wrestling Championships 2015. In the quarterfinals match he beat World Champion Khetag Tsabolov of North Ossetia–Alania. He defeated Israil Kasumov of Krasnoyarsk Krai in the final.

At the 2015 European Games, Gazimagomedov won gold in the men's freestyle 70 kg category. He won gold at the 2015 World Wrestling Championships in the 70 kg event, beating Iranian Hassan Yazdani. After knee injury he returned to wrestling at the Golden Grand Prix Ivan Yarygin 2018, in the final match losing to Magomed Kurbanaliev in a close match.

In the pre-season he trains with MMA stars Rustam Khabilov and Khabib Nurmagomedov.
