= Magomed Kurbanaliev =

Russian wrestler (born 1992)

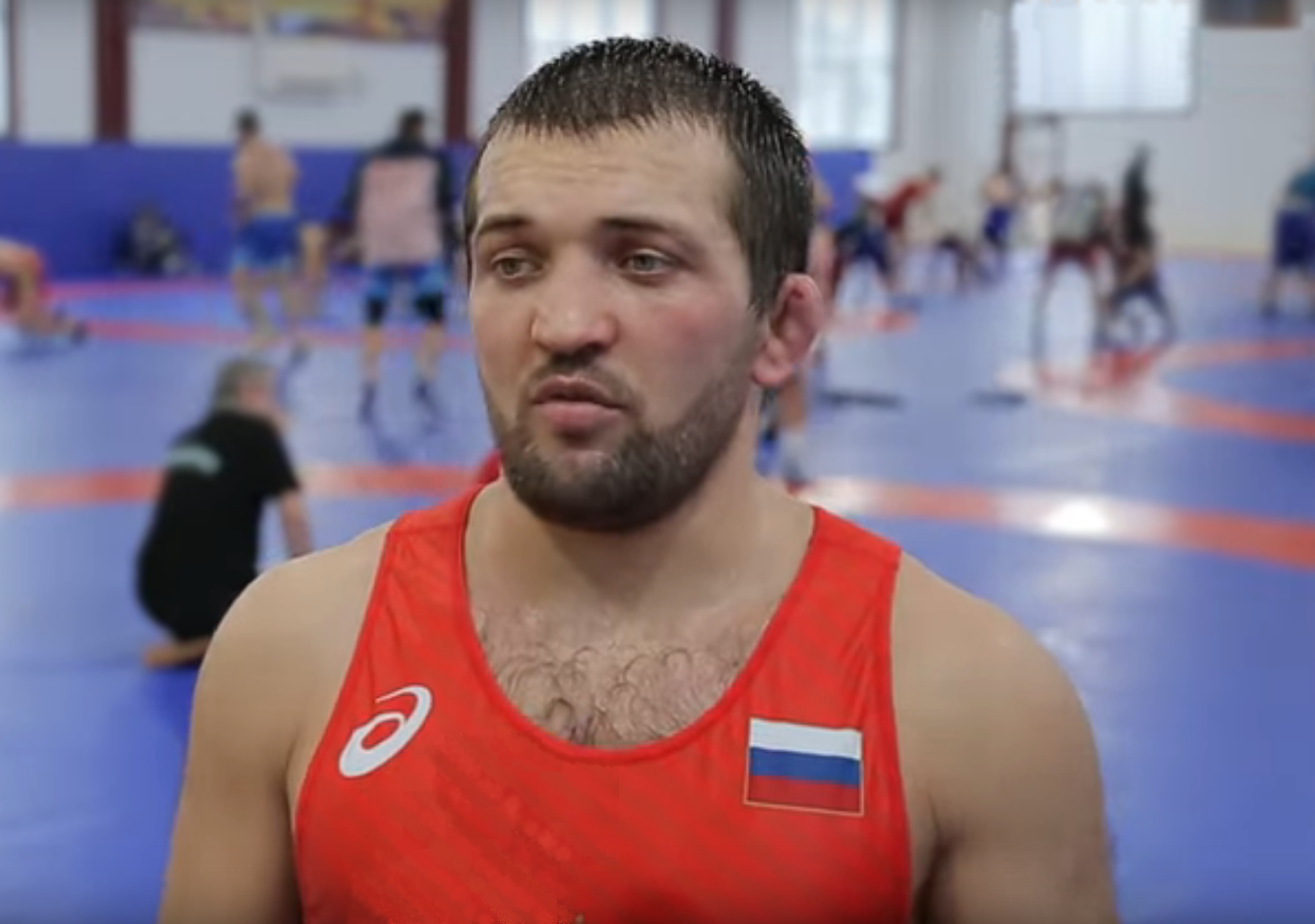
- Kurbanaliev in 2020

Personal information
- Full name: Magomed Magomedovich Kurbanaliev
- Born: August 6, 1992 (age 34) Bezta, Tsuntinsky District, Dagestan, Russia
- Height: 166 cm (5 ft 5 in)
- Weight: 70 kg (150 lb); 65 kg (143 lb)

Sport
- Country: Russia
- Sport: Sport wrestling
- Event: Freestyle
- Team: Shamil Umakhanov Wrestling Club
- Coached by: Shamil Rashidov, Saigidgpasha Umakhanov, Imanmurza Aliev
Medal record
Representing Russia
Men's Freestyle Wrestling
World Championships
Gold medal – first place	2016 Budapest	70 kg
Bronze medal – third place	2013 Budapest	66 kg
World Cup
Silver medal – second place	2016 Los Angeles	65 kg
European Championships
Gold medal – first place	2018 Kaspiysk	70 kg
Gold medal – first place	2014 Vantaa	65 kg
Summer Universiade
Gold medal – first place	2013 Kazan	66 kg
Russian National Championships
Gold medal – first place	2019 Sochi	74 kg
Gold medal – first place	2013 Krasnoyarsk	66 kg
Bronze medal – third place	2021 Ulan-Ude	74 kg
Bronze medal – third place	2018 Odinzevo	70 kg
Bronze medal – third place	2015 Kaspiisk	65 kg
Bronze medal – third place	2014 Yakutsk	65 kg
Golden Grand Prix Ivan Yarygin
Gold medal – first place	2018 Krasnoyarsk	70 kg
Gold medal – first place	2014 Krasnoyarsk	65 kg
Silver medal – second place	2016 Krasnoyarsk	65 kg
Bronze medal – third place	2020 Krasnoyarsk	74 kg
Bronze medal – third place	2019 Krasnoyarsk	74 kg
World Military Games
Gold medal – first place	2015 Mungyeong	70 kg
Military World Championships
Gold medal – first place	2016 Skopje	70 kg
Junior World Championships
Gold medal – first place	2012 Pattaya	66 kg

Magomed Magomedvich Kurbanaliev (Avar: КъурбангІалиев МухІамадил МухІамад; Russian: Магомед Магомедович Курбаналиев; born 6 August 1992) is a Russian former freestyle wrestler. He is 2016 World Freestyle Wrestling Champion in 70 kg. He competes in the 66 kg division and won the gold medal in the same division at the 2013 Summer Universiade defeating David Safaryan of Armenia. Also he won bronze at the 2013 World Wrestling Championships in Budapest. At the Golden Grand Prix Ivan Yarygin 2016 he resigned after in the final due to his knee injury. He went on winning the World Military Championships in 2016. Recently he won the Golden Grand Prix Ivan Yarygin 2018.
