= 2019 Golden Grand Prix Ivan Yarygin =

Ivan Yarygin 2019
- Host city: Krasnoyarsk, Russia
- Dates: January 24–28
- Stadium: Ivan Yarygin Sports Palace

Champions
- Freestyle: Dagestan
- Women: Russia

The XXX Golden Grand Prix Ivan Yarygin 2019, also known as Ivan Yarygin (Yariguin) 2019 is a United World Wrestling rankings freestyle wrestling international tournament, which was held in Krasnoyarsk, Russia between 24 and 27 of January 2019. It was held as the first of the ranking series of United World Wrestling.

== Medal overview ==
=== Medal table ===
Rank	Nation	Gold	Silver	Bronze	Total
1	Dagestan	6	2	4	12
2	Russia	3	5	5	13
3	Japan	3	3	0	6
4	United States	2	2	3	7
5	Mongolia	2	0	11	13
6	Chechnya	2	0	2	4
7	(North Ossetia–Alania) North Ossetia-Alania	1	1	1	3
8	Leningrad Oblast	1	0	0	1
9	Turkey	0	3	1	4
10	Belarus	0	2	0	2
11	Romania	0	1	0	1
11	Tuva	0	1	0	1
13	Bulgaria	0	0	1	1
13	Germany	0	0	1	1
13	Kazakhstan	0	0	1	1
13	Krasnoyarsk Krai	0	0	1	1
13	Norway	0	0	1	1
13	Sakha Republic	0	0	1	1
13	Uzbekistan	0	0	1	1
Totals (19 entries)		20	20	34	74

=== Men's freestyle ===
Event	Gold	Silver	Bronze
57 kg	(Chechnya) Muslim Sadulaev	(Dagestan) Abasgadzhi Magomedov	(United States) Thomas Gilman
57 kg	(Chechnya) Muslim Sadulaev	(Dagestan) Abasgadzhi Magomedov	(Mongolia) Narmandakhyn Nasanbuyan
61 kg	(Dagestan) Magomedrasul Idrisov	(Romania) Nikolai Okhlopkov	(Sakha Republic) Eduard Grigoriev
61 kg	(Dagestan) Magomedrasul Idrisov	(Romania) Nikolai Okhlopkov	(Dagestan) Ramazan Ferzaliev
65 kg	(Chechnya) Akhmed Chakaev	(Tuva) Nachyn Kuular	(Dagestan) Gadzhimurad Rashidov
65 kg	(Chechnya) Akhmed Chakaev	(Tuva) Nachyn Kuular	(Mongolia) Batmagnai Batchuluun
70 kg	(Dagestan) Magomedrasul Gazimagomedov	(Mongolia) Ganzorigiin Mandakhnaran	(Mongolia) Byambadorj Enkhbayar
70 kg	(Dagestan) Magomedrasul Gazimagomedov	(Mongolia) Ganzorigiin Mandakhnaran	(Chechnya) Razambek Zhamalov
74 kg	(North Ossetia–Alania) Zaurbek Sidakov	(Turkey) Yakup Gor	(Dagestan) Magomed Kurbanaliev
74 kg	(North Ossetia–Alania) Zaurbek Sidakov	(Turkey) Yakup Gor	(Dagestan) Azamat Nurykau
79 kg	(Dagestan) Akhmed Gadzhimagomedov	(Dagestan) Magomed Ramazanov	(United States) Alex Dieringer
86 kg	(Dagestan) Dauren Kurugliev	(Turkey) Fatih Erdin	(North Ossetia–Alania) Vladislav Valiev
86 kg	(Dagestan) Dauren Kurugliev	(Turkey) Fatih Erdin	(Mongolia) Orgodolyn Üitümen
92 kg	(Dagestan) Magomed Kurbanov	(North Ossetia–Alania) Batyrbek Tsakulov	(Mongolia) Ulziisaikhan Baasantsogt
97 kg	(Dagestan) Shamil Musaev	(Belarus) Aliaksandr Hushtyn	(Krasnoyarsk Krai) Igor Ovsyannikov
97 kg	(Dagestan) Shamil Musaev	(Belarus) Aliaksandr Hushtyn	(Turkey) Baki Sahin
125 kg	(Leningrad Oblast) Anzor Khizriev	(Turkey) Taha Akgul	(Chechnya) Zelimkhan Khizriev

=== Women's freestyle ===
Event	Gold	Silver	Bronze
50 kg	(Japan) Kika Kagata	(Russia) Anzhelika Vetoshkina	(United States) Victoria Anthony
50 kg	(Japan) Kika Kagata	(Russia) Anzhelika Vetoshkina	(Uzbekistan) Dauletbike Yakhshimuratova
53 kg	(United States) Sarah Hildebrandt	(Russia) Natalia Malysheva	(Russia) Leila Karymova
53 kg	(United States) Sarah Hildebrandt	(Russia) Natalia Malysheva	(Mongolia) Erdenechimegiin Sumiyaa
55 kg	(Russia) Victoria Vaulina	(Japan) Nao Taniyama	(Mongolia) Bat-Ochiryn Bolortuyaa
57 kg	(Mongolia) Sükheegiin Tserenchimed	(Russia) Olga Khoroshavtseva	(Bulgaria) Bilyana Dudova
57 kg	(Mongolia) Sükheegiin Tserenchimed	(Russia) Olga Khoroshavtseva	(Norway) Grace Bullen
59 kg	(Japan) Yuzuka Inagaki	(Russia) Svetlana Lipatova	(Mongolia) Altantsetsegiin Battsetseg
62 kg	(Russia) Anzhela Fomenko	(Russia) Anna Shcerbakova	(Russia) Uliana Tukurenova
65 kg	(Russia) Maria Kuznetsova	(Japan) Misuzu Enomoto	(Mongolia) Bolortungalag Zorigt
65 kg	(Russia) Maria Kuznetsova	(Japan) Misuzu Enomoto	(Russia) Yulia Prontsevich
68 kg	(Mongolia) Soronzonboldyn Battsetseg	(Mongolia) Davaanasan Enkh-Amar	(Russia) Khanum Velieva
68 kg	(Mongolia) Soronzonboldyn Battsetseg	(Mongolia) Davaanasan Enkh-Amar	(Mongolia) Delgermaa Enkhsaikhan
72 kg	(United States) Tamyra Mensah	(Japan) Yuka Kagami	(Mongolia) Ochirbatyn Nasanburmaa
72 kg	(United States) Tamyra Mensah	(Japan) Yuka Kagami	(Russia) Evgeniia Zakharchenko
76 kg	(Japan) Hiroe Suzuki	(Belarus) Vasilisa Marzaliuk	(Germany) Aline Focken
76 kg	(Japan) Hiroe Suzuki	(Belarus) Vasilisa Marzaliuk	(Kazakhstan) Elmira Syzdykova

== Participating nations ==
188 competitors from 18 nations participated.

- Belarus (3)
- Bulgaria (2)
- Cuba (5)
- China (11)
- Cuba (7)
- Germany (2)
- Hungary (1)
- Jordan (1)
- Japan (9)
- Kazakhstan (3)
- Mongolia (46)
- Norway (1)
- Romania (2)
- Russia (60)
- Turkmenistan (4)
- Turkey (6)
- United States (18)
- Uzbekistan (7)

== Ranking Series ==
Ranking Series Calendar 2019:

- 1st Ranking Series: 24–28 January, Russia, Krasnoyarsk ⇒ Golden Grand Prix Ivan Yarygin 2019 (FS, WW)
- 2nd Ranking Series: 9–10 February, Croatia, Zagreb ⇒ 2019 Grand Prix Zagreb Open (GR)
- 3rd Ranking Series: 23–24 February, Hungary, Győr ⇒ Hungarian Grand Prix - Polyák Imre Memorial (GR)
- 4th Ranking Series: 28 February-3 March, Bulgaria, Ruse ⇒ 2019 Dan Kolov & Nikola Petrov Tournament (FS, WW, GR)
- 5th Ranking Series: 23–25 May, Italy, Sassari ⇒ Matteo Pellicone Ranking Series 2019 (FS, WW, GR)
- 6th Ranking Series: 11–14 July, Turkey, Istanbul ⇒ 2019 Yasar Dogu Tournament (FS, WW)
- 7th Ranking Series: 28 February-3 March, Belarus, Minsk ⇒ 2019 Oleg Karavaev Tournament (GR)
