= 2019 Russian National Freestyle Wrestling Championships =

2019 Russian Nationals
- Host city: Sochi, Krasnodar Krai, Russia
- Dates: July 5–7
- Stadium: Iceberg Skating Palace

Champions
- Freestyle: Dagestan

The Russian National Freestyle Wrestling Championships 2019 (also known as the Russian Nationals 2019) was held in Sochi, Krasnodar Krai by the Russian Wrestling Federation at the Iceberg Skating Palace between 5 July to 7 July 2019.

All of the members of the European Games 2019 were released from Russian Nationals (Zaur Uguev, Akhmed Chakaev, Zaurbek Sidakov, Dauren Kurugliev, Abdulrashid Sadulaev and Anzor Khizriev). They faced Russian National champions for making World Team.

== Medal table ==
| Rank | Nation | Gold | Silver | Bronze | Total |
|---|---|---|---|---|---|
| 1 | Dagestan | 5 | 3 | 8 | 16 |
| 2 | (North Ossetia–Alania) North Ossetia-Alania | 3 | 3 | 4 | 10 |
| 3 | Chechnya | 1 | 2 | 2 | 5 |
| 4 | Khanty-Mansi Autonomous Okrug | 1 | 0 | 0 | 1 |
| 5 | Krasnoyarsk Krai | 0 | 1 | 0 | 1 |
| 5 | Tuva | 0 | 1 | 0 | 1 |
| 7 | Buryatia | 0 | 0 | 2 | 2 |
| 8 | Kabardino-Balkaria | 0 | 0 | 1 | 1 |
| 8 | Krasnodar Krai | 0 | 0 | 1 | 1 |
| 8 | Moscow Oblast | 0 | 0 | 1 | 1 |
| 8 | Sakha Republic | 0 | 0 | 1 | 1 |
| Totals (11 entries) | | 10 | 10 | 20 | 40 |

== Men's freestyle ==
| Event | Gold | Silver | Bronze |
|---|---|---|---|
| 57 kg | (Dagestan) Ramiz Gamzatov | (Chechnya) Muslim Sadulaev | (Sakha Republic) Mikhail Ivanov |
| 57 kg | (Dagestan) Ramiz Gamzatov | (Chechnya) Muslim Sadulaev | (Dagestan) Hassanhussein Badrudinov |
| 61 kg | (Dagestan) Magomedrasul Idrisov | (Dagestan) Ramazan Ferzaliev | (Dagestan) Dinislam Takhtarov |
| 61 kg | (Dagestan) Magomedrasul Idrisov | (Dagestan) Ramazan Ferzaliev | (Dagestan) Zelimkhan Abakarov |
| 65 kg | (Dagestan) Gadzhimurad Rashidov | (Tuva) Nachyn Kuular | (Dagestan) Murshid Mutalimov |
| 65 kg | (Dagestan) Gadzhimurad Rashidov | (Tuva) Nachyn Kuular | (Buryatia) Yuliyan Gergenov |
| 70 kg | (North Ossetia–Alania) David Baev | (Chechnya) Razambek Zhamalov | (North Ossetia–Alania) Chermen Valiev |
| 70 kg | (North Ossetia–Alania) David Baev | (Chechnya) Razambek Zhamalov | (Buryatia) Yevgeny Zherbaev |
| 74 kg | (Dagestan) Magomed Kurbanaliev | (North Ossetia–Alania) Khetag Tsabolov | (Dagestan) Magomedrasul Gazimagomedov |
| 74 kg | (Dagestan) Magomed Kurbanaliev | (North Ossetia–Alania) Khetag Tsabolov | (Krasnodar Krai) Timur Bizhoev |
| 79 kg | (Dagestan) Gadzhi Nabiev | (North Ossetia–Alania) Atsamaz Sanakoev | (North Ossetia–Alania) Kakhaber Khubezhty |
| 79 kg | (Dagestan) Gadzhi Nabiev | (North Ossetia–Alania) Atsamaz Sanakoev | (Chechnya) Khalid Yakhev |
| 86 kg | (Khanty-Mansi Autonomous Okrug) Artur Naifonov | (North Ossetia–Alania) Vladislav Valiev | (Dagestan) Arsen-Ali Musalaliev |
| 86 kg | (Khanty-Mansi Autonomous Okrug) Artur Naifonov | (North Ossetia–Alania) Vladislav Valiev | (Dagestan) Magomed Ramazanov |
| 92 kg | (Chechnya) Alikhan Zhabrailov | (Dagestan) Magomed Kurbanov | (Kabardino-Balkaria) Anzor Urishev |
| 92 kg | (Chechnya) Alikhan Zhabrailov | (Dagestan) Magomed Kurbanov | (North Ossetia–Alania) Batyrbek Tsakulov |
| 97 kg | (North Ossetia–Alania) Vladislav Baitcaev | (Krasnoyarsk Krai) Igor Ovsyannikov | (Dagestan) Shamil Musaev |
| 97 kg | (North Ossetia–Alania) Vladislav Baitcaev | (Krasnoyarsk Krai) Igor Ovsyannikov | (North Ossetia–Alania) Georgy Gogaev |
| 125 kg | (North Ossetia–Alania) Alan Khugaev | (Dagestan) Said Gamidov | (Moscow Oblast) Pavel Krivtsov |
| 125 kg | (North Ossetia–Alania) Alan Khugaev | (Dagestan) Said Gamidov | (Chechnya) Zelimkhan Khizriev |

== See also ==
- 2018 Russian National Freestyle Wrestling Championships
- 2017 Russian National Freestyle Wrestling Championships
- 2016 Russian National Freestyle Wrestling Championships
- 2015 Russian National Freestyle Wrestling Championships
- Soviet and Russian results in men's freestyle wrestling
