= 2018 Russian National Freestyle Wrestling Championships =

Russian National freestyle wrestling championships 2018

2018 Russian Nationals
- Host city: Odintsovo, Moscow Oblast, Russia
- Dates: August 3–5
- Stadium: Izmailovo volleyball sport complex (1050 seats)

Champions
- Freestyle: Dagestan

The Russian National Freestyle Wrestling Championships 2018 (also known as the Russian Nationals 2018) was held in Odintsovo, Moscow Oblast, Russia by the Russian Wrestling Federation at the Odintsovo Sport Complex from 3–5 August 2018.

== Medal overview ==
=== Medal table ===
Rank	Nation	Gold	Silver	Bronze	Total
1	Dagestan	6	0	7	13
2	(North Ossetia–Alania) North Ossetia-Alania	2	3	3	8
3	Chechnya	2	1	3	6
4	Kabardino-Balkaria	0	3	0	3
5	Tuva	0	2	1	3
6	Karachay-Cherkessia	0	1	0	1
7	Krasnoyarsk Krai	0	0	3	3
8	Buryatia	0	0	1	1
8	Krasnodar Krai	0	0	1	1
8	Sakha Republic	0	0	1	1
Totals (10 entries)		10	10	20	40

=== Men's freestyle ===
Event	Gold	Silver	Bronze
57 kg	(Dagestan) Zaur Uguev	(Tuva) Donduk-ool Khuresh-ool	(Chechnya) Muslim Sadulaev
57 kg	(Dagestan) Zaur Uguev	(Tuva) Donduk-ool Khuresh-ool	(Sakha Republic) Aryian Tyutrin
61 kg	(Dagestan) Magomedrasul Idrisov	(Kabardino-Balkaria) Ismail Musukaev	(Dagestan) Zelimkhan Abakarov
61 kg	(Dagestan) Magomedrasul Idrisov	(Kabardino-Balkaria) Ismail Musukaev	(Dagestan) Artem Gebekov
65 kg	(Chechnya) Akhmed Chakaev	(Chechnya) Bekkhan Goygereyev	(Tuva) Nachyn Kuular
65 kg	(Chechnya) Akhmed Chakaev	(Chechnya) Bekkhan Goygereyev	(Buryatia) Dasha Sharastepanov
70 kg	(Dagestan) Magomedrasul Gazimagomedov	(Tuva) Arbak Sat	(North Ossetia–Alania) David Baev
70 kg	(Dagestan) Magomedrasul Gazimagomedov	(Tuva) Arbak Sat	(Dagestan) Magomed Kurbanaliev
74 kg	(North Ossetia–Alania) Zaurbek Sidakov	(North Ossetia–Alania) Khetag Tsabolov	(Krasnodar Krai) Timur Bizhoev
74 kg	(North Ossetia–Alania) Zaurbek Sidakov	(North Ossetia–Alania) Khetag Tsabolov	(Krasnoyarsk Krai) Nikita Suchkov
79 kg	(Dagestan) Akhmed Gadzhimagomedov	(Karachay-Cherkessia) Khuseyn Suyunchev	(North Ossetia–Alania) Khakhaber Khubezhti
79 kg	(Dagestan) Akhmed Gadzhimagomedov	(Karachay-Cherkessia) Khuseyn Suyunchev	(Dagestan) Gadzhi Nabiev
86 kg	(Dagestan) Dauren Kurugliev	(North Ossetia–Alania) Artur Naifonov	(Chechnya) Zelimkhan Minkailov
86 kg	(Dagestan) Dauren Kurugliev	(North Ossetia–Alania) Artur Naifonov	(North Ossetia–Alania) Vladislav Valiev
92 kg	(North Ossetia–Alania) Batyrbek Tsakulov	(Kabardino-Balkaria) Anzor Urishev	(Krasnoyarsk Krai) Yuri Belonovski
92 kg	(North Ossetia–Alania) Batyrbek Tsakulov	(Kabardino-Balkaria) Anzor Urishev	(Chechnya) Alikhan Zhabrailov
97 kg	(Dagestan) Abdulrashid Sadulaev	(North Ossetia–Alania) Vladislav Baitcaev	(Dagestan) Zainulla Kurbanov
97 kg	(Dagestan) Abdulrashid Sadulaev	(North Ossetia–Alania) Vladislav Baitcaev	(Krasnoyarsk Krai) Igor Ovsyannikov
125 kg	(Chechnya) Anzor Khizriev	(Kabardino-Balkaria) Muradin Kushkhov	(Dagestan) Said Gamidov
125 kg	(Chechnya) Anzor Khizriev	(Kabardino-Balkaria) Muradin Kushkhov	(Dagestan) Magomedgadzhi Nurasulov

== See also ==
- 2017 Russian National Freestyle Wrestling Championships
- 2016 Russian National Freestyle Wrestling Championships
- 2015 Russian National Greco-Roman Wrestling Championships
- Soviet and Russian results in men's freestyle wrestling
