= 2021 World Wrestling Championships – Men's freestyle 79 kg =

Wrestling competitions

Men's freestyle 79 kg at the 2021 World Championships
- Venue: Nye Jordal Amfi
- Dates: 3–4 October 2021
- Competitors: 25 from 25 nations

Medalists
gold medal	Jordan Burroughs	United States
silver medal	Mohammad Nokhodi	Iran
bronze medal	Radik Valiev	RWF
bronze medal	Nika Kentchadze	Georgia

The men's freestyle 79 kilograms is a competition featured at the 2021 World Wrestling Championships, and was held in Oslo, Norway on 3 and 4 October.

This freestyle wrestling competition consists of a single-elimination tournament, with a repechage used to determine the winner of two bronze medals. The two finalists face off for gold and silver medals. Each wrestler who loses to one of the two finalists moves into the repechage, culminating in a pair of bronze medal matches featuring the semifinal losers each facing the remaining repechage opponent from their half of the bracket.

== Results ==
Legend

- F — Won by fall
- WO — Won by walkover

=== Final ===
Final
Jordan Burroughs (USA)	5
Mohammad Nokhodi (IRI)	1

=== Top half ===
Round of 32
Csaba Vida (HUN)	5
Bolat Sakayev (KAZ)	5^{F}
Sam Barmish (CAN)	0
Jordan Burroughs (USA)	10
Radik Valiev (RWF)	10^{F}
Arsalan Budazhapov (KGZ)	1

Round of 16
Achsarbek Gulajev (SVK)	0
Ashraf Ashirov (AZE)	4
Ryuki Yoshida (JPN)	10
Oh Man-ho (KOR)	0
~~Bolat Sakayev (KAZ)~~
Jordan Burroughs (USA)	WO
Radik Valiev (RWF)	12
Alans Amirovs (LAT)	2

Quarterfinals
Ashraf Ashirov (AZE)	4
Ryuki Yoshida (JPN)	4
Jordan Burroughs (USA)	9
Radik Valiev (RWF)	4

Semifinals
Ryuki Yoshida (JPN)	1
Jordan Burroughs (USA)	10

=== Bottom half ===
Round of 32
Erik Reinbok (EST)	3
Maxim Vasilioglo (ROU)	6
Ramazan Sarı (TUR)	10
Oktay Hasan (BUL)	0
Georgios Kougioumtsidis (GRE)	10
Suresh Fernando (SRI)	0
Arman Avagyan (ARM)	11
Rustam Rasuiev (UKR)	0
Mohammad Nokhodi (IRI)	11
Aron Caneva (ITA)	0
Byambasürengiin Bat-Erdene (MGL)	10
Gourav Baliyan (IND)	0

Round of 16
Nika Kentchadze (GEO)	5
Maxim Vasilioglo (ROU)	2
Ramazan Sarı (TUR)	4
Georgios Kougioumtsidis (GRE)	6
Arman Avagyan (ARM)	4
Mohammad Nokhodi (IRI)	8
Byambasürengiin Bat-Erdene (MGL)	5
Saifedine Alekma (FRA)	7

Quarterfinals
Nika Kentchadze (GEO)	9
Georgios Kougioumtsidis (GRE)	5
Mohammad Nokhodi (IRI)	11
Saifedine Alekma (FRA)	0

Semifinals
Nika Kentchadze (GEO)	5
Mohammad Nokhodi (IRI)	6

=== Repechage ===
Repechage round 1
Sam Barmish (CAN)	WO
~~Bolat Sakayev (KAZ)~~
Aron Caneva (ITA)	2
Arman Avagyan (ARM)	13

Repechage round 2
Sam Barmish (CAN)	0
Radik Valiev (RWF)	10
Arman Avagyan (ARM)	7
Saifedine Alekma (FRA)	3

Bronze medals
Radik Valiev (RWF)	11
Ryuki Yoshida (JPN)	0
Arman Avagyan (ARM)	0
Nika Kentchadze (GEO)	10

== Final standing ==
Rank	Athlete
1st place, gold medalist(s)	Jordan Burroughs (USA)
2nd place, silver medalist(s)	Mohammad Nokhodi (IRI)
3rd place, bronze medalist(s)	Nika Kentchadze (GEO)
3rd place, bronze medalist(s)	Radik Valiev (RWF)
5	Ryuki Yoshida (JPN)
5	Arman Avagyan (ARM)
7	Georgios Kougioumtsidis (GRE)
8	Byambasürengiin Bat-Erdene (MGL)
9	Ramazan Sarı (TUR)
10	Sam Barmish (CAN)
11	Saifedine Alekma (FRA)
12	Ashraf Ashirov (AZE)
13	Maxim Vasilioglo (ROU)
14	Erik Reinbok (EST)
15	Alans Amirovs (LAT)
16	Aron Caneva (ITA)
17	Csaba Vida (HUN)
18	Arsalan Budazhapov (KGZ)
19	Achsarbek Gulajev (SVK)
20	Oh Man-ho (KOR)
21	Oktay Hasan (BUL)
22	Suresh Fernando (SRI)
23	Gourav Baliyan (IND)
24	Rustam Rasuiev (UKR)
—	Bolat Sakayev (KAZ)
