= 2022 European Wrestling Championships – Men's freestyle 79 kg =

Wrestling competition

Men's freestyle 79 kg at the 2022 European Wrestling Championships
- Venue: BOK Sports Hall
- Location: Budapest, Hungary
- Dates: 28-29 March
- Competitors: 14

Medalists
gold medal	Georgios Kougioumtsidis	Greece
silver medal	Ashraf Ashirov	Azerbaijan
bronze medal	Vladimeri Gamkrelidze	Georgia
bronze medal	Muhammet Akdeniz	Turkey

The men's freestyle 79 kg was a competition featured at the 2022 European Wrestling Championships, and was held in Budapest, Hungary on March 28 and 29.

== Results ==
Legend

- F — Won by fall
- R — Retired

=== Main Bracket ===
1/8 finals
Miroslav Kirov (BUL)	0
Ashraf Ashirov (AZE)	9
Achsarbek Gulajev (SVK)	1
Iakub Shikhdzamalov (ROU)	4
Csaba Vida (HUN)	8
Vladimeri Gamkrelidze (GEO)	9
Saifedine Alekma (FRA)	10
Dejan Mitrov (MKD)	0
Stanislav Novac (MDA)	0^{R}
Muhammet Akdeniz (TUR)	6
Alans Amirovs (LAT)	6
Dan Or Tsesarsky (ISR)	4

Quarterfinals
Arman Avagyan (ARM)	0
Ashraf Ashirov (AZE)	11
Iakub Shikhdzamalov (ROU)	5
Vladimeri Gamkrelidze (GEO)	7
Saifedine Alekma (FRA)	3
Muhammet Akdeniz (TUR)	5
Alans Amirovs (LAT)	6
Georgios Kougioumtsidis (GRE)	16

Semifinals
Ashraf Ashirov (AZE)	13
Vladimeri Gamkrelidze (GEO)	7
Muhammet Akdeniz (TUR)	10
Georgios Kougioumtsidis (GRE)	15

Final
Ashraf Ashirov (AZE)	6
Georgios Kougioumtsidis (GRE)	7

=== Repechage ===
Repechage round 1
Miroslav Kirov (BUL)	0
Arman Avagyan (ARM)	8

Bronze medal match
Arman Avagyan (ARM)	7
Vladimeri Gamkrelidze (GEO)	9
Alans Amirovs (LAT)	4
Muhammet Akdeniz (TUR)	8

== Final standing ==
Rank	Wrestler	UWW Points
1st place, gold medalist(s)	Georgios Kougioumtsidis (GRE)	13000
2nd place, silver medalist(s)	Ashraf Ashirov (AZE)	11000
3rd place, bronze medalist(s)	Vladimeri Gamkrelidze (GEO)	9500
3rd place, bronze medalist(s)	Muhammet Akdeniz (TUR)	9500
5	Arman Avagyan (ARM)	8000
5	Alans Amirovs (LAT)	8000
7	Saifedine Alekma (FRA)	7400
8	Iakub Shikhdzamalov (ROU)	7000
9	Csaba Vida (HUN)	6500
10	Dan Or Tsesarsky (ISR)	6100
11	Achsarbek Gulajev (SVK)	4000
12	Stanislav Novac (MDA)	3800
13	Dejan Mitrov (MKD)	3600
14	Miroslav Kirov (BUL)	3400
