= 2020 European Wrestling Championships – Men's freestyle 79 kg =

Wrestling competition

The men's freestyle 79 kg is a competition featured at the 2020 European Wrestling Championships, and was held in Rome, Italy on February 14 and February 15.

== Medalists ==
Gold	Mahamedkhabib Kadzimahamedau; Belarus
Silver	Magomed Ramazanov; Russia
Bronze	Vasyl Mykhailov; Ukraine
Bronze	Jabrayil Hasanov; Azerbaijan

== Results ==
Legend

- F — Won by fall

=== Final ===
Final
Mahamedkhabib Kadzimahamedau (BLR)	10
Magomed Ramazanov (RUS)	3

=== Top half ===
Round of 32

Round of 16
Alexandros Tsanikidis (GRE)	0
Mahamedkhabib Kadzimahamedau (BLR)	8
Vasyl Mykhailov (UKR)	11
Saifedine Alekma (FRA)	0
Erik Reinbok (EST)	7
Simon Marchl (AUT)	1
Dzhemal Ali (BUL)	9
Andrius Mažeika (LTU)	7

Quarterfinals
Mahamedkhabib Kadzimahamedau (BLR)	9
Vasyl Mykhailov (UKR)	1
Erik Reinbok (EST)	0
Dzhemal Ali (BUL)	9

Semifinals
Mahamedkhabib Kadzimahamedau (BLR)	10
Dzhemal Ali (BUL)	1

=== Bottom half ===
Round of 32
Jabrayil Hasanov (AZE)	3
Nika Kentchadze (GEO)	3
Salvatore Diana (ITA)	3
Omaraskhab Nazhmudinov (ROU)	14

Round of 16
Achsarbek Gulajev (SVK)	5
Hanoch Rachamin (ISR)	2
Batuhan Demirçin (TUR)	0
Magomed Ramazanov (RUS)	3
Gheorghi Pascalov (MDA)	5
Arman Avagyan (ARM)	7
Jabrayil Hasanov (AZE)	8
Omaraskhab Nazhmudinov (ROU)	8

Quarterfinals
Achsarbek Gulajev (SVK)	0
Magomed Ramazanov (RUS)	10
Arman Avagyan (ARM)	4
Jabrayil Hasanov (AZE)	8

Semifinals
Magomed Ramazanov (RUS)	4
Jabrayil Hasanov (AZE)	2

=== Repechage ===
Repechage round 2
Alexandros Tsanikidis (GRE)	0
Vasyl Mykhailov (UKR)	10
Batuhan Demirçin (TUR)	7
Achsarbek Gulajev (SVK)	3

Bronze medal match
Vasyl Mykhailov (UKR)	7
Dzhemal Ali (BUL)	0
Batuhan Demirçin (TUR)	4
Jabrayil Hasanov (AZE)	5

== Final standing ==
Rank	Athlete
1st place, gold medalist(s)	Mahamedkhabib Kadzimahamedau (BLR)
2nd place, silver medalist(s)	Magomed Ramazanov (RUS)
3rd place, bronze medalist(s)	Vasyl Mykhailov (UKR)
3rd place, bronze medalist(s)	Jabrayil Hasanov (AZE)
5	Dzhemal Ali (BUL)
5	Batuhan Demirçin (TUR)
7	Omaraskhab Nazhmudinov (ROU)
8	Arman Avagyan (ARM)
9	Achsarbek Gulajev (SVK)
10	Erik Reinbok (EST)
11	Andrius Mažeika (LTU)
12	Gheorghi Pascalov (MDA)
13	Nika Kentchadze (GEO)
14	Salvatore Diana (ITA)
15	Hanoch Rachamin (ISR)
16	Simon Marchl (AUT)
17	Saifedine Alekma (FRA)
18	Alexandros Tsanikidis (GRE)
