= 2023 Yasar Dogu Tournament =

Yasar Dogu 2023
- Host city: Istanbul, Turkey
- Dates: 23–25 June
- Stadium: Başakşehir Youth and Sports Facility

Champions
- Freestyle: Turkey
- Women: Turkey

The 51st Yasar Dogu Tournament 2023 (Turkish: 2023 Yaşar Doğu Turnuvası) was a wrestling event that was held in Istanbul, Turkey between 23 and 25 June 2023 together with the 2023 Vehbi Emre & Hamit Kaplan Tournament.

The international tournament included competition in both men's and women's freestyle wrestling. The tournament was held in honor of Olympic Champion, Yaşar Doğu.

== Competition schedule ==
All times are (UTC+3)

Date	Time	Event
21 June	11.00-14.30	Qualification rounds & repechage GR – 55-63-72-82-97 kg
21 June	17.30-19.30	Final matches and awarding ceremony: GR – 55-63-72-82-97 kg
22 June	11.00-14.30	Qualification rounds & repechage GR – 60-67-77-87-130 kg
22 June	17.30-19.30	Final matches and awarding ceremony: Finals GR – 60-67-77-87-130 kg
23 June	11.00-14.30	Qualification rounds & repechage FS – 57-65-70-86 kg & WW – 50–55-59-62 kg
23 June	17.30-19.30	Final matches and awarding ceremony: Finals FS – 57-65-70-86 kg & WW – 50–55-59-62 kg
24 June	11.00-14.30	Qualification rounds & repechage FS – 74-79-92 kg & WW – 57–65–72 kg
24 June	17.30-19.30	Final matches and awarding ceremony: Finals FS – 74-79-92 kg & WW – 57–65–72 kg
25 June	11.00-14.30	Qualification rounds & repechage FS – 61-97-125 kg & WW – 53–68–76 kg
25 June	17.30-19.30	Final matches and awarding ceremony: Finals FS – 61-97-125 kg & WW – 53–68–76 kg

== Medal table ==
* Host nation (Turkey)

Rank	Nation	Gold	Silver	Bronze	Total
1	Turkey*	8	14	12	34
2	Iran	4	2	2	8
3	Kazakhstan	3	3	2	8
4	Azerbaijan	3	0	6	9
5	North Macedonia	1	0	1	2
6	Romania	1	0	0	1
7	Germany	0	1	4	5
Totals (7 entries)		20	20	27	67

== Team ranking ==
Rank	Men's freestyle		Women's freestyle	
Rank	Team	Points	Team	Points
1	Turkey	210	Turkey	215
2	Iran	178	Kazakhstan	174
3	Germany	93	Azerbaijan	73
4	Azerbaijan	70	North Macedonia	25
5	North Macedonia	51	—	—

== Medal overview ==
=== Men's freestyle ===
Event	Gold	Silver	Bronze
57 kg	Ebrahim Khari; Iran	Horst Lehr; Germany	Niklas Stechele; Germany
57 kg	Ebrahim Khari; Iran	Horst Lehr; Germany	Yusuf Demir; Turkey
61 kg	Emrah Ormanoğlu; Turkey	Ali Khorramdel; Iran	Ahmet Duman; Turkey
61 kg	Emrah Ormanoğlu; Turkey	Ali Khorramdel; Iran	Intigam Valizada; Azerbaijan
65 kg	Mohammad Reza Shakeri; Iran	Cavit Acar; Turkey	Ziraddin Bayramov; Azerbaijan
65 kg	Mohammad Reza Shakeri; Iran	Cavit Acar; Turkey	Rashid Babazade; Azerbaijan
70 kg	Magomed Khaniev; Azerbaijan	Ali Rezaei; Iran	Haydar Yavuz; Turkey
70 kg	Magomed Khaniev; Azerbaijan	Ali Rezaei; Iran	Kevin Henkel; Germany
74 kg	Iakub Shikhdzamalov; Romania	Mevlüt Özdemir; Turkey	Hossein Mohammad Aghaei; Iran
74 kg	Iakub Shikhdzamalov; Romania	Mevlüt Özdemir; Turkey	Rasul Shapiev; North Macedonia
79 kg	Muhammet Akdeniz; Turkey	İsa Demir; Turkey	Orkhan Abasov; Azerbaijan
79 kg	Muhammet Akdeniz; Turkey	İsa Demir; Turkey	Ashraf Ashirov; Azerbaijan
86 kg	Fatih Erdin; Turkey	İsmail Küçüksolak; Turkey	Osman Göçen; Turkey
86 kg	Fatih Erdin; Turkey	İsmail Küçüksolak; Turkey	Lars Schäfle; Germany
92 kg	Mohammad Mobin Azimi; Iran	Atilla Kaan Aydın; Turkey	Yunus Emre Yıldız; Turkey
97 kg	İbrahim Çiftçi; Turkey	Mustafa Sessiz; Turkey	Erik Thiele; Germany
97 kg	İbrahim Çiftçi; Turkey	Mustafa Sessiz; Turkey	Abolfazl Babaloo; Iran
125 kg	Mostafa Tagani; Iran	Adil Mısırcı; Turkey	Fatih Yaşarlı; Turkey

=== Women's freestyle ===
Event	Gold	Silver	Bronze
50 kg	Veronika Ryabovolova; North Macedonia	Emine Çataloğlu; Turkey	Zehra Demirhan; Turkey
53 kg	Elnura Mammadova; Azerbaijan	Laura Almaganbetova; Kazakhstan	Sıla Aykul; Turkey
55 kg	Ainur Ashimova; Kazakhstan	Esra Pul; Turkey	Sinem Köroğlu; Turkey
57 kg	Elvira Kamaloğlu; Turkey	Bediha Gün; Turkey	Emma Tissina; Kazakhstan
59 kg	Mehlika Öztürk; Turkey	Diana Kayumova; Kazakhstan	Ebru Dağbaşı; Turkey
62 kg	Birgul Soltanova; Azerbaijan	Merve Karadeniz; Turkey	Dilan Tan; Turkey
65 kg	Kadriye Aksoy; Turkey	Irina Kazyulina; Kazakhstan	Nigar Mirzazade; Azerbaijan
68 kg	Yelena Shalygina; Kazakhstan	Nesrin Baş; Turkey	Meruyert Imanbekova; Kazakhstan
72 kg	Bukrenaz Sert; Turkey	Merve Pul; Turkey	None awarded
76 kg	Gulmaral Yerkebayeva; Kazakhstan	Mehtap Gültekin; Turkey	Melisa Sarıtaç; Turkey

== Participating nations ==
131 competitors from 12 nations participated:

1. Azerbaijan (12)
2. Canada (2)
3. Germany (9)
4. Iran (10)
5. Italy (1)
6. Kazakhstan (18)
7. North Macedonia (7)
8. Netherlands (1)
9. New Zealand (1)
10. Romania (1)
11. Slovakia (1)
12. Turkey (68)

== Results ==
- F — Won by fall
- R — Retired
- WO — Won by walkover

=== Men's freestyle ===
==== Men's freestyle 57 kg ====
Round of 16
Aid Salihasi (MKD)	4
Mehmet Yüce (TUR)	6

Quarterfinals
Emre Şahin (TUR)	5
Mehmet Yüce (TUR)	4
Horst Lehr (GER)	10
Yusuf Demir (TUR)	0
Niklas Stechele (GER)	0
Ebrahim Khari (IRI)	11
Daulet Temirzhanov (KAZ)	12
Simone Piroddu (ITA)	10

Semifinals
Emre Şahin (TUR)	2
Horst Lehr (GER)	3
Ebrahim Khari (IRI)	10
Daulet Temirzhanov (KAZ)	1

Final
Horst Lehr (GER)
Ebrahim Khari (IRI)	WO

Bronze medal match
Yusuf Demir (TUR)	6^{F}
Emre Şahin (TUR)	0
Niklas Stechele (GER)	7
Daulet Temirzhanov (KAZ)	2

==== Men's freestyle 61 kg ====
Round of 16
Vladimir Egorov (MKD)	1
Recep Topal (TUR)	2

Quarterfinals
Ramzan Awtaew (GER)	5
Recep Topal (TUR)	5
Emrah Ormanoğlu (TUR)	10
Ahmet Duman (TUR)	2
Şair Hüseyin (TUR)	12
Bayram İlhan (TUR)	2
Intigam Valizada (AZE)	0
Ali Khorramdel (IRI)	11

Semifinals
Recep Topal (TUR)	0
Emrah Ormanoğlu (TUR)	4
Şair Hüseyin (TUR)	0
Ali Khorramdel (IRI)	10

Final
Emrah Ormanoğlu (TUR)	2
Ali Khorramdel (IRI)	1

Bronze medal match
Ahmet Duman (TUR)	WO
Recep Topal (TUR)
Intigam Valizada (AZE)	10
Şair Hüseyin (TUR)	2

==== Men's freestyle 65 kg ====
Round of 16
Ferhat Kılıç (TUR)	4
Mustafa Zopalı (TUR)	0

Quarterfinals
Hamza Alaca (TUR)	4
Ferhat Kılıç (TUR)	8
Cavit Acar (TUR)	7
Ziraddin Bayramov (AZE)	5
Mohammad Reza Shakeri (IRI)	10
Ahmet Salim Yiğit (TUR)	0
Rashid Babazade (AZE)	10
Adam Al Kandoussi (NED)	0

Semifinals
Ferhat Kılıç (TUR)	2
Cavit Acar (TUR)	4
Mohammad Reza Shakeri (IRI)	6
Rashid Babazade (AZE)	1

Final
Cavit Acar (TUR)	2
Mohammad Reza Shakeri (IRI)	10

Bronze medal match
Ziraddin Bayramov (AZE)	9
Ferhat Kılıç (TUR)	8
Ahmet Salim Yiğit (TUR)	1
Rashid Babazade (AZE)	2

==== Men's freestyle 70 kg ====
Round of 16
Burak Sinin (TUR)	3
Bilal Akbıyık (TUR)	3

Quarterfinals
Faruk Kırtepe (TUR)	2
Bilal Akbıyık (TUR)	5
Haydar Yavuz (TUR)	8
Ali Rezaei (IRI)	10
Fati Vejseli (MKD)	1
Kanan Heybatov (AZE)	1
Magomed Khaniev (AZE)	10
Kevin Henkel (GER)	0

Semifinals
Bilal Akbıyık (TUR)	1
Ali Rezaei (IRI)	11
Fati Vejseli (MKD)	0
Magomed Khaniev (AZE)	10

Final
Ali Rezaei (IRI)	6
Magomed Khaniev (AZE)	11

Bronze medal match
Haydar Yavuz (TUR)	2
Bilal Akbıyık (TUR)	1
Kevin Henkel (GER)	10
Fati Vejseli (MKD)	0

==== Men's freestyle 74 kg ====
Round of 16
İsmet Çiftçi (TUR)	10
Cole Hawkins (NZL)	0

Quarterfinals
Hossein Mohammad Aghaei (IRI)	10
İsmet Çiftçi (TUR)	0
Iakub Shikhdzamalov (ROU)	8
Coşkun Keleş (TUR)	2
Jasmit Phulka (CAN)	0
Mevlüt Özdemir (TUR)	11
Cengizhan Doğan (TUR)	3
Rasul Shapiev (MKD)	9

Semifinals
Hossein Mohammad Aghaei (IRI)	7
Iakub Shikhdzamalov (ROU)	8
Mevlüt Özdemir (TUR)	3
Rasul Shapiev (MKD)	2

Final
Iakub Shikhdzamalov (ROU)	4
Mevlüt Özdemir (TUR)	0

Bronze medal match
Coşkun Keleş (TUR)	0
Hossein Mohammad Aghaei (IRI)	10
Jasmit Phulka (CAN)	2
Rasul Shapiev (MKD)	6

==== Men's freestyle 79 kg ====
Round of 16
Hakan Satılmış (TUR)	WO
~~Okan Tahtacı (TUR)~~
Soslan Tigiyev (AZE)	4
Sobhan Rahmani (IRI)	4
Fatih Çelik (TUR)	0
Ashraf Ashirov (AZE)	10^{F}

Quarterfinals
Jakub Sýkora (SVK)	0
Hakan Satılmış (TUR)	2
İsa Demir (TUR)	2
Orkhan Abasov (AZE)	2
Muhammet Akdeniz (TUR)	10
Soslan Tigiyev (AZE)	0
Ashraf Ashirov (AZE)	10
Farzad Jahanshahi (IRI)	6

Semifinals
Hakan Satılmış (TUR)	3
İsa Demir (TUR)	4
Muhammet Akdeniz (TUR)	11
Ashraf Ashirov (AZE)	0

Final
İsa Demir (TUR)	5
Muhammet Akdeniz (TUR)	6

Bronze medal match
Orkhan Abasov (AZE)	8
Hakan Satılmış (TUR)	1
Soslan Tigiyev (AZE)	2
Ashraf Ashirov (AZE)	9

==== Men's freestyle 86 kg ====
Quarterfinals		Semifinals		Final
Andrew Terry Johnson (CAN)	0
Joshua Morodion (GER)	10	Joshua Morodion (GER)	7
Lars Schäfle (GER)	2	İsmail Küçüksolak (TUR)	8
İsmail Küçüksolak (TUR)	2			İsmail Küçüksolak (TUR)	0
Fatih Erdin (TUR)	7			Fatih Erdin (TUR)	7
Alperen Sezer (TUR)	2	Fatih Erdin (TUR)	4
Adam Modosjan (MKD)	0	Osman Göçen (TUR)	3
Osman Göçen (TUR)	10

Bronze medal match
Lars Schäfle (GER)	7
Joshua Morodion (GER)	0
Alperen Sezer (TUR)	0
Osman Göçen (TUR)	7

==== Men's freestyle 92 kg ====
24 June

Pos	Athlete	Pld	W	L	CP	TP	IRI	TUR	TUR	MKD
1	Mohammad Mobin Azimi (IRI)	3	3	0	12	34	—	13–2	11–0	10–0
2	Atilla Kaan Aydın (TUR)	3	2	1	8	19	1–4 VSU1	—	6–2	11–0
3	Yunus Emre Yıldız (TUR)	3	1	2	5	16	0–4 VSU	1–3 VPO1	—	14–4
4	Stole Eftimov (MKD)	3	0	3	1	4	0–4 VSU	0–4 VSU	1–4 VSU1	—

Source: UWW

==== Men's freestyle 97 kg ====
Round of 16
İbrahim Çiftçi (TUR)	5
Erik Thiele (GER)	0

Quarterfinals
Ertuğrul Ağca (GER)	0
İbrahim Çiftçi (TUR)	11
Johannes Mayer (GER)	1
Mehmet Çelebi (TUR)	3
Müren Mutlu (TUR)	0
Mustafa Sessiz (TUR)	4
Abolfazl Babaloo (IRI)	5
Oktay Çiftçi (TUR)	2

Semifinals
İbrahim Çiftçi (TUR)	10
Mehmet Çelebi (TUR)	0
Mustafa Sessiz (TUR)	8
Abolfazl Babaloo (IRI)	3

Final
İbrahim Çiftçi (TUR)	4
Mustafa Sessiz (TUR)	4

Repechage round 1
Erik Thiele (GER)	3
Ertuğrul Ağca (GER)	0

Bronze medal match
Erik Thiele (GER)	5
Mehmet Çelebi (TUR)	1
Müren Mutlu (TUR)	2
Abolfazl Babaloo (IRI)	5

==== Men's freestyle 125 kg ====
24 June

Pos	Athlete	Pld	W	L	CP	TP	IRI	TUR	TUR	TUR
1	Mostafa Tagani (IRI)	3	3	0	12	19	—	13–2	6–1	WO
2	Adil Mısırcı (TUR)	3	2	1	9	4	1–4 VSU1	—	2–2	WO
3	Fatih Yaşarlı (TUR)	3	1	2	7	5	1–3 VPO1	1–3 VPO1	—	WO
4	Oktay Güngör (TUR)	3	0	3	0	0	0–5 VIN	0–5 VIN	0–5 VIN	—

Source: UWW

=== Women's freestyle ===
==== Women's freestyle 50 kg ====
23 June

Pos	Athlete	Pld	W	L	CP	TP	MKD	KAZ	TUR	AZE
1	Veronika Ryabovolova (MKD)	3	3	0	13	18	—	6–1 Fall	4–0	8–0 Fall
2	Madina Zheniskyzy (KAZ)	3	2	1	8	9	0–5 VFA	—	5–3	3–1 Fall
3	Fatma Kızmaz (TUR)	3	1	2	4	6	0–3 VPO	1–3 VPO1	—	3–3
4	Shahana Nazarova (AZE)	3	0	3	1	4	0–5 VFA	0–5 VFA	1–3 VPO1	—

Pos	Athlete	Pld	W	L	CP	TP	TUR	TUR	KAZ
1	Emine Çataloğlu (TUR)	2	2	0	6	7	—	5–0	2–0
2	Zehra Demirhan (TUR)	2	1	1	3	4	0–3 VPO	—	4–2
3	Maral Tangirbergenova (KAZ)	2	0	2	1	2	0–3 VPO	1–3 VPO1	—

Source: UWW

Semifinals
Veronika Ryabovolova (MKD)	2^{F}
Zehra Demirhan (TUR)	0
Emine Çataloğlu (TUR)	9
Madina Zheniskyzy (KAZ)	0

Final
Veronika Ryabovolova (MKD)	5^{F}
Emine Çataloğlu (TUR)	0
Bronze medal
Zehra Demirhan (TUR)	2^{F}
Madina Zheniskyzy (KAZ)	0

==== Women's freestyle 53 kg ====
25 June

Pos	Athlete	Pld	W	L	CP	TP	KAZ	TUR	TUR
1	Laura Almaganbetova (KAZ)	2	2	0	8	22	—	11–0	11–1
2	Sıla Aykul (TUR)	2	1	1	3	12	0–4 VSU	—	12–6
3	Şeyma Kızmaz (TUR)	2	0	2	2	7	1–4 VSU1	1–3 VPO1	—

Pos	Athlete	Pld	W	L	CP	TP	AZE	KAZ	TUR
1	Elnura Mammadova (AZE)	2	2	0	10	7	—	7–0 Fall	WO
2	Madina Assan (KAZ)	2	1	1	5	0	0–5 VFA	—	WO
3	Zeynep Yetgil (TUR)	2	0	2	0	0	0–5 VIN	0–5 VIN	—

Source: UWW

Semifinals
Laura Almaganbetova (KAZ)	4^{F}
Madina Assan (KAZ)	0
Elnura Mammadova (AZE)	10
Sıla Aykul (TUR)	0

Final
Laura Almaganbetova (KAZ)	2
Elnura Mammadova (AZE)	2^{F}
Bronze medal
Madina Assan (KAZ)	4
Sıla Aykul (TUR)	6

==== Women's freestyle 55 kg ====
23 June

Pos	Athlete	Pld	W	L	CP	TP	KAZ	TUR	TUR	TUR
1	Ainur Ashimova (KAZ)	3	3	0	10	31	—	12–2	10–1	9–4
2	Esra Pul (TUR)	3	2	1	8	14	1–4 VSU1	—	10–0	2–2
3	Sinem Köroğlu (TUR)	3	1	2	6	1	1–3 VPO1	0–4 VSU	—	WO
4	Melda Dernekçi (TUR)	3	0	3	2	6	1–3 VPO1	1–3 VPO1	0–5 VIN	—

Source: UWW

==== Women's freestyle 57 kg ====
24 June

Pos	Athlete	Pld	W	L	CP	TP	TUR	KAZ	KAZ
1	Elvira Kamaloğlu (TUR)	2	2	0	8	8	—	1–0	7–2 Fall
2	Emma Tissina (KAZ)	2	1	1	4	13	0–3 VPO	—	13–0
3	Assylzat Sagymbay (KAZ)	2	0	2	0	2	0–5 VFA	0–4 VSU	—

Pos	Athlete	Pld	W	L	CP	TP	TUR	TUR	TUR
1	Bediha Gün (TUR)	2	2	0	9	14	—	10–0	4–0 Fall
2	Özge Fındıkçı (TUR)	2	1	1	4	10	0–4 VSU	—	10–0
3	İlklim Kiraz (TUR)	2	0	2	0	0	0–5 VFA	0–4 VSU	—

Source: UWW

Semifinals
Elvira Kamaloğlu (TUR)	10
Özge Fındıkçı (TUR)	0
Bediha Gün (TUR)	10
Emma Tissina (KAZ)	0

Final
Elvira Kamaloğlu (TUR)	4
Bediha Gün (TUR)	1
Bronze medal
Özge Fındıkçı (TUR)	2
Emma Tissina (KAZ)	4^{F}

==== Women's freestyle 59 kg ====
23 June

Pos	Athlete	Pld	W	L	CP	TP	TUR	KAZ	TUR	TUR	KAZ
1	Mehlika Öztürk (TUR)	4	3	1	10	26	—	5–4	13–4	3–4	5–1
2	Diana Kayumova (KAZ)	4	3	1	10	17	1–3 VPO1	—	5–2	5–2	3–0
3	Ebru Dağbaşı (TUR)	4	2	2	8	13	1–3 VPO1	1–3 VPO1	—	1–1	6–1
4	Eda Tekin (TUR)	4	2	2	8	15	3–1 VPO1	1–3 VPO1	1–3 VPO1	—	8–5
5	Guldana Bekesh (KAZ)	4	0	4	3	7	1–3 VPO1	0–3 VPO	1–3 VPO1	1–3 VPO1	—

Source: UWW

==== Women's freestyle 62 kg ====
23 June

Pos	Athlete	Pld	W	L	CP	TP	AZE	TUR	TUR	KAZ	TUR
1	Birgül Soltanova (AZE)	4	4	0	15	32	—	4–2	8–0	10–0	WO
2	Merve Karadeniz (TUR)	4	3	1	13	19	1–3 VPO1	—	7–0	10–0	WO
3	Dilan Tan (TUR)	4	2	2	9	18	0–3 VPO	0–3 VPO	—	10–0	8–0 Fall
4	Zhangul Bold (KAZ)	4	1	3	4	8	0–4 VSU	0–4 VSU	0–4 VSU	—	10–0
5	Kısmet Özmert (TUR)	4	0	4	0	0	0–5 VIN	0–5 VIN	0–5 VFA	0–4 VSU	—

Source: UWW

==== Women's freestyle 65 kg ====
23 June

Pos	Athlete	Pld	W	L	CP	TP	TUR	KAZ	AZE	TUR	KAZ
1	Kadriye Aksoy (TUR)	4	4	0	20	18	—	6–0 Fall	6–0 Fall	4–0 Fall	5–0 Fall
2	Irina Kazyulina (KAZ)	4	3	1	15	17	0–5 VFA	—	9–0 Fall	6–0 Fall	2–0 Fall
3	Nigar Mirzazade (AZE)	4	2	2	7	16	0–5 VFA	0–5 VFA	—	12–1	4–3
4	Derya Nur Karaduman (TUR)	4	1	3	6	5	0–5 VFA	0–5 VFA	1–4 VSU1	—	4–0 Fall
5	Gaukhar Mukatay (KAZ)	4	0	4	1	3	0–5 VFA	0–5 VFA	1–3 VPO1	0–5 VFA	—

Source: UWW

==== Women's freestyle 68 kg ====
25 June

Pos	Athlete	Pld	W	L	CP	TP	KAZ	TUR	KAZ	KAZ
1	Yelena Shalygina (KAZ)	3	3	0	12	19	—	5–3	14–4	WO
2	Nesrin Baş (TUR)	3	2	1	11	11	1–3 VPO1	—	8–0 Fall	WO
3	Meruyert Imanbekova (KAZ)	3	1	2	6	4	1–4 VSU1	0–5 VFA	—	WO
4	Madina Bakbergenova (KAZ)	3	0	3	0	0	0–5 VIN	0–5 VIN	0–5 VIN	—

Source: UWW

==== Women's freestyle 72 kg ====
Pos	Athlete	Pld	W	L	CP	TP	TUR	TUR
1	Bükrenaz Sert (TUR)	1	1	0	4	11	—	11–0
2	Merve Pul (TUR)	1	0	1	0	0	0–4 VSU	—

Source: UWW

==== Women's freestyle 76 kg ====
24 June

Pos	Athlete	Pld	W	L	CP	TP	KAZ	TUR	TUR
1	Gulmaral Yerkebayeva (KAZ)	2	2	0	7	18	—	8–0	10–0
2	Melisa Sarıtaç (TUR)	2	1	1	4	12	0–3 VPO	—	12–2
3	Nazar Bektaş (TUR)	2	0	2	1	2	0–4 VSU	1–4 VSU1	—

Pos	Athlete	Pld	W	L	CP	TP	TUR	TUR	KAZ
1	Mehtap Gültekin (TUR)	2	2	0	10	6	—	6–0 Fall	WO
2	Cansu Saltık (TUR)	2	1	1	5	10	0–5 VFA	—	WO
3	Zhamila Bakbergenova (KAZ)	2	0	2	0	0	0–5 VIN	0–5 VIN	—

Source: UWW

Semifinals
Gulmaral Yerkebayeva (KAZ)	6^{F}
Cansu Saltık (TUR)	0
Mehtap Gültekin (TUR)	3
Melisa Sarıtaç (TUR)	2

Final
Gulmaral Yerkebayeva (KAZ)	3
Mehtap Gültekin (TUR)	2
Bronze medal
Cansu Saltık (TUR)	0
Melisa Sarıtaç (TUR)	4^{F}
