= 2024 U23 World Wrestling Championships – Men's freestyle 65 kg =

Wrestling competitions

Men's freestyle 65 kg at the 2024 U23 World Championships
- Venue: Tirana Olympic Park
- Dates: 26–27 October
- Competitors: 26 from 24 nations

Medalists
gold medal	Ibragim Ibragimov	Authorised Neutral Athletes
silver medal	Kaiji Ogino	Japan
bronze medal	Abbas Ebrahimzadeh	Iran
bronze medal	Bilol Sharip Uulu	Kyrgyzstan

The men's freestyle 65 kilograms is a competition featured at the 2024 U23 World Wrestling Championships, and will be held in Tirana, Albania on 26 and 27 October 2024.

This freestyle wrestling competition consists of a single-elimination tournament, with a repechage used to determine the winner of two bronze medals. The two finalists face off for gold and silver medals. Each wrestler who loses to one of the two finalists moves into the repechage, culminating in a pair of bronze medal matches featuring the semifinal losers each facing the remaining repechage opponent from their half of the bracket.

== Results ==
Legend

- F — Won by fall

=== Final ===
Final
Kaiji Ogino (JPN)	2
Ibragim Ibragimov (AIN)	14

=== Top half ===
Round of 32
Hayk Abrahamyan (ARM)	6
Mohit Kumar (IND)	16
Abbas Ebrahimzadeh (IRI)	10
Matías Muñoz (CHI)	0
Shannon Hanna (BAH)	8
Goga Otinashvili (GEO)	3
Wilfredo López (PAN)	9
Jonnathan Pérez (GUA)	8
Mykyta Honcharov (UKR)	0
Abdullah Toprak (TUR)	11

Round of 16
Joshua Sanders (USA)	2
Mohit Kumar (IND)	9
Abbas Ebrahimzadeh (IRI)	6
Shannon Hanna (BAH)	0
Anatoli Hramyka (AIN)	14
Wilfredo López (PAN)	2
Abdullah Toprak (TUR)	0
Kaiji Ogino (JPN)	10

Quarterfinals
Mohit Kumar (IND)	2
Abbas Ebrahimzadeh (IRI)	14
Anatoli Hramyka (AIN)	4
Kaiji Ogino (JPN)	6

Semifinals
Abbas Ebrahimzadeh (IRI)	7
Kaiji Ogino (JPN)	11

=== Bottom half ===
Round of 32
Pavel Graur (MDA)	2
Bilol Sharip Uulu (KGZ)	12
Daniel Kulczyński (POL)	0
Ibragim Ibragimov (AIN)	12
Khamzat Arsamerzouev (FRA)	11
Bekzat Yermekbay (KAZ)	0
Rashid Babazade (AZE)	5
Alibeg Alibegov (BRN)	1
Umidjon Jalolov (UZB)	11
Zou Nianhu (CHN)	0

Round of 16
Marian Sandu (ROU)	0
Bilol Sharip Uulu (KGZ)	10
Ibragim Ibragimov (AIN)	11
Ilyas Abdurashidov (BEL)	0
Khamzat Arsamerzouev (FRA)	1
Rashid Babazade (AZE)	2
Umidjon Jalolov (UZB)	10
Wong Chi Hin (HKG)	0

Quarterfinals
Bilol Sharip Uulu (KGZ)	2
Ibragim Ibragimov (AIN)	8
Rashid Babazade (AZE)	0
Umidjon Jalolov (UZB)	11

Semifinals
Ibragim Ibragimov (AIN)	3
Umidjon Jalolov (UZB)	0

=== Repechage ===
Repechage round 1
Daniel Kulczyński (POL)	3
Ilyas Abdurashidov (BEL)	9

Repechage round 2
Abdullah Toprak (TUR)	11
Anatoli Hramyka (AIN)	0
Ilyas Abdurashidov (BEL)	4
Bilol Sharip Uulu (KGZ)	15

Bronze medals
Abdullah Toprak (TUR)	4
Abbas Ebrahimzadeh (IRI)	15
Bilol Sharip Uulu (KGZ)	4
Umidjon Jalolov (UZB)	1

== Final standing ==
Rank	Athlete
1st place, gold medalist(s)	Ibragim Ibragimov (ANA)
2nd place, silver medalist(s)	Kaiji Ogino (JPN)
3rd place, bronze medalist(s)	Abbas Ebrahimzadeh (IRI)
3rd place, bronze medalist(s)	Bilol Sharip Uulu (KGZ)
5	Abdullah Toprak (TUR)
5	Umidjon Jalolov (UZB)
7	Mohit Kumar (IND)
8	Rashid Babazade (AZE)
9	Anatoli Hramyka (AIN)
10	Khamzat Arsamerzouev (FRA)
11	Ilyas Abdurashidov (BEL)
12	Wilfredo López (PAN)
13	Shannon Hanna (BAH)
14	Jonnathan Pérez (GUA)
15	Hayk Abrahamyan (ARM)
16	Goga Otinashvili (GEO)
17	Daniel Kulczynski (POL)
18	Joshua Sanders (USA)
19	Pavel Graur (MDA)
20	Alibeg Alibegov (BRN)
21	Matías Muñoz (CHI)
22	Marian Sandu (ROU)
23	Wong Chi Hin (HKG)
24	Mykyta Honcharov (UKR)
25	Bekzat Yermekbay (KAZ)
26	Zou Nianhu (CHN)
