= 2023 U23 World Wrestling Championships – Men's freestyle 65 kg =

Wrestling competitions

Men's freestyle 65 kg at the 2023 U23 World Championships
- Venue: Tirana Olympic Park
- Dates: 24–25 October
- Competitors: 21 from 18 nations

Medalists
gold medal	Ibragim Ibragimov	Authorised Neutral Athletes
silver medal	Ziraddin Bayramov	Azerbaijan
bronze medal	Brock Hardy	United States
bronze medal	Abdullah Toprak	Turkey

The men's freestyle 65 kg is a competition featured at the 2023 U23 World Wrestling Championships, and was held in Tirana, Albania on 24 and 25 October 2023.

This freestyle wrestling competition consists of a single-elimination tournament, with a repechage used to determine the winner of two bronze medals. The two finalists face off for gold and silver medals. Each wrestler who loses to one of the two finalists moves into the repechage, culminating in a pair of bronze medal matches featuring the semifinal losers each facing the remaining repechage opponent from their half of the bracket.

== Results ==
Legend

- F — Won by fall
- WO — Won by walkover

=== Final ===
Final
Ziraddin Bayramov (AZE)	0
Ibragim Ibragimov (ANA)	7

=== Top half ===
Round of 32
Sammy Álvarez (PUR)	7
Brock Hardy (USA)	11
Aden Sakybaev (KGZ)	24
Frederik Nortje (RSA)	11
Adlan Askarov (KAZ)	6^{F}
Klevisi Preci (ALB)	0

Round of 16
Ziraddin Bayramov (AZE)	1
Pavel Graur (MDA)	1
Brock Hardy (USA)	11
Artem Kryvenko (UKR)	0
Islam Guseinov (ANA)	6
Aden Sakybaev (KGZ)	6
Adlan Askarov (KAZ)	6
Goga Otinashvili (GEO)	10

Quarterfinals
Ziraddin Bayramov (AZE)	14
Brock Hardy (USA)	11
Islam Guseinov (ANA)	1
Goga Otinashvili (GEO)	2

Semifinals
Ziraddin Bayramov (AZE)	5
Goga Otinashvili (GEO)	1

=== Bottom half ===
Round of 32
Kotaro Kiyooka (JPN)	12^{F}
Andranik Avetisyan (ARM)	1
Khamzat Arsamerzouev (FRA)	0
Ibragim Ibragimov (ANA)	10

Round of 16
Mohit Kumar (UWW)	9
Nico Megerle (GER)	2
Kotaro Kiyooka (JPN)	4
Omar Mourad (EGY)	2^{F}
Abdullah Toprak (TUR)	0
Ibragim Ibragimov (ANA)	9
Jason-Guy Luneau (CAN)	0
Ayub Musaev (BEL)	10

Quarterfinals
Mohit Kumar (UWW)	6^{F}
Omar Mourad (EGY)	4
Ibragim Ibragimov (ANA)	13
Ayub Musaev (BEL)	1

Semifinals
Mohit Kumar (UWW)	0
Ibragim Ibragimov (ANA)	5

=== Repechage ===
Repechage round 1
Khamzat Arsamerzouev (FRA)
Abdullah Toprak (TUR)	WO

Repechage round 2
Pavel Graur (MDA)	4
Brock Hardy (USA)	7
Abdullah Toprak (TUR)	7
Ayub Musaev (BEL)	1

Bronze medals
Brock Hardy (USA)	8
Goga Otinashvili (GEO)	5
Abdullah Toprak (TUR)	11
Mohit Kumar (UWW)	6

== Final standing ==
Rank	Athlete
1st place, gold medalist(s)	Ibragim Ibragimov (ANA)
2nd place, silver medalist(s)	Ziraddin Bayramov (AZE)
3rd place, bronze medalist(s)	Brock Hardy (USA)
3rd place, bronze medalist(s)	Abdullah Toprak (TUR)
5	Goga Otinashvili (GEO)
5	Mohit Kumar (UWW)
7	Adlan Askarov (KAZ)
8	Ayub Musaev (BEL)
9	Kotaro Kiyooka (JPN)
10	Omar Mourad (EGY)
11	Aden Sakybaev (KGZ)
12	Islam Guseinov (ANA)
13	Pavel Graur (MDA)
14	Frederik Nortje (RSA)
15	Sammy Álvarez (PUR)
16	Nico Megerle (GER)
17	Andranik Avetisyan (ARM)
18	Klevisi Preci (ALB)
19	Khamzat Arsamerzouev (FRA)
20	Jason-Guy Luneau (CAN)
21	Artem Kryvenko (UKR)
