= 2017 European Juniors Wrestling Championships =

- Host city: Dortmund, Germany
- Dates: June 27 – July 2, 2017

Champions
- Freestyle: Russia
- Greco-Roman: Georgia
- Women: Russia

The 2017 European Juniors Wrestling Championships was held in Dortmund, Germany between June 27 – July 2, 2017.

== Medal table ==
Rank	Nation	Gold	Silver	Bronze	Total
1	Russia	9	5	5	19
2	Georgia	4	2	7	13
3	Ukraine	3	3	2	8
4	Azerbaijan	3	3	1	7
5	Turkey	1	1	4	6
6	Norway	1	1	0	2
7	Finland	1	0	2	3
7	Romania	1	0	2	3
9	France	1	0	1	2
10	Sweden	0	2	0	2
11	Armenia	0	1	4	5
11	Belarus	0	1	4	5
13	Germany	0	1	3	4
13	Poland	0	1	3	4
15	Bulgaria	0	1	2	3
15	Italy	0	1	2	3
15	Moldova	0	1	2	3
18	Hungary	0	0	2	2
19	Estonia	0	0	1	1
19	Slovakia	0	0	1	1
Totals (20 entries)		24	24	48	96

== Team ranking ==
Rank	Men's freestyle		Men's Greco-Roman		Women's freestyle	
Rank	Team	Points	Team	Points	Team	Points
1	Russia	67	Georgia	71	Russia	66
2	Azerbaijan	58	Russia	68	Ukraine	51
3	Georgia	52	Turkey	51	Belarus	45
4	Moldova	40	Ukraine	44	Poland	35
5	Turkey	39	Finland	28	Germany	33

== Medal summary ==
=== Men's freestyle ===
Event	Gold	Silver	Bronze
50 kg	(Russia) Mukhammadkhon Mukhammadkhon	(Azerbaijan) Shahin Mukhtarov	(Armenia) Karen Zurabyan
50 kg	(Russia) Mukhammadkhon Mukhammadkhon	(Azerbaijan) Shahin Mukhtarov	(Germany) Horst Lehr
55 kg	(Azerbaijan) Afgan Khashalov	(Bulgaria) Mikyay Salim Naim	(Georgia (country)) Teimuraz Vanishvili
55 kg	(Azerbaijan) Afgan Khashalov	(Bulgaria) Mikyay Salim Naim	(Armenia) Arsen Harutyunyan
60 kg	(Azerbaijan) Ali Rahimzade	(Ukraine) Andriy Yatsenko	(Georgia (country)) Edemi Bolkvadze
60 kg	(Azerbaijan) Ali Rahimzade	(Ukraine) Andriy Yatsenko	(Russia) Abdulla Akhmedov
66 kg	(Russia) Anzor Zakuev	(Azerbaijan) Mahal Novruzov	(Bulgaria) Dzhemal Rushen Ali
66 kg	(Russia) Anzor Zakuev	(Azerbaijan) Mahal Novruzov	(Hungary) Csaba Vida
74 kg	(Russia) Rustam Magomedov	(Georgia (country)) Nika Kentchadze	(Turkey) Muhammed Küçükyıldırım
74 kg	(Russia) Rustam Magomedov	(Georgia (country)) Nika Kentchadze	(Slovakia) Achsarbek Gulajev
84 kg	(Azerbaijan) Gadzhimurad Magomedsaidov	(Russia) Gadzhimagomed Nazhmudinov	(Turkey) Osman Göçen
84 kg	(Azerbaijan) Gadzhimurad Magomedsaidov	(Russia) Gadzhimagomed Nazhmudinov	(Georgia (country)) Zaur Beradze
96 kg	(Georgia (country)) Givi Matcharashvili	(Italy) Simone Iannattoni	(Moldova) Dmitri Ceacusta
96 kg	(Georgia (country)) Givi Matcharashvili	(Italy) Simone Iannattoni	(Azerbaijan) Magomedrasul Gazimagomedov
120 kg	(Russia) Magomedamin Dibirov	(Armenia) Hovhannes Maghakyan	(Moldova) Samhan Jabrailov
120 kg	(Russia) Magomedamin Dibirov	(Armenia) Hovhannes Maghakyan	(Poland) Jakub Brylewski

=== Men's Greco-Roman ===
Event	Gold	Silver	Bronze
50 kg	(Georgia (country)) Ramaz Silagava	(Azerbaijan) Zulfigar Aliyev	(Turkey) Cemal Mutlu
50 kg	(Georgia (country)) Ramaz Silagava	(Azerbaijan) Zulfigar Aliyev	(Russia) Atmir Kotcev
55 kg	(Turkey) Kerem Kamal	(Russia) Emin Sefershaev	(Georgia (country)) Nugzari Tsurtsumia
55 kg	(Turkey) Kerem Kamal	(Russia) Emin Sefershaev	(Estonia) Helary Mägisalu
60 kg	(Georgia (country)) Leri Abuladze	(Sweden) Ardit Fazljija	(Russia) Fadis Valitov
60 kg	(Georgia (country)) Leri Abuladze	(Sweden) Ardit Fazljija	(Armenia) Hrachya Poghosyan
66 kg	(Ukraine) Parviz Nasibov	(Georgia (country)) Giorgi Kurtanidze	(Turkey) Murat Fırat
66 kg	(Ukraine) Parviz Nasibov	(Georgia (country)) Giorgi Kurtanidze	(Russia) Sergei Stepanov
74 kg	(Russia) Narek Oganian	(Ukraine) Elmar Nuraliiev	(Armenia) Malkhas Amoyan
74 kg	(Russia) Narek Oganian	(Ukraine) Elmar Nuraliiev	(Georgia (country)) Beka Mamukashvili
84 kg	(Russia) Aleksandr Komarov	(Belarus) Mikita Klimovich	(Finland) Toni Metsomaeki
84 kg	(Russia) Aleksandr Komarov	(Belarus) Mikita Klimovich	(Georgia (country)) Temuri Tchkuaselidze
96 kg	(Finland) Arvi Savolainen	(Turkey) Süleyman Erbay	(Ukraine) Vladlen Kozlyuk
96 kg	(Finland) Arvi Savolainen	(Turkey) Süleyman Erbay	(Georgia (country)) Giorgi Barbakadze
120 kg	(Georgia (country)) Zviadi Pataridze	(Russia) Georgii Gadzhinov	(Romania) Lenard Berei
120 kg	(Georgia (country)) Zviadi Pataridze	(Russia) Georgii Gadzhinov	(Finland) Konsta Mäenpää

=== Women's freestyle ===
Event	Gold	Silver	Bronze
44 kg	(Romania) Stefania Priceputu	(Russia) Anzhelika Fedorova	(Poland) Beata Kosla
44 kg	(Romania) Stefania Priceputu	(Russia) Anzhelika Fedorova	(Belarus) Ina Roik
48 kg	(Ukraine) Oksana Livach	(Germany) Lisa Ersel	(Poland) Agata Walerzak
48 kg	(Ukraine) Oksana Livach	(Germany) Lisa Ersel	(Hungary) Bianka Reczi
51 kg	(Russia) Ksenia Nezgovorova	(Ukraine) Khrystyna Bereza	(Belarus) Katsiaryna Pichkouskaya
51 kg	(Russia) Ksenia Nezgovorova	(Ukraine) Khrystyna Bereza	(Germany) Annika Wendle
55 kg	(Ukraine) Alina Hrushyna	(Russia) Viktoriia Vaulina	(Belarus) Darya Sinkavets
55 kg	(Ukraine) Alina Hrushyna	(Russia) Viktoriia Vaulina	(Germany) Elena Brugger
59 kg	(Norway) Grace Bullen	(Moldova) Anastasia Nichita	(Russia) Maria Matyushenko
59 kg	(Norway) Grace Bullen	(Moldova) Anastasia Nichita	(Ukraine) Ilona Prokopevniuk
63 kg	(Russia) Mariia Kuznetsova	(Poland) Aleksandra Wolczynska	(Bulgaria) Yuliana Yaneva
63 kg	(Russia) Mariia Kuznetsova	(Poland) Aleksandra Wolczynska	(Italy) Elena Esposito
67 kg	(Russia) Khanum Velieva	(Norway) Hedda Strand	(Romania) Alexandra Anghel
67 kg	(Russia) Khanum Velieva	(Norway) Hedda Strand	(France) Kendra Dacher
72 kg	(France) Koumba Larroque	(Sweden) Denise Stroem	(Italy) Eleni Pjollaj
72 kg	(France) Koumba Larroque	(Sweden) Denise Stroem	(Belarus) Yauheniya Andreichykava

Preceded by 2016 Bucharest	European Juniors Wrestling Championships; 2017	Succeeded by 2018 Rome
