= 2026 World Wrestling Championships – Men's freestyle 70 kg =

Men's freestyle 70 kg at the 2026 World Championships
- Venue: Barys Arena
- Dates: 30–31 October 2026
- Competitors: 24 from 24 nations

Medalists
gold medal	Ibragim Ibragimov	Russia
silver medal	Ernazar Akmataliev	Kyrgyzstan
bronze medal	Tömör-Ochiryn Tulga	Mongolia
bronze medal	Zain Retherford	United States

The men's freestyle 70 kilograms is a competition featured at the 2026 World Wrestling Championships, and was held in Astana, Kazakhstan on 30 and 31 October 2026.

This freestyle wrestling competition consists of a single-elimination tournament, with a repechage used to determine the winner of two bronze medals. The two finalists face off for gold and silver medals. Each wrestler who loses to one of the two finalists moves into the repechage, culminating in a pair of bronze medal matches, featuring the semifinal losers each facing the remaining repechage opponent from their half of the bracket.

== Results ==
Legend

- F — Won by fall
- WO — Won by walkover

=== Final ===
Final
Ibragim Ibragimov (RUS)	5
Ernazar Akmataliev (KGZ)	2

=== Top half ===
Round of 32
Sanzhar Doszhanov (KAZ)	13
Eugine Omulule (KEN)	0
Shakhzodbek Yarashev (UZB)	4^{F}
Ou Xuexian (CHN)	0
Ibragim Ibragimov (RUS)	10
Wotna Cana Ndoc (GBS)	0
Yuma Tomiyama (JPN)	3
Mustafo Akhmedov (TJK)	0

Round of 16
Tömör-Ochiryn Tulga (MGL)	3
Sanzhar Doszhanov (KAZ)	1
Shakhzodbek Yarashev (UZB)	0
Sina Khalili (IRI)	8
Vasile Diacon (MDA)	2
Ibragim Ibragimov (RUS)	6
Yuma Tomiyama (JPN)	11
Akaki Kemertelidze (GEO)	0

Quarterfinals
Tömör-Ochiryn Tulga (MGL)	6^{F}
Sina Khalili (IRI)	1
Ibragim Ibragimov (RUS)	5
Yuma Tomiyama (JPN)	0

Semifinals
Tömör-Ochiryn Tulga (MGL)	2
Ibragim Ibragimov (RUS)	3

=== Bottom half ===
Round of 32
Zain Retherford (USA)	4^{F}
Muhammad Abdurachmanov (BEL)	0
Vasyl Shuptar (UKR)	7
Choe Kang-ho (KOR)	0
Ferhat Kılıç (TUR)	7
Vishal Kaliraman (IND)	2
Ismael Ayoub (PUR)	0
Lachlan McNeil (CAN)	10

Round of 16
Iszmail Muszukajev (HUN)	3
Zain Retherford (USA)	7^{F}
Vasyl Shuptar (UKR)	2
Kanan Heybatov (AZE)	8
Arman Andreasyan (ARM)	1
Ferhat Kılıç (TUR)	3
Lachlan McNeil (CAN)	0
Ernazar Akmataliev (KGZ)	2

Quarterfinals
Zain Retherford (USA)	7
Kanan Heybatov (AZE)	0
Ferhat Kılıç (TUR)	3
Ernazar Akmataliev (KGZ)	8

Semifinals
Zain Retherford (USA)	2
Ernazar Akmataliev (KGZ)	3

=== Repechage ===
Repechage round 1
~~Wotna Cana Ndoc (GBS)~~
Vasile Diacon (MDA)	WO

Repechage round 2
Vasile Diacon (MDA)	13
Yuma Tomiyama (JPN)	1
Lachlan McNeil (CAN)	5
Ferhat Kılıç (TUR)	3

Bronze medals
Vasile Diacon (MDA)	0
Tömör-Ochiryn Tulga (MGL)	9^{F}
Lachlan McNeil (CAN)	0
Zain Retherford (USA)	4

== Final standing ==
Rank	Athlete
1st place, gold medalist(s)	Ibragim Ibragimov (RUS)
2nd place, silver medalist(s)	Ernazar Akmataliev (KGZ)
3rd place, bronze medalist(s)	Tömör-Ochiryn Tulga (MGL)
3rd place, bronze medalist(s)	Zain Retherford (USA)
5	Vasile Diacon (MDA)
5	Lachlan McNeil (CAN)
7	Yuma Tomiyama (JPN)
8	Ferhat Kılıç (TUR)
9	Shakhzodbek Yarashev (UZB)
10	Sanzhar Doszhanov (KAZ)
11	Vasyl Shuptar (UKR)
12	Sina Khalili (IRI)
13	Kanan Heybatov (AZE)
14	Vishal Kaliraman (IND)
15	Arman Andreasyan (ARM)
16	Iszmail Muszukajev (HUN)
17	Mustafo Akhmedov (TJK)
18	Ou Xuexian (CHN)
19	Muhammad Abdurachmanov (BEL)
20	Choe Kang-ho (KOR)
21	Ismael Ayoub (PUR)
22	Akaki Kemertelidze (GEO)
23	Eugine Omulule (KEN)
—	Wotna Cana Ndoc (GBS)
