= 2021 European Wrestling Championships – Men's freestyle 79 kg =

Wrestling competition

The men's freestyle 79 kg is a competition featured at the 2021 European Wrestling Championships, and was held in Warsaw, Poland on April 19 and April 20.

== Medalists ==
| Gold | Achsarbek Gulajev; Slovakia |
| Silver | Saifedine Alekma; France |
| Bronze | Nika Kentchadze; Georgia |
| Bronze | Alans Amirovs; Latvia |

== Results ==
Legend

- F — Won by fall

=== Final ===
| Final |
| Achsarbek Gulajev (SVK) | 2 |
| Saifedine Alekma (FRA) | 1 |

=== Top half ===
Round of 32

Round of 16
Achsarbek Gulajev (SVK) | 10
Dejan Mitrov (MKD) | 0
Arman Avagyan (ARM) | 10
Eduard Tatarinov (GER) | 0
Nika Kentchadze (GEO) | 10
Valentyn Babii (UKR) | 5
Muhammet Nuri Kotanoğlu (TUR) | 0
Malik Shavaev (RUS) | 10

Quarterfinals
Achsarbek Gulajev (SVK) | 11
Arman Avagyan (ARM) | 1
Nika Kentchadze (GEO) | 4
Malik Shavaev (RUS) | 3

Semifinals
Achsarbek Gulajev (SVK) | 5
Nika Kentchadze (GEO) | 4

=== Bottom half ===
Round of 32
Andrzej Sokalski (POL) | 0
Rashad Yusifli (AZE) | 9
Oktay Hasan (BUL) | 6
Eugeniu Mihalcean (MDA) | 0

Round of 16
Osman Hajdari (ALB) | 0
Saifedine Alekma (FRA) | 10
Alans Amirovs (LAT) | 2
Erik Reinbok (EST) | 1
Salvatore Diana (ITA) | 0
Andrei Karpach (BLR) | 5^{F}
Rashad Yusifli (AZE) | 3
Oktay Hasan (BUL) | 0

Quarterfinals
Saifedine Alekma (FRA) | 9
Alans Amirovs (LAT) | 8
Andrei Karpach (BLR) | 4
Rashad Yusifli (AZE) | 7

Semifinals
Saifedine Alekma (FRA) | 6
Rashad Yusifli (AZE) | 1

=== Repechage ===
Repechage round 2
Dejan Mitrov (MKD) | 1
Arman Avagyan (ARM) | 12
Osman Hajdari (ALB) | 0
Alans Amirovs (LAT) | 10

Bronze medal match
Arman Avagyan (ARM) | 0
Nika Kentchadze (GEO) | 10
Alans Amirovs (LAT) | 4
Rashad Yusifli (AZE) | 3

== Final standing ==
| Rank | Athlete |
|---|---|
| 1st place, gold medalist(s) | Achsarbek Gulajev (SVK) |
| 2nd place, silver medalist(s) | Saifedine Alekma (FRA) |
| 3rd place, bronze medalist(s) | Nika Kentchadze (GEO) |
| 3rd place, bronze medalist(s) | Alans Amirovs (LAT) |
| 5 | Arman Avagyan (ARM) |
| 5 | Rashad Yusifli (AZE) |
| 7 | Andrei Karpach (BLR) |
| 8 | Malik Shavaev (RUS) |
| 9 | Oktay Hasan (BUL) |
| 10 | Valentyn Babii (UKR) |
| 11 | Erik Reinbok (EST) |
| 12 | Dejan Mitrov (MKD) |
| 13 | Salvatore Diana (ITA) |
| 14 | Eugeniu Mihalcean (MDA) |
| 15 | Andrzej Sokalski (POL) |
| 16 | Eduard Tatarinov (GER) |
| 17 | Muhammet Nuri Kotanoğlu (TUR) |
| 18 | Osman Hajdari (ALB) |
