= Georgios Kougioumtsidis =

Greek freestyle wrestler (born 2001)

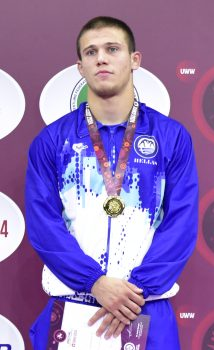
- Kougioumtsidis at the 2024 European U23 Wrestling Championships
- Born: Γιώργος Κουγιουμτσίδης; 9 October 2001 (age 25); Thessaloniki, Greece
- Height: 1.80 m (5 ft 11 in)
- Weight: 79 kg (174 lb; 12 st 6 lb)
- Division: Welterweight (MMA); 79 kg (wrestling)
- Style: Freestyle wrestling
- Trainer: Themis Iakovidis
- Years active: 2016–present

Mixed martial arts record
- Total: 1
- Wins: 1
- By decision: 1
- Losses: 0

Other information
- University: University of Macedonia
- Mixed martial arts record from Sherdog

Georgios Kougioumtsidis (Greek: Γιώργος Κουγιουμτσίδης; born 9 October 2001) is a Greek freestyle wrestler and mixed martial artist.

He won the gold medal in the 79 kg event at the 2025 World Wrestling Championships held in Zagreb, Croatia. Kougioumtsidis also won the gold medal in the 79 kg event at the 2022 European Wrestling Championships held in Budapest, Hungary. He represented Greece at the 2024 Summer Olympics in Paris, France.

Kougioumtsidis is coached by his uncle, retired Greek wrestler Themis Iakovidis.

== Career ==
=== Wrestling ===
In March 2021, Kougioumtsidis competed at the European Qualification Tournament in Budapest, Hungary hoping to qualify for the 2020 Summer Olympics in Tokyo, Japan. In May 2021, he failed to qualify for the Olympics at the World Qualification Tournament held in Sofia, Bulgaria.

Kougioumtsidis competed in the 79 kg event at the 2021 World Wrestling Championships held in Oslo, Norway. He won his first two matches and he was then eliminated by eventual bronze medalist Nika Kentchadze of Georgia.

In March 2022, Kougioumtsidis won the gold medal in his event at the European U23 Wrestling Championship held in Plovdiv, Bulgaria. In that same month, he also won the gold medal in the 79 kg event at the 2022 European Wrestling Championships held in Budapest, Hungary. He competed in the 79 kg event at the 2022 World Wrestling Championships held in Belgrade, Serbia.

Kougioumtsidis lost his bronze medal match in the men's 79 kg event at the 2024 European Wrestling Championships held in Bucharest, Romania. He competed in the men's freestyle 74 kg event at the 2024 Summer Olympics in Paris, France.

He debuted for Real American Freestyle at RAF 09 on 30 May 2026, facing Parker Keckeisen. He lost by decision. This fight earned him a Match of the Night award.

=== Mixed martial arts ===
Kougioumtsidis made his mixed martial arts debut at Octagon Fighting 5 in Kilkis, Greece on 24 October 2020. He defeated Yoan Petrov in a Welterweight bout by unanimous decision.

== Achievements ==
Year	Tournament	Location	Result	Event
2022	European Championships	Budapest, Hungary	1st	Freestyle 79 kg
2023	European Championships	Zagreb, Croatia	2nd	Freestyle 79 kg
2025	World Championships	Zagreb, Croatia	1st	Freestyle 79 kg

== Mixed martial arts record ==
Professional record breakdown
1 match	1 win	0 losses
By decision	1	0

Res.	Record	Opponent	Method	Event	Date	Round	Time	Location	Notes
Win	1–0	Yoan Petrov	Decision (unanimous)	Octagon Fighting 5	October 24, 2020	3	5:00	Kilkis, Greece	Welterweight debut.
