= 2022 World Wrestling Championships – Men's freestyle 79 kg =

Wrestling competitions

Men's freestyle 79 kg at the 2022 World Championships
- Venue: Štark Arena
- Dates: 15–16 September 2022
- Competitors: 32 from 32 nations

Medalists
gold medal	Jordan Burroughs	United States
silver medal	Mohammad Nokhodi	Iran
bronze medal	Arsalan Budazhapov	Kyrgyzstan
bronze medal	Vasyl Mykhailov	Ukraine

The men's freestyle 79 kilograms was a competition featured at the 2022 World Wrestling Championships, and was held in Belgrade, Serbia on 15 and 16 September 2022.

This freestyle wrestling competition consisted of a single-elimination tournament, with a repechage used to determine the winner of two bronze medals. The two finalists faced off for gold and silver medals. Each wrestler who lost to one of the two finalists automatically moved into the repechage, culminating in a pair of bronze-medal matches featuring the semifinal losers each facing the remaining repechage opponent from their half of the bracket.

== Results ==
Legend

- WO — Won by walkover

=== Final ===
Final
Jordan Burroughs (USA)	4
Mohammad Nokhodi (IRI)	2

=== Top half ===
Round of 32
Jordan Burroughs (USA)	12
Şähergeldi Saparmyradow (TKM)	1
Dejan Mitrov (MKD)	3
Csaba Vida (HUN)	2
Ştefan Canţîr (MDA)	2
Shuhrat Bozorov (TJK)	11
Arsalan Budazhapov (KGZ)	2
Saifedine Alekma (FRA)	2
Vladimeri Gamkrelidze (GEO)	11
Xia Shengsong (CHN)	0
Achsarbek Gulajev (SVK)	2
Ali-Pasha Umarpashaev (BUL)	3
Assane Ballo (CIV)
Yudai Takahashi (JPN)	WO
Adam Thomson (CAN)	0
Arman Avagyan (ARM)	11

Round of 16
Jordan Burroughs (USA)	12
Dejan Mitrov (MKD)	1
Shuhrat Bozorov (TJK)	0
Arsalan Budazhapov (KGZ)	10
Vladimeri Gamkrelidze (GEO)	0
Ali-Pasha Umarpashaev (BUL)	10
Yudai Takahashi (JPN)	7
Arman Avagyan (ARM)	6

Quarterfinals
Jordan Burroughs (USA)	10
Arsalan Budazhapov (KGZ)	0
Ali-Pasha Umarpashaev (BUL)	5
Yudai Takahashi (JPN)	3

Semifinals
Jordan Burroughs (USA)	9
Ali-Pasha Umarpashaev (BUL)	2

=== Bottom half ===
Round of 32
Georgios Kougioumtsidis (GRE)	3
Alans Amirovs (LAT)	1
Seo Bum-gue (KOR)	14
Kornelijus Stulginskas (LTU)	3
Vasyl Mykhailov (UKR)	6
Bolat Sakayev (KAZ)	4
Erik Reinbok (EST)	2
Ashraf Ashirov (AZE)	5
Muhammet Akdeniz (TUR)	3
Bekzod Abdurakhmonov (UZB)	10
Deepak Mirka (IND)	10
Dan Tsesarsky (ISR)	0
Altanzulyn Dölgöön (MGL)	12
Andy Mukendi (COD)	2
Iakub Shikhdzamalov (ROU)	6
Mohammad Nokhodi (IRI)	7

Round of 16
Georgios Kougioumtsidis (GRE)	12
Seo Bum-gue (KOR)	1
Vasyl Mykhailov (UKR)	7
Ashraf Ashirov (AZE)	1
Bekzod Abdurakhmonov (UZB)	13
Deepak Mirka (IND)	2
Altanzulyn Dölgöön (MGL)	0
Mohammad Nokhodi (IRI)	10

Quarterfinals
Georgios Kougioumtsidis (GRE)	0
Vasyl Mykhailov (UKR)	10
Bekzod Abdurakhmonov (UZB)	5
Mohammad Nokhodi (IRI)	10

Semifinals
Vasyl Mykhailov (UKR)	4
Mohammad Nokhodi (IRI)	5

=== Repechage ===
Repechage round 1
Şähergeldi Saparmyradow (TKM)	10
Dejan Mitrov (MKD)	1
Iakub Shikhdzamalov (ROU)	9
Altanzulyn Dölgöön (MGL)	7

Repechage round 2
Şähergeldi Saparmyradow (TKM)	0
Arsalan Budazhapov (KGZ)	10
Iakub Shikhdzamalov (ROU)	1
Bekzod Abdurakhmonov (UZB)	8

Bronze medals
Arsalan Budazhapov (KGZ)	5
Ali-Pasha Umarpashaev (BUL)	1
Bekzod Abdurakhmonov (UZB)	3
Vasyl Mykhailov (UKR)	5

== Final standing ==
Rank	Athlete
1st place, gold medalist(s)	Jordan Burroughs (USA)
2nd place, silver medalist(s)	Mohammad Nokhodi (IRI)
3rd place, bronze medalist(s)	Arsalan Budazhapov (KGZ)
3rd place, bronze medalist(s)	Vasyl Mykhailov (UKR)
5	Ali-Pasha Umarpashaev (BUL)
5	Bekzod Abdurakhmonov (UZB)
7	Yudai Takahashi (JPN)
8	Georgios Kougioumtsidis (GRE)
9	Altanzulyn Dölgöön (MGL)
10	Arman Avagyan (ARM)
11	Seo Bum-gue (KOR)
12	Deepak Mirka (IND)
13	Iakub Shikhdzamalov (ROU)
14	Dejan Mitrov (MKD)
15	Vladimeri Gamkrelidze (GEO)
16	Şähergeldi Saparmyradow (TKM)
17	Ashraf Ashirov (AZE)
18	Shuhrat Bozorov (TJK)
19	Bolat Sakayev (KAZ)
20	Muhammet Akdeniz (TUR)
21	Kornelijus Stulginskas (LTU)
22	Saifedine Alekma (FRA)
23	Csaba Vida (HUN)
24	Achsarbek Gulajev (SVK)
25	Erik Reinbok (EST)
26	Ştefan Canţîr (MDA)
27	Andy Mukendi (COD)
28	Alans Amirovs (LAT)
29	Assane Ballo (CIV)
30	Dan Tsesarsky (ISR)
31	Xia Shengsong (CHN)
32	Adam Thomson (CAN)
