= 2020 Individual Wrestling World Cup – Men's freestyle 79 kg =

The men's freestyle 79 kilograms is a competition featured at the 2020 Individual Wrestling World Cup, and was held in Belgrade, Serbia on 17 and 18 December 2020.

== Medalists ==
Gold	Akhmed Usmanov; Russia
Silver	Muhammet Nuri Kotanoğlu; Turkey
Bronze	Mahamedkhabib Kadzimahamedau; Belarus
Bronze	Vasyl Mykhailov; Ukraine

== Results ==
Legend

- F — Won by fall

1/16 finals
	Score	
Muhammet Nuri Kotanoğlu (TUR)	5–2	Rashad Yusifli (AZE)
Arsalan Budazhapov (KGZ)	6–2	Arman Avagyan (ARM)
Csaba Vida (HUN)	8–10	Achsarbek Gulajev (SVK)

1/8 finals
Alans Amirovs (LAT)	11
Stanislav Novac (MDA)	4
Aron Caneva (ITA)	0
Gourav Baliyan (IND)	7^{F}
Erik Reinbok (EST)	0
Akhmed Usmanov (RUS)	10
Dzhemal Ali (BUL)	0
Mahamedkhabib Kadzimahamedau (BLR)	7
Ayoub Barraj (TUN)	0
Vasyl Mykhailov (UKR)	4
Eduard Tatarinov (GER)	1
Rashid Kurbanov (UZB)	6
Mădălin Mînzală (ROU)	1
Muhammet Nuri Kotanoğlu (TUR)	7
Arsalan Budazhapov (KGZ)	4
Achsarbek Gulajev (SVK)	5

Quarterfinals
Alans Amirovs (LAT)	10
Gourav Baliyan (IND)	17
Akhmed Usmanov (RUS)	4
Mahamedkhabib Kadzimahamedau (BLR)	1
Vasyl Mykhailov (UKR)	4
Rashid Kurbanov (UZB)	2
Muhammet Nuri Kotanoğlu (TUR)	11
Achsarbek Gulajev (SVK)	0

Semifinals
Gourav Baliyan (IND)	0
Akhmed Usmanov (RUS)	10
Vasyl Mykhailov (UKR)	4
Muhammet Nuri Kotanoğlu (TUR)	4

Final
Akhmed Usmanov (RUS)	11
Muhammet Nuri Kotanoğlu (TUR)	0

Repechage round 1
Rashad Yusifli (AZE)	10
Mădălin Mînzală (ROU)	0

Repechage round 2
Erik Reinbok (EST)	0
Mahamedkhabib Kadzimahamedau (BLR)	10
Rashad Yusifli (AZE)	3
Achsarbek Gulajev (SVK)	3

Bronze medals
Mahamedkhabib Kadzimahamedau (BLR)	14
Gourav Baliyan (IND)	1
Achsarbek Gulajev (SVK)	2
Vasyl Mykhailov (UKR)	3
