= Ibragim Ibragimov =

Russian freestyle wrestler (born 2001)

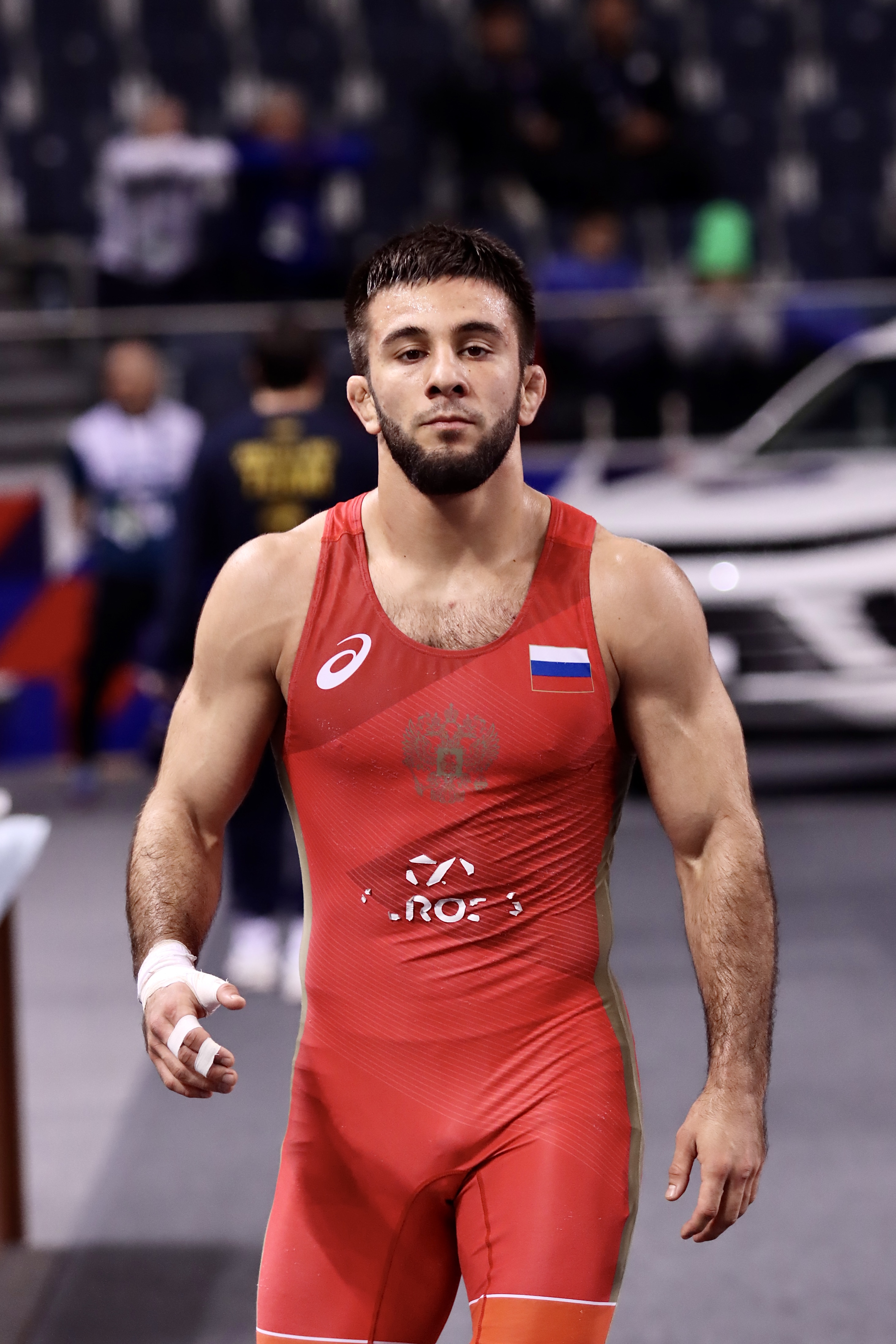
- Ibragimov in 2023

Personal information
- Native name: Ибрагим Шарапуттинович Ибрагимов
- Full name: Ibragim Sharaputtinovich Ibragimov
- Nationality: Russia
- Born: 4 March 2001 (age 25) Kaspiysk, Dagestan, Russia
- Height: 169 cm (5 ft 7 in)

Sport
- Country: Russia
- Sport: Wrestling
- Weight class: 65 kg
- Rank: Master of sports
- Event: Freestyle
- Club: Gamid Gamidov wrestling club
- Coached by: Anvar Magomedgadzhiev

Achievements and titles
- World finals: (gold) (2026)
- Regional finals: (gold) (2025)
- National finals: (gold) (2022)
Medal record
Men's freestyle wrestling
Representing the Russia
World Championships
Gold medal – first place	2026 Astana	70 kg
Representing UWW
European Championships
Gold medal – first place	2025 Bratislava	65 kg
Grand Prix
Bronze medal – third place	2026 Tirana	70 kg
Representing Individual Neutral Athletes
World U23 Championships
Gold medal – first place	2023 Tirana	65 kg
Gold medal – first place	2024 Tirana	65 kg
European U23 Championships
Gold medal – first place	2024 Baku	65 kg
Representing Dagestan
Golden Grand Prix Ivan Yarygin
Gold medal – first place	2025 Krasnoyarsk	65 kg
Silver medal – second place	2026 Krasnoyarsk	65 kg
Bronze medal – third place	2022 Krasnoyarsk	65 kg
Bronze medal – third place	2023 Krasnoyarsk	65 kg
Russian National Championships
Gold medal – first place	2022 Kyzyl	65 kg
Gold medal – first place	2025 Moscow	65 kg
Gold medal – first place	2026 Moscow	70 kg
Silver medal – second place	2023 Kaspiysk	65 kg
Bronze medal – third place	2024 Novoivanovskoye	65 kg

Ibragim Sharaputtinovich Ibragimov (Russian: Ибрагим Шарапуттинович Ибрагимов; born 4 March 2001) is a Russian freestyle wrestler of Lak ethnicity, who claimed gold medals at the 2023 and 2024 U23 World Championships. In 2022, he became a Russian national champion at 65 kilos.

== Background ==
Ibragimov was born in Kaspiysk, Dagestan, Russia. He started wrestling at age of 10 in Vladimir Yumin wrestling club in Kaspiysk. At age of 17 he jointed to Gamid Gamidov wrestling club and being coached by Anvar Magomedgadzhiev.

== Career ==
=== 2021 ===
On October 3, he won a bronze medal at the U23 Russian championships.

=== 2022 ===
In the beginning of 2022 he finished third at the 2022 Yarygin grand prix, in the bronze medal match he beat NCAA Division I finalist Joseph McKenna of Ohio State. On June 26, he became Russian national champion at 65 kg. On September 16, Ibragimov came in the first place at the Alexander Medved grand prix in Belarus. On October 14, he won Poddybny wrestling league 2 On November 13, he took a bronze medal at the Vladimir Semenov cup.

=== 2023 ===
On January 27, he earned a bronze medal at the Ivan Yarygin grand prix again. On April 30, he became finalist of the Baikal open international tournament. At the Russian Championships held in Kaspiysk, Dagestan he lost to Shamil Mamedov in final match. On August 9, he won the first place at the CIS Games. At the U23 World Championships he claimed gold medal.

=== 2024 ===
On May 1, Ibragimdov earned a bronze medal from the senior National Championships at 65 kilos. On May 25, he finished in first place at the U23 European Championships. In October 2024, he won his second U23 world title in Tirana, Albania. In the final match, Ibragimov over Japan's Kaiji Ogino via technical superiority.

=== 2025 ===
On January 25, he won Ivan Yarygin tournament at 65 kilos.

=== 2026 ===
At the 2026 World Wrestling Championships held in Astana, Kazakhstan, Russian freestyle wrestler Ibragim Ibragimov won the gold medal in the men's 70 kg category. In the final, he defeated Ernazar Akmataliev of Kyrgyzstan by a score of 5–2.

== Championships and achievements ==
- 2021 U23 Russian championships — 3rd.
- 2022, 2023 Ivan Yarygin GP — 3rd.
- 2022 Russian nationals — 1st.
- 2023 Russian nationals — 2nd.
- 2023 CIS Games — 1st.
- 2023, 2024 U23 World championships — 1st.
- 2024 Russian nationals — 3rd.
- 2024 U23 European championships — 1st.
- 2025 Ivan Yarygin GP — 1st.
- 2025 Russian nationals — 1st.

== Social media ==
- Ibragim Ibragimov on Instagram
