= Muhammet Akdeniz =

Turkish freestyle wrestler

Personal information
- Nationality: Turkish
- Born: 20 November 1995 (age 30) Bayburt, Turkey
- Height: 1.75 m (5 ft 9 in)
- Weight: 79 kg (174 lb; 12.4 st)

Sport
- Country: Turkey
- Sport: Amateur wrestling
- Event: Freestyle
- Club: Ankara İlbank
Medal record
Men's freestyle wrestling
Representing Turkey
European Championships
| Bronze medal – third place | 2022 Budapest | 79 kg |
Islamic Solidarity Games
| Silver medal – second place | 2021 Konya | 79 kg |
Yasar Dogu Tournament
| Gold medal – first place | 2023 Istanbul | 79 kg |
World U23 Championships
| Bronze medal – third place | 2017 Bydgoszcz | 70 kg |
European U23 Championship
| Bronze medal – third place | 2016 Russe | 70 kg |
World University Championship
| Gold medal – first place | 2018 Goiana | 74 kg |

Muhammet Akdeniz (born 20 November 1995) is a Turkish freestyle wrestler competing in the 79 kg division. He is a member of Ankara İlbank.

== Career ==
In 2022, he won one of the bronze medals in the men's 79 kg event at the 2022 European Wrestling Championships held in Budapest, Hungary. Muhammet Akdeniz reached the semifinals by beating Stanislav Novac of Moldova 6-1 in the first round and Saifedine Alekma of France 5-3 in the quarterfinals. In the semifinals, he lost to the Greek Georgios Kougioumtsidis, and in the third place match he defeated the Latvian Alans Amirovs 8-4 to win the bronze medal. He won the silver medal in the men's 79 kg event at the 2021 Islamic Solidarity Games held in Konya, Turkey. He competed in the 79 kg event at the 2022 World Wrestling Championships held in Belgrade, Serbia.

== Achievements ==
| Year | Tournament | Location | Result | Event |
|---|---|---|---|---|
| 2022 | European Championships | Budapest, Hungary | 3rd | Freestyle 79 kg |
| 2022 | Islamic Solidarity Games | Konya, Turkey | 2nd | Freestyle 79 kg |
