= Aygehovit =

Aygehovit Այգեհովիտ
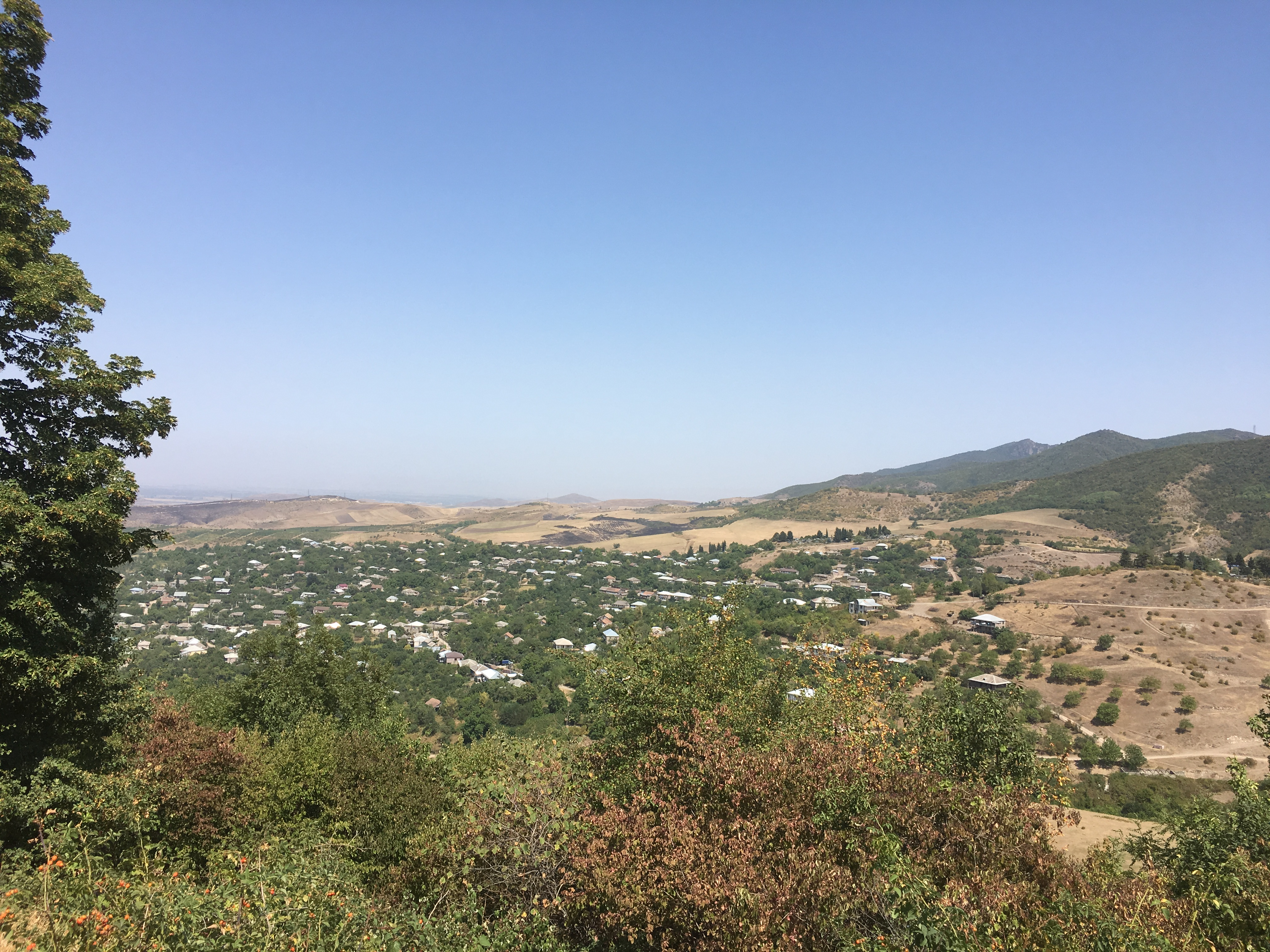
- A view of Aygehovit

- Location within Armenia Location within Tavush
- Coordinates: 40°58′28″N 45°15′07″E
- Country: Armenia
- Province: Tavush
- Municipality: Ijevan
- Elevation: 814 m (2,671 ft)

Population (2011)
  - Total: 3,091
- Time zone: UTC+4 (AMT)

Aygehovit (Armenian: Այգեհովիտ) is a village in the Ijevan Municipality of the Tavush Province of Armenia.

== Toponymy ==
The village was previously known as Uzuntala and Onut.

== Notable people ==
- Narek Oganian, Russian Greco-Roman wrestler of Armenian descent

== Gallery ==
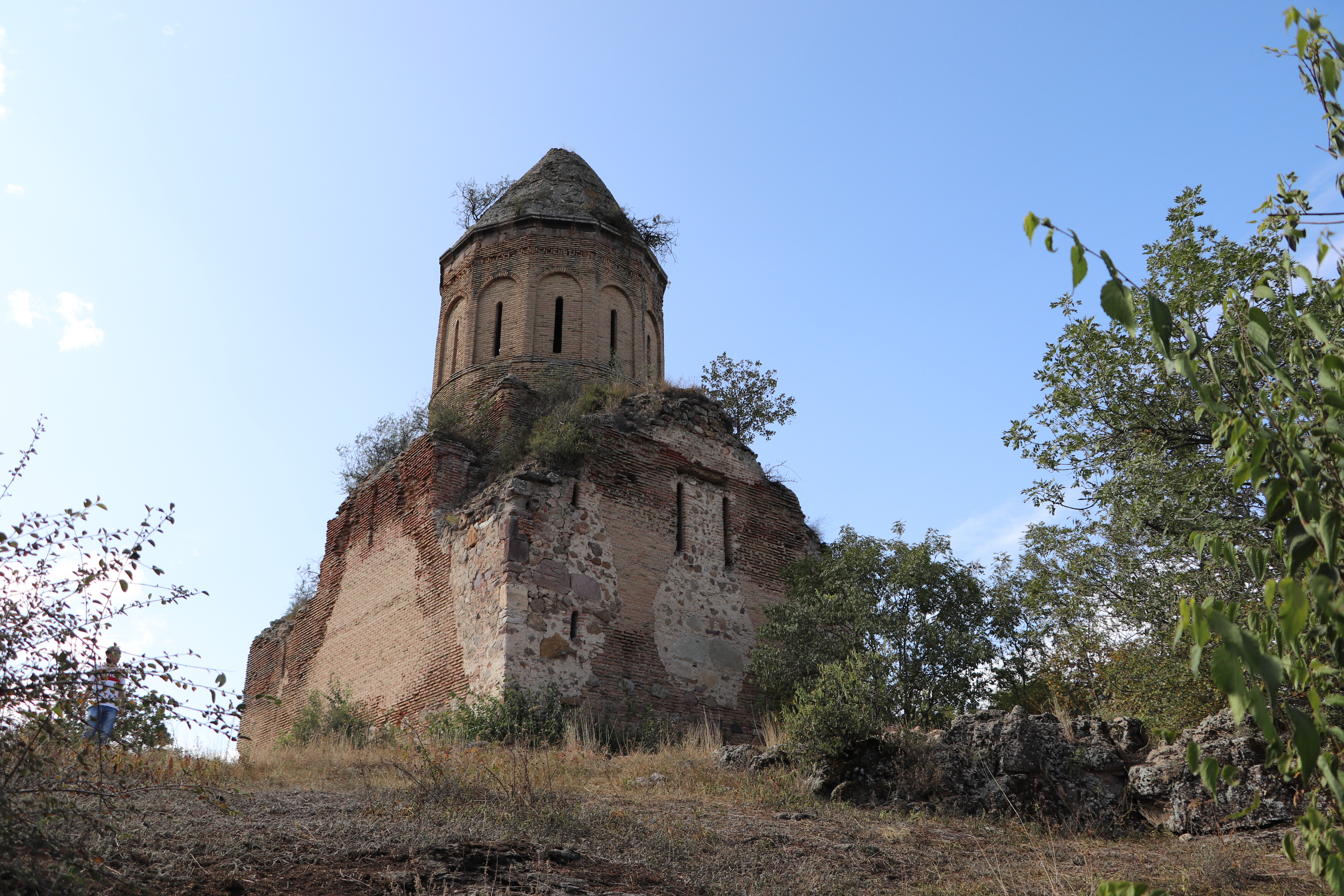
Srvegh Monastery near Aygehovit

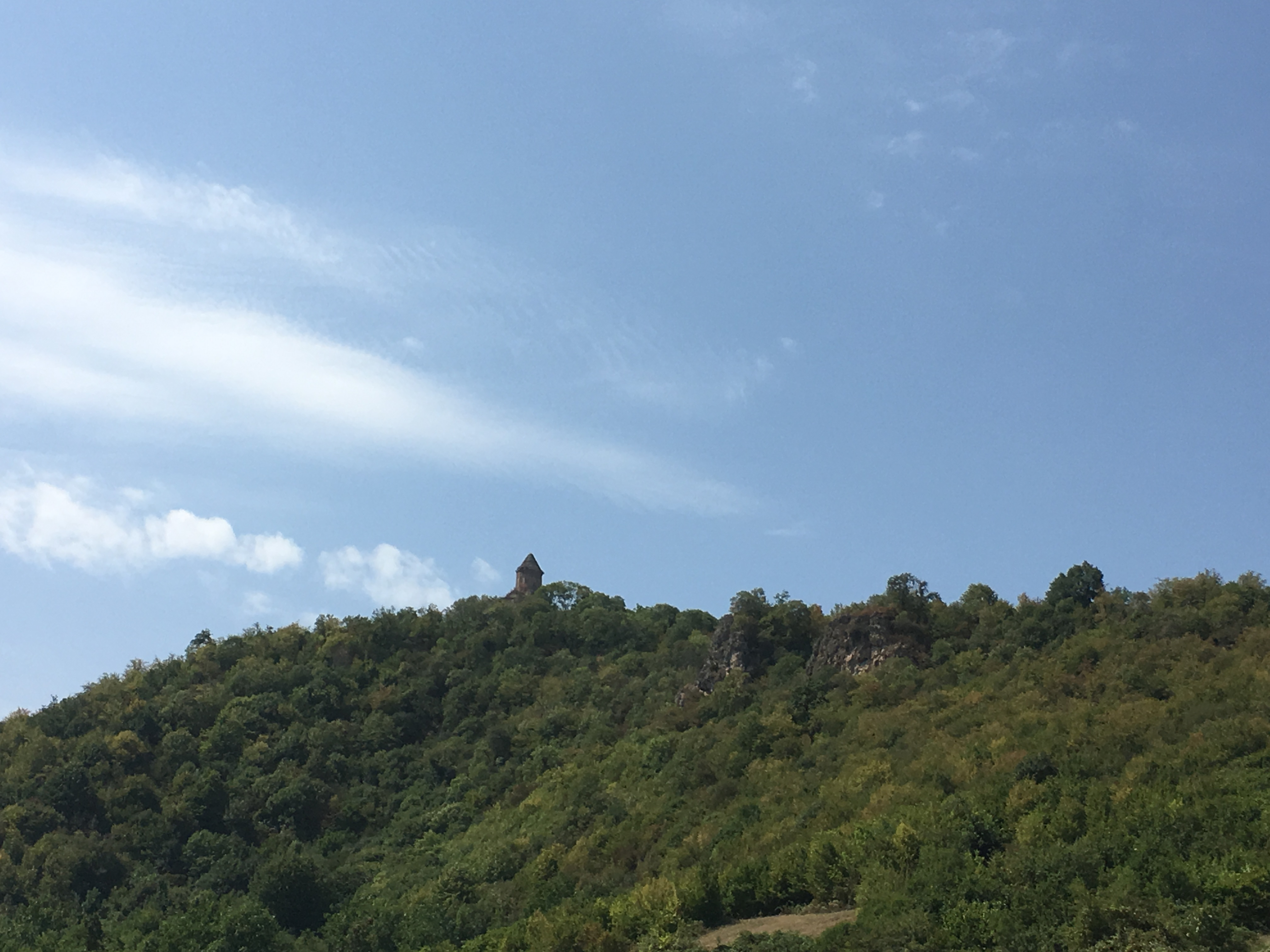
Scenery around Srvegh Monastery

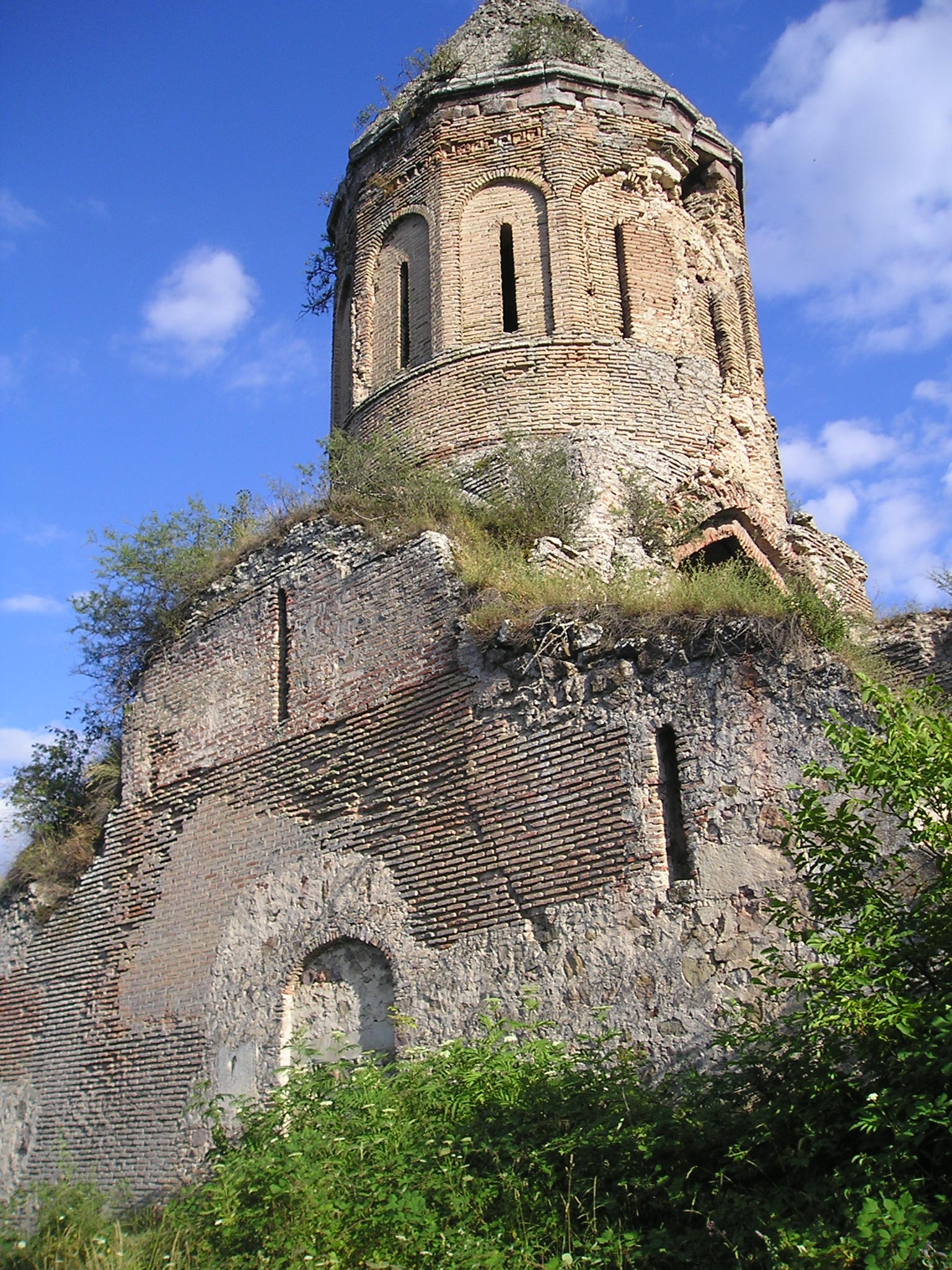
Srvegh Monastery

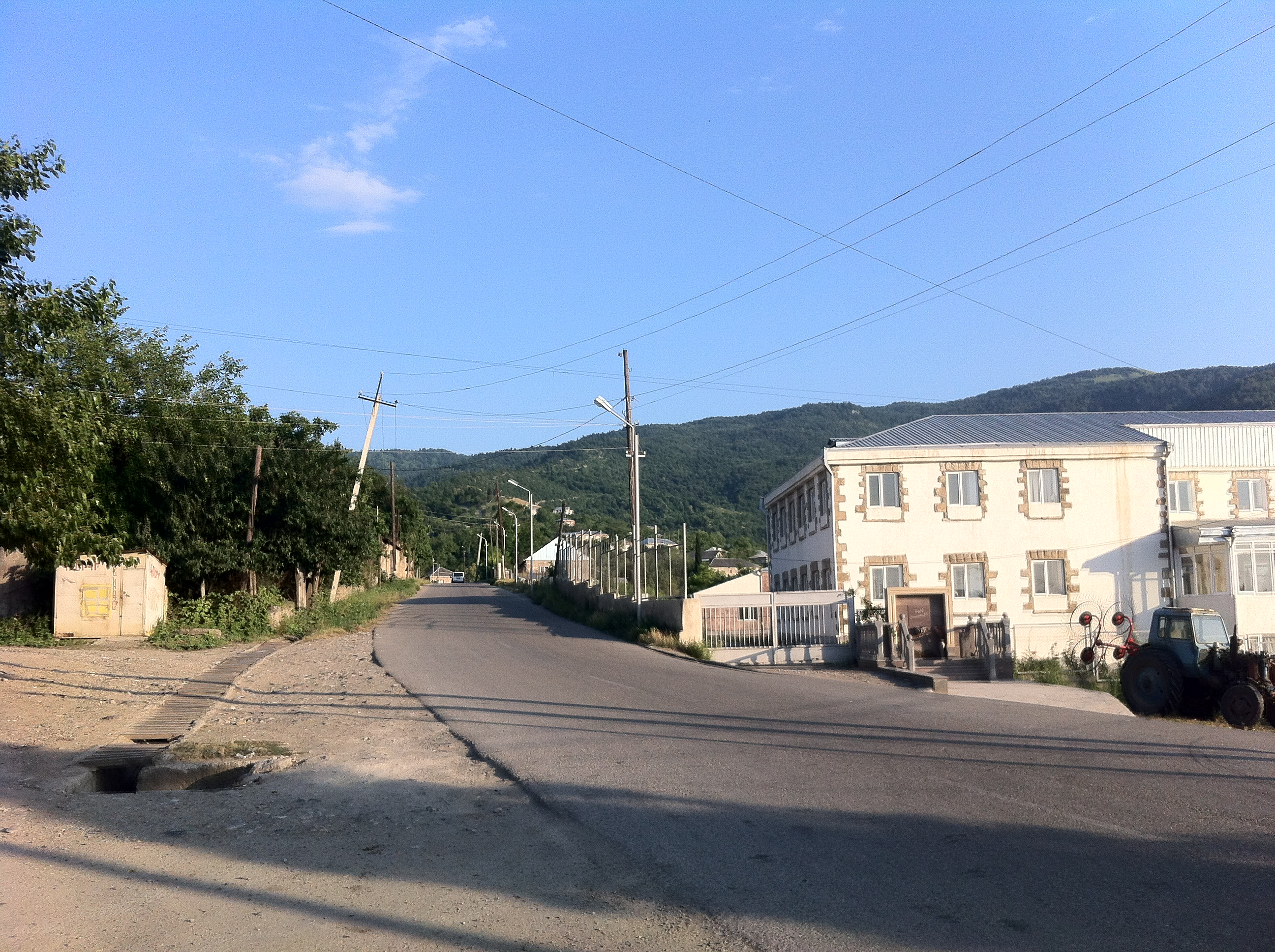
Street in Aygehovit

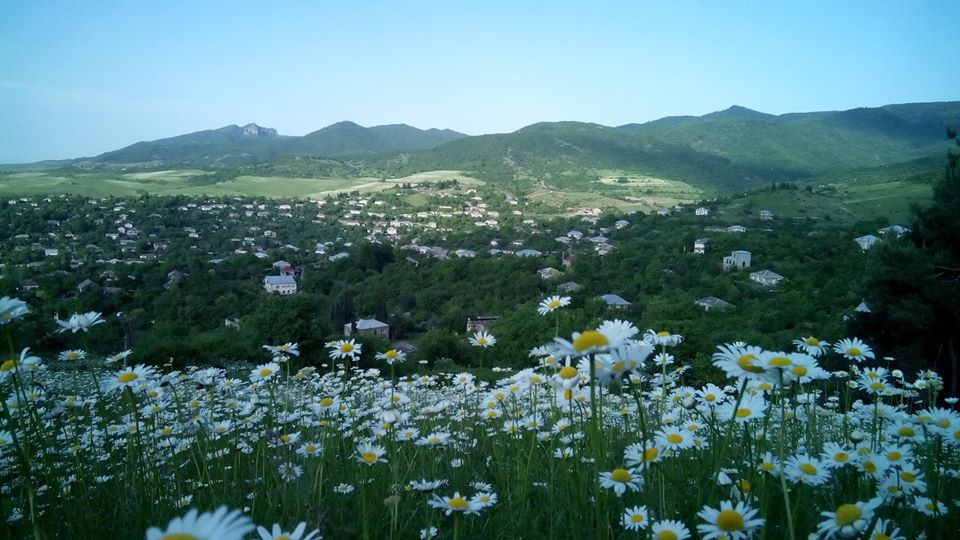
A view of Aygehovit

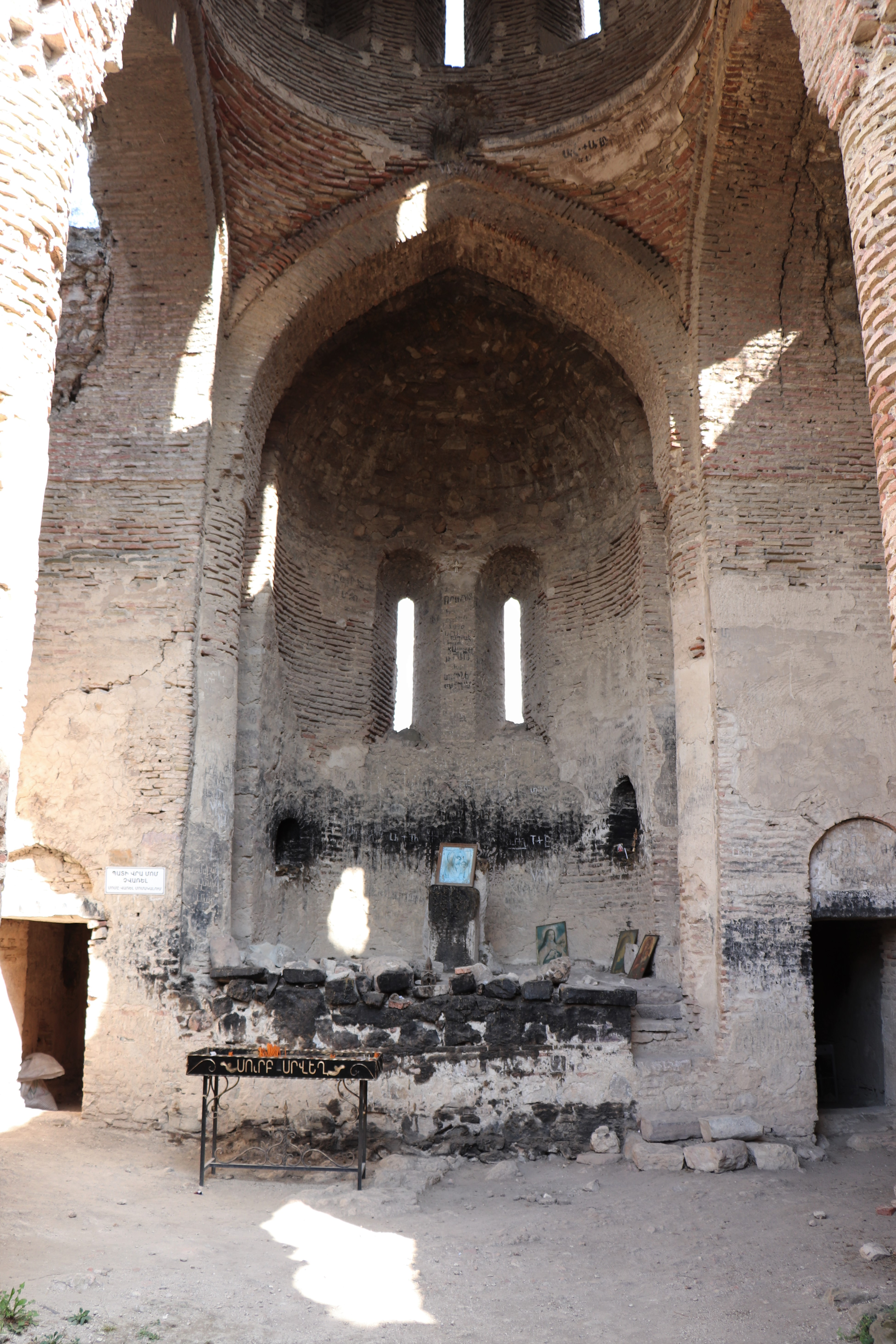
Srvegh Monastery interior
