= Arsalan Budazhapov =

Kyrgyzstani freestyle wrestler

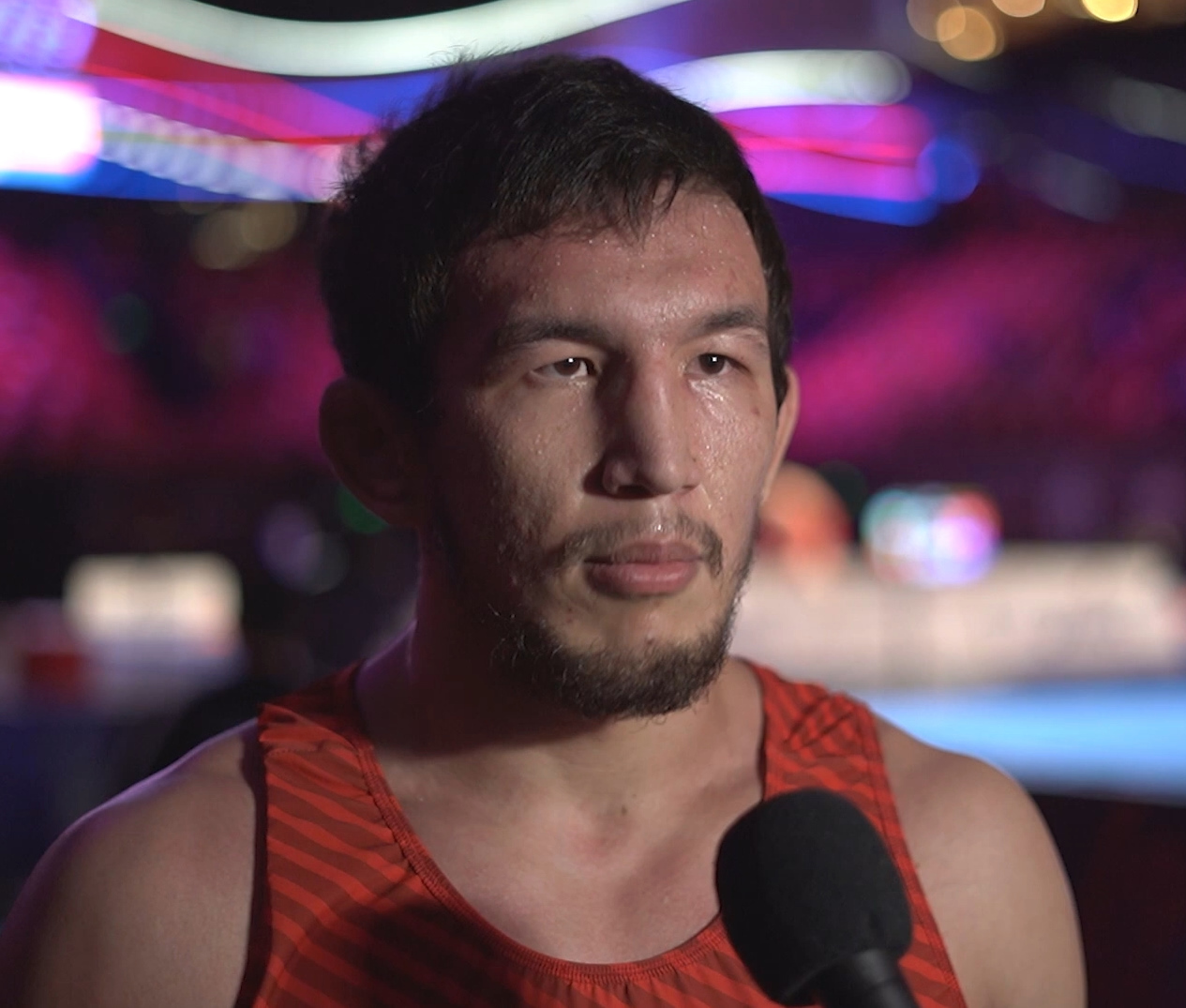
- Arsalan Budazhapov in 2020

Personal information
- Full name: Arsalan Bairovich Budazhapov
- Nationality: Russia
- Born: Арсалан Баирович Будажапов; 21 May 1993 (age 33) Tsokto-Khangil, Zabaykalsky Krai, Russia
- Height: 175 cm (5 ft 9 in)

Sport
- Country: Kyrgyzstan (2020–present); Russia (2012–2019)
- Sport: Amateur wrestling
- Weight class: 79 kg
- Event: Freestyle

Achievements and titles
- World finals: (bronze) (2022)
- Regional finals: (gold) (2020) (bronze) (2022)
Medal record
Men's freestyle wrestling
Representing Kyrgyzstan
World Championships
| Bronze medal – third place | 2022 Belgrade | 79 kg |
Asian Championships
| Gold medal – first place | 2020 New Delhi | 79 kg |
| Bronze medal – third place | 2022 Ulaanbaatar | 79 kg |
Golden Grand Prix Ivan Yarygin
| Bronze medal – third place | 2021 Krasnoyarsk | 79 kg |
Yasar Dogu Tournament
| Bronze medal – third place | 2022 Istanbul | 79 kg |
Representing All-World Team
World Cup
| Bronze medal – third place | 2022 Coralville | Team |

Arsalan Budazhapov is a Russian-born Kyrgyzstani freestyle wrestler. He won one of the bronze medals in the men's 79 kg event at the 2022 World Wrestling Championships held in Belgrade, Serbia. He is also a two-time medalist, including gold, at the Asian Wrestling Championships.

== Career ==
He competed in the men's 79 kg event at the 2020 Individual Wrestling World Cup held in Belgrade, Serbia. In 2021, he failed to qualify for the 2020 Summer Olympics at the World Qualification Tournament held in Sofia, Bulgaria. He competed in the 79 kg event at the 2021 World Wrestling Championships held in Oslo, Norway where he was eliminated in his first match.

In 2022, he won one of the bronze medals in his event at the Yasar Dogu Tournament held in Istanbul, Turkey. He also competed at the 2021 Islamic Solidarity Games held in Konya, Turkey.

== Achievements ==
| Year | Tournament | Location | Result | Event |
|---|---|---|---|---|
| 2020 | Asian Championships | New Delhi, India | 1st | Freestyle 79 kg |
| 2022 | Asian Championships | Ulaanbaatar, Mongolia | 3rd | Freestyle 79 kg |
| 2022 | World Championships | Belgrade, Serbia | 3rd | Freestyle 79 kg |
