= 2025 European Wrestling Championships – Men's freestyle 65 kg =

Wrestling competition

Men's freestyle 65 kg at the 2025 European Wrestling Championships
- Venue: X-Bionic Sphere
- Location: Bratislava, Slovakia
- Dates: 7-8 April
- Competitors: 17

Medalists
| gold medal | Ibragim Ibragimov |
| silver medal | Khamzat Arsamerzouev | France |
| bronze medal | Vazgen Tevanyan | Armenia |
| bronze medal | Ali Rahimzade | Azerbaijan |

The men's freestyle 65 kg is a competition featured at the 2025 European Wrestling Championships, and was held in Bratislava, Slovakia on April 7 and 8.

== Results ==
Legend

- F — Won by fall

=== Final ===
| Final |
| Ibragim Ibragimov (UWW) | 3 |
| Khamzat Arsamerzouev (FRA) | 0 |

=== Top half ===
Round of 32
Krzysztof Bieńkowski (POL) | 0
Ibragim Ibragimov (UWW) | 10

Round of 16
Vazgen Tevanyan (ARM) | 3
Islam Guseinov (UWW) | 0
Ibragim Ibragimov (UWW) | 10
Mikyay Naim (BUL) | 0
Goga Otinashvili (GEO) | 12
Carlos Álvarez (ESP) | 2
Cabbar Duyum (TUR) | 8
Sergiu Lupașco (MDA) | 5

Quarterfinals
Vazgen Tevanyan (ARM) | 2
Ibragim Ibragimov (UWW) | 3
Goga Otinashvili (GEO) | 9
Cabbar Duyum (TUR) | 0

Semifinals
Ibragim Ibragimov (UWW) | 11
Goga Otinashvili (GEO) | 0

=== Bottom half ===
Round of 32

Round of 16
Ali Rahimzade (AZE) | 7
Ayub Musaev (BEL) | 2
Nico Megerle (GER) | 5
Colin Realbuto (ITA) | 3
Andrii Svyryd (UKR) | 14
Zoltán Mizsei (HUN) | 3
Ștefan Coman (ROU) | 2
Khamzat Arsamerzouev (FRA) | 11^{F}

Quarterfinals
Ali Rahimzade (AZE) | 10
Nico Megerle (GER) | 0
Andrii Svyryd (UKR) | 1
Khamzat Arsamerzouev (FRA) | 2

Semifinals
Ali Rahimzade (AZE) | 3
Khamzat Arsamerzouev (FRA) | 4

=== Repechage ===
Repechage round 1
Krzysztof Bieńkowski (POL) | 7
Mikyay Naim (BUL) | 2

Repechage round 2
Krzysztof Bieńkowski (POL) | 0
Vazgen Tevanyan (ARM) | 3
Ștefan Coman (ROU)
Andrii Svyryd (UKR) | WO

Bronze medal match
Vazgen Tevanyan (ARM) | WO
~~Goga Otinashvili (GEO)~~
Andrii Svyryd (UKR) | 0
Ali Rahimzade (AZE) | 4

== Final standing ==
| Rank | Athlete |
|---|---|
| 1st place, gold medalist(s) | Ibragim Ibragimov (UWW) |
| 2nd place, silver medalist(s) | Khamzat Arsamerzouev (FRA) |
| 3rd place, bronze medalist(s) | Vazgen Tevanyan (ARM) |
| 3rd place, bronze medalist(s) | Ali Rahimzade (AZE) |
| 5 | Andrii Svyryd (UKR) |
| 6 | Cabbar Duyum (TUR) |
| 7 | Krzysztof Bieńkowski (POL) |
| 8 | Nico Megerle (GER) |
| 9 | Sergiu Lupașco (MDA) |
| 10 | Colin Realbuto (ITA) |
| 11 | Zoltán Mizsei (HUN) |
| 12 | Ayub Musaev (BEL) |
| 13 | Carlos Álvarez (ESP) |
| 14 | Mikyay Naim (BUL) |
| 15 | Ștefan Coman (ROU) |
| 16 | Islam Guseinov (UWW) |
| — | Goga Otinashvili (GEO) |
