= 2019 European Wrestling Championships – Men's freestyle 79 kg =

The men's freestyle 79 kg is a competition featured at the 2019 European Wrestling Championships, and was held in Bucharest, Romania on April 8 and April 9.

== Medalists ==
| Gold | Jabrayil Hasanov; Azerbaijan |
| Silver | Akhmed Gadzhimagomedov; Russia |
| Bronze | Muhammet Nuri Kotanoğlu; Turkey |
| Bronze | Nika Kentchadze; Georgia |

== Results ==
Legend

- F — Won by fall
- WO — Won by walkover

=== Main Bracket ===
Round of 16
Grigor Grigoryan (ARM) | 1
Omaraskhab Nazhmudinov (ROU) | 10^{F}
Jabrayil Hasanov (AZE) | 6
Nika Kentchadze (GEO) | 5
Alexandru Burcă (MDA) | 2
Franco Büttner (GER) | 6

Quarterfinals
Akhmed Gadzhimagomedov (RUS) | 10
Muhammet Nuri Kotanoğlu (TUR) | 0
Oleksii Domanytskyi (UKR) | 12
Dan Or Tsesarsky (ISR) | 0
Andrei Karpach (BLR) | 10
Omaraskhab Nazhmudinov (ROU) | 6
Jabrayil Hasanov (AZE) | 12
Franco Büttner (GER) | 1

Semifinals
Akhmed Gadzhimagomedov (RUS) | 7
Oleksii Domanytskyi (UKR) | 0
Andrei Karpach (BLR) | 4
Jabrayil Hasanov (AZE) | 9

Final
Akhmed Gadzhimagomedov (RUS)
Jabrayil Hasanov (AZE) | WO

=== Repechage ===
Repechage round 1
Nika Kentchadze (GEO) | 7
Franco Büttner (GER) | 2

Bronze medal match
Muhammet Nuri Kotanoğlu (TUR) | 5
Oleksii Domanytskyi (UKR) | 1
Nika Kentchadze (GEO) | 7
Andrei Karpach (BLR) | 1
