= 2024 European Wrestling Championships – Men's Greco-Roman 72 kg =

Wrestling competition

Men's Greco-Roman 72 kg at the 2024 European Wrestling Championships
- Venue: Polyvalent Hall
- Location: Bucharest, Romania
- Dates: 13-14 February
- Competitors: 19

Medalists
gold medal	Selçuk Can	Turkey
silver medal	Ulvu Ganizade	Azerbaijan
bronze medal	Narek Oganian	Individual Neutral Athletes
bronze medal	Parviz Nasibov	Ukraine

The Men's Greco-Roman 72 kg is a competition featured at the 2024 European Wrestling Championships, and was held in Bucharest, Romania on February 13 and 14.

== Results ==
Legend

- F — Won by fall
- R — Retired

=== Final ===
Final
Selçuk Can (TUR)	2
Ulvu Ganizade (AZE)	0

=== Top half ===
Round of 32
Deyvid Dimitrov (BUL)	0
Daniel Cataraga (MDA)	8

Round of 16
Selçuk Can (TUR)	3
István Váncza (HUN)	1
Daniel Cataraga (MDA)	9
Iulian Lungu (ROU)	0
Michael Portmann (SUI)	1
Narek Oganian (AIN)	6
Shant Khachatryan (ARM)	3
Dominik Etlinger (CRO)	6

Quarterfinals
Selçuk Can (TUR)	11
Daniel Cataraga (MDA)	1
Narek Oganian (AIN)	5
Dominik Etlinger (CRO)	0

Semifinals
Selçuk Can (TUR)	6
Narek Oganian (AIN)	0

=== Bottom half ===
Round of 32
Aliaksandr Liavonchyk (AIN)	3
Parviz Nasibov (UKR)	4
Mamadassa Sylla (FRA)	8
Gevorg Sahakyan (POL)	0

Round of 16
Michael Widmayer (GER)	1
Matias Lipasti (FIN)	1
Parviz Nasibov (UKR)	3
Mate Nemeš (SRB)	1^{R}
Håvard Jørgensen (NOR)	1
Mamadassa Sylla (FRA)	3
Giorgi Chkhikvadze (GEO)	1
Ulvu Ganizade (AZE)	2

Quarterfinals
Matias Lipasti (FIN)	0
Parviz Nasibov (UKR)	9
Mamadassa Sylla (FRA)	3
Ulvu Ganizade (AZE)	4

Semifinals
Parviz Nasibov (UKR)	3
Ulvu Ganizade (AZE)	5

=== Repechage ===
Repechage round 2
István Váncza (HUN)	8
Daniel Cataraga (MDA)	0
Giorgi Chkhikvadze (GEO)	0
Mamadassa Sylla (FRA)	4

Bronze medal match
István Váncza (HUN)	1
Narek Oganian (AIN)	3
Mamadassa Sylla (FRA)	0
Parviz Nasibov (UKR)	5

== Final standing ==
Rank	Athlete
1st place, gold medalist(s)	Selçuk Can (TUR)
2nd place, silver medalist(s)	Ulvu Ganizade (AZE)
3rd place, bronze medalist(s)	Narek Oganian (AIN)
3rd place, bronze medalist(s)	Parviz Nasibov (UKR)
5	István Váncza (HUN)
5	Mamadassa Sylla (FRA)
7	Daniel Cataraga (MDA)
8	Dominik Etlinger (CRO)
9	Matias Lipasti (FIN)
10	Aliaksandr Liavonchyk (AIN)
11	Shant Khachatryan (ARM)
12	Michael Widmayer (GER)
13	Håvard Jørgensen (NOR)
14	Michael Portmann (SUI)
15	Giorgi Chkhikvadze (GEO)
16	Mate Nemeš (SRB)
17	Deyvid Dimitrov (BUL)
18	Gevorg Sahakyan (POL)
19	Iulian Lungu (ROU)
