= Narek Oganian =

Russian Greco-Roman wrestler

Narek Oganian Нарек Огонян
Personal information
- Full name: Narek Ashotovich Oganian
- Born: Նարեկ Օհանյան; 16 May 1997 (age 29) Aygehovit, Armenia
- Height: 1.70 m (5 ft 7 in)
- Weight: 72 kg (159 lb; 11.3 st)

Sport
- Country: Russia
- Sport: Amateur wrestling
- Event: Greco-Roman
Medal record
Men's Greco-Roman wrestling
Representing Individual Neutral Athletes
European Championships
Bronze medal – third place	2024 Bucharest	72 kg
Representing Russia
European U23 Championship
Bronze medal – third place	2018 Istanbul	72 kg

Narek Oganian (Нарек Ашотович Оганян; born 16 May 1997) is a Russian Greco-Roman wrestler who currently competes at 72 kilograms of Armenian origin.

== Wrestling career ==
He won one of the bronze medals in the 72 kg event at the 2024 European Wrestling Championships held in Bucharest, Romania.
