= Muhammet Nuri Kotanoğlu =

Turkish freestyle wrestler

Personal information
- Born: August 1, 1993 (age 32) Erzurum, Turkey
- Height: 180 cm (5 ft 11 in)
- Weight: 86 kg (190 lb)

Sport
- Country: Turkey
- Sport: Amateur wrestling
- Event: Freestyle
Medal record
Men's freestyle wrestling
Representing Turkey
European Championships
Bronze medal – third place	2019 Bucharest	79 kg
Individual World Cup
Silver medal – second place	2020 Belgrade	79 kg
World Military Championships
Silver medal – second place	2025 Warendorf	86 kg
Yasar Dogu Tournament
Bronze medal – third place	2019 Istanbul	79 kg
Bronze medal – third place	2020 Istanbul	79 kg
European U23 Championships
Gold medal – first place	2016 Russe	74 kg

Muhammet Nuri Kotanoğlu is a Turkish freestyle wrestler. He is a bronze medalist at the European Wrestling Championships.

== Career ==
He won one of the bronze medals in the 79 kg event at the 2019 European Wrestling Championships held in Bucharest, Romania.

In 2020, he won the silver medal in the men's 79 kg event at the Individual Wrestling World Cup held in Belgrade, Serbia. In 2021, he won the bronze medal in the 79 kg event at the Matteo Pellicone Ranking Series 2021 held in Rome, Italy.

== Major results ==
Year	Tournament	Location	Result	Event
2019	European Championships	Bucharest, Romania	3rd	Freestyle 79 kg
