= Ashraf Ashirov =

Azerbaijani freestyle wrestler

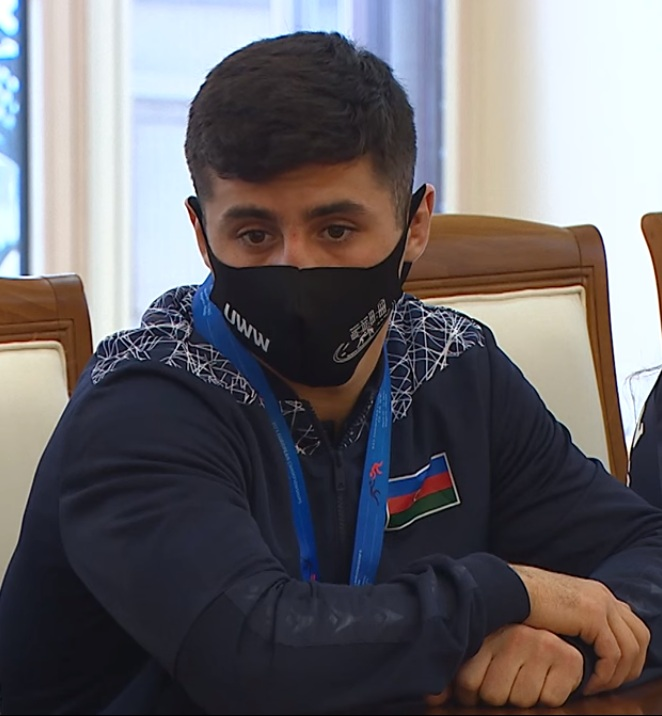

Personal information
- Nationality: Azerbaijan
- Born: 1 January 2001 (age 25) Azerbaijan
- Height: 175 cm (5 ft 9 in)

Sport
- Country: Azerbaijan
- Sport: Amateur wrestling
- Weight class: 79 kg
- Event: Freestyle
Medal record
Men's freestyle wrestling
Representing Azerbaijan
European Championships
Silver medal – second place	2022 Budapest	79 kg
Yasar Dogu Tournament
Bronze medal – third place	2023 Istanbul	79 kg
World U23 Championships
Silver medal – second place	2023 Tirana	79 kg
European U23 Championships
Bronze medal – third place	2022 Plovdiv	79 kg
World Junior Championships
Silver medal – second place	2021 Ufa	79 kg

Ashraf Ashirov (born 1 January 2001) is an Azerbaijani freestyle wrestler competing in the 79 kg division.

== Career ==
In 2021, he won the silver medal in the men's 79 kg event at the 2021 World Junior Wrestling Championships held in Ufa, Russia.

In 2022, he won one of the bronze medals in the men's 79 kg event at the 2022 European U23 Wrestling Championship held in Plovdiv, Bulgaria. He won the silver medal in the 79 kg event at the 2022 European Wrestling Championships held in Budapest, Hungary. He competed in the 79 kg event at the 2022 World Wrestling Championships held in Belgrade, Serbia.

== Achievements ==
Year	Tournament	Location	Result	Event
2022	European Championships	Budapest, Hungary	2.	Freestyle 79 kg
