= Nika Kentchadze =

Georgian freestyle wrestler

Personal information
- Native name: ნიკა კენჭაძე
- Nationality: Georgia
- Born: 17 April 1997 (age 29) Ambrolauri
- Height: 177 cm (5 ft 10 in)

Sport
- Country: Georgia
- Sport: Amateur wrestling
- Weight class: 79 kg
- Event: Freestyle
Medal record
Men's freestyle wrestling
Representing Georgia
World Championships
Bronze medal – third place	2021 Oslo	79 kg
European Championships
Bronze medal – third place	2019 Bucharest	79 kg
Bronze medal – third place	2021 Warsaw	79 kg
World U23 Championships
Gold medal – first place	2018 Bucharest	79 kg
European U23 Championship
Bronze medal – third place	2018 Istanbul	79 kg
European Juniors Championships
Silver medal – second place	2017 Dortmund	74 kg

Nika Kentchadze (born 17 April 1997) is a Georgian freestyle wrestler. He won one of the bronze medals in the men's 79 kg event at the 2021 World Wrestling Championships held in Oslo, Norway. He is also a two-time bronze medalist at the European Wrestling Championships.

== Career ==
In 2018, he won one of the bronze medals in the 79 kg event at the European U23 Wrestling Championship held in Istanbul, Turkey. A few months later, at the 2018 World U23 Wrestling Championship held in Bucharest, Romania, he won the gold medal in the 79 kg event.

He won one of the bronze medals in the 79 kg event at the 2019 European Wrestling Championships held in Bucharest, Romania. He repeated this two years later in the 79 kg event at the 2021 European Wrestling Championships held in Warsaw, Poland.

== Major results ==
Year	Tournament	Location	Result	Event
2019	European Championships	Bucharest, Romania	3rd	Freestyle 79 kg
2021	European Championships	Warsaw, Poland	3rd	Freestyle 79 kg
2021	World Championships	Oslo, Norway	3rd	Freestyle 79 kg
