= Khamzat Arsamerzouev =

French freestyle wrestler

Personal information
- Native name: Хамзат Тимурович Арсамерзуев
- Full name: Khamzat Timourovitch Arsamerzouev
- Nationality: France
- Born: 6 December 2002 (age 23) Chechnya, Russia
- Height: 170 cm (5 ft 7 in)

Sport
- Country: France
- Sport: Amateur wrestling
- Weight class: 65kg
- Event: Freestyle
- Club: Sarreguemines

Achievements and titles
- Regional finals: (silver) (2025)
Medal record
Men's freestyle wrestling
Representing France
European Championships
| Silver medal – second place | 2025 Bratislava | 65 kg |
Dan Kolov & Nikola Petrov Tournament
| Silver medal – second place | 2026 Plovdiv | 65 kg |
Grand Prix
| Silver medal – second place | 2024 Nice | 65 kg |
| Bronze medal – third place | 2021 Nice | 61 kg |
| Bronze medal – third place | 2025 Nice | 65 kg |
| Bronze medal – third place | 2025 Zagreb | 65 kg |
World Military Championships
| Silver medal – second place | 2025 Warendorf | 65 kg |
| Bronze medal – third place | 2024 Yerevan | 70 kg |
European U23 Championships
| Gold medal – first place | 2023 Bucharest | 65 kg |
| Silver medal – second place | 2022 Plovdiv | 61 kg |
| Silver medal – second place | 2024 Baku | 65 kg |
| Bronze medal – third place | 2025 Tirana | 65 kg |
World U20 Championships
| Bronze medal – third place | 2022 Sofia | 61 kg |
European U20 Championships
| Silver medal – second place | 2022 Rome | 61 kg |

Khamzat Arsamerzouev (Russian: Хамзат Тимурович Арсамерзуев; born 6 December 2002) is a Russian-born French wrestler.

== Career ==
Khamzat Arsamerzouev won the French championship in mid-May 2022 in the city of Besançon. In the same year 2022, Khamzat Arsamerzuev first won silver at the European U20 Championship in Bulgaria, then silver at the World U20 Championship in Rome, as well as bronze at the World U20 Championship in Sofia, but did not perform well at the World Youth U23 Championship, where he remained without a medal.

In March 2023 in Bucharest at the European Under-23 Championship he became the winner, in the final of the tournament he was supposed to meet Rashid Babazade from Azerbaijan, however, his opponent did not come to the bout due to injury.

17 February 2024 at the European Championship in Bucharest, in the fight for 3rd place lost to Ali Rahimzade from Azerbaijan, taking the final 5th place.
