= Ferhat Kılıç =

Turkish wrestler (born 2001)

Personal information
- Nationality: Turkish
- Born: 1 January 2001 (age 25) Ovakent, Hatay, Turkey

Sport
- Country: Turkey
- Sport: Wrestling
- Events: Freestyle and karakucak
- Club: Kocaeli Büyükşehir Belediye Kağıtspor

Ferhat Kılıç (born 1 January 2001) is a Turkish freestyle and karakucak wrestler competing at 70 kg. He is a world champion in karakucak, the traditional Turkish wrestling style.

== Career ==
Kılıç was born in the Ovakent neighbourhood of Antakya, Hatay, and wrestles for Kocaeli Büyükşehir Belediye Kağıtspor. He won the gold medal at the karakucak World Championships held in Ankara.

He also competes in freestyle wrestling and took a bronze medal at the 2026 Hasan Gemici & Gazanfer Bilge Tournament.
