= Saifedine Alekma =

French freestyle wrestler

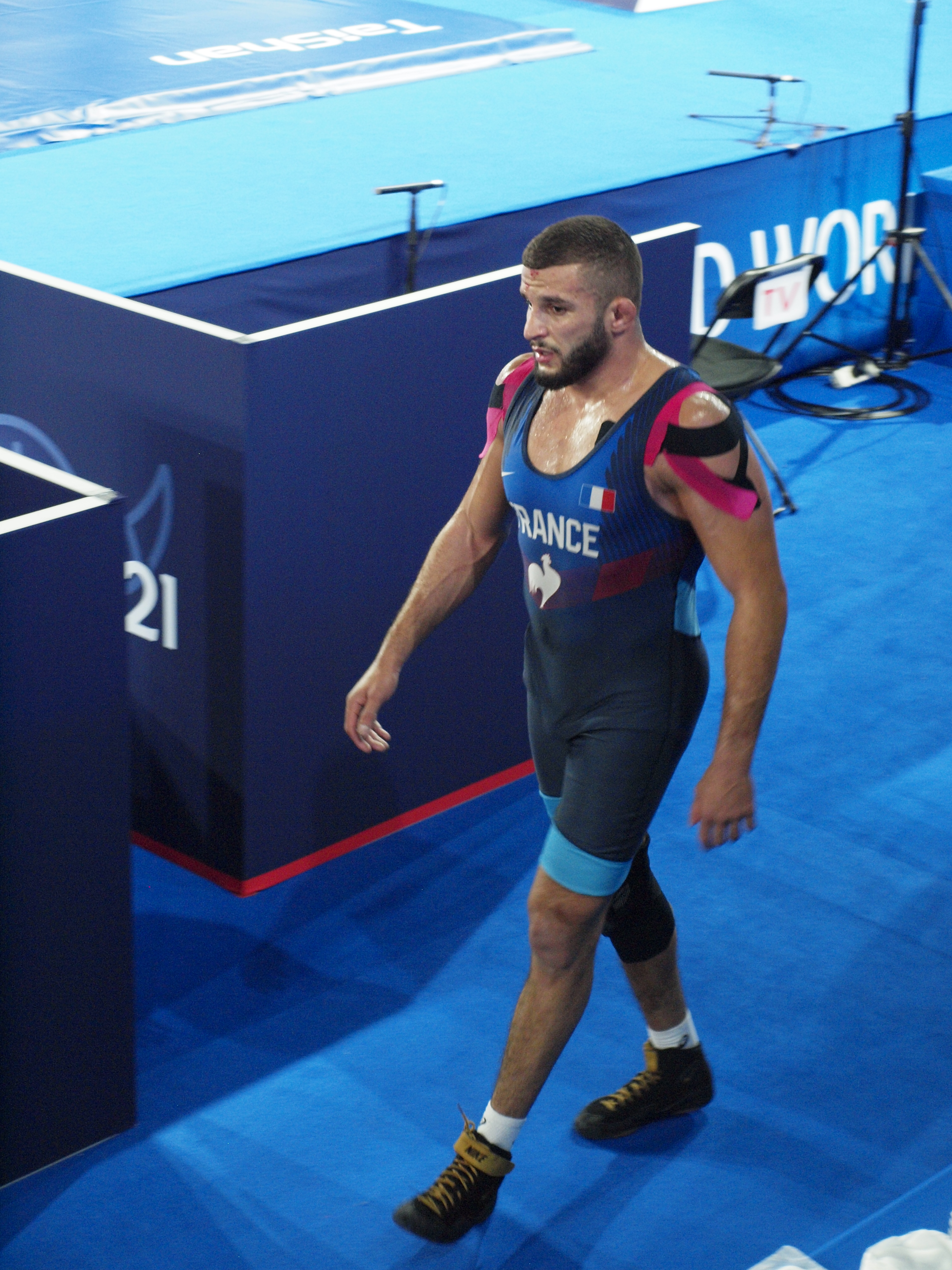
- Saifedine Alekma at the 2021 World Wrestling Championships in Oslo, Norway

Sport
- Country: France
- Sport: Amateur wrestling
- Weight class: 79 kg
- Event: Freestyle
Medal record
Men's freestyle wrestling
Representing France
European Championships
Silver medal – second place	2021 Warsaw	79 kg

Saifedine Alekma is a French freestyle wrestler. He won the silver medal in the 79 kg event at the 2021 European Wrestling Championships held in Warsaw, Poland.

== Career ==
In 2017, he was eliminated in his first match in the 86 kg event at the World Wrestling Championships held in Paris, France. In 2020, he was also eliminated in his first match in the 79 kg event at the European Wrestling Championships held in Rome, Italy.

In May 2021, he failed to qualify for the 2020 Summer Olympics at the World Olympic Qualification Tournament held in Sofia, Bulgaria. He was defeated in his first match by Taimuraz Friev of Spain.

He competed in the 79 kg event at the 2022 World Wrestling Championships held in Belgrade, Serbia.

== Achievements ==
Year	Tournament	Location	Result	Event
2021	European Championships	Warsaw, Poland	2nd	Freestyle 79 kg
