= Iakub Shikhdzamalov =

Russian sport wrestler

Iakubali Shikhdzamalov Якуб Шихджамалов
Personal information
- Full name: Iakubali Shikhdzamalovich Shikhdzamalov
- National team: Romania
- Born: June 6, 1991 (age 35) Makhachkala, Dagestan, Russia
- Weight: 74 kg (163 lb)

Sport
- Country: Russia; Romania (since 2022)
- Sport: Freestyle wrestling
- Event: Amateur wrestling
- Club: Gamid Gamidov wrestling club
- Coached by: Anvar Magomedgadzhiev, Omaraskhab Kuramagomedov
Medal record
Representing Russia
Men's Freestyle wrestling
European Nations Cup
Gold medal – first place	2015 Moscow	74 kg

Iakubali Shikhdzamalovich Shikhdzamalov (Russian: Якуб Шихджамалович Шихджамалов; born 6 June 1991), also known as Yakub Shikhghamalov, is a Russian freestyle wrestler, who represents Romania in international level. He is Russian junior national runner-up. National master of sports in Freestyle Wrestling. Iakubali Shikhdzamalov competed at the World Freestyle Wrestling Cup 2015 in Los Angeles, California, United States. In Russian Freestyle Wrestling Championships 2015 he defeated Jordan Burroughs's rivalry - Denis Tsargush 6–2.

== Championships and accomplishments ==
- 2008 Russian Junior Nationals 3rd – 60 kg
- 2009 Russian Junior Nationals Runner-up – 60 kg
- 2013 Intercontinental Cup 13th – 74 kg
- 2014 Senior Russian Nationals runner-up – 74 kg
- 2014 Hero of the Russian Federation Magomed Omarov Cup Winner – 74 kg
- 2015 Golden Grand Prix Ivan Yarygin 2015 12th – 74 kg
- 2015 World Freestyle Wrestling Cup 2015 – 4th place (Los Angeles, California, USA)
- 2015 Russian National Freestyle Wrestling Championships 2015 5th place – 74 kg (Kaspiysk, Dagestan)
- 2015 European Nations Cup 2015 (Moscow Lights-Alrosa Cup) – 74 kg (Moscow, Russia)
