= Achsarbek Gulajev =

Slovak freestyle wrestler

Akhsarbek Gulaev
Personal information
- Native name: Ахсарбек Казбекович Гулаев
- Nickname: Aša
- Nationality: Russia; Slovakia
- Born: Akhsarbek Kazbekovic Gulaev; 23 August 1997 (age 28) Vladikavkaz, North Ossetia-Alania, Russia
- Height: 174 cm (5 ft 9 in)

Sport
- Country: Russia; Slovakia (since 2017)
- Sport: Amateur wrestling
- Weight class: 79 kg
- Event: Freestyle
- Club: Dukla BB
- Coached by: Kazbek Dedegkaev.

Achievements and titles
- World finals: (bronze) (2024)
- Regional finals: (gold) (2021) (bronze) (2025)
Medal record
Men's freestyle wrestling
Representing Slovakia
World Championships
Bronze medal – third place	2024 Tirana	79 kg
European Championships
Gold medal – first place	2021 Warsaw	79 kg
Bronze medal – third place	2025 Bratislava	79 kg
Yasar Dogu Tournament
Silver medal – second place	2019 Istanbul	79 kg
Grand Prix
Gold medal – first place	2021 Warsaw	79 kg
Bronze medal – third place	2022 Almaty	79 kg
Bronze medal – third place	2024 Budapest	79 kg
U23 World Championships
Silver medal – second place	2017 Bydgoszcz	74 kg
U23 European Championships
Silver medal – second place	2019 Novi Sad	74 kg
Silver medal – second place	2018 Istanbul	74 kg
European Juniors Championships
Bronze medal – third place	2017 Dortmund	74 kg

Akhsarbek Kazbekovic Gulaev (Iron Ossetic: Гулаты Хъазыбеджы фырт Æхсарбег, Russian: Ахсарбек Казбекович Гулаев, born 23 August 1997) is a Russian-born Slovak freestyle wrestler of Ossetian heritage who competes at 79 kilograms. Representing Slovakia since 2017, Gulajev is the reigning European Continental champion and was a silver medalist at the 2017 U23 World Championships and the U23 European Continental Championships in 2018 and 2019. He competed in the 79 kg event at the 2022 World Wrestling Championships held in Belgrade, Serbia.

== Major results ==
Year	Competition	Venue	Position	Event	Notes
Representing Slovakia
2017	U23 World Championships	Bydgoszcz, Poland	2nd	Freestyle 74 kg	
2018	U23 European Championships	Istanbul, Turkey	2nd	Freestyle 74 kg	
2019	U23 European Championships	Novi Sad, Serbia	2nd	Freestyle 74 kg	
2021	European Championships	Warsaw, Poland	1st	Freestyle 79 kg	
