= 2023 World Wrestling Championships – Men's freestyle 79 kg =

Wrestling competitions

Men's freestyle 79 kg at the 2023 World Championships
- Venue: Štark Arena
- Dates: 17–18 September 2023
- Competitors: 27 from 23 nations

Medalists
gold medal	Akhmed Usmanov
silver medal	Vladimeri Gamkrelidze	Georgia
bronze medal	Mohammad Nokhodi	Iran
bronze medal	Vasyl Mykhailov	Ukraine

The men's freestyle 79 kilograms competition at the 2023 World Wrestling Championships was held in Belgrade, Serbia on 17 and 18 September 2023.

This freestyle wrestling competition consists of a single-elimination tournament, with a repechage used to determine the winner of two bronze medals. The two finalists face off for gold and silver medals. Each wrestler who loses to one of the two finalists moves into the repechage, culminating in a pair of bronze medal matches featuring the semifinal losers each facing the remaining repechage opponent from their half of the bracket.

== Results ==
Legend

- F — Won by fall

=== Final ===
Final
Akhmed Usmanov (AIN)	4
Vladimeri Gamkrelidze (GEO)	1

=== Top half ===
Round of 32
Ramazan Sarı (TUR)	11
Yuto Miwa (JPN)	0
Raúl Palacios (MEX)	3
Sachin Mor (UWW)	8
Akhmed Usmanov (AIN)	3
Ahmad Magomedov (MKD)	2
Chemseddine Fetairia (ALG)	6
Lee Gun-woo (KOR)	6
Orkhan Abbasov (AZE)	6
Iman Mahdavi (UWW)	3

Round of 16
Mohammad Nokhodi (IRI)	9
Ramazan Sarı (TUR)	4
Sachin Mor (UWW)	0
Akhmed Usmanov (AIN)	11
Chance Marsteller (USA)	7
Chemseddine Fetairia (ALG)	2
Orkhan Abbasov (AZE)	7^{F}
Arman Avagyan (ARM)	1

Quarterfinals
Mohammad Nokhodi (IRI)	2
Akhmed Usmanov (AIN)	5
Chance Marsteller (USA)	3
Orkhan Abbasov (AZE)	9

Semifinals
Akhmed Usmanov (AIN)	3
Orkhan Abbasov (AZE)	0

=== Bottom half ===
Round of 32
Alans Amirovs (LAT)	10
Francisco Kadima (ANG)	0
Mihail Georgiev (BUL)	4^{F}
Shuhrat Bozorov (TJK)	6
Jasmit Phulka (CAN)	1
Bolat Sakayev (KAZ)	12
Achsarbek Gulajev (SVK)	2
Gurbanmyrat Öwezberdiýew (TKM)	2
Zaur Efendiev (SRB)	3
Andrei Karpach (AIN)	6
Li Peilong (CHN)	8
Bat-Erdeniin Byambadorj (MGL)	12^{F}

Round of 16
Vladimeri Gamkrelidze (GEO)	8
Alans Amirovs (LAT)	0
Mihail Georgiev (BUL)	0
Bolat Sakayev (KAZ)	7
Achsarbek Gulajev (SVK)	1
Andrei Karpach (AIN)	1
Bat-Erdeniin Byambadorj (MGL)	0
Vasyl Mykhailov (UKR)	10

Quarterfinals
Vladimeri Gamkrelidze (GEO)	8
Bolat Sakayev (KAZ)	2
Achsarbek Gulajev (SVK)	2
Vasyl Mykhailov (UKR)	5

Semifinals
Vladimeri Gamkrelidze (GEO)	10
Vasyl Mykhailov (UKR)	4

=== Repechage ===
Repechage round 1
Ahmad Magomedov (MKD)	16
Sachin Mor (UWW)	6

Repechage round 2
Ahmad Magomedov (MKD)	1
Mohammad Nokhodi (IRI)	5
Alans Amirovs (LAT)	1
Bolat Sakayev (KAZ)	4

Bronze medals
Mohammad Nokhodi (IRI)	10
Orkhan Abbasov (AZE)	0
Bolat Sakayev (KAZ)	1
Vasyl Mykhailov (UKR)	3

== Final standing ==
Rank	Athlete
1st place, gold medalist(s)	Akhmed Usmanov (AIN)
2nd place, silver medalist(s)	Vladimeri Gamkrelidze (GEO)
3rd place, bronze medalist(s)	Mohammad Nokhodi (IRI)
3rd place, bronze medalist(s)	Vasyl Mykhailov (UKR)
5	Orkhan Abbasov (AZE)
5	Bolat Sakayev (KAZ)
7	Achsarbek Gulajev (SVK)
8	Ahmad Magomedov (MKD)
9	Bat-Erdeniin Byambadorj (MGL)
10	Mihail Georgiev (BUL)
11	Ramazan Sarı (TUR)
12	Alans Amirovs (LAT)
13	Sachin Mor (UWW)
14	Chance Marsteller (USA)
15	Chemseddine Fetairia (ALG)
16	Andrei Karpach (AIN)
17	Lee Gun-woo (KOR)
18	Iman Mahdavi (UWW)
19	Zaur Efendiev (SRB)
20	Raúl Palacios (MEX)
21	Gurbanmyrat Öwezberdiýew (TKM)
22	Jasmit Phulka (CAN)
23	Li Peilong (CHN)
24	Shuhrat Bozorov (TJK)
25	Arman Avagyan (ARM)
26	Francisco Kadima (ANG)
27	Yuto Miwa (JPN)
