= Vladimeri Gamkrelidze =

Georgian freestyle wrestler

Vladimer Gamkrelidze
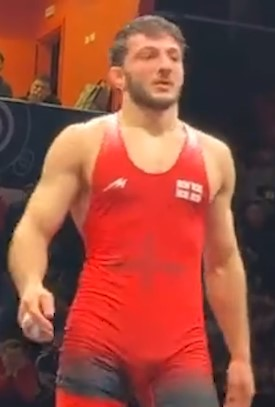

Personal information
- Native name: ვლადიმერ გამყრელიძე
- Born: 11 June 2001 (age 25) Ambrolauri, Georgia
- Height: 1.80 m (5 ft 11 in)

Sport
- Country: Georgia
- Sport: Amateur wrestling
- Weight class: 79 kg
- Event: Freestyle

Achievements and titles
- World finals: (silver) (2023)
- Regional finals: (bronze) (2022) (bronze) (2025)
Medal record
Men's freestyle wrestling
Representing Georgia
World Championships
Silver medal – second place	2023 Belgrade	79 kg
European Championships
Bronze medal – third place	2022 Budapest	79 kg
Bronze medal – third place	2025 Bratislava	79 kg
Bronze medal – third place	2026 Tirana	86 kg
Dan Kolov & Nikola Petrov Tournament
Bronze medal – third place	2021 Plovdiv	74 kg
Grand Prix
Gold medal – first place	2023 Bishkek	79 kg
Gold medal – first place	2025 Budapest	79 kg
Silver medal – second place	2026 Zagreb	86 kg
Bronze medal – third place	2022 Rome	79 kg
Bronze medal – third place	2023 Zagreb	79 kg
Bronze medal – third place	2025 Zagreb	79 kg
World U23 Championships
Gold medal – first place	2022 Pontevedra	79 kg
Bronze medal – third place	2023 Tirana	79 kg
European U23 Championships
Silver medal – second place	2023 Bucharest	79 kg
Bronze medal – third place	2021 Skopje	74 kg
European Cadets Championships
Silver medal – second place	2017 Sarajevo	54 kg
Bronze medal – third place	2018 Skopje	60 kg

Vladimer Gamkrelidze (born 11 June 2001) is a Georgian freestyle wrestler. He won the silver medal in the men's 79 kg event at the 2023 World Wrestling Championships held in Belgrade, Serbia.

== Career ==
Gamkrelidze won the bronze medal at the 2022 European Wrestling Championships in Budapest, Hungary, by defeating Armenian Arman Avagyan 9–7 in the third place match in the 79 kg freestyle category.

On 18 September 2023, Gamkrelidze won a silver medal in the 79 kg weight category at the 2023 World Wrestling Championships in Belgrade. In the final, in a very hard-fought match, he lost 1:4 to Russian wrestler Akhmed Usmanov.

Gamkrelidze competed at the 2024 European Wrestling Olympic Qualification Tournament in Baku, Azerbaijan hoping to qualify for the 2024 Summer Olympics in Paris, France. He was eliminated in his third match and he did not qualify for the Olympics. A month later, Gamkrelidze earned a quota place for Georgia for the Olympics at the 2024 World Wrestling Olympic Qualification Tournament held in Istanbul, Turkey. He lost his semifinal match to Magomed Ramazanov, but wrestled back and beat Vasyl Mykhailov to qualify for the Olympics. He competed in the men's freestyle 86 kg event at the Olympics.
