= Carter Starocci =

American wrestler (born 2001)

Personal information
- Full name: Carter Alphonse Starocci
- Born: February 8, 2001 (age 25) Erie, Pennsylvania, U.S.
- Height: 5 ft 11 in (1.80 m)

Sport
- Country: United States
- Sport: Wrestling
- Weight class: 174 lb (79 kg)
- Events: Freestyle and Folkstyle
- College team: Penn State
- Club: Nittany Lion Wrestling Club
- Coached by: Cael Sanderson
Medal record
Men's freestyle wrestling
Representing the United States
U23 World Championships
Bronze medal – third place	2022 Pontevedra	79 kg
Men's collegiate wrestling
Representing the Penn State Nittany Lions
NCAA Division I Championships
Gold medal – first place	2021 St. Louis	174 lb
Gold medal – first place	2022 Detroit	174 lb
Gold medal – first place	2023 Tulsa	174 lb
Gold medal – first place	2024 Kansas City	174 lb
Gold medal – first place	2025 Philadelphia	184 lb
Big Ten Championships
Gold medal – first place	2022 Lincoln	174 lb
Gold medal – first place	2023 College Park	174 lb
Gold medal – first place	2025 Evanston	184 lb
Silver medal – second place	2021 State College	174 lb

Carter Alphonse Starocci (born February 8, 2001) is an American freestyle and former folkstyle wrestler who competes at 184 pounds. In freestyle, he was a U23 World bronze medalist in 2022.

In folkstyle, Starocci is the only five-time NCAA Division I National champion in history, and was a three-time Big Ten Conference champion out of the Pennsylvania State University.

== Career ==
=== High school ===
Starocci was born and raised in Erie, Pennsylvania, where he started wrestling at the age of three. Raised Catholic, he attended Cathedral Preparatory School. During his high school years, Starocci became a two-time PIAA Class AAA state champion and four-time state placer. In freestyle, he placed at multiple national tournaments and was a Fargo National champion as well as in Greco-Roman. One of the top-recruits in the country, Starocci committed to wrestle for the Penn State Nittany Lions, and closed out his high school career at 172–10.

=== Pennsylvania State University ===
==== 2019–2020 ====
Starocci wore a redshirt during his first year in college, racking up an unbeaten 19–0 record and titles from the Southern Scuffle, the Edinboro Open, the Patriot Open and the Clarion Open while wrestling unattached.

==== 2020–2021 ====
Competing as a freshman, Starocci recorded a 6–1 mark in dual meets during regular season, with a lone loss to DJ Washington though a notable victory over All-American Logan Massa. At the Big Ten Conference Championships, Starocci placed second, falling to Michael Kemerer from Iowa after defeating Nebraska's All-American Mikey Labriola to cruise to the finals. Starocci, the third-seed, then became the NCAA Division I National champion with a series of back-to-back wins, and a rematch-victory over Kemerer in the finals to top it off.

After the season, Starocci went up 13 pounds and competed at the US Olympic Team Trials at 86 kilograms, having qualified by becoming an NCAA champion a month before. He was eliminated after losing back-to-back matches to U23 World champion Bo Nickal and NCAA champion Myles Martin.

==== 2021–2022 ====
In September 2021, Starocci competed at the US World Team Trials at 79 kilograms, where after falling in the first round to US National champion Taylor Lujan, he racked up wins over the likes of teammate and three-time NCAA champion Jason Nolf and All-Americans Chance Marsteller and Evan Wick.

Back to folkstyle, Starocci went 15–0 in dual meets as a sophomore, grabbed his first Big Ten Conference title and became a back-to-back NCAA Division I National champion with victories over fellow NCAA champion Mekhi Lewis, three-time All-American Hayden Hidlay and two-time All-American Michael Kemerer, closing out the year at 25–0.

He then competed at the US World Team Trials Challenge Tournament in May, where after falling to US National runner-up Chance Marsteller in a rematch, Starocci defeated three straight opponents, including Dan Hodge Trophy winner Alex Dieringer and three-time All-American David McFadden, to place third. A true-third match against fellow two-time NCAA champion Vincenzo Joseph was set to take place in June at Final X NYC, however, Joseph forfeited the match and Starocci earned a US National Team spot, which qualified him for the U23 World Championships.

In October, Starocci became a U23 World bronze medalist, with wins over U20 World medalist Abdulvasi Balta and U23 European medalist Valentyn Babii though a close loss to Daulet Yergesh in the semi-finals.

==== 2022–2023 ====
Back to folkstyle, Starocci went 16–0 in dual meets during regular season, claimed the Big Ten title and became a three-time 2023 NCAA Division I National champion. He closed up the year at 24–0, with five victories over All-Americans.

In April, Starocci reached the semi-finals of the US Open National Championships with a dominant win over four-time All-American Michael Kemerer, though was defeated by three-time NCAA champion Alex Dieringer in a rematch, and subsequently dropped out of the tournament to place sixth.

==== 2023–2024 ====
A senior, Starocci came in the season looking to become the sixth four-time NCAA champion in history, and looked fit to do so after picking up nine dual meet victories and a Journeymen Classic title. However, he suffered a knee injury right at the end of his last dual meet, and was forced to medical forfeit out of the Big Ten Championships, though earned an at-large bid to the NCAA tournament due to past accomplishments. After two forfeits which counted as losses, Starocci, the ninth-seed, earned four straight victories, including two over past NCAA champions Mekhi Lewis and Shane Griffith, before cruising to the finals and defeating Rocco Welsh to become a four-time NCAA champion.

Starocci then competed at the US Olympic Team Trials in April, where he was expected to cut down to 74 kilograms, though ended up going up to 86 kilograms. After a win over US National champion Pat Downey, he was defeated by U23 World finalist Trent Hidlay, and later forfeited out of the tournament to end his run.

==== 2024–2025 ====
Starocci was given an extra year of eligibility as an athlete who competed during the COVID-affected 2020-21 season. He won the Big Ten Tournament in March and was named the Big Ten Wrestler of the Year. He would go onto win the NCAA Division I Wrestling Championships later in March, becoming the first ever five-time NCAA Division I National champion.

== Freestyle record ==
Senior Freestyle Matches
Res.	Record	Opponent	Score	Date	Event	Location
Loss	17-9	(United States) Nate Jackson	2-7	October 25, 2025	RAF 02	(United States) State College, Pennsylvania
2025 US World Team Trials (bronze) at 86 kg
Win	17–8	(United States) Parker Keckeisen	4–3	June 14, 2025	2025 Final X	(United States) Newark, New Jersey
Loss	16–8	(United States) Kyle Dake	3–3	May 16–17, 2025	2025 US World Team Trials Challenge	(United States) Louisville, Kentucky
Win	16–7	(United States) Chance Marsteller	4–2	May 16–17, 2025	2025 US World Team Trials Challenge	(United States) Louisville, Kentucky
2024 US Olympic Team Trials DNP at 86 kg
Loss		(United States) Evan Wick	FF	April 19, 2024	2024 US Olympic Team Trials	(United States) State College, Pennsylvania
Loss	15–7	(United States) Trent Hidlay	4–6	April 19, 2024	2024 US Olympic Team Trials	(United States) State College, Pennsylvania
Win	15–6	(United States) Pat Downey	12-4	April 19, 2024	2024 US Olympic Team Trials	(United States) State College, Pennsylvania
2023 US Open 6th at 79 kg
Loss		(United States) Alex Marinelli	FF	April 27, 2023	2023 US Open National Championships	(United States) Las Vegas, Nevada
Loss	14–6	(United States) Alex Dieringer	1–7	April 27, 2023	2023 US Open National Championships	(United States) Las Vegas, Nevada
Win	14–5	(United States) Michael Kemerer	9–0	April 27, 2023	2023 US Open National Championships	(United States) Las Vegas, Nevada
Win	13–5	(United States) Jay Nivison	TF 10–0	April 27, 2023	2023 US Open National Championships	(United States) Las Vegas, Nevada
Win	12–5	(United States) Sean Houston	TF 10–0	April 27, 2023	2023 US Open National Championships	(United States) Las Vegas, Nevada
2022 U23 World Championships (bronze) at 79 kg
Win	11–5	(Ukraine) Valentyn Babii	TF 11–0	October 21–22, 2022	2022 U23 World Championships	Pontevedra, Spain
Loss	10–5	(Kazakhstan) Daulet Yergesh	7–8	October 21–22, 2022	2022 U23 World Championships	Pontevedra, Spain
Win	10–4	(Turkey) Abdulvasi Balta	TF 11–0	October 21–22, 2022	2022 U23 World Championships	Pontevedra, Spain
Win	9–4	(Estonia) Erik Reinbok	TF 10–0	October 21–22, 2022	2022 U23 World Championships	Pontevedra, Spain
Win	8–4	(Bulgaria) Oktay Hasan	TF 11–0	October 21–22, 2022	2022 U23 World Championships	Pontevedra, Spain
2022 US World Team Trials (bronze) at 79 kg
Win		(United States) Vincenzo Joseph	FF	June 8, 2022	2022 Final X NYC	(United States) New York City
Win	7–4	(United States) David McFadden	10–2	May 21–22, 2022	2022 US World Team Trials	(United States) Lincoln, Nebraska
Win	6–4	(United States) Alex Dieringer	5–1	May 21–22, 2022	2022 US World Team Trials	(United States) Lincoln, Nebraska
Win	5–4	(United States) Brayden Thompson	10–1	May 21–22, 2022	2022 US World Team Trials	(United States) Lincoln, Nebraska
Loss	4–4	(United States) Chance Marsteller	4–5	May 21–22, 2022	2022 US World Team Trials	(United States) Lincoln, Nebraska
2021 US World Team Trials (bronze) at 79 kg
Win	4–3	(United States) Jason Nolf	4–3	September 11–12, 2021	2021 US World Team Trials	(United States) Lincoln, Nebraska
Win		(United States) Isaiah Martinez	FF	September 11–12, 2021	2021 US World Team Trials	(United States) Lincoln, Nebraska
Win	3–3	(United States) Evan Wick	8–4	September 11–12, 2021	2021 US World Team Trials	(United States) Lincoln, Nebraska
Win	2–3	(United States) Chance Marsteller	4–0	September 11–12, 2021	2021 US World Team Trials	(United States) Lincoln, Nebraska
Win	1–3	(United States) Branson Ashworth	7–3	September 11–12, 2021	2021 US World Team Trials	(United States) Lincoln, Nebraska
Loss	0–3	(United States) Taylor Lujan	4–6	September 11–12, 2021	2021 US World Team Trials	(United States) Lincoln, Nebraska
2020 US Olympic Team Trials DNP at 86 kg
Loss	0–2	(United States) Myles Martin	2–5	April 2, 2021	2020 US Olympic Team Trials	(United States) Fort Worth, Texas
Loss	0–1	(United States) Bo Nickal	1–6	April 2, 2021	2020 US Olympic Team Trials	(United States) Fort Worth, Texas
