= Magomed Magomaev =

Russian freestyle wrestler (born 2000)

Personal information
- Full name: Magomed Magomedovich Magomaev
- National team: Russia
- Born: 11 April 2000 (age 26) Dagestan, Russia
- Weight: 79 kg (174 lb)

Sport
- Country: Russia
- Sport: Wrestling
- Weight class: 79kg
- Rank: International master of sports in freestyle wrestling
- Event: Freestyle
- Club: Lokomotiv WC (Bryansk); Olympic training center (Khasavyurt, Dagestan)
- Coached by: Ali Iskhakov, Nikolai Kozlov, Dmitriy Kozlov, Aleskey Bazulin

Achievements and titles
- National finals: (gold) (2024)
Medal record
Men's freestyle wrestling
Representing Individual Neutral Athletes
World Championships
| Gold medal – first place | 2024 Tirana | 79 kg |
U23 World Championships
| Gold medal – first place | 2023 Tirana | 79 kg |
Representing Russia
| Gold medal – first place | 2021 Belgrade | 79 kg |
Ivan Yarygin cup
| Silver medal – second place | 2024 Krasnoyarsk | 79 kg |
BRICS Games
| Gold medal – first place | 2024 Kazan | 79 kg |
Representing Dagestan
Russian Championships
| Gold medal – first place | 2024 Novoivanovskoye | 79 kg |
Representing Bryansk Oblast
| Silver medal – second place | 2022 Kyzyl | 79 kg |
All-Russian Spartakiad
| Gold medal – first place | 2022 Kazan | 79 kg |

Magomed Magomedivoch Magomaev (Russian: Магомед Магомедович Магомаев; born 11 April 2000) is a Russian freestyle wrestler who competes in the 79 kilogram class. He is the 2024 world finalist and the 2024 Russian national champion. He has been twice U23 world champion.

== Career ==
He has the 2020 junior national title at 79 kilos. In September 2021, he came third at the senior Alexander Medved international tournament in Minsk, Belarus In October 2021, he won the U23 Russian national championships in Naro-Fominsk and made U23 world team. In November 2024, he won hist first U23 world gold medal in Belgrad, Serbia, where he beat Ramazan Sarı of Turkey in the final match. In 2022, he was the finalist of the senior Russian national championships in Kyzyl and U23 Russian championships in Khanty-Mansiysk. In September 2023, he won the U23 Russian nationals again at 79 kilos. In the final bout he over Ibragim Kadiev of Dagestan In October 2023, he won U23 worlds again at 79 kg. In January 2024, Magomaev took the silver medal from Ivan Yarygin cup in Krasnoyarsk. In May 2024, Magomed became senior Russian national champion at 79 kg. In June 2024, he competed at the BRICS Games as a Russian athlete and won the gold medal. In October 2024, he was a senior world championships runner-up held in Tirana, Albania.

== Championships and achievements ==
- Senior level:
  - 2022 Russian championships — 2nd.
  - 2022 All-Russian Spartakiad — 1st.
  - 2024 Ivan Yarygin cup — 2nd.
  - 2024 Russian championships — 1st.
  - 2024 BRICS Games — 1st.
  - 2024 World championships — 2nd.
- Junior and U23 level:
  - 2020 U20 Russian championships — 1st.
  - 2021, 2023 U23 Russian championships — 1st.
  - 2022 U23 Russian championships — 2nd.
  - 2021, 2023 U23 World championships — 1st.
