= 2023 European Wrestling Championships – Men's freestyle 79 kg =

Wrestling competition

Men's freestyle 79 kg at the 2023 European Wrestling Championships
- Venue: Arena Zagreb
- Location: Zagreb, Croatia
- Dates: 17-18 April
- Competitors: 17

Medalists
| gold medal | Vasyl Mykhailov | Ukraine |
| silver medal | Georgios Kougioumtsidis | Greece |
| bronze medal | Khetag Tsabolov | Serbia |
| bronze medal | Ahmad Magomedov | North Macedonia |

The Men's Freestyle 79 kg is a competition featured at the 2023 European Wrestling Championships, and was held in Zagreb, Croatia on April 17 and 18.

== Results ==
Legend

- F — Won by fall
- WO — Won by walkover

Round of 32
| | Score | |
|---|---|---|
| Krešo Škugor (CRO) | 0–10 | Khetag Tsabolov (SRB) |

Round of 16
Vasyl Mykhailov (UKR) | 15
Achsarbek Gulajev (SVK) | 4
Khetag Tsabolov (SRB) | 21
Csaba Vida (HUN) | 12
Sabuhi Amiraslanov (AZE) | 3
Iman Mahdavi (UWW) | 0
Muhammet Akdeniz (TUR) | 0
Vladimeri Gamkrelidze (GEO) | 8
Georgios Kougioumtsidis (GRE) | 10
Gabriel Iglesias (ESP) | 0
Stanislav Novac (MDA) | 0
Ahmad Magomedov (MKD) | 8
Saifedine Alekma (FRA) | 0
Maxim Vasilioglo (ROU) | 7
Mihail Georgiev (BUL) | 1
Arman Avagyan (ARM) | 5

Quarterfinals
Vasyl Mykhailov (UKR) | 8
Khetag Tsabolov (SRB) | 1
Sabuhi Amiraslanov (AZE) | 10
Vladimeri Gamkrelidze (GEO) | 0
Georgios Kougioumtsidis (GRE) | 5
Ahmad Magomedov (MKD) | 3
Maxim Vasilioglo (ROU) | 1
Arman Avagyan (ARM) | 5

Semifinals
Vasyl Mykhailov (UKR) | 5
Sabuhi Amiraslanov (AZE) | 2
Georgios Kougioumtsidis (GRE) | 12
Arman Avagyan (ARM) | 10

Final
Vasyl Mykhailov (UKR) | 3
Georgios Kougioumtsidis (GRE) | 1

Repechage round 1
Achsarbek Gulajev (SVK) | 2
Khetag Tsabolov (SRB) | 6
Gabriel Iglesias (ESP) | 0
Ahmad Magomedov (MKD) | 10

Bronze medal match
Khetag Tsabolov (SRB) | WO
Sabuhi Amiraslanov (AZE)
Ahmad Magomedov (MKD) | 7
Arman Avagyan (ARM) | 4

== Final standing ==
| Rank | Athlete |
|---|---|
| 1st place, gold medalist(s) | Vasyl Mykhailov (UKR) |
| 2nd place, silver medalist(s) | Georgios Kougioumtsidis (GRE) |
| 3rd place, bronze medalist(s) | Khetag Tsabolov (SRB) |
| 3rd place, bronze medalist(s) | Ahmad Magomedov (MKD) |
| 5 | Arman Avagyan (ARM) |
| 5 | Sabuhi Amiraslanov (AZE) |
| 7 | Maxim Vasilioglo (ROU) |
| 8 | Vladimeri Gamkrelidze (GEO) |
| 9 | Csaba Vida (HUN) |
| 10 | Achsarbek Gulajev (SVK) |
| 11 | Mihail Georgiev (BUL) |
| 12 | Iman Mahdavi (UWW) |
| 13 | Saifedine Alekma (FRA) |
| 14 | Muhammet Akdeniz (TUR) |
| 15 | Stanislav Novac (MDA) |
| 16 | Krešo Škugor (CRO) |
| 17 | Gabriel Iglesias (ESP) |
