= 2025 European Wrestling Championships – Men's freestyle 79 kg =

Wrestling competition

Men's freestyle 79 kg at the 2025 European Wrestling Championships
- Venue: X-Bionic Sphere
- Location: Bratislava, Slovakia
- Dates: 7-8 April
- Competitors: 15

Medalists
gold medal	Akhmed Usmanov
silver medal	Zelimkhan Khadjiev	France
bronze medal	Achsarbek Gulajev	Slovakia
bronze medal	Vladimeri Gamkrelidze	Georgia

The men's freestyle 79 kg is a competition featured at the 2025 European Wrestling Championships, and was held in Bratislava, Slovakia on April 7 and 8.

== Results ==
Legend

- F — Won by fall
- R — Retired

Round of 16
Orkhan Abasov (AZE)	5
Zelimkhan Khadjiev (FRA)	9
Ion Laurențiu Marcu (MDA)	10
Mateusz Pędzicki (POL)	3
Simon Marchl (AUT)	6
Ahmad Magomedov (MKD)	0^{R}
Lucas Kahnt (GER)	6
Okan Tahtacı (TUR)	8
Jacopo Masotti (ITA)	0
Mohammad Mottaghinia (ESP)	10
Hayk Papikyan (ARM)	0
Vasyl Mykhailov (UKR)	10
Akhmed Usmanov (UWW)	3
Vladimeri Gamkrelidze (GEO)	1

Quarterfinals
Achsarbek Gulajev (SVK)	0
Zelimkhan Khadjiev (FRA)	4
Ion Laurențiu Marcu (MDA)	4
Simon Marchl (AUT)	1
Okan Tahtacı (TUR)	4
Mohammad Mottaghinia (ESP)	14
Vasyl Mykhailov (UKR)	1
Akhmed Usmanov (UWW)	2

Semifinals
Zelimkhan Khadjiev (FRA)	7
Ion Laurențiu Marcu (MDA)	0
Mohammad Mottaghinia (ESP)	0
Akhmed Usmanov (UWW)	7

Final
Zelimkhan Khadjiev (FRA)	1
Akhmed Usmanov (UWW)	9

Repechage round 1
Orkhan Abasov (AZE)	3
Achsarbek Gulajev (SVK)	4
Vladimeri Gamkrelidze (GEO)	5
Vasyl Mykhailov (UKR)	3

Bronze medal match
Achsarbek Gulajev (SVK)	3
Ion Laurențiu Marcu (MDA)	0
Vladimeri Gamkrelidze (GEO)	4
Mohammad Mottaghinia (ESP)	1

== Final standing ==
Rank	Athlete
1st place, gold medalist(s)	Akhmed Usmanov (UWW)
2nd place, silver medalist(s)	Zelimkhan Khadjiev (FRA)
3rd place, bronze medalist(s)	Achsarbek Gulajev (SVK)
3rd place, bronze medalist(s)	Vladimeri Gamkrelidze (GEO)
5	Ion Laurențiu Marcu (MDA)
5	Mohammad Mottaghinia (ESP)
7	Vasyl Mykhailov (UKR)
8	Simon Marchl (AUT)
9	Okan Tahtacı (TUR)
10	Orkhan Abasov (AZE)
11	Lucas Kahnt (GER)
12	Mateusz Pędzicki (POL)
13	Ahmad Magomedov (MKD)
14	Jacopo Masotti (ITA)
15	Hayk Papikyan (ARM)
