= 2022 U23 World Wrestling Championships – Men's freestyle 79 kg =

Wrestling competitions

Men's freestyle 79 kg at the 2022 U23 World Championships
- Venue: Pontevedra Municipal Sports Hall
- Dates: 21–22 October
- Competitors: 22 from 22 nations

Medalists
| gold medal | Vladimeri Gamkrelidze | Georgia |
| silver medal | Daulet Yergesh | Kazakhstan |
| bronze medal | Arman Avagyan | Armenia |
| bronze medal | Carter Starocci | United States |

The men's freestyle 79 kg is a competition featured at the 2022 U23 World Wrestling Championships, and was held in Pontevedra, Spain on 21 and 22 October 2022. The qualification rounds were held on 20 October while medal matches were held on the 2nd day of the competition. A total of 22 wrestlers competed in this event, limited to athletes whose body weight was less than 79 kilograms.

This freestyle wrestling competition consists of a single-elimination tournament, with a repechage used to determine the winner of two bronze medals. The two finalists face off for gold and silver medals. Each wrestler who loses to one of the two finalists moves into the repechage, culminating in a pair of bronze medal matches featuring the semifinal losers each facing the remaining repechage opponent from their half of the bracket.

== Results ==
Legend

- F — Won by fall
- WO — Won by walkover

=== Final ===
| Final |
| Vladimeri Gamkrelidze (GEO) | 5 |
| Daulet Yergesh (KAZ) | 3 |

=== Top half ===
Round of 32
Vladimeri Gamkrelidze (GEO) | 14
Tanguy Darbellay (SUI) | 7
Adam Thomson (CAN) | 14
Miguel Ornelas (MEX) | 3
Georgios Kougioumtsidis (GRE) | 10
Zsombor Nagy (HUN) | 0

Round of 16
Ilan Bondar (ISR) | WO
~~Mohammad Nokhodi (IRI)~~
Vladimeri Gamkrelidze (GEO) | 7
Arman Avagyan (ARM) | 5
Gabriel Iglesias (ESP) | 2
Adam Thomson (CAN) | 5
Georgios Kougioumtsidis (GRE) | 4^{F}
Rasindu Pedige (SRI) | 0

Quarterfinals
Ilan Bondar (ISR) | 0
Vladimeri Gamkrelidze (GEO) | 4^{F}
Adam Thomson (CAN) | 0
Georgios Kougioumtsidis (GRE) | 12

Semifinals
Vladimeri Gamkrelidze (GEO) | 9
Georgios Kougioumtsidis (GRE) | 6

=== Bottom half ===
Round of 32
Oktay Hasan (BUL) | 0
Carter Starocci (USA) | 11
Ernest Dorosz (POL) | 0
Abdulvasi Balta (TUR) | 10
Ashraf Ashirov (AZE) | 10
Kousuke Yamakura (JPN) | 11

Round of 16
Erik Reinbok (EST) | 0
Carter Starocci (USA) | 10
Abdulvasi Balta (TUR) | 4
Stanislav Novac (MDA) | 0
Valentyn Babii (UKR) | 5
Kousuke Yamakura (JPN) | 4
Daulet Yergesh (KAZ) | 10
Tony Negron (PUR) | 0

Quarterfinals
Carter Starocci (USA) | 11
Abdulvasi Balta (TUR) | 1
Valentyn Babii (UKR) | 1
Daulet Yergesh (KAZ) | 8

Semifinals
Carter Starocci (USA) | 7
Daulet Yergesh (KAZ) | 8

=== Repechage ===
Repechage round 1
Tanguy Darbellay (SUI) | 0
Arman Avagyan (ARM) | 7

Repechage round 2
Arman Avagyan (ARM) | 10
Ilan Bondar (ISR) | 0
Tony Negron (PUR) | 4
Valentyn Babii (UKR) | 7

Bronze medals
Arman Avagyan (ARM) | 6
Georgios Kougioumtsidis (GRE) | 4
Valentyn Babii (UKR) | 0
Carter Starocci (USA) | 11

== Final standing ==
| Rank | Athlete |
|---|---|
| 1st place, gold medalist(s) | Vladimeri Gamkrelidze (GEO) |
| 2nd place, silver medalist(s) | Daulet Yergesh (KAZ) |
| 3rd place, bronze medalist(s) | Arman Avagyan (ARM) |
| 3rd place, bronze medalist(s) | Carter Starocci (USA) |
| 5 | Georgios Kougioumtsidis (GRE) |
| 5 | Valentyn Babii (UKR) |
| 7 | Abdulvasi Balta (TUR) |
| 8 | Adam Thomson (CAN) |
| 9 | Ilan Bondar (ISR) |
| 10 | Kousuke Yamakura (JPN) |
| 11 | Ashraf Ashirov (AZE) |
| 12 | Tanguy Darbellay (SUI) |
| 13 | Tony Negron (PUR) |
| 14 | Miguel Ornelas (MEX) |
| 15 | Gabriel Iglesias (ESP) |
| 16 | Rasindu Pedige (SRI) |
| 17 | Stanislav Novac (MDA) |
| 18 | Zsombor Nagy (HUN) |
| 19 | Erik Reinbok (EST) |
| 20 | Ernest Dorosz (POL) |
| 21 | Oktay Hasan (BUL) |
| — | Mohammad Nokhodi (IRI) |
