= 2026 European Wrestling Championships – Men's freestyle 79 kg =

Wrestling competition

Men's freestyle 79 kg at the 2026 European Wrestling Championships
- Venue: Tirana Olympic Park
- Location: Tirana, Albania
- Dates: 24-25 April
- Competitors: 15

Medalists
gold medal	Akhmed Usmanov
silver medal	Mahamedkhabib Kadzimahamedau
bronze medal	Dzhabrail Gadzhiev	Azerbaijan
bronze medal	Zelimkhan Khadjiev	France

The men's freestyle 70 kg is a competition featured at the 2026 European Wrestling Championships, and was held in Tirana, Albania on April 24 and 25.

== Results ==
Legend

- F — Won by fall

=== Main bracket ===
Round of 16
Akhsarbek Gulaev (SVK)	5
Alans Amirovs (LAT)	0
Rasul Shapiev (MKD)	1
Mahamedkhabib Kadzimahamedau (UWW)	4
Aykan Seid (BUL)	4
Tariel Gaphrindashvili (GEO)	4^{F}
Akhmed Usmanov (UWW)	6
Hrayr Alikhanyan (ARM)	0
Egzon Xhoni (KOS)	0
Vitalii Malenkov (UKR)	11
Ion Laurențiu Marcu (MDA)	0
Mohammad Mottaghinia (ESP)	3
Okan Tahtacı (TUR)	8
Zelimkhan Khadjiev (FRA)	11

Quarterfinals
Dzhabrail Gadzhiev (AZE)	7
Akhsarbek Gulaev (SVK)	2
Mahamedkhabib Kadzimahamedau (UWW)	11
Tariel Gaphrindashvili (GEO)	10
Akhmed Usmanov (UWW)	10
Vitalii Malenkov (UKR)	0
Mohammad Mottaghinia (ESP)	5
Zelimkhan Khadjiev (FRA)	9

Semifinals
Dzhabrail Gadzhiev (AZE)	1
Mahamedkhabib Kadzimahamedau (UWW)	5
Akhmed Usmanov (UWW)	3
Zelimkhan Khadjiev (FRA)	0

Final
Mahamedkhabib Kadzimahamedau (UWW)	2
Akhmed Usmanov (UWW)	4

=== Repechage ===
Repechage round 1
Rasul Shapiev (MKD)	10
Tariel Gaphrindashvili (GEO)	1
Hrayr Alikhanyan (ARM)	10
Vitalii Malenkov (UKR)	0

Bronze medal matches
Rasul Shapiev (MKD)	0
Dzhabrail Gadzhiev (AZE)	8
Hrayr Alikhanyan (ARM)	1
Zelimkhan Khadjiev (FRA)	11

== Final standing ==
Rank	Athlete
1st place, gold medalist(s)	Akhmed Usmanov (UWW)
2nd place, silver medalist(s)	Mahamedkhabib Kadzimahamedau (UWW)
3rd place, bronze medalist(s)	Dzhabrail Gadzhiev (AZE)
3rd place, bronze medalist(s)	Zelimkhan Khadjiev (FRA)
5	Rasul Shapiev (MKD)
5	Hrayr Alikhanyan (ARM)
7	Tariel Gaphrindashvili (GEO)
8	Vitalii Malenkov (UKR)
9	Mohammad Mottaghinia (ESP)
10	Akhsarbek Gulaev (SVK)
11	Okan Tahtacı (TUR)
12	Aykan Seid (BUL)
13	Ion Laurențiu Marcu (MDA)
14	Alans Amirovs (LAT)
15	Egzon Xhoni (KOS)
