= 2021 U23 World Wrestling Championships – Men's freestyle 79 kg =

Wrestling Championship

The men's freestyle 79 kilograms is a competition featured at the 2021 U23 World Wrestling Championships, and was held in Belgrade, Serbia on 5 and 6 November.

== Medalists ==
Gold	Magomed Magomaev; Russia
Silver	Ramazan Sarı; Turkey
Bronze	Arman Avagyan; Armenia
Bronze	Ali Savadkouhi; Iran

== Results ==
Legend

- F — Won by fall
- WO — Won by walkover

=== Final ===
Final
Ramazan Sarı (TUR)	4
Magomed Magomaev (RUS)	4

=== Top half ===
Round of 32

Round of 16
Mukhammad Abdullaev (KGZ)	0
Botond Lukács (HUN)	2
Arman Avagyan (ARM)	9
Erik Reinbok (EST)	1
Goga Mamiauri (GEO)	7
Bibarys Nuryllauly (KAZ)	3
Ramazan Sarı (TUR)	10
Jake Marsh (USA)	0

Quarterfinals
Botond Lukács (HUN)	1
Arman Avagyan (ARM)	1
Goga Mamiauri (GEO)	0
Ramazan Sarı (TUR)	6

Semifinals
Arman Avagyan (ARM)	2
Ramazan Sarı (TUR)	11^{F}

=== Bottom half ===
Round of 32
Ali Savadkouhi (IRI)	4
Vicky Hooda (IND)	4
Tanguy Darbellay (SUI)	11
Otabek Salomov (UZB)	0
~~Foday Kargbo (SLE)~~
Andrija Ivanović (SRB)	WO
Ashraf Ashirov (AZE)	5
Damjingiin Batzul (MGL)	1
Eugeniu Mihalcean (MDA)	4
Valentyn Babii (UKR)	15

Round of 16
Magomed Magomaev (RUS)	10
Hammam Abusnaina (PLE)	0
Oktay Hasan (BUL)	0
Ali Savadkouhi (IRI)	10
Tanguy Darbellay (SUI)	2
Andrija Ivanović (SRB)	0
Ashraf Ashirov (AZE)	10
Valentyn Babii (UKR)	4

Quarterfinals
Magomed Magomaev (RUS)	7
Ali Savadkouhi (IRI)	0
Tanguy Darbellay (SUI)	0
Ashraf Ashirov (AZE)	10

Semifinals
Magomed Magomaev (RUS)	4
Ashraf Ashirov (AZE)	0

=== Repechage ===
Repechage round 2
Jake Marsh (USA)	4
Goga Mamiauri (GEO)	8
Hammam Abusnaina (PLE)	0
Ali Savadkouhi (IRI)	11

Bronze medals
Goga Mamiauri (GEO)	4
Arman Avagyan (ARM)	4
Ali Savadkouhi (IRI)	8
Ashraf Ashirov (AZE)	2
