= 2024 European Wrestling Championships – Men's freestyle 79 kg =

Wrestling competition

Men's freestyle 79 kg at the 2024 European Wrestling Championships
- Venue: Polyvalent Hall
- Location: Bucharest, Romania
- Dates: 16-17 February
- Competitors: 20

Medalists
gold medal	Akhmed Usmanov	Individual Neutral Athletes
silver medal	Mahamedkhabib Kadzimahamedau	Individual Neutral Athletes
bronze medal	Avtandil Kentchadze	Georgia
bronze medal	Frank Chamizo	Italy

The men's freestyle 79 kg is a competition featured at the 2024 European Wrestling Championships, and was held in Bucharest, Romania on February 16 and 17.

== Results ==
Legend

- F — Won by fall
- WO — Won by walkover

=== Final ===
Final
Akhmed Usmanov (AIN)	9
Mahamedkhabib Kadzimahamedau (AIN)	6

=== Top half ===
Round of 32
Dejan Mitrov (MKD)	1
Oleksii Domanytskyi (UKR)	12
Pouria Taherkhani (GER)	4
Iakub Shikhdzamalov (ROU)	4

Round of 16
Akhmed Usmanov (AIN)	7
Eugeniu Mihalcean (MDA)	0
Oleksii Domanytskyi (UKR)	4
Georgios Kougioumtsidis (GRE)	7
Arman Avagyan (ARM)	6
Iakub Shikhdzamalov (ROU)	6
Umar Mavlaev (SUI)	1
Avtandil Kentchadze (GEO)	12

Quarterfinals
Akhmed Usmanov (AIN)	7
Georgios Kougioumtsidis (GRE)	4
Arman Avagyan (ARM)	4
Avtandil Kentchadze (GEO)	8

Semifinals
Akhmed Usmanov (AIN)	3
Avtandil Kentchadze (GEO)	0

=== Bottom half ===
Round of 32
Miroslav Kirov (BUL)	0
Mahamedkhabib Kadzimahamedau (AIN)	4
Khetag Tsabolov (SRB)	1
Frank Chamizo (ITA)	2

Round of 16
Ramazan Sarı (TUR)	11
Kamil Rybicki (POL)	0
Mahamedkhabib Kadzimahamedau (AIN)	WO
Simon Marchl (AUT)
Erik Reinbok (EST)	0
Frank Chamizo (ITA)	6
Iman Mahdavi (UWW)	6
Orkhan Abasov (AZE)	9

Quarterfinals
Ramazan Sarı (TUR)	0
Mahamedkhabib Kadzimahamedau (AIN)	10
Frank Chamizo (ITA)	6
Orkhan Abasov (AZE)	5

Semifinals
Mahamedkhabib Kadzimahamedau (AIN)	4
Frank Chamizo (ITA)	0

=== Repechage ===
Repechage round 1
Miroslav Kirov (BUL)	WO
Simon Marchl (AUT)

Repechage round 2
Eugeniu Mihalcean (MDA)	2
Georgios Kougioumtsidis (GRE)	11
Miroslav Kirov (BUL)	0
Ramazan Sarı (TUR)	3

Bronze medal match
Georgios Kougioumtsidis (GRE)	4
Avtandil Kentchadze (GEO)	6
Ramazan Sarı (TUR)	1
Frank Chamizo (ITA)	5

== Final standing ==
Rank	Athlete
1st place, gold medalist(s)	Akhmed Usmanov (AIN)
2nd place, silver medalist(s)	Mahamedkhabib Kadzimahamedau (AIN)
3rd place, bronze medalist(s)	Avtandil Kentchadze (GEO)
3rd place, bronze medalist(s)	Frank Chamizo (ITA)
5	Georgios Kougioumtsidis (GRE)
5	Ramazan Sarı (TUR)
7	Oleksii Domanytskyi (UKR)
8	Miroslav Kirov (BUL)
9	Orkhan Abasov (AZE)
10	Iakub Shikhdzamalov (ROU)
11	Arman Avagyan (ARM)
12	Iman Mahdavi (UWW)
13	Pouria Taherkhani (GER)
14	Eugeniu Mihalcean (MDA)
15	Khetag Tsabolov (SRB)
16	Dejan Mitrov (MKD)
17	Umar Mavlaev (SUI)
18	Simon Marchl (AUT)
19	Erik Reinbok (EST)
20	Kamil Rybicki (POL)
