= 2023 Poland Open =

Poland wrestling tournament

2023 Ziolkowski, Pytlasinski, Poland Open
- Host city: Warsaw, Poland
- Dates: 26–30 July 2023
- Stadium: Arena Ursynów

Champions
- Freestyle: United States
- Greco-Roman: Poland
- Women: Poland

The 2023 Poland Open is a sport wrestling event was held in Warsaw, Poland between 26 and 30 July 2022. 27th Poland Open in Women's Wrestling, 32st Wacław Ziółkowski Memorial in Freestyle wrestling and 66th Władysław Pytlasiński Memorial in Greco – Roman.

== Event videos ==
The event will air freely on the SportZona YouTube channel.

Broadcast
26 July 2023 Mat 1	26 July 2023 Mat 2	26 July 2023 Mat 3
27 July 2023 Mat 1	27 July 2023 Mat 2	27 July 2023 Mat 3
28 July 2023 Mat 1	28 July 2023 Mat 2	28 July 2023 Mat 3
29 July 2023 Mat 1	29 July 2023 Mat 2	29 July 2023 Mat 3
30 July 2023 Mat 1	30 July 2023 Mat 2	30 July 2023 Mat 3

== Medal table ==
* Host nation (Poland)

Rank	Nation	Gold	Silver	Bronze	Total
1	United States	6	2	6	14
2	Ukraine	4	3	4	11
3	Azerbaijan	3	3	3	9
4	Poland*	2	8	13	23
5	Bulgaria	2	4	5	11
6	Norway	2	1	0	3
7	Ecuador	2	0	0	2
8	Germany	1	2	6	9
9	Hungary	1	1	2	4
10	Serbia	1	1	0	2
11	Canada	1	0	4	5
12	Croatia	1	0	2	3
13	Brazil	1	0	1	2
13	Czech Republic	1	0	1	2
13	France	1	0	1	2
16	Chile	1	0	0	1
17	Kazakhstan	0	2	3	5
18	Estonia	0	1	0	1
18	Puerto Rico	0	1	0	1
18	Sweden	0	1	0	1
21	Italy	0	0	2	2
21	Switzerland	0	0	2	2
23	Israel	0	0	1	1
23	Lithuania	0	0	1	1
23	Romania	0	0	1	1
Totals (25 entries)		30	30	58	118

== Team ranking ==
Rank	Men's freestyle		Men's Greco-Roman		Women's freestyle	
Rank	Team	Points	Team	Points	Team	Points
1	United States	121	Poland	112	Poland	89
2	Poland	100	Ukraine	104	Kazakhstan	62
3	Azerbaijan	71	Germany	66	Canada	60
4	Bulgaria	60	Bulgaria	57	Germany	53
5	Georgia	54	Serbia	30	United States	33
6	Switzerland	31	Croatia	26	Hungary	29
7	Hungary	21	Norway	23	France	29
8	Germany	14	Sweden	17	Bulgaria	27
9	Ukraine	12	Italy	15	Ukraine	27
9	Israel	12	Italy	15	Ukraine	27
9	Canada	12	Italy	15	Ukraine	27
10			Israel	11	Ecuador	20
10			Switzerland	11	Ecuador	20
10			Czech Republic	11	Ecuador	20

== Medal overview ==
=== Men's freestyle (Wacław Ziółkowski Memorial) ===
Event	Gold	Silver	Bronze
57 kg	Flynn Cooper; United States	Darian Cruz; Puerto Rico	Ivaylo Tisov; Bulgaria
57 kg	Flynn Cooper; United States	Darian Cruz; Puerto Rico	Vasyl Ilnytskyi; Poland
61 kg	Daton Fix; United States	Austin DeSanto; United States	Aliabbas Rzazade; Azerbaijan
61 kg	Daton Fix; United States	Austin DeSanto; United States	Nahshon Garrett; United States
65 kg	Andrew Alirez; United States	Mikyay Naim; Bulgaria	Haji Aliyev; Azerbaijan
65 kg	Andrew Alirez; United States	Mikyay Naim; Bulgaria	Krzysztof Bieńkowski; Poland
70 kg	Doug Zapf; United States	Magomed Khaniev; Azerbaijan	Dániel Antal; Hungary
70 kg	Doug Zapf; United States	Magomed Khaniev; Azerbaijan	Marc Dietsche; Switzerland
74 kg	Turan Bayramov; Azerbaijan	Dzhabrail Gadzhiyev; Azerbaijan	Khadzhimurad Gadzhiyev; Azerbaijan
74 kg	Turan Bayramov; Azerbaijan	Dzhabrail Gadzhiyev; Azerbaijan	Ramazan Ramazanov; Bulgaria
79 kg	David McFadden; United States	Mihail Georgiev; Bulgaria	Dustin Plott; United States
79 kg	David McFadden; United States	Mihail Georgiev; Bulgaria	Krisztian Biro; Romania
86 kg	Sebastian Jezierzański; Poland	Krzysztof Sadowik; Poland	Cezary Sadowski; Poland
86 kg	Sebastian Jezierzański; Poland	Krzysztof Sadowik; Poland	Dylan Fishback; United States
92 kg	Osman Nurmagomedov; Azerbaijan	Michał Bielawski; Poland	Michael Macchiavello; United States
92 kg	Osman Nurmagomedov; Azerbaijan	Michał Bielawski; Poland	Nick Stemmet; United States
97 kg	Zbigniew Baranowski; Poland	Radosław Baran; Poland	Akhmed Bataev; Bulgaria
97 kg	Zbigniew Baranowski; Poland	Radosław Baran; Poland	Erik Thiele; Germany
125 kg	Nick Gwiazdowski; United States	Giorgi Meshvildishvili; Azerbaijan	Kamil Kościółek; Poland
125 kg	Nick Gwiazdowski; United States	Giorgi Meshvildishvili; Azerbaijan	Robert Baran; Poland

=== Men's Greco-Roman (Władysław Pytlasiński Cup) ===
Event	Gold	Silver	Bronze
55 kg	Yevhen Pokovba; Ukraine	Mateusz Ropiak; Poland	Wojciech Kuźmiak; Poland
60 kg	Georgii Tibilov; Serbia	Michał Tracz; Poland	Melkamu Fetene; Israel
60 kg	Georgii Tibilov; Serbia	Michał Tracz; Poland	Christopher Kraemer; Germany
63 kg	Abu Muslim Amaev; Bulgaria	Mairbek Salimov; Poland	Andrii Semenchuk; Ukraine
67 kg	Morten Thoresen; Norway	Mate Nemeš; Serbia	Gevorg Sahakyan; Poland
67 kg	Morten Thoresen; Norway	Mate Nemeš; Serbia	Ivo Iliev; Bulgaria
72 kg	Stoyan Kubatov; Bulgaria	Artur Politaiev; Ukraine	Vladyslav Yevtushenko; Ukraine
72 kg	Stoyan Kubatov; Bulgaria	Artur Politaiev; Ukraine	Deyvid Dimitrov; Bulgaria
77 kg	Volodymyr Yakovliev; Ukraine	Andrii Kulyk; Ukraine	Riccardo Abbrescia; Italy
77 kg	Volodymyr Yakovliev; Ukraine	Andrii Kulyk; Ukraine	Antonio Kamenjašević; Croatia
82 kg	Božo Starčević; Croatia	Timmy Sköld; Sweden	Artur Ovsepyan; Ukraine
82 kg	Božo Starčević; Croatia	Timmy Sköld; Sweden	Filip Šačić; Croatia
87 kg	Exauce Mukubu; Norway	Yoan Dimitrov; Bulgaria	Ramon Betschart; Switzerland
87 kg	Exauce Mukubu; Norway	Yoan Dimitrov; Bulgaria	Arkadiusz Kułynycz; Poland
97 kg	Vladen Kozlyuk; Ukraine	Peter Öhler; Germany	Artur Omarov; Czech Republic
97 kg	Vladen Kozlyuk; Ukraine	Peter Öhler; Germany	Lucas Lazogianis; Germany
130 kg	Yasmani Acosta; Chile	Heiki Nabi; Estonia	Jello Krahmer; Germany
130 kg	Yasmani Acosta; Chile	Heiki Nabi; Estonia	Marcin Luto; Poland

=== Women's freestyle (Poland Open) ===
Event	Gold	Silver	Bronze
50 kg	Mariya Stadnik; Azerbaijan	Anna Łukasiak; Poland	Emanuela Liuzzi; Italy
50 kg	Mariya Stadnik; Azerbaijan	Anna Łukasiak; Poland	Katie Dutchak; Canada
53 kg	Lucía Yépez; Ecuador	Annika Wendle; Germany	Tetiana Profatilova; France
53 kg	Lucía Yépez; Ecuador	Annika Wendle; Germany	Roksana Zasina; Poland
55 kg	Karla Godinez; Canada	Erika Bognár; Hungary	Ainur Ashimova; Kazakhstan
55 kg	Karla Godinez; Canada	Erika Bognár; Hungary	Laura Stanelytė; Lithuania
57 kg	Giullia Penalber; Brazil	Anhelina Lysak; Poland	Jowita Wrzesień; Poland
57 kg	Giullia Penalber; Brazil	Anhelina Lysak; Poland	Magdalena Głodek; Poland
59 kg	Nikolett Szabó; Hungary	Oksana Moskalova; Ukraine	Diana Kayumova; Kazakhstan
59 kg	Nikolett Szabó; Hungary	Oksana Moskalova; Ukraine	Guldana Bekesh; Kazakhstan
62 kg	Luisa Niemesch; Germany	Grace Bullen; Norway	Laís Nunes; Brazil
62 kg	Luisa Niemesch; Germany	Grace Bullen; Norway	Ana Godinez; Canada
65 kg	Yulia Leskovets; Ukraine	Irina Kazyulina; Kazakhstan	Maya Letona; United States
65 kg	Yulia Leskovets; Ukraine	Irina Kazyulina; Kazakhstan	Anne Nürnberger; Germany
68 kg	Adéla Hanzlíčková; Czech Republic	Mimi Hristova; Bulgaria	Wiktoria Chołuj; Poland
68 kg	Adéla Hanzlíčková; Czech Republic	Mimi Hristova; Bulgaria	Noémi Szabados; Hungary
72 kg	Kendra Dacher; France	Anastassiya Panassovich; Kazakhstan	Olha Shchebetiuk; Ukraine
72 kg	Kendra Dacher; France	Anastassiya Panassovich; Kazakhstan	Faith Telford; Canada
76 kg	Génesis Reasco; Ecuador	Yelena Makoyed; United States	Francy Rädelt; Germany
76 kg	Génesis Reasco; Ecuador	Yelena Makoyed; United States	Taylor Follensbee; Canada

== Participating nations ==
348 wrestlers from 36 countries:

1. Angola (1)
2. Australia (1)
3. Azerbaijan (11)
4. Belgium (1)
5. Bulgaria (24)
6. Brazil (2)
7. Canada (18)
8. Chile (2)
9. China (2)
10. Croatia (6)
11. Czech Republic (5)
12. Denmark (1)
13. Ecuador (3)
14. Estonia (3)
15. France (10)
16. Georgia (13)
17. Germany (31)
18. Greece (1)
19. Hungary (11)
20. Israel (7)
21. Italy (7)
22. Kazakhstan (15)
23. Latvia (1)
24. Lithuania (11)
25. Netherlands (1)
26. New Zealand (3)
27. Norway (16)
28. Poland (67) (Host)
29. Puerto Rico (1)
30. Romania (1)
31. Serbia (6)
32. Switzerland (11)
33. Sweden (5)
34. Ukraine (25)
35. United States (25)
36. Venezuela (1)
37. UWW (1)

== Results ==
Legend

- Ret — Retired
- WO — Won by walkover

=== Men's freestyle (Wacław Ziółkowski Memorial) ===
==== Men's freestyle 57 kg ====
	Score	
Round 1
Vasyl Ilnytskyi (POL)	12–2	Guesseppe Rea (ECU)
Thomas Epp (SUI)	0–2	Cooper Flynn (USA)
Darian Cruz (PUR)	2–1	Treye Trotman (CAN)
Dylan Bray (CAN)	8–4	Suraj Singh (NZL)
Round 2
Guesseppe Rea (ECU)	WO	Thomas Epp (SUI)
Treye Trotman (CAN)	10–0	Suraj Singh (NZL)
Ivaylo Tisov (BUL)	12–2	Vasyl Ilnytskyi (POL)
Round 3
Thomas Epp (SUI)	0–5	Treye Trotman (CAN)
Ivaylo Tisov (BUL)	6–8 Fall	Cooper Flynn (USA)
Darian Cruz (PUR)	10–0	Dylan Bray (CAN)
Final III–V
Ivaylo Tisov (BUL)	7–5	Treye Trotman (CAN)
Vasyl Ilnytskyi (POL)	10–0	Dylan Bray (CAN)
Final I–II
Cooper Flynn (USA)	4–1	Darian Cruz (PUR)

==== Men's freestyle 61 kg ====
	Score	
Round 1
Nahshon Garrett (USA)	10–11	Aliabbas Rzazade (AZE)
Austin DeSanto (USA)	11–0	Daviti Abdaladze (GEO)
Daton Fix (USA)	10–0	Ramaz Turmanidze (GEO)
Nils Leutert (SUI)	2–12	Georgi Vangelov (BUL)
Round 2
Nahshon Garrett (USA)	10–0	Daviti Abdaladze (GEO)
Ramaz Turmanidze (GEO)	13–3	Nils Leutert (SUI)
David Almendra (ARG)	0–2 Fall	Aliabbas Rzazade (AZE)
Round 3
Nahshon Garrett (USA)	10–0	David Almendra (ARG)
Aliabbas Rzazade (AZE)	3–4	Austin DeSanto (USA)
Daton Fix (USA)	5–1	Georgi Vangelov (BUL)
Final III–V
Aliabbas Rzazade (AZE)	4–0 Ret	Ramaz Turmanidze (GEO)
Nahshon Garrett (USA)	14–5	Georgi Vangelov (BUL)
Final I–II
Austin DeSanto (USA)	3–6	Daton Fix (USA)

==== Men's freestyle 65 kg ====
	Score	
Round 1
Krzysztof Bieńkowski (POL)	1–5	Haji Aliyev (AZE)
Tornike Katamadze (GEO)	10–0	Adam Al Kandoussi (NED)
Luka Janezashvili (GEO)	8–7	Gamzatgadzsi Halidov (HUN)
Aminjon Sadulloev (POL)	0–8	Nino Leutert (SUI)
Giorgi Shonia (GEO)	7–11	Mikyay Naim (BUL)
Josh Finesilver (ISR)	8–2	Pat Lugo (USA)
Round 2
Krzysztof Bieńkowski (POL)	10–0	Adam Al Kandoussi (NED)
Gamzatgadzsi Halidov (HUN)	11–0	Aminjon Sadulloev (POL)
Giorgi Shonia (GEO)	11–9	Pat Lugo (USA)
Andrew Alirez (USA)	8–0	Haji Aliyev (AZE)
Tornike Katamadze (GEO)	8–6	Luka Janezashvili (GEO)
Nino Leutert (SUI)	2–7	Mikyay Naim (BUL)
Round 3
Krzysztof Bieńkowski (POL)	5–0 Ret	Gamzatgadzsi Halidov (HUN)
Giorgi Shonia (GEO)	1–4	Haji Aliyev (AZE)
Luka Janezashvili (GEO)	4–3	Nino Leutert (SUI)
Josh Finesilver (ISR)	0–10	Andrew Alirez (USA)
Tornike Katamadze (GEO)	0–10	Mikyay Naim (BUL)
Round 4
Krzysztof Bieńkowski (POL)	6–4	Luka Janezashvili (GEO)
Final III–V
Josh Finesilver (ISR)	0–4 Fall	Haji Aliyev (AZE)
Krzysztof Bieńkowski (POL)	5–0	Tornike Katamadze (GEO)
Final I–II
Andrew Alirez (USA)	WO	Mikyay Naim (BUL)

==== Men's freestyle 70 kg ====
	Score	
Round 1
Doug Zapf (USA)	10–0	Mateusz Łuszczyński (POL)
Nika Bushelashvili (GEO)	4–1	Giorgi Rigvava (GEO)
Ibragim Veliev (BEL)	20–10	Patryk Ołenczyn (POL)
Ivan Stoyanov (BUL)	1–11	Dániel Antal (HUN)
Sandro Sardanashvili (GEO)	0–11	Magomed Bashir Khaniev (AZE)
Round 2
Mateusz Łuszczyński (POL)	0–10	Giorgi Rigvava (GEO)
Patryk Ołenczyn (POL)	WO	Ivan Stoyanov (BUL)
Marc Dietsche (SUI)	0–10	Doug Zapf (USA)
Nika Bushelashvili (GEO)	3–0	Ibragim Veliev (BEL)
Round 3
Sandro Sardanashvili (GEO)	6–0 Fall	Giorgi Rigvava (GEO)
Ivan Stoyanov (BUL)	1–7	Marc Dietsche (SUI)
Doug Zapf (USA)	6–2 Fall	Nika Bushelashvili (GEO)
Dániel Antal (HUN)	2–10	Magomed Bashir Khaniev (AZE)
Round 4
Ibragim Veliev (BEL)	4–6	Sandro Sardanashvili (GEO)
Final III–V
Nika Bushelashvili (GEO)	1–4	Marc Dietsche (SUI)
Sandro Sardanashvili (GEO)	8–11 Fall	Dániel Antal (HUN)
Final I–II
Doug Zapf (USA)	6–2	Magomed Bashir Khaniev (AZE)

==== Men's freestyle 74 kg ====
	Score	
Round 1
Jasmit Phulka (CAN)	4–6	Szymon Wojtkowski (POL)
Turan Bayramov (AZE)	5–1	Georgios Kougioumtsidis (GRE)
Tobias Portmann (SUI)	7–0	Wojciech Wysocki (POL)
Luka Chkhitunidze (GEO)	1–11	Khadzhimurad Gadzhiyev (AZE)
Adam Thomson (CAN)	2–4	Kamil Rybicki (POL)
Dzhabrail Gadzhiev (AZE)	10–10	Ali-Pasha Umarpashaev (BUL)
Mitch Finesilver (ISR)	4–11	Ramazan Ramazanov (BUL)
Cole Hawkins (NZL)	0–10	Derek Gilcher (USA)
Round 2
Jasmit Phulka (CAN)	0–10	Georgios Kougioumtsidis (GRE)
Wojciech Wysocki (POL)	0–11	Luka Chkhitunidze (GEO)
Adam Thomson (CAN)	14–9	Ali-Pasha Umarpashaev (BUL)
Mitch Finesilver (ISR)	10–0	Cole Hawkins (NZL)
Szymon Wojtkowski (POL)	0–2 Fall	Turan Bayramov (AZE)
Tobias Portmann (SUI)	1–7	Khadzhimurad Gadzhiyev (AZE)
Kamil Rybicki (POL)	0–9	Dzhabrail Gadzhiev (AZE)
Ramazan Ramazanov (BUL)	6–3	Derek Gilcher (USA)
Round 3
Georgios Kougioumtsidis (GRE)	5–2	Luka Chkhitunidze (GEO)
Adam Thomson (CAN)	0–3	Mitch Finesilver (ISR)
Szymon Wojtkowski (POL)	1–2	Tobias Portmann (SUI)
Kamil Rybicki (POL)	6–3	Derek Gilcher (USA)
Turan Bayramov (AZE)	9–1	Khadzhimurad Gadzhiyev (AZE)
Dzhabrail Gadzhiev (AZE)	5–4	Ramazan Ramazanov (BUL)
Round 4
Georgios Kougioumtsidis (GRE)	12–1	Mitch Finesilver (ISR)
Tobias Portmann (SUI)	1–3	Kamil Rybicki (POL)
Final III–V
Khadzhimurad Gadzhiyev (AZE)	WO	Georgios Kougioumtsidis (GRE)
Kamil Rybicki (POL)	4–10	Ramazan Ramazanov (BUL)
Final I–II
Turan Bayramov (AZE)	2–2	Dzhabrail Gadzhiev (AZE)

==== Men's freestyle 79 kg ====
	Score	
Round 1
Dustin Plott (USA)	5–3	Denys Pavlov (UKR)
Erik Reinbok (EST)	0–2	Mihail Georgiev (BUL)
Krisztian Biro (ROU)	11–7	Iman Mahdavi (UWW)
David McFadden (USA)	10–0	Bartłomiej Słowak (POL)
Round 2
Denys Pavlov (UKR)	8–1	Erik Reinbok (EST)
Iman Mahdavi (UWW)	10–2 Fall	Bartłomiej Słowak (POL)
Donnell Washington (USA)	11–22	Dustin Plott (USA)
Round 3
Denys Pavlov (UKR)	20–10	Donnell Washington (USA)
Dustin Plott (USA)	2–3	Mihail Georgiev (BUL)
Krisztian Biro (ROU)	2–6	David McFadden (USA)
Final III–V
Dustin Plott (USA)	10–0	Iman Mahdavi (UWW)
Denys Pavlov (UKR)	4–10	Krisztian Biro (ROU)
Final I–II
Mihail Georgiev (BUL)	1–2	David McFadden (USA)

==== Men's freestyle 86 kg ====
	Score	
Round 1
Brayden Thompson (USA)	2–7	Daviti Koguashvili (GEO)
Tamaz Nikoleishvili (GEO)	1–4	Stefan Reichmuth (SUI)
Sebastian Jezierzański (POL)	7–0	Patrik Püspöki (HUN)
Andrew Terry Johnson (CAN)	1–6	Uri Kalashnikov (ISR)
Aimar Andruse (EST)	0–10	Cezary Sadowski (POL)
Dylan Fishback (USA)	11–0	Domantas Pauliuščenko (LTU)
Krzysztof Sadowik (POL)	10–0	Osmans Dzaseževs (LAT)
Round 2
Brayden Thompson (USA)	2–4	Tamaz Nikoleishvili (GEO)
Patrik Püspöki (HUN)	5–1	Andrew Terry Johnson (CAN)
Aimar Andruse (EST)	3–4	Domantas Pauliuščenko (LTU)
Daviti Koguashvili (GEO)	4–1 Fall	Stefan Reichmuth (SUI)
Sebastian Jezierzański (POL)	9–0	Uri Kalashnikov (ISR)
Cezary Sadowski (POL)	6–7	Dylan Fishback (USA)
Round 3
Osmans Dzaseževs (LAT)	0–10	Tamaz Nikoleishvili (GEO)
Patrik Püspöki (HUN)	2–4	Domantas Pauliuščenko (LTU)
Stefan Reichmuth (SUI)	2–1	Uri Kalashnikov (ISR)
Krzysztof Sadowik (POL)	8–3	Daviti Koguashvili (GEO)
Sebastian Jezierzański (POL)	5–1	Dylan Fishback (USA)
Round 4
Cezary Sadowski (POL)	10–0	Tamaz Nikoleishvili (GEO)
Domantas Pauliuščenko (LTU)	1–5	Stefan Reichmuth (SUI)
Final III–V
Daviti Koguashvili (GEO)	1–10	Cezary Sadowski (POL)
Stefan Reichmuth (SUI)	0–8	Dylan Fishback (USA)
Final I–II
Krzysztof Sadowik (POL)	2–3	Sebastian Jezierzański (POL)

==== Men's freestyle 92 kg ====
	Score	
Round 1
Balázs Juhász (HUN)	0–5	Michał Bielawski (POL)
Filip Rogut (POL)	0–9	Osman Nurmagomedov (AZE)
Nick Stemmet (USA)	0–10	Michael Macchiavello (USA)
Round 2
Nick Stemmet (USA)	10–4	Filip Rogut (POL)
Michael Macchiavello (USA)	2–8	Osman Nurmagomedov (AZE)
Nazar Dod (UKR)	2–4	Balázs Juhász (HUN)
Round 3
Nick Stemmet (USA)	0–11	Osman Nurmagomedov (AZE)
Michael Macchiavello (USA)	10–0	Filip Rogut (POL)
Michał Bielawski (POL)	6–4	Nazar Dod (UKR)
Final III–V
Michael Macchiavello (USA)	11–0	Nazar Dod (UKR)
Balázs Juhász (HUN)	5–7	Nick Stemmet (USA)
Final I–II
Osman Nurmagomedov (AZE)	10–0	Michał Bielawski (POL)

==== Men's freestyle 97 kg ====
	Score	
Round 1
Radosław Baran (POL)	7–5	Akhmed Bataev (BUL)
Ricardo Báez (ARG)	1–4	Morgan Smith (USA)
Lukas Krasauskas (LTU)	2–6	Samuel Scherrer (SUI)
Erik Thiele (GER)	3–1	Saba Gamtenadze (GEO)
Zbigniew Baranowski (POL)	10–3	Richárd Végh (HUN)
Round 2
Akhmed Bataev (BUL)	11–0	Ricardo Báez (ARG)
Lukas Krasauskas (LTU)	0–4	Saba Gamtenadze (GEO)
Radosław Baran (POL)	10–0	Morgan Smith (USA)
Round 3
Richárd Végh (HUN)	4–6	Akhmed Bataev (BUL)
Saba Gamtenadze (GEO)	0–5	Morgan Smith (USA)
Radosław Baran (POL)	6–2	Samuel Scherrer (SUI)
Erik Thiele (GER)	3–4	Zbigniew Baranowski (POL)
Final III–V
Samuel Scherrer (SUI)	WO	Akhmed Bataev (BUL)
Morgan Smith (USA)	0–11	Erik Thiele (GER)
Final I–II
Radosław Baran (POL)	1–5	Zbigniew Baranowski (POL)

==== Men's freestyle 125 kg ====
	Score	
Round 1
Giorgi Meshvildishvili (AZE)	11–0	Georgi Ivanov (BUL)
Giga Shavadze (GEO)	2–9	Gennadij Cudinovic (GER)
Nick Gwiazdowski (USA)	8–0 Fall	Islam Adizov (BUL)
Robert Baran (POL)	1–1	Kamil Kościółek (POL)
Round 2
Georgi Ivanov (BUL)	3–0	Giga Shavadze (GEO)
Islam Adizov (BUL)	1–3	Kamil Kościółek (POL)
Giorgi Meshvildishvili (AZE)	6–4 Fall	Gennadij Cudinovic (GER)
Nick Gwiazdowski (USA)	6–1	Robert Baran (POL)
Final III–V
Gennadij Cudinovic (GER)	WO	Kamil Kościółek (POL)
Georgi Ivanov (BUL)	0–10	Robert Baran (POL)
Final I–II
Giorgi Meshvildishvili (AZE)	2–9	Nick Gwiazdowski (USA)

=== Men's Greco-Roman (Władysław Pytlasiński Cup) ===
==== Men's Greco-Roman 55 kg ====
	Score	
Round 1
Wojciech Kuźmiak (POL)	0–7	Mateusz Ropiak (POL)
Round 2
Yevhen Pokovba (UKR)	8–0	Wojciech Kuźmiak (POL)
Round 3
Mateusz Ropiak (POL)	0–8	Yevhen Pokovba (UKR)

==== Men's Greco-Roman 60 kg ====
	Score	
Round 1
Gracjan Jedut (POL)	1–5	Abere Fetene (ISR)
Grzegorz Kunkel (POL)	4–7	Nedyalko Petrov (BUL)
Melkamu Fetene (ISR)	1–3	Georgios Scarpello (GER)
Jacopo Sandron (ITA)	0–9	Michał Tracz (POL)
Christopher Kraemer (GER)	1–1	Georgii Tibilov (SRB)
Vladyslav Kuzko (UKR)	2–1	Etienne Kinsinger (GER)
Round 2
Gracjan Jedut (POL)	0–2	Grzegorz Kunkel (POL)
Melkamu Fetene (ISR)	5–3	Jacopo Sandron (ITA)
Christopher Kraemer (GER)	2–1 Ret	Etienne Kinsinger (GER)
Abere Fetene (ISR)	0–9	Nedyalko Petrov (BUL)
Georgios Scarpello (GER)	0–9	Michał Tracz (POL)
Round 3
Grzegorz Kunkel (POL)	0–6	Melkamu Fetene (ISR)
Christopher Kraemer (GER)	9–1	Abere Fetene (ISR)
Nedyalko Petrov (BUL)	1–3	Michał Tracz (POL)
Georgii Tibilov (SRB)	3–1	Vladyslav Kuzko (UKR)
Round 4
Georgios Scarpello (GER)	0–8	Christopher Kraemer (GER)
Final III–V
Nedyalko Petrov (BUL)	0–8	Melkamu Fetene (ISR)
Christopher Kraemer (GER)	6–1	Vladyslav Kuzko (UKR)
Final I–II
Michał Tracz (POL)	0–7	Georgii Tibilov (SRB)

==== Men's Greco-Roman 63 kg ====
	Score	
Round 1
Andrii Semenchuk (UKR)	3–11	Mairbek Salimov (POL)
Round 2
Abu Muslim Amaev (BUL)	6–0 Fall	Andrii Semenchuk (UKR)
Round 3
Mairbek Salimov (POL)	0–9	Abu Muslim Amaev (BUL)

==== Men's Greco-Roman 67 kg ====
	Score	
Round 1
Mateusz Bernatek (POL)	5–3	Gevorg Sahakyan (POL)
Ilia Mustakov (BUL)	1–3	Oleh Khalilov (UKR)
Mate Nemeš (SRB)	6–0	Andreas Vetsch (SUI)
Roman Pacurkowski (POL)	13–5	Marco Stoll (GER)
Niklas Öhlén (SWE)	3–3	Morten Thoresen (NOR)
Maksym Liu (UKR)	4–3	Néstor Almanza (CHI)
Ivo Iliev (BUL)	8–4	Kamil Czarnecki (POL)
Witalis Lazovski (GER)	10–2	Shon Nadorgin (ISR)
Round 2
Gevorg Sahakyan (POL)	5–1	Ilia Mustakov (BUL)
Andreas Vetsch (SUI)	3–3	Marco Stoll (GER)
Niklas Öhlén (SWE)	2–1	Néstor Almanza (CHI)
Kamil Czarnecki (POL)	10–1	Shon Nadorgin (ISR)
Mateusz Bernatek (POL)	WO	Oleh Khalilov (UKR)
Mate Nemeš (SRB)	4–3	Roman Pacurkowski (POL)
Morten Thoresen (NOR)	10–0	Maksym Liu (UKR)
Ivo Iliev (BUL)	5–0	Witalis Lazovski (GER)
Round 3
Gevorg Sahakyan (POL)	6–3	Andreas Vetsch (SUI)
Niklas Öhlén (SWE)	11–5 Fall	Kamil Czarnecki (POL)
Mateusz Bernatek (POL)	WO	Roman Pacurkowski (POL)
Maksym Liu (UKR)	WO	Witalis Lazovski (GER)
Oleh Khalilov (UKR)	1–3	Mate Nemeš (SRB)
Morten Thoresen (NOR)	9–1 Fall	Ivo Iliev (BUL)
Round 4
Gevorg Sahakyan (POL)	3–1	Niklas Öhlén (SWE)
Roman Pacurkowski (POL)	9–0	Maksym Liu (UKR)
Final III–V
Oleh Khalilov (UKR)	1–5 Fall	Gevorg Sahakyan (POL)
Roman Pacurkowski (POL)	0–9	Ivo Iliev (BUL)
Final I–II
Mate Nemeš (SRB)	1–1	Morten Thoresen (NOR)

==== Men's Greco-Roman 72 kg ====
	Score	
Round 1
Piotr Stolarczyk (POL)	3–2	Christoffer Dahlén (SWE)
Aleksander Mielewczyk (POL)	1–8	Michael Widmayer (GER)
Vilius Savickas (LTU)	9–1	Gilani Dzortov (NOR)
Stoyan Kubatov (BUL)	9–0	Eimantas Vilimas (LTU)
Piotr Lewandowski (POL)	0–9	Deyvid Dimitrov (BUL)
Michał Puchalski (POL)	1–3	Vladyslav Yevtushenko (UKR)
Round 2
Christoffer Dahlén (SWE)	3–9	Aleksander Mielewczyk (POL)
Gilani Dzortov (NOR)	4–13	Eimantas Vilimas (LTU)
Piotr Lewandowski (POL)	1–1	Michał Puchalski (POL)
Artur Politaiev (UKR)	9–0	Piotr Stolarczyk (POL)
Michael Widmayer (GER)	6–2	Vilius Savickas (LTU)
Stoyan Kubatov (BUL)	6–0	Deyvid Dimitrov (BUL)
Round 3
Aleksander Mielewczyk (POL)	WO	Eimantas Vilimas (LTU)
Piotr Lewandowski (POL)	1–6	Piotr Stolarczyk (POL)
Vilius Savickas (LTU)	0–9	Deyvid Dimitrov (BUL)
Vladyslav Yevtushenko (UKR)	1–3	Artur Politaiev (UKR)
Michael Widmayer (GER)	0–5	Stoyan Kubatov (BUL)
Round 4
Aleksander Mielewczyk (POL)	9–0	Piotr Stolarczyk (POL)
Final III–V
Vladyslav Yevtushenko (UKR)	1–1	Aleksander Mielewczyk (POL)
Deyvid Dimitrov (BUL)	1–1	Michael Widmayer (GER)
Final I–II
Artur Politaiev (UKR)	7–8	Stoyan Kubatov (BUL)

==== Men's Greco-Roman 77 kg ====
	Score	
Round 1
Idris Ibaev (GER)	1–5	Deni Nakaev (GER)
Roland Schwarz (GER)	1–1	Paulius Galkinas (LTU)
Mateusz Borysewicz-Woźnicki (POL)	0–8	Riccardo Abbrescia (ITA)
Maksym Zakharchuk (POL)	1–6	Fabio Dietsche (SUI)
John Yeats (CAN)	0–8	Konrad Kozłowski (POL)
Antonio Kamenjašević (CRO)	5–1	Patryk Bednarz (POL)
Elmar Nuraliiev (UKR)	4–4	Aleksa Ilić (SRB)
Luca Dariozzi (ITA)	1–4	Erik Persson (SWE)
Oliver Krüger (DEN)	6–7	Volodymyr Yakovliev (UKR)
Pavel Puklavec (CRO)	1–3	Ihor Bychkov (UKR)
Round 2
Idris Ibaev (GER)	5–2	Paulius Galkinas (LTU)
Mateusz Borysewicz-Woźnicki (POL)	0–9	Maksym Zakharchuk (POL)
John Yeats (CAN)	WO	Patryk Bednarz (POL)
Aleksa Ilić (SRB)	7–3	Luca Dariozzi (ITA)
Oliver Krüger (DEN)	11–2	Pavel Puklavec (CRO)
Andrii Kulyk (UKR)	6–5	Deni Nakaev (GER)
Roland Schwarz (GER)	3–7	Riccardo Abbrescia (ITA)
Fabio Dietsche (SUI)	0–8	Konrad Kozłowski (POL)
Antonio Kamenjašević (CRO)	8–5	Elmar Nuraliiev (UKR)
Erik Persson (SWE)	3–4	Volodymyr Yakovliev (UKR)
Round 3
Idris Ibaev (GER)	11–0	Maksym Zakharchuk (POL)
Patryk Bednarz (POL)	0–9	Aleksa Ilić (SRB)
Oliver Krüger (DEN)	4–3	Deni Nakaev (GER)
Roland Schwarz (GER)	9–0	Fabio Dietsche (SUI)
Elmar Nuraliiev (UKR)	0–7 Fall	Erik Persson (SWE)
Ihor Bychkov (UKR)	1–1	Andrii Kulyk (UKR)
Riccardo Abbrescia (ITA)	10–2	Konrad Kozłowski (POL)
Round 4
Idris Ibaev (GER)	2–3	Aleksa Ilić (SRB)
Oliver Krüger (DEN)	0–5	Roland Schwarz (GER)
Erik Persson (SWE)	3–1	Ihor Bychkov (UKR)
Andrii Kulyk (UKR)	6–0 Fall	Riccardo Abbrescia (ITA)
Antonio Kamenjašević (CRO)	3–4	Volodymyr Yakovliev (UKR)
Round 5
Konrad Kozłowski (POL)	0–4 Ret	Aleksa Ilić (SRB)
Roland Schwarz (GER)	8–0	Erik Persson (SWE)
Final III–V
Riccardo Abbrescia (ITA)	5–1	Aleksa Ilić (SRB)
Roland Schwarz (GER)	1–3	Antonio Kamenjašević (CRO)
Final I–II
Andrii Kulyk (UKR)	1–5	Volodymyr Yakovliev (UKR)

==== Men's Greco-Roman 82 kg ====
	Score	
Round 1
Ivo Švígler (CZE)	2–5 Fall	Erik Löser (GER)
Wojciech Iwanowski (POL)	1–5	Filip Šačić (CRO)
Ruslan Koniev (UKR)	0–9	Artur Ovsepyan (UKR)
Arsenas Stankevičius (LTU)	0–9	Božo Starčević (CRO)
Marc Weber (SUI)	1–6	Branko Kovačević (SRB)
Piotr Chełek (POL)	0–3 Ret	Svetoslav Nikolov (BUL)
Round 2
Ivo Švígler (CZE)	2–8	Wojciech Iwanowski (POL)
Ruslan Koniev (UKR)	6–1	Arsenas Stankevičius (LTU)
Marc Weber (SUI)	WO	Svetoslav Nikolov (BUL)
Timmy Sköld (SWE)	9–0	Erik Löser (GER)
Filip Šačić (CRO)	1–2	Artur Ovsepyan (UKR)
Božo Starčević (CRO)	6–0	Branko Kovačević (SRB)
Round 3
Wojciech Iwanowski (POL)	1–4	Ruslan Koniev (UKR)
Marc Weber (SUI)	1–9	Erik Löser (GER)
Filip Šačić (CRO)	3–0 Fall	Branko Kovačević (SRB)
Piotr Chełek (POL)	0–9	Timmy Sköld (SWE)
Artur Ovsepyan (UKR)	4–13	Božo Starčević (CRO)
Round 4
Ruslan Koniev (UKR)	3–1	Erik Löser (GER)
Final III–V
Piotr Chełek (POL)	0–5 Fall	Artur Ovsepyan (UKR)
Ruslan Koniev (UKR)	1–5	Filip Šačić (CRO)
Final I–II
Timmy Sköld (SWE)	2–8	Božo Starčević (CRO)

==== Men's Greco-Roman 87 kg ====
	Score	
Round 1
Patryk Robaszek (POL)	3–5 Fall	Damian Matveiko (LTU)
Yoan Dimitrov (BUL)	5–3	Hannes Wagner (GER)
Exauce Mukubu (NOR)	9–3	Arkadiusz Kułynycz (POL)
Ioannis Narlidis (CAN)	0–9	Yaroslav Filchakov (UKR)
Szymon Szymonowicz (POL)	2–0	Mykyta Alieksieiev (UKR)
Islam Aliev (POL)	0–9	Ramon Betschart (SUI)
Mateusz Iwanowski (POL)	0–8	Mirco Minguzzi (ITA)
Round 2
Patryk Robaszek (POL)	0–8	Hannes Wagner (GER)
Arkadiusz Kułynycz (POL)	11–2	Ioannis Narlidis (CAN)
Mykyta Alieksieiev (UKR)	8–0	Islam Aliev (POL)
Damian Matveiko (LTU)	0–8	Yoan Dimitrov (BUL)
Exauce Mukubu (NOR)	3–3	Yaroslav Filchakov (UKR)
Szymon Szymonowicz (POL)	5–0	Ramon Betschart (SUI)
Round 3
Mateusz Iwanowski (POL)	0–8	Hannes Wagner (GER)
Arkadiusz Kułynycz (POL)	6–3	Mykyta Alieksieiev (UKR)
Damian Matveiko (LTU)	0–8	Yaroslav Filchakov (UKR)
Mirco Minguzzi (ITA)	4–8	Yoan Dimitrov (BUL)
Exauce Mukubu (NOR)	4–1	Szymon Szymonowicz (POL)
Round 4
Ramon Betschart (SUI)	6–6	Hannes Wagner (GER)
Arkadiusz Kułynycz (POL)	1–1	Yaroslav Filchakov (UKR)
Final III–V
Mirco Minguzzi (ITA)	4–6	Ramon Betschart (SUI)
Arkadiusz Kułynycz (POL)	1–1	Szymon Szymonowicz (POL)
Final I–II
Yoan Dimitrov (BUL)	5–9	Exauce Mukubu (NOR)

==== Men's Greco-Roman 97 kg ====
	Score	
Round 1
Artsiom Shumski (POL)	5–6	Artur Omarov (CZE)
Vladlen Kozlyuk (UKR)	8–0	Anton Vieweg (GER)
Valentyn Shkliarenko (UKR)	1–8	Lucas Lazogianis (GER)
Luka Katić (SRB)	0–8	Peter Öhler (GER)
August Eriksson (SWE)	3–3	Marcus Worren (NOR)
Jakub Antoszewski (POL)	5–0 Fall	Igor Shepetun (POL)
Gerard Kurniczak (POL)	5–0	Filip Smetko (CRO)
Round 2
Artsiom Shumski (POL)	1–3	Anton Vieweg (GER)
Valentyn Shkliarenko (UKR)	3–5	Luka Katić (SRB)
August Eriksson (SWE)	0–9	Igor Shepetun (POL)
Yurii Dorohan (UKR)	1–9	Artur Omarov (CZE)
Vladlen Kozlyuk (UKR)	5–1	Lucas Lazogianis (GER)
Peter Öhler (GER)	2–1	Marcus Worren (NOR)
Jakub Antoszewski (POL)	3–7	Gerard Kurniczak (POL)
Round 3
Filip Smetko (CRO)	1–3	Anton Vieweg (GER)
Luka Katić (SRB)	10–0	Igor Shepetun (POL)
Yurii Dorohan (UKR)	0–3 Fall	Lucas Lazogianis (GER)
Marcus Worren (NOR)	8–0	Jakub Antoszewski (POL)
Artur Omarov (CZE)	0–6 Fall	Vladlen Kozlyuk (UKR)
Peter Öhler (GER)	1–1	Gerard Kurniczak (POL)
Round 4
Anton Vieweg (GER)	6–6	Luka Katić (SRB)
Lucas Lazogianis (GER)	9–0	Marcus Worren (NOR)
Final III–V
Artur Omarov (CZE)	10–0	Anton Vieweg (GER)
Lucas Lazogianis (GER)	5–1	Gerard Kurniczak (POL)
Final I–II
Vladlen Kozlyuk (UKR)	5–0 Fall	Peter Öhler (GER)

==== Men's Greco-Roman 130 kg ====
	Score	
Round 1
Marcel Albini (CZE)	1–8	Vladyslav Voronyi (UKR)
Heiki Nabi (EST)	4–3	Rafał Krajewski (POL)
Marcin Luto (POL)	6–0	Bartłomiej Figura (POL)
Yasmani Acosta (CHI)	5–1	Mariyan Marinov (BUL)
Round 2
Marcel Albini (CZE)	2–11	Rafał Krajewski (POL)
Bartłomiej Figura (POL)	0–10	Mariyan Marinov (BUL)
Jello Krahmer (GER)	9–1	Vladyslav Voronyi (UKR)
Round 3
Rafał Krajewski (POL)	0–8	Mariyan Marinov (BUL)
Jello Krahmer (GER)	1–3	Heiki Nabi (EST)
Marcin Luto (POL)	0–9	Yasmani Acosta (CHI)
Final III–V
Jello Krahmer (GER)	8–0	Mariyan Marinov (BUL)
Vladyslav Voronyi (UKR)	1–2	Marcin Luto (POL)
Final I–II
Heiki Nabi (EST)	1–1	Yasmani Acosta (CHI)

=== Women's freestyle (Poland Open) ===
==== Women's freestyle 50 kg ====
	Score	
Round 1
Anna Łukasiak (POL)	7–2	Maral Tangirbergenova (KAZ)
Julie Sabatié (FRA)	10–0	Gabija Dilytė (LTU)
Amanda Tomczyk (POL)	10–0	Vestina Danisevičiūtė (LTU)
Mariya Stadnik (AZE)	2–0 Fall	Katie Dutchak (CAN)
Madison Parks (CAN)	6–3 Fall	Agata Walerzak (POL)
Juliana Valencia Velez (AUS)	0–4 Fall	Jaslynn Gallegos (USA)
Madina Zheniskyzy (KAZ)	0–10	Emanuela Liuzzi (ITA)
Round 2
Maral Tangirbergenova (KAZ)	0–4 Fall	Gabija Dilytė (LTU)
Vestina Danisevičiūtė (LTU)	0–4 Fall	Katie Dutchak (CAN)
Agata Walerzak (POL)	11–0	Juliana Valencia Velez (AUS)
Anna Łukasiak (POL)	9–1	Julie Sabatié (FRA)
Amanda Tomczyk (POL)	0–6 Fall	Mariya Stadnik (AZE)
Madison Parks (CAN)	4–7 Fall	Jaslynn Gallegos (USA)
Round 3
Madina Zheniskyzy (KAZ)	4–15	Gabija Dilytė (LTU)
Katie Dutchak (CAN)	2–6 Fall	Agata Walerzak (POL)
Julie Sabatié (FRA)	7–1	Amanda Tomczyk (POL)
Emanuela Liuzzi (ITA)	3–8	Anna Łukasiak (POL)
Mariya Stadnik (AZE)	8–0 Fall	Madison Parks (CAN)
Round 4
Jaslynn Gallegos (USA)	8–0 Fall	Gabija Dilytė (LTU)
Katie Dutchak (CAN)	10–0 Fall	Julie Sabatié (FRA)
Final III–V
Emanuela Liuzzi (ITA)	12–5	Jaslynn Gallegos (USA)
Katie Dutchak (CAN)	WO	Madison Parks (CAN)
Final I–II
Anna Łukasiak (POL)	0–7	Mariya Stadnik (AZE)

==== Women's freestyle 53 kg ====
	Score	
Round 1
Samantha Stewart (CAN)	4–7	Tetiana Profatilova (FRA)
SueAnne Harms (CAN)	0–10	Lucía Yépez (ECU)
Katarzyna Krawczyk (POL)	6–0 Fall	Laura Almaganbetova (KAZ)
Marissa Gallegos (USA)	10–0	Amory Andrich (GER)
Roksana Zasina (POL)	3–1	Anastasia Blayvas (GER)
Tatiana Debien (FRA)	0–6 Fall	Annika Wendle (GER)
Round 2
Samantha Stewart (CAN)	7–6	SueAnne Harms (CAN)
Laura Almaganbetova (KAZ)	6–4 Fall	Amory Andrich (GER)
Anastasia Blayvas (GER)	11–4	Tatiana Debien (FRA)
Tetiana Profatilova (FRA)	0–10	Lucía Yépez (ECU)
Katarzyna Krawczyk (POL)	8–1	Marissa Gallegos (USA)
Round 3
Samantha Stewart (CAN)	2–1 Fall	Laura Almaganbetova (KAZ)
Anastasia Blayvas (GER)	2–12	Tetiana Profatilova (FRA)
Lucía Yépez (ECU)	2–0 Fall	Katarzyna Krawczyk (POL)
Roksana Zasina (POL)	1–5	Annika Wendle (GER)
Round 4
Marissa Gallegos (USA)	3–5 Ret	Samantha Stewart (CAN)
Final III–V
Katarzyna Krawczyk (POL)	4–8 Fall	Tetiana Profatilova (FRA)
Samantha Stewart (CAN)	1–6	Roksana Zasina (POL)
Final I–II
Lucía Yépez (ECU)	4–0	Annika Wendle (GER)

==== Women's freestyle 55 kg ====
	Score	
Round 1
Erika Bognár (HUN)	0–2	Karla Godinez (CAN)
Laura Stanelytė (LTU)	2–11	Ainur Ashimova (KAZ)
Round 2
Erika Bognár (HUN)	11–0	Laura Stanelytė (LTU)
Karla Godinez (CAN)	7–2	Ainur Ashimova (KAZ)
Round 3
Erika Bognár (HUN)	11–2	Ainur Ashimova (KAZ)
Karla Godinez (CAN)	11–0	Laura Stanelytė (LTU)

==== Women's freestyle 57 kg ====
	Score	
Round 1
Céleste Sion (FRA)	0–5 Fall	Angelika Mytkowska (POL)
Nilufar Raimova (KAZ)	2–3	Amanda Martinez (USA)
Anna Michalcová (CZE)	5–3	Assylzat Sagymbay (KAZ)
Tamara Dollák (HUN)	0–2 Fall	Jowita Wrzesień (POL)
Emma Tissina (KAZ)	16–5	Zhala Aliyeva (AZE)
Ramóna Galambos (HUN)	1–2	Alexandra Hedrick (USA)
Patrycja Gil (POL)	8–8	Betzabeth Sarco (VEN)
Giullia Penalber (BRA)	4–0 Fall	Sandra Paruszewski (GER)
Elena Brugger (GER)	1–8	Magdalena Głodek (POL)
Anhelina Lysak (POL)	4–0 Fall	Alexandria Town (CAN)
Round 2
Céleste Sion (FRA)	1–8	Ramóna Galambos (HUN)
Nilufar Raimova (KAZ)	7–6 Fall	Betzabeth Sarco (VEN)
Assylzat Sagymbay (KAZ)	0–0 Ret	Sandra Paruszewski (GER)
Tamara Dollák (HUN)	4–14	Elena Brugger (GER)
Zhala Aliyeva (AZE)	2–12	Alexandria Town (CAN)
Naemi Leistner (GER)	4–8	Angelika Mytkowska (POL)
Alexandra Hedrick (USA)	3–2	Amanda Martinez (USA)
Patrycja Gil (POL)	4–0 Fall	Anna Michalcová (CZE)
Giullia Penalber (BRA)	3–1	Jowita Wrzesień (POL)
Magdalena Głodek (POL)	5–3	Emma Tissina (KAZ)
Round 3
Nilufar Raimova (KAZ)	4–9 Fall	Ramóna Galambos (HUN)
Sandra Paruszewski (GER)	5–3	Elena Brugger (GER)
Alexandria Town (CAN)	10–0	Naemi Leistner (GER)
Amanda Martinez (USA)	0–2 Fall	Anna Michalcová (CZE)
Jowita Wrzesień (POL)	10–0	Emma Tissina (KAZ)
Anhelina Lysak (POL)	10–0	Angelika Mytkowska (POL)
Alexandra Hedrick (USA)	3–4	Patrycja Gil (POL)
Round 4
Ramóna Galambos (HUN)	0–7	Sandra Paruszewski (GER)
Alexandria Town (CAN)	10–0	Anna Michalcová (CZE)
Jowita Wrzesień (POL)	9–0 Fall	Angelika Mytkowska (POL)
Anhelina Lysak (POL)	2–0 Fall	Patrycja Gil (POL)
Giullia Penalber (BRA)	7–0 Fall	Magdalena Głodek (POL)
Round 5
Alexandra Hedrick (USA)	3–3	Sandra Paruszewski (GER)
Alexandria Town (CAN)	12–12	Jowita Wrzesień (POL)
Final III–V
Patrycja Gil (POL)	2–3	Jowita Wrzesień (POL)
Alexandra Hedrick (USA)	4–6	Magdalena Głodek (POL)
Final I–II
Anhelina Lysak (POL)	3–5	Giullia Penalber (BRA)

==== Women's freestyle 59 kg ====
	Score	
Round 1
Oksana Moskalova (UKR)	5–7 Fall	Diana Kayumova (KAZ)
Wiktoria Karwowska (POL)	8–8	Luna Rothenberger (GER)
Nikolett Szabó (HUN)	12–8	Guldana Bekesh (KAZ)
Round 2
Oksana Moskalova (UKR)	8–0 Fall	Wiktoria Karwowska (POL)
Diana Kayumova (KAZ)	10–0	Luna Rothenberger (GER)
Mia Olivier (FRA)	2–6	Nikolett Szabó (HUN)
Round 3
Oksana Moskalova (UKR)	11–0 Fall	Luna Rothenberger (GER)
Diana Kayumova (KAZ)	10–0	Wiktoria Karwowska (POL)
Guldana Bekesh (KAZ)	6–2 Fall	Mia Olivier (FRA)
Final III–V
Diana Kayumova (KAZ)	10–0	Mia Olivier (FRA)
Guldana Bekesh (KAZ)	5–3 Fall	Luna Rothenberger (GER)
Final I–II
Oksana Moskalova (UKR)	2–3	Nikolett Szabó (HUN)

==== Women's freestyle 62 kg ====
	Score	
Round 1
Ana Godinez (CAN)	2–4	Laís Nunes (BRA)
Ella Doornaert (CAN)	2–2	Nicola Wasilewska (POL)
Iris Thiébaux (FRA)	1–1	Elis Manolova (AZE)
Natalia Kubaty (POL)	0–10	Grace Bullen (NOR)
Aleksandra Wólczyńska (POL)	0–10	Taybe Yusein (BUL)
Round 2
Ana Godinez (CAN)	10–0	Ella Doornaert (CAN)
Iris Thiébaux (FRA)	0–10	Natalia Kubaty (POL)
Luisa Niemesch (GER)	2–2	Laís Nunes (BRA)
Nicola Wasilewska (POL)	1–2	Elis Manolova (AZE)
Round 3
Aleksandra Wólczyńska (POL)	2–6	Ana Godinez (CAN)
Natalia Kubaty (POL)	0–11	Laís Nunes (BRA)
Luisa Niemesch (GER)	5–0	Elis Manolova (AZE)
Grace Bullen (NOR)	7–4	Taybe Yusein (BUL)
Round 4
Nicola Wasilewska (POL)	0–10 Fall	Ana Godinez (CAN)
Final III–V
Elis Manolova (AZE)	4–6	Laís Nunes (BRA)
Ana Godinez (CAN)	6–8 Fall	Taybe Yusein (BUL)
Final I–II
Luisa Niemesch (GER)	5–4	Grace Bullen (NOR)

==== Women's freestyle 65 kg ====
	Score	
Round 1
Gaukhar Mukatay (KAZ)	0–5 Fall	Yulia Leskovets (UKR)
Maya Letona (USA)	10–0	Gerda Barth (GER)
Ingrid Skard (NOR)	0–4 Fall	Irina Kazyulina (KAZ)
Iva Gerić (CRO)	1–4	Anne Nürnberger (GER)
Round 2
Gaukhar Mukatay (KAZ)	0–6 Fall	Gerda Barth (GER)
Ingrid Skard (NOR)	0–7 Fall	Iva Gerić (CRO)
Albina Kairgeldinova (KAZ)	0–8 Fall	Yulia Leskovets (UKR)
Round 3
Gerda Barth (GER)	6–6	Albina Kairgeldinova (KAZ)
Yulia Leskovets (UKR)	7–0 Fall	Maya Letona (USA)
Irina Kazyulina (KAZ)	2–2 Fall	Anne Nürnberger (GER)
Final III–V
Maya Letona (USA)	1–1	Iva Gerić (CRO)
Albina Kairgeldinova (KAZ)	0–4 Fall	Anne Nürnberger (GER)
Final I–II
Yulia Leskovets (UKR)	2–0 Fall	Irina Kazyulina (KAZ)

==== Women's freestyle 68 kg ====
	Score	
Round 1
Sofiya Georgieva (BUL)	0–9	Yuliana Yaneva (BUL)
Mimi Hristova (BUL)	12–1	Marilyn Garcia (USA)
Laura Godino (ITA)	4–3	Lilly Schneider (GER)
Lilly Pfau (GER)	0–4 Fall	Tayla Ford (NZL)
Adéla Hanzlíčková (CZE)	12–2	Paulina Danisz (POL)
Beibit Seidualy (KAZ)	0–10 Fall	Natalia Strzałka (POL)
Sophia Schäfle (GER)	0–10	Wiktoria Chołuj (POL)
Round 2
Sofiya Georgieva (BUL)	12–4	Marilyn Garcia (USA)
Lilly Schneider (GER)	10–0 Fall	Lilly Pfau (GER)
Paulina Danisz (POL)	0–8	Beibit Seidualy (KAZ)
Noémi Szabados (HUN)	0–10	Yuliana Yaneva (BUL)
Mimi Hristova (BUL)	11–0	Laura Godino (ITA)
Tayla Ford (NZL)	0–2 Fall	Adéla Hanzlíčková (CZE)
Natalia Strzałka (POL)	0–8	Wiktoria Chołuj (POL)
Round 3
Sophia Schäfle (GER)	1–6	Sofiya Georgieva (BUL)
Lilly Schneider (GER)	0–4 Fall	Beibit Seidualy (KAZ)
Noémi Szabados (HUN)	10–0	Laura Godino (ITA)
Tayla Ford (NZL)	0–4	Natalia Strzałka (POL)
Yuliana Yaneva (BUL)	3–5	Mimi Hristova (BUL)
Adéla Hanzlíčková (CZE)	2–5 Fall	Wiktoria Chołuj (POL)
Round 4
Sofiya Georgieva (BUL)	10–0	Beibit Seidualy (KAZ)
Noémi Szabados (HUN)	6–3 Fall	Natalia Strzałka (POL)
Final III–V
Yuliana Yaneva (BUL)	3–7	Wiktoria Chołuj (POL)
Sofiya Georgieva (BUL)	2–8	Noémi Szabados (HUN)
Final I–II
Mimi Hristova (BUL)	WO	Adéla Hanzlíčková (CZE)

==== Women's freestyle 72 kg ====
	Score	
Round 1
Faith Telford (CAN)	0–6	Anastassiya Panassovich (KAZ)
Patrycja Sperka (POL)	1–7	Olha Shchebetiuk (UKR)
Round 2
Kendra Dacher (FRA)	10–0	Faith Telford (CAN)
Anastassiya Panassovich (KAZ)	WO	Patrycja Sperka (POL)
Round 3
Olha Shchebetiuk (UKR)	4–0 Fall	Faith Telford (CAN)
Anastassiya Panassovich (KAZ)	0–8 Fall	Kendra Dacher (FRA)
Round 4
Patrycja Sperka (POL)	WO	Faith Telford (CAN)
Olha Shchebetiuk (UKR)	0–12	Kendra Dacher (FRA)
Round 5
Anastassiya Panassovich (KAZ)	3–1	Olha Shchebetiuk (UKR)
Patrycja Sperka (POL)	WO	Kendra Dacher (FRA)

==== Women's freestyle 76 kg ====
	Score	
Round 1
Linda Machuca (ARG)	5–0	Fanni Nađ (SRB)
Marion Bye (NOR)	2–9	Francy Rädelt (GER)
Yelena Makoyed (USA)	8–2	Cynthia Vescan (FRA)
Génesis Reasco (ECU)	11–0	Taylor Follensbee (CAN)
Kamilė Gaučaitė (LTU)	7–4 Fall	Inkara Zhanatayeva (KAZ)
Round 2
Fanni Nađ (SRB)	4–0 Fall	Marion Bye (NOR)
Cynthia Vescan (FRA)	WO	Taylor Follensbee (CAN)
Linda Machuca (ARG)	3–4	Francy Rädelt (GER)
Round 3
Inkara Zhanatayeva (KAZ)	2–0 Fall	Fanni Nađ (SRB)
Taylor Follensbee (CAN)	2–0 Fall	Linda Machuca (ARG)
Génesis Reasco (ECU)	9–0 Fall	Kamilė Gaučaitė (LTU)
Francy Rädelt (GER)	0–2 Fall	Yelena Makoyed (USA)
Final III–V
Francy Rädelt (GER)	4–0 Fall	Inkara Zhanatayeva (KAZ)
Taylor Follensbee (CAN)	4–0 Fall	Kamilė Gaučaitė (LTU)
Final I–II
Yelena Makoyed (USA)	5–7 Fall	Génesis Reasco (ECU)
