= Iman Mahdavi =

Iranian wrestler (born 1995)

Personal information
- Native name: ایمان مهدوی
- Born: 12 February 1995 (age 31) Iran
- Occupation: Freestyle wrestler

Iman Mahdavi (Persian: ایمان مهدوی; born 12 February 1995) is an Iranian freestyle wrestler who immigrated to Italy, and competed with the Refugee Olympic Team at the 2024 Summer Olympics.

== Early life ==
Iman Mahdavi was born on 12 February 1995, in Iran along the Caspian Sea. He grew up in the Mazandaran province. His father was a wrestler, which led to Mahdavi's involvement in the sport starting at the age of fifteen. Mahdavi became a seven-time national junior champion.

Mahdavi's father later died of a heart attack after being wrongly informed his son had died in a traffic collision.

In October 2020, Mahdavi left Iran due to ongoing concerns of its government's treatment of human rights by walking across its border with Turkey. Twenty days later, in November, Mahdavi flew to Milan, Italy, where he applied for asylum. He did not originally know his flight's destination, saying later in an interview, "Luckily for me, it was Italy."

== Career ==
After arriving in Italy, Mahdavi began training at the Lotta Club Seggiano gym in Pioltello, which was recommended to him by a friend he made on Instagram. His coach there, Marco "Papi" Moroni, also helped him start a job as a bouncer at a nightclub. The coaches at the gym quickly noticed Mahdavi's advanced technique and strength, which prompted them to train him for competitions.

Mahdavi has participated in the following competitions during his wrestling career:

Representing United World Wrestling
Year	Competition	Venue	Position	Event	Notes
2023	European Wrestling Championships	Zagreb, Croatia	12th	Men's freestyle 79 kg	
2023	City of Sassari Tournament	Sassari, Italy	3rd	Men's freestyle 79 kg	
2023	2023 Poland Open	Warsaw, Poland	5th	Men's freestyle 79 kg	The men's freestyle event is also known as the Wacław Ziółkowski Memorial.
2023	World Wrestling Championships	Belgrade, Serbia	18th	Men's freestyle 79 kg	
2024	European Wrestling Championships	Bucharest, Romania	12th	Men's freestyle 79 kg	
2024	2024 Summer Olympics	Paris, France	17th	Men's freestyle 74 kg	

Mahdavi plans to move to Moldova to intensify his training, and he aims to open a sports club to teach wrestling techniques to younger people.

=== 2024 Summer Olympics ===
On 2 May 2024, Mahdavi was announced as one of thirty-six athletes who would join the Refugee Olympic Team (EOR) in its participation at the 2024 Summer Olympics, particularly in the men's freestyle 74 kg event. He had the Olympic rings tattooed on his ribcage with the text "Paris 2024" below.

Refugee athletes like Mahdavi receive financial support to pay for training and participation in the Olympics from the Refugee Athletes Scholarship Program, which is managed by the Olympic Refuge Foundation and funded by the Olympic Solidarity Initiative. Most of the athletes on the EOR are selected from this program.
