= 2023 U23 World Wrestling Championships – Men's freestyle 79 kg =

Wrestling competitions

Men's freestyle 79 kg at the 2023 U23 World Championships
- Venue: Tirana Olympic Park
- Dates: 24–25 October
- Competitors: 22 from 19 nations

Medalists
gold medal	Magomed Magomaev	Authorised Neutral Athletes
silver medal	Ashraf Ashirov	Azerbaijan
bronze medal	Vladimeri Gamkrelidze	Georgia
bronze medal	Sagar Jaglan

The men's freestyle 79 kg is a competition featured at the 2023 U23 World Wrestling Championships, and was held in Tirana, Albania on 24 and 25 October 2023.

This freestyle wrestling competition consists of a single-elimination tournament, with a repechage used to determine the winner of two bronze medals. The two finalists face off for gold and silver medals. Each wrestler who loses to one of the two finalists moves into the repechage, culminating in a pair of bronze medal matches featuring the semifinal losers each facing the remaining repechage opponent from their half of the bracket.

== Results ==
Legend

- F — Won by fall

=== Final ===
Final
Magomed Magomaev (ANA)	9
Ashraf Ashirov (AZE)	4

=== Top half ===
Round of 32
Joona Vuoti (FIN)	11
José Sánchez (PUR)	0
Raffaele Matrullo (ITA)	4
Somonjon Ikromov (TJK)	1
Mateusz Pędzicki (POL)	0
Magomed Magomaev (ANA)	10

Round of 16
Mukhammad Abdullaev (KGZ)	3
Daniels Bendiks (LAT)	4
Joona Vuoti (FIN)	7
Dzmitry Dzenisenia (ANA)	8
Okan Tahtacı (TUR)	6^{F}
Raffaele Matrullo (ITA)	2
Magomed Magomaev (ANA)	8
Vladimeri Gamkrelidze (GEO)	5

Quarterfinals
Daniels Bendiks (LAT)	2
Dzmitry Dzenisenia (ANA)	6
Okan Tahtacı (TUR)	2
Magomed Magomaev (ANA)	3

Semifinals
Dzmitry Dzenisenia (ANA)	0
Magomed Magomaev (ANA)	10

=== Bottom half ===
Round of 32
Menua Yaribekyan (ARM)	0
Ashraf Ashirov (AZE)	7
Eugeniu Mihalcean (MDA)	12
Sagar Jaglan (UWW)	16
Masaki Sato (JPN)	4^{F}
Connor Church (CAN)	1

Round of 16
Gabriel Iglesias (ESP)	0
Ashraf Ashirov (AZE)	13
Sagar Jaglan (UWW)	10
Lucas Kahnt (GER)	0
Dustin Plott (USA)	2
Masaki Sato (JPN)	2
Shamsat Tair (KAZ)	5
Vladyslav Bodoriak (UKR)	5

Quarterfinals
Ashraf Ashirov (AZE)	10
Sagar Jaglan (UWW)	0
Masaki Sato (JPN)	3
Shamsat Tair (KAZ)	5

Semifinals
Ashraf Ashirov (AZE)	11
Shamsat Tair (KAZ)	0

=== Repechage ===
Repechage round 1
Mateusz Pędzicki (POL)	5
Vladimeri Gamkrelidze (GEO)	15
Menua Yaribekyan (ARM)	11
Gabriel Iglesias (ESP)	0

Repechage round 2
Vladimeri Gamkrelidze (GEO)	10
Okan Tahtacı (TUR)	0
Menua Yaribekyan (ARM)	13
Sagar Jaglan (UWW)	20^{F}

Bronze medals
Vladimeri Gamkrelidze (GEO)	10
Dzmitry Dzenisenia (ANA)	0
Sagar Jaglan (UWW)	12
Shamsat Tair (KAZ)	7
