= Akhmed Usmanov =

Russian freestyle wrestler

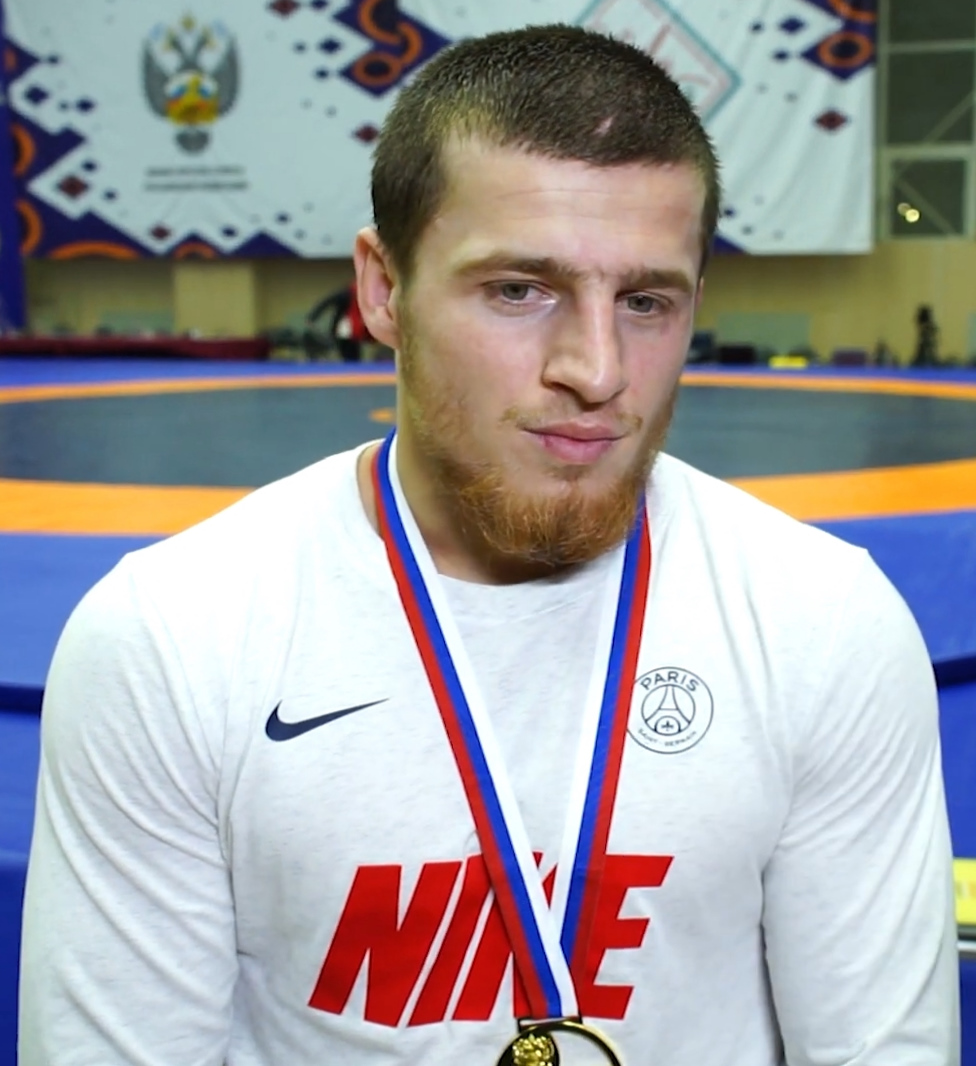
- Usmanov in 2020

Personal information
- Native name: Ахмед Магомедович Усманов
- Full name: Akhmed Magomedovich Usmanov
- Nationality: Russia
- Born: 16 September 1996 (age 29) Aknada, Kizilyurtovsky District, Dagestan, Russia
- Height: 174 cm (5 ft 9 in)

Sport
- Country: Russia
- Sport: Amateur wrestling
- Weight class: 79 kg
- Event: Freestyle
- Club: Shamil Umakhanov Wrestling Club (им. Шамиля Умаханова)

Achievements and titles
- World finals: (gold) (2023)
- Regional finals: (gold) (2024)
Medal record
Men's freestyle wrestling
Representing Individual Neutral Athletes
World Championships
Gold medal – first place	2023 Belgrade	79 kg
European Championships
Gold medal – first place	2024 Bucharest	79 kg
Representing UWW
European Championships
Gold medal – first place	2026 Tirana	79 kg
Gold medal – first place	2025 Bratislava	79 kg
Representing Russia
Individual World Cup
Gold medal – first place	2020 Belgrade	79 kg
World Juniors Championships
Silver medal – second place	2016 Macon	66 kg
Representing Dagestan
Russian National Championships
Gold medal – first place	2025 Moskow	79 kg
Gold medal – first place	2023 Kaspiysk	79 kg
Gold medal – first place	2020 Naro-Fominsk	79 kg
Silver medal – second place	2021 Ulan-Ude	79 kg
Golden Grand Prix Ivan Yarygin
Gold medal – first place	2026 Krasnoyarsk	79 kg
Gold medal – first place	2025 Krasnoyarsk	79 kg
Gold medal – first place	2023 Krasnoyarsk	79 kg
Gold medal – first place	2021 Krasnoyarsk	79 kg
Bronze medal – third place	2024 Krasnoyarsk	79 kg

Akhmed Magomedovich Usmanov (Russian: Ахмед Магомедович Усманов; born 16 September 1996) is a Russian freestyle wrestler. 2023 senior world and 2024 European champion.

In 2020, he won the gold medal in the men's 79 kg event at the 2020 Russian National Freestyle Wrestling Championships held in Naro-Fominsk, Moscow Oblast, Russia. In the same year, he won the gold medal in the men's 79 kg event at the 2020 Individual Wrestling World Cup held in Belgrade, Serbia.

He won the silver medal in his event at the 2021 Russian National Freestyle Wrestling Championships held in Ulan-Ude, Buryatia.

On September 17, 2023, he won the gold medal in the 79 kg weight category at the 2023 World Wrestling Championships in Belgrade. In the final bout he defeated Vladimeri Gamkrelidze from Georgia 4:1.

He won the gold medal in the men's 79 kg event at the 2024 European Wrestling Championships held in Bucharest, Romania. He defeated Mahamedkhabib Kadzimahamedau in his gold medal match.
