= Aknada =

Aknada Акнада
- Selo
- Location within Republic of Dagestan Location within Russia
- Coordinates: 43°22′N 46°54′E
- Country: Russia
- Region: Republic of Dagestan
- District: Kizilyurtovsky District
- Time zone: UTC+3:00

Aknada (Russian: Акнада) is a rural locality (a selo) in Kizilyurtovsky District, Republic of Dagestan, Russia. The population was 4,014 as of 2010. There are 42 streets.

== Geography ==
Aknada is located 33 km northeast of Kizilyurt (the district's administrative centre) by road. Pyatiletka and Chalo are the nearest rural localities.

== Nationalities ==
Avars live there.
