= 2023 Big Ten Wrestling Championships – 174 lbs =

174 pounds at the 2023 Big Ten Wrestling Championships
- Site: Crisler Center; Ann Arbor, Michigan
- Competitors: 14

Medalists
- 1st place, gold medalist(s): Carter Starocci (Penn State)
- 2nd place, silver medalist(s): Mikey Labriola (Nebraska)
- 3rd place, bronze medalist(s): Ethan Smith (Ohio State)

The 174-pound competition at the 2023 Big Ten Wrestling Championships in Ann Arbor, Michigan, took place from March 4–5, 2023 at the Crisler Center.

The competition consisted of a double-elimination tournament to determine the top eight wrestlers of the Big Ten's 174-pound weight class. The top seven wrestlers would qualify for the 2023 NCAA Division I Wrestling Championships.

== Preliminary seeds ==
The Big Ten announced the preliminary seeds on February 27, 2023.

Seed	Wrestler
1	Carter Starocci (Penn State)
2	Mikey Labriola (Nebraska)
3	Ethan Smith (Ohio State)
4	Bailee O'Reilly (Minnesota)
5	Edmond Ruth (Illinois)
6	Donnell Washington (Indiana)
7	Nelson Brands (Iowa)
8	Troy Fisher (Northwestern)
9	Max Maylor (Michigan)
10	Jackson Turley (Rutgers)
11	Caesar Garza (Michigan State)
12	Dominic Solis (Maryland)
13	Josh Otto (Wisconsin)
14	Cooper Noehre (Purdue)

== Results ==
Legend

- F — Won by fall
- MF — Won by medical forfeit

=== Championship bracket ===
First Round
1	Carter Starocci (PSU)
BYE
9	Max Maylor (MICH)	5
8	Troy Fisher (NU)	8
5	Edmond Ruth (ILL)	5
12	Dominic Solis (MD)	1
13	Josh Otto (WIS)	0
4	Bailee O'Reilly (MINN)	9
3	Ethan Smith (OSU)	11
14	Cooper Noehre (PUR)	6
11	Ceasar Garza (MSU)	0
6	Donnell Washington (IND)	8
7	Nelson Brands (IOWA)	1
10	Jackson Turley (RUT)	0
BYE
2	Mikey Labriola (NEB)

Quarterfinals
1	Carter Starocci (PSU)	10
8	Troy Fisher (NU)	2
5	Edmond Ruth (ILL)	2
4	Bailee O'Reilly (MINN)	4
3	Ethan Smith (OSU)	10
6	Donnell Washington (IND)	1
7	Nelson Brands (IOWA)	2
2	Mikey Labriola (NEB)	5

Semifinals
1	Carter Starocci (PSU)	8
4	Bailee O'Reilly (MINN)	2
3	Ethan Smith (OSU)	3
2	Mikey Labriola (NEB)	4

1st-Place Match
1	Carter Starocci (PSU)	6
2	Mikey Labriola (NEB)	1

=== Consolation bracket ===
Consolation Round 1
BYE
BYE

Consolation Round 2

Consolation Quarterfinals
7th-Place Match

Consolation Semifinals
5th-Place Match

3rd-Place Match

== Final standings ==
Note: Top-7 wrestlers qualify for the 2023 NCAA Division I Wrestling Championships.

Rank	Wrestler
1st place, gold medalist(s)	Carter Starocci (Penn State)
2nd place, silver medalist(s)	Mikey Labriola (Nebraska)
3rd place, bronze medalist(s)	Ethan Smith (Ohio State)
4	Bailee O'Reilly (Minnesota)
5	Nelson Brands (Iowa)
6	Edmond Ruth (Illinois)
7	Jackson Turley (Rutgers)
8	Donnell Washington (Indiana)
