= Ramazan Sarı =

Turkish freestyle wrestler

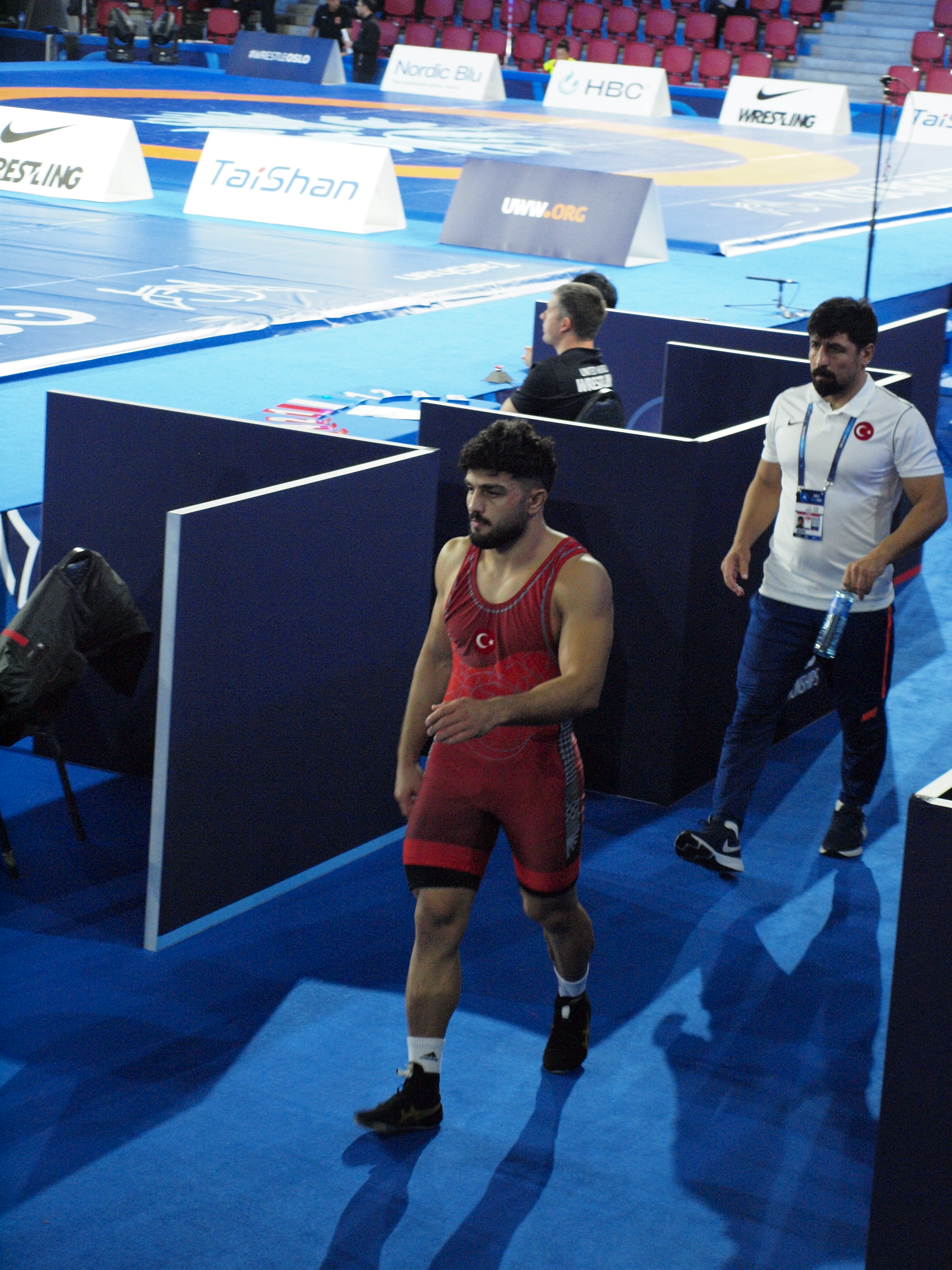

Personal information
- Full name: Ramazan İshak Sarı
- Born: January 1, 1998 (age 28) Kocaeli, Turkey
- Education: Burdur Mehmet Akif Ersoy University
- Height: 1.77 m (5 ft 10 in)
- Weight: 79 kg (174 lb; 12.4 st)

Sport
- Country: Turkey
- Sport: Amateur wrestling
- Event: Freestyle
- Club: Ankara Aski
Medal record
Men's freestyle wrestling
Representing Turkey
Yasar Dogu Tournament
Silver medal – second place	2025 Kocaeli	79 kg
Bronze medal – third place	2024 Antalya	79 kg
Bronze medal – third place	2026 Antalya	79 kg
Dan Kolov & Nikola Petrov Tournament
Bronze medal – third place	2023 Sofia	79 kg
World U23 Championships
Silver medal – second place	2021 Belgrade	79 kg
Bronze medal – third place	2019 Budapest	79 kg
European U23 Championship
Gold medal – first place	2021 Skopje	79 kg
Silver medal – second place	2019 Novi Sad	79 kg
European Juniors Championships
Gold medal – first place	2018 Rome	79 kg

Ramazan Sarı (born January 1, 1998) is a Turkish freestyle wrestler competing in the 79 kg division. He is a member of Ankara Aski.

== Career ==
In 2021, he won the gold medal in the men's 79 kg event at the 2021 European U23 Wrestling Championship held in Skopje, North Macedonia. He won the silver medal in the 79 kg event at the 2021 U23 World Wrestling Championships held in Belgrade, Serbia.

He lost his bronze medal match in the men's 79 kg event at the 2024 European Wrestling Championships held in Bucharest, Romania.
