= Vasyl Mykhailov =

Ukrainian freestyle wrestler

Personal information
- Native name: Василь Михайлов
- Nationality: Ukraine
- Born: Vasyl Mykhailov; 24 June 1995 (age 31) Tarutyne, Bolhrad Raion, Ukraine
- Height: 175 cm (5 ft 9 in)

Sport
- Country: Ukraine
- Sport: Amateur wrestling
- Weight class: 74–79 kg
- Event: Freestyle
- Club: sports school #14 (Odesa)

Achievements and titles
- World finals: (bronze) (2022) (bronze) (2023)
- Regional finals: (gold) (2023) (bronze) (2020)
Medal record
Men's freestyle wrestling
Representing Ukraine
World Championships
Bronze medal – third place	2022 Belgrade	79 kg
Bronze medal – third place	2023 Belgrade	79 kg
Individual World Cup
Bronze medal – third place	2020 Belgrade	79 kg
European Championships
Gold medal – first place	2023 Zagreb	79 kg
Bronze medal – third place	2020 Rome	79 kg
Dan Kolov & Nikola Petrov Tournament
Gold medal – first place	2026 Plovdiv	79 kg
Bronze medal – third place	2018 Sofia	74 kg
Grand Prix
Gold medal – first place	2023 Alexandria	86 kg
Gold medal – first place	2022 Rome	79 kg
Gold medal – first place	2022 Warsaw	79 kg
Bronze medal – third place	2021 Warsaw	79 kg
World U23 Championships
Bronze medal – third place	2017 Bydgoszcz	74 kg
European U23 Championships
Bronze medal – third place	2017 Szombathely	70 kg
World University Championships
Silver medal – second place	2016 Corum	70 kg
European Juniors Championships
Bronze medal – third place	2015 Istanbul	66 kg
World Cadet Championships
Silver medal – second place	2012 Baku	46 kg
European Cadet Championships
Gold medal – first place	2011 Warsaw	42 kg
Men's beach wrestling
World Beach Games
Bronze medal – third place	2019 Doha	80 kg
World Beach Championships
Silver medal – second place	2018 Sarigerme	80 kg

Vasyl Mykhailov (Ukrainian: Василь Михайлов, born 24 June 1995) is a Ukrainian freestyle wrestler. He won one of the bronze medals in the 79 kg event at the 2022 World Wrestling Championships held in Belgrade, Serbia. He also won one of the bronze medals in the 79 kg event at the 2020 European Wrestling Championships held in Rome, Italy. Mykhailov represented Ukraine at the 2020 Summer Olympics in Tokyo, Japan and 2024 Summer Olympics in Paris, France.

== Career ==
In 2016, Mykhailov won the silver medal in the men's 70 kg event at the World University Wrestling Championships held in Çorum, Turkey. A year later, he competed in the men's freestyle 74 kg event at the 2017 World Wrestling Championships held in Paris, France. In the same year, he won one of the bronze medals in the men's 74 kg event at the 2017 U23 World Wrestling Championships held in Bydgoszcz, Poland.

In 2019, Mykhailov represented Ukraine at the World Beach Games in Doha, Qatar and he won the bronze medal in the men's 80 kg beach wrestling event.

In 2020, Mykhailov won one of the bronze medals in the men's 79 kg event at the Individual Wrestling World Cup held in Belgrade, Serbia. In May 2021, he qualified at the World Olympic Qualification Tournament to represent Ukraine at the 2020 Summer Olympics in Tokyo, Japan. In June 2021, he won one of the bronze medals in the men's 79 kg event at the 2021 Waclaw Ziolkowski Memorial held in Warsaw, Poland.

Mykhailov competed in the men's 74 kg event at the 2020 Summer Olympics held in Tokyo, Japan.

In 2022, Mykhailov won the gold medal in his event at the Matteo Pellicone Ranking Series 2022 held in Rome, Italy. He won one of the bronze medals in the 79 kg event at the 2022 World Wrestling Championships held in Belgrade, Serbia.

Mykhailov lost his bronze medal match in the men's 86 kg event at the 2024 European Wrestling Championships held in Bucharest, Romania. He competed at the 2024 European Wrestling Olympic Qualification Tournament in Baku, Azerbaijan hoping to qualify for the 2024 Summer Olympics in Paris, France. He was eliminated in his third match and he did not qualify for the Olympics. Mykhailov also competed at the 2024 World Wrestling Olympic Qualification Tournament held in Istanbul, Turkey without qualifying for the Olympics. He was able to compete at the Olympics and he competed in the men's freestyle 86 kg event. He was eliminated in his first match by Myles Amine of San Marino.

== Achievements ==
Year	Tournament	Location	Result	Event
2020	European Championships	Rome, Italy	3rd	Freestyle 79 kg
2022	World Championships	Belgrade, Serbia	3rd	Freestyle 79 kg
2023	European Championships	Zagreb, Croatia	1st	Freestyle 79 kg
