= 2022 Grand Prix of Spain =

- Host city: Madrid, Spain
- Dates: July 08 - 10, 2022
- Stadium: La Fundi

Champions
- Freestyle: Germany
- Greco-Roman: Georgia
- Women: Canada

The 2022 Grand Prix of Spain is a wrestling event was held in Madrid, Spain between 8 and 10 July 2022.

== Medal table ==
Rank	Nation	Gold	Silver	Bronze	Total
1	Georgia	6	3	0	9
2	Poland	4	4	7	15
3	Spain	3	3	3	9
4	Canada	2	4	8	14
5	Germany	2	3	2	7
6	United States	2	2	5	9
7	France	2	1	0	3
8	Bulgaria	2	0	1	3
9	Estonia	1	2	0	3
9	Puerto Rico	1	2	0	3
11	Norway	1	1	1	3
12	Sweden	1	0	2	3
13	Austria	1	0	1	2
14	Hungary	1	0	0	1
15	Romania	0	2	1	3
16	Peru	0	1	0	1
16	Refugee Team	0	1	0	1
18	Israel	0	0	2	2
18	Lithuania	0	0	2	2
18	Moldova	0	0	2	2
21	Portugal	0	0	1	1
21	Slovakia	0	0	1	1
Totals (22 entries)		29	29	39	97

== Team ranking ==
Rank	Men's freestyle		Men's Greco-Roman		Women's freestyle	
Rank	Team	Points	Team	Points	Team	Points
1	Germany	152	Georgia	170	Canada	177
2	Spain	145	Spain	84	United States	151
3	Poland	125	Norway	60	Poland	132
4	Canada	91	Austria	50	Bulgaria	90
5	Puerto Rico	87	Lithuania	42	France	84
6	Romania	55	Estonia	29	Spain	81
7	Moldova	40	Hungary	25	Sweden	40
8	United Kingdom	35	UWW Refugee Team	20	United Kingdom	32
9	Estonia	25	Sweden	15	Slovakia	15
9	Estonia	25	Portugal	15	Slovakia	15
9	Estonia	25	Israel	15	Slovakia	15
10	Peru	20				
10	Austria	20				

== Medal overview ==
=== Men's freestyle ===
Event	Gold	Silver	Bronze
57 kg	Levan Metreveli; Spain	Darian Cruz; Puerto Rico	Darthe Capellan; Canada
57 kg	Levan Metreveli; Spain	Darian Cruz; Puerto Rico	Logan Sloan; Canada
61 kg	Viktor Lyzen; Germany	Ángel Tinoco; Peru	Agustín Sánchez; Spain
65 kg	Sebastian Rivera; Puerto Rico	Nikolai Okhlopkov; Romania	Lachlan McNeil; Canada
65 kg	Sebastian Rivera; Puerto Rico	Nikolai Okhlopkov; Romania	Krzysztof Bieńkowski; Poland
70 kg	Kevin Henkel; Germany	Shamil Ustaev; Germany	Emmanuel Olapade; Canada
74 kg	Mohammad Mottaghinia; Spain	Zurab Kapraev; Romania	Mitch Finesilver; Israel
74 kg	Mohammad Mottaghinia; Spain	Zurab Kapraev; Romania	Vasile Diacon; Moldova
79 kg	Erik Reinbok; Estonia	Aimar Andruse; Estonia	Iakub Shikhdzamalov; Romania
79 kg	Erik Reinbok; Estonia	Aimar Andruse; Estonia	Marcel Käppeler; Germany
86 kg	Taimuraz Friev; Spain	Ethan Ramos; Puerto Rico	Cezary Sadowski; Poland
86 kg	Taimuraz Friev; Spain	Ethan Ramos; Puerto Rico	Andrian Grosul; Moldova
92 kg	Radosław Marcinkiewicz; Poland	Johannes Mayer; Germany	Andrew Johnson; Canada
97 kg	Zbigniew Baranowski; Poland	Erik Thiele; Germany	Nishan Randhawa; Canada
97 kg	Zbigniew Baranowski; Poland	Erik Thiele; Germany	Radosław Baran; Poland
125 kg	Robert Baran; Poland	Kamil Kościółek; Poland	Gennadij Cudinovic; Germany

=== Men's Greco-Roman ===
Event	Gold	Silver	Bronze
55 kg	no competitors		
60 kg	Nugzari Tsurtsumia; Georgia	Aser Ebro; Spain	Daniel Bobillo; Spain
63 kg	Pridon Abuladze; Georgia	Aker Al-Obaidi; Refugee Team	Jonatan Jednell; Sweden
67 kg	Leri Abuladze; Georgia	Luka Ochigava; Georgia	Pedro Caldas; Portugal
72 kg	Ramaz Zoidze; Georgia	Marcos Sánchez-Silva; Spain	Vilius Savickas; Lithuania
77 kg	Iuri Lomadze; Georgia	Shmagi Bolkvadze; Georgia	Per-Anders Kure; Norway
82 kg	Exauce Mukubu; Norway	Gela Bolkvadze; Georgia	David Zhytomyrsky; Israel
87 kg	Dávid Losonczi; Hungary	Andreas Välis; Estonia	Michael Wagner; Austria
97 kg	Markus Ragginger; Austria	Marcus Worren; Norway	Mindaugas Venckaitis; Lithuania
130 kg	Zviadi Pataridze; Georgia	Juan Heredia; Spain	Not awarded as there were only 2 competitors.

=== Women's freestyle ===
Event	Gold	Silver	Bronze
50 kg	Erin Golston; United States	Emma Luttenauer; France	Emily Shilson; United States
50 kg	Erin Golston; United States	Emma Luttenauer; France	Anna Łukasiak; Poland
53 kg	Jonna Malmgren; Sweden	Karla Godinez; Canada	Felicity Taylor; United States
53 kg	Jonna Malmgren; Sweden	Karla Godinez; Canada	Katarzyna Krawczyk; Poland
55 kg	Diana Weicker; Canada	Alisha Howk; United States	Adriana Dorado-Marin; United States
57 kg	Anhelina Lysak; Poland	Magdalena Głodek; Poland	Patrycja Gil; Poland
57 kg	Anhelina Lysak; Poland	Magdalena Głodek; Poland	Evelina Nikolova; Bulgaria
59 kg	Laurence Beauregard; Canada	Jowita Wrzesień; Poland	Lexie Basham; United States
62 kg	Taybe Yusein; Bulgaria	Ana Godinez; Canada	Lydia Pérez; Spain
62 kg	Taybe Yusein; Bulgaria	Ana Godinez; Canada	Johanna Lindborg; Sweden
65 kg	Mimi Hristova; Bulgaria	Aleah Nickel; Canada	Reese Larramendy; United States
68 kg	Pauline Lecarpentier; France	Ana Luciano; United States	Linda Morais; Canada
68 kg	Pauline Lecarpentier; France	Ana Luciano; United States	Natalia Strzałka; Poland
72 kg	Kendra Dacher; France	Patrycja Sperka; Poland	Zsuzsanna Molnár; Slovakia
76 kg	Yelena Makoyed; United States	Justina Di Stasio; Canada	Taylor Follensbee; Canada

== Participating nations ==
207 wrestlers from 24 countries:

1. Austria (6)
2. Bulgaria (6)
3. Canada (28)
4. Spain (38) (Host)
5. Estonia (4)
6. France (7)
7. United Kingdom (14)
8. Georgia (10)
9. Germany (16)
10. Moldova (3)
11. Puerto Rico (7)
12. Romania (3)
13. Hungary (1)
14. Israel (2)
15. Peru (1)
16. Poland (27)
17. Portugal (1)
18. Slovakia (1)
19. Sweden (3)
20. Lithuania (5)
21. Norway (3)
22. Malta (3)
23. United States (22)
24. UWW Refugee Team (1)

== Results ==
Legend

- F — Won by fall
- R — Retired
- WO — Won by walkover

=== Men's freestyle ===
==== Men's freestyle 57 kg ====
Quarterfinals		Semifinals		Final
Darthe Capellan (CAN)	5
Levan Metreveli (ESP)	6	Levan Metreveli (ESP)	5
Niklas Stechele (GER)	10	Niklas Stechele (GER)	4
Kye Mills (CAN)	0			Levan Metreveli (ESP)	2
Gary Giordimaina (MLT)	0			Darian Cruz (PUR)	2
Darian Cruz (PUR)	10	Darian Cruz (PUR)	8^{F}
Logan Sloan (CAN)	8^{F}	Logan Sloan (CAN)	0
Harvey Ridings (GBR)	4

Bronze medals
Darthe Capellan (CAN)	WO
Niklas Stechele (GER)
Gary Giordimaina (MLT)	12
Logan Sloan (CAN)	10^{F}

==== Men's freestyle 61 kg ====
Pos	Athlete	Pld	W	L	CP	TP	GER	PER	ESP
1	Viktor Lyzen (GER)	2	2	0	7	15	—	4–3	11–0
2	Ángel Tinoco (PER)	2	1	1	5	14	1–3 VPO1	—	11–0
3	Agustín Sánchez (ESP)	2	0	2	0	0	0–4 VSU	0–4 VSU	—

Source: UWW

==== Men's freestyle 65 kg ====
Round of 16
Lachlan McNeil (CAN)	11
Ross Connelly (GBR)	0
George Ramm (GBR)	0
Nikolai Okhlopkov (ROU)	8
Alexander Semisorow (GER)	3
Krzysztof Bieńkowski (POL)	3

Quarterfinals
Moritz Langer (GER)	0
Lachlan McNeil (CAN)	10
Sebastian Rivera (PUR)	13
Leon Gerstenberger (GER)	4
Carlos Álvarez (ESP)	2
Nikolai Okhlopkov (ROU)	12
Krzysztof Bieńkowski (POL)	11
Adam Vella (MLT)	0

Semifinals
Lachlan McNeil (CAN)	2
Sebastian Rivera (PUR)	4
Nikolai Okhlopkov (ROU)	4
Krzysztof Bieńkowski (POL)	1

Final
Sebastian Rivera (PUR)	8
Nikolai Okhlopkov (ROU)	4

Repechage round 1
Leon Gerstenberger (GER)
Bye
George Ramm (GBR)	10
Carlos Álvarez (ESP)	4

Bronze medal match
Lachlan McNeil (CAN)	10
Leon Gerstenberger (GER)	0
Krzysztof Bieńkowski (POL)	6
George Ramm (GBR)	3

==== Men's freestyle 70 kg ====
Pos	Athlete	Pld	W	L	CP	TP	GER	CAN	GER	ESP
1	Kevin Henkel (GER)	3	3	0	12	31	—	11–1	10–0	10–0
2	Emmanuel Olapade (CAN)	3	2	1	7	23	1–4 VSU1	—	11–9	11–8
3	Simon Monz (GER)	3	1	2	5	19	0–4 VSU	1–3 VPO1	—	10–0
4	Pablo Díez (ESP)	3	0	3	1	8	0–4 VSU	1–3 VPO1	0–4 VSU	—

Source: UWW

Pos	Athlete	Pld	W	L	CP	TP	GER	ESP	MLT
1	Shamil Ustaev (GER)	2	2	0	8	20	—	10–0	10–0
2	Ramon Geršak-Pérez (ESP)	2	1	1	3	8	0–4 VSU	—	8–2
3	Nico Zarb (MLT)	2	0	2	1	2	0–4 VSU	1–3 VPO1	—

Source: UWW

Semifinals
Kevin Henkel (GER)	10
Ramon Geršak-Pérez (ESP)	0
Shamil Ustaev (GER)	11
Emmanuel Olapade (CAN)	0

Final
Kevin Henkel (GER)	7
Shamil Ustaev (GER)	3
Bronze medal
Ramon Geršak-Pérez (ESP)	0
Emmanuel Olapade (CAN)	12

==== Men's freestyle 74 kg ====
Round of 16
Wojciech Wysocki (POL)	0
Zurab Kapraev (ROU)	11
Szymon Wojtkowski (POL)	12
Daniel Petrov (ESP)	1
Charlie Bowling (GBR)	0
Mitch Finesilver (ISR)	10
Richard Schröder (GER)	10
Saúl Bello (ESP)	0
Vasile Diacon (MDA)	5
Kamil Rybicki (POL)	0
Lucas Kahnt (GER)	0
Mohammad Mottaghinia (ESP)	10
Francisco Guzman (PUR)	0
Jasmit Phulka (CAN)	10

Quarterfinals
Adrián Carrasco (ESP)	0
Zurab Kapraev (ROU)	10
Szymon Wojtkowski (POL)	0
Mitch Finesilver (ISR)	11
Richard Schröder (GER)	0
Vasile Diacon (MDA)	10
Mohammad Mottaghinia (ESP)	10
Jasmit Phulka (CAN)	0

Semifinals
Zurab Kapraev (ROU)	7
Mitch Finesilver (ISR)	6
Vasile Diacon (MDA)	0
Mohammad Mottaghinia (ESP)	11

Final
Zurab Kapraev (ROU)	2
Mohammad Mottaghinia (ESP)	5

Repechage round 1
Wojciech Wysocki (POL)	6
Adrián Carrasco (ESP)	0
Lucas Kahnt (GER)	1
Jasmit Phulka (CAN)	6

Bronze medals
Mitch Finesilver (ISR)	10
Wojciech Wysocki (POL)	0
Vasile Diacon (MDA)	7
Jasmit Phulka (CAN)	5

==== Men's freestyle 79 kg ====
Round of 16
Ernest Dorosz (POL)	1
Gabriel Iglesias (ESP)	12

Quarterfinals
Erik Reinbok (EST)	4
Gabriel Iglesias (ESP)	1
Simon Marchl (AUT)	4
Iakub Shikhdzamalov (ROU)	8
Aimar Andruse (EST)	11
Patryk Ciurzyński (POL)	0
Marcel Käppeler (GER)	4
Sam Barmish (CAN)	1

Semifinals
Erik Reinbok (EST)	9
Iakub Shikhdzamalov (ROU)	5
Aimar Andruse (EST)	10^{F}
Marcel Käppeler (GER)	4

Final
Erik Reinbok (EST)	3
Aimar Andruse (EST)	3

Repechage round 1
Gabriel Iglesias (ESP)
Bye
Patryk Ciurzyński (POL)
Bye

Bronze medals
Iakub Shikhdzamalov (ROU)	10
Gabriel Iglesias (ESP)	0
Marcel Käppeler (GER)	17
Patryk Ciurzyński (POL)	7

==== Men's freestyle 86 kg ====
Round of 16
Jaime García-Zozaya (ESP)	0
Ethan Ramos (PUR)	10

Quarterfinals
Filip Rogut (POL)	0
Ethan Ramos (PUR)	10
Cezary Sadowski (POL)	12
Syerus Eslami (GBR)	4
Taimuraz Friev (ESP)	5
Krzysztof Sadowik (POL)	0
Andrian Grosul (MDA)	2^{F}
Joshua Morodion (GER)	1

Semifinals
Ethan Ramos (PUR)	11
Cezary Sadowski (POL)	0
Taimuraz Friev (ESP)	3
Andrian Grosul (MDA)	2

Final
Ethan Ramos (PUR)	6
Taimuraz Friev (ESP)	7

Repechage round 1
Jaime García-Zozaya (ESP)	0
Filip Rogut (POL)	11
Krzysztof Sadowik (POL)
Bye

Bronze medals
Cezary Sadowski (POL)	8
Filip Rogut (POL)	0
Andrian Grosul (MDA)	4
Krzysztof Sadowik (POL)	2

==== Men's freestyle 92 kg ====
Pos	Athlete	Pld	W	L	CP	TP	GER	CAN	ESP
1	Johannes Mayer (GER)	2	2	0	8	21	—	10–0	11–0
2	Sarabnoor Lally (CAN)	2	1	1	4	10	0–4 VSU	—	10–0
3	Aimar Alzón (ESP)	2	0	2	0	0	0–4 VSU	0–4 VSU	—

Source: UWW

Pos	Athlete	Pld	W	L	CP	TP	POL	CAN	PUR
1	Radosław Marcinkiewicz (POL)	2	2	0	8	20	—	10–0	10–0
2	Andrew Johnson (CAN)	2	1	1	4	12	0–4 VSU	—	12–2
3	Diego González (PUR)	2	0	2	1	2	0–4 VSU	1–4 VSU1	—

Source: UWW

Semifinals
Johannes Mayer (GER)	3
Andrew Johnson (CAN)	0
Radosław Marcinkiewicz (POL)	10
Sarabnoor Lally (CAN)	0

Final
Johannes Mayer (GER)	2
Radosław Marcinkiewicz (POL)	5
Bronze medal
Andrew Johnson (CAN)	13
Sarabnoor Lally (CAN)	3

==== Men's freestyle 97 kg ====
Round of 16
Nishan Randhawa (CAN)	11
Ertuğrul Ağca (GER)	4
Cameron Nicol (GBR)	0
Radu Lefter (MDA)	10

Quarterfinals
Zbigniew Baranowski (POL)	10
Nishan Randhawa (CAN)	5
Michał Bielawski (POL)	8
Marcos Santos (PUR)	0
Erik Thiele (GER)	10
Radosław Baran (POL)	0
Radu Lefter (MDA)	8
Alejandro Cañada (ESP)	1

Semifinals
Zbigniew Baranowski (POL)	10
Michał Bielawski (POL)	0
Erik Thiele (GER)	10
Radu Lefter (MDA)	0

Final
Zbigniew Baranowski (POL)	3
Erik Thiele (GER)	3

Repechage round 1
Nishan Randhawa (CAN)
Bye
Radosław Baran (POL)
Bye

Bronze medals
Michał Bielawski (POL)	1
Nishan Randhawa (CAN)	11
Radu Lefter (MDA)	0
Radosław Baran (POL)	12

==== Men's freestyle 125 kg ====
Pos	Athlete	Pld	W	L	CP	TP	POL	GER	ESP	GBR
1	Kamil Kościółek (POL)	3	3	0	11	28	—	8–0	10–0	10–0
2	Gennadij Cudinovic (GER)	3	2	1	9	20	0–3 VPO	—	10–0	10–0 Fall
3	Carlos Acebrón (ESP)	3	1	2	3	12	0–4 VSU	0–4 VSU	—	12–9
4	Mandhir Kooner (GBR)	3	0	3	1	9	0–4 VSU	0–5 VFA	1–3 VPO1	—

Source: UWW

Pos	Athlete	Pld	W	L	CP	TP	POL	AUT	PUR
1	Robert Baran (POL)	2	2	0	8	21	—	11–0	10–0
2	Johannes Ludescher (AUT)	2	1	1	3	4	0–4 VSU	—	4–1
3	Charles Merrill (PUR)	2	0	2	1	1	0–4 VSU	1–3 VPO1	—

Source: UWW

Semifinals
Kamil Kościółek (POL)	8
Johannes Ludescher (AUT)	0
Robert Baran (POL)	11
Gennadij Cudinovic (GER)	0

Final
Kamil Kościółek (POL)	4
Robert Baran (POL)	6
Bronze medal
Johannes Ludescher (AUT)	2
Gennadij Cudinovic (GER)	5

=== Men's Greco-Roman ===
==== Men's Greco-Roman 60 kg ====
Pos	Athlete	Pld	W	L	CP	TP	GEO	ESP	ESP
1	Nugzari Tsurtsumia (GEO)	2	2	0	9	19	—	11–0	8–0 Fall
2	Aser Ebro (ESP)	2	1	1	3	4	0–4 VSU	—	4–3
3	Daniel Bobillo (ESP)	2	0	2	1	3	0–5 VFA	1–3 VPO1	—

Source: UWW

==== Men's Greco-Roman 63 kg ====
Pos	Athlete	Pld	W	L	CP	TP	GEO	UWWWRT	SWE	TUN
1	Pridon Abuladze (GEO)	3	3	0	12	13	—	5–3	8–0	WO
2	Aker Al-Obaidi (UWWWRT)	3	2	1	11	12	1–3 VPO1	—	9–0 Fall	WO
3	Jonatan Jednell (SWE)	3	1	2	5	0	0–4 VSU	0–5 VFA	—	WO
—	Andy Juan (ESP)	3	0	3	0	0	0–5 VFO	0–5 VFO	0–5 VFO	—

Source: UWW

==== Men's Greco-Roman 67 kg ====
Pos	Athlete	Pld	W	L	CP	TP	GEO	GEO	POR	LTU
1	Leri Abuladze (GEO)	3	3	0	12	28	—	10–2	8–0	10–1
2	Luka Ochigava (GEO)	3	2	1	9	23	1–4 VSU1	—	11–0	10–1
3	Pedro Caldas (POR)	3	1	2	4	14	0–4 VSU	0–4 VSU	—	14–3
4	Konstantinas Kešanidi (LTU)	3	0	3	3	5	1–4 VSU1	1–4 VSU1	1–4 VSU1	—

Source: UWW

==== Men's Greco-Roman 72 kg ====
Pos	Athlete	Pld	W	L	CP	TP	GEO	LTU	AUT	ESP
1	Ramaz Zoidze (GEO)	3	3	0	12	26	—	9–0	9–0	8–4
2	Eimantas Vilimas (LTU)	3	2	1	6	11	0–4 VSU	—	6–1	5–1
3	Stefan Steigl (AUT)	3	1	2	6	3	0–4 VSU	1–3 VPO1	—	2–1 Fall
4	Junior Benítez (ESP)	3	0	3	2	6	1–3 VPO1	1–3 VPO1	0–5 VFA	—

Source: UWW

Pos	Athlete	Pld	W	L	CP	TP	ESP	LTU	EST
1	Marcos Sánchez-Silva (ESP)	2	2	0	8	21	—	3–1	7–3
2	Vilius Savickas (LTU)	2	1	1	3	4	1–3 VPO1	—	7–4
3	Randel Uibo (EST)	2	0	2	1	1	1–3 VPO1	1–3 VPO1	—

Source: UWW

Semifinals
Ramaz Zoidze (GEO)	9
Vilius Savickas (LTU)	0
Marcos Sánchez-Silva (ESP)	2
Eimantas Vilimas (LTU)	0

Final
Ramaz Zoidze (GEO)	8
Marcos Sánchez-Silva (ESP)	0
Bronze medal
Vilius Savickas (LTU)	2
Eimantas Vilimas (LTU)	1

==== Men's Greco-Roman 77 kg ====
Pos	Athlete	Pld	W	L	CP	TP	GEO	GEO	NOR	ESP	GEO
1	Iuri Lomadze (GEO)	4	4	0	17	24	—	WO	4–0 Fall	13–0	7–3
2	Shmagi Bolkvadze (GEO)	4	3	1	13	9	0–5 VIN	—	4–2	5–0 Fall	WO
3	Per-Anders Kure (NOR)	4	2	2	10	11	0–5 VFA	1–3 VPO1	—	9–0	WO
4	José Miguel Estévez (ESP)	4	1	3	5	0	0–4 VSU	0–5 VFA	0–4 VSU	—	WO
5	Beka Mamukashvili (GEO)	4	0	4	1	3	1–3 VPO1	0–5 VIN	0–5 VIN	0–5 VIN	—

Source: UWW

==== Men's Greco-Roman 82 kg ====
Pos	Athlete	Pld	W	L	CP	TP	NOR	GEO	ISR
1	Exauce Mukubu (NOR)	2	2	0	6	9	—	4–0	5–0
2	Gela Bolkvadze (GEO)	2	1	1	4	9	0–3 VPO	—	9–0
3	David Zhytomyrsky (ISR)	2	0	2	0	0	0–3 VPO	0–4 VSU	—

Source: UWW

==== Men's Greco-Roman 87 kg ====
Pos	Athlete	Pld	W	L	CP	TP	HUN	ESP	ESP
1	Dávid Losonczi (HUN)	2	2	0	8	22	—	11–0	11–0
2	Guillermo Gasca (ESP)	2	1	1	5	6	0–4 VSU	—	6–6 Fall
3	Daniel Herrero (ESP)	2	0	2	0	6	0–4 VSU	0–5 VFA	—

Source: UWW

Pos	Athlete	Pld	W	L	CP	TP	EST	AUT	ESP
1	Andreas Välis (EST)	2	2	0	7	14	—	2–1	12–4
2	Michael Wagner (AUT)	2	1	1	4	15	1–3 VPO1	—	14–5
3	Iván Álvarez (ESP)	2	0	2	2	9	1–4 VSU1	1–4 VSU1	—

Source: UWW

Semifinals
Dávid Losonczi (HUN)	WO
Michael Wagner (AUT)
Andreas Välis (EST)	8
Guillermo Gasca (ESP)	0

Final
Dávid Losonczi (HUN)	11
Andreas Välis (EST)	0
Bronze medal
Michael Wagner (AUT)	8
Guillermo Gasca (ESP)	0

==== Men's Greco-Roman 97 kg ====
Pos	Athlete	Pld	W	L	CP	TP	AUT	NOR	LTU	LTU
1	Markus Ragginger (AUT)	3	3	0	10	16	—	3–0	4–0	9–0
2	Marcus Worren (NOR)	3	2	1	6	8	0–3 VPO	—	5–3	3–2
3	Mindaugas Venckaitis (LTU)	3	1	2	4	6	0–3 VPO	1–3 VPO1	—	3–3
4	Amoldas Baranovas (LTU)	3	0	3	2	5	0–4 VSU	1–3 VPO1	1–3 VPO1	—

Source: UWW

==== Men's Greco-Roman 130 kg ====
Pos	Athlete	Pld	W	L	CP	TP	GEO	ESP
1	Zviadi Pataridze (GEO)	1	1	0	4	8	—	8–0
2	Juan Heredia (ESP)	1	0	1	0	0	0–4 VSU	—

Source: UWW

=== Women's freestyle ===
==== Women's freestyle 50 kg ====
Round of 16
Emma Luttenauer (FRA)	10
Alexia Seal (CAN)	0
Aintzane Gorría (ESP)	3
Amanda Tomczyk (POL)	7
Augusta Eve (CAN)	0
Emily Shilson (USA)	10
Anna Łukasiak (POL)	12
Katie Dutchak (CAN)	0
Erin Golston (USA)	8
Miglena Selishka (BUL)	6

Quarterfinals
Weronika Sikora (POL)	1
Emma Luttenauer (FRA)	11
Amanda Tomczyk (POL)	0
Emily Shilson (USA)	4
Julie Sabatié (FRA)	0
Anna Łukasiak (POL)	4
Erin Golston (USA)	10^{F}
Nyla Valencia (USA)	0

Semifinals
Emma Luttenauer (FRA)	12
Emily Shilson (USA)	10
Anna Łukasiak (POL)	2
Erin Golston (USA)	3

Final
Emma Luttenauer (FRA)	0
Erin Golston (USA)	10^{F}

Repechage round 1
Alexia Seal (CAN)	10
Weronika Sikora (POL)	3
Miglena Selishka (BUL)	6
Nyla Valencia (USA)	6

Bronze medals
Emily Shilson (USA)	12
Alexia Seal (CAN)	4
Anna Łukasiak (POL)	6
Nyla Valencia (USA)	0

==== Women's freestyle 53 kg ====
Round of 16
Joséphine Haemmerle (FRA)	4
Felicity Taylor (USA)	14^{F}
Jade Dufour (CAN)	0
Jonna Malmgren (SWE)	6^{F}
Tiare Ikei (USA)	11
Samantha Stewart (CAN)	0

Quarterfinals
Grace Lew (CAN)	0
Felicity Taylor (USA)	10
Karla Godinez (CAN)	14
Katie Gomez (USA)	4
Christelle Letchidjio (GBR)	0
Jonna Malmgren (SWE)	8^{F}
Tiare Ikei (USA)	1
Katarzyna Krawczyk (POL)	12

Semifinals
Felicity Taylor (USA)	0
Karla Godinez (CAN)	7
Jonna Malmgren (SWE)	5
Katarzyna Krawczyk (POL)	2

Final
Karla Godinez (CAN)	6
Jonna Malmgren (SWE)	6

Repechage round 1
Katie Gomez (USA)
Bye
Jade Dufour (CAN)	9
Christelle Letchidjio (GBR)	8

Bronze medals
Felicity Taylor (USA)	8
Katie Gomez (USA)	7
Katarzyna Krawczyk (POL)	14
Jade Dufour (CAN)	7

==== Women's freestyle 55 kg ====
Pos	Athlete	Pld	W	L	CP	TP	USA	POL	ESP
1	Adriana Dorado-Marin (USA)	2	2	0	6	22	—	12–4	10–8
2	Dominika Kulwicka (POL)	2	1	1	4	6	1–3 VPO1	—	2–1
3	Marina Rueda (ESP)	2	0	2	2	9	1–3 VPO1	1–3 VPO1	—

Source: UWW

Pos	Athlete	Pld	W	L	CP	TP	CAN	USA	USA
1	Diana Weicker (CAN)	2	2	0	8	24	—	11–0	13–2
2	Alisha Howk (USA)	2	1	1	3	6	0–4 VSU	—	6–2
3	Lauren Mason (USA)	2	0	2	2	4	1–4 VSU1	1–3 VPO1	—

Source: UWW

Semifinals
Adriana Dorado-Marin (USA)	0
Alisha Howk (USA)	8^{F}
Diana Weicker (CAN)	4^{F}
Dominika Kulwicka (POL)	0

Final
Alisha Howk (USA)	0
Diana Weicker (CAN)	10
Bronze medal
Adriana Dorado-Marin (USA)	11^{F}
Dominika Kulwicka (POL)	2

==== Women's freestyle 57 kg ====
Round of 16
Victoria Báez (ESP)	0
Magdalena Głodek (POL)	6
Kirti Saxena (CAN)	0
Patrycja Gil (POL)	4^{F}
Evelina Nikolova (BUL)	8^{F}
Sofia Macaluso (USA)	0
Graciela Sánchez (ESP)	0
Anhelina Lysak (POL)	4^{F}

Quarterfinals
Amanda Martinez (USA)	1
Magdalena Głodek (POL)	4
Patrycja Gil (POL)	4^{F}
Gaëlle Ruiz (FRA)	0
Nichole Moore (USA)	0
Evelina Nikolova (BUL)	10
Anhelina Lysak (POL)	6^{F}
Hannah Taylor (CAN)	0

Semifinals
Magdalena Głodek (POL)	4
Patrycja Gil (POL)	3
Evelina Nikolova (BUL)	0
Anhelina Lysak (POL)	4^{F}

Final
Magdalena Głodek (POL)	0
Anhelina Lysak (POL)	4^{F}

Repechage round 1
Victoria Báez (ESP)	3
Amanda Martinez (USA)	1
Graciela Sánchez (ESP)	2
Hannah Taylor (CAN)	4

Bronze medals
Patrycja Gil (POL)	10
Victoria Báez (ESP)	1
Evelina Nikolova (BUL)	6^{F}
Hannah Taylor (CAN)	0

==== Women's freestyle 59 kg ====
Pos	Athlete	Pld	W	L	CP	TP	CAN	POL	USA	USA	ESP
1	Laurence Beauregard (CAN)	4	4	0	15	38	—	6–5	10–0	10–0	12–0
2	Jowita Wrzesień (POL)	4	3	1	13	35	1–3 VPO1	—	10–0	10–0	10–0
3	Lexie Basham (USA)	4	2	2	7	17	0–4 VSU	0–4 VSU	—	6–1	11–0
4	Savannah Cosme (USA)	4	1	3	5	11	0–4 VSU	0–4 VSU	1–3 VPO1	—	10–0
5	Miren Huarte (ESP)	4	0	4	0	0	0–4 VSU	0–4 VSU	0–4 VSU	0–4 VSU	—

Source: UWW

==== Women's freestyle 62 kg ====
Quarterfinals		Semifinals		Final
Alexandria Liles (USA)	0
Ana Godinez (CAN)	11	Ana Godinez (CAN)	4^{F}
Améline Douarre (FRA)	1	Lydia Pérez (ESP)	0
Lydia Pérez (ESP)	4			Ana Godinez (CAN)	0
Abbie Fountain (GBR)	0			Taybe Yusein (BUL)	10
Paulina Danisz (POL)	2^{F}	Paulina Danisz (POL)	0
Taybe Yusein (BUL)	5^{F}	Taybe Yusein (BUL)	10
Johanna Lindborg (SWE)	0

Bronze medals
Alexandria Liles (USA)	6
Lydia Pérez (ESP)	6^{F}
Johanna Lindborg (SWE)	3^{F}
Paulina Danisz (POL)	0

==== Women's freestyle 65 kg ====
Pos	Athlete	Pld	W	L	CP	TP	BUL	CAN	ESP	USA
1	Mimi Hristova (BUL)	3	3	0	12	34	—	14–4	10–0	10–0
2	Aleah Nickel (CAN)	3	1	2	7	14	1–4 VSU1	—	3–4	7–4 Fall
3	Nerea Pampín (ESP)	3	1	2	4	15	0–4 VSU	3–1 VPO1	—	11–16
4	Chloe Ogden (USA)	3	1	2	3	20	0–4 VSU	0–5 VFA	3–1 VPO1	—

Source: UWW

Pos	Athlete	Pld	W	L	CP	TP	USA	CAN	ESP
1	Reese Larramendy (USA)	2	2	0	8	10	—	10–2	WO
2	Amanda Savard (CAN)	2	1	1	6	2	1–3 VPO1	—	WO
3	Marina Velázquez (ESP)	2	0	2	0	0	0–5 VIN	0–5 VIN	—

Source: UWW

Semifinals
Mimi Hristova (BUL)	4^{F}
Amanda Savard (CAN)	0
Reese Larramendy (USA)	2
Aleah Nickel (CAN)	4^{F}

Final
Mimi Hristova (BUL)	10
Aleah Nickel (CAN)	0
Bronze medal
Amanda Savard (CAN)	2
Reese Larramendy (USA)	9

==== Women's freestyle 68 kg ====
Round of 16
Linda Morais (CAN)	6^{F}
Chloe Spiteri (GBR)	0
Natalia Strzałka (POL)	10
Marta Ojeda (ESP)	0

Quarterfinals
Destiny Rodriguez (USA)	0
Linda Morais (CAN)	10
Sienna Ramirez (USA)	3
Pauline Lecarpentier (FRA)	4
Sarah Clossick (GBR)	0
Ana Luciano (USA)	10
Natalia Strzałka (POL)	1
Sofiya Georgieva (BUL)	1

Semifinals
Linda Morais (CAN)	2
Pauline Lecarpentier (FRA)	3
Ana Luciano (USA)	12
Natalia Strzałka (POL)	9

Final
Pauline Lecarpentier (FRA)	10
Ana Luciano (USA)	2

Repechage round 1
Sienna Ramirez (USA)
Bye
Sarah Clossick (GBR)
Bye

Bronze medals
Linda Morais (CAN)	10
Sienna Ramirez (USA)	0
Natalia Strzałka (POL)	10
Sarah Clossick (GBR)	0

==== Women's freestyle 72 kg ====
Pos	Athlete	Pld	W	L	CP	TP	POL	CAN	ESP
1	Patrycja Sperka (POL)	2	2	0	8	15	—	6–6	9–0 Fall
2	Shauna Kuebeck (CAN)	2	1	1	6	10	1–3 VPO1	—	4–0 Fall
3	Itziar Rekalde (ESP)	2	0	2	0	0	0–5 VFA	0–5 VFA	—

Source: UWW

Pos	Athlete	Pld	W	L	CP	TP	FRA	SVK	ESP
1	Kendra Dacher (FRA)	2	2	0	7	15	—	5–0	10–0
2	Zsuzsanna Molnár (SVK)	2	1	1	3	2	0–3 VPO	—	2–1
3	Lorena Lera (ESP)	2	0	2	1	1	0–4 VSU	1–3 VPO1	—

Source: UWW

Semifinals
Patrycja Sperka (POL)	3^{F}
Zsuzsanna Molnár (SVK)	2
Kendra Dacher (FRA)	10
Shauna Kuebeck (CAN)	0

Final
Patrycja Sperka (POL)	0
Kendra Dacher (FRA)	10
Bronze medal
Zsuzsanna Molnár (SVK)	8
Shauna Kuebeck (CAN)	7

==== Women's freestyle 76 kg ====
Pos	Athlete	Pld	W	L	CP	TP	USA	CAN	ESP	BUL
1	Yelena Makoyed (USA)	3	3	0	14	20	—	2–2 Fall	4–0 Fall	14–4
2	Taylor Follensbee (CAN)	3	2	1	10	12	0–5 VFA	—	10–0 Fall	WO
3	Carla Lera (ESP)	3	1	2	5	0	0–5 VFA	0–5 VFA	—	WO
4	Maria Oryashkova (BUL)	3	0	3	1	4	1–4 VSU1	0–5 VIN	0–5 VIN	—

Source: UWW

Pos	Athlete	Pld	W	L	CP	TP	CAN	USA	GBR
1	Justina Di Stasio (CAN)	2	2	0	8	14	—	8–1	6–0 Fall
2	Tristan Kelly (USA)	2	1	1	4	4	1–3 VPO1	—	3–2
3	Georgina Nelthorpe (GBR)	2	0	2	1	2	0–5 VFA	1–3 VPO1	—

Source: UWW

Semifinals
Yelena Makoyed (USA)	4^{F}
Tristan Kelly (USA)	0
Justina Di Stasio (CAN)	10
Taylor Follensbee (CAN)	0

Final
Yelena Makoyed (USA)	6^{F}
Justina Di Stasio (CAN)	0
Bronze medal
Tristan Kelly (USA)	1
Taylor Follensbee (CAN)	10^{F}
