= 2023 Grand Prix of Spain =

- Host city: Madrid, Spain
- Dates: 7–9 July 2023
- Stadium: Consejo Superior de Deportes

Champions
- Freestyle: Kazakhstan
- Greco-Roman: Spain
- Women: United States

The 2023 Grand Prix of Spain is a wrestling event held in Madrid, Spain between 7 and 9 July 2023.

== Event videos ==
The event will air on the Scorizer Youtube channel.

Broadcasting
7 July 2023 Mat 1	7 July 2023 Mat 2	7 July 2023 Mat 3
8 July 2023 Mat 1	8 July 2023 Mat 2	8 July 2023 Mat 3
8 July 2023 Mat 1 F	8 July 2023 Mat 2 F	8 July 2023 Mat 3 F
9 July 2023 Mat 1	9 July 2023 Mat 2	9 July 2023 Mat 3
9 July 2023 Mat 1 F	9 July 2023 Mat 2 F	9 July 2023 Mat 3 F

== Medal table ==
* Host nation (Spain)

Rank	Nation	Gold	Silver	Bronze	Total
1	Kazakhstan	6	8	9	23
2	United States	4	5	8	17
3	South Korea	4	4	4	12
4	Colombia	2	5	0	7
5	Canada	2	2	4	8
6	Spain*	2	1	9	12
7	Finland	2	1	1	4
8	Nigeria	2	0	1	3
9	Switzerland	1	0	3	4
10	Germany	1	0	2	3
11	North Macedonia	1	0	1	2
12	Bulgaria	1	0	0	1
12	Chinese Taipei	1	0	0	1
12	Serbia	1	0	0	1
15	Ecuador	0	2	0	2
16	Belgium	0	1	0	1
16	Greece	0	1	0	1
18	Poland	0	0	2	2
19	Peru	0	0	1	1
Totals (19 entries)		30	30	45	105

== Team ranking ==
Rank	Men's freestyle		Men's Greco-Roman		Women's freestyle	
Rank	Team	Points	Team	Points	Team	Points
1	Kazakhstan	178	Spain	142	United States	190
2	South Korea	107	Kazakhstan	135	Canada	125
3	Canada	104	Colombia	82	Colombia	86
4	Spain	91	Finland	70	Spain	71
5	Germany	63	South Korea	65	Nigeria	65
6	Switzerland	55	Switzerland	37	South Korea	59
7	Poland	46	United States	37	Chinese Taipei	35
8	Colombia	41	Peru	15	Ecuador	30
9	North Macedonia	35	Chinese Taipei	10	Poland	29
10	Finland	33	Norway	8	Bulgaria	25

== Medal overview ==
=== Men's freestyle ===
Event	Gold	Silver	Bronze
57 kg	Kim Sung-gwon; South Korea	Cho Hyeon-su; South Korea	Zangar Kabylbekov; Kazakhstan
57 kg	Kim Sung-gwon; South Korea	Cho Hyeon-su; South Korea	Thomas Epp; Switzerland
61 kg	Stevan Mićić; Serbia	Talap Zholdasov; Kazakhstan	Nils Leutert; Switzerland
61 kg	Stevan Mićić; Serbia	Talap Zholdasov; Kazakhstan	Ramzan Awtaew; Germany
65 kg	Lachlan McNeil; Canada	Ayub Musaev; Belgium	Bekzat Yermekbay; Kazakhstan
65 kg	Lachlan McNeil; Canada	Ayub Musaev; Belgium	Carlos Álvarez; Spain
70 kg	Kuanysh Duisenkul; Kazakhstan	Kurmanbek Kaipanov; Kazakhstan	Rodion Anchugin; Kazakhstan
70 kg	Kuanysh Duisenkul; Kazakhstan	Kurmanbek Kaipanov; Kazakhstan	Marc Dietsche; Switzerland
74 kg	Alibek Abdikassymov; Kazakhstan	Kanat Mussabekov; Kazakhstan	Zhengis Kanybekov; Kazakhstan
74 kg	Alibek Abdikassymov; Kazakhstan	Kanat Mussabekov; Kazakhstan	Kamil Rybicki; Poland
79 kg	Ahmad Magomedov; North Macedonia	Nurzhigit Mustafa; Kazakhstan	Shamsat Tair; Kazakhstan
79 kg	Ahmad Magomedov; North Macedonia	Nurzhigit Mustafa; Kazakhstan	Joona Vuoti; Finland
86 kg	Taimuraz Friev; Spain	Kim Gwan-uk; South Korea	Cezary Sadowski; Poland
86 kg	Taimuraz Friev; Spain	Kim Gwan-uk; South Korea	Alex Moore; Canada
92 kg	Rahmatullah Moradi; Germany	Serzhan Yeleussin; Kazakhstan	Bekzat Amangali; Kazakhstan
97 kg	Seo Ju-hwan; South Korea	Akezhan Aitbekov; Kazakhstan	Nishan Randhawa; Canada
97 kg	Seo Ju-hwan; South Korea	Akezhan Aitbekov; Kazakhstan	Ertuğrul Ağca; Germany
125 kg	Jung Yei-hyun; South Korea	Jhoan Ocoro; Colombia	Carlos Acebrón; Spain

=== Men's Greco-Roman ===
Event	Gold	Silver	Bronze
55 kg	Meirambek Bekarys; Kazakhstan	Armiya Kuat; Kazakhstan	James Castaño; Spain
60 kg	Bakytzhan Kabdyl; Kazakhstan	Kim Dahyun; South Korea	Son Hee-dong; South Korea
60 kg	Bakytzhan Kabdyl; Kazakhstan	Kim Dahyun; South Korea	Olzhas Sultan; Kazakhstan
63 kg	Jeong Yeong-woo; South Korea	Iliyas Dauitov; Kazakhstan	Kanat Akytbek; Kazakhstan
67 kg	Almatbek Amanbek; Kazakhstan	Andrés Montaño; Ecuador	Nilton Soto; Peru
72 kg	Michael Portmann; Switzerland	Joni Komppa; Finland	Temirlan Mamytbek; Kazakhstan
77 kg	Marcos Sánchez-Silva; Spain	Hanner Ramírez; Colombia	Yuisralembert Carrión; Spain
82 kg	Damir Tursunov; Kazakhstan	Mohamed Amin Mainich; Spain	Andrés González; Spain
87 kg	Waltteri Latvala; Finland	Juan José González; Colombia	Daniel Herrero; Spain
97 kg	Arvi Savolainen; Finland	Kwon Jeong-yul; South Korea	José Ferrándiz; Spain
130 kg	Courtney Freeman; United States	Óscar Loango; Colombia	Gerónimo Cámara; Spain

=== Women's freestyle ===
Event	Gold	Silver	Bronze
50 kg	Mercy Genesis; Nigeria	Jacqueline Mollocana; Ecuador	Veronika Ryabovolova; North Macedonia
50 kg	Mercy Genesis; Nigeria	Jacqueline Mollocana; Ecuador	Audrey Jimenez; United States
53 kg	Katie Gomez; United States	Maria Prevolaraki; Greece	Alisha Howk; United States
53 kg	Katie Gomez; United States	Maria Prevolaraki; Greece	Amani Jones; United States
55 kg	Carolina Castillo; Colombia	Montana DeLawder; United States	Sofia Macaluso; United States
57 kg	Evelina Nikolova; Bulgaria	Mia Friesen; Canada	Tianna Kennett; Canada
57 kg	Evelina Nikolova; Bulgaria	Mia Friesen; Canada	Kwon Young-jin; South Korea
59 kg	Hannah Taylor; Canada	Xochitl Mota-Pettis; United States	Alexis Janiak; United States
62 kg	Esther Kolawole; Nigeria	Ashlynn Ortega; Canada	Miki Rowbottom; Canada
62 kg	Esther Kolawole; Nigeria	Ashlynn Ortega; Canada	Lydia Pérez; Spain
65 kg	Valentina Andradres; Colombia	Skylar Hattendorf; United States	Madeline Kubicki; United States
68 kg	Bella Mir; United States	Olivia Di Bacco; Canada	Blessing Oborududu; Nigeria
68 kg	Bella Mir; United States	Olivia Di Bacco; Canada	Park Hyeon-yeong; South Korea
72 kg	Kaylynn Albrecht; United States	María Ceballos; Colombia	Rose Cassioppi; United States
76 kg	Chang Hui-tsz; Chinese Taipei	Ashley Lekas; United States	Jeong Seo-yeon; South Korea
76 kg	Chang Hui-tsz; Chinese Taipei	Ashley Lekas; United States	Brianna Fraser; Canada

== Participating nations ==
251 wrestlers from 29 countries:

1. Bulgaria (1)
2. Greece (1)
3. Germany (7)
4. Spain (47) (Host)
5. Switzerland (11)
6. Italy (3)
7. Colombia (17)
8. United States (20)
9. France (4)
10. South Korea (20)
11. Nigeria (3)
12. Israel (1)
13. New Zealand (2)
14. United Kingdom (1)
15. Guinea-Bissau (1)
16. Serbia (2)
17. Estonia (2)
18. Lithuania (2)
19. Norway (2)
20. Ecuador (3)
21. Peru (4)
22. Finland (6)
23. Poland (13)
24. Kazakhstan (35)
25. Canada (32)
26. North Macedonia (3)
27. Belgium (2)
28. South Africa (1)
29. Chinese Taipei (5)

== Results ==
Legend

- F — Won by fall
- WO — Won by walkover

=== Men's freestyle ===
==== Men's freestyle 57 kg ====
Round of 16
Kim Sung-gwon (KOR)	3
Levan Metreveli (ESP)	1

Quarterfinals
Izhavokhir Iristayev (KAZ)	1
Kim Sung-gwon (KOR)	6
Nurbol Pulatov (KAZ)	1
Thomas Epp (SUI)	5
Cho Hyeon-su (KOR)	12
Zangar Kabylbekov (KAZ)	2
Suraj Singh (NZL)	0
Diamantino Iuna Fafé (GBS)	10

Semifinals
Kim Sung-gwon (KOR)	6
Thomas Epp (SUI)	2
Cho Hyeon-su (KOR)	10
Diamantino Iuna Fafé (GBS)	0

Final
Kim Sung-gwon (KOR)	3
Cho Hyeon-su (KOR)	1

Repechage round 1
Levan Metreveli (ESP)	2
Izhavokhir Iristayev (KAZ)	2
Zangar Kabylbekov (KAZ)
Bye

Bronze medals
Thomas Epp (SUI)	9
Izhavokhir Iristayev (KAZ)	9
Diamantino Iuna Fafé (GBS)	7
Zangar Kabylbekov (KAZ)	12

==== Men's freestyle 61 kg ====
Quarterfinals		Semifinals		Final
Mika Lehmkuhl (RSA)	2
Ramzan Awtaew (GER)	12	Ramzan Awtaew (GER)	0
Elkin España (COL)	2	Stevan Mićić (SRB)	6
Stevan Mićić (SRB)	12			Stevan Mićić (SRB)	9
Garette Saunders (CAN)	0			Talap Zholdasov (KAZ)	7
Talap Zholdasov (KAZ)	10	Talap Zholdasov (KAZ)	10
Nils Leutert (SUI)	3	Nils Leutert (SUI)	0
Agustín Sánchez (ESP)	1

Bronze medals
Elkin España (COL)	4
Ramzan Awtaew (GER)	16
Garette Saunders (CAN)	0
Nils Leutert (SUI)	8

==== Men's freestyle 65 kg ====
Final
Ayub Musaev (BEL)	5
Lachlan McNeil (CAN)	9

Round of 32
Dominik Laritz (SUI)	14
Nino Leutert (SUI)	8
Ayub Musaev (BEL)	6
Dominik Jagusz (POL)	1

Round of 16
Juan Pablo González (ESP)	17
Mike Zale (CAN)	6
Dominik Laritz (SUI)	0
Carlos Álvarez (ESP)	10
Daulet Yerimbetov (KAZ)	1
Ayub Musaev (BEL)	12
Felipe Ferrusola (ESP)	2
Yerassyl Mukhtaruly (KAZ)	8

Quarterfinals
Juan Pablo González (ESP)
Carlos Álvarez (ESP)	WO
Ayub Musaev (BEL)	6
Yerassyl Mukhtaruly (KAZ)	1

Semifinals
Carlos Álvarez (ESP)	2
Ayub Musaev (BEL)	6

Round of 32
Carlos Gual (ESP)	5
Camilo Sotelo (COL)	15

Round of 16
Rifat Saibotalov (KAZ)	3
Krzysztof Bieńkowski (POL)	2
Carlos Lomba (ESP)	0
Kim Chang-su (KOR)	10
Bekzat Yermekbay (KAZ)	17
Camilo Sotelo (COL)	5
Joao Benavides (PER)
Lachlan McNeil (CAN)	WO

Quarterfinals
Rifat Saibotalov (KAZ)	1
Kim Chang-su (KOR)	5
Bekzat Yermekbay (KAZ)	4
Lachlan McNeil (CAN)	14

Semifinals
Kim Chang-su (KOR)	4
Lachlan McNeil (CAN)	10

Repechage round 1
Dominik Jagusz (POL)	2
Daulet Yerimbetov (KAZ)	12
Joao Benavides (PER)
Bye

Repechage round 2
Yerassyl Mukhtaruly (KAZ)	6
Daulet Yerimbetov (KAZ)	1
Bekzat Yermekbay (KAZ)	WO
Joao Benavides (PER)

Bronze medals
Carlos Álvarez (ESP)	10
Yerassyl Mukhtaruly (KAZ)	8
Kim Chang-su (KOR)	1
Bekzat Yermekbay (KAZ)	5

==== Men's freestyle 70 kg ====
Round of 16
Saúl Bello (ESP)	0
Michael Asselstine (CAN)	10
Timur Shanbaev (KAZ)	4
Kim Cheol-song (KOR)	3
Connor Quinton (CAN)	6
Kuanysh Duisenkul (KAZ)	12

Quarterfinals
Rodion Anchugin (KAZ)	6
Michael Asselstine (CAN)	1
Kurmanbek Kaipanov (KAZ)	13
Sehajpal Sidhu (CAN)	2
Javier Díaz-Alejo (ESP)	5
Timur Shanbaev (KAZ)	7
Kuanysh Duisenkul (KAZ)	3
Marc Dietsche (SUI)	2

Semifinals
Rodion Anchugin (KAZ)	9
Kurmanbek Kaipanov (KAZ)	10
Timur Shanbaev (KAZ)	0
Kuanysh Duisenkul (KAZ)	10

Final
Kurmanbek Kaipanov (KAZ)	1
Kuanysh Duisenkul (KAZ)	6

Repechage round 1
Sehajpal Sidhu (CAN)
Bye
Connor Quinton (CAN)	2
Marc Dietsche (SUI)	4

Bronze medals
Rodion Anchugin (KAZ)	10
Sehajpal Sidhu (CAN)	0
Timur Shanbaev (KAZ)	2
Marc Dietsche (SUI)	8

==== Men's freestyle 74 kg ====
Final
Kanat Mussabekov (KAZ)	2
Alibek Abdikassymov (KAZ)	3

Round of 32
Patrik Leder (CAN)	3
Joan Serna (COL)	8

Round of 16
Kanat Mussabekov (KAZ)	8
Jasmit Phulka (CAN)	4
Joan Serna (COL)	4
Szymon Wojtkowski (POL)	14
Shamil Ustaev (GER)	2
Zhengis Kanybekov (KAZ)	4
Gong Byung-min (KOR)	8
Tobias Portmann (SUI)	5

Quarterfinals
Kanat Mussabekov (KAZ)	3
Szymon Wojtkowski (POL)	1
Zhengis Kanybekov (KAZ)	10
Gong Byung-min (KOR)	0

Semifinals
Kanat Mussabekov (KAZ)	3
Zhengis Kanybekov (KAZ)	3

Round of 32
Roni Nevalainen (FIN)	0
Alibek Abdikassymov (KAZ)	10

Round of 16
Mohamed El-Karchouh (ESP)	0
Kamil Rybicki (POL)	11
Alibek Abdikassymov (KAZ)	10
Olav Ronæs (NOR)	0
Pablo Díez (ESP)	4
Patryk Ołenczyn (POL)	16
Cole Hawkins (NZL)	12
Adrián Carrasco (ESP)	2

Quarterfinals
Kamil Rybicki (POL)	0
Alibek Abdikassymov (KAZ)	11
Patryk Ołenczyn (POL)	10
Cole Hawkins (NZL)	0

Semifinals
Alibek Abdikassymov (KAZ)	9
Patryk Ołenczyn (POL)	0

Repechage round 1
Jasmit Phulka (CAN)
Bye
Roni Nevalainen (FIN)	6
Olav Ronæs (NOR)	4

Repechage round 2
Szymon Wojtkowski (POL)	5
Jasmit Phulka (CAN)	6
Kamil Rybicki (POL)	10
Roni Nevalainen (FIN)	0

Bronze medals
Zhengis Kanybekov (KAZ)	4
Jasmit Phulka (CAN)	3
Patryk Ołenczyn (POL)	0
Kamil Rybicki (POL)	3^{F}

==== Men's freestyle 79 kg ====
Round of 16
Ahmad Magomedov (MKD)	11
Shamsat Tair (KAZ)	2
Lucas Kahnt (GER)	11
Azael García (ESP)	0
Joona Vuoti (FIN)	5^{F}
Daniel Petrov (ESP)	1
Erik Reinbok (EST)	7
Zaur Efendiev (SRB)	0

Quarterfinals
Gabriel Iglesias (ESP)	0
Ahmad Magomedov (MKD)	8
Lucas Kahnt (GER)	3
Sam Barmish (CAN)	6
Nurzhigit Mustafa (KAZ)	3
Joona Vuoti (FIN)	2
Erik Reinbok (EST)	8
Callum McNeice (CAN)	3

Semifinals
Ahmad Magomedov (MKD)	10
Sam Barmish (CAN)	0
Nurzhigit Mustafa (KAZ)	3
Erik Reinbok (EST)	0

Final
Ahmad Magomedov (MKD)	6
Nurzhigit Mustafa (KAZ)	0

Repechage round 1
Shamsat Tair (KAZ)	10
Gabriel Iglesias (ESP)	0
Joona Vuoti (FIN)
Bye

Bronze medals
Sam Barmish (CAN)	2
Shamsat Tair (KAZ)	5
Erik Reinbok (EST)	1
Joona Vuoti (FIN)	1

==== Men's freestyle 86 kg ====
Round of 16
Alex Moore (CAN)	4
Joshua Morodion (GER)	3
Taimuraz Friev (ESP)	10
Aibek Aitbekov (KAZ)	0
Uri Kalashnikov (ISR)	5^{F}
Domantas Pauliuščenko (LTU)	1
[[Jaime García-Zozaya]] (ESP)	0
Islyambek Ilyassov (KAZ)	10
Kim Gwan-uk (KOR)	10
Miko Elkala (FIN)	0
Andrew Johnson (CAN)	1
Aidyn Tazhigali (KAZ)	6
Aimar Andruse (EST)	2
Cezary Sadowski (POL)	4

Quarterfinals
Anar Guliyev (KAZ)	0
Alex Moore (CAN)	10
Taimuraz Friev (ESP)	2
Uri Kalashnikov (ISR)	0
Islyambek Ilyassov (KAZ)	0
Kim Gwan-uk (KOR)	10
Aidyn Tazhigali (KAZ)	0
Cezary Sadowski (POL)	7

Semifinals
Alex Moore (CAN)	0
Taimuraz Friev (ESP)	10
Kim Gwan-uk (KOR)	5
Cezary Sadowski (POL)	5

Final
Taimuraz Friev (ESP)	6
Kim Gwan-uk (KOR)	5

Repechage round 1
Aibek Aitbekov (KAZ)	0
Uri Kalashnikov (ISR)	10
Miko Elkala (FIN)	6
Islyambek Ilyassov (KAZ)	5

Bronze medals
Alex Moore (CAN)	2
Uri Kalashnikov (ISR)	1
Cezary Sadowski (POL)	6
Miko Elkala (FIN)	0

==== Men's freestyle 92 kg ====
Pos	Athlete	Pld	W	L	CP	TP	KAZ	POL	ESP	COL
1	Bekzat Amangali (KAZ)	3	3	0	12	19	—	4–3	4–0 Fall	11–0
2	Filip Rogut (POL)	3	2	1	9	24	1–3 PO1	—	10–0	11–0
3	Aimar Alzón (ESP)	3	1	2	3	2	0–5 FA	0–4 SU	—	2–1
4	Brayan Saa (COL)	3	0	3	1	1	0–4 SU	0–4 SU	1–3 PO1	—

Source: UWW

Pos	Athlete	Pld	W	L	CP	TP	GER	KAZ	POL
1	Rahmatullah Moradi (GER)	2	2	0	8	5	—	5–2	WO
2	Serzhan Yeleussiz (KAZ)	2	1	1	5	13	1–3 PO1	—	11–0
3	Michał Bielawski (POL)	2	0	2	0	0	0–5 IN	0–4 SU	—

Source: UWW

Semifinals
Bekzat Amangali (KAZ)	4
Serzhan Yeleussiz (KAZ)	8
Rahmatullah Moradi (GER)	5
Filip Rogut (POL)	0

Final
Serzhan Yeleussiz (KAZ)	2
Rahmatullah Moradi (GER)	4
Bronze medal
Bekzat Amangali (KAZ)	6
Filip Rogut (POL)	1

==== Men's freestyle 97 kg ====
Round of 16
Riley Otto (CAN)	8
Lukas Krasauskas (LTU)	3

Quarterfinals
Ertuğrul Ağca (GER)	10
Riley Otto (CAN)	0
Magomedgaji Nurov (MKD)	3^{R}
Seo Ju-hwan (KOR)	6
Johannes Mayer (GER)	2
Nishan Randhawa (CAN)	4
Akezhan Aitbekov (KAZ)	8
Samuel Scherrer (SUI)	3

Semifinals
Ertuğrul Ağca (GER)	1
Seo Ju-hwan (KOR)	6
Nishan Randhawa (CAN)	2
Akezhan Aitbekov (KAZ)	7

Final
Seo Ju-hwan (KOR)	9
Akezhan Aitbekov (KAZ)	5

Repechage round 1
Magomedgaji Nurov (MKD)
Bye
Samuel Scherrer (SUI)
Bye

Bronze medals
Ertuğrul Ağca (GER)	WO
Magomedgaji Nurov (MKD)
Nishan Randhawa (CAN)	4
Samuel Scherrer (SUI)	3

==== Men's freestyle 125 kg ====
Pos	Athlete	Pld	W	L	CP	TP	KOR	ESP	CAN
1	Jung Yei-hyun (KOR)	2	2	0	6	15	—	7–6	8–0
2	José Cuba (ESP)	2	1	1	5	17	1–3 PO1	—	11–0
3	Roger Li (CAN)	2	0	2	0	0	0–3 PO	0–4 SU	—

Source: UWW

Pos	Athlete	Pld	W	L	CP	TP	COL	ESP	KAZ
1	Jhoan Ocoro (COL)	2	2	0	6	18	—	12–2	11–1
2	Carlos Acebrón (ESP)	2	1	1	5	13	1–4 SU1	—	11–0
3	Olzhas Nurgaliyev (KAZ)	2	0	2	1	5	1–4 SU1	0–4 SU	—

Source: UWW

Semifinals
Jung Yei-hyun (KOR)	4
Carlos Acebrón (ESP)	1
Jhoan Ocoro (COL)	WO
José Cuba (ESP)

Final
Jung Yei-hyun (KOR)	5
Jhoan Ocoro (COL)	1
Bronze medal
Carlos Acebrón (ESP)	WO
José Cuba (ESP)

=== Men's Greco-Roman ===
==== Men's Greco-Roman 55 kg ====
Pos	Athlete	Pld	W	L	CP	TP	KAZ	KAZ	ESP
1	Meirambek Bekarys (KAZ)	2	2	0	6	14	—	5–4	9–6
2	Armiya Kuat (KAZ)	2	1	1	5	14	1–3 PO1	—	10–2
3	James Castaño (ESP)	2	0	2	2	8	1–3 PO1	1–4 SU1	—

Source: UWW

==== Men's Greco-Roman 60 kg ====
Quarterfinals		Semifinals		Final
Son Hee-dong (KOR)	6
Aser Ebro (ESP)	1	Son Hee-dong (KOR)	3
Huang Jui-chi (TPE)	6	Kim Da-hyun (KOR)	12
Kim Da-hyun (KOR)	7			Kim Da-hyun (KOR)	3
Daniel Bobillo (ESP)	0			Bakytzhan Kabdyl (KAZ)	7^{F}
Olzhas Sultan (KAZ)	8	Olzhas Sultan (KAZ)	1
Park Seung-hun (KOR)	0	Bakytzhan Kabdyl (KAZ)	3
Bakytzhan Kabdyl (KAZ)	8

Bronze medals
Huang Jui-chi (TPE)	2
Son Hee-dong (KOR)	8
Park Seung-hun (KOR)	1
Olzhas Sultan (KAZ)	9

==== Men's Greco-Roman 63 kg ====
Pos	Athlete	Pld	W	L	CP	TP	KAZ	SUI	ESP
1	Kanat Akytbek (KAZ)	2	2	0	8	6	—	2–1	4–1 Fall
2	Jonas Urs Müller (SUI)	2	1	1	4	16	1–3 VPO1	—	15–10
3	Diego Esteche (ESP)	2	0	2	1	11	0–5 VFA	1–3 VPO1	—

Source: UWW

Pos	Athlete	Pld	W	L	CP	TP	KAZ	KOR	COL
1	Iliyas Dauitov (KAZ)	2	1	1	5	11	—	10–2	1–3
2	Jeong Yeong-woo (KOR)	2	1	1	5	11	1–4 SU1	—	9–0
3	Ronaldo Sánchez (COL)	2	1	1	3	3	3–1 VPO1	0–4 VSU	—

Source: UWW

Semifinals
Kanat Akytbek (KAZ)	1
Jeong Yeong-woo (KOR)	7
Iliyas Dauitov (KAZ)	12
Jonas Urs Müller (SUI)	4

Final
Jeong Yeong-woo (KOR)	3
Iliyas Dauitov (KAZ)	3
Bronze medal
Kanat Akytbek (KAZ)	5
Jonas Urs Müller (SUI)	3^{R}

==== Men's Greco-Roman 67 kg ====
Pos	Athlete	Pld	W	L	CP	TP	KAZ	PER	ESP
1	Almatbek Amanbek (KAZ)	2	2	0	8	6	—	2–1	4–1 Fall
2	Nilton Soto (PER)	2	1	1	4	16	1–3 VPO1	—	15–10
3	Daniel Campos (ESP)	2	0	2	1	11	0–5 VFA	1–3 VPO1	—

Source: UWW

Pos	Athlete	Pld	W	L	CP	TP	ECU	COL	KAZ
1	Andrés Montaño (ECU)	2	1	1	5	11	—	10–2	1–3
2	Andrés Cortés (COL)	2	1	1	5	11	1–4 SU1	—	9–0
3	Mardan Zhaksylyk (KAZ)	2	1	1	3	3	3–1 VPO1	0–4 VSU	—

Source: UWW

Semifinals
Kanat Akytbek (KAZ)	1
Jeong Yeong-woo (KOR)	7
Iliyas Dauitov (KAZ)	12
Jonas Urs Müller (SUI)	4

Final
Jeong Yeong-woo (KOR)	3
Iliyas Dauitov (KAZ)	3
Bronze medal
Kanat Akytbek (KAZ)	5
Jonas Urs Müller (SUI)	3^{R}

==== Men's Greco-Roman 72 kg ====
Pos	Athlete	Pld	W	L	CP	TP	SUI	FIN	ESP	NOR
1	Michael Portmann (SUI)	3	3	0	12	24	—	7–5	8–0	9–4 Fall
2	Joni Komppa (FIN)	3	2	1	8	23	1–3 PO1	—	7–0	11–0
3	Júnior Gustavo (ESP)	3	1	2	3	9	0–4 SU	0–3 PO	—	2–1
4	Gilani Dzortov (NOR)	3	0	3	2	14	0–5 FA	0–4 SU	1–3 PO1	—

Source: UWW

Pos	Athlete	Pld	W	L	CP	TP	KAZ	SUI	SUI
1	Temirlan Mamytbek (KAZ)	2	2	0	9	16	—	6–0 Fall	10–8
2	David Loher (SUI)	2	1	1	3	7	0–5 FA	—	7–4
3	Maurus Zogg (SUI)	2	0	2	2	12	1–3 PO1	1–3 PO1	—

Source: UWW

Semifinals
Michael Portmann (SUI)	5
David Loher (SUI)	3
Temirlan Mamytbek (KAZ)	0
Joni Komppa (FIN)	9

Final
Michael Portmann (SUI)	5
Joni Komppa (FIN)	3
Bronze medal
David Loher (SUI)	6
Temirlan Mamytbek (KAZ)	7

==== Men's Greco-Roman 77 kg ====
Pos	Athlete	Pld	W	L	CP	TP	ESP	COL	ESP	ESP
1	Marcos Sánchez-Silva (ESP)	3	2	1	9	21	—	7–3	6–9	8–0 Fall
2	Hanner Ramírez (COL)	3	2	1	9	19	1–3 PO1	—	8–0	8–0
3	Yuisralembert Carrión (ESP)	3	2	1	6	15	3–1 PO1	0–4 SU	—	6–1
4	Manuel Muñoz (ESP)	3	0	3	1	1	0–5 FA	0–4 SU	1–3 PO1	—

Source: UWW

==== Men's Greco-Roman 82 kg ====
Pos	Athlete	Pld	W	L	CP	TP	KAZ	ESP	ESP
1	Damir Tursunov (KAZ)	2	2	0	8	17	—	8–0	9–0
2	Mohamed Amin Mainich (ESP)	2	1	1	5	6	0–4 SU	—	6–4 Fall
3	Andrés González (ESP)	2	0	2	0	4	0–4 SU	0–5 FA	—

Source: UWW

==== Men's Greco-Roman 87 kg ====
Pos	Athlete	Pld	W	L	CP	TP	FIN	COL	ESP
1	Waltteri Latvala (FIN)	2	2	0	8	21	—	9–0	12–4
2	Juan José González (COL)	2	1	1	3	9	0–4 SU	—	9–2
3	Daniel Herrero (ESP)	2	0	2	2	6	1–4 SU1	1–3 PO1	—

Source: UWW

==== Men's Greco-Roman 97 kg ====
Pos	Athlete	Pld	W	L	CP	TP	FIN	KOR	ESP	USA
1	Arvi Savolainen (FIN)	3	3	0	12	27	—	8–0	11–2	8–0
2	Kwon Jeong-yul (KOR)	3	2	1	7	14	0–4 SU	—	4–0	10–2
3	José Ferrándiz (ESP)	3	1	2	5	10	1–4 SU1	0–3 VPO	—	8–0
4	Shaun Heist (USA)	3	0	3	1	2	0–4 SU	1–4 SU1	0–4 SU	—

Source: UWW

==== Men's Greco-Roman 130 kg ====
Pos	Athlete	Pld	W	L	CP	TP	FIN	COL	ESP
1	Courtney Freeman (USA)	2	2	0	8	21	—	9–0	12–4
2	Óscar Loango (COL)	2	1	1	3	9	0–4 SU	—	9–2
3	Gerónimo Cámara (ESP)	2	0	2	2	6	1–4 SU1	1–3 PO1	—

Source: UWW

=== Women's freestyle ===
==== Women's freestyle 50 kg ====
Round of 16
Cheon Mi-ran (KOR)	12
María Cazalla (ESP)	1
Dannia Figueroa (COL)	0
Jacqueline Mollocana (ECU)	11
Justine Vigouroux (FRA)	0
Augusta Eve (CAN)	6^{F}
Lin Yung-hsun (TPE)	4
Erin Golston (USA)	8
Amanda Tomczyk (POL)	1
Veronika Ryabovolova (MKD)	2

Quarterfinals
Audrey Jimenez (USA)	11
Cheon Mi-ran (KOR)	4
Jacqueline Mollocana (ECU)	10
Augusta Eve (CAN)	0
Ana Torres (ESP)	0
Erin Golston (USA)	10
Veronika Ryabovolova (MKD)	0
Mercy Genesis (NGR)	10

Semifinals
Audrey Jimenez (USA)	9
Jacqueline Mollocana (ECU)	10
Erin Golston (USA)	0
Mercy Genesis (NGR)	10

Final
Jacqueline Mollocana (ECU)	2
Mercy Genesis (NGR)	15

Repechage round 1
Dannia Figueroa (COL)	3
Augusta Eve (CAN)	1
Veronika Ryabovolova (MKD)
Bye

Bronze medals
Audrey Jimenez (USA)	10
Dannia Figueroa (COL)	0
Erin Golston (USA)	0
Veronika Ryabovolova (MKD)	8

==== Women's freestyle 53 kg ====
Round of 16
Hsieh Meng-hsuan (TPE)	6
Oh Hyun-young (KOR)	4
SueAnne Harms (CAN)	10^{F}
Thalía Mallqui (PER)	4
Annika Fines (CAN)	0
Maria Prevolaraki (GRE)	6
Joséphine Haemmerle (FRA)	0
Katie Gomez (USA)	10
Maria Ferone (ITA)	6
Amber Wiebe (CAN)	10
Weronika Sikora (POL)	2
Eva González (COL)	6

Quarterfinals
Amani Jones (USA)	4^{F}
Hsieh Meng-hsuan (TPE)	0
SueAnne Harms (CAN)	0
Maria Prevolaraki (GRE)	8^{F}
Katie Gomez (USA)	10
Amber Wiebe (CAN)	0
Eva González (COL)	2
Alisha Howk (USA)	3

Semifinals
Amani Jones (USA)	1
Maria Prevolaraki (GRE)	6
Katie Gomez (USA)	4
Alisha Howk (USA)	0

Final
Maria Prevolaraki (GRE)	2
Katie Gomez (USA)	4

Repechage round 1
Annika Fines (CAN)	1
SueAnne Harms (CAN)	8
Joséphine Haemmerle (FRA)	10
Amber Wiebe (CAN)	0

Bronze medals
Amani Jones (USA)	6
SueAnne Harms (CAN)	2
Alisha Howk (USA)	11
Joséphine Haemmerle (FRA)	0

==== Women's freestyle 55 kg ====
Pos	Athlete	Pld	W	L	CP	TP	USA	CAN	ESP
1	Montana DeLawder (USA)	2	2	0	9	14	—	10–0	4–0 Fall
2	Grace Lew (CAN)	2	1	1	3	8	0–4 SU	—	8–4
3	Elena Torres (ESP)	2	0	2	1	4	0–5 VFA	1–3 VPO1	—

Source: UWW

Pos	Athlete	Pld	W	L	CP	TP	COL	USA	Bye
1	Carolina Castillo (COL)	1	1	0	3	6	—	10–2	
2	Sofia Macaluso (USA)	1	0	1	1	1	1–4 SU1	—	
3	Bye	0	0	0	0	0	0–5 FO	0–5 FO	—

Source: UWW

Semifinals
Montana DeLawder (USA)	6^{F}
Sofia Macaluso (USA)	2
Carolina Castillo (COL)	11
Grace Lew (CAN)	0

Final
Montana DeLawder (USA)	1
Carolina Castillo (COL)	5
Bronze medal
Sofia Macaluso (USA)	11
Grace Lew (CAN)	0

==== Women's freestyle 57 kg ====
Round of 16
Victoria Báez (ESP)	2
Graciela Sánchez (ESP)	2

Quarterfinals
Kwon Young-jin (KOR)	8^{F}
Graciela Sánchez (ESP)	1
Angelika Mytkowska (POL)	0
Evelina Nikolova (BUL)	12
Bark Jeong-ae (KOR)	6
Mia Friesen (CAN)	6^{F}
Gaëlle Ruiz (FRA)	0
Tianna Kennett (CAN)	8^{F}

Semifinals
Kwon Young-jin (KOR)	7
Evelina Nikolova (BUL)	10
Mia Friesen (CAN)	3
Tianna Kennett (CAN)	2

Final
Evelina Nikolova (BUL)	10
Mia Friesen (CAN)	6

Repechage round 1
Angelika Mytkowska (POL)
Bye
Bark Jeong-ae (KOR)
Bye

Bronze medals
Kwon Young-jin (KOR)	6^{F}
Angelika Mytkowska (POL)	1
Tianna Kennett (CAN)	8
Bark Jeong-ae (KOR)	0

==== Women's freestyle 59 kg ====
Pos	Athlete	Pld	W	L	CP	TP	CAN	USA	FRA
1	Hannah Taylor (CAN)	2	2	0	10	15	—	10–2 Fall	5–0 Fall
2	Alexis Janiak (USA)	2	1	1	4	13	0–5 VFA	—	11–0
3	Amel Rebiha (FRA)	2	0	2	0	0	0–5 VFA	0–4 VSU	—

Source: UWW

Pos	Athlete	Pld	W	L	CP	TP	USA	GBR	CAN
1	Xochitl Mota-Pettis (USA)	2	1	1	5	11	—	10–0	10–0 Fall
2	Kelsey Barnes (GBR)	2	1	1	5	11	0–4 VSU	—	11–0
3	Michaela Rankin (CAN)	2	1	1	3	3	0–5 VFA	0–4 VSU	—

Source: UWW

Semifinals
Hannah Taylor (CAN)	10^{F}
Kelsey Barnes (GBR)	0
Xochitl Mota-Pettis (USA)	14
Alexis Janiak (USA)	3

Final
Hannah Taylor (CAN)	3^{F}
Xochitl Mota-Pettis (USA)	10
Bronze medal
Kelsey Barnes (GBR)	3
Alexis Janiak (USA)	13

==== Women's freestyle 62 kg ====
Round of 16
Lee Han-bit (KOR)	1
Ashlynn Ortega (USA)	3
Miren Huarte (ESP)	0
Miki Rowbottom (CAN)	4^{F}
Marisol Nugent (USA)	8
Elena Esposito (ITA)	7

Quarterfinals
Lydia Pérez (ESP)	3
Ashlynn Ortega (USA)	4
Anays Mesa (COL)	2
Leonela Ayoví (ECU)	6^{F}
Pai Hsin-ping (TPE)	4
Miki Rowbottom (CAN)	8
Marisol Nugent (USA)	0
Esther Kolawole (NGR)	10

Semifinals
Ashlynn Ortega (USA)	6
Leonela Ayoví (ECU)	5
Miki Rowbottom (CAN)	3
Esther Kolawole (NGR)	7

Final
Ashlynn Ortega (USA)	0
Esther Kolawole (NGR)	7

Repechage round 1
Lee Han-bit (KOR)	0
Lydia Pérez (ESP)	10
Marisol Nugent (USA)}
Bye

Bronze medals
Leonela Ayoví (ECU)	3
Lydia Pérez (ESP)	4
Miki Rowbottom (CAN)	7
Marisol Nugent (USA)	7

==== Women's freestyle 65 kg ====
Pos	Athlete	Pld	W	L	CP	TP	COL	USA	USA	ESP	ESP
1	Valentina Andrades (COL)	4	4	0	16	40	—	7–3	8–1	10–2	10–0
2	Skylar Hattendorf (USA)	4	3	1	12	33	1–3 PO1	—	10–0	5–0 Fall	10–0
3	Madeline Kubicki (USA)	4	2	2	10	18	1–3 PO1	0–4 SU	—	10–0	7–0 Fall
4	Marta Ojeda (ESP)	4	1	3	4	12	1–3 PO1	0–5 VFA	0–4 SU	—	10–2
5	Manuela Noguero (ESP)	4	0	4	1	2	0–4 SU	0–4 SU	0–5 VFA	1–3 PO1	—

Source: UWW

==== Women's freestyle 68 kg ====
Round of 16
Bella Mir (USA)	5
Lorena Lera (ESP)	3
Nerea Pampín (ESP)	2
Yanet Sovero (PER)	2
Olivia Di Bacco (CAN)	11
Paulina Danisz (POL)	0

Quarterfinals
Vanessa Keefe (CAN)	0
Bella Mir (USA)	2^{F}
Park Hyeon-yeong (KOR)	10
Ellise Daynes (CAN)	1
Katerina Lange (USA)	WO
Yanet Sovero (PER)
Olivia Di Bacco (CAN)	4
Blessing Oborududu (NGR)	2

Semifinals
Bella Mir (USA)	2^{F}
Park Hyeon-yeong (KOR)	0
Katerina Lange (USA)	0
Olivia Di Bacco (CAN)	10

Final
Bella Mir (USA)	2^{F}
Olivia Di Bacco (CAN)	11

Repechage round 1
Lorena Lera (ESP)	0
Vanessa Keefe (CAN)	10
Paulina Danisz (POL)	0
Blessing Oborududu (NGR)	10

Bronze medals
Park Hyeon-yeong (KOR)	8^{F}
Vanessa Keefe (CAN)	0
Katerina Lange (USA)	0
Blessing Oborududu (NGR)	10

==== Women's freestyle 72 kg ====
Pos	Athlete	Pld	W	L	CP	TP	USA	COL	USA	ESP
1	Kaylynn Albrecht (USA)	3	3	0	12	30	—	10–0	10–0	10–0
2	María Ceballos (COL)	3	2	1	7	15	0–4 SU	—	5–5	10–0
3	Rose Cassioppi (USA)	3	1	2	5	15	0–4 SU	1–3 PO1	—	10–0
4	Yasmín Alonso (ESP)	3	0	3	0	0	0–4 SU	0–4 SU	0–4 SU	—

Source: UWW

==== Women's freestyle 76 kg ====
Quarterfinals		Semifinals		Final
		Chang Hui-tsz (TPE)	8^{F}
Itziar Rekalde (ESP)	1	Brianna Fraser (CAN)	5
Brianna Fraser (CAN)	4^{F}			Chang Hui-tsz (TPE)	4^{F}
Ashley Lekas (USA)	10			Ashley Lekas (USA)	0
Jeong Seo-yeon (KOR)	0	Ashley Lekas (USA)	6^{F}
Shauna Kuebeck (CAN)	4^{F}	Shauna Kuebeck (CAN)	0
Patrycja Sperka (POL)	2

Bronze medals
Brianna Fraser (CAN)
Bye
Jeong Seo-yeon (KOR)	5
Shauna Kuebeck (CAN)	0
