= Wrestling at the 2022 Commonwealth Games – Men's freestyle 57 kg =

Wrestling competition

Wrestling – Men's freestyle 57 kg at the 2022 Commonwealth Games
- Venue: Coventry Arena
- Dates: 6 August 2022
- Competitors: 10 from 10 nations

Medalists
| gold medal | Ravi Kumar Dahiya | India |
| silver medal | Ebikewenimo Welson | Nigeria |
| bronze medal | Darthe Capellan | Canada |
| bronze medal | Suraj Singh | New Zealand |

The Men's freestyle 57 kg wrestling competitions at the 2022 Commonwealth Games in Birmingham, England took place on 6 August at the Coventry Arena. A total of 10 competitors from 10 nations took part.

This freestyle wrestling competition consists of a single-elimination tournament, with a repechage used to determine the winner of two bronze medals. The two finalists face off for gold and silver medals. Each wrestler who loses to one of the two finalists moves into the repechage, culminating in a pair of bronze medal matches featuring the semifinal losers each facing the remaining repechage opponent from their half of the bracket.

Pakistani athlete Ali Asad failed his dope test and was stripped of his bronze medal, and Suraj Singh from New Zealand was upgraded to bronze.

== Results ==
The draw is as follows:

Legend

- F — Won by fall

=== Main bracket ===
Round of 16
Gary Giordmaina (MLT) | 8
Justin Holland (AUS) | 4
~~Ali Asad (PAK)~~ | 10
Harvey Ridings (ENG) | 0

Quarterfinals
Darthe Capellan (CAN) | 12
Gary Giordmaina (MLT) | 2
Ebikewenimo Welson (NGR) | 10
Jakobo Tau (RSA) | 0
Suraj Singh (NZL) | 0
Ravi Kumar Dahiya (IND) | 10
~~Ali Asad (PAK)~~ | 10
Romio Goliath (NAM) | 0

Semifinals
Darthe Capellan (CAN) | 4
Ebikewenimo Welson (NGR) | 8
Ravi Kumar Dahiya (IND) | 14
~~Ali Asad (PAK)~~ | 4

Final
Ebikewenimo Welson (NGR) | 0
Ravi Kumar Dahiya (IND) | 10

=== Repechage ===
Bronze medal matches
Jakobo Tau (RSA) | 2
Darthe Capellan (CAN) | 12
Suraj Singh (NZL) | 0
~~Ali Asad (PAK)~~ | 11
