= 2021 U20 Pan American Wrestling Championships =

- Host city: Oaxtepec, Mexico
- Dates: 9–13 June 2021

Champions
- Freestyle: United States
- Greco-Roman: United States
- Women: United States

The 2021 U20 Pan American Wrestling Championships was held from 9 to 13 June in Oaxtepec, Mexico.

== Medal summary ==
=== Men's freestyle ===
Event	Gold	Silver	Bronze
57 kg	Osmany Diversent Martinez; Cuba	Ryan Miller; United States	Fotis Papadopoulos; Canada
57 kg	Osmany Diversent Martinez; Cuba	Ryan Miller; United States	Diego Zuluaga; Colombia
61 kg	Carter Young; United States	Diego Olvera Rodriguez; Mexico	Bryan de Oliviera Pereira; Brazil
61 kg	Carter Young; United States	Diego Olvera Rodriguez; Mexico	Kevin Carrasco Arteaga; Panama
65 kg	Lachlan McNeil; Canada	Angel Tinoco Torres; Peru	Leandro Vallejo Cabrera; Dominican Republic
65 kg	Lachlan McNeil; Canada	Angel Tinoco Torres; Peru	Chance Lamer; United States
70 kg	Edward Scott; United States	Lautaro Seghesso; Argentina	Amaan Gulacha; Canada
74 kg	Cade Devos; United States	Patrik Leder; Canada	Orislandy Perdomo Brooks; Cuba
74 kg	Cade Devos; United States	Patrik Leder; Canada	Juan Martinez; Dominican Republic
79 kg	Jacob Logan; United States	Carson Lee; Canada	Kevin De Leon Trevino; Mexico
86 kg	Darrien Roberts; United States	Liosbel Hernandez Bustamante; Cuba	Lucas Imbernon da Silva; Brazil
86 kg	Darrien Roberts; United States	Liosbel Hernandez Bustamante; Cuba	Juan Iturriza Ruiz; Mexico
92 kg	Tyler Hannah; United States	Karanpreet Gill; Canada	Adrian Zapata Jacobo; Mexico
97 kg	Arturo Silot Torres; Cuba	Santos Cantu; United States	Josue Campos Arizpe; Mexico
125 kg	Josh Heindelsman; United States	Gabriel de Sousa Silva; Brazil	Luis Orozco Cortez; Mexico
125 kg	Josh Heindelsman; United States	Gabriel de Sousa Silva; Brazil	Yoan Robert Ramirez; Cuba

=== Men's Greco-Roman ===
Event	Gold	Silver	Bronze
55 kg	Angel Segura Tellez; Mexico	Aizayah Yacapin; United States	Not awarded
60 kg	Yonaiker Martinez Cravo; Venezuela	Jeremy Peralta Gonzalez; Ecuador	Samuel Gutierrez Diaz; Cuba
60 kg	Yonaiker Martinez Cravo; Venezuela	Jeremy Peralta Gonzalez; Ecuador	Uvaldo Camacho Diaz; Mexico
63 kg	Antonio Ruiz Mora; Ecuador	Richard Fedalen; United States	Alan Salas Esquivel; Mexico
67 kg	Fernando Ferrer Ciprian; Dominican Republic	Payton Jacobson; United States	Piero Cruces Panaifo; Peru
67 kg	Fernando Ferrer Ciprian; Dominican Republic	Payton Jacobson; United States	Yosbani Napoles Mustelier; Cuba
72 kg	Noah Wachsmuth; United States	Wilfredo Lopez; Panama	Leag Guzman Padilla; Mexico
77 kg	Daniel Bello Vega; Venezuela	Brandon Calle; Colombia	Arlier La O Mendoza; Cuba
77 kg	Daniel Bello Vega; Venezuela	Brandon Calle; Colombia	Franco Chialanza; Argentina
82 kg	James Burks III; United States	Christian Medina Nunez; Mexico	Augusto Nieva; Argentina
87 kg	Tyler Hannah; United States	Juan Diaz Blanco; Venezuela	José Mosquera; Colombia
87 kg	Tyler Hannah; United States	Juan Diaz Blanco; Venezuela	Pedro Bello Soto; Mexico
97 kg	Igor Alves De Queiroz; Brazil	Daniel Veliz Perez; Mexico	Liober Betancourt Hechavarria; Cuba
97 kg	Igor Alves De Queiroz; Brazil	Daniel Veliz Perez; Mexico	Max Madrid De Leon; Panama
130 kg	Jeisser Sampson Sanchez; Cuba	Peter Christensen; United States	Juan Cantillo Torres; Panama

=== Women ===
Event	Gold	Silver	Bronze
50 kg	Lucía Yépez; Ecuador	Greili Bencosme Carvajal; Cuba	Gloria Asca Vilcapoma; Peru
50 kg	Lucía Yépez; Ecuador	Greili Bencosme Carvajal; Cuba	Yusmy Chaparro; Colombia
53 kg	Laura Herin Avila; Cuba	Jaslynn Gallegos; United States	Mariana Rojas Diaz; Venezuela
53 kg	Laura Herin Avila; Cuba	Jaslynn Gallegos; United States	Zaltzin Hernandez Guerra; Mexico
55 kg	Amani Jones; United States	Victoria Rosa Chavez; Mexico	Not awarded
57 kg	Mayra Parra Alvarez; Venezuela	Yailin Jimenez; Dominican Republic	Bronwyn MacGregor; Canada
57 kg	Mayra Parra Alvarez; Venezuela	Yailin Jimenez; Dominican Republic	Yaynelis Sanz Verdecia; Cuba
59 kg	London Houston; United States	Jolie Brisco; Canada	Lucero Sanchez Silva; Mexico
62 kg	Yolanda Cordero Vargas; Cuba	Astrid Montero Chirinos; Venezuela	Aliyah Yates; United States
62 kg	Yolanda Cordero Vargas; Cuba	Astrid Montero Chirinos; Venezuela	Alejandra Rivera Arriaga; Mexico
65 kg	Katerina Lange; United States	Aylah Mayali; Canada	Karime Martinez Teran; Mexico
68 kg	Nyla Burgess; Canada	Sandra Escamilla Menchaca; Mexico	Jamilex Cumbicos Castillo; Ecuador
68 kg	Nyla Burgess; Canada	Sandra Escamilla Menchaca; Mexico	Gloria Segura Febles; Dominican Republic
72 kg	Lillian Freitas; United States	Fernanda Marquez Martinez; Mexico	Not awarded
76 kg	Yelena Makoyed; United States	Linda Machuca; Argentina	Neirili Banguero Martinez; Venezuela
76 kg	Yelena Makoyed; United States	Linda Machuca; Argentina	Gabriela Canales Herrera; Mexico

== Medal table ==
* Host nation (Mexico)

Rank	Nation	Gold	Silver	Bronze	Total
1	United States	15	7	2	24
2	Cuba	5	2	7	14
3	Venezuela	3	2	2	7
4	Canada	2	5	3	10
5	Ecuador	2	1	1	4
6	Mexico*	1	6	14	21
7	Dominican Republic	1	1	3	5
8	Brazil	1	1	2	4
9	Argentina	0	2	2	4
10	Colombia	0	1	3	4
10	Panama	0	1	3	4
12	Peru	0	1	2	3
Totals (12 entries)		30	30	44	104

== Team ranking ==
Rank	Men's freestyle		Men's Greco-Roman		Women's freestyle	
Rank	Team	Points	Team	Points	Team	Points
1	United States	230	United States	177	United States	176
2	Mexico	129	Mexico	151	Mexico	147
3	Canada	123	Venezuela	102	Cuba	101
4	Cuba	110	Cuba	93	Canada	94
5	Brazil	58	Colombia	71	Venezuela	87
6	Panama	57	Ecuador	59	Ecuador	50
7	Argentina	42	Argentina	56	Brazil	50
8	Colombia	41	Panama	52	Dominican Republic	35
9	Venezuela	38	Dominican Republic	47	Peru	35
10	Dominican Republic	32	Brazil	44	Colombia	31
11	Peru	30	Peru	43	Argentina	26
12	Guatemala	20	Guatemala Paraguay	10	Puerto Rico	24
13	Ecuador	18	—		El Salvador	16
14	Puerto Rico	14	Puerto Rico	6	Chile	16
15	Barbados	12	Chile	4	Panama	12
16	El Salvador Paraguay	10	El Salvador Uruguay	0	Costa Rica Paraguay	0
17	—					
18	Chile	6				
19	Uruguay	0				
