= Wrestling at the 2013 Canada Summer Games =

Wrestling at the 2013 Canada Summer Games was in Sherbrooke, Quebec at the Cégep de Sherbrooke. It was held from the 6 to 8 August. There were 26 events of wrestling.

== Medal table ==
The following is the medal table for rowing at the 2013 Canada Summer Games.

* Host nation (Quebec)

Rank	Nation	Gold	Silver	Bronze	Total
1	Ontario	13	6	3	22
2	British Columbia	5	6	6	17
3	Alberta	4	3	2	9
4	Saskatchewan	1	6	9	16
5	Quebec*	1	2	2	5
6	New Brunswick	1	0	2	3
7	Prince Edward Island	0	2	0	2
8	Manitoba	0	1	1	2
Totals (8 entries)		25	26	25	76

== Results ==
=== Men ===
Event	Gold	Silver	Bronze
42 kg	Marco Palmero; Ontario	Cam Hicks; British Columbia	Kieran Akhtar; Saskatchewan
46 kg	Remular Bulaqui; British Columbia	Callum McNeice; Alberta	Jamal Anthony-Jr Henry; Ontario
50 kg	Phillip Le; Ontario	Darthe Capellan; British Columbia	Devin Kiryk; Saskatchewan
54 kg	Matt Dignan; British Columbia	Josh Bodnarchuk; Saskatchewan	Alex Moore; Quebec
58 kg	Dillon Williams; Ontario	Marc Magano; British Columbia	Riel Parisien; Saskatchewan
63 kg	Alec Mcneil; Ontario	Lucas Hoffert; Saskatchewan	Cody Osborn; British Columbia
69 kg	Jaskarn Ranu; British Columbia	Tyler Rowe; Ontario	Francis Carter; Quebec
76 kg	Nik Matycio; Alberta	Clayton Pye; Ontario	Nolan Badovinac; British Columbia
85 kg	Raj Gill; Ontario	Tyler Byron; Manitoba	Everett Bell; Saskatchewan
100 kg	Angus Cowell; Quebec	Pawanpreet Sekhon; Ontario	Mitch Lyons; Saskatchewan
115 kg	Ronald Bingham; Ontario	Isaac Lubiak; Saskatchewan	Pola Sahota; British Columbia
130 kg	Many Kahlon; British Columbia	Terrance Nolan; Quebec	Kody James Vakanis; Ontario
Team	Ontario	British Columbia	Saskatchewan

=== Women ===
Event	Gold	Silver	Bronze
38 kg	Stephanie Osburn; Alberta	not awarded	not awarded
40 kg	Erica Stirling; Ontario	Karah Bulaqui; British Columbia	Kaila Classen; Saskatchewan
43 kg	Jade Dufour; Ontario	Aurilla Wilson; Saskatchewan	Tiana Dykstra; British Columbia
46 kg	Emily Schaefer; Ontario	Nicole Tryhorn; Saskatchewan	Alex Schell; British Columbia
49 kg	Elizabeth Fagan; New Brunswick	Joannie Audet; Quebec	Vivian Mark; Alberta
52 kg	Julie Steffler; Ontario	Hannah Taylor; Prince Edward Island	Rachel Alder; Manitoba
56 kg	Alison Carrow; Ontario	Ashley Osachuk; British Columbia	Tianna Kennett; Saskatchewan
60 kg	Jess Brouillette; Ontario	Victoria Kent; Saskatchewan	Brandy Perry; British Columbia
65 kg	Temitope Ogunjimi; Alberta	Lorena Ellis; Prince Edward Island	Therese El-Lati; Ontario
70 kg	Gillian Boag; Alberta	Gracelynn Doogan; Ontario	Bailey Theriault; New Brunswick
80 kg	Georgina Nelthorpe; Saskatchewan	Kelsey Raab; Alberta	Shalina Mason; New Brunswick
90 kg	Payten Smith; British Columbia	Laura Barr; Ontario	Skyler Anderson; Alberta
Team	Ontario	Alberta	Saskatchewan

== See also ==
- 2013 in wrestling
