= 2013 in wrestling =

2013 in sport wrestling:

- 2013 World Wrestling Championships
- Belt wrestling at the 2013 Summer Universiade
- Wrestling at the 2013 Summer Universiade
- 2013 Asian Wrestling Championships
- 2013 European Wrestling Championships
- Wrestling at the 2013 Mediterranean Games
- Wrestling at the 2013 Canada Summer Games
