= Lachlan McNeil (wrestler) =

Canadian wrestler (born 2001)

Personal information
- Full name: Lachlan Maurice McNeil
- Nationality: Canadian
- Born: January 19, 2001 (age 25) Bahrain
- Height: 1.72 m (5 ft 8 in)
- Weight: 143 lb (65 kg)

Sport
- Country: Canada
- Sport: Wrestling
- Weight class: 143 lb (65 kg)
- Events: Freestyle and folkstyle
- College team: North Carolina
- Club: Tar Heel Wrestling Club; Team Impact Wrestling Club (Canada)
- Coached by: Coleman Scott; Tony Ramos (wrestler); Jamill Kelly; Mohamed Abdelfatah
Medal record
Men's freestyle wrestling
Representing Canada
Commonwealth Games
Silver medal – second place	2022 Birmingham	65 kg
International Tournaments
Gold medal – first place	2023 Madrid	65 kg
Bronze medal – third place	2022 Madrid	65 kg
Bronze medal – third place	2022 Summerside	65 kg
U20 Pan American Championships
Gold medal – first place	2021 Oaxtepec	65 kg

Lachlan Maurice McNeil (born January 19, 2001) is a Canadian freestyle wrestler and folkstyle wrestler who competes at 65 kilograms. During his professional career Lachlan has won two Canadian freestyle titles earning the right to represent Canada at the 2022 World Wrestling Championships. He was a silver medalist at the 2022 Commonwealth Games in Birmingham, England. Lachlan also wrestled for The University of North Carolina at Chapel Hill. He is currently attending Michigan, wrestling for them during the 2026 season.

== Freestyle career ==
Lachlan wrestled at the 2022 World Wrestling Championships representing team Canada. He earned a silver medal at the 2022 Commonwealth Games. He earned a bronze medal at the 2022 Grand Prix of Spain.

In 2024, he competed at the Pan American Wrestling Olympic Qualification Tournament held in Acapulco, Mexico hoping to qualify for the 2024 Summer Olympics in Paris, France. He was eliminated in his third match.

== College career ==
McNeil became an NCAA All-American at the 2023 NCAA Division I Wrestling Championships for the University of North Carolina. He finished third at the 2023 ACC Wrestling Championships. He became an All-American once again in 2026 while wrestling for Michigan.

== Personal life ==
McNeil's father Calum McNeil competed in the 1992 Olympics in men's freestyle wrestling for Great Britain. His younger brother Gregor McNeil attends McMaster University and also competes internationally for Canada.

== Freestyle record ==
Senior Freestyle Matches
Res.	Record	Opponent	Score	Date	Event	Location
2024 World Olympic Qualification Tournament DNP at 65 kg
Loss	26–9	(India) Sujeet Kalkal	TF 0–10	May 11, 2024	2024 World Olympic Qualification Tournament	Istanbul, Turkey
Win	26–8	(Sierra Leone) Sahid Kargbo	16–12	May 11, 2024	2024 World Olympic Qualification Tournament	Istanbul, Turkey
Win	25–8	(Hong Kong) Heung Tsz Hei	TF 10–0	May 11, 2024	2024 World Olympic Qualification Tournament	Istanbul, Turkey
2024 Pan American Olympic Qualification (bronze) at 65 kg
Loss	24–8	(Mexico) Austin Gomez	3–6	March 1, 2024	2024 Pan American Olympic Qualification Tournament	Acapulco, Mexico
Win	24–7	(Ecuador) Josh Kramer	TF 12–1	March 1, 2024	2024 Pan American Olympic Qualification Tournament	Acapulco, Mexico
Win	23–7	(Peru) Sixto Auccapiña	TF 10–0	March 1, 2024	2024 Pan American Olympic Qualification Tournament	Acapulco, Mexico
2023 Canada World Team Trials (gold) at 65 kg
Win	22–7	(Canada) Mike Asselstine	TF 10–0	December 15–17, 2023	2023 Canada World Team Trials	Edmonton, Canada
Win	21–7	(Canada) Mike Asselstine	7–2	December 15–17, 2023	2023 Canada World Team Trials	Edmonton, Canada
2023 World Championships 43rd at 65 kg
Loss	20–7	(Ukraine) Erik Arushanian	TF 0–10	September 18, 2023	2023 World Championships	Belgrade, Serbia
2023 Polyák Imre & Varga János Memorial 5th at 65 kg
Loss	20–6	(Kyrgyzstan) Ikromzhon Khadzhimurodov	TF 0–10	July 13–16, 2023	2023 Polyák Imre & Varga János Memorial Tournament	Budapest, Hungary
Loss	20–5	(Mongolia) Tömör-Ochiryn Tulga	TF 0–10	July 13–16, 2023	2023 Polyák Imre & Varga János Memorial Tournament	Budapest, Hungary
Win	20–4	(Kazakhstan) Akbar Kurbanov	6–4	July 13–16, 2023	2023 Polyák Imre & Varga János Memorial Tournament	Budapest, Hungary
Win	19–4	(Germany) Kizhan Clarke	5–3	July 13–16, 2023	2023 Polyák Imre & Varga János Memorial Tournament	Budapest, Hungary
2023 Grand Prix of Spain (gold) at 65 kg
Win	18–4	(Belgium) Ayub Musaev	9–5	July 7–9, 2023	2023 Grand Prix of Spain	Madrid, Spain
Win	17–4	(South Korea) Kim Sung-gwon	10–4	July 7–9, 2023	2023 Grand Prix of Spain	Madrid, Spain
Win	16–4	(Kazakhstan) Bekzat Yermekbay	TF 14–4	July 7–9, 2023	2023 Grand Prix of Spain	Madrid, Spain
Win		(Peru) Joao Benavides	FF	July 7–9, 2023	2023 Grand Prix of Spain	Madrid, Spain
2023 Stepan Sargsyan Cup 15th at 65 kg
Loss	15–4	(Iran) Peiman Biabani	4–5	June 15, 2023	2023 Stepan Sargsyan Cup	Yerevan, Armenia
2023 Canada World Team Trials (gold) at 65 kg
Win	15–3	(Canada) Jacob Alexander Torres	TF 10–0	March 9–13, 2023	2023 Canada World Team Trials	Waterloo, Canada
Win	14–3	(Canada) Hassan Al-Hayawi	TF 10–0	March 9–13, 2023	2023 Canada World Team Trials	Waterloo, Canada
Win	13–3	(Canada) Jeremy Podlog	TF 10–0	March 9–13, 2023	2023 Canada World Team Trials	Waterloo, Canada
Win	12–3	(Canada) Mike Asselstine	TF 10–0	March 9–13, 2023	2023 Canada World Team Trials	Waterloo, Canada
2022 World Championships 20th at 65 kg
Loss	11–3	(Uzbekistan) Abbos Rakhmonov	2–5	September 17, 2022	2022 World Championships	Belgrade, Serbia
2022 Commonwealth Games (silver) at 65 kg
Loss	11–2	(India) Bajrang Punia	2–9	August 5, 2022	2022 Commonwealth Games	Birmingham, England
Win	11–1	(Pakistan) Inayat Ullah	TF 11–0	August 5, 2022	2022 Commonwealth Games	Birmingham, England
Win	10–1	(Scotland) Ross Connelly	TF 10–0	August 5, 2022	2022 Commonwealth Games	Birmingham, England
2022 Grand Prix of Spain (bronze) at 65 kg
Win	9–1	(Germany) Leon Gerstenberger	TF 10–0	July 8–10, 2022	2022 Grand Prix of Spain	Madrid, Spain
Loss	8–1	(Puerto Rico) Sebastian Rivera	2–4	July 8–10, 2022	2022 Grand Prix of Spain	Madrid, Spain
Win	8–0	(Germany) Moritz Langer	TF 10–0	July 8–10, 2022	2022 Grand Prix of Spain	Madrid, Spain
Win	7–0	(United Kingdom) Ross Connelly	TF 11–0	July 8–10, 2022	2022 Grand Prix of Spain	Madrid, Spain
2022 Canada Cup (gold) at 65 kg
Win	6–0	(Jamaica) Jordan Mitchell	TF 12–1	July 2, 2022	2022 Canada Cup	Summerside, Canada
Win	5–0	(Canada) Garrett Saunders	TF 10–0	July 2, 2022	2022 Canada Cup	Summerside, Canada
Win	4–0	(South Korea) Minwoo Choi	TF 11–0	July 2, 2022	2022 Canada Cup	Summerside, Canada
2022 Canada World Team Trials (gold) at 65 kg
Win	3–0	(Canada) Jacob Alexander Torres	Fall	May 26–29, 2022	2022 Canada World Team Trials	Edmonton, Canada
Win	2–0	(Canada) Daniel Coles	TF 18–8	May 26–29, 2022	2022 Canada World Team Trials	Edmonton, Canada
Win	1–0	(Canada) Jason Reeves	TF 11–0	May 26–29, 2022	2022 Canada World Team Trials	Edmonton, Canada
