= Suraj Singh (wrestler) =

New Zealand wrestler (born 1999)

Personal information
- Born: 25 January 1999 (age 27) Tauranga, New Zealand
- Height: 1.67 m (5 ft 6 in)
- Weight: 60 kg (132 lb)

Sport
- Country: New Zealand
- Sport: Wrestling
- Club: Katikati Wildcats
Medal record
Men's freestyle wrestling
Representing New Zealand
Commonwealth Games
Bronze medal – third place	2022 Birmingham	57 kg

Suraj Singh (born 25 January 1999) is a New Zealand freestyle wrestler.

== Biography ==
Singh was born in Tauranga on 25 January 1999. He started wrestling when he was 11 years old, and wrestles for the Katikati Wildcats club in Katikati.

At the 2019 Oceania Wrestling Championships, Singh won two gold medals. He represented his county in the men's freestyle 57 kg event at the 2022 Commonwealth Games, where lost his bronze medal match against Pakistani athlete Ali Asad, but was subsequently awarded the bronze medal after Asad was disqualified for a doping violation.
