= Daniel Herrero =

French rugby union player and coach

- Born: 19 June 1948 (age 78) Puisserguier, France
- Height: 1.88 m (6 ft 2 in)
- Weight: 85 kg (187 lb)
- University: University of Nice Sophia Antipolis
- Occupation(s): Physical education teacher, author, consultant

Rugby union career
- Position: Number 8
Youth career
- RC Toulonnais
Senior career
Years	Team	Apps	(Points)
1966–1971	RC Toulonnais		
1971–1976	RRC Nice		
Coaching career
- Years: Team
- 1983–1991: RC Toulonnais
- 1992–1997: PUC

Daniel Herrero (born 19 June 1948) is a French former rugby union player and coach. He played as a Number 8 and later became a prominent coach, most notably leading RC Toulonnais to a national title in 1987.

Outside of his sports career, he is a recognized author, media consultant, and intellectual, often referred to as the "shaman" or "guru" of French rugby due to his lyrical and philosophical approach to the game. He belongs to a famous rugby family that includes his brothers André and Bernard Herrero.

== Early life ==
Daniel Herrero was born in Puisserguier, the grandson of Spanish immigrants. His father, Émile, was an agricultural worker and a prop for the local rugby club. In 1949, the family moved to La Seyne-sur-Mer in the Var for better economic opportunities and because the local rugby club sought his father's talents.

Herrero grew up in a rugby-centric household; all four brothers—André, Francis, Daniel, and Bernard—would go on to play the sport professionally.

== Playing career ==
Herrero was trained at RC Toulonnais (RCT). In 1966, he captained the French junior national team and made his debut for the Toulon first team.

His career was marked by his intellectual and rebellious nature. During the events of May 68, he was suspended from the French championship final by his club's management after being involved in a protest where a police vehicle was stoned. In 1970, he won the Challenge Yves du Manoir with Toulon. After losing the 1971 championship final to Béziers, a conflict with club management led Herrero and nine other starters, including his brother André, to leave Toulon and join RRC Nice, where he played until 1976.

From 1992 to 1997, he managed the Paris Université Club (PUC). During this time, his influence expanded into academia; he directed seminars at the École Normale Supérieure and lectured at Sciences Po and ESSEC Business School.

== Coaching and academic career ==
After retiring as a player, Herrero taught at the University of Nice until 1987.

In 1983, he returned to RC Toulon as head coach. He led the club through its "golden era" in the 1980s, winning the French Championship in 1987—the club's first title in 56 years. He also guided them to finals in 1985 and 1989.

== Personal life ==
Herrero is married and has two children: Fanny Herrero, the screenwriter and creator of the series Call My Agent! (Dix pour cent), and Manuel Herrero, a journalist and documentary filmmaker.

== Honors ==
=== As a player ===
- Challenge Yves du Manoir:
  - Winner: 1970
- French Championship:
  - Runner-up: 1971

=== As a coach ===
- French Championship:
  - Winner: 1987
  - Runner-up: 1985, 1989

== Bibliography ==
- Passion ovale (1990) ISBN 2-268-00903-3
- Rugby : des bonheurs à vivre (1995)
- Dictionnaire amoureux du rugby (2003) ISBN 2-259-19877-5
- Partir : éloge de la bougeotte (2003) ISBN 2-7103-2516-0
- L'attrape rêves (2022) ISBN 978-2-3828-4436-6
