= Puisserguier =

- Commune
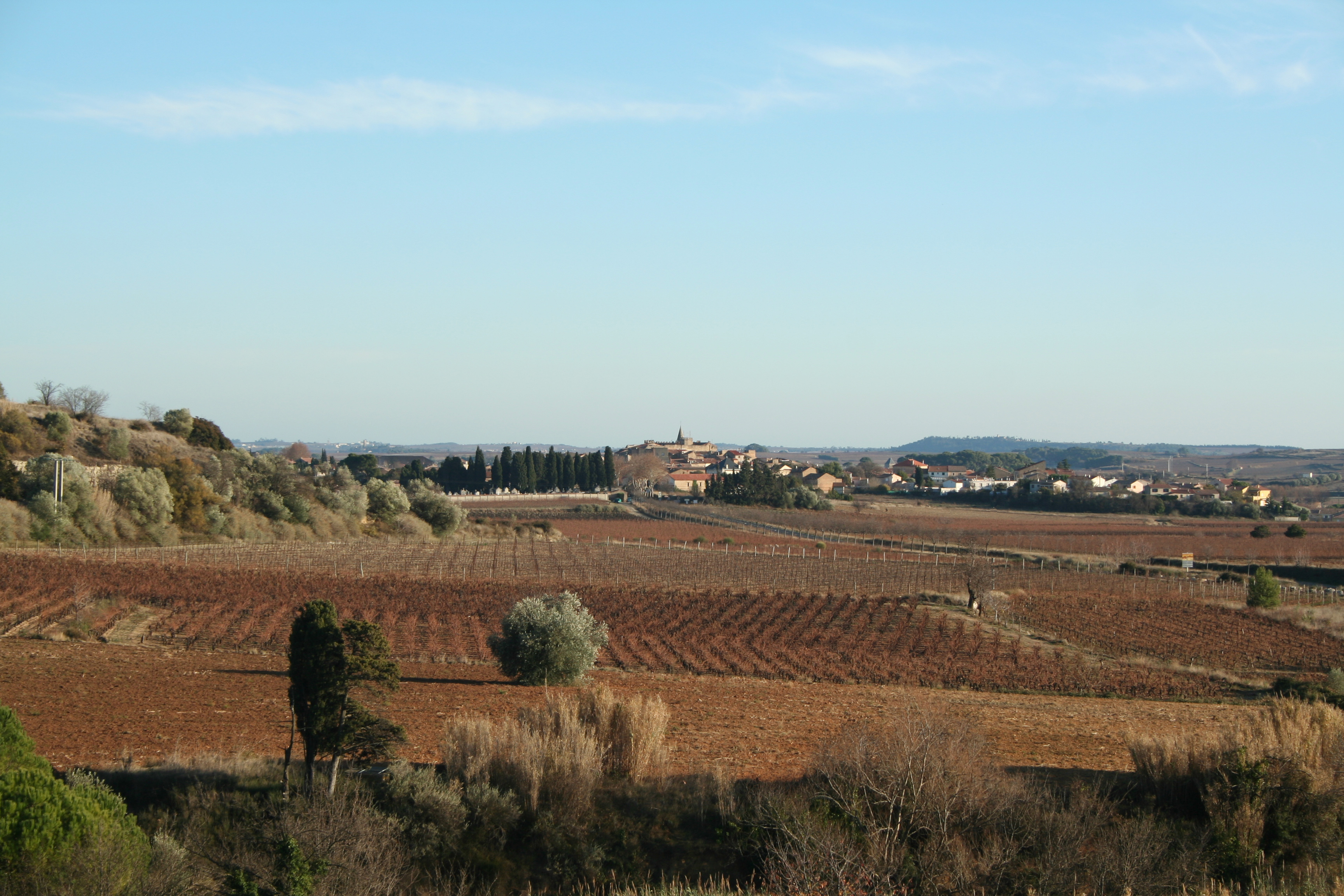
- A general view of Puisserguier

- Coat of arms
- Location of Puisserguier
- Location within France Location within Occitanie
- Coordinates: 43°22′07″N 3°02′29″E
- Country: France
- Region: Occitania
- Department: Hérault
- Arrondissement: Béziers
- Canton: Saint-Pons-de-Thomières

Government
  - Mayor (2020–2026): Jean-Noël Badenas
- Area^{1}: 28.27 km^{2} (10.92 sq mi)
- Elevation: 88 m (289 ft)
- Highest elevation: 205 m (673 ft)
- Lowest elevation: 39 m (128 ft)
- Population (2023): 3,078
  - Density: 108.9/km^{2} (282.0/sq mi)
- Time zone: UTC+01:00 (CET)
  - Summer (DST): UTC+02:00 (CEST)
- INSEE/Postal code: 34225 /34620
- ^{1} French Land Register data, which excludes lakes, ponds, glaciers > 1 km^{2} (0.386 sq mi or 247 acres) and river estuaries.

Puisserguier (French pronunciation: [pɥisɛʁɡje]; Languedocien: Puègserguièr) is a commune in the Hérault department in the Occitanie region in southern France.

== Population ==
Historical population

Year	Pop.	±% p.a.
1793	1,218	—
1800	1,175	−0.51%
1806	1,266	+1.25%
1821	1,314	+0.25%
1831	1,610	+2.05%
1836	1,670	+0.73%
1841	1,745	+0.88%
1846	1,850	+1.18%
1851	1,828	−0.24%
1856	1,990	+1.71%
1861	2,200	+2.03%
1866	2,365	+1.46%
1872	2,574	+1.42%
1876	2,806	+2.18%
1881	2,997	+1.33%
1886	3,091	+0.62%
1891	3,516	+2.61%
1896	3,759	+1.35%
1901	3,754	−0.03%

Year	Pop.	±% p.a.
1906	3,506	−1.36%
1911	3,526	+0.11%
1921	3,560	+0.10%
1926	3,451	−0.62%
1931	3,501	+0.29%
1936	3,271	−1.35%
1946	2,601	−2.27%
1954	2,512	−0.43%
1962	2,387	−0.64%
1968	2,385	−0.01%
1975	2,197	−1.17%
1982	2,219	+0.14%
1990	2,432	+1.15%
1999	2,482	+0.23%
2007	2,706	+1.09%
2012	2,867	+1.16%
2017	2,912	+0.31%
2023	3,078	+0.93%

Source: EHESS and INSEE (1968-2023)

== See also ==
- Communes of the Hérault department
