= Darthe Capellan =

Canadian freestyle wrestler (born 1996)

Personal information
- Nationality: Canadian
- Born: April 27, 1996 (age 30) Davao City, Philippines
- Home town: Surrey, British Columbia, Canada
- Height: 160 cm (5 ft 3 in)

Sport
- Country: Canada
- Sport: Wrestling
- Weight class: 57 kg
- Event: Freestyle
Medal record
Men's freestyle wrestling
Representing Canada
Commonwealth Games
Bronze medal – third place	2022 Birmingham	57 kg
Pan American Wrestling Championships
Gold medal – first place	2016 Frisco	57 kg
Pan American Games
Bronze medal – third place	2019 Lima	57 kg
Jeux de la Francophonie
Bronze medal – third place	2017 Abidjan	61 kg

Darthe Capellan (born April 27, 1996) is a Canadian freestyle wrestler. He won one of the bronze medals in the men's 57 kg event at the 2022 Commonwealth Games held in Birmingham, England. At the 2019 Pan American Games held in Lima, Peru, he won one of the bronze medals in the men's 57 kg event.

== Career ==
Capellan won the silver medal in the 50 kg event at the 2013 Canada Summer Games held in Sherbrooke, Quebec.

In 2016, Capellan won the gold medal in the 57 kg event at the 2016 Pan American Wrestling Championships held in Frisco, United States.

In 2017, he won the bronze medal in the 61 kg event at the Jeux de la Francophonie held in Abidjan, Ivory Coast. In 2018, he competed in the men's freestyle 57 kg event at the World Wrestling Championships held in Budapest, Hungary.

Capellan represented Canada at the 2019 Pan American Games in Lima, Peru in the men's freestyle 57 kg event. He lost his first match against Juan Rubelín Ramírez of the Dominican Republic but managed to win his bronze medal match against Óscar Tigreros of Colombia.

He lost his bronze medal match in his event at the 2022 Pan American Wrestling Championships held in Acapulco, Mexico. He won one of the bronze medals in the 57 kg event at the 2022 Commonwealth Games held in Birmingham, England. He competed in the 57 kg event at the 2022 World Wrestling Championships held in Belgrade, Serbia.

In 2024, Capellan competed at the Pan American Wrestling Olympic Qualification Tournament held in Acapulco, Mexico hoping to qualify for the 2024 Summer Olympics in Paris, France. He was eliminated in his first match. Capellan also competed at the 2024 World Wrestling Olympic Qualification Tournament held in Istanbul, Turkey without qualifying for the Olympics.

== Achievements ==
Year	Tournament	Location	Result	Event
2013	Canada Summer Games	Sherbrooke, Quebec	2nd	Freestyle 50 kg
2016	Pan American Wrestling Championships	Frisco, United States	1st	Freestyle 57 kg
2017	Jeux de la Francophonie	Abidjan, Ivory Coast	3rd	Freestyle 61 kg
2019	Pan American Games	Lima, Peru	3rd	Freestyle 57 kg
2022	Commonwealth Games	Birmingham, England	3rd	Freestyle 57 kg
