= Ali Asad (wrestler) =

Pakistani professional wrestler

Personal information
- Nationality: (Pakistan)
- Born: 2 September 2000 (age 26)

Sport
- Country: Pakistan
- Sport: Wrestling
- Event: Freestyle wrestling

Ali Asad (born 2 September 2000) is a Pakistani professional wrestler. He was stripped off his bronze medal at the 2022 Commonwealth Games after testing positive for performance enhancing drugs.

== Career ==
Ali lost to India's Ravi Kumar Dahiya in the semi-final of 2022 Commonwealth Games; but he managed to win a bronze medal by defeating New Zealand's Suraj Singh. However, he lost his medal after his dope test result came out to be positive. The test was conducted by the authorities before he left Pakistan to participate in the CWG.
