= Jasmit Phulka =

Canadian freestyle wrestler

- Full name: Jasmit Singh Phulka
- Weight: 74 kg (163 lb)
- Born: October 11, 1993 (age 32); Abbotsford, British Columbia, Canada
Medal record
Men's freestyle wrestling
Representing Canada
Commonwealth Games
Bronze medal – third place	2013 Johannesburg	84 kg
Bronze medal – third place	2017 Johannesburg	74 kg
Bronze medal – third place	2022 Birmingham	74 kg
Pan American Championships
Silver medal – second place	2023 Buenos Aires	79 kg
Silver medal – second place	2024 Acapulco	79 kg
Bronze medal – third place	2019 Buenos Aires	79 kg
Bronze medal – third place	2025 Monterrey	79 kg

Jasmit Singh Phulka (born October 11, 1993) is a Canadian freestyle wrestler farmer, small business owner and community advocate from Abbotsford, British Columbia. He has represented Canada internationally for more than 15 years, earning medals at major competitions including the Commonwealth Games, Pan American Championships, and multiple international tournaments. In 2018, Phulka debuted at the Senior World Wrestling Championships which was held in Budapest. Alongside his athletic career, Phulka is active in community service, youth mentorship and local philanthropy.

== Early life and career ==
Phulka was born and raised in Abbotsford, British Columbia. He is the son of Harjit Singh and Supinderjit Kaur Phulka. Phulka was born and raised in Abbotsford, British Columbia, where his family has farmed for more than 40 years. Growing up on the family farm shaped his understanding of agriculture, small business operations and the challenges facing local producers. He began wrestling at age 10, inspired by his family, including his brother Chanmit Phulka, a Pan American Champion. He won his first international gold medal at the 2010 Youth Commonwealth Championships in Singapore, where he also became the first Canadian to receive the Outstanding Youth Wrestler Award.

Jasmit Phulka's first medal in the seniors' category was in 2013 Commonwealth Wrestling Championship which was held in Johannesburg. He represented Canada in the 84 kg weight class and won bronze.

2018 was a pivotal year in his seniors' career as he won three medals. It was a gold, a silver and a bronze in the 2018 Sassari Cup, 2018 Grand Prix of Spain, and 2018 Mongolia Cup respectively. They were all in the 74 kg weight class.

Phulka won the 74-kg title at the Canadian Wrestling Trials that was conducted in December 2019.

In November 2020, Cyclone Regional Training Center announced that Phulka will be a part of them as he is training to represent Canada in the 2020 Olympics.

Phulka missed out on the chance of qualifying for the 2020 Olympics as he lost to Franklin Gomez 10–7 in the quarter final and was only able to secure the bronze medal in the 2020 Pan American Wrestling Olympic Qualification Tournament.

He competed in the 74 kg event at the 2022 World Wrestling Championships held in Belgrade, Serbia.

He won the silver medal in men's 79 kg event at the 2024 Pan American Wrestling Championships held in Acapulco, Mexico.

== Wrestling Career ==
Phulka debuted at the Senior World Wrestling Championships in 2018 and has competed internationally across Asia, Europe, and the Americas. His career highlights include:

- 2022 Commonwealth Games – Bronze (74 kg)
- 2024 & 2023 Pan American Championships – Silver (79 kg)
- 2025 Pan American Championships – Bronze (79 kg)
- 2022 Kristjan Palusalu Memorial – Bronze (74 kg)
- 2022 Canada Cup – Gold (79 kg)
- 2020 Pan Am Olympic Qualifier – Bronze (74 kg)
- Multiple podium finishes at the Canada Cup, City of Sassari Cup, Spanish Grand Prix, and Mongolia Open

He has been part of Canada’s national wrestling program for more than 15 years and has competed on the senior national team for seven. Phulka is known for advocating integrity in sport, speaking publicly against doping and emphasizing discipline, hard work, and longterm development.

== Agriculture and Small Business Work ==
In addition to his athletic career, Phulka works on his family’s farm in Abbotsford, contributing to daily operations and longterm planning. His experience in agriculture informs his understanding of food security, water access and the economic pressures facing farmers in the Fraser Valley. He also operates a small business connected to his athletic and community work, giving him firsthand insight into the challenges local entrepreneurs face.

== Community Work ==
Phulka is active in community service throughout the Lower Mainland. He has mentored atrisk South Asian youth through the Abbotsford Police Department, volunteered weekly with Canuck Place Children's Hospice, and supported BC Children’s Hospital through annual toy drives. Since 2021, his fundraising efforts have contributed more than $135,000 to Canuck Place.

During the 2021 Abbotsford floods, Phulka delivered over 500 hot meals to affected residents and supported frontline workers during the COVID19 pandemic by providing food donations to the Abbotsford Hospital. He has also volunteered with the Salvation Army, serving meals to individuals in need.

== Philanthropy and Youth Engagement ==
Through the JP74 Foundation and his annual Sports Combine, Phulka has provided more than $4,000 in youth scholarships and developed programs promoting education, sportsmanship, and resilience. He frequently speaks to youth about dedication, hard work, and overcoming adversity.

== Personal life ==
Phulka and his wife Navjit have recently become parents for the first time. He has stated that becoming a parent has strengthened his commitment to building a better community for future generations.

== Boards and Community Leadership ==
Phulka has served on several boards and committees in Abbotsford and the Fraser Valley, including:

- Abbotsford Police Foundation
- Abbotsford Chamber CYPE Council
- Character Abbotsford Council
- Sports Abbotsford
- Archway Community Services
- City of Abbotsford Agriculture Advisory Committee
- Fraser Valley IndoCanadian Business Association

These roles reflect his involvement in local governance, community development, and youth outreach.

== Awards and Recognition ==
Phulka’s athletic and community contributions have earned multiple honours, including:

- Queen Elizabeth II Platinum Jubilee Pin
- Abbotsford Sports Wall of Fame (2011)
- NCWA AllAmerican Award (2011)
- Outstanding Youth Wrestler Award, Youth Commonwealth Championships (2010)
