= Gadzhimurad Rashidov =

Russian freestyle wrestler (born 1995)

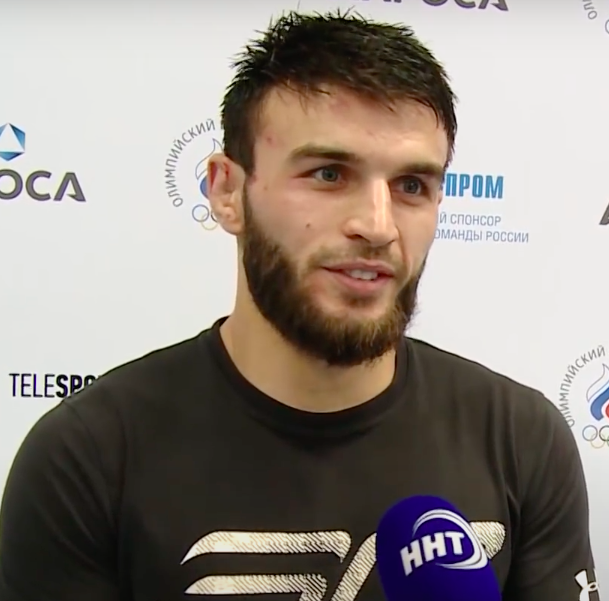
- Rashidov in 2019

Personal information
- Native name: Гаджимурад Газигандович Рашидов
- Full name: Gadzhimurad Gazigandovich Rashidov
- Nickname: All-American killer
- Born: 30 October 1995 (age 30) Gubden, Karabudakhkentsky District, Dagestan, Russia
- Height: 163 cm (5 ft 4 in)

Sport
- Country: Russia
- Sport: Wrestling
- Weight class: 65 kg
- Rank: International master of sports #1 in Russian rankings 57 kg. (until May 2016)
- Event: Freestyle
- Club: Kuramagomedov's wrestling academy
- Coached by: Gazigand Rashidov, Sadrudin Aigubov, Kuramagomed Kuramagomedov

Achievements and titles
- Olympic finals: (bronze) (2020)
- World finals: (gold) (2019) (silver) (2018) (silver) (2017)
- Regional finals: (gold) (2018) (gold) (2016)
Medal record
Men's freestyle wrestling
Representing Individual Neutral Athletes
European Championships
Silver medal – second place	2024 Bucharest	65 kg
Representing (Russia) ROC
Olympic Games
Bronze medal – third place	2020 Tokyo	65 kg
Representing Russia
World Championships
Gold medal – first place	2019 Nur-Sultan	65 kg
Silver medal – second place	2018 Budapest	61 kg
Silver medal – second place	2017 Paris	61 kg
European Championships
Gold medal – first place	2018 Kaspiysk	61 kg
Gold medal – first place	2016 Riga	57 kg
Silver medal – second place	2024 Bucharest	65 kg
World Cup
Gold medal – first place	2019 Yakutsk	65 kg
Silver medal – second place	2016 Los Angeles	57 kg
Military World Games
Gold medal – first place	2019 Wuhan	65 kg
European Nations Cup
Gold medal – first place	2015 Moscow	61 kg
European U23 Championships
Gold medal – first place	2017 Szombathely	61 kg
World Juniors Championships
Bronze medal – third place	2015 Salvador da Bahia	60 kg
Bronze medal – third place	2014 Zagreb	60 kg
World Cadets Championships
Gold medal – first place	2012 Baku	54 kg
Gold medal – first place	2011 Szombathely	50 kg
Representing Dagestan
All-Russian Spartakiad
Silver medal – second place	2022 Kazan	65 kg
Russian National Championships
Gold medal – first place	2021 Ulan-Ude	65 kg
Gold medal – first place	2020 Naro-Fominsk	65 kg
Gold medal – first place	2019 Sochi	65 kg
Gold medal – first place	2017 Nazran	61 kg
Golden Grand Prix Ivan Yarygin
Gold medal – first place	2018 Krasnoyarsk	61 kg
Silver medal – second place	2023 Krasnoyarsk	65 kg
Silver medal – second place	2017 Krasnoyarsk	61 kg
Bronze medal – third place	2019 Krasnoyarsk	65 kg
Bronze medal – third place	2016 Krasnoyarsk	57 kg

Gadzhimurad Gazigandovich Rashidov (Russian: Гаджимурад Газигандович Рашидов, IPA: [ɡəd͡ʐʐɨmʊˈrat rɐˈʂɨdəf], Dargin: Гъазиганла урши ХӀяжимурад; born 30 October 1995) is a Russian freestyle wrestler who competes at 65 kilograms. He is the 2019 World Champion (finalist in 2017 and 2018) and the 2020 and three-time Russian National Champion. 2020 Summer Olympics bronze medalist at 65 kg.

Nicknamed the All-American killer, Rashidov holds an undefeated 5–0 record against American wrestlers, who combined have earned 19 All-American honors and 10 NCAA Division I National titles. He also holds wins over 11 different World and Olympic champions.

== Background ==
Rashidov was born and raised in the Gubden village, Dagestan. He started wrestling at the age of six at his home, under his father.

After finishing high school in 2011, he moved to Kaspiysk, and started training at Gamidov's Wrestling Academy, in Makhachkala. As the trips from his house to the school were too long, he switched to Kuramagomedov's wrestling academy, which is located in Kaspiysk, under Said Gireyev and his father.

== Career ==
=== Age-group ===
Rashidov was a two-time Cadet World Champion in 2011 and 2012, and a two-time Junior World Championship silver medalist, in 2014 and 2015.

=== Senior level ===
==== 2012-2015 ====
Rashidov made his senior freestyle debut in 2012, when he placed third at the Ali Aliev Memorial International. In 2015, after placing fifth at the Ivan Yarygin Grand Prix, Rashidov claimed a bronze medal at the Russian Nationals, and then went on to help the Russian Team win gold at the European Nations Cup.

==== 2016 ====
To start off the year, Rashidov dropped down from 61 to 57 kilograms, and claimed a bronze medal from the Ivan Yarygin Grand Prix in January. He then became the '16 European Champion, racking up wins over Asadulla Lachinau and two-time Cadet World Champion Andriy Yatsenko. On May, he competed at the Russian Nationals, where after defeating '14 Junior World Champion Azamat Tuskaev, the Dagestan National Team decided to withdraw all the Dagestani wrestlers from the championship, after frustration due to the final decision regarding the conflict between Viktor Lebedev and Ismail Musukaev, which led to a forfeit from Rashidov.

=== 2017 World Wrestling Championships ===
After defeats over Viktor Rassadin of Sakha-Yakutia at the 2017 Russian National Freestyle Wrestling Championships, he competed at the 2017 World Championships in Paris. His first opponent was Jozsef Molnar of Hungary; Rashidov beat him by technical fall (11-0). In the round of eight, he won 11–0 over NCAA four-time champion from Ohio State Logan Stieber. In the quarterfinal, he rematched World and Olympic champion Vladimer Khinchegashvili of Georgia and beat him by the score, 6–3. In the semifinal Rashidov faced with his countryman from Krasnoyarsk, Opan Sat. Rashidov won the wrestling match (8-2). In the gold medal match, Rashidov lost to three-times world champion from Azerbaijan, Haji Aliyev, by pinfall.

=== 2018 European Wrestling Championships ===
Rashidov won European world team trials at the Ivan Yarygin 2018 and represented the Russian team at 61 kilos at the 2018 European Wrestling Championships. His first opponent was Vladimir Burukov of Ukraine, he won the match within a minute. In the second round he beat his countryman from Sakha Republic who represent the Belarus Nurgun Skryabin. In semifinals, he faced Recep Topal of Turkey and beat him by the score, 4–0. In the gold medal match, he beat Beka Lomtadze of Georgia and won the second European title in his career.

=== 2018 World Wrestling Championships ===
Rashidov made Russia World Team Member and competed at the World Wrestling Championships in Budapest, Hungary. His first opponent in men's freestyle at 61 kilos was Tümenbilegiin Tüvshintulga of Mongolia where Rashidov won in close match by score 2–1. In the quarterfinals, Rashidov faced Indian national champion Sonba Tanaji Gongane, the wrestling match finished by technical superiority by Rashidov (12-0). In the semifinals, Rashdidov faced Beka Lomtadze and beat him by technical superiority (10-0). In the gold medal match he lost by 6–5 to Yowlys Bonne of Cuba.

=== Ivan Yarygin 2019 and new weight class ===
Rashidov decided to compete at 65 kilos for the 2020 Olympic cycle, at Yarygin 2019 in the warm-up he got hand injury, in the first match he faced American folkstyle superstar and NCAA 3-time champion Zain Retherford of Penn State. He won the match by score (4-3), then he faced 2-time world bronze medalist Akhmed Chakaev of Chechnya and lost. For bronze medal match Rashidov faced Cristian Lopez of Cuba and won the match by score (2-1).

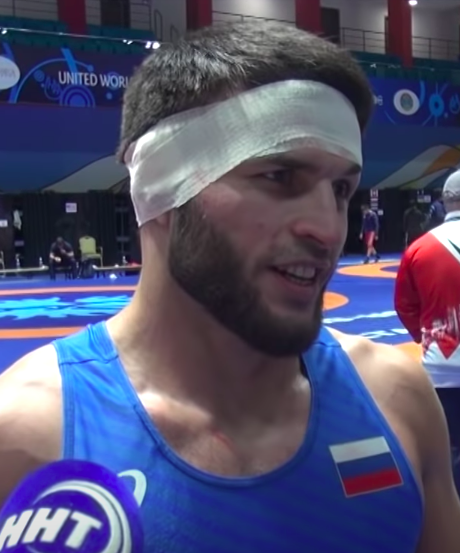
Rashidov after winning the World Championships.

He made his debut at the World Championships 2019 in his new weight of class of 65 kg, in the first round he beat Haji Aliyev of Azerbaijan - in a rematch of the 2017 World Wrestling Championships' final at 61 kg - by score (4-2). In the quarterfinal, he beat his teammate Gadzhimurad Aliev (Haji Mohamad Ali) by score (9-0), in the semifinal he beat his countryman Iszmail Muszukajev in a close match (3-2), in the final match he defeated Daulet Niyazbekov of Kazakhstan and won the gold medal. At the 2020 Summer Olympics he earned the bronze medal and was runner-up at the 2024 European Championships.

== Championships and achievements ==
- Senior level:
  - 2015 Russian Nationals bronze medalist – 61 kg
  - Golden Grand Prix Ivan Yarygin 2016 bronze medalist – 57 kg
  - 2016 European Wrestling Championships gold medalist – 57 kg
  - 2016 Russian Nationals 11th – 57 kg
  - 2016 World Cup silver medalist – 57 kg
  - 2016 Yusup Abdusalamov international winner – 65 kg
  - Golden Grand Prix Ivan Yarygin 2017 runner-up – 61 kg
  - 2017 U23 European Championship gold medalist – 61 kg
  - 2018 Golden Grand Prix Ivan Yarygin 2018 winner – 61 kg
  - 2018 European Wrestling Championships gold medalist – 61 kg
  - Golden Grand Prix Ivan Yarygin 2019 3rd – 65 kg
  - 2019 World Wrestling Championships 1st – 65 kg
  - 2020 Summer Olympics 3rd – 65 kg
  - 2024 European Championships 2nd – 65 kg

== Freestyle record ==
International Freestyle Matches
Res.	Record	Opponent	Score	Date	Event	Location
2024 European Championships (silver) at 65 kg
Loss	92–13	(Albania) Islam Dudaev	1–2	16–17 February 2024	2024 European Championships	Bucharest, Romania
Won	92–12	(Georgia (country)) Goderdzi Dzebisashvili	12–1	16–17 February 2024	2024 European Championships	Bucharest, Romania
Win	91–11	(Armenia) Vazgen Tevanyan	5–4	16–17 February 2024	2024 European Championships	Bucharest, Romania
Win	90–11	(Germany) Andre Clarke	6–0	16–17 February 2024	2024 European Championships	Bucharest, Romania
2020 Summer Olympics (bronze) at 65 kg
Win	89–12	(Hungary) Iszmail Muszukajev	5–0	6–7 August 2021	2020 Summer Olympics	Tokyo, Japan
Loss	88–12	(Japan) Takuto Otoguro	2–3	6–7 August 2021	2020 Summer Olympics	Tokyo, Japan
Win	88–11	(Poland) Magomedmurad Gadzhiev	6–2	6–7 August 2021	2020 Summer Olympics	Tokyo, Japan
Win	87–11	(Armenia) Vazgen Tevanyan	6–0	6–7 August 2021	2020 Summer Olympics	Tokyo, Japan
2021 Sassari City International (gold) at 70 kg
Win	86–11	(Russia) Ildus Giniyatullin	TF	19 June 2021	2021 Sassari City International	Sassari, Italy
Win	85–11	(Spain) Saul Bello Alvarez	TF 10–0	19 June 2021	2021 Sassari City International	Sassari, Italy
2021 Russian Nationals (gold) at 65 kg
Win	84–11	(Dagestan) Zagir Shakhiev	5–3	13–14 March 2021	2021 Russian National Championships	Ulan-Ude, Russia
Win	83–11	(Dagestan) Ramazan Ferzaliev	2–2	13–14 March 2021	2021 Russian National Championships	Ulan-Ude, Russia
Win	82–11	(Dagestan) Murshid Mutalimov	TF 11–0	13–14 March 2021	2021 Russian National Championships	Ulan-Ude, Russia
Win	81–11	(Dagestan) Abdulmazhid Kudiev	2–0	13–14 March 2021	2021 Russian National Championships	Ulan-Ude, Russia
Win	80–11	(Sakha Republic) Konstantin Kaprynov	TF 11–0	13–14 March 2021	2021 Russian National Championships	Ulan-Ude, Russia
2020 Individual World Cup 11th at 65 kg
Loss		(Azerbaijan) Haji Aliyev	INJ	17 December 2020	2020 Individual World Cup	Belgrade, Serbia
2020 Russian Nationals (gold) at 65 kg
Win	79–11	(Chechnya) Akhmed Chakaev	2–0	16–18 October 2020	2020 Russian National Championships	Naro-Fominsk, Russia
Win	78–11	(Chechnya) Muslim Sadulaev	6–0	16–18 October 2020	2020 Russian National Championships	Naro-Fominsk, Russia
Win	77–11	(North Ossetia–Alania) Alan Gogaev	2–1	16–18 October 2020	2020 Russian National Championships	Naro-Fominsk, Russia
2019 Military World Games (gold) at 65 kg
Win	76–11	(Ukraine) Vasyl Shuptar	TF 10–0	21–24 October 2019	2019 Military World Games	Wuhan, China
Win	75–11	(Kazakhstan) Baurzhan Torebek	TF 10–0	21–24 October 2019	2019 Military World Games	Wuhan, China
Win	74–11	(China) Tian Zhenguang	TF 11–0	21–24 October 2019	2019 Military World Games	Wuhan, China
Win	73–11	(Turkmenistan) Gerchek Hemraev	TF 10–0	21–24 October 2019	2019 Military World Games	Wuhan, China
2019 World Championships (gold) at 65 kg
Win	72–11	(Kazakhstan) Daulet Niyazbekov	TF 11–0	19–20 September 2019	2019 World Championships	Nur-Sultan, Kazakhstan
Win	71–11	(Hungary) Ismail Musukaev	3–2	19–20 September 2019	2019 World Championships	Nur-Sultan, Kazakhstan
Win	70–11	(Brunei) Haji Mohamad Ali	9–0	19–20 September 2019	2019 World Championships	Nur-Sultan, Kazakhstan
Win	69–11	(Japan) Takuto Otoguro	8–1	19–20 September 2019	2019 World Championships	Nur-Sultan, Kazakhstan
Win	68–11	(Egypt) Amr Reda Hussen	5–3	19–20 September 2019	2019 World Championships	Nur-Sultan, Kazakhstan
Win	67–11	(Azerbaijan) Haji Aliyev	4–2	19–20 September 2019	2019 World Championships	Nur-Sultan, Kazakhstan
2019 Russian Nationals (gold) at 65 kg
Win	66–11	(Tuva) Nachyn Kuular	5–3	5–7 July 2019	2019 Russian National Championships	Sochi, Russia
Win	65–11	(Dagestan) Murshid Mutalimov	3–1	5–7 July 2019	2019 Russian National Championships	Sochi, Russia
Win	64–11	(Sakha Republic) Aisen Potapov	6–0	5–7 July 2019	2019 Russian National Championships	Sochi, Russia
Win	63–11	(Karachay-Cherkessia) Azor Ionov	TF 10–0	5–7 July 2019	2019 Russian National Championships	Sochi, Russia
Win	62–11	(Khakassia) Vitaly Kanzychakov	5–0	5–7 July 2019	2019 Russian National Championships	Sochi, Russia
2019 World Cup (gold) at 65 kg
Win	61–11	(Japan) Daichi Takatani	TF 10–0	16–17 March 2019	2019 World Cup	Yakutsk, Russia
2019 Ivan Yarygin Golden Grand Prix (bronze) at 65 kg
Win	60–11	(Cuba) Cristian Solenzal	2–1	24–27 January 2019	Golden Grand Prix Ivan Yarygin 2019	Krasnoyarsk, Russia
Loss	59–11	(Chechnya) Akhmed Chakaev	2–3	24–27 January 2019	Golden Grand Prix Ivan Yarygin 2019	Krasnoyarsk, Russia
Win	59–10	(United States) Zain Retherford	4–3	24–27 January 2019	Golden Grand Prix Ivan Yarygin 2019	Krasnoyarsk, Russia
2018 World Championships (silver) at 61 kg
Loss	58–10	(Cuba) Yowlys Bonne	5–6	20–21 October 2018	2018 World Championships	Budapest, Hungary
Win	58–9	(Georgia (country)) Beka Lomtadze	TF 10–0	20–21 October 2018	2018 World Championships	Budapest, Hungary
Win	57–9	(India) Sonba Tanaji Gongane	TF 12–0	20–21 October 2018	2018 World Championships	Budapest, Hungary
Win	56–9	(Hungary) Tümenbilegiin Tüvshintulga	2–1	20–21 October 2018	2018 World Championships	Budapest, Hungary
2018 Poland Open (gold) at 61 kg
Win	55–9	(Kazakhstan) Kuat Amirtayev	5–0	7–9 September 2018	2018 Poland Open	Warsaw, Poland
Win	54–9	(Russia) Magomedrasul Idrisov	2–1	7–9 September 2018	2018 Poland Open	Warsaw, Poland
Win	53–9	(United States) Cory Clark	TF 11–0	7–9 September 2018	2018 Poland Open	Warsaw, Poland
Win	52–9	(Japan) Yo Nakata	6–2	7–9 September 2018	2018 Poland Open	Warsaw, Poland
2018 European Championships (gold) at 61 kg
Win	51–9	(Georgia (country)) Beka Lomtadze	4–1	5–6 May 2018	2018 European Continental Championships	Kaspiysk, Russia
Win	50–9	(Turkey) Recep Topal	4–0	5–6 May 2018	2018 European Continental Championships	Kaspiysk, Russia
Win	49–9	(Belarus) Niurgun Skriabin	10–1	5–6 May 2018	2018 European Continental Championships	Kaspiysk, Russia
Win	48–9	(Ukraine) Volodymyr Burukov	TF 10–0	5–6 May 2018	2018 European Continental Championships	Kaspiysk, Russia
2018 Dan Kolov - Nikola Petrov Memorial (gold) at 65 kg
Win	47–9	(Ukraine) Vasyl Shuptar	9–1	22–25 March 2018	2018 Dan Kolov – Nikola Petrov Memorial	Sofia, Bulgaria
Win	46–9	(Bulgaria) Filip Novachkov	TF 11–0	22–25 March 2018	2018 Dan Kolov – Nikola Petrov Memorial	Sofia, Bulgaria
Win	45–9	(Turkey) Utku Doğan	11–2	22–25 March 2018	2018 Dan Kolov – Nikola Petrov Memorial	Sofia, Bulgaria
Win	44–9	(Ukraine) Hor Ohannesian	6–2	22–25 March 2018	2018 Dan Kolov – Nikola Petrov Memorial	Sofia, Bulgaria
2018 Ivan Yarygin Golden Grand Prix (gold) at 61 kg
Win	43–9	(Kabardino-Balkaria) Ismail Musukaev	3–2	26 January 2018	Golden Grand Prix Ivan Yarygin 2018	Krasnoyarsk, Russia
Win	42–9	(Buryatia) Aleksandr Bogomoev	2–0	26 January 2018	Golden Grand Prix Ivan Yarygin 2018	Krasnoyarsk, Russia
Win	41–9	(United States) Tony Ramos	TF 11–0	26 January 2018	Golden Grand Prix Ivan Yarygin 2018	Krasnoyarsk, Russia
2017 World Championships (silver) at 61 kg
Loss	40–9	(Azerbaijan) Haji Aliyev	Fall	25 August 2017	2017 World Championships	Paris, France
Win	40–8	(Turkey) Cengizhan Erdoğan	8–2	25 August 2017	2017 World Championships	Paris, France
Win	39–8	(Georgia (country)) Vladimer Khinchegashvili	6–3	25 August 2017	2017 World Championships	Paris, France
Win	38–8	(United States) Logan Stieber	TF 11–0	25 August 2017	2017 World Championships	Paris, France
Win	37–8	(Hungary) József Molnár	TF 11–0	25 August 2017	2017 World Championships	Paris, France
2017 Russian Nationals (gold) at 61 kg
Win	36–8	(Sakha Republic) Viktor Rassadin	3–3	12 June 2017	2017 Russian National Championships	Nazran, Russia
Win	35–8	(Chechnya) Akhmed Chakaev	11–8	12 June 2017	2017 Russian National Championships	Nazran, Russia
Win	34–8	(Chechnya) Bekkhan Goygereyev	2–1	12 June 2017	2017 Russian National Championships	Nazran, Russia
Win	33–8	(Sakha Republic) Niurgun Skriabin	3–0	12 June 2017	2017 Russian National Championships	Nazran, Russia
Win	32–8	(Dagestan) Shamil Guseinov	5–0	12 June 2017	2017 Russian National Championships	Nazran, Russia
2017 U23 European Championships (gold) at 61 kg
Win	31–8	(Turkey) Sedat Özdemir	TF 10–0	28 March – 2 April 2017	2017 U23 European Continental Championships	Szombathely, Hungary
Win	30–8	(Azerbaijan) Ali Rahimzade	4–2	28 March – 2 April 2017	2017 U23 European Continental Championships	Szombathely, Hungary
Win	29–8	(Hungary) Robert Kardos	TF 10–0	28 March – 2 April 2017	2017 U23 European Continental Championships	Szombathely, Hungary
Win	28–8	(Switzerland) Randy Vock	TF 10–0	28 March – 2 April 2017	2017 U23 European Continental Championships	Szombathely, Hungary
2017 Ivan Yarygin Golden Grand Prix (silver) at 61 kg
Loss	27–8	(Chechnya) Akhmed Chakaev	2–2	28 January 2017	Golden Grand Prix Ivan Yarygin 2017	Krasnoyarsk, Russia
Win	27–7	(Buryatia) Bulat Batoev	TF 12–2	28 January 2017	Golden Grand Prix Ivan Yarygin 2017	Krasnoyarsk, Russia
Win	26–7	(Chechnya) Bekkhan Goygereyev	8–0	28 January 2017	Golden Grand Prix Ivan Yarygin 2017	Krasnoyarsk, Russia
Win	25–7	(Sakha Republic) Niurgun Skriabin	4–1	28 January 2017	Golden Grand Prix Ivan Yarygin 2017	Krasnoyarsk, Russia
Win	24–7	(United States) Cody Brewer	TF 12–1	28 January 2017	Golden Grand Prix Ivan Yarygin 2017	Krasnoyarsk, Russia
Win	23–7	(Japan) Rei Higuchi	3–1	28 January 2017	Golden Grand Prix Ivan Yarygin 2017	Krasnoyarsk, Russia
2016 Yusup Abdusalamov Memorial (gold) at 65 kg
Win	22–7	(Russia) Shikhsaid Jalilov		22–23 October 2016	2016 Yusup Abdusalamov Memorial	Russia
Win	21–7	(Russia)		22–23 October 2016	2016 Yusup Abdusalamov Memorial	Russia
2016 World Cup DNP at 57 kg
Loss	20–7	(Iran) Hassan Rahimi	3–3	11–12 June 2016	2016 World Cup	(United States) Los Angeles, California
Win	20–6	(Turkey) Süleyman Atlı	10–4	11–12 June 2016	2016 World Cup	(United States) Los Angeles, California
Loss	19–6	(Georgia (country)) Vladimer Khinchegashvili	2–3	11–12 June 2016	2016 World Cup	(United States) Los Angeles, California
2016 Russian Nationals 11th at 57 kg
Loss		(Buryatia) Aldar Balzhinimayev	FF	27 May 2016	2016 Russian National Championships	Yakutsk, Russia
Win	19–5	(Sakha Republic) Nikolay Okhlopkov	6–2	27 May 2016	2016 Russian National Championships	Yakutsk, Russia
Win	18–5	(North Ossetia–Alania) Azamat Tuskaev	5–3	27 May 2016	2016 Russian National Championships	Yakutsk, Russia
2016 European Championships (gold) at 57 kg
Win	17–5	(Ukraine) Andriy Yatsenko	8–2	8 March 2016	2016 European Continental Championships	Riga, Latvia
Win	16–5	(Russia) Asadulla Lachinau	6–0	8 March 2016	2016 European Continental Championships	Riga, Latvia
Win	15–5	(Belarus) Georgi Vangelov	TF 10–0	8 March 2016	2016 European Continental Championships	Riga, Latvia
Win	14–5	(Spain) Levan Metreveli Vartanov	TF 10–0	8 March 2016	2016 European Continental Championships	Riga, Latvia
Win	13–5	(Israel) Yuriy Holub	TF 10–0	8 March 2016	2016 European Continental Championships	Riga, Latvia
2016 Ivan Yarygin Golden Grand Prix (bronze) at 57 kg
Win	12–5	(Russia) Vladimir Flegontov	2–1	27–29 January 2016	Golden Grand Prix Ivan Yarygin 2016	Krasnoyarsk, Russia
Loss	11–5	(Russia) Aleksandr Bogomoev	1–1	27–29 January 2016	Golden Grand Prix Ivan Yarygin 2016	Krasnoyarsk, Russia
Win	11–4	(Russia) Donduk-ool Khuresh-ool	12–3	27–29 January 2016	Golden Grand Prix Ivan Yarygin 2016	Krasnoyarsk, Russia
Win	10–4	(Russia) Viktor Rassadin	3–2	27–29 January 2016	Golden Grand Prix Ivan Yarygin 2016	Krasnoyarsk, Russia
Win	9–4	(Russia) Nyurgun Aleksandrov	6–1	27–29 January 2016	Golden Grand Prix Ivan Yarygin 2016	Krasnoyarsk, Russia
2015 European Nations Cup (gold) for Team RUS at 61 kg
Win	8–4	(Turkey) Münir Recep Aktaş	TF	6–8 November 2015	2015 Open Cup of European Nations, Alrosa Cup	Moscow, Russia
2015 Russian Nationals (bronze) at 61 kg
Win	7–4	(Buryatia) Bato Badmaev	3–2	8–10 May 2015	2015 Russian National Championships	Kaspiysk, Russia
Loss	6–4	(Irkutsk Oblast) Aleksandr Bogomoev	0–5	8–10 May 2015	2015 Russian National Championships	Kaspiysk, Russia
Win	6–3	(Dagestan) Shamil Omarov	Fall	8–10 May 2015	2015 Russian National Championships	Kaspiysk, Russia
Win	5–3	(Sakha Republic) Niurgun Skriabin	6–3	8–10 May 2015	2015 Russian National Championships	Kaspiysk, Russia
Win	4–3	(Buryatia) Dasha Sharastepanov	6–0	8–10 May 2015	2015 Russian National Championships	Kaspiysk, Russia
2015 Ivan Yarygin Golden Grand Prix 5th at 61 kg
Loss	3–3	(Russia) Dzhamal Otarsultanov	6–8	22–26 January 2015	Golden Grand Prix Ivan Yarygin 2015	Krasnoyarsk, Russia
Win	3–2	(Iran) Arash Dangesaraki	TF 10–0	22–26 January 2015	Golden Grand Prix Ivan Yarygin 2015	Krasnoyarsk, Russia
Loss	2–2	(Russia) Aleksandr Bogomoev	0–3	22–26 January 2015	Golden Grand Prix Ivan Yarygin 2015	Krasnoyarsk, Russia
Win	2–1	(Russia) Vladimir Flegontov	9–1	22–26 January 2015	Golden Grand Prix Ivan Yarygin 2015	Krasnoyarsk, Russia
Win	1–1	(Russia) Soslan Aziev	TF 12–0	22–26 January 2015	Golden Grand Prix Ivan Yarygin 2015	Krasnoyarsk, Russia
2014 Ali Aliev Memorial 15th at 61 kg
Loss	0–1	(Russia) Rustam Abdurashidov	3–5	24–25 May 2014	2014 Ali Aliev Memorial	Makhachkala, Russia
