= Russian National Freestyle 2017 – Men's freestyle 61 kg =

The men's freestyle 61 kg is a competition featured at the 2017 Russian National Freestyle Wrestling Championships, and was held in Nazran, Ingushetia, Russia on June 12.

== Medalists ==
Gold	(Dagestan) Gadzhimurad Rashidov
Silver	(Yakutia) Viktor Rassadin
Bronze	(Chechnya) Islam Dudaev
Bronze	(Chechnya) Bekkhan Goygereyev

== Background ==
2015 57 kg Yarygin and national runner-up Ismail Musukaev is injury, 2015 European Games champion Alexander Bogomoev (neck injury, than stabbed in a bar fight). Dzhamal Otarsultanov missed weight and will likely be unable to compete, pending a final decision by the Russian Federation. In a day competition Russian federation didn't let Dzhamal Otarsultanov competes at the 61 kilos division. Also, Akhmed Chakaev missed weight too, but Federation allowed him to competing.

== Results ==
Legend

- F — Won by fall
- WO — Won by walkover

=== Finals ===
Semifinals		Final
(Republic of Crimea (Russia)) Shamil Omarov	0
(Yakutia) Viktor Rassadin	10	(Yakutia) Viktor Rassadin	3
(Dagestan) Gadzhimurad Rashidov	11	(Dagestan) Gadzhimurad Rashidov	3
(Chechnya) Akhmed Chakaev	8

=== Top half ===
==== Section 1 ====
Round of 64

Round of 32
(North Ossetia–Alania) Artur Badtiev
(Bryansk Oblast) Nodar Arabidzhe	bye
(Chuvashia) Nikolay Okhlopkov	2
(Republic of Crimea (Russia)) Shamil Omarov	12
(Yakutia) Eduard Grigoriev	10
(Yakutia) Nikolay Okhlopkov	6
(Oryol Oblast) Maksim Egorchkin	2
(Yakutia) Egor Ponamorev	6

Round of 16
(North Ossetia–Alania) Artur Badtiev	4
(Republic of Crimea (Russia)) Shamil Omarov	5
(Yakutia) Eduard Grigoriev	3
(Yakutia) Egor Ponamorev	2

Quarterfinals
(Republic of Crimea (Russia)) Shamil Omarov	3
(Yakutia) Eduard Grigoriev	1

==== Section 2 ====
Round of 64

Round of 32
(North Ossetia–Alania) Chermen Tavitov	15
(Khakassia) Aleksey Medvedev	10
(Dagestan) Rustam Adburashidov	2
(Yakutia) Viktor Rassadin	12
(Buryatia) Bayar Tsyrenov	9
(Dagestan) Shamil Rashidov	7
(Chechnya) Islam Dudaev	8
(Abkhazia) Rustam Ampar	5

Round of 16
(North Ossetia–Alania) Chermen Tavitov	1
(Yakutia) Viktor Rassadin	11
(Buryatia) Bayar Tsyrenov	7
(Chechnya) Islam Dudaev	10

Quarterfinals
(Yakutia) Viktor Rassadin	12
(Chechnya) Islam Dudaev	4

=== Bottom half ===
==== Section 3 ====
Round of 64

Round of 32
(Dagestan) Shamil Guseinov	0
(Dagestan) Gadzhimurad Rashidov	5
(Yakutia) Nurgun Skryabin	10
(Bryansk Oblast) Ziyavuddin Gereev	0
(Krasnodar Krai) Amayak Khalstyan	0
(Chechnya) Bekkhan Goygereyev	12
(Yakutia) Vyacheslav Efremov	4
(Tuva) Ondar Ia-Khaan	2

Round of 16
(Dagestan) Gadzhimurad Rashidov	3
(Yakutia) Nurgun Skryabin	0
(Chechnya) Bekkhan Goygereyev	5
(Yakutia) Vyacheslav Efremov	0

Quarterfinals
(Dagestan) Gadzhimurad Rashidov	2
(Chechnya) Bekkhan Goygereyev	1

==== Section 4 ====
Round of 64
(Buryatia) Budzhanaev Erdem	1
(Moscow Oblast) Osman Dzhrguliya	10
(Khanty-Mansi Autonomous Okrug) Vadim Bekoev	2
(Chechnya) Akhmed Chakaev	12

Round of 32
(Saint Petersburg) Magomderasul Magomedov	12
(Saint Petersburg) Shamil Rasulov	2
(Irkutsk Oblast) Dmitriy Zintoev	0
(Moscow Oblast) Rustam Karakhanov	10
(Yakutia) Nurgun Aleksandrov	0
(Dagestan) Gadzhimagomed Aliev	10
(Moscow Oblast) Osman Dzhrguliya	3
(Chechnya) Akhmed Chakaev	10

Round of 16
(Saint Petersburg) Magomderasul Magomedov	1
(Moscow Oblast) Rustam Karakhanov	7
(Dagestan) Gadzhimagomed Aliev	6
(Chechnya) Akhmed Chakaev	8

Quarterfinals
(Moscow Oblast) Rustam Karakhanov	0
(Chechnya) Akhmed Chakaev	10

=== Repechage ===
Repechage round 1
(Dagestan) Rustam Adburashidov	bye
(North Ossetia–Alania) Chermen Tavitov
(Dagestan) Shamil Guseinov	1
(Yakutia) Nurgun Skryabin	13

Repechage round 2
(North Ossetia–Alania) Chermen Tavitov	0
(Chechnya) Islam Dudaev	10
(Yakutia) Nurgun Skryabin	3
(Chechnya) Bekkhan Goygereyev	7

Bronze medals
(Chechnya) Islam Dudaev	6
(Republic of Crimea (Russia)) Shamil Omarov	5
(Chechnya) Bekkhan Goygereyev	7
(Chechnya) Akhmed Chakaev	2
