= Golden Grand Prix Ivan Yarygin 2017 – Men's freestyle 61 kg =

The men's freestyle 61 kg is a competition featured at the Golden Grand Prix Ivan Yarygin 2017, and was held in Krasnoyarsk, Russia on January 28.

== Medalists ==
| Gold | (Dagestan) Akhmed Chakaev |
| Silver | (Dagestan) Gadzhimurad Rashidov |
| Bronze | (Japan) Rei Higuchi |
| Bronze | (Sakha Republic) Viktor Rassadin |

== Results ==
Legend

- F — Won by fall
- WO — Won by walkover

=== Finals ===
| Semifinals | | Final |
| (Chechnya) Akhmed Chakaev | 3 |
| (Tuva) Nachyn Kuular | 0 | (Chechnya) Akhmed Chakaev | 2 |
| (Buryatia) Bulat Batoev | 2 | (Dagestan) Gadzhimurad Rashidov | 2 |
| (Dagestan) Gadzhimurad Rashidov | 12 |

=== Top half ===
==== Section 1 ====
Round of 64

Round of 32
(Chechnya) Arbi Abakarov | 4
(Uzbekistan) Abbas Rakhmonov | 5
(Chechnya) Akhmed Chakaev | 10
(Kazakhstan) Artas Sanaa | 0
(Buryatia) Dasha Sharastepanov | 2
(Sakha Republic) Viktor Rassadin | 3
(Khakassia) Aleksey Medvedev | 5
(Sakha Republic) Revoli Samsonov | 0

Round of 16
(Uzbekistan) Abbas Rakhmonov | 0
(Chechnya) Akhmed Chakaev | 11
(Sakha Republic) Viktor Rassadin | 5
(Khakassia) Aleksey Medvedev | 2

Quarterfinals
(Chechnya) Akhmed Chakaev | 13
(Sakha Republic) Viktor Rassadin | 2

==== Section 2 ====
Round of 64

Round of 32
(Dagestan) Shamil Rashidov | 8
(Germany) Manuel Wolfer | 0
(Chechnya) Islam Dudaev | 6
(Tuva) Nachyn Kuular | 8
(Belarus) Andrey Bekrenev | 3
(Mongolia) Nemehbayar Batsaikhan | 0
(Sakha Republic) Nikolay Okhlopkov | 0
(Sakha Republic) Egor Ponomarev | 4

Round of 16
(Dagestan) Shamil Rashidov | 8
(Tuva) Nachyn Kuular | 10
(Belarus) Andrey Bekrenev | 1
(Sakha Republic) Egor Ponomarev | 3^{F}

Quarterfinals
(Tuva) Nachyn Kuular | 11
(Sakha Republic) Egor Ponomarev | 0

=== Bottom half ===
==== Section 3 ====
Round of 64

Round of 32
(North Ossetia–Alania) Uruzbek Tsurmatov | 9
(Buryatia) Bayar Tsyrenov | 10
(Dagestan) Rustam Abdurashidov | 6
(Kazakhstan) Timur Aitkulov | 9
(Sakha Republic) Vyacheslav Efremov | 10
(Buryatia) Bulat Batoev | 12
(Abkhazia) Osman Dzhigelia | 11
(Iran) Iman Sadeghikoukandeh | 0

Round of 16
(Buryatia) Bayar Tsyrenov | 3
(Kazakhstan) Timur Aitkulov | 1
(Buryatia) Bulat Batoev | 3
(Abkhazia) Osman Dzhigelia | 1

Quarterfinals
(Buryatia) Bayar Tsyrenov | 0
(Buryatia) Bulat Batoev | 4

==== Section 4 ====
Round of 64
(Dagestan) Murshid Mutalimov | 5
(Uzbekistan) Timirjon Usmonohunov | 0
(Oklahoma) Cody Brewer | 6
(Chechnya) Usman Shakhgiriev | 2
(Dagestan) Gadzhimurad Rashidov | 3
(Japan) Rei Higuchi | 1
(Sakha Republic) Aikhan Antonov | 0
(Krasnoyarsk Krai) Ruslan Zhendaev | 10
(Dagestan) Razambek Zhamalov | 3
(Sakha Republic) Dyulustan Bulatov | 1
(Dagestan) Gadzhimagomed Aliev | 5
(Chechnya) Bekkhan Goygereyev | 10
(Dagestan) Shamil Omarov | 10
(Kazakhstan) Bek Zhaksylykov | 0

Round of 32
(Sakha Republic) Nyurgun Skryabin | 4
(Dagestan) Murshid Mutalimov | 2
(Oklahoma) Cody Brewer | 1
(Dagestan) Gadzhimurad Rashidov | 12
(Krasnoyarsk Krai) Ruslan Zhendaev | 0
(Dagestan) Razambek Zhamalov | 10
(Chechnya) Bekkhan Goygereyev | 9
(Dagestan) Shamil Omarov | 6

Round of 16
(Sakha Republic) Nyurgun Skryabin | 1
(Dagestan) Gadzhimurad Rashidov | 4
(Dagestan) Razambek Zhamalov | 2
(Chechnya) Bekkhan Goygereyev | 6

Quarterfinals
(Dagestan) Gadzhimurad Rashidov | 8
(Chechnya) Bekkhan Goygereyev | 0

=== Repechage ===
Repechage round 1
(Japan) Rei Higuchi | 14^{F}
(Oklahoma) Cody Brewer | 12

Repechage round 2
(Kazakhstan) Artas Sanaa | 10
(Uzbekistan) Abbas Rakhmonov | 0
(Japan) Rei Higuchi | 10
(Sakha Republic) Nyurgun Skryabin | 0

Repechage round 3
(Kazakhstan) Artas Sanaa | 0
(Sakha Republic) Viktor Rassadin | 10
(Japan) Rei Higuchi | 13
(Chechnya) Bekkhan Goygereyev | 2

Bronze medals
(Sakha Republic) Viktor Rassadin | 12
(Tuva) Nachyn Kuular | 3
(Japan) Rei Higuchi | 10
(Buryatia) Bulat Batoev | 0
