= Russian National Freestyle 2016 – Men's freestyle 61 kg =

The men's freestyle 61 kg is a competition featured at the 2016 Russian National Freestyle Wrestling Championships, and was held in Yakutsk, Russia on May 28.

== Medalists ==
Gold	(Yakutia) Egor Ponomarev
Silver	(Yakutia) Viktor Rassadin
Bronze	(Yakutia) Vyacheslav Efremov
Bronze	(Yakutia) Nurgun Skryabin

== Results ==
Legend

- F — Won by fall
- WO — Won by walkover

=== Finals ===
Semifinals		Final
(Yakutia) Vyacheslav Efremov	0
(Yakutia) Viktor Rassadin	11	(Yakutia) Viktor Rassadin	1
(Yakutia) Egor Ponomarev	3	(Yakutia) Egor Ponomarev	5
(Yakutia) Nurgun Skryabin	2

=== Top half ===
==== Section 1 ====
Round of 64

Round of 32
(Republic of Crimea (Russia)) Ashamaz Kardanov
(Krasnoyarsk Krai) Bayar Tsyrenov	WO
(Moscow Oblast) Rustam Karakhanov	WO
(Buryatia) Viktor Banzaraktsaev
(Republic of Crimea (Russia)) Shamil Omarov
(Moscow Oblast) Osman Dzhugeliya	WO
(Yakutia) Vyacheslav Efremov	WO
(Dagestan) Shmkhal Khizriev

Round of 16
(Republic of Crimea (Russia)) Ashamaz Kardanov	9
(Moscow Oblast) Rustam Karakhanov	9
(Moscow Oblast) Osman Dzhugeliya	3
(Yakutia) Vyacheslav Efremov	4

Quarterfinals
(Moscow Oblast) Rustam Karakhanov	0
(Yakutia) Vyacheslav Efremov	2

==== Section 2 ====
Round of 64

Round of 32
(Yakutia) Viktor Rassadin	WO
(Dagestan) Rustam Abdurashidov
(Abkhazia) Rustam Ampar	1
(Buryatia) Dasha Sharastepanov	2
(Kaliningrad Oblast) Ibragim Ilyasov	10
(Buryatia) Bato Badmaev	0
(Khanty-Mansi Autonomous Okrug) Azamat Khodov	1
(Moscow Oblast) Zelimkhan Abakarov	11

Round of 16
(Yakutia) Viktor Rassadin	13
(Buryatia) Dasha Sharastepanov	3
(Kaliningrad Oblast) Ibragim Ilyasov	6
(Moscow Oblast) Zelimkhan Abakarov	8

Quarterfinals
(Yakutia) Viktor Rassadin	6
(Moscow Oblast) Zelimkhan Abakarov	0

=== Bottom half ===
==== Section 3 ====
Round of 64

Round of 32
(Dagestan) Islam Mazhitov
(Krasnodar Krai) Gevorg Terteryan	WO
(Tula Oblast) Aital Okoneshnikov	0
(Yakutia) Egor Ponomarev	11
(Dagestan) Gadzhimogomed Aliev
(Oryol Oblast) Maksim Egorchkin	WO
(Dagestan) Shamil Rashidov
(Yakutia) Dulustan Bulatov	WO

Round of 16
(Krasnodar Krai) Gevorg Terteryan	0
(Yakutia) Egor Ponomarev	8
(Oryol Oblast) Maksim Egorchkin	5
(Yakutia) Dulustan Bulatov	3

Quarterfinals
(Yakutia) Egor Ponomarev	6
(Oryol Oblast) Maksim Egorchkin	3

==== Section 4 ====
Round of 64
(Zabaykalsky Krai) Bulat Batoev
(Republic of Crimea (Russia)) Bakir Akhmedov	WO

Round of 32
(Moscow) Rustam Murtazaliev	WO
(Chechnya) Bekkhan Goygereyev
(Yakutia) Vladimir Flegontov	14
(Krasnodar Krai) David Karaibragimov	1
(Yakutia) Revoly Samsonov	1
(Tuva) Salbachy Kuzhuget	10
(Yakutia) Nurgun Skryabin	10
(Republic of Crimea (Russia)) Bakir Akhmedov	4

Round of 16
(Moscow) Rustam Murtazaliev	5
(Yakutia) Vladimir Flegontov	7
(Tuva) Salbachy Kuzhuget	0
(Yakutia) Nurgun Skryabin	12

Quarterfinals
(Yakutia) Vladimir Flegontov	0
(Yakutia) Nurgun Skryabin	11

=== Repechage ===
Repechage round 1
(Tula Oblast) Aital Okoneshnikov	3
(Krasnodar Krai) Gevorg Terteryan	14
(Dagestan) Rustam Abdurashidov
(Buryatia) Dasha Sharastepanov	WO

Repechage round 2
(Krasnodar Krai) Gevorg Terteryan	2
(Oryol Oblast) Maksim Egorchkin	8
(Buryatia) Dasha Sharastepanov	7
(Moscow Oblast) Zelimkhan Abakarov	0

Bronze medals
(Oryol Oblast) Maksim Egorchkin	0
(Yakutia) Nurgun Skryabin	5
(Buryatia) Dasha Sharastepanov	4
(Yakutia) Vyacheslav Efremov	5
