= 2018 World Wrestling Championships – Men's freestyle 61 kg =

Men's freestyle 61 kg at the 2018 World Championships
- Venue: László Papp Budapest Sports Arena
- Dates: 20–21 October 2018
- Competitors: 23 from 23 nations

Medalists
gold medal	Yowlys Bonne	Cuba
silver medal	Gadzhimurad Rashidov	Russia
bronze medal	Joe Colon	United States
bronze medal	Tümenbilegiin Tüvshintulga	Mongolia

The men's freestyle 61 kilograms is a competition featured at the 2018 World Wrestling Championships, and was held in Budapest, Hungary on 20 and 21 October.

This freestyle wrestling competition consists of a single-elimination tournament, with a repechage used to determine the winner of two bronze medals. The two finalists face off for gold and silver medals. Each wrestler who loses to one of the two finalists moves into the repechage, culminating in a pair of bronze medal matches featuring the semifinal losers each facing the remaining repechage opponent from their half of the bracket.

Yowlys Bonne from Cuba won the gold medal.

== Results ==
Legend

- F — Won by fall

=== Final ===
Final
Yowlys Bonne (CUB)	6
Gadzhimurad Rashidov (RUS)	5

=== Top half ===
Round of 32
Kuat Amirtayev (KAZ)	1
Ivan Bileichuk (UKR)	11

Round of 16
Abbos Rakhmonov (UZB)	0
Bagher Yakhkeshi (IRI)	7
Yowlys Bonne (CUB)	4
Ivan Guidea (ROU)	2
Vladimir Dubov (BUL)	8
Recep Topal (TUR)	6
Ivan Bileichuk (UKR)	6
Joe Colon (USA)	9

Quarterfinals
Bagher Yakhkeshi (IRI)	8
Yowlys Bonne (CUB)	10^{F}
Vladimir Dubov (BUL)	0
Joe Colon (USA)	10

Semifinals
Yowlys Bonne (CUB)	9
Joe Colon (USA)	4

=== Bottom half ===
Round of 32
Adama Diatta (SEN)	10
József Molnár (HUN)	2
Scott Schiller (CAN)	6
Parviz Ibrahimov (AZE)	8
Zhou Pingping (CHN)	0
Kazuya Koyanagi (JPN)	11
Andrei Bekreneu (BLR)	3
Kim Jin-cheol (KOR)	2
Lowe Bingham (NRU)	0
Sonba Tanaji Gongane (IND)	10
Tümenbilegiin Tüvshintulga (MGL)	8
Ulukbek Zholdoshbekov (KGZ)	6

Round of 16
Beka Lomtadze (GEO)	6
Adama Diatta (SEN)	0
Parviz Ibrahimov (AZE)	4
Kazuya Koyanagi (JPN)	9
Andrei Bekreneu (BLR)	3
Sonba Tanaji Gongane (IND)	4
Tümenbilegiin Tüvshintulga (MGL)	1
Gadzhimurad Rashidov (RUS)	2

Quarterfinals
Beka Lomtadze (GEO)	11
Kazuya Koyanagi (JPN)	1
Sonba Tanaji Gongane (IND)	0
Gadzhimurad Rashidov (RUS)	12

Semifinals
Beka Lomtadze (GEO)	0
Gadzhimurad Rashidov (RUS)	10

=== Repechage ===
Repechage round 2
Ivan Guidea (ROU)	1
Bagher Yakhkeshi (IRI)	11
Tümenbilegiin Tüvshintulga (MGL)	7
Sonba Tanaji Gongane (IND)	0

Bronze medals
Bagher Yakhkeshi (IRI)	2
Joe Colon (USA)	13
Tümenbilegiin Tüvshintulga (MGL)	6
Beka Lomtadze (GEO)	3
