= Yowlys Bonne =

Cuban freestyle wrestler

Personal information
- Nationality: Cuba
- Born: November 2, 1983 (age 42) Guantánamo, Cuba
- Height: 164 cm (5 ft 5 in)
- Weight: 61 kg (134 lb)

Sport
- Country: Cuba
- Sport: Freestyle wrestling
- Event: 61 kg
- Club: Cerro Pelado Habana
- Coached by: Julio Mendieta Cuellar
Medal record
Representing Cuba
Men's freestyle wrestling
World Championships
Gold medal – first place	2018 Budapest	61 kg
Bronze medal – third place	2014 Tashkent	61 kg
Bronze medal – third place	2017 Paris	61 kg
Pan American Games
Gold medal – first place	2015 Toronto	57 kg
Bronze medal – third place	2011 Guadalajara	60 kg
Pan American Championships
Gold medal – first place	2005 Guatemala City	60 kg
Gold medal – first place	2012 Colorado Springs	60 kg
Bronze medal – third place	2016 Frisco	65 kg

Yowlys Bonne Rodríguez (born November 2, 1983) is a Cuban world champion freestyle wrestler and three-time world-level medalist.

== Early life ==
Bonne is from Guantánamo, Cuba.

== Career ==
In 2018 Bonne became world champion by defeating Gadzhimurad Rashidov of Russia in the final match, 6–5. Bonne is also a two-time Olympian, having competed in freestyle wrestling at both the 2012 Olympics in London and the 2016 Olympics in Rio de Janeiro. In 2015, Bonne was eliminated from the world tournament in a controversial match.

== Wrestling style ==
Bonne is known for an aggressive wrestling style that includes explosive throws and other eye-catching maneuvers. According to one wrestling outlet, Bonne's wrestling style "has put the phrase 'Bonne Bombs' into the wrestling lexicon."

== Freestyle record ==
World Championships & Olympic Games Matches
Res.	Record	Opponent	Score	Date	Event	Location
2018 UWW world (gold) at 61kg
Win	16–6	(Russia) Gadzhimurad Rashidov	6-5	October 20, 2018	2018 World Wrestling Championships	Budapest, Hungary
Win	15–6	(United States) Joe Colon	9-4	October 20, 2018	2018 World Wrestling Championships	Budapest, Hungary
Win	14–6	(Iran) Bagher Yakhkeshi	Fall	October 20, 2018	2018 World Wrestling Championships	Budapest, Hungary
Win	13–6	(Romania) Ivan Guidea	4-2	October 20, 2018	2018 World Wrestling Championships	Budapest, Hungary
2017 UWW world (bronze) at 61kg
Win	12–6	(Japan) Rinya Nakamura	Fall	August 21, 2017	2017 World Wrestling Championships	Paris, France
Loss	11–6	(Azerbaijan) Haji Aliyev	Fall	August 21, 2017	2017 World Wrestling Championships	Paris, France
Win	11–5	(Kazakhstan) Daulet Niyazbekov	10-8	August 21, 2017	2017 World Wrestling Championships	Paris, France
Win	10-5	(Iran) Behnam Ehsanpour	7-2	August 21, 2017	2017 World Wrestling Championships	Paris, France
Win	9-5	(China) Liu Minghu	3-0	August 21, 2017	2017 World Wrestling Championships	Paris, France
2016 Olympic 5th at 57kg
Loss	8-5	(Iran) Hassan Rahimi	Fall	August 19, 2016	2016 Summer Olympics	Rio de Janeiro, Brazil
Win	8-4	(North Korea) Yang Kyong-il	Tech Fall	August 19, 2016	2016 Summer Olympics	Rio de Janeiro, Brazil
Loss	7-4	(Japan) Rei Higuchi	4-8	August 19, 2016	2016 Summer Olympics	Rio de Janeiro, Brazil
Win	7-3	(Senegal) Adama Diatta	7-4	August 19, 2016	2016 Summer Olympics	Rio de Janeiro, Brazil
Win	6-3	(Uzbekistan) Abbos Rakhmonov	Tech Fall	August 19, 2016	2016 Summer Olympics	Rio de Janeiro, Brazil
2015 UWW world 16th at 57kg
Loss	5-3	(Russia) Viktor Lebedev	2-2	September 12, 2015	2015 World Wrestling Championships	(United States) Las Vegas, Nevada
Win	5-2	(Kyrgyzstan) Samat Nadyrbek Uulu	Tech Fall	September 12, 2015	2015 World Wrestling Championships	(United States) Las Vegas, Nevada
2014 UWW world (bronze) at 61kg
Win	4-2	(Moldova) Andrei Perpeliţă	8-2	September 9, 2014	2014 World Wrestling Championships	Tashkent, Uzbekistan
Loss	3-2	(Azerbaijan) Haji Aliyev	2-4	September 9, 2014	2014 World Wrestling Championships	Tashkent, Uzbekistan
Win	3-1	(Russia) Aleksandr Bogomoev	Tech Fall	September 9, 2014	2014 World Wrestling Championships	Tashkent, Uzbekistan
Win	2-1	(India) Rahul Mann	Tech Fall	September 9, 2014	2014 World Wrestling Championships	Tashkent, Uzbekistan
Win	1-1	(Senegal) Jean Diatta	Fall	September 9, 2014	2014 World Wrestling Championships	Tashkent, Uzbekistan
2012 Olympic 14th at 60kg
Loss	0-1	(Japan) Kenichi Yumoto	2-2, 0–2	August 10, 2012	2012 Summer Olympics	London, United Kingdom
