= Golden Grand Prix Ivan Yarygin 2018 – Men's freestyle 61 kg =

The men's freestyle 61 kg is a competition featured at the Golden Grand Prix Ivan Yarygin 2018, and was held in Krasnoyarsk, Russia on 26 January.

== Medalists ==
Gold	(Dagestan) Gadzhimurad Rashidov
Silver	(Kabardino-Balkaria) Ismail Musukaev
Bronze	(Mongolia) Tümenbilegiin Tüvshintulga
Bronze	(Buryatia) Aleksandr Bogomoev

== Results ==
Legend

- F — Won by fall
- WO — Won by walkover (forfeit)

=== Final ===
Final
(Kabardino-Balkaria) Ismail Musukaev	2
(Dagestan) Gadzhimurad Rashidov	3

=== Top half ===
- wrestler 1: Ismail Musukaev of Kabardino-Balkaria def. Rustam Abdurashidov of Dagestan by TF, (12–1)
- wrestler 2: Aleksandr Bogomoev of Buryatia def. Yulian Gergenov of Buryatia (9–0)

==== Section 1 ====
Round of 8
(Turkmenistan) Mekan Orazow	0
(Uzbekistan) Abbos Rakhmonov	11
(Kabardino-Balkaria) Ismail Musukaev	10
(Georgia (country)) Teimuraz Vanishvili	0
(Mongolia) Tümenbilegiin Tüvshintulga	8
(United States) Cory Clark	6
(China) Shaofeng Liang	16
(Mongolia) Nasanbuyan Narmandakh	9
(Turkey) Recep Topal	3
(Buryatia) Aleksandr Bogomoev	9
(Dagestan) Gadzhimurad Rashidov	WO
(Kazakhstan) Abil Ussin
(United States) Tony Ramos	6^{F}
(Mongolia) Munkh-Erdene Altansuvd	1

Quarterfinals
(Cuba) Dabian Quintana Jaime	0
(Uzbekistan) Abbos Rakhmonov	8
(Kabardino-Balkaria) Ismail Musukaev	7
(Mongolia) Tümenbilegiin Tüvshintulga	0
(China) Shaofeng Liang	0
(Buryatia) Aleksandr Bogomoev	10
(Dagestan) Gadzhimurad Rashidov	11
(United States) Tony Ramos	0

Semifinals
(Uzbekistan) Abbos Rakhmonov	0
(Kabardino-Balkaria) Ismail Musukaev	5
(Buryatia) Aleksandr Bogomoev	0
(Dagestan) Gadzhimurad Rashidov	2

Final

== Repechage ==
Repechage round 1
-
-
-
-

Repechage round 2
(Georgia (country)) Teimuraz Vanishvili	0
(Mongolia) Tümenbilegiin Tüvshintulga	10
(Kazakhstan) Abil Ussin
(United States) Tony Ramos	WO

Bronze medals
(Mongolia) Tümenbilegiin Tüvshintulga	5
(Uzbekistan) Abbos Rakhmonov	1
(United States) Tony Ramos	0
(Buryatia) Aleksandr Bogomoev	4
