= Russian National Freestyle 2016 – Men's freestyle 57 kg =

The men's freestyle 57 kg is a competition featured at the 2016 Russian National Freestyle Wrestling Championships, and was held in Yakutsk, Russia on May 27.

== Medalists ==
Gold	(Yakutia) Viktor Lebedev
Gold	(Buryatia) Aleksandr Bogomoev
Bronze	(Chechnya) Dzhamal Otarsultanov
Bronze	(Yakutia) Aryian Tyutrin

== Incident between Lebedev and Musukaev ==
At the end of the quarterfinal wrestling match between Lebedev and Musukaev the referees awarded the victory to Viktor Lebedev. However, after the match the Russian Championships wrestling commission considered mistakes of the referee and awarded the victory to Ismail Musukaev (4-2). Even so, Lebedev remained in the semifinals.

== Results ==
Legend

- F — Won by fall
- WO — Won by walkover

=== Finals ===
Semifinals		Final
(Yakutia) Viktor Lebedev	7
(Buryatia) Aldar Balzhinimaev	0	(Yakutia) Viktor Lebedev	1
(Chechnya) Dzhamal Otarsultanov	1	(Buryatia) Aleksandr Bogomoev	1
(Buryatia) Aleksandr Bogomoev	9

=== Top half ===
==== Section 1 ====
Round of 64

Round of 32
(Yakutia) Viktor Lebedev	6
(Yakutia) Dmitry Aksenov	0
(Yakutia) Aryian Tyutrin	11
(Yakutia) Viktor Rassadin	0
(Tuva) Arzyl Artysh-ool	0
(Kabardino-Balkaria) Ismail Musukaev	10
(Yakutia) Robert Okorokov	5
(Yakutia) Nurgun Aleksandrov	1

Round of 16
(Yakutia) Viktor Lebedev	10
(Yakutia) Aryian Tyutrin	0
(Kabardino-Balkaria) Ismail Musukaev	10
(Yakutia) Robert Okorokov	0

Quarterfinals
(Yakutia) Viktor Lebedev	4 (2)
(Kabardino-Balkaria) Ismail Musukaev	3 (4)

==== Section 2 ====
Round of 64

Round of 32
(North Ossetia–Alania) Azamat Tuskaev	3
(Dagestan) Gadzhimurad Rashidov	5
(Yakutia) Nikolay Okhlopkov	12
(Khanty-Mansi Autonomous Okrug) Nabibullah Shikhmurzaev	1
(Dagestan) Adam Ozdarbiev	6
(Moscow Oblast) Jabrayil Gairbekov	0
(Buryatia) Aldar Balzhinimaev	6
(Chechnya) Islam Dadaev	4

Round of 16
(Dagestan) Gadzhimurad Rashidov	6
(Yakutia) Nikolay Okhlopkov	2
(Dagestan) Adam Ozdarbiev	5
(Buryatia) Aldar Balzhinimaev	6

Quarterfinals
(Dagestan) Gadzhimurad Rashidov
(Buryatia) Aldar Balzhinimaev	WO

=== Bottom half ===
==== Section 3 ====
Round of 64

Round of 32
(Dagestan) Nariman Israpilov	6
(Tuva) Omak Syuryun	6
(Leningrad Oblast) Arslan-Ali Kazavov	2
(Bryansk Oblast) Nodar Arabidze	5
(Krasnodar Krai) Amayak Khsatyan	7
(Yakutia) Aikhan Antonov	3
(Dagestan) Zaur Uguev	2
(Chechnya) Dzhamal Otarsultanov	5

Round of 16
(Dagestan) Nariman Israpilov	6
(Bryansk Oblast) Nodar Arabidze	2
(Krasnodar Krai) Amayak Khsatyan	0
(Chechnya) Dzhamal Otarsultanov	10

Quarterfinals
(Dagestan) Nariman Israpilov
(Chechnya) Dzhamal Otarsultanov	WO

==== Section 4 ====
Round of 64
(Saint Petersburg) Magomderasul Magomedov	5
(Tuva) Khuresh-ool Donduk-ool	8
(Buryatia) Zarikto Buldaev	14
(Bryansk Oblast) Ziyavuddin Gireev	3
(Dagestan) Artem Gebekov	5
(Yakutia) Eduard Grigoriev	1

Round of 32
(Buryatia) Aleksandr Bogomoev	9
(Stavropol Krai) Tamerlan Karaev	0
(Republic of Crimea (Russia)) Rasul Mashezov	12
(Buryatia) Tamir Garmaev	7
(Dagestan) Hassanhussein Badrudinov	8
(Tuva) Khuresh-ool Donduk-ool	7
(Buryatia) Zarikto Buldaev	0
(Dagestan) Artem Gebekov	10

Round of 16
(Buryatia) Aleksandr Bogomoev	6
(Republic of Crimea (Russia)) Rasul Mashezov	1
(Dagestan) Khusankhusein Badrudinov	0
(Dagestan) Artem Gebekov	6

Quarterfinals
(Buryatia) Aleksandr Bogomoev	WO
(Dagestan) Artem Gebekov

=== Repechage ===
Repechage round 1
(Yakutia) Dmitry Aksenov	1
(Yakutia) Aryian Tyutrin	2
(Stavropol Krai) Tamerlan Karaev	WO
(Republic of Crimea (Russia)) Rasul Mashezov

Repechage round 2
(Yakutia) Aryian Tyutrin	WO
(Kabardino-Balkaria) Ismail Musukaev
(Stavropol Krai) Tamerlan Karaev	WO
(Dagestan) Artem Gebekov

Bronze medals
(Yakutia) Aryian Tyutrin	9
(Buryatia) Aldar Balzhinimaev	6
(Stavropol Krai) Tamerlan Karaev	1
(Chechnya) Dzhamal Otarsultanov	12
