= 2017 World Wrestling Championships – Men's freestyle 61 kg =

Wrestling competition

Men's freestyle 61 kg at the 2017 World Championships
- Venue: AccorHotels Arena
- Dates: 25 August 2017
- Competitors: 31 from 31 nations

Medalists
gold medal	Haji Aliyev	Azerbaijan
silver medal	Gadzhimurad Rashidov	Russia
bronze medal	Vladimer Khinchegashvili	Georgia
bronze medal	Yowlys Bonne	Cuba

The men's freestyle 61 kilograms is a competition featured at the 2017 World Wrestling Championships, and was held in Paris, France on 25 August.

This freestyle wrestling competition consisted of a single-elimination tournament, with a repechage used to determine the winners of two bronze medals.

== Results ==
Legend

- F — Won by fall

=== Final ===
Final
Gadzhimurad Rashidov (RUS)	1
Haji Aliyev (AZE)	7^{F}

=== Top half ===
Round of 32
Gadzhimurad Rashidov (RUS)	11
József Molnár (HUN)	0
Tümenbilegiin Tüvshintulga (MGL)	5
Husein Shakhbanau (BLR)	1
Vladimer Khinchegashvili (GEO)	10
Cristian Nicolescu (PLW)	0
Cengizhan Erdoğan (TUR)	4
Iurii Siemakin (FRA)	2
Harphool Gulia (IND)	8
Elmedin Sejfulau (MKD)	0
Lowe Bingham (NRU)	0
Ivan Bileichuk (UKR)	10
Ivan Guidea (ROU)	12
Steven Takahashi (CAN)	2

Round of 16
Logan Stieber (USA)	0
Gadzhimurad Rashidov (RUS)	11
Tümenbilegiin Tüvshintulga (MGL)	1
Vladimer Khinchegashvili (GEO)	7
Cengizhan Erdoğan (TUR)	10
Harphool Gulia (IND)	0
Ivan Bileichuk (UKR)	2
Ivan Guidea (ROU)	9

Quarterfinals
Gadzhimurad Rashidov (RUS)	6
Vladimer Khinchegashvili (GEO)	3
Cengizhan Erdoğan (TUR)	5
Ivan Guidea (ROU)	3

Semifinals
Gadzhimurad Rashidov (RUS)	8
Cengizhan Erdoğan (TUR)	2

=== Bottom half ===
Round of 32
Andrei Prepeliţă (MDA)	3
Rinya Nakamura (JPN)	7
Alibek Osmonov (KGZ)	0
Haji Aliyev (AZE)	8
Dimitar Ivanov (BUL)	8
Mykola Bolotňuk (SVK)	14
Tommy García (DOM)	2
Yun Jun-sik (KOR)	5
Daulet Niyazbekov (KAZ)	9
Valodya Frangulyan (ARM)	5
Ethan Aguigui (GUM)	0
Manuel Wolfer (GER)	10
Liu Minghu (CHN)	0
Yowlys Bonne (CUB)	3
Kim Han-song (PRK)	3
Behnam Ehsanpour (IRI)	5

Round of 16
Rinya Nakamura (JPN)	1
Haji Aliyev (AZE)	10
Mykola Bolotňuk (SVK)	4
Yun Jun-sik (KOR)	3
Daulet Niyazbekov (KAZ)	10
Manuel Wolfer (GER)	0
Yowlys Bonne (CUB)	7
Behnam Ehsanpour (IRI)	2

Quarterfinals
Haji Aliyev (AZE)	10
Mykola Bolotňuk (SVK)	0
Daulet Niyazbekov (KAZ)	8
Yowlys Bonne (CUB)	10

Semifinals
Haji Aliyev (AZE)	10^{F}
Yowlys Bonne (CUB)	0

=== Repechage ===
Repechage round 1
József Molnár (HUN)	0
Logan Stieber (USA)	10
Alibek Osmonov (KGZ)	0
Rinya Nakamura (JPN)	10

Repechage round 2
Logan Stieber (USA)	0
Vladimer Khinchegashvili (GEO)	10
Rinya Nakamura (JPN)	10
Mykola Bolotňuk (SVK)	0

Bronze medals
Vladimer Khinchegashvili (GEO)	3
Cengizhan Erdoğan (TUR)	0
Rinya Nakamura (JPN)	0
Yowlys Bonne (CUB)	10^{F}
