= 2017 Russian National Freestyle Wrestling Championships =

2017 Russian Nationals
- Host city: Nazran, Ingushetia, Russia
- Dates: June 12–14
- Stadium: Berd Evloev arena

Champions
- Freestyle: Dagestan

The Russian National Freestyle Wrestling Championships 2017 (also known as the Russian Nationals 2017) was held in Nazran, Ingushetia, Russia by the Russian Wrestling Federation at the Berd Evloev Arena from 12–14 June 2017.

== Medal overview ==
=== Medal table ===
Rank	Nation	Gold	Silver	Bronze	Total
1	Dagestan	4	5	2	11
2	(North Ossetia–Alania) North Ossetia-Alania	3	1	1	5
3	Leningrad Oblast	1	0	0	1
4	Sakha Republic	0	1	1	2
5	Ivanovo Oblast	0	1	0	1
6	Chechnya	0	0	5	5
7	Krasnoyarsk Krai	0	0	4	4
8	Buryatia	0	0	1	1
8	Khanty-Mansi Autonomous Okrug	0	0	1	1
8	Tuva	0	0	1	1
Totals (10 entries)		8	8	16	32

=== Men's freestyle ===
Event	Gold	Silver	Bronze
57 kg	(Dagestan) Zaur Uguev	(Dagestan) Artem Gebekov	(Tuva) Omak Syuryun
57 kg	(Dagestan) Zaur Uguev	(Dagestan) Artem Gebekov	(Sakha Republic) Dmitriy Aksenov
61 kg	(Dagestan) Gadzhimurad Rashidov	(Sakha Republic) Viktor Rassadin	(Chechnya) Islam Dudaev
61 kg	(Dagestan) Gadzhimurad Rashidov	(Sakha Republic) Viktor Rassadin	(Chechnya) Bekkhan Goygereyev
65 kg	(North Ossetia–Alania) Alan Gogaev	(Dagestan) Murshid Mutalimov	(Krasnoyarsk Krai) Nachyn Kuular
65 kg	(North Ossetia–Alania) Alan Gogaev	(Dagestan) Murshid Mutalimov	(Chechnya) Imam Adzhiev
70 kg	(Dagestan) Magomedkhabib Kadimagomedov	(Ivanovo Oblast) Magomed Dibirgadzhiev	(Chechnya) Rasul Dzhukayev
70 kg	(Dagestan) Magomedkhabib Kadimagomedov	(Ivanovo Oblast) Magomed Dibirgadzhiev	(Khanty-Mansi Autonomous Okrug) David Baev
74 kg	(North Ossetia–Alania) Khetag Tsabolov	(Dagestan) Gadzhi Nabiev	(North Ossetia–Alania) Alan Zaseev
74 kg	(North Ossetia–Alania) Khetag Tsabolov	(Dagestan) Gadzhi Nabiev	(Krasnoyarsk Krai) Nikita Suchkov
86 kg	(North Ossetia–Alania) Vladislav Valiev	(Dagestan) Shamil Kudiyamagomedov	(Krasnoyarsk Krai) Anzor Urishev
86 kg	(North Ossetia–Alania) Vladislav Valiev	(Dagestan) Shamil Kudiyamagomedov	(Dagestan) Arsen-Ali Musalaliev
97 kg	(Dagestan) Abdulrashid Sadulaev	(North Ossetia–Alania) Vladislav Baitcaev	(Krasnoyarsk Krai) Yuri Belonovskiy
97 kg	(Dagestan) Abdulrashid Sadulaev	(North Ossetia–Alania) Vladislav Baitcaev	(Dagestan) Rasul Magomedov
125 kg	(Leningrad Oblast) Anzor Khizriev	(Dagestan) Magomedgadzhi Nurasulov	(Chechnya) Adlan Ibragimov
125 kg	(Leningrad Oblast) Anzor Khizriev	(Dagestan) Magomedgadzhi Nurasulov	(Buryatia) Tsybik Maksarov

== See also ==
- 2015 Russian National Freestyle Wrestling Championships
- 2015 Russian National Greco-Roman Wrestling Championships
- 2016 Russian National Freestyle Wrestling Championships
- 2018 Russian National Freestyle Wrestling Championships
- Soviet and Russian results in men's freestyle wrestling
