= Dagestan State Medical University =

Russian medical school in Dagestan

- Дагестанский государственный медицинский университет
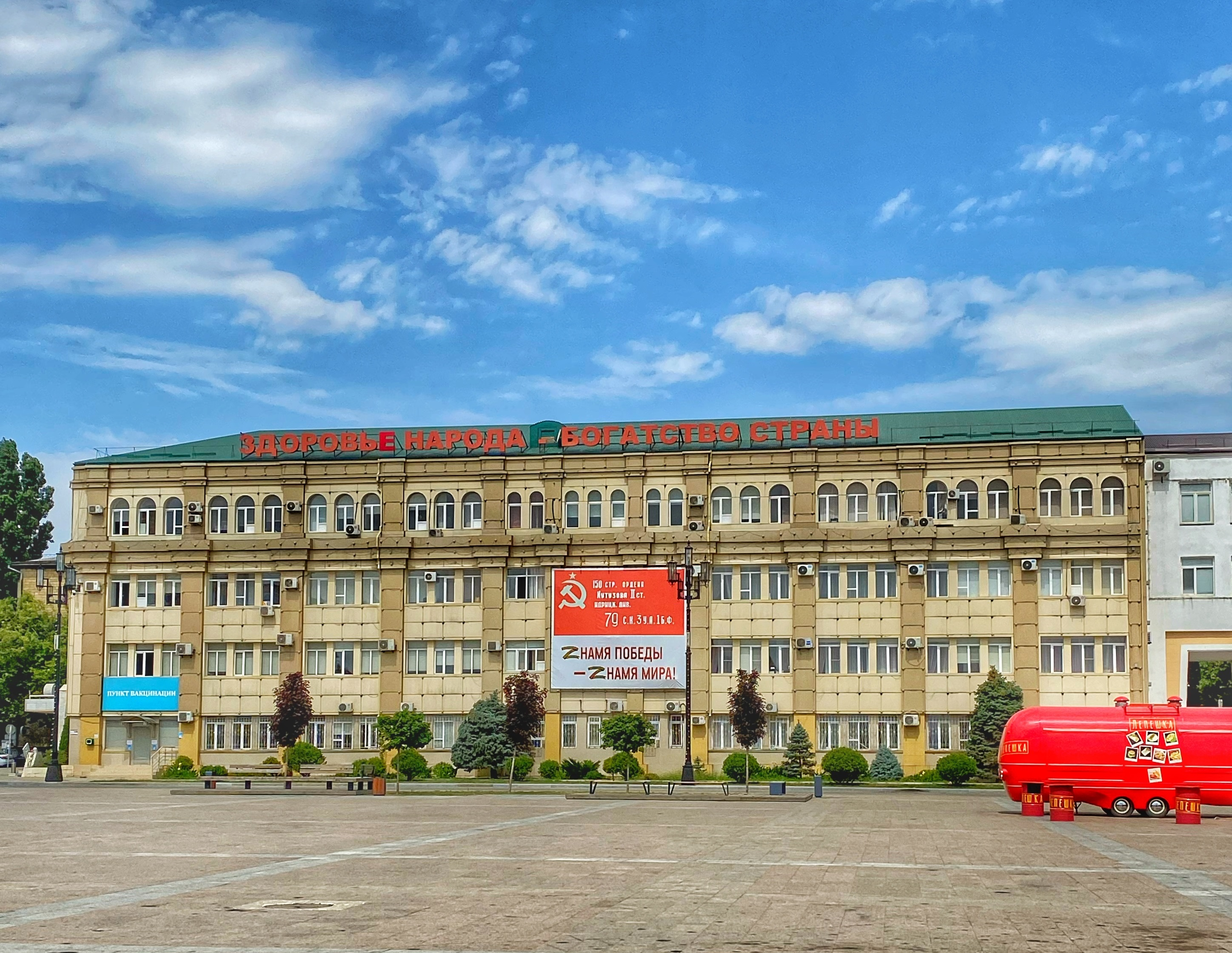
- Dagestan State Medical University in 2022
- Type: public
- Established: 15 October 1932
- Location: Makhachkala, Dagestan, Russia; 42°59′01″N 47°30′13″E
- Campus: Urban
- Website: dgmu.ru

Dagestan State Medical University (Russian: Федеральное государственное бюджетное образовательное учреждение высшего образования «Дагестанский государственный медицинский университет» Министерства здравоохранения Российской Федерации) is a higher educational institution in Makhachkala that trains specialists in the field of medicine and pharmaceuticals.

== History ==
It was founded in 1932 as the Dagestan State Medical Institute, it initially included only one medical faculty.

A monument was erected in memory of doctors who died during the COVID-19 pandemic in Russia.

== Alumni ==
- Elmira Glubokovskaya, politician and public figure
- Shamil Omarov
