= 2016 Golden Grand Prix Ivan Yarygin =

Ivan Yarygin 2016
- Host city: Krasnoyarsk, Russia
- Dates: January 29–31
- Stadium: Sport Palace Ivan Yarygin Arena

Champions
- Freestyle: North Ossetia–Alania
- Women: Russia

The XXVII Golden Grand Prix Ivan Yarygin 2016, also known as Ivan Yarygin 2016 were held in Krasnoyarsk, Russia between 29 and 31 January 2016.

The international tournament included competition in both men and women's freestyle wrestling. The Grand Prix is held in honor of 2-time Olympic Champion Ivan Yarygin.

== Medal overview ==
=== Medal table ===
Rank	Nation	Gold	Silver	Bronze	Total
1	Russia	4	2	9	15
2	(North Ossetia–Alania) North Ossetia-Alania	3	1	3	7
3	Mongolia	2	0	7	9
4	Japan	1	4	0	5
5	Dagestan	1	3	5	9
6	Chechnya	1	1	4	6
7	Kazakhstan	1	1	1	3
8	Buryatia	1	0	1	2
8	Sakha Republic	1	0	1	2
10	Krasnoyarsk Krai	1	0	0	1
11	United States	0	1	1	2
12	Italy	0	1	0	1
12	Kabardino-Balkaria	0	1	0	1
12	Moscow Oblast	0	1	0	1
Totals (14 entries)		16	16	32	64

=== Men's freestyle results ===
Event	Gold	Silver	Bronze
55 kg	(Buryatia) Aleksandr Bogomoev	(Moscow Oblast) Rustam Ampar	(Dagestan) Artem Gebekov
55 kg	(Buryatia) Aleksandr Bogomoev	(Moscow Oblast) Rustam Ampar	(Dagestan) Gadzhimurad Rashidov
61 kg	(Sakha Republic) Nurgun Skryabin	(Dagestan) Imam Adzhiev	(Chechnya) Akhmed Chakaev
61 kg	(Sakha Republic) Nurgun Skryabin	(Dagestan) Imam Adzhiev	(Sakha Republic) Viktor Lebedev
65 kg	(Krasnoyarsk Krai) Israil Kasumov	(Dagestan) Magomed Kurbanaliev	(Dagestan) Alibeggadzhi Emeev
65 kg	(Krasnoyarsk Krai) Israil Kasumov	(Dagestan) Magomed Kurbanaliev	(Mongolia) Ganzorigiin Mandakhnaran
70 kg	(North Ossetia–Alania) Zaurbek Sidakov	(Kabardino-Balkaria) Khusein Suyunchev	(Chechnya) Rasul Arsanaliev
70 kg	(North Ossetia–Alania) Zaurbek Sidakov	(Kabardino-Balkaria) Khusein Suyunchev	(North Ossetia–Alania) Atsamaz Sankoev
74 kg	(North Ossetia–Alania) Zaur Makiev	(Chechnya) Muslim Dadaev	(Dagestan) Akhmed Gadzhimagomedov
74 kg	(North Ossetia–Alania) Zaur Makiev	(Chechnya) Muslim Dadaev	(North Ossetia–Alania) Kakhaber Khubezhty
86 kg	(Dagestan) Shamil Kudiyamagomedov	(Dagestan) Arsen-Ali Musalaliev	(Dagestan) Dauren Kurugliev
86 kg	(Dagestan) Shamil Kudiyamagomedov	(Dagestan) Arsen-Ali Musalaliev	(North Ossetia–Alania) Vladislav Valiev
97 kg	(Chechnya) Anzor Boltukaev	(United States) Jake Varner	(United States) Kyle Snyder
97 kg	(Chechnya) Anzor Boltukaev	(United States) Jake Varner	(Chechnya) Adlan Ibragimov
125 kg	(North Ossetia–Alania) Vladislav Baitcaev	(North Ossetia–Alania) Alan Khugaev	(Buryatia) Baldan Tsyzhipov
125 kg	(North Ossetia–Alania) Vladislav Baitcaev	(North Ossetia–Alania) Alan Khugaev	(Chechnya) Anzor Khizriev

=== Women's freestyle results ===
Event	Gold	Silver	Bronze
48 kg	(Japan) Yuki Irie	(Russia) Nadezhda Fedorova	(Russia) Darya Leksina
48 kg	(Japan) Yuki Irie	(Russia) Nadezhda Fedorova	(Mongolia) Narangerel Erdenesukh
53 kg	(Russia) Liubov Salnikova	(Japan) Chiho Hamada	(Russia) Maria Gurova
53 kg	(Russia) Liubov Salnikova	(Japan) Chiho Hamada	(Mongolia) Erdenechimegiin Sumiyaa
55 kg	(Russia) Nadezhda Tretyakova	(Japan) Anri Kimura	(Russia) Alina Kazimova
55 kg	(Russia) Nadezhda Tretyakova	(Japan) Anri Kimura	(Russia) Victoriya Shulgina
58 kg	(Mongolia) Pürevdorjiin Orkhon	(Japan) Kaori Icho	(Mongolia) Sükheegiin Tserenchimed
58 kg	(Mongolia) Pürevdorjiin Orkhon	(Japan) Kaori Icho	(Mongolia) Baatarjavyn Shoovdor
60 kg	(Russia) Yuliya Prontsevich	(Kazakhstan) Ayaulym Kasymova	(Russia) Svetlana Lipatova
60 kg	(Russia) Yuliya Prontsevich	(Kazakhstan) Ayaulym Kasymova	(Russia) Natalya Fedoseeva
63 kg	(Russia) Inna Trazhukova	(Japan) Ayaka Ito	(Kazakhstan) Yekaterina Larionova
63 kg	(Russia) Inna Trazhukova	(Japan) Ayaka Ito	(Russia) Darima Sanzheeva
69 kg	(Kazakhstan) Elmira Syzdykova	(Italy) Dalma Caneva	(Mongolia) Tumentsetseg Sharkhuu
69 kg	(Kazakhstan) Elmira Syzdykova	(Italy) Dalma Caneva	(Russia) Arina Babkina
75 kg	(Mongolia) Badrakhyn Odonchimeg	(Russia) Elena Perepelkina	(Russia) Alena Afanasyeva
75 kg	(Mongolia) Badrakhyn Odonchimeg	(Russia) Elena Perepelkina	(Mongolia) Ochirbatyn Burmaa

== Participating nations ==
- Cyprus
- Greece
- Italy
- Japan
- Kazakhstan
- Mongolia
- Russia (without ethnics & Islamic republics)
- Slovakia
- United States
