= Rei Higuchi =

Japanese freestyle wrestler (born 1996)

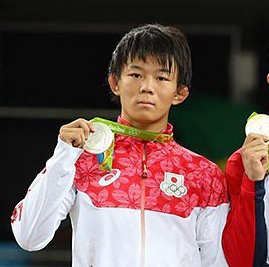
- Higuchi at the 2016 Summer Olympics

Personal information
- Nationality: Japan
- Born: 樋口黎; January 28, 1996 (age 30) Japan
- Height: 163 cm (5 ft 4 in)

Sport
- Country: Japan
- Sport: Wrestling
- Weight class: 61 kg
- Event: Freestyle
- Club: Nippon Sport Science University;Tokyo
- Coached by: Kenichi Yumoto Kazuhito Sakae Takahiro Wada

Achievements and titles
- Olympic finals: (silver) (2016) (gold) (2024)
- World finals: (gold) (2022) (silver) (2023)
- Regional finals: (gold) (2022)
Medal record
Men's freestyle wrestling
Representing Japan
Olympic Games
Gold medal – first place	2024 Paris	57 kg
Silver medal – second place	2016 Rio de Janeiro	57 kg
World Championships
Gold medal – first place	2022 Belgrade	61 kg
Silver medal – second place	2023 Belgrade	57 kg
Asian Championships
Gold medal – first place	2022 Ulaanbaatar	61 kg
Bronze medal – third place	2017 New Delhi	61 kg
Grand Prix
Gold medal – first place	2024 Budapest	57 kg
Bronze medal – third place	2017 Krasnoyarsk	61 kg
Gold medal – first place	2016 Spala	57 kg
Gold medal – first place	2016 Skopje	61 kg
Bronze medal – third place	2015 Ulaanbaatar	57 kg
Bronze medal – third place	2015 Ulan-Ude	61 kg
World U23 Championships
Gold medal – first place	2018 Bucharest	65 kg

Rei Higuchi (Japanese: 樋口黎; born 28 January 1996) is a Japanese freestyle wrestler. He won the gold medal in the men's freestyle 57 kg event at the 2024 Summer Olympics in Paris, France. He won a silver medal in the 57 kg division at the 2016 Olympics. He won the gold medal in the 61 kg event at the 2022 World Wrestling Championships held in Belgrade, Serbia.

== Career ==
Higuchi studies at the Nippon Sport Science University. He fractured his right hand in October 2015, but won the All Japan Tournament in December that year.

Higuchi received a silver medal at the 2016 Olympic Games after a controversial loss in the final to Vladimer Khinchegashvili. Khinchegashvili secured a 4-3 victory after trailing Higuchi 3-2 late in the match. The turning point came when Higuchi was put on the 30-second activity clock due to passivity with 1:13 remaining. After Higuchi failed to score within those 30 seconds, Khinchegashvili was automatically awarded a point to take the lead on tiebreaking criteria (3-3). Higuchi's corner challenged the shot clock ruling, but the challenge was lost, and another point was awarded to Khinchegashvili's score (4-3).

On 28 January 2017, Higuchi competed at the Golden Grand Prix Ivan Yarygin 2017. In qualification, he was eliminated by Gadzhimurad Rashidov of Russia, but wrestled back to win a bronze medal against Bulat Batoev of Russia. On September 18, 2023, he won a silver medal in the 57-kilogram weight class at the 2023 World Wrestling Championships in Belgrade. In the final, he lost to Serbian wrestler Stevan Mićić. In Paris 2024, he won the gold medal against Spencer Lee of the United States.
