= Joe Colon (wrestler) =

American wrestler (born 1991)

Personal information
- Full name: Joseph Daniel Colon
- Born: January 22, 1991 (age 35) Clear Lake, Iowa, U.S.

Sport
- Country: United States
- Sport: Wrestling
- Events: Freestyle and Folkstyle
- College team: Northern Iowa
- Club: Titan Mercury Wrestling Club
- Team: USA
Medal record
Men's freestyle wrestling
Representing the United States
World Championships
Bronze medal – third place	2018 Budapest	61 kg
World Cup
Gold medal – first place	2018 Iowa City	Team
Pan American Championships
Gold medal – first place	2018 Lima	61 kg
Gold medal – first place	2019 Buenos Aires	61 kg
Men's collegiate wrestling
Representing the Northern Iowa Panthers
NCAA Division I Championships
Bronze medal – third place	2014 Oklahoma City	133 lb
Representing Iowa Central CC
NJCAA Championships
Gold medal – first place	2010 Des Moines	125 lb

Joseph Daniel Colon (born January 22, 1991) is an American former folkstyle and freestyle wrestler. He represented the United States in freestyle wrestling at 61 kg at the 2018 World Championships, where he won a bronze medal. Colon wrestled collegiately at the University of Northern Iowa, where he was an NCAA All-American.

== High school ==
Colon attended Clear Lake High School in Clear Lake, Iowa. As a high school wrestler, Colon was a two-time Iowa state champion.

== College ==
He first attended Iowa Central Community College, where he was a NJCAA national champion in 2010 at 125-pounds and was named the NJCAA Tournament Outstanding wrestler. Colon then transferred to Northern Iowa, where he was an NCAA All-American at the 2014 NCAA Division I championships, placing third at 133-pounds.

== Senior level ==
In 2018, Colon was the representative for the United States freestyle wrestling World Team at 61 kg. At the 2018 World Championships, Colon earned a bronze medal.
