= Tümenbilegiin Tüvshintulga =

Mongolian freestyle wrestler

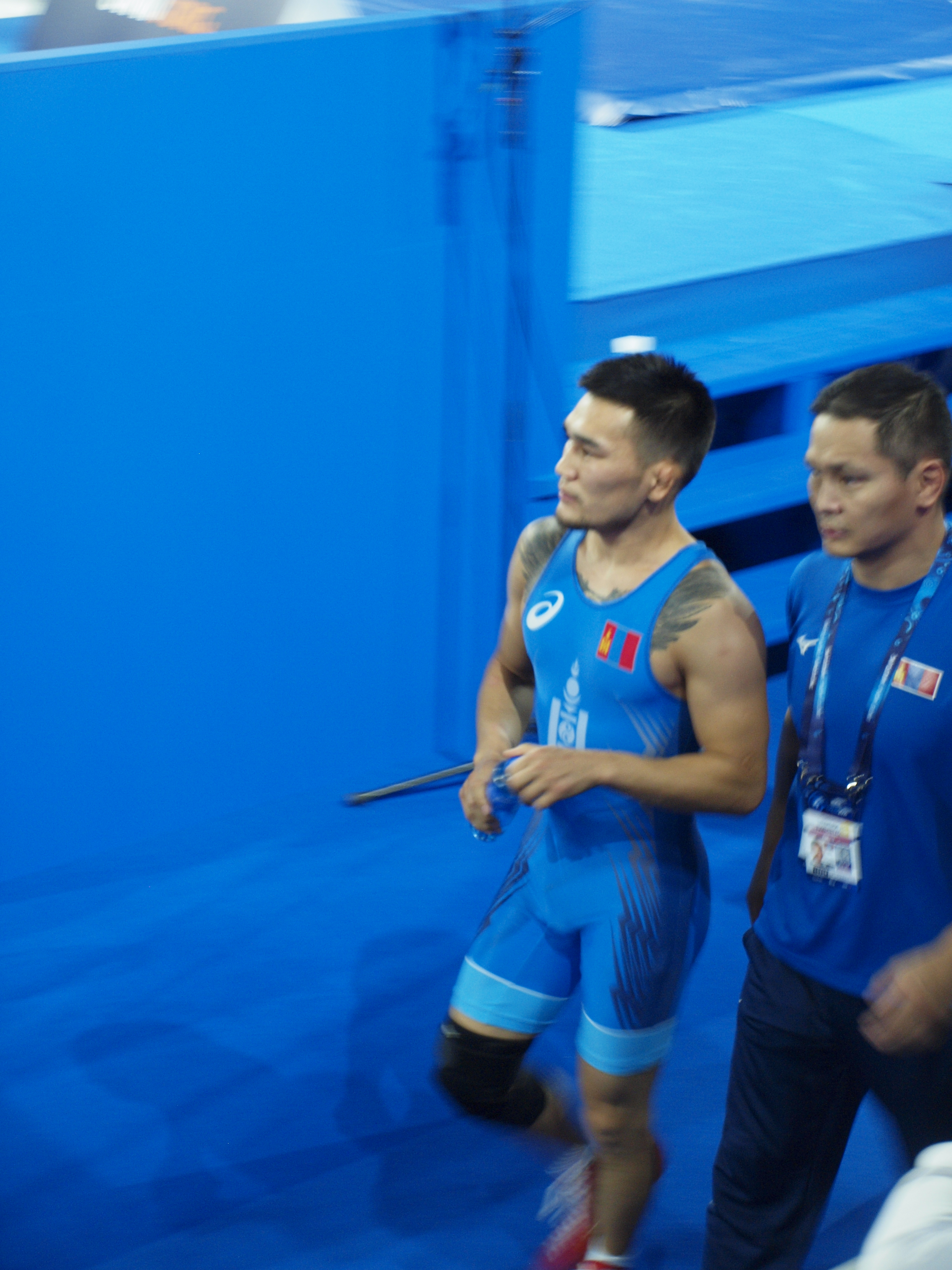
- Tümenbilegiin Tüvshintulga at the 2021 World Wrestling Championships in Oslo, Norway

Personal information
- Native name: Түмэнбилэгийн Түвшинтулга
- Nationality: Mongolia
- Born: 22 January 1991 (age 35) Teshig, Bulgan, Mongolia
- Height: 162 cm (5 ft 4 in)
- Website: Instagram Profile

Sport
- Country: Mongolia
- Sport: Wrestling
- Weight class: 61 kg
- Event: Freestyle

Achievements and titles
- World finals: (bronze) (2018)
- Regional finals: (bronze) (2016) (bronze) (2023)
Medal record
Men's freestyle wrestling
Representing Mongolia
World Championships
| Bronze medal – third place | 2018 Budapest | 61 kg |
Asian Championships
| Bronze medal – third place | 2016 Bangkok | 61 kg |
| Bronze medal – third place | 2023 Astana | 61 kg |
Golden Grand Prix Ivan Yarygin
| Silver medal – second place | 2023 Krasnoyarsk | 61 kg |
| Bronze medal – third place | 2018 Krasnoyarsk | 61 kg |
Yasar Dogu Tournament
| Silver medal – second place | 2016 Istanbul | 61 kg |
Grand Prix
| Gold medal – first place | 2019 Taraz | 57kg |
| Gold medal – first place | 2025 Ulaanbaatar | 61 kg |
World University Championships
| Gold medal – first place | 2014 Pecs | 61kg |
Asian Cadets Championships
| Silver medal – second place | 2009 Pune | 54 kg |

Tuvshintulga Tumenbileg (Mongolian: Түмэнбилэгийн Түвшинтулга; born 22 January 1991) is a Mongolian wrestler.

In 2018, he won the bronze medal match against Beka Lomtadze in the 61 kg event at the World Wrestling Championships held in Budapest, Hungary.

At the 13th International Freestyle Wrestling Tournament for the Prizes of the Buryatia's Governor in 2018 Tuvshintulga beat the 2012 Olympic Champion Dzhamal Otarsultanov of Russia a score 6–5.

== Major results ==
| Year | Competition | Venue | Position | Event | Notes |
Representing Mongolia
| 2018 | World Championships | Budapest, Hungary | 3rd | Freestyle 61 kg | |
| 2021 | World Championships | Oslo, Norway | 5th | Freestyle 61 kg | |
| 2014 | Asian Games | Incheon, Korea | 5th | Freestyle 61 kg | |
| 2016 | Asian Continental Championships | Bangkok, Thailand | 3rd | Freestyle 61 kg | |
| 2023 | Asian Continental Championship | Astana, Kazakhstan | 3rd | Freestyle 61 kg | |
