= 2015 Russian National Freestyle Wrestling Championships =

2015 Russian Nationals
- Host city: Kaspiysk, Dagestan, Russia
- Dates: May 8–10
- Stadium: Ali Aliyev Sport Complex

Champions
- Freestyle: Dagestan

The Russian National Freestyle Wrestling Championships 2015 (World Team Trials) were held in Kaspiysk, Dagestan, Russia in the Ali Aliyev Center, from 8–10 May 2015. The championships were attended by 6–7,000 spectators.

== Medal overview ==
=== Medal table ===
Rank	Team	Gold	Silver	Bronze	Total
1	Dagestan	3	2	8	13
2	(North Ossetia–Alania) North Ossetia-Alania	1	4	2	7
3	Kabardino-Balkaria	1	0	2	3
4	Buryatia	1	0	1	2
5	Sakha Republic	1	0	0	1
5	Stavropol Krai	1	0	0	1
7	Chechnya	0	1	4	5
8	Krasnoyarsk Krai	0	1	0	1
Totals (8 entries)		8	8	17	33

=== Men's freestyle ===
Event	Gold	Silver	Bronze
57 kg	(Sakha Republic) Viktor Lebedev	(Kabardino-Balkaria) Ismail Musukaev	(North Ossetia–Alania) Azamat Tuskaev
57 kg	(Sakha Republic) Viktor Lebedev	(Kabardino-Balkaria) Ismail Musukaev	(Dagestan) Nariman Israpilov
61 kg	(Buryatia) Aleksandr Bogomoev	(Chechnya) Dzhamal Otarsultanov	(Dagestan) Gadzhimurad Rashidov
61 kg	(Buryatia) Aleksandr Bogomoev	(Chechnya) Dzhamal Otarsultanov	(Dagestan) Rustam Abdurashidov
65 kg	(Dagestan) Ilyas Bekbulatov	(North Ossetia–Alania) Soslan Ramonov	(Chechnya) Akhmed Chakaev
65 kg	(Dagestan) Ilyas Bekbulatov	(North Ossetia–Alania) Soslan Ramonov	(Dagestan) Magomed Kurbanaliev
70 kg	(Stavropol Krai) Magomedrasul Gazimagomedov	(Krasnoyarsk Krai) Israil Kasumov	(Buryatia) Yevgeny Zherbaev
70 kg	(Stavropol Krai) Magomedrasul Gazimagomedov	(Krasnoyarsk Krai) Israil Kasumov	(Chechnya) Rasul Dzhukayev
74 kg	(Kabardino-Balkaria) Aniuar Geduev	(North Ossetia–Alania) Stanislav Khachirov	(Dagestan) Akhmed Gadzhimagomedov
74 kg	(Kabardino-Balkaria) Aniuar Geduev	(North Ossetia–Alania) Stanislav Khachirov	(Dagestan) Khabib Batyrov
86 kg	(Dagestan) Abdulrashid Sadulaev	(Dagestan) Shamil Kudiyamagomedov	(Kabardino-Balkaria) Anzor Urishev
86 kg	(Dagestan) Abdulrashid Sadulaev	(Dagestan) Shamil Kudiyamagomedov	(North Ossetia–Alania) Soslan Ktsoyev
97 kg	(Dagestan) Abdusalam Gadisov	(North Ossetia–Alania) Vladislav Baitcaev	(Dagestan) Magomed Ibragimov
97 kg	(Dagestan) Abdusalam Gadisov	(North Ossetia–Alania) Vladislav Baitcaev	(Chechnya) Adlan Ibragimov
125 kg	(North Ossetia–Alania) Khadzhimurat Gatsalov	(North Ossetia–Alania) Eduard Bazrov	(Chechnya) Bekhan Dukaev
125 kg	(North Ossetia–Alania) Khadzhimurat Gatsalov	(North Ossetia–Alania) Eduard Bazrov	(Kabardino-Balkaria) Muradin Kushkhov

== Results Matches ==
- 57 kg
  - Final: (Sakha Republic) Viktor Lebedev def. (Dagestan) Ismail Musukaev, 2–1
  - Bronze medal: (North Ossetia–Alania) Azamat Tuskaev def. (Sakha Republic) Viktor Rassadin, 3–1
  - Bronze medal: (Dagestan) Nariman Israpilov def. (Abkhazia) – (Moscow Oblast) Rustam Ampar, by Fall, 2:09
- 61 kg
  - Final: (Buryatia) Aleksandr Bogomoev def. (Chechnya) Dzhamal Otarsultanov, 3–1
  - Bronze medal: (Dagestan) Gadzhimurad Rashidov def. (Buryatia) Bato Badmaev, 3–2
  - Bronze medal: (Dagestan) Rustam Abdurashidov def. (Krasnoyarsk Krai) Nachyn Kuular, by Fall, 1:37
- 65 kg
  - Final: (Dagestan) Ilyas Bekbulatov def. (North Ossetia–Alania) Soslan Ramonov, 4–4
  - Bronze medal: (Chechnya) Akhmed Chakaev def. (Dagestan) Alibeggadzhi Emeev, 3–2
  - Bronze medal: (Dagestan) Magomed Kurbanaliev def. (Dagestan) Rasul Murtazaliev, 3–2
- 70 kg
  - Final: (Stavropol Krai) Magomedrasul Gazimagomedov def. (Krasnoyarsk Krai) Israil Kasumov, 9–0
  - Bronze medal: (Buryatia) Yevgeny Zherbaev def. (Dagestan) Magomedkhabib Kadimagomedov, by TF, 15–4
  - Bronze medal: (Chechnya) Rasul Dzhukayev def. (North Ossetia–Alania) Alan Gogaev, 2–0
- 74 kg
  - Final: (Kabardino-Balkaria) Aniuar Geduev def. (North Ossetia–Alania) Stanislav Khachirov, 6–0
  - Bronze medal: (Dagestan) Akhmed Gadzhimagomedov def. (North Ossetia–Alania) Kakhaber Khubezhty, 7–2
  - Bronze medal: (Dagestan) Khabib Batyrov def. (Dagestan) Iakub Shikhdzamalov, 3–1
- 86 kg
  - Final: (Dagestan) Abdulrashid Sadulaev def. (Dagestan) Shamil Kudiyamagomedov, 4–0
  - Bronze medal: (Kabardino-Balkaria) Anzor Urishev def. (Dagestan) Akhmed Magomedov, 3–0
  - Bronze medal: (North Ossetia–Alania) Soslan Ktsoyev def. (North Ossetia–Alania) Vladislav Valiev. 3–0
- 97 kg
  - Final: (Dagestan) Abdusalam Gadisov def. (North Ossetia–Alania) Vladislav Baitcaev, 7–0
  - Bronze medal: (Dagestan) Magomed Ibragimov def. (Dagestan) Tazhudin Mukhtarov, TF, 11–0
  - Bronze medal: (Chechnya) Adlan Ibragimov def. (Saint Petersburg) Stanislav Gadzhiev, 6–3
- 125 kg
  - Final: (North Ossetia–Alania) Khadzhimurat Gatsalov def. (North Ossetia–Alania) Eduard Bazrov, by Fall, 2:25
  - Bronze medal: (Chechnya) Bekhan Dukaev def. (North Ossetia–Alania) Felix Tsarikayev, 8–0
  - Bronze medal: (Kabardino-Balkaria) Muradin Kushkhov def. (Dagestan) Asadullah Ibragimov, by TF, 12–1

== See also ==
- 2015 Russian National Greco-Roman Wrestling Championships
- Soviet and Russian results in men's freestyle wrestling
