= 2017 Golden Grand Prix Ivan Yarygin =

2017 wrestling event held in Krasnoyarsk, Russia

Ivan Yarygin 2017
- Host city: Krasnoyarsk, Russia
- Dates: January 27–29
- Stadium: Yenisei Football Arena

Champions
- Freestyle: Dagestan
- Women: Russia

The XXVIII Golden Grand Prix Ivan Yarygin 2017, also known as Ivan Yarygin (Yariguin) 2017 was a wrestling event held in Krasnoyarsk, Russia between 27 and 29 January 2017.

This international tournament included competition in both Freestyle wrestling. This Grand Prix was held in honor of 2-time Olympic Champion Ivan Yarygin.

Kyle Snyder (Olympic champion), Cody Brewer and Nick Gwiazdowski (NCAA All-American), Gadzhimurad Rashidov (European champion), Rei Higuchi (Olympic silver medalist) and Sohsuke Takatani (World 2014 runner-up) competed in this tournament.

== Medal overview ==
=== Medal table ===
Rank	Nation	Gold	Silver	Bronze	Total
1	Dagestan	5	3	3	11
2	Japan	4	0	3	7
3	Mongolia	2	2	6	10
4	United States	2	1	1	4
5	(North Ossetia–Alania) North Ossetia-Alania	1	3	4	8
6	Krasnoyarsk Krai	1	0	1	2
7	Kyrgyzstan	1	0	0	1
8	Russia	0	5	5	10
9	Iran	0	1	3	4
10	Chechnya	0	1	1	2
11	Bulgaria	0	0	2	2
12	Azerbaijan	0	0	1	1
12	Karachay-Cherkessia	0	0	1	1
12	Sakha Republic	0	0	1	1
Totals (14 entries)		16	16	32	64

=== Men's freestyle ===
Event	Gold	Silver	Bronze
57 kg	(Dagestan) Zaur Uguev	(Dagestan) Artem Gebekov	(Dagestan) Zelimkhan Abakarov
57 kg	(Dagestan) Zaur Uguev	(Dagestan) Artem Gebekov	(Dagestan) Nariman Israpilov
61 kg	(Dagestan) Akhmed Chakaev	(Dagestan) Gadzhimurad Rashidov	(Japan) Rei Higuchi
61 kg	(Dagestan) Akhmed Chakaev	(Dagestan) Gadzhimurad Rashidov	(Sakha Republic) Viktor Rassadin
65 kg	(Dagestan) Ilyas Bekbulatov	(North Ossetia–Alania) Chermen Valiev	(North Ossetia–Alania) Alan Gogaev
65 kg	(Dagestan) Ilyas Bekbulatov	(North Ossetia–Alania) Chermen Valiev	(Iran) Mohammad Mehdi Yeganeh-Jafari
70 kg	(Krasnoyarsk Krai) Israil Kasumov	(North Ossetia–Alania) Zaurbek Sidakov	(Dagestan) Magomedkhabib Kadimagomedov
70 kg	(Krasnoyarsk Krai) Israil Kasumov	(North Ossetia–Alania) Zaurbek Sidakov	(Karachay-Cherkessia) Alibek Akbaev
74 kg	(Dagestan) Akhmed Gadzhimagomedov	(North Ossetia–Alania) Atsamaz Sanakoev	(North Ossetia–Alania) Khakhaber Khubezhti
74 kg	(Dagestan) Akhmed Gadzhimagomedov	(North Ossetia–Alania) Atsamaz Sanakoev	(North Ossetia–Alania) Radik Valiev
86 kg	(Dagestan) Dauren Kurugliev	(Iran) Mohammad Javad Ebrahimi	(Chechnya) Akhmed Magamaev
86 kg	(Dagestan) Dauren Kurugliev	(Iran) Mohammad Javad Ebrahimi	(North Ossetia–Alania) Vladislav Valiev
97 kg	(United States) Kyle Snyder	(Dagestan) Rasul Magomedov	(Krasnoyarsk Krai) Yuri Belonovski
97 kg	(United States) Kyle Snyder	(Dagestan) Rasul Magomedov	(Iran) Hossein Ramezanian
125 kg	(North Ossetia–Alania) Alan Khugaev	(Chechnya) Anzor Boltukaev	(Iran) Jaber Sadeghzadeh
125 kg	(North Ossetia–Alania) Alan Khugaev	(Chechnya) Anzor Boltukaev	(Mongolia) Natsagsürengiin Zolboo

=== Women's freestyle ===
Event	Gold	Silver	Bronze
48 kg	(Japan) Yui Susaki	(Russia) Daria Leksina	(Bulgaria) Miglena Selishka
48 kg	(Japan) Yui Susaki	(Russia) Daria Leksina	(Russia) Milana Dadasheva
53 kg	(Japan) Mayu Mukaida	(Mongolia) Davaasükhiin Otgontsetseg	(Russia) Ekaterina Poleshchuk
53 kg	(Japan) Mayu Mukaida	(Mongolia) Davaasükhiin Otgontsetseg	(Mongolia) Erdenechimegiin Sumiyaa
55 kg	(Japan) Sae Nanjo	(United States) Sarah Hildebrandt	(Mongolia) Altantsetsegiin Battsetseg
55 kg	(Japan) Sae Nanjo	(United States) Sarah Hildebrandt	(Russia) Aleksandra Andreeva
58 kg	(Kyrgyzstan) Aisuluu Tynybekova	(Russia) Veronika Chumikova	(Mongolia) Enkhbatyn Gantuya
58 kg	(Kyrgyzstan) Aisuluu Tynybekova	(Russia) Veronika Chumikova	(Japan) Akie Hanai
60 kg	(Japan) Katsuki Sakagami	(Russia) Yulia Prontsevich	(Russia) Zhargalma Tsyrenova
60 kg	(Japan) Katsuki Sakagami	(Russia) Yulia Prontsevich	(United States) Allison Ragan
63 kg	(Mongolia) Pürevdorjiin Orkhon	(Russia) Inna Trazhukova	(Bulgaria) Taybe Yusein
63 kg	(Mongolia) Pürevdorjiin Orkhon	(Russia) Inna Trazhukova	(Japan) Ayaka Ito
69 kg	(United States) Tamyra Mensah	(Mongolia) Ochirbatyn Nasanburmaa	(Azerbaijan) Elis Manolova
69 kg	(United States) Tamyra Mensah	(Mongolia) Ochirbatyn Nasanburmaa	(Mongolia) Sharkhuugiin Tumentsetseg
75 kg	(Mongolia) Gan-Ochiryn Urtnasan	(Russia) Alena Starodubtseva	(Russia) Elena Perepelkina
75 kg	(Mongolia) Gan-Ochiryn Urtnasan	(Russia) Alena Starodubtseva	(Mongolia) Tserendorjiin Bayarzaya

== Participating nations ==
347 competitors from 15 nations participated.

- Azerbaijan (1)
- Belarus (3)
- Bulgaria (3)
- China (8)
- Germany (2)
- Iran (7)
- Italy (3)
- Japan (17)
- Kazakhstan (27)
- Kyrgyzstan (10)
- Mongolia (39)
- Romania (1)
- Russia (214)
- United States (7)
- Uzbekistan (5)
