= 2018 World Wrestling Championships =

15th edition of World Wrestling Championships held in Hungary

- Host city: Budapest, Hungary
- Dates: 20–28 October 2018
- Stadium: László Papp Budapest Sports Arena

Champions
- Freestyle: Russia
- Greco-Roman: Russia
- Women: Japan

The 2018 World Wrestling Championships were the 15th edition of World Wrestling Championships of combined events and were held from 20 to 28 October in Budapest, Hungary.

Russia claimed 10 gold medals, 1 silver medal and 2 bronze medals, its best ever overall result in the post-Soviet era. In Greco-Roman Wrestling Russian athletes showed the best ever result since 1990.

== Medal table ==
| Rank | Nation | Gold | Silver | Bronze | Total |
|---|---|---|---|---|---|
| 1 | Russia | 10 | 1 | 2 | 13 |
| 2 | Japan | 5 | 1 | 4 | 10 |
| 3 | United States | 4 | 3 | 5 | 12 |
| 4 | Turkey | 1 | 4 | 4 | 9 |
| 5 | Azerbaijan | 1 | 2 | 2 | 5 |
| 6 | Bulgaria | 1 | 2 | 1 | 4 |
| 6 | Hungary | 1 | 2 | 1 | 4 |
| 8 | China | 1 | 1 | 5 | 7 |
| 9 | Georgia | 1 | 1 | 4 | 6 |
| 10 | Ukraine | 1 | 1 | 3 | 5 |
| 11 | Canada | 1 | 1 | 2 | 4 |
| 12 | Cuba | 1 | 0 | 4 | 5 |
| 13 | Finland | 1 | 0 | 0 | 1 |
| 13 | Germany | 1 | 0 | 0 | 1 |
| 15 | Belarus | 0 | 2 | 2 | 4 |
| 16 | Kazakhstan | 0 | 1 | 2 | 3 |
| 16 | Mongolia | 0 | 1 | 2 | 3 |
| 16 | Serbia | 0 | 1 | 2 | 3 |
| 19 | India | 0 | 1 | 1 | 2 |
| 19 | Uzbekistan | 0 | 1 | 1 | 2 |
| 21 | Bahrain | 0 | 1 | 0 | 1 |
| 21 | France | 0 | 1 | 0 | 1 |
| 21 | Kyrgyzstan | 0 | 1 | 0 | 1 |
| 21 | Moldova | 0 | 1 | 0 | 1 |
| 25 | Iran | 0 | 0 | 4 | 4 |
| 26 | Armenia | 0 | 0 | 2 | 2 |
| 26 | South Korea | 0 | 0 | 2 | 2 |
| 28 | Austria | 0 | 0 | 1 | 1 |
| 28 | Italy | 0 | 0 | 1 | 1 |
| 28 | North Korea | 0 | 0 | 1 | 1 |
| 28 | Poland | 0 | 0 | 1 | 1 |
| 28 | Spain | 0 | 0 | 1 | 1 |
| Totals (32 entries) | | 30 | 30 | 60 | 120 |

== Team ranking ==
| Rank | Men's freestyle | | Men's Greco-Roman | | Women's freestyle | |
| Rank | Team | Points | Team | Points | Team | Points |
|---|---|---|---|---|---|---|
| 1 | Russia | 178 | Russia | 178 | Japan | 156 |
| 2 | United States | 150 | Hungary | 83 | China | 119 |
| 3 | Georgia | 105 | Turkey | 75 | United States | 103 |
| 4 | Cuba | 67 | Azerbaijan | 60 | Canada | 89 |
| 5 | Japan | 67 | Serbia | 60 | Mongolia | 71 |
| 6 | Iran | 65 | Armenia | 56 | Ukraine | 59 |
| 7 | Mongolia | 57 | Germany | 49 | Turkey | 55 |
| 8 | Turkey | 53 | China | 49 | India | 51 |
| 9 | Azerbaijan | 44 | Kyrgyzstan | 42 | Bulgaria | 47 |
| 10 | Belarus | 41 | Ukraine | 39 | Azerbaijan | 41 |

== Medal summary ==
=== Men's freestyle ===
| Event | Gold | Silver | Bronze |
|---|---|---|---|
| 57 kg | Zaur Uguev; Russia | Nurislam Sanayev; Kazakhstan | Yuki Takahashi; Japan |
| 57 kg | Zaur Uguev; Russia | Nurislam Sanayev; Kazakhstan | Süleyman Atlı; Turkey |
| 61 kg | Yowlys Bonne; Cuba | Gadzhimurad Rashidov; Russia | Joe Colon; United States |
| 61 kg | Yowlys Bonne; Cuba | Gadzhimurad Rashidov; Russia | Tümenbilegiin Tüvshintulga; Mongolia |
| 65 kg | Takuto Otoguro; Japan | Bajrang Punia; India | Akhmed Chakaev; Russia |
| 65 kg | Takuto Otoguro; Japan | Bajrang Punia; India | Alejandro Valdés; Cuba |
| 70 kg | Magomedrasul Gazimagomedov; Russia | Adam Batirov; Bahrain | Franklin Marén; Cuba |
| 70 kg | Magomedrasul Gazimagomedov; Russia | Adam Batirov; Bahrain | Zurabi Iakobishvili; Georgia |
| 74 kg | Zaurbek Sidakov; Russia | Avtandil Kentchadze; Georgia | Jordan Burroughs; United States |
| 74 kg | Zaurbek Sidakov; Russia | Avtandil Kentchadze; Georgia | Bekzod Abdurakhmonov; Uzbekistan |
| 79 kg | Kyle Dake; United States | Jabrayil Hasanov; Azerbaijan | Akhmed Gadzhimagomedov; Russia |
| 79 kg | Kyle Dake; United States | Jabrayil Hasanov; Azerbaijan | Ali Shabanau; Belarus |
| 86 kg | David Taylor; United States | Fatih Erdin; Turkey | Taimuraz Friev; Spain |
| 86 kg | David Taylor; United States | Fatih Erdin; Turkey | Hassan Yazdani; Iran |
| 92 kg | J'den Cox; United States | Ivan Yankouski; Belarus | Atsushi Matsumoto; Japan |
| 92 kg | J'den Cox; United States | Ivan Yankouski; Belarus | Alireza Karimi; Iran |
| 97 kg | Abdulrashid Sadulaev; Russia | Kyle Snyder; United States | Abraham Conyedo; Italy |
| 97 kg | Abdulrashid Sadulaev; Russia | Kyle Snyder; United States | Elizbar Odikadze; Georgia |
| 125 kg | Geno Petriashvili; Georgia | Deng Zhiwei; China | Nick Gwiazdowski; United States |
| 125 kg | Geno Petriashvili; Georgia | Deng Zhiwei; China | Parviz Hadi; Iran |

=== Men's Greco-Roman ===
| Event | Gold | Silver | Bronze |
|---|---|---|---|
| 55 kg | Eldaniz Azizli; Azerbaijan | Zholaman Sharshenbekov; Kyrgyzstan | Ekrem Öztürk; Turkey |
| 55 kg | Eldaniz Azizli; Azerbaijan | Zholaman Sharshenbekov; Kyrgyzstan | Nugzari Tsurtsumia; Georgia |
| 60 kg | Sergey Emelin; Russia | Victor Ciobanu; Moldova | Walihan Sailike; China |
| 60 kg | Sergey Emelin; Russia | Victor Ciobanu; Moldova | Aidos Sultangali; Kazakhstan |
| 63 kg | Stepan Maryanyan; Russia | Elmurat Tasmuradov; Uzbekistan | Lenur Temirov; Ukraine |
| 63 kg | Stepan Maryanyan; Russia | Elmurat Tasmuradov; Uzbekistan | Rahman Bilici; Turkey |
| 67 kg | Artem Surkov; Russia | Davor Štefanek; Serbia | Meirzhan Shermakhanbet; Kazakhstan |
| 67 kg | Artem Surkov; Russia | Davor Štefanek; Serbia | Gevorg Sahakyan; Poland |
| 72 kg | Frank Stäbler; Germany | Bálint Korpási; Hungary | Aik Mnatsakanian; Bulgaria |
| 72 kg | Frank Stäbler; Germany | Bálint Korpási; Hungary | Rasul Chunayev; Azerbaijan |
| 77 kg | Aleksandr Chekhirkin; Russia | Tamás Lőrincz; Hungary | Kim Hyeon-woo; South Korea |
| 77 kg | Aleksandr Chekhirkin; Russia | Tamás Lőrincz; Hungary | Viktor Nemeš; Serbia |
| 82 kg | Péter Bácsi; Hungary | Emrah Kuş; Turkey | Maksim Manukyan; Armenia |
| 82 kg | Péter Bácsi; Hungary | Emrah Kuş; Turkey | Viktar Sasunouski; Belarus |
| 87 kg | Metehan Başar; Turkey | Zhan Beleniuk; Ukraine | Artur Shahinyan; Armenia |
| 87 kg | Metehan Başar; Turkey | Zhan Beleniuk; Ukraine | Roberti Kobliashvili; Georgia |
| 97 kg | Musa Evloev; Russia | Kiril Milov; Bulgaria | Mikheil Kajaia; Serbia |
| 97 kg | Musa Evloev; Russia | Kiril Milov; Bulgaria | Mehdi Aliyari; Iran |
| 130 kg | Sergey Semenov; Russia | Adam Coon; United States | Óscar Pino; Cuba |
| 130 kg | Sergey Semenov; Russia | Adam Coon; United States | Kim Min-seok; South Korea |

=== Women's freestyle ===
| Event | Gold | Silver | Bronze |
|---|---|---|---|
| 50 kg | Yui Susaki; Japan | Mariya Stadnik; Azerbaijan | Oksana Livach; Ukraine |
| 50 kg | Yui Susaki; Japan | Mariya Stadnik; Azerbaijan | Sun Yanan; China |
| 53 kg | Haruna Okuno; Japan | Sarah Hildebrandt; United States | Diana Weicker; Canada |
| 53 kg | Haruna Okuno; Japan | Sarah Hildebrandt; United States | Pang Qianyu; China |
| 55 kg | Mayu Mukaida; Japan | Zalina Sidakova; Belarus | Lianna Montero; Cuba |
| 55 kg | Mayu Mukaida; Japan | Zalina Sidakova; Belarus | Jong Myong-suk; North Korea |
| 57 kg | Rong Ningning; China | Bilyana Dudova; Bulgaria | Emese Barka; Hungary |
| 57 kg | Rong Ningning; China | Bilyana Dudova; Bulgaria | Pooja Dhanda; India |
| 59 kg | Risako Kawai; Japan | Elif Jale Yeşilırmak; Turkey | Pei Xingru; China |
| 59 kg | Risako Kawai; Japan | Elif Jale Yeşilırmak; Turkey | Baatarjavyn Shoovdor; Mongolia |
| 62 kg | Taybe Yusein; Bulgaria | Yukako Kawai; Japan | Yuliya Tkach; Ukraine |
| 62 kg | Taybe Yusein; Bulgaria | Yukako Kawai; Japan | Mallory Velte; United States |
| 65 kg | Petra Olli; Finland | Danielle Lappage; Canada | Ayana Gempei; Japan |
| 65 kg | Petra Olli; Finland | Danielle Lappage; Canada | Irina Netreba; Azerbaijan |
| 68 kg | Alla Cherkasova; Ukraine | Koumba Larroque; France | Zhou Feng; China |
| 68 kg | Alla Cherkasova; Ukraine | Koumba Larroque; France | Tamyra Mensah-Stock; United States |
| 72 kg | Justina Di Stasio; Canada | Ochirbatyn Nasanburmaa; Mongolia | Martina Kuenz; Austria |
| 72 kg | Justina Di Stasio; Canada | Ochirbatyn Nasanburmaa; Mongolia | Buse Tosun; Turkey |
| 76 kg | Adeline Gray; United States | Yasemin Adar; Turkey | Hiroe Minagawa; Japan |
| 76 kg | Adeline Gray; United States | Yasemin Adar; Turkey | Erica Wiebe; Canada |

== Participating nations ==
785 competitors from 88 nations participated.

- Algeria (4)
- American Samoa (2)
- Angola (1)
- Argentina (2)
- Armenia (14)
- Australia (1)
- Austria (10)
- Azerbaijan (28)
- Bahrain (1)
- Belarus (28)
- Bolivia (2)
- Brazil (6)
- Bulgaria (17)
- Burundi (1)
- Cameroon (2)
- Canada (20)
- Chile (1)
- China (28)
- Chinese Taipei (6)
- Colombia (8)
- Croatia (4)
- Cuba (12)
- Czech Republic (7)
- Denmark (2)
- Ecuador (2)
- Egypt (5)
- Estonia (3)
- Finland (6)
- France (9)
- Georgia (20)
- Germany (18)
- Greece (4)
- Guam (4)
- Guatemala (2)
- Guinea (1)
- Guinea-Bissau (1)
- Hungary (30)
- India (30)
- Iran (20)
- Iraq (4)
- Israel (4)
- Italy (8)
- Jamaica (2)
- Japan (30)
- Jordan (2)
- Kazakhstan (29)
- Kyrgyzstan (11)
- Latvia (3)
- Lebanon (1)
- Liberia (1)
- Lithuania (9)
- Macedonia (2)
- Mexico (2)
- Moldova (13)
- Mongolia (20)
- Morocco (4)
- Nauru (1)
- Netherlands (2)
- New Zealand (1)
- Nigeria (4)
- North Korea (6)
- Norway (4)
- Palau (3)
- Palestine (1)
- Panama (1)
- Peru (3)
- Poland (19)
- Puerto Rico (5)
- Romania (11)
- Russia (30)
- Senegal (2)
- Serbia (8)
- Slovakia (5)
- Slovenia (1)
- South Korea (29)
- Spain (3)
- Sudan (2)
- Sweden (9)
- Switzerland (1)
- Tajikistan (1)
- Tunisia (1)
- Turkey (30)
- Turkmenistan (4)
- Ukraine (30)
- United States (30)
- Uzbekistan (17)
- Venezuela (8)
- Vietnam (6)
