= Aleksandr Bogomoev =

Russian freestyle wrestler (born 1989)

Aleksandr Bogomoev Александр Богомоев
Personal information
- Native name: Александр Павлович Богомоев
- Full name: Aleksandr Pavlovich Bogomoev
- Born: November 17, 1989 (age 36) Ust-Ordynsky, Irkutsk Oblast, Russia
- Height: 1.61 m (5 ft 3 in)

Sport
- Country: Russia
- Sport: Wrestling
- Weight class: 61 kg
- Event: Freestyle
- Club: High school sports of Buryatia
- Coached by: Valery Ivanov, Lev Bardamov, Alexander Vilisov
Medal record
Men's freestyle wrestling
Representing Russia
European Games
Gold medal – first place	2015 Baku	61 kg
European Championships
Gold medal – first place	2020 Rome	61 kg
World Cup
Gold medal – first place	2011 Makhachkala	60 kg
Silver medal – second place	2014 Los Angeles	61 kg
Russian National Championships
Gold medal – first place	2016 Yakutsk	57 kg
Gold medal – first place	2015 Kaspiisk	61kg
Gold medal – first place	2014 Yakutsk	61kg
Bronze medal – third place	2012 St.Petersburg	60kg
Bronze medal – third place	2011 Yakutsk	55kg
Golden Grand Prix Ivan Yarygin
Gold medal – first place	2020 Krasnoyarsk	61 kg
Gold medal – first place	2015 Krasnoyarsk	61 kg
Gold medal – first place	2016 Krasnoyarsk	57 kg
Silver medal – second place	2011 Krasnoyarsk	55 kg
Bronze medal – third place	2018 Krasnoyarsk	61 kg
Bronze medal – third place	2012 Krasnoyarsk	55 kg
Golden Grand Prix Baku
Bronze medal – third place	2015 Baku	61 kg

Aleksandr Pavlovich Bogomoev (Russian: Александр Павлович Богомоев; born 17 November 1989) is a Russian retired freestyle wrestler. 2011 World cup winner, 2015 European Games gold medalist and 2020 European champion. 3x Russian national champion.

He competed for the men's freestyle 61 kg at the World Wrestling Championships 2014 in Tashkent, Uzbekistan. He was eliminated in the quarterfinal rounds by Cuba's Yowlys Bonne.

He is a three-time winner of the Golden Grand Prix Ivan Yarygin (2015, 2016, 2020) and three-time Russian national champion (2014, 2015, 2016).

He is an international Master of Sports in freestyle wrestling.
