= 2018 Golden Grand Prix Ivan Yarygin =

Ivan Yarygin 2018
- Host city: Krasnoyarsk, Russia
- Dates: January 26–28
- Stadium: Yenisei Football Arena

Champions
- Freestyle: Dagestan
- Women: China

The XXIX Golden Grand Prix Ivan Yarygin 2018, also known as Ivan Yarygin (Yariguin) 2018 was a wrestling event held in Krasnoyarsk, Russia between 26 and 28 January 2018. It was held as the second of the ranking series of United World Wrestling, it is only men's freestyle ranking.

This international tournament includes competition in both men's and women's freestyle wrestling. This Grand Prix will be held in honor of the two time Olympic Champion, Ivan Yarygin. The Yarygin Grand Prix is the first UWW ranked tournament of the year 2018.

== Medal overview ==
=== Medal table ===
Rank	Nation	Gold	Silver	Bronze	Total
1	Dagestan	6	2	0	8
2	China	5	2	3	10
3	United States	3	2	2	7
4	Japan	3	2	0	5
5	(North Ossetia–Alania) North Ossetia-Alania	1	2	6	9
6	Kabardino-Balkaria	1	2	0	3
7	Mongolia	1	1	8	10
8	Russia	0	3	7	10
9	Chechnya	0	2	0	2
10	North Korea	0	1	1	2
10	Turkey	0	1	1	2
12	Cuba	0	0	3	3
13	Tuva	0	0	2	2
14	Buryatia	0	0	1	1
14	Estonia	0	0	1	1
14	Kazakhstan	0	0	1	1
14	Krasnoyarsk Krai	0	0	1	1
14	Turkmenistan	0	0	1	1
14	Ukraine	0	0	1	1
14	Uzbekistan	0	0	1	1
Totals (20 entries)		20	20	40	80

=== Men's freestyle ===
Event	Gold	Silver	Bronze
57 kg	(Dagestan) Zaur Uguev	(North Ossetia–Alania) Azamat Tuskaev	(Tuva) Donduk-ool Khuresh-ool
57 kg	(Dagestan) Zaur Uguev	(North Ossetia–Alania) Azamat Tuskaev	(Mongolia) Tsogbadrakh Tseveensuren
61 kg	(Dagestan) Gadzhimurad Rashidov	(Kabardino-Balkaria) Iszmail Muszukajev	(Mongolia) Tümenbilegiin Tüvshintulga
61 kg	(Dagestan) Gadzhimurad Rashidov	(Kabardino-Balkaria) Iszmail Muszukajev	(Buryatia) Aleksandr Bogomoev
65 kg	(Dagestan) Ilyas Bekbulatov	(Chechnya) Akhmed Chakaev	(Turkey) Selahattin Kılıçsallayan
65 kg	(Dagestan) Ilyas Bekbulatov	(Chechnya) Akhmed Chakaev	(Tuva) Nachyn Kuular
70 kg	(Dagestan) Magomed Kurbanaliev	(Dagestan) Magomedrasul Gazimagomedov	(Ukraine) Andrii Kviatkovskyi
70 kg	(Dagestan) Magomed Kurbanaliev	(Dagestan) Magomedrasul Gazimagomedov	(United States) Frank Molinaro
74 kg	(North Ossetia–Alania) Khetag Tsabolov	(North Ossetia–Alania) Zaurbek Sidakov	(North Ossetia–Alania) Kakhaber Khubezthy
74 kg	(North Ossetia–Alania) Khetag Tsabolov	(North Ossetia–Alania) Zaurbek Sidakov	(Turkmenistan) Dovletmyrat Orazgylyjov
79 kg	(Dagestan) Akhmed Gadzhimagomedov	(United States) Kyle Dake	(North Ossetia–Alania) Radik Valiev
79 kg	(Dagestan) Akhmed Gadzhimagomedov	(United States) Kyle Dake	(North Ossetia–Alania) Alan Zaseev
86 kg	(United States) David Taylor	(Turkey) Fatih Erdin	(North Ossetia–Alania) Artur Naifonov
86 kg	(United States) David Taylor	(Turkey) Fatih Erdin	(North Ossetia–Alania) Vladislav Valiev
92 kg	(Dagestan) Abdulrashid Sadulaev	(Kabardino-Balkaria) Anzor Urishev	(Mongolia) Turtogtokh Luvsandorj
92 kg	(Dagestan) Abdulrashid Sadulaev	(Kabardino-Balkaria) Anzor Urishev	(Krasnoyarsk Krai) Yuri Belonovskiy
97 kg	(United States) Kyle Snyder	(Dagestan) Rasul Magomedov	(Uzbekistan) Magomed Ibragimov
97 kg	(United States) Kyle Snyder	(Dagestan) Rasul Magomedov	(North Ossetia–Alania) Vladislav Baitcaev
125 kg	(Kabardino-Balkaria) Muradin Kushkhov	(Chechnya) Anzor Khizriev	(United States) Nick Gwiazdowski
125 kg	(Kabardino-Balkaria) Muradin Kushkhov	(Chechnya) Anzor Khizriev	(Mongolia) Natsagsürengiin Zolboo

=== Women's freestyle ===
Event	Gold	Silver	Bronze
50 kg	(Japan) Yuki Irie	(North Korea) Sonhyang Kim	(Russia) Anzhelika Vetoshkina
50 kg	(Japan) Yuki Irie	(North Korea) Sonhyang Kim	(China) Jie Ni
53 kg	(Japan) Yu Miyahara	(Russia) Stalvira Orshush	(Russia) Ekaterina Poleshchuk
53 kg	(Japan) Yu Miyahara	(Russia) Stalvira Orshush	(Russia) Natalia Malysheva
55 kg	(Japan) Andoriahanako Sawa	(China) Mengyu Xie	(Mongolia) Davaachimeg Erkymbayar
55 kg	(Japan) Andoriahanako Sawa	(China) Mengyu Xie	(North Korea) Jonghwa Choe
57 kg	(China) Zhang Qi	(Mongolia) Gantuya Enkhbat	(Cuba) Lianna Montero
57 kg	(China) Zhang Qi	(Mongolia) Gantuya Enkhbat	(Russia) Alexandra Andreeva
59 kg	(China) Rong Ningning	(United States) Allison Ragan	(Russia) Veronika Chumikova
59 kg	(China) Rong Ningning	(United States) Allison Ragan	(Russia) Uliana Tukurenova
62 kg	(Mongolia) Pürevdorjiin Orkhon	(Japan) Kiwa Sakae	(Cuba) Yaquelin Elizastigue
62 kg	(Mongolia) Pürevdorjiin Orkhon	(Japan) Kiwa Sakae	(Russia) Inna Trazhukova
65 kg	(China) Chuying Tang	(Russia) Yulia Prontsevitch	(Mongolia) Bolortungalag Zorigt
65 kg	(China) Chuying Tang	(Russia) Yulia Prontsevitch	(Mongolia) Tsevegmed Enkhbayar
68 kg	(United States) Tamyra Mensah	(China) Yue Han	(Cuba) Yudaris Sánchez
68 kg	(United States) Tamyra Mensah	(China) Yue Han	(China) Rui Xu
72 kg	(China) Wang Juan	(Japan) Masako Furuichi	(Mongolia) Ochirbatyn Nasanburmaa
72 kg	(China) Wang Juan	(Japan) Masako Furuichi	(Kazakhstan) Zhamila Bakbergenova
76 kg	(China) Zhou Qian	(Russia) Ekaterina Bukina	(China) Paliha
76 kg	(China) Zhou Qian	(Russia) Ekaterina Bukina	(Estonia) Epp Mäe

== Participating nations ==
299 competitors from 20 nations participated.

- Bulgaria (5)
- China (22)
- Cuba (12)
- Estonia (1)
- Finland (2)
- Georgia (10)
- Greece (1)
- Japan (7)
- Kazakhstan (26)
- Kyrgyzstan (5)
- North Korea (3)
- Mongolia (57)
- Norway (1)
- Russia (81)
- Tajikistan (2)
- Turkmenistan (10)
- Turkey (17)
- Ukraine (2)
- United States (22)
- Uzbekistan (13)

== Ranking Series ==
Ranking Series Calendar 2018:

- 1st Ranking Series: 25–26 January, Iran, Mahshahr ⇒ 2018 Takhti Cup (GR)
- 2nd Ranking Series: 26–28 January, Russia, Krasnoyarsk ⇒ Golden Grand Prix Ivan Yarygin 2018 (FS)
- 3rd Ranking Series: 15–23 February, Cuba, La Havana ⇒ 2018 Granma y Cerro Pelado (FS, WW, GR)
- 4th Ranking Series: 16–18 February, Sweden, Klippan ⇒ Klippan Lady Open (2018) (WW)
- 5th Ranking Series: 9–10 June, Mongolia, Ulaanbaatar ⇒ 2018 Mongolia Open (FS, WW)
- 6th Ranking Series: 22–23 June, China, Taiyuan ⇒ 2018 China Open (WW)
- 7th Ranking Series: 23–24 June, Hungary, Győr ⇒ 2018 Hungarian Grand Prix (GR)
- 8th Ranking Series: 3–5 July, Georgia, Tbilisi ⇒ 2018 Tbilisi Grand Prix of V. Balavadze and G. Kartozia (FS, GR)
- 9th Ranking Series: 20–22 July, Turkey, Istanbul ⇒ 2018 Vehbi Emre & Hamit Kaplan Tournament (GR)
- 10th Ranking Series: 27–20 July, Turkey, Istanbul ⇒ 2018 Yasar Dogu Tournament (FS, WW)
- 11th Ranking Series: 7–9 September, Poland, Warsaw ⇒ Ziolkowski, Pytlasinski, Poland Open (FS, WW, GR)
- 12th Ranking Series: 14–16 September, Belarus, Minsk ⇒ Medved (Test Event Minsk 2019)
