= Viktor Rassadin =

Tajikistani sport wrestler (born 1993)

Viktor Rassadin Виктор Рассадин
Personal information
- Full name: Viktor Sergeevich Rassadin
- Nationality: Russia
- Born: Виктор Сергеевич Рассадин; November 7, 1993 (age 32) Srednekolymsk, Sakha Republic, Russia
- Height: 173 cm (5 ft 8 in)

Sport
- Country: Russia (2012–2023); Tajikistan (2023–present)
- Sport: Wrestling
- Weight class: 74 kg
- Rank: International Master of Sport in freestyle wrestling
- Event: Freestyle
- Coached by: Ivan Dmitriev; Artur Konstantinov

Achievements and titles
- Olympic finals: 5th (2024)
- Regional finals: (silver) (2024)
Medal record
Men's freestyle wrestling
Representing Tajikistan
Asian Games
Bronze medal – third place	2026 Aichi–Nagoya	74 kg
Asian Championships
Silver medal – second place	2024 Bishkek	74 kg
Silver medal – second place	2025 Amman	70 kg
Golden Grand Prix Ivan Yarygin
Silver medal – second place	2026 Krasnoyarsk	70 kg
Representing Russian Wrestling Federation
Yasar Dogu Tournament
Bronze medal – third place	2022 Istanbul	70 kg
Representing Russia
World Cup
Gold medal – first place	2019 Yakutsk	Team
Silver medal – second place	2016 Los Angeles	Team
University World Championships
Gold medal – first place	2016 Çorum	61 kg
Yasar Dogu Tournament
Bronze medal – third place	2020 Istanbul	70 kg
Dan Kolov - Nikola Petrov Tournament
Bronze medal – third place	2019 Ruse	70 kg
Grand Prix
Gold medal – first place	2014 Ulan-Baatar	57 kg
Gold medal – first place	2014 Vanadzor	57 kg
Gold medal – first place	2014 Yakutsk	57 kg
Gold medal – first place	2015 Yakutsk	57 kg
Gold medal – first place	2017 Moscow	Team
Gold medal – first place	2017 Nefteyugansk	65 kg
Gold medal – first place	2017 Yakutsk	61 kg
Gold medal – first place	2018 Nefteyugansk	65 kg
Gold medal – first place	2018 Yakutsk	65 kg
Gold medal – first place	2018 Ulan-Baatar	65 kg
Gold medal – first place	2019 Yakutsk	65 kg
Silver medal – second place	2019 Kaspisk	65 kg
Silver medal – second place	2016 Yakutsk	65 kg
Silver medal – second place	2015 Olympia	61 kg
Silver medal – second place	2014 Kemerovo	61 kg
Silver medal – second place	2014 Ulan-Ude	57 kg
Bronze medal – third place	2021 Kaspisk	70 kg
Representing (Sakha Republic) Yakutia
Golden Grand Prix Ivan Yarygin
Gold medal – first place	2022 Krasnoyarsk	70 kg
Silver medal – second place	2021 Krasnoyarsk	70 kg
Bronze medal – third place	2017 Krasnoyarsk	61 kg
Russian National Championships
Silver medal – second place	2016 Yakutsk	61 kg
Silver medal – second place	2017 Nazran	61 kg
Bronze medal – third place	2014 Yakutsk	57 kg

Viktor Rassadin (Russian: Виктор Сергеевич Рассадин; born 6 November 1993) is a Russian-born Tajikistani freestyle wrestler who competes at 74 kilograms.

== Career ==
For his native Russia, Rassadin was a University World Champion, a three-time Russian National medalist and a multiple-time gold medalist at international tournaments.

Since transferring to Tajikistan in 2023, Rassadin claimed a silver medal from the 2024 Asian Championships and represented Tajikistan at the 2024 Summer Olympics after reaching the finals at the World Olympic Qualification Tournament.
