= Abbos Rakhmonov =

Uzbekistani freestyle wrestler

Personal information
- Nationality: Uzbekistan
- Born: 7 July 1998 (age 28) Uzbekistan
- Height: 169 cm (5 ft 7 in)

Sport
- Country: Uzbekistan
- Sport: Wrestling
- Weight class: 65 kg
- Event: Freestyle

Achievements and titles
- World finals: 5th(2019)
- Regional finals: (bronze) (2018) (bronze) (2022)
Medal record
Men's freestyle wrestling
Representing Uzbekistan
Asian Championships
Bronze medal – third place	2022 Ulaanbaatar	65 kg
Bronze medal – third place	2018 Bishkek	61 kg
Bolat Turlykhanov Cup
Silver medal – second place	2022 Almaty	65 kg
Olympic Qualification Tournament
Silver medal – second place	2016 Istanbul	57 kg
Asian Juniors Championships
Gold medal – first place	2018 New Delhi	61 kg
Silver medal – second place	2016 Taichung	60 kg
Asian Cadets Championships
Gold medal – first place	2013 Ulaanbaatar	50 kg
Silver medal – second place	2014 New Delhi	54 kg
Bronze medal – third place	2014 Bangkok	54 kg

Abbos Rakhmonov (born 7 July 1998) is an Uzbekistani freestyle wrestler. He competed in the men's freestyle 57 kg event at the 2016 Summer Olympics, in which he was eliminated in the round of 32 by Yowlys Bonne.
