= 2016 Russian National Freestyle Wrestling Championships =

2016 Russian Nationals
- Host city: (Sakha Republic) Yakutsk, Sakha, Russia
- Dates: May 27–29
- Stadium: Triumph Arena

Champions
- Freestyle: North Ossetia–Alania

The Russian National Freestyle Wrestling Championships 2016 were held in Yakutsk, Sakha-Yakutia, Russia in the Triumph Arena from 27 to 29 May 2016.

== Incident between Lebedev and Musukaev ==
At the end of the 57 kg quarterfinal wrestling match between Lebedev and Musukaev the referees awarded the victory to Viktor Lebedev. However, after the match the Russian Championships wrestling commission considered mistakes of the referee and awarded the victory to Ismail Musukaev (4-2). Even so, Lebedev remained in the semifinals.

After the incident, the Dagestani team walked out, along with others, including many members of Chechen team.

In the 57 kg final, following another controversial victory for Lebedev over Aleksandr Bogomoev, the commission decided award gold medals to both.

== Medal overview ==
=== Medal table ===
Rank	Nation	Gold	Silver	Bronze	Total
1	(North Ossetia–Alania) North Ossetia-Alania	2	2	4	8
2	Sakha Republic	2	1	3	6
3	Kabardino-Balkaria	2	0	0	2
4	Krasnoyarsk Krai	1	2	1	4
5	Chechnya	1	1	1	3
6	Buryatia	1	0	1	2
7	Moscow Oblast	0	1	0	1
8	Karachay-Cherkessia	0	0	2	2
9	Moscow	0	0	1	1
9	Saint Petersburg	0	0	1	1
9	Sakhalin Oblast	0	0	1	1
9	Tatarstan	0	0	1	1
Totals (12 entries)		9	7	16	32

=== Men's freestyle ===
Event	Gold	Silver	Bronze
57 kg	(Sakha Republic) Viktor Lebedev & (Buryatia) Aleksandr Bogomoev	Shared gold	(Chechnya) Dzhamal Otarsultanov
57 kg	(Sakha Republic) Viktor Lebedev & (Buryatia) Aleksandr Bogomoev	Shared gold	(Sakha Republic) Aryaan Tyutrin
61 kg	(Sakha Republic) Egor Ponamarev	(Sakha Republic) Viktor Rassadin	(Sakha Republic) Nurgun Skryabin
61 kg	(Sakha Republic) Egor Ponamarev	(Sakha Republic) Viktor Rassadin	(Sakha Republic) Vyacheslav Efremov
65 kg	(North Ossetia–Alania) Soslan Ramonov	(Krasnoyarsk Krai) Israil Kasumov	(North Ossetia–Alania) Alan Gogaev
65 kg	(North Ossetia–Alania) Soslan Ramonov	(Krasnoyarsk Krai) Israil Kasumov	(Krasnoyarsk Krai) Murad Nukhkadiev
70 kg	(North Ossetia–Alania) Zaurbek Sidakov	(North Ossetia–Alania) Radik Valiev	(Tatarstan) Ildus Giniatullin
70 kg	(North Ossetia–Alania) Zaurbek Sidakov	(North Ossetia–Alania) Radik Valiev	(Karachay-Cherkessia) Alibek Akbaev
74 kg	(Kabardino-Balkaria) Aniuar Geduev	(Moscow Oblast) Denis Tsargush	(North Ossetia–Alania) Atsamaz Sanakoev
74 kg	(Kabardino-Balkaria) Aniuar Geduev	(Moscow Oblast) Denis Tsargush	(Karachay-Cherkessia) Khuseyn Suyunchev
86 kg	(Kabardino-Balkaria) Anzor Urishev	(Krasnoyarsk Krai) Aleksandr Zelenkov	(North Ossetia–Alania) Vladislav Valiev
86 kg	(Kabardino-Balkaria) Anzor Urishev	(Krasnoyarsk Krai) Aleksandr Zelenkov	(Sakhalin Oblast) Shamil Abdurakhmanov
97 kg	(Chechnya) Anzor Boltukaev	(North Ossetia–Alania) Khadzhimurat Gatsalov	(Moscow) Yevgeny Kolomiets
97 kg	(Chechnya) Anzor Boltukaev	(North Ossetia–Alania) Khadzhimurat Gatsalov	(North Ossetia–Alania) Vladislav Baitcaev
125 kg	(Krasnoyarsk Krai) Mukhamagazi Magomedov	(Chechnya) Bekhan Dukaev	(Saint Petersburg) Anzor Khizriev
125 kg	(Krasnoyarsk Krai) Mukhamagazi Magomedov	(Chechnya) Bekhan Dukaev	(Buryatia) Baldan Tsyzhipov

== See also ==
- 2015 Russian National Freestyle Wrestling Championships
- 2017 Russian National Freestyle Wrestling Championships
- 2015 Russian National Greco-Roman Wrestling Championships
- Soviet and Russian results in men's freestyle wrestling
