= Shamil Omarov =

Russian pharmacologist (1936–2020)

- Born: Shamil Magomedovich Omarov; September 28, 1936; Dagestan, Soviet Union
- Education: Dagestan State Medical Institute
- Awards: Honored Scientist of the Dagestan (1990); Honorary Professor, DSMU; Veteran of Labour; Soros Professor
- Scientific career
- Fields: pharmacology
- Workplaces: Dagestan State Medical University
- Academic advisors: Nikolay Artemov

External image
- Professor Sh. M. Omarov

Shamil Magomedovich Omarov (Russian: Шамиль Магомедович Омаров; September 28, 1936, in Dagestan, Soviet Union - 2020) was a Russian pharmacologist, Doctor of Medical Sciences, Distinguished Professor of the Dagestan State Medical University (since 2013), Member of the National Academy of Sciences of the Dagestan, Chairman of the Society of Pharmacologists of the Dagestan, Member of the Russian Union of Writers. Honored Scientist of the Dagestan (1990). In 2016, in the Dagestankaya Pravda named him "The Leader of Dagestan pharmacology and apitherapy".

== Life ==
Omarov was born in Dagestan (was under Soviet Union), and was educated there. He graduated from the Dagestan State Medical Institute in 1961, and earned his Candidat degree in 1969 from N. I. Lobachevsky State University of Nizhny Novgorod. He was a student of Nikolay Artemov.

In 1980, he defended his doctoral thesis in the RUDN University, Moscow, and received the designation of professor. Since 1988, he heads the Department of Pharmacology at the Dagestan State Medical University. He was appointed Soros Professor.

Omarov is the author of 15 monographs and more than 400 scientific articles. He is the author of books (in Russian) including "Apitherapy in medicine" (2012), "Apiphytocosmetics for health" (2016), and "Encyclopedia of Apitherapy" (2016).

== Non-university activities ==
- Chairman of the Society of Pharmacologists of Dagestan
- 1989 - member of the International Committee of Apimondia
- 2002 - consultant of the American Biographical Institute for Apitherapy

== Family ==
Omarov has three children, one daughter and two sons.

== Honours and awards ==
- Veteran of Labour
- Honored Scientist of the Dagestan (1990)
- Nikolai Kravkov Russian Academy of Medical Sciences Medal (2012)
- Medal of Merit of the Dagestan State Medical University (2010)
- Medal "For the Development of Virgin Lands" (1957)
