= Ivan Guidea =

Romanian freestyle wrestler

Personal information
- Born: 12 May 1988 (age 38)

Sport
- Country: Romania
- Sport: Amateur wrestling
- Event: Freestyle

Ivan Guidea (born 12 May 1988) is a Romanian freestyle wrestler. He competed in the men's freestyle 57 kg event at the 2016 Summer Olympics, in which he was eliminated in the quarterfinals by Vladimir Dubov.
