= Akhmed Chakaev =

Russian freestyle wrestler (born 1988)

Personal information
- Native name: Ахмед Османович Чакаев
- Full name: Akhmed Osmanovich Chakaev
- National team: Russia
- Born: 23 March 1988 (age 38) Khasavyurt, Dagestan, Russia
- Height: 1.69 m (5 ft 7 in)
- Weight: 65 kg (143 lb)

Sport
- Country: Russia
- Sport: Wrestling
- Weight class: 65 kg
- Event: Freestyle
- Club: Shamil Umakhanov Wrestling Club (им. Шамиля Умаханова); Akhmat WC
- Team: Dagestan; Chechnya
- Coached by: Magomed Guseinov
Medal record
Men's freestyle wrestling
Representing Russia
World Championships
Bronze medal – third place	2016 Budapest	61 kg
Bronze medal – third place	2018 Budapest	65 kg
European Games
Bronze medal – third place	2019 Minsk	65 kg
European Championships
Silver medal – second place	2017 Novi Sad	61 kg
Russian National Championships
Gold medal – first place	2018 Odinzevo	65 kg
Silver medal – second place	2020 Naro-Fominsk	65 kg
Bronze medal – third place	2015 Kaspiisk	65 kg
Bronze medal – third place	2014 Yakutsk	65 kg
Golden Grand Prix Ivan Yarygin
Gold medal – first place	2019 Krasnoyarsk	65 kg
Gold medal – first place	2017 Krasnoyarsk	61 kg
Silver medal – second place	2018 Krasnoyarsk	65 kg
Silver medal – second place	2009 Krasnoyarsk	60 kg
Bronze medal – third place	2016 Krasnoyarsk	61 kg
Bronze medal – third place	2014 Krasnoyarsk	65 kg
Bronze medal – third place	2012 Krasnoyarsk	60 kg
Bronze medal – third place	2011 Krasnoyarsk	60 kg

Akhmed Osmanovich Chakaev (Russian: Ахмед Османович Чакаев; born 23 March 1988) is a Russian former freestyle wrestler. He is a two-time world freestyle wrestling bronze medalist. 2018 Russian national champion. 2020 Russian nationals runner-up and two-time bronze medalist.

At the 2015 Golden Grand Prix Ivan Yarygin he defeated American Olympic hopeful Aaron Pico.

Akhmed has a younger brother Anzar. They train in Tiger Muay Thai gym (Phuket) with George Hickman, Tai Tuivasa, Mairbek Taisumov, Mark Hunt, Tyson Pedro, Nordine Taleb and others.

== Championships and accomplishments ==
- Ali Aliyev Memorial Gold Medalist – 60 kg, 65 kg (2009, 2012, 2014, 2015)
- A multiple Golden Grand Prix Ivan Yarygin Medalist.
- Ramzan Kadyrov Cup Winner (2010, 2011, 2013. 2015)
- 2012 Ivan Yarygin Bronze Medalist - 60 kg.
- 2014 Ivan Yarygin Bronze Medalist - 65 kg.
- 2014 Russian Nationals – 3rd place (2014, Yakutsk)
- 2015 World Freestyle Wrestling Cup 2015 – 4th place (Los Angeles, USA)
- 2015 Russian Nationals – 3rd place (2015, Kaspiysk)
- 2015 European Nations Cup 2015 (Moscow Lights-Alrosa Cup) – 61 kg
- 2016 Non-Olympic weight World Championships bronze medalist – 61 kg
- 2016 Ivan Yarygin Bronze Medalist - 61 kg.
- 2017 Ivan Yarygin Winner - 61 kg.
- 2017 European runner-up – 61 kg
- 2017 Alany international winner – 65 kg;
- 2018 Ivan Yarygin Silver Medalist - 65 kg.
- 2018 Russian nationals 1st – 65 kg
- 2018 World Championships bronze medalist – 65 kg.
- 2019 Ivan Yarygin winner – 65 kg.
- European Games 2019 bronze medalist – 65 kg.
