= Bekkhan Goygereev =

Russian freestyle wrestler (born 1987)

Personal information
- Native name: Бекхан Салавдинович Гойгереев
- Full name: Bekkhan Salavdinovich Goygereev
- Nationality: Russia
- Born: May 22, 1987 (age 39) Bammaturt, Khasavyurtovsky District, Dagestan, Russia
- Height: 170 cm (5 ft 7 in)

Sport
- Country: Russia
- Sport: Wrestling
- Weight class: 60-65 kg
- Event: Freestyle
Medal record
Men's freestyle wrestling
Representing Russia
World Championships
Gold medal – first place	2013 Budapest	60 kg
European Championships
Silver medal – second place	2014 Vantaa	61 kg
Summer Universiade
Gold medal – first place	2013 Kazan	60 kg
Representing Chechnya
Russian National Championships
Gold medal – first place	2013 Krasnoyarsk	61 kg
Silver medal – second place	2018 Odintsovo	65 kg
Bronze medal – third place	2017 Ingushetia	65 kg
Bronze medal – third place	2014 Yakutsk	61 kg
Golden Grand Prix Ivan Yarygin
Silver medal – second place	2014 Krasnoyarsk	61 kg

Bekkhan Salavdinovich Goygereev (born May 22, 1987) is a Chechen-born Russian freestyle wrestler who won the gold medal at the 2013 World Wrestling Championships. He defeated Vladimir Dubov of Bulgaria to become the world champion.
