= Dzhamal Otarsultanov =

Chechen wrestler (born 1987)

Personal information
- Full name: Djamal Otarsultanov
- Nationality: (Russia) Russian
- Born: 14 April 1987 (age 39) Khasavyurtovsky District, Dagestan, Russian SFSR, Soviet Union
- Height: 1.63 m (5 ft 4 in)
- Weight: 55 kg (121 lb)

Sport
- Country: (Russia) Russian
- Sport: Wrestling
- Event: Freestyle
Medal record
Men's freestyle wrestling
Representing Russia
Olympic Games
Gold medal – first place	2012 London	55 kg
World Cup
Gold medal – first place	2007 Krasnoyarsk	55 kg
Bronze medal – third place	2009 Tehran	55 kg
European Championships
Gold medal – first place	2012 Belgrade	55 kg
Gold medal – first place	2011 Dortmund	55 kg
Gold medal – first place	2008 Tampere	55 kg
Bronze medal – third place	2006 Moscow	55 kg
Military World Games
Gold medal – first place	2015 Mungyeong	61 kg
Russian Championships
Gold medal – first place	2012 St.Petersburg	55 kg
Gold medal – first place	2008 St.Petersburg	55 kg
Silver medal – second place	2015 Kaspiisk	61 kg
Silver medal – second place	2011 Yakutsk	55 kg
Silver medal – second place	2007 Moscow	55 kg
Bronze medal – third place	2016 Yakutsk	57 kg
Bronze medal – third place	2010 Volgograd	55 kg
Bronze medal – third place	2006 Nishnevartovsk	55 kg
Bronze medal – third place	2005 Krasnodar	55 kg
Goldend Grand Prix Ivan Yarygin
Gold medal – first place	2014 Krasnoyarsk	61 kg
Gold medal – first place	2012 Krasnoyarsk	55 kg
Gold medal – first place	2011 Krasnoyarsk	55 kg
Bronze medal – third place	2015 Krasnoyarsk	61 kg
Bronze medal – third place	2009 Krasnoyarsk	55 kg
Junior World Championships
Gold medal – first place	2006 Guatemala	55 kg
Cadet European Championships
Gold medal – first place	2003 Skopje	46 kg
- Updated on November 18, 2012

Dzhamal Sultanovich Otarsultanov (Russian: Джамал Султанович Отарсултанов; born 14 April 1987) is a male Russian wrestler, who won the gold medal in men's freestyle 55 kg at the 2012 London Olympics.
