= 2011 World Wrestling Championships – Men's freestyle 55 kg =

Men's freestyle 55 kg at the 2011 World Championships
- Venue: Sinan Erdem Dome
- Dates: 16 September 2011
- Competitors: 45 from 45 nations

Medalists
gold medal	Viktor Lebedev	Russia
silver medal	Radoslav Velikov	Bulgaria
bronze medal	Daulet Niyazbekov	Kazakhstan
bronze medal	Hassan Rahimi	Iran

The men's freestyle 55 kilograms is a competition featured at the 2011 World Wrestling Championships, and was held at the Sinan Erdem Dome in Istanbul, Turkey on 16 September 2011.

== Results ==
Legend

- F — Won by fall
- WO — Won by walkover

=== Finals ===
Semifinals			Final
Viktor Lebedev (RUS)	1	4
Daulet Niyazbekov (KAZ)	0	0	Viktor Lebedev (RUS)	1	2
Radoslav Velikov (BUL)	1	1	Radoslav Velikov (BUL)	0	1
Nick Simmons (USA)	0	0

=== Top half ===
==== Section 1 ====
Round of 64

Round of 32
Mihran Jaburyan (ARM)	0	0
Viktor Lebedev (RUS)	7	4
Alan Olvera (MEX)	1	2
Bienvenu Andriamalala (MAD)	1	1
Šarūnas Jurčys (LTU)	7	7
Hel Here (CHA)	1	0
Frank Chamizo (CUB)	1	7	4
Rahul Aware (IND)	2	2	1

Round of 16
Viktor Lebedev (RUS)	3	7
Alan Olvera (MEX)	0	0
Šarūnas Jurčys (LTU)	1	0
Frank Chamizo (CUB)	1	6

Quarterfinals
Viktor Lebedev (RUS)	1	1
Frank Chamizo (CUB)	0	1

==== Section 2 ====
Round of 64

Round of 32
Fredy Serrano (COL)	3	4
Urs Wild (SUI)	1	0
David Tremblay (CAN)	0	2
Nurlan Makenaliev (KGZ)	4	5
Kim Yong-eub (KOR)	0	0
Makhmud Magomedov (AZE)	4	6
Ioannis Ivanidis (GRE)	0	0
Daulet Niyazbekov (KAZ)	7	7

Round of 16
Fredy Serrano (COL)	5
Nurlan Makenaliev (KGZ)	10^{F}
Makhmud Magomedov (AZE)	2	2	0
Daulet Niyazbekov (KAZ)	2	1	3

Quarterfinals
Nurlan Makenaliev (KGZ)	1	3	0
Daulet Niyazbekov (KAZ)	1	6	3

=== Bottom half ===
==== Section 3 ====
Round of 64
Vladimer Khinchegashvili (GEO)	7	7
Fernando Paredes (VEN)	0	0
Dilshod Mansurov (UZB)	3	2	0
Yang Kyong-il (PRK)	0	5	2
Andrei Dukov (ROU)	0	0
Hassan Rahimi (IRI)	1	3
André Quispe (CHI)	0	0
Radoslav Velikov (BUL)	7	6
Firas Al-Rifaei (SYR)	0	0
Uladzislau Andreyeu (BLR)	3	1

Round of 32
Craig McKenna (GBR)	3	2
Sem Shilimela (NAM)	7	3
Qi Mude (CHN)	0	0
Vladimer Khinchegashvili (GEO)	6	6
Yang Kyong-il (PRK)	1	1	0
Hassan Rahimi (IRI)	0	2	1
Radoslav Velikov (BUL)	1	0	1
Uladzislau Andreyeu (BLR)	0	1	0

Round of 16
Sem Shilimela (NAM)	0	0
Vladimer Khinchegashvili (GEO)	7	6
Hassan Rahimi (IRI)	0	1
Radoslav Velikov (BUL)	1	5

Quarterfinals
Vladimer Khinchegashvili (GEO)	1	2	0
Radoslav Velikov (BUL)	0	3	1

==== Section 4 ====
Round of 64
Lokman Kaplanbaba (FRA)	0	1	1
Ahmet Peker (TUR)	1	0	3
Yuriy Ledenev (UKR)	1	0
Shinichi Yumoto (JPN)	1	6
Francisco Sánchez (ESP)	0	0
Bayaraagiin Naranbaatar (MGL)	3	1
Hamzeh Koursha (JOR)	W	O
Ramil Rejepow (TKM)	W	O
Nikolay Noev (TJK)	2	7
Adama Diatta (SEN)	0	0
Mohamed Attia (TUN)	0	0
Nguyễn Huy Hà (VIE)	6	1
Nick Simmons (USA)	1	0	2
Marcel Ewald (GER)	0	1	0
Luis Orantes (GUA)	0	0
Alexandru Chirtoacă (MDA)	3	7

Round of 32
Ahmet Peker (TUR)	3	1	1
Shinichi Yumoto (JPN)	0	6	3
Bayaraagiin Naranbaatar (MGL)
Bye
Nikolay Noev (TJK)	2	4
Nguyễn Huy Hà (VIE)	1	3
Nick Simmons (USA)	4^{F}
Alexandru Chirtoacă (MDA)	2

Round of 16
Shinichi Yumoto (JPN)	6	5
Bayaraagiin Naranbaatar (MGL)	0	3
Nikolay Noev (TJK)	1	3	3
Nick Simmons (USA)	2	0	4

Quarterfinals
Shinichi Yumoto (JPN)	4	5
Nick Simmons (USA)	7	6

=== Repechage ===
Repechage round 1
André Quispe (CHI)	0	0
Uladzislau Andreyeu (BLR)	6	6

Repechage round 2
Mihran Jaburyan (ARM)	3^{F}
Alan Olvera (MEX)	0
Uladzislau Andreyeu (BLR)	0	0
Hassan Rahimi (IRI)	1	2

Repechage round 3
Mihran Jaburyan (ARM)	7	0	3
Frank Chamizo (CUB)	3	7	2
Hassan Rahimi (IRI)	1	2	6
Vladimer Khinchegashvili (GEO)	2	0	0

Bronze medals
Mihran Jaburyan (ARM)	1	3
Daulet Niyazbekov (KAZ)	5	5
Hassan Rahimi (IRI)	1	4
Nick Simmons (USA)	0	0
