= 2009 World Wrestling Championships – Men's freestyle 55 kg =

Men's freestyle 55 kg at the 2009 World Championships
- Venue: Messecenter Herning
- Dates: 21 September 2009
- Competitors: 32 from 32 nations

Medalists
gold medal	Yang Kyong-il	North Korea
silver medal	Sezar Akgül	Turkey
bronze medal	Rizvan Gadzhiev	Belarus
bronze medal	Viktor Lebedev	Russia

The men's freestyle 55 kilograms is a competition featured at the 2009 World Wrestling Championships, and was held at the Messecenter Herning exhibition center in Herning, Denmark on September 21.

This freestyle wrestling competition consists of a single-elimination tournament, with a repechage used to determine the winner of two bronze medals.

== Results ==
Legend

- F — Won by fall

=== Final ===
Final
Yang Kyong-il (PRK)	2	0	4
Sezar Akgül (TUR)	1	1	2

=== Top half ===
Round of 32
Andrei Dukov (ROU)	4	1	0
Altynbek Alymbaev (KGZ)	3	1	3
Hassan Rahimi (IRI)	1	1
Ramil Rejepow (TKM)	0	0
Ion Guidea (MDA)	0	1
Rizvan Gadzhiev (BLR)	4	3
Shinichi Yumoto (JPN)	1	1
John Pineda (CAN)	0	0
Yang Kyong-il (PRK)	1	3	4
Bayaraagiin Naranbaatar (MGL)	5	1	0
Vytas Čumakovas (LTU)	0	2
Krasimir Krastanov (GBR)	1	2
Besarion Gochashvili (GEO)	2	0	0
Mykola Aivazian (UKR)	1	1	6
Asset Serikbayev (KAZ)	1	0	1
Adama Diatta (SEN)	0	5	0

Round of 16
Altynbek Alymbaev (KGZ)	0	0
Hassan Rahimi (IRI)	3	6
Rizvan Gadzhiev (BLR)	3	3
Shinichi Yumoto (JPN)	2	1
Yang Kyong-il (PRK)	5	3
Krasimir Krastanov (GBR)	0	0
Mykola Aivazian (UKR)	3	0	7^{F}
Asset Serikbayev (KAZ)	3	6	2

Quarterfinals
Hassan Rahimi (IRI)	0	1	2
Rizvan Gadzhiev (BLR)	2	0	5
Yang Kyong-il (PRK)	6	7
Mykola Aivazian (UKR)	0	0

Semifinals
Rizvan Gadzhiev (BLR)	3	0
Yang Kyong-il (PRK)	4	2

=== Bottom half ===
Round of 32
Francisco Sánchez (ESP)	6	7
Arturo Chávez (MEX)	0	4
Tim Schleicher (GER)	2	1	0
Mihran Jaburyan (ARM)	1	5	2
Viktor Lebedev (RUS)	1	5
Héctor Camacho (VEN)	0	0
Luis Ibáñez (CUB)	0	0
Radoslav Velikov (BUL)	1	2
Danny Felix (USA)	0	1
Namig Sevdimov (AZE)	1	3
Urs Wild (SUI)	0	0
Sezar Akgül (TUR)	6	5
Kim Hyo-sub (KOR)	7	3
Balraj Singh (IND)	0	1
Nguyễn Huy Hà (VIE)	2	1	3^{F}
Li Bao (CHN)	5	0	0

Round of 16
Francisco Sánchez (ESP)	0
Mihran Jaburyan (ARM)	2^{F}
Viktor Lebedev (RUS)	1	1	2
Radoslav Velikov (BUL)	0	2	0
Namig Sevdimov (AZE)	0	0
Sezar Akgül (TUR)	1	6
Kim Hyo-sub (KOR)	5	2
Nguyễn Huy Hà (VIE)	2	1

Quarterfinals
Mihran Jaburyan (ARM)	0	0
Viktor Lebedev (RUS)	1	1
Sezar Akgül (TUR)	1	3
Kim Hyo-sub (KOR)	0	1

Semifinals
Viktor Lebedev (RUS)	1	0	2
Sezar Akgül (TUR)	0	1	5

=== Repechage ===
Repechage round 1
Bayaraagiin Naranbaatar (MGL)	2	1	0
Krasimir Krastanov (GBR)	1	4	1
Urs Wild (SUI)	0	0
Namig Sevdimov (AZE)	2	5

Repechage round 2
Krasimir Krastanov (GBR)	7	7
Mykola Aivazian (UKR)	0	0
Namig Sevdimov (AZE)	1	3
Kim Hyo-sub (KOR)	0	0

Bronze medals
Krasimir Krastanov (GBR)	0
Rizvan Gadzhiev (BLR)	6^{F}
Namig Sevdimov (AZE)	0	0
Viktor Lebedev (RUS)	1	1
