= Bulgaria at the 2012 Summer Olympics =

- IOC code: BUL
- NOC: Bulgarian Olympic Committee
- Website: www.bgolympic.org (in Bulgarian and English)

in London
- Competitors: 63 in 16 sports
- Flag bearers: Yordan Yovchev (opening); Stanka Zlateva (closing)
- Medals Ranked 63rd: Gold 0 Silver 2 Bronze 1 Total 3

Summer Olympics appearances (overview)
- 1896; 1900–1920; 1924; 1928; 1932; 1936; 1948; 1952; 1956; 1960; 1964; 1968; 1972; 1976; 1980; 1984; 1988; 1992; 1996; 2000; 2004; 2008; 2012; 2016; 2020; 2024; 2028

Bulgaria competed at the 2012 Summer Olympics in London, United Kingdom from 27 July to 12 August 2012. It was the nation's nineteenth appearance at the Summer Olympics, having missed the Olympics on three occasions, including the 1948 Summer Olympics in London due to the nation's role in World War II and 1984 Summer Olympics in Los Angeles because of the Soviet boycott. Despite this being London's third Olympic Games, this was the first time a Bulgarian team appeared at a London Olympics. The Bulgarian Olympic Committee sent the nation's smallest delegation to the Games, tying the record with Helsinki in 1952, and with Tokyo in 1964. A total of 63 athletes, 36 men and 27 women, competed in 16 sports. Men's volleyball was the only team event in which Bulgaria was represented in these Olympic games. There was only a single competitor in badminton, sprint canoeing, fencing, and judo.

The Bulgarian team featured three Olympic medalists from Beijing in freestyle wrestling: Stanka Zlateva, who won the silver, Radoslav Velikov and Kiril Terziev, who both won the bronze. Among these medalists, only Zlateva managed to repeat her silver medal in London, losing out to Russia's Natalia Vorobieva in the final match. Two Bulgarian athletes, on the other hand, made their sixth Olympic appearance: pistol shooter, two-time gold medalist, and former Olympic record holder Maria Grozdeva, and rings gymnast and multiple-time Olympic medalist Yordan Yovchev, who was also the nation's flag bearer at the opening ceremony.

Bulgaria, however, failed to win the gold medal for the first time since 1952, after achieving poor athletic performance at these Olympic games. Only three medals were awarded to the athletes, including the bronze medal won by heavyweight boxer Tervel Pulev.

== Medalists ==
Medal	Name	Sport	Event	Date
Silver	Stanka Zlateva	Wrestling	Women's freestyle 72 kg	9 August
Silver	Milka Maneva	Weightlifting	Women's 63 kg	31 July
Bronze	Tervel Pulev	Boxing	Men's heavyweight	10 August

== Archery ==
Athlete	Event	Ranking round		Round of 64	Round of 32	Round of 16	Quarterfinals	Semifinals	Final / BM	
Athlete	Event	Score	Seed	Opposition Score	Opposition Score	Opposition Score	Opposition Score	Opposition Score	Opposition Score	Rank
Yavor Hristov	Men's individual	663	35	Álvarez (MEX) (30); L 0–6	Did not advance					

== Athletics ==
Bulgarian athletes have so far achieved qualifying standards in the following athletics events (up to a maximum of 3 athletes in each event at the 'A' Standard, and 1 at the 'B' Standard):

In May 2012, the Bulgarian athletics federation announced a two-year ban for Inna Eftimova after testing positive for somatotropin at the World Championships held in August 2011 in Daegu, South Korea. As a consequence of the ban she will miss the 2012 London Olympics.

Key

- Note–Ranks given for track events are within the athlete's heat only
- Q = Qualified for the next round
- q = Qualified for the next round as a fastest loser or, in field events, by position without achieving the qualifying target
- NR = National record
- N/A = Round not applicable for the event
- Bye = Athlete not required to compete in round

Men
Field events

Athlete	Event	Qualification		Final	
Athlete	Event	Distance	Position	Distance	Position
Georgi Ivanov	Shot put	19.63	22	Did not advance	
Viktor Ninov	High jump	2.16	=28	Did not advance	

Women
Track & road events

Athlete	Event	Heat		Quarterfinal		Semifinal		Final	
Athlete	Event	Result	Rank	Result	Rank	Result	Rank	Result	Rank
Silvia Danekova	3000 m steeplechase	9:59.52	11	—N/a				Did not advance	
Ivet Lalova	100 m	Bye		11.06	2 Q	11.31	6	Did not advance	
Ivet Lalova	200 m	23.01	5 q	—N/a		22.98	6	Did not advance	
Vanya Stambolova	400 m hurdles	DNF		—N/a		Did not advance			

Field events

Athlete	Event	Qualification		Final	
Athlete	Event	Distance	Position	Distance	Position
Andriana Banova	Triple jump	13.33	32	Did not advance	
Radoslava Mavrodieva	Shot put	NM	—	Did not advance	
Venelina Veneva	High jump	1.85	=20	Did not advance	

== Badminton ==
Bulgaria have won 1 quota for the women's singles competition.

Athlete	Event	Group Stage			Elimination	Quarterfinal	Semifinal	Final / BM	
Athlete	Event	Opposition Score	Opposition Score	Rank	Opposition Score	Opposition Score	Opposition Score	Opposition Score	Rank
Petya Nedelcheva	Women's singles	Zaitsava (BLR); W 21–7, 21–19	Firdasari (INA); L 10–21, 15–21	2	Did not advance				

== Boxing ==
Bulgaria has so far qualified boxers for the following events

Men

Athlete	Event	Round of 32	Round of 16	Quarterfinals	Semifinals	Final	
Athlete	Event	Opposition Result	Opposition Result	Opposition Result	Opposition Result	Opposition Result	Rank
Aleksandar Aleksandrov	Light flyweight	Máquina (MOZ); W 22–7	Shin J-H (KOR); W 15–14	Pongprayoon (THA); L 10–16	Did not advance		
Detelin Dalakliev	Bantamweight	Sonjica (RSA); W 15–6	Balla (AUS); W 14–10	Campbell (GBR); L 15–16	Did not advance		
Tervel Pulev	Heavyweight	—N/a	Wang (CHN); W 10–7	Peralta (ARG); W 13–10	Usyk (UKR); L 5–21	Did not advance	3rd place, bronze medalist(s)

Women

Athlete	Event	Round of 16	Quarterfinals	Semifinals	Final	
Athlete	Event	Opposition Result	Opposition Result	Opposition Result	Opposition Result	Rank
Stoyka Petrova	Flyweight	Fernandes (NZL); W 23–11	Adams (GBR); L 7–16	Did not advance		

== Canoeing ==
=== Sprint ===
Bulgaria has gained a quota place for the following sprint event;

Athlete	Event	Heats		Semifinals		Final	
Athlete	Event	Time	Rank	Time	Rank	Time	Rank
Miroslav Kirchev	Men's K-1 1000 m	3:30.768	3 Q	3:30.818	5 FB	3:33.051	11

Qualification Legend: FA = Qualify to final (medal); FB = Qualify to final B (non-medal)

== Cycling ==
=== Road ===
Athlete	Event	Time	Rank
Spas Gyurov	Men's road race	Did not finish	
Danail Petrov	Men's road race	5:46:37	61

== Fencing ==
Bulgaria has qualified 1 fencer.

Women

Athlete	Event	Round of 32	Round of 16	Quarterfinal	Semifinal	Final / BM	
Athlete	Event	Opposition Score	Opposition Score	Opposition Score	Opposition Score	Opposition Score	Rank
Margarita Tschomakova	Individual sabre	Kharlan (UKR); L 8–15	Did not advance				

== Gymnastics ==
=== Artistic ===
Men

Athlete	Event	Qualification								Final							
Athlete	Event	Apparatus						Total	Rank	Apparatus						Total	Rank
Athlete	Event	F	PH	R	V	PB	HB	Total	Rank	F	PH	R	V	PB	HB	Total	Rank
Yordan Yovchev	Rings	—N/a		15.308	—N/a			15.308	8 Q	—N/a		15.108	—N/a			15.108	7

Women

Athlete	Event	Qualification						Final					
Athlete	Event	Apparatus				Total	Rank	Apparatus				Total	Rank
Athlete	Event	F	V	UB	BB	Total	Rank	F	V	UB	BB	Total	Rank
Ralitsa Mileva	All-around	12.200	13.200	10.966	12.066	48.432	56	Did not advance					

=== Rhythmic ===
Athlete	Event	Qualification						Final					
Athlete	Event	Hoop	Ball	Clubs	Ribbon	Total	Rank	Hoop	Ball	Clubs	Ribbon	Total	Rank
Silvia Miteva	Individual	27.700	27.800	27.325	28.100	110.925	4 Q	27.450	27.100	26.750	27.650	108.950	8

Athlete	Event	Qualification				Final			
Athlete	Event	5 balls	3 ribbons 2 hoops	Total	Rank	5 balls	3 ribbons 2 hoops	Total	Rank
Reneta Kamberova; Mihaela Maevska; Tsvetelina Naydenova; Elena Todorova; Hristiana Todorova; Katrin Velkova	Team	27.250	27.375	54.625	4 Q	27.950	26.425	54.375	6

== Judo ==
Bulgaria have won 1 quota for the men's competition

Athlete	Event	Round of 64	Round of 32	Round of 16	Quarterfinals	Semifinals	Repechage	Final / BM	
Athlete	Event	Opposition Result	Opposition Result	Opposition Result	Opposition Result	Opposition Result	Opposition Result	Opposition Result	Rank
Martin Ivanov	Men's −66 kg	Bye	Lim (KAZ); L 0001–0101	Did not advance					

== Sailing ==
Bulgaria has qualified 1 boat for each of the following events

Men

Athlete	Event	Race											Net points	Final rank
Athlete	Event	1	2	3	4	5	6	7	8	9	10	M*	Net points	Final rank
Yoan Kolev	RS:X	29	31	39	16	20	~~35~~	26	19	19	8	EL	207	26

Women

Athlete	Event	Race											Net points	Final rank
Athlete	Event	1	2	3	4	5	6	7	8	9	10	M*	Net points	Final rank
Irina Konstantinova-Bontemps	RS:X	23	22	15	20	23	20	20	16	~~24~~	21	EL	180	22

M = Medal race; EL = Eliminated – did not advance into the medal race;

== Shooting ==
Bulgaria has gained four quota places in the shooting events;

Men

Athlete	Event	Qualification		Final	
Athlete	Event	Points	Rank	Points	Rank
Anton Rizov	50 m rifle 3 positions	1162	24	Did not advance	
Anton Rizov	50 m rifle prone	588	42	Did not advance	
Anton Rizov	10 m air rifle	593	22	Did not advance	

Women

Athlete	Event	Qualification		Final	
Athlete	Event	Points	Rank	Points	Rank
Antoaneta Boneva	25 m pistol	582	10	Did not advance	
Antoaneta Boneva	10 m air pistol	384	9	Did not advance	
Mariya Grozdeva	25 m pistol	384	9	Did not advance	
Mariya Grozdeva	10 m air pistol	378	24	Did not advance	
Petya Lukanova	50 m rifle 3 positions	577	30	Did not advance	
Petya Lukanova	10 m air rifle	392	40	Did not advance	

== Swimming ==
Bulgarian swimmers have so far achieved qualifying standards in the following events (up to a maximum of 2 swimmers in each event at the Olympic Qualifying Time (OQT), and 1 at the Olympic Selection Time (OST)):

Men

Athlete	Event	Heat		Final	
Athlete	Event	Time	Rank	Time	Rank
Ventsislav Aydarski	1500 m freestyle	15.34.86	28	Did not advance	
Petar Stoychev	10 km open water	—N/a		1:50:46.2	9

Women

Athlete	Event	Heat		Semifinal		Final	
Athlete	Event	Time	Rank	Time	Rank	Time	Rank
Ekaterina Avramova	100 m backstroke	1:02.20	31	Did not advance			
Ekaterina Avramova	200 m backstroke	2:15.44	32	Did not advance			
Nina Rangelova	100 m freestyle	55.52	24	Did not advance			
Nina Rangelova	200 m freestyle	1:59.21	19	Did not advance			
Nina Rangelova	400 m freestyle	4:11.71	23	—N/a		Did not advance	

== Tennis ==
Athlete	Event	Round of 64	Round of 32	Round of 16	Quarterfinals	Semifinals	Final	
Athlete	Event	Opposition Score	Opposition Score	Opposition Score	Opposition Score	Opposition Score	Opposition Score	Rank
Grigor Dimitrov	Men's singles	Kubot (POL); W 6–3, 7–6^{(7–4)}	Simon (FRA); L 3–6, 3–6	Did not advance				
Tsvetana Pironkova	Women's singles	Cibulková (SVK); W 7–6^{(7–4)}, 6–2	Pennetta (ITA); L 5–7, 1–6	Did not advance				

== Volleyball ==
Bulgaria's men's volleyball team have secured place in the Olympic tournament.

=== Men's indoor tournament ===
Team roster

The following is the Bulgarian roster in the men's volleyball tournament of the 2012 Summer Olympics.

Head coach: Nayden Naydenov

№	Name	Date of birth	Height	Weight	Spike	Block	2012 club
1	Georgi Bratoev	October 21, 1987 (age 38)	2.02 m (6 ft 8 in)	88 kg (194 lb)	335 cm (132 in)	318 cm (125 in)	(Bulgaria) Levski Volley
7	Todor Skrimov	9 January 1990	1.91 m (6 ft 3 in)	82 kg (181 lb)	340 cm (130 in)	310 cm (120 in)	(France) Paris Volley
9	Dobromir Dimitrov	7 July 1991	1.96 m (6 ft 5 in)	81 kg (179 lb)	342 cm (135 in)	322 cm (127 in)	(Bulgaria) Pirin Balkanstroy
10	Valentin Bratoev	21 October 1987	2.01 m (6 ft 7 in)	87 kg (192 lb)	335 cm (132 in)	315 cm (124 in)	(Italy) Argos Volley
11	Vladimir Nikolov (c)	3 October 1977	2.00 m (6 ft 7 in)	95 kg (209 lb)	345 cm (136 in)	325 cm (128 in)	(Italy) Copra Volley
12	Viktor Yosifov	16 October 1985	2.04 m (6 ft 8 in)	95 kg (209 lb)	350 cm (140 in)	330 cm (130 in)	(Italy) Pallavolo Modena
13	Teodor Salparov (L)	16 August 1982	1.85 m (6 ft 1 in)	73 kg (161 lb)	320 cm (130 in)	305 cm (120 in)	(Bulgaria) VC CSKA Sofia
14	Teodor Todorov	1 September 1989	2.08 m (6 ft 10 in)	94 kg (207 lb)	365 cm (144 in)	345 cm (136 in)	(Russia) Gazprom-Yugra Surgut
15	Todor Aleksiev	21 April 1983	2.00 m (6 ft 7 in)	96 kg (212 lb)	347 cm (137 in)	327 cm (129 in)	(Russia) Gazprom-Yugra Surgut
17	Nikolay Penchev	22 August 1992	1.96 m (6 ft 5 in)	85 kg (187 lb)	335 cm (132 in)	320 cm (130 in)	(Italy) Copra Volley
18	Nikolay Nikolov	29 July 1986	2.06 m (6 ft 9 in)	97 kg (214 lb)	350 cm (140 in)	332 cm (131 in)	(Italy) Tonno Callipo Vibo Valentia
19	Tsvetan Sokolov	31 December 1989	2.06 m (6 ft 9 in)	108 kg (238 lb)	362 cm (143 in)	319 cm (126 in)	(Italy) Itas Diatec Trentino

Group play

Pos	Team	Pld	W	L	Pts	SW	SL	SR	SPW	SPL	SPR
1	Bulgaria	5	4	1	12	13	4	3.250	407	390	1.044
2	Poland	5	3	2	9	11	7	1.571	433	374	1.158
3	Argentina	5	3	2	9	10	7	1.429	382	367	1.041
4	Italy	5	3	2	8	10	9	1.111	426	413	1.031
5	Australia	5	2	3	7	8	10	0.800	395	397	0.995
6	Great Britain	5	0	5	0	0	15	0.000	274	376	0.729

29 July 2012; 09:30	Great Britain	0–3	Bulgaria	Earls Court Exhibition Centre, London; Attendance: 14,000; Referees: Wang Ning (CHN), Akihiko Tano (JPN)
29 July 2012; 09:30	(18–25, 20–25, 24–26); Results Statistics			Earls Court Exhibition Centre, London; Attendance: 14,000; Referees: Wang Ning (CHN), Akihiko Tano (JPN)

31 July 2012; 11:40	Poland	1–3	Bulgaria	Earls Court Exhibition Centre, London; Attendance: 11,300; Referees: Andrey Zenovich (RUS), Akihiko Tano (JPN)
31 July 2012; 11:40	(22–25, 27–29, 25–13, 23–25); Results Statistics			Earls Court Exhibition Centre, London; Attendance: 11,300; Referees: Andrey Zenovich (RUS), Akihiko Tano (JPN)

2 August 2012; 12:20	Australia	0–3	Bulgaria	Earls Court Exhibition Centre, London; Attendance: 12,000; Referees: Wang Ning (CHN), Andrey Zenovich (RUS)
2 August 2012; 12:20	(23–25, 21–25, 22–25); Results Statistics			Earls Court Exhibition Centre, London; Attendance: 12,000; Referees: Wang Ning (CHN), Andrey Zenovich (RUS)

4 August 2012; 20:30	Argentina	3–1	Bulgaria	Earls Court Exhibition Centre, London; Attendance: 14,500; Referees: Frans Loderus (NED), Akihiko Tano (JPN)
4 August 2012; 20:30	(25–18, 21–25, 25–19, 25–20); Results Statistics			Earls Court Exhibition Centre, London; Attendance: 14,500; Referees: Frans Loderus (NED), Akihiko Tano (JPN)

6 August 2012; 14:45	Italy	0–3	Bulgaria	Earls Court Exhibition Centre, London; Attendance: 14,000; Referees: Akihiko Tano (JPN), Bela Hobor (HUN)
6 August 2012; 14:45	(30–32, 20–25, 19–25); Results Statistics			Earls Court Exhibition Centre, London; Attendance: 14,000; Referees: Akihiko Tano (JPN), Bela Hobor (HUN)

Quarterfinal

8 August 2012; 21:30	Bulgaria	3–0	Germany	Earls Court Exhibition Centre, London; Attendance: 12,000; Referees: Bela Hobor (HUN), Denny Cespedes (DOM)
8 August 2012; 21:30	(25–20, 25–16, 25–14); Results Statistics			Earls Court Exhibition Centre, London; Attendance: 12,000; Referees: Bela Hobor (HUN), Denny Cespedes (DOM)

Semifinal

10 August 2012; 15:00	Bulgaria	1–3	Russia	Earls Court Exhibition Centre, London; Attendance: 13,500; Referees: Wang Ning (CHN), Denny Cespedes (DOM)
10 August 2012; 15:00	(21–25, 15–25, 25–23, 23–25); Results Statistics			Earls Court Exhibition Centre, London; Attendance: 13,500; Referees: Wang Ning (CHN), Denny Cespedes (DOM)

Bronze medal game

12 August 2012; 09:30	Bulgaria	1–3	Italy	Earls Court Exhibition Centre, London; Attendance: 12,000; Referees: Frans Loderus (NED), Rolando Cholakian (ARG)
12 August 2012; 09:30	(19–25, 25–23, 22–25, 21–25); Results Statistics			Earls Court Exhibition Centre, London; Attendance: 12,000; Referees: Frans Loderus (NED), Rolando Cholakian (ARG)

== Weightlifting ==
Bulgaria has qualified the following quota places.

Athlete	Event	Snatch		Clean & Jerk		Total	Rank
Athlete	Event	Result	Rank	Result	Rank	Total	Rank
Ivan Markov	Men's −85 kg	172	3	203	6	375	4
Milka Maneva	Women's −63 kg	102	5	131	3	233	2nd place, silver medalist(s)

== Wrestling ==
Bulgaria has secured 9 quota places.

Key:

- VT – Victory by Fall.
- PP – Decision by Points – the loser with technical points.
- PO – Decision by Points – the loser without technical points.

Men's freestyle

Athlete	Event	Qualification	Round of 16	Quarterfinal	Semifinal	Repechage 1	Repechage 2	Final / BM	
Athlete	Event	Opposition Result	Opposition Result	Opposition Result	Opposition Result	Opposition Result	Opposition Result	Opposition Result	Rank
Radoslav Velikov	−55 kg	Noev (TJK); W 3–0 ^{PO}	Khinchegashvili (GEO); L 1–3 ^{PP}	Did not advance		Farag (EGY); W 3–0 ^{PO}	Kumar (IND); W 3–0 ^{PO}	S Yumoto (JPN); L 1–3 ^{PP}	5
Anatolie Guidea	−60 kg	Dutt (IND); L 1–3 ^{PP}	Did not advance						13
Leonid Bazan	−66 kg	Bye	Hasanov (AZE); L 1–3 ^{PP}	Did not advance					14
Kiril Terziev	−74 kg	Bye	Goudarzi (IRI); L 1–3 ^{PP}	Did not advance		Bye	Tigiev (UZB); L 0–3 ^{PO}	Did not advance	15

Men's Greco-Roman

Athlete	Event	Qualification	Round of 16	Quarterfinal	Semifinal	Repechage 1	Repechage 2	Final / BM	
Athlete	Event	Opposition Result	Opposition Result	Opposition Result	Opposition Result	Opposition Result	Opposition Result	Opposition Result	Rank
Aleksandar Kostadinov	−55 kg	Bye	Li Sj (CHN); L 1–3 ^{PP}	Did not advance					12
Ivo Angelov	−60 kg	Coleman (USA); W 3–1 ^{PP}	Norouzi (IRI); L 0–3 ^{PO}	Did not advance		Sheng J (CHN); W 3–1 ^{PP}	Kebispayev (KAZ); L 0–3 ^{PO}	Did not advance	7
Hristo Marinov	−84 kg	Bye	Gadzhiyev (KAZ); L 0–3 ^{PO}	Did not advance					18
Elis Guri	−96 kg	Alexuc-Ciurariu (ROU); W 3–0 ^{PO}	Jabidze (GEO); W 3–1 ^{PP}	Dzeinichenka (BLR); L 0–3 ^{PO}	Did not advance				7

Women's freestyle

Athlete	Event	Qualification	Round of 16	Quarterfinal	Semifinal	Repechage 1	Repechage 2	Final / BM	
Athlete	Event	Opposition Result	Opposition Result	Opposition Result	Opposition Result	Opposition Result	Opposition Result	Opposition Result	Rank
Stanka Zlateva	−72 kg	Marzaliuk (BLR); W 3–0 ^{PO}	Fransson (SWE); W 3–0 ^{PO}	Ali (CMR); W 3–1 ^{PP}	Unda (ESP); W 3–0 ^{PO}	Bye		Vorobieva (RUS); L 0–5 ^{VT}	2nd place, silver medalist(s)
