= 2010 World Wrestling Championships – Men's freestyle 55 kg =

Men's freestyle 55 kg at the 2010 World Championships
- Venue: Olympic Stadium
- Dates: 10 September 2010
- Competitors: 33 from 33 nations

Medalists
gold medal	Viktor Lebedev	Russia
silver medal	Toghrul Asgarov	Azerbaijan
bronze medal	Frank Chamizo	Cuba
bronze medal	Yasuhiro Inaba	Japan

The men's freestyle 55 kilograms is a competition featured at the 2010 World Wrestling Championships, and was held at the Olympic Stadium in Moscow, Russia on 10 September.

== Results ==
Legend

- F — Won by fall

=== Finals ===
Semifinals				Final
Viktor Lebedev (RUS)	1	1
Frank Chamizo (CUB)	0	0		Viktor Lebedev (RUS)	1	0	1
Toghrul Asgarov (AZE)	6	1	2	Toghrul Asgarov (AZE)	0	3	0
Yasuhiro Inaba (JPN)	0	1	1

=== Top half ===
==== Section 1 ====
Round of 64

Round of 32
Šarūnas Jurčys (LTU)	4	7
Bienvenu Andriamalala (MAD)	1	1
Lokman Kaplanbaba (FRA)	0	2
Kim Hyo-sub (KOR)	1	6
Andrei Dukov (ROU)	4	1
Radoslav Velikov (BUL)	2	2^{F}
Nasibullo Kurbanov (UZB)	0	0
Viktor Lebedev (RUS)	3	1

Round of 16
Šarūnas Jurčys (LTU)	0	0
Kim Hyo-sub (KOR)	6	7
Radoslav Velikov (BUL)	0	0
Viktor Lebedev (RUS)	3	7

Quarterfinals
Kim Hyo-sub (KOR)	0	0
Viktor Lebedev (RUS)	1	1

==== Section 2 ====
Round of 64

Round of 32
Qi Mude (CHN)	0	0
Besarion Gochashvili (GEO)	1	2
Hassan Rahimi (IRI)	1	1
Adrian Hajduk (POL)	0	0
Krasimir Krastanov (GBR)	1	1
Frank Chamizo (CUB)	1	3
Serhiy Ratushnyi (UKR)	1	0	3
Gegham Babakhanyan (ARM)	0	1	1

Round of 16
Besarion Gochashvili (GEO)	1	0	0
Hassan Rahimi (IRI)	0	1	2
Frank Chamizo (CUB)	2	2
Serhiy Ratushnyi (UKR)	0	0

Quarterfinals
Hassan Rahimi (IRI)	0	0
Frank Chamizo (CUB)	1	2

=== Bottom half ===
==== Section 3 ====
Round of 64

Round of 32
Henry Moki Ndive (CMR)	0	0
Toghrul Asgarov (AZE)	6	7
Mikhail Zakharov (KGZ)	0	0
Bayaraagiin Naranbaatar (MGL)	1	4
Rizvan Gadzhiev (BLR)	3	1	2
Ghenadie Tulbea (MON)	1	2	1
Ramil Rejepow (TKM)	0	0
Alexandru Chirtoacă (MDA)	4	2

Round of 16
Toghrul Asgarov (AZE)	4	3^{F}
Bayaraagiin Naranbaatar (MGL)	2	0
Rizvan Gadzhiev (BLR)	2	2
Alexandru Chirtoacă (MDA)	2	2

Quarterfinals
Toghrul Asgarov (AZE)	3	5
Rizvan Gadzhiev (BLR)	0	0

==== Section 4 ====
Round of 64
Aslan Zhanakhanov (KAZ)	0	6	2
Tim Schleicher (GER)	1	3	0

Round of 32
Urs Wild (SUI)	0
Sezar Akgül (TUR)	3^{F}
Obe Blanc (USA)	2	1
Francisco Sánchez (ESP)	0	0
John Pineda (CAN)	1	4
Yasuhiro Inaba (JPN)	7	7
Ibrahim Farag (EGY)	0	0
Aslan Zhanakhanov (KAZ)	1	3

Round of 16
Sezar Akgül (TUR)	0	0
Obe Blanc (USA)	2	3
Yasuhiro Inaba (JPN)	1	2
Aslan Zhanakhanov (KAZ)	1	0

Quarterfinals
Obe Blanc (USA)	2	2
Yasuhiro Inaba (JPN)	0	4^{F}

=== Repechage ===
Repechage round 2
Nasibullo Kurbanov (UZB)	0	0
Radoslav Velikov (BUL)	1	4
Henry Moki Ndive (CMR)	0	0
Bayaraagiin Naranbaatar (MGL)	4	4^{F}

Repechage round 3
Radoslav Velikov (BUL)	1	1	1
Kim Hyo-sub (KOR)	0	3	7
Bayaraagiin Naranbaatar (MGL)	2	5
Rizvan Gadzhiev (BLR)	1	0

Bronze medals
Kim Hyo-sub (KOR)	0	3	1
Frank Chamizo (CUB)	1	2	5
Bayaraagiin Naranbaatar (MGL)	0	0
Yasuhiro Inaba (JPN)	1	6
