= 2007 World Wrestling Championships – Men's freestyle 55 kg =

Men's freestyle 55 kg at the 2007 World Championships
- Venue: Heydar Aliyev Sports and Concert Complex
- Dates: 19 September 2007
- Competitors: 38 from 38 nations

Medalists
gold medal	Besik Kudukhov	Russia
silver medal	Bayaraagiin Naranbaatar	Mongolia
bronze medal	Rizvan Gadzhiev	Belarus
bronze medal	Andy Moreno	Cuba

The men's freestyle 55 kilograms is a competition featured at the 2007 World Wrestling Championships, and was held at the Heydar Aliyev Sports and Concert Complex in Baku, Azerbaijan on 19 September 2007.

== Results ==
Legend

- F — Won by fall
- WO — Won by walkover

=== Finals ===
Semifinals				Final
Bayaraagiin Naranbaatar (MGL)	2	1	1
Rizvan Gadzhiev (BLR)	0	1	1	Bayaraagiin Naranbaatar (MGL)	0	1
Dilshod Mansurov (UZB)	2	0		Besik Kudukhov (RUS)	3	1
Besik Kudukhov (RUS)	3	5

=== Top half ===
==== Section 1 ====
Round of 64

Round of 32
Ghenadie Tulbea (MDA)	4	0	6
Andrejs Vasiļjevs (LAT)	0	3	0
Fabio Coscino (ITA)	0	0
Firas Al-Rifaei (SYR)	5	5
Sezar Akgül (TUR)	3	6
Gocha Kirkitadze (GEO)	0	4
Bayaraagiin Naranbaatar (MGL)	2	2
Amiran Kardanov (GRE)	0	0

Round of 16
Ghenadie Tulbea (MDA)	1	2
Firas Al-Rifaei (SYR)	2	4
Sezar Akgül (TUR)	1	0
Bayaraagiin Naranbaatar (MGL)	3	3

Quarterfinals
Firas Al-Rifaei (SYR)	0
Bayaraagiin Naranbaatar (MGL)	4^{F}

==== Section 2 ====
Round of 64

Round of 32
Taghi Dadashi (IRI)	1	4
Henry Cejudo (USA)	0	0
Elgin Loren Elwais (PLW)	0	0
Rizvan Gadzhiev (BLR)	2	7
Ramil Rejepow (TKM)	7	1
István Kovács (HUN)	0	0
Kim Hyo-sub (KOR)	0	3	1
Zhassulan Mukhtarbekuly (KAZ)	1	2	5

Round of 16
Taghi Dadashi (IRI)	1	0
Rizvan Gadzhiev (BLR)	2	1
Ramil Rejepow (TKM)	0	0
Zhassulan Mukhtarbekuly (KAZ)	1	3

Quarterfinals
Rizvan Gadzhiev (BLR)	5	3
Zhassulan Mukhtarbekuly (KAZ)	1	1

=== Bottom half ===
==== Section 3 ====
Round of 64

Round of 32
Marcel Ewald (GER)	2	0
Radoslav Velikov (BUL)	1	4^{F}
Tomohiro Matsunaga (JPN)	1	0
Dilshod Mansurov (UZB)	1	2
Raad Abbas (IRQ)	1	0
Valentin Popescu (ROU)	3	2
Mihran Jaburyan (ARM)	1	1	0
Francisco Sánchez (ESP)	0	4	1

Round of 16
Radoslav Velikov (BUL)	0	3	0
Dilshod Mansurov (UZB)	2	0	6
Valentin Popescu (ROU)	0	0
Francisco Sánchez (ESP)	1	4

Quarterfinals
Dilshod Mansurov (UZB)	1	0	1
Francisco Sánchez (ESP)	0	1	0

==== Section 4 ====
Round of 64
Anil Kumar (IND)	5	6
César Roberty (VEN)	3	0
Besik Kudukhov (RUS)	1	2	1
Mikheil Japaridze (CAN)	3	1	0
Luo Meng (CHN)	9^{F}
Nurlan Turarbek Uulu (KGZ)	0
Andy Moreno (CUB)	2	4
Mariusz Walkowiak (POL)	0	0
Yang Kyong-il (PRK)	1	6
Oleksandr Khavilov (UKR)	0	0
Shane Parker (AUS)	0	0
Namig Abdullayev (AZE)	8	7

Round of 32
Mauricio González (GUA)	1	1
Fredy Serrano (COL)	7	8^{F}
Anil Kumar (IND)	0	0
Besik Kudukhov (RUS)	1	5
Luo Meng (CHN)	2	1
Andy Moreno (CUB)	4	2
Yang Kyong-il (PRK)	1	3
Namig Abdullayev (AZE)	0	0

Round of 16
Fredy Serrano (COL)	0	0
Besik Kudukhov (RUS)	2	4
Andy Moreno (CUB)	1	2
Yang Kyong-il (PRK)	0	0

Quarterfinals
Besik Kudukhov (RUS)	1	2	5
Andy Moreno (CUB)	4	1	0

=== Repechage ===
Repechage round 1
Mikheil Japaridze (CAN)	0	2	0
Anil Kumar (IND)	2	1	3

Repechage round 2
Amiran Kardanov (GRE)	7	1	0
Sezar Akgül (TUR)	1	2	1
Anil Kumar (IND)	1	1	1
Fredy Serrano (COL)	3	0	3

Repechage round 3
Sezar Akgül (TUR)	0	2	3
Firas Al-Rifaei (SYR)	1	1	0
Fredy Serrano (COL)	0	1
Andy Moreno (CUB)	3	3

Bronze medals
Sezar Akgül (TUR)	1	1
Rizvan Gadzhiev (BLR)	3	3
Andy Moreno (CUB)	W	O
Dilshod Mansurov (UZB)
