= 2015 World Wrestling Championships – Men's freestyle 57 kg =

Men's freestyle 57 kg at the 2015 World Championships
- Venue: Orleans Arena
- Dates: 12 September 2015
- Competitors: 44 from 44 nations

Medalists
gold medal	Vladimer Khinchegashvili	Georgia
silver medal	Hassan Rahimi	Iran
bronze medal	Erdenebatyn Bekhbayar	Mongolia
bronze medal	Viktor Lebedev	Russia

The men's freestyle 57 kilograms is a competition featured at the 2015 World Wrestling Championships, and was held in Las Vegas, United States on 12 September.

== Results ==
Legend

- F — Won by fall

=== Finals ===
Semifinals		Final
Erdenebatyn Bekhbayar (MGL)	2
Vladimer Khinchegashvili (GEO)	10	Vladimer Khinchegashvili (GEO)	5
Viktor Lebedev (RUS)	0	Hassan Rahimi (IRI)	4
Hassan Rahimi (IRI)	5

=== Top half ===
==== Section 1 ====
Round of 64

Round of 32
Erdenebatyn Bekhbayar (MGL)	10
Aleksei Baskakov (EST)	0
Marno Plaatjies (RSA)	0
Ghenadie Tulbea (MON)	10
Yuki Takahashi (JPN)	10
Kevin Bonilla (HON)	0
Marcel Ewald (GER)	0
Mahir Amiraslanov (AZE)	7

Round of 16
Erdenebatyn Bekhbayar (MGL)	12
Ghenadie Tulbea (MON)	1
Yuki Takahashi (JPN)	5
Mahir Amiraslanov (AZE)	3

Quarterfinals
Erdenebatyn Bekhbayar (MGL)	2
Yuki Takahashi (JPN)	1

==== Section 2 ====
Round of 64

Round of 32
Mykola Aivazian (UKR)	0
Ivan Guidea (ROU)	2^{F}
Sem Shilimela (NAM)	1
Artas Sanaa (KAZ)	8
Salvatore Mannino (ITA)	0
Vladimer Khinchegashvili (GEO)	10
Georgi Vangelov (BUL)	5
Li Liang (CHN)	2

Round of 16
Ivan Guidea (ROU)	0
Artas Sanaa (KAZ)	7
Vladimer Khinchegashvili (GEO)	6
Georgi Vangelov (BUL)	1

Quarterfinals
Artas Sanaa (KAZ)	5
Vladimer Khinchegashvili (GEO)	7

=== Bottom half ===
==== Section 3 ====
Round of 64
Garik Barseghyan (ARM)	3
Sezar Akgül (TUR)	4
Amit Kumar Dahiya (IND)	3
Kim Sung-gwon (KOR)	3
Viktor Lebedev (RUS)	10
André Quispe (CHI)	0
Samat Nadyrbek Uulu (KGZ)	0
Yowlys Bonne (CUB)	10

Round of 32
Kalimen Pabro (MHL)	0
Islam Islamaj (ALB)	10^{F}
Zoheir El-Ouarraqe (FRA)	4
Chakir Ansari (MAR)	0
Sezar Akgül (TUR)	4
Amit Kumar Dahiya (IND)	6
Viktor Lebedev (RUS)	2
Yowlys Bonne (CUB)	2

Round of 16
Islam Islamaj (ALB)	0
Zoheir El-Ouarraqe (FRA)	10
Amit Kumar Dahiya (IND)	1
Viktor Lebedev (RUS)	2

Quarterfinals
Zoheir El-Ouarraqe (FRA)	2
Viktor Lebedev (RUS)	5

==== Section 4 ====
Round of 64
Asadulla Lachinau (BLR)	10
Dardan Syla (KOS)	0
Pedro Mejías (VEN)	3
Hassan Rahimi (IRI)	4
Makhmudjon Shavkatov (UZB)	11
Juan Pablo González (ESP)	6
Úber Cuero (COL)	1
Tony Ramos (USA)	10
Kumara Yaparathna (SRI)	0
John Pineda (CAN)	10
Adama Diatta (SEN)	5
Nikolay Noev (TJK)	1
Jong Hak-jin (PRK)	10
Uziel Correia (BRA)	0
József Molnár (HUN)	4
Anatolii Buruian (MDA)	8

Round of 32
Asadulla Lachinau (BLR)	0
Hassan Rahimi (IRI)	7
Makhmudjon Shavkatov (UZB)	3
Tony Ramos (USA)	3
John Pineda (CAN)	2
Adama Diatta (SEN)	6
Jong Hak-jin (PRK)	9
Anatolii Buruian (MDA)	2

Round of 16
Hassan Rahimi (IRI)	3
Tony Ramos (USA)	1
Adama Diatta (SEN)	2
Jong Hak-jin (PRK)	5

Quarterfinals
Hassan Rahimi (IRI)	5
Jong Hak-jin (PRK)	3

=== Repechage ===
Repechage round 1
Pedro Mejías (VEN)	2
Asadulla Lachinau (BLR)	9

Repechage round 2
Salvatore Mannino (ITA)	0
Georgi Vangelov (BUL)	11
Asadulla Lachinau (BLR)	6
Tony Ramos (USA)	1

Repechage round 3
Georgi Vangelov (BUL)	0
Artas Sanaa (KAZ)	7
Asadulla Lachinau (BLR)	4
Jong Hak-jin (PRK)	12

Bronze medals
Artas Sanaa (KAZ)	1
Erdenebatyn Bekhbayar (MGL)	5
Jong Hak-jin (PRK)	0
Viktor Lebedev (RUS)	3
