= 2013 World Wrestling Championships – Men's freestyle 60 kg =

Men's freestyle 60 kg at the 2013 World Championships
- Venue: László Papp Budapest Sports Arena
- Dates: 17 September 2013
- Competitors: 39 from 39 nations

Medalists
gold medal	Bekkhan Goygereev	Russia
silver medal	Vladimir Dubov	Bulgaria
bronze medal	Bajrang Punia	India
bronze medal	Masoud Esmaeilpour	Iran

The men's freestyle 60 kilograms is a competition featured at the 2013 World Wrestling Championships, and was held at the László Papp Budapest Sports Arena in Budapest, Hungary on 17 September 2013.

== Results ==
Legend

- F — Won by fall
- R — Retired
- WO — Won by walkover

=== Finals ===
Semifinals		Final
Enkhsaikhany Nyam-Ochir (MGL)	0
Vladimir Dubov (BUL)	5	Vladimir Dubov (BUL)	2
Masoud Esmaeilpour (IRI)	0	Bekkhan Goygereev (RUS)	10^{F}
Bekkhan Goygereev (RUS)	8

=== Top half ===
==== Section 1 ====
Round of 64

Round of 32
Vladimer Khinchegashvili (GEO)	9
Abel Herrera (PER)	6
Lee Seung-chul (KOR)	16
Alejandro Valdés (CUB)	6
Nikolay Noev (TJK)	2
Enkhsaikhany Nyam-Ochir (MGL)	3
Aleksei Baskakov (EST)	3^{F}
Nasibullo Kurbanov (UZB)	4

Round of 16
Vladimer Khinchegashvili (GEO)	8
Lee Seung-chul (KOR)	0
Enkhsaikhany Nyam-Ochir (MGL)	7
Aleksei Baskakov (EST)	0

Quarterfinals
Vladimer Khinchegashvili (GEO)	5
Enkhsaikhany Nyam-Ochir (MGL)	8

==== Section 2 ====
Round of 64

Round of 32
Ibsen Aguilar (VEN)	5
Ivan Guidea (ROU)	15
Jean Bernard Diatta (SEN)	0
John Pineda (CAN)	3^{F}
Luis Portillo (ESA)	0
Shogo Maeda (JPN)	7
Bajrang Punia (IND)	0
Vladimir Dubov (BUL)	7

Round of 16
Ivan Guidea (ROU)	3
John Pineda (CAN)	1
Shogo Maeda (JPN)	5^{R}
Vladimir Dubov (BUL)	9

Quarterfinals
Ivan Guidea (ROU)	1
Vladimir Dubov (BUL)	8

=== Bottom half ===
==== Section 3 ====
Round of 64

Round of 32
Haji Aliyev (AZE)	7
Masoud Esmaeilpour (IRI)	9^{F}
Marno Plaatjies (RSA)	1
Krzysztof Bieńkowski (POL)	8
Reece Humphrey (USA)	4^{F}
Mykola Aivazian (UKR)	3
Erhan Bakır (TUR)	8
Samitha Priyankara (SRI)	0

Round of 16
Masoud Esmaeilpour (IRI)	8
Krzysztof Bieńkowski (POL)	0
Reece Humphrey (USA)	7
Erhan Bakır (TUR)	0

Quarterfinals
Masoud Esmaeilpour (IRI)	9
Reece Humphrey (USA)	8

==== Section 4 ====
Round of 64
Ibrahim Farag (EGY)	0
Mykola Bolotňuk (SVK)	7
Asadulla Lachinau (BLR)	10
József Molnár (HUN)	5
Artur Arakelyan (ARM)	11
Ma Cunjun (CHN)	2
Joseph Guillaume (MRI)	0
Hwang Ryon-ghak (PRK)	8
Franklin Gómez (PUR)	6^{F}
Bazar Bazarguruev (KGZ)	0
Daulet Niyazbekov (KAZ)	8
Andrei Prepeliţă (MDA)	10
Brandon Díaz (MEX)	0
Bekkhan Goygereev (RUS)	8

Round of 32
Vilson Ndregjoni (ALB)	2
Mykola Bolotňuk (SVK)	8
Asadulla Lachinau (BLR)	0
Artur Arakelyan (ARM)	8
Hwang Ryon-ghak (PRK)	6
Franklin Gómez (PUR)	8
Andrei Prepeliţă (MDA)	0
Bekkhan Goygereev (RUS)	8

Round of 16
Mykola Bolotňuk (SVK)	0
Artur Arakelyan (ARM)	4^{F}
Franklin Gómez (PUR)	5
Bekkhan Goygereev (RUS)	13

Quarterfinals
Artur Arakelyan (ARM)	5
Bekkhan Goygereev (RUS)	13

=== Repechage ===
Repechage round 1
Brandon Díaz (MEX)	0
Andrei Prepeliţă (MDA)	8

Repechage round 2
Bajrang Punia (IND)	WO
Shogo Maeda (JPN)
Andrei Prepeliţă (MDA)	1
Franklin Gómez (PUR)	5

Repechage round 3
Bajrang Punia (IND)	10
Ivan Guidea (ROU)	3
Franklin Gómez (PUR)	4
Artur Arakelyan (ARM)	6

Bronze medals
Bajrang Punia (IND)	9
Enkhsaikhany Nyam-Ochir (MGL)	2
Artur Arakelyan (ARM)	0
Masoud Esmaeilpour (IRI)	7
