= Wrestling at the 2012 Summer Olympics – Men's freestyle 55 kg =

Men's freestyle 55 kg at the Games of the XXX Olympiad
- Venue: ExCeL London
- Date: 10 August 2012
- Competitors: 19 from 19 nations

Medalists
1st place, gold medalist(s)		Dzhamal Otarsultanov	Russia
2nd place, silver medalist(s)		Vladimer Khinchegashvili	Georgia
3rd place, bronze medalist(s)		Yang Kyong-il	North Korea
3rd place, bronze medalist(s)		Shinichi Yumoto	Japan

Men's freestyle 55 kilograms competition at the 2012 Summer Olympics in London, United Kingdom, took place on 10 August at ExCeL London. This freestyle wrestling competition consisted of a single-elimination tournament, with a repechage used to determine the winners of two bronze medals. The two finalists faced off for gold and silver medals. Each wrestler who lost to one of the two finalists moved into the repechage, culminating in a pair of bronze medal matches featuring the semifinal losers each facing the remaining repechage opponent from their half of the bracket.

Each bout consisted of up to three rounds, lasting two minutes apiece. The wrestler who scored more points in each round was the winner of that rounds; the bout finished when one wrestler had won two rounds (and thus the match).

== Schedule ==
All times are British Summer Time (UTC+01:00)

Date	Time	Event
10 August 2012	13:00	Qualification rounds
10 August 2012	17:45	Repechage
10 August 2012	18:45	Finals

== Results ==
=== Final ===
Final
Dzhamal Otarsultanov (RUS)	1	4
Vladimer Khinchegashvili (GEO)	0	3

=== Top half ===
Qualifications

1/8 finals
Sam Hazewinkel (USA)	1	0
Daulet Niyazbekov (KAZ)	3	2
Ahmet Peker (TUR)	1	1
David Tremblay (CAN)	0	1
Yang Kyong-il (PRK)	0	1	2
Dilshod Mansurov (UZB)	1	1	0
Dzhamal Otarsultanov (RUS)	3	7
Sem Shilimela (NAM)	0	0

1/4 finals
Daulet Niyazbekov (KAZ)	0	1	2
Ahmet Peker (TUR)	1	0	0
Yang Kyong-il (PRK)	1	1
Dzhamal Otarsultanov (RUS)	3	3

Semifinals
Daulet Niyazbekov (KAZ)	2	0
Dzhamal Otarsultanov (RUS)	3	3

=== Bottom half ===
Qualifications
Bayaraagiin Naranbaatar (MGL)	0	0
Hassan Rahimi (IRI)	2	3
Radoslav Velikov (BUL)	1	1
Nikolay Noev (TJK)	0	0
Vladimer Khinchegashvili (GEO)	1	5	2
Ibrahim Farag (EGY)	1	2	0

1/8 finals
Kim Jin-cheol (KOR)	1	2	0
Shinichi Yumoto (JPN)	0	4	1
Mihran Jaburyan (ARM)	6	6
Brandon Escobar (HON)	3	0
Amit Kumar Dahiya (IND)	0	1	1
Hassan Rahimi (IRI)	1	0	1
Radoslav Velikov (BUL)	3	1	0
Vladimer Khinchegashvili (GEO)	0	1	4

1/4 finals
Shinichi Yumoto (JPN)	4	6
Mihran Jaburyan (ARM)	1	0
Amit Kumar Dahiya (IND)	0	1
Vladimer Khinchegashvili (GEO)	4	3

Semifinals
Shinichi Yumoto (JPN)	0	4	0
Vladimer Khinchegashvili (GEO)	1	0	2

=== Repechage ===
Repechage round 1
Ibrahim Farag (EGY)	0	0
Radoslav Velikov (BUL)	3	3

Repechage round 2
Sem Shilimela (NAM)	2	0
Yang Kyong-il (PRK)	7	6
Radoslav Velikov (BUL)	1	1
Amit Kumar Dahiya (IND)	0	0

Bronze medals
Yang Kyong-il (PRK)	2	6
Daulet Niyazbekov (KAZ)	2	0
Radoslav Velikov (BUL)	1	1
Shinichi Yumoto (JPN)	1	1

== Final standing ==
Rank	Athlete
1st place, gold medalist(s)	Dzhamal Otarsultanov (RUS)
2nd place, silver medalist(s)	Vladimer Khinchegashvili (GEO)
3rd place, bronze medalist(s)	Yang Kyong-il (PRK)
3rd place, bronze medalist(s)	Shinichi Yumoto (JPN)
5	Daulet Niyazbekov (KAZ)
5	Radoslav Velikov (BUL)
7	Mihran Jaburyan (ARM)
8	Hassan Rahimi (IRI)
9	Ahmet Peker (TUR)
10	Amit Kumar Dahiya (IND)
11	Kim Jin-cheol (KOR)
12	Brandon Escobar (HON)
13	Ibrahim Farag (EGY)
14	Dilshod Mansurov (UZB)
15	Sem Shilimela (NAM)
16	David Tremblay (CAN)
17	Sam Hazewinkel (USA)
18	Nikolay Noev (TJK)
19	Bayaraagiin Naranbaatar (MGL)
