= Wrestling at the 2014 Asian Games – Men's freestyle 57 kg =

Men's freestyle 57 kg at the 2014 Asian Games
- Venue: Dowon Gymnasium
- Date: 27 September 2014
- Competitors: 15 from 15 nations

Medalists
gold medal	Jong Hak-jin	North Korea
silver medal	Rassul Kaliyev	Kazakhstan
bronze medal	Batboldyn Nomin	Mongolia
bronze medal	Yun Jun-sik	South Korea

The men's freestyle 57 kilograms wrestling competition at the 2014 Asian Games in Incheon was held on 27 September 2014 at the Dowon Gymnasium.

== Schedule ==
All times are Korea Standard Time (UTC+09:00)

Date	Time	Event
Saturday, 27 September 2014	13:00	1/8 finals
Saturday, 27 September 2014	13:00	Quarterfinals
Saturday, 27 September 2014	13:00	Semifinals
Saturday, 27 September 2014	13:00	Repechages
Saturday, 27 September 2014	19:00	Finals

== Results ==
Legend

- F — Won by fall

=== Main bracket ===
1/8 finals
Batboldyn Nomin (MGL)	6^{F}
Firas Al-Rifaei (SYR)	0
Amit Kumar Dahiya (IND)	2
Fumitaka Morishita (JPN)	2
Ramil Rejepow (TKM)	10
Muhammad Bilal (PAK)	0
Fahad Ghazwani (KSA)	0
Rassul Kaliyev (KAZ)	10
Nikolay Noev (TJK)	12
Basheer Al-Yamani (YEM)	2
Hassan Rahimi (IRI)	10
Samat Nadyrbek Uulu (KGZ)	0
Hong Xiaobin (CHN)	2
Yun Jun-sik (KOR)	13

Quarterfinals
Jong Hak-jin (PRK)	11
Batboldyn Nomin (MGL)	8
Fumitaka Morishita (JPN)	6
Ramil Rejepow (TKM)	0
Rassul Kaliyev (KAZ)	7
Nikolay Noev (TJK)	2
Hassan Rahimi (IRI)	0
Yun Jun-sik (KOR)	1

Semifinals
Jong Hak-jin (PRK)	4
Fumitaka Morishita (JPN)	2
Rassul Kaliyev (KAZ)	9
Yun Jun-sik (KOR)	3

Gold medal
Jong Hak-jin (PRK)	8
Rassul Kaliyev (KAZ)	6

=== Repechage ===
Repechage
Fahad Ghazwani (KSA)	0
Nikolay Noev (TJK)	8^{F}

Bronze medals
Batboldyn Nomin (MGL)	5
Fumitaka Morishita (JPN)	3
Nikolay Noev (TJK)	2
Yun Jun-sik (KOR)	5

== Final standing ==
Rank	Athlete
1st place, gold medalist(s)	Jong Hak-jin (PRK)
2nd place, silver medalist(s)	Rassul Kaliyev (KAZ)
3rd place, bronze medalist(s)	Batboldyn Nomin (MGL)
3rd place, bronze medalist(s)	Yun Jun-sik (KOR)
5	Fumitaka Morishita (JPN)
5	Nikolay Noev (TJK)
7	Hassan Rahimi (IRI)
8	Ramil Rejepow (TKM)
9	Amit Kumar Dahiya (IND)
10	Basheer Al-Yamani (YEM)
11	Hong Xiaobin (CHN)
12	Firas Al-Rifaei (SYR)
13	Muhammad Bilal (PAK)
13	Samat Nadyrbek Uulu (KGZ)
15	Fahad Ghazwani (KSA)
