= 2005 World Wrestling Championships – Men's freestyle 55 kg =

Men's freestyle 55 kg at the 2005 World Championships
- Venue: László Papp Budapest Sports Arena
- Dates: 26 September 2005
- Competitors: 30 from 30 nations

Medalists
gold medal	Dilshod Mansurov	Uzbekistan
silver medal	Radoslav Velikov	Bulgaria
bronze medal	Jon Hyon-guk	North Korea
bronze medal	Bayaraagiin Naranbaatar	Mongolia

The men's freestyle 55 kilograms is a competition featured at the 2005 World Wrestling Championships, and was held at the László Papp Budapest Sports Arena in Budapest, Hungary on 26 September 2005.

This freestyle wrestling competition consists of a single-elimination tournament, with a repechage used to determine the winner of two bronze medals.

== Results ==
Legend

- F — Won by fall

=== Final ===
Final
Radoslav Velikov (BUL)	0	0
Dilshod Mansurov (UZB)	1	1

=== Top half ===
Round of 32
Taghi Dadashi (IRI)	3	4
Marcel Ewald (GER)	0	0
Radoslav Velikov (BUL)	2	2
Ghenadie Tulbea (MDA)	2	0
Namig Abdullayev (AZE)	2	4
Roman Kollar (SVK)	0	0
Zsolt Bánkuti (HUN)	6	6
Mohammad Hammad (LIB)	0	0
Zalimkhan Kutseev (RUS)	2	7
Jamie Macari (CAN)	1	0
Sammie Henson (USA)	2	2	4
Vytas Čumakovas (LTU)	3	0	0

Round of 16
Jon Hyon-guk (PRK)	2	3
Nurlan Turarbek Uulu (KGZ)	0	0
Taghi Dadashi (IRI)	3	0	1
Radoslav Velikov (BUL)	1	1	4^{F}
Namig Abdullayev (AZE)	1	3
Zsolt Bánkuti (HUN)	0	0
Zalimkhan Kutseev (RUS)	1	7
Sammie Henson (USA)	1	0

Quarterfinals
Jon Hyon-guk (PRK)	0	0
Radoslav Velikov (BUL)	2	3
Namig Abdullayev (AZE)	1	2
Zalimkhan Kutseev (RUS)	0	0

Semifinals
Radoslav Velikov (BUL)	1	4
Namig Abdullayev (AZE)	1	0

=== Bottom half ===
Round of 32
René Montero (CUB)	5	1
Gocha Kirkitadze (GEO)	0	0
Tomohiro Matsunaga (JPN)	6	7
Francisco Sánchez (ESP)	0	0
Elgin Loren Elwais (PLW)	0	0
Yang Jae-hoon (KOR)	3	6
Aliaksandr Lasitsa (BLR)	0	3	4
Mihran Jaburyan (ARM)	4	0	2
Bayaraagiin Naranbaatar (MGL)	3	4
Firas Al-Rifaei (SYR)	0	2
Asset Serikbayev (KAZ)	3	0	1
Bi Hongrong (CHN)	0	1	0
Dilshod Mansurov (UZB)	4	4
Hussain Gowdooei (QAT)	0	0
Abbas Ulucan (TUR)	0	1
Gevork Markaryan (UKR)	1	2

Round of 16
René Montero (CUB)	2	2	4
Tomohiro Matsunaga (JPN)	0	2	5
Yang Jae-hoon (KOR)	3	7
Aliaksandr Lasitsa (BLR)	2	0
Bayaraagiin Naranbaatar (MGL)	3	6
Asset Serikbayev (KAZ)	0	0
Dilshod Mansurov (UZB)	3	1
Gevork Markaryan (UKR)	0	0

Quarterfinals
Tomohiro Matsunaga (JPN)	3	3
Yang Jae-hoon (KOR)	3	1
Bayaraagiin Naranbaatar (MGL)	1	1
Dilshod Mansurov (UZB)	0	3^{F}

Semifinals
Tomohiro Matsunaga (JPN)	0	0
Dilshod Mansurov (UZB)	1	1

=== Repechage ===
Repechage round 1
Ghenadie Tulbea (MDA)	4	1	4
Taghi Dadashi (IRI)	1	1	0
Hussain Gowdooei (QAT)	0	0
Gevork Markaryan (UKR)	7	7

Repechage round 2
Ghenadie Tulbea (MDA)	1	0
Jon Hyon-guk (PRK)	3	5
Gevork Markaryan (UKR)	0	0
Bayaraagiin Naranbaatar (MGL)	2	7

Bronze medals
Jon Hyon-guk (PRK)	3	1
Namig Abdullayev (AZE)	0	0
Bayaraagiin Naranbaatar (MGL)	5	2
Tomohiro Matsunaga (JPN)	3	0
