= 2014 World Wrestling Championships – Men's freestyle 57 kg =

Men's freestyle 57 kg at the 2014 World Championships
- Venue: Gymnastics Sport Palace
- Dates: 8 September 2014
- Competitors: 30 from 30 nations

Medalists
gold medal	Yang Kyong-il	North Korea
silver medal	Vladimer Khinchegashvili	Georgia
bronze medal	Hassan Rahimi	Iran
bronze medal	Uladzislau Andreyeu	Belarus

The men's freestyle 57 kilograms is a competition featured at the 2014 World Wrestling Championships, and was held in Tashkent, Uzbekistan on 8 September 2014.

This freestyle wrestling competition consisted of a single-elimination tournament, with a repechage used to determine the winners of two bronze medals.

== Results ==
Legend

- F — Won by fall

=== Final ===
Final
Yang Kyong-il (PRK)	5
Vladimer Khinchegashvili (GEO)	3

=== Top half ===
Round of 32
Nasibullo Kurbanov (UZB)	4
Yuki Takahashi (JPN)	11
Altynbek Alymbaev (KGZ)	2
Shokan Shingissov (KAZ)	2
Ghenadie Tulbea (MON)	1
Viktor Lebedev (RUS)	5
Marcel Ewald (GER)	3
Pedro Mejías (VEN)	6
Hassan Rahimi (IRI)	6^{F}
Levan Metreveli (ESP)	0
Garik Barseghyan (ARM)	0
Mykola Aivazian (UKR)	4

Round of 16
Yang Kyong-il (PRK)	11
Kim Sung-gwon (KOR)	1
Yuki Takahashi (JPN)	10
Shokan Shingissov (KAZ)	0
Viktor Lebedev (RUS)	5
Pedro Mejías (VEN)	0
Hassan Rahimi (IRI)	10
Mykola Aivazian (UKR)	2

Quarterfinals
Yang Kyong-il (PRK)	10
Yuki Takahashi (JPN)	1
Viktor Lebedev (RUS)	1
Hassan Rahimi (IRI)	7^{F}

Semifinals
Yang Kyong-il (PRK)	5
Hassan Rahimi (IRI)	5

=== Bottom half ===
Round of 32
Akhmednabi Gvarzatilov (AZE)	8
Alexandru Chirtoacă (MDA)	2
Vladimer Khinchegashvili (GEO)	10
André Quispe (CHI)	0
Steven Takahashi (CAN)	2
Andrei Dukov (ROU)	9
Uladzislau Andreyeu (BLR)	3
Zoheir El-Ouarraqe (FRA)	1
Mehmed Feraim (BUL)	9
Sem Shilimela (NAM)	2
Guyliane Bandou (MRI)	2
Qi Mude (CHN)	14
Tony Ramos (USA)	4
Erdenebatyn Bekhbayar (MGL)	7
Ahmet Peker (TUR)	0
Rahul Aware (IND)	10

Round of 16
Akhmednabi Gvarzatilov (AZE)	2
Vladimer Khinchegashvili (GEO)	8
Andrei Dukov (ROU)	0
Uladzislau Andreyeu (BLR)	2
Mehmed Feraim (BUL)	4
Qi Mude (CHN)	4
Erdenebatyn Bekhbayar (MGL)	9
Rahul Aware (IND)	8

Quarterfinals
Vladimer Khinchegashvili (GEO)	4
Uladzislau Andreyeu (BLR)	0
Mehmed Feraim (BUL)	0
Erdenebatyn Bekhbayar (MGL)	4

Semifinals
Vladimer Khinchegashvili (GEO)	6
Erdenebatyn Bekhbayar (MGL)	3

=== Repechage ===
Repechage round 1
André Quispe (CHI)	0
Akhmednabi Gvarzatilov (AZE)	11

Repechage round 2
Kim Sung-gwon (KOR)	0
Yuki Takahashi (JPN)	5
Akhmednabi Gvarzatilov (AZE)	0
Uladzislau Andreyeu (BLR)	6

Bronze medals
Yuki Takahashi (JPN)	4
Hassan Rahimi (IRI)	7
Uladzislau Andreyeu (BLR)	1
Erdenebatyn Bekhbayar (MGL)	1
