= 2012 Asian Wrestling Championships =

- Host city: Gumi, South Korea
- Dates: 16–19 February 2012
- Stadium: Park Chung-hee Gymnasium

Champions
- Freestyle: Iran
- Greco-Roman: Iran
- Women: China

The 2012 Asian Wrestling Championships were held at the Park Chung-hee Gymnasium in Gumi, South Korea. The event took place from February 16 to February 19, 2012.

== Medal table ==
Rank	Nation	Gold	Silver	Bronze	Total
1	Iran	8	2	2	12
2	China	4	3	5	12
3	Kazakhstan	3	3	7	13
4	Japan	2	4	7	13
5	South Korea	2	3	5	10
6	India	1	0	4	5
6	Kyrgyzstan	1	0	4	5
8	Mongolia	0	2	4	6
9	Uzbekistan	0	2	2	4
10	Chinese Taipei	0	1	0	1
10	Vietnam	0	1	0	1
12	Tajikistan	0	0	2	2
Totals (12 entries)		21	21	42	84

== Team ranking ==
Rank	Men's freestyle		Men's Greco-Roman		Women's freestyle	
Rank	Team	Points	Team	Points	Team	Points
1	Iran	67	Iran	54	China	59
2	Japan	49	China	51	Japan	58
3	China	44	South Korea	47	Kazakhstan	55
4	Mongolia	44	Kazakhstan	45	Mongolia	48
5	India	38	Japan	45	Kyrgyzstan	44
6	Kazakhstan	38	Uzbekistan	40	South Korea	33
7	South Korea	34	Kyrgyzstan	29	Vietnam	28
8	Kyrgyzstan	27	India	26	India	28
9	Tajikistan	20	Jordan	17	Chinese Taipei	18
10	Uzbekistan	18	Tajikistan	14	Uzbekistan	9

== Medal summary ==
=== Men's freestyle ===
Event	Gold	Silver	Bronze
55 kg	Hassan Rahimi; Iran	Yasuhiro Inaba; Japan	Amit Kumar Dahiya; India
55 kg	Hassan Rahimi; Iran	Yasuhiro Inaba; Japan	Kim Jin-cheol; South Korea
60 kg	Yogeshwar Dutt; India	Masoud Esmaeilpour; Iran	Banzragchiin Bayanmönkh; Mongolia
60 kg	Yogeshwar Dutt; India	Masoud Esmaeilpour; Iran	Tomotsugu Ishida; Japan
66 kg	Mehdi Taghavi; Iran	Maxat Daulbayev; Kazakhstan	Parveen Rana; India
66 kg	Mehdi Taghavi; Iran	Maxat Daulbayev; Kazakhstan	Park Nam-chun; South Korea
74 kg	Sadegh Goudarzi; Iran	Abdulkhakim Shapiyev; Kazakhstan	Takafumi Kojima; Japan
74 kg	Sadegh Goudarzi; Iran	Abdulkhakim Shapiyev; Kazakhstan	Zhang Chongyao; China
84 kg	Ehsan Lashgari; Iran	Lee Jae-sung; South Korea	Yusup Abdusalomov; Tajikistan
84 kg	Ehsan Lashgari; Iran	Lee Jae-sung; South Korea	Naoki Momma; Japan
96 kg	Magomed Musaev; Kyrgyzstan	Kim Jae-kang; South Korea	Dorjkhandyn Khüderbulga; Mongolia
96 kg	Magomed Musaev; Kyrgyzstan	Kim Jae-kang; South Korea	Erfan Amiri; Iran
120 kg	Parviz Hadi; Iran	Liang Lei; China	Yerzhan Duissenbekov; Kazakhstan
120 kg	Parviz Hadi; Iran	Liang Lei; China	Jargalsaikhany Chuluunbat; Mongolia

=== Men's Greco-Roman ===
Event	Gold	Silver	Bronze
55 kg	Lee Jung-baik; South Korea	Elmurat Tasmuradov; Uzbekistan	Kanybek Zholchubekov; Kyrgyzstan
55 kg	Lee Jung-baik; South Korea	Elmurat Tasmuradov; Uzbekistan	Shota Tanokura; Japan
60 kg	Yerbol Konyratov; Kazakhstan	Kazuma Kuramoto; Japan	Woo Seung-jae; South Korea
60 kg	Yerbol Konyratov; Kazakhstan	Kazuma Kuramoto; Japan	Atai Koichukulov; Kyrgyzstan
66 kg	Zheng Pan; China	Afshin Biabangard; Iran	Vladimir Pogudin; Uzbekistan
66 kg	Zheng Pan; China	Afshin Biabangard; Iran	Yeldar Kairatov; Kazakhstan
74 kg	Hadi Alizadeh; Iran	Takehiro Kanakubo; Japan	Tian Hailong; China
74 kg	Hadi Alizadeh; Iran	Takehiro Kanakubo; Japan	Asset Adilov; Kazakhstan
84 kg	Habibollah Akhlaghi; Iran	Besiki Saldadze; Uzbekistan	Maxat Yerezhepov; Kazakhstan
84 kg	Habibollah Akhlaghi; Iran	Besiki Saldadze; Uzbekistan	Duan Ning; China
96 kg	Davoud Gilneirang; Iran	Xiao Di; China	Ruslan Kamilov; Uzbekistan
96 kg	Davoud Gilneirang; Iran	Xiao Di; China	An Chang-gun; South Korea
120 kg	Kim Yong-min; South Korea	Abdulmalik Sartbayev; Kazakhstan	Mohammad Ghorbani; Iran
120 kg	Kim Yong-min; South Korea	Abdulmalik Sartbayev; Kazakhstan	Murodjon Tuychiev; Tajikistan

=== Women's freestyle ===
Event	Gold	Silver	Bronze
48 kg	Zhao Shasha; China	Lee Yu-mi; South Korea	Mikhrniso Nurmatova; Kyrgyzstan
48 kg	Zhao Shasha; China	Lee Yu-mi; South Korea	Eri Tosaka; Japan
51 kg	Li Hui; China	Yu Miyahara; Japan	Kim Hyung-joo; South Korea
51 kg	Li Hui; China	Yu Miyahara; Japan	Neha Rathi; India
55 kg	Kanako Murata; Japan	Trần Thị Diệu Ninh; Vietnam	Aizhan Ismagulova; Kazakhstan
55 kg	Kanako Murata; Japan	Trần Thị Diệu Ninh; Vietnam	Geeta Phogat; India
59 kg	Kayoko Shimada; Japan	Yang Senlian; China	Aiyim Abdildina; Kazakhstan
59 kg	Kayoko Shimada; Japan	Yang Senlian; China	Enkhbayaryn Tsevegmid; Mongolia
63 kg	Xu Haiyan; China	Hou Min-wen; Chinese Taipei	Tatyana Zakharova; Kazakhstan
63 kg	Xu Haiyan; China	Hou Min-wen; Chinese Taipei	Rio Watari; Japan
67 kg	Yelena Shalygina; Kazakhstan	Tsedendorjiin Bayarzayaa; Mongolia	Altynai Anarbek Kyzy; Kyrgyzstan
67 kg	Yelena Shalygina; Kazakhstan	Tsedendorjiin Bayarzayaa; Mongolia	Liu Xinyi; China
72 kg	Guzel Manyurova; Kazakhstan	Badrakhyn Odonchimeg; Mongolia	Hong Yan; China
72 kg	Guzel Manyurova; Kazakhstan	Badrakhyn Odonchimeg; Mongolia	Mami Shinkai; Japan

== Participating nations ==
244 competitors from 22 nations competed.

- Cambodia (1)
- China (21)
- Chinese Taipei (16)
- India (19)
- Iran (14)
- Iraq (7)
- Japan (21)
- Jordan (5)
- Kazakhstan (21)
- Kyrgyzstan (21)
- Mongolia (14)
- Philippines (5)
- Qatar (3)
- South Korea (21)
- Syria (4)
- Tajikistan (10)
- Thailand (3)
- Turkmenistan (8)
- United Arab Emirates (3)
- Uzbekistan (18)
- Vietnam (7)
- Yemen (2)
