= Wrestling at the 2010 Asian Games – Men's freestyle 55 kg =

Men's freestyle 55 kg at the 2010 Asian Games
- Venue: Huagong Gymnasium
- Date: 23 November 2010
- Competitors: 16 from 16 nations

Medalists
gold medal	Dilshod Mansurov	Uzbekistan
silver medal	Yang Kyong-il	North Korea
bronze medal	Yasuhiro Inaba	Japan
bronze medal	Kim Hyo-sub	South Korea

The men's freestyle 55 kg wrestling competition at the 2010 Asian Games in Guangzhou was held on 23 November 2010 at the Huagong Gymnasium.

This freestyle wrestling competition consisted of a single-elimination tournament, with a repechage used to determine the winner of two bronze medals. The two finalists faced off for gold and silver medals. Each wrestler who lost to one of the two finalists moved into the repechage, culminating in a pair of bronze medal matches featuring the semifinal losers each facing the remaining repechage opponent from their half of the bracket.

Each bout consisted of up to three rounds, lasting two minutes apiece. The wrestler who scored more points in each round was the winner of that rounds; the bout finished when one wrestler had won two rounds (and thus the match).

== Schedule ==
All times are China Standard Time (UTC+08:00)

Date	Time	Event
Tuesday, 23 November 2010	09:30	1/8 finals
Tuesday, 23 November 2010	09:30	Quarterfinals
Tuesday, 23 November 2010	09:30	Semifinals
Tuesday, 23 November 2010	16:00	Repechages
Tuesday, 23 November 2010	17:00	Finals

== Results ==
Legend

- F — Won by fall

=== Main bracket ===
1/8 finals
Nurlan Makenaliev (KGZ)	0	1
Yasuhiro Inaba (JPN)	2	4
Firas Al-Rifaei (SYR)	0	0
Daulet Niyazbekov (KAZ)	6	7
Vinod Kumar (IND)	0	0
Damdinbazaryn Tsogtbaatar (MGL)	3	3
Yang Kyong-il (PRK)	6	6
Jerry Angana (PHI)	0	0
Ramil Rejepow (TKM)	0	2	0
Hassan Rahimi (IRI)	2	1	1
Basheer Al-Yamani (YEM)	0	0
Dilshod Mansurov (UZB)	1	6
Chen Hua (CHN)	4	4^{F}
Azhar Hussain (PAK)	1	0
Nguyễn Huy Hà (VIE)	0	0
Kim Hyo-sub (KOR)	6	3

Quarterfinals
Yasuhiro Inaba (JPN)	3	3
Daulet Niyazbekov (KAZ)	0	0
Damdinbazaryn Tsogtbaatar (MGL)	2	0	2
Yang Kyong-il (PRK)	2	1	3
Hassan Rahimi (IRI)	0	0
Dilshod Mansurov (UZB)	2	1
Chen Hua (CHN)	1	2
Kim Hyo-sub (KOR)	3	3

Semifinals
Yasuhiro Inaba (JPN)	0	0
Yang Kyong-il (PRK)	6	6
Dilshod Mansurov (UZB)	1	7
Kim Hyo-sub (KOR)	0	0

Final
Yang Kyong-il (PRK)	0	2
Dilshod Mansurov (UZB)	3	3

=== Repechage ===
Repechage round 1
Jerry Angana (PHI)	0	0
Damdinbazaryn Tsogtbaatar (MGL)	7	7
Basheer Al-Yamani (YEM)	0	0
Hassan Rahimi (IRI)	5	5

Bronze medals
Damdinbazaryn Tsogtbaatar (MGL)	0	0
Yasuhiro Inaba (JPN)	1	3
Hassan Rahimi (IRI)	1	0	0
Kim Hyo-sub (KOR)	0	1	4

== Final standing ==
Rank	Athlete
1st place, gold medalist(s)	Dilshod Mansurov (UZB)
2nd place, silver medalist(s)	Yang Kyong-il (PRK)
3rd place, bronze medalist(s)	Yasuhiro Inaba (JPN)
3rd place, bronze medalist(s)	Kim Hyo-sub (KOR)
5	Damdinbazaryn Tsogtbaatar (MGL)
5	Hassan Rahimi (IRI)
7	Chen Hua (CHN)
8	Daulet Niyazbekov (KAZ)
9	Ramil Rejepow (TKM)
10	Nurlan Makenaliev (KGZ)
11	Azhar Hussain (PAK)
12	Vinod Kumar (IND)
13	Nguyễn Huy Hà (VIE)
14	Firas Al-Rifaei (SYR)
15	Basheer Al-Yamani (YEM)
16	Jerry Angana (PHI)
