= Hassan Rahimi =

Iranian wrestler (born 1989)

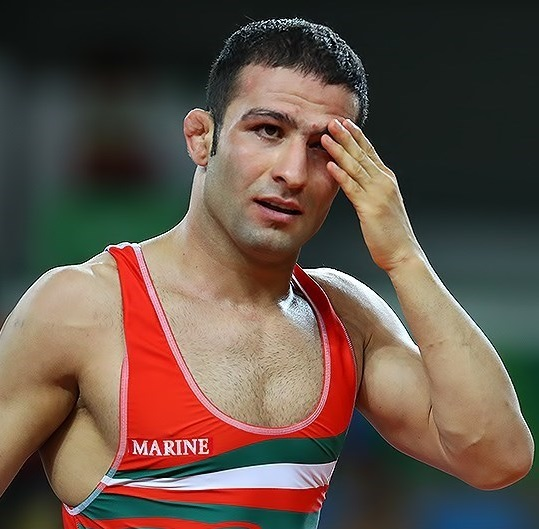
- Hassan Rahimi at the 2016 Olympic Games

Personal information
- Native name: حسن سبزعلی رحیمی
- Full name: Hassan Sabzali Rahimi
- Nationality: Iran
- Born: 15 June 1989 (age 37) Tehran, Iran
- Height: 1.60 m (5 ft 3 in)

Sport
- Country: Iran
- Sport: Wrestling
- Weight class: 57 kg
- Event: Freestyle

Achievements and titles
- Olympic finals: (bronze) (2016)
- World finals: (gold) (2013) (silver) (2015) (bronze) (2014) (bronze) (2011)
- Regional finals: (gold) (2012) (bronze) (2009)
Medal record
Men's Freestyle wrestling
Representing Iran
Olympic Games
Bronze medal – third place	2016 Rio de Janeiro	57 kg
World Championships
Gold medal – first place	2013 Budapest	55 kg
Silver medal – second place	2015 Las Vegas	57 kg
Bronze medal – third place	2011 Istanbul	55 kg
Bronze medal – third place	2014 Tashkent	57 kg
World Cup
Gold medal – first place	2016 Los Angeles	57 kg
Gold medal – first place	2015 Los Angeles	57 kg
Gold medal – first place	2014 Los Angeles	57 kg
Silver medal – second place	2013 Tehran	55 kg
Silver medal – second place	2010 Moscow	55 kg
Asian Championships
Gold medal – first place	2012 Gumi	55 kg
Bronze medal – third place	2009 Pattaya	55 kg

Hassan Rahimi (Persian: حسن رحيمى, born 15 June 1989) is an Iranian wrestler. He was born in Tehran, Iran, and grown up in Yaftabad Tehran. In 2008, he became the Junior Asian Champion and Junior World silver medalist. In 2009 he became the Junior World Champion. In 2010 he became Military World Champion. In 2011, he won the bronze medal at the World Championships. In 2012, he became the Asian Champion, but at the 2012 Summer Olympics, he ranked eighth. In 2013 he became World Champion. At the 2014 World Championships he won the bronze medal. At the 2016 Olympics he won a bronze medal.

== Freestyle results ==
World Championships/Olympic Games Matches
Res.	Record	Opponent	Score	Date	Event	Location	Notes
Win	25–6	(Cuba) Yowlys Bonne Rodriguez	9–0	2016-08-19	Olympic Games	(Brazil) Rio de Janeiro	Wins Bronze Medal
Loss	24–6	(Japan) Rei Higuchi	5–10	2016-08-19	Olympic Games	(Brazil) Rio de Janeiro	
Win	24–5	(Russia) Viktor Lebedev	6–1	2016-08-19	Olympic Games	(Brazil) Rio de Janeiro	
Win	23–5	(Armenia) Garnik Mnatsakanyan	13–0	2016-08-19	Olympic Games	(Brazil) Rio de Janeiro	
Loss	22–5	(Georgia (country)) Vladimer Khinchegashvili	4–5	2015-09-10	World Championship	(United States) Las Vegas	Gold Medal Match
Win	22–4	(Russia) Viktor Lebedev	5–0	2015-09-10	World Championship	(United States) Las Vegas	
Win	21–4	(North Korea) Hak-Jin Jong	5–3	2015-09-10	World Championship	(United States) Las Vegas	
Win	20–4	(United States) Anthony Ramos	3–1	2015-09-10	World Championship	(United States) Las Vegas	
Win	19–4	(Belarus) Asadulla Lachinau	7–0	2015-09-10	World Championship	(United States) Las Vegas	
Win	18–4	(Venezuela) Pedro Jesus Mejias Rodriguez	4–3	2015-09-10	World Championship	(United States) Las Vegas	
Win	17–4	(Japan) Yuki Takahashi	7–4	2014-09-08	World Championship	(Uzbekistan) Tashkent	Wins Bronze Medal
Loss	16–4	(North Korea) Kyong-Il Yang	4–5	2014-09-08	World Championship	(Uzbekistan) Tashkent	
Win	16–3	(Russia) Viktor Lebedev	7–0	2014-09-08	World Championship	(Uzbekistan) Tashkent	
Win	15–3	(Ukraine) Mykola Aivazian	10–2	2014-09-08	World Championship	(Uzbekistan) Tashkent	
Win	14–3	(Spain) Levan Metreveli Vartanov	5–0	2014-09-08	World Championship	(Uzbekistan) Tashkent	57 kg
Win	13–3	(India) Amit Kumar	2–1	2013-09-16	World Championship	(Hungary) Budapest	Wins Gold Medal
Win	12–3	(Russia) Nariman Israpilov	9–0	2013-09-16	World Championship	(Hungary) Budapest	
Win	11–3	(Kyrgyzstan) Altinbek Alimbaev	7–0	2013-09-16	World Championship	(Hungary) Budapest	
Win	10–3	(South Korea) Sung-Gwon Kim	9–2	2013-09-16	World Championship	(Hungary) Budapest	
Win	9–3	(Kazakhstan) Rasul Kaliev	7–0	2013-09-16	World Championship	(Hungary) Budapest	
Loss	8–3	(India) Amit Kumar	2–2	2012-08-10	Olympic Games	(United Kingdom) London	
Win	8–2	(Mongolia) Bayaraa Naranbaatar	5–0	2012-08-10	Olympic Games	(United Kingdom) London	
Win	7–2	(United States) Nicholas Simmons	5–0	2011-09-16	World Championship	(Turkey) Istanbul	Wins Bronze Medal
Win	6–2	(Georgia (country)) Vladimer Khinchegashvili	9–2	2011-09-16	World Championship	(Turkey) Istanbul	
Win	5–2	(Belarus) Vladislav Andreev	3–0	2011-09-16	World Championship	(Turkey) Istanbul	
Loss	4–2	(Bulgaria) Radoslav Velikov	9–1	2011-09-16	World Championship	(Turkey) Istanbul	
Win	4–1	(North Korea) Kyong-Il Yang	3–2	2011-09-16	World Championship	(Turkey) Istanbul	
Win	3–1	(Romania) Andrei Dukov	4–0	2011-09-16	World Championship	(Turkey) Istanbul	
Loss	2–1	(Cuba) Frank Chamizo Marquez	0–3	2010-09-10	World Championship	(Russia) Moscow	
Win	2–0	(Georgia (country)) Besarion Gochashvili	3–1	2010-09-10	World Championship	(Russia) Moscow	
Win	1–0	(Poland) Adrian Hajduk	2–0	2010-09-10	World Championship	(Russia) Moscow	55 kg
