= Wrestling at the 2016 Summer Olympics – Men's freestyle 57 kg =

Men's freestyle 57 kg at the Games of the XXXI Olympiad
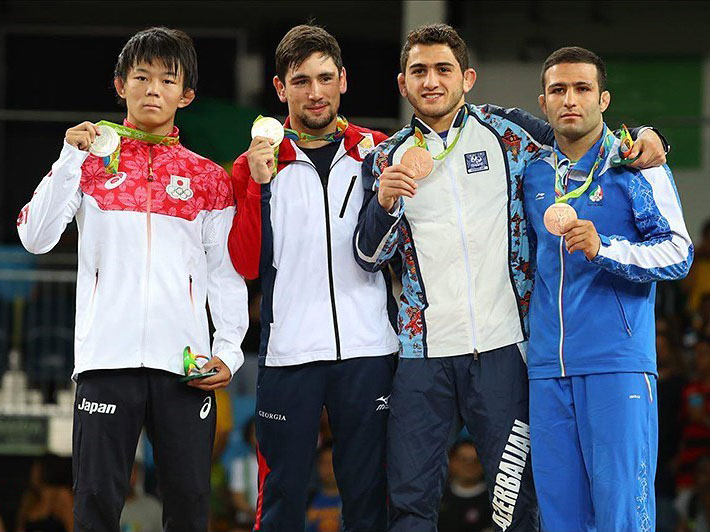
- Medalists
- Venue: Carioca Arena 2
- Date: 19 August 2016
- Competitors: 20 from 20 nations

Medalists
1st place, gold medalist(s)		Vladimer Khinchegashvili	Georgia
2nd place, silver medalist(s)		Rei Higuchi	Japan
3rd place, bronze medalist(s)		Haji Aliyev	Azerbaijan
3rd place, bronze medalist(s)		Hassan Rahimi	Iran

Men's freestyle 57 kilograms competition at the 2016 Summer Olympics in Rio de Janeiro, Brazil, took place on August 19 at the Carioca Arena 2 in Barra da Tijuca.

This freestyle wrestling competition consists of a single-elimination tournament, with a repechage used to determine the winner of two bronze medals. The two finalists face off for gold and silver medals. Each wrestler who loses to one of the two finalists moves into the repechage, culminating in a pair of bronze medal matches featuring the semifinal losers each facing the remaining repechage opponent from their half of the bracket.

Each bout consists of a single round within a six-minute limit. The wrestler who scores more points is the winner.

== Schedule ==
All times are Brasília Standard Time (UTC−03:00)

Date	Time	Event
19 August 2016	10:00	Qualification rounds
19 August 2016	16:00	Repechage
19 August 2016	17:00	Finals

== Results ==
Legend

- F — Won by fall

=== Final ===
Final
Vladimer Khinchegashvili (GEO)	4
Rei Higuchi (JPN)	3

=== Top half ===
Qualifications

1/8 finals
Vladimer Khinchegashvili (GEO)	4
Nurislam Sanayev (KAZ)	3
Haji Aliyev (AZE)	12
Yun Jun-sik (KOR)	2
Vladimir Dubov (BUL)	11
Daniel Dennis (USA)	0
Süleyman Atlı (TUR)	3
Ivan Guidea (ROU)	8

1/4 finals
Vladimer Khinchegashvili (GEO)	5
Haji Aliyev (AZE)	3
Vladimir Dubov (BUL)	10^{F}
Ivan Guidea (ROU)	0

Semifinals
Vladimer Khinchegashvili (GEO)	8
Vladimir Dubov (BUL)	4

=== Bottom half ===
Qualifications
Chakir Ansari (MAR)	4
Asadulla Lachinau (BLR)	14
Rei Higuchi (JPN)	12
Yang Kyong-il (PRK)	2
Yowlys Bonne (CUB)	10
Abbos Rakhmonov (UZB)	0
Adama Diatta (SEN)	3
Erdenebatyn Bekhbayar (MGL)	3

1/8 finals
Hassan Rahimi (IRI)	13
Garnik Mnatsakanyan (ARM)	0
Viktor Lebedev (RUS)	7
Sandeep Tomar (IND)	3
Asadulla Lachinau (BLR)	0
Rei Higuchi (JPN)	10
Yowlys Bonne (CUB)	7
Adama Diatta (SEN)	4

1/4 finals
Hassan Rahimi (IRI)	6
Viktor Lebedev (RUS)	1
Rei Higuchi (JPN)	8
Yowlys Bonne (CUB)	4

Semifinals
Hassan Rahimi (IRI)	5
Rei Higuchi (JPN)	10

=== Repechage ===
Repechage round 1
Yang Kyong-il (PRK)	6
Asadulla Lachinau (BLR)	2

Repechage round 2
Nurislam Sanayev (KAZ)	8
Haji Aliyev (AZE)	10
Yang Kyong-il (PRK)	1
Yowlys Bonne (CUB)	11

Bronze medals
Haji Aliyev (AZE)	5^{F}
Vladimir Dubov (BUL)	4
Yowlys Bonne (CUB)	0
Hassan Rahimi (IRI)	9^{F}

== Final standing ==
Rank	Athlete
1st place, gold medalist(s)	Vladimer Khinchegashvili (GEO)
2nd place, silver medalist(s)	Rei Higuchi (JPN)
3rd place, bronze medalist(s)	Haji Aliyev (AZE)
3rd place, bronze medalist(s)	Hassan Rahimi (IRI)
5	Vladimir Dubov (BUL)
5	Yowlys Bonne (CUB)
7	Asadulla Lachinau (BLR)
8	Yang Kyong-il (PRK)
9	Viktor Lebedev (RUS)
10	Adama Diatta (SEN)
11	Ivan Guidea (ROU)
12	Nurislam Sanayev (KAZ)
13	Chakir Ansari (MAR)
14	Erdenebatyn Bekhbayar (MGL)
15	Sandeep Tomar (IND)
16	Süleyman Atlı (TUR)
17	Yun Jun-sik (KOR)
18	Abbos Rakhmonov (UZB)
19	Daniel Dennis (USA)
20	Garnik Mnatsakanyan (ARM)
