= Azatashen =

Azatashen Ազատաշեն
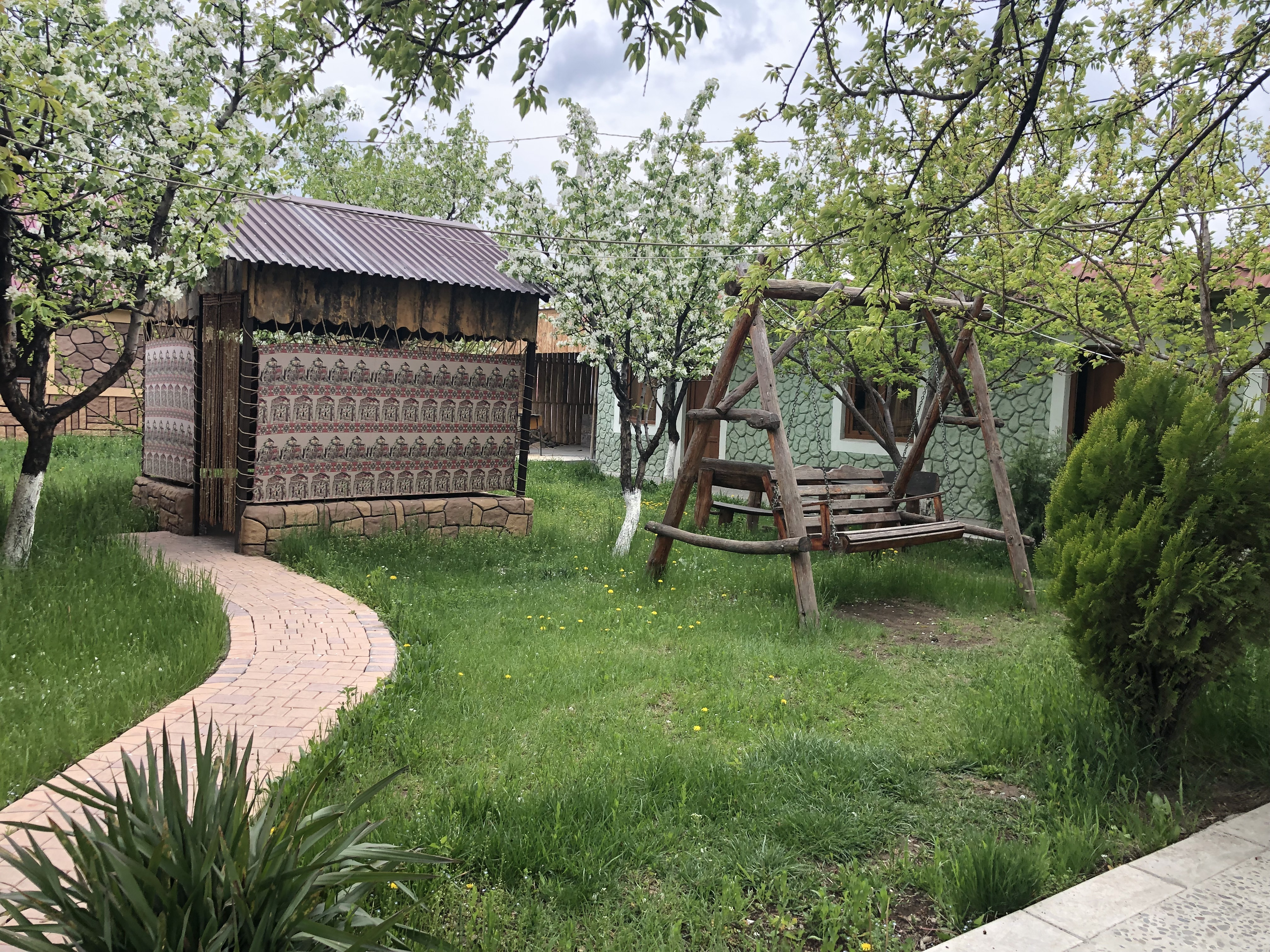
- A garden restaurant area in Azatashen

- Location within Armenia Location within Ararat
- Coordinates: 40°08′06″N 44°24′54″E
- Country: Armenia
- Province: Ararat
- Municipality: Masis

Population (2011)
  - Total: 732
- Time zone: UTC+4
  - Summer (DST): UTC+5

Azatashen (Armenian: Ազատաշեն) is a village in the Masis Municipality of the Ararat Province of Armenia.

== Notable people ==
- Garnik Mnatsakanyan, is an Armenian Freestyle wrestler.
