= 2010 Yasar Dogu Tournament =

Yasar Dogu 2010
- Host city: Istanbul, Turkey
- Dates: 12–14 February
- Stadium: Ahmet Comert Sports Complex

The Yasar Dogu Tournament 2010, was a wrestling event held in Istanbul, Turkey between 12 and 14 February 2010. This tournament was held as 38th.

This international tournament includes competition includes competition in both men's and women's freestyle wrestling. This ranking tournament was held in honor of the two time Olympic Champion, Yaşar Doğu.

== Medal table ==
Rank	Nation	Gold	Silver	Bronze	Total
1	Azerbaijan	4	2	1	7
2	Russia	1	2	0	3
3	Iran	1	1	3	5
4	Canada	1	0	0	1
5	Turkey	0	1	6	7
6	Mongolia	0	1	1	2
7	Georgia	0	0	1	1
7	Kazakhstan	0	0	1	1
7	Ukraine	0	0	1	1
Totals (9 entries)		7	7	14	28

== Medal overview ==
=== Men's freestyle ===
Event	Gold	Silver	Bronze
55 kg	Mahmud Magamedov; Azerbaijan	Bayaraagiin Naranbaatar; Mongolia	Youri Ledenov; Ukraine
55 kg	Mahmud Magamedov; Azerbaijan	Bayaraagiin Naranbaatar; Mongolia	Faraz Bahrami; Iran
60 kg	Zelimkhan Huseynov; Azerbaijan	Sayef Ahmedizai; Iran	Tevfik Odabaşı; Turkey
60 kg	Zelimkhan Huseynov; Azerbaijan	Sayef Ahmedizai; Iran	Madalyava Gazoli; Mongolia
66 kg	Haislan Garcia; Canada	Emin Azizov; Azerbaijan	Mustafa Kuyucu; Turkey
66 kg	Haislan Garcia; Canada	Emin Azizov; Azerbaijan	Mostafa Hosseinkhani; Iran
74 kg	Aniuar Geduev; Russia	Kamal Malikov; Russia	Chamsulvara Chamsulvaraev; Azerbaijan
74 kg	Aniuar Geduev; Russia	Kamal Malikov; Russia	Saeid Riahi; Iran
84 kg	Nauruz Temrezov; Azerbaijan	Albert Saritov; Russia	Serdar Böke; Turkey
84 kg	Nauruz Temrezov; Azerbaijan	Albert Saritov; Russia	Erhan Cihangiroğlu; Turkey
96 kg	Khetag Gazyumov; Azerbaijan	Serhat Balcı; Turkey	Davit Kezeraşvili; Georgia
96 kg	Khetag Gazyumov; Azerbaijan	Serhat Balcı; Turkey	Salih Erinç; Turkey
120 kg	Muhammad Azarshakip; Iran	Tohtar Temresov; Azerbaijan	Ali Gürbüz; Turkey
120 kg	Muhammad Azarshakip; Iran	Tohtar Temresov; Azerbaijan	Nursan Katayev; Kazakhstan

== Participating nations ==
- Azerbaijan
- Canada
- Iran
- Kazakhstan
- Kyrgyzstan
- Macedonia
- Mongolia
- Russia
- Slovakia
- Tajikistan
- Turkey
- Turkmenistan
- Georgia
