= 2014 European Wrestling Championships – Men's freestyle 61 kg =

Wrestling competitions

The men's freestyle 61 kg is a competition featured at the 2014 European Wrestling Championships, and was held in Vantaa, Finland on April 2.

== Medalists ==
Gold	Haji Aliyev; Azerbaijan
Silver	Bekkhan Goygereyev; Russia
Bronze	Andrei Perpeliță; Moldova
Bronze	Vasyl Shuptar; Ukraine

== Results ==
Legend

- F — Won by fall

=== Main bracket ===
Round of 16
Aleksei Baskakov (EST)	0
Andrei Perpeliță (MDA)	10
Šarūnas Jurčys (LTU)	10
Jasin Redjalari (MKD)	13
Bekkhan Goygereyev (RUS)	16
Krzysztof Bieńkowski (POL)	3
Ronny Rännälä (FIN)	0
Vasyl Shuptar (UKR)	10
Surkho Rashitkhanov (BLR)	2
Münir Recep Aktaş (TUR)	8
Beka Lomtadze (GEO)	14
Narek Sanoyan (ARM)	9
Haji Aliyev (AZE)	14
Alexander Semisorow (GER)	4

Quarterfinals
Vladimir Dubov (BUL)	5
Andrei Perpeliță (MDA)	6
Jasin Redjalari (MKD)	1
Bekkhan Goygereyev (RUS)	12
Vasyl Shuptar (UKR)	3
Münir Recep Aktaş (TUR)	0
Beka Lomtadze (GEO)	6
Haji Aliyev (AZE)	12

Semifinals
Andrei Perpeliță (MDA)	4
Bekkhan Goygereyev (RUS)	8
Vasyl Shuptar (UKR)	7
Haji Aliyev (AZE)	9

Final
Bekkhan Goygereyev (RUS)	5
Haji Aliyev (AZE)	12

=== Repechage ===
Repechage round 1
Krzysztof Bieńkowski (POL)	13
Jasin Redjalari (MKD)	2
Alexander Semisorow (GER)	15
Beka Lomtadze (GEO)	4

Bronze medals
Krzysztof Bieńkowski (POL)	3
Andrei Perpeliță (MDA)	6
Alexander Semisorow (GER)	5
Vasyl Shuptar (UKR)	12
