= 2006 Yasar Dogu Tournament =

Yasar Dogu 2006
- Host city: Samsun, Turkey
- Dates: 11–12 February

The Yasar Dogu Tournament 2006, was a wrestling event held in Samsun, Turkey between 3 and 4 February 2006. This tournament was held as 34th.

This international tournament includes competition includes competition in men's freestyle wrestling. This ranking tournament was held in honor of the two time Olympic Champion, Yaşar Doğu.

== Medal table ==
Rank	Nation	Gold	Silver	Bronze	Total
1	Cuba	3	2	1	6
2	Turkey	2	3	9	14
3	United States	1	2	2	5
4	Azerbaijan	1	0	0	1
5	Mongolia	0	0	2	2
Totals (5 entries)		7	7	14	28

== Medal overview ==
=== Men's freestyle ===
Event	Gold	Silver	Bronze
55 kg	René Montero; Cuba	Sammie Henson; United States	Bayaraagiin Naranbaatar; Mongolia
55 kg	René Montero; Cuba	Sammie Henson; United States	Ramazan Demir; Turkey
60 kg	Tevfik Odabaşı; Turkey	Yandro Quintana; Cuba	Arif Kama; Turkey
60 kg	Tevfik Odabaşı; Turkey	Yandro Quintana; Cuba	Şükrü Göçer; Turkey
66 kg	Elman Asgarov; Azerbaijan	Ayetullah Yeşil; Turkey	Mustafa Kuyucu; Turkey
66 kg	Elman Asgarov; Azerbaijan	Ayetullah Yeşil; Turkey	Mark Cristopher; United States
74 kg	Iván Fundora; Cuba	Joe Williams; United States	Fahrettin Özata; Turkey
74 kg	Iván Fundora; Cuba	Joe Williams; United States	Hakkı Ceylan; Turkey
84 kg	Muhammed Lawal; United States	Serhat Balcı; Turkey	Gökhan Yavaşer; Turkey
84 kg	Muhammed Lawal; United States	Serhat Balcı; Turkey	Roylandy Herrera; Cuba
96 kg	Michel Batista; Cuba	Hakan Koç; Turkey	Enk Angalan; Mongolia
96 kg	Michel Batista; Cuba	Hakan Koç; Turkey	Sait Bingöl; Turkey
120 kg	Ali Rıza Kaya; Turkey	Alexandre Montero; Cuba	Şaban Yılmaz; Turkey
120 kg	Ali Rıza Kaya; Turkey	Alexandre Montero; Cuba	Tolly Thomson; United States

== Participating nations ==
- Turkey
- Azerbaijan
- Bulgaria
- Cuba
- Mongolia
- Russia
- United States
