= 2017 European Wrestling Championships – Men's freestyle 61 kg =

The men's freestyle 61 kg is a competition featured at the 2017 European Wrestling Championships, and was held in Novi Sad, Serbia on May 4.

== Medalists ==
Gold	Vladimer Khinchegashvili; Georgia
Silver	Akhmed Chakaev; Russia
Bronze	Valodya Frangulyan; Armenia
Bronze	Andrei Prepeliță; Moldova

== Results ==
Legend

- F — Won by fall

=== Final ===
Final
Akhmed Chakaev (RUS)	9
Vladimer Khinchegashvili (GEO)	10

=== Top half ===
==== Section 1 ====
Round of 32

Round of 16
Mykola Bolotnjuk (SVK)	4
Valodya Frangulyan (ARM)	5
Stefan Taricic (SRB)	0
Dimitar Ivanov (BUL)	10
Akhmed Chakaev (RUS)	10
Manuel Wolfer (GER)	0
Heorhi Kaliyeu (BLR)	2
Abdi Zurnacı (TUR)	4

Quarterfinals
Valodya Frangulyan (ARM)	13
Dimitar Ivanov (BUL)	2
Akhmed Chakaev (RUS)	7
Abdi Zurnacı (TUR)	0

Semifinals
Valodya Frangulyan (ARM)	1
Akhmed Chakaev (RUS)	11

=== Bottom half ===
Round of 32
Randy Vock (SUI)	0
Andrei Prepeliță (MDA)	10

Round of 16
David Dobre (ROU)	2
Petro Bileichuk (UKR)	6
Iurii Siemakin (FRA)	11
Elmedin Sejfulau (MKD)	0
József Molnár (HUN)	2
Akhmednabi Gvarzatilov (AZE)	10
Vladimer Khinchegashvili (GEO)	5
Andrei Prepeliță (MDA)	1

Quarterfinals
Petro Bileichuk (UKR)	12
Iurii Siemakin (FRA)	8
Akhmednabi Gvarzatilov (AZE)	5
Vladimer Khinchegashvili (GEO)	9

Semifinals
Petro Bileichuk (UKR)	2
Vladimer Khinchegashvili (GEO)	8

=== Repechage ===
Repechage round 2
Manuel Wolfer (GER)	0
Abdi Zurnacı (TUR)	3
Andrei Prepeliță (MDA)	12
Akhmednabi Gvarzatilov (AZE)	10

Bronze medals
Abdi Zurnacı (TUR)	0
Valodya Frangulyan (ARM)	10
Andrei Prepeliță (MDA)	10
Petro Bileichuk (UKR)	10
