= 2016 European Wrestling Championships – Men's freestyle 61 kg =

The men's freestyle 61 kg is a competition featured at the 2016 European Wrestling Championships, and was held in Riga, Latvia on March 10.

== Medalists ==
Gold	Vladimer Khinchegashvili; Georgia
Silver	Heorhi Kaliyeu; Belarus
Bronze	Ivan Guidea; Romania
Bronze	Haji Aliyev; Azerbaijan

== Results ==
Legend

- F — Won by fall

=== Top half ===
==== Section 1 ====
Round of 16
Ivan Guidea (ROM)	1
Heorhi Kaliyeu (BLR)	4
Sarunas Jurcys (LTU)	0
Haji Aliyev (AZE)	11
Krzysztof Bieńkowski (POL)	0
Vladimir Dubov (BUL)	11
Vladimer Khinchegashvili (GEO)	10
Jasin Redjalari (MKD)	0
Valodya Frangulyan (ARM)	10
Mihai Esanu (MDA)	0

Quarterfinals
Nurgun Skryabin (RUS)	8
Petro Beleichuk (UKR)	9
Münir Recep Aktaş (TUR)	3
Heorhi Kaliyeu (BLR)	4
Haji Aliyev (AZE)	11
Vladimir Dubov (BUL)	0
Vladimer Khinchegashvili (GEO)	5
Valodya Frangulyan (ARM)	0

Semifinals
Petro Beleichuk (UKR)	2
Heorhi Kaliyeu (BLR)	6
Haji Aliyev (AZE)	2
Vladimer Khinchegashvili (GEO)	4

Final
Heorhi Kaliyeu (BLR)	1
Vladimer Khinchegashvili (GEO)	6

=== Repechage ===
Repechage round 2
Ivan Guidea (ROM)	3
Münir Recep Aktaş (TUR)	2
Jasin Redjalari (MKD)	8
Valodya Frangulyan (ARM)	17

Bronze medals
Ivan Guidea (ROM)	11
Petro Beleichuk (UKR)	1
Valodya Frangulyan (ARM)	0
Haji Aliyev (AZE)	7
