= Yang Kyong-il =

North Korean wrestler (born 1989)

Yang Kyong-Il
Personal information
- Native name: 양경일
- Nationality: North Korea
- Born: 7 August 1989 (age 36) Pyongyang, North Korea
- Height: 157 cm (5 ft 2 in)

Korean name
- Hangul: 양경일
- RR: Yang Gyeongil
- MR: Yang Kyŏngil

Sport
- Country: North Korea
- Weight class: 55–57 kg
- Club: Ryongnamsan Sports Club (Kim Il Sung University)
- Coached by: Ri Myong Hak
Medal record
Men's freestyle wrestling
Representing North Korea
Olympic Games
Bronze medal – third place	2012 London	55 kg
World Championships
Gold medal – first place	2009 Herning	55 kg
Gold medal – first place	2014 Tashkent	57 kg
Asian Games
Silver medal – second place	2010 Guangzhou	55 kg
Asian Championships
Gold medal – first place	2011 Tashkent	55 kg
Silver medal – second place	2009 Pattaya	55 kg
Silver medal – second place	2013 New Delhi	55 kg
Bronze medal – third place	2010 New Delhi	55 kg

Yang Kyong-Il (Korean pronunciation: [jaŋ.ɡjʌŋ.il] or [jaŋ] [kjʌŋ.il]; born 7 August 1989 in Pyongyang) is a male freestyle wrestler from North Korea who is a double world champion and won a bronze medal at the 2012 Summer Olympics.

== Career ==
Yang won his first world title at the 2009 World Championships. He beat Bayaraagiin Naranbaatar, Krasimir Krastanov, Mykola Aivazian and Rizvan Gadzhiev before beating Sezar Akgül in the final.

He participated in Men's freestyle 55 kg at 2008 Summer Olympics. He lost in the last 16 to Namig Sevdimov and was eliminated from the competition.

At the 2012 Summer Olympics, Yang beat Dilshod Mansurov before losing to Dzhamal Otarsultanov. Because Otarsultanov reached the final, Yang was entered into the repechage. In the repechage, Yang beat Sem Shilimela before beating Daulet Niyazbekov to win a bronze medal.

In 2014, Yang won his second world title in Tashkent. He beat Kim Sung-gwon, Yuki Takahashi and Hassan Rahimi before beatingVladimer Khinchegashvili in the final.

At the 2016 Olympics, Yang lost to Rei Higuchi in the first round. Because Higuchi reached the final, Yang was entered into the repechage. In the repechage, Yang beat Asadulla Lachinau before losing to Yowlys Bonne to leave without a medal.
