= Nick Simmons (wrestler) =

American wrestler (born 1982)

Personal information
- Born: October 25, 1982 (age 43) Clear Lake, Texas, U.S.
- Home town: Williamston, Michigan, U.S.

Sport
- Country: United States
- Sport: Wrestling
- Events: Freestyle and Folkstyle
- College team: Michigan State
- Club: Sunkist Kids Wrestling Club
- Team: USA
Medal record
Men's freestyle wrestling
Representing United States
Pan American Championships
Gold medal – first place	2004 Guatemala City	55 kg
Men's collegiate wrestling
Representing the Michigan State Spartans
NCAA Division I Championships
Bronze medal – third place	2007 Auburn Hills	133 lb
Big Ten Championships
Gold medal – first place	2005 Iowa City	125 lb
Gold medal – first place	2006 Bloomington	125 lb
Gold medal – first place	2007 East Lansing	133 lb
Bronze medal – third place	2003 Madison	125 lb

Nick Simmons (born October 25, 1982) is an American former wrestler, who represented the United States at the 2011 World Wrestling Championships. Simmons was known as the "East Lansing Strangler" for his ability to pin at a high rate, partially due to his above-average height for a wrestler at his weight.

== High school ==
Simmons attended Williamston High School in Williamston, Michigan from 1998 to 2001. Simmons was one of the most successful high school wrestlers in Michigan history, finishing his prep career 211-0 with 178 pins, including 54 consecutive pins in his sophomore year. His performance in 1999 earned him the Junior Schalles Award for top high school pinner. Williamston also won team state championships in Simmons' sophomore and junior years.

== College ==
At Michigan State University, Simmons was a four-time NCAA Division I All-American and three-time Big Ten Champion. At the NCAA Tournament he finishing third in 2007, fourth in both 2006 & 2005, and seventh in 2003. Simmons was second all-time in wins at Michigan State, with 138 wins, and first all-time in pins, with 46.

== International ==
Simmons took an Olympic redshirt during the 2003–2004 school year, winning the Pan American Championships. In 2005, Simmons competed in the University World Games, finishing in 5th place after losing in the bronze medal match. Simmons continued to make U.S. National Teams (top 3 at the World Team Trials) for most of the next decade, including making the U.S. Freestyle World Team in 2011. At the 2011 World Wrestling Championships, Simmons took 5th place, going 4-2, with losses to eventual silver medalist Radoslav Velikov and bronze medalist Hassan Rahimi. Simmons competed for but failed to qualify for the 2012 Olympics, placing second at the U.S. Olympic Team trials.
