= Reece Humphrey =

American freestyle wrestler (born 1986)

Personal information
- Full name: Reece Weslee Humphrey
- Born: July 31, 1986 (age 40) Bloomington, Indiana, U.S.
- Height: 5 ft 7 in (170 cm)
- Weight: 61 kg (134 lb); 65 kg (143 lb)

Sport
- Country: United States
- Sport: Wrestling
- Events: Freestyle and Folkstyle
- College team: Ohio State
- Club: New York AC; Shamil Umakhanov Wrestling Club (им. Шамиля Умаханова)
- Coached by: Lou Rosselli
Medal record
Men's freestyle wrestling
Representing United States
US Open National Championships
Gold medal – first place	2011 Cleveland	60 kg
Gold medal – first place	2013 Las Vegas	60 kg
Gold medal – first place	2015 Las Vegas	61 kg
Granma y Cerro Pelado International
Silver medal – second place	2015 Havana	65 kg
Grand Prix of Paris
Bronze medal – third place	2014 Paris	65 kg
Ukrainian International Memorial
Bronze medal – third place	2016 Kiev	65 kg
Dave Schultz Memorial International
Silver medal – second place	2015 Colorado Springs	65 kg
Bronze medal – third place	2013 Colorado Springs	60 kg
New York Athletic Club International
Gold medal – first place	2011 New York	60 kg
Silver medal – second place	2012 New York	60 kg
Men's collegiate wrestling
Representing the Ohio State Buckeyes
NCAA Division I Championships
Silver medal – second place	2009 St. Louis	133 lb
Bronze medal – third place	2010 Omaha	141 lb

Reece Weslee Humphrey (born July 31, 1986, in Bloomington, Indiana) is an American former freestyle wrestler who competed for the men's freestyle 60 kg at the World Wrestling Championships 2013 in Budapest, Hungary. He was eliminated in the quarterfinal rounds, after being defeated by Iran's Masoud Esmaeilpour, based on the decision score 9–8. He is a 3x national USA wrestling champion in 2011, 2013 and 2015. New York Athletic Club International Open champion 2011. Humphrey is also an Indiana high school state champion, a Freestyle and Greco-Roman national champion, and 2x All-American out of the Ohio State University (2009 runner-up and 2010 3rd place). At the 2015 World Championships he beat world bronze medalist Daulet Niyazbekov of Kazakhstan, but lost in the second round to Mongolia's Batboldyn Nomin, Batboldyn reached the final, Humphrey then lost to bronze world medalist Bajrang Punia of India in the first round of repechage.

== Championships and accomplishments ==
- Folkstyle:
  - 2009 NCAA championships out of Ohio State – 2nd.
  - 2010 NCAA championships out of Ohio State – 3rd.
- Freestyle:
  - 2010 New York athletic club International open – 4th.
  - 2011 Dave Schultz Memorial International – 5th.
  - 2011 New York athletic club International open – 1st.
  - 2011 USA World Team Trials Champion.
  - 2011 World Wrestling Championships 9th – 60 kg (Istanbul, Turkey)
  - 2011 Ukrainian Wrestlers Memorial International 5th – 60 kg (Kiev, Ukraine)
  - 2012 New York athletic club International open 2nd – 60 kg
  - 2012 Ramzan Kadyrov & Adlan Varayev Cup 5th – 60 kg (Grozny, Chechnya)
  - 2013 USA National Freestyle Wrestling champion – 60 kg
  - 2013 USA World Team Trials champion – 60 kg
  - 2013 World Wrestling Championships 8th – 60 kg (Budapest, Hungary)
  - 2014 USA Freestyle Wrestling Championships 5th – 60 kg
  - 2014 USA World Team Trials 4th – 61 kg
  - 2014 Grand Prix of Paris – 3rd – 61 kg (Paris, France)
  - 2015 USA National Freestyle Wrestling champion – 61 kg
  - 2015 USA World Team Trials champion – 61 kg
  - 2015 Granma y Cerro Pelado International 2nd – 61 kg (Havana, Cuba)
  - 2015 Dave Schultz Memorial International 2nd – 61 kg
  - 2015 World Wrestling Championships 12th – 61 kg
  - 2016 Ukrainian Wrestlers and Coaches Memorial 3rd – 65 kg
