= Rassul Kaliyev =

Kazakhstani freestyle wrestler

Personal information
- Nationality: Kazakh
- Born: 16 June 1991 (age 35) Kalbatau, Abai Region, Kazakhstan

Sport
- Sport: Sport wrestling
- Event: Freestyle
Medal record
Asian Games
Silver medal – second place	2014 Incheon	57 kg
Asian Championships
Gold medal – first place	2014 Almaty	57 kg
Silver medal – second place	2013 New Delhi	55 kg
World Junior Championships
Silver medal – second place	2011 Bucharest	55 kg

Rassul Kaliyev (born 16 June 1991) is a freestyle wrestler from Kazakhstan. In Incheon, South Korea, he won the silver medal in the men's freestyle 57 kg category, after losing to Jong Hak-jin of North Korea in the 2014 Asian Games. He also won the silver medal in the Ali Aliyev International Freestyle Wrestling Tournament, held in Makhachkala.
