= Kim Jin-cheol =

South Korean freestyle wrestler

Kim Jin-Cheol (born 7 August 1989 in Gangwon Province) is a South Korean freestyle wrestler. He competed in the freestyle 55 kg event at the 2012 Summer Olympics and was defeated by Shinichi Yumoto in the 1/8 finals.
