= Yasuhiro Inaba =

Japanese freestyle wrestler

Personal information
- Nationality: Japan
- Born: 稲葉 泰弘; 21 October 1985 (age 40) Joso, Ibaraki, Japan
- Height: 162 cm (5 ft 4 in)

Sport
- Country: Japan
- Sport: Wrestling
- Weight class: 55 kg
- Event: Freestyle

Achievements and titles
- World finals: (bronze) (2010)
- Regional finals: (bronze) (2010) (silver) (2011) (silver) (2012)
Medal record
Men's freestyle wrestling
Representing Japan
World Championships
Bronze medal – third place	2010 Moscow	55 kg
World Cup
Silver medal – second place	2012 Baku	55 kg
Asian Games
Bronze medal – third place	2010 Guangzhou	55 kg
Asian Championships
Silver medal – second place	2012 Gumi	55 kg
Silver medal – second place	2011 Tashkent	55 kg
World University Championships
Gold medal – first place	2008 Thessaloniki	55 kg

Yasuhiro Inaba (稲葉 泰弘, Inaba Yasuhiro; born October 21, 1985) is a male freestyle wrestler from Japan.
