= Garnik Mnatsakanyan =

Armenian freestyle wrestler

Garnik Mnatsakanyan Գառնիկ Մնացականյան
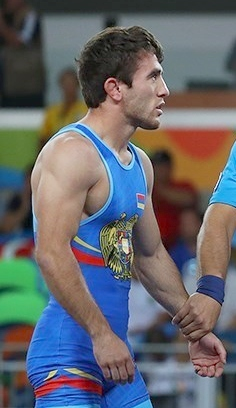
- Mnatsakanyan at the 2016 Olympics

Personal information
- Born: 7 November 1989 (age 36) Azatashen, Armenia
- Height: 1.61 m (5 ft 3 1/2 in)
- Weight: 57 kg (126 lb)

Sport
- Sport: Wrestling
- Event: Freestyle
- Club: Tashir
- Coached by: Arshak Hayrapetyan; Gevorg Vardanyan; Aram Margaryan

Garnik Mnatsakanyan (Armenian: Գառնիկ Մնացականյան, born 7 November 1989) is an Armenian freestyle wrestler. He competed in the 57 kg division at the 2016 Olympics, but was eliminated in the first bout.

== Biography ==
He was born on 7 November 1989 in the Azatashen village. Mnatsakanyan first practiced taekwondo and then boxing before he began wrestling at the age of 10. His coaches are Arshak Hayrapetyan and Gevorg Vardanyan, and his first coach was Andranik Haroyan. Making his senior wrestling debut in 2010, Mnatsakanyan came in third at the 2016 Stepan Sargsyan Tournament and later competed at the 2016 Summer Olympics in London.

== Personal life ==
Mnatsakanyan is married and has one son. He liked to read books, has a calm temperament, and does not like talking much. His younger brother, Tigran Mnatsakanyan, also a freestyle wrestler.
