= Sem Shilimela =

Namibian freestyle wrestler

Naatele Sem Shilimela (born 30 July 1991 in Etayi) is a Namibian wrestler. He competed in the -55 kg event at the 2012 Summer Olympics.

== Major results ==
Year	Tournament	Venue	Result	Event
2010	African Championships	Cairo, Egypt	4th	Freestyle 60 kg
2010	African Championships	Cairo, Egypt	6th	Greco-Roman 55 kg
2011	African Championships	Dakar, Senegal	8th	Freestyle 55 kg
2011	World Championships	Istanbul, Turkey	21st	Freestyle 55 kg
2012	African Championships	Marrakesh, Morocco	3rd	Freestyle 55 kg
2012	Olympic Games	London, United Kingdom	15th	Freestyle 55 kg
2014	African Championships	Tunis, Tunisia	8th	Freestyle 61 kg
2014	World Championships	Tashkent, Uzbekistan	22nd	Freestyle 57 kg
2015	World Championships	Las Vegas, United States	30th	Freestyle 57 kg
2016	African Championships	Alexandria, Egypt	3rd	Freestyle 61 kg
