= Amit Kumar Dahiya =

Indian wrestler (born 1993)

Amit Kumar
Personal information
- Born: 15 December 1993 (age 32) Nahri, Haryana, India
Medal record
Men's freestyle wrestling
Representing India
World Championships
Silver medal – second place	2013 Budapest	55 kg
Commonwealth Games
Gold medal – first place	2014 Glasgow	57 kg
Asian Wrestling Championships
Bronze medal – third place	2012 Gumi	55 kg
Gold medal – first place	2013 New Delhi	55 kg
- Updated on 19 September 2015

Amit Kumar Dahiya (born 15 December 1993) is an Indian wrestler who represented India at the 2012 Summer Olympics in London, United Kingdom. He was the youngest wrestler ever to represent India at the Olympics while also being the youngest athlete of the 2012 Indian Olympic delegation.

In the recently concluded Pro Wrestling League's players' auction, he has been bought by Olive Global, a technology firm, and will be part of Haryana Hammers wrestling team.

== Life and family ==
Dahiya hails from Nahri village of Sonepat district, Haryana. He comes from a modest background with his father Narender Dahiya employed as a small-scale farmer.

Amit started wrestling in second grade at the age of seven, defeating a seventh grade student during a casual match in school. Seeing immense potential, his teachers and his family were encouraged to send him for proper training. He was admitted in the akhara of Hansrajji, at that time used only for recreation.

After seeing his talent, wrestling coach and former Asian and Commonwealth Games medallist Satpal Singh took him in his Delhi's wrestling training centre at Chhatrasal Stadium, Delhi.

== Career ==
=== 2012 Asian Wrestling Championships ===
In the opening round of the men's 55 kg freestyle category, Amit faced Ruslan Seksenbaev of Kazakhstan and beat him 3:0. In the next round, Amit's opponent was Yasuhiro Inaba of Japan, losing to him 0:5.

With the Japanese grappler reaching the final round, Amit was able to compete in the repechage round. In the first repechage round, his opponent was Alvin Lobriguito of the Philippines whom he beat 3:1 to qualify for the bronze medal bout. Amit was able to win the bronze medal, beating Altinbek Alimbaev of Kyrgyzstan 3:0.

=== 2013 World Wrestling Championships ===
In Budapest, Amit won the silver medal n the 55 kg category before losing to the Iranian Hassan Rahimi in the gold medal bout.

In the first round, Amit faced Yasuhiro Inaba of Japan, whom he lost to in the Asian Wrestling Championships the previous year but was able to exact revenge and beat him 4:1. His second round opponent was Zoheir Elquaraque of France whom he beat 4:0. In the quarter-finals, he was up against Angel Escobedo of the USA whom he overcame 4:0 easily. To qualify for the gold medal bout, he was up against Sezer Akguel of Turkey whom he was able to beat 4:0 easily.

=== 2013 Asian Wrestling Championships ===
In the tournament in New Delhi, Amit won the gold medal in the men's freestyle 55 kg category, beating Yang Kyong-il of South Korea by 1–0, 5–2 in the gold medal bout. After first round bye, he defeated Rassul Kaliyev of Kazakhstan in the quarter-finals, and Japanese grappler Fumitaka Morishita in the semi-finals.

=== 2014 Commonwealth Games ===
Amit won the gold medal in the men's freestyle 57 kg category, beating Ebikweminomo Welson of Nigeria with a thumping 6–2.

In the Round of 16, Amit faced Jean Guyliane Bandoo of Mauritius and won 5:0. His next opponent in the quarter-final round was Bokang Masunyane of South Africa whom he beat 4:0 comfortably. To qualify for the gold medal match, he faced Azhar Hussain from Pakistan in the semi-finals whom he beat easily 4:0.

=== 2014 Asian Games ===
Amit Kumar unfortunately couldn't repeat his Commonwealth Games feat. He crashed out of the tournament in the first round itself, losing 1:3 to Fumitaka Morishita of Japan.

== Awards ==
- Dave Schultz Memorial Tournament - Silver, 2014
- Arjuna Awarde
- Rajiv Gandhi Khel Ratan
- Bheem awarde
