= Bayaraagiin Naranbaatar =

Mongolian freestyle wrestler

Personal information
- Native name: Баяраа Наранбаатар
- Nationality: Mongolia
- Born: 11 March 1980 (age 46) Choibalsan, Dornod province, Mongolia
- Height: 162 cm (5 ft 4 in)

Sport
- Country: Mongolia
- Sport: Wrestling
- Weight class: 55 kg
- Event: Freestyle
- Coached by: Battulga Byambajav Bayaraa Byambarinchin

Achievements and titles
- World finals: (bronze) (2005) (silver) (2007) 5th(2010)
- Regional finals: (silver) (2004)
Medal record
Men's freestyle wrestling
Representing Mongolia
World Championships
| Silver medal – second place | 2007 Baku | 55 kg |
| Bronze medal – third place | 2005 Budapest | 55 kg |
World Cup
| Bronze medal – third place | 2002 Spokane | 55 kg |
Asian Championships
| Silver medal – second place | 2004 Tehran | 55 kg |
Asian Cup
| Bronze medal – third place | 2003 Almaty | 55 kg |
Olympic Qualification Tournament
| Gold medal – first place | 2012 Helsinki | 55 kg |
Summer Universiade
| Gold medal – first place | 2005 Izmir | 55 kg |
World University Championships
| Silver medal – second place | 2006 Ulaanbaatar | 55 kg |
Ali Aliyev Tournament
| Silver medal – second place | 2010 Kaspisk | 55 kg |
| Bronze medal – third place | 2007 Kaspisk | 55 kg |
Yasar Dogu Tournament
| Silver medal – second place | 2010 Istanbul | 55 kg |
| Bronze medal – third place | 2009 Ankara | 55 kg |
| Bronze medal – third place | 2007 Ankara | 55 kg |
| Bronze medal – third place | 2006 Samsun | 55 kg |
Dave Schultz Memorial International Tournament
| Gold medal – first place | 2008 Colorado Springs | 55 kg |
Grand Prix of Germany
| Gold medal – first place | 2008 Dortmund | 55 kg |
Open CSKA Cup
| Gold medal – first place | 2007 Moscow | 55 kg |

Bayaraagiin Naranbaatar (born 11 March 1980) is a male freestyle wrestler from Mongolia.

He was the winner of a Men's freestyle wrestling 55 kg at the 2005 Summer Universiade.

He participated in the Men's freestyle 55 kg at the 2004 Summer Olympics where he was ranked at twelfth place. Naraanbaatar beat Babak Nourzad from Iran, but lost to Korean Kim Hyo-Sub and was eliminated from competition.

He beat reigning Russian World, European and Grand Prix Ivan Yarygin's Champion Besik Kudukhov by a score 2–0, 4–0 at the Open CSKA Cup which was held 1 December 2007 in Moscow, Russia.

Naranbaatar won a gold medal at the 2008 Dave Schultz Memorial International which was held February 8–10, 2008, in Colorado Springs, Colorado, his final match against 2007 World Championships medalist Rizvan Gadzhiev from Belarus, which he took the 0–1, 1–0, 1–0 victory, was voted as one of the best matches of the tournament, and 2004 Olympic medalist Stephen Abas of USA finished third.

Naranbaatar won the gold medal at the 2008 Open Grand Prix of Germany which was held 20 June 2008 in Dortmund, Germany, by defeating reigning Asian Champion and 2008 Olympic silver medalist Tomohiro Matsunaga of Japan.

He participated in Men's freestyle 55 kg at the 2008 Summer Olympics. In 1/8th final he lost to Russian Besik Kudukhov by the score 0–1, 0–1.

Naranbaatar won the silver medal in the 2007 FILA Wrestling World Championships and bronze at the 2005 FILA Wrestling World Championships.

He won the 2012 Olympic Qualification Tournament which was held 4 Маy 2012 in Helsinki, Finland, including the matches against 2010 World Cup champion Vladislav Andreev оf Belarus with the score of 2–0, 1–0, and 2010 European champion Makhmud Magomedov оf Azerbaijan with the score of 0–1, 2–0, 4–1.

At the 2012 Summer Olympics, he lost in the second round to Hassan Rahimi from Iran.
