= Viktor Lebedev =

Russian freestyle wrestler

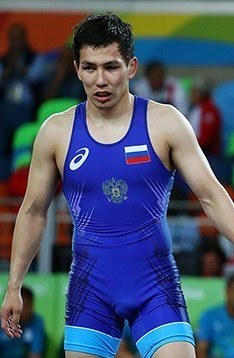

Personal information
- Full name: Viktor Nikolaevich Lebedev
- Nationality: (Russia) Russian
- Born: Виктор Николаевич Лебедев; 10 March 1988 (age 38) Tomponskiy Ulus, Yakut ASSR, Russian SFSR, Soviet Union
- Height: 1.65 m (5 ft 5 in)

Sport
- Country: Russia
- Sport: Wrestling
- Weight class: 57 kg
- Rank: Honored Master of Sports of Russia
- Event: Freestyle
- Club: CSKA Krasnoyarsk; Mindiashvili wrestling academy
- Coached by: Dmitry Mindiashvili

Achievements and titles
- Olympic finals: 9th(2016)
- World finals: (gold) (2010) (gold) (2011) (bronze) (2009) (bronze) (2015)
- Regional finals: (gold) (2015) (bronze) (2010)
- National finals: (gold) (2009) (gold) (2010) (gold) (2011) (gold) (2014) (gold) (2015) (gold) (2016) (silver) (2012)
Medal record
Men's freestyle wrestling
Representing Russia
World Championships
Gold medal – first place	2011 Istanbul	55 kg
Gold medal – first place	2010 Moscow	55 kg
Bronze medal – third place	2015 Las Vegas	57 kg
Bronze medal – third place	2009 Herning	55 kg
World Cup
Silver medal – second place	2014 Los Angeles	57 kg
European Games
Gold medal – first place	2015 Baku	57 kg
European Championships
Bronze medal – third place	2010 Baku	55 kg
Yasar Dogu Tournament
Bronze medal – third place	2015 Istanbul	61 kg
Representing (Sakha Republic) Sakha
Russian National Championships
Gold medal – first place	2016 Yakutsk	57 kg
Gold medal – first place	2015 Kaspiisk	57 kg
Gold medal – first place	2014 Yakutsk	57 kg
Gold medal – first place	2011 Yakutsk	55 kg
Gold medal – first place	2010 Volgograd	55 kg
Gold medal – first place	2009 Kazan	55 kg
Silver medal – second place	2012 St.Petersburg	55 kg
Golden Grand Prix Ivan Yarygin
Gold medal – first place	2015 Krasnoyarsk	57 kg
Silver medal – second place	2009 Krasnoyarsk	55 kg
Bronze medal – third place	2016 Krasnoyarsk	61 kg

Viktor Nikolaevich Lebedev (Russian: Виктор Николаевич Лебедев; born March 10, 1988, in Tomponskiy Ulus) is a Russian freestyle wrestler from the Sakha Republic, two time World Champion, multiple international tournaments winner. He won the gold medal at the 2015 Summer European Games in the Freestyle men's 57 kg weight category.

Lebedev competed out of the СSKA wrestling club in Krasnoyarsk, Russia. He is a three-time world medalist, including two title-winning performances in the 55 kg weight class at the 2010 and 2011 World Wrestling Championships. On 17 June 2015 he won the gold medal for wrestling in the 57 kilogram range at the 2015 European Games in Baku.

In October 2019, he was appointed Director General of Sakha Republic's state-owned fuel supply corporation, Sakhaneftegazsbyt (АО «Саханефтегазсбыт»).

On 19 December 2019, he caused physical harm to his deputy, Vladimir Strijak, breaking his nose and injuring various parts of his body. On 31 December 2019, he was officially charged with a crime by the regional court of Sakha Republic (Yakutia).

He is an ethnic Even.

== See also ==
- List of World and Olympic Champions in men's freestyle wrestling
- Soviet and Russian results in men's freestyle wrestling
