= Shin'ichi Yumoto =

Japanese wrestler (born 1984)

Shinichi Yumoto
Personal information
- Native name: 湯元進一
- Nationality: Japan
- Born: 4 December 1984 (age 41) Wakayama, Japan
- Height: 164 cm (5 ft 5 in)
- Weight: 63 kg (139 lb)

Sport
- Country: Japan
- Sport: Wrestling
- Weight class: 55 kg
- Event: Freestyle
- Club: Wrestling Club of Defense Forces;Saitama
- Coached by: Hironichi Ito

Achievements and titles
- Olympic finals: (bronze) (2012)
- World finals: 8th(2011)
- Regional finals: (gold) (2010)
Medal record
Men's freestyle wrestling
Representing Japan
Olympic Games
Bronze medal – third place	2012 London	55 kg
Asian Championships
Gold medal – first place	2010 New Delhi	55 kg
Golgen Grand Prix Ivan Yrygin
Bronze medal – third place	2011 Krasnoyarsk	55 kg

Shin'ichi Yumoto (湯元進一, Yumoto Shin'ichi) (born 4 December 1984 in Wakayama) is a Japanese freestyle wrestler. He competed in the 2009 World Wrestling Championships, reaching the round of 16. He competed in the 2011 World Wrestling Championships, reaching the quarterfinals. He competed in the 2012 Summer Olympics, winning a bronze medal. At the 2012 Summer Olympics, he lost to Vladimer Khinchegashvili in the semi-final. In the repechage, he defeated Radoslav Velikov in his bronze medal match.

Yumoto's twin brother Kenichi is also an Olympic medal winner in wrestling.
