= Ibrahim Farag =

Egyptian freestyle wrestler

Ibrahim Farag Abdelhakim Mohamed (born 5 February 1990 in Suez) is an Egyptian freestyle wrestler. He competed in the freestyle 55 kg event at the 2012 Summer Olympics; he was defeated by Vladimer Khinchegashvili in the qualification and eliminated by Radoslav Velikov in the first repechage round.
