= Kim Hyo-sub =

South Korean freestyle wrestler

Personal information
- Nationality: South Korea
- Born: 23 September 1980 (age 45) Hanam, South Korea
- Height: 1.58 m (5 ft 2 in)

Sport
- Country: South Korea
- Sport: Wrestling
- Weight class: 55 kg
- Event: Freestyle

Achievements and titles
- Olympic finals: 6th (2004) 9th (2008)
- World finals: 5th (2006) 5th (2010)
Medal record
Men's freestyle wrestling
Representing South Korea
Asian Games
Bronze medal – third place	2010 Guangzhou	55 kg
Bronze medal – third place	2006 Doha	55 kg
Asian Championships
Gold medal – first place	2009 Pattaya	55 kg
Bronze medal – third place	2004 Tehran	55 kg
World Military Championships
Gold medal – first place	2003 Istanbul	55 kg

Kim Hyo-Sub (born September 23, 1980) is a male freestyle wrestler from South Korea. He participated in Men's freestyle 55 kg at 2004 Summer Olympics and 2008 Summer Olympics. In 1/8 of final he beat Francisco Sanchez from Spain, but was eliminated in the next round by Namig Sevdimov from Azerbaijan.
