= Vladimer Khinchegashvili =

Georgian wrestler (born 1991)

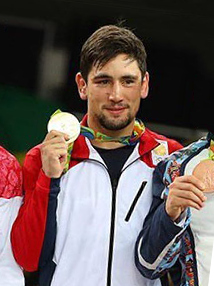
- Khinchegashvili at the 2016 Olympics

Personal information
- Native name: ვლადიმერ ხინჩეგაშვილი
- Nationality: Georgia
- Born: April 18, 1991 (age 35) Gori, Georgia
- Education: Gori State University
- Height: 170 cm (5 ft 7 in)

Sport
- Country: Georgia
- Sport: Wrestling
- Weight class: 55,57,60,61,65 kg
- Event: Freestyle
- Club: Dinamo Gori
- Coached by: Arkadi Khinchikashvili Revaz Kobakhidze (national); Nugzar Skhireli (personal)

Achievements and titles
- Olympic finals: (gold) (2016) (silver) (2012)
- World finals: (gold) (2015) (silver) (2014) (bronze) (2017)
- Regional finals: (gold) (2014) (gold) (2016) (gold) (2017) (silver) (2011) (bronze) (2013) (bronze) (2018)
Medal record
Men's freestyle wrestling
Representing Georgia
Olympic Games
Gold medal – first place	2016 Rio de Janeiro	57 kg
Silver medal – second place	2012 London	55 kg
World Championships
Gold medal – first place	2015 Las Vegas	57 kg
Silver medal – second place	2014 Tashkent	57 kg
Bronze medal – third place	2017 Paris	61 kg
World Cup
Bronze medal – third place	2016 Los Angeles	57 kg
European Games
Silver medal – second place	2019 Minsk	65 kg
European Championships
Gold medal – first place	2014 Vantaa	57 kg
Gold medal – first place	2016 Riga	61 kg
Gold medal – first place	2017 Novi Sad	61 kg
Silver medal – second place	2011 Dortmund	55 kg
Bronze medal – third place	2013 Tbilisi	60 kg
Bronze medal – third place	2018 Kaspiysk	65 kg
World Junior Championships
Gold medal – first place	2011 Bucharest	55 kg
Gold medal – first place	2010 Budapest	55 kg
Bronze medal – third place	2008 Istanbul	55 kg
European Juniors Championships
Gold medal – first place	2011 Zrenjanin	55 kg
Gold medal – first place	2008 Kosice	50 kg
Silver medal – second place	2010 Samokov	55 kg
European Cadets Championships
Gold medal – first place	2008 Daugavpils	54 kg
Bronze medal – third place	2007 Warsaw	50 kg
- Updated on 24 March 2012

Vladimer Khinchegashvili (Georgian: ვლადიმერ ხინჩეგაშვილი; born April 18, 1991) is a Georgian freestyle wrestler who competes in 55–61 kg categories. He won a silver medal at the 2012 Olympics and a gold at the 2016 Olympics. He also won a world title in 2015 and European titles in 2014, 2016 and 2017. In 2015, he was selected as Male Georgian Athlete of the Year by the Georgian Ministry of Sport and Youth Affairs.

In politics, he is a current member of the Parliament of Georgia for the Georgian Dream party, having begun serving in 2024 during the 11th Parliament. He previously served as the Mayor of Gori Municipality from 2021 to 2024.

== Career ==
=== 2012 Summer Olympics ===
At the 2012 Summer Olympics, Khinchegashvili beat Ibrahim Farag in the first round, before beating Radoslav Velikov, Amit Kumar, and Shinichi Yumoto. In the Olympic final, he lost to Dzhamal Otarsultanov.

Following his medal at the 2012 Olympics, Khinchegashvili won silver at the 2014 World Championships. Khinchegashvili followed this by winning the gold medal at the 2015 World Championships. That year, he and Belarusian wrestler, Vladislav Andreev, were disqualified from the European Games, after their semifinal match descended into a brawl.

=== 2016 Summer Olympics ===
At the 2016 Summer Olympics, Khinchegashvili received a bye in the first round, before beating Nurislam Sanayev in the second round. He beat Haji Aliyev and Vladimir Dubov before beating Rei Higuchi to win Olympic gold.

In 2017, he won a bronze medal at the World Championships.

He received the Presidential Order of Excellence in 2018.

=== Real American Freestyle ===
Khinchegashvili signed with Real American Freestyle (RAF) in 2026, and debuted with a loss to Bo Bassett at RAF 07. This fight earned him a Match of the Night award.

He was victorious by 8–5 decision over Johnni DiJulius at RAF 08.
