= Asadulla Lachinau =

Russian-Belarusian freestyle wrestler

Personal information
- Born: April 17, 1986 (age 40)

Asadulla Lachinau, a.k.a. Asabdullah Lachinov (born April 17, 1986 in Dagestan, Russia) is a Russian-Belarusian freestyle wrestler. He competed in the men's freestyle 57 kg event at the 2016 Summer Olympics, in which he was eliminated in the repechage by Yang Kyong-il.
