= Jong Hak-jin =

North Korean freestyle wrestler (born 1986)

Personal information
- Native name: 정학진
- Nationality: North Korea
- Born: December 22, 1986 (age 39)
- Height: 1.68 m (5 ft 6 in)

Sport
- Country: North Korea
- Sport: Wrestling
- Event: 57 kg freestyle
Medal record
Men's Freestyle wrestling
Representing North Korea
Asian Games
Gold medal – first place	2014 Incheon	57 kg
Asian Championships
Silver medal – second place	2016 Bangkok	57 kg

Jong Hak-Jin (Korean: 정학진; born 22 December 1986) is a North Korean wrestler, winner of the world championships. He began the sport at age 11. He clinched the gold medal at the Wrestling Men's freestyle 51 kg event at the 2014 Asian Games.
