= John Pineda =

Canadian wrestler

Personal information
- Nationality: Canadian
- Born: 2 July 1982 (age 42); San Francisco, California
- Weight: 57 kg (126 lb)

Sport
- Sport: Freestyle wrestling
- Club: Burnaby Mountain Wrestling Club

John Pineda (born July 2, 1982) is a Canadian freestyle wrestler.

== Career ==
Pineda won a bronze medal at the 2008 Pan American Championships. He participated in four World Wrestling Championships, finishing 13th in 2010 and 2013. In 2015, he won the bronze medal at the Grand Prix of Paris and a gold medal at the Gramma Cup in Havana. He was expected to compete at the 2015 Pan American Games but did not make weight and had to withdraw from the event.
