= Nikolay Noev =

Tajikistani freestyle wrestler (1988–2026)

Nikolay Noev (né Ayanitov; (Note: Russian: Аянитов) Russian: Николай Ноев; 24 February 1988 – 12 September 2026) was a Yakut Russian-born naturalized Tajik freestyle wrestler. Born in Yakut SSR, he competed in the freestyle 55 kg event at the 2012 Summer Olympics and was defeated by Radoslav Velikov in the qualification round.

Noev died on 12 September 2026, at the age of 38.
