= Francisco Sánchez (wrestler, born 1979) =

Spanish freestyle wrestler (born 1979)

Personal information
- Full name: Francisco Javier Sánchez Parra
- Born: 30 June 1979 (age 47) Mallorca, Spain
- Height: 162 cm (5 ft 4 in)

Sport
- Weight class: 55 kg (121 lb)
Medal record
Men's freestyle wrestling
Representing Spain
Mediterranean Games
Gold medal – first place	2005 Almería	– 55 kg

Francisco Javier Sánchez Parra (Note: In this Spanish name, the first or paternal surname is Sánchez and the second or maternal family name is Parra.) (born 30 June 1979 in Mallorca) is a male freestyle wrestler from Spain. He participated in the men's freestyle (– 55 kg) at 2008 Summer Olympics losing in 1/8 of final to Kim Hyo-Sub.
