= Rizvan Gadzhiev =

Belarusian wrestler (born 1987)

Medal record

Representing Belarus

Men's Freestyle Wrestling

FILA Wrestling World Championships
Bronze medal – third place	2007	55 kg
Bronze medal – third place	2009	55 kg

European Wrestling Championships
Silver medal – second place	2008 Tampere	55 kg

Rizvan Gadzhiev (born 6 January 1987 in Makhachkala, Dagestan ASSR) is a freestyle wrestler from Belarus. He participated in Men's freestyle 55 kg at 2008 Summer Olympics. He lost in 1/8 (after beating Maikel Perez in 1/16 of final) with Dilshod Mansurov from Uzbekistan.

Gadzhiev won a bronze medal on 2007 FILA Wrestling World Championships and silver one on 2008 European Wrestling Championships.
