= Radoslav Velikov =

Bulgarian freestyle wrestler

Medal record

Men's freestyle wrestling

Representing Bulgaria

Olympic Games
Bronze medal – third place	2008 Beijing	55 kg

World Championships
Gold medal – first place	2006 Guangzhou	55 kg
Silver medal – second place	2005 Budapest	55 kg
Silver medal – second place	2011 Istanbul	55 kg

European Championships
Silver medal – second place	2005 Varna	55 kg
Silver medal – second place	2010 Baku	55 kg
Bronze medal – third place	2007 Sofia	55 kg
Bronze medal – third place	2009 Vilnius	55 kg

Radoslav Marinov Velikov (Bulgarian: Радослав Маринов Великов; born 2 September 1983 in Kutsina, Veliko Tarnovo Province) is a Bulgarian freestyle wrestler. He has been engaged in wrestling since 1997 and he currently competes for Levski Sofia, where his coach is former world champion and triple European champion Simeon Shterev, who also used to coach Stanka Zlateva. Velikov won the 2006 World Championships in Guangzhou and came second in 2005 in Budapest. He came second at the European Championships in Varna in 2005 and third in Europe in Sofia in 2007. At the 2004 Summer Olympics in Athens he came ninth.

At the 2008 Summer Olympics in Beijing, he won bronze in his category (55 kilograms). Velikov clinched the bronze medal in Beijing despite a serious injury of his left knee immediately before the tournament which put his participation in doubt. He nevertheless took part in the Olympics thanks to painkillers.

He missed out on another bronze medal at the 2012 Summer Olympics, losing to Shinichi Yumoto in his bronze medal match.
