= Hamed Talebi =

Iranian wrestler (born 1991)

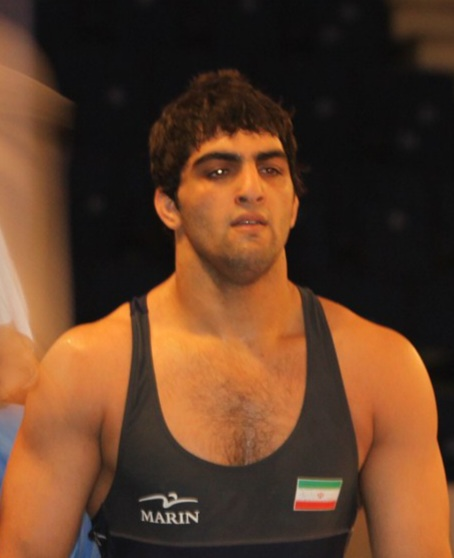
- Talebi in 2011

Personal information
- Native name: حامد طالبی
- Full name: Hamed Talebi Zarrinkamar
- Nationality: Iranian
- Born: July 24, 1991 (age 35) Babol, Mazandaran, Iran
- Occupation: Amateur wrestler
- Years active: 2002 - 2019
- Height: 1.83 m (6 ft 0 in)
- Weight: 96 kg (212 lb)

Sport
- Country: Iran
- Sport: Wrestling
- Event: Freestyle
- Club: Azadgan Babol
- Team: National Iran
- Turned pro: 2010
- Coached by: Ali Shokripour; Ali Khorasani; Rasoul Khadem; Alireza Rezaei
Medal record
Event	1st	2nd	3rd
World Championship	1	–	–
Asian Championship	2	–	–
world cup	1	–	1
World Club Cup	1	1	–
Other	7	1	3
total	12	2	4
Representing Iran
Men's freestyle wrestling
U20 World Championships
Gold medal – first place	2011 Bucharest	96 kg
Asian Championship
Gold medal – first place	2008 Tashkent	85 kg
Gold medal – first place	2011 Jakarta	96 kg
World Cup
Bronze medal – third place	2011 Germany	Team
Gold medal – first place	2014 Los Angeles	Team
World Club Cup
Gold medal – first place	2018 Babol	Team
Silver medal – second place	2019 Bojnord	Team
Grand prize
Gold medal – first place	2009 Mashhad	84 kg
Gold medal – first place	2010 Armenia	84 kg
Gold medal – first place	2010 Urmia	84 kg
Gold medal – first place	2011 Baku	96 kg
Gold medal – first place	2011 Bulgaria	96 kg
Silver medal – second place	2011 Babol	Team
Bronze medal – third place	2012 Russia	96 kg
Bronze medal – third place	2013 Tehran	Team
Gold medal – first place	2014 Tehran	97 kg
Bronze medal – third place	2019 kermanshah	97 kg
Gold medal – first place	2019 Sassari	97 kg

Hamed Talebi Zarrinkamar (Persian: حامد طالبی زرین‌کمر; born 24 July 1991 in Babol) is an Iranian freestyle wrestler. He won the gold medal in the 96 kg weight category at the 2011 World Junior Wrestling Championships held in Bucharest, Romania. He won the gold medal at the 2008 Asian Championships and the 2011 Asian Championships.

== Career ==
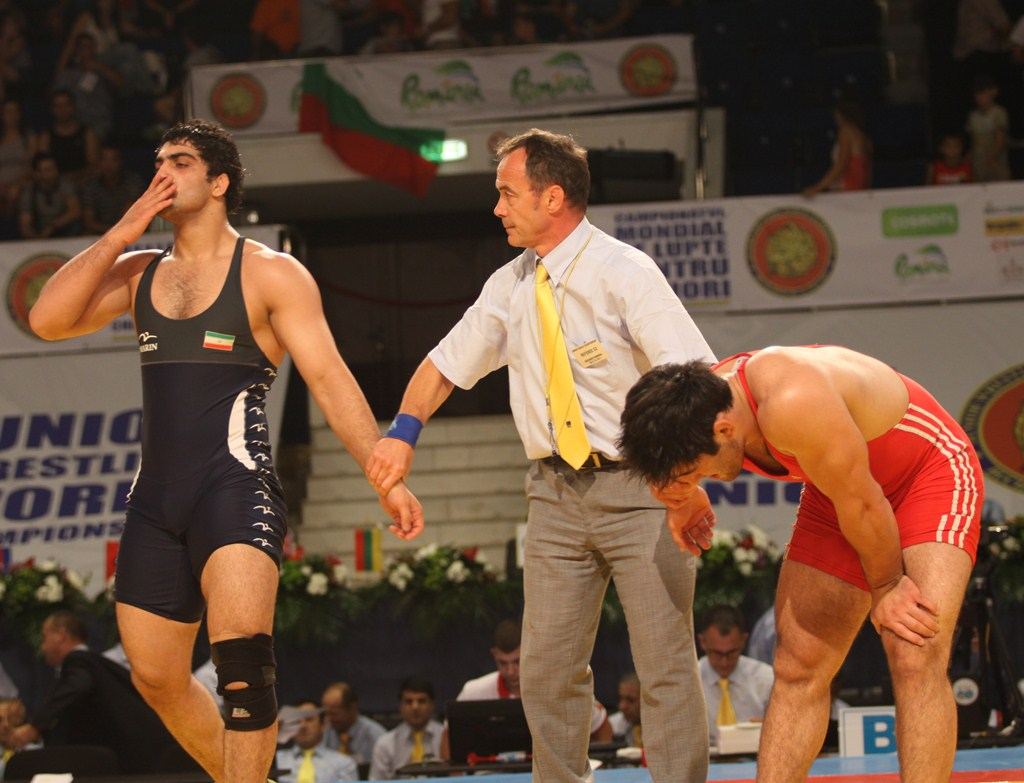
Talebi celebrates after defeating Georgia's Mamuka Kordzaia in the men's 96kg freestyle wrestling event at the 2011 World Championships in Bucharest.

Talebi finished third at the 2011 Men's Freestyle Wrestling World Cup in Germany,and won the gold medal at the 2014 FILA Wrestling World Cup in Los Angeles. Initially a member of Iran's national cadet freestyle wrestling team in the 84 kg weight class, Talebi secured 7 gold, 2 silver, and 4 bronze medals across various international tournaments and world competitions. He also won gold with the "Bimeh Razi" team at the 2018 World Club Cup in Babol,and silver with the Mazandaran Azad University team at the 2019 World Club Cup in Bojnurd, Furthermore, he added the following to his record: gold medals at the 2009 National Championships in Mashhad, the 2010 "Razi Golestan" International Tournament in Armenia, the 2010 Urmia International Tournament, the 2011 Baku International Tournament in Azerbaijan, the 2011 "Sirakov" International Tournament in Bulgaria, the 2014 Takhti Cup in Tehran. and the 2019 Sassari Tournament silver medal with the "Khoneh Be Khoneh Babol" team in 2011 (Seyyed Rasoul Hosseini Sports Hall); and bronze medals in the Premier League with the "Khoneh Be Khoneh Babol" team in 2013 (Azadi 12,000-Seater Hall, Tehran), as well as at the 2012 "Russian Empire" International Tournament, and the 2019 Takhti Cup in Kermanshah.

== Achievements ==
- World Championship (gold) – 2011
- Asian Championship (gold) – 2008, (gold) 2011
- World Cup (bronze) – 2011, (gold) 2014
- World Club Cup (gold) – 2018, (silver) 2019
- Mashhad National Gold Championship (gold) – 2009
- International Tournament Armenia (gold) – 2010
- medalist of the Urmia Martyrs' Cup (gold) – 2010
- International Championship Cup Baku (gold) – 2011
- International Championship Cup Syrakov Bulgaria (gold) – 2011
- Team Khoneh Be Khoneh Babol (silver) – 2011, (bronze) 2013
- International tournament Ali Aliyev Cup (bronze) – 2012
- International tournament Takhti Cup (gold) – 2014, (bronze) 2019
- International Tournament Matteo Pellicone (gold) – 2019

== Major results ==
Year	Competition	Venue	Position	Event	Notes
Representing Iran
2011	2011 World Junior Championships	Bucharest, Romania	1st	Freestyle 96 kg	
2011	2011 Iranian Premier Wrestling League	Babol, Iran	1st	Team	
2013	2013 Iranian Premier Wrestling League	Tehran, Iran	1st	Team	
2014	2014 FILA World Cup	Los Angeles, American	1st	Team	
2018	2018 World Club Cup	Babol, Iran	1st	Team	

== Senior career results ==
International Senior Freestyle matches
Res.	Record	Opponent	Score	Date	Event	Location
2021 Poland Open (silver) at 97 kg
Loss	22–6	(Iran) Mohammad Hossein Mohammadian	1–1	June 8, 2021	2021 Poland Open	Warsaw, Poland
Win	22–5	(Kazakhstan) Alisher Yergali	7–2	June 8, 2021	2021 Poland Open	Warsaw, Poland
Win	21–5	(North Macedonia) Magomedgadzhi Nurov	9–2	June 8, 2021	2021 Poland Open	Warsaw, Poland
2021 Asian Championships (gold) at 97 kg
Win	20–5	(Kazakhstan) Alisher Yergali	TF 12–2	April 13–18, 2021	2021 Asian Continental Championships	Almaty, Kazakhstan
Win	19–5	(India) Satyawart Kadian	TF 10–0	April 13–18, 2021	2021 Asian Continental Championships	Almaty, Kazakhstan
Win	18–5	(South Korea) Minwon Seo	TF 11–0	April 13–18, 2021	2021 Asian Continental Championships	Almaty, Kazakhstan
2020 Iranian Premier Wrestling League 4th as Team Ghaemshahr at 97 kg
Win	17–5	(Iran) Hossein Shahbazi	5–0	December 17, 2020	2020 Iranian Premier Wrestling League	Tehran, Iran
Win	16–5	(Iran) Alireza Safar		December 17, 2020	2020 Iranian Premier Wrestling League	Tehran, Iran
2020 IRI World Team Trials (gold) at 97 kg
Win	15–5	(Iran) Mohammad Hossein Mohammadian	4–0	November 5, 2020	2020 Iranian World Team Trials	Tehran, Iran
Win	14–5	(Iran) Mohammad Hossein Mohammadian	8–4	November 5, 2020	2020 Iranian World Team Trials	Tehran, Iran
Win	13–5	(Iran) Danial Shariati	6–2	November 5, 2020	2020 Iranian World Team Trials	Tehran, Iran
Win	12–5	(Iran) Mojtaba Goleij	7–3	November 5, 2020	2020 Iranian World Team Trials	Tehran, Iran
2020 Takhti Cup (bronze) at 97 kg
Win	11–5	(Iran) Esmaeil Nejatian	FF	January 7–8, 2020	2020 Takhti Cup	Kermanshah, Iran
Loss	10–5	(Iran) Mojtaba Goleij	4–6	January 7–8, 2020	2020 Takhti Cup	Kermanshah, Iran
2019 World Clubs Cup (gold) as Team Bazar-e Bozorg at 97 kg
Win	10–4	(China) Rusidanmu Reheman	TF 11–0	December 19, 2019	2019 World Clubs Cup	Isfahan, Iran
2019 World Championships 10th at 97 kg
Loss	9–4	(Georgia (country)) Elizbar Odikadze	8–11	September 21, 2019	2019 World Championships	Nur-Sultan, Kazakhstan
Win	8–3	(Turkey) Ibrahim Ciftci	9–1	September 21, 2019	2019 World Championships	Nur-Sultan, Kazakhstan
2019 Yasar Dogu (silver) at 97 kg
Loss	7–3	(United States) Kyle Snyder	1–2	July 11, 2019	2019 Yasar Dogu International	Istanbul, Turkey
Win	7–2	(Azerbaijan) Aslanbek Alborov	TF 10–0	July 11, 2019	2019 Yasar Dogu International	Istanbul, Turkey
Win	6–2	(Turkey) Fatih Yaşarlı	TF 10–0	July 11, 2019	2019 Yasar Dogu International	Istanbul, Turkey
Win	5–2	(Italy) Abraham Conyedo	6–2	July 11, 2019	2019 Yasar Dogu International	Istanbul, Turkey
2019 IRI World Team Trials (silver) at 97 kg
Loss	4–2	(Iran) Reza Yazdani	1–2	July 1, 2019	2019 IRI World Team Trials	Mazandaran Province, Iran
Win	4–1	(Iran) Hamed Talebi Zarrinkamar	3–2	July 1, 2019	2019 IRI World Team Trials	Mazandaran Province, Iran
2018 U23 World Championships (bronze) at 97 kg
Win	3–1	(China) Chaoqiang Yang	TF 11–0	November 12–18, 2018	2018 U23 World Championships	Bucharest, Romania
Loss	2–1	(Georgia (country)) Givi Matcharashvili	TF 0–10	November 12–18, 2018	2018 U23 World Championships	Bucharest, Romania
Win	2–0	(Germany) Erik Thiele	8–0	November 12–18, 2018	2018 U23 World Championships	Bucharest, Romania
Win	1–0	(Italy) Simone Iannattoni	TF 11–0	November 12–18, 2018	2018 U23 World Championships	Bucharest, Romania

== Ban from wrestling ==
Talebi was suspended from wrestling from March 2018 to March 2022 due to taking the banned substance oxandrolone.
