= 2014 FILA Wrestling World Cup – Men's freestyle =

Men's freestyle at the 2014 Wrestling World Cup
- Venue: L.A. Forum
- Location: Inglewood, California, United States
- Dates: 15–16 March

Medalists
gold medal	Iran
silver medal	United States
bronze medal	Azerbaijan

The 2014 FILA Wrestling World Cup - Men's freestyle was the first of a set of three Wrestling World Cups in 2014 - one for each major discipline. The event took place in Inglewood, California March 15 and 16, 2014.

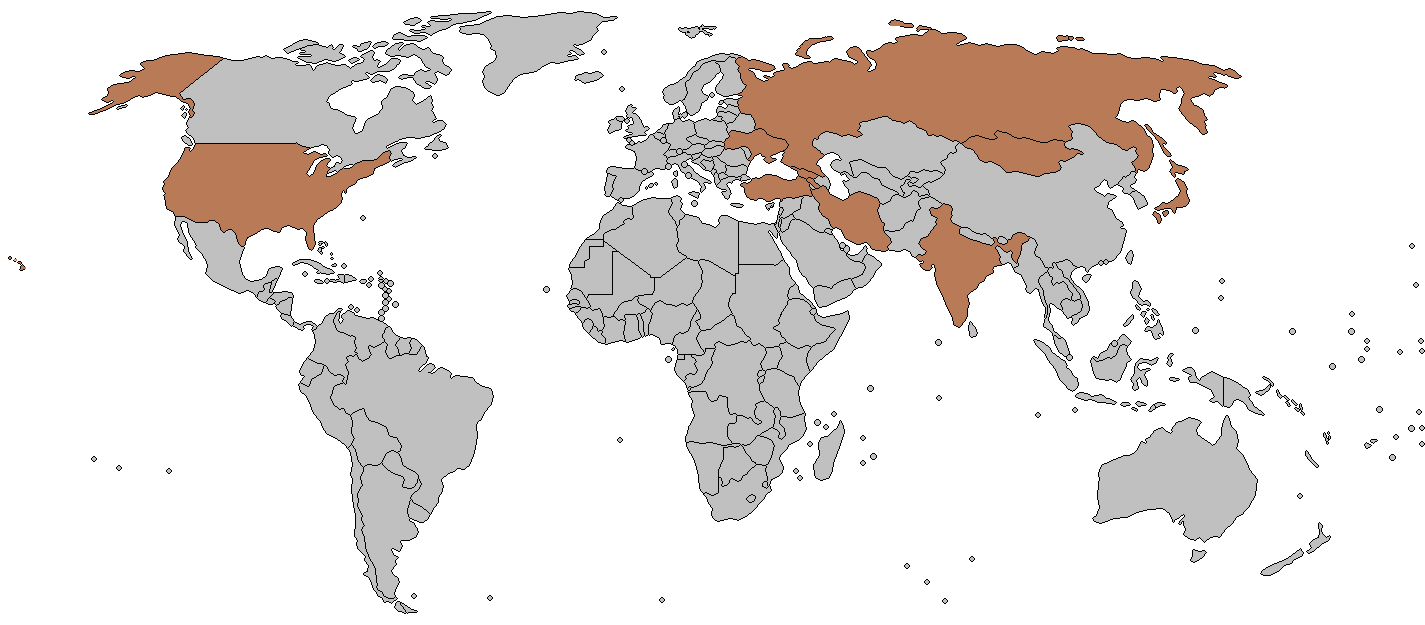
Countries took part in 2014 FILA Wrestling World Cup - Men's freestyle.

== Pool stage ==
Team competes for 1st place
Team competes for 3rd place
Team competes for 5th place
Team competes for 7th place
Team competes for 9th place

=== Pool A ===
Team	Pld	W	L	TF	PF	PA
Iran	4	4	0	19	130	111
United States	4	3	1	15	111	79
India	4	2	2	3	55	56
Turkey	4	1	3	2	46	58
Armenia	4	0	4	6	41	73

POOL A
Round I

United States 7 - Armenia 1
57 kg – Angel Escobedo (USA) df. Artak Hovhannisyan (ARM), 11-4
61 kg – Reece Humphrey (USA) df. Valodya Frangulyan (ARM), 5-4
65 kg – Brent Metcalf (USA) df. Artur Arakelyan (ARM) via TF, 11-1
70 kg – Davit Apoyan (ARM) df. Nick Marable (USA), 10-7
74 kg – Jordan Burroughs (USA) df Varuzhan Kajoyan (ARM) via fall, 3:38
86 kg – Keith Gavin (USA) df. Vahe Tamrazyan (ARM), 6-1
97 kg – Dustin Kilgor (USA) df. Viktor Kazishvili (ARM), 10-0
125 kg – Tervel Dlagnev (USA) df. Andranik Gastyan (ARM), 11-0

India 5 - Turkey 3
57 kg – Amit Kumar (IND) df. Nebi Uzun (TUR), 7-0
61 kg – Bajrang Kumar (IND) df. Recep Topal (TUR), 4-2
65 kg – Selahattin Kılıçsallayan (TUR) df. Rajneesh Rajneesh (IND), 15-7
70 kg – Amit Kumar Dhankar (IND) df. Mustafa Kaya (TUR), 8-4
74 kg – Parveen Rana (IND) df. Murat Ertürk (TUR), 8-6
86 kg – Fatih Erdin (TUR) df. Pawan Kumar (IND), 6-1
97 kg – Saywart Kadian (IND) df. Ali Bönceoğlu (TUR), 6-2
125 kg – Hamza Özkaradeniz (TUR) win by forfeit

Round II

United States 6 - India 2
57 kg – Amit Kumar (IND) df. Andrew Hochstrasser (USA), 4-3
61 kg – Bajrang Kumar (IND) df. Jimmy Kennedy (USA), 10-6
65 kg – Brent Metcalf (USA) df. Rajneesh Rajneesh (IND), 7-6
70 kg – Moza Fay (USA) df. Amit Kumar Dhankar (IND), 11-0
74 kg – Jordan Burroughs (USA) df Parveen Rana (IND) by fall, 2:44
84 kg – Clayton Foster (USA) df. Pawan Kumar by TF, 10-0
97 kg – J.D. Bergman (USA) df. Saywart Kadian (IND)
125 kg – Tervel Dlagnev (USA) won by forfeit

Iran 8 - Armenia 0
57 kg – Hassan Rahimi (IRI) df. Artak Hovhannisyan (ARM) by TF, 10-0
61 kg – Masoud Esmaeilpour (IRI) df. Valodya Frangulyan (ARM) by TF, 11-1
65 kg – Meisam Nasiri (IRI) df. Artur Arakelyan (ARM) by TF, 14-4
70 kg – Mostafa Hosseinkhani (IRI) df. Davit Apoyan (ARM) by TF, 11-0
74 kg – Ezzatollah Akbari (IRI) df. Varuzhan Kajoyan ( ARM ) by TF, 11-1
84 kg – Ehsan Lashgari (IRI) df. Vahe Tamrazyan (ARM) by TF, 10-0
97 kg – Reza Yazdani (IRI) df. Viktor Kazishvili (ARM) by FALL, 2:33
125 kg – Komeil Ghasemi (IRI) df. Andranik Galstyan (ARM) by TF, 15-4

Round III

Iran 7 - Turkey 1
57 kg – Mehran Rezazadeh (IRI) df. Nebi Uzun (TUR) by TF, 20-8
61 kg – Masoud Esmaeilpour (IRI) df. Recep Topal (TUR) by FALL, 5:25
65 kg – Seyed Ahmad Mohammadi (IRI) df. Selahattin Kılıçsallayan (TUR) by TF, 11-0
70 kg – Mustafa Kaya (TUR) df. Peyman Yarahmadi (IRI), 11-9
74 kg – Reza Afzali (IRI) df. Murat Ertürk (TUR) by TF, 11-0
86 kg – Alireza Karimi (IRI) df. Fatih Erdin (TUR) by TF, 11-1
97 kg – Hamed Talebi Zarrinkamar (IRI) df. Ali Bönceoğlu (TUR) by TF, 10-0
125 kg – Parviz Hadi (IRI) df. Hamza Özkaradeniz (TUR) by TF, 11-0

India 4 - Armenia 4 (India wins on criteria)
57 kg – Amit Kumar (IND) df. Artak Hovhannisyan (ARM), 11-6
61 kg – Valodya Frangulyan (ARM) df. Bajrang Kumar (IND), 10-8
65 kg – Rajneesh Rajneesh (IND) df. Artur Arakelyan (ARM ) by FALL, 2:00
70 kg – Davit Apoyan (ARM) df. Amit Kumar Dhankar (IND) by FALL, 5:00
74 kg – Parveen Rana (IND) df. Artak Hovhannisyan (ARM) by FALL, 3:00
86 kg – Vahe Tamrazyan (ARM) df. Pawan Kumar (IND)by FALL, 3:00
97 kg – Saywart Kadian (IND) df. Viktor Kazishvili (ARM) by FALL, 3:00
125 kg – Andranik Galstyan (ARM) won by forfeit

Iran 5 - United States 3
57 kg – Hassan Rahimi (IRI) df. Angel Escobedo (USA), 8-0
61 kg – Masoud Esmaeilpour (IRI) df. Reece Humphrey (USA), 10-8
65 kg – Brent Metcalf (USA) df. Meisam Nasiri (IRI), 11-8
70 kg – Mostafa Hosseinkhani (IRI) df. Nick Marable (USA), 1-0
74 kg – Jordan Burroughs (USA) df. Ezzatollah Akbari (IRI), 7-1
86 kg – Clayton Foster (USA) df. Ehsan Lashgari (IRI), 7-5
97 kg – Reza Yazdani (IRI) df. J.D. Bergman (USA), 8-0
125 kg – Komeil Ghasemi (IRI) df. Tervel Dlagnev (USA), 1-0

Turkey 5 - Armenia 3
57 kg – Artak Hovhannisyan (ARM) df Nebi Uzun (TUR) by FALL, 15-4
61 kg – Recep Topal (TUR) df. Valodya Frangulyan (ARM), 7-1
65 kg – Selahattin Kılıçsallayan (TUR) df. Artur Arakelyan (ARM), 12-4
70 kg – Mustafa Kaya (TUR) df. Davit Apoyan (ARM), 16-12
74 kg – Murat Ertürk (TUR) df. Varuzhan Kajoyan (ARM) by FALL, 16-5
86 kg – Fatih Erdin (TUR) df. Vahe Tamrazyan (ARM), 7-0
97 kg – Viktor Kazishvili (ARM) df. Ali Bönceoğlu (TUR) by FALL, 1:16
125 kg – Andranik Galstyan (ARM) df. Hamza Özkaradeniz (TUR) by FALL, 4:09

Round IV

United States 8 - Turkey 0
57 kg – Angel Escobedo (USA) df. Nebi Uzun (TUR) by FALL, 2:50
61 kg – Jimmy Kennedy (USA) df. Recep Topal (TUR) by TF, 10-0
65 kg – Brent Metcalf (USA) df. Selahattin Kılıçsallayan (TUR) by TF, 10-0
70 kg – Nick Marable (USA) df. Mustafa Kaya (TUR) by TF, 13-0
74 kg – Jordan Burroughs (USA) df. Murat Ertürk (TUR) by FALL, 2:17
86 kg – Clayton Foster (USA) df. Fatih Erdin (TUR), 16-9
97 kg – J.D. Bergman (USA) df. Ali Bönceoğlu (TUR), 6-4
125 kg – Tervel Dlagnev (USA) wins by forfeit

Iran 8 - India 0
57 kg – Hassan Rahimi (IRI) won by forfeit
61 kg – Masoud Esmaeilpour (IRI) df. Bajrang Bajrang (IND), 5-0
65 kg – Meisam Nasiri (IRI) df. Rajneesh Rajneesh (IND), 5-0
70 kg – Mostafa Hosseinkhani (IRI) df. Amit Kumar Dhankar (IND), 5-0
74 kg – Reza Afzali (IRI) df. Parveen Rana (IND), 6-0
86 kg – Ehsan Lashgari (IRI) df. Pawan Kumar (IND) by TF, 10-0
97 kg – Hamed Talebi Zarrinkamar (IRI) df. Saywart Kadian (IND) byt TF, 11-0
125 kg – Parviz Hadi (IRI) won by forfeit

=== Pool B ===
Team	Pld	W	D	L	TF	PF	PA
Russia	4	4	0	0		42	22
Ukraine	4	3	0	1		57	48
Mongolia	4	2	0	2		38	31
Japan	4	1	0	3		44	68
Georgia	4	0	0	4		29	41

POOL A
Round I

Georgia 3 - Japan 5
57 kg – Fumitaka Morishita (JPN) df. Beka Bujiashvili (GEO), by Fall
61 kg – Beka Lomtadze (GEO) df. Katsuyoshi Kawase (JPN), by TF, 10-0
65 kg – Daichi Takatani (JPN) df. Zurabi Iakobishvili (GEO), 9-3
70 kg – Ken Hosaka (JPN) df. Levan kelekhsashvili (GEO), 7-6
74 kg – Sohsuke Takatani (JPN) df. Giorgi Marsagishvili (GEO), 9-4
86 kg – Atsushi Matsumoto (JPN) df. levan Gogrichiani (GEO), 3-2
97 kg – Eldar Kurtanidze (GEO) df. Koki Ymamoto (JPN), 4-2
125 kg – Giorgi Sakandelidze (GEO) df. Nobuyoshi Arakida (JPN), by TF, 10-0

Russia 4 df. - Mongolia 4
57 kg – Viktor Lebedev (RUS) df. Batbold Nomin (MGL), 10-4
61 kg – Nyam-Ochir Enkhsaikhan (MGL) df. Murad Nukhadiev (RUS), 12-4
65 kg – Ganzorigiin Mandakhnaran (MGL) df. Alibeggadzhi Emeev (RUS), 4-2
70 kg – Ankhbayar Batchuluun (MGL) df. Ramazan Shamsutdinov (RUS), 6-1
74 kg – Akhmed Gadzhimagomedov (RUS) df Pürevjavyn Önörbat (MGL), 11-5
86 kg – Shamil Kudiyamagomedov (RUS) df. Uitumen Orgodol (MGL), by TF, 11-0
97 kg – Vladislav Baitcaev (RUS) df. Khuderbulga Dorjkhand (MGL), by TF, 11-0
125 kg – Chuluunbat Jargalsaikhan (MGL) df. Arslanbek Aliev (RUS), 6-6

Round II

Japan 4 - Mongolia 4 df.
57 kg – Fumitaka Morishita (JPN) df. Batbold Nomin (MGL), 7-6
61 kg – Nyam-Ochir Enkhsaikhan (MGL) df. Katsuyoshi Kawase (JPN), by Fall
65 kg – Daichi Takatani (JPN) df. Ganzorigiin Mandakhnaran (MGL), by TF, 12-2
70 kg – Ken Hosaka (JPN) df. Ankhbayar Batchuluun (MGL), by TF, 11-1
74 kg – Pürevjavyn Önörbat (MGL) df. Sohsuke Takatani (JPN), 3-2
86 kg – Atsushi Matsumoto (JPN) df. Uitumen Orgodol (MGL), 8-4
97 kg – Khuderbulga Dorjkhand (MGL) df. Koki Ymamoto (JPN), by TF, 10-0
125 kg – Chuluunbat Jargalsaikhan (MGL) df. Nobuyoshi Arakida (JPN), 4-0

Russia 7 - Ukraine 1
57 kg – Viktor Lebedev (RUS) df. Batbold Nomin (UKR), 10-4
61 kg – Aleksandr Bogomoev (RUS) df. Vasyl Fedoryshyn (UKR), 6-1
65 kg – Soslan Ramonov (RUS) df. Ivan Pertiv (UKR), by TF, 13-3
70 kg – Ankhbayar Batchuluun (RUS) df. Ramazan Shamsutdinov (UKR), 3-0
74 kg – Atsamaz Sanakoev (RUS) df. Pürevjavyn Önörbat (UKR), 6-5
86 kg – Anzor Urishev (RUS) df. Ibragim Aldatov (UKR), 7-0
97 kg – Yuri Belonovski (RUS) df. Khuderbulga Dorjkhand (UKR), 2-2
125 kg – Alen Zasieiev (UKR) df. Arslanbek Aliev (RUS), 7-0

Round III

Georgia 3 - Mongolia 5
57 kg – Batbold Nomin (MGL) df. Otari Gogava (GEO), 11-7
61 kg – Beka Lomtadze (GEO) df. Nyam-Ochir Enkhsaikhan (MGL), 11-7
65 kg – Ganzorigiin Mandakhnaran (MGL) df. Zurabi Iakobishvili (GEO), 8-1
70 kg – Ankhbayar Batchuluun (MGL) df. Levan kelekhsashvili (GEO), by TF, 10-0
74 kg – Pürevjavyn Önörbat (MGL) df. Giorgi Marsagishvili (GEO), 6-4
86 kg – Uitumen Orgodol (MGL) df. levan Gogrichiani (GEO), by TF, 11-0
97 kg – Nodar Egadze (GEO) df. Khuderbulga Dorjkhand (MGL), 5-2
125 kg – Geno Petriashvili (GEO) df. Chuluunbat Jargalsaikhan (MGL), 4-1

Ukraine 7 - Japan 1
57 kg – Sergiy Ratushny (UKR) won by forfeit
61 kg – Vasyl Fedoryshyn (UKR) df. Katsuyoshi Kawase (JPN)by TF, 11-0
65 kg – Daichi Takatani (JPN) df. Ivan Pertiv (UKR), by TF, 10-0
70 kg – Andriy Kvyatkovskyy (UKR) df. Ken Hosaka (JPN), 5-0
74 kg – Giya Chykhladze (UKR) df. Sohsuke Takatani (JPN), 6-1
86 kg – Ibragim Aldatov (UKR) df. Atssuhi Matsumoto (JPN), by TF, 12-0
97 kg – Pavlo Oliiynk (UKR) df. Koki Ymamoto (JPN), by TF, 12-1
125 kg – Alen Zasieiev (UKR) df. Nobuyoshi Arakida (JPN), 8-4

Russia 7 - Japan 1
57 kg – Flegontov Vladimir (RUS) df. won by forfeit
61 kg – Aleksandr Bogomoev (RUS) df. won by forfeit
65 kg – Daichi Takatani (JPN) df. Alibeggadzhi Emeev (RUS), 6-4
70 kg – Khetag Tsabolov (RUS) df. Ken Hosake (JPN), by Fall
74 kg – Akhmed Gadzhimagomedov (RUS) df. Sohsuke Takatani (JPN), 6-5
86 kg – Shamil Kudiyamagomedov (RUS) df. Atsushi Matsumoto (JPN), bt TF, 10-0
97 kg – Yuri Belonovski (RUS) df. Koki Ymamoto (JPN), by Fall
125 kg – Arslanbek Aliev (RUS) df. Nobuyoshi Arakida (JPN), By TF, 10-0

Ukraine 5 - Georgia 3
57 kg – Beka Bujiashvili (GEO) df. Sergiy Ratushny (UKR), 6-5
61 kg – Beka Lomtadze (GEO) df. Vasyl Fedoryshyn (UKR), 13-6
65 kg – Zurabi Iakobishvili (GEO) df. Ivan Pertiv (UKR), 7-0
70 kg – Andriy Kvyatkovskyy (UKR) df. Giorgi Tsurskiridze (GEO), (inj)
74 kg – Giya Chykhladze (UKR) df. Giorgi Marsagishvili (GEO), by Fall
86 kg – Ibragim Aldatov (UKR) won by forfeit
97 kg – Pavlo Oliiynk (UKR) df. Nodar Egadze (GEO)by TF, 11-0
125 kg – Alen Zasieiev (UKR) df. Geno Petriashvili (GEO), 15-9

Round IV

Georgia 1 - Russia 7
57 kg – Flegontov Vladimir (RUS) df. Otar Gogava (GEO), 10-2
61 kg – Aleksandr Bogomoev (RUS) df. Beka Lomtadze (GEO), 6-2
65 kg – Alibeggadzhi Emeev (RUS) df. Zurab Iakobishvili (GEO), 4-2
70 kg – Khetag Tsabolov (RUS) df. Levan Kelekhsashvili (GEO) by TF, 11-0
74 kg – Atsamaz Sanakoev (RUS) df. Giorgi Marsagishvili (GEO), 5-2
86 kg – Shamil Kudiyamagomedov (RUS) df. Levan Gogrichiani (GEO), bty Fall
97 kg – Vladislav Baitcaev (RUS) df. Nodar Egadze (GEO), by TF, 10-0
125 kg – Geno Petriashvili (GEO) df. Anzor Khizriev (RUS), by TF, 10-0

Mongolia 3 - Ukraine 5
57 kg – Sergiy Ratushny (UKR) df. Batbold Nomin (MGL)by TF, 14-4
61 kg – Nyam-Ochir Enkhsaikhan (MGL) df. Vasyl Fedoryshyn (UKR), 6-3
65 kg – Ganzorig Mandakhnaran (MGL) df. Ivan Pertiv (UKR), 7-0
70 kg – Andriy Kvyatkovskyy (UKR) df. Ankhbayar Batchuluun (MGL), 13-8
74 kg – Pürevjavyn Önörbat (MGL) df. Giya Chykhladze (UKR), 8-6
86 kg – Ibragim Aldatov (UKR) df. Uitumen Orgodol (MGL), 10-5
97 kg – Pavlo Oliiynk (UKR) df. Khuderbulga Dorjkhand (MGL), 7-3
125 kg – Alen Zasieiev (UKR) df. Chuluunbat Jargalsaikhan (MGL), 6-1

== Medal Matches ==
Medal Matches
First-Place Match

Iran 6 - Russia 2
57 kg – Viktor Lebedev(RUS) df. Hassan Rahimi(IRI), 4-3
61 kg – Masoud Esmaeilpour (IRI) df. Aleksandr Bogomoev (RUS), 12-6
65 kg – Seyed Ahmad Mohammadi (IRI) df. Alibeggadzhi Emeev (RUS) by TF, 10-0
70 kg – Mostafa Hosseinkhani (IRI) df. Khetag Tsabolov (RUS), 9-0
74 kg – Akhmed Gadzhimagomedov (RUS) df. Ezzatollah Akbari (IRI) by TF, 11-0
84 kg – Ehsan Lashgari (IRI) df. Anzor Urishev (RUS), 2-1
97 kg – Reza Yazdani (IRI) df. Yuri Belonovskiy (RUS), 12-2
125 kg – Komeil Ghasemi (IRI) df. Anzor Khezriev (RUS), 3-0

Third-Place Match

United States 7 - Ukraine 1
57 kg – Angel Escobedo (USA) df. Sergiy Ratushny (UKR) by TF, 11-1
61 kg – Jimmy Kennedy (USA) df. Vasyl Fedoryshyn (UKR), 5-1
65 kg – Brent Metcalf (USA) df. Ivan Pertiv (UKR) by TF, 12-2
70 kg – Nick Marable (USA) df. Ankhbayar Batchuluun (UKR), 3-2
74 kg – Jordan Burroughs (USA) df. Giya Chykhladze (UKR) by TF, 15-4
86 kg – Clayton Foster (USA) df. Ibragim Aldatov (UKR), 7-2
97 kg – Pavlo Oliiynk (UKR) df. J.D. Bergman (USA), 4-1
125 kg – Tervel Dlagnev (USA) won by forfeit

Fifth-Place Match

Mongolia 5 - India 3
57 kg – Amit Kumar (IND) df. Batbold Nomin (MGL) (inj)
61 kg – Nyam-Ochir Enkhsaikhan (MGL) df. Bajrang Kumar (IND), 6-5
65 kg – Ganzorigiin Mandakhnaran (MGL) df. Rajneesh Rajneesh (IND)by TF, 11-0
70 kg – Amit Kumar Dhankar (IND) df. Ankhbayar Batchuluun (MGL), 13-8
74 kg – Parveen Rana (IND) df. Pürevjavyn Önörbat (MGL), 6-3
86 kg – Uitumen Orgodol (MGL) df. Pawan Kumar (IND), by TF, 10-0
97 kg – Khuderbulga Dorjkhand (MGL) df. Saywart Kadian (IND), 3-1
125 kg – Chuluunbat Jargalsaikhan (MGL) won by forfeit

Seventh-Place Match

Turkey 6 - Japan 2
57 kg – Nebi Uzun (TUR) won by forfeit
61 kg – Recep Topal (TUR) won by forfeit
65 kg – Daichi Takatani (JPN) df. Selahattin Kılıçsallayan (TUR), by FALL
70 kg – Mustafa Kaya (TUR) df. Ken Hosaka (JPN), by FALL
74 kg – Sohsuke Takatani (JPN) df. Murat Ertürk (TUR) by TF, 10-0
86 kg – Fatih Erdin (TUR) df. Atsushi Matsumoto (JPN), 13-8
97 kg – Ali Bönceoğlu (TUR) df. Koki Ymamoto (JPN), 8-2
125 kg – Hamza Özkaradeniz (TUR) df. Nobuyoshi Arakida (JPN), 11-5

Ninth-Place Match

Georgia 4 - Armenia 4 (Georgia wins by criteria)
57 kg – Artak Hovhannisyan (ARM) df. Beka Bujiashvili (GEO)by TF, 13-3
61 kg – Valodya Frangulyan (ARM) df. Beka Lomtadze (GEO), 18-18
65 kg – Zurabi Iakobishvili (GEO) won by forfeit
70 kg – Levan kelekhsashvili (GEO) df. Davit Apoyan (ARM) (inj)
74 kg – Giorgi Marsagishvili (GEO) df. Varuzhan Kajoyan (ARM)by FALL
86 kg – Vahe Tamrazyan (ARM) won by forfeit
97 kg – Viktor Kazishvili (ARM) df. Nodar Egadze (GEO)by FALL
125 kg – Geno Petriashvili (GEO) df. Andranik Galstyan (ARM)by TF, 11-0

== Final classement ==
Team	Pld	W	D	L
Iran	5	5	0	0
Russia	5	4	0	1
United States	5	4	0	1
Ukraine	5	3	0	2
Mongolia	5	3	0	2
India	5	2	0	3
Turkey	5	2	0	3
Japan	5	1	0	4
Georgia	5	1	0	4
Armenia	5	0	0	5

== See also ==
- 2014 FILA Wrestling World Cup - Women's freestyle
- 2014 FILA Wrestling World Cup - Men's Greco-Roman
