= Esteghlal Wrestling Club =

- Sport: Wrestling
- League: Iranian Premier Wrestling League
- Location: Juybar, Mazandaran province (Freestyle); Qom (Greco-Roman)
- Arena: Mehdi Hajizadeh Hall
- Owner: Persian Gulf Petrochemical Industries
- Chairman: Ali Tajernia
- Manager: Freestyle: Komeil Ghasemi; Greco-Roman: Rouhollah Mikaeili
- Website: www.fcesteghlal.ir

Esteghlal Wrestling Club (Persian: باشگاه کشتی استقلال) is the wrestling department of Esteghlal Sports Club, an Iranian multi-sport club based in Tehran, Iran. The club operates teams in both freestyle and Greco-Roman wrestling, competing in the Iranian Freestyle Wrestling Premier League and the Iranian Greco-Roman Wrestling Premier League. Since 2025, the freestyle team has been based in Juybar, Mazandaran province, while the Greco-Roman team has been based in Qom.

== History ==
=== Early years (1950s–1979) ===
The wrestling section of the former Taj Sports and Cultural Organization (the predecessor of Esteghlal Sports Club) was established during the early 1950s. During the 1950s, 1960s and 1970s, Taj was one of the leading wrestling clubs in Iran, competing in both freestyle and Greco-Roman wrestling.

The club won the Tehran Wrestling Clubs Championship in freestyle wrestling in 1956, 1959 and 1974, while its Greco-Roman team captured the same title in 1958, 1972, 1973 and 1974.

Following the Iranian Revolution in 1979, the wrestling department was dissolved and remained inactive for more than two decades.

=== Revival (2001–2002) ===
After more than two decades of inactivity, Esteghlal re-established its wrestling section in 2001 during the chairmanship of Ali Fathollahzadeh. The club entered teams in both freestyle and Greco-Roman wrestling for the 2001 Iranian Wrestling League season.

Both teams won their respective league championships during the season. The Greco-Roman squad included wrestlers such as Hassan Rangraz and Ali Ashkani, while the freestyle team featured Mehdi Hajizadeh and Mohammad Isa Hajiev.

The wrestling department was dissolved again in 2002.

=== Revival and runner-up finish (2020) ===
The wrestling section was revived once again in 2020 during the chairmanship of Ahmad Saadatmand. A freestyle wrestling team was established to compete in the 2020 Iranian Freestyle Wrestling Premier League.

Jahan Yaran Kohan Company was announced as the team's principal sponsor.

Esteghlal competed in Group A of the league and advanced to the final, finishing as runners-up at the end of the season.

Following the conclusion of the season, the wrestling team was once again disbanded.

==== Wrestling academy ====
In 2020, Esteghlal and the Iran Wrestling Federation reached an agreement to establish a wrestling academy in addition to the club's professional team.

The academy was planned to operate at the Tofigh Jahanbakht Wrestling Hall, located within Shahid Shiroudi Sports Complex in Tehran.

=== Revival (2025–present) ===
After several years of inactivity, Esteghlal re-established both its freestyle and Greco-Roman wrestling teams in 2025. The freestyle team was based in Juybar, Mazandaran province, while the Greco-Roman team was established in Qom. The expansion formed part of the club's strategy to develop sporting activities outside Tehran.

The freestyle team was drawn into Group B of the Iranian Freestyle Wrestling Premier League, while the Greco-Roman team competed in Group A of the Iranian Greco-Roman Wrestling Premier League.

Before the start of the season, Esteghlal strengthened its freestyle squad by signing several international wrestlers, including Ibragim Kadiev, Ahmad Idrisov and Shamil Mamedov of Russia.

The freestyle team advanced to the championship final after defeating Kheybar Khorramabad in the semi-finals. In the final, Esteghlal was defeated 6–4 by Bank Shahr and finished as runners-up in the league.

The Greco-Roman team, coached by Rouhollah Mikaeili, won the Iranian Greco-Roman Wrestling Premier League title during the same season.

== Head coaches ==
The first head coach of Esteghlal's modern wrestling team was Reza Yazdani, who was appointed in August 2020 ahead of the club's return to the Iranian Freestyle Wrestling Premier League. He guided the team to a runners-up finish before leaving the club at the end of the season.

Following the re-establishment of the wrestling section in 2025, Komeil Ghasemi was appointed head coach of the freestyle team, while Rouhollah Mikaeili took charge of the club's Greco-Roman team.

== Season-by-season record ==
=== Freestyle wrestling ===
Season-by-season record (Freestyle)
Season	Competition	Position
1951	Tehran Wrestling Clubs Championship	Runners-up
1952		
1953		
1954	Tehran Wrestling Clubs Championship	Runners-up
1955	Tehran Wrestling Clubs Championship	Runners-up
1956	Tehran Wrestling Clubs Championship	Champions
1957	Tehran Wrestling Clubs Championship	Runners-up
1958	Tehran Wrestling Clubs Championship	Runners-up
1959	Tehran Wrestling Clubs Championship	Champions
1960		
1961		
1962		
1963		
1964		
1965		
1966	Tehran Wrestling Clubs Championship	Third place
1967		
1968		
1969		
1970		
1971		
1972		
1973		
1974	Tehran Wrestling Clubs Championship	Champions
1975		
1976		
1977		
1978		
Club inactive (1979–2000)
2001	Iranian Wrestling League	Champions
2002		
Club inactive (2003–2020)
2020	Iranian Freestyle Wrestling Premier League	Runners-up
2025	Iranian Freestyle Wrestling Premier League	Runners-up

=== Greco-Roman wrestling ===
Season-by-season record (Greco-Roman)
Season	Competition	Position
1951		
1952		
1953		
1954		
1955		
1956	Tehran Wrestling Clubs Championship	Champions
1957	Tehran Wrestling Clubs Championship	Champions
1958	Tehran Wrestling Clubs Championship	Champions
1959	Tehran Wrestling Clubs Championship	Champions
1960		
1961		
1962		
1963		
1964		
1965		
1966		
1967		
1968		
1969	Tehran Wrestling Clubs Championship	Champions
1970		
1971		
1972	Tehran Wrestling Clubs Championship	Champions
1973	Tehran Wrestling Clubs Championship	Champions
1974	Tehran Wrestling Clubs Championship	Champions
1975		
1976		
1977		
1978		
Club inactive (1979–2000)
2001	Iranian Wrestling League	Champions
2002		
Club inactive (2003–2025)
2025	Iranian Greco-Roman Wrestling Premier League	Champions

== Honours ==
=== Freestyle wrestling ===
- Iranian Wrestling League
  - Champions (1): 2001
- Iranian Freestyle Wrestling Premier League
  - Runners-up (2): 2020, 2025
- Tehran Wrestling Clubs Championship
  - Champions (3): 1956, 1959, 1974
  - Runners-up (4): 1954, 1955, 1957, 1958
  - Third place (1): 1966

=== Greco-Roman wrestling ===
- Iranian Wrestling League
  - Champions (1): 2001
- Iranian Greco-Roman Wrestling Premier League
  - Champions (1): 2025
- Tehran Wrestling Clubs Championship
  - Champions (7): 1958, 1972, 1973, 1974

== Notable wrestlers ==
=== Freestyle ===
- Komeil Ghasemi
- Amirmohammad Yazdani
- Younes Emami
- Mehdi Hajizadeh
- Hassan Yazdani
- Ahmad Idrisov
- Shamil Mamedov
- Ibragim Kadiev

=== Greco-Roman ===
- Hassan Rangraz
- Alireza Nejati
- Pouya Dadmarz
- Mohammad Nagousi
- Aliakbar Yousofi
- Naser Alizadeh
- Iman Mohammadi

== See also ==
- Esteghlal F.C.
- Sport in Iran
- Wrestling in Iran
