= Jaber Sadeghzadeh =

Iranian wrestler (born 1991)

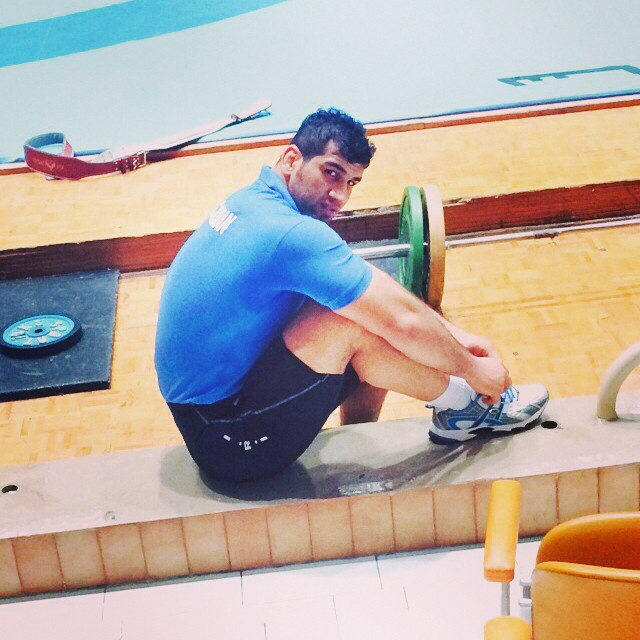

Personal information
- Native name: جابر صادق زاده
- Full name: Jaber Sadeghzadeh
- Nationality: Iranian
- Born: July 31, 1991 (age 35) Ghaemshahr, Mazandaran, Iran
- Occupation: Amateur wrestler
- Years active: 2001
- Height: 1.89 m (6 ft 2 in)
- Weight: 125 kg (276 lb)

Sport
- Country: Iran
- Sport: Wrestling
- Event: Freestyle
- Club: Vatani Ghaemshahr
- Team: National Iran
- Turned pro: 2010
- Coached by: Behnam Tayyebi
Medal record
Event	1st	2nd	3rd
U20 World Championships	1	–	–
Asian Championship	2	–	–
world cup	–	–	1
Asian Games	1	–	–
Islamic Solidarity Games	–	–	1
World Beach Championships	2	–	–
World Club Cup	–	–	1
Other	–	1	1
total	6	2	4
Representing Iran
Men's freestyle wrestling
U20 World Championships
Gold medal – first place	2011 Bucharest	120 kg
Asian Championship
Gold medal – first place	2008 Tashkent	85 kg
Gold medal – first place	2011 Jakarta	120 kg
World Cup
Bronze medal – third place	2011 Germany	Team
Asian Games
Gold medal – first place	2014 Patong	80 kg
Islamic Solidarity Games
Bronze medal – third place	2017 Baku	125 kg
World Beach Championships
Gold medal – first place	2015 Mangalia	90 kg
Gold medal – first place	2016 Fazana	90 kg
World Club Cup
Bronze medal – third place	2017 Tehran	Team
Grand Prix
Bronze medal – third place	2017 Krasnoyarsk	125 kg
Silver medal – second place	2018 Vladikavkas	125 kg

Jaber Sadeghzadeh (Persian: جابر صادق زاده; born 31 July 1991 in Ghaemshahr) is an Iranian freestyle wrestler. He won the gold medal in the 125 kg weight category at the 2011 World Junior Wrestling Championships held in Bucharest, Romania. He won the gold medal at the 2008 Asian Championships and the 2011 Asian Championships.

== Career ==
Sadeghzadeh finished third at the 2011 Men's Freestyle Wrestling World Cup in Germany
