= 2011 World Junior Wrestling Championships =

Junior Wrestling Championships

- Host city: Bucharest, Romania
- Dates: 26–31 July 2011

Champions
- Freestyle: Russia
- Greco-Roman: Georgia
- Women: Japan

The 2011 World Junior Wrestling Championships were the 36th edition of the World Junior Wrestling Championships and were held in Bucharest, Romania between 26–31 July 2011.

== Medal table ==
Rank	Nation	Gold	Silver	Bronze	Total
1	Russia	7	3	4	14
2	Japan	5	0	0	5
3	Georgia	4	4	2	10
4	Iran	2	2	2	6
5	Azerbaijan	2	0	4	6
6	Armenia	2	0	1	3
7	Bulgaria	1	1	2	4
8	Uzbekistan	1	0	1	2
9	United States	0	3	4	7
10	Ukraine	0	2	4	6
11	Kazakhstan	0	2	3	5
12	Moldova	0	2	2	4
13	Turkey	0	1	5	6
14	Poland	0	1	2	3
15	Belarus	0	1	1	2
15	Germany	0	1	1	2
17	France	0	1	0	1
17	Vietnam	0	1	0	1
19	China	0	0	4	4
20	Greece	0	0	2	2
20	India	0	0	2	2
22	Ecuador	0	0	1	1
22	Mongolia	0	0	1	1
22	Romania	0	0	1	1
Totals (24 entries)		24	25	49	98

== Medal summary ==
=== Men's freestyle ===
Event	Gold	Silver	Bronze
50 kg	Magomed Magomedaliev; Russia	Georgi Vangelov; Bulgaria	Nursultan Naizabekov; Kazakhstan
50 kg	Magomed Magomedaliev; Russia	Georgi Vangelov; Bulgaria	Anatolii Buruian; Moldova
55 kg	Vladimer Khinchegashvili; Georgia	Rassul Kaliyev; Kazakhstan	Vitaliy Hurskyy; Ukraine
55 kg	Vladimer Khinchegashvili; Georgia	Rassul Kaliyev; Kazakhstan	Arash Dangesaraki; Iran
60 kg	Toghrul Asgarov; Azerbaijan	Logan Stieber; United States	Maxim Prepelita; Moldova
60 kg	Toghrul Asgarov; Azerbaijan	Logan Stieber; United States	Ömer Uzan; Turkey
66 kg	Khetag Tsabolov; Russia	Ibrahim Nasiriaffrachali; Iran	Parveen Rana; India
66 kg	Khetag Tsabolov; Russia	Ibrahim Nasiriaffrachali; Iran	David Galegashvili; Georgia
74 kg	Tamerlan Akhmedov; Russia	Abdulkadir Özmen; Turkey	Miroslav Kirov; Bulgaria
74 kg	Tamerlan Akhmedov; Russia	Abdulkadir Özmen; Turkey	İbrahim Yusubov; Azerbaijan
84 kg	Dato Marsagishvili; Georgia	Gheorghe Rubaev; Russia	Timofei Xenidis; Greece
84 kg	Dato Marsagishvili; Georgia	Gheorghe Rubaev; Russia	Islam Azizov; Kazakhstan
96 kg	Hamed Talebizarrinkamar; Iran	Mamuka Kordzaia; Georgia	Aslanbek Alborov; Azerbaijan
96 kg	Hamed Talebizarrinkamar; Iran	Mamuka Kordzaia; Georgia	Magomedgadzhi Nurasulov; Russia
120 kg	Jaber Sadeghzadehnoukoulaei; Iran	Tedore Ebanoidze; Georgia	Muradin Kushkhov; Ukraine
120 kg	Jaber Sadeghzadehnoukoulaei; Iran	Tedore Ebanoidze; Georgia	Hamza Özkaradeniz; Turkey

=== Greco-Roman ===
Event	Gold	Silver	Bronze
50 kg	Vilayat Gahramanli; Azerbaijan	Zhanserik Sarsenbaev; Kazakhstan	Rudik Mkrtchyan; Armenia
50 kg	Vilayat Gahramanli; Azerbaijan	Zhanserik Sarsenbaev; Kazakhstan	Tolgahan Karataş; Turkey
55 kg	Narek Khachatryan; Armenia	Saman Abdevali; Iran	Eldaniz Azizli; Azerbaijan
55 kg	Narek Khachatryan; Armenia	Saman Abdevali; Iran	Elmurat Tasmuradov; Uzbekistan
60 kg	Bobur Zaylobidinov; Uzbekistan	Dawid Karecinski; Poland	Kemal Kharabadze; Georgia
60 kg	Bobur Zaylobidinov; Uzbekistan	Dawid Karecinski; Poland	Mohammad Nourbakhsh; Iran
66 kg	Chingiz Labazanov; Russia	Ion Luchita; Moldova	Ellis Coleman; United States
66 kg	Chingiz Labazanov; Russia	Ion Luchita; Moldova	Rasul Chunayev; Azerbaijan
74 kg	Rafik Manukyan; Armenia	Zurabi Datunashvili; Georgia	Michail Kornilov; Russia
74 kg	Rafik Manukyan; Armenia	Zurabi Datunashvili; Georgia	Arkadiusz Kułynycz; Poland
84 kg	Revazi Nadareishvili; Georgia	Zhan Beleniuk; Ukraine	Aslan Atem; Turkey
84 kg	Revazi Nadareishvili; Georgia	Zhan Beleniuk; Ukraine	Stanislav Kanev; Bulgaria
96 kg	Islam Magomedov; Russia	Sandro Dikhaminjia; Georgia	Xiao Di; China
96 kg	Islam Magomedov; Russia	Sandro Dikhaminjia; Georgia	Metehan Başar; Turkey
120 kg	Shota Gogisvanidze; Georgia	Kirill Grishenko; Belarus	Igor Didyk; Ukraine
120 kg	Shota Gogisvanidze; Georgia	Kirill Grishenko; Belarus	Toby Erickson; United States

=== Women's freestyle ===
Event	Gold	Silver	Bronze
44 kg	Nadezhda Fedorova; Russia	Thi Duyen Pham; Vietnam	Erin Golston; United States
44 kg	Nadezhda Fedorova; Russia	Thi Duyen Pham; Vietnam	Ritu Phogat; India
48 kg	Mika Naganuma; Japan	Tatyana Samkova; Russia	Alina Vuc; Romania
48 kg	Mika Naganuma; Japan	Tatyana Samkova; Russia	Nina Hemmer; Germany
51 kg	Mareka Shidochi; Japan	Stalvira Orshush; Russia	Luisa Valverde; Ecuador
51 kg	Mareka Shidochi; Japan	Stalvira Orshush; Russia	Ilona Omilusik; Poland
55 kg	Kanako Murata; Japan	Helen Maroulis; United States	Gui Liu; China
55 kg	Kanako Murata; Japan	Helen Maroulis; United States	Maria Prevolaraki; Greece
59 kg	Yurika Ito; Japan	Mariana Cherdivara; Moldova	Baatarzorigyn Battsetseg; Mongolia
59 kg	Yurika Ito; Japan	Mariana Cherdivara; Moldova	Valeria Koblova; Russia
63 kg	Taybe Yusein; Bulgaria	Aline Rotter-Focken; Germany	Alli Ragan; United States
63 kg	Taybe Yusein; Bulgaria	Aline Rotter-Focken; Germany	Anastasiya Huchok; Belarus
67 kg	Sara Dosho; Japan	Adeline Gray; United States	Rongrong Tao; China
67 kg	Sara Dosho; Japan	Adeline Gray; United States	Alina Berezhna; Ukraine
72 kg	Natalia Vorobieva; Russia	Cynthia Vescan; France	Zhou Feng; China
72 kg	Natalia Vorobieva; Russia	Cynthia Vescan; France	Elmira Syzdykova; Kazakhstan
