= World Wrestling Clubs Cup =

International wrestling club competition

- Status: active
- Genre: sports event
- Date: various
- Frequency: annual
- Location: various
- Inaugurated: 2014
- Most recent: 2019
- Next event: 2020
- Major events: amateur wrestling
- Patron: United World Wrestling
- Organiser: Islamic Republic of Iran Wrestling Federation

World Wrestling Clubs Cup is an international wrestling clubs competition among teams representing member nations of the United World Wrestling (UWW) the sport's global governing body. The tournament was held on the proposal of the Islamic Republic of Iran Wrestling Federation in 2014 in Iran.

== History ==
=== 2014 Cup ===
The inaugural cup was held in Juybar, Iran on November 26 to 28, 2014. The prize money for the top three teams was: $25,000 for first, $15,000 for second and $10,000 for third. A total of 15 teams competed. The Bangladesh team's participation was uncertain as the Bangladesh club Ansar did not release their wrestlers for the competition, who compromised 3 of the 8 wrestlers on the team, however the Bangladesh Amateur Wrestling Federation intervened to gain their release.

The cup was won by local Iranian club Bimeh-Razi who defeated Titan Mercury Wrestling Club (USA) in the final 6-2. Shoraye Shahr Karaj (Iran) finished third after defeating Wrestling Union (China) 7-1.

=== 2015 Cup ===
The second holding of the cup took part on November 26 and 27 2015 at the Azadi Sport Complex in Tehran, Iran. For the 2015 cup the organizers, Iran Wrestling Federation, were responsible for the provision of food, accommodation and local transport for each team, which could consist of 12 wrestlers, 2 coaches, 1 referee and 1 team leader.

The prize money on offer was increased from the previous year for the best three teams. $50,000 for first, $30,000 for second and $20,000 for third. A total of 15 teams competed in the two-day tournament.

The defending champions, Iran's Bimeh-Razi, were triumphant in the 2015 Cup for the second successive year after defeating Titan Mercury Wrestling Club (USA) in the final 7-1 that was hosted in front of a crowd of 5,000. Bimeh-Razi included the 57 kg world champion Vladimer Khinchegashvili, the 61 kg junior world champion Behnam Ehsanpour, the 65 kg world championship silver medalist Masoud Esmailpour, and the 70 kg world champion Magomedrasul Gazimagomedov. Titan Mercury Wrestling Club included the 86 kg junior world champion Mojtaba Goleij and the 96 kg 2012 Olympic Gold Medalist Jake Varner.

== Format ==
The cup involves team based dual style matches. This involves two clubs competing against each other with a single wrestler representative for each of the 8 weight divisions, Each dual is first decided by the match score, that is the club that wins the most out of the eight matches. If they are tied 4-4 then a tiebreaker is applied. The first tiebreaker is based on classification points, which are awarded for the method of victory, and the second tiebreaker, if needed, is the technical points scored during each match.

== Results ==
=== Men's freestyle ===
Year	Host city	Dates	1st	2nd	3rd	Ref
2014	(Iran) Jouybar	November 26–28	(Iran) Bimeh Razi Jouybar	(United States) Titan Mercury	(Iran) Shora Shahr Karaj	
2015	(Iran) Tehran	November 26–27	(Iran) Bimeh Razi	(United States) Titan Mercury	(Iran) Kefayati Mashhad	
2016	(Ukraine) Kharkiv	Nov. 30 – Dec. 1	(United States) Titan Mercury	(Iran) Bimeh Razi	(Ukraine) Zdorov'ya	
2017	(Iran) Tehran	December 7–8	(Iran) Easy Pipe Kashan	(United States) Titan Mercury	(Iran) Setaregan Sari	
2018	(Iran) Babol	December 13–14	(Iran) Bimeh Razi Babol	(Turkey) Ankara Tedaş	(Iran) Setaregan Sari	
2019	(Iran) Bojnourd	December 19–20	Iran-Mall	(Iran) Azad University Mazandaran	(Iran) Atrak Khorasan Shomali	
2025	(Iran) Tehran		(Iran) Bank Shahr	Turkey	(Iran) Tourism Bank	

=== Men's Greco-Roman ===
Year	Host city	Dates	1st	2nd	3rd	Ref
2014	(Iran) Abadan	December 3–5	(Iran) Jarrahi Pasteur Andimeshk	(Russia) Samurgashev	(Turkey) İstanbul Büyükşehir	
2015	(Iran) Khorramshahr	December 16–18	(Iran) Bimeh Razi	(Armenia) Dinamo	(Iran) Dokouheh Andimeshk	
2016	(Hungary) Budapest	December 8–9	(Iran) Sina Sanat Izeh	(Turkey) İstanbul Büyükşehir	(Iran) Bimeh Razi Tehran	
2017	(Iran) Isfahan	December 14–15	(Iran) Bimeh Razi Isfahan	(Iran) Sina Sanat Izeh	(Turkey) İstanbul Büyükşehir	
2018	(Iran) Ardabil	December 20–21	(Iran) Bimeh Razi Ardabil	Russia	(Iran) Sina Sanat Izeh	
2019	(Iran) Bojnourd	December 18–19	Iran-Mall	(Iran) Sina Sanat Izeh	Azerbaijan	

== See also ==
- World Wrestling Championships
- Wrestling World Cup
