= 2013 Dan Kolov & Nikola Petrov Tournament =

Dan Kolov & Nikola Petrov 2013
- Host city: Plovdiv, Bulgaria
- Dates: 15–17 February

Champions
- Freestyle: United States
- Greco-Roman: Bulgaria
- Women: Azerbaijan

The 51st Dan Kolov & Nikola Petrov Tournament was a sport wrestling event held in Plovdiv, Bulgaria between 15 and 17 February 2013.

This international tournament includes competition in both men's and women's freestyle wrestling and men's Greco-Roman wrestling. This tournament is held in honor of Dan Kolov who was the first European freestyle wrestling champion from Bulgaria and European and World Champion Nikola Petroff.

== Medal table ==
Rank	Nation	Gold	Silver	Bronze	Total
1	Bulgaria	6	4	14	24
2	Turkey	3	8	4	15
3	United States	3	1	0	4
4	Azerbaijan	3	0	2	5
5	Russia	2	0	2	4
6	Mongolia	1	2	1	4
7	North Korea	1	1	1	3
8	Moldova	1	1	0	2
9	Sweden	1	0	0	1
10	Romania	0	2	5	7
11	Poland	0	1	5	6
12	Germany	0	1	0	1
13	Brazil	0	0	3	3
14	Belarus	0	0	2	2
15	Estonia	0	0	1	1
15	France	0	0	1	1
15	Switzerland	0	0	1	1
Totals (17 entries)		21	21	42	84

== Medal overview ==
=== Men's freestyle ===
Event	Gold	Silver	Bronze
55 kg	Gyong-Il Yang; North Korea	Andrei Dukov; Romania	Mikhail Ivanov; Russia
55 kg	Gyong-Il Yang; North Korea	Andrei Dukov; Romania	Adrian Hajduk; Poland
60 kg	Vladimir Dubov; Bulgaria	Ryong Hak Hwang; North Korea	Enkhsaikhany Nyam-Ochir; Mongolia
60 kg	Vladimir Dubov; Bulgaria	Ryong Hak Hwang; North Korea	Ivan Guidea; Romania
66 kg	Servet Coşkun; Turkey	Ionut Moise; Romania	Mustafa Kaya; Turkey
66 kg	Servet Coşkun; Turkey	Ionut Moise; Romania	Anton Ivanov; Russia
74 kg	Nick Marable; United States	Batuhan Demirçin; Turkey	Ankhbayar Batchuluun; Mongolia
74 kg	Nick Marable; United States	Batuhan Demirçin; Turkey	Leonid Bazan; Bulgaria
84 kg	Jonathan Reader; United States	Namık Korkmaz; Turkey	Radosław Marcinkiewicz; Poland
84 kg	Jonathan Reader; United States	Namık Korkmaz; Turkey	Maciej Balawender; Poland
96 kg	Wynn Michalak; United States	Jake Varner; United States	Georgi Sredkov; Bulgaria
96 kg	Wynn Michalak; United States	Jake Varner; United States	Müren Mutlu; Turkey
120 kg	Dimitar Kumchev; Bulgaria	Natsagsürengiin Zolboo; Mongolia	Gyuray Hamdiev; Bulgaria
120 kg	Dimitar Kumchev; Bulgaria	Natsagsürengiin Zolboo; Mongolia	Dragomir Stoychev; Bulgaria

=== Greco-Roman ===
Event	Gold	Silver	Bronze
55 kg	Victor Ciobanu; Moldova	Aleksandar Kostadinov; Bulgaria	Nikolay Vichev; Bulgaria
55 kg	Victor Ciobanu; Moldova	Aleksandar Kostadinov; Bulgaria	Yun Won-Chol; North Korea
60 kg	Rahman Bilici; Turkey	Virgil Monteanu; Romania	Radoslav Vasilev; Bulgaria
60 kg	Rahman Bilici; Turkey	Virgil Monteanu; Romania	Ivo Angelov; Bulgaria
66 kg	Sharur Vardanyan; Sweden	Tomasz Swierk; Poland	Artak Margaryan; France
66 kg	Sharur Vardanyan; Sweden	Tomasz Swierk; Poland	Georgian Carpen; Romania
74 kg	Yavor Yanakiev; Bulgaria	Pascal Eisele; Germany	Iliyan Georgiev; Bulgaria
74 kg	Yavor Yanakiev; Bulgaria	Pascal Eisele; Germany	Jonas Bossert; Switzerland
84 kg	Hristo Marinov; Bulgaria	Ahmet Yıldırım; Turkey	Nikolay Dobrev; Bulgaria
84 kg	Hristo Marinov; Bulgaria	Ahmet Yıldırım; Turkey	Tadeusz Michalik; Poland
96 kg	Vladislav Metodiev; Bulgaria	Süleyman Demirc; Turkey	Metehan Başar; Turkey
96 kg	Vladislav Metodiev; Bulgaria	Süleyman Demirc; Turkey	Marcin Olejniczak; Poland
120 kg	Lyubomir Dimitrov; Bulgaria	Emin Öztürk; Turkey	Miloslav Metodiev; Bulgaria
120 kg	Lyubomir Dimitrov; Bulgaria	Emin Öztürk; Turkey	Heiki Nabi; Estonia

=== Women's freestyle ===
Event	Gold	Silver	Bronze
48 kg	Nadezhda Fedorova; Russia	Desislava Kancheva; Bulgaria	Sümeyya Sezer; Turkey
48 kg	Nadezhda Fedorova; Russia	Desislava Kancheva; Bulgaria	Vanesa Kaladzinskaya; Bulgaria
51 kg	Patimat Bagomedova; Azerbaijan	Burcu Kebiç; Turkey	Estera Dobre; Romania
51 kg	Patimat Bagomedova; Azerbaijan	Burcu Kebiç; Turkey	Iryna Kurachkina; Belarus
55 kg	Yarina Dubovska; Azerbaijan	Maria Esanu; Moldova	Violeta Simeonova; Bulgaria
55 kg	Yarina Dubovska; Azerbaijan	Maria Esanu; Moldova	Ana Maria Pavăl; Romania
59 kg	Irina Netreba; Azerbaijan	Mimi Hristova; Bulgaria	Joice Silva; Brazil
59 kg	Irina Netreba; Azerbaijan	Mimi Hristova; Bulgaria	Alena Kolesnik; Azerbaijan
63 kg	Buse Tosun; Turkey	Elina Vaseva; Bulgaria	Lais Oliveira; Brazil
63 kg	Buse Tosun; Turkey	Elina Vaseva; Bulgaria	Hanna Beliayeva; Azerbaijan
67 kg	Iuliia Baartnovskaia; Russia	Burcu Örskaya; Turkey	Adina Popescu; Bulgaria
67 kg	Iuliia Baartnovskaia; Russia	Burcu Örskaya; Turkey	Simon Andrea; Romania
72 kg	Ochirbatyn Burmaa; Mongolia	Yasemin Adar; Turkey	Viktoria Bobeva; Bulgaria
72 kg	Ochirbatyn Burmaa; Mongolia	Yasemin Adar; Turkey	Aline Ferreira; Brazil

== Participating nations ==
- Azerbaijan
- Brazil
- Belarus
- Bulgaria
- Estonia
- Finland
- France
- United Kingdom
- Germany
- Greece
- Macedonia
- Moldova
- Mongolia
- Poland
- Romania
- Russia
- Switzerland
- Sweden
- Turkey
- North Korea
- United States
- Sri Lanka
- Kazakhstan
- Denmark
- Portugal
