= Gerad Tehran Club =

- Full name: Gerad Tehran Club
- Short name: Gerad Tehran
- Ground: Tehran
- League: Iranian Premier Wrestling League
- 2009–10: 1st

Gerad Tehran Club is a professional wrestling team based in Tehran, Iran.

== Squad ==
As of February 2009:

| Name | Nationality |
|---|---|
| (Iran) Mohammad Rezaei | Iran |
| (Uzbekistan) Dilshod Mansurov | Uzbekistan |
| (Iran) Nasrollah Fadaei | Iran |
| (Iran) Sadegh Goudarzi | Iran |
| (Iran) Jamal Mirzaei | Iran |
| (Iran) Saeid Ebrahimi | Iran |
| (Iran) Fardin Masoumi | Iran |
| (Iran) Aliasghar Soleymani | Iran |
