= Iranian Premier Wrestling League =

- Sport: Freestyle and Greco-Roman Wrestling
- Founded: 2003
- No. of teams: 9
- Country: Iran
- Most recent champion: Saipa Tehran (2024)
- Broadcaster: IRIB TV3 IRIB Varzesh Jame Jam TV IRIB Provincial Channels
- Website: league organisation

The Iranian Premier Wrestling League is a professional wrestling league in Iran. It is the highest level of wrestling league in Iran and has been held annually since 2003.

== League champions ==
=== Freestyle ===
Season	Champion	Runner-up	Third place	Ref.
2003	PAS Tehran	Azad University Tehran	Rah Ahan Khorasan	
2004	Naft Tehran	Rah Ahan Khorasan	PAS Tehran	
2005	Naft Tehran	PAS Tehran	Jouybar Louleh Mazandaran	
2006	Azad University Tehran	Naft Tehran	Rah Ahan Khorasan	
2007	Naft Tehran	Sanaye Hamedan	Rah Ahan Khorasan	
2008	Gerad Tehran	Gaz Mazandaran	Rah Ahan Khorasan	
2009	Naft Tehran	Gaz Mazandaran	Sanaye Hamedan	
2010	Shohada Jouybar	Naft Tehran	Gaz Mazandaran	
2011	Samen Al-Hojaj Sabzevar	Khooneh-Be-Khooneh Babol	Telecabine Ganjnameh Hamedan	
2012	Samen Al-Hojaj Sabzevar	Persepolis Jouybar	Damash Sadra Babol	
2013	Samen Al-Hojaj Sabzevar	Steel Azin Tehran	Khooneh-Be-Khooneh Babol	
2014	Bimeh Razi Tehran	Gaz Mazandaran	Kefayati Mashhad	
2015	Bimeh Razi Tehran	Setaregan Sari	Kefayati Mashhad	
2016	Bimeh Razi Lorestan	Setaregan Sari	Raad Padafand Tehran	
2017	Bimeh Razi Jouybar	Easy Pipe Kashan	Setaregan Sari	
2018	Bimeh Razi Babol	Setaregan Sari	Rah & Shahrsazi Golestan	
2019	Iran-Mall Tehran	Atrak Khorasan Shomali	Azad University Mazandaran	
2020	Iran-Mall Tehran	Esteghlal Tehran	Heyat Koshti Ghaemshahr	
2021	Sanaye Mazandaran	Fooladin Zob Amol	Darousazi Sahand Aras	
2022	Petro Palayesh Bilish Takestan	Bank Shahr Mazandaran	Anbouhsazan Houtan Ghaemshahr	
2023	Bank Shahr Mazandaran	Anbouhsazan Houtan Ghaemshahr	Azad University Mazandaran	
2024	Saipa Tehran	Bank Shahr Mazandaran	Setaregan PAS Sari	
2025	Bank Shahr Mazandaran	Esteghlal Jouybar	Kheybar Khorramabad	

=== Greco-Roman ===
Season	Champion	Runner-up	Third place	Ref.
2005	Naft Ahvaz	Palayesh & Pakhsh Kermanshah	Hotel Chamran Shiraz	
2014	Jarrahi Pasteur Andimeshk	Saba Qom	Shohada Haftom Tir Tehran	
2015	Bimeh Razi Tehran	Sina Sanat Izeh	Padideh Dokouheh Andimeshk	
2016	Bimeh Razi Lorestan	Sina Sanat Izeh	Modafeein Haram Andimeshk	
2017	Bimeh Razi Tehran	Sina Sanat Izeh	Shohada Modafe Haram Qom	
2018	Bimeh Razi Ardabil	Sina Sanat Izeh	Shohada Modafe Haram Qom	
2019	Iran-Mall Tehran	Sina Sanat Izeh	Heyat Koshti Sirjan	
2020	Iran-Mall Tehran	Azad University Tehran	Sina Sanat Izeh	
2021	Fooladin Zob Amol	Sina Sanat Izeh	Andishehnegar Pars Lorestan	
2022	Foolad Sepahan Isfahan	Foolad Khuzestan	Azad University Qom	
2023	Gorouh Melli Foolad Ahvaz	Naft & Gaz Zagros	Azad University Qom	
2024	Shahrdari Masjed Soleyman	Naft & Gaz Zagros	Alinous Eslamshahr	
2025	Esteghlal Qom	Naft & Gaz Zagros	Raad Padafand Tehran; Azad University Khuzestan	

== See also ==
- Wrestling in Iran
