= 2017 World Wrestling Clubs Cup – Men's Greco-Roman =

2017 World Wrestling Clubs Cup
- Host city: Isfahan, Iran
- Dates: December 14–15, 2017

Champions

The 2017 World Wrestling Clubs Cup – Men's Greco-Roman was the last of a set of two World Wrestling Clubs Cups in 2017 which were held in Isfahan, Iran on 14–15 December 2017.

== Pool stage ==
Team competes for Semifinals
Team competes for 5th-8th place
Team competes for 9th-12th place

=== Pool A ===
Team	Pld	W	L
(Iran) Sina Sanat Izeh	3	3	0
(Armenia) Dinamo	3	2	1
(Romania) Olympic Hopes	3	1	2
(Greece) P.A.O.K.	3	0	3

POOL A
Round I

(Iran) Sina Sanat Izeh 8 - 2 (Romania) Olympic Hopes

(Armenia) Dinamo 9 - 1 (Greece) P.A.O.K.

Round II

(Iran) Sina Sanat Izeh 6 - 4 (Armenia) Dinamo

(Romania) Olympic Hopes 7 - 3 (Greece) P.A.O.K.

Round III

(Iran) Sina Sanat Izeh 10 - 0 (Greece) P.A.O.K.

(Romania) Olympic Hopes 8 - 2 (Armenia) Dinamo

=== Pool B ===
Team	Pld	W	L
(Georgia (country)) Georgian Club	2	2	0
(Iran) Modafe Haram Qom	2	1	1
(Tajikistan) Tajik Air	2	0	2

POOL B
Round I

(Georgia (country)) Georgian Club 8 - 2 (Iran) Modafe Haram Qom

Round II

(Tajikistan) Tajik Air 1 - 9 (Georgia (country)) Georgian Club

Round III

(Iran) Modafe Haram Qom 7 - 3 (Tajikistan) Tajik Air

=== Pool C ===
Team	Pld	W	L
(Turkey) İstanbul Büyükşehir	2	2	0
(Ukraine) Samsun	2	1	1
(Hungary) Budapest SC	2	0	2

POOL C
Round I

(Turkey) İstanbul Büyükşehir 6 - 4 (Ukraine) Samsun

Round II

(Hungary) Budapest SC 0 - 10 (Turkey) İstanbul Büyükşehir

Round III

(Ukraine) Samsun 8 - 2 (Hungary) Budapest SC

=== Pool D ===
Team	Pld	W	L
(Iran) Bimeh Razi	2	2	0
(Russia) Moscow	2	1	1
(Kyrgyzstan) Physical Academy	2	0	2

POOL D
Round I

(Iran) Bimeh Razi 10 - 0 (Russia) Moscow

Round II

(Kyrgyzstan) Physical Academy 0 - 10 (Iran) Bimeh Razi

Round III

(Russia) Moscow 9 - 1 (Kyrgyzstan) Physical Academy

== Next level ==
Semi final
Semi final

(Iran) Sina Sanat Izeh 7- 3 (Georgia (country)) Georgian Club

(Turkey) İstanbul Büyükşehir 2 - 8 (Iran) Bimeh Razi

Classification 2nd places

(Armenia) Dinamo 4 - 6 (Iran) Modafe Haram Qom

(Ukraine) Samsun 4 - 6 (Russia) Moscow

Classification 3rd places

(Romania) Olympic Hopes 8 - 2 (Tajikistan) Tajik Air

(Hungary) Budapest SC 6 - 4 (Kyrgyzstan) Physical Academy

Final
Final 1-2

(Iran) Sina Sanat Izeh 2 - 8 (Iran) Bimeh Razi

Final 3-4

(Georgia (country)) Georgian Club 4 - 6 (Turkey) İstanbul Büyükşehir

Final 5-6

(Iran) Modafe Haram Qom 8 - 2 (Russia) Moscow

Final 7-8

(Armenia) Dinamo 6 - 4 (Ukraine) Samsun

Final 9-10

(Romania) Olympic Hopes 5 - 4 (Hungary) Budapest SC

Final 11-12

(Tajikistan) Tajik Air 3 - 5 (Kyrgyzstan) Physical Academy

== Final ranking ==
Rank	Team	Pld	W	L
1	(Iran) Bimeh Razi	4	4	0
2	(Iran) Sina Sanat Izeh	4	3	1
3	(Turkey) İstanbul Büyükşehir	4	3	1
4	(Georgia (country)) Georgian Club	4	2	2
5	(Iran) Modafe Haram Qom	4	3	1
6	(Russia) Moscow	4	2	2
7	(Armenia) Dinamo	4	2	2
8	(Ukraine) Samsun	4	1	3
9	(Romania) Olympic Hopes	4	2	2
10	(Hungary) Budapest SC	4	1	3

== See also ==
- 2017 Wrestling World Cup - Men's Greco-Roman
- 2017 Wrestling World Cup - Men's freestyle
