= 2014 World Wrestling Championships – Men's freestyle 61 kg =

World Wrestling competition

Men's freestyle 61 kg at the 2014 World Championships
- Venue: Gymnastics Sport Palace
- Dates: 9 September 2014
- Competitors: 27 from 27 nations

Medalists
gold medal	Haji Aliyev	Azerbaijan
silver medal	Masoud Esmaeilpour	Iran
bronze medal	Enkhsaikhany Nyam-Ochir	Mongolia
bronze medal	Yowlys Bonne	Cuba

The men's freestyle 61 kilograms is a competition featured at the 2014 World Wrestling Championships, and was held in Tashkent, Uzbekistan on 9 September 2014.

This freestyle wrestling competition consisted of a single-elimination tournament, with a repechage used to determine the winners of two bronze medals.

== Results ==
Legend

- F — Won by fall
- WO — Won by walkover

=== Final ===
Final
Masoud Esmaeilpour (IRI)	7
Haji Aliyev (AZE)	12

=== Top half ===
Round of 32
Masakazu Kamoi (JPN)	3
Vladimir Dubov (BUL)	6
Masoud Esmaeilpour (IRI)	6
Mykola Bolotňuk (SVK)	4
Enkhsaikhany Nyam-Ochir (MGL)	3
Yang Jae-hoon (KOR)	2

Round of 16
Kim Kuk-gwang (PRK)	1
Artas Sanaa (KAZ)	3
Münir Recep Aktaş (TUR)	7
Hayot Sayfullaev (UZB)	3
Jasin Redjalari (MKD)	4
Vladimir Dubov (BUL)	14
Masoud Esmaeilpour (IRI)	7
Enkhsaikhany Nyam-Ochir (MGL)	0

Quarterfinals
Artas Sanaa (KAZ)	6
Münir Recep Aktaş (TUR)	2
Vladimir Dubov (BUL)	1
Masoud Esmaeilpour (IRI)	12

Semifinals
Artas Sanaa (KAZ)	0
Masoud Esmaeilpour (IRI)	10

=== Bottom half ===
Round of 32
Andrei Prepeliţă (MDA)	15
Adilet Mamataev (KGZ)	5
Hamka (INA)	0
Jimmy Kennedy (USA)	10
Heorhi Kaliyeu (BLR)	1
Krzysztof Bieńkowski (POL)	2
Haji Aliyev (AZE)	14
Vasyl Shuptar (UKR)	2
Beka Lomtadze (GEO)	10
Ramil Rejepow (TKM)	0
Valodya Frangulyan (ARM)	0
Aleksandr Bogomoev (RUS)	5
Ivan Guidea (ROU)	5
Rahul Mann (IND)	8
Jean Bernard Diatta (SEN)	0
Yowlys Bonne (CUB)	4^{F}

Round of 16
Andrei Prepeliţă (MDA)	6
Jimmy Kennedy (USA)	4
Krzysztof Bieńkowski (POL)	0
Haji Aliyev (AZE)	10
Beka Lomtadze (GEO)	3
Aleksandr Bogomoev (RUS)	13
Rahul Mann (IND)	0
Yowlys Bonne (CUB)	10

Quarterfinals
Andrei Prepeliţă (MDA)	0
Haji Aliyev (AZE)	11
Aleksandr Bogomoev (RUS)	0
Yowlys Bonne (CUB)	10

Semifinals
Haji Aliyev (AZE)	4
Yowlys Bonne (CUB)	2

=== Repechage ===
Repechage round 1
Mykola Bolotňuk (SVK)	1
Enkhsaikhany Nyam-Ochir (MGL)	7
Vasyl Shuptar (UKR)
Krzysztof Bieńkowski (POL)	WO

Repechage round 2
Enkhsaikhany Nyam-Ochir (MGL)	7
Vladimir Dubov (BUL)	5
Krzysztof Bieńkowski (POL)	0
Andrei Prepeliţă (MDA)	3

Bronze medals
Enkhsaikhany Nyam-Ochir (MGL)	2
Artas Sanaa (KAZ)	1
Andrei Prepeliţă (MDA)	2
Yowlys Bonne (CUB)	8
