= 2009 Yasar Dogu Tournament =

Yasar Dogu 2009
- Host city: Ankara, Turkey
- Dates: 7–8 February
- Stadium: Ataturk Sports Complex

The Yasar Dogu Tournament 2009, was a wrestling event held in Ankara, Turkey between 7 and 8 February 2009. This tournament was held as 37th.

This international tournament includes competition includes competition in both men's and women's freestyle wrestling. This ranking tournament was held in honor of the two time Olympic Champion, Yaşar Doğu.

== Medal table ==
Rank	Nation	Gold	Silver	Bronze	Total
1	Turkey	4	4	8	16
2	Japan	2	1	0	3
3	Azerbaijan	1	1	2	4
4	Georgia	0	1	0	1
5	Canada	0	0	2	2
5	Mongolia	0	0	2	2
Totals (6 entries)		7	7	14	28

== Medal overview ==
=== Men's freestyle ===
Event	Gold	Silver	Bronze
55 kg	Shin'ichi Yumoto; Japan	Yasuhiro Inaba; Japan	Bayaraagiin Naranbaatar; Mongolia
55 kg	Shin'ichi Yumoto; Japan	Yasuhiro Inaba; Japan	John Pineda; Canada
60 kg	Ersin Çetin; Turkey	Malkhaz Zarkua; Georgia	Erhan Bakır; Turkey
60 kg	Ersin Çetin; Turkey	Malkhaz Zarkua; Georgia	Enkhsaikhany Nyam-Ochir; Mongolia
66 kg	Jananitsu Fatsutiro; Japan	Okay Köksal; Turkey	Cebrail Hasanov; Azerbaijan
66 kg	Jananitsu Fatsutiro; Japan	Okay Köksal; Turkey	Haislan Garcia; Canada
74 kg	Fırat Binici; Turkey	Ahmet Gülhan; Turkey	Batuhan Demirci; Turkey
74 kg	Fırat Binici; Turkey	Ahmet Gülhan; Turkey	Serdal Çatal; Turkey
84 kg	Gökhan Yavaşer; Turkey	Navzud Temrezov; Azerbaijan	Faruk Kalender; Turkey
84 kg	Gökhan Yavaşer; Turkey	Navzud Temrezov; Azerbaijan	Ali İmamoğlu; Turkey
96 kg	Khetag Gazyumov; Azerbaijan	Serhat Balcı; Turkey	Yasin Kılıç; Turkey
96 kg	Khetag Gazyumov; Azerbaijan	Serhat Balcı; Turkey	Rıza Yıldırım; Turkey
120 kg	Recep Kara; Turkey	Mehmet Yeşil Yeşil; Turkey	Ali Gürbüz; Turkey
120 kg	Recep Kara; Turkey	Mehmet Yeşil Yeşil; Turkey	Mikhail Gazaev; Azerbaijan

== Participating nations ==
- Azerbaijan
- Canada
- Mongolia
- Turkey
- Japan
- Georgia
