= Enkhsaikhany Nyam-Ochir =

Mongolian wrestler

Personal information
- Native name: Энхсайханий Ням-Очир
- Nationality: Mongolia
- Born: 10 March 1985 (age 41) Ulaanbaatar, Mongolia
- Height: 170 cm (5 ft 7 in)

Sport
- Country: Mongolia
- Sport: Wrestling
- Weight class: 61 kg
- Event: Freestyle

Achievements and titles
- World finals: (bronze) (2014)
- Regional finals: (bronze) (2007)
Medal record
Men's freestyle wrestling
Representing Mongolia
World Championships
Bronze medal – third place	2014 Tashkent	61 kg
Asian Championships
Bronze medal – third place	2007 Bishkek	55 kg
Yasar Dogu Tournament
Silver medal – second place	2014 Istanbul	61 kg
Silver medal – second place	2013 Ankara	60 kg
Bronze medal – third place	2009 Ankara	60 kg
Dan Kolov & Nikola Petrov Tournament
Silver medal – second place	2010 Burgas	60 kg
Bronze medal – third place	2013 Plovdiv	60 kg

Enkhsaikhany Nyam-Ochir (Mongolian: Энхсайханы Ням-Очир; born 10 March 1985) is a Mongolian male wrestler. Bronze Medalist World Wrestling Championships 2014.
