= Wrestling in Iran =

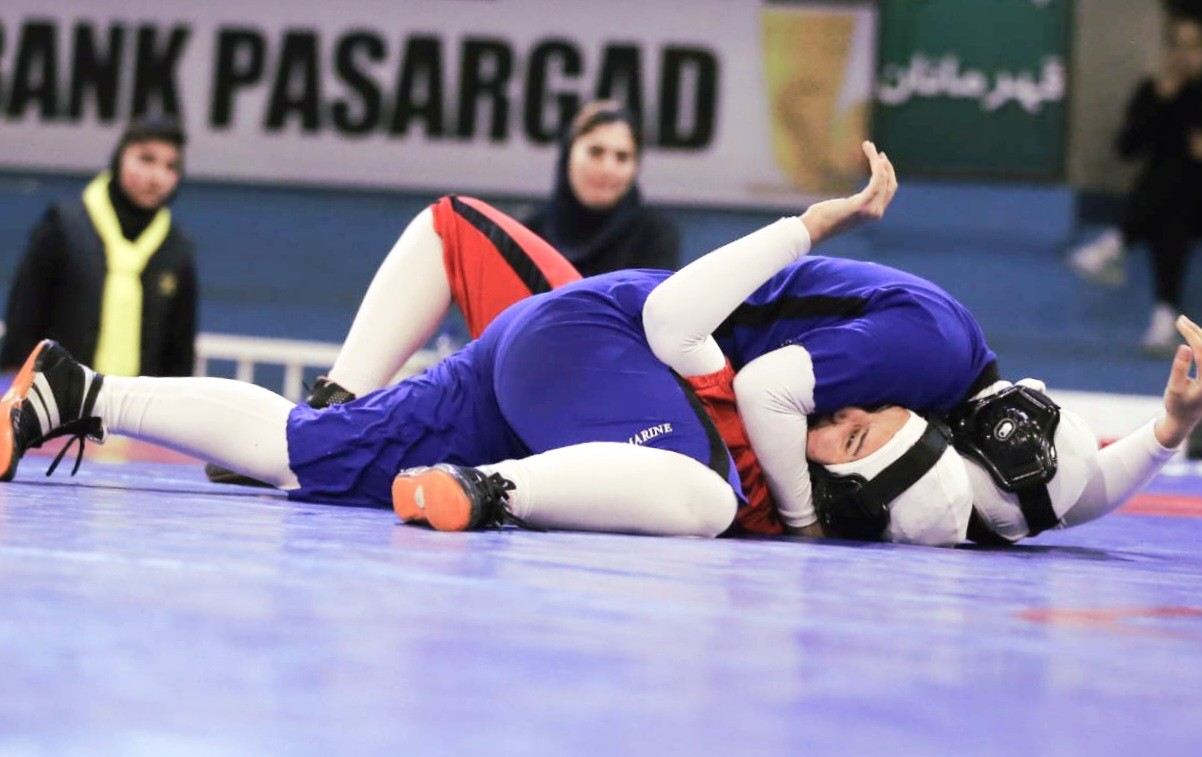
Iranian women's wrestling competitions are held with specially designed singlet.

Iranian wrestling or Koshti (Persian: کشتی, romanized: koshti) is a martial art and combat sport that has been practiced since ancient times in Iran. A form today is koshti pahlavani practiced in the zurkhaneh.

While regional variations differ from one province to another, Olympic freestyle wrestling is often referred to as the “first sport” of Iran. Iran’s freestyle team has been world champions seven times: in 1961, 1965, 1998, 2002, 2013, 2015, and 2025. Iran’s team in Greco-Roman wrestling were world champions in 2014 and 2025 and 2026. Women’s wrestling is less popular in Iran, but Iranian women wrestlers have international and domestic records and honors. Iran has won 55 Olympic medals for wrestling.

In Iran, women's wrestling is banned unless athletes wear the hijab, restricting their ability to participate in international competitions sanctioned by United World Wrestling. This regulation has led to significant challenges for female wrestlers, who often face barriers to competing and showcasing their talents on a global stage.

== History ==
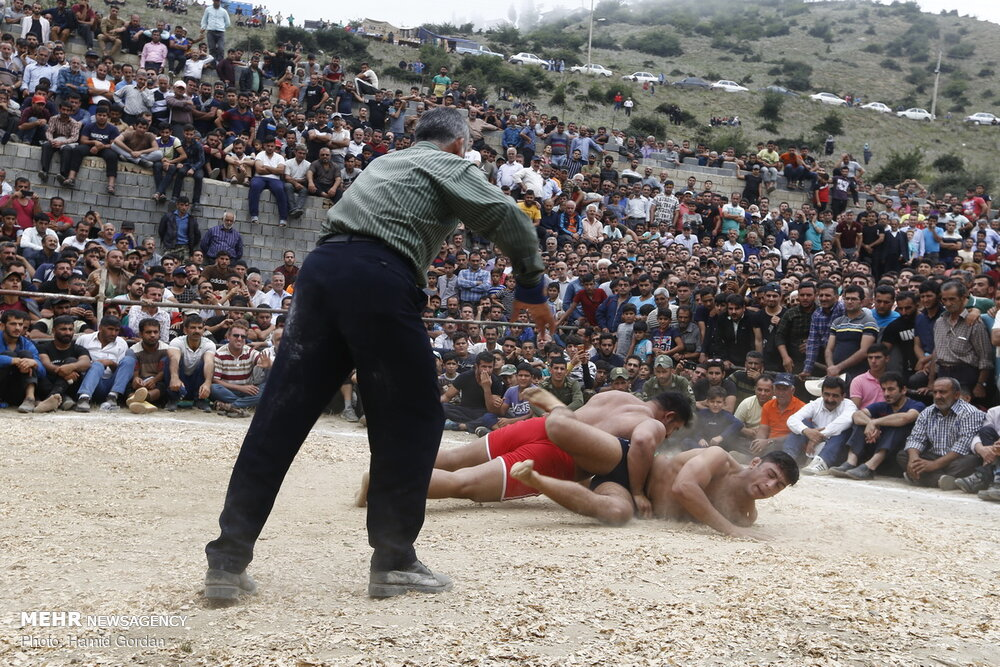
Locho pahlevani wrestling, with a history dating back over a thousand years ago, is a traditional sport of Mazandaran province.

The history of wrestling in Iran, like weightlifting, can be traced to the ancient Persian sport of Varzesh-e-Bastani, which translates to "ancient sport."

This practice has survived into the modern era through various attempts to downplay the pre-Islamic roots of the country. It made the transition from the Pahlavi shah's efforts to modernise the country and through the transition of the 1979 revolution.

== Interactions with the U.S. ==
After the election of Mohammad Khatami as president in 1997, he considered wrestling as a possible way to reopen diplomatic relations between Iran and U.S., after nearly two decades. This was an Iranian take on Nixon-era "ping pong" diplomacy with China.

In Feb. 2017 Iran planned on denying visas to U.S. wrestlers for the Freestyle World Cup. This was done in response to President Trump's travel ban to seven Muslim majority countries. The decision to bar U.S. participants was eventually overturned by Iranian officials after a U.S. federal judge temporarily blocked Trump's ban on Iranians traveling to the U.S.

== Professional wrestling ==
One professional wrestling promotion that operates in Iran is the Iran Wrestling Group (IWG). The promotion was founded in 2009. They have run shows including "IWG First War" and "IWG Lord of the Ring."

Professional wrestler Hossein Khosrow Ali Vaziri, originally from Damghan, Iran, may have been born on March 14, 1942, but celebrated his birthday on September 9.

== Women's wrestling ==
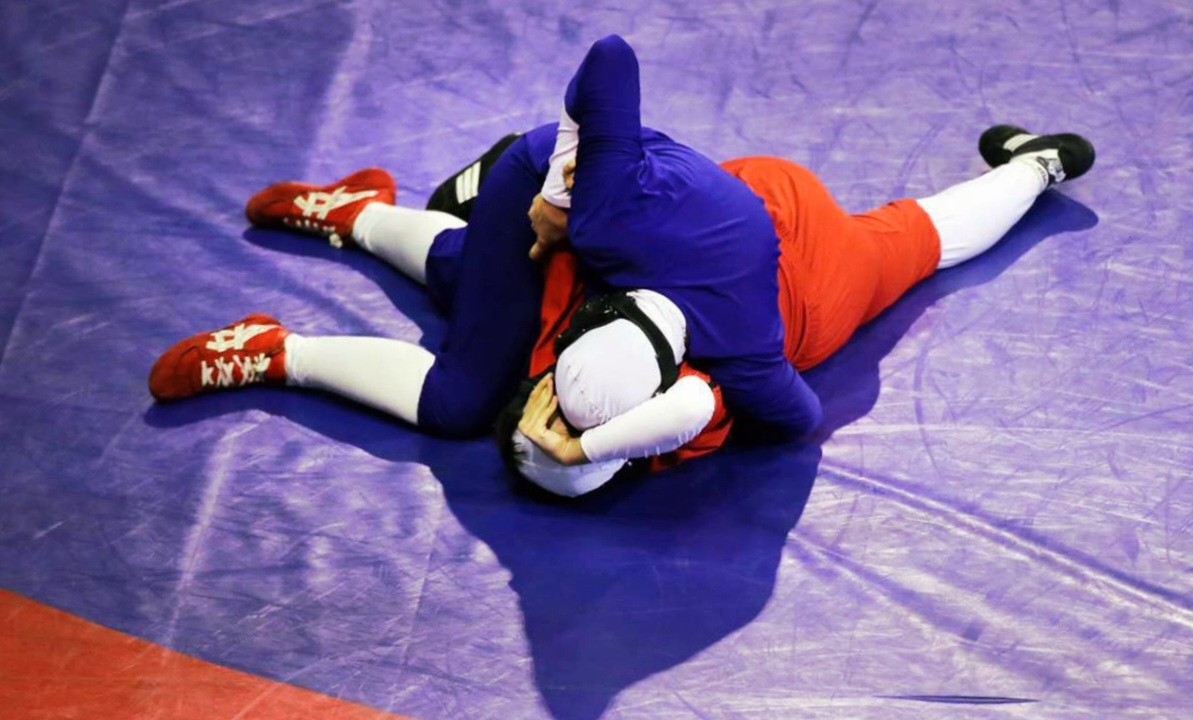
Iranian women's wrestling matches.

After the 1979 revolution, Iranian women's wrestling, although faced with limitations, was able to achieve domestic and international achievements. However, it has more financial problems than men's wrestling.

== Notable styles of Iranian wrestling ==
Wrestling is the first sport in Iran and Iranians have the highest Olympic medal for wrestling. in Iran two notable styles are for wrestling:

- Koshti Pahlavani, literally "heroic wrestling" (practiced throughout Iran)
- Tourkamani style or Kurash (Golestan province)

== Notable Iranian Wrestlers ==
- Gholamreza Takhti
- Abdollah Movahed
- Emam-Ali Habibi
- Mansour Barzegar
- Mohammad Ali Sanatkaran
- Tofigh Jahanbakht
- Firouz Alizadeh
- Abbas Zandi
- Mohammad Ali Fardin
- Shamseddin Seyed-Abbasi
- Mohsen Farahvashi
- Abutaleb Talebi
- Ebrahim Javadi
- Ebrahim Seifpour
- Mansour Mehdizadeh
- Alireza Soleimani
- Reza Soukhtehsaraei
- Askari Mohammadian
- Rasoul Khadem
- Amir Reza Khadem
- Abbas Jadidi
- Alireza Dabir
- Alireza Heidari
- Rahim Aliabadi
- Morad Mohammadi
- Reza Yazdani
- Hassan Rahimi
- Hamid Sourian
- Ghasem Rezaei
- Omid Norouzi
- Komeil Ghasemi
- Hassan Yazdani
- Amir Hossein Zare
- Mohammad Reza Geraei
- Mohammad Hadi Saravi
- Saeid Esmaeili
- Amin Mirzazadeh
- Gholamreza Farrokhi

== See also ==
- Iranian Premier Wrestling League
- Indian clubs
- Köräş
- Pahlavani
- Pankration
- Pehlwani
- Sambo
- Yağlı güreş
