= Lais Oliveira =

Brazilian model

Lais Oliveira Navarro (born August 11, 1989), is a Brazilian model best known for walking the Victoria's Secret Fashion Show 2016 and being exclusive for the Louis Vuitton.

== Life ==
Oliveira was born in Sao Paulo in 1989.

== Career ==
At the age of 13, she was discovered by an agent while attending the Sao Paulo Fashion Week fashion shows with her mother. She worked locally as a model before starting her international career at the Spring 2007 New York Fashion Week, walking for Alexander Wang's first presentation and Phillip Lim's first fashion show. Since then, she has landed ads for brands such as H&M and J.Crew which caused Vogue to say that "her face is well known, even if her name isn't yet".

She walked the Victoria's Secret Fashion Show 2016, making her one of the Brazilian models to watch in 2017 according to Vogue. In March 2017, she walked the Louis Vuitton runway as an exclusive.
