= 2014 FILA Wrestling World Cup – Women's freestyle =

The 2014 FILA Wrestling World Cup - Women's freestyle was the second of a set of three FILA Wrestling World Cups in 2014 - one for each major discipline. The event took place in Tokyo, Japan on March 15 and 16, 2014.

== Final standings ==
1. Japan
2. Russia
3. China
4. Canada
5. Mongolia
6. United States
7. Hungary
8. Ukraine

== See also ==
- 2014 FILA Wrestling World Cup - Men's freestyle
- 2014 FILA Wrestling World Cup - Men's Greco-Roman
