= Jimmy Kennedy (wrestler) =

American wrestler (born 1988)

Personal information
- Born: July 7, 1988 (age 38) Ingleside, Illinois, U.S.

Sport
- Country: United States
- Sport: Wrestling
- Events: Freestyle and Folkstyle
- College team: Illinois
- Team: USA

Jimmy Kennedy (born July 7, 1988) is an American former wrestler for New York Athletic Club, who represented the United States at the 2014 World Wrestling Championships in freestyle wrestling.

== High school ==
Kennedy attended Grant Community High School in Fox Lake, Illinois from 2002 to 2006. Kennedy was a four time place winner in the Illinois state tournament, winning state titles in 2004 and 2006, and finishing top 3 every year. Kennedy finished his high school career with a 187–3 record (98.4% winning percentage), and won the Dave Schultz High School Excellence Award in 2006 as the best high school wrestler in Illinois.

== College ==
As a collegiate wrestler at Illinois, Kennedy was a four-time NCAA qualifier and three-time NCAA All-American. At the NCAA Division I Wrestling Championships, he was fourth in 2008 and fifth in both 2009 and 2011. Kennedy finished his college career with a 119–24 record, for a winning percentage of 83%.

== Senior level ==
Kennedy represented the United States at the 2014 World Championships in freestyle wrestling, finishing 1–1 and in 10th place at 61 kg.

Kennedy also represented the United States at the 2012 University World Championships, where he went 1–1 and finished in 7th place at 60 kg.
