= Islamic Republic of Iran Wrestling Federation =

Sports governing body

- Abbreviation: IAWF
- Type: Sports organization
- Location: Tehran, Iran
- Official language: Persian
- President: Alireza Dabir
- Affiliations: UWW
- Website: en.iawf.ir

The Islamic Republic of Iran Wrestling Federation is the governing body for Wrestling in Iran. It is a member of the United World Wrestling (UWW).
