= 2018 World Wrestling Clubs Cup – Men's freestyle =

2018 World Wrestling Clubs Cup
- Host city: Babol, Iran
- Dates: December 7–8, 2018

Champions

The 2018 World Wrestling Clubs Cup – Men's freestyle were held in Babol, Iran on 7–8 December 2018.

== Pool stage ==
Team competes for 1st place
Team competes for 3rd place
Team competes for 5th place

=== Pool A ===
Team	Pld	W	L
(Iran) Bimeh Razi	3	3	0
(Iran) Setaregan Sari	3	2	1
Ukraine	3	1	2
Hungary	3	0	3

POOL A
Round I

(Iran) Setaregan Sari 10 - 0 Hungary

Ukraine 1 - 9 (Iran) Bimeh Razi

Round II

(Iran) Setaregan Sari 7 - 3 Ukraine

Hungary 0 - 10 (Iran) Bimeh Razi

Round III

(Iran) Setaregan Sari 1 - 9 (Iran) Bimeh Razi

Hungary 2 - 8 Ukraine

=== Pool B ===
Team	Pld	W	L
Turkey	3	3	0
(Georgia (country)) Raindi	3	2	1
Kyrgyzstan	3	1	2
India	3	0	3

POOL B
Round I

Kyrgyzstan 1 - 9 (Georgia (country)) Raindi

India 4 - 6 Turkey

Round II

Kyrgyzstan 5.df - 5 India

(Georgia (country)) Raindi 2 - 8 Turkey

Round III

Kyrgyzstan 4 - 6 Turkey

(Georgia (country)) Raindi 5.df - 5 India

== Final ==
Final
Final 1-2

(Iran) Bimeh Razi 10 - 0 Turkey

Final 3-4

(Iran) Setaregan Sari 9 - 1 (Georgia (country)) Raindi

Final 5-6

Ukraine 8 - 2 Kyrgyzstan

Final 7-8

Hungary 3 - 7 India

== Final ranking ==
Rank	Team	Pld	W	L
1	(Iran) Bimeh Razi	4	4	0
2	Turkey	4	3	1
3	(Iran) Setaregan Sari	4	3	1
4	(Georgia (country)) Raindi	4	2	2
5	Ukraine	4	3	1
6	Kyrgyzstan	4	2	2
7	India	4	2	2
8	Hungary	4	1	3

== See also ==
- 2018 Wrestling World Cup - Men's Greco-Roman
- 2018 Wrestling World Cup - Men's freestyle
