= Parveen Rana =

Indian freestyle wrestler

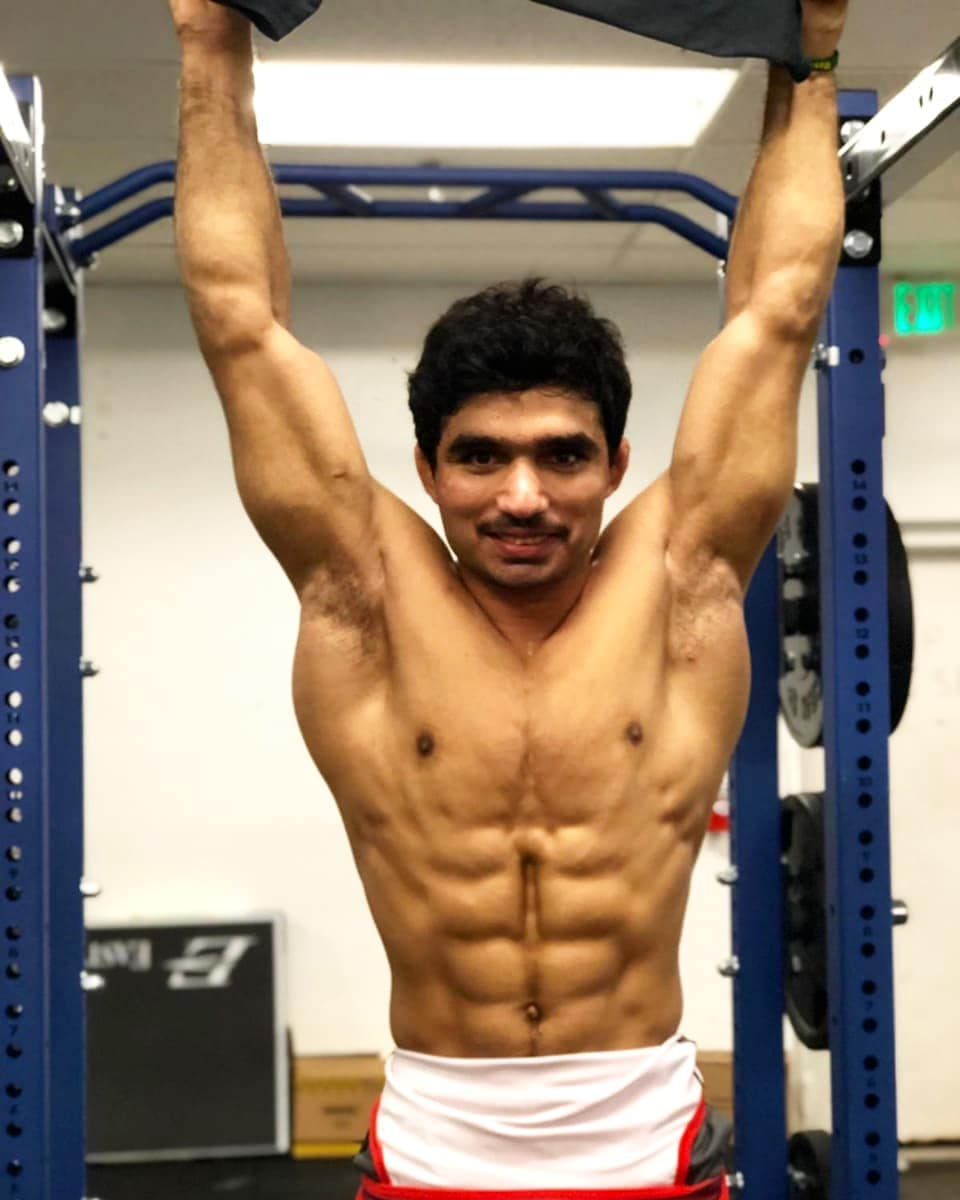
- Rana during a training session in 2019

Personal information
- Nationality: Indian
- Citizenship: Indian
- Born: 12 November 1992 (age 34) Delhi
- Occupation: Wrestler
- Height: 5 ft 7 in (170 cm)
- Weight: 74 kg (163 lb)

Sport
- Country: India
- Sport: Wrestling
- Event: Freestyle
Medal record
Representing India
Men's Freestyle Wrestling
Asian Wrestling Championship
Bronze medal – third place	2012 Gumi
Silver medal – second place	2019 Xi'an
Cadet Asian Wrestling Championship
Gold medal – first place	2008 Tashkent, Uzbekistan
Commonwealth Youth Games
Gold medal – first place	2008 Pune, India
Commonwealth Wrestling Championship
Gold medal – first place	2013 Johannesburg	74 kg
Bronze medal – third place	2017 Johannesburg	74 kg Freestyle
Dave Schultz Memorial
Gold medal – first place	2014 USA

Parveen Rana (born 12 November 1992) is an Indian freestyle wrestler. He gained recognition after winning a gold medal at the Youth Commonwealth Games in 2008. In 2019, he won the silver medal in the men's 79 kg event at the 2019 Asian Wrestling Championships held in Xi'an, China.

== Early life ==
Parveen, son of Udaybhan Rana and Rajbala, was born in the village of Qutubgarh, Delhi. His father identified his skills at an early age. He started wrestling at the age of five, under the guidance of his elder brother.

He currently trains in Philadelphia in United States under the guidance of Olympian medalist Yogeshwar Dutt. Yogeshwar Dutt is role model of Parveen Rana. His wrestling relies primarily on swift counter-attacks.

== Wrestling career ==
Rana first gained international attention when he won a gold medal at the 3rd Youth Commonwealth Games in 2008. He went on to win a bronze medal in the 2011 Junior Wrestling World Championship in Bucharest, followed by the 66 kg freestyle title at the 2012 Hari Ram Indian Grand Prix Wrestling Championships, when he was 20 years old. In 2013, he won gold medals at the Senior National Wrestling Championship in Kolkata and the Commonwealth Wrestling Championship in Johannesburg.

In June 2014, Rana sustained a career-threatening neck injury, but made a remarkable comeback to win the gold medal at the Senior National Games and represent India in the 70 kg category at the 2014 Asian Games. The following year, he was the first Indian male wrestler acquired by the Punjab Royals franchise of the Pro Wrestling League.

Rana was chosen to represent India at the 2016 Summer Olympics in Rio de Janeiro after the earlier qualifier, Narsingh Pancham, failed a doping test. However, the decision was reversed after Pancham was cleared by the National Anti-Doping Agency.

== Achievements ==
- Silver medal, Asian Wrestling Championship, Xian, China, 2019
- Silver medal, Commonwealth Wrestling Championship, Johannesburg, South Africa, 2017
- Gold medal, Commonwealth Wrestling Championship, Johannesburg, 2013
- Gold medal, Dave Schultz Memorial, United States, 2014
- Gold medal, Senior Nationals, Kolkata 2013
- Gold medal, 1st Hari Ram Indian Grand Prix Tournament, New Delhi, 2012
- Bronze medal, Junior Asian Wrestling Championship, Almaty, 2012
- Bronze medal, Asian Senior Wrestling Championship, Korea, 2012
- Bronze medal, Dave Schultz Memorial International, USA, 2012
- Bronze medal, Junior Wrestling World Championship, Bucharest, 2011
- Silver medal, 55th Senior National Wrestling Championship, Ranchi, 2010
- Gold medal, Cadet Asian Wrestling Championship, Tashkent, 2008
- Gold medal, 3rd Commonwealth Youth Games, Pune, 2008
