= Wrestling World Cup =

- Status: Active
- Genre: Sports event
- Date: Various
- Frequency: Annual
- Location: Various
- Inaugurated: 1973
- Organiser: United World Wrestling
- People: Joe Scalzo

Wrestling World Cup is an international wrestling competition among teams representing member nations of the United World Wrestling (UWW) the sport's global governing body. The cups have been conducted by FILA (the UWW predecessor) every year since the 1973 tournament. The World Cup began as a dual-meet competition for the top teams on each continent, but now features the top teams in the rankings of the previous year's world championships.

Two individual competitions under the same name were held in 1956 and 1958 before establishing the current World Cup competition in 1973. Besides that, the UWW had another competition called the Individual World Cup as a replacement event for the 2020 World Cup Championships.

== Competitions ==
=== Men's freestyle ===
Year	Host city	Dates	1st	2nd	3rd	Ref
1973	(United States) Toledo	May 19–20	Soviet Union	United States	Japan	
1974	(Spain) Las Palmas	July 20–21	Soviet Union	Iran	Bulgaria	
1975	(United States) Toledo	March 29–30	Soviet Union	Mongolia	United States	
1976	(United States) Toledo	Feb. 29 – Mar. 1	Soviet Union	Iran	United States	
1977	(United States) Toledo	March 26–27	Soviet Union	United States	Japan	
1978	(United States) Toledo	April 1–2	Soviet Union	United States	Japan	
1979	(United States) Toledo	Mar. 31 – Apr. 1	Soviet Union	United States	Japan	
1980	(United States) Toledo	March 29–30	United States	Soviet Union	Canada	
1981	(United States) Toledo	March 28–29	Soviet Union	United States	Mongolia	
1982	(United States) Toledo	March 27–28	United States	Soviet Union	Canada	
1983	(United States) Toledo	March 26–27	Soviet Union	United States	Canada	
1984	(United States) Toledo	Mar. 31 – Apr. 1	Soviet Union	United States	Bulgaria	
1985	(United States) Toledo	March 30–31	Soviet Union	United States	Japan	
1986	(United States) Toledo	March 22–23	Soviet Union	United States	Cuba	
1987	(Mongolia) Ulaanbaatar	November 28–29	Soviet Union	Mongolia	United States	
1988	(United States) Toledo	March 26–27	Soviet Union	United States	Cuba	
1989	(United States) Toledo	April 1–2	Soviet Union	United States	Cuba	
1990	(United States) Toledo	Mar. 31 – Apr. 1	United States	Soviet Union	Cuba	
1991	(United States) Toledo	April 6–7	United States	Soviet Union	South Korea	
1992	(Russia) Moscow	November 14–15	Russia	Iran	United States	
1993	(United States) Chattanooga	April 2–3	United States	Russia	Canada	
1994	(Canada) Edmonton	March 25–26	United States	Iran	Russia	
1995	(United States) Chattanooga	April 7–8	United States	Russia	Turkey	
1996	(Iran) Tehran	November 7–8	Iran	Cuba	Russia	
1997	(United States) Stillwater	April 4–5	United States	Russia	Cuba	
1998	(United States) Stillwater	April 4–5	Russia	United States	Iran	
1999	(United States) Spokane	April 2–3	United States	Iran	Cuba	
2000	(United States) Fairfax	February 5–6	United States	Iran	Russia	
2001	(United States) Baltimore	May 5–6	United States	Iran	Russia	
2002	(United States) Spokane	April 6–7	United States	Russia	South Korea	
2003	(United States) Boise	April 5–6	United States	All-World Team	Ukraine	
2004	(Azerbaijan) Baku	April 3–4	Azerbaijan	Russia	Cuba	
2005	(Uzbekistan) Tashkent	March 12–13	Cuba	Ukraine	Russia	
2006	(Iran) Sari	February 18–19	Iran	Cuba	Ukraine	
2007	(Russia) Krasnoyarsk	March 24–25	Russia	Iran	Uzbekistan	
2008	(Russia) Vladikavkaz	February 16–17	Russia	Cuba	Uzbekistan	
2009	(Iran) Tehran	March 7–8	Azerbaijan	Iran	Russia	
2010	(Russia) Moscow	March 6–7	Russia	Iran	Azerbaijan	
2011	(Russia) Makhachkala	March 19–20	Russia	Iran	Azerbaijan	
2012	(Azerbaijan) Baku	May 12–13	Iran	Azerbaijan	United States	
2013	(Iran) Tehran	February 21–22	Iran	Russia	United States	
2014	(United States) Los Angeles	March 15–16	Iran	Russia	United States	
2015	(United States) Los Angeles	April 11–12	Iran	United States	Azerbaijan	
2016	(United States) Los Angeles	June 11–12	Iran	Russia	Georgia	
2017	(Iran) Kermanshah	February 16–17	Iran	United States	Azerbaijan	
2018	(United States) Iowa City	April 7–8	United States	Azerbaijan	Japan	
2019	(Russia) Yakutsk	March 16–17	Russia	Iran	United States	
2022	(United States) Coralville	December 10–11	United States	Iran	All-World Team	

Titles

- Soviet Union 15
- United States 15
- Iran 8
- Russia 7
- Azerbaijan 2
- Cuba 1

=== Men's Greco-Roman ===
Year	Host city	Dates	1st	2nd	3rd	Ref
1980	(Sweden) Trelleborg	December 1–2	Soviet Union	Sweden	United States	
1981	(Bulgaria) Sofia	November 27–29	Soviet Union	No data available		
1982	(Hungary) Budapest	November 26–28	Soviet Union	Hungary	All-European Team	
1983	(Greece) Thessaloniki	November 25–27	Soviet Union	Cuba	Greece	
1984	(Finland) Seinäjoki	November 10–11	Soviet Union	Finland	United States	
1985	(Sweden) Lund	November 9–10	Soviet Union	Sweden	Cuba	
1986	(United States) Oak Lawn	November 15–16	Soviet Union	Hungary	United States	
1987	(United States) Albany	November 14–15	Soviet Union	Cuba	United States	
1988	(Greece) Athens	November 19–20	Soviet Union	Cuba	United States	
1989	(Norway) Fredrikstad	November 25–26	Soviet Union	Cuba	United States	
1990	(Sweden) Gothenburg	November 24–25	Soviet Union	Cuba	United States	
1991	(Greece) Thessaloniki	November 9–10	Soviet Union	United States	Greece	
1992	(France) Besançon	November 20–21	Cuba	United States	Russia	
1993	(Finland) Heinola	November 6–7	Russia	South Korea	Finland	
1994	(Hungary) Kecskemét	October 29–30	Ukraine	Hungary	United States	
1995	(Germany) Schifferstadt	November 4–5	Cuba	Russia	Germany	
1996	(United States) Colorado Springs	November 9–10	Cuba	Russia	United States	
1997	(Iran) Tehran	November 13–14	Turkey	Russia	South Korea	
2001	(France) Levallois-Perret	November 3–4	Russia	Turkey	United States	
2002	(Egypt) Cairo	October 19–20	Turkey	Egypt	United States	
2003	(Kazakhstan) Almaty	October 25–26	Russia	Kazakhstan	Georgia	
2004	(Georgia (country)) Tbilisi	November 6–7	Georgia	Iran	United States	
2005	(Iran) Tehran	February 3–4	Cuba	Russia	Iran	
2006	(Hungary) Budapest	March 4–5	Turkey	Russia	Cuba	
2007	(Turkey) Antalya	February 24–25	Ukraine	United States	Turkey	
2008	(Hungary) Szombathely	February 28–29	Russia	Hungary	Iran	
2009	(France) Clermont-Ferrand	February 20–21	Russia	France	Armenia	
2010	(Armenia) Yerevan	February 13–14	Iran	Turkey	Armenia	
2011	(Belarus) Minsk	February 19–20	Iran	Russia	Belarus	
2012	(Russia) Saransk	May 19–20	Iran	Turkey	South Korea	
2013	(Iran) Tehran	February 19–20	Russia	Iran	Turkey	
2014	(Iran) Tehran	May 15–16	Iran	Russia	Azerbaijan	
2015	(Iran) Tehran	February 19–20	Azerbaijan	Russia	Iran	
2016	(Iran) Shiraz	May 19–20	Iran	Russia	Turkey	
2017	(Iran) Abadan	March 16–17	Russia	Azerbaijan	Iran	
2022	(Azerbaijan) Baku	November 5–6	Iran	Azerbaijan	All-World Team	

Titles

- Soviet Union 12
- Russia 7
- Iran 6
- Cuba 4
- Turkey 3
- Ukraine 2
- Azerbaijan 1
- Georgia 1

=== Women's freestyle ===
Year	Host city	Dates	1st	2nd	3rd	Ref
2001	(France) Levallois-Perret	November 3–4	Japan	China	Russia	
2002	(Egypt) Cairo	October 19–20	Japan	Russia	Ukraine	
2003	(Japan) Tokyo	October 11–12	United States	Japan	Canada	
2004	(Japan) Tokyo	October 8–9	Japan	Canada	China	
2005	(France) Clermont-Ferrand	May 20–21	Japan	Ukraine	Russia	
2006	(Japan) Nagoya	May 20–21	Japan	Canada	United States	
2007	(Russia) Krasnoyarsk	March 22–23	China	Japan	Russia	
2008	(China) Taiyuan	January 19–20	China	United States	Japan	
2009	(China) Taiyuan	March 21–22	China	Canada	Japan	
2010	(China) Nanjing	March 27–28	China	United States	Japan	
2011	(France) Liévin	March 5–6	China	United States	Japan	
2012	(Japan) Tokyo	May 26–27	Japan	Russia	China	
2013	(Mongolia) Ulaanbaatar	March 2–3	China	Mongolia	Japan	
2014	(Japan) Tokyo	March 15–16	Japan	Russia	China	
2015	(Russia) Saint Petersburg	March 7–8	Japan	Russia	Mongolia	
2017	(Russia) Cheboksary	December 1–2	Japan	China	Mongolia	
2018	(Japan) Takasaki	March 17–18	Japan	China	Mongolia	
2019	(Japan) Narita	November 16–17	Japan	United States	China	
2022	(United States) Coralville	December 10–11	Ukraine	China	Mongolia	

Titles

- Japan 11
- China 6
- Ukraine 1
- United States 1

== See also ==
- World Wrestling Championships
- 1956 Wrestling World Cup
- 1958 Wrestling World Cup
- 2020 Individual Wrestling World Cup
