= The Ultimate Fighter: Tournament of Champions =

UFC mixed martial arts television series and event in 2016

- Genre: Reality, Sports
- Created by: Frank Fertitta III, Lorenzo Fertitta, Dana White
- Starring: Dana White, Joseph Benavidez, Henry Cejudo
- Country of origin: United States

Production
- Running time: 60 minutes

Original release
- Network: Fox Sports 1
- Release: August 31, 2016

The Ultimate Fighter: Tournament of Champions (also known as The Ultimate Fighter 24 and Team Benavidez vs. Team Cejudo) is an installment of the Ultimate Fighting Championship (UFC)-produced reality television series The Ultimate Fighter.

On May 11, 2016 the UFC announced that the 16 competitors for the season would be made up of flyweight fighters from various locations who are champions in their respective organizations around the world, with the winner being expected to have a chance to fight for the UFC Flyweight Championship. The cast was announced on July 20.

The coaches for the season were former flyweight title challengers Joseph Benavidez and Henry Cejudo.

== Cast ==
=== Teams ===
Team Benavidez

- Joseph Benavidez, Head Coach
- Robert Drysdale
- Danny Castillo
- Eddie Barraco
- Robert Follis

Team Cejudo:
- Henry Cejudo, Head Coach
- Eric Albarracin
- Víctor Dávila
- Kirian Fitzgibbons
- Gastón Bolaños

=== Fighters ===
- Team Benavidez
  - Tim Elliott, Brandon Moreno, Damacio Page, Eric Shelton, Ronaldo Candido, Matt Rizzo, Hiromasa Ougikubo and Terrence Mitchell.
- Team Cejudo
  - Charlie Alaniz, Alexandre Pantoja, Adam Antolin, Yoni Sherbatov, Jamie Alvarez, Matt Schnell, Nkazimulo Zulu and Kai Kara-France.

== Episodes ==
Episode 1: The Tournament Begins (August 31, 2016)

- The fighters arrive in Las Vegas and some of them are introduced via confessionals. All of the contestants are currently champions in their organizations.
- UFC President Dana White and coaches Joseph Benavidez and Henry Cejudo arrive at the gym. They welcome the fighters, but before further procedures are taken, UFC Flyweight Champion Demetrious Johnson is called by White. He delivers a message to the group stating that he hopes they learn a lot and he looks forward to defend his belt on the finale.
- Johnson leaves and White explains what's going to happen: The fighters will split up for evaluation into various drills with Benavidez, Cejudo and their individual coaching staffs judging skills before team selections.
- White kicked off the tournament by flipping a coin (blue for Benavidez, yellow for Cejudo) to determine which team will pick the first fighter. Team Benavidez wins the coin toss and White reveals the fighters have been seeded by the UFC for the tournament (which was unknown to the coaches). As a coach makes a pick, the corresponding fighter based on seed will go to the other coach (e.g., if the #1 seeded fighter is picked by a coach, the #16 seeded fighter will go to the other coach).
- The eight coaches' picks (and corresponding seed sent to the other team as well as the organizations they are champions):

Tim Elliott (Titan Fighting Championships) – Ranked #3 (Team Benavidez – first pick)
Charlie Alaniz (Hex Fight Series – Australia) – Ranked #14 (Team Cejudo)

Alexandre Pantoja (Resurrection Fighting Alliance) – Ranked #1 (Team Cejudo – second pick)
Brandon Moreno (World Fighting Federation) – Ranked #16 (Team Benavidez)

Damacio Page (Legacy Fighting Championship) – Ranked #4 (Team Benavidez – third pick)
Adam Antolin (Tachi Palace Fights) – Ranked #13 (Team Cejudo)

Yoni Sherbatov (Xcessive Force Fighting Championship – Canada) – Ranked #2 (Team Cejudo – fourth pick)
Eric Shelton (Caged Aggression MMA)– Ranked #15 (Team Benavidez)

Ronaldo Candido (Shooto – South America) – Ranked #7 (Team Benavidez – fifth pick)
Jamie Alvarez (Absolute Fighting Championship) – Ranked #10 (Team Cejudo)

Matt Schnell (Legacy Fighting Championship – interim) – Ranked #6 (Team Cejudo – sixth pick)
Matt Rizzo (Ring of Combat)– Ranked #11 (Team Benavidez)

Hiromasa Ogikubo (Shooto – Japan) – Ranked #5 (Team Benavidez – seventh pick)
Nkazimulo Zulu (Extreme Fighting Championship – South Africa) – Ranked #12 (Team Cejudo)

Kai Kara-France (Bragging Rights Fight Series – Australia) – Ranked #9 (Team Cejudo – eight pick)
Terrence Mitchell (Alaska Fighting Championship) – Ranked #8 (Team Benavidez)

- The fighters leave the gym and head back to the "TUF" house for the first time. The language and cultural barrier between the athletes is evident from the outset, but everyone is willing to endure the situation as they focus on the end prize.
- At the first Team Benavidez training session, coach Benavidez makes it clear to his fighters he's not looking to change anyone's fighting style or approach to the sport. He simply wants to maximize the training environment for the athletes so they are at their best. Many of the fighters embrace him and believe he will be the superior coach with the superior team. Meanwhile, Team Cejudo follows with its first training session, and unsurprisingly the team led by the 2008 Olympic gold medalist starts with wrestling drills. Some fighters express disappointment they didn't end up on Team Benavidez, but by the end of practice are generally pleased with where they ended up.
- Back at the house, upcoming opponents Pantoja and Moreno end up on the balcony together and are interacting. Although one is from Brazil and the other is from Mexico, they find a way to communicate due to similar languages and discover their backgrounds have many common traits.
- As the fighters finalize their preparation, Cejudo is already struggling with a coaching compromise. Moreno is one of his teammates and close friends from Arizona, and therefore he does not feel comfortable coaching Pantoja against him in the fight. He wishes Pantoja the best of luck but informs him that he will be removing himself from corner duties.
- Alexandre Pantoja defeated Brandon Moreno via submission (rear-naked choke) in the second round.
- The focus immediately shifts to the next bout, where #8 Mitchell will face off against #9 Kara-France. Both fighters finalize their preparation, trying to shore up any holes in their game that could be exposed in the upcoming contest. Cejudo expresses some concern about Kara-France, who he believes has some confidence issues going into his matchup.
- Kai Kara-France defeated Terrence Mitchell via KO (punch) in the first round.
- The next fight is announced: #5 Hiromasa Ogikubo vs. #12 Nkazimulo Zulu.

Episode 2: Language of Combat (September 7, 2016)

- Hiromasa Ogikubo defeated Nkazimulo Zulu via submission (rear-naked choke) in the second round.
- The next fight is announced: #4 Damacio Page vs. #13 Adam Antolin.

Episode 3: Look Through Your Soul (September 14, 2016)

- Adam Antolin defeated Damacio Page via TKO (body kick and punches) in the second round.
- The next fight is announced: #2 Yoni Sherbatov vs. #15 Eric Shelton.

Episode 4: Young and Hungry (September 21, 2016)

- Wanting their fighters to learn from their mistakes, Coaches Benavidez and Cejudo both hold a film session by showing their teams footage of their losses to current UFC flyweight champion Demetrious Johnson.
- Eric Shelton defeated Yoni Sherbatov via technical submission (rear-naked choke) in the second round.
- The next fight is announced: #7 Ronaldo Candido vs. #10 Jamie Alvarez.

Episode 5: Nothing Stops Us (September 28, 2016)

- As a reward for their hard work, Dana White lets the fighters watch UFC 200 at the TUF house.
- UFC Heavyweight contender Travis Browne stops by the house to show off Harley-Davidson's custom motorcycles. He also informs them, "In honor of the 24th season of TUF, the winner and somebody that inspires them is going to get a brand new 2017 Harley-Davidson and sign them up for the riding academy."
- Ronaldo Candido defeated Jamie Alvarez via Submission (rear-naked choke) in the first round.
- The next fight is announced: #6 Matt Schnell vs. #11 Matt Rizzo.

Episode 6: Let It Loose (October 5, 2016)

- Coach Benavidez wants his team to take a break from training and getting away from the TUF house and rewards them with a day paddle boarding on Lake Las Vegas.
- Matt Schnell defeated Matt Rizzo via submission (triangle choke) in the second round.
- The next fight is announced: #3 Tim Elliott vs. #14 Charlie Alaniz.

Episode 7: Animal Instincts (October 12, 2016)

- After the fighters relax in the hot tub and start drinking at the TUF house, Jamie Alvarez and Matt Rizzo get into a heated argument over their fight performances.
- Emotions are high during Team Cejudo's training session when Charlie Alaniz starts smack talking about how he's going to "knock out" Kai Kara-France, his training partner. An annoyed Kai then brings it up after practice to the coaches.
- This season's coaches challenge takes them to Top Golf driving range. Each coach must hit 20 golf balls in ring-shaped targets, trying to get the ball as close they can to the center target in order to score the most points. The farther away the target, the higher the score. And the highest score is a hole in one at the center of the farthest target. The first coach to earn 100 points wins a trophy and $10,000 ($1,500 per fighter) for their team. After 19 rounds, Benavidez wins the challenge with a score of 144 to 28.
- Tim Elliott defeated Charlie Alaniz by submission (bulldog choke) in the first round.
- The fights for the next round are announced:

#1 Alexandre Pantoja vs. #9 Kai Kara-France.
#5 Hiromasa Ogikubo vs. #13 Adam Antolin.
#7 Ronaldo Candido vs. #15 Eric Shelton.
#3 Tim Elliott vs. #6 Matt Schnell.

Episode 8: Round Two (November 2, 2016)

- The coaches reward the fighters for their hard work by throwing them a pool party at the TUF house.
- Joe Benavidez invites former UFC fighter Duane Ludwig to help train not only his team but Henry Cejudo's team as well. There's just one condition; Cejudo cannot be there during the training session, much to the dislike of Cejudo's assistant coach Kirian Fitzgobbins who is Ludwig's friend.
- Alexandre Pantoja defeated Kai Kara-France via unanimous decision after two rounds.
- The next fight is #5 Hiromasa Ogikubo vs. #13 Adam Antolin.

Episode 9: What Are You Fighting For? (November 9, 2016)

- The coaches visit the TUF house to throw the fighters a "grill-out".
- Things get heated after a night of drinking, especially between Eric Shelton and Tim Elliott when they disagree on what they are fighting for.
- Hiromasa Ogikubo defeated Adam Antolin via unanimous decision after two rounds.
- The next fights are announced:

#7 Ronaldo Candido vs. #15 Eric Shelton.
#3 Tim Elliott vs. #6 Matt Schnell.

Episode 10: All On The Line (November 16, 2016)

- Coach Benavidez brings in former Bantamweight champion and teammate TJ Dillashaw to provide an unbiased coaching approach for the upcoming bout between teammates.
- Eric Shelton defeated Ronaldo Candido via unanimous decision after two rounds.
- Tim Elliott defeated Matt Schnell via submission (front naked choke) in the first round.
- The fights for the next round are announced:

#1 Alexandre Pantoja vs. #5 Hiromasa Ogikubo.
#15 Eric Shelton vs. #3 Tim Elliott.

Episode 11: About To Clash (November 23, 2016)

- The first semifinal fight immediately takes place.
- Hiromasa Ogikubo defeated Alexandre Pantoja via unanimous decision after two rounds.
- With Ogikubo's win no members of Team Cejudo remain in the competition.
- Tim Elliott defeated Eric Shelton via majority decision after two rounds.
- Coach Benavidez and many others believed the fight should have gone to a third round.
- The final fight of the competition is announced with the winner receiving a title shot at Demetrious Johnson:

#5 Hiromasa Ogikubo vs #3 Tim Elliott.

Episode 12: Last Champion Standing (November 30, 2016)

- Elliott and Ogikubo are allowed to make calls to their families as reward for making it to the final round of the tournament.
- Team Benavidez has a final dinner together discussing their time together before the final fight is underway.
- Tim Elliott defeated Hiromasa Ogikubo via unanimous decision after two rounds.
- Tim Elliott wins the tournament and earns the title shot at Demetrious Johnson.

== Tournament bracket ==
Round of 16
1 Alexandre Pantoja	SUB
16 Brandon Moreno	2
8 Terrence Mitchell	1
9 Kai Kara France	KO
5 Hiromasa Ogikubo	SUB
12 Nkazimulo Zulu	2
4 Damacio Page	2
13 Adam Antolin	TKO
2 Yoni Sherbatov	2
15 Eric Shelton	SUB
7 Ronaldo Candido	SUB
10 Jamie Alvarez	1
6 Matt Schnell	SUB
11 Matt Rizzo	2
3 Tim Elliott	SUB
14 Charlie Alaniz	1

Quarter-finals
1 Alexandre Pantoja	UD
9 Kai Kara France	2
5 Hiromasa Ogikubo	UD
13 Adam Antolin	2
15 Eric Shelton	UD
7 Ronaldo Candido	2
6 Matt Schnell	1
3 Tim Elliott	SUB

Semi-finals
1 Alexandre Pantoja	2
5 Hiromasa Ogikubo	UD
15 Eric Shelton	2
3 Tim Elliott	MD

Final
5 Hiromasa Ogikubo	3
3 Tim Elliott	UD

Legend
	Team Benavidez
	Team Cejudo
UD	Unanimous Decision
MD	Majority Decision
SUB	Submission
(T)KO	(Technical) Knock Out

== The Ultimate Fighter 24 Finale ==
The Ultimate Fighter: Tournament of Champions Finale
- The poster for The Ultimate Fighter: Tournament of Champions Finale
- Promotion: Ultimate Fighting Championship
- Date: December 3, 2016
- Venue: Palms Casino Resort
- City: Las Vegas, Nevada
- Attendance: 2,044
- Total gate: $188,602

Event chronology
UFC Fight Night: Whittaker vs. Brunson	The Ultimate Fighter: Tournament of Champions Finale	UFC Fight Night: Lewis vs. Abdurakhimov

The Ultimate Fighter: Tournament of Champions Finale (also known as The Ultimate Fighter 24 Finale) was a mixed martial arts event promoted by the Ultimate Fighting Championship held on December 3, 2016, at Palms Casino Resort in Las Vegas, Nevada.

=== Background ===
The event was headlined by a UFC Flyweight Championship bout between UFC champion Demetrious Johnson and Tim Elliott, the winner of the flyweight tournament from The Ultimate Fighter 24. The TUF winner also received a Harley-Davidson motorcycle of his choosing and a six-figure UFC contract.

Also, a flyweight bout between season coaches and former title challengers Joseph Benavidez and Henry Cejudo served as the co-main event.

Jake Collier was expected to face Josh Stansbury at the event. However, Collier pulled out of the fight in late October citing injury and was replaced by Devin Clark.

The Ultimate Fighter: Latin America bantamweight winner Alejandro Pérez was scheduled to face Rob Font at the event, but pulled out on November 24. He was replaced by promotional newcomer and this Ultimate Fighter season's contestant Matt Schnell.

=== Results ===
Main Card (Fox Sports 1)
Weight class				Method	Round	Time	Notes
Flyweight	Demetrious Johnson (c)	def.	Tim Elliott	Decision (unanimous) (49–46, 49–46, 49–45)	5	5:00	(Note: For the UFC Flyweight Championship.)
Flyweight	Joseph Benavidez	def.	Henry Cejudo	Decision (split) (27–29, 30–26, 29–27)	3	5:00	(Note: Cejudo was deducted one point in round 1 due to repeated low blows.)
Welterweight	Jorge Masvidal	def.	Jake Ellenberger	TKO (punches)	1	4:05	(Note: Ellenberger caught his foot in the fence, and was punched while trying to free it. After pausing the fight, referee Herb Dean asked state officials whether this counted as a cage malfunction (which could mean a timeout or no contest), and was told it did not. Ellenberger tried to appeal the decision, but the Nevada Athletic Commission dismissed it.)
Light Heavyweight	Jared Cannonier	def.	Ion Cuțelaba	Decision (unanimous) (29–28, 29–28, 29–28)	3	5:00
Women's Bantamweight	Sara McMann	def.	Alexis Davis	Submission (arm-triangle choke)	2	2:52
Flyweight	Brandon Moreno	def.	Ryan Benoit	Decision (split) (28–29, 29–28, 29–28)	3	5:00
Preliminary Card (Fox Sports 1)
Featherweight	Ryan Hall	def.	Gray Maynard	Decision (unanimous) (30–27, 30–27, 29–28)	3	5:00
Bantamweight	Rob Font	def.	Matt Schnell	TKO (knee and punches)	1	3:47
Lightweight	Dong Hyun Ma	def.	Brendan O'Reilly	Decision (unanimous) (29–28, 29–28, 29–28)	3	5:00
Women's Strawweight	Jamie Moyle	def.	Kailin Curran	Decision (unanimous) (30–27, 30–27, 30–27)	3	5:00
Preliminary Card (UFC Fight Pass)
Middleweight	Anthony Smith	def.	Elvis Mutapčić	TKO (elbow and punches)	2	3:27
Light Heavyweight	Devin Clark	def.	Josh Stansbury	Decision (unanimous) (30–27, 30–27, 29–28)	3	5:00

=== Bonus awards ===
The following fighters were awarded $50,000 bonuses:

- Fight of the Night: Jared Cannonier vs. Ion Cuțelaba
- Performance of the Night: Sara McMann and Anthony Smith

=== Reported payout ===
The following is the reported payout to the fighters as reported to the Nevada State Athletic Commission. It does not include sponsor money and also does not include the UFC's traditional "fight night" bonuses.

- Demetrious Johnson: $350,000 (no win bonus) def. Tim Elliott: $100,000
- Joseph Benavidez: $140,000 (includes $70,000 win bonus) def. Henry Cejudo: $50,000
- Jorge Masvidal: $120,000 (includes $60,000 win bonus) def. Jake Ellenberger: $78,000
- Jared Cannonier: $24,000 (includes $12,000 win bonus) def. Ion Cuțelaba: $12,000
- Sara McMann: $56,000 (includes $28,000 win bonus) def. Alexis Davis: $27,000
- Brandon Moreno: $24,000 (includes $12,000 win bonus) def. Ryan Benoit: $15,000
- Ryan Hall: $34,000 (includes $17,000 win bonus) def. Gray Maynard: $51,000
- Rob Font: $33,000 (includes $16,500 win bonus) def. Matt Schnell: $10,000
- Dong Hyun Kim: $20,000 (includes $10,000 win bonus) def. Brendan O'Reilly: $10,000
- Jamie Moyle: $20,000 (includes $10,000 win bonus) def. Kailin Curran: $20,000
- Anthony Smith: $30,000 (includes $15,000 win bonus) def. Elvis Mutapcic: $16,000
- Devin Clark: $20,000 (includes $10,000 win bonus) def. Josh Stansbury: $12,000

== See also ==
- The Ultimate Fighter
- List of current UFC fighters
- List of UFC events
- 2016 in UFC
