= 2006 World Junior Wrestling Championships =

Junior Wrestling Championships

- Host city: Guatemala City, Guatemala
- Dates: August 28–September 3, 2006

Champions
- Freestyle: Russia
- Greco-Roman: Turkey
- Women: Japan

The 2006 World Junior Wrestling Championships were the 30th edition of the World Junior Wrestling Championships and were held in Guatemala City, Guatemala between August 28–September 3, 2006.

== Medal table ==
Rank	Nation	Gold	Silver	Bronze	Total
1	Russia	9	2	7	18
2	Turkey	5	1	2	8
3	Japan	3	0	3	6
4	Iran	1	5	1	7
5	United States	1	1	5	7
6	Belarus	1	1	1	3
7	Colombia	1	1	0	2
8	Hungary	1	0	2	3
8	Sweden	1	0	2	3
10	Latvia	1	0	0	1
11	Ukraine	0	3	5	8
12	Georgia	0	2	3	5
12	Kazakhstan	0	2	3	5
14	Bulgaria	0	1	2	3
15	Germany	0	1	1	2
15	South Korea	0	1	1	2
17	Brazil	0	1	0	1
17	Ecuador	0	1	0	1
17	Mongolia	0	1	0	1
20	Kyrgyzstan	0	0	2	2
20	Romania	0	0	2	2
22	Cuba	0	0	1	1
22	Finland	0	0	1	1
22	Guatemala	0	0	1	1
22	Moldova	0	0	1	1
22	Poland	0	0	1	1
22	South Africa	0	0	1	1
Totals (27 entries)		24	24	48	96

== Medal summary ==
=== Men's freestyle ===
Event	Gold	Silver	Bronze
50 kg	Ahmet Peker; Turkey	Abbas Dabbaghi; Iran	Pieter Schyf; South Africa
50 kg	Ahmet Peker; Turkey	Abbas Dabbaghi; Iran	Patrick McCaffery; United States
55 kg	Dzhamal Otarsultanov; Russia	Henry Cejudo; United States	Ulu Nurlan Turabek; Kyrgyzstan
55 kg	Dzhamal Otarsultanov; Russia	Henry Cejudo; United States	Svetoslav Neychev; Bulgaria
60 kg	Mehdi Taghavi; Iran	George Makishvili; Georgia	Shigeki Osawa; Japan
60 kg	Mehdi Taghavi; Iran	George Makishvili; Georgia	Samat Zhakupov; Kazakhstan
66 kg	Darsam Dzaparov; Russia	Oleg Rossol; Ukraine	Saeid Tavakoli; Iran
66 kg	Darsam Dzaparov; Russia	Oleg Rossol; Ukraine	Noruzbek Belekov; Kyrgyzstan
74 kg	Kakhaber Khubezhty; Russia	Sadegh Goudarzi; Iran	Aoi Otsuki; Japan
74 kg	Kakhaber Khubezhty; Russia	Sadegh Goudarzi; Iran	Gia Chikhladze; Ukraine
84 kg	Imants Lagodskis; Latvia	Edgar Yenokyan; Armenia	Reineris Salas; Cuba
84 kg	Imants Lagodskis; Latvia	Edgar Yenokyan; Armenia	Nicolai Ceban; Moldova
96 kg	Alan Lokhov; Russia	Davit Modzmanashvili; Georgia	Viktor Kykot; Ukraine
96 kg	Alan Lokhov; Russia	Davit Modzmanashvili; Georgia	Rıza Yıldırım; Turkey
120 kg	Bilyal Makhov; Russia	Mohammad Azarshakib; Iran	Giorgi Nikuradze; Georgia
120 kg	Bilyal Makhov; Russia	Mohammad Azarshakib; Iran	Mehmet Yeşil Yeşil; Turkey

=== Greco-Roman ===
Event	Gold	Silver	Bronze
50 kg	Damir Ahmedianov; Russia	Askhat Kudaibergenov; Kazakhstan	Lasha Gogitadze; Georgia
50 kg	Damir Ahmedianov; Russia	Askhat Kudaibergenov; Kazakhstan	Peter Modos; Hungary
55 kg	Zaur Kuramagomedov; Russia	Jasem Amiri; Iran	Spenser Mango; United States
55 kg	Zaur Kuramagomedov; Russia	Jasem Amiri; Iran	Aleksandar Kostadinov; Bulgaria
60 kg	Islambek Albiev; Russia	Soner Sucu; Turkey	Ryu Han-su; South Korea
60 kg	Islambek Albiev; Russia	Soner Sucu; Turkey	Ville Pasanen; Finland
66 kg	Refik Ayvazoğlu; Turkey	Kim Hyeon-woo; South Korea	Tamás Lőrincz; Hungary
66 kg	Refik Ayvazoğlu; Turkey	Kim Hyeon-woo; South Korea	Ruslan Belkhoroev; Russia
74 kg	Mehmet Ümit Bedel; Turkey	Davoud Abedinzadeh; Iran	Dmytro Pyshkov; Ukraine
74 kg	Mehmet Ümit Bedel; Turkey	Davoud Abedinzadeh; Iran	Evgeni Popov; Russia
84 kg	Cenk İldem; Turkey	Jan Fischer; Germany	Oleg Shokalov; Russia
84 kg	Cenk İldem; Turkey	Jan Fischer; Germany	David Karchava; Georgia
96 kg	Ivan Nemeth; Hungary	Oleg Kryoka; Ukraine	Nurmakhan Tinaliyev; Kazakhstan
96 kg	Ivan Nemeth; Hungary	Oleg Kryoka; Ukraine	Roman Marchenko; Russia
120 kg	İsmail Güzel; Turkey	Ivan Ivanov; Bulgaria	Soslan Farniev; Russia
120 kg	İsmail Güzel; Turkey	Ivan Ivanov; Bulgaria	Artem Tsepovatenko; Ukraine

=== Women's freestyle ===
Event	Gold	Silver	Bronze
44 kg	Nicole Tyson; United States	Diana Piza; Ecuador	Anastasia Koltun; Russia
44 kg	Nicole Tyson; United States	Diana Piza; Ecuador	Jennifer Hernandez; Guatemala
48 kg	Sofia Mattsson; Sweden	Natalya Pulkovska; Ukraine	Zhuldyz Eshimova-Turtbayeva; Kazakhstan
48 kg	Sofia Mattsson; Sweden	Natalya Pulkovska; Ukraine	Fuyuko Mimura; Japan
51 kg	Megumi Maehara; Japan	Ekaterina Krasnova; Russia	Maryna Markevich; Belarus
51 kg	Megumi Maehara; Japan	Ekaterina Krasnova; Russia	Jessica Medina; United States
55 kg	Sandra Velandia; Colombia	Alena Filipava; Belarus	Johanna Mattsson; Sweden
55 kg	Sandra Velandia; Colombia	Alena Filipava; Belarus	Danyelle Hedin; United States
59 kg	Larissa Kanaeva; Russia	Jackeline Rentería; Colombia	Anna Zwirydowska; Poland
59 kg	Larissa Kanaeva; Russia	Jackeline Rentería; Colombia	Anna Vasilenko; Ukraine
63 kg	Mio Nishimaki; Japan	Yelena Shalygina; Kazakhstan	Mihaela Panait; Romania
63 kg	Mio Nishimaki; Japan	Yelena Shalygina; Kazakhstan	Helena Allandi; Sweden
67 kg	Yoshiko Inoue; Japan	Natalya Laushkina; Russia	Kristin Buettner; Germany
67 kg	Yoshiko Inoue; Japan	Natalya Laushkina; Russia	Elena Mudrag; Romania
72 kg	Vasilisa Marzaliuk; Belarus	Aline Ferreira; Brazil	Ali Bernard; United States
72 kg	Vasilisa Marzaliuk; Belarus	Aline Ferreira; Brazil	Ekaterina Bukina; Russia
