= Henry Cejudo =

American Olympic wrestler and MMA fighter (born 1987)

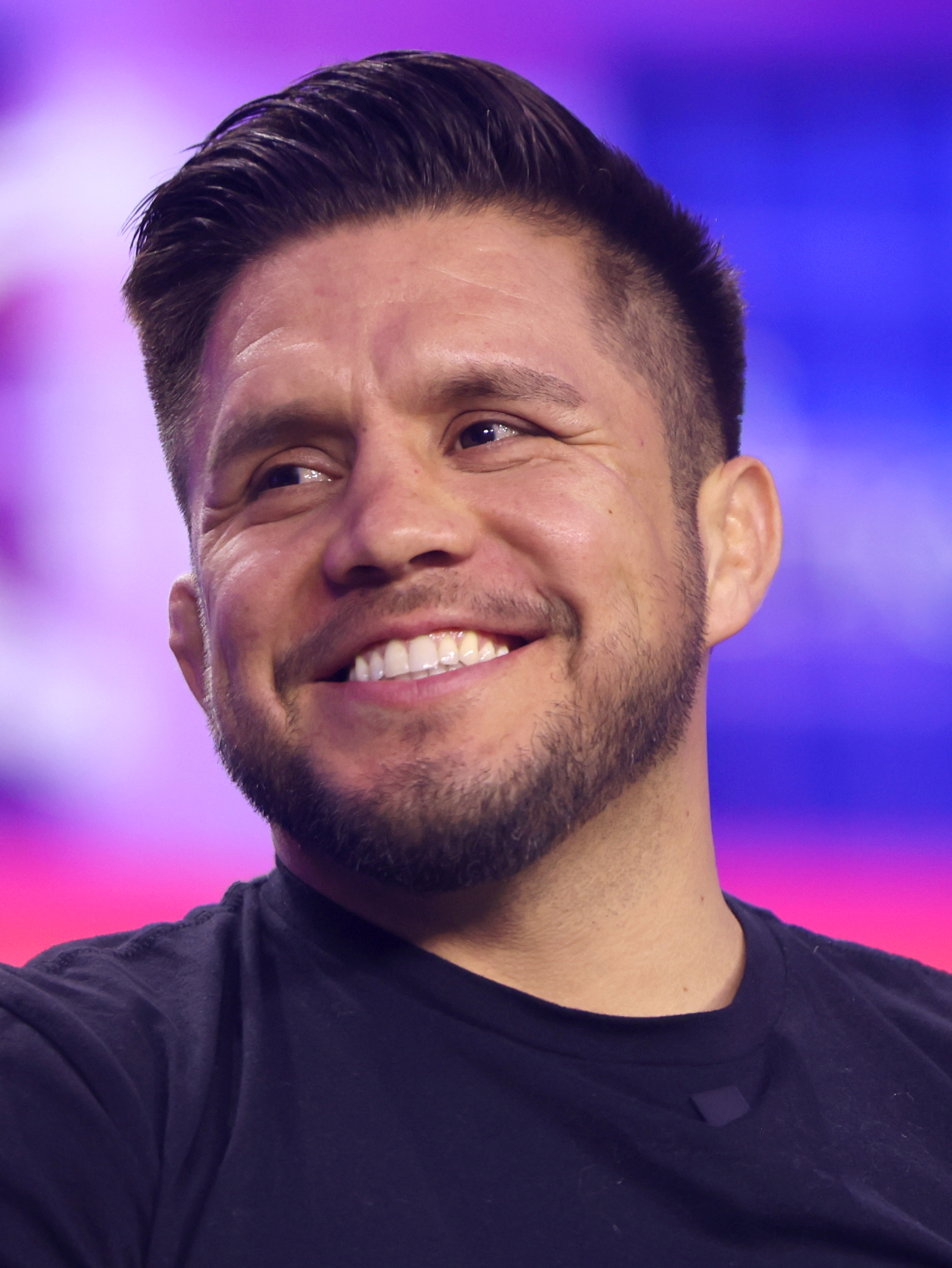
- Cejudo in 2024
- Born: Henry Carlos Cejudo; February 9, 1987 (age 39); Los Angeles, California, U.S.
- Other names: The Messenger; Triple C
- Height: 5 ft 4 in (163 cm)
- Weight: 135 lb (61 kg; 9 st 9 lb)
- Division: Flyweight (2014–2019); Bantamweight (2013–2014, 2019–2025); 55 kg (freestyle wrestling)
- Reach: 64 in (163 cm)
- Style: Freestyle wrestling
- Fighting out of: Phoenix, Arizona, U.S.
- Team: Fight Ready
- Trainer: Eric Albarracin (MMA); Kevin Jackson (wrestling)
- Rank: Yellow belt in Shotokan karate
- Wrestling: Olympic freestyle wrestling
- Years active: 2013–2020, 2023-2025 (MMA); 2005–2008, 2011–2012, 2026–present) (freestyle wrestling)

Mixed martial arts record
- Total: 22
- Wins: 16
- By knockout: 8
- By decision: 8
- Losses: 6
- By knockout: 1
- By decision: 5

Other information
- University: Grand Canyon University
- Notable schools: Coronado High School; Maryvale High School
- Website: henrycejudo.com
- Mixed martial arts record from Sherdog
Medal record
Men's freestyle wrestling
Representing United States
Olympic Games
Gold medal – first place	2008 Beijing	55 kg
World Cup
Bronze medal – third place	2007 Krasnoyarsk	55 kg
Pan American Games
Gold medal – first place	2007 Rio de Janeiro	55 kg
Pan American Championships
Gold medal – first place	2006 Rio de Janeiro	55 kg
Gold medal – first place	2007 San Salvador	55 kg
Gold medal – first place	2008 Colorado Springs	55 kg
US National Championships
Gold medal – first place	2006 Las Vegas	55 kg
Gold medal – first place	2007 Las Vegas	55 kg
Silver medal – second place	2008 Las Vegas	55 kg
Junior World Championships
Silver medal – second place	2006 Guatemala City	55 kg

YouTube information
- Channel: Henry Cejudo
- Subscribers: 213 thousand
- Views: 79.9 million
- Last updated: January 16, 2026

Henry Carlos Cejudo (born February 9, 1987) is an American freestyle wrestler and former professional mixed martial artist. He last competed in the Bantamweight division of the Ultimate Fighting Championship (UFC), where he is a former UFC Flyweight Champion and Bantamweight Champion. Cejudo is the fourth UFC fighter to hold titles in two different weight classes simultaneously, and the second to defend titles in two different weight divisions. He is considered to be among the greatest combat athletes of all time due to his accomplishments in MMA and freestyle wrestling.

He currently competes in the Lightweight division of Real American Freestyle (RAF), where he is the current and inaugural RAF Lightweight Crossover Champion. During his wrestling career, Cejudo competed at 55 kilograms and became the youngest American Olympic gold medalist in wrestling history at the time, winning the 2008 Summer Olympics at age 21. As a senior level freestyle wrestler, he was also a 2007 Pan American Games gold medalist, as well as a multiple-time Pan American Championships gold medalist and US national champion.

== Background ==
Born to Mexican immigrants in Los Angeles, California, Cejudo is the second youngest of the family's seven siblings. As a result of his violent father's drug and alcohol abuse, Cejudo's family constantly moved around the Los Angeles area.

When Cejudo was four, his mother fled to New Mexico with her children before his father, who was jailed after threatening to kill his whole family and subsequently getting into an altercation in the street, was released. His father was deported when Cejudo was six years old and died when Cejudo was about 20 years old. After a couple of years in New Mexico, the family relocated to Phoenix, Arizona. In Phoenix, the family lived in Maryvale in poverty despite their mother working multiple jobs to make ends meet.

Cejudo never slept alone in his own bed until he was provided one by USA Wrestling while participating in a residency program at the US Olympic Training Center in Colorado. He also started competing as an amateur boxer, and won the annual state Copper Gloves boxing tournament in 2010 in Phoenix, Arizona.

Cejudo enrolled at Grand Canyon University in 2010 and graduated in 2015 with a degree in Theology.

== Wrestling career ==
=== Early career ===
Inspired by his older brother Angel Cejudo, who was an undefeated four-time Arizona wrestling state champion with a record of 150 wins and zero defeats who represented the United States internationally. Henry also became a four-time state champion. His freshman and sophomore year titles were won in Arizona, before he moved to Colorado Springs, Colorado, to become a resident athlete at the United States Olympic Training Center. He won the Colorado state championships (CHSAA) as a junior and senior, and was named ASICS "National High School Wrestler of the Year" in 2006. In the same year, he was selected in USA Wrestling Magazine's "Dream Team of High School All-Americans."

In 2006, Cejudo won the Fargo National title in freestyle. Soon after his victory, he began full-time training at the United States Olympic Training Center in Colorado Springs, Colorado. There, he prepared for the U20 World Championships; after a fifth-place finish in 2005, Cejudo was able to claim the silver medal for the United States team. He opted to pursue an international career in freestyle rather than competing in collegiate wrestling.

=== Senior level ===
==== 2005–2007 ====
Cejudo made his senior level debut on October 23, 2005, at the Sunkist Open, at the age of 18. He earned notable victories over NCAA champion Jason Powell and three-time All-American Tanner Gardner before finishing fifth. On April 15, 2006, he won the US National Championship at 55 kilograms, qualifying for the US World Team Trials and becoming the first high schooler to do so since the organization (USAW) was established as the sport's governing body in 1983. At the World Team Trials, he defeated an eventual accomplished wrestler in Franklin Gómez in the opening match of the Challenge Tournament before making it to the best-of-three finals. There, he was downed twice by the 2000 Olympic silver medalist and 1998 World Champion Sammie Henson, losing the spot. He quickly bounced back a week later with a Pan American title. In his last competition of the year, Cejudo competed at the Sunkist Open, where he lost in the second round.

On March 22, 2007, Cejudo captured a bronze medal at the World Cup. In April 7, he claimed his second US National title while compiling wins over collegiate and international standout Nick Simmons and two-time All-American Vic Moreno. On May 18, he earned his second Pan American title. Cejudo then made the US World Team after two straight wins over Matt Azevedo. Before the 2007 World Championships, he warmed up with a Pan American Games title. At the World Championships, he was taken out in the opening round by Uzbekistan's Erkin Tadzhimetov and placed 31st.

==== 2008 ====
Cejudo started off the most successful year of his freestyle career in March 2, with a Pan American title. He failed to secure his third consecutive US National title after he was pinned by Matt Azevedo, not before defeating recent All-American Obe Blanc. At the US Olympic Team Trials, he started off by comfortably downing two opponents to make it to the best-of-three. There, he had a hard-fought series with 04' Olympic Silver medalist and defending Olympic team member Stephen Abas, whom he went 2–1 with, earning the US Olympic Team spot.

Cejudo was coached for the Olympics by Kevin Jackson, the first Olympic gold medalist to win a UFC championship. (Note: Kevin Jackson was the first Olympic gold medalist to win a UFC championship by winning the UFC 14 tournament.)

At the 2008 Summer Olympics, Cejudo opened up with a win over Radoslav Velikov, the 06' World Champion; after losing the first period 0–1, he bounced back with 3–2 and 4–3 periods. In the next round, he faced Besarion Gochashvili from Georgia; the same results as his opening bout popped up, after losing the first period 1–3, he came back with scores of 3–2 and 3–0 to defeat Gochashvili. He then wrestled Azerbaijan's Namig Sevdimov, whom he took out after once again losing the first period (3–5) and winning the next two (3–2, 4–3). In the finale, he met Tomohiro Matsunaga, a Japanese athlete who was coming fresh off an Asian title; he won the first period after scoring the biggest move and won the second period after a comfortable 3–0 score. This made Cejudo the youngest American to win Olympic Gold in wrestling history at age 21 (record was later broken by Kyle Snyder, 20, in 2016). He then took a break from his freestyle wrestling career.

==== 2011–2012 ====
After announcing that he would try to make a second Olympic run in 2010, Cejudo made his comeback at the 2011 Beat the Streets charity event, where he beat Rasul Mashezov 2–0 and 4–3.

In his first tournament since his lay-off, Cejudo claimed a Sunkist Open title after compiling four victories, on October 28, 2011. On November 26, 2011, he earned a silver medal from the Henri Deglane Challenge, after being defeated in the finals by Ghenadie Tulbea.

At the 2012 US Olympic Team Trials, Cejudo downed Obe Blanc before being defeated by the top-seed Nick Simmons, failing to make his second US Olympic Team. After the Simmons match, Cejudo put his shoes in the middle of the mat, signaling his retirement from the sport.

==== Appearances post-retirement ====
While already an undefeated MMA prospect, Cejudo made a brief return to the sport at the "Agon V: Iowa against the World" event by wrestling Tony Ramos (who would go on to win the US Open weeks later) on April 4, 2015, weeks after his win over Chris Cariaso at UFC 185. Despite riding an 8–2 lead, he was defeated by that year's World Team Member after he scored eight more points of his own, ending the match 8–10.

In June 2018, Cejudo was prestigiously inducted into the National Wrestling Hall of Fame as a Distinguished Member.

Soon after his exhibition match with Ramos, Cejudo flirted with the possibility of making a 2016 Olympic Run, however, his intentions never materialized.

Cejudo signed with Real American Freestyle (RAF), and debuted at RAF 06 by defeating Urijah Faber on February 28, 2026. He was scheduled to headline RAF 08 against Merab Dvalishvili on April 18, 2026, but the match was cancelled after Cejudo was injured.

The match was rescheduled for RAF Georgia on July 11, 2026. Cejudo lost to Dvalishvili by decision. This fight earned him a Match of the Night award.

Cejudo faced Dvalishvili in a rematch for the inaugural RAF Lightweight Crossover Championship on August 22, 2026 at RAF 12. Cejudo won by pinning Dvalishvili in 36 seconds.

== Mixed martial arts career ==
=== Early career ===
On January 30, 2013, Cejudo announced on his Twitter page that he planned to begin training for a career in MMA. Despite wrestling at 121 pounds during his wrestling career, Cejudo fought at 135 pounds in his MMA debut. He defeated Michael Poe by TKO due to punches in his MMA debut on March 2, 2013, for the Arizona-based World Fighting Federation.

Over the next year, Cejudo amassed a record of 6–0 with three wins by TKO, one by submission, and two by decision. Prior to signing with the UFC, Cejudo was listed as the #1 ranked bantamweight prospect in the MMA Prospects Report 2013.

=== Ultimate Fighting Championship ===
On July 25, 2014, Cejudo signed with the UFC. He is the third Olympic gold medalist wrestler in company history, after Mark Schultz and Kevin Jackson. Cejudo was expected to face Scott Jorgensen on August 30, 2014, at UFC 177. However, due to medical issues on the day of the weigh-ins, Cejudo was forced out of the bout and the fight was subsequently canceled. In light of this, and his history of missing weight, president Dana White said Cejudo had to move up to bantamweight or leave the UFC.

In his eventual debut, Cejudo faced Dustin Kimura in a bantamweight bout on December 13, 2014, at UFC on Fox 13. Cejudo won the fight by unanimous decision.

Cejudo faced Chris Cariaso in a flyweight bout on March 14, 2015, at UFC 185. He won the fight by unanimous decision.

Cejudo faced Chico Camus on June 13, 2015, at UFC 188. He won the fight by unanimous decision.

Cejudo was briefly linked to a bout against former title challenger Joseph Benavidez on September 5, 2015, at UFC 191. However, the fight did not take place at the event. In turn, Cejudo faced Jussier Formiga on November 21, 2015, at The Ultimate Fighter Latin America 2 Finale. He won the fight by split decision. Brandon Moreno confirmed that he helped Cejudo train for this fight.

On September 16, 2015, Cejudo announced that he would refuse to fight in Nevada after the Nevada State Athletic Commission suspended and fined Nick Diaz following a failed drug test at UFC 182. Cejudo cited the NSAC's process in determining Diaz's guilt as the reason for the boycott. Despite the lack of change in NSAC procedure, Cejudo ended his Nevada boycott to face UFC Flyweight champion Demetrious Johnson on April 23, 2016, at UFC 197 for the Flyweight title. He lost the fight via TKO in the first round, being dropped with a variety of strikes.

In May 2016, the UFC announced that Cejudo would be one of the coaches, opposite Joseph Benavidez on The Ultimate Fighter 24. The pairing faced each other on December 3, 2016, at The Ultimate Fighter 24 Finale. Cejudo lost the back-and-forth fight via split decision.

Cejudo was expected to face Sergio Pettis on May 13, 2017, at UFC 211. However, on May 10, Cejudo pulled out of the fight with a hand injury and the bout was canceled.

Cejudo faced Wilson Reis on September 9, 2017, at UFC 215. He won the fight via TKO in the second round. This win also won Cejudo his first Performance of the Night bonus award.

A rescheduled fight with Pettis took place on December 2, 2017, at UFC 218. Cejudo won the fight by unanimous decision.

==== Flyweight champion ====
Two years after challenging for the UFC Flyweight title, Henry Cejudo rematched with Johnson in the co-main event at UFC 227 on August 4, 2018. Cejudo went on to win the back-and-forth fight via split decision to become the second UFC Flyweight Champion and first Olympic gold medalist to win a UFC division championship. (Note: Kevin Jackson was the first Olympic gold medalist to win a UFC championship by winning the UFC 14 tournament.) This fight earned him the Fight of the Night award. 13 of 25 media outlets scored the bout in favor of Cejudo, while 12 scored it for Johnson.

In November 2018, Cejudo revealed that he had signed a six-fight contract with UFC.

In the first defense of his UFC Flyweight Championship, Cejudo was initially scheduled to face UFC Bantamweight champion T.J. Dillashaw on January 26, 2019, at UFC 233. However, after that pay-per-view event was canceled, the fight was moved a week earlier to headline UFC Fight Night 143 on January 19, 2019. It was the first title fight to showcase the new UFC legacy belt. Cejudo won the fight via TKO just 32 seconds into the first round to retain his title. The win also earned Cejudo his second Performance of the Night bonus award.

Double champion

On April 9, 2019, USADA announced that Dillashaw had tested positive for EPO in pre and post-fight screenings and had been suspended for two years. Cejudo faced Marlon Moraes on June 8, 2019 at UFC 238 for the vacant UFC Bantamweight Championship. He won the fight via TKO in the third round. This win made Cejudo the fourth fighter to hold championships simultaneously in two weight divisions in UFC, and earned him the Performance of the Night award. It was revealed later that Cejudo suffered a rolled ankle mere days before the fight, requiring therapy to even compete. In December 2019, Cejudo agreed to relinquish the UFC Flyweight title in order to focus on the bantamweight division. Cejudo became inactive until 2020 due to a shoulder injury.

Cejudo was scheduled to face José Aldo on May 9, 2020 at UFC 250. However, Aldo pulled out on April 8 due to visa issues. Cejudo faced a replacement in Dominick Cruz on May 9, 2020 at UFC 249. He won the fight via technical knockout in the second round.

During the post-fight interview Cejudo announced his retirement from professional fighting. The announcement was met with some skepticism, as various UFC commentators and fighters stated their opinion that Cejudo was using the announcement as a contract negotiation ploy. On May 24, the UFC officially vacated the UFC Bantamweight Title and removed Cejudo's name from their rankings, based on his retirement announcement.

==== Return from retirement ====
After nearly three years since his last bout, Cejudo faced Aljamain Sterling on May 6, 2023 at UFC 288 for the UFC Bantamweight Championship. He lost the close fight via split decision. 21 of 23 MMA media outlets scored the bout for Sterling, while 2 scored it for Cejudo.

Cejudo was scheduled to face Marlon Vera on August 19, 2023, at UFC 292. However, Cejudo withdrew in late June due to a shoulder injury, and was replaced by Pedro Munhoz.

Cejudo faced Merab Dvalishvili on February 17, 2024, at UFC 298. After three rounds, Cejudo was defeated via unanimous decision.

Cejudo faced Song Yadong in the main event on February 22, 2025, at UFC Fight Night 252. An accidental eyepoke by Song at the beginning of the fourth round rendered Cejudo unable to continue. Song won the fight by technical decision after the bout was stopped.

In his second retirement fight, Cejudo faced Payton Talbott on December 6, 2025 at UFC 323. He lost the fight via decision and announced his second retirement afterwards. He lost all four of his fights post-retirement. He got an immediate $50,000 bonus from UFC CEO Dana White after the bout.

== Personal life ==
Cejudo and his wife have two children.

Cejudo, along with his manager Ali Abdelaziz, fellow fighters Justin Gaethje and Colby Covington, and UFC President Dana White, all appeared at a rally for President Donald Trump in September 2020.

== Other ventures ==
Cejudo made an appearance on the May 27, 2020 episode of AEW Dynamite alongside fellow MMA fighters Rashad Evans and Vitor Belfort to support Mike Tyson in confronting members of Chris Jericho's Inner Circle. Two months later, Cejudo confirmed he was in talks with AEW about potentially signing a contract, stating that he was also considering competing in amateur wrestling as well.

=== Boxing ===
In June 2026, Ali Abdelaziz posted on his X account that he is working on a boxing match for Cejudo. On August 19, Misfits Boxing announced that Cejudo would be facing influencer Deen the Great in his boxing debut. The bout is scheduled to take place on September 28 at the James L. Knight Center in Miami, Florida. However on September 15, Deen the Great withdrew and was replaced by professional boxer Javon Walton. On the night, Cejudo defeated Walton via split decision (37–39, 39–37, 39–37) in favor of Cejudo.

== Championships and accomplishments ==
=== Mixed martial arts ===
- Ultimate Fighting Championship
  - UFC Bantamweight Championship (One time)
    - One successful title defense
  - UFC Flyweight Championship (One time)
    - One successful title defense
    - Seventh two-division champion in UFC history
    - Fourth simultaneous two-divisional champion
  - Fight of the Night (One time) vs. Demetrious Johnson 1
  - Performance of the Night (Three times) vs. Wilson Reis, T.J. Dillashaw, and Marlon Moraes
  - Holds wins over three former UFC champions — vs. Demetrious Johnson 2, T.J. Dillashaw, and Dominick Cruz
  - UFC Honors Awards
    - 2019: President's Choice Performance of the Year Nominee vs. Marlon Moraes, President's Choice Fight of the Year Nominee vs. Marlon Moraes & Fan's Choice Comeback of the Year Nominee vs. Marlon Moraes
  - UFC.com Awards
    - 2014: Ranked #10 Newcomer of the Year (Tied with Paige VanZant & Carla Esparza)
    - 2018: Ranked #4 Fighter of the Year & Ranked #4 Upset of the Year vs. Demetrious Johnson
    - 2019: Top 10 Fighter of the Year, Ranked #3 Upset of the Year vs. T.J. Dillashaw & Ranked #6 Fight of the Year vs. Marlon Moraes
- MMA Junkie
  - 2018 Upset of the Year vs. Demetrious Johnson
  - 2019 June Fight of the Month vs. Marlon Moraes
- MMA Fighting
  - 2018 Upset of the Year vs. Demetrious Johnson
  - 2010s #8 Ranked Fighter of the Decade
- MMA Weekly
  - 2018 Upset of the Year vs. Demetrious Johnson
- CBS Sports
  - 2018 #4 Ranked UFC Fighter of the Year
  - 2019 #3 Ranked UFC Fighter of the Year
- Slacky Awards
  - 2018 Technical Turn-Around of the Year tied with Dustin Poirier and Jan Błachowicz

=== Freestyle wrestling ===
- National Wrestling Hall Of Fame
  - 2018 inductee, distinguished member

2011

- (silver) Henri Deglane Challenge
- (gold) Sunkist Kids International Open

2008

- (gold) Summer Olympics (55 kg)
- (gold) Pan American Championships (55 kg)
- (gold) U.S. Olympic Team Trials (55 kg)
- (silver) U.S. Senior National Championship (55 kg)
- John Smith Award winner

2007

- (bronze) World Cup
- (gold) Pan American Games (55 kg)
- (gold) Pan American Championships
- (gold) U.S. World Team Trials (55 kg)
- (gold) U.S. Senior National Championship (55 kg)

2006

- (gold) Pan American Championships
- (silver) U.S. World Team Trials (55 kg)
- (gold) U.S. Senior National Championship (55 kg)
- Real American Freestyle
  - RAF Lightweight Crossover Championship (First, current)
  - Match of the Night (One time) vs. Merab Dvalishvili 1

== Mixed martial arts record ==
Professional record breakdown
22 matches	16 wins	6 losses
By knockout	8	1
By decision	8	5

Res.	Record	Opponent	Method	Event	Date	Round	Time	Location	Notes
Loss	16–6	Payton Talbott	Decision (unanimous)	UFC 323	December 6, 2025	3	5:00	Las Vegas, Nevada, United States	
Loss	16–5	Song Yadong	Technical Decision (unanimous)	UFC Fight Night: Cejudo vs. Song	February 22, 2025	3	5:00	Seattle, Washington, United States	An eye injury due to an accidental eye poke rendered Cejudo unable to continue.
Loss	16–4	Merab Dvalishvili	Decision (unanimous)	UFC 298	February 17, 2024	3	5:00	Anaheim, California, United States	
Loss	16–3	Aljamain Sterling	Decision (split)	UFC 288	May 6, 2023	5	5:00	Newark, New Jersey, United States	For the UFC Bantamweight Championship.
Win	16–2	Dominick Cruz	TKO (knee and punches)	UFC 249	May 9, 2020	2	4:58	Jacksonville, Florida, United States	Defended the UFC Bantamweight Championship. Cejudo vacated the title on May 24, 2020 after his retirement.
Win	15–2	Marlon Moraes	TKO (punches)	UFC 238	June 8, 2019	3	4:51	Chicago, Illinois, United States	Won the vacant UFC Bantamweight Championship. Performance of the Night.
Win	14–2	T.J. Dillashaw	TKO (punches)	UFC Fight Night: Cejudo vs. Dillashaw	January 19, 2019	1	0:32	Brooklyn, New York, United States	Defended the UFC Flyweight Championship. Performance of the Night. Dillashaw tested positive in pre and post-fight drug tests for erythropoietin (EPO). Cejudo vacated the title on February 29, 2020.
Win	13–2	Demetrious Johnson	Decision (split)	UFC 227	August 4, 2018	5	5:00	Los Angeles, California, United States	Won the UFC Flyweight Championship. Fight of the Night.
Win	12–2	Sergio Pettis	Decision (unanimous)	UFC 218	December 2, 2017	3	5:00	Detroit, Michigan, United States	
Win	11–2	Wilson Reis	TKO (punches)	UFC 215	September 9, 2017	2	0:25	Edmonton, Alberta, Canada	Performance of the Night.
Loss	10–2	Joseph Benavidez	Decision (split)	The Ultimate Fighter: Tournament of Champions Finale	December 3, 2016	3	5:00	Las Vegas, Nevada, United States	Cejudo was deducted one point in round 1 due to repeated low blows.
Loss	10–1	Demetrious Johnson	TKO (knees to the body)	UFC 197	April 23, 2016	1	2:49	Las Vegas, Nevada, United States	For the UFC Flyweight Championship.
Win	10–0	Jussier Formiga	Decision (split)	The Ultimate Fighter Latin America 2 Finale: Magny vs. Gastelum	November 21, 2015	3	5:00	Monterrey, Mexico	
Win	9–0	Chico Camus	Decision (unanimous)	UFC 188	June 13, 2015	3	5:00	Mexico City, Mexico	
Win	8–0	Chris Cariaso	Decision (unanimous)	UFC 185	March 14, 2015	3	5:00	Dallas, Texas, United States	
Win	7–0	Dustin Kimura	Decision (unanimous)	UFC on Fox: dos Santos vs. Miocic	December 13, 2014	3	5:00	Phoenix, Arizona, United States	Bantamweight bout.
Win	6–0	Elias Garcia	Decision (unanimous)	Legacy FC 27	January 31, 2014	3	5:00	Houston, Texas, United States	Flyweight debut; Cejudo missed weight (128.5 lb).
Win	5–0	Ryan Hollis	Decision (unanimous)	Legacy FC 24	October 11, 2013	3	5:00	Dallas, Texas, United States	Catchweight (128 lb) bout.
Win	4–0	Miguelito Marti	TKO (punches)	Gladiator Challenge: American Dream	May 18, 2013	1	1:43	Lincoln, California, United States	
Win	3–0	Anthony Sessions	TKO (punches)	World Fighting Federation 10	April 19, 2013	1	4:23	Chandler, Arizona, United States	Won the vacant WFF Bantamweight Championship.
Win	2–0	Sean Henry Barnett	TKO (punches)	Gladiator Challenge: Battleground	March 24, 2013	1	4:55	San Jacinto, California, United States	
Win	1–0	Michael Poe	TKO (submission to punches)	World Fighting Federation: Pascua Yaqui Fights 4	March 2, 2013	1	1:25	Tucson, Arizona, United States	Bantamweight debut.

== Freestyle record ==
Senior Freestyle Matches
Res.	Record	Opponent	Score	Date	Event	Location
Win	44–12	(Georgia (country)) Merab Dvalishvili	Fall	August 22, 2026	RAF 12	(United States) Cleveland, Ohio
Loss	43–12	(Georgia (country)) Merab Dvalishvili	8-11	July 11, 2026	RAF Georgia	(Georgia (country)) Tbilisi, Georgia
Win	43–11	(United States) Urijah Faber	TF 11–0	February 28, 2026	RAF 06	(United States) Tempe, Arizona
Loss	42–11	(United States) Tony Ramos	8–10	April 4, 2015	2015 Agon V: Iowa against the World	(United States) Iowa City, Iowa
2012 US Olympic Team Trials 5th at 55 kg
Loss	42–10	(United States) Nick Simmons	0–3, 9–5, 2–5	April 21, 2012	2012 US Olympic Team Trials	(United States) Iowa City, Iowa
Win	42–9	(United States) Obe Blanc	1–0, 2–0	April 21, 2012	2012 US Olympic Team Trials	(United States) Iowa City, Iowa
Win	41–9	(United States) Earl Hall	1–1, 5–3	April 21, 2012	2012 US Olympic Team Trials	(United States) Iowa City, Iowa
2011 Henri Deglane (silver) at 55 kg
Loss	40–9	(Monaco) Ghenadie Tulbea	1–3, 2–6	November 26, 2011	2011 Henri Deglane Challenge	Nice, France
Win	40–8	(Spain) Rodrigo Rodriguez	2–0, 6–0	November 26, 2011	2011 Henri Deglane Challenge	Nice, France
Win	39–8	(France) Chakir Ansari	4–0, 2–2, 2–1	November 26, 2011	2011 Henri Deglane Challenge	Nice, France
2011 Sunkist Open (gold) at 55 kg
Win	38–8	(United States) Danny Felix	1–0, 1–0	October 28, 2011	2011 Sunkist International Open	(United States) Mesa, Arizona
Win	37–8	(Uzbekistan) Jarrod Patterson	4–0, 8–2	October 28, 2011	2011 Sunkist International Open	(United States) Mesa, Arizona
Win	36–8	(Canada) Aso Palani	2–0, 3–2	October 28, 2011	2011 Sunkist International Open	(United States) Mesa, Arizona
Win	35–8	(United States) Ben Kjar	1–0, 1–0	October 28, 2011	2011 Sunkist International Open	(United States) Mesa, Arizona
Win	34–8	(Russia) Rasul Mashezov	2–0, 4–3	May 5, 2011	2011 Beat The Streets: USA vs. Russia	(United States) New York City, New York
2008 Summer Olympics (gold) at 55 kg
Win	33–8	(Japan) Tomohiro Matsunaga	2–2, 3–0	August 19, 2008	2008 Summer Olympics	Beijing, China
Win	32–8	(Azerbaijan) Namig Sevdimov	3–5, 3–2, 4–3	August 19, 2008	2008 Summer Olympics	Beijing, China
Win	31–8	(Georgia (country)) Besarion Gochashvili	1–3, 3–2, 3–0	August 19, 2008	2008 Summer Olympics	Beijing, China
Win	30–8	(Bulgaria) Radoslav Velikov	0–1, 3–2, 4–3	August 19, 2008	2008 Summer Olympics	Beijing, China
2008 US Olympic Team Trials (gold) at 55 kg
Win	29–8	(United States) Stephen Abas	0–1, 3–0, 3–0	June 15, 2008	2008 US Olympic Team Trials	(United States) Las Vegas, Nevada
Loss	28–8	(United States) Stephen Abas	0–2, 3–6	June 15, 2008	2008 US Olympic Team Trials	(United States) Las Vegas, Nevada
Win	28–7	(United States) Stephen Abas	3–2, 4–0	June 15, 2008	2008 US Olympic Team Trials	(United States) Las Vegas, Nevada
Win	27–7	(United States) Danny Felix	1–0, 1–0	June 15, 2008	2008 US Olympic Team Trials Challenge Tournament	(United States) Las Vegas, Nevada
Win	26–7	(United States) Grant Nakamura	5–0, 6–1	June 15, 2008	2008 US Olympic Team Trials Challenge Tournament	(United States) Las Vegas, Nevada
2008 US Nationals (silver) at 55 kg
Loss	25–7	(United States) Matt Azevedo	Fall	April 26, 2008	2008 US Senior National Wrestling Championships	(United States) Las Vegas, Nevada
Win	25–6	(United States) Danny Felix	1–0, 3–0	April 26, 2008	2008 US Senior National Wrestling Championships	(United States) Las Vegas, Nevada
Win	24–6	(United States) Obe Blanc	1–0, 3–0	April 26, 2008	2008 US Senior National Wrestling Championships	(United States) Las Vegas, Nevada
Win	23–6	(United States) Kelly Martinez	TF 7–0, 7–0	April 26, 2008	2008 US Senior National Wrestling Championships	(United States) Las Vegas, Nevada
2008 Pan American Championships (gold) at 55 kg
Win	22–6	(Cuba) Andy Gonzalez	Fall	March 2, 2008	2008 Pan American Wrestling Championships	Colorado, United States
Win	21–6	(Brazil) Vinicius Pedrosa	TF 6–0, 7–0	March 2, 2008	2008 Pan American Wrestling Championships	Colorado, United States
Win	20–6	(Canada) John Pineda	2–1, 2–2	March 2, 2008	2008 Pan American Wrestling Championships	Colorado, United States
2007 World Championships 31st at 55kg
Loss	19–6	(Iran) Taghi Dadashi	0–1, 0–4	September 17, 2007	2007 World Wrestling Championships	Baku, Azerbaijan
2007 Pan American Games (gold) at 55 kg
Win	19–5	(Cuba) Andy Moreno	N/A	August 14, 2007	2007 Pan American Games	Rio de Janeiro, Brazil
2007 US World Team Trials (gold) at 55 kg
Win	18–5	(United States) Matt Azevedo	4–1, 1–0	June 10, 2007	2007 US World Team Trials	(United States) Las Vegas, Nevada
Win	17–5	(United States) Matt Azevedo	3–4, 3–3, 2–0	June 10, 2007	2007 US World Team Trials	(United States) Las Vegas, Nevada
2007 Pan American Championships (gold) at 55 kg
Win	16–5	(Colombia) Fredy Serrano	N/A	May 18, 2007	2007 Pan American Championships	San Salvador, El Salvador
2007 US Nationals (gold) at 55 kg
Win	15–5	(United States) Nick Simmons	4–4, 4–3, 5–0	April 7, 2007	2007 US Senior National Wrestling Championships	(United States) Las Vegas, Nevada
Win	14–5	(United States) Vic Moreno	2–1, 1–1, 2–1	April 7, 2007	2007 US Senior National Wrestling Championships	(United States) Las Vegas, Nevada
Win	13–5	(United States) Patrick McCaffery	1–0, 1–0	April 7, 2007	2007 US Senior National Wrestling Championships	(United States) Las Vegas, Nevada
Win	12–5	(United States) Michael Martinez	1–0, 3–0	April 7, 2007	2007 US Senior National Wrestling Championships	(United States) Las Vegas, Nevada
2006 Sunkist Open at 55 kg
Loss	11–5	(Uzbekistan) Erkin Tadzhimetov	1–4, 0–1	October 14, 2006	2006 Sunkist International Open	Arizona, United States
Win	11–4	(Canada) Jamie Macari	2–2, 6–0	October 14, 2006	2006 Sunkist International Open	Arizona, United States
2006 US World Team Trials (silver) at 55 kg
Loss	10–4	(United States) Sammie Henson	0–2, 2–3	June 28, 2006	2006 US World Team Trials	Iowa, United States
Loss	10–3	(United States) Sammie Henson	3–1, 1–3, 0–2	June 28, 2006	2006 US World Team Trials	Iowa, United States
Win	10–2	(United States) Luke Eustice	2–4, 3–2, 2–2	June 28, 2006	2006 US World Team Trials Challenge Tournament	Iowa, United States
Win	9–2	(Puerto Rico) Franklin Gómez	0–1, 2–1, 3–1	June 28, 2006	2006 US World Team Trials Challenge Tournament	Iowa, United States
2006 Pan American Championships (gold) at 55 kg
Win	8–2	(Cuba) Luis Ibáñez	N/A	May 31, 2006	2006 Pan American Championships	Rio de Janeiro, Brazil
2006 US Nationals (gold) at 55 kg
Win	7–2	(United States) Matt Azevedo	0–1, 2–1, 4–2	April 15, 2006	2006 US Senior National Wrestling Championships	(United States) Las Vegas, Nevada
Win	6–2	(United States) Luke Eustice	2–2, 3–1	April 15, 2006	2006 US Senior National Wrestling Championships	(United States) Las Vegas, Nevada
Win	5–2	(United States) Mark Mcknight	2–2, 1–1	April 15, 2006	2006 US Senior National Wrestling Championships	(United States) Las Vegas, Nevada
Win	4–2	(United States) Grant Nakamura	7–0, 2–1	April 15, 2006	2006 US Senior National Wrestling Championships	(United States) Las Vegas, Nevada
2005 Sunkist Open 5th at 55 kg
Win	3–2	(United States) Jeremy Mendoza	1–0, 4–0	October 23, 2005	2005 Sunkist International Open	Arizona, United States
Loss	2–2	(United States) Matt Azevedo	0–2, 1–0, 2–4	October 23, 2005	2005 Sunkist International Open	Arizona, United States
Loss	2–1	(United States) Luke Eustice	0–3, 0–1	October 23, 2005	2005 Sunkist International Open	Arizona, United States
Win	2–0	(United States) Tanner Gardner	1–6, 7–0, 5–3	October 23, 2005	2005 Sunkist International Open	Arizona, United States
Win	1–0	(United States) Jason Powell	4–0, 3–4, 8–2	October 23, 2005	2005 Sunkist International Open	Arizona, United States

== Professional boxing record ==
1 fight	1 win	0 losses
By decision	1	0

No.	Result	Record	Opponent	Type	Round, time	Date	Location	Notes
1	Win	1–0	Javon Walton	SD	4	Sep 26, 2026	James L. Knight Center, Miami, Florida, U.S.	

== Pay-per-view bouts ==
No	Event	Fight	Date	Venue	City	PPV buys
1.	UFC 238	Cejudo vs. Moraes	June 8, 2019	United Center	Chicago, Illinois, United States	Not Disclosed
2.	UFC 288	Sterling vs. Cejudo	May 6, 2023	Prudential Center	Newark, New Jersey, United States	200k-250k (per Aljamain Sterling)

== See also ==
- Double champions in MMA
- List of current UFC fighters
- List of male mixed martial artists
- List of multi-sport athletes
- List of multi-sport champions
- List of UFC champions

Awards and achievements
Preceded by Demetrious Johnson	2nd UFC Flyweight Champion; August 4, 2018 – February 29, 2020; Vacated	Vacant Title next held by Deiveson Figueiredo
Vacant Title last held by T.J. Dillashaw	7th UFC Bantamweight Champion; June 8, 2019 - May 24, 2020; Vacated	Vacant Title next held by Petr Yan
