= Angel Escobedo =

American wrestler (born 1987)

Personal information
- Born: January 12, 1987 (age 39) Griffith, Indiana, U.S.
Medal record
Men's freestyle wrestling
Representing the United States
World Cup
Silver medal – second place	2014 Los Angeles	Team
Pan American Games
Silver medal – second place	2015 Toronto	57 kg
Golden Grand Prix
Bronze medal – third place	2010 Baku	55 kg
Men's collegiate wrestling
Representing the Indiana Hoosiers
NCAA Division I Championships
Gold medal – first place	2008 St. Louis	125 lb
Bronze medal – third place	2010 Omaha	125 lb
Big Ten Championships
Gold medal – first place	2008 Minneapolis	125 lb
Gold medal – first place	2009 State College	125 lb
Gold medal – first place	2010 Ann Arbor	125 lb
Bronze medal – third place	2007 East Lansing	125 lb

Angel Escobedo (born January 12, 1987) is an American former folkstyle and freestyle wrestler, and is the head wrestling coach at Indiana University. Escobedo won an NCAA Wrestling championship in 2008 and placed fifth at the World Wrestling Championships in 2013.

== Early life ==
Escobedo is from Griffith, Indiana.

== College career ==
Escobedo competed for the wrestling team at Indiana University. While there, he won an NCAA Division I championship, and placed in the top five nationwide all four years he competed. Escobedo was the first wrestler from Indiana University to ever place in the top eight four times.

== Freestyle career ==
At the 2013 World Team Trials Escobedo finished 2nd, but was promoted to compete on the US World Championships team when Obe Blanc failed a drug test.

At the 2013 World Wrestling Championships Escobedo advanced to the bronze medal match in the 55 kg division. Escobedo ultimately lost in the bronze medal match by one point to Sezar Akgül of Turkey.

== Match results ==
World Championships Matches
Res.	Record	Opponent	Score	Date	Event	Location
2013 UWW 5th at 55 kg
Loss	3-2	(Turkey) Sezar Akgül	1-2	September 16, 2013	2013 World Wrestling Championships	Budapest, Hungary
Win	3-1	(France) Zoheir El-Ouarraqe	8-2	September 16, 2013	2013 World Wrestling Championships	Budapest, Hungary
Loss	2-1	(India) Amit Kumar Dahiya	0-6	September 16, 2013	2013 World Wrestling Championships	Budapest, Hungary
Win	2-0	(Hungary) Róbert Kardos	8-0	September 16, 2013	2013 World Wrestling Championships	Budapest, Hungary
Win	1-0	(Romania) Andrei Dukov	6-0	September 16, 2013	2013 World Wrestling Championships	Budapest, Hungary

== Awards and honors ==
2015

- (silver) Pan American Games
- (bronze) Dave Schultz Memorial International

2013

- (silver) Stepan Sargsyan Tournament

2011

- (gold) New York Athletic Club International
- (silver) FILA Test Tournament

2010

- (bronze) Golden Grand Prix
- (bronze) NCAA Division I
- (gold) Big Ten Conference

2009

- NCAA Division I All American
- (gold) Big Ten Conference

2008

- (gold) NCAA Division I
- (gold) Big Ten Conference

2007

- NCAA Division I All American
- (bronze) Big Ten Conference
