= Dabbaghi =

Dabbaghi (Persian: دباغی) is a Persian surname. Notable people with the surname include:

- Abbas Dabbaghi (born 1987), Iranian wrestler
- Hajar Dabbaghi (born 1999), Iranian football player
