= Golden Grand Prix Ivan Yarygin 2017 – Men's freestyle 57 kg =

The men's freestyle 57 kg is a competition featured at the Golden Grand Prix Ivan Yarygin 2017, and was held in Krasnoyarsk, Russia on January 27.

== Medalists ==
Gold	(Dagestan) Zaur Uguev
Silver	(Dagestan) Artem Gebekov
Bronze	(Dagestan) Zelimkhan Abakarov
Bronze	(Dagestan) Nariman Israpilov

== Results ==
Legend

- F — Won by fall

=== Final ===
Final
(Dagestan) Artem Gebekov	0
(Dagestan) Zaur Uguev	10

=== Top half ===
Round of 32
(Japan) Yuki Takahashi	2
(Dagestan) Abasgadzhi Magomedov	8
(Tuva) Khuresh-ool Donduk-ool Toitu	1
(Dagestan) Zelimkhan Abakarov	1
(Kazakhstan) Aidarbek Baimuratov	0
(Dagestan) Artem Gebekov	11
(Tuva) Omak Syuryun	3
(Dagestan) Khassanhussein Badrudionov	10

Round of 16
(Iran) Reza Atranagharchi	5
(Abkhazia) Rustam Ampar	7
(Dagestan) Rasul Meshezov	5
(Sakha Republic) Georgi Okorokov	0
(Dagestan) Abasgadzhi Magomedov	1
(Dagestan) Zelimkhan Abakarov	9
(Dagestan) Artem Gebekov	2
(Dagestan) Khassanhussein Badrudionov	2

Quarterfinals
(Abkhazia) Rustam Ampar	3
(Dagestan) Rasul Meshezov	4
(Dagestan) Zelimkhan Abakarov	0
(Dagestan) Artem Gebekov	2

Semifinals
(Dagestan) Rasul Meshezov	3
(Dagestan) Artem Gebekov	6

=== Bottom half ===
Round of 32
(Japan) Gaku Akazawa	0
(Sakha Republic) Nyurgun Aleksandrov	10
(Japan) Toshihiro Hasegawa	8
(Sakha Republic) Aryaan Tyutrin	8
(Dagestan) Zaur Uguev	11
(Dagestan) Magomedrasul Idrisov	0
(Mongolia) Dala Batsaikhan	8
(Krasnoyarsk Krai) Nurtilek Ermekbaev	15
(Mongolia) Manukh-Erdene Altansuvd	4
(Buryatia) Aldar Balzhinimaev	5
(North Ossetia–Alania) Azamat Tuskaev	10
(Kazakhstan) Abil Ussin	0
(Sakha Republic) Vladimir Flegontov	6
(Dagestan) Nariman Israpilov	16
(Kaliningrad Oblast) Ibragim Ilyasov	2
(Sakha Republic) Eduard Grigorev	12

Round of 16
(Sakha Republic) Nyurgun Aleksandrov	7
(Sakha Republic) Aryaan Tyutrin	13
(Dagestan) Zaur Uguev	12
(Krasnoyarsk Krai) Nurtilek Ermekbaev	1
(Buryatia) Aldar Balzhinimaev	1
(North Ossetia–Alania) Azamat Tuskaev	12
(Dagestan) Nariman Israpilov	11
(Sakha Republic) Eduard Grigorev	0

Quarterfinals
(Sakha Republic) Aryaan Tyutrin	2
(Dagestan) Zaur Uguev	8
(North Ossetia–Alania) Azamat Tuskaev	3
(Dagestan) Nariman Israpilov	5

Semifinals
(Dagestan) Zaur Uguev	8
(Dagestan) Nariman Israpilov	3

=== Repechage ===
Repechage round 1
-
-
(Dagestan) Magomedrasul Idrisov	7
(Krasnoyarsk Krai) Nurtilek Ermekbaev	5

Repechage round 2
(Dagestan) Zelimkhan Abakarov	10
(Dagestan) Khassanhussein Badrudionov	1
(Dagestan) Magomedrasul Idrisov	9
(Sakha Republic) Aryaan Tyutrin	6

Bronze medals
(Dagestan) Rasul Meshezov	3
(Dagestan) Zelimkhan Abakarov	5
(Dagestan) Magomedrasul Idrisov	2
(Dagestan) Nariman Israpilov	11
