= Besarion Gochashvili =

Georgian wrestler

Medal record

Men's Freestyle wrestling

Representing Georgia

European Championships
Silver medal – second place	2012 Belgrade	55 kg

Besarion Gochashvili (born February 6, 1983, in Tbilisi) is a male freestyle wrestler from Georgia. He participated in Men's freestyle 55 kg at 2008 Summer Olympics. After beating Romanian Petru Toarca he lost with Henry Cejudo. In the repechage round he was eliminated by Radoslav Velikov.
