= Nariman Israpilov =

Russian wrestler (born 1988)

Nariman Israpilov Нариман Исрапилов
Personal information
- Native name: Нариман Магомедович Исрапилов
- Full name: Nariman Magomedovich Israpilov
- Nationality: Russia
- Born: February 23, 1988 (age 38) Kayakent, Dagestan, Russia
- Height: 1.60 m (5 ft 3 in)

Sport
- Country: Russia
- Sport: Sport wrestling
- Weight class: 55 kg
- Event: Freestyle
- Club: Kayakent wrestling club
- Coached by: Magomed Magomedov, Gaidar Gaidarov
Medal record
Men's Freestyle Wrestling
Representing Russia
World Championships
Bronze medal – third place	2013 Budapest	55 kg
European Championships
Gold medal – first place	2009 Vilnius	55 kg
Summer Universiade
Gold medal – first place	2013 Kazan	55 kg
Russian National Championships
Gold medal – first place	2013 Krasnoyarsk	55 kg
Gold medal – first place	2006 Nishnevartovsk	50 kg
Bronze medal – third place	2015 Kaspiisk	57 kg
Bronze medal – third place	2012 St.Petersburg	55 kg
Bronze medal – third place	2011 Yakutsk	55 kg
Bronze medal – third place	2009 Kazan	55 kg
Golden Grand Prix Ivan Yarygin
Gold medal – first place	2009 Krasnoyarsk	55 kg
Silver medal – second place	2012 Krasnoyarsk	55 kg
Silver medal – second place	2010 Krasnoyarsk	55 kg
Bronze medal – third place	2017 Krasnoyarsk	57 kg
Bronze medal – third place	2014 Krasnoyarsk	57 kg
Ali Aliev Tournament
Silver medal – second place	2017 Kaspiysk	61 kg
Bronze medal – third place	2014 Makhachkala	57 kg
Junior World Championships
Gold medal – first place	2008 Istanbul	55 kg

Nariman Magomedovich Israpilov (Kumyk: Nariman İsrapil Muhammatnı ulanı; Russian: Нариман Магомедович Исрапилов; born 23 February 1988) is a Russian freestyle wrestler. He competes in the 66 kg division and won the gold medal in the same division at the 2013 Summer Universiade defeating Samat Nadyrbek Uulu of Kyrgyzstan.
