= Sezar Akgül =

Turkish freestyle wrestler

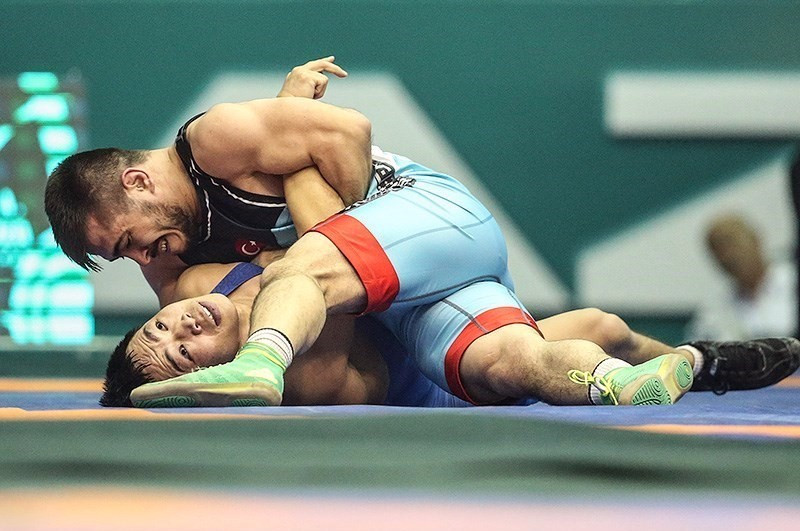
- Sezar Akgül (on top) and Mongolian wrestler Batbold Sodnomdash in Freestyle World Cup 2017

Personal information
- Nationality: Turkish
- Born: 27 April 1988 (age 38) Amasya, Turkey

Sport
- Sport: Sport wrestling
- Event: Freestyle
Medal record
Representing Turkey
Men's Freestyle Wrestling
World Championships
| Bronze medal – third place | 2013 Budapest | 55 kg |
| Silver medal – second place | 2009 Herning | 55 kg |
World Cup
| Gold medal – first place | 2013 Tehran | 55 kg |
European Championships
| Bronze medal – third place | 2013 Tbilisi | 55 kg |
| Bronze medal – third place | 2008 Tampere | 55 kg |
| Bronze medal – third place | 2007 Sofia | 55 kg |
Mediterranean Games
| Gold medal – first place | 2009 Pescara | 55 kg |

Sezar Akgul, aka Sezer Akgül, (born on 27 April 1988 in Amasya) is a freestyle wrestler from Turkey.

He won a bronze medal at the 2007 European Wrestling Championships held in Sofia, Bulgaria and again at the 2008 European Wrestling Championships in Tampere, Finland. He also won silver medal at the 2009 FILA Wrestling World Championships.

Sezar Akgül participated in Men's freestyle 55 kg at 2008 Summer Olympics. In 1/8 of final, he lost to Japanese Tomohiro Matsunaga. In the repechage round after beating Adama Diatta from Senegal, he was eliminated by Dilshod Mansurov (Uzbekistan).

He won the gold medal in the freestyle 55 kg event at the 2009 Mediterranean Games held in Pescara, Italy.

In 2013, he repeated his European bronze medal title at the championships held in Tbilisi, Georgia. at the 2013 World Wrestling Championships in Budapest, Hungary, he won the bronze medal.

In June 2015, he competed in the inaugural European Games, for Turkey in wrestling, more specifically, Men's freestyle in the 57 kilogram range. He earned a bronze medal.
