= 2013 World Wrestling Championships – Men's freestyle 55 kg =

Men's freestyle 55 kg at the 2013 World Championships
- Venue: László Papp Budapest Sports Arena
- Dates: 16 September 2013
- Competitors: 34 from 34 nations

Medalists
gold medal	Hassan Rahimi	Iran
silver medal	Amit Kumar Dahiya	India
bronze medal	Sezar Akgül	Turkey
bronze medal	Nariman Israpilov	Russia

The men's freestyle 55 kilograms is a competition featured at the 2013 World Wrestling Championships, and was held at the László Papp Budapest Sports Arena in Budapest, Hungary on 16 September 2013.

== Results ==
Legend

- F — Won by fall

=== Finals ===
Semifinals		Final
Amit Kumar Dahiya (IND)	8
Sezar Akgül (TUR)	0	Amit Kumar Dahiya (IND)	1
Hassan Rahimi (IRI)	9	Hassan Rahimi (IRI)	2
Nariman Israpilov (RUS)	0

=== Top half ===
==== Section 1 ====
Round of 64

Round of 32
Zoheir El-Ouarraqe (FRA)	7
Hong Xiaobin (CHN)	2
Amit Kumar Dahiya (IND)	10
Yasuhiro Inaba (JPN)	2
Róbert Kardos (HUN)	8
Šarūnas Jurčys (LTU)	5
Angel Escobedo (USA)	6
Andrei Dukov (ROU)	0

Round of 16
Zoheir El-Ouarraqe (FRA)	0
Amit Kumar Dahiya (IND)	8
Róbert Kardos (HUN)	0
Angel Escobedo (USA)	8

Quarterfinals
Amit Kumar Dahiya (IND)	6
Angel Escobedo (USA)	0

==== Section 2 ====
Round of 64

Round of 32
Erdenebatyn Bekhbayar (MGL)	4
Yashar Aliyev (AZE)	2
Pedro Mejías (VEN)	7
Aso Palani (CAN)	0
Nodirjon Safarov (UZB)	2
Sezar Akgül (TUR)	7
Peiris Madusanka (SRI)	0
Clim Grec (MDA)	7

Round of 16
Erdenebatyn Bekhbayar (MGL)	6
Pedro Mejías (VEN)	0
Sezar Akgül (TUR)	3^{F}
Clim Grec (MDA)	0

Quarterfinals
Erdenebatyn Bekhbayar (MGL)	3
Sezar Akgül (TUR)	3

=== Bottom half ===
==== Section 3 ====
Round of 64

Round of 32
Rassul Kaliyev (KAZ)	0
Hassan Rahimi (IRI)	7^{F}
Uladzislau Andreyeu (BLR)	3
Kim Sung-gwon (KOR)	6
Altynbek Alymbaev (KGZ)	11
Brandon Escobar (HON)	4
Bienvenu Andriamalala (MAD)	6
Armen Arakelyan (UKR)	15

Round of 16
Hassan Rahimi (IRI)	9
Kim Sung-gwon (KOR)	2
Altynbek Alymbaev (KGZ)	9
Armen Arakelyan (UKR)	0

Quarterfinals
Hassan Rahimi (IRI)	7
Altynbek Alymbaev (KGZ)	0

==== Section 4 ====
Round of 64
Ivan Djorev (BUL)	8
Hel Here (CHA)	0
Marcel Ewald (GER)	6
Marco Coetzee (RSA)	2

Round of 32
Nguyễn Huy Hà (VIE)	0
Levan Metreveli (ESP)	7
Mihran Jaburyan (ARM)	2
Giorgi Edisherashvili (GEO)	6
Nariman Israpilov (RUS)	12
Yang Kyong-il (PRK)	8
Ivan Djorev (BUL)	1
Marcel Ewald (GER)	2

Round of 16
Levan Metreveli (ESP)	1
Giorgi Edisherashvili (GEO)	4
Nariman Israpilov (RUS)	8
Marcel Ewald (GER)	0

Quarterfinals
Giorgi Edisherashvili (GEO)	15
Nariman Israpilov (RUS)	19

=== Repechage ===
Repechage round 2
Yasuhiro Inaba (JPN)	4
Zoheir El-Ouarraqe (FRA)	3^{F}
Rassul Kaliyev (KAZ)	7
Kim Sung-gwon (KOR)	0

Repechage round 3
Zoheir El-Ouarraqe (FRA)	2
Angel Escobedo (USA)	8
Rassul Kaliyev (KAZ)	9
Altynbek Alymbaev (KGZ)	1

Bronze medals
Angel Escobedo (USA)	1
Sezar Akgül (TUR)	2
Rassul Kaliyev (KAZ)	0
Nariman Israpilov (RUS)	8^{F}
