= Angel Cejudo =

American freestyle wrestler

- Angel Cejudo (right) in 2010

Sport
- Sport: Freestyle wrestling
- Club: U.S. Army WCAP

Angel Cejudo is an American freestyle wrestler who won the Dave Schultz Memorial International freestyle wrestling tournament in the 60 kg (132 lbs) weight class on February 5, 2008. Later that same year he trained with his brother Henry Cejudo in Colorado Springs, who would win an Olympic gold medal at the 2008 Beijing Olympics.

== Wrestling career ==
Angel Cejudo went 150–0 for Phoenix Maryvale High School in Phoenix, Arizona on the way to four 5A state titles. In 2005, he turned down a scholarship at Arizona State University to work out at the U.S. Olympic Training Center full-time.

Angel Cejudo and his brother Henry earned spots on the 2005 FILA Junior Freestyle World Team. At 60 kg/132 lbs., Angel Cejudo (Colorado Springs, Colo./Sunkist Kids) beat Drew Headlee (Waynesburg, Pa./Pitt WC). In bout one, Angel Cejudo defeated Drew Headlee of Waynesburg, PA by pin in 1:58. In the second bout, Angel Cejudo defeated Drew Headlee by dec. 3–0, 1–0. Angel Cejudo won the series, two matches to none. Angel Cejudo is a U.S. Olympic Training Center resident athlete.

On November 20, 2005 and again wrestling at 60 kg, Angel Cejudo (Sunkist) won 3rd place by defeating by dec. Jason Wichinski (Cabbagetown), 2–0, 4–0.

In 2006, he was ranked ninth in the U.S. Senior freestyle ranking by themat.com at the 60 kg weight class.

In 2007, he failed to qualify for the 2007 U.S. World Team Trials in freestyle wrestling.

In 2008, he won the Dave Schultz Memorial International in the 60 kg weight class. Also in 2008, Angel Cejudo entered the U.S. Olympic trials seeded ninth after not placing in the 2008 U.S. Nationals competing for the 60 kg (132 pounds) weight class. Cejudo went 1–2 at the trials in Las Vegas, eliminated by Nate Gallick from Tucson Sunnyside who finished third. The US team did not do well enough in the 60 kg qualifying tournaments to earn a wildcard into the Competition from FILA, the governing board of international wrestling.

== Personal life ==
Angel Cejudo states that his wrestling improved on his way to winning the Dave Schultz Memorial International in the 60 kg weight class after his mother moved to Colorado to be with him and his brother. His brother Henry won the Beijing Olympic Gold medal in 2008 for the 55 kg weight class. Angel Cejudo was in attendance with his sister Gloria and brother Alonzo. His mother was sick and unable to make it, for which he broke the explanation to the media that his mother gets nervous and throws up during the matches.
