= Namig Sevdimov =

Azerbaijani freestyle wrestler

Personal information
- Nationality: Azerbaijani
- Born: 23 November 1981 (age 44)

Sport
- Sport: Wrestling
Medal record
Men's freestyle wrestling
Representing Azerbaijan
World Military Championships
Silver medal – second place	2007 Hyderabad	60 kg

Namig Sevdimov (born November 23, 1981, in Baku) is a male freestyle wrestler from Azerbaijan. He participated in Men's freestyle 55 kg at the ⁣⁣2008 Summer Olympics. He was ranked 4th-5th after losing the bronze medal fight against Radoslav Velikov.
