= Eric Albarracin =

American wrestler

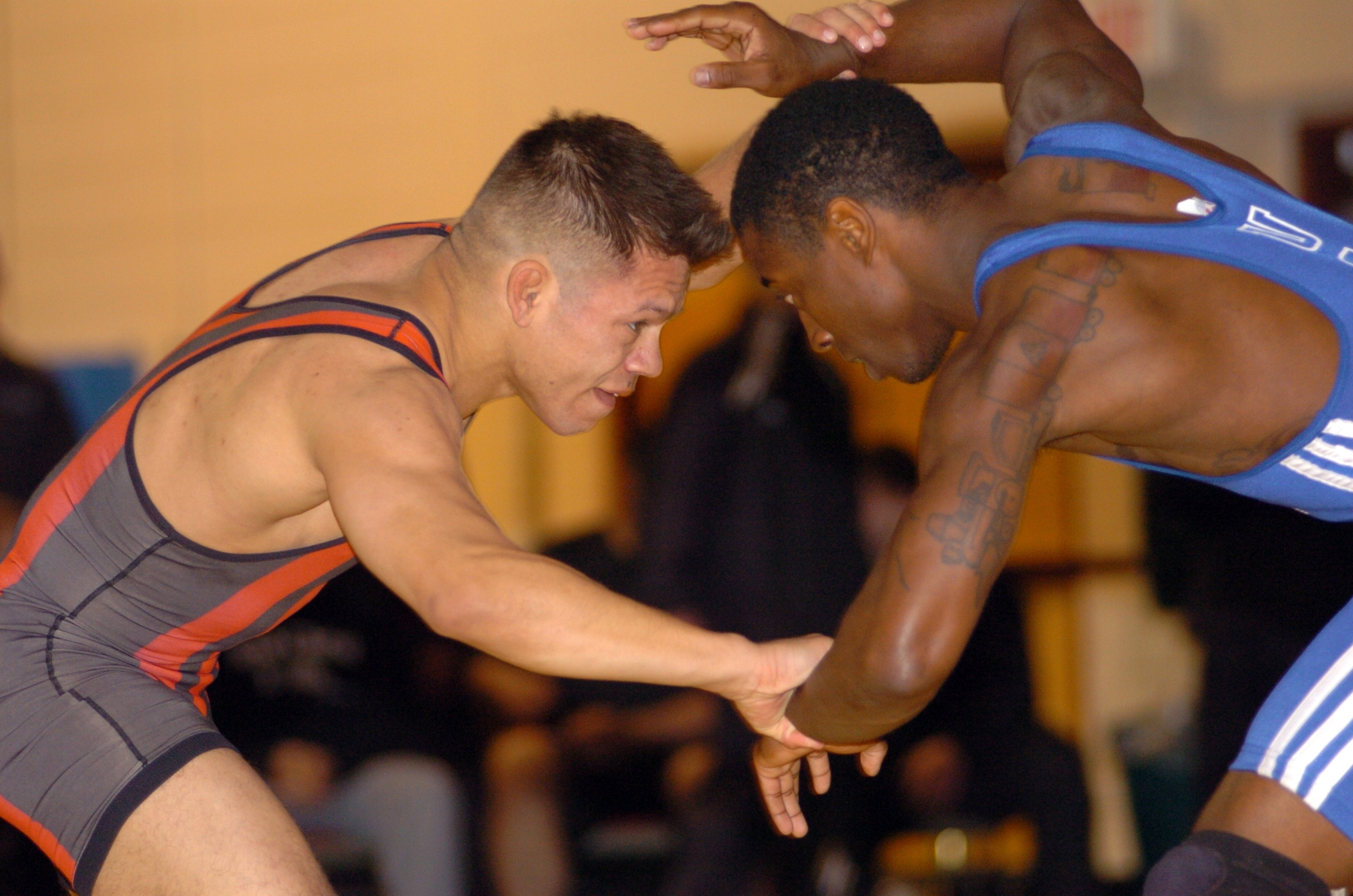
- Eric Albarracin (left) in 2007

Personal information
- Born: 1982 (age 43–44) New York, New York, United States
- Weight: 121 lb (55 kg)

Sport
- Sport: Freestyle wrestling
- Club: U.S. Army
Medal record
Representing the United States
Pan American Championships
Silver medal – second place	1997 San Juan	54 kg
Military World Wrestling Championships
Silver medal – second place	2000 Camp Lejeune	54 kg

Eric Albarracin (born c. 1983), is an American mixed martial arts (MMA) coach and retired wrestler and U.S. Army captain. Nicknamed "Captain Americas", the name reflects his heritage and influence across North, Central, and South America. He is of Colombian descent, his mother is Puerto Rican, and he has coached athletes of Mexican descent including Olympic champion Henry Cejudo, in addition to his long coaching career in Brazil.

Albarracin is a three-time University National Champion, seven-time armed forces champion and three-time Olympic Trials Qualifier Champion. A former member of both the U.S. Freestyle and Greco-Roman national teams, he won international medals at the Pan American Championships, the Military World Wrestling Championships, the Cerro Pelado International Tournament in Cuba, and was a Freestyle Wrestling World Cup Champion (team gold medal). Albarracin won these medals in the freestyle 54 kg division at the Pan American Championships and at the Military World Wrestling Championships.

Transitioning into coaching, Albarracin has trained multiple world champions across the UFC, Bellator, and Rizin. He has coached fighters to at least 17 world titles in the UFC and Bellator, and is recognized as one of the most decorated coaches in modern MMA.

== Career highlights ==
- 3× University National Champion
- 7× Armed Forces Champion
- 3× Olympic Trials Qualifier Champion
- Pan American Championships silver medalist
- Military World Wrestling Championships silver medalist
- Cerro Pelado International bronze medalist (Cuba)
- Freestyle Wrestling World Cup Champion (team gold medal)
- Colorado Springs Winter Classic Champion
- Dave Schultz Memorial International Champion
- 17× UFC & Bellator World Title Coach

== Wrestling career ==
Albarracin began wrestling at Coral Springs High School in Florida, where he was coached by Dan Jacob and Henry Johnson. He became a state runner-up at 103 lbs and was teammates with heavyweight Ray Gould, who later went on to play college football and remains one of Albarracin’s closest lifelong friends.

He walked on at Arizona State University, where he transitioned into elite-level freestyle and Greco-Roman wrestling. There he was coached by Hall of Famer Bobby Douglas, Olympian and Hall of Fame coach, as well as Leroy Smith. He later trained under Tadaki Hatta, whose father Ichiro Hatta was a disciple of Jigoro Kano, the founder of judo. Albarracin often emphasizes that his “wrestling tree” traces directly back to Kano through Hatta and Douglas. He was also coached on the U.S. national team by Olympic and world champion John Smith, widely considered one of the greatest American wrestlers in history.

As a member of the U.S. Army’s World Class Athlete Program (WCAP), Albarracin was coached by Sean Lewis and won the Armed Forces Championship seven times. During his Army service, he became a certified Modern Army Combatives Instructor, a process that required formal instructor training.

Internationally, Albarracin won silver medals at the Pan American Championships and the Military World Wrestling Championships, earned a bronze medal at the prestigious Cerro Pelado International Tournament in Cuba, and was a Freestyle Wrestling World Cup Champion, winning the team gold medal with Team USA. He also won the Colorado Springs Winter Classic and the Dave Schultz Memorial International.

=== Notable wins ===
Albarracin achieved notable victories over:

- NCAA champion and Olympic medalist Stephen Abas (University Nationals final)
- Olympian Tim Vanni (international tournament)
- Five-time U.S. national champion and Olympian Rob Eiter
- NCAA champion and University World champion Teague Moore
- NCAA finalist Cody Sanderson (University Nationals semifinal)
- U.S. national champion Matt Azevedo
- Olympian Joe Betterman
- World bronze medalist Lindsey Durlacher
- U.S. national champion Jermaine Hodge
- Junior World champion TJ Hill
- NCAA finalist Mike Mena
- NCAA champion Sheldon Thomas
- Belarus national team member Dmitry Aakhartchenko (USA vs. Belarus international dual)
- European silver medalist Marcel Ewald (Military World Wrestling Championships)

=== Collegiate and club wrestling ===
During his college years, Albarracin was teammates and roommates with several future legends, including Dan Henderson, who went on to become a PRIDE and Strikeforce champion, and shared training mats with Olympic champion and WWE star Kurt Angle, Olympic gold medalist Rulon Gardner, NCAA champion and PRIDE heavyweight champion Mark Kerr, and future WWE and MMA star Bobby Lashley.

Albarracin competed as a member of the California Jets wrestling club, coached by World Cup champion Bob Anderson, where his teammates included Henderson and Heath Sims. He later became a member of the world-renowned Sunkist Kids Wrestling Club, one of the most successful clubs in U.S. history, led by philanthropist Art Martori. Sunkist Kids has produced numerous Olympic and world champions, including Albarracin’s teammates Randy Couture (UFC Hall of Famer and multi-division UFC champion) and Henderson. Albarracin credits his time with the program as formative to his wrestling and coaching career.

He also served as the lead training partner for Zeke Jones, one of the most accomplished American freestyle wrestlers in history. Jones was an Olympic silver medalist, world bronze medalist, and world champion, and Albarracin worked with him closely through his championship runs as a national team member.

=== Coaching roots and wrestling lineage ===
Albarracin’s early influence extended to future legends. He served as an assistant clinician with Marco Sanchez at the Sanderson wrestling camps while Cody and Cael Sanderson were in high school. Cody later became a top NCAA coach, while Cael Sanderson became an Olympic champion and four-time undefeated NCAA champion. Albarracin also defeated Cody Sanderson in the semifinals of the University Nationals.

He was also one of the main training partners of Norifumi “Kid” Yamamoto, who trained as a high school exchange student in Arizona before becoming a three-time state champion and later a Japanese MMA legend. Albarracin also trained with Kid’s sister Miyu Yamamoto, a multiple-time world champion, and Seiko Yamamoto, another world-class wrestler who later married professional baseball pitcher Yu Darvish. The Yamamoto family is regarded as one of the most famous sporting dynasties in Japan, and Albarracin was part of their early development.

Albarracin also trained with Tricia Saunders, the first female wrestler in U.S. history to become a four-time world champion. He was present at the Olympic Training Center when a young Henry Cejudo first arrived, underscoring his long history of mentoring athletes who went on to become world champions. In 2023, Albarracin presented Cejudo with his induction plaque as the youngest member of the National Wrestling Hall of Fame.

Albarracin later extended his coaching influence internationally, running training sessions in Japan during Patricky Pitbull’s Rizin camp and appearing in filmed practices with Mikuru Asakura, one of Japan’s most popular MMA stars. He also helped coach Kazuma Kuramoto, a Japanese Greco-Roman wrestler who later became the Knockout MMA champion. Kuramoto and his wife, an Olympic champion in wrestling, are considered a “super couple” in Japanese sports.

=== Olympic Training Center residency ===
Albarracin was one of the first athletes recruited into the Olympic Training Center freestyle residency program in Colorado Springs. His teammates included Olympic champion Brandon Slay, Olympian Kerry McCoy, Dan St. John, Jason Kraft, Dean Morrison, Mike Van Arsdale, and Chris Bollin.

He trained under legendary coaches such as:

- Bruce Burnett – U.S. National Team head coach, world champion coach
- Kevin Jackson – Olympic champion, two-time world champion
- Lincoln McIlravy – Olympic medalist, three-time NCAA champion
- Dan Gable – Olympic champion, NCAA coaching legend
- Sergey Beloglazov – two-time Olympic champion, six-time world champion

=== Military service ===
Albarracin served as a U.S. Army captain and was the officer-in-charge of Modern Army Combatives while stationed at Fort Carson, Colorado, a role that marked his final active-duty assignment. He was also a member of the U.S. Army’s World Class Athlete Program (WCAP), where he combined military service with elite-level wrestling competition. During his time in WCAP, Albarracin won the Armed Forces Championships seven times.

== Coaching career ==
Albarracin became widely known as "Captain Americas" for his work with fighters from across the Americas and his ability to craft storylines that elevated athletes into major fights.

=== Team Nogueira era ===
He was first recruited to Team Nogueira in 2011, joining one of the top MMA teams in the world at the time. Albarracin’s first UFC coaching experience came at UFC Rio 1, where Minotauro Nogueira defeated Brendan Schaub and Rogério Nogueira defeated Tito Ortiz. He also coached Rogério Nogueira in his victory over former champion Rashad Evans.

During Albarracin’s tenure with Team Nogueira (2011–2014), the team included multiple world champions and UFC veterans:

- Anderson Silva – UFC middleweight champion; defeated Chael Sonnen
- Minotouro Nogueira – victories over Tito Ortiz and Rashad Evans
- Minotauro Nogueira – victory at UFC Rio 1 over Brendan Schaub
- Feijão Cavalcante – victory over Yoel Romero
- Junior dos Santos – UFC heavyweight champion; defeated Cain Velasquez for the world title
- Erick Silva – UFC welterweight contender
- Antônio "Bigfoot" Silva – UFC heavyweight contender and former EliteXC champion
- Fábio Maldonado – UFC light heavyweight competitor and professional boxer
- Wagner Caldeirão – UFC competitor

=== The Ultimate Fighter ===
Albarracin was part of the coaching staff on multiple seasons of The Ultimate Fighter (TUF), both in Brazil and internationally:

- The Ultimate Fighter: Brazil 2 – Head assistant coach, working alongside Minotauro Nogueira.
- The Ultimate Fighter: Brazil 3 – Guest coaching staff member.
- The Ultimate Fighter: Brazil 4 – Guest coaching staff member.
- The Ultimate Fighter: Latin America 2 – Guest coaching staff member.
- The Ultimate Fighter: Tournament of Champions (TUF 24) – Head assistant coach for Team Cejudo.

On TUF 24, Albarracin directly coached fighters including Alexandre Pantoja, Kai Kara-France, and Matt Schnell, all of whom went on to become UFC standouts.

=== Henry Cejudo ===
Albarracin was instrumental in Henry Cejudo’s rise from Olympic gold medalist to UFC double champion. He coined the phrase “from YOAT to GOAT,” describing Cejudo’s path from the “Youngest Olympic Champion of All Time” (YOAT) in wrestling to the “Greatest Combat Athlete of All Time” (GOAT). Albarracin used the title to highlight Cejudo’s unique achievement as an Olympic gold medalist who also captured UFC championships in two different weight classes.

With Albarracin in his corner, Cejudo was also part of several historic UFC “firsts”:

- The very first episode of UFC Destined on ESPN+.
- The first UFC event held after the COVID-19 shutdowns, UFC 249 in Jacksonville, where Cejudo defended his bantamweight title against Dominick Cruz.
- The last fighter to win the UFC’s classic championship belt design and the first to win the redesigned UFC belt.

Cejudo’s victory over T.J. Dillashaw, with Albarracin in his corner, also played a pivotal role in saving the UFC flyweight division after Dillashaw vowed to shut it down if he won. Albarracin was featured prominently in UFC Destined: Cejudo vs. Dillashaw, where his relationship with Cejudo and the creation of the “King of Cringe” persona were highlighted as part of a strategy to bring attention to the flyweight division.

One of Albarracin’s most famous moments as a coach came during Cejudo’s rematch against longtime champion Demetrious Johnson. With the fight tied at two rounds each heading into the fifth and final round, Albarracin delivered what became known as the “Burn the Ships” speech. He told Cejudo: “Burn the ships and take the castle. Take him down, finish him. If he gets back up, knock him out.”

Cejudo responded to the call, controlling the final round and securing a decision victory over Johnson, widely regarded as one of the greatest fighters of all time. The victory ended Johnson’s record-setting reign and cemented Cejudo as UFC flyweight champion.

Albarracin later explained that he had prepared the speech in advance, describing it as his own “Mickey moment,” inspired by the iconic character from the Rocky films. Like Mickey’s corner speeches to Rocky Balboa, Albarracin’s “Burn the Ships” call has been remembered as a defining and cinematic moment in MMA coaching history.

=== Pitbull Brothers legacy ===
Albarracin has been a longtime coach of Brazilian brothers Patricio “Pitbull” Freire and Patricky “Pitbull” Freire, two of the most successful athletes in Bellator history.

Patricio Pitbull is widely recognized as the greatest fighter in Bellator history (“Bellator GOAT”), holding the records for most wins and most fights in the promotion while capturing world titles at both featherweight and lightweight.

Patricky Pitbull, nicknamed the “King of Knockouts,” holds the record for most knockouts in Bellator history and captured the Bellator lightweight world title.

Together, the Pitbull Brothers became the first siblings in MMA history to hold major world championships simultaneously, a milestone Albarracin helped achieve. Their impact was highlighted in a 2019 segment on TMZ Sports, where Albarracin and the brothers were asked who the “baddest brothers in history” were, to which they replied: “The Pitbull Brothers.”

=== Storyline innovations ===
- Bethe Correia – Coached her to become the first Brazilian female to challenge for a UFC title, building a storyline against Ronda Rousey’s “Four Horsewomen.”
- Ilara “Arya Stark” Joanne – Inspired by the Game of Thrones character Arya Stark, which she carried into her Bellator career.
- Leandro “Alter Ego” Higo – A play on Higo’s name, which is pronounced like “Ego.”
- Paulo “The Eraser” Costa – A nickname that became widely recognized during Costa’s UFC rise.
- Vanderlei “Soul Glo” Toquinho – A reference to the cult film Coming to America. Albarracin cornered Vanderlei in his most recent Jungle Fight appearance, where he became a four-time Jungle Fight champion, coaching alongside Lucas Wallace.
- The “Macho Man” from Kazakhstan – A nickname given to one of Albarracin’s Kazakhstani world champions.

Beyond nicknames, Albarracin has continued to coach and develop elite talent worldwide. He has assisted Kelvin Gastelum in training camps, supported Brazilian and international fighters in UFC and Bellator title fights, and currently coaches rising heavyweight José “Gugu” Augusto, who competes in Rizin.

=== Recognition ===
In 2019, Albarracin was named Coach of the Year by FanSided MMA after guiding his fighters to multiple world championships. That year Henry Cejudo won two UFC titles at flyweight and bantamweight, Patrício “Pitbull” Freire won two Bellator titles at featherweight and lightweight, and Patricky “Pitbull” Freire reached the Rizin finals. Paulo Costa defeated Yoel Romero to become the UFC’s number one middleweight contender, and Chan Sung Jung (“The Korean Zombie”) headlined in Korea with a victory over Frankie Edgar. Albarracin was also nominated for ESPN Coach of the Year in recognition of this unprecedented run.

Albarracin also presented Henry Cejudo with his plaque upon becoming the youngest inductee in history to the National Wrestling Hall of Fame.

=== Languages, commentary, and additional coaching ===
Albarracin’s “big three” languages are English, Portuguese, and Spanish, which he uses fluently in coaching and media. He also maintains working knowledge of Russian, Korean, and Chinese for corner communication. His language skills have made him a frequent translator in MMA, including for Team USA at an international event in Guatemala in 2005, for Paulo Costa on The MMA Hour with Ariel Helwani, and at UFC and Bellator press conferences and interviews for the Pitbull Brothers.

In addition to coaching, Albarracin has served as a commentator for both Karate Combat and Dominance MMA. In Karate Combat he worked alongside Luis V. Rocha, a two-division world champion regarded as one of the organization’s greatest fighters. He also coached Rocha during his career.

Albarracin was instrumental in recruiting and coaching Mark Madsen, an Olympic silver medalist and five-time world medalist in Greco-Roman wrestling. He coached Madsen to victory over UFC veteran Clay Guida and helped integrate him into one of the strongest wrestling-based MMA teams in the world, which also featured Olympic gold medalist Henry Cejudo. Madsen later launched his own promotion, Dominance MMA, where Albarracin contributed as both a coach and commentator.
