= Wrestling at the 2008 Summer Olympics – Men's freestyle 55 kg =

Men's freestyle 55 kg at the Games of the XXIX Olympiad
- Venue: China Agricultural University Gymnasium
- Date: 19 August 2008
- Competitors: 19 from 19 nations

Medalists
1st place, gold medalist(s)		Henry Cejudo	United States
2nd place, silver medalist(s)		Tomohiro Matsunaga	Japan
3rd place, bronze medalist(s)		Radoslav Velikov	Bulgaria
3rd place, bronze medalist(s)		Besik Kudukhov	Russia

Men's freestyle 55 kilograms competition at the 2008 Summer Olympics in Beijing, China, was held on August 19 at the China Agricultural University Gymnasium.

This freestyle wrestling competition consisted of a single-elimination tournament, with a repechage used to determine the winners of two bronze medals. The two finalists faced off for gold and silver medals. Each wrestler who lost to one of the two finalists moved into the repechage, culminating in a pair of bronze medal matches featuring the semifinal losers each facing the remaining repechage opponent from their half of the bracket.

Each bout consisted of up to three rounds, lasting two minutes apiece. The wrestler who scored more points in each round was the winner of that rounds; the bout finished when one wrestler had won two rounds (and thus the match).

Gold medal-winner Henry Cejudo would later leave the sport of wrestling to become a successful mixed martial artist in the UFC, simultaneously holding the world flyweight and bantamweight titles.

== Schedule ==
All times are China Standard Time (UTC+08:00)

Date	Time	Event
19 August 2008	09:30	Qualification rounds
19 August 2008	16:00	Repechage
19 August 2008	17:00	Finals

== Results ==
Legend

- F — Won by fall

=== Final ===
Final
Henry Cejudo (USA)	2	3
Tomohiro Matsunaga (JPN)	2	0

=== Top half ===
Qualifications

1/8 finals
Yang Kyong-il (PRK)	1	1	1
Namig Sevdimov (AZE)	1	3	2
Kim Hyo-sub (KOR)	3	3
Francisco Sánchez (ESP)	1	1
Henry Cejudo (USA)	0	3	4
Radoslav Velikov (BUL)	1	2	3
Petru Toarcă (ROU)	0	0
Besarion Gochashvili (GEO)	3	3

Quarterfinals
Namig Sevdimov (AZE)	1	1	2
Kim Hyo-sub (KOR)	2	0	0
Henry Cejudo (USA)	1	3	3
Besarion Gochashvili (GEO)	3	2	0

Semifinals
Namig Sevdimov (AZE)	5	2	3
Henry Cejudo (USA)	3	3	4

=== Bottom half ===
Qualifications
Adama Diatta (SEN)	0	0
Tomohiro Matsunaga (JPN)	1	4^{F}
Maikel Pérez (CUB)	0	0
Rizvan Gadzhiev (BLR)	7	6
Dilshod Mansurov (UZB)	1	1
Zhassulan Mukhtarbekuly (KAZ)	0	0

1/8 finals
Abbas Dabbaghi (IRI)	1	1	5
Fredy Serrano (COL)	0	1	1
Bayaraagiin Naranbaatar (MGL)	0	0
Besik Kudukhov (RUS)	1	1
Sezar Akgül (TUR)	0	0
Tomohiro Matsunaga (JPN)	5	3
Rizvan Gadzhiev (BLR)	1	0	0
Dilshod Mansurov (UZB)	0	1	1

Quarterfinals
Abbas Dabbaghi (IRI)	0	0
Besik Kudukhov (RUS)	6	1
Tomohiro Matsunaga (JPN)	2	0	2
Dilshod Mansurov (UZB)	1	1	1

Semifinals
Besik Kudukhov (RUS)	0	0
Tomohiro Matsunaga (JPN)	3	5^{F}

=== Repechage ===
Repechage round 1
Adama Diatta (SEN)	0	1	0
Sezar Akgül (TUR)	1	0	1

Repechage round 2
Radoslav Velikov (BUL)	1	2
Besarion Gochashvili (GEO)	0	1
Sezar Akgül (TUR)	0	0
Dilshod Mansurov (UZB)	4	4

Bronze medals
Radoslav Velikov (BUL)	0	3	1
Namig Sevdimov (AZE)	2	1	0
Dilshod Mansurov (UZB)	0	0
Besik Kudukhov (RUS)	1	2

== Final standing ==
Rank	Athlete
1st place, gold medalist(s)	Henry Cejudo (USA)
2nd place, silver medalist(s)	Tomohiro Matsunaga (JPN)
3rd place, bronze medalist(s)	Radoslav Velikov (BUL)
3rd place, bronze medalist(s)	Besik Kudukhov (RUS)
5	Namig Sevdimov (AZE)
5	Dilshod Mansurov (UZB)
7	Rizvan Gadzhiev (BLR)
8	Besarion Gochashvili (GEO)
9	Kim Hyo-sub (KOR)
10	Abbas Dabbaghi (IRI)
11	Sezar Akgül (TUR)
12	Yang Kyong-il (PRK)
13	Francisco Sánchez (ESP)
14	Fredy Serrano (COL)
15	Adama Diatta (SEN)
16	Bayaraagiin Naranbaatar (MGL)
16	Zhassulan Mukhtarbekuly (KAZ)
18	Petru Toarcă (ROU)
19	Maikel Pérez (CUB)
