= Giorgi Nikuradze =

Georgian footballer

Personal information
- Date of birth: 1 October 1979 (age 47)
- Place of birth: Tbilisi, Georgian SSR
- Height: 1.93 m (6 ft 4 in)
- Position: Goalkeeper

Senior career*
Years	Team	Apps	(Gls)
1995–1996	Kodako Tbilisi	5	(0)
1996–1998	TSU Tbilisi	5	(0)
1998	FC Dinamo-2 Tbilisi	9	(0)
1999	FC Guria Lanchkhuti	14	(0)
2000	FC Lokomotivi Tbilisi	1	(0)
2000	FC Gorda Rustavi	17	(0)
2001	FC Jokerit	0	(0)
2001	FC Jokrut	4	(0)
2002–2005	FC KooTeePee	34	(0)
2005–2006	FC Ameri Tbilisi	3	(0)
2007	TP-47	13	(0)

International career
2003	Georgia	1	(0)
- * Club domestic league appearances and goals

Giorgi Nikuradze (born 1 October 1979) is a Georgian former professional footballer.
