= Tomohiro Matsunaga =

Japanese wrestler (born 1980)

Personal information
- National team: Japan
- Born: June 27, 1980 (age 46) Shizuoka, Japan

Sport
- Sport: Wrestling
- Weight class: 55 Kilograms
Medal record
Men's freestyle wrestling
Representing Japan
Olympic Games
Silver medal – second place	2008 Beijing	55 kg
Asian Championships
Gold medal – first place	2008 Jeju City	55 kg

Tomohiro Matsunaga (松永 共広, Matsunaga Tomohiro; born June 27, 1980) is a Japanese freestyle wrestler. Matsunaga was born in Shizuoka. At the 2008 Summer Olympics in Beijing, he won silver in his category (55 kilograms).

Matsunaga has also competed in 2 SASUKE competitions (21–22), where he failed the Second Stage's Salmon Ladder and the First Stage's Jumping Spider respectively.
