= Abbas Dabbaghi =

Iranian wrestler (born 1987)

Personal information
- Born: 9 March 1987 (age 39) Sari, Iran
- Height: 173 cm (5 ft 8 in)

Sport
- Sport: Freestyle wrestling
- Club: Moezipoor
- Coached by: Esmail Dangesaraki
Medal record
Representing Iran
Asian Championships
| Bronze medal – third place | 2007 Bishkek | 55 kg |
| Gold medal – first place | 2006 Emirates | 50 kg |
| Gold medal – first place | 2004 Kyrgyzstan | 50 kg |
World Cup
| Silver medal – second place | 2009 Tehran | 55 kg |
| Silver medal – second place | 2006 Goatmala | 50 kg |
Takhti Cup
| Gold medal – first place | 2010 Isfahan | 55 kg |

Abbas Dabbaghi Souraki (Persian: عباس دباغی سورکی, born 9 March 1987) is an Iranian freestyle wrestler. Competing in the 55 kg division he won a bronze medal at the 2007 Asian Championships and a silver medal at the 2009 World Cup. He placed tenth at the 2008 Summer Olympics.

Dabbaghi also won a silver medal in Junior Worlds 2006 and gold medal Takhti Cup 2009.

== Major results ==
| Year | Competition | Venue | Position | Event | Notes |
Representing Iran
| 2004 | Asian New Junior Champion | Kyrgyzstan | 1st | Freestyle 50 kg | |
| 2006 | World Junior Champion Ship | Goatmala | 2nd | Freestyle 50 kg | |
| 2006 | Asian Junior Champion | Emirates | 1st | Freestyle 50 kg | |
| 2007 | Asian Champion Ship | Kyrgyzstan | 3rd | Freestyle 55 kg | |
| 2009 | Wrestling World Cup | Tehran | 2nd | Freestyle 55 kg | |
| 2010 | Takhti Cup | Isfahan | 1st | Freestyle 55 kg | |
